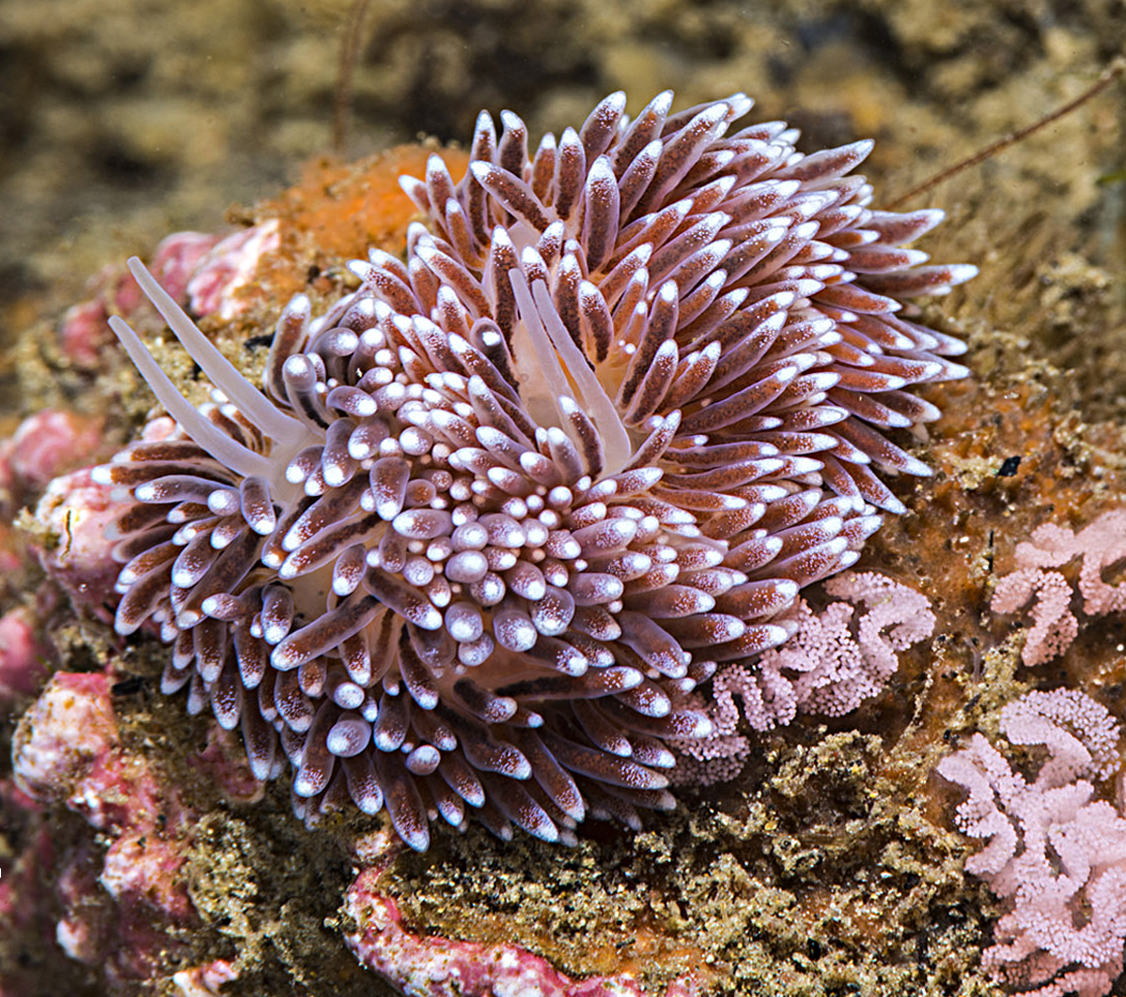
- Two Cuthona nana, likely mating

Scientific classification
- Kingdom: Animalia
- Phylum: Mollusca
- Class: Gastropoda
- Order: Nudibranchia
- Suborder: Aeolidacea
- Family: Cuthonidae
- Genus: Cuthona; Alder & Hancock, 1855

Synonyms
- Precuthona Odhner, 1929

= Cuthona =

Genus of gastropods

Cuthona is a genus of nudibranch in the family Cuthonidae.

== Ecology ==
Cuthona species feed on hydroids, and have uniseriate radulae with polydentate radular teeth.

== Taxonomic history ==
The type species of Cuthona is Cuthona nana, (Alder & Hancock, 1842). Some authorities consider the genera Catriona and Trinchesia to be synonymous with Cuthona. Most Cuthona species were transferred to other genera as a result of DNA phylogeny studies in 2016 and 2017.

Since then, Cuthona continues to be caught in the crossfire of a controversy that affects most heavily the family Trinchesiidae and any taxa that have been closely associated with it in the past, of which Cuthona is. Two teams of academics with radically different views on taxonomic method and integrity continue to publish papers near simultaneously with each other, that insist drastic taxonomic adjustments in opposite directions. The most recent publication belongs to Korshunova et al, 2025.

While The World Register of Marine Species (WoRMS) has cited Korshunova et al., 2025 across other taxonomic adjustments, in regards to Trinchesiidae and Cuthonidae there has yet to be adjustments.

== Species ==
According to Korshunova et al. (2025), species in the genus Cuthona include:

- Cuthona divae (Er. Marcus, 1961) - rose-pink cuthona
- Cuthona hermitophila (Martynov, Sanamyan & Korshunova, 2015)
- Cuthona nana (Alder & Hancock, 1842) - type species of Cuthona

Other known species of Cuthona that Korshunova et al. (2025) did not provide alternate placement for are as follows:

- Cuthona antarctica (Pfeffer, 1886) - Not to be confused with Galvinella antarctica Eliot, 1907
- Cuthona claviformis (Vicente, 1974)
- Cuthona crinita (Minichev, 1972)
- Cuthona destinyae (Hermosillo & Valdés, 2007)
- Cuthona fructuosa (Bergh, 1892)
- Cuthona georgiana (Pfeffer in Martens & Pfeffer, 1886)
- Cuthona germaini Risbec, 1937 - nomen dubium
- Cuthona mimetica Pruvot-Fol, 1930 - nomen dubium
- Cuthona giarannae (Valdés, Moran & Woods, 2012)
- Cuthona lizae Angulo-Campillo & Valdés, 2003
- Cuthona methana (Valdés, Lundsten & N. G. Wilson, 2018)
- Cuthona norvegica (Odhner, 1929)
- Cuthona paucicirra Minichev, 1972
- Cuthona phoenix Gosliner, 1981
- Cuthona rolleri Gosliner & Behrens, 1988

Species brought into synonymy:

- Cuthona abronia (MacFarland, 1966): synonym of Abronica abronia
- Cuthona abyssicola (Bergh, 1884): synonym of Cuthonella abyssicola
- Cuthona acinosa (Risbec, 1928): synonym of Trinchesia acinosa - Uncertain taxon
- Cuthona akibai (Baba, 1984): synonym of Trinchesia akibai
- Cuthona albocrusta (MacFarland, 1966): synonym of Trinchesia albocrusta
- Cuthona albopunctata (Schmekel, 1968): synonym of Trinchesia albopunctata
- Cuthona alpha (Baba & Hamatani, 1963): synonym of Catriona alpha
- Cuthona amoena (Alder & Hancock, 1845): synonym of Rubramoena amoena
- Cuthona anulata (Baba, 1949): synonym of Trinchesia anulata
- Cuthona aurantia (Alder & Hancock, 1842):synonym of Catriona aurantia
- Cuthona berghi (Friele, 1902): synonym of Cuthonella abyssicola
- Cuthona barbadiana (Edmunds & Just, 1983): synonym of Trinchesia barbadiana
- Cuthona behrensi (Hermosillo & Á. Valdés, 2007): synonym of Hanatazuia behrensi
- Cuthona beta (Baba & Abe, 1964): synonym of Trinchesia beta
- Cuthona bractea (Burn, 1962): synonym of Tularia bractea
- Cuthona caerulea (Montagu, 1804): synonym of Trinchesia caerulea
- Cuthona cocoachroma Williams & Gosliner, 1979: synonym of Margina cocoachroma
- Cuthona columbiana (O'Donoghue, 1922): synonym of Catriona columbiana
- Cuthona concinna (Alder & Hancock, 1843): synonym of Fiocuthona concinna
- Cuthona correai (Ortea, Caballer & Moro, 2002): synonym of Trinchesia correai
- Cuthona diminutiva (Gosliner, 1980): synonym of Trinchesia diminutiva
- Cuthona distans Odhner, 1922: synonym of Fiocuthona concinna (Alder & Hancock, 1843)
- Cuthona diversicolor Baba, 1975: synonym of Trinchesia diversicolor
- Cuthona elenae (Martynov, 2000): synonym of Penistella elenae
- Cuthona elioti Odhner, 1944: synonym of Galvinella antarctica Eliot, 1907
- Cuthona emurai (Baba, 1937): synonym of Hermissenda emurai
- Cuthona ferruginea (Friele, 1902): synonym of Cuthonella abyssicola (Bergh 1884)
- Cuthona fidenciae (Ortea, Moro & Espinosa, 1999):synonym of Trinchesia fidenciae
- Cuthona flavovulta (MacFarland, 1966): synonym of Diaphoreolis flavovulta
- Cuthona foliata (Forbes & Goodsir, 1839): synonym of Trinchesia foliata
- Cuthona fulgens (MacFarland, 1966): synonym of Zelentia fulgens
- Cuthona futairo (Baba, 1963): synonym of Trinchesia futairo
- Cuthona genovae (O'Donoghue, 1929): synonym of Trinchesia genovae
- Cuthona granosa (Schmekel, 1966): synonym of Trinchesia granosa
- Cuthona gymnota (Couthouy, 1838): synonym of Catriona gymnota
- Cuthona hamanni (Behrens, 1987): synonym of Trinchesia hamanni
- Cuthona henrici Eliot, 1916: synonym of Trinchesia henrici
- Cuthona herrerai Ortea, Moro & Caballer, 2002: synonym of Trinchesia herrerai
- Cuthona hiemalis Roginskaya, 1987: synonym of Nella hiemalis
- Cuthona ilonae (Schmekel, 1968): synonym of Trinchesia ilonae
- Cuthona iris Edmunds & Just, 1983: synonym of Trinchesia iris
- Cuthona japonica Baba, 1937: synonym of Sakuraeolis japonica (Baba, 1937)
- Cuthona kanga (Edmunds, 1970): synonym of Trinchesia kanga
- Cuthona kuiteri Rudman, 1981: synonym of Trinchesia kuiterorum
- Cuthona lagunae (O'Donoghue, 1926): synonym of Diaphoreolis lagunae
- Cuthona leopardina (Vayssière, 1888): synonym of Trinchesia leopardina
- Cuthona longi Behrens, 1985: synonym of Trinchesia longi
- Cuthona macquariensis (Burn, 1973): synonym of Trinchesia macquariensis
- Cuthona marisalbi Roginskaya, 1963: synonym of Fiocuthona concinna
- Cuthona millenae Hermosillo & Valdés, 2007: synonym of Trinchesia millenae
- Cuthona mimar (Ortea & Moro, 2018): synonym of Trinchesia mimar
- Cuthona miniostriata (Schmekel, 1968): synonym of Trinchesia miniostriata
- Cuthona modesta (Eliot, 1907): synonym of Cuthonella modesta
- Cuthona netsica (Er. Marcus & Ev. Marcus, 1960): synonym of Njurja netsica
- Cuthona ocellata (Schmekel, 1966): synonym of Trinchesia ocellata
- Cuthona odhneri Er. Marcus, 1959: synonym of Trinchesia odhneri
- Cuthona ornata Baba, 1937: synonym of Trinchesia ornata
- Cuthona osyoro (Baba, 1940): synonym of Nella osyoro
- Cuthona pallida (Eliot, 1906): synonym of Trinchesia pallida - Not to be confused with Tenellia pallida (Alder & Hancock, 1845)
- Cuthona perca (Er. Marcus, 1958): synonym of Trinchesia perca
- Cuthona peregrina (Gmelin, 1791): synonym of Cratena peregrina
- Cuthona pinnifera (Baba, 1949): synonym of Trinchesia pinnifera
- Cuthona poritophages Rudman, 1979: synonym of Phestilla poritophages
- Cuthona puellula (Baba, 1955)synonym of Trinchesia puellula
- Cuthona pumilio (Bergh, 1871)synonym of Trinchesia pumilio
- Cuthona punicea Millen, 1986: synonym of Cuthonella punicea
- Cuthona purpureoanulata (Baba, 1961): synonym of Abronica purpureoanulata
- Cuthona pusilla (Bergh, 1898)synonym of Trinchesia pusilla
- Cuthona pustulata (Alder & Hancock, 1854): synonym of Zelentia pustulata
- Cuthona reflexa (M. C. Miller, 1977): synonym of Trinchesia reflexa
- Cuthona riosi Hermosillo & Valdés, 2008synonym of Trinchesia riosi
- Cuthona rubescens Picton & Brown, 1978: synonym of Rubramoena rubescens
- Cuthona rubra (Edmunds, 1964): synonym of Selva rubra
- Cuthona schraderi Pfeffer, 1886: synonym of Guyvalvoria paradoxa Eliot, 1907
- Cuthona scintillans (Miller, 1977): synonym of Diaphoreolis scintillans
- Cuthona sibogae (Bergh, 1905): synonym of Trinchesia sibogae (Bergh, 1905) - Not to be confused with Phestilla sibogae (Bergh, 1905)
- Cuthona speciosa (Macnae, 1954): synonym of Trinchesia speciosa
- Cuthona stimpsoni A. E. Verrill, 1879: synonym of Ziminella salmonacea (Couthouy, 1838)
- Cuthona suecica (Odhner, 1940): synonym of Xenocratena suecica
- Cuthona thelmae (Burn, 1964): synonym of Toorna thelmae
- Cuthona thompsoni Garcia, Lopez-Gonzalez & Garcia-Gomez, 1991: synonym of Trinchesia thompsoni
- Cuthona tina (Er. Marcus, 1957): synonym of Trinchesia tina
- Cuthona valentini (Eliot, 1907): synonym of Trinchesia valentini
- Cuthona veronicae (A. E. Verrill, 1880): synonym of Diaphoreolis veronicae
- Cuthona virens (MacFarland, 1966): synonym of Trinchesia virens
- Cuthona viridis (Forbes, 1840): synonym of Diaphoreolis viridis
- Cuthona willani Cervera, Garcia-Gomez & Lopez-Gonzalez, 1992:synonym of Trinchesia willani
- Cuthona yamasui Hamatani, 1993: synonym of Trinchesia yamasui
- Cuthona zelandica Odhner, 1924: synonym of Trinchesia zelandica
