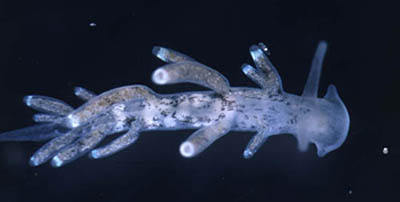
- A live individual of Tenellia adspersa, head end towards the right

Scientific classification
- Kingdom: Animalia
- Phylum: Mollusca
- Class: Gastropoda
- Order: Nudibranchia
- Suborder: Aeolidacea
- Family: Trinchesiidae
- Genus: Tenellia; Costa, 1866

= Tenellia =

Genus of gastropods

Tenellia is a genus of sea slugs, aeolid nudibranchs, marine gastropod molluscs in the family Trinchesiidae.

== Taxonomic history ==
This was a small genus until a DNA phylogeny of the former family Tergipedidae resulted in most species of Cuthona being transferred to this genus. Miller (2004) restricted the genus Cuthona (Alder & Hancock, 1855) to the type species, C. nana (Alder & Hancock, 1842), and transferred to the genus Trinchesia the rest of the species previously included in Cuthona. Miller has been followed by some authors, and has not been followed by others - and there is currently much instability on the extension and contents of these two genera. Cella et al., 2016 hypothesised that the genus Tenellia should include many former Cuthona and Trinchesia species, with others being placed in new genera. Since then, there has been much shuffling of species between genera, many species being returned from Trinchesia to Tenellia, and others being placed in several smaller genera, Catriona, Diaphoreolis, Phestilla, and Zelentia.

In the most recent study, Korshunova et al., 2025 re-examined genetic, physical, evolutionary, and environmental characteristics of species within the suborder Aeolidacea, and proposed a massive recategorization of taxons. It was stated that the previous "lumping" of taxa together obscures the diversity and evolutionary origins of species. The extensive study proposed reversing several previous mass species reassignments between genera, reinstating taxa that had fallen to synonymy in previous papers, restricting genera, and suggesting guidelines for how to categorize species that likely belong to yet-undiscovered genera.

While The World Register of Marine Species (WoRMS) has cited Korshunova et al., 2025 across other taxonomic adjustments, in regards to Trinchesiidae, who is possibly the most controversed Aeolidean family with papers being published nearly every year from opposing camps, there has yet to be adjustments.

== Species ==
According to Korshunova et al. (2025), species within the genus Tenellia include:

- Tenellia adspersa (Nordmann, 1845) - type species
- Tenellia gotlandica (Lundin, Malmberg, Martynov & Korshunova, 2022)
- Tenellia pallida (Alder & Hancock, 1845) - (Considered a synonym of Tenellia adspersa (von Nordmann, 1845) by some sources)
- Tenellia fuscata (Gould, 1870) - noted as a "possible synonym of Tenellia pallida"

Species now moved to other genera include:

- Tenellia acinosa (Risbec, 1928): synonym of Trinchesia acinosa
- Tenellia albocrusta (MacFarland, 1966): synonym of Trinchesia albocrusta
- Tenellia albopunctata (Schmekel, 1968): synonym of Trinchesia albopunctata
- Tenellia amoris (Korshunova & Martynov, 2022): synonym of Zelentia amoris
- Tenellia anulata (Baba, 1949): synonym of Trinchesia anulata
- Tenellia aurantia (Alder & Hancock, 1842): synonym of Catriona aurantia
- Tenellia beta (Baba & Abe, 1964): synonym of Trinchesia beta
- Tenellia boma (Edmunds, 1970): synonym of Trinchesia boma
- Tenellia bughaw A. Y. Kim & Gosliner, 2024: synonym of Trinchesia bughaw
- Tenellia caerulea (Montagu, 1804): synonym of Trinchesia caerulea
- Tenellia casha (Gosliner & R. J. Griffiths, 1981): synonym of Catriona casha
- Tenellia catachroma (Burn, 1963): synonym of Trinchesia catachroma
- Tenellia colmani (Burn, 1961): synonym of Narraeolida colmani
- Tenellia columbiana (O'Donoghue, 1922): synonym of Catriona columbiana
- Tenellia cuanensis (Korshunova, Picton, Furfaro, Mariottini, Pontes, Prkić, Fletcher, Malmberg, Lundin & Martynov, 2019): synonym of Trinchesia cuanensis
- Tenellia diljuvia (Korshunova, Picton, Furfaro, Mariottini, Pontes, Prkić, Fletcher, Malmberg, Lundin & Martynov, 2019): synonym of Trinchesia dilujuvia
- Tenellia divanica (Martynov, 2002): synonym of Trinchesia divanica
- Tenellia diversicolor (Baba, 1975): synonym of Trinchesia diversicolor
- Tenellia flavovulta (MacFarland, 1966): synonym of Diaphoreolis flavovulta
- Tenellia foliata (Forbes & Goodsir, 1839): synonym of Trinchesia foliata
- Tenellia fulgens (MacFarland, 1966): synonym of Zelentia fulgens
- Tenellia genovae (O'Donoghue, 1929): synonym of Trinchesia genovae
- Tenellia granosa (Schmekel, 1966): synonym of Trinchesia granosa
- Tenellia gymnota (Couthouy, 1838): synonym of Catriona gymnota
- Tenellia hiranorum (Martynov, Sanamyan & Korshunova, 2015): synonym of Trinchesia hiranorum
- Tenellia ilonae (Schmekel, 1968): synonym of Trinchesia ilonae
- Tenellia ivetteae (Gosliner & Bertsch, 2017): synonym of Trinchesia ivetteae
- Tenellia kanga (Edmunds, 1970): synonym of Trinchesia kanga
- Tenellia kishiwadensis (Martynov, Korshunova, Lundin & Malmberg, 2022): synonym of Catriona kishiwadensis
- Tenellia kuiterorum (Rudman, 1981): synonym of Trinchesia kuiterorum
- Tenellia lagunae (O'Donoghue, 1926): synonym of Diaphoreolis lagunae
- Tenellia lenkae (Martynov, 2002): synonym of Trinchesia lenkae
- Tenellia lucerna (Korshunova, Martynov, Lundin & Malmberg, 2022): synonym of Catriona lucerna
- Tenellia macquariensis (Burn, 1973): synonym of Trinchesia macquariensis
- Tenellia maua (Er. Marcus & Ev. Marcus, 1960): synonym of Catriona maua
- Tenellia midori (Martynov, Sanamyan & Korshunova, 2015): synonym of Diaphoreolis midori
- Tenellia millenae (Hermosillo & Valdés, 2007): synonym of Trinchesia millenae
- Tenellia miniostriata (Schmekel, 1968): synonym of Trinchesia miniostriata
- Tenellia momella (Edmunds, 1970): synonym of Trinchesia momella
- Tenellia morrowae (Korshunova, Picton, Furfaro, Mariottini, Pontes, Prkić, Fletcher, Malmberg, Lundin & Martynov, 2019): synonym of Trinchesia morrowae
- Tenellia nakapila (A. Y. Kim & Gosliner, 2024): synonym of Trinchesia nakapila
- Tenellia nepunicea (Korshunova, Fletcher, Lundin, Picton & Martynov, 2018): synonym of Zelentia nepunicea
- Tenellia ninel (Korshunova, Martynov & Picton, 2017): synonym of Zelentia ninel
- Tenellia ocellata (Schmekel, 1966): synonym of Trinchesia ocellata
- Tenellia ornata (Baba, 1937): synonym of Trinchesia ornata
- Tenellia osezakiensis (Martynov, Korshunova, Lundin & Malmberg, 2022): synonym of Catriona osezakiensis
- Tenellia punicea (Millen, 1986): synonym of Cuthonella punicea
- Tenellia pupillae (Baba, 1961): synonym of Trinchesia pupillae
- Tenellia pustulata (Alder & Hancock, 1854): synonym of Zelentia pustulata
- Tenellia puti (A. Y. Kim & Gosliner, 2024): synonym of Trinchesia puti
- Tenellia reflexa (Miller, 1977): synonym of Trinchesia reflexa
- Tenellia roginskae (Korshunova, Fletcher, Lundin, Picton & Martynov, 2018): synonym of Zelentia roginskae
- Tenellia rubrata (Edmunds, 1970): synonym of Trinchesia rubrata
- Tenellia scintillans (Miller, 1977): synonym of Diaphoreolis scintillans
- Tenellia sororum (Burn, 1964): synonym of Trinchesia sororum
- Tenellia spadix (MacFarland, 1966): synonym of Catriona spadix
- Tenellia speciosa (Macnae, 1954): synonym of Trinchesia speciosa
- Tenellia stipata (Alder & Hancock, 1843): synonym of Diaphoreolis stipata
- Tenellia taita (Edmunds, 1970): synonym of Trinchesia taita
- Tenellia thelmae (Burn, 1964): synonym of Toorna thelmae
- Tenellia virens (MacFarland, 1966): synonym of Trinchesia virens
- Tenellia viridiana (Burn, 1962): synonym of Trinchesia viridiana
- Tenellia viridis (Forbes, 1840): synonym of Diaphoreolis viridis
- Tenellia yamasui (Hamatani, 1993): synonym of Trinchesia yamasui
- Tenellia willowsi (Korshunova, Fletcher, Lundin, Picton & Martynov, 2018): synonym of Zelentia willowsi
- Tenellia zelandica (Odhner, 1924): synonym of Trinchesia zelandica
- Tenellia zvezda (Korshunova, Fletcher, Bakken & Martynov, 2023): synonym of Diaphoreolis zvezda

Controversed species currently represented by an alternate genus include:

- Tenellia arnoldi (Mehrotra & Caballer, 2024) represented as Phestilla arnoldi (Mehrotra & Caballer, 2024)
- Tenellia chaetopterana (Ekimova, Deart & Schepetov, 2017) represented as Phestilla chaetopterana
- Tenellia fuscostriata (J. T. Hu, Y. J. Zhang, J. Y. Xie & J.-W. Qiu, 2020) represented as Phestilla fuscostriata
- Tenellia goniophaga (J.-T. Hu, Y.-J. Zhang, S. K. F. Yiu, J. Y. Xie & J.-W. Qui, 2020) represented as Phestilla goniophaga
- Tenellia lugubris (Bergh, 1870) represented as Phestilla lugubris
- Tenellia melanobrachia (Bergh, 1874) represented as Phestilla melanobrachia
- Tenellia minor (Rudman, 1981) represented as Phestilla minor
- Tenellia panamica (Rudman, 1982) represented as Phestilla panamica
- Tenellia poritophages (Rudman, 1979) represented as Phestilla poritophages
- Tenellia subodiosa (A. Wang, Conti-Jerpe, J. L. Richards & D. M. Baker, 2020) represented as Phestilla subodiosa
- Tenellia viei (Mehrotra, Caballer & Chavanich, 2020) represented as Phestilla viei
