= Trinchesia behrensi =

Scientific classification
- Kingdom: Animalia
- Phylum: Mollusca
- Class: Gastropoda
- Order: Nudibranchia
- Suborder: Aeolidacea
- Family: Trinchesiidae
- Genus: Trinchesia
- Species: T. behrensi

Binomial name
- Trinchesia behrensi (Hermosillo & Valdés, 2007)

Synonyms
- Cuthona behrensi Hermosillo & Valdés, 2007

Species of gastropod

Trinchesia behrensi is a species of sea slug, an aeolid nudibranch, a marine gastropod mollusc in the family Trinchesiidae.

== Distribution ==
This species was described from a single specimen found at 10 m depth at the Azuero Peninsula, Pacific Ocean coast of Panama.
