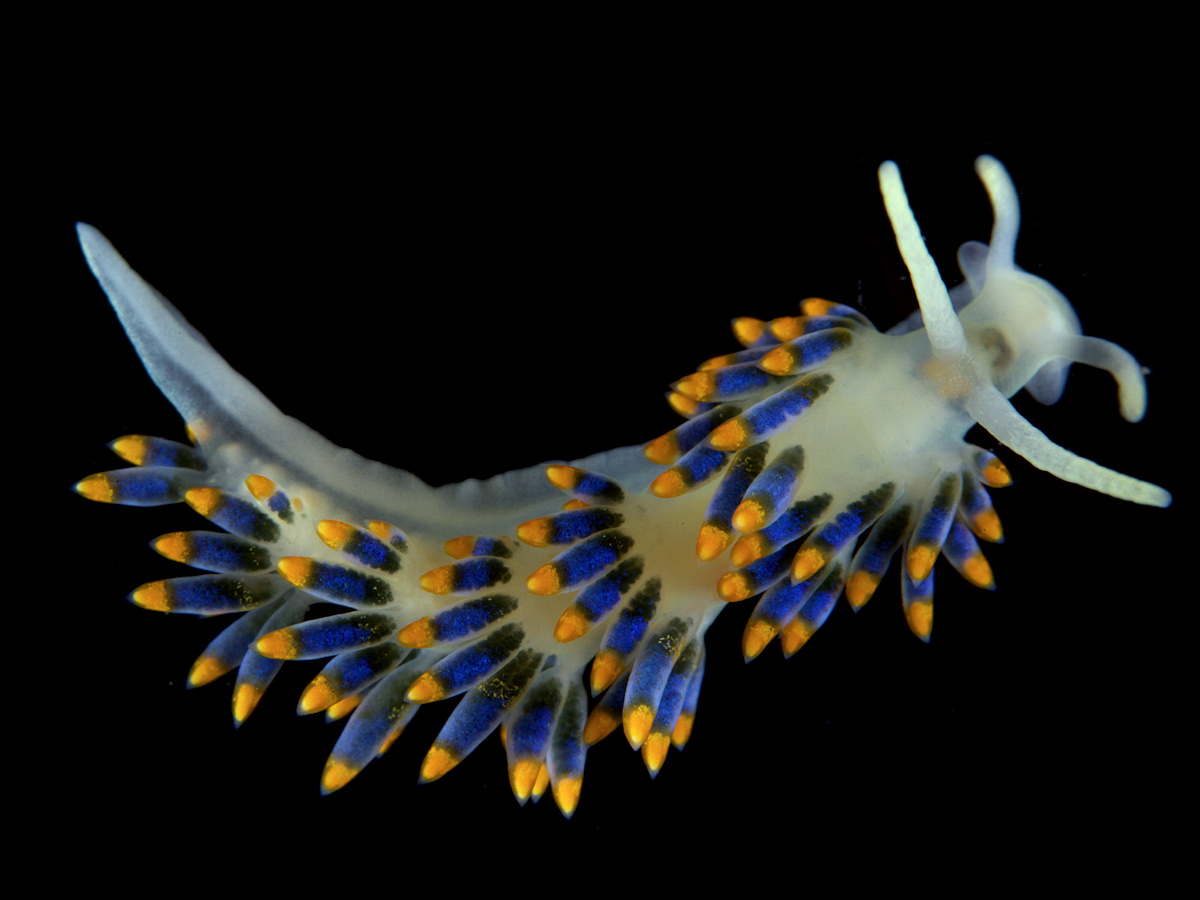
- Trinchesia caerulea, the type species of Trinchesia

Scientific classification
- Kingdom: Animalia
- Phylum: Mollusca
- Class: Gastropoda
- Order: Nudibranchia
- Suborder: Aeolidacea
- Family: Trinchesiidae
- Genus: Trinchesia; H. von Ihering, 1879

Type species
- Trinchesia caerulea (Montagu, 1804)

Synonyms
- Narraeolida Burn, 1961; Toorna Burn, 1964

= Trinchesia =

Genus of gastropods

Trinchesia is a genus of sea slugs, aeolid nudibranchs, marine gastropod molluscs in the family Trinchesiidae. All species were transferred to Tenellia as a result of a DNA phylogeny study in 2016. The genus was dismembered and broken into several smaller genera in 2017 with further DNA evidence and a re-interpretation of genus and family characteristics.

In yet another study, Korshunova et al., 2025 conducted a mass reassessment of Aeolidacea taxa and proposed to reverse previous motions that "lumped" taxa together indiscriminately. While The World Register of Marine Species (WoRMS) has cited Korshunova et al., 2025 across other taxonomic adjustments, in regards to Trinchesiidae, who is possibly the most controversed Aeolidean family with papers being published nearly every year from opposing camps, there has yet to be adjustments.

Trinchesia species feed on hydroids.

== Species ==
According to Korshunova et al. (2025), it is noted that many species listed herein do not align with Trinchesia diagnostics, and belong truly to genera that have yet to be established.

Species currently included Trinchesia sensu strictissimo according to Korshunova et al. (2025):

- Trinchesia caerulea (Montagu, 1804) - type species of Trinchesia
- Trinchesia cuanensis (Korshunova, Picton, Furfaro, Mariottini, Pontes, Prkić, Fletcher, Malmberg, Lundin & Martynov, 2019)
- Trinchesia diljuvia (Korshunova, Picton, Furfaro, Mariottini, Pontes, Prkić, Fletcher, Malmberg, Lundin & Martynov, 2019)
- Trinchesia morrowae (Korshunova, Picton, Furfaro, Mariottini, Pontes, Prkić, Fletcher, Malmberg, Lundin & Martynov, 2019)

Species currently included in Trinchesia sensu latissimo according to Korshunova et al. (2025):

- Trinchesia acinosa (Risbec, 1928)
- Trinchesia adyarensis (Rao, 1928)
- Trinchesia akibai (Baba, 1984)
- Trinchesia albocrusta (MacFarland, 1966) - white-crusted aeolid
- Trinchesia albopunctata Schmekel, 1968
- Trinchesia anandalei (Eliot, 1910)
- Trinchesia anulata (Baba, 1949)
- Trinchesia barbadiana (Edmunds & Just, 1983)
- Trinchesia beta (Baba & Abe, 1964)
- Trinchesia boma (Edmunds, 1970)
- Trinchesia bughaw (Kim & Gosliner, 2024)
- Trinchesia catachroma (Burn, 1963)
- Trinchesia correai (Ortea, Caballer, and Moro, 2002)
- Trinchesia diminutiva (Gosliner, 1980)
- Trinchesia divanica Martynov, 2002
- Trinchesia diversicolor (Baba, 1975)
- Trinchesia fidenciae (Ortea et al., 1999)
- Trinchesia foliata (Forbes & Goodsir, 1839)
- Trinchesia futairo Baba, 1963
- Trinchesia genovae O'Donoghue, 1926
- Trinchesia granosa Schmekel, 1966
- Trinchesia hamanni Behrens, 1987
- Trinchesia henrici Eliot, 1916
- Trinchesia herrerai Ortea et al., 2002
- Trinchesia hiranorum (Martynov, Sanamyan & Korshunova, 2015)
- Trinchesia ilonae (Schmekel, 1968)
- Trinchesia iris Edmunds & Just, 1983
- Trinchesia ivetteae (Gosliner & Bertsch, 2017)
- Trinchesia kanga (Edmunds, 1970)
- Trinchesia kuiterorum (Rudman, 1981)
- Trinchesia lenkae Martynov, 2002
- Trinchesia leopardina (Vassiere, 1888
- Trinchesia longi Behrens, 1985
- Trinchesia macquariensis Burn, 1973
- Trinchesia millenae Hermosillo & Valdes, 2007
- Trinchesia mimar Ortea and Moro, 2018
- Trinchesia miniostriata Schmekel, 1968
- Trinchesia momella (Edmunds, 1970)
- Trinchesia nakapila Kim & Gosliner, 2024
- Trinchesia nigricolora Baba,1955
- Trinchesia ocellata Schmekel, 1966
- Trinchesia odhneri Er. Marcus, 1958
- Trinchesia ornata (Baba, 1937)
- Trinchesia pallida (Eliot, 1906) - Not to be confused with Tenellia pallida (Alder & Hancock, 1845), synonym of Tenellia adspersa(von Nordmann, 1845)
- Trinchesia pinnifera Baba, 1949
- Trinchesia puellula Baba, 1955
- Trinchesia pupillae (Baba, 1961)
- Trinchesia pumilio Bergh, 1871
- Trinchesia pusilla Bergh, 1898
- Trinchesia puti Kim & Gosliner, 2024
- Trinchesia reflexa (Miller, 1977)
- Trinchesia riosi Hermosillo & Valdes, 2008
- Trinchesia rubrata (Edmunds, 1970)
- Trinchesia sibogae Bergh, 1905 - This taxon has been confused with Phestilla sibogae Bergh, 1905 in the past. The two are unique taxa and should never be treated as synonyms.
- Trinchesia signifera Baba, 1961
- Trinchesia sororum Burn, 1964
- Trinchesia speciosa (Macnae, 1954) - candy nudibranch
- Trinchesia taita Edmunds, 1970
- Trinchesia thompsoni Garcia et al., 1991
- Trinchesia tina Er. Marcus, 1957
- Trinchesia valentini Eliot, 1907
- Trinchesia vermifera Verrill, 1871
- Trinchesia virens (MacFarland, 1966)
- Trinchesia viridiana (Burn, 1962)
- Trinchesia willani (Cervera et al., 1992)
- Trinchesia yamasui (Hamatani, 1993)
- Trinchesia zelandica (Odhner, 1924)

Species formerly in the genus Trinchesia:

- Trinchesia alpha (Baba & Hamatani, 1963): synonym of Catriona alpha
- Trinchesia colmani (Burn, 1961): synonym of Narraeolida colmani
- Trinchesia midori Martynov, Sanamyan & Korshunova, 2015: synonym of Diaphoreolis midori
- Trinchesia pustulata (Alder & Hancock, 1854): synonym of Zelentia pustulata
- Trinchesia scintillans (M. C. Miller, 1977): synonym of Diaphoreolis scintillans
- Trinchesia thelmae (Burn, 1964): synonym of Toorna thelmae
- Trinchesia viridis (Forbes, 1840) synonym of Diaphoreolis viridis
