= Trinchesia signifera =

Scientific classification
- Kingdom: Animalia
- Phylum: Mollusca
- Class: Gastropoda
- Order: Nudibranchia
- Suborder: Aeolidacea
- Family: Trinchesiidae
- Genus: Trinchesia
- Species: T. signifera

Binomial name
- Trinchesia signifera (Baba, 1961)

Synonyms
- Catriona signifiera Baba, 1961

Species of gastropod

Trinchesia signifera is a species of sea slug, an aeolid nudibranch, a marine gastropod mollusc in the family Trinchesiidae.

== Distribution ==
This species was described from Tannowa, Osaka Bay, on the shore (March 1951 and 1959, 12 specimens, collected by Mr. Hamatani) and Mukaishima, Seto Inland Sea, on Sargassum weed in shallow water (March 1960, 27 specimens, collected by Dr. Inaba).

== Description ==
This species has sometimes been considered to be a synonym of Diaphoreolis viridis, but unlike that species, it has oval spots of white pigment on the cerata and white rhinophores and oral tentacles. There is an ovoid brown or black mark on the back, behind the rhinophores.
