= Trinchesia pupillae =

Scientific classification
- Kingdom: Animalia
- Phylum: Mollusca
- Class: Gastropoda
- Order: Nudibranchia
- Suborder: Aeolidacea
- Family: Trinchesiidae
- Genus: Trinchesia
- Species: T. pupillae

Binomial name
- Trinchesia pupillae (Baba), 1961

Synonyms
- Catriona pupillae Baba, 1961; Cuthona pupillae (Baba, 1961); Tenellia pupillae (Baba, 1961)

Species of gastropod

Trinchesia pupillae is a species of sea slug, an aeolid nudibranch, a marine gastropod mollusc in the family Trinchesiidae.

== Distribution ==
This species was described from shallow water at Tannowa and Kada, Osaka Bay, Pacific Ocean coast, Japan. The original description also lists additional localities of Mukaishima, Inland Sea of Seto; Nou and Awashima, Niigata Prefecture; Toyama Bay and Tsuruga Bay, Sea of Japan coast. The species is also reported from Oyster Bay, Dar es Salaam, Tanzania.

== Description ==
The adult size of Trinchesia pupillae is only 3–5 mm. It has swollen cerata and extensive white surface pigmentation on the body and cerata, with an orange ring on the rhinophores and oral tentacles.
