= Trinchesia herrerai =

Scientific classification
- Kingdom: Animalia
- Phylum: Mollusca
- Class: Gastropoda
- Order: Nudibranchia
- Suborder: Aeolidacea
- Family: Trinchesiidae
- Genus: Trinchesia
- Species: T. herrerai

Binomial name
- Trinchesia herrerai (Ortea, Moro & Caballer, 2002)

Synonyms
- Cuthona herrerai Ortea, Moro & Caballer, 2002; Cuthona luciae Á. Valdés, Medrano & Bhave, 2016

Species of gastropod

Trinchesia herrerai is a species of sea slug, an aeolid nudibranch, a marine gastropod mollusc in the family Trinchesiidae.

== Taxonomic history ==
The species was first described, then named as Cuthona herrerai in 2002. It was a Cuthona species until a DNA phylogeny of the former family Tergipedidae resulted in most species of Cuthona being transferred to the genus.

== Distribution ==
This species was described from Tarrafal de Monte Trigo, Santo Antão, Cape Verde Islands.
