= Trinchesia futairo =

Scientific classification
- Kingdom: Animalia
- Phylum: Mollusca
- Class: Gastropoda
- Order: Nudibranchia
- Suborder: Aeolidacea
- Family: Trinchesiidae
- Genus: Trinchesia
- Species: T. futairo

Binomial name
- Trinchesia futairo (Baba, 1963)

Synonyms
- Cuthona bicolor Baba, 1933 non Bergh, 1904; Cuthona futairo Baba, 1963

Species of gastropod

Trinchesia futairo is a species of sea slug, an aeolid nudibranch, a marine gastropod mollusc in the family Trinchesiidae.

== Distribution ==
This species was described from Mukaishima, Inland Sea of Seto, Japan. Also reported from Mutsu Bay, Sagami Bay; Sugashima near Toba, Osaka Bay, Saeki Bay, Amakusa and Toyama Bay in the original description.

== Description ==
The typical adult size of this species is 10 mm. The body is pale orange-yellow with the tips of the oral tentacles and rhinophores deeper orange-yellow. The oral tentacles have a longitudinal opaque white band on the posterior side. The cerata have an opaque white mark below the tip on the outer surface.
