= Phestilla sibogae =

Scientific classification
- Kingdom: Animalia
- Phylum: Mollusca
- Class: Gastropoda
- Order: Nudibranchia
- Suborder: Aeolidacea
- Family: Trinchesiidae
- Genus: Phestilla
- Species: P. sibogae

Binomial name
- Phestilla sibogae Bergh, 1905

Synonyms
- Aeolidia edmondsoni Ostergaard, 1955; Aeolidiella edmondsoni (Ostergaard, 1955)

Species of gastropod

Phestilla sibogae is a species of sea slug, an aeolid nudibranch, a marine gastropod mollusk in the family Trinchesiidae. The species feeds on the hard coral genus Porites.

== Taxon confusion ==
Phestilla sibogae Bergh, 1905 is a taxon fully unique from Trinchesia sibogae (Bergh, 1905). Both animals were first described in the very same publication on adjacent pages, T. sibogae then called Hervia sibogae, and P. sibogae as it is now. There has been much confusion and mishandling of these taxa over the years, with erroneous synonymy and false representation occurring frequently.

As Trinchesiidae is a family rife with classification controversy, both the genera Phestilla and Trinchesia have at some point in their histories been merged into Tenellia, which is likely when the worst of the confusion began.

There are recent studies that acknowledge the validity of the two taxa as unique organisms, even explicitly stating the difference in radular structure; its sure assignment to the genus Phestilla can be owed to its tooth shape, "strongly elongated needle-shape denticles" characteristic to Phestilla.

== Description ==
Phestilla sibogae is an aeolid nudibranch, described originally from preserved specimens. Per Bergh's original description in 1905, the colour of the body and rhinophores is described a light milky white, and the cerata dirty brownish-grey with a white tip. The dorsum in rounded into the lateral body. Down the middle of the back, from head to tail, is bare, the cerata attached at the sides. The long, conical cerata were noted as strongly knobbly only due to the solution the animals were preserved in, though the later false synonymy of P. sibogae with Phestilla lugubris suggest the two species bear a strong resemblance and thus the living creatures do also have knobbly cerata.

The original description of Aeolidia edmondsoni, who was later synonymized with P. sibogae, provides a better understanding with a longer, more thorough description and the addition of two illustrations. The body is "truncate anteriorly", and tapers to a point at the tail. The rhinophores are smooth, narrow at the tip and thicken towards the base, where they join at the body. The oral tentacles are a little shorter and more pointed than the rhinopores. The eye spots, "minute and close together", are right behind the base of the rhinophores. A third of its body length behind the head is a distinct "cardiac swelling", a rounded bump indicating the internal placement of the heart and associated organs, a trait common in phestillids and can be also be observed in certain other aeolid nudibranchs such as Spurilla.

The cerata are "numerous and arranged in crowded obliquely transverse rows, which fall away gracefully" from the center of the dorsum at either side of the body, leaving a tract of bare dorsum that narrows towards the tail. The number of ceratal rows gradually decrease approaching the tail tip, where only a few small cerata are. The cerata themselves are flattened but are weakly knobbly, having "many elevations and other irregularities", and "terminate distally in a nipple tipped in canary yellow". At the base of the nipple-tip there is usually a band of opaque white pigment, and tubercles of the same colour. The digestive tract within each cerata has "numerous stubby branches", and halts right at the yellow ceratal cap.

The colour of both rhinophores and oral tentacles are described as "pellucid pale green with opaque white flecks", and overall body colouration described similarly. The cerata colouration are described as such: "In reduced light the [cerata] appear to be brownish or olive green, in normal light they are conspicuously transparent". The digestive tract within the cerata are olive green.

== Distribution ==
This species was described from Indonesia, and its synonym Aeolidia edmondsoni described from Waikiki, Hawai'i, where it was eating the coral Porites compressa. It was previously treated as a synonym of Phestilla lugubris but is now considered distinct due to differences in larval development and adult morphology.
