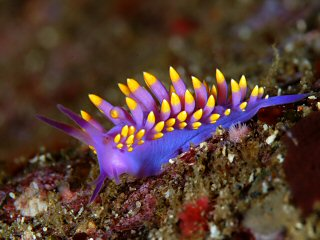
- Trinchesia sibogae

Scientific classification
- Kingdom: Animalia
- Phylum: Mollusca
- Class: Gastropoda
- Order: Nudibranchia
- Suborder: Aeolidacea
- Family: Trinchesiidae
- Genus: Trinchesia
- Species: T. sibogae

Binomial name
- Trinchesia sibogae (Bergh, 1905)

Synonyms
- Hervia sibogae Bergh, 1905; Tenellia sibogae (Bergh, 1905); Cuthona sibogae (Bergh, 1905)

= Trinchesia sibogae =

Species of gastropod

Trinchesia sibogae is a species of sea slug, an aeolid nudibranch, a marine gastropod mollusc in the family Trinchesiidae.

== Taxon Confusion ==
It is very important to note that the sea slug known as 'Trinchesia' sibogae (Bergh 1905) is not, and never has been the sea slug known as Phestilla sibogae Bergh, 1905. The two have been falsely synonymized frequently in literature and references despite being unique organisms that bear no physical resemblance.

The two slugs were both originally described in the same publication by the same author on adjacent pages as Phestilla sibogae and as Hervia sibogae, the latter being the original combination for T. sibogae.

Unfortunately, as Trinchesiidae is a family rife with classification controversy, both the genera Phestilla and Trinchesia have at some point in their histories been merged into Tenellia, which is likely when the worst of the confusion began.

Thankfully, there are recent studies that acknowledge the validity of the two taxa as unique organisms, even explicitly stating the difference in radular structure, with T. sibogae bearing "ark-shaped teeth" characteristic to its genus.

== Distribution ==
This species was described from Kangean Island, Indonesia. Trinchesia sibogae is widespread throughout the tropical waters of the Indo-West Pacific region. This species is large for this family, with a maximum size of 35 mm length.
