= Cuthona methana =

Scientific classification
- Kingdom: Animalia
- Phylum: Mollusca
- Class: Gastropoda
- Order: Nudibranchia
- Suborder: Aeolidacea
- Family: Cuthonidae
- Genus: Cuthona
- Species: C. methana

Binomial name
- Cuthona methana Valdés, Lundsten & N. G. Wilson, 2018

Species of mollusc

Cuthona methana is a species of sea slug in the family Cuthonidae. It is small, only 4 to 6 millimeters in length, with long gills.

Cuthona methana was discovered on a seafloor at Hydrate Ridge, with layers of methane hydrate, which is a mixture of seawater and methane. It was named for being discovered near methane bubbling out of the seafloor, giving the species name "methana".
