= Cuthona destinyae =

Scientific classification
- Kingdom: Animalia
- Phylum: Mollusca
- Class: Gastropoda
- Order: Nudibranchia
- Suborder: Aeolidacea
- Family: Cuthonidae
- Genus: Cuthona
- Species: C. destinyae

Binomial name
- Cuthona destinyae (Hermosillo & Valdés, 2007)

Species of gastropod

Cuthona destinyae is a species of sea slug, an aeolid nudibranch, a marine gastropod mollusc in the family Cuthonidae.

== Distribution ==
This species was described from specimens found at 0 m depth on a ship's hull at Zihuatanejo, Guerrero, Mexico, tropical eastern Pacific.
