= Trinchesia willani =

Scientific classification
- Kingdom: Animalia
- Phylum: Mollusca
- Class: Gastropoda
- Order: Nudibranchia
- Suborder: Aeolidacea
- Family: Trinchesiidae
- Genus: Trinchesia
- Species: T. willani

Binomial name
- Trinchesia willani (Cervera, Garcia-Gomez & Lopez-Gonzalez, 1992)

Synonyms
- Cuthona willani Cervera, García-Gómez & López-González, 1992

Species of gastropod

Trinchesia willani is a species of sea slug, an aeolid nudibranch, a marine gastropod mollusc in the family Trinchesiidae.

== Distribution ==
This species was described from El Portil, Huelva, Spain.
