= Trinchesia henrici =

Scientific classification
- Kingdom: Animalia
- Phylum: Mollusca
- Class: Gastropoda
- Order: Nudibranchia
- Suborder: Aeolidacea
- Family: Trinchesiidae
- Genus: Trinchesia
- Species: T. henrici

Binomial name
- Trinchesia henrici (Eliot, 1916)

Synonyms
- Cuthona henrici Eliot, 1916

Species of gastropod

Trinchesia henrici is a species of sea slug, an aeolid nudibranch, a marine gastropod mollusc in the family Trinchesiidae.

== Distribution ==
This species was described from Chilka Lake, India.
