= Trinchesia lenkae =

Scientific classification
- Kingdom: Animalia
- Phylum: Mollusca
- Class: Gastropoda
- Order: Nudibranchia
- Suborder: Aeolidacea
- Family: Trinchesiidae
- Genus: Trinchesia
- Species: T. lenkae

Binomial name
- Trinchesia lenkae Martynov, 2002

Synonyms
- Tenellia lenkae (Martynov, 2002); Cuthona lenkae (Martynov, 2002)

Species of gastropod

Trinchesia lenkae is a species of sea slug, an aeolid nudibranch, a marine gastropod mollusc in the family Trinchesiidae.

== Distribution ==
This species was described from Peter the Great Bay, Sea of Japan, Russia.
