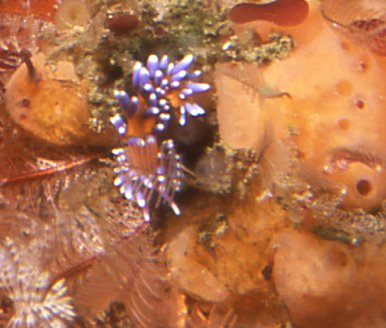
- The lilac colour form of Trinchesia speciosa. Vulcan Rock, Cape Peninsula, South Africa

Scientific classification
- Kingdom: Animalia
- Phylum: Mollusca
- Class: Gastropoda
- Order: Nudibranchia
- Suborder: Aeolidacea
- Family: Trinchesiidae
- Genus: Trinchesia
- Species: T. speciosa

Binomial name
- Trinchesia speciosa (Macnae, 1954)

Synonyms
- Catriona speciosa Macnae, 1954 (basionym); Cuthona speciosa (Macnae, 1954); Tenellia speciosa (Macnae, 1954)

= Trinchesia speciosa =

Species of gastropod

Trinchesia speciosa, common name the "candy nudibranch", is a species of sea slug, an aeolid nudibranch, a marine gastropod mollusc in the family Trinchesiidae.

== Distribution ==
This species was described from two specimens, one found in a rock pool one mile south of Kalk Bay harbour and the other amongst barnacles at Dalebrook, both in False Bay, South Africa. The candy nudibranch is endemic to South Africa. It is found from the Atlantic coast of the Cape Peninsula to Port Elizabeth, intertidally to at least 30 m.

== Description ==
The candy nudibranch is a vividly coloured nudibranch, having a yellow-orange body and turquoise or purple cerata with yellow tips. It grows to 20 mm in length. The rhinophores are smooth and usually also yellow-orange, although they make take on the colours of the cerata. Three distinct colour forms exist, two with blue cerata and yellow to orange rhinophores and another form with lilac cerata and lilac coloured rhinophores and oral tentacles. The colour form or similar species with iridescent blue cerata was identified as Cuthona ornata (now Trinchesia ornata) by Gosliner and as Cuthona speciosa (now Tenellia speciosa) by Rudman, 2002.

== Ecology ==
The candy nudibranch eats hydroids of the genus Sertularella. In common with other aeolid nudibranchs, the cerata of the candy nudibranch aid in respiration but also contain extensions of the digestive system. The candy nudibranch eats the hydroid and passes its nematocysts unharmed through its digestive system to the tips of its cerata. Here the nematocysts mature and are then used by the nudibranch for its own defence. It is probable that the bright colours of the candy nudibranch serve to advertise to predators that it is toxic.

Candy nudibranchs are hermaphrodites. Their egg mass is a spiral collar of orange eggs.
