= Trinchesia taita =

Scientific classification
- Kingdom: Animalia
- Phylum: Mollusca
- Class: Gastropoda
- Order: Nudibranchia
- Suborder: Aeolidacea
- Family: Trinchesiidae
- Genus: Trinchesia
- Species: T. taita

Binomial name
- Trinchesia taita Edmunds, 1970

Synonyms
- Tenellia taita (Edmunds, 1970)

Species of gastropod

Trinchesia taita is a species of sea slug, an aeolid nudibranch, a marine gastropod mollusc in the family Trinchesiidae.

== Distribution ==
This species was described from shallow water at Oyster Bay, Dar es Salaam, Tanzania.
