= Cuthona giarannae =

Scientific classification
- Kingdom: Animalia
- Phylum: Mollusca
- Class: Gastropoda
- Order: Nudibranchia
- Suborder: Aeolidacea
- Family: Cuthonidae
- Genus: Cuthona
- Species: C. giarannae

Binomial name
- Cuthona giarannae (Valdés, Moran & Woods, 2012)

Species of gastropod

Cuthona giarannae is a species of sea slug, an aeolid nudibranch, a marine gastropod mollusc in the family Cuthonidae.

== Distribution ==
This species was described from the sewage outfall, McMurdo Sound, Ross Sea, Antarctica 77°51′31.95″S 166°40′47.51″E. It is also reported from Arrival Heights, McMurdo Sound, Ross Sea, Antarctica, 77°50′14.29″S 166°37′59.14″E.
