= Trinchesia odhneri =

Scientific classification
- Kingdom: Animalia
- Phylum: Mollusca
- Class: Gastropoda
- Order: Nudibranchia
- Suborder: Aeolidacea
- Family: Trinchesiidae
- Genus: Trinchesia
- Species: T. odhneri

Binomial name
- Trinchesia odhneri (Er. Marcus, 1959)

Synonyms
- Cuthona odhneri Er. Marcus, 1959

Species of gastropod

Trinchesia odhneri is a species of sea slug, an aeolid nudibranch, a marine gastropod mollusc in the family Trinchesiidae.

== Distribution ==
This species was described from Puerto Montt, Chile. In 2003, the species had not been found subsequent to the original description.
