= Cuthona norvegica =

Scientific classification
- Kingdom: Animalia
- Phylum: Mollusca
- Class: Gastropoda
- Order: Nudibranchia
- Suborder: Aeolidacea
- Family: Cuthonidae
- Genus: Cuthona
- Species: C. norvegica

Binomial name
- Cuthona norvegica (Odhner, 1929)

Synonyms
- Cuthonella norvegica Odhner, 1929

Species of gastropod

Cuthona norvegica is a species of sea slug, an aeolid nudibranch, a marine gastropod mollusc in the family Cuthonidae.

== Distribution ==
This species was described from Norway.
