= Trinchesia correai =

Scientific classification
- Kingdom: Animalia
- Phylum: Mollusca
- Class: Gastropoda
- Order: Nudibranchia
- Suborder: Aeolidacea
- Family: Trinchesiidae
- Genus: Trinchesia
- Species: T. correai

Binomial name
- Trinchesia correai (Ortea, Caballer & Moro, 2002)

Synonyms
- Cuthona correai Ortea, Caballer, & Moro, 2002

Species of gastropod

Trinchesia correai is a species of sea slug, an aeolid nudibranch, a marine gastropod mollusc in the family Trinchesiidae.

== Distribution ==
This species was described from Los Cristianos, Tenerife, Canary Islands.
