= Cuthona fructuosa =

Scientific classification
- Kingdom: Animalia
- Phylum: Mollusca
- Class: Gastropoda
- Order: Nudibranchia
- Suborder: Aeolidacea
- Family: Cuthonidae
- Genus: Cuthona
- Species: C. fructuosa

Binomial name
- Cuthona fructuosa (Bergh, 1892)

Synonyms
- Cratena fructuosa Bergh, 1892

Species of gastropod

Cuthona fructuosa is a species of sea slug, an aeolid nudibranch, a marine gastropod mollusc in the family Cuthonidae.

== Distribution ==
This species was described from a single specimen taken on floating Sargassum in the Sargasso Sea.
