= Trinchesia iris =

Scientific classification
- Kingdom: Animalia
- Phylum: Mollusca
- Class: Gastropoda
- Order: Nudibranchia
- Suborder: Aeolidacea
- Family: Trinchesiidae
- Genus: Trinchesia
- Species: T. iris

Binomial name
- Trinchesia iris (Edmunds & Just, 1983)

Synonyms
- Cuthona iris Edmunds & Just, 1983

Species of gastropod

Trinchesia iris is a species of sea slug, an aeolid nudibranch, a marine gastropod mollusc in the family Trinchesiidae.

== Distribution ==
This species was described from the reef flat outside Bellairs Research Institute, Barbados.

== Description ==
The typical adult size of this species is 5–10 mm.
