= Trinchesia leopardina =

Scientific classification
- Kingdom: Animalia
- Phylum: Mollusca
- Class: Gastropoda
- Order: Nudibranchia
- Suborder: Aeolidacea
- Family: Trinchesiidae
- Genus: Trinchesia
- Species: T. leopardina

Binomial name
- Trinchesia leopardina (Vayssière, 1888)

Synonyms
- Amphorina alberti var. leopardina Vayssière, 1888; Cuthona leopardina Vayssière, 1888

Species of gastropod

Trinchesia leopardina is a species of sea slug, an aeolid nudibranch, a marine gastropod mollusc in the family Trinchesiidae.

== Distribution ==
This species was described from Marseille, France. In the original description it was also reported from the Rade de Villefranche-sur-Mer, Genoa, Italy, and near Trieste.

== Description ==
The typical adult size of this species is 10 mm.
