= Cuthona antarctica =

Scientific classification
- Kingdom: Animalia
- Phylum: Mollusca
- Class: Gastropoda
- Order: Nudibranchia
- Suborder: Aeolidacea
- Family: Cuthonidae
- Genus: Cuthona
- Species: C. antarctica

Binomial name
- Cuthona antarctica (Pfeffer in Martens & Pfeffer, 1886)

Synonyms
- Aeolis antarctica Pfeffer, 1886

Species of gastropod

Cuthona antarctica is a species of sea slug, an aeolid nudibranch, a marine gastropod mollusc in the family Fionidae.

== Distribution ==
This species was described from Antarctica.
