= Trinchesia valentini =

Scientific classification
- Kingdom: Animalia
- Phylum: Mollusca
- Class: Gastropoda
- Order: Nudibranchia
- Suborder: Aeolidacea
- Family: Trinchesiidae
- Genus: Trinchesia
- Species: T. valentini

Binomial name
- Trinchesia valentini (Eliot, 1907)

Synonyms
- Cratena valentini Eliot, 1907; Cuthona valentini Eliot, 1907; Tergipes valentini (Eliot, 1907)

Species of gastropod

Trinchesia valentini is a species of sea slug, an aeolid nudibranch, a marine gastropod mollusc in the family Trinchesiidae.

== Distribution ==
This species was described from the Falkland Islands. It has also been reported from Chile.
