= Trinchesia hamanni =

Scientific classification
- Kingdom: Animalia
- Phylum: Mollusca
- Class: Gastropoda
- Order: Nudibranchia
- Suborder: Aeolidacea
- Family: Trinchesiidae
- Genus: Trinchesia
- Species: T. hamanni

Binomial name
- Trinchesia hamanni (Behrens, 1987)

Synonyms
- Cuthona hamanni Behrens, 1987

Species of gastropod

Trinchesia hamanni is a species of sea slug, an aeolid nudibranch, a marine gastropod mollusc in the family Trinchesiidae.

== Distribution ==
This species was described from La Jolla, California.

== Description ==
The typical adult size of this species is 14 mm.
