= Cuthona lizae =

Scientific classification
- Kingdom: Animalia
- Phylum: Mollusca
- Class: Gastropoda
- Order: Nudibranchia
- Suborder: Aeolidacea
- Family: Cuthonidae
- Genus: Cuthona
- Species: C. lizae

Binomial name
- Cuthona lizae (Angulo-Campillo & Valdés, 2003)

Species of gastropod

Cuthona lizae is a species of sea slug, an aeolid nudibranch, a marine gastropod mollusc in the family Cuthonidae.

== Distribution ==
This species was described from Ensenada de los Muertos, south of La Paz, Baja California Sur, Mexico.

== Description ==
The typical adult size of this species is 3–5 mm.
