= Cuthona georgiana =

Scientific classification
- Kingdom: Animalia
- Phylum: Mollusca
- Class: Gastropoda
- Order: Nudibranchia
- Suborder: Aeolidacea
- Family: Cuthonidae
- Genus: Cuthona
- Species: C. georgiana

Binomial name
- Cuthona georgiana (Pfeffer, 1886)

Synonyms
- Aeolis antarctica Pfeffer, 1886; Cratena exigua (Theile, 1912)

Species of gastropod

Cuthona georgiana is a species of sea slug, an aeolid nudibranch, a marine gastropod mollusc in the family Cuthonidae.

== Distribution ==
This species was described from South Georgia, Antarctica. It is reported from the Ross Sea, Kerguelen, South Georgia and southern Chile.
