= Trinchesia akibai =

Scientific classification
- Kingdom: Animalia
- Phylum: Mollusca
- Class: Gastropoda
- Order: Nudibranchia
- Suborder: Aeolidacea
- Family: Trinchesiidae
- Genus: Trinchesia
- Species: T. akibai

Binomial name
- Trinchesia akibai (Baba, 1984)

Synonyms
- Cuthona akibai Baba, 1984

Species of gastropod

Trinchesia akibai is a species of sea slug, an aeolid nudibranch, a marine gastropod mollusc in the family Trinchesiidae.

== Distribution ==
This species was described from Sagami Bay, Japan.

== Description ==
The typical adult size of this species is 8 mm.
