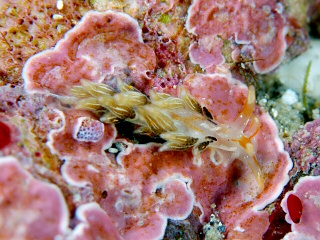

Scientific classification
- Kingdom: Animalia
- Phylum: Mollusca
- Class: Gastropoda
- Order: Nudibranchia
- Suborder: Aeolidacea
- Family: Trinchesiidae
- Genus: Trinchesia
- Species: T. puellula

Binomial name
- Trinchesia puellula (Baba, 1955)

Synonyms
- Cratena puellula (Baba, 1955); Catriona puellula (Baba, 1955); Cuthona puellula (Baba, 1955)

= Trinchesia puellula =

Species of gastropod

Trinchesia puellula is a species of sea slug, an aeolid nudibranch, a marine gastropod mollusc in the family Trinchesiidae.

== Distribution ==
This species was described from Japan. It has been reported from the Japan Sea coast at Echizen Coast, Fukui Prefecture, north-west coast of Honshu and from the Pacific Ocean coast at Hachijo Island. Similar looking animals have been found at Mooloolaba, Sunshine Coast, Queensland, Australia.
