= Trinchesia sororum =

Scientific classification
- Kingdom: Animalia
- Phylum: Mollusca
- Class: Gastropoda
- Order: Nudibranchia
- Suborder: Aeolidacea
- Family: Trinchesiidae
- Genus: Trinchesia
- Species: T. sororum

Binomial name
- Trinchesia sororum Burn, 1964

Synonyms
- Tenellia sororum (Burn, 1964)

Species of gastropod

Trinchesia sororum is a species of sea slug, an aeolid nudibranch, a marine gastropod mollusc in the family Trinchesiidae.

== Distribution ==
This species was described from Australia.
