= Trinchesia diminutiva =

Scientific classification
- Kingdom: Animalia
- Phylum: Mollusca
- Class: Gastropoda
- Order: Nudibranchia
- Suborder: Aeolidacea
- Family: Trinchesiidae
- Genus: Trinchesia
- Species: T. diminutiva

Binomial name
- Trinchesia diminutiva (Gosliner, 1980)

Synonyms
- Cuthona diminutiva Gosliner, 1980

Species of gastropod

Trinchesia diminutiva is a species of sea slug, an aeolid nudibranch, a marine gastropod mollusc in the family Trinchesiidae.

== Distribution ==
This species was described from the Hawaii Institute of Marine Biology, Coconut Island, Oahu, Hawaii.
