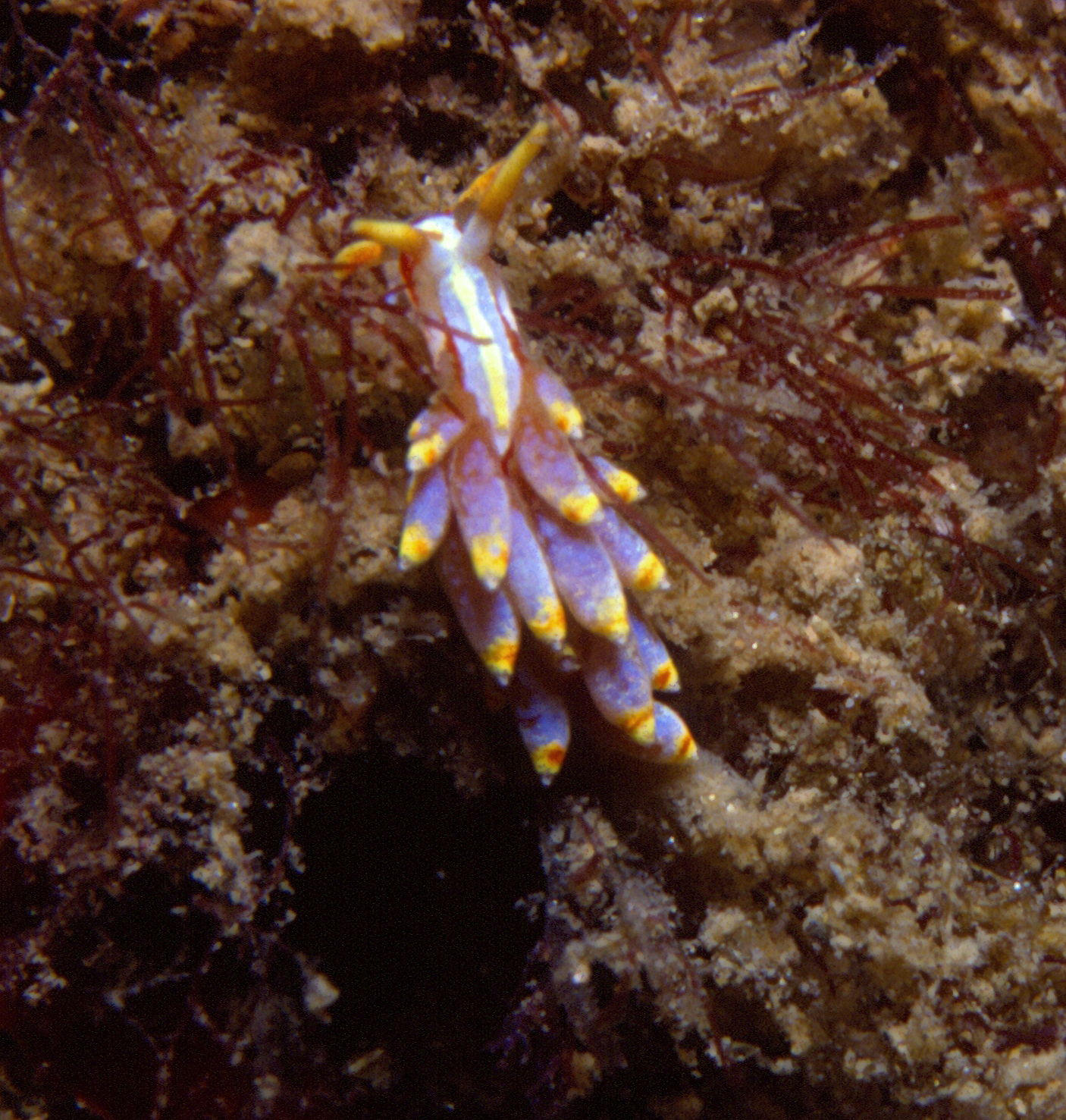
- Banyuls-sur-Mer, France

Scientific classification
- Kingdom: Animalia
- Phylum: Mollusca
- Class: Gastropoda
- Order: Nudibranchia
- Suborder: Aeolidacea
- Family: Trinchesiidae
- Genus: Trinchesia
- Species: T. genovae

Binomial name
- Trinchesia genovae (O'Donoghue, 1926)

Synonyms
- Cratena genovae O'Donoghue, 1929; Cuthona genovae (O'Donoghue, 1929); Tenellia genovae (O'Donoghue, 1929)

= Trinchesia genovae =

Species of gastropod

Trinchesia genovae is a species of sea slug, an aeolid nudibranch, a marine gastropod mollusc in the family Trinchesiidae.

== Distribution ==
This species was described from Genoa, Italy. It has been reported from the NE Atlantic from Mulroy Bay, County Donegal and Lough Hyne, County Cork, Ireland south to Portugal and in the Mediterranean Sea.

== Description ==
This species was previously confused with Trinchesia foliata. The typical adult size of this species is 5–6 mm.
