= Cuthona claviformis =

Scientific classification
- Kingdom: Animalia
- Phylum: Mollusca
- Class: Gastropoda
- Order: Nudibranchia
- Suborder: Aeolidacea
- Family: Cuthonidae
- Genus: Cuthona
- Species: C. claviformis

Binomial name
- Cuthona claviformis (Vicente, 1974)

Species of gastropod

Cuthona claviformis is a species of sea slug, an aeolid nudibranch, a marine gastropod mollusc in the family Cuthonidae.

== Distribution ==
This species was described from Antarctica.
