= Trinchesia viridiana =

Scientific classification
- Kingdom: Animalia
- Phylum: Mollusca
- Class: Gastropoda
- Order: Nudibranchia
- Suborder: Aeolidacea
- Family: Trinchesiidae
- Genus: Trinchesia
- Species: T. viridiana

Binomial name
- Trinchesia viridiana (Burn, 1962)

Synonyms
- Catriona viridiana Burn, 1962; Tenellia viridiana (Burn, 1962)

Species of gastropod

Trinchesia viridiana is a species of sea slug, an aeolid nudibranch, a marine gastropod mollusc in the family Trinchesiidae.

== Distribution ==
This marine species is endemic from Australia.
