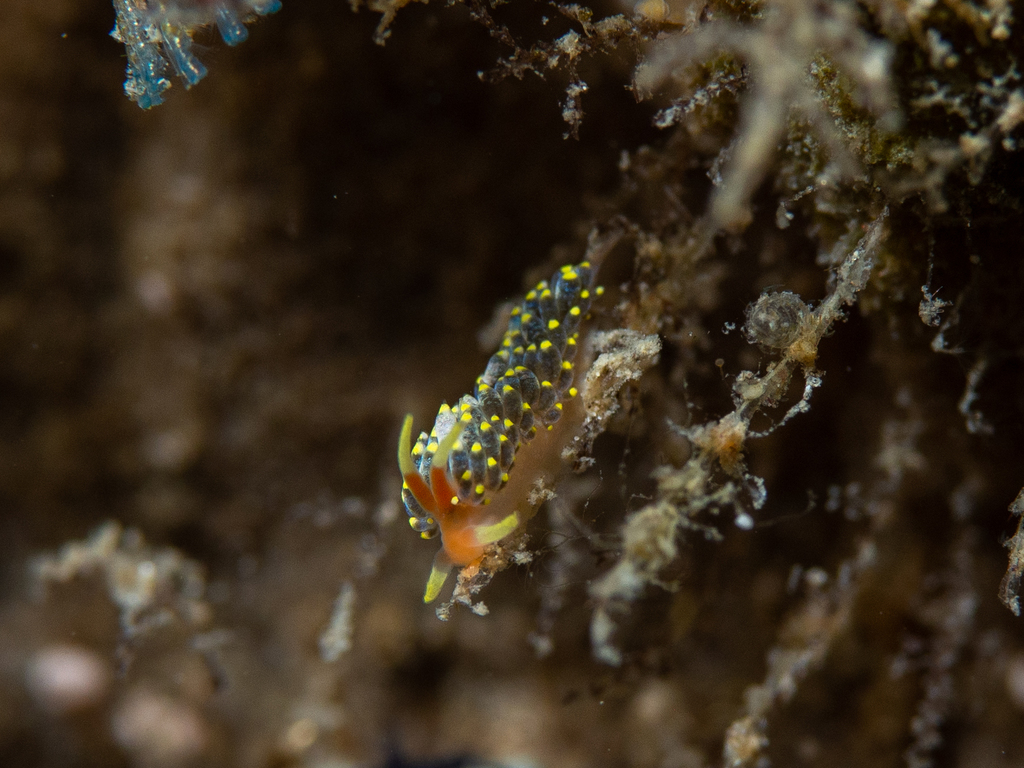

Scientific classification
- Kingdom: Animalia
- Phylum: Mollusca
- Class: Gastropoda
- Order: Nudibranchia
- Suborder: Aeolidacea
- Family: Trinchesiidae
- Genus: Trinchesia
- Species: T. catachroma

Binomial name
- Trinchesia catachroma (Burn, 1963)

Synonyms
- Catriona catachroma Burn, 1963 Tenellia catachroma Burn, 1963

= Trinchesia catachroma =

Species of gastropod

Trinchesia catachroma is a species of sea slug, an aeolid nudibranch, a marine gastropod mollusc in the family Trinchesiidae.

== Distribution ==
This species was described from Australia.
