= Trinchesia divanica =

Scientific classification
- Kingdom: Animalia
- Phylum: Mollusca
- Class: Gastropoda
- Order: Nudibranchia
- Suborder: Aeolidacea
- Family: Trinchesiidae
- Genus: Trinchesia
- Species: T. divanica

Binomial name
- Trinchesia divanica Martynov, 2002

Synonyms
- Cuthona divanica (Martynov, 2002) Tenellia divanica (Martynov, 2002)

Species of gastropod

Trinchesia divanica is a species of sea slug, an aeolid nudibranch, a marine gastropod mollusc in the family Trinchesiidae.

== Distribution ==
This species was described from Peter the Great Bay, Sea of Japan, Russia.
