= Trinchesia longi =

Scientific classification
- Kingdom: Animalia
- Phylum: Mollusca
- Class: Gastropoda
- Order: Nudibranchia
- Suborder: Aeolidacea
- Family: Trinchesiidae
- Genus: Trinchesia
- Species: T. longi

Binomial name
- Trinchesia longi (Behrens, 1985)

Synonyms
- Cuthona longi Behrens, 1985

Species of gastropod

Trinchesia longi is a species of sea slug, an aeolid nudibranch, a marine gastropod mollusc in the family Trinchesiidae.

== Distribution ==
This species was described from Isla Raza, Baja California, Mexico, 28°48′00″N 113°00′00″W.

== Description ==
The adult size of this species is up to 32 mm in length. The cerata are cored with green digestive gland and have surface rings of pale blue, yellow-gold and red pigment and white tips.
