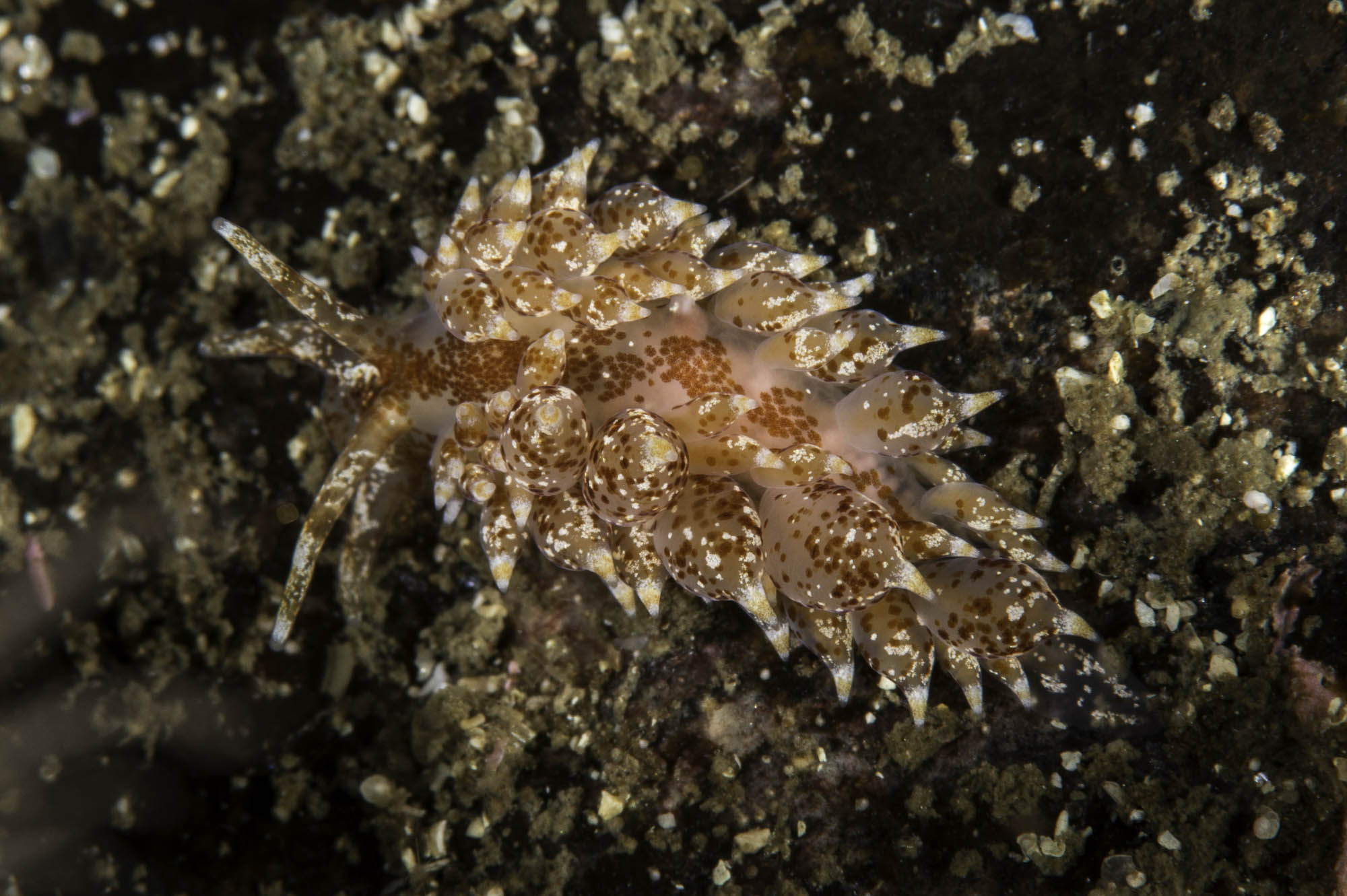
- A live specimen of Trinchesia pallida

Scientific classification
- Kingdom: Animalia
- Phylum: Mollusca
- Class: Gastropoda
- Order: Nudibranchia
- Suborder: Aeolidacea
- Family: Trinchesiidae
- Genus: Trinchesia
- Species: T. pallida

Binomial name
- Trinchesia pallida (Eliot, 1906)

Synonyms
- Amphorina pallida Eliot, 1906; Cuthona pallida Eliot, 1906

= Trinchesia pallida =

Species of gastropod

Trinchesia pallida is a species of sea slug, an aeolid nudibranch, a marine gastropod mollusc in the family Trinchesiidae.

This species was described from the Cape Verde Islands.

As of 2025, this animal is currently placed in Trinchesia pending genus revision, with the understanding that it, along with the rest of Trinchesia sensu latissimo, belong to yet undescribed genera.
