= Trinchesia barbadiana =

Scientific classification
- Kingdom: Animalia
- Phylum: Mollusca
- Class: Gastropoda
- Order: Nudibranchia
- Suborder: Aeolidacea
- Family: Trinchesiidae
- Genus: Trinchesia
- Species: T. barbadiana

Binomial name
- Trinchesia barbadiana (Edmunds & Just, 1983)

Synonyms
- Cuthona barbadiana Edmunds & Just, 1983

Species of gastropod

Trinchesia barbadiana is a species of sea slug, an aeolid nudibranch, a marine gastropod mollusk in the family Trinchesiidae.

== Distribution ==
This species was described from 1 metre (3 ft 3 in) depth on algae outside the Bellairs Research Institute, Barbados.
