= Trinchesia fidenciae =

Scientific classification
- Kingdom: Animalia
- Phylum: Mollusca
- Class: Gastropoda
- Order: Nudibranchia
- Suborder: Aeolidacea
- Family: Trinchesiidae
- Genus: Trinchesia
- Species: T. fidenciae

Binomial name
- Trinchesia fidenciae (Ortea, Moro & Espinosa, 1999)

Synonyms
- Eubranchus fidenciae Ortea, Moro & Espinosa, 1999; Cuthona fidenciae Ortea, Moro & Espinosa, 1999

Species of gastropod

Trinchesia fidenciae is a species of sea slug, an aeolid nudibranch, a marine gastropod mollusc in the family Trinchesiidae.

== Distribution ==
This species was described from Playa del barranco de Avalos, Isla de La Gomera, the Canary Islands. It has been reported from Caloura, Sao Miguel Island, Azores and Montana Roja, Tenerife.
