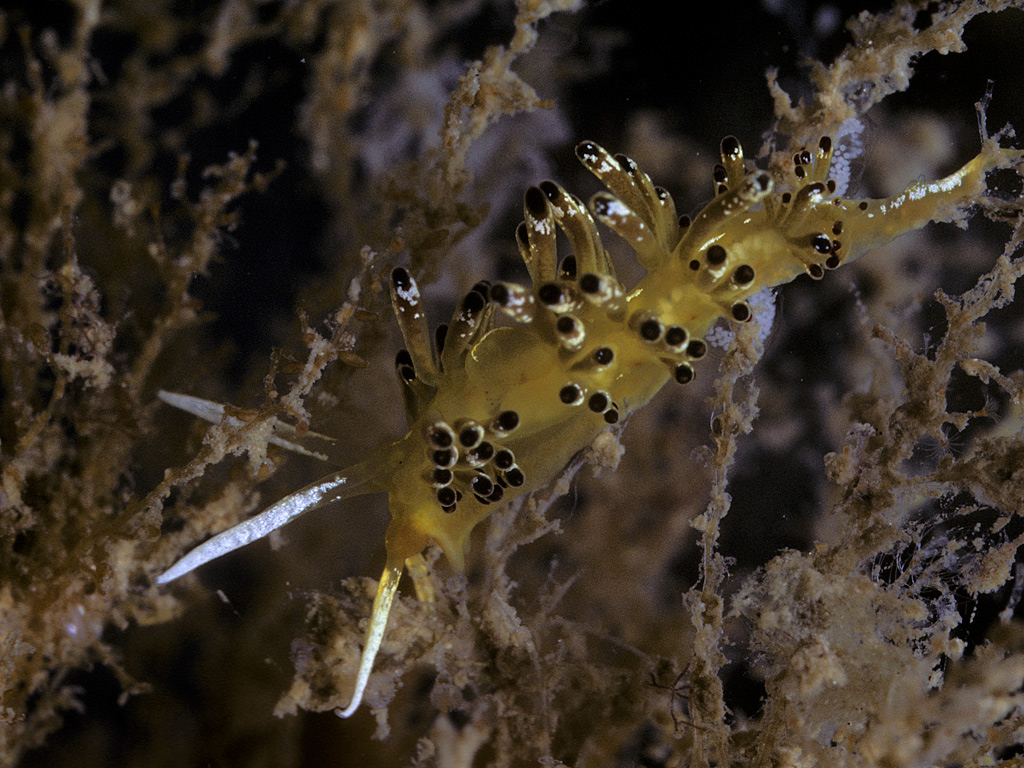
- Trinchesia ocellata

Scientific classification
- Kingdom: Animalia
- Phylum: Mollusca
- Class: Gastropoda
- Order: Nudibranchia
- Suborder: Aeolidacea
- Family: Trinchesiidae
- Genus: Trinchesia
- Species: T. ocellata

Binomial name
- Trinchesia ocellata Schmekel, 1966

Synonyms
- Tenellia ocellata Schmekel, 1966; Cuthona ocellata (Schmekel, 1966)

= Trinchesia ocellata =

Species of gastropod

Trinchesia ocellata is a species of sea slug, an aeolid nudibranch, a marine gastropod mollusc in the family Trinchesiidae.

== Distribution ==
This species was described from the Gulf of Naples, Italy. It has been recorded on the coasts of the Mediterranean Sea from Italy to Spain.

== Ecology ==
Trinchesia ocellata is found on a number of colonial hydroids including Sertularella and Halecium labrosum.
