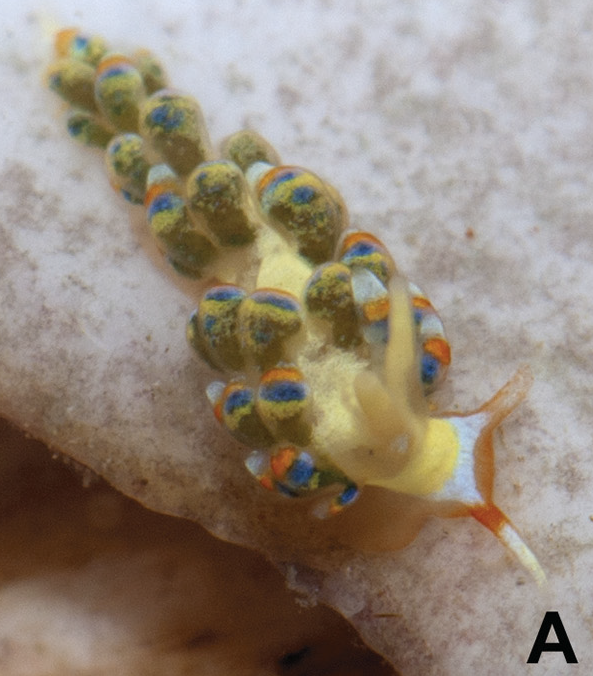

Scientific classification
- Kingdom: Animalia
- Phylum: Mollusca
- Class: Gastropoda
- Order: Nudibranchia
- Suborder: Aeolidacea
- Family: Trinchesiidae
- Genus: Trinchesia
- Species: T. kanga

Binomial name
- Trinchesia kanga Edmunds, 1970

Synonyms
- Tenellia kanga Edmunds, 1970; Cuthona kanga Edmunds, 1970

= Trinchesia kanga =

Species of gastropod

Trinchesia kanga is a species of sea slug, an aeolid nudibranch, a marine gastropod mollusc in the family Trinchesiidae.

== Distribution ==
This species was described from the President's Jetty, Dar es Salaam, Tanzania. It has been reported from Réunion Island.

== Description ==
The typical adult size of this species is 5 mm. It has been reported to grow to 12 mm.
