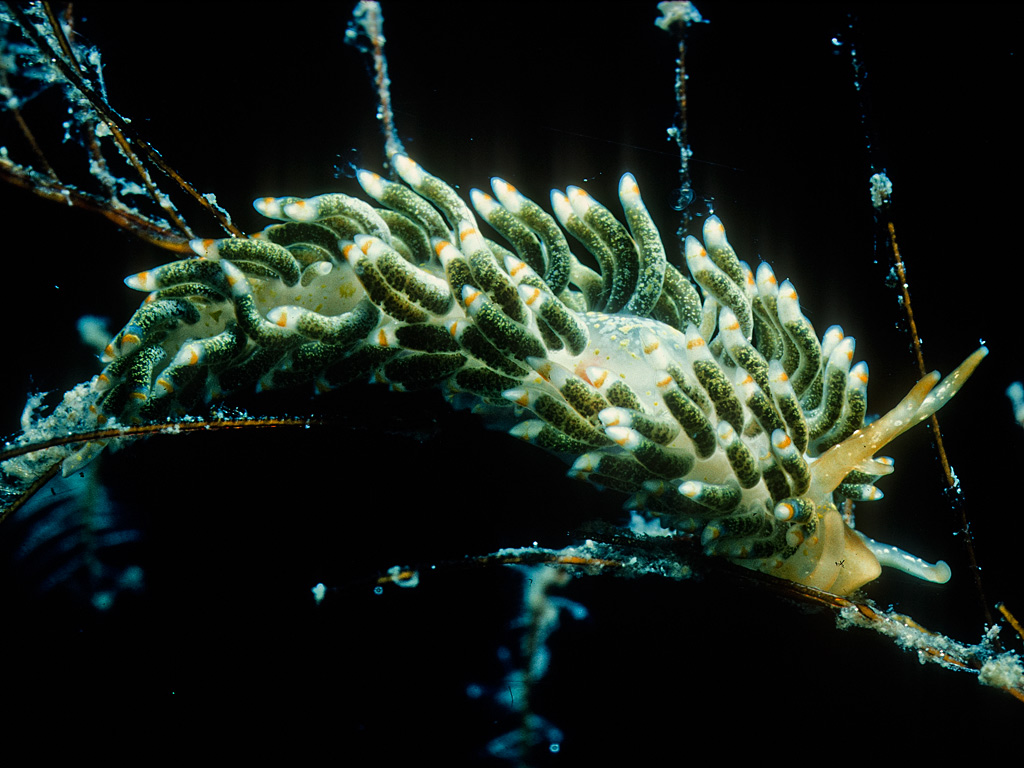
- The nudibranch Trinchesia diversicolor, Mit Kok Tsui, Hong Kong.

Scientific classification
- Kingdom: Animalia
- Phylum: Mollusca
- Class: Gastropoda
- Order: Nudibranchia
- Suborder: Aeolidacea
- Family: Trinchesiidae
- Genus: Trinchesia
- Species: T. diversicolor

Binomial name
- Trinchesia diversicolor (Baba, 1975)

Synonyms
- Tenellia diversicolor Baba, 1975; Cuthona diversicolor (Baba, 1975)

= Trinchesia diversicolor =

Species of gastropod

Trinchesia diversicolor is a species of sea slug, an aeolid nudibranch, a marine gastropod mollusc in the family Trinchesiidae.

== Distribution ==
This species was described from the shore of Akasumi, west coast of the Noto Peninsula, Japan. The original description contains records from the Japan Sea coast of Middle Japan: Sado Island, Toyama Bay and Oki Island, Shimane Prefecture. Also reported from South Korea and Hong Kong.

== Ecology ==
Trinchesia diversicolor feeds on a hydroid, a species of Aglaophenia, family Aglaopheniidae.
