= Trinchesia kuiterorum =

Scientific classification
- Kingdom: Animalia
- Phylum: Mollusca
- Class: Gastropoda
- Order: Nudibranchia
- Suborder: Aeolidacea
- Family: Trinchesiidae
- Genus: Trinchesia
- Species: T. kuiterorum

Binomial name
- Trinchesia kuiterorum (Rudman, 1981)

Synonyms
- Tenellia kuiteri (Rudman, 1981); Tenellia kuiterorum (Rudman, 1981); Cuthona kuiteri Rudman, 1981; Trinchesia kuiteri (Rudman, 1981)

Species of gastropod

Trinchesia kuiterorum is a species of sea slug, an aeolid nudibranch, a marine gastropod mollusc in the family Trinchesiidae.

== Distribution ==
This species was described from Green Point, Sydney Harbour, New South Wales, Australia.

== Ecology ==
Trinchesia kuiterorum feeds on the sponge associated solitary hydroid Zyzzyzus spongicola. In a remarkable adaptation the cerata have tentacle-like filaments which mimic the tentacles of the hydroid.
