= Trinchesia millenae =

Scientific classification
- Kingdom: Animalia
- Phylum: Mollusca
- Class: Gastropoda
- Order: Nudibranchia
- Suborder: Aeolidacea
- Family: Trinchesiidae
- Genus: Trinchesia
- Species: T. millenae

Binomial name
- Trinchesia millenae (Hermosillo & Valdes, 2007)

Synonyms
- Cuthona millenae Hermosillo & Valdes, 2007; Tenellia millenae Hermosillo & Valdes, 2007

Species of gastropod

Trinchesia millenae is a species of sea slug, an aeolid nudibranch, a marine gastropod mollusc in the family Trinchesiidae.

== Distribution ==
This species was described from Islas Revillagigedo, Colima, Mexico in the tropical eastern Pacific region.
