= Trinchesia miniostriata =

Scientific classification
- Kingdom: Animalia
- Phylum: Mollusca
- Class: Gastropoda
- Order: Nudibranchia
- Suborder: Aeolidacea
- Family: Trinchesiidae
- Genus: Trinchesia
- Species: T. miniostriata

Binomial name
- Trinchesia miniostriata Schmekel, 1968

Synonyms
- Tenellia miniostriata (Schmekel, 1968); Cuthona miniostriata (Schmekel, 1968)

Species of gastropod

Trinchesia miniostriata is a species of sea slug, an aeolid nudibranch, a marine gastropod mollusk in the family Trinchesiidae.

== Distribution ==
This species was described from the Gulf of Naples, Italy. It has subsequently been reported from the east and south coasts of Spain.
