= Trinchesia zelandica =

Scientific classification
- Kingdom: Animalia
- Phylum: Mollusca
- Class: Gastropoda
- Order: Nudibranchia
- Suborder: Aeolidacea
- Family: Trinchesiidae
- Genus: Trinchesia
- Species: T. zelandica

Binomial name
- Trinchesia zelandica Odhner, 1924

Synonyms
- Cuthona zelandica Odhner, 1924; Tenellia zelandica (Odhner, 1924)

Species of gastropod

Trinchesia zelandica is a species of small sea slug or aeolid nudibranch, a marine gastropod mollusc in the family Trinchesiidae.

== Distribution ==
This species was described from Auckland Island. It has not been found since the original description.
