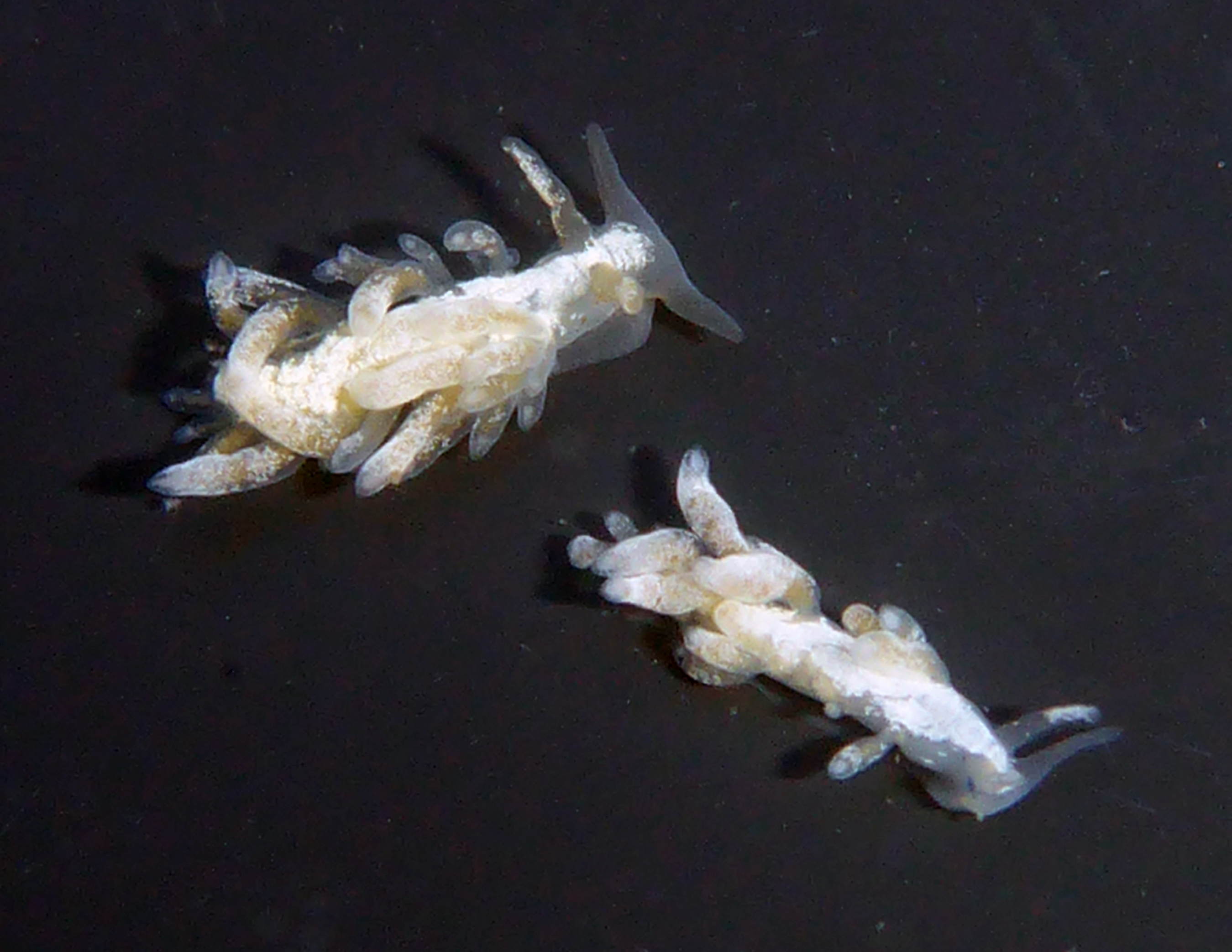
- Trinchesia albocrusta

Scientific classification
- Kingdom: Animalia
- Phylum: Mollusca
- Class: Gastropoda
- Order: Nudibranchia
- Suborder: Aeolidacea
- Family: Trinchesiidae
- Genus: Trinchesia
- Species: T. albocrusta

Binomial name
- Trinchesia albocrusta (MacFarland, 1966)

Synonyms
- Cratena albocrust MacFarland, 1966; Cuthona albocrusta (MacFarland, 1966); Tenellia albocrusta (MacFarland, 1966)

= Trinchesia albocrusta =

Species of gastropod

Trinchesia albocrusta, common name white-crusted aeolid, is a species of sea slug, an aeolid nudibranch, a marine gastropod mollusc in the family Trinchesiidae.

== Distribution ==
This species was described from Pacific Grove, California, United States. It has been recorded along the Eastern Pacific coastline of North America from Prince William Sound, Alaska to La Paz, Baja California, Mexico.
