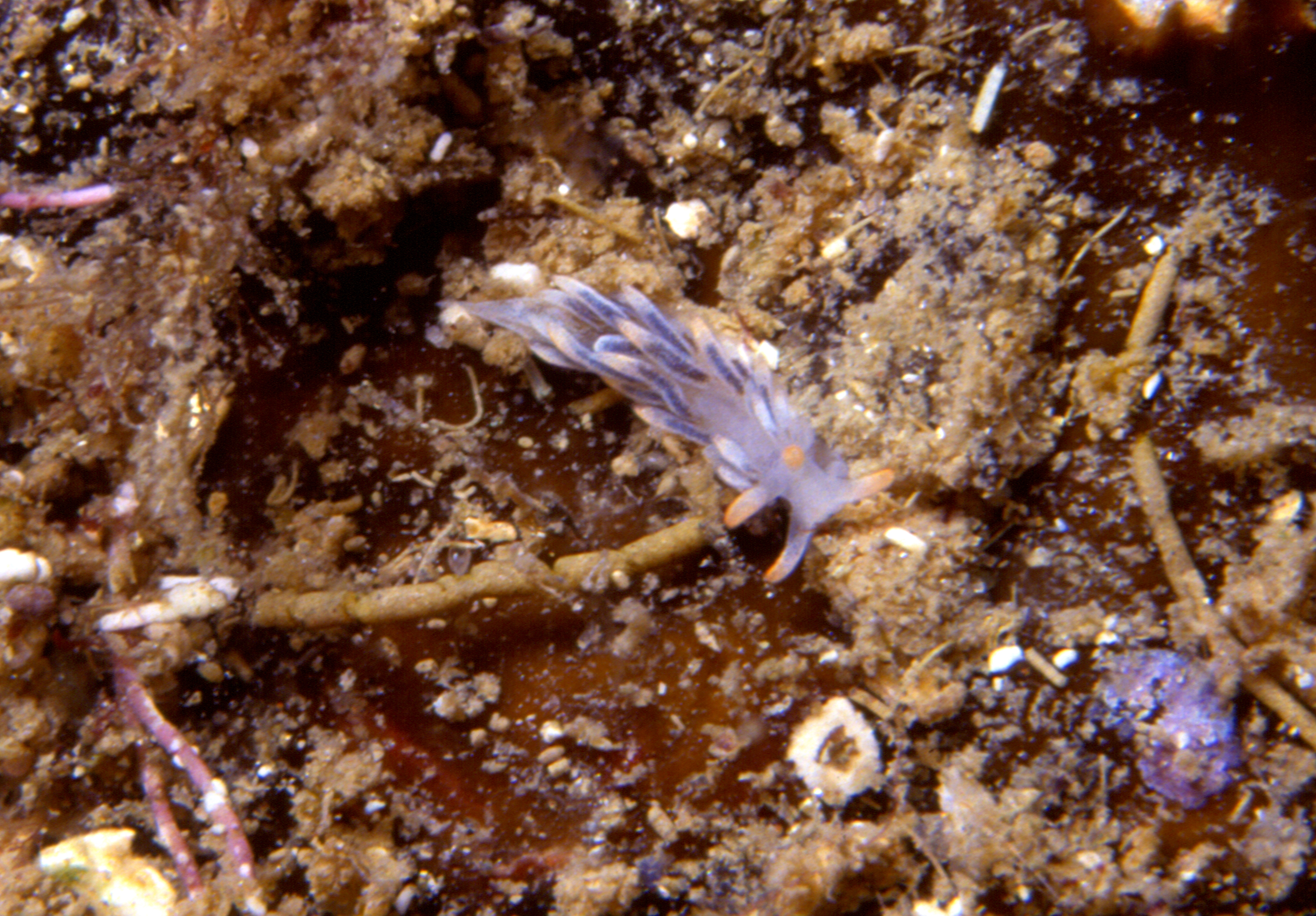
- Banyuls-sur-Mer, France.

Scientific classification
- Kingdom: Animalia
- Phylum: Mollusca
- Class: Gastropoda
- Order: Nudibranchia
- Suborder: Aeolidacea
- Family: Trinchesiidae
- Genus: Trinchesia
- Species: T. granosa

Binomial name
- Trinchesia granosa (Schmekel, 1966)

Synonyms
- Tenellia granosa Schmekel, 1966; Cuthona granosa (Schmekel, 1966)

= Trinchesia granosa =

Species of gastropod

Trinchesia granosa is a species of sea slug, an aeolid nudibranch, a marine gastropod mollusc in the family Trinchesiidae.

== Distribution ==
This species was described from the Gulf of Naples, Italy. It has been recorded on the coasts of the Mediterranean Sea from Italy to south-west France.
