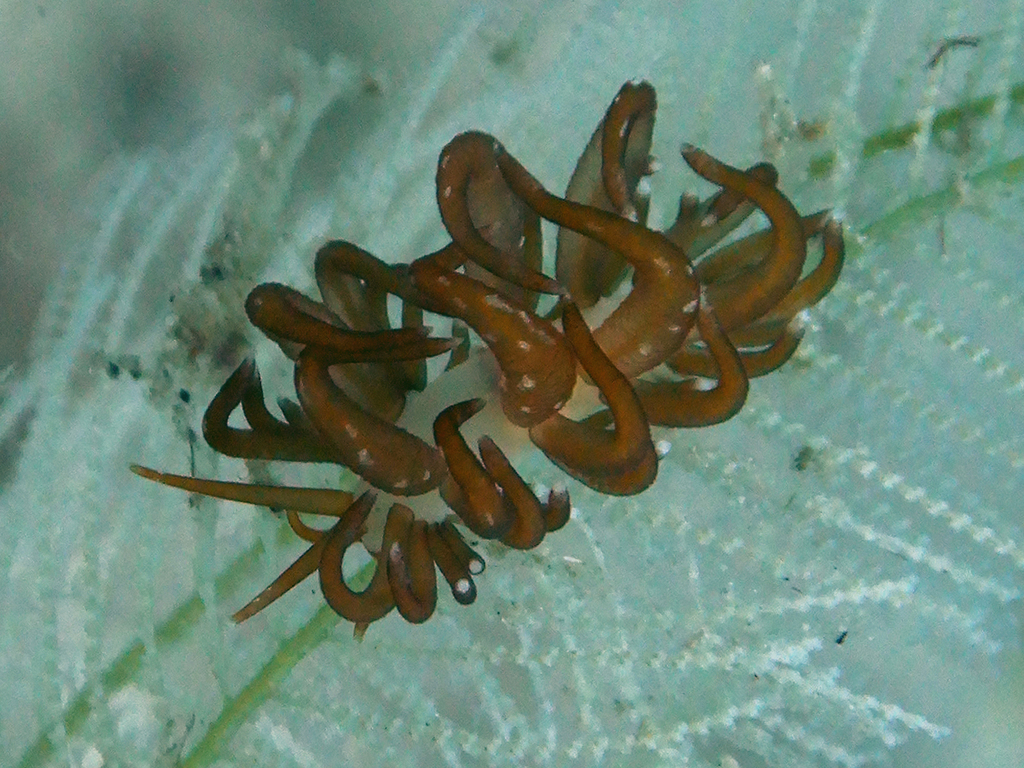

Scientific classification
- Kingdom: Animalia
- Phylum: Mollusca
- Class: Gastropoda
- Order: Nudibranchia
- Suborder: Aeolidacea
- Family: Trinchesiidae
- Genus: Trinchesia
- Species: T. acinosa

Binomial name
- Trinchesia acinosa (Risbec, 1928)

Synonyms
- Aeolidia acinosa Risbec, 1928; Cuthona acinosa Risbec, 1928; Tenellia acinosa Risbec, 1928

= Trinchesia acinosa =

Species of gastropod

Trinchesia acinosa is a species of sea slug, an aeolid nudibranch, a marine gastropod mollusc in the family Trinchesiidae.

== Distribution ==
This species was described from New Caledonia. It has been reported from Japan and the Marshall Islands.

== Description ==
The typical adult size of this species is 10–12 mm. The body is opaque white and the cerata, rhinophores, front of the head and oral tentacles are pale to bright orange.
