= Trinchesia virens =

Scientific classification
- Kingdom: Animalia
- Phylum: Mollusca
- Class: Gastropoda
- Order: Nudibranchia
- Suborder: Aeolidacea
- Family: Trinchesiidae
- Genus: Trinchesia
- Species: T. virens

Binomial name
- Trinchesia virens (MacFarland, 1966)

Synonyms
- Cratena virens MacFarland, 1966; Cuthona virens (MacFarland, 1966); Tenellia virens (MacFarland, 1966)

Species of gastropod

Trinchesia virens is a species of sea slug, an aeolid nudibranch, a marine gastropod mollusc in the family Trinchesiidae.

== Distribution ==
This species was described from Point Pinos, Monterey Bay, California, United States. It has been recorded along the Eastern Pacific coastline of North America from Duxbury Reef, Marin County to Santa Catalina Island, California, United States.
