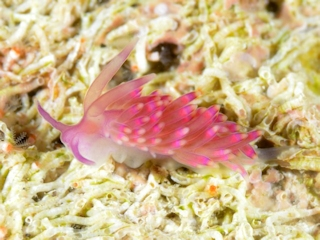
- Trinchesia beta

Scientific classification
- Kingdom: Animalia
- Phylum: Mollusca
- Class: Gastropoda
- Order: Nudibranchia
- Suborder: Aeolidacea
- Family: Trinchesiidae
- Genus: Trinchesia
- Species: T. beta

Binomial name
- Trinchesia beta (Baba & Abe, 1964)

Synonyms
- Catriona beta Baba & Abe, 1964; Cuthona beta (Baba & Abe, 1964); Tenellia beta (Baba & Abe, 1964)

= Trinchesia beta =

Species of gastropod

Trinchesia beta is a species of sea slug, an aeolid nudibranch, a marine gastropod mollusc in the family Trinchesiidae.

== Distribution ==
This species was described from the vicinity of the Noto marine laboratory, Ogi, Toyama Bay with additional specimens from Kannonzaki and Tsukumo Bay, Hosu-gun, Noto-cho, Noto Peninsula, Ishikawa Prefecture, Japan. It is also reported from Kurasaki Beach, Amami Ōshima.

== Description ==
The typical adult size of this species is 4–10 mm.
