= Phestilla poritophages =

Scientific classification
- Kingdom: Animalia
- Phylum: Mollusca
- Class: Gastropoda
- Order: Nudibranchia
- Suborder: Aeolidacea
- Family: Trinchesiidae
- Genus: Phestilla
- Species: P. poritophages

Binomial name
- Phestilla poritophages (Rudman 1979)

Synonyms
- Cuthona poritophages Rudman, 1979

Species of gastropod

Phestilla poritophages is a species of sea slug, an aeolid nudibranch, a marine gastropod mollusk in the family Trinchesiidae. The species was named after its prey genus, the hard coral Porites.

== Distribution ==
This species was described from 1 km south of Kunduchi, Tanzania.
