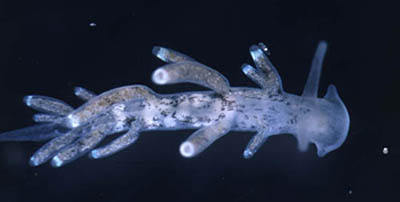
- A live individual of Tenellia adspersa, head end towards the right

Scientific classification
- Kingdom: Animalia
- Phylum: Mollusca
- Class: Gastropoda
- Order: Nudibranchia
- Suborder: Aeolidacea
- Family: Trinchesiidae
- Genus: Tenellia
- Species: T. adspersa

Binomial name
- Tenellia adspersa (Nordmann, 1845)

Synonyms
- Embletonia grayi Kent, 1869; Embletonia pallida Alder & Hancock, 1854; Eolis ventilabrum Dalyell, 1853; Eolis armoricana Hesse, 1872; Tenellia mediterranea Costa A., 1866; Tenellia pallida Alder & Hancock, 1845; Tergipes adspersus Nordmann, 1845

= Tenellia adspersa =

Species of gastropod

Tenellia adspersa, common name the miniature aeolis, is a species of very small sea slug, an aeolid nudibranch, a marine gastropod mollusc in the family Trinchesiidae. It is the type species of the genus Tenellia.

In Britain this solitary species is referred to as the lagoon sea slug.

== Description ==
The color of this nudibranch is generally pale yellow to light brown, with black speckles. The length is up to 8 mm.

== Distribution ==
The indigenous distribution of Tenellia adspersa is brackish waters in the Northeastern Atlantic Ocean, Baltic Sea, the Mediterranean Sea and the Black Sea.

This species is fully protected in the United Kingdom under the Wildlife and Countryside Act 1981 since 1992.

The species is thought to be introduced in:

- Brazil,
- The Caspian Sea,
- Large parts of the East Coast of the United States from Great Bay, New Hampshire in the north to Beaufort, South Carolina in the south,
- Large parts of the West Coast of the United States, from Coos Bay to Long Beach, California, including the San Francisco Bay.

== Ecology ==
=== Habitat ===
This small sea slug is found amongst hydroids and sometimes crawling along the substrate in coastal intertidal and shallow sublittoral zones, and is also found in estuaries. It prefers small rocks to sea grass bottoms, and occurs on man-made substrates as well. It prefers sheltered, low wave action waters.

=== Life cycle ===
Adults produce up to 100 eggs. Larvae are pelagic. They are sexually mature at 20 days old. Life span is less than one year usually.

=== Feeding habits ===
This sea slug is known to rapidly devour hydroid colonies. Tenellia adspersa is a carnivore feeding primarily on hydroids such as Cordylophora caspia.
