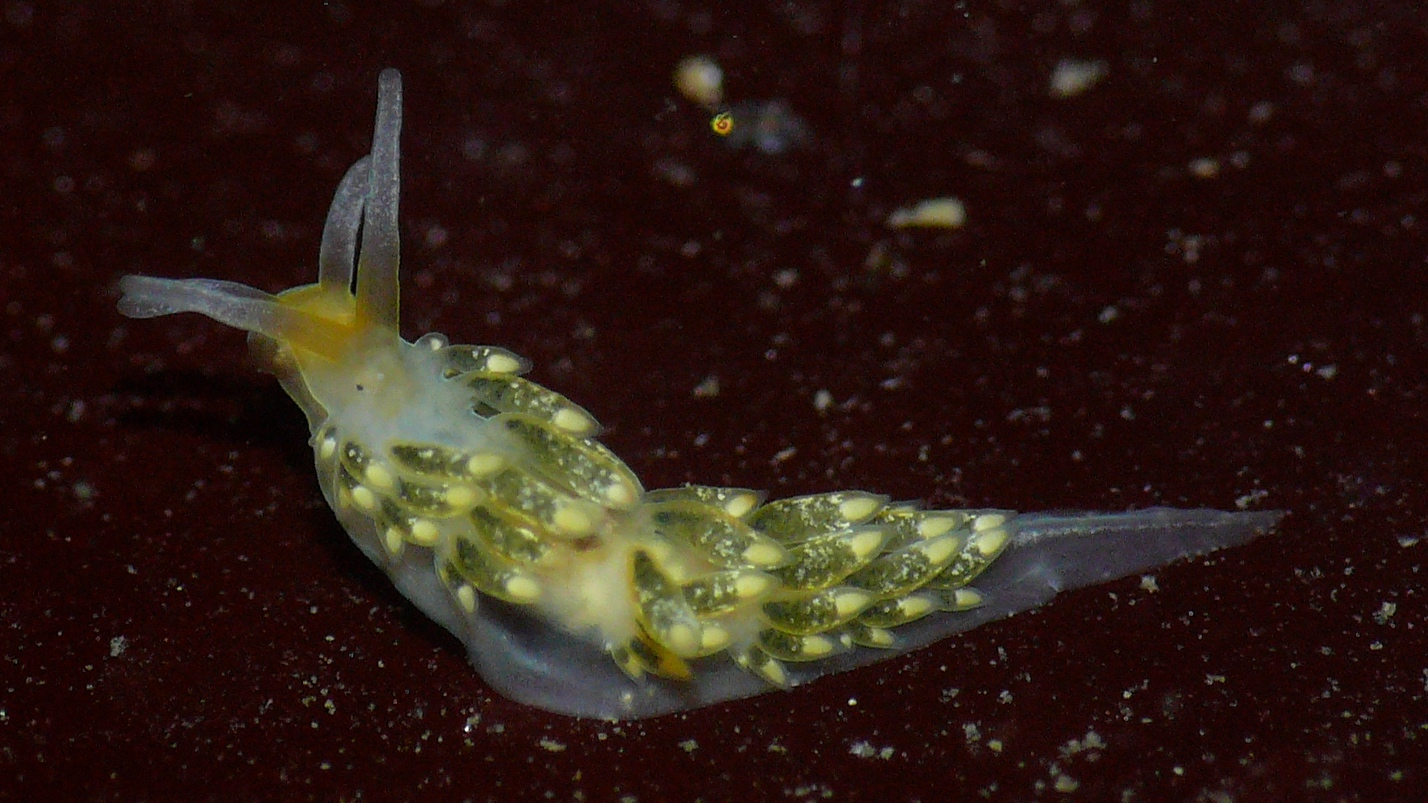
- Pillar Point, Fitzgerald Marine Reserve, Moss Beach, CA

Scientific classification
- Kingdom: Animalia
- Phylum: Mollusca
- Class: Gastropoda
- Order: Nudibranchia
- Suborder: Aeolidacea
- Family: Trinchesiidae
- Genus: Diaphoreolis
- Species: D. flavovulta

Binomial name
- Diaphoreolis flavovulta (MacFarland, 1966)

Synonyms
- Cratena flavovulta MacFarland, 1966; Cuthona flavovulta (MacFarland, 1966)

= Diaphoreolis flavovulta =

Species of gastropod

Diaphoreolis flavovulta, the yellow-head aeolid or yellow-head cuthona, is a species of sea slug, an aeolid nudibranch, a marine gastropod mollusc in the family Trinchesiidae.

== Distribution ==
This species was described from inner Monterey Bay, California, United States. Reported along the East Pacific coastline of America from Kayostia Beach, Clallam County, Washington state to Hazard Canyon, San Luis Obispo County, California.
