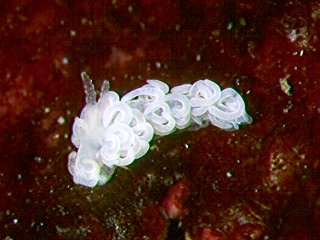
- Trinchesia anulata

Scientific classification
- Kingdom: Animalia
- Phylum: Mollusca
- Class: Gastropoda
- Order: Nudibranchia
- Suborder: Aeolidacea
- Family: Trinchesiidae
- Genus: Trinchesia
- Species: T. anulata

Binomial name
- Trinchesia anulata (Baba, 1949)

Synonyms
- Catriona anulata (Baba, 1949); Cratena anulata (Baba, 1949); Cuthona anulata (Baba, 1949); Tenellia anulata (Baba, 1949)

= Trinchesia anulata =

Species of gastropod

Trinchesia anulata is a species of sea slug, an aeolid nudibranch, a marine gastropod mollusc in the family Trinchesiidae.

== Distribution ==
This species was described from the Echizen Coast, Fukui Prefecture, north-west coast of Honshu, Japan. It has also been reported from the Izu Peninsula, Shizuoka Prefecture on the opposite coast of Honshu.
