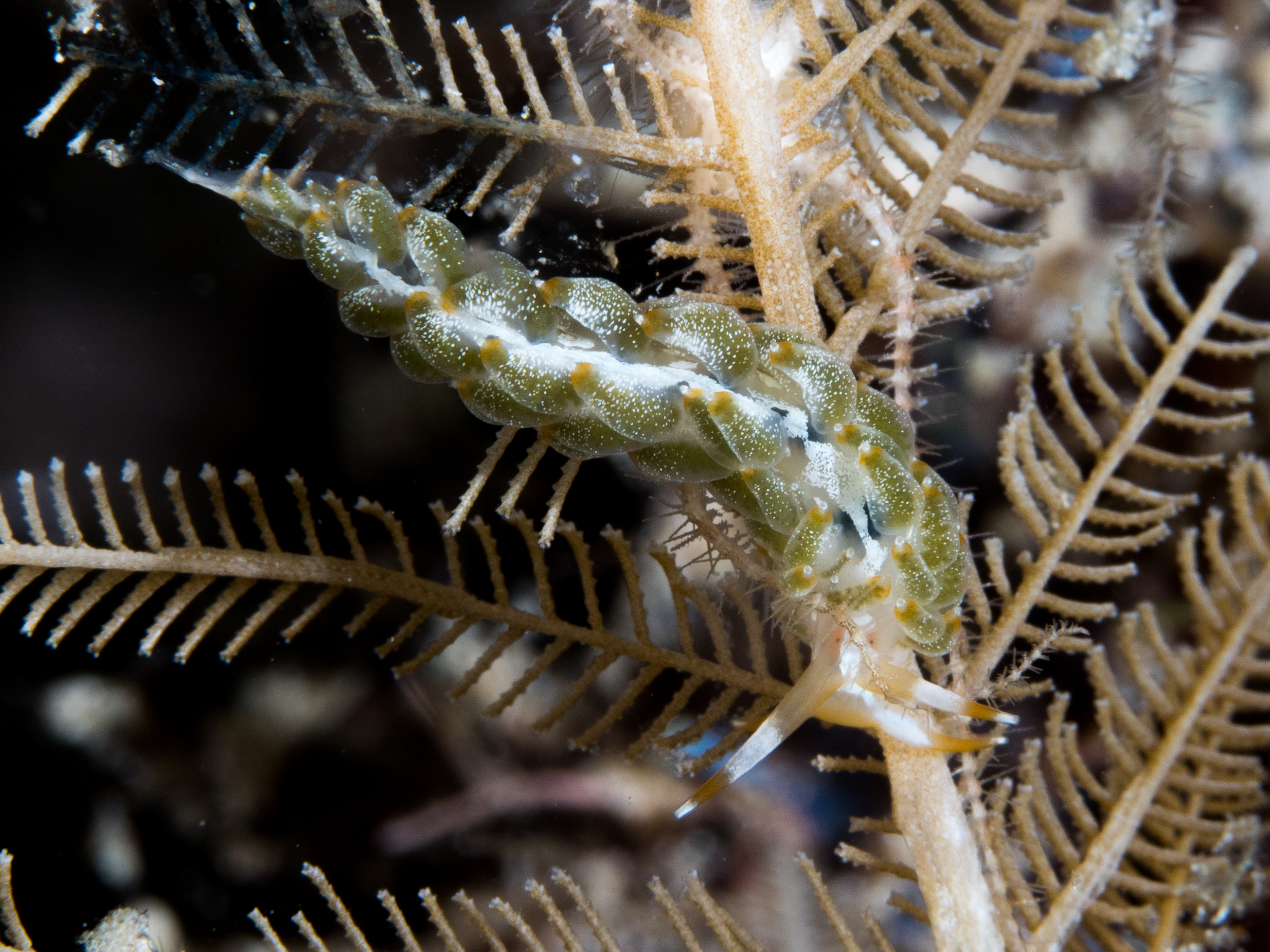

Scientific classification
- Kingdom: Animalia
- Phylum: Mollusca
- Class: Gastropoda
- Order: Nudibranchia
- Suborder: Aeolidacea
- Family: Trinchesiidae
- Genus: Trinchesia
- Species: T. yamasui

Binomial name
- Trinchesia yamasui (Hamatani, 1993)

Synonyms
- Cuthona yamasui Hamatani, 1993; Tenellia yamasui (Hamatani, 199)

= Trinchesia yamasui =

Species of gastropod

Tenellia yamasui is a species of sea slug, an aeolid nudibranch, a shell-less marine gastropod mollusk in the family Trinchesiidae.

== Distribution ==
This species was described from Okinawa, Japan. It has been reported from many places in the Indo-West Pacific region but some of these records are now known to be members of a species complex.
