= Trinchesia macquariensis =

Scientific classification
- Kingdom: Animalia
- Phylum: Mollusca
- Class: Gastropoda
- Order: Nudibranchia
- Suborder: Aeolidacea
- Family: Trinchesiidae
- Genus: Trinchesia
- Species: T. macquariensis

Binomial name
- Trinchesia macquariensis Burn, 1973

Synonyms
- Tenellia macquariensis (Burn, 1973); Cuthona macquariensis (Burn, 1973)

Species of gastropod

Trinchesia macquariensis is a species of sea slug, an aeolid nudibranch, a marine gastropod mollusc in the family Trinchesiidae.

== Distribution ==
This species was described from Buckles Bay, Macquarie Island, 54.4969°S 158.9353°E.

== Description ==
The adult size of this species is up to 5 mm in length.
