= Mukaishima =

Island in Hiroshima, Japan

Native name: 向島 Mukaishima
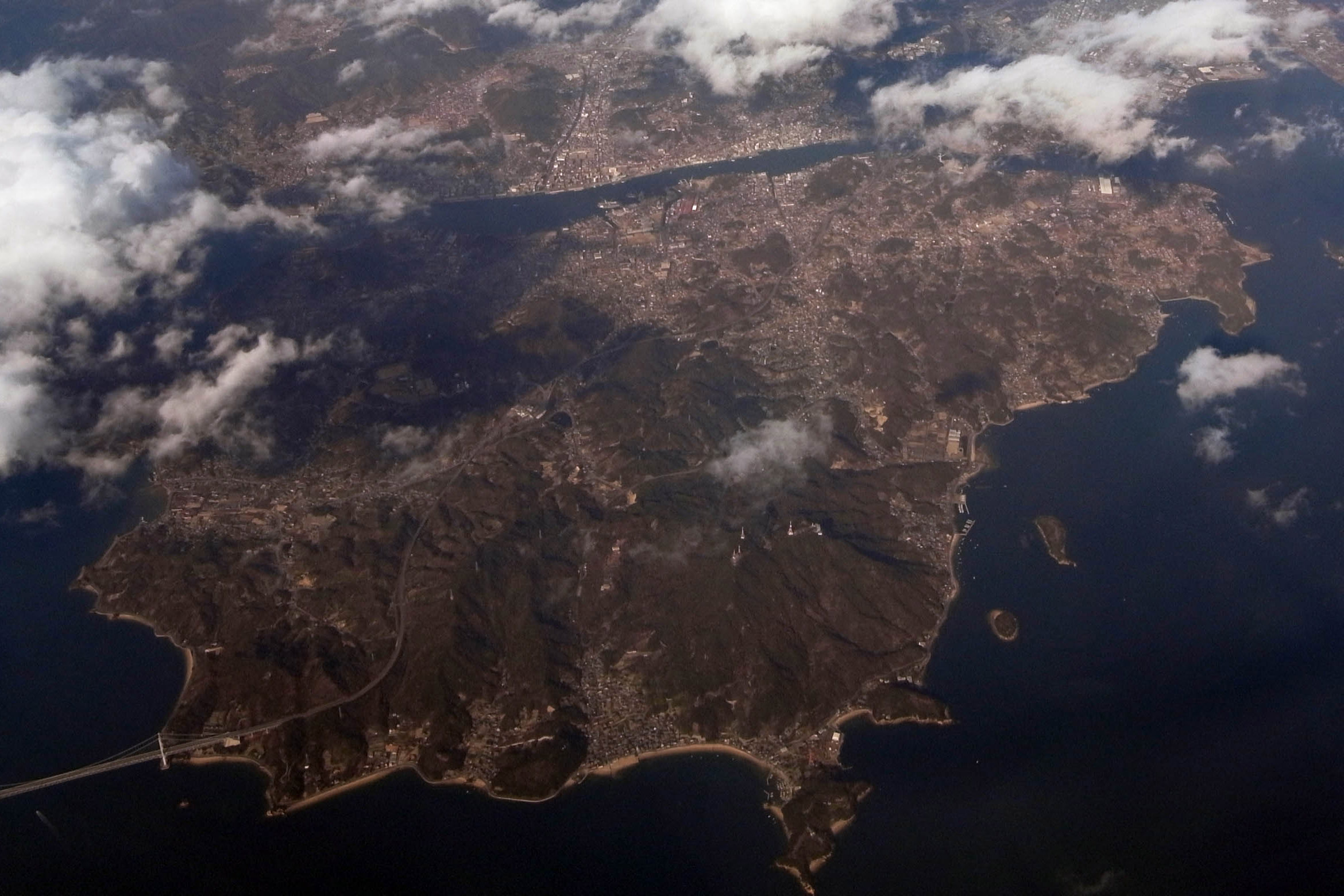
- Seen from the SSE

- Location within Japan

Geography
- Location: Seto Inland Sea
- Coordinates: 34.386088°N 133.200866°E
- Area: 23.31 km^{2} (9.00 sq mi)
- Length: 7 km (4.3 mi)
- Width: 5 km (3.1 mi)
- Highest elevation: 283.2 m (929.1 ft)
- Highest point: Takamiyama

Administration
- Japan
- Prefecture: Hiroshima
- city: Onomichi

Demographics
- Population: 25816 (1968-2003)
- Pop. density: 1,108/km^{2} (2870/sq mi)
- Ethnic groups: Japanese

Mukaishima (向島, Mukaishima) is the northernmost island in the Geiyo Islands chain accommodating Nishiseto Expressway connecting Honshu and Shikoku islands. Its coasts are washed by Seto Inland Sea. The island's highest peak is Takamiyama (高見山) 283.2 m (929 ft) high.

== Geography ==
The Mukaishima is a pear-shaped island and separated from the Honshu mainland by a 200-meter wide strait.

== History ==
- 1889 - municipalities of Mukaishimachō and Mukaihigashichō covering the entire island are established.
- 1968 - bridges connecting the island to Onomichi and Iwashi-jima are completed.
- 1983 - Innoshima bridge is completed.
- 1991 - the island becomes a filming ground for Chizuko's Younger Sister film directed by Nobuhiko Obayashi in 1991.
- 2005 - towns of the island are incorporated into Onomichi city.
- 2013 - cycling and hiking course of Mukaishima is completed.

== Transportation ==
The Mukaishima is connected to the mainland of Honshu and Innoshima islands by bridges of Nishiseto Expressway (Shimanami Kaidō). Bridge connection also exists to Iwashi-jima, and ferry is available to Fukuyama with a stopover at Momoshima, Hiroshima. The island is served by the national Route 317. The buses to Mukaishima can be taken from Hiroshima, Fukuyama or Onomichi cities.

== Economy and industry ==
The Mukaishima Island is an important shipbuilding center, with several shipyards on the north of the island producing coastal vessels. Also, Mukaishima Dockyard is the leading ship repair center in Japan, serving about 300 ships annually.

== Notable residents ==
- Satoshi Miura - manager
- Kaiji Kawaguchi - manga author
- Mariko Yoshida - wrestler

== See also ==
- Onomichi, Hiroshima
- Mukaishima, Hiroshima
