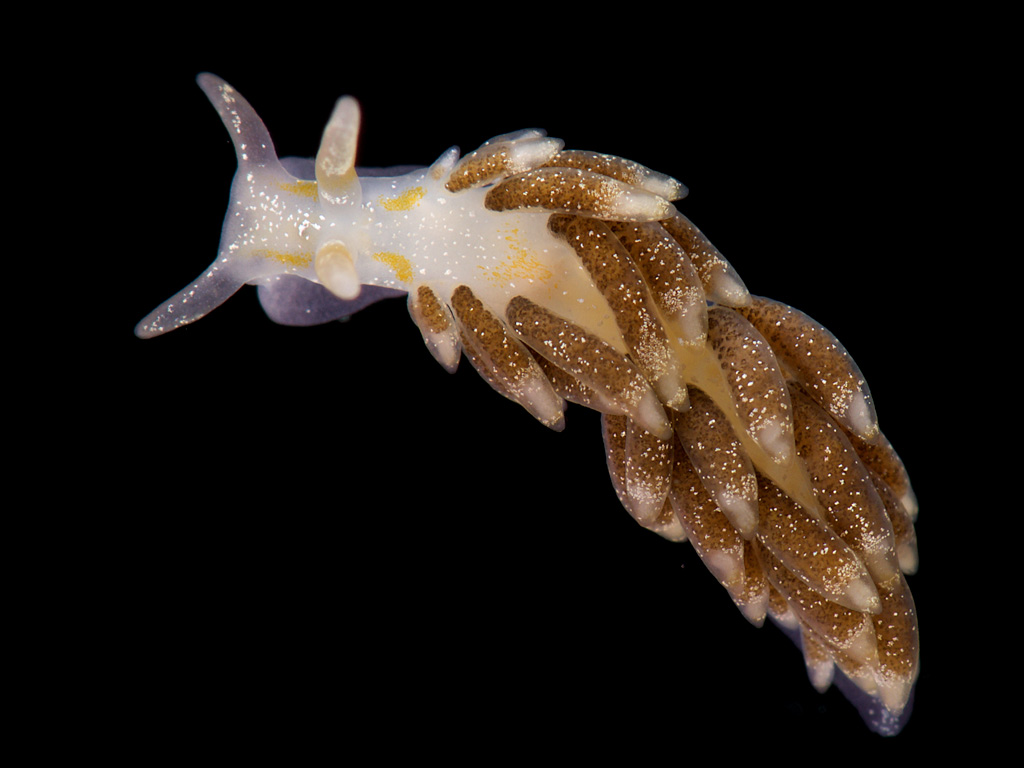
- The nudibranch Trinchesia foliata, Strangford Lough, County Down, Northern Ireland.

Scientific classification
- Kingdom: Animalia
- Phylum: Mollusca
- Class: Gastropoda
- Order: Nudibranchia
- Suborder: Aeolidacea
- Family: Trinchesiidae
- Genus: Trinchesia
- Species: T. foliata

Binomial name
- Trinchesia foliata (Forbes & Goodsir, 1839)

Synonyms
- Eolidia foliata Forbes & Goodsir, 1839; Eolis olivacea Alder & Hancock, 1842; Cuthona foliata (Alder & Hancock, 1842); Tenellia foliata (Forbes & Goodsir, 1839)

= Trinchesia foliata =

Species of gastropod

Trinchesia foliata is a species of sea slug, an aeolid nudibranch, a marine gastropod mollusk in the family Trinchesiidae.

== Distribution ==
This species was described from Orkney, Scotland. It has been reported from the NE Atlantic, from the Faeroes and Norway south to Portugal, and in the Mediterranean Sea.

== Description ==
The typical adult size of this species is 8–11 mm.

== Habitat ==
Trinchesia foliata feeds on hydroids. It has been reported from a number of hydroids including Dynamena pumila, Sertularella gayi, Sertularella polyzonias and Abietinaria abietina family Sertulariidae.
