= Toorna thelmae =

Scientific classification
- Kingdom: Animalia
- Phylum: Mollusca
- Class: Gastropoda
- Order: Nudibranchia
- Suborder: Aeolidacea
- Family: Trinchesiidae
- Genus: Toorna
- Species: T. thelmae

Binomial name
- Toorna thelmae (Burn, 1964)

Synonyms
- Cuthona thelmae (Burn, 1964); Tenellia thelmae Burn, 1964; Trinchesia thelmae (Burn, 1964)

Species of gastropod

Toorna thelmae is a species of sea slug, an aeolid nudibranch, a marine gastropod mollusc in the family Trinchesiidae.

== Distribution ==
This species was described from Australia.
