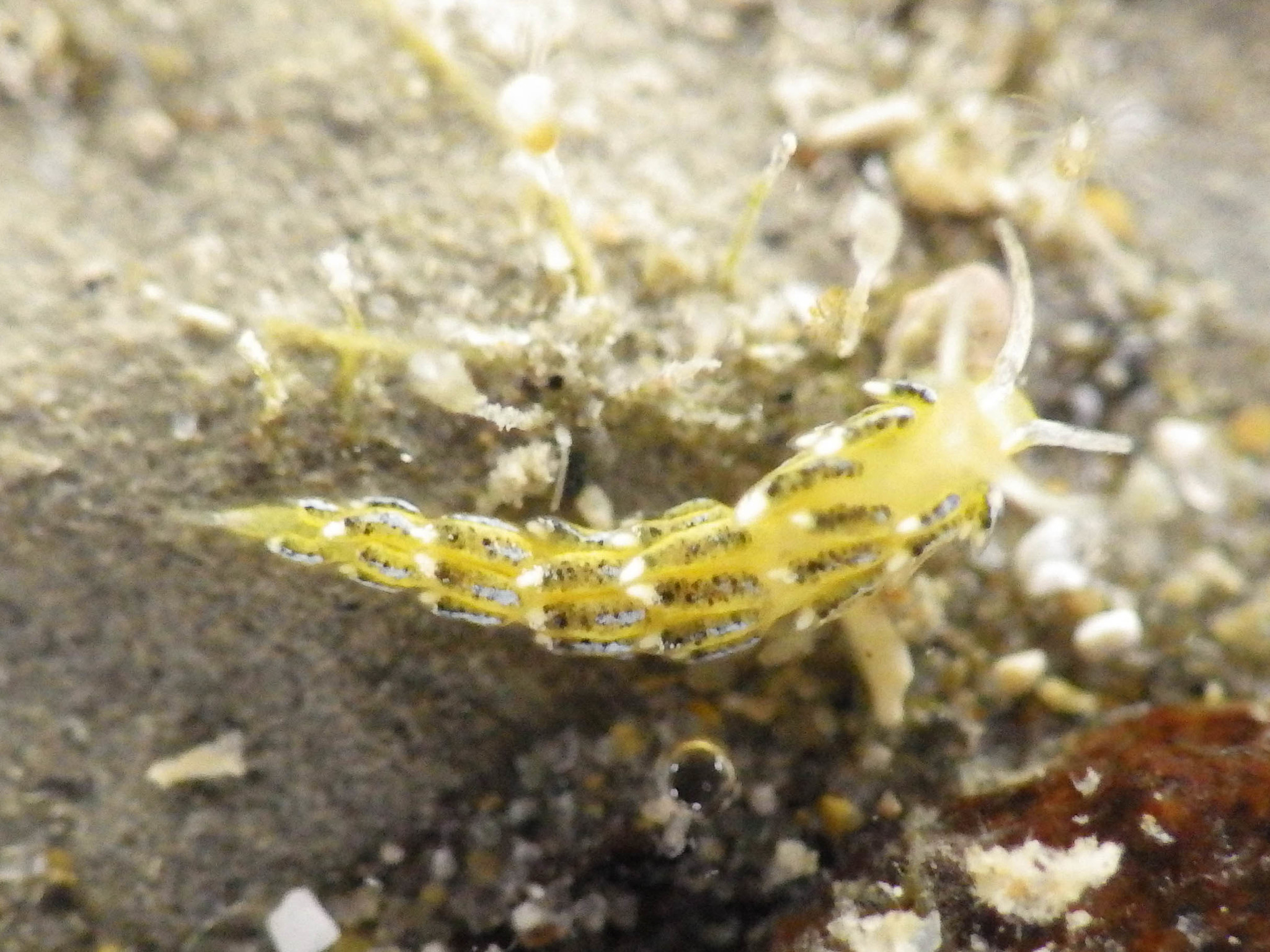

Scientific classification
- Kingdom: Animalia
- Phylum: Mollusca
- Class: Gastropoda
- Order: Nudibranchia
- Suborder: Aeolidacea
- Family: Trinchesiidae
- Genus: Diaphoreolis
- Species: D. scintillans

Binomial name
- Diaphoreolis scintillans (M. C. Miller, 1977)

Synonyms
- Cuthona scintillans Miller, 1977; Tenellia scintillans (Miller, 1977); Trinchesia scintillans (Miller, 1977)

= Diaphoreolis scintillans =

Species of gastropod

Diaphoreolis scintillans is a species of sea slug, an aeolid nudibranch, a marine gastropod mollusc in the family Trinchesiidae.

== Distribution ==
This species was described from Devonport, Auckland, New Zealand.
