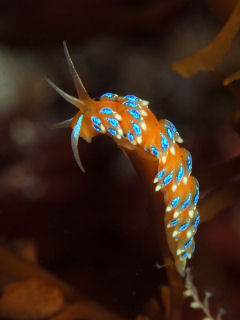
- Trinchesia ornata

Scientific classification
- Kingdom: Animalia
- Phylum: Mollusca
- Class: Gastropoda
- Order: Nudibranchia
- Suborder: Aeolidacea
- Family: Trinchesiidae
- Genus: Trinchesia
- Species: T. ornata

Binomial name
- Trinchesia ornata (Baba, 1937)

Synonyms
- Catriona ornata (Baba, 1937); Cuthona ornata Baba, 1937; Tenellia ornata (Baba, 1937)

= Trinchesia ornata =

Species of gastropod

Trinchesia ornata is a species of sea slug, an aeolid nudibranch, a marine gastropod mollusc in the family Trinchesiidae.

== Distribution ==
This species was described from Japan. It has been reported from the Echizen Coast, Fukui Prefecture, north-west coast of Honshu, Japan and Hong Kong, South Korea and Peter the Great Bay, Russia
