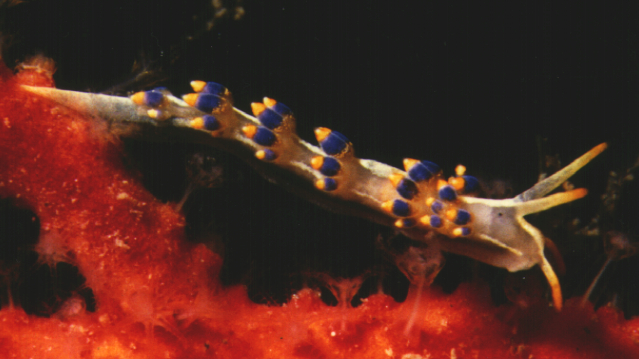
- Trinchesia caerulea, Mediterranean form

Scientific classification
- Kingdom: Animalia
- Phylum: Mollusca
- Class: Gastropoda
- Order: Nudibranchia
- Suborder: Aeolidacea
- Family: Trinchesiidae
- Genus: Trinchesia
- Species: T. caerulea

Binomial name
- Trinchesia caerulea (Montagu, 1804)

Synonyms
- Doris caerulea (Montagu, 1804); Cuthona caerulea (Montagu, 1804); Tenellia caerulea (Montagu, 1804)

= Trinchesia caerulea =

Species of gastropod

Trinchesia caerulea is a species of sea slug, an aeolid nudibranch, a marine gastropod mollusc in the family Trinchesiidae.

== Distribution ==
This species was described from Devon, England. It has been reported from the NE Atlantic from Norway south to Portugal and in the Mediterranean Sea. Records from Brazil and Florida probably represent a different species.

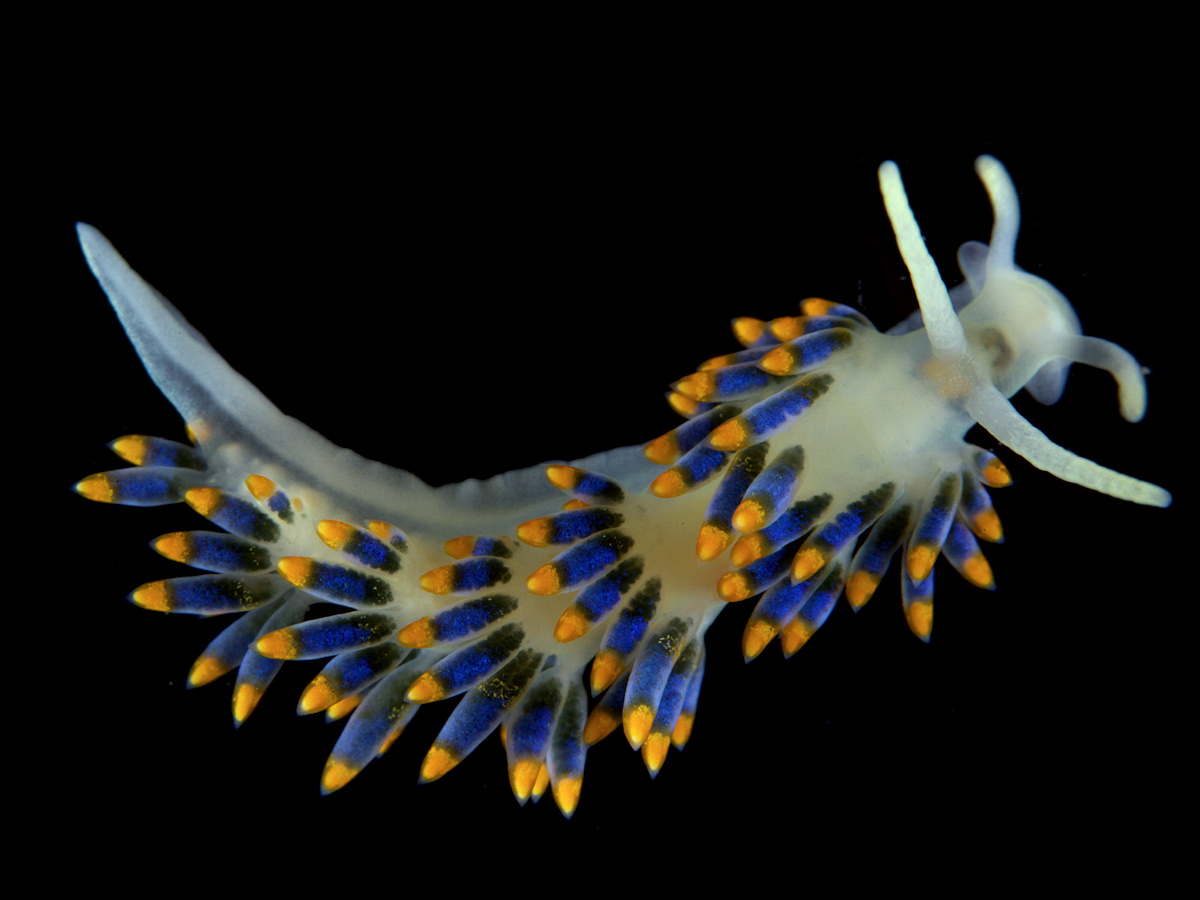
The nudibranch Trinchesia caerulea, Strangford Lough, County Down, Northern Ireland.

== Description ==
The typical size of this species is 10–15 mm and the maximum recorded length is 26 mm.

== Habitat ==
Found from the intertidal zone to 270 m. Trinchesia caerulea feeds on hydroids of the genus Sertularella.
