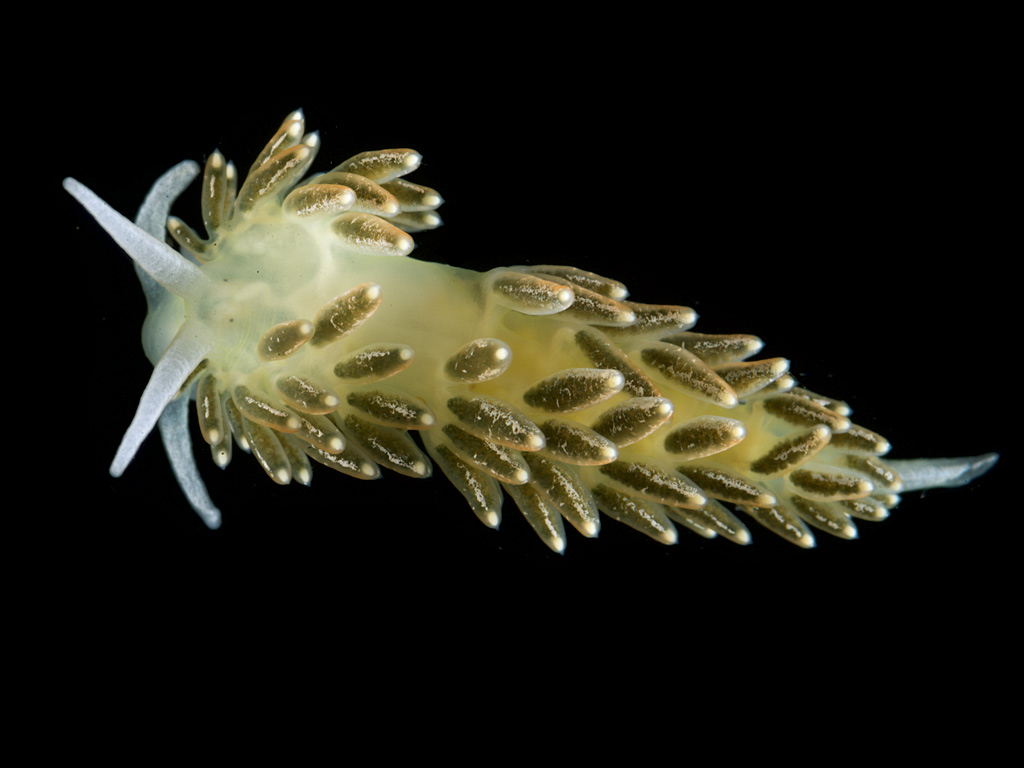
- The nudibranch Diaphoreolis viridis, Gulen Dive Resort, Norway.

Scientific classification
- Kingdom: Animalia
- Phylum: Mollusca
- Class: Gastropoda
- Order: Nudibranchia
- Suborder: Aeolidacea
- Family: Trinchesiidae
- Genus: Diaphoreolis
- Species: D. viridis

Binomial name
- Diaphoreolis viridis (Forbes, 1840)

Synonyms
- Montagua viridis Forbes, 1840; Cuthona viridis (Forbes, 1840); Trinchesia viridis (Forbes, 1840)

= Diaphoreolis viridis =

Species of gastropod

Diaphoreolis viridis is a species of sea slug, an aeolid nudibranch, a marine gastropod mollusk in the family Trinchesiidae.

== Distribution ==
This species was described from Ballaugh, Isle of Man in the Irish Sea. It has been reported in the northeast Atlantic, from Greenland and Iceland south to Roscoff, France.

== Description ==
The maximum recorded length is 19 mm.

== Ecology ==
Feeds on the hydroids Sertularella spp. especially Sertularella rugosa. Found in shallow exposed and semi-sheltered rocky areas to 100 m depth. Minimum recorded depth is 4 m. Maximum recorded depth is 10 m.
