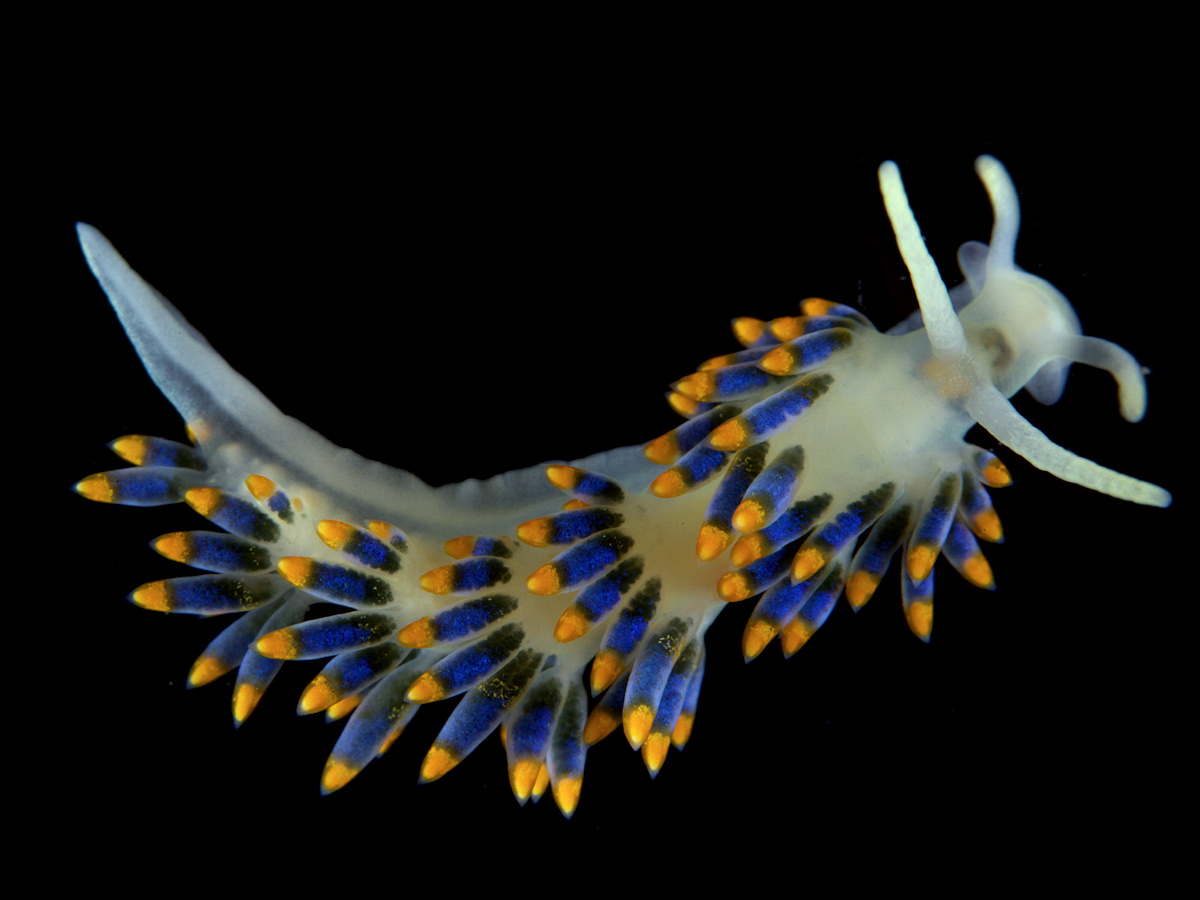
- dorsal view of Trinchesia caerulea

Scientific classification
- Kingdom: Animalia
- Phylum: Mollusca
- Class: Gastropoda
- Order: Nudibranchia
- Suborder: Aeolidacea
- Superfamily: Fionoidea
- Family: Trinchesiidae; Nordsieck, 1972

Genera
- See text

= Trinchesiidae =

Family of gastropods

Trinchesiidae is a family of sea slugs, aeolid nudibranchs, marine gastropod molluscs in the superfamily Fionoidea.

== Taxonomic history ==
This family was reinstated as a result of a molecular phylogenetics study.

In yet another study, Korshunova et al., 2025 conducted a mass reassessment of Aeolidacea taxa and proposed to reverse previous motions that "lumped" taxa together indiscriminately, in addition to reinstating many genera that those previous had decided belonged in synonymy. While The World Register of Marine Species (WoRMS) has cited Korshunova et al., 2025 across other taxonomic adjustments, in regards to the precise allocation of species and genera within Trinchesiidae, who is possibly the most controversed Aeolidean family with papers being published nearly every year from opposing camps, there has yet to be adjustments made.

== Genera ==
According to Korshunova et al. (2025), genera within the family Trinchesiidae include:

- Catriona Winckworth, 1941
- Diaphoreolis Iredale & O'Donoghue, 1923
- Narraeolida Burn, 1961
- Njurja Er. Marcus & Ev. Marcus, 1960
- Phestilla Bergh, 1874
- Pinufius Er. Marcus & Ev. Marcus, 1960
- Rubramoena* Cella, Carmona, Ekimova, Chichvarkhin, Schepetov & Gosliner, 2016
- Selva Edmunds, 1964
- Subcuthona Baba, 1949
- Tenellia A. Costa, 1866
- Toorna Burn, 1964
- Trinchesia Ihering, 1879
- Zelentia Ihering, 1879

Korshunova et al. (2025) did not include Rubramoena within Trinchesiidae, yet did not offer an alternate designation, referencing it only once with the suggestion it might be made a juniour subjunctive synonym of Tenellia or Tergipes. It will remain listed here in accordance with WoRMS until later consensis.
