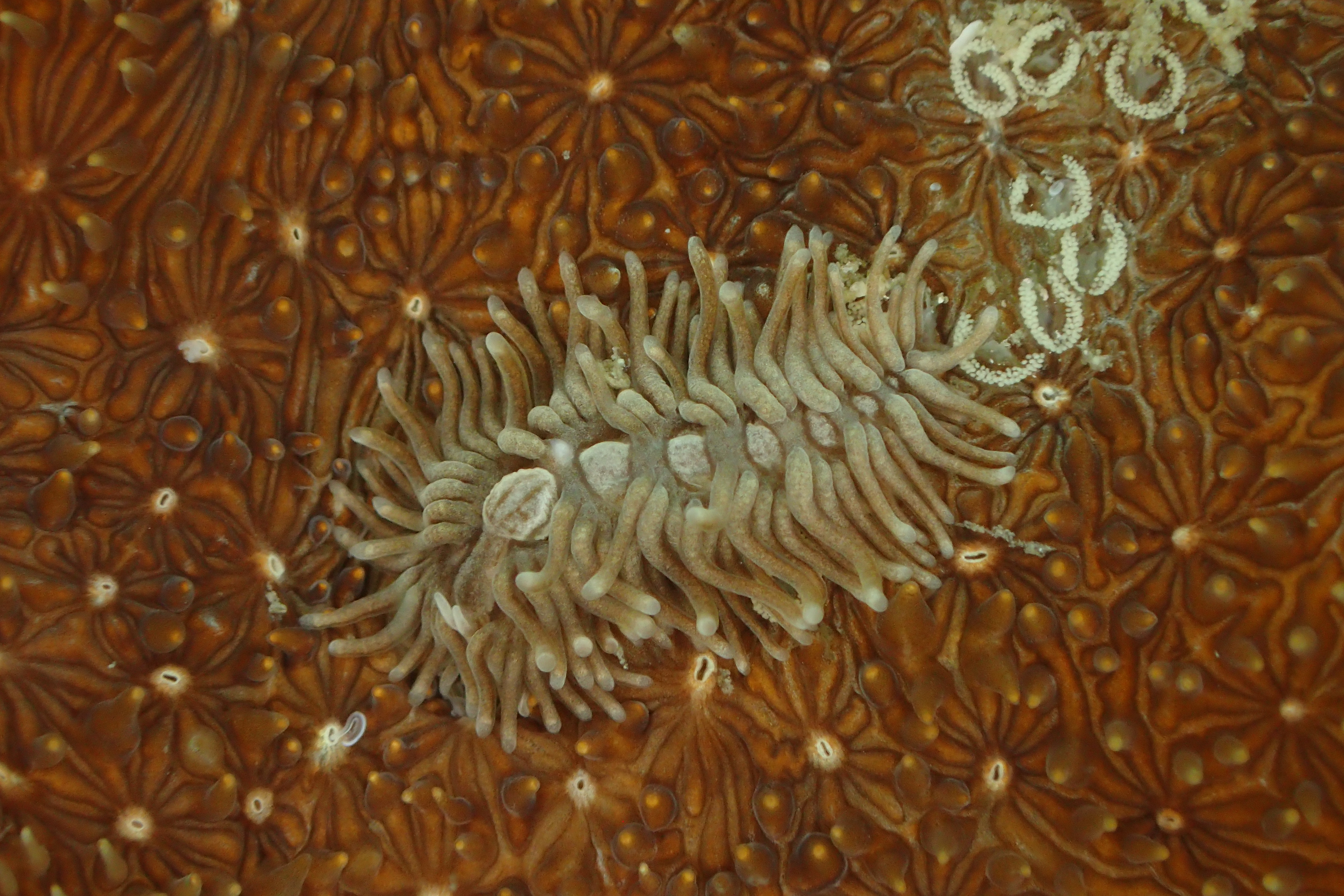
- Phestilla viei laying a distinctive linear trail of crescent-shaped egg masses on its host coral Pavona explanulata

Scientific classification
- Kingdom: Animalia
- Phylum: Mollusca
- Class: Gastropoda
- Order: Nudibranchia
- Suborder: Aeolidacea
- Family: Trinchesiidae
- Genus: Phestilla
- Species: P. viei

Binomial name
- Phestilla viei Mehrotra, Caballer & Chavanich, 2020

= Phestilla viei =

Coral-feeding sea slug

Phestilla viei is a species of coral-feeding sea slug, an aeolid nudibranch, from the family Trinchesiidae, described in 2020. It has been identified as a sister species of Phestilla fuscostriata based on DNA barcoding using the COI gene. The genus Phestilla currently includes nine recognized species, eight of which are obligate corallivores, with each particular species predating on only one species or genus of coral. Its distribution is restricted to the Indo-Pacific Ocean.

== Background ==
Nudibranchs, an order of opistobranchs or sea slugs, are a diverse group of marine gastropods known for their bright coloration and unique morphologies. Present in all oceans worldwide, they typically occur in shallow, coastal waters. True to their name, nudus meaning "naked" in Latin and βράγχια (bránkhia) meaning "gills" in Ancient Greek, this group of sea slugs is characterized by its exposed gills. Nudibranchs come in a wide variety of shapes and sizes, with lengths varying between 40 centimeters and only a few millimeters. The characteristic colorization derives from the presence of specific pigments, the chromophores. Some species possess specialized structures called cerata that are used for defense and sometimes have stinging cells (cnidocytes). Generally, nudibranchs are carnivorous and their specialized radula enables them to feed on a variety of prey, including sponges, hydrozoans, bryozoans, and various species of coral. Nudibranchs are an important part of marine ecosystems, and they can serve as bioindicators for the health of an ecosystem, as many nudibranchs are sensitive to changes in environmental parameters and pollution. The family of nudibranchs contains approximately 3,000 species and boasts a high level of biodiversity, which still continues to expand with respect to the number of species thanks to new genetic taxonomic analyses.

== Biology ==
Phestilla viei has an elongated body that is translucent white to pale yellow dorsally and pale brown laterally, measuring up to 28 mm in length. It features translucent white, smooth, and relatively short rhinophores. Its oral tentacles are translucent white with brown markings, smooth, and 1.5 times the length of its rhinophores. The corners of its foot are broad, tapering gently toward the end. This species is characterized by a pericardium with a distinctive bulbous "hump," sometimes repeated at regular intervals along the dorsum. Its cerata are translucent white with brown pigmentation, which is caused by aggregations of unicellular dinoflagellate (known colloquially as zooxanthellae), and are held laterally, giving it a very flattened appearance. The gonopore is located on the right side below the first ceratal pedunculate row. Anal papilla are situated between the first and second postcardiac ceratal rows. The jaws of this species have smooth cutting edges, featuring broad teeth that lack a central cusp, with 8–12 denticles on each side of the median area.

== Ecology ==
=== Distribution ===
Although Phestilla viei was first described as a new species in Koh Tao, Thailand, matching records of this species have been identified from the Indian and Western Pacific Oceans in Indonesia, Madagascar, Papua New Guinea, and the Philippines.

=== Habitat ===
Phestilla viei is found only in marine habitats, spending its entire life at the bottom of the ocean. These nudibranchs can be observed year-round, exclusively on their host coral Pavona explanulata in coral reef habitats. The animals are found at depths ranging from 7 to 21 meters with no indication of seasonal variation. They are most easily observed at the head of the distinctive linear trail of crescent-shaped egg masses (each mass containing 80–120 eggs) on freshly devoured coral. Their camouflage, mimicking the surface area of the Pavona corals, sets them apart from other Phestilla species. This species has been observed holding its cerata in a characteristic S-shape or at right angles, which maximizes its cryptic ability on the host coral.

=== Diet ===
These sea slugs feed exclusively on Pavona explanulata, a species of encrusting coral that commonly develops massive and sub-massive irregular domes. They acquire much of their coloration due to dense aggregations of zooxanthellae in their tissues, which are taken from their coral host, although they do not appear to use the newly acquired zooxanthellae for the purpose of photosynthesis, as several species of sacoglossan sea slugs do (a practice known as kleptoplasty). The genus Phestilla feeds on corals by secreting enzymes that dissolve the coral's exoskeleton, thus allowing them to consume the soft tissue of the coral polyp. Their specialized radula helps them scrape away the remains of the hard skeleton.

=== Reproduction ===
Like all sea slugs, Phestilla viei are hermaphrodites, meaning that they have male and female reproductive organs and can produce gametes associated with both sexes. This particular species has a penis measuring roughly 800 μm in length, which is embedded in a sheath and lacks a stylet. However, a penile gland or penile bulb is absent. The female gland mass measures around 2 millimeters in length and is attached to the ampulla, which in turn is connected to the oviducts. The oviducts terminate in the vagina. During spawning, eggs are laid in coiled, translucent ribbons containing around 80 to 120 eggs each.
