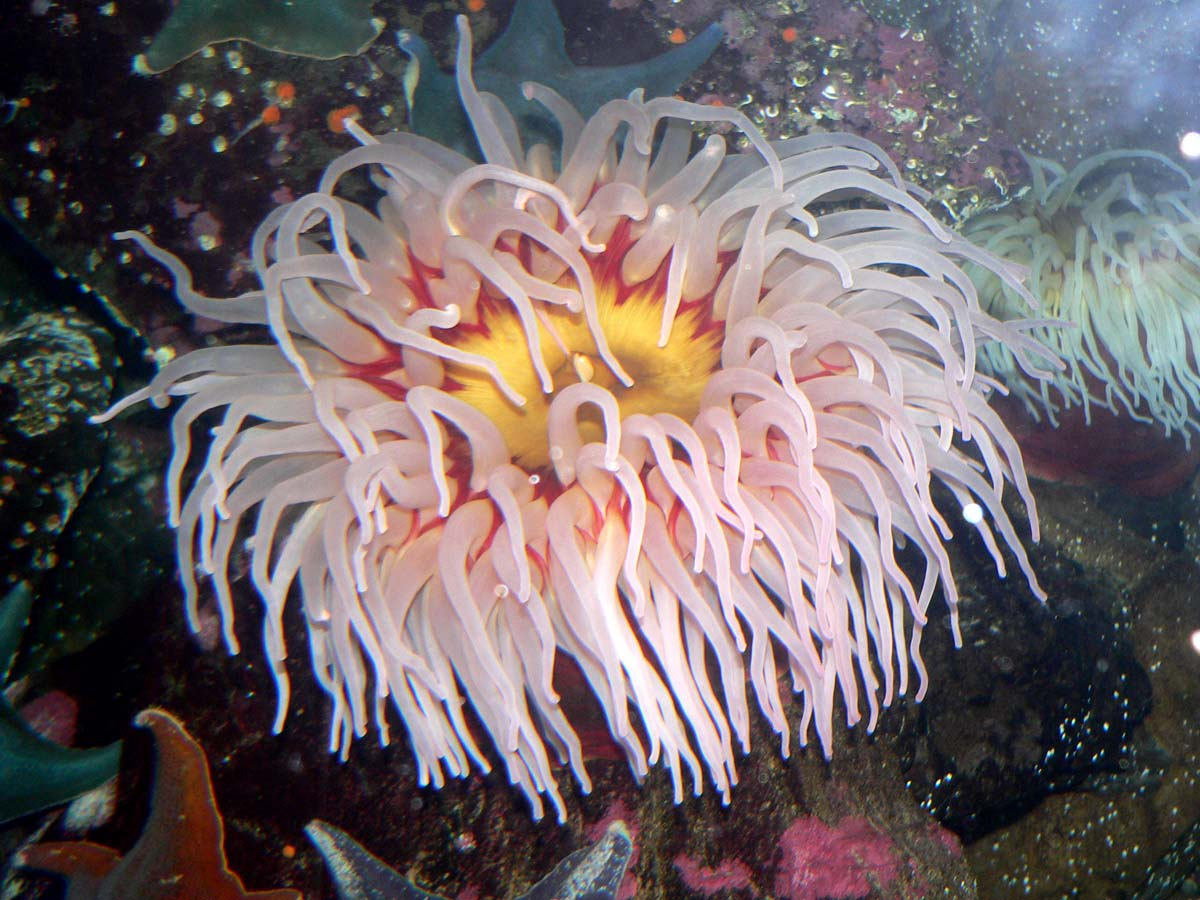
- Urticina piscivora at the Vancouver Aquarium

Scientific classification
- Kingdom: Animalia
- Phylum: Cnidaria
- Subphylum: Anthozoa
- Class: Hexacorallia
- Order: Actiniaria
- Family: Actiniidae
- Genus: Urticina
- Species: U. piscivora

Binomial name
- Urticina piscivora (Sebens & Laakso, 1978)

Synonyms
- Tealia piscivora Sebens & Laakso, 1978

= Urticina piscivora =

Species of sea anemone

Urticina piscivora, common names fish-eating anemone and fish-eating urticina, is a northeast Pacific species of sea anemone in the family Actiniidae.

== Description ==
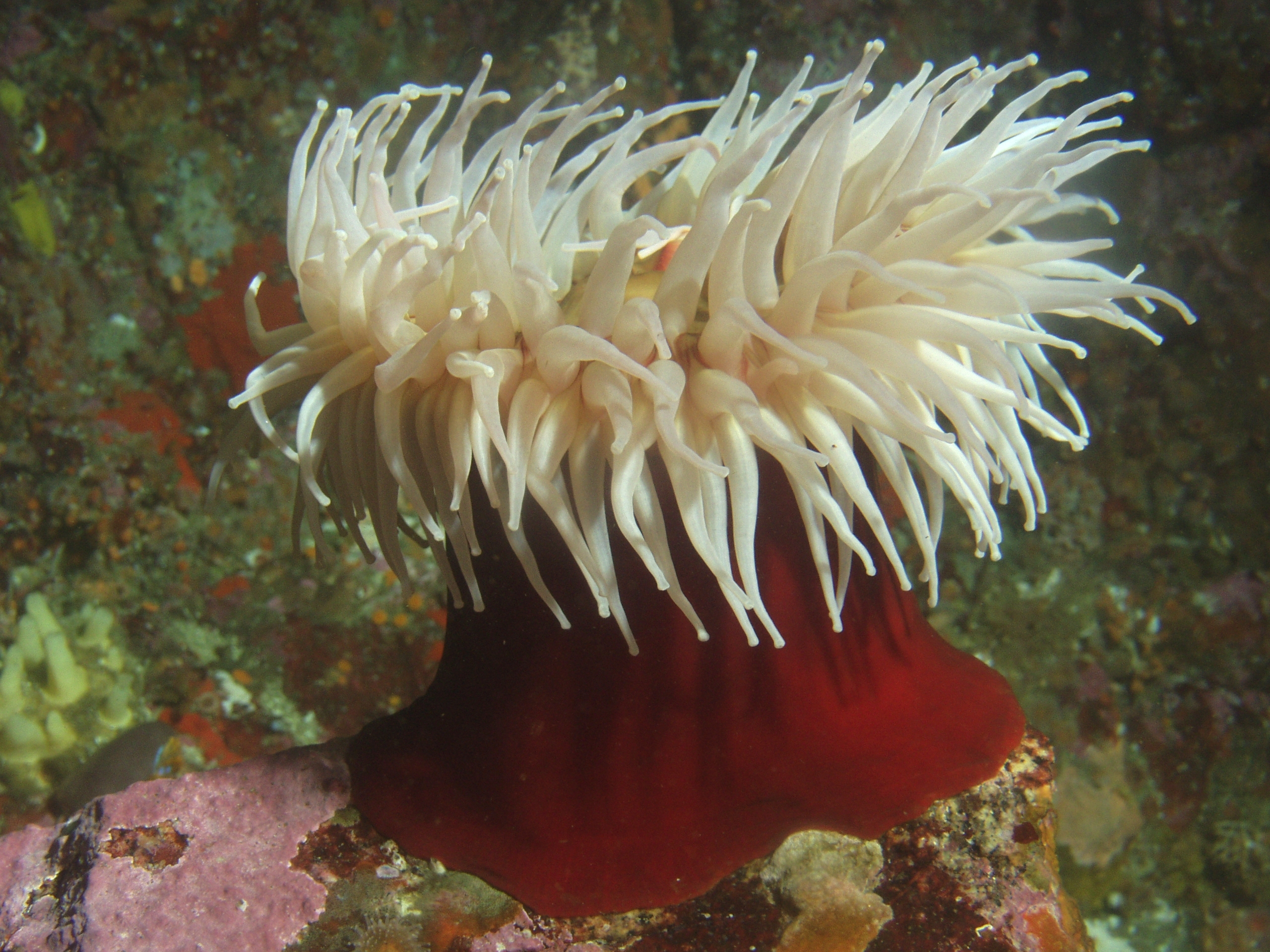
Urticina piscivora at 31 m (102 ft) depth in Cordell Bank National Marine Sanctuary, California

Urticina piscivora is a large anemone, growing to a maximum height of around 20 cm (8 in) and 10 cm (4 in) in diameter. The column is bright red in colour. The acontia is absent, but it has tubercles. These are not white and are arranged in circumferential rows. Normally they do not accumulate debris such as shells and sand.

This anemone is made up of three layers of cells called the epidermis, the mesoglea and the gastrodermis. The epidermis forms the outermost layer, while the mesoglea is situated between the other two layers. The innermost layer, the gastrodermis also referred to as the gastrovascular cavity functions as the gut of the anemone. The gut of the fish-eating anemone is divided into compartments by sheets of tissue called “septa”. These sheets of tissue develop into tentacles on the surface of the anemone. The tentacles of many species of anemones are found in multiples of six. Unlike other anemone the fish-eating anemone does not possess an acontia, which is thread-like tissue made up of stinging cells that function as a defense mechanism to protect against predators. However this particular anemone does possess tubercles.

This species may be confused with Urticina crassicornis. Although they may both have a red column, the tentacles of U. crassicornis normally have transverse bands, and olive green blotches are commonly found on the column.

== Distribution ==
This species occurs from Alaska in the north, down to La Jolla, California in the south.

== Habitat ==
Even though it can be found in intertidal zones as well it most commonly inhabits exposed, rocky Subtidal areas of outer coastlines. It attaches itself to rocky prominences in locations with a substantial current flowing past.

== Reproduction ==
Many species of anemone are monoecious, meaning that each individual organism contains both the male and female reproductive organs of the species. The fish eating anemone on the other hand is dioecious, meaning that it has distinct male and female individual organisms. They reproduce sexually through the external fertilization of egg and sperm. The produced larvae will float in the current until it eventually lands. Afterwards the larvae will attach itself to the bottom develop a pedal disk which will grow to form an anemone.

== Diet and behavior ==
As its name suggests, this species is capable of capturing and consuming small fishes and shrimp. It does so through the use of its tentacles, stinging its prey with a potent toxin containing Upl protein which paralyzes them. However, Oxylebius pictus (the painted greenling) and Lebbeus grandimanus (candy stripe shrimp) have the ability to remain among the tentacles without being harmed. Their sting can also be severely painful for humans.

Unlike other sea anemone which are mostly sessile, Urticina piscivora has the ability to detach quickly and reposition itself when it feels threatened by a predatory starfish. Since this anemone is unable to actively swim once detached it is deposited elsewhere by the currents.
