= Dendrocoryne =

Dendrocoryne may refer to:

- Dendrocoryne, a synonym for a genus of orchids, Dendrobium
- Dendrocoryne, a synonym for a genus of hydrozoans, Solanderia
