= Hermosita sangria =

Scientific classification
- Kingdom: Animalia
- Phylum: Mollusca
- Class: Gastropoda
- Order: Nudibranchia
- Suborder: Aeolidacea
- Family: Facelinidae
- Genus: Hermosita
- Species: H. sangria

Binomial name
- Hermosita sangria Gosliner & Behrens, 1986

Species of gastropod

Hermosita sangria is a brightly coloured species of sea slug, specifically an aeolid nudibranch. It is a marine gastropod mollusc in the family Facelinidae.

== Distribution ==
The holotype of this species was found at 17 m depth at Isla San Benito Oueste, 28°20′N 116°10′W on the Pacific Ocean coast of Baja California, Mexico. Additional specimens used in the original description were from nearby Isla Cedros and Bahia Magdelana, Pacific Ocean, Mexico. It has also been reported from Costa Rica.

== Biology ==
Hermosita sangria feeds on the hydroid Solanderia.
