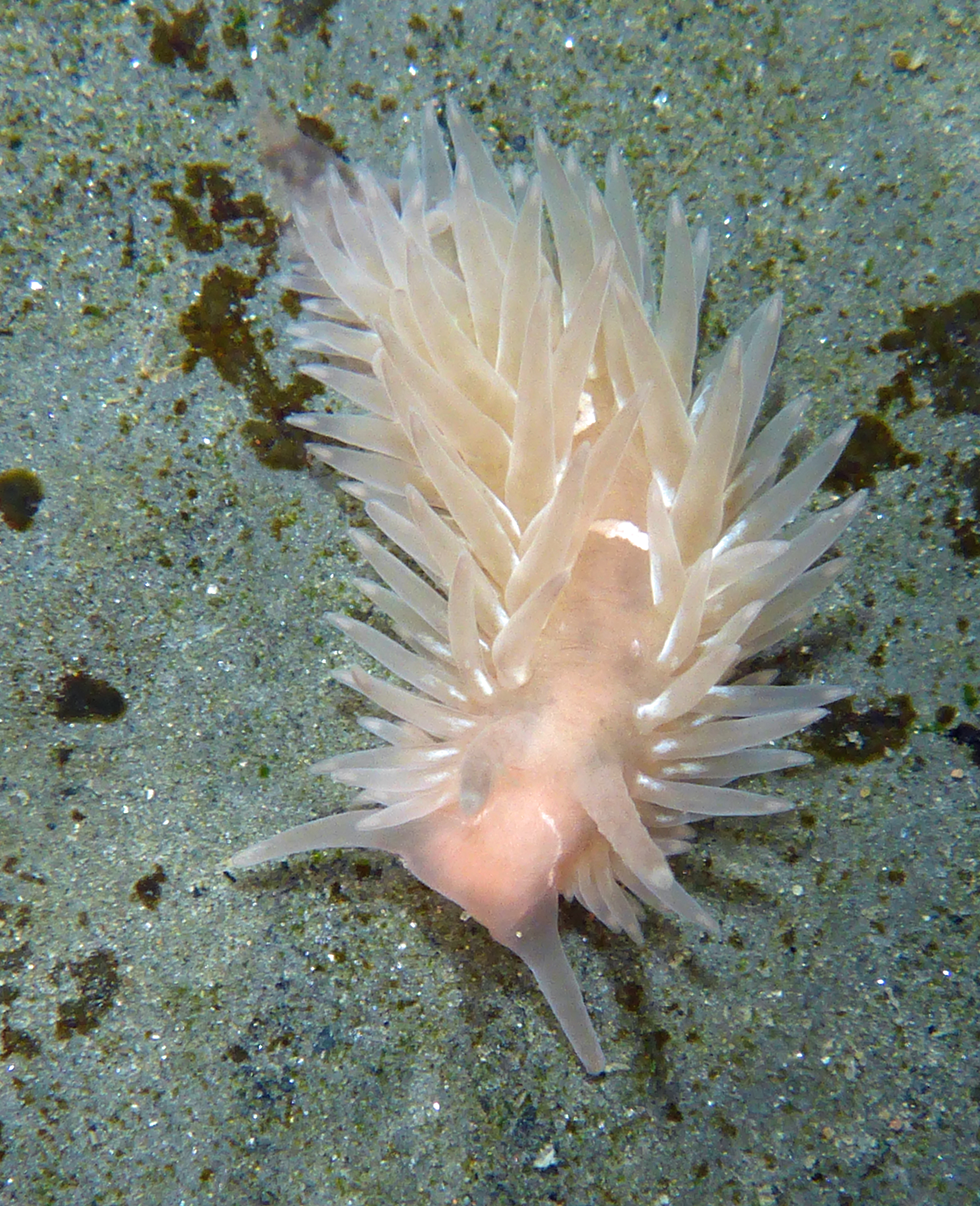
- Aeolidia loui from Pillar Point, California

Scientific classification
- Kingdom: Animalia
- Phylum: Mollusca
- Class: Gastropoda
- Order: Nudibranchia
- Suborder: Aeolidacea
- Family: Aeolidiidae
- Genus: Aeolidia
- Species: A. loui

Binomial name
- Aeolidia loui Kienberger, Carmona, Pola, Padula, Gosliner, and Cervera, 2016

= Aeolidia loui =

Species of gastropod

Aeolidia loui is a species of sea slugs, an aeolid nudibranch, a marine gastropod mollusc in the family Aeolidiidae. It has been regarded as the same species as the NE Atlantic Aeolidia papillosa but is now known to be a distinct species. Common names include shaggy mouse nudibranch, and shag-rug nudibranch.

== Distribution ==
This nudibranch species was described from the intertidal region at Duxbury Reef, Marin County, California. It is known from Cape Arago, Oregon, to San Diego, California, on the Pacific coast of North America.

== Description ==
Aeolidia loui can be easily identified by its large number of flattened cerata on its body except for a triangular area that extends from the rhinophores to the mid dorsum. The cerata vary in color from grey to white and sometimes pink, orange, or green hues, depending on the species of anemone it has been feeding on. The rhinophores are warty in living animals.

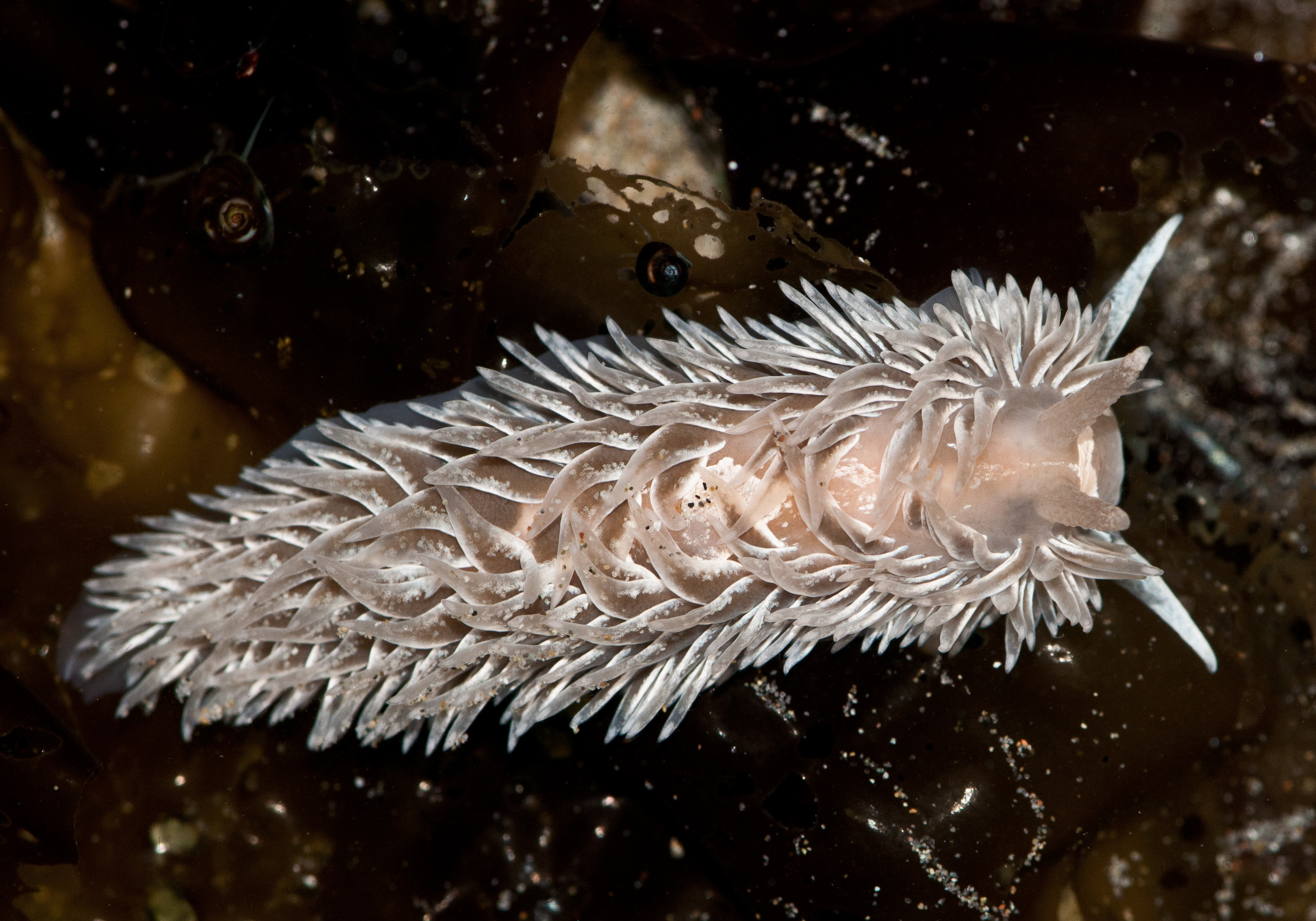
Aeolidia loui (Shag-Rug Nudibranch)

== Ecology ==
=== Feeding habits ===
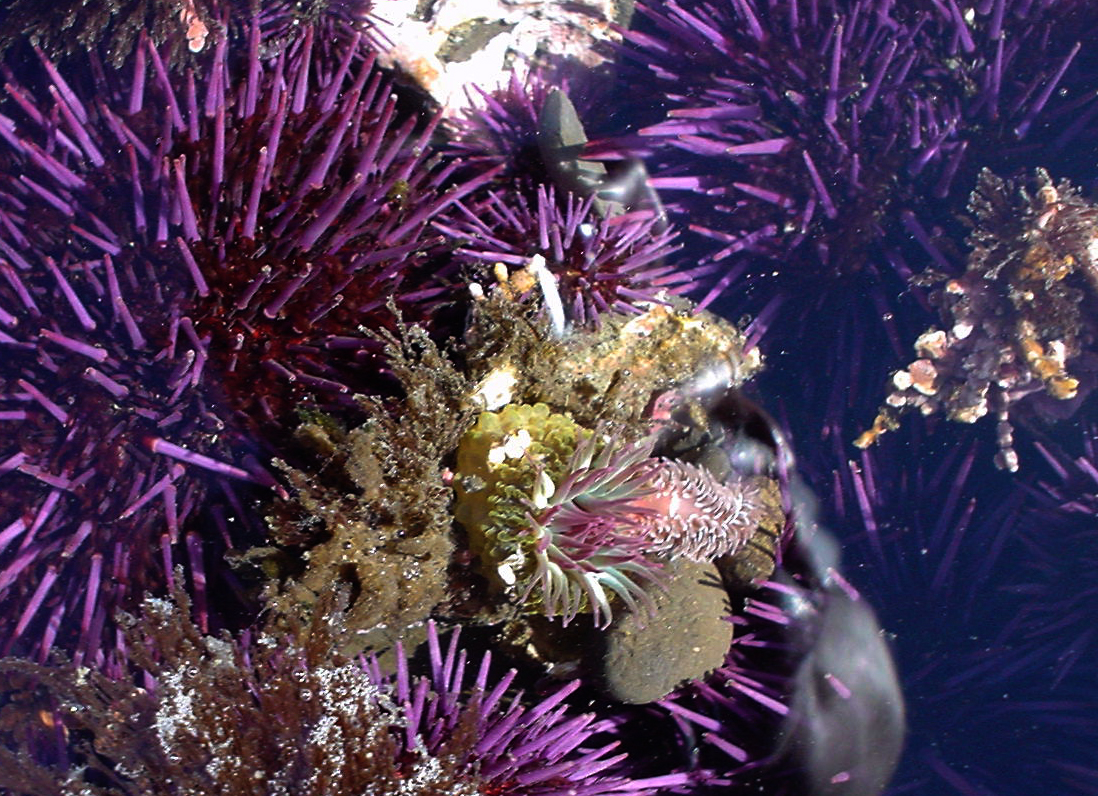
Aeolidia loui in a tide pool in Central California, starting to eat a sea anemone (in the lower center of the image). The nudibranch is behind the anemone, and they are both surrounded by purple sea urchins Strongylocentrotus purpuratus.

Aeolidia loui feeds almost entirely on various species of anemones. However, due to limited mobility of nudibranchs and often highly concentrated distribution of prey, individual nudibranchs may concentrate on an individual species of prey during their lifetime. These nudibranchs feed mostly feed on the tentacles of the sea anemone.

=== Protozoan symbiosis ===
Aeolidia loui has been shown to harbor the symbiotic organisms of sea anemones, which may increase nutrient production. Zooxanthellae and zoochlorellae are endosymbiotic organisms found in many sea animals that fix carbon through the process of photosynthesis while contributing greatly to their host's growth. Research has shown that these symbionts continue to perform high levels of photosynthesis and remain in Aeolidia loui’s cerata for as much as eleven days, translocating a significant amount of fixed carbon to the nudibranch's bodily tissues.

=== Chemical manipulation of prey ===
A unique phenomenon displayed by Aeolidia loui has been studied, revealing an ability to prevent the species of anemone being preyed upon from discharging its nematocysts. A. loui appears to have the ability to adapt to the species of anemone currently being consumed. Though the mechanism is not yet fully understood, the chemical composition of the nudibranch's mucus changes, and does not trigger a discharge of nematocysts in the sea anemone. This effect can even be true for two different species of anemone if the nudibranch has been feeding on both species within a short time period. However, eventually this ability wears off if the nudibranch changes its dietary source for too long.
