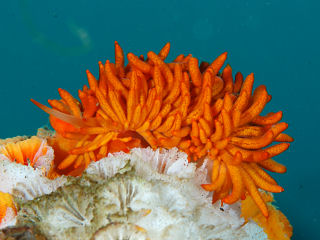
- An orange individual of Phestilla melanobrachia

Scientific classification
- Kingdom: Animalia
- Phylum: Mollusca
- Class: Gastropoda
- Order: Nudibranchia
- Suborder: Aeolidacea
- Superfamily: Fionoidea
- Family: Trinchesiidae
- Genus: Phestilla; Bergh, 1874

= Phestilla =

Genus of gastropods

Phestilla is a genus of sea slugs, aeolid nudibranchs, marine gastropod molluscs in the family Trinchesiidae.

Its members are unusual in feeding on hard corals, unlike other members of the family Trinchesiidae which feed on hydroids. Adult Phestilla have no cnidosacs. This genus has been investigated using DNA phylogeny and undescribed species exist.

== Species ==
Species within the genus Phestilla include:

- Phestilla arnoldi Mehrotra & Caballer, 2024
- Phestilla chaetopterana Ekimova, Deart & Schepetov, 2017
- Phestilla fuscostriata Hu, Zhang, Xie & Qiu, 2020
- Phestilla goniophaga Hu, Zhang, Yiu, Xie & Qui, 2020
- Phestilla lugubris Bergh, 1870
- Phestilla melanobrachia Bergh, 1874
- Phestilla minor Rudman, 1981
- Phestilla panamica Rudman, 1982
- Phestilla poritophages Rudman, 1979
- Phestilla sibogae Bergh, 1905
- Phestilla subodiosa A. Wang, Conti-Jerpe, J. L. Richards & D. M. Baker, 2020
- Phestilla viei Mehrotra, Caballer & Chavanich in Mehrotra, Arnold, Wang, Chavanich, Hoeksema & Caballer, 2020

Species names currently considered to be synonyms:

- Phestilla hakunamatata Ortea, Caballer & Espinosa, 2003: synonym of Hermosita hakunamatata
- Phestilla subodiosus A. Wang, Conti-Jerpe, J. L. Richards & D. M. Baker, 2020 : synonym of Phestilla subodiosa (incorrect gender agreement of specific epithet)
