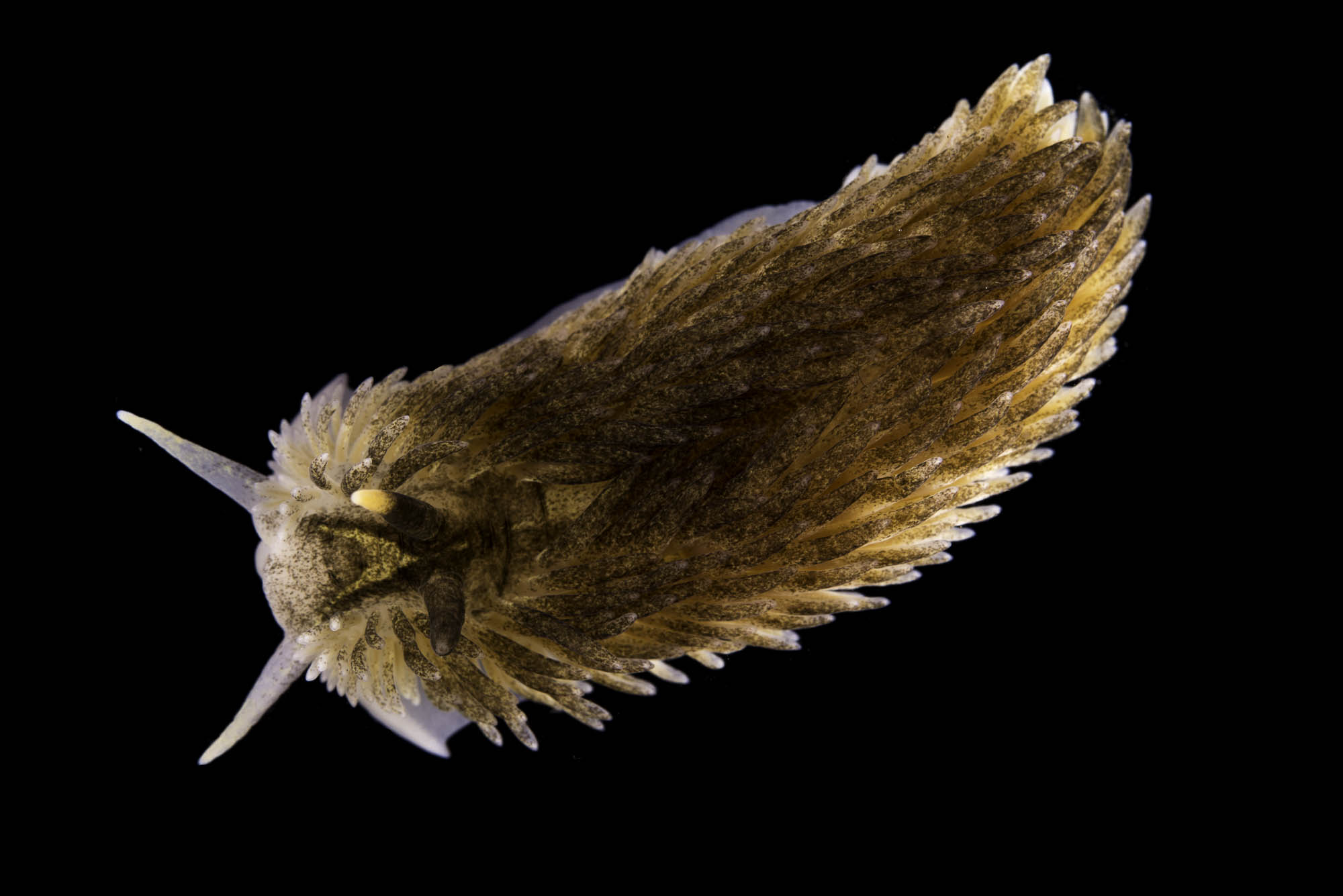
- The nudibranch Aeolidia filomenae, Corranroo Bay, Co Clare, Ireland.

Scientific classification
- Kingdom: Animalia
- Phylum: Mollusca
- Class: Gastropoda
- Order: Nudibranchia
- Suborder: Aeolidacea
- Family: Aeolidiidae
- Genus: Aeolidia
- Species: A. filomenae

Binomial name
- Aeolidia filomenae Kienberger, Carmona, Pola, Padula, Gosliner & Cervera, 2016

= Aeolidia filomenae =

Species of gastropod

Aeolidia filomenae is a species of sea slugs, an aeolid nudibranch, a marine gastropod mollusc in the family Aeolidiidae. Previously confused with Aeolidia papillosa, this species occurs on coasts of the NE Atlantic Ocean from Scotland south to Portugal.

== Distribution ==
This nudibranch species lives on the Atlantic coast of The British Isles and Europe.

== Description ==
Aeolidia filomenae can be identified by its large number of slightly flattened, hooked cerata on its body except for a triangular area that extends from the rhinophores to the mid dorsum. There is frequently a white Y-shaped mark on the head, which can be hard to see in pale individuals.
