= Jason mirabilis =

- Jason mirabilis, New Zealand

Scientific classification
- Kingdom: Animalia
- Phylum: Mollusca
- Class: Gastropoda
- Order: Nudibranchia
- Suborder: Aeolidacea
- Family: Facelinidae
- Genus: Jason
- Species: J. mirabilis

Binomial name
- Jason mirabilis M. C. Miller, 1974

Species of gastropod

Jason mirabilis is a species of sea slug, or more precisely an aeolid nudibranch, a marine gastropod mollusc in the family Facelinidae. It is the sole species of the genus Jason.

== Taxonomy ==
Very developed lamellated rhinophores, simple oral glands, internal penile glands, and radular teeth with a large cusp are what give Jason its Facelinid status. The arrangement of its cerata is similar to Dondice, placed in lateral rows on low arch-shaped elevations.

Jason mirabilis necessitated its own genus as it is a highly unique nudibranch; diagnostics of the monospecific genus include vestigial radula, a chitin-lined buccal cavity, and a tongue-like ejection on the cavity floor. Such heavy modifications to the radular processes are extremely uncommon, and these particular characteristics have never been observed elsewhere. Jason mirabilis appears to be the only aeolid nudibranch with fully vestigial radula.

The rhinophores are lamellate which is common among Facelinids, but the lamellae of Jason rhinophores have many subdivisions, giving it an almost densely feathery or wrinkled appearance, yet another trait unobserved in other nudibranchs.

== Description ==
Jason mirabilis has a high and heavily built body, with the foot is only slightly larger than the body. The foot corners are wide and rather long, tentaculiforme. Tail tip is rounded, and the oral tentacles are rather thick and taper to rounded tip as well. The rhinophores, widest about the middle and rounded at the tip, are lamellated with subdivisions of tightly-packed lobes of different sizes that give a unique, finely wrinkled appearance. The cerata are attached to slightly elevated arched peduncles, clustered in lateral rows on either side of the body. There may be up to 13 clusters and up to 29 cerata in a cluster.

The colouration is a beautiful pink or mallow, slightly translucent. This colouration applies to the body, the ceratal peduncles, the foot corners, and extendeding somewhat onto the oral tentacles. The rhinophoral club, oral tentacles, foot margin, the cerata, and occasionally a bit of the foot corners are densely covered in a distinct fawnish white pigment.

== Diet ==
Jason mirabilis feeds solely upon Solanderia sp., the hydroids that serve as its hosts. The branched polyps will be consumed, and eggs laid upon the branches after mating events.

== Distribution ==
Jason mirabilis is endemic to New Zealand, and can be found on both east and west coasts.

== Gallery ==
A Solanderia sp. colony full of Jason

Jason laying eggs

The egg ribbon of Jason

The handsome Jason mirabilis

An adult Jason and several juvenile Jason

A good view of the unique rhinophores of Jason

A Jason on a stroll past a Notoclinops segmentatus

The beautiful Jason mirabilis

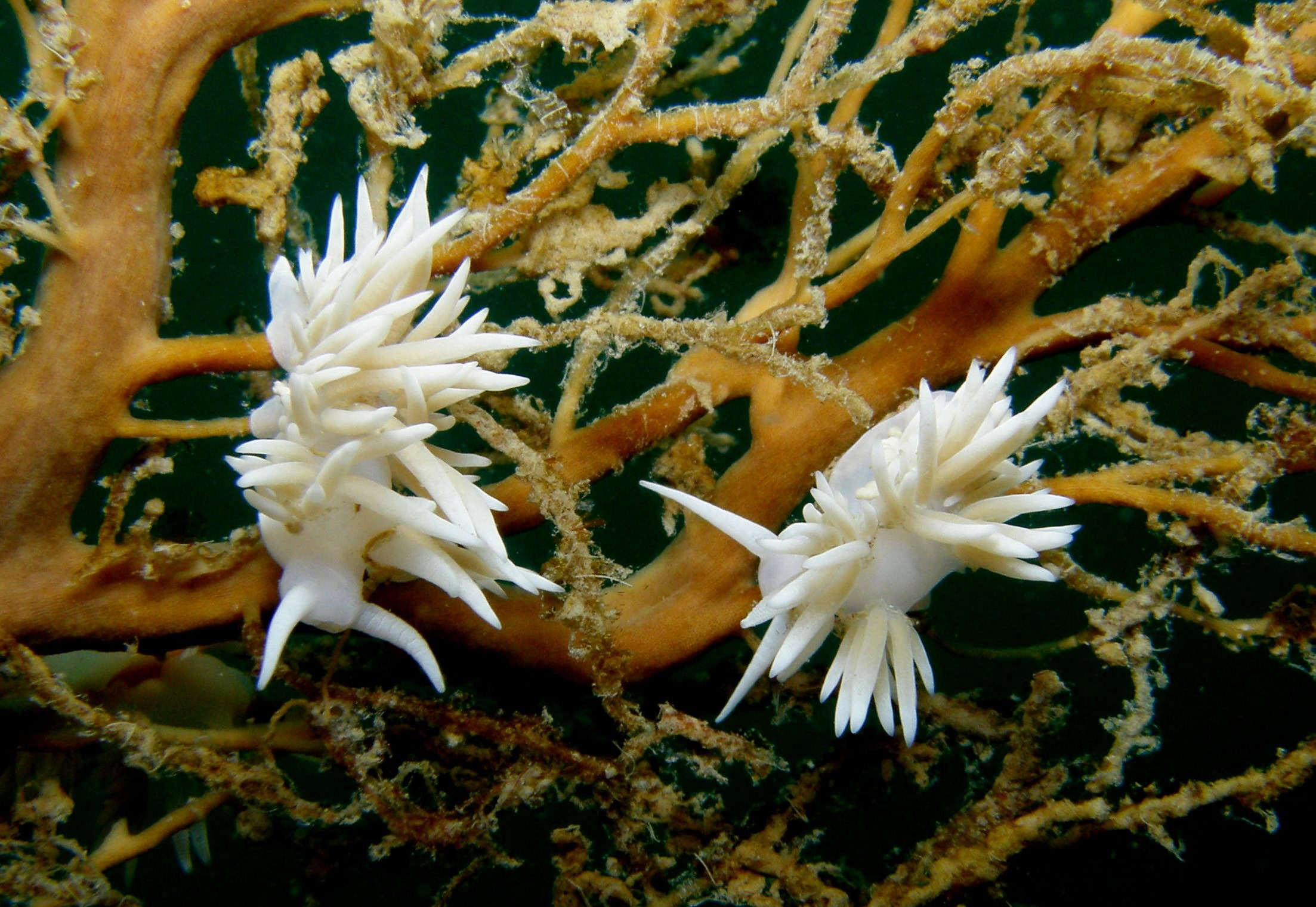
A unusual occurrence of pure white Jason mirabilis, upon a Solanderia sp. colony

Jason feasts upon the polyps of this Hydroid colony

The charming Jason mirabilis
