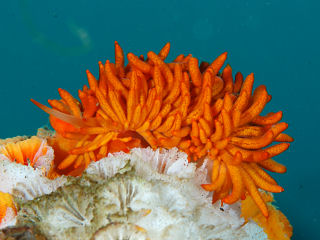
- An orange individual of Phestilla melanobrachia

Scientific classification
- Kingdom: Animalia
- Phylum: Mollusca
- Class: Gastropoda
- Order: Nudibranchia
- Suborder: Aeolidacea
- Family: Trinchesiidae
- Genus: Phestilla
- Species: P. melanobrachia

Binomial name
- Phestilla melanobrachia Bergh, 1874

Synonyms
- Tenellia melanobrachia (Bergh, 1874); Phestilla melanobranchia [spelling error]

= Phestilla melanobrachia =

Species of gastropod

Phestilla melanobrachia is a species of sea slug, an aeolid nudibranch, a marine gastropod mollusk in the family Trinchesiidae.

There are two known colour forms of Phestilla melanobrachia, black and orange. Both of these feed on corals in the family Dendrophylliidae and have been found to be genetically identical.

== Distribution ==
This species was described from the Philippines. It has been reported from Hong Kong and Japan to Malaysia and East to Australia.
