= Urticina eques =

Scientific classification
- Kingdom: Animalia
- Phylum: Cnidaria
- Subphylum: Anthozoa
- Class: Hexacorallia
- Order: Actiniaria
- Family: Actiniidae
- Genus: Urticina
- Species: U. eques

Binomial name
- Urticina eques (Gosse, 1858)

Synonyms
- Bulocera eques; Madoniactis lofotensis Danielssen, 1890; Rhodactinia crassicornis (O. F. Müller); Tealia lofotensis Danielssen; Urticina lofotensis (Danielssen, 1890)

Species of sea anemone

Urticina eques is a species of sea anemone in the family Actiniidae. It is commonly known as the white-spotted rose anemone or strawberry anemone.

== Taxonomy ==
According to one authority, the populations of Urticina eques found in the Pacific Ocean are not the same species as those in the Atlantic Ocean and should instead be considered to be conspecific with Cribrinopsis albopunctata, a new species from Kamchatka.

== Description ==
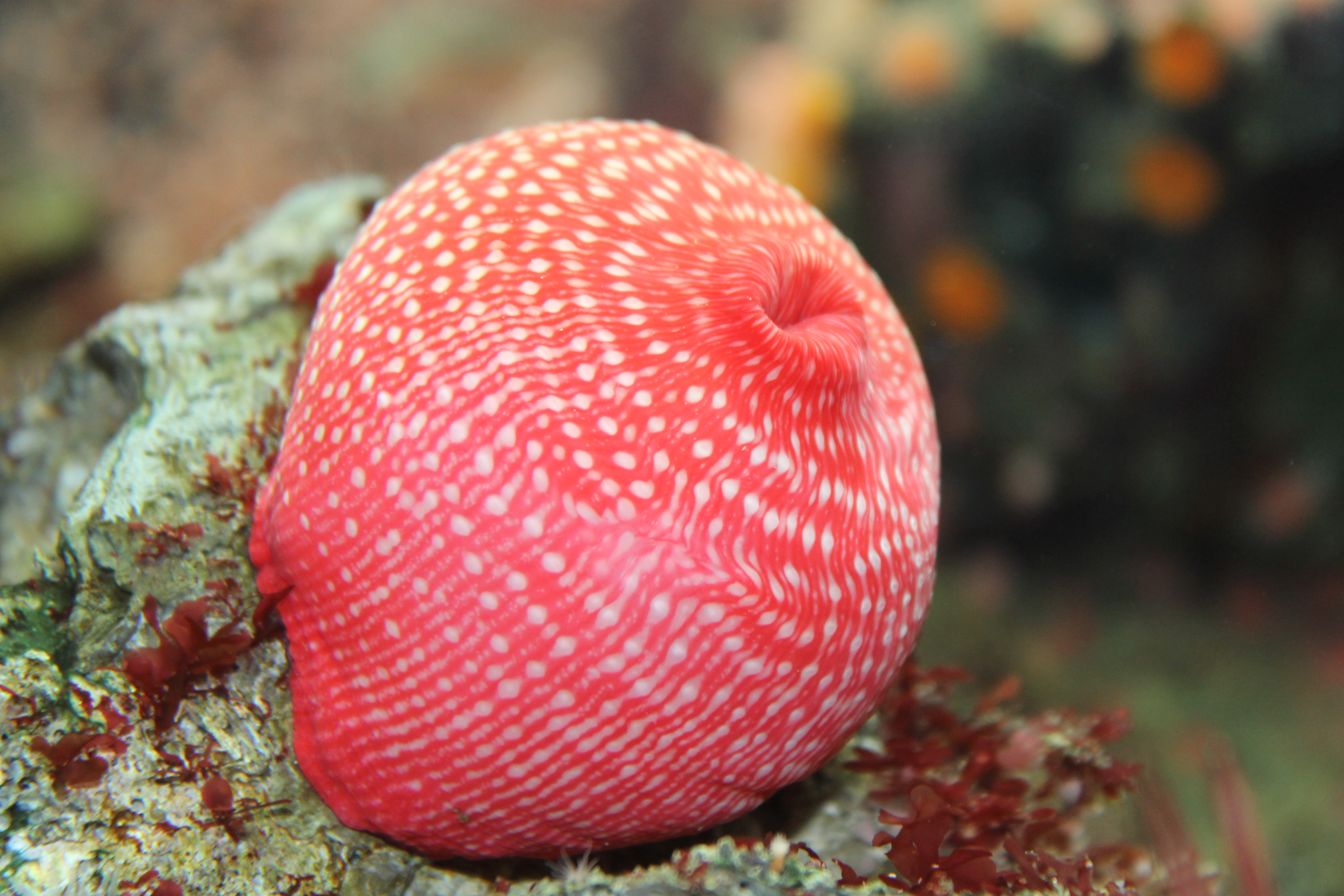
Tentacles retracted

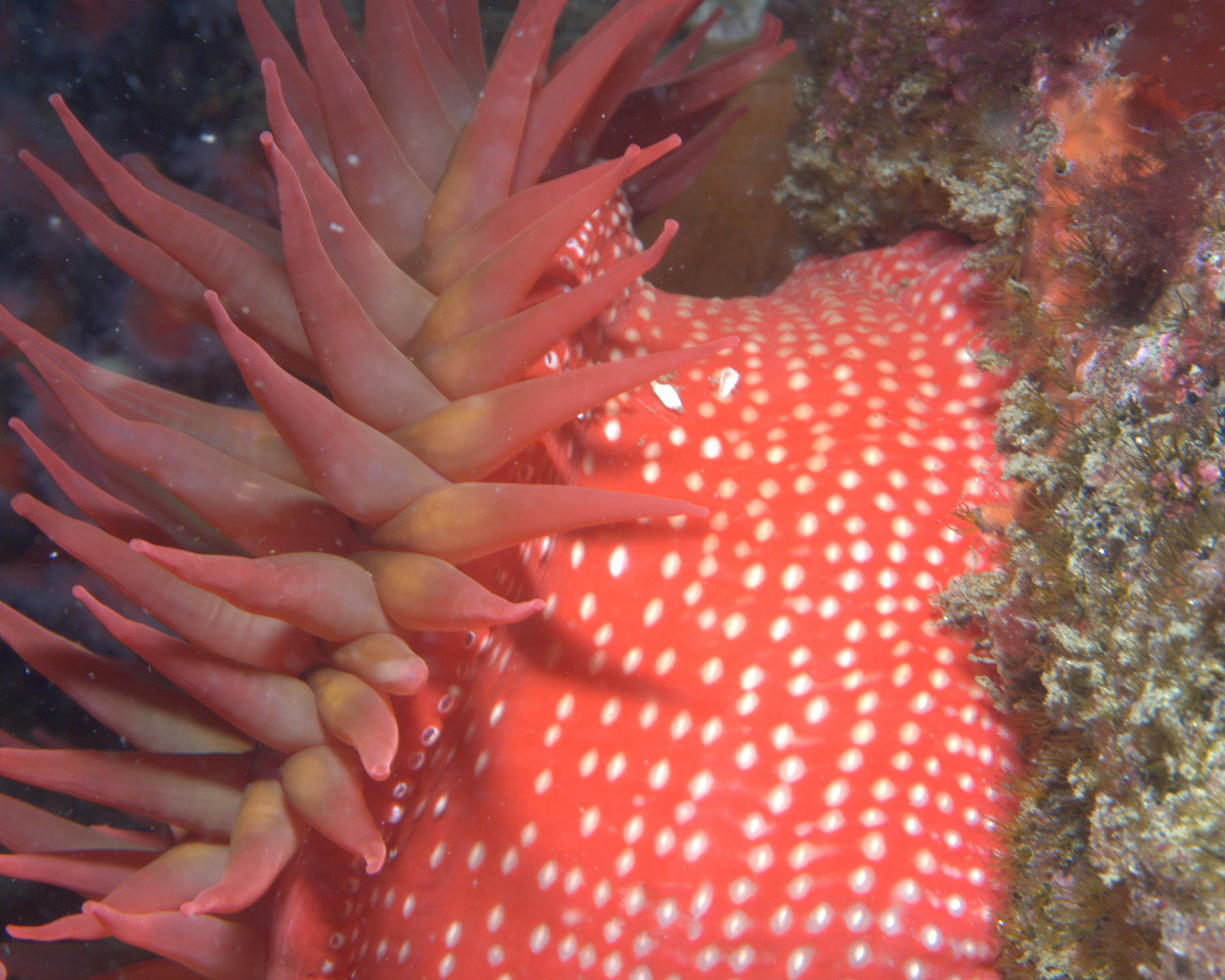
Tentacles protracted

Urticina eques has a smooth, red column with vertical rows of white tubercles. In contrast to other similar species, the tubercles are not adhesive and do not normally attract gravel and shell fragments. There are no acontia with stinging nematocysts protruding through the body wall. The oral disk is plain red and the tapering tentacles are red and have no transverse striations. This is a large sea anemone with a diameter of up to 10 cm (4 in) and 15 cm (6 in) length.

== Distribution and habitat ==
Urticina eques is found in the North Atlantic Ocean and the Pacific coast of North America. It occurs between low water mark and a depth of about 15 m (49 ft). It is found on rocks and pilings, in crevices and gullies and favours exposed habitats with fast moving water.

== Biology ==
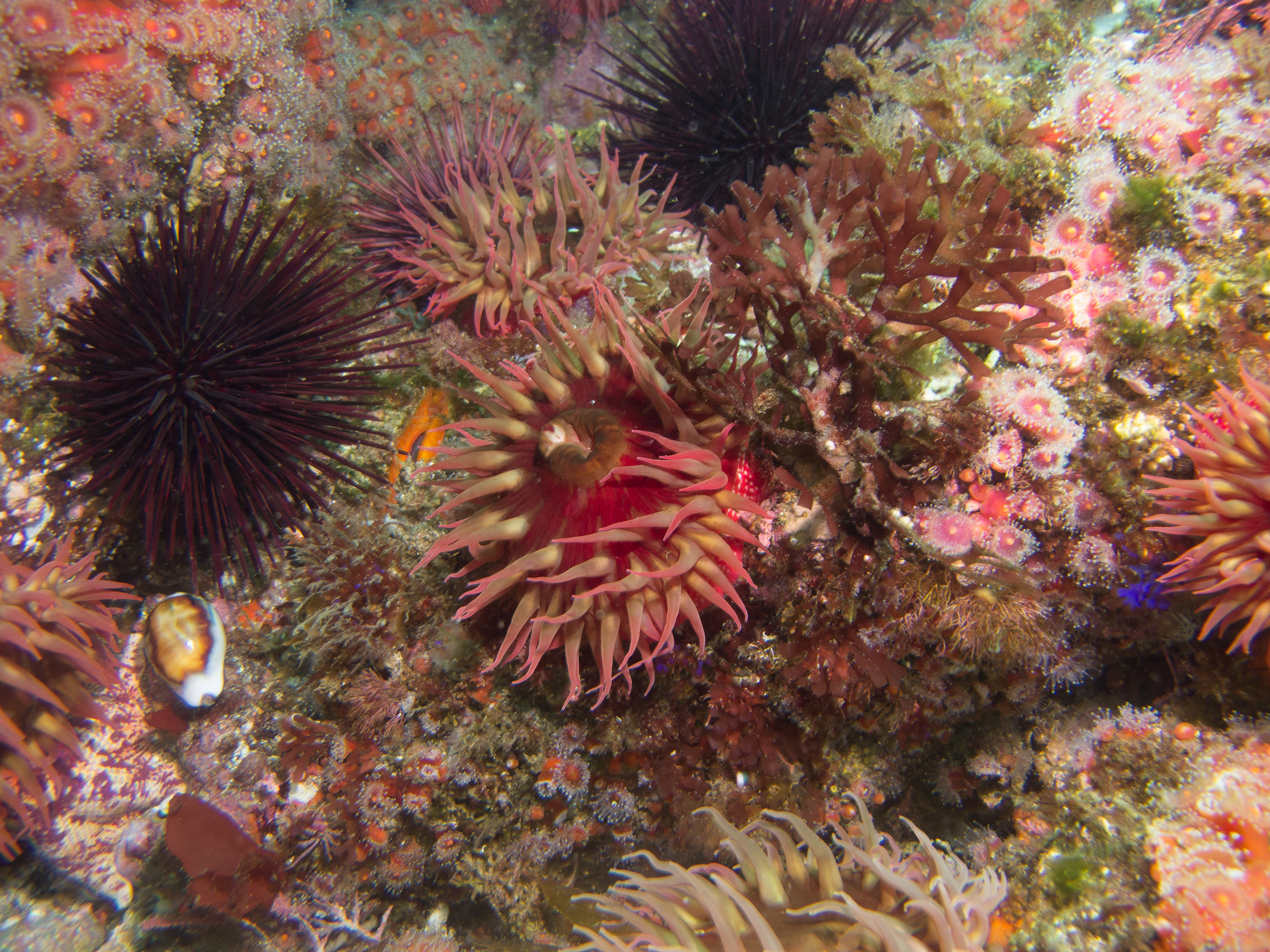
Urticina eques in a Channel Islands sea bottom rich in marine life. Also seen are a purple sea urchin, a chestnut cowrie, and many strawberry anemones.

Urticina eques is dioecious. In California, female ripeness occurs in December as the sea temperature begins to fall. The large eggs, 1,200 μm (0.047 in) in diameter, are produced at intervals, and the release of sperm by the males follows shortly afterwards. In some females, large oocytes also release eggs at other times of year. The gametes emerge through the mouth of the anemone and fertilisation is external. The eggs develop into planula larvae which drift with the current before settling and growing into new individuals.

== Ecology ==
Juveniles of the painted greenling, a species of fish, have a facultative association with Urticina eques. They are often found among the tentacles or close to the column, especially when resting and inactive at night. According to researcher Joel Elliot, these associations occurred mainly in moderately exposed locations where the sea anemones and fish were both numerous; the large anemone offers the fish protection from predators and provides a safe environment for it to feed on copepods and other small invertebrates that are also associated with the anemone. The research indicated that the fish seemed to be unharmed by the anemone's nematocysts. The anemones themselves were thought not to derive any benefits from the arrangement.
