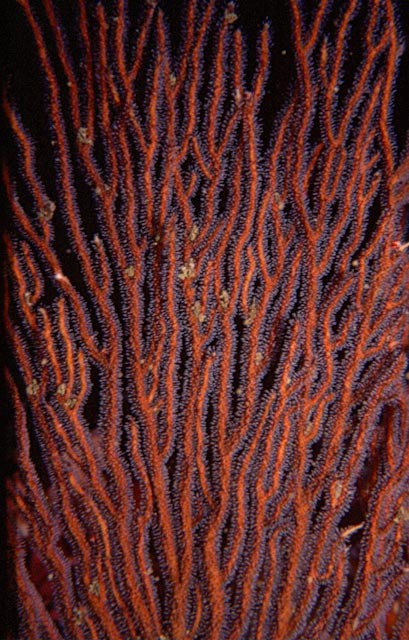

Scientific classification
- Kingdom: Animalia
- Phylum: Cnidaria
- Class: Hydrozoa
- Order: Anthoathecata
- Family: Solanderiidae
- Genus: Solanderia
- Species: S. procumbens

Binomial name
- Solanderia procumbens (Carter, 1873)

Synonyms
- Ceratella procumbens Carter, 1873; Ceratella spinosa Carter, 1873

= Grey fan hydroid =

Species of cnidarian

The grey fan hydroid (Solanderia procumbens) is a large colonial hydroid in the family Solanderiidae.

== Description ==
The grey fan hydroid grows as a grey to dark brown fan-shaped colony that may be 40 cm in total height. It has variable branching in a single plane. The main stem of old colonies can be quite thick and flattened in the plane of branching. Smaller branches are round in section. Hydranths are scattered irregularly on the stem and branches.

== Distribution ==
This colonial animal is found only around the South African coast from the Atlantic side of the Cape Peninsula to KwaZulu-Natal in 10-130m under water.

== Ecology ==
Gonophores (reproductive structures) are irregularly spaced on the branches and are rounded with short stalks.
