= Phestilla panamica =

Scientific classification
- Kingdom: Animalia
- Phylum: Mollusca
- Class: Gastropoda
- Order: Nudibranchia
- Suborder: Aeolidacea
- Family: Trinchesiidae
- Genus: Phestilla
- Species: P. panamica

Binomial name
- Phestilla panamica Rudman, 1982

Species of gastropod

Phestilla panamica is a species of sea slug, an aeolid nudibranch, a marine gastropod mollusk in the family Trinchesiidae. The species feeds on the hard coral genus Porites.

== Distribution ==
This species was described from Saboga Island, Pearl Island Group, Panama, 8°37′N 79°04′W.
