= Burnaia helicochorda =

- Burnaia helicochorda

Scientific classification
- Kingdom: Animalia
- Phylum: Mollusca
- Class: Gastropoda
- Order: Nudibranchia
- Suborder: Aeolidacea
- Family: Facelinidae
- Genus: Burnaia
- Species: B. helicochorda

Binomial name
- Burnaia helicochorda (Miller, 1988)

Synonyms
- Aeolidia helicochorda Miller, 1988

Genus of gastropods

Burnaia helicochorda is a species of marine nudibranch in the family Facelinidae. It is the sole species of the genus Burnaia.

== Etymology ==
This genus was named for Robert Burn, an important figure in the advancements of sea slug knowledge.

The species was named for the shape of the diverticulum, cord-like, and twisting in a spiral like a helix.

== Taxonomic History ==
Burnaia's type species, Burnaia helicochorda, was established by Miller in 1988 under the name Aeolidia helicochorda.

Later in 2001, Miller reviewed the genera of Aeolidiidae and established Burnaia as the characteristics of B. helicochorda did not fit well within any other genus, possessing horseshoe-shaped rows of cerata, lamellated rhinophores, and a jaw that differed from other Aeolidia. At this time, no more specimens had been found since the specie's initial discovery.

In 2015, Burnaia received a re-evaluation. There was finally fresh material of new specimens available, allowing not only for re-description of physical morphology but for analysis via molecular phylogeny to assess its genetic relationships. This molecular analysis found that Burnaia fits squarely amongst Facelinidae despite its rather Aeolidiidae-like appearance.

The most recent global revision of Aeolidacean taxonomy maintains its position as a Facelinid.

== Distribution ==
Burnaia helicochorda was originally described from Goat Island Bay, New Zealand. Specimens have also been found in eastern Australia and Tasmania.

== Diet ==
As of the 2015 study, there has been no information on the diet of Burnaia helicochorda. If it is truly like other Facelinids, it could be assumed it feeds on Hydrozoans, but further study is needed.
