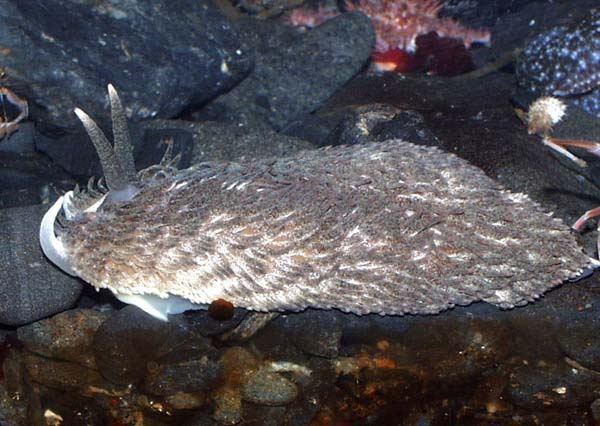
- A live individual of Aeolidia papillosa

Scientific classification
- Kingdom: Animalia
- Phylum: Mollusca
- Class: Gastropoda
- Order: Nudibranchia
- Suborder: Cladobranchia
- Family: Aeolidiidae
- Genus: Aeolidia; Cuvier, 1798

Synonyms
- Aeolis Menke, 1844 (Invalid: Placed on the Official Index by ICZN Opinion 779); Eolidia Cuvier, 1816; Eolis Cuvier, 1805

= Aeolidia =

Genus of gastropods

Aeolidia is a genus of sea slugs, aeolid nudibranchs, marine gastropod mollusks in the family Aeolidiidae.

== Species ==
Species within the genus Aeolidia include:

- Aeolidia campbelli (Cunningham, 1871)
- Aeolidia collaris Odhner, 1921
- Aeolidia filomenae Kienberger, Carmona, Pola, Padula, Gosliner, and Cervera, 2016
- Aeolidia herculea Bergh, 1894
- Aeolidia libitinaria Valdés, Lundsten & N. G. Wilson, 2018
- Aeolidia loui Kienberger, Carmona, Pola, Padula, Gosliner, and Cervera, 2016
- Aeolidia papillosa (Linnaeus, 1761)

Taxa inquirenda

- Aeolidia bella (Rüppell & Leuckart, 1830) (taxon inquirendum)
- Aeolidia pelseneeri Risbec, 1937

Species brought into synonymy

- Aeolidia edmondsoni Ostergaard, 1955: synonym of Phestilla lugubris (Bergh, 1870)
- Aeolidia farallonensis Gosliner and Behrens, 1996: synonym of Aeolidia herculea Bergh, 1894
- Aeolidia grandis Volodchenko, 1941: synonym of Aeolidia herculea Bergh, 1894
- Aeolidia helicochorda M. C. Miller, 1988: synonym of Burnaia helicochorda (M. C. Miller, 1988)
- Aeolidia poindimiei Risbec, 1928: synonym of Phyllodesmium poindimiei (Risbec, 1928)
- Aeolidia serotina Bergh, 1873: synonym of Aeolidia campbelli (Cunningham, 1871)
- Aeolidia verrucosa M. Sars, 1829: synonym of Flabellina verrucosa (M. Sars, 1829)
