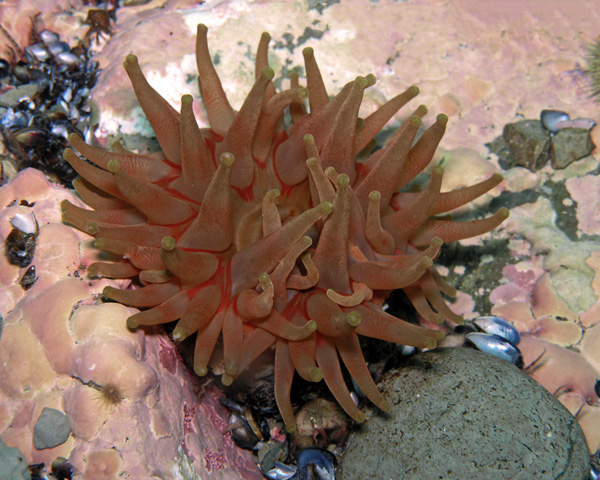

Scientific classification
- Kingdom: Animalia
- Phylum: Cnidaria
- Subphylum: Anthozoa
- Class: Hexacorallia
- Order: Actiniaria
- Family: Actiniidae
- Genus: Urticina
- Species: U. felina

Binomial name
- Urticina felina (Linnaeus, 1761)

Synonyms
- List: Actinea coriacea; Actinea crassicornis Fabricius; Actinia felina (Linnaeus, 1761); Actinia gemmacea; Actinia halsatica; Actinia holsatica Müller, 1806; Actinia papillosa Ehrenberg, 1834; Bolocera eques Gosse, 1860; Bunodes crassicornis; Cereus coriaceus; Cereus papillosus; Cribrina coriacea Ehrenberg; Cribrina papillosa Ehrenberg; Priapus felinus Linnaeus, 1761; Rhodactinia daevisii Agassiz, 1847; Rhodactinia davisii Agassiz; Tealia felina (Linnaeus, 1767); Tealia greenei Wright, 1859; Tealia greenii Wright, 1859; Urticina davisii (Agassiz)

= Dahlia anemone =

Species of cnidarian

The dahlia anemone (Urticina felina) is a sea anemone found in the north Atlantic Ocean, the North Sea and the Baltic Sea. Its colour is variable, from deep red to brown or purplish, with green spots and darker tentacles. Dahlia anemones live attached to rock on the seabed from the lower tidal limit down to a depth of 100 m and also attached to other organisms. Their diet comprises small fish and crustaceans, which they immobilize by firing groups of stinging cells (cnidae) into them. Dahlia anemones are closely related to mottled anemones, and both species are usually referred to as northern red anemones.

== Description ==
The base is up to 120 mm across and firmly adherent to the rock. Deep sea specimens are usually larger than inshore ones. The column is usually shorter than its diameter and its surface is covered in verrucae. There is a parapet at the top where the verrucae tend to be organised into rows. The verrucae usually have bits of gravel and debris attached to them and the contracted anemone has the appearance of a rounded hummock of gravel. The disc is not broader than the parapet and has up to 160 short tentacles arranged in multiples of ten. The colour is very variable; some individuals have a red column with green blotches, grey verrucae and greyish banded tentacles; others have a red column and disc with grey verrucae and white tentacles. The tentacles are often banded and in many individuals there are thin red lines on the disc visible between the tentacles.

== Distribution ==
Dahlia anemones are found in the Arctic Ocean, the Baltic Sea, the North Sea and the northern Atlantic Ocean as far south as the Bay of Biscay and the Gulf of Maine.

== Habitat ==
Dahlia anemones are found on rocks and boulders from the lower shore down to depths of 100 metres. It occurs in rock pools, in crevices and gullies, among the holdfasts of Laminaria spp., in caves and partly buried in gravel.
