= Hermosita hakunamatata =

Scientific classification
- Kingdom: Animalia
- Phylum: Mollusca
- Class: Gastropoda
- Order: Nudibranchia
- Suborder: Aeolidacea
- Family: Facelinidae
- Genus: Hermosita
- Species: H. hakunamatata

Binomial name
- Hermosita hakunamatata Ortea, Caballer & Espinosa, 2003

Species of gastropod

Hermosita hakunamatata is a brightly coloured species of sea slug, specifically an aeolid nudibranch. It is a marine gastropod mollusc in the family Facelinidae.

== Distribution ==
The holotype of this species was found at Parque Marino Ballena, Uvita, on the Pacific Ocean coast of Costa Rica. It has been reported from Isla Isabel, Nayarit, Mexico and Panama.

== Biology ==
Hermosita hakunamatata feeds on the hydroid Solanderia.
