= Hermosita =

Scientific classification
- Kingdom: Animalia
- Phylum: Mollusca
- Class: Gastropoda
- Order: Nudibranchia
- Suborder: Aeolidacea
- Family: Facelinidae
- Genus: Hermosita; Gosliner & Behrens, 1986

Genus of gastropods

Hermosita is a genus of sea slugs, specifically of aeolid nudibranchs. Only two species are known to belong to this genus, marine gastropod molluscs in the family Facelinidae.

== Biology ==
Both species of Hermosita feed on the hydroid Solanderia; a characteristic shared with the Pleurolidiidae.

== Species ==
Species in this genus include:

- Hermosita hakunamatata (Ortea, Caballer & Espinosa, 2003)
- Hermosita sangria Gosliner & Behrens, 1986
