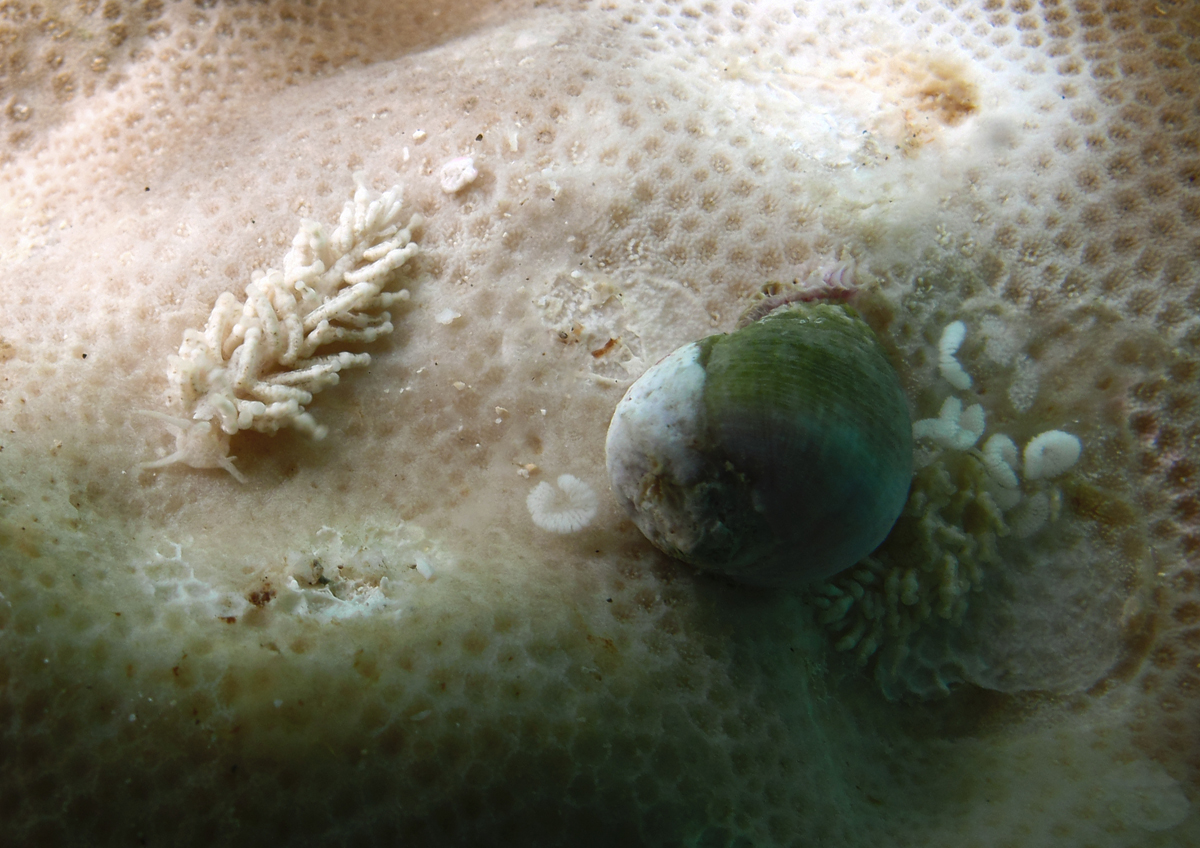

Scientific classification
- Kingdom: Animalia
- Phylum: Mollusca
- Class: Gastropoda
- Order: Nudibranchia
- Suborder: Aeolidacea
- Family: Trinchesiidae
- Genus: Phestilla
- Species: P. minor

Binomial name
- Phestilla minor Rudman, 1981

= Phestilla minor =

Species of gastropod

Phestilla minor is a species of sea slug in the Trichechidae family. It is a type of aeolid nudibranch (Latin for naked gills) under the Aeolidina suborder. Phestilla minor is a benthic sea slug that is a very small, slow-moving organism found in marine habitats all over the world.

Phestilla minor is one of over 2000 species of sea slugs.

== Description ==
Phestilla minor is a small marine invertebrate that can grow to reach a maximum length of approximately 7mm.

=== Physical characteristics ===
The body is separated into three sections: the foot, head and visceral mass. Its foot has a flattened sole-like make-up that is used for moving over substrates. Phestilla minor has a swollen distal tip and one swollen collar region below the tip.

This species is coloured to blend in with its surroundings, only found to be in one colour form, with very minimal pigmentation which allows it to camouflage into its environment, particularly the colour of the coral colony. This acts as a defence mechanism from potential prey which can include fish, lobster, crabs and also humans. Its other form is a very deeply pigmented opaque bleach colour which blends in with the shape and colour of tiny abrasions, scars formed by feeding fish, that are scattered all over reef corals known as porites colonies.

== Ecology ==
=== Distribution ===
Phestilla minor has a wide Indo-West Pacific distribution. It is a marine species found commonly in marine habitats such as reefs, intertidal areas, and deep oceans particularly in warm, tropical areas. This species has been recorded from East Africa (Tanzania), Australia (Great Barrier Reef) and Hawaii. In Australia, the Phestilla minor has been recorded along the east coast from northern Queensland down to northern New South Wales.

=== Habitat ===
Phestilla mMinor is found only in marine habitats, at the bottom of the ocean. Known to have very sedentary lives this species spends most of its life attached to one organism which is usually coral reef. Phestilla minor is found to always be associated with colonies of Porites, a stony coral on which it feeds.

=== Diet ===
Phestilla minor sea slug feeds on the hard-coral genus Porites, the same one on which it lives. It has a pair of jaw and a radula (tongue-like organism) that consist of multiple rows of very small teeth which they use to feed e.g. on plankton, algae and jellyfish. The radula is used to gather food particles through scraping or tearing of other organisms. Whilst feeding, Phestilla minor uses many defensive behaviours to protect or harm potential predators. The sea slugs cover their food with particles of mucus as a defence mechanism to protect their food from potential prey. Luckily, there are very few organisms that will prey on Phestilla minor. Organisms such as spines, exoskeletons, and stinging cells are the only known forms of prey to this sea slug.

=== Reproduction ===
When mating, Phestilla minor uses a powerful mix of chemicals to attract a mating partner. As the organism is majorly blind, it uses these chemicals as a sexual attractant known as a pheromone to help the organisms find each other. These protein pheromones are used by the species in order to attract a potential mating partner. It is a chemical that the slug uses to change the behaviour of another animal, a 'behaviour-altering' agent. This process of using a pheromone message has also been found in many other marine animals e.g. fish and dolphins, and research from Phestilla minor can be synthesised to develop greater research for other marine life.

Phestilla minor spends majority of its life in isolation and attached to one organism; however, during warmer summer seasons, the species gather in masses. Gatherings consist of hundreds of individual sea slugs that all gather with the intention of breeding. This occasion of mass gathering of the sea slugs can last anywhere between an hour to a few days.

During this process of gathering, eggs from the slugs are laid in large masses which can vary anywhere between one hundred to millions of individual eggs waiting to be fertilized. Phestilla minor will normally form a pair with another sea slug in which they lay their eggs. When laying their eggs, they will normally produce approximately 10 separate egg masses, each egg mass consistent of approximately 120 individual eggs. The eggs are usually laid in conjunction with the coral colonies on which the organism attaches itself to. The eggs grow at a very rapid speed, starting from a size of 2 mm, growing to a mature size of approximately 9 mm wide which usually takes about 10 days in total. As the larvae are lecithotrophic, they are competent to metamorphose almost immediately after hatching, which is usually 5–6 days post-fertilization. The eggs laid by the Phestilla minor can be either curved or straight and be in the form of a semicircle.

The fertilization process may not take place instantly, but whilst waiting for the eggs to reach their full maturity, the sperm can be stored within an organ called the seminal receptacle. When the eggs finally do hatch, a larva called veliger (free-swimming creatures that have a clear, thin shell) emerges to create a hard shell around them to protect itself, a process that takes around seven days in total.

Phestilla minor is a hermaphrodite, meaning that each individual organism consists of both male and female sexual organs which allows it to produce both eggs and sperm simultaneously. The Phestilla minor’s flexibility in sexual roles and allocation is unique to all hermaphrodites. Other examples of hermaphrodites are worms, bryozoans, trematodes, snails and barnacles. Within an individual slug, the reproductive systems keep these organisms and systems completely separate. Through possessing two different sexes it means that between mating partners there can be serious conflicts of interests which can consequently lead to conflicting compatibility interests. This is because both may choose to mate in the role of either the male or the female.

=== Threats ===
When sea slugs hatch or break out of their eggs, it is common for only a few eggs to survive. Due to the large masses of eggs hatching, they are at high risk from predators eating them. However, the large number of eggs increases the chances of some eggs surviving to adulthood, where they are then able to fend for themselves using protective strategies and be able to reproduce in the future.

Because Phestilla minor is such a small organism, this animal is at such high risk and is vulnerable to an array of other sea creatures. Predators of Phestilla minor include fish, crabs, lobsters and many other animals. Humans are another predator of the Phestilla minor, being caught for aquarium purposes, to be sold on the exotic pet markets and as part of a dish.

Another threat that the sea slug faces, is from each other. Sea slugs are known to be cannibals, eating each other when food supplies are low, either dead or alive. Typically, it is the larger slugs that feed on the smaller slugs.

=== Life span ===
Most sea slug species will live for approximately one year, with some species living for less than one year. Phestilla minor is known to have a lifespan of about one year. It becomes sexually mature in about 38 days.

== Human relations ==
=== Conservation status ===
Sea slugs are not listed as a threatened or endangered species. No species of this marine animal are listed by the International Union for Conservation of Nature. Sea slugs are not currently listed on the endangered species list, however, it is their habitat that is vulnerable. Environments such as coral reefs are under threat by things such as pollution, habitat destruction and habitat loss.

=== Further research ===
Whilst sea slugs, and particularly Phestilla minor are such a tiny organism, they hold large significance in the field of scientific research. Sea slugs are extremely helpful to people and particularly scientists. The research is significant in laboratory studies of neuroethology, which is the study of how the brain controls behaviour. The slugs provide the basis of many testing grounds for a lot of theories and investigation into how the nervous system works. Through observation and analysis of the sea slug’s natural behaviours and sensory cues that trigger these, scientists gain new research material by studying them under experimental conditions to be used in laboratories. Study is conducted into the mating rituals, feeding, reproductive cycles of the slugs which guides scientists to finding linkages between sea slugs and other animals.

== Reference list ==
- Anthes, N.; Michiels, N. (2007). "Reproductive morphology, mating behavior, and spawning ecology of cephalaspid sea slugs (Aglajidae and Gastropteridae)". Invertebrate Biology. 126 (4): 335–365. Bibcode:2007InvBi.126..335A. doi:10.1111/j.1744-7410.2007.00096.x.
- "How sea slugs fall in love". freshscience.org.au. 2007.
- Nimbs, M.; Smith, A.D. (2018). "Beyond Capricornia: Tropical Sea Slugs (Gastropoda, Heterobranchia) extend their distribution into the Tasman Sea". Diversity. 10 (3): 99. Bibcode:2018Diver..10...99N. doi:10.3390/d10030099.
- Ritson-Williams, R.; Shjegstad, S.; Paul, V. (2007). "Larval metamorphic competence in four species of Phestilla". Journal of Experimental Marine Biology and Ecology. 351 (1–2): 160–167. doi:10.1016/j.jembe.2007.06.010.
- Rudman, W.B. (1981). "Further studies on the anatomy and ecology of opisthobranch molluscs feeding on the scleractinian coral Porites". Zoological Journal of the Linnean Society. 71 (4): 373–412. doi:10.1111/j.1096-3642.1981.tb01136.x.
- Rudman, W.B. (1999). "Phestilla minor". Australian Museum Sea Slug Forum website.
- "The secret lives of sea slugs". Marine biological laboratory. May 2006.
- Wang, A.; Conti-Jerpe, E.; Richards, J.L.; Baker, D. (2020). "Phestilla subodiosus sp. Nov. (Nudibranchia, Trinchesiidae), a corallivorous pest species in the aquarium trade". ZooKeys (909): 1–24. Bibcode:2020ZooK..909....1W. doi:10.3897/zookeys.909.35278. PMC 7015969. PMID 32089632.
