= Robert Burn (naturalist) =

Australian malacologist

Robert Burn (born 1937) is an Australian naturalist and citizen scientist. He has described approximately 100 species of nudibranchs and has co-authored around 100 papers published in scientific journals spanning sixty years. He is the leading living discoverer of nudibranch species in Victoria, Australia. His first solo publication, Nudibranchs and related molluscs, was published in February 2016 by Museums Victoria where Bob Burn is Honorary Associate. The nudibranch genus Burnaia is named in his honor.
