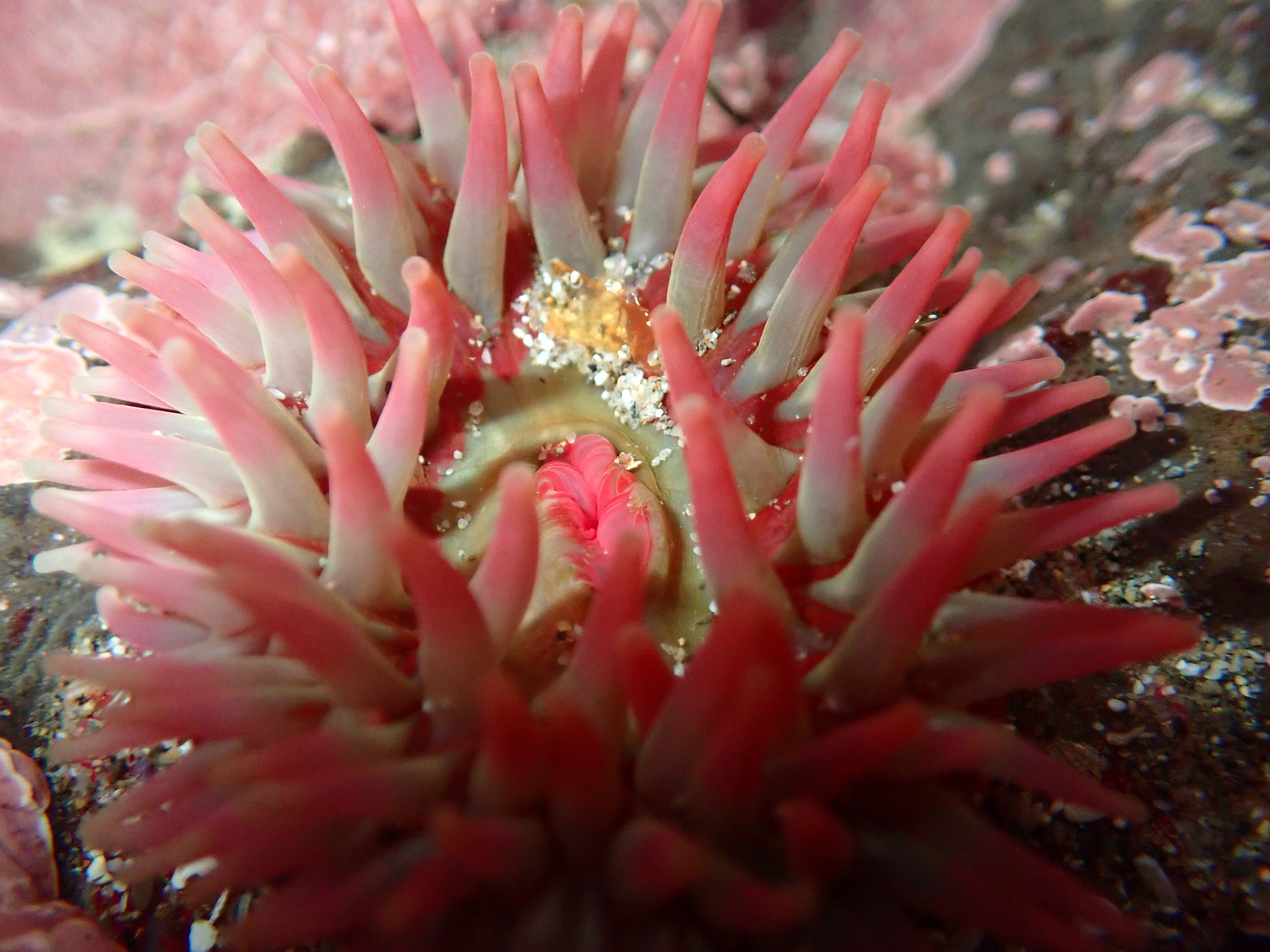

Scientific classification
- Kingdom: Animalia
- Phylum: Cnidaria
- Subphylum: Anthozoa
- Class: Hexacorallia
- Order: Actiniaria
- Family: Actiniidae
- Genus: Urticina
- Species: U. grebelnyi

Binomial name
- Urticina grebelnyi Sanamyan & Sanamyan, 2006

= Urticina grebelnyi =

Species of sea anemone

Urticina grebelnyi, commonly known as the painted anemone or Christmas anemone, is a large, colorful sea anemone found from Alaska to Southern California, at depths of 0 to 30 meters, often in high-current rocky habitats. They can live up to 80 years.

== Description ==
Painted anemones have a cylindrical column, about 15 cm diameter, which is covered in non-adhesive warts, and mottled with irregular patches of green, yellow, red, and white. The oral disk is more uniformly yellow-green or pale lilac in color. Large specimens can have up to 200 tentacles, which are generally the same color as the oral disk, often with reddish-pink or brown bands and blunt-ended tips.

== Natural History ==
Painted anemones are sessile, and feed opportunistically by catching crabs, urchins, mussels, gastropods, chitons, barnacles, and fish with their tentacles. The tip of each tentacle contains stinging cells that can paralyze prey. The stinging tentacles can also be used to fend of predators, which include various species of nudibranchs, sea stars, and snails.

== Etymology ==
The species is named after the Russian marine biologist Sergey Grebelnyi who first recognized this species in 1983.
