= Aeolidia libitinaria =

Scientific classification
- Kingdom: Animalia
- Phylum: Mollusca
- Class: Gastropoda
- Order: Nudibranchia
- Suborder: Aeolidacea
- Family: Aeolidiidae
- Genus: Aeolidia
- Species: A. libitinaria

Binomial name
- Aeolidia libitinaria Valdés, Lundsten & N. G. Wilson, 2018

Species of sea slug

Aeolidia libitinaria is a species of sea slug in the family Aeolidiidae. The species was found near a dead whale inside the Monteray Canyon, 380 meters below the ocean surface. It was named libitinaria, meaning "undertaker" in Latin, due to its ecology of being around the bones of dead whales. It is orange in coloration with yellow spots and white on the tips of its rhinophores, oral tentacles, and cerata. It grows up to 23 millimeters in length.

This species was photographed and collected by the ROV Doc Ricketts.
