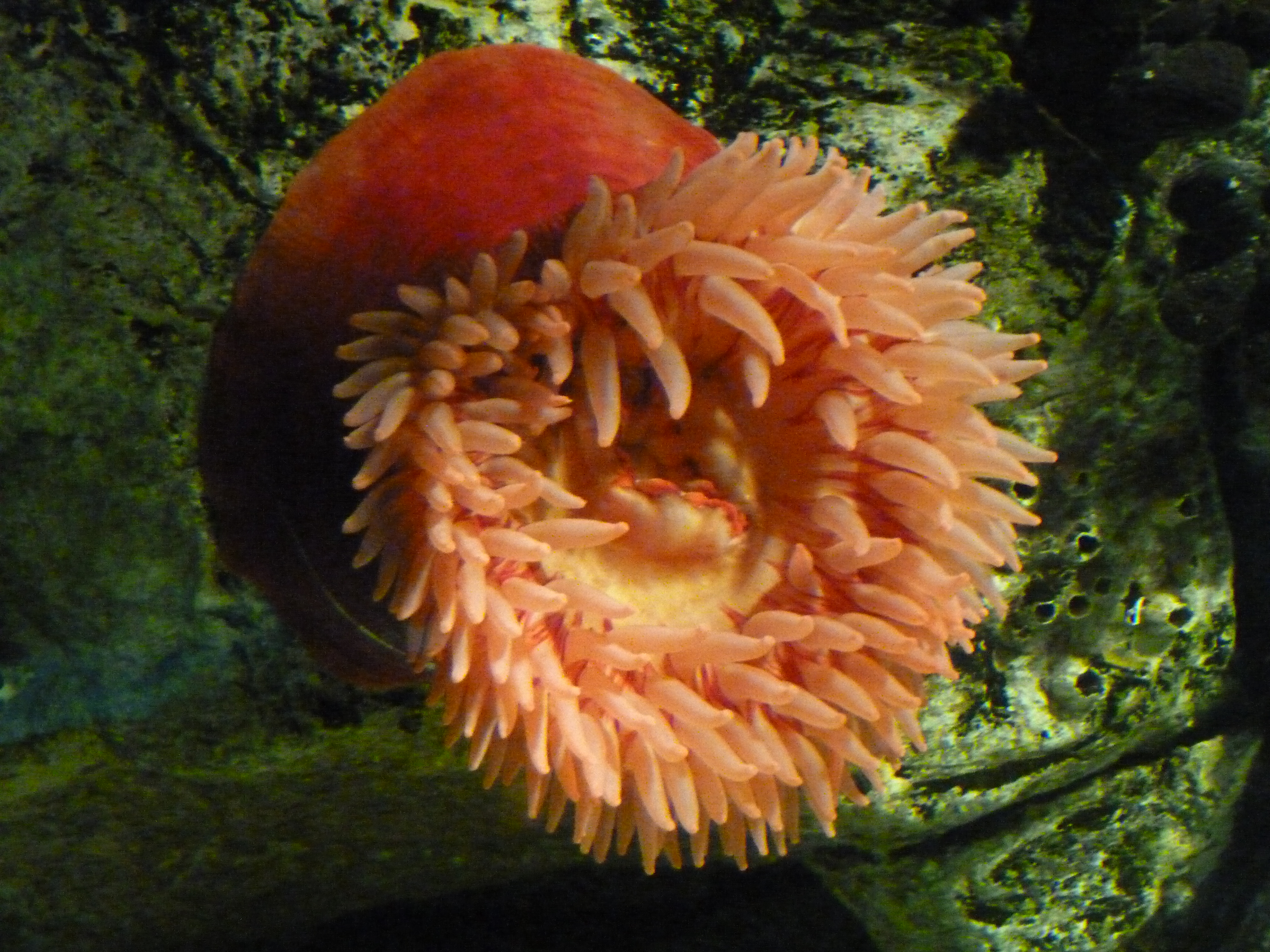

Scientific classification
- Kingdom: Animalia
- Phylum: Cnidaria
- Subphylum: Anthozoa
- Class: Hexacorallia
- Order: Actiniaria
- Family: Actiniidae
- Genus: Urticina
- Species: U. columbiana

Binomial name
- Urticina columbiana Verrill, 1922

Synonyms
- Tealia columbiana (Verrill, 1922); Tealia columbina

= Urticina columbiana =

Species of sea anemone

Urticina columbiana, common names crusty red anemone, Columbia sand anemone, sand anemone, and the sand-rose anemone, is a species of sea anemone in the family Actiniidae.

== Description ==
This species can grow to 25 cm high and can reach a diameter of 1 metre, making it one of the largest species of anemone. The tentacles are long and slender, taking the shape of a red column. The tubercles on the column are big and rough, having a white colour. They are organized in circular rows which protrude from the column. Unlike other species which may accumulate matter, the tubercles do not attach to ocean debris such as bits of shell. The column is red in colour.

No special spherules are present around the external rim of the oral disk beyond the tentacles.

== Distribution ==
Urticina columbiana species occurs in the Pacific Ocean from Vancouver Island to Baja California.

== Habitat ==
This species is found between the subtidal zone to a depth of 45 metres. It normally lives among shells, in soft sand or mud. It is usually partially buried, with tubercles mostly under the sea floor.

== Symbionts ==
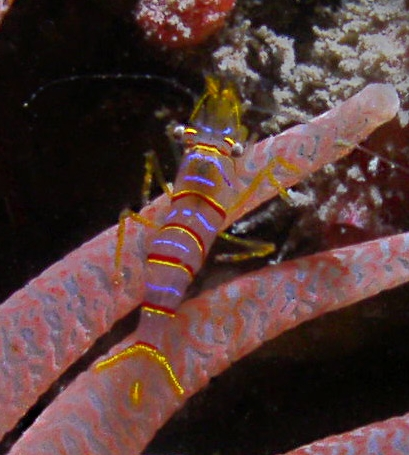
The candy stripe shrimp (Lebbeus grandimanus), a symbiont of Urticina columbiana

The candy stripe shrimp (Lebbeus grandimanus) is one of the symbionts of this species.
