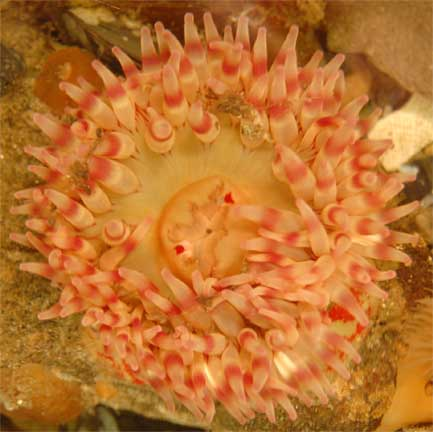

Scientific classification
- Kingdom: Animalia
- Phylum: Cnidaria
- Subphylum: Anthozoa
- Class: Hexacorallia
- Order: Actiniaria
- Family: Actiniidae
- Genus: Urticina
- Species: U. crassicornis

Binomial name
- Urticina crassicornis Mueller, 1776

Synonyms
- Actinia crassicornis Müller, 1776; Tealia crassicornis (Müller, 1776); Urticina felina kurila (Averincev, 1967)

= Urticina crassicornis =

Species of sea anemone

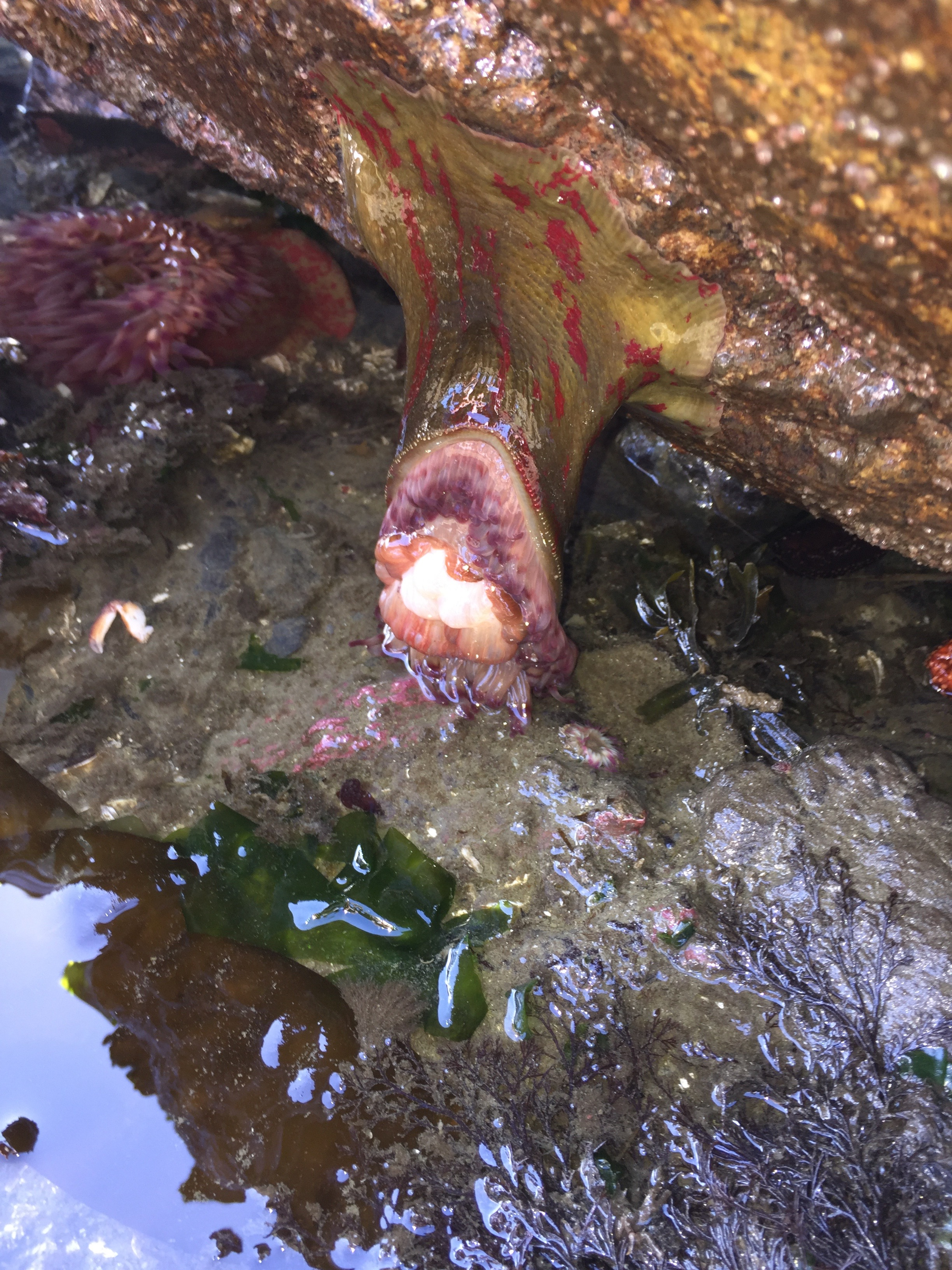
A Christmas or Mottled Anemone in Deception Pass State Park, Washington State.

Urticina crassicornis, commonly known as the mottled anemone, the painted anemone or the Christmas anemone, is a large and common intertidal and subtidal species of sea anemone. Its habitat includes a large portion of the coastal areas of the northern hemisphere, mainly polar regions, and it lives a solitary life for up to 80 years. Mottled anemones are similar to Dahlia anemones (U. felina) and both are commonly referred to as northern red anemones.

== Description ==
Urticina crassicornis is biradially symmetrical and ranges from 2 - 12.7 cm tall with a width of 1 - 7.6 cm. This sea anemone has a solid basal plate which is always flat. Its column can be olive green with or without red spots, solid red, cream, or brown. It always has small, inconspicuous tubercles but no acontia. Its tubercles are not white and do not usually accumulate bits of sand, gravel and shell. The tentacles, superior of the column and usually 100 in number, are green to opaque cream with red and white striations and semi-transparent when extended. The tentacles are conical, thick and blunt and arranged in 3 - 5 circular rings around the oral disc. The oral disc has no white striations and usually has the same color scheme as the tentacles.

== Geographical range and habitat ==
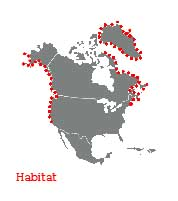
Range in North America (also in northeast Atlantic and northwest Pacific Oceans)

Urticina crassicornis is found in the north Pacific Ocean (along coasts of both Asia and North America), north Atlantic Ocean (North America and Europe) and Arctic Ocean (Asia, Europe and North America). In the northeastern Pacific Ocean, it ranges from intertidal and subtidal zones of the Pribilof Islands, Alaska to Monterey, California. In the Atlantic Ocean, it is found in intertidal and subtidal zones ranging from the Arctic Ocean above Newfoundland, Canada to Cape Cod, Massachusetts (USA), and also along the coasts of northwestern Europe. In the state of Washington this sea anemone more commonly frequents the Puget Sound compared to the Pacific Ocean front. It is found in a lower intertidal, upper subtidal zone - 30 m deep, inhabiting well protected and shaded areas. Urticina crassicornis is a benthic and sessile organism, firmly attached only to hard substrata. This sea anemone is frequently found on docks, wood pilings, and under large rock outcroppings.

== Feeding ==
A non-selective and opportunistic predator, Urticina crassicornis, may feed on crabs, sea urchins, mussels, gastropods, chitons, barnacles, fish, and sometimes sea stars and stranded jellies. A peculiar prey, the sun star, Pycnopodia helianthoides commonly known as the "Sunflower Star", is found in Washington state and has a size much greater than U. crassicornis, sometimes ranging up to 3 ft. in armspan. This anemone exhibits both intracellular and extracellular digestion. Food is caught within the tentacles which then move the prey towards the oral disc.

== Predators, parasites, and protection ==
In the Pacific, certain species of both Asteroidea and Gastropoda are known predators of this anemone. Demasterias imbricata (Asteroidea) and Aeolidia papillosa (Gastropoda) are two notably frequent predator species. Urticina crassicornis senses predation through a simple nerve net spanning along its column and tentacle walls. For protection, U. crassicornis inverts its tentacles to the inside of its body column and projects nematocysts. Minimal locomotion is possible if the organism is sensing extreme danger. Some species of amphipods are parasites of U. crassicornis living within its body cavity for the benefits of housing and food. These species are not affected by the nematocysts of U. crassicornis, which has the ability to kill other species of crustacean.

== Reproduction ==
Urticina crassicornis produces by both asexual and sexual reproduction. In the Atlantic populations, eggs and sperm are held and fertilized within the body column. The young are brooded between the mesenteries of the body and are emitted as smallish, well developed, young anemones. Spawning occurs in the spring amongst Puget Sound populations, when eggs (yolky, 0.7 mm in diameter) and sperm are released into the sea for fertilization. Urticina crassicornis's major sperm chromosomal proteins have been found to be two specialized histone H1 proteins which indicate a strong relation to the chromosomal proteins of bird and amphibians. After fertilization, a solid and ciliated blastula is created due to superficial cleavage. Six days following fertilization, a cone-shaped and benthic, larval planula develops. These planula then settle onto small rocks or the empty tubes of some annelid worms and rapidly develop into small anemones. 12 days after settlement, 8 tentacles appear. Further growth is slow – two months after settlement, 12 tentacles appear and the anemone is 0.88 mm in diameter; one year after settlement, the anemone has 35 tentacles and is 10 mm in diameter. Growth is proportional to food intake, not age. When starved, this anemone can stay alive for 9 months but does not grow. Urticina crassicornis is sexually mature with a diameter of 10 – 15 mm, being at least one year old.
