= Solanderia ericopsis =

Conservation status
- Not Threatened (NZ TCS)

Scientific classification
- Kingdom: Animalia
- Phylum: Cnidaria
- Class: Hydrozoa
- Order: Anthoathecata
- Family: Solanderiidae
- Genus: Solanderia
- Species: S. ericopis

Binomial name
- Solanderia ericopis (Carter 1873)

Synonyms
- Chitina ericopsis

Species of hydrozoan

Solanderia ericopsis is a hydroid in the family Solanderiidae, the group commonly known as tree hydroids or sea fan hydroids. S. ericopsis forms very large, conspicuous colonies from 5 to 50 cm in height, which are often noted by divers. They are usually strictly fan-shaped but can sometimes be bushy.

The colonies can be unusually long-lived: during long-term monitoring of defined rock areas around the Poor Knights Islands, one researcher observed a single colony of S. ericopsis over fifteen years, during which it reached 50 cm in height.

== Distribution ==
Solanderia ericopsis is found only in New Zealand, all around the country but mostly in the North Island; it can occur in rather shallow water, at depths ranging from 2 to 200 metres.
