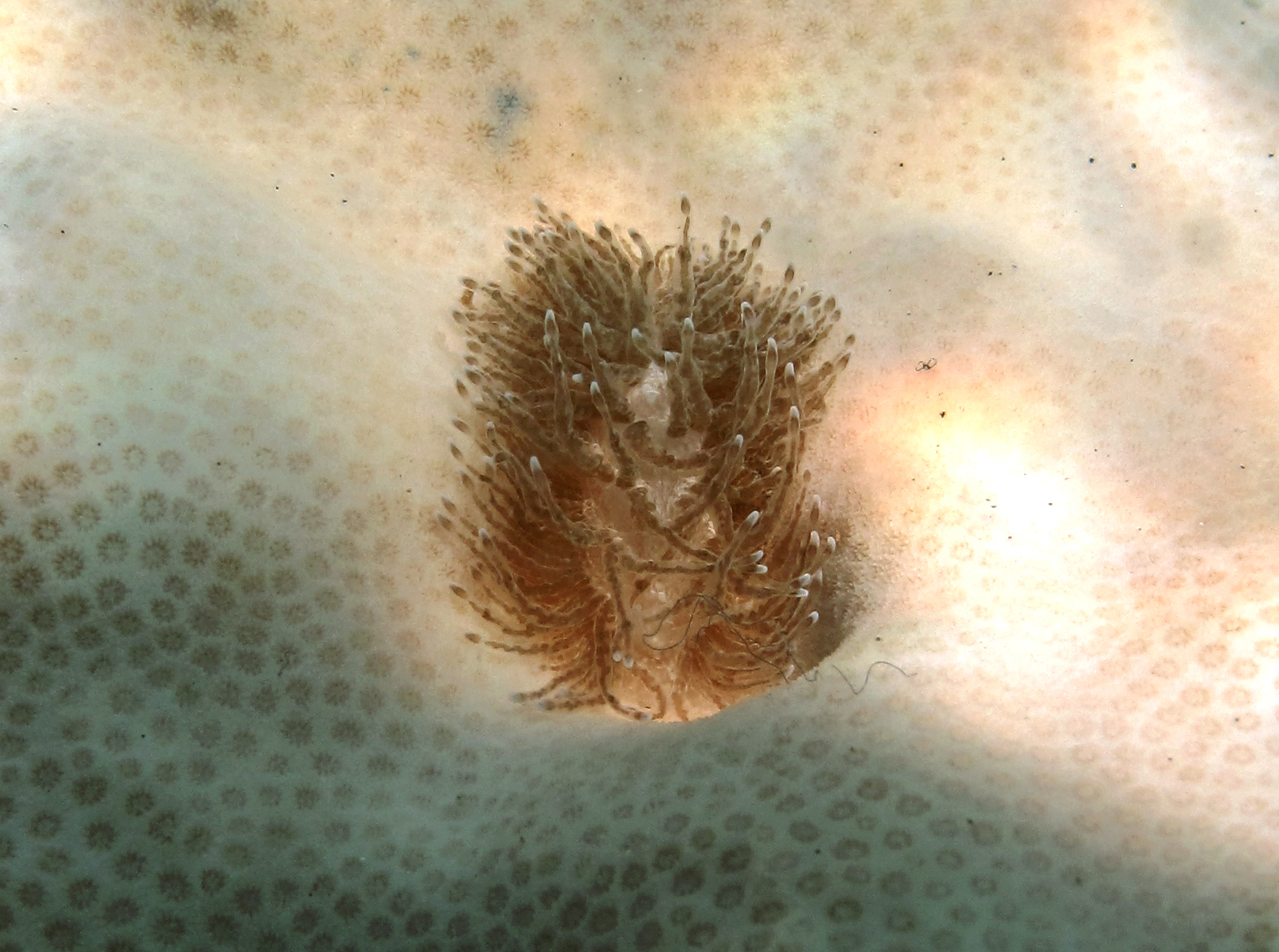

Scientific classification
- Kingdom: Animalia
- Phylum: Mollusca
- Class: Gastropoda
- Order: Nudibranchia
- Suborder: Aeolidacea
- Family: Trinchesiidae
- Genus: Phestilla
- Species: P. lugubris

Binomial name
- Phestilla lugubris (Bergh, 1870)

Synonyms
- Cratena lugubris Bergh, 1870

= Phestilla lugubris =

Species of gastropod

Phestilla lugubris is a species of sea slug, an aeolid nudibranch, a marine gastropod mollusk in the family Trinchesiidae.

== Distribution ==
This species was described from the Philippines. It is widespread in the tropical Indo-Pacific region. Its main prey is coral genus Porites.
