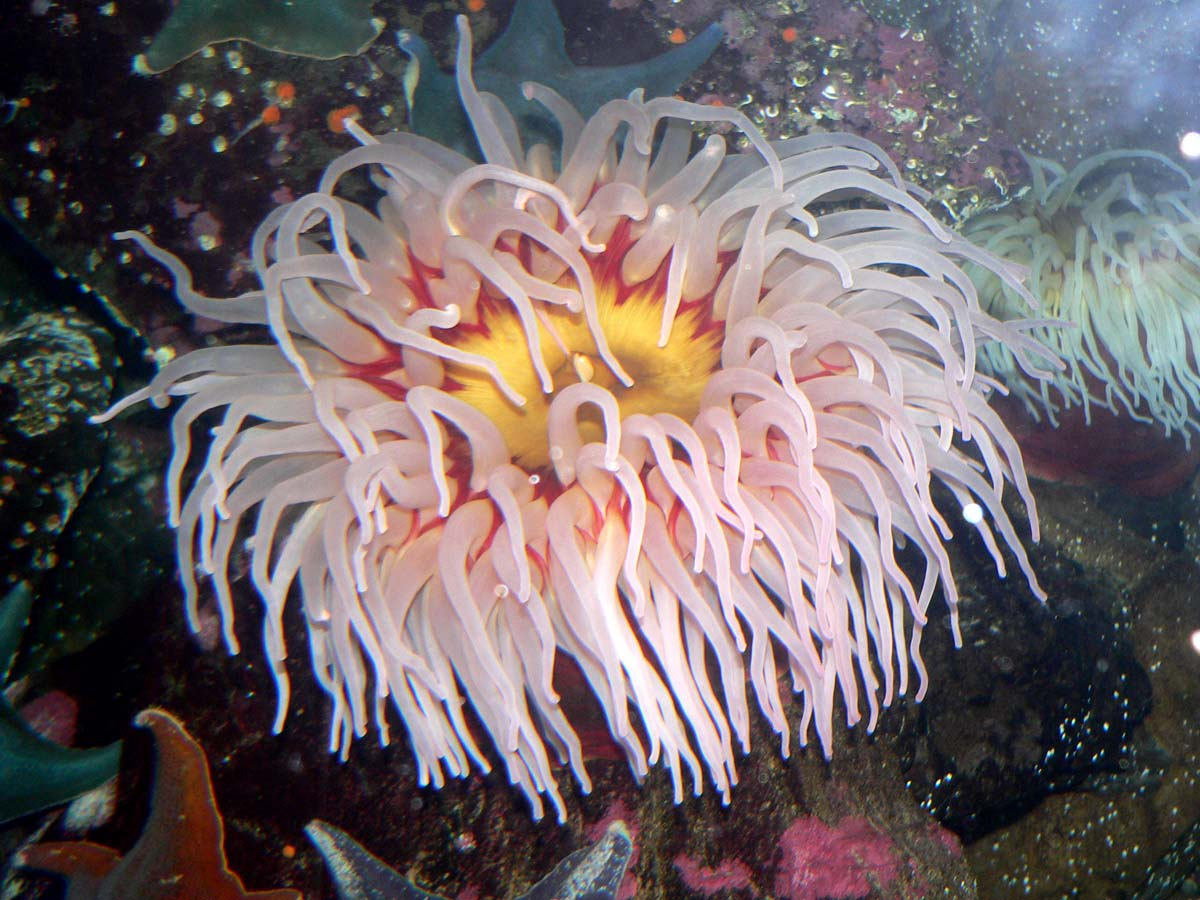
- Urticina piscivora

Scientific classification
- Kingdom: Animalia
- Phylum: Cnidaria
- Subphylum: Anthozoa
- Class: Hexacorallia
- Order: Actiniaria
- Family: Actiniidae
- Genus: Urticina; Ehrenberg, 1834

Species
- See text

= Urticina =

Genus of sea anemones

Urticina is a genus of relatively large and often colorful sea anemones in the family Actiniidae from the North Pacific, North Atlantic and Arctic Oceans.

== Species ==
The following species are listed in the World Register of Marine Species (WoRMS):

- Urticina asiatica (Averincev, 1967)
- Urticina clandestina Sanamyan N., Sanamyan K. & McDaniel, 2013
- Urticina coccinea (Verrill, 1866)
- Urticina columbiana Verrill, 1922 – crusty red anemone, columbia sand anemone, sand anemone, and sand-rose anemone
- Urticina coriacea (Cuvier, 1798) – red beaded anemone
- Urticina crassicornis (Müller, 1776) – Christmas anemone
- Urticina eques (Gosse, 1858) – white-spotted rose anemone or strawberry anemone
- Urticina fecunda (Verill, 1899)
- Urticina felina (Linnaeus, 1761) – northern red anemone
- Urticina grebelnyi Sanamyan, N.P. & Sanamyan, K.E., 2006
- Urticina macloviana (Lesson, 1830)
- Urticina mcpeaki Hauswaldt & Pearson, 1999
- Urticina piscivora (Sebens & Laakso, 1978) – fish-eating anemone and fish-eating urticina
- Urticina timuri Sanamyan & Sanamyan, 2020
- Urticina tuberculata Cocks, 1850
