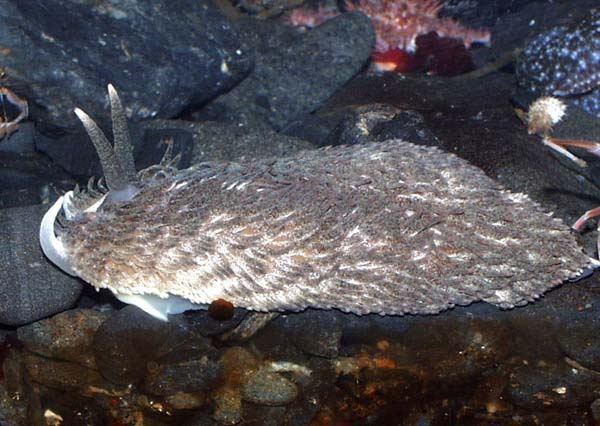

Scientific classification
- Kingdom: Animalia
- Phylum: Mollusca
- Class: Gastropoda
- Order: Nudibranchia
- Suborder: Aeolidacea
- Family: Aeolidiidae
- Genus: Aeolidia
- Species: A. papillosa

Binomial name
- Aeolidia papillosa (Linnaeus, 1761)

= Aeolidia papillosa =

Species of gastropod

Aeolidia papillosa, known as the common grey sea slug, is a species of nudibranch in the family Aeolidiidae.

== Distribution ==
This nudibranch species thrives in cold-temperate waters in the Northern Hemisphere on the Atlantic coast of The British Isles and Northern Europe, the Atlantic coast of North America, and the north Pacific Coast of North America. This species has recently been shown to have a more restricted distribution than previously thought, with animals from California, France and Chile being three other species.

== Description ==
Fig. 1 A. papillosa image/video

Aeolidia papillosa can be easily identified by its large number of cylindrical cerata covering its body except for a triangular area that extends from the rhinophores to the mid dorsum. The color is variable, usually with speckled darker markings in the head and back regions. To distinguish from different Aeolidia, A. papillosa has a distinct "V"- shaped pattern on the head of the animal that extends from one oral tentacle to its opposing pair tentacle. Adult A. papillosa reach up to 120 mm in length.

== Anatomy ==
In the order of Nudibranchia, these 'sea slugs' are not considered marine worms but instead mollusks who lack a shell which is a main characteristic in classification. Nudibranchia exhibit bilateral symmetry in overall body structure as well as in gill feature.

=== Orientation and outer body plan ===
Since they lack an outer shell, Nudibranchia exhibit a specialized epithelium that protects them from predation and attacks from prey. Located in the epithelium are several vacuoles that aid them in secretions. The outside of the body is also covered with several cerata [singular ceras] that have numerous functions. This feature, from the Greek word "κέρας" means "horn", is often associated with the suborder aeolid nudibranch. These protrusions are filled with blood and cover the animal laterally and dorsally. Inside each ceras, there is a duct that connects to the digestive system as well as a sac called cnidosac that holds defensive stinging nematocysts it acquires from eating its prey cnidaria. The pigments of cerata are dependent on the color of the digestive gland which can change by diet in translucent species.

=== Internal organs and processes ===
Unlike other Aeolidida, the family Aeolidiidae possesses radular teeth which aid in feeding on their prey (See Fig. 2). The radula is a feature in majority of mollusks located in the mouth, like a tongue, containing thousands of teeth that help cut up food for digestion by scraping against rocks or even

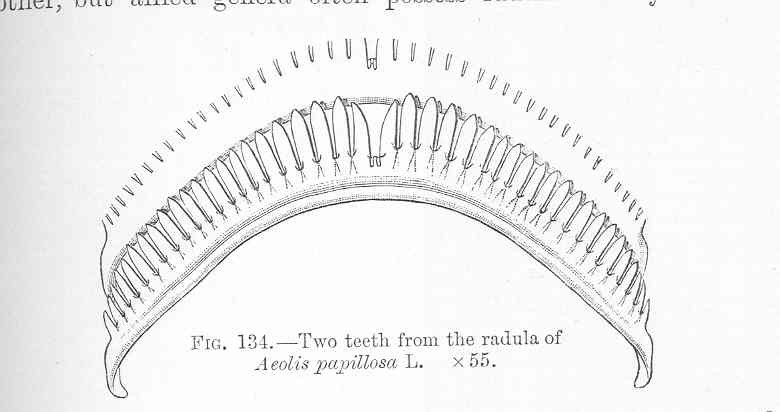
Fig. 2 A. papillosa Radular Teeth

drilling holes in prey in some species. This order is also classified by solid or circular columns of sensory tissues in the form of tentacles called rhinophores. In several groups of Nudibranchia, eyes can be located toward the bottom of these rhinophores which can entail possible homology of related ancestors. In internal organs, developing from the stomach is the intestine composing of a thick fold of tissue termed typhlosole which is plesiomorphic to Nudibranchia. In the superfamily Aeolidioidea, the typhlosole is present. The function of the typhlosole has not been determined, in some clades, it is possible that it aids in a secretion to help excretion of wastes or provides support in digestion of hard structures like sponge spicules.

== Behavior and adaptations ==
=== Food sources ===
The family Aeolidiidae, as well as other Nudibranchia families, are often studied for their adaptable defense from the stinging nematocyst discharge of Cnidarian sea anemones in particular Actinia, Anemonia, Metridium, Sagartia and Urticina. Other food sources compose of zooxanthellae dinoflagellates which live in mutualistic relationship within the Nudibranch that provide nutrition in the tissues through photosynthesis. A. papillosa participate in "ingestive conditioning" in which they consume the nematocyst from their prey in response for predators in the same environment.

=== Nematocyst utilization ===
Nematocysts are found in the epidermal mucus coat of several nudibranch families. The amount of inhibition ranges based on the different species of sea anemones preyed upon. By consuming distinct species, the outer mucous layer inhibition alters but if two separate prey species are constantly eaten, the mucous layer will inhibit for both species. Anemones are also covered with a protective mucous layer that is compositionally unique from the mucous layer that is produced by nudibranch species. The thickness of the mucous layer ranges by the different families of Nudibranchia but members of Aeolidiidae express relatively thin layers which limit the amount microvilli-like activity possible by volume.

== Reproduction ==
In the order of Nudibranchia, all experience a hermaphroditic nature with complete male and female reproductive organs. For A. papillosa, self-fertilization is rare and predominantly reproduces by means of copulation.

=== Organ arrangement ===
These sexual organs are in the form of openings located on the right side of the body. Successful impregnation occurs when the penis of one releases sperm in packets around the mate's vaginal opening which is in the shape of a cone. If sperm is not properly administered around the cone it will remain in the outside wall layer where it was penetrated for several days without correct fertilization.

=== Spawning and eggs ===
Spawning times range between January through August usually on harder substrate like rocks. This species of nudibranch shed their eggs in masses around 20 million offspring or more. Egg shape is arranged in a spiral pattern in its own capsule and color ranges from white to pink (See Fig. 1). Egg composition arranges in two equivalent layers which can be detected by electron micrographs.
