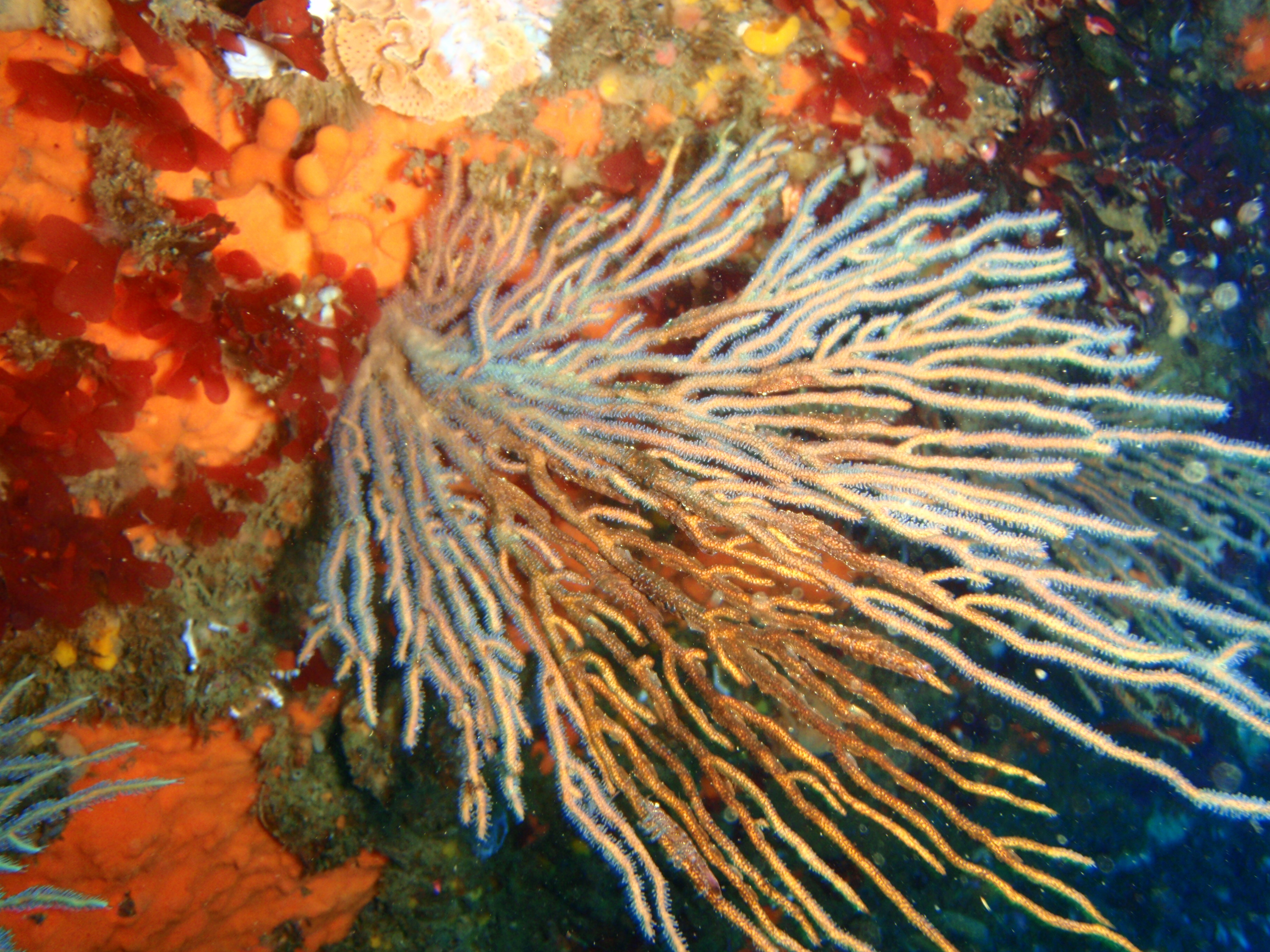
- Grey fan hydroid (Solanderia procumbens)

Scientific classification
- Kingdom: Animalia
- Phylum: Cnidaria
- Class: Hydrozoa
- Order: Anthoathecata
- Suborder: Capitata
- Family: Solanderiidae; Marshall, 1892
- Genus: Solanderia; Duchassaing & Michelin, 1846

Species
- See text

Synonyms
- Family-level: Ceratelladae Gray, 1868; Genus-level: Ceratella Gray, 1868; Chitina Carter, 1873; Dehitella Gray, 1868; Dendrocoryne Inaba, 1892; Eugemmaria Fraser, 1938; Spongiocladium Jäderholm, 1896

= Solanderia =

Genus of hydrozoans

Solanderia is the sole genus of hydrozoans in the monotypic family Solanderiidae. They are commonly known as tree hydroids or sea fan hydroids.

== Description ==
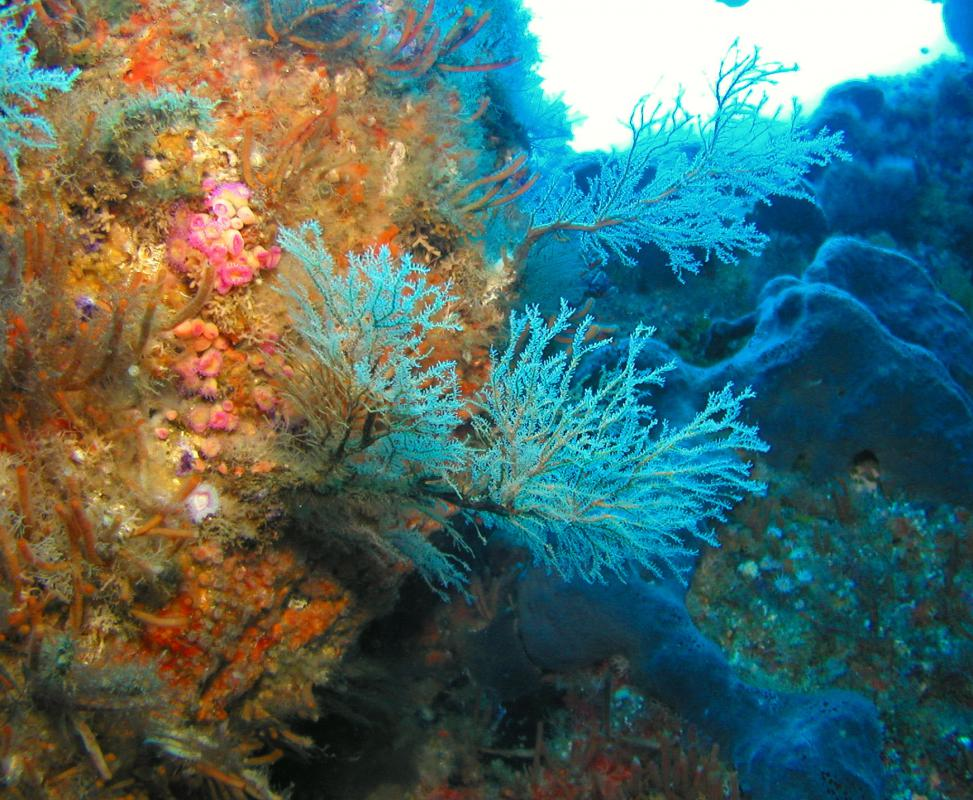
Solanderia sp. at Rakitu Island (Arid Island), Great Barrier Island, New Zealand

Solanderia hydroids forms large colonies. They are one of about 1000 species of athecate hydroids, which do not construct a skeletal covering for their polyps (as opposed to the thecate hydroids in the order Leptothecata. The chitinous skeleton is internal, branches, and may form anastomoses. The skeleton is formed by coalescence and modification of adjacent hydrocauline tubes. The coenosarc covers the entire colony and penetrates skeletal interstices. The hydranths cover the whole colony surface and are uniform in structure, cylindrical, with a single whorl of capitate tentacles around the mouth. Numerous similar tentacles are scattered over the body. Solanderia is known from its polyp or hydroid stage, and produces gonophores which release sperm and eggs for reproduction. Where known, the gonophores are cryptomedusoid or eumedusoid, arising directly from the coenosarc.

== Ecology ==
Species of Solanderia are eaten by nudibranchs in the genus Jason, Hermosita, and the family Pleurolidiidae.

== Species ==
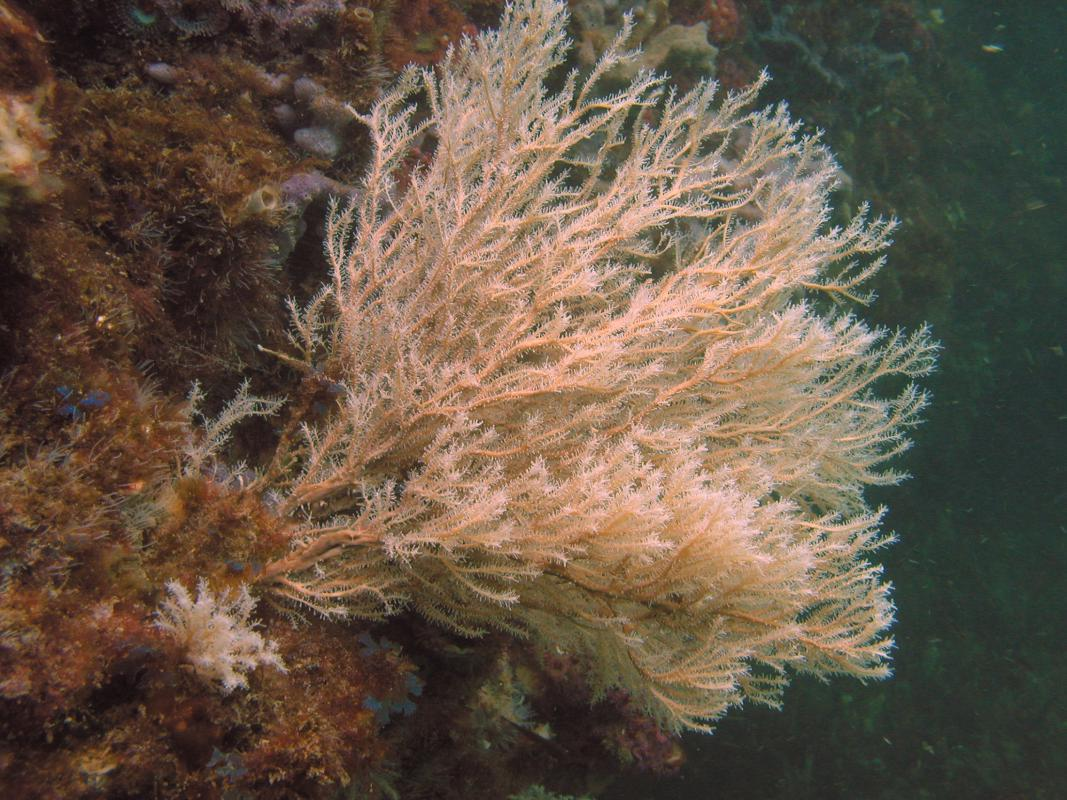
Solanderia sp. Houhora Harbour, Northland, New Zealand

Solanderia contains the following species:

- Solanderia dendritica (Fraser, 1938)
- Solanderia ericopsis (Carter, 1873)
- Solanderia fusca (Gray, 1868)
- Solanderia gracilis Duchassaing & Michelin, 1846
- Solanderia misakinensis (Inaba, 1892)
- Solanderia procumbens (Carter, 1873)
- Solanderia secunda (Inaba, 1892)

Species brought into synonymy

- Solanderia atrorubens (Gray, 1868): synonym of Solanderia fusca (Gray, 1868)
- Solanderia minima (Hickson, 1903): synonym of Solanderia secunda (Inaba, 1892)
- Solanderia misakiensis (Inaba, 1892): synonym of Solanderia misakinensis (Inaba, 1892)
- Solanderia rufescens Jäderholm, 1896: synonym of Solanderia secunda (Inaba, 1892)
