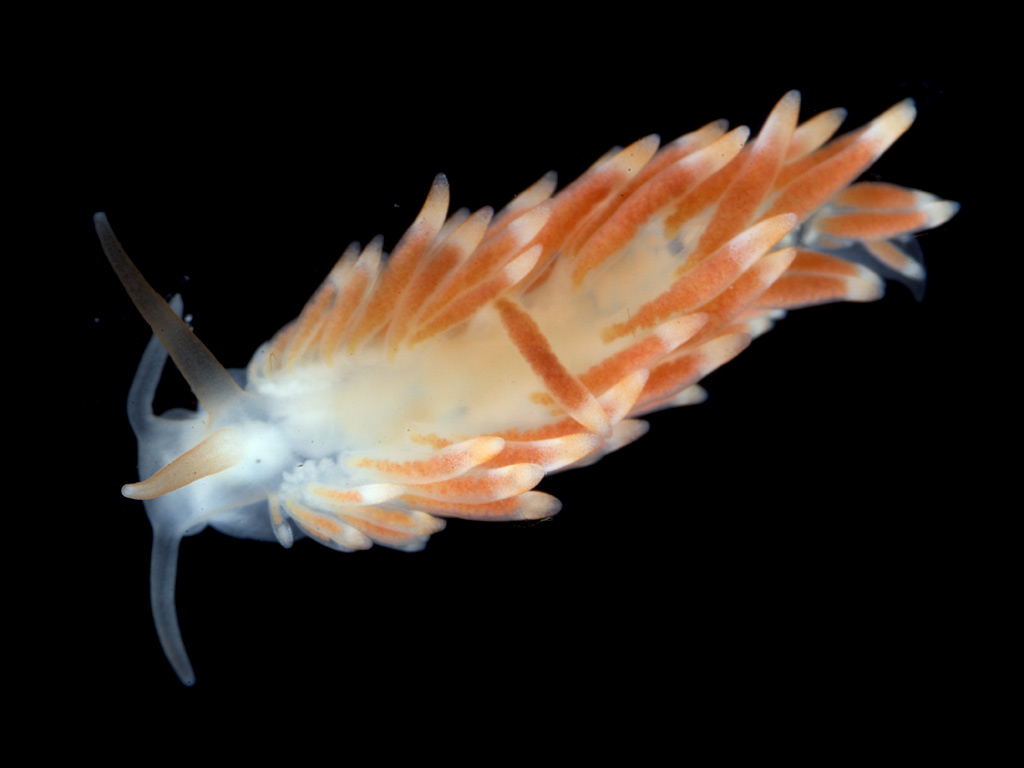
- Catriona aurantia

Scientific classification
- Kingdom: Animalia
- Phylum: Mollusca
- Class: Gastropoda
- Order: Nudibranchia
- Suborder: Aeolidacea
- Family: Trinchesiidae
- Genus: Catriona; Winckworth, 1941

Type species
- Eolis aurantia Alder & Hancock, 1842

= Catriona (gastropod) =

Genus of gastropods

Catriona is a genus of sea slugs, aeolid nudibranchs, marine gastropod molluscs in the family Trinchesiidae. All species were transferred to Tenellia as a result of a DNA phylogeny study in 2016. It was reinstated in 2017, and once again in 2025, on the basis of DNA and morphological criteria.

== Species ==
According to Korshunova et al. (2025), within the genus Catriona include:

- Catriona alpha (Baba & Hamatani, 1963)
- Catriona aurantia (Alder & Hancock, 1842) - type species of Catriona
- Catriona casha Gosliner & R. J. Griffiths, 1981
- Catriona columbiana (O'Donoghue, 1922) - British Columbia aeolid
- Catriona gymnota (Couthouy, 1838)
- Catriona kishiwadensis (Martynov, Korshunova, Lundin & Malmberg, 2022)
- Catriona lonca (Er. Marcus, 1965)
- Catriona lucerna (Korshunova, Martynov, Lundin & Malmberg, 2022)
- Catriona maua (Er. Marcus & Ev. Marcus, 1960)
- Catriona oba (Ev. Marcus, 1970)
- Catriona osezakiensis (Martynov, Korshunova, Lundin & Malmberg, 2022)
- Catriona rickettsi (Behrens, 1984) - Doc's aeolid
- Catriona ronga (Er. Marcus, 1961)
- Catriona spadix (MacFarland, 1966)
- Catriona susa (Ev. Marcus & Er. Marcus, 1960)
- Catriona tema (Edmunds, 1968)
- Catriona urquisa (Er. Marcus, 1965)
- Catriona venusta (Baba, 1949)

Species names currently considered to be synonyms:

- Catriona anulata (Baba, 1949): synonym of Trinchesia anulata (Baba, 1949)
- Catriona beta (Baba & Abe 1964): synonym of Tenellia beta (Baba & Abe 1964)
- Catriona catachroma (Burn, 1963) synonym of Trinchesia catachroma (Burn, 1963)
- Catriona nigricolora (Baba, 1955): synonym of Trinchesia nigricolora
- Catriona ornata (Baba, 1937): synonym of Trinchesia ornata (Baba, 1937)
- Catriona perca (Marcus Er., 1958) synonym of Trinchesia perca (Er. Marcus, 1958)
- Catriona pinnifera (Baba, 1949): synonym of Trinchesia pinnifera
- Catriona puellula (Baba, 1955): synonym of Trinchesia puellula (Baba, 1955)
- Catriona pupillae Baba, 1961 synonym of Trinchesia pupillae (Baba, 1961)
- Catriona signifera (Baba, 1961): synonym of Trinchesia signifera
- Catriona viridiana (Burn, 1962) synonym of Trinchesia viridiana (Burn, 1962)
