= Cavolinia =

Cavolinia may refer to:

- Cavolinia (gastropod) Abildgaard, 1791, a genus of gastropods in the family Cavoliniidae
- Cavolinia Bruguière, 1791, a genus of gastropods in the family Facelinidae, synonym of Cratena
- Cavolinia, a genus of cnidarians in the family Sphenophidae, synonym of Palythoa
