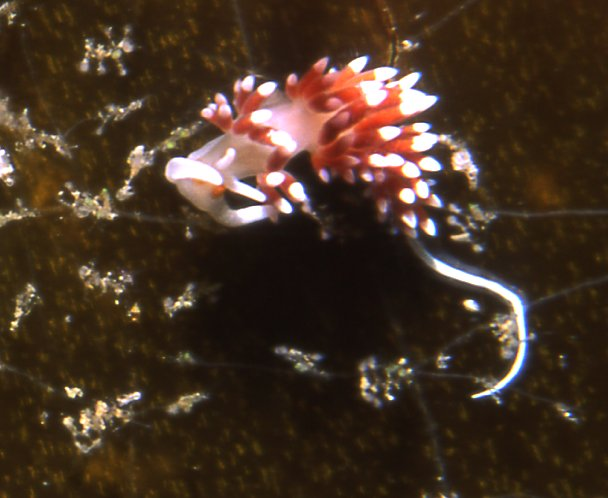
- Cratena capensis

Scientific classification
- Kingdom: Animalia
- Phylum: Mollusca
- Class: Gastropoda
- Order: Nudibranchia
- Suborder: Aeolidacea
- Family: Facelinidae
- Genus: Cratena; Bergh, 1864

Type species
- Doris peregrina Gmelin, 1791

Synonyms
- Rizzolia Trinchese, 1877

= Cratena =

Genus of gastropods

Cratena is a genus of sea slugs, aeolid nudibranchs, marine gastropod molluscs in the family Facelinidae.

Cratena is the type genus of the subfamily Crateninae.

== Species ==
Species within the genus Cratena include:

- Cratena affinis (Baba, 1949)
- Cratena capensis Barnard, 1927 - orange-eyed nudibranch
- Cratena lineata Eliot, 1905
- Cratena minor Padula, Araújo, Matthews-Cascon & Schrödl, 2014
- Cratena pawarshindeorum Bharate, Padula, Apte & Shimpi, 2020
- Cratena peregrina (Gmelin, 1791)
- Cratena pilata (Gould, 1870)
- Cratena poshitraensis Bharate, Padula, Apte & Shimpi, 2020
- Cratena scintilla Ortea & Moro, 1998
- Cratena simba Edmunds, 1970
- Cratena tema Edmunds, 2015

Taxa inquirenda

- Cratena cornuta (Risbec, 1928)
- Cratena diffusa (Risbec, 1928)
- Cratena grisea (Risbec, 1928)

Species brought into synonymy

- Cratena anulata Baba, 1949: synonym of Cuthona anulata (Baba, 1949)
- Cratena cavanca Bergh, 1898: synonym of Phidiana lottini (Lesson, 1831)
- Cratena exigua Thiele, 1912: synonym of Cuthona georgiana (Pfeffer in Martens & Pfeffer, 1886)
- Cratena fructuosa Bergh, 1892: synonym of Cuthona fructuosa (Bergh, 1892)
- Cratena genovae O'Donoghue, 1929: synonym of Cuthona genovae (O'Donoghue, 1929)
- Cratena gymnota (Couthouy, 1838): synonym of Cuthona gymnota (Couthouy, 1838)
- Cratena hirsuta Bergh, 1864: synonym of Cuthona nana (Alder & Hancock, 1842)
- Cratena kaoruae Marcus, 1957: synonym of Cratena pilata (Gould, 1870)
- Cratena lugubris Bergh, 1870: synonym of Phestilla lugubris (Bergh, 1870)
- Cratena macphersonae Burn, 1962: synonym of Phyllodesmium macphersonae (Burn, 1962)
- Cratena nigricolora Baba, 1955: synonym of Catriona nigricolora (Baba, 1955)
- Cratena pinnifera Baba, 1949: synonym of Catriona pinnifera (Baba, 1949)
- Cratena piutaensis Ortea, Caballer & Espinosa, 2003: synonym of Anetarca piutaensis (Ortea, Caballer & Espinosa, 2003)
- Cratena puellula Baba, 1955: synonym of Cuthona puellula (Baba, 1955)
- Cratena pusilla Bergh, 1898: synonym of Cuthona pusilla (Bergh, 1898)
- Cratena valentini Eliot, 1907: synonym of Cuthona valentini (Eliot, 1907)
- Cratena venusta Baba, 1949: synonym of Catriona venusta (Baba, 1949)
- Cratena veronicae A. E. Verrill, 1880: synonym of Cuthona veronicae (A. E. Verrill, 1880)
- Cratena vittata (Alder & Hancock, 1842): synonym of Eubranchus vittatus (Alder & Hancock, 1842)
- Cratena yatsui Baba, 1930: synonym of Herviella yatsui (Baba, 1930)
