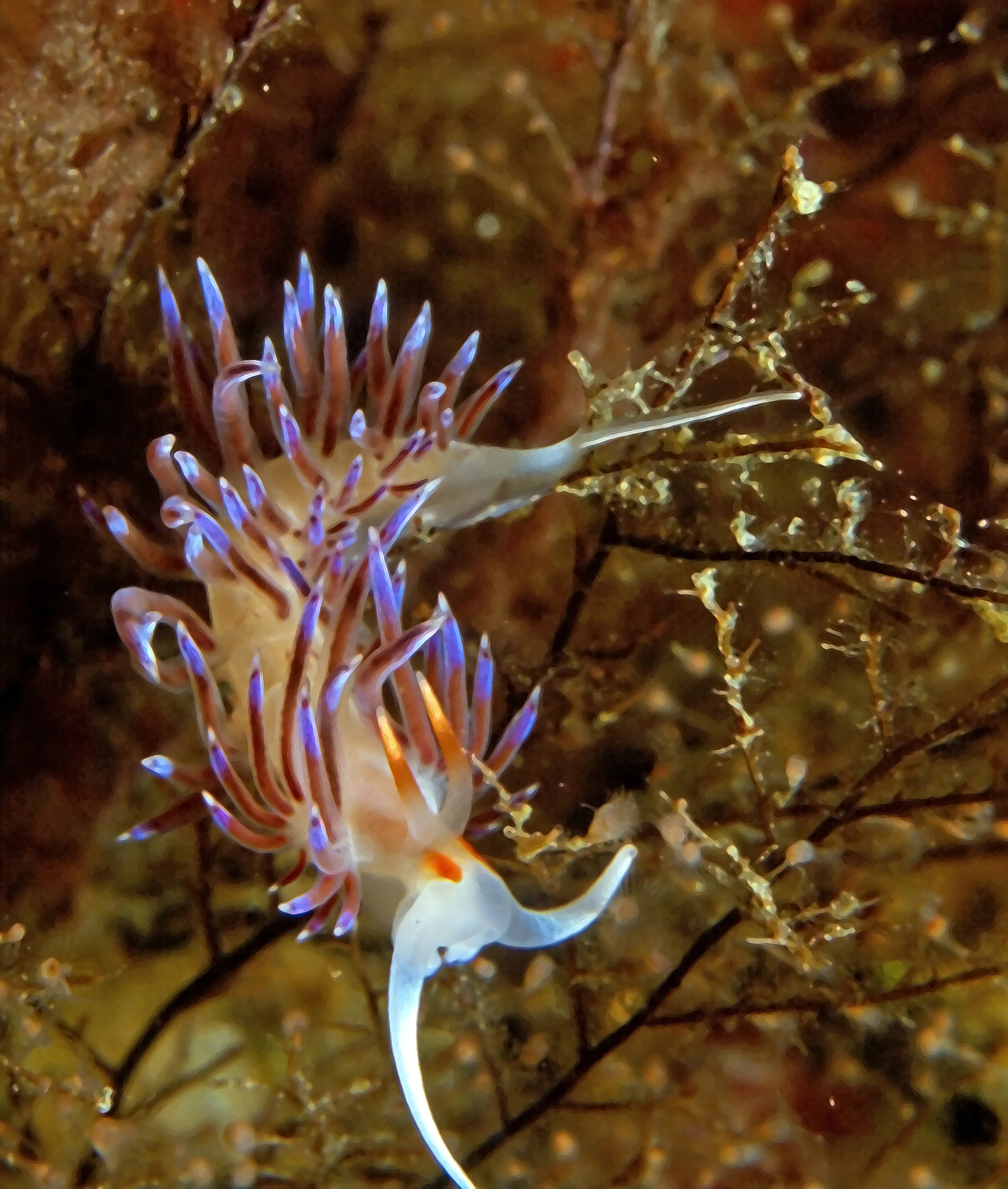

Scientific classification
- Kingdom: Animalia
- Phylum: Mollusca
- Class: Gastropoda
- Order: Nudibranchia
- Suborder: Aeolidacea
- Family: Facelinidae
- Genus: Cratena
- Species: C. peregrina

Binomial name
- Cratena peregrina (Gmelin, 1791)

Synonyms
- Cuthona peregrina (Gmelin, 1791); Doris peregrina Gmelin, 1791 (original combination); Hervia costai Haefelfinger, 1961 (synonym)

= Cratena peregrina =

Species of gastropod

Cratena peregrina, commonly called the pilgrim hervia, is a species of sea slug, an aeolid nudibranch, a marine gastropod mollusc in the family Facelinidae.

== Description ==
The pilgrim hervia is an aeolid sea slug, its average size is between 3 and 5 cm. The body is thin and slender, with a long sharply pointed tail. Its body coloration is milky white with 8 to 10 clusters of dorsal cerata which can be bright red, purple, brown or blue, with the tips coloured in luminescent blue. Those cerata act like gills, and each one contains a terminal outgrowth of the digestive gland, a diverticulum.

The head, which is the same colour as the body, has a pair of bright orange rhinophores, and with two whitish long buccal tentacles, which look like horns.

== Distribution and habitat ==
This species occurs in the Mediterranean Sea and in the eastern Atlantic Ocean from the Channel south to Senegal. This sea slug prefers to live on rocky bottoms and slopes in clear and well-oxygenated water, between 5 and 50 m in depth.

== Biology ==
The pilgrim hervia feeds on hydroids in the genus Eudendrium.

Kleptopredation.
