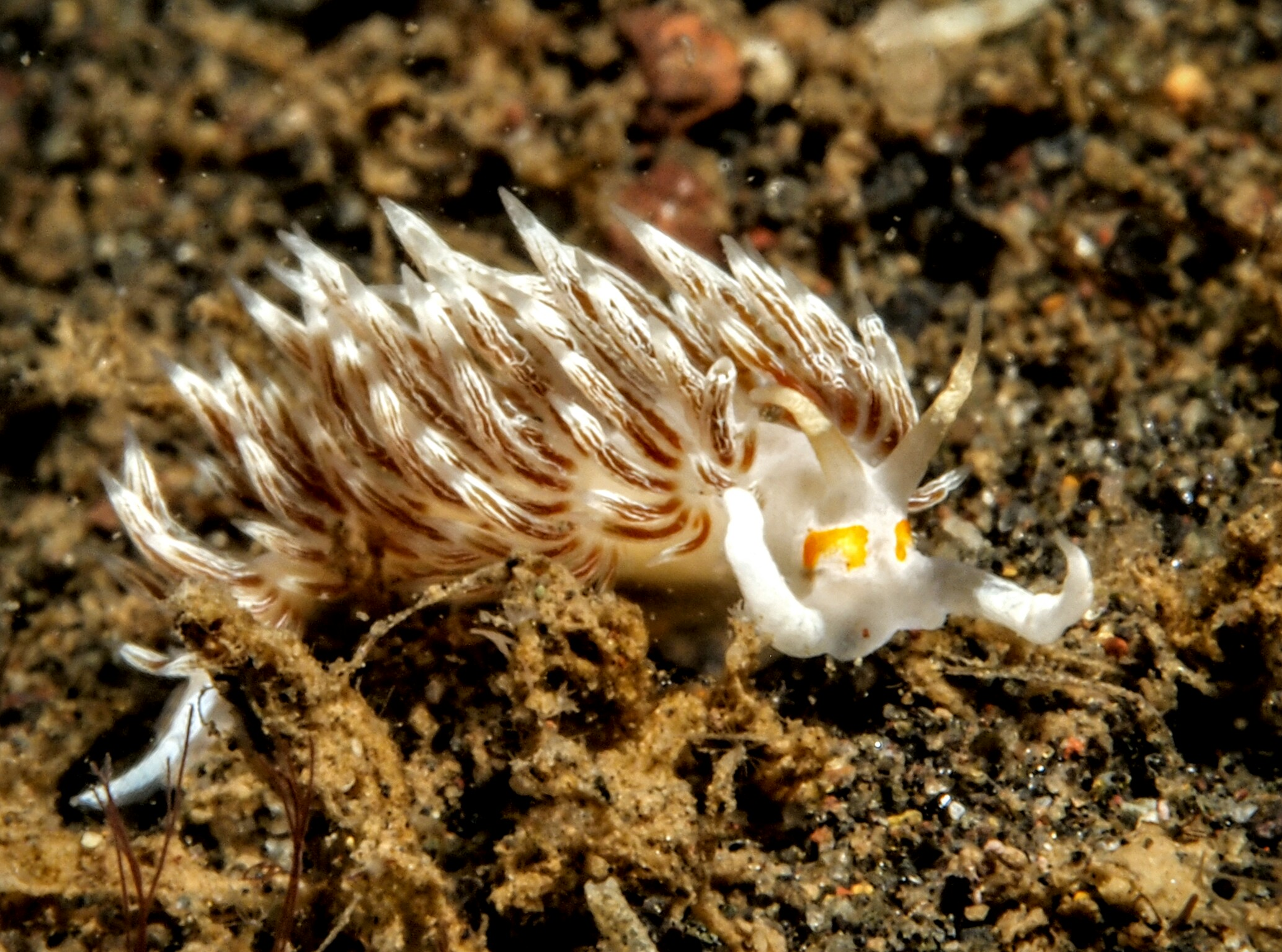
- Cratena lineata, Bali, Indonesia

Scientific classification
- Kingdom: Animalia
- Phylum: Mollusca
- Class: Gastropoda
- Order: Nudibranchia
- Suborder: Aeolidacea
- Family: Facelinidae
- Genus: Cratena
- Species: C. lineata

Binomial name
- Cratena lineata (Eliot, 1905)

Synonyms
- Facelina lineata Eliot, 1905

= Cratena lineata =

Species of gastropod

Cratena lineata is a species of sea slug, an aeolid nudibranch, a marine gastropod mollusc in the family Facelinidae.

== Distribution ==
This species was described from Zanzibar. It has been reported from widespread localities throughout the Indo-Pacific Oceans.
