= Cratena tema =

Scientific classification
- Kingdom: Animalia
- Phylum: Mollusca
- Class: Gastropoda
- Order: Nudibranchia
- Suborder: Aeolidacea
- Family: Facelinidae
- Genus: Cratena
- Species: C. tema

Binomial name
- Cratena tema Edmunds, 2015

Species of gastropod

Cratena tema is a species of sea slug, an aeolid nudibranch, a marine gastropod mollusc in the family Facelinidae.

== Distribution ==
This species was described from Ghana.
