= Diacria trispinosa =

Scientific classification
- Domain: Eukaryota
- Kingdom: Animalia
- Phylum: Mollusca
- Class: Gastropoda
- Clade: Euopisthobranchia
- Order: Pteropoda
- Family: Cavoliniidae
- Genus: Diacria
- Species: D. trispinosa

Binomial name
- Diacria trispinosa (Blainville, 1821)

Species of gastropod

Diacria trispinosa is a holoplanktonic species of gastropods belonging to the family Cavoliniidae. It is classified as a mesoplankton. It is a pteropod.

The species has cosmopolitan distribution.

== Description ==
D. trispinosa is a deepwater zooplankton. Shell lengths range from 4–6 mm, occasionally reaching 7mm.

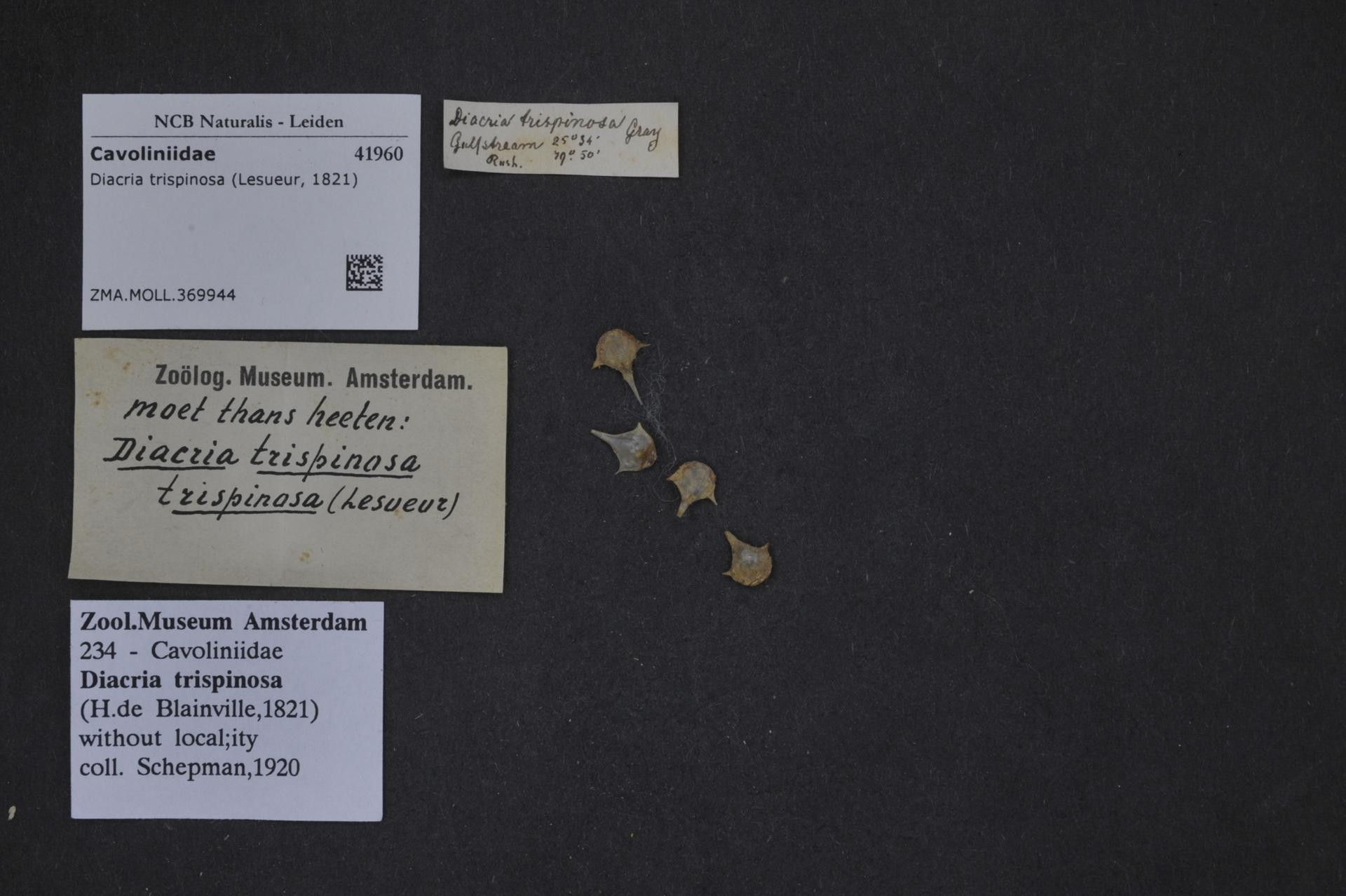
Exhibit at the Zoological Museum of Amsterdam

== Life History ==
All members of the genus Diacria share some parts of their ontogeny. They hatch with a protoconch, and develop a second one in their first days. The teleoconch, or whorls of the shell develop after about a week. As the larva grows into its adult stage it moves into the teleoconch, then a membrane is formed between the two and the protoconch is shed. Then the spots begin to develop: first light brown and red, then they spread and become darker.

In D. trispinosa specifically, each spot in the center splits into two lateral spots as it develops, then the spots spread outwards. Adult individuals of D. trispinosa have thicker shells than juveniles.

== Distribution ==
D. trispinosa has been recorded frequently off the coasts of Australia and Southeast Asia, as well as the North American east coast in the Acadian and Virginian subprovinces. Fossils of D. trispinosa have been found in the Hopegate Formation in Jamaica from as early as the Upper Pliocene. Remains have been found from as early as the Cretaceous period, although their shells are often not fully preserved due to their proclivity to dissolve in aragonite.

D. trispinosa likely has a range of 30°N to 30°S, narrower than some other members of its genus. They exhibit a vertical migration pattern, and are found in shallower waters during the night than during the day. This is an opposition to a similar species, D. major, which for a time was thought to be a subspecies or variety of D. trispinoa.
