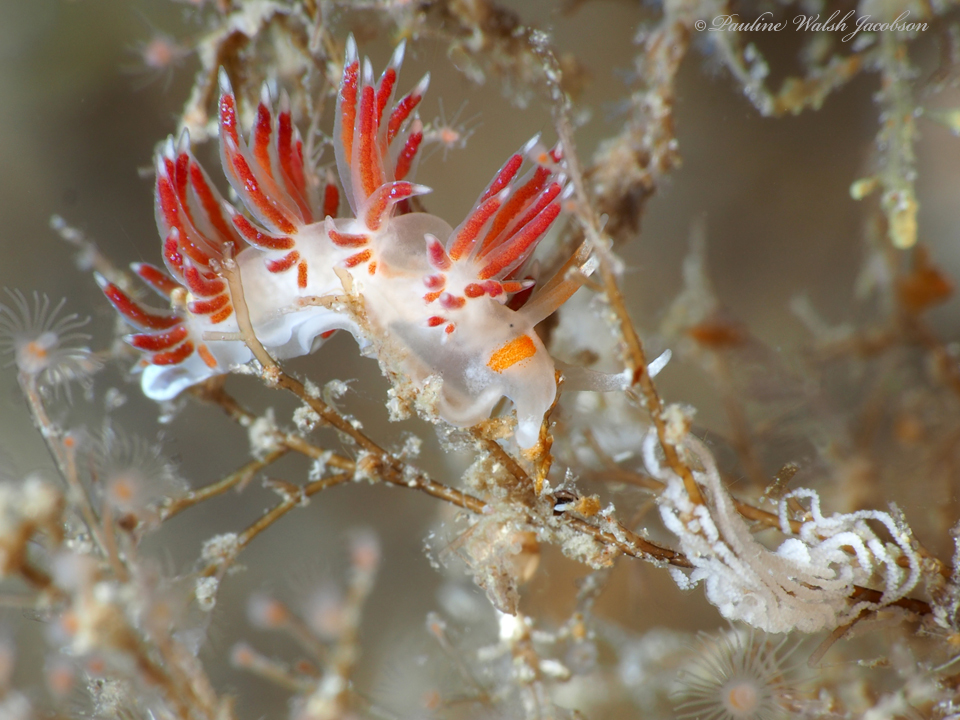

Scientific classification
- Kingdom: Animalia
- Phylum: Mollusca
- Class: Gastropoda
- Order: Nudibranchia
- Suborder: Aeolidacea
- Family: Facelinidae
- Genus: Cratena
- Species: C. minor

Binomial name
- Cratena minor Padula, Araújo, Matthews-Cascon & Schrödl, 2014

= Cratena minor =

Species of gastropod

Cratena minor is a species of sea slug, an aeolid nudibranch, a marine gastropod mollusc in the family Facelinidae.

== Distribution ==
This species was described from Brazil.
