= Catriona gymnota =

Scientific classification
- Kingdom: Animalia
- Phylum: Mollusca
- Class: Gastropoda
- Order: Nudibranchia
- Suborder: Aeolidacea
- Family: Trinchesiidae
- Genus: Catriona
- Species: C. gymnota

Binomial name
- Catriona gymnota (Couthouy, 1838)

Synonyms
- Tenellia gymnota Couthouy, 1838; Cratena gymnota Couthouy, 1838; Cuthona gymnota Couthouy, 1838; Eolis gymnota Couthouy, 1838; Eolis sanguifera Dalyell, 1853; Montagua gouldi Verrill, 1874

Species of gastropod

Catriona gymnota is a species of sea slug, an aeolid nudibranch, a marine gastropod mollusk in the family Trinchesiidae.

== Distribution ==
This species was described from Massachusetts Bay, on the Atlantic Ocean coast of the US. It is reported from the NW Atlantic from Canada to New Jersey. DNA evidence suggests that the NE Atlantic specimens previously thought to be this species actually belong to a separate species and should therefore be called Catriona aurantia.

== Description ==
This species has a translucent white body and slightly swollen cerata. The digestive gland is orange pink in colour and the tips of the cerata have a broad white band of tiny epidermal glands. In larger specimens the rhinophores develop a pale orange suffusion. The foot is broad and rounded anteriorly. Large individuals may exceed 20 mm in length.
