= Catriona alpha =

Scientific classification
- Kingdom: Animalia
- Phylum: Mollusca
- Class: Gastropoda
- Order: Nudibranchia
- Suborder: Aeolidacea
- Family: Trinchesiidae
- Genus: Catriona
- Species: C. alpha

Binomial name
- Catriona alpha Baba & Hamatani, 1963

Synonyms
- Cuthona alpha Baba & Hamatani, 1963 (original combination); Trinchesia alpha Baba & Hamatani, 1963

Species of gastropod

Catriona alpha is a species of sea slug, an aeolid nudibranch, a marine gastropod mollusc in the family Trinchesiidae.

== Distribution ==
This species was described from the shore of Kozuchi-jima near the Tamano Marine Laboratory, Tamano, Inland Sea of Seto, Japan; it also occurs off New Zealand.

== Description ==
The typical adult size of this species is 13–15 mm.
