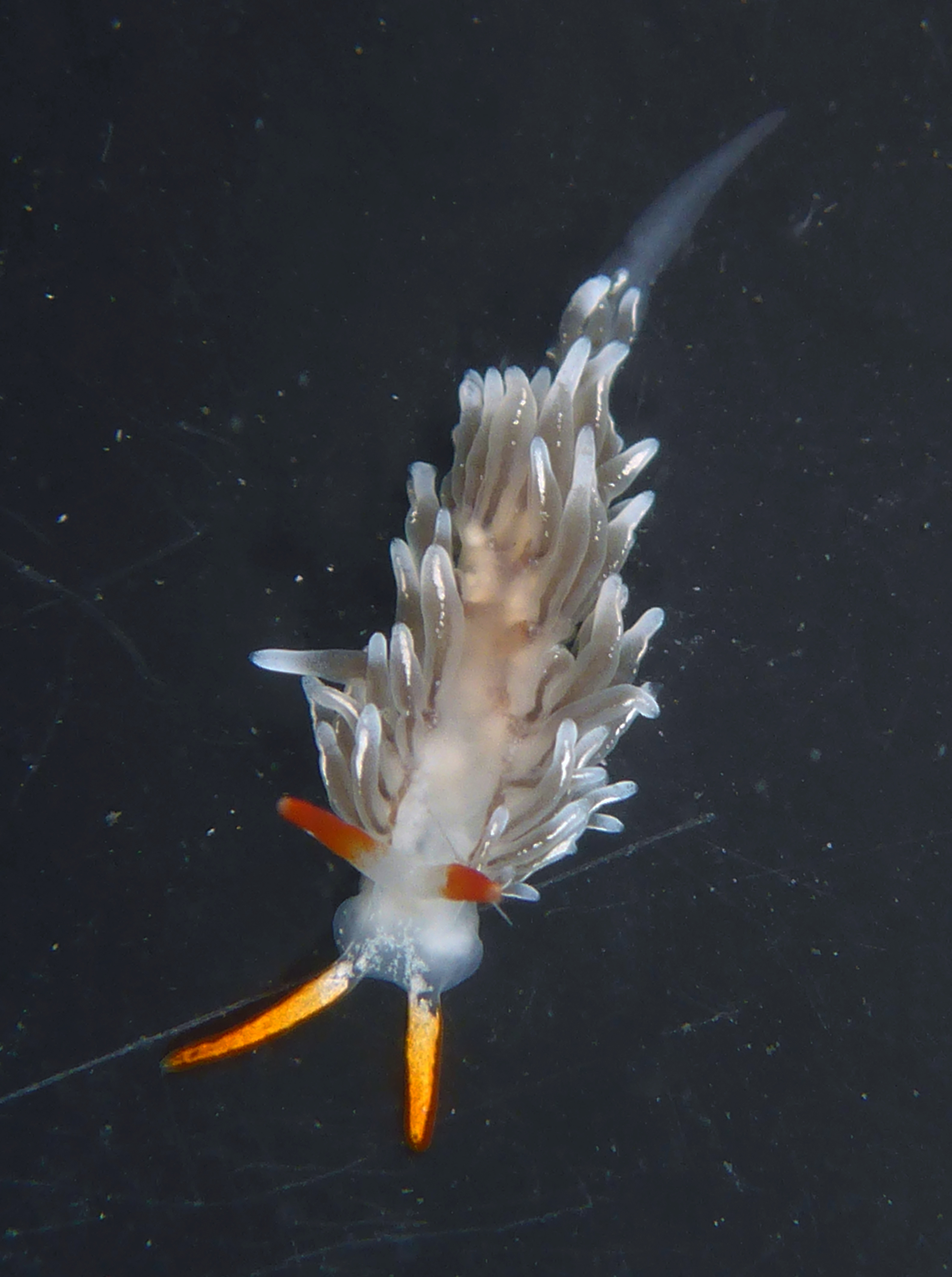
- Santa Cruz, California

Scientific classification
- Kingdom: Animalia
- Phylum: Mollusca
- Class: Gastropoda
- Order: Nudibranchia
- Suborder: Aeolidacea
- Family: Trinchesiidae
- Genus: Catriona
- Species: C. columbiana

Binomial name
- Catriona columbiana (O'Donoghue, 1922)

Synonyms
- Amphorina columbiana (O'Donoghue, 1922); Cuthona columbiana (O'Donoghue, 1922); Tenellia columbiana (O'Donoghue, 1922)

= Catriona columbiana =

Species of gastropod

Catriona columbiana, the British Columbia aeolid, is a species of sea slug, an aeolid nudibranch, a marine gastropod mollusc in the family Trinchesiidae.

== Distribution ==
This species was described from Gabriola Pass, Nanaimo, Vancouver Island, British Columbia, Canada. has been recorded along the Eastern Pacific coastline of North America from Cutter Rock, Ketchikan, Alaska, to San Diego, California.

== Ecology ==
Catriona columbiana feeds on the athecate hydroids Tubularia and Syncoryne.
