= Catriona urquisa =

Scientific classification
- Kingdom: Animalia
- Phylum: Mollusca
- Class: Gastropoda
- Order: Nudibranchia
- Suborder: Aeolidacea
- Family: Trinchesiidae
- Genus: Catriona
- Species: C. urquisa

Binomial name
- Catriona urquisa Marcus, Er. 1965

Species of gastropod

Catriona urquisa is a species of sea slug, an aeolid nudibranch, a marine gastropod mollusk in the family Trinchesiidae.

== Distribution ==
This species was described from Ifaluk Atoll, Caroline Islands.
