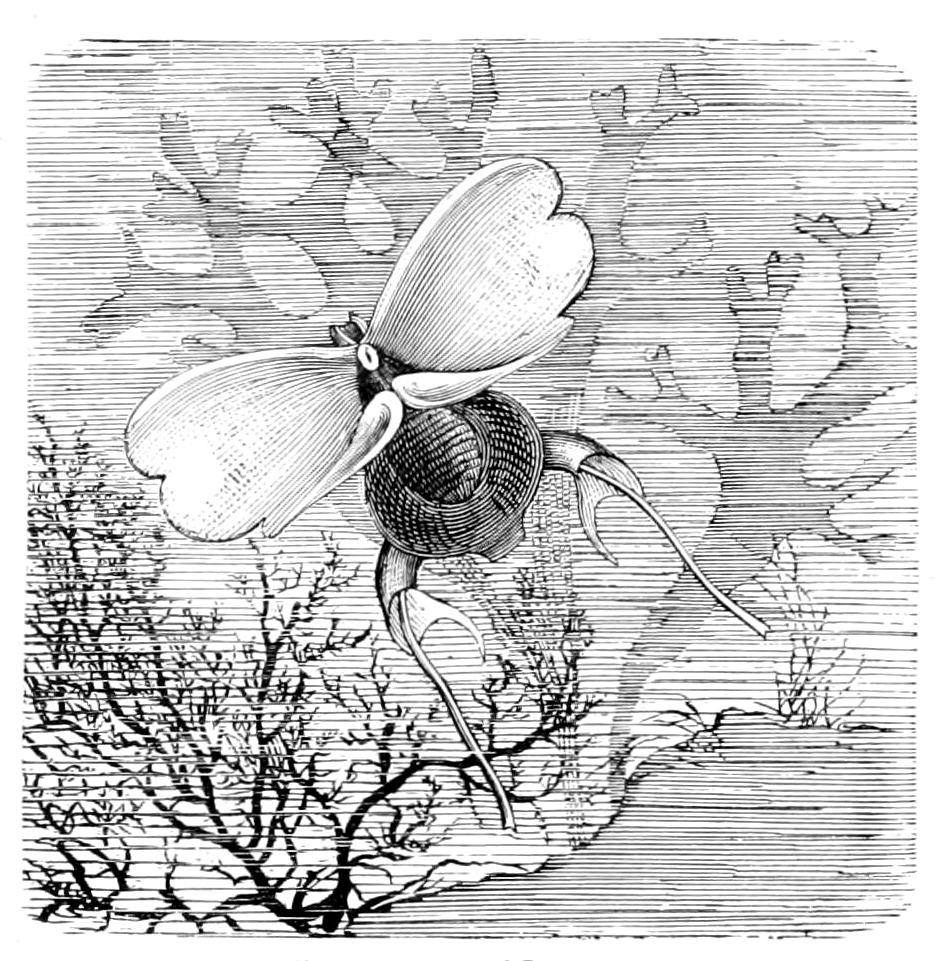

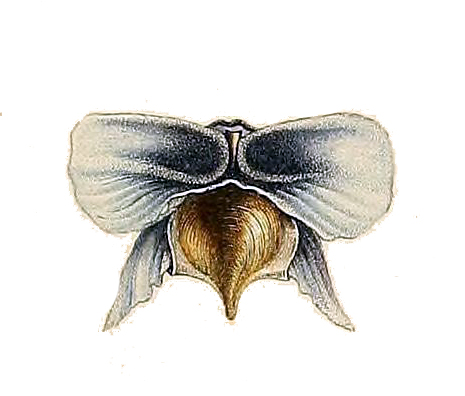

Scientific classification
- Kingdom: Animalia
- Phylum: Mollusca
- Class: Gastropoda
- Clade: Euopisthobranchia
- Order: Pteropoda
- Family: Cavoliniidae
- Genus: Cavolinia
- Species: C. tridentata

Binomial name
- Cavolinia tridentata (Forskål, 1775)

Synonyms
- Anomia tridentata Forskål, 1775 (basionym); Cavolinia natans Abildgaard, 1791; Cleodora trifilis Troschel, 1854

= Cavolinia tridentata =

Species of gastropod

Cavolinia tridentata is a species of sea butterflies, floating and swimming sea snails or sea slugs, pelagic marine gastropod molluscs in the family Cavoliniidae. It is a common species and is widespread, being found in European waters, the Atlantic Ocean, the Caribbean Sea, the Gulf of Mexico, the Indian Ocean and in the Pacific Ocean. It lives in the photic zone of the ocean between 0 and 30 m in depth.

== Taxonomy ==
Cavolinia tridentata (Forskål, 1775) was originally described as Anomia tridentata by the Finnish Peter Forsskål in 1775, based on specimens he collected in the Mediterranean Sea as part of the Danish Arabia expedition. In 1791, Danish scientist Peter Christian Abildgaard described the genus Cavolina Abildgaard and included Anomia tridentata in it (as Cavolina natans Abildgaard). A number of other synonyms in the genera Cavolinia, Cleodora and Hyalaea, as well as several forms of this species, have been described.

== Description ==

The maximum recorded shell length is 20 mm.

This species has a large, spherical and brownish shell that is up to 14 mm high, with short lateral spines that are curved downward, a well-separated dorsal apertural lip, and a partially swollen ventral shell. Near the curved apertural margin there are clear transverse striae. The protoconch on the apical spine is straight and pointed.

== Distribution ==
This marine species is common, with a wide distribution from 43°N (or even ~50°N, and occasionally as far north as 67°N) to 46°S, and from 97°W to 0°W, from Newfoundland to the Gulf of Mexico. This distribution includes European waters, the Mediterranean Sea, the Atlantic Ocean (Azores, Cape Verde), the Northwest Atlantic (Gulf of Maine), Caribbean Sea, the Gulf of Mexico, the Lesser Antilles, Indian Ocean (Mascarene Basin), the Indo-Pacific and off New Zealand

== Habitat ==
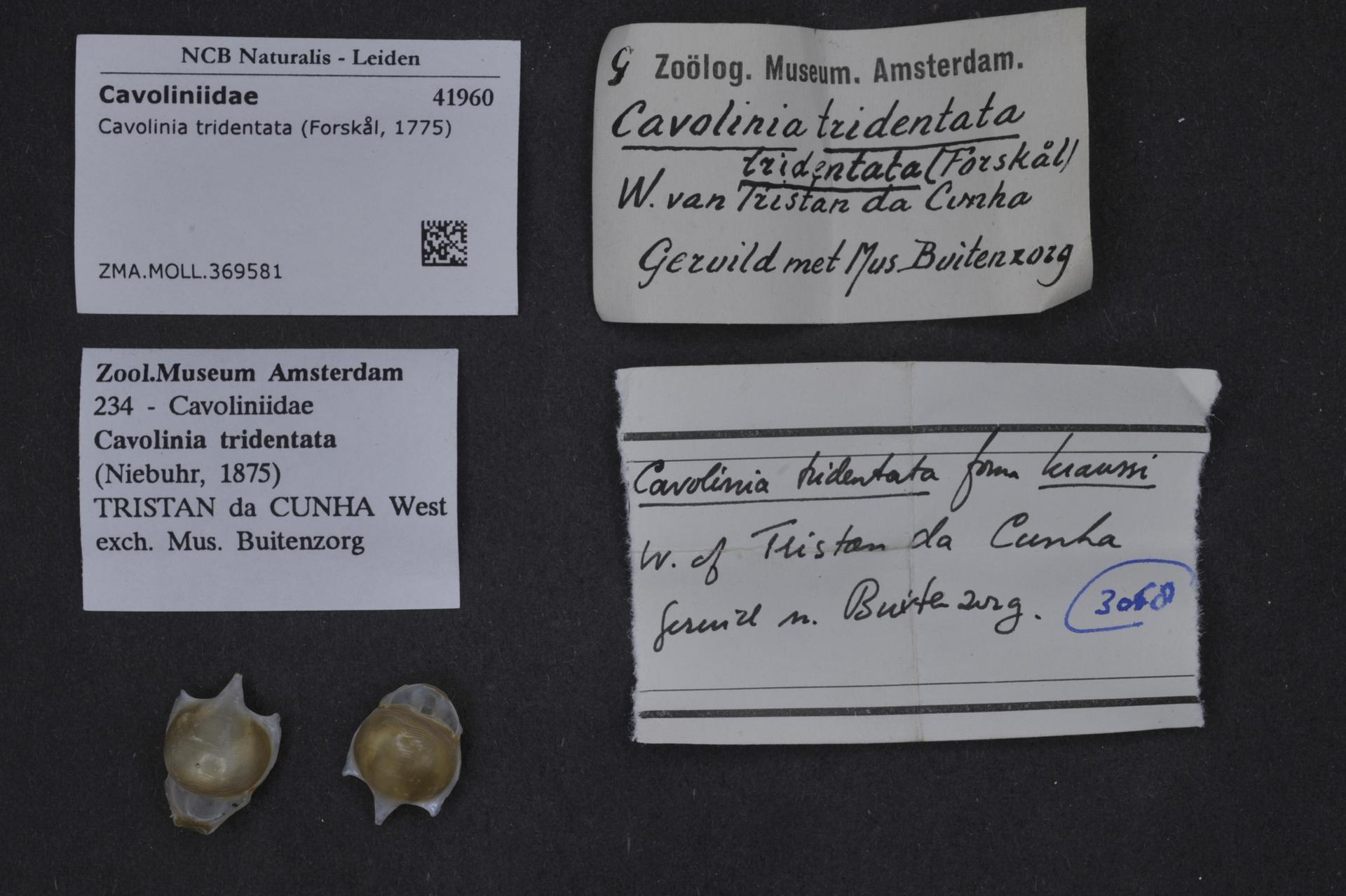
Cavolinia tridentata (Forsskål, 1775), museum specimens

The species is epipelagic, living in the uppermost layer of ocean between 0 and 30 m. Its minimum recorded depth is 0 m and its maximum recorded depth is 4791 m.
