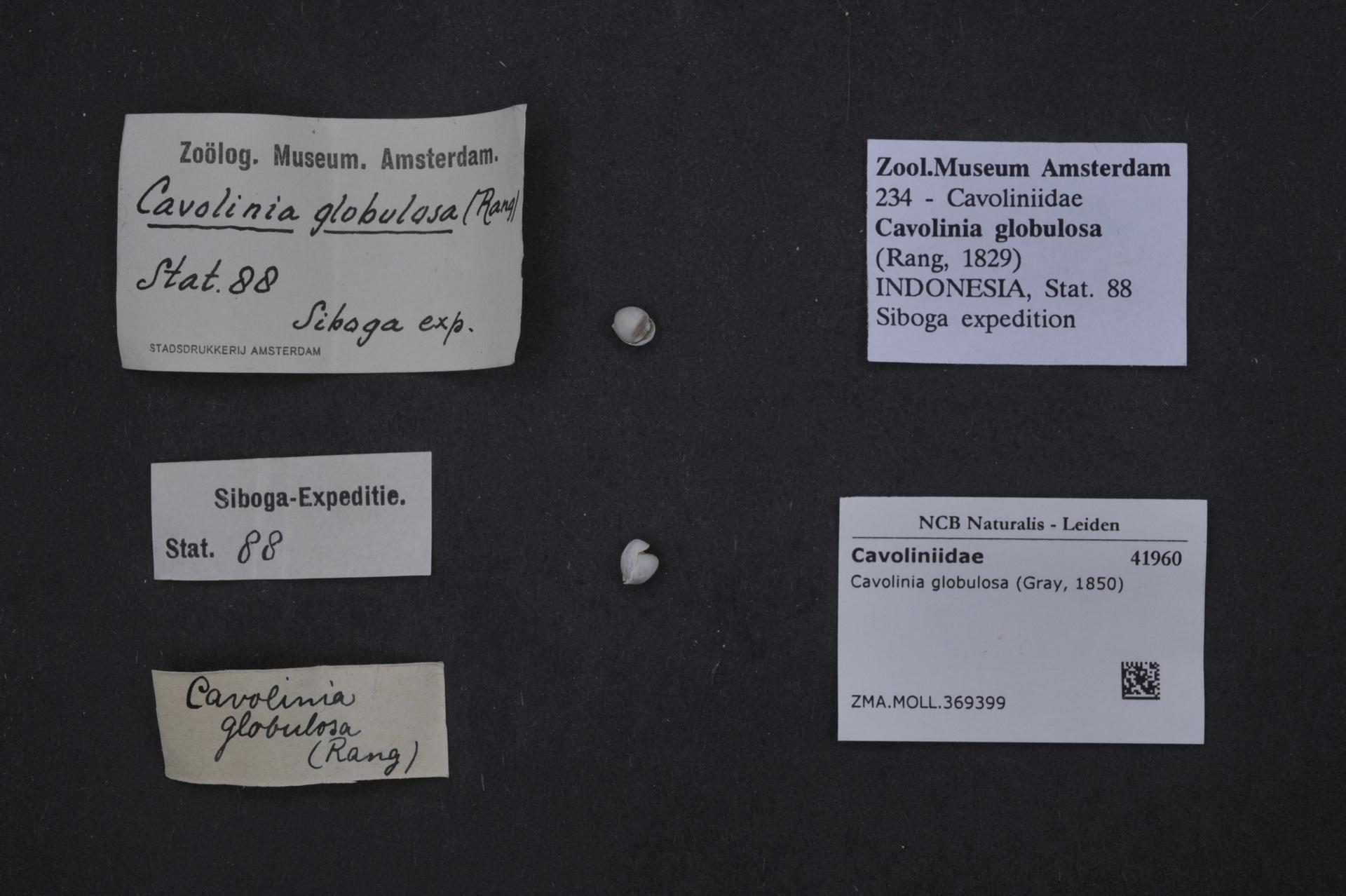

Scientific classification
- Kingdom: Animalia
- Phylum: Mollusca
- Class: Gastropoda
- Clade: Euopisthobranchia
- Order: Pteropoda
- Family: Cavoliniidae
- Genus: Cavolinia
- Species: C. globulosa

Binomial name
- Cavolinia globulosa Gray, 1850

= Cavolinia globulosa =

Species of Gastropoda

Cavolinia globulosa is a species of gastropod in the family Cavoliniidae.
