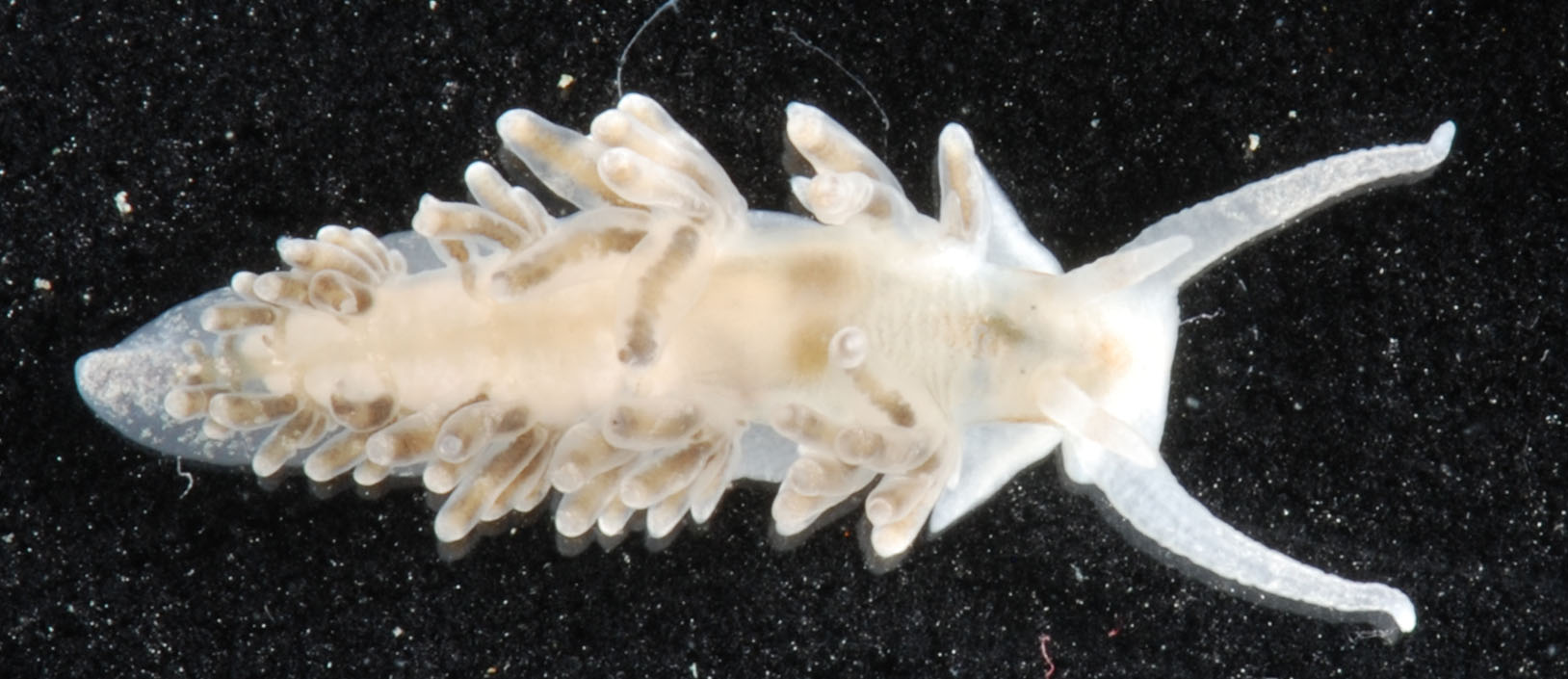

Scientific classification
- Kingdom: Animalia
- Phylum: Mollusca
- Class: Gastropoda
- Order: Nudibranchia
- Suborder: Aeolidacea
- Family: Facelinidae
- Genus: Cratena
- Species: C. pilata

Binomial name
- Cratena pilata (Gould, 1870)

Synonyms
- Aeolis pilata Gould, 1870

= Cratena pilata =

Species of gastropod

Cratena pilata is a species of sea slug, an aeolid nudibranch, a marine gastropod mollusc in the family Facelinidae.

== Distribution ==
This species was described from the Atlantic coast of the United States.
