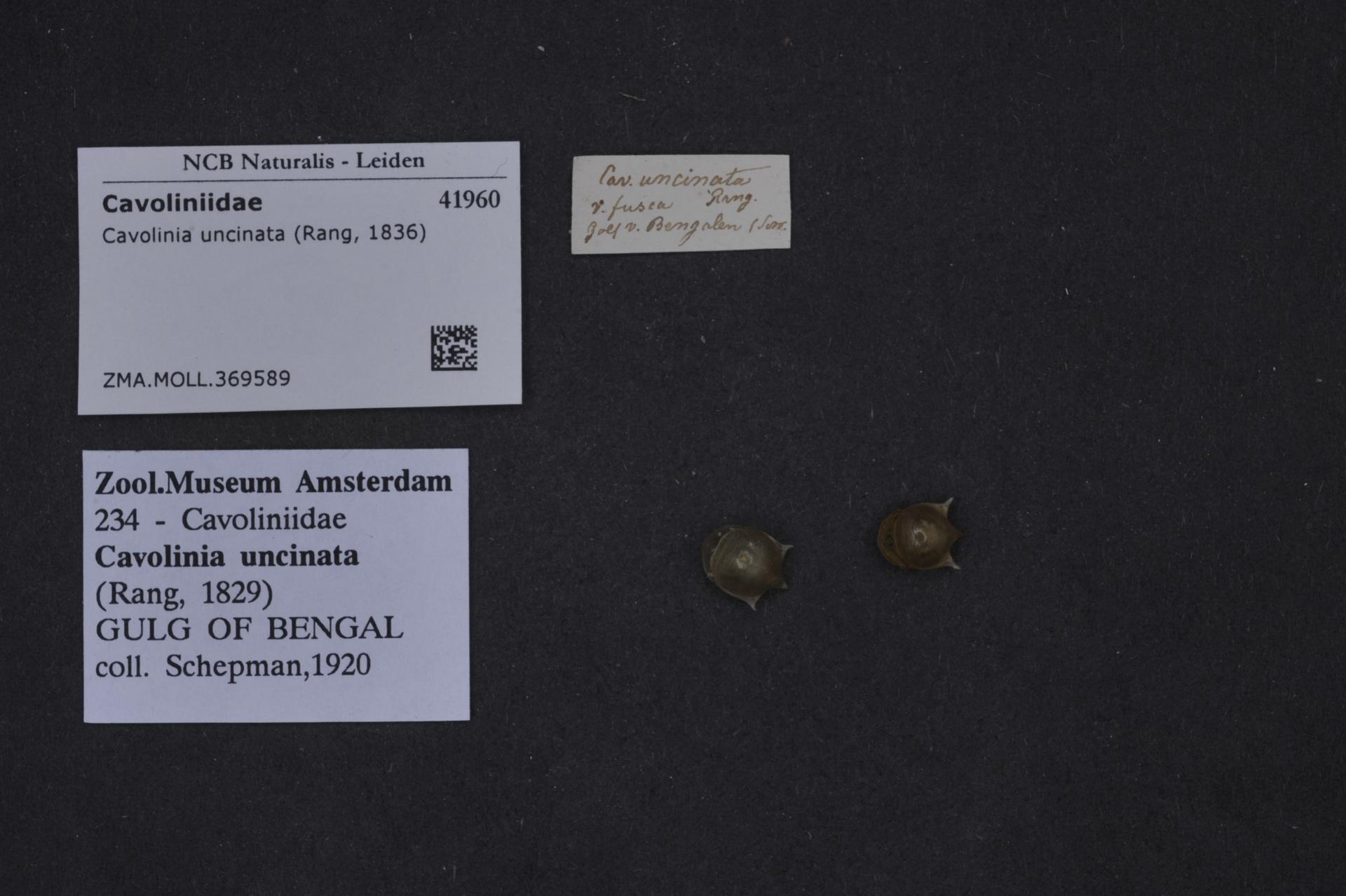

Scientific classification
- Kingdom: Animalia
- Phylum: Mollusca
- Class: Gastropoda
- Clade: Euopisthobranchia
- Order: Pteropoda
- Family: Cavoliniidae
- Genus: Cavolinia
- Species: C. uncinata

Binomial name
- Cavolinia uncinata (d'Orbigny, 1835)

= Cavolinia uncinata =

Species of Gastropoda

Cavolinia uncinata is a species of gastropod in the family Cavoliniidae.
