= Catriona tema =

Scientific classification
- Kingdom: Animalia
- Phylum: Mollusca
- Class: Gastropoda
- Order: Nudibranchia
- Suborder: Aeolidacea
- Family: Trinchesiidae
- Genus: Catriona
- Species: C. tema

Binomial name
- Catriona tema Edmunds, 1968

Synonyms
- Cuthona tema Edmunds, 1968

Species of gastropod

Catriona tema is a species of sea slug, an aeolid nudibranch, a marine gastropod mollusc in the family Trinchesiidae.

== Distribution ==
This species was described from Teshie, between Accra and Tema, Ghana.

== Description ==
The size of the first specimen found of this species was 11 mm. The body is pearl-grey in colour and there is a white band across the front of the head which extends along the side of the head almost to the first cerata. There are about 40 cerata, translucent with a broad white band below the tip and scattered white glands in the epidermis of the lower part. The rhinophores are tipped with white and have an orange line extending from the base to about the halfway point where it becomes an orange band.

== Ecology ==
Catriona tema was found on the sea shore at low water on the hydroid Pennaria disticha, family Pennariidae.
