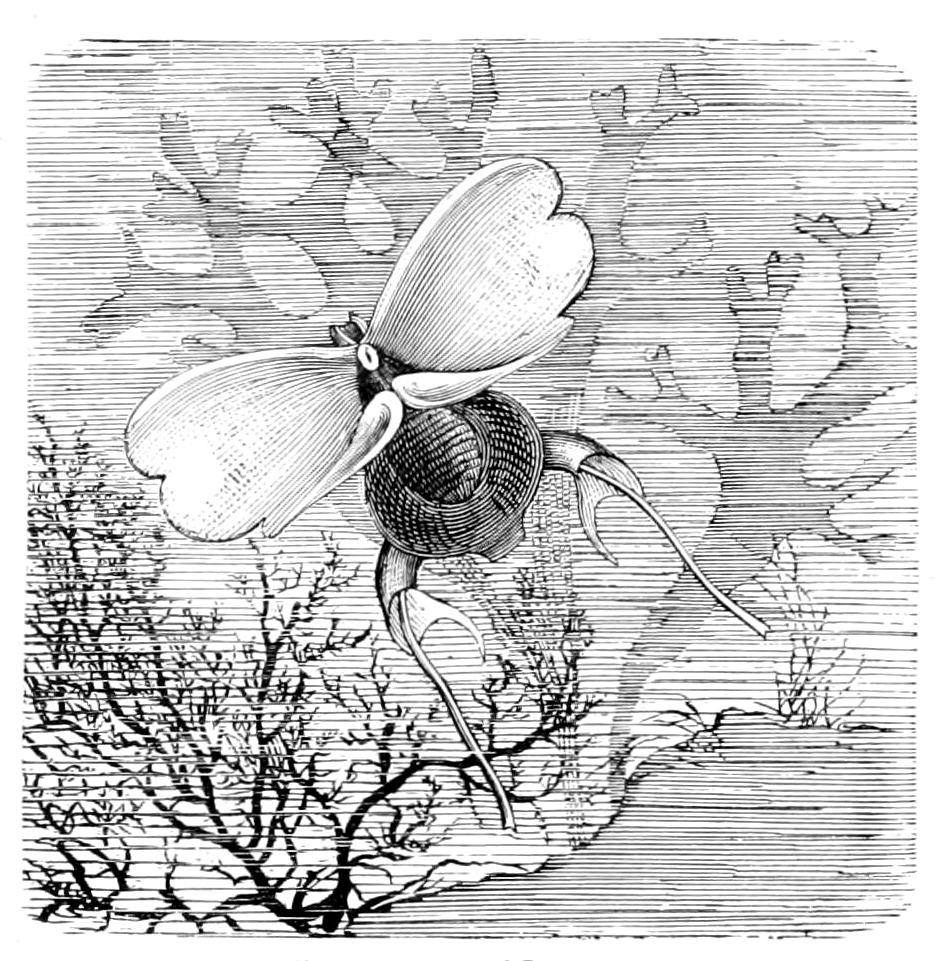
- Cavolinia tridentata

Scientific classification
- Kingdom: Animalia
- Phylum: Mollusca
- Class: Gastropoda
- Clade: Euopisthobranchia
- Order: Pteropoda
- Suborder: Euthecosomata
- Superfamily: Cavolinioidea
- Family: Cavoliniidae (Gray, 1850 (1815))

Synonyms
- Cleodoridae Gray, 1840; Hyalaeidae Rafinesque, 1815

= Cavoliniidae =

Family of gastropods

The family Cavoliniidae is a taxonomic group of small floating sea snails, pelagic marine opisthobranch gastropod mollusks.

This family is part of a larger group which is commonly known as the sea butterflies because they swim by flapping what appear to be small "wings".

== Distribution ==
This family of sea butterflies are circumglobal, carried by the sea currents to all the seas of the world.

== Habitat ==
Cavoliniids prefer deep waters, from 100 m down to 2,000 m. They do best in warm oceanic water.

== Life habits ==
Towards the anterior end of the animal, two parapodia (winglike flat lobules) protrude between each half of the shell. The parapodia enable these sea butterflies to float along in the water currents, using slow flapping movements. The parapodia are also covered with cilia, which produce a minute water current that pushes the planktonic food to the mouth of the animal.

== Taxonomy ==
In 2003, the family Cavoliniidae was raised to the rank of superfamily Cavolinioidea. At the same time, the subfamilies were given the new status of families: Cavoliniidae, Cliidae, Creseidae and Cuvierinidae.

=== 2005 taxonomy ===
In the taxonomy of Bouchet & Rocroi (2005) several families have been categorized as subfamilies of the family Cavoliniidae:

- Subfamily Cavoliinae Gray, 1850 (1815) – formerly Hyalaeidae Rafinesque, 1815
- Subfamily Clioinae Jeffreys, 1869 – formerly Cleodoridae Gray, 1840 – nomen oblitum
- Subfamily Cuvierininae van der Spoel, 1967 – formerly: Cuvieriidae Gray, 1840 (nom. inv.); Tripteridae Gray, 1850
- Subfamily Creseinae Curry, 1982

== Genera ==
Genera in the family Cavoliniidae include:

Genus Cavolinia Abildgaard, 1791 – A very distinctive shape of shell with a marked bulge on the ventral plate. The species consists of protandric hermaphrodites.

- Cavolinia angulosa
- Cavolinia couthouyi Dall, 1908
- Cavolinia gibbosa (d'Orbigny, 1836) – Gibbose Cavoline. Distribution: circumglobal, US Atlantic Coast, Bermuda, Cuba, Atlantic. Length: 10 mm.
  - Forma Cavolinia gibbosa f. flava (d'Orbigny, 1834)
  - Forma Cavolinia gibbosa f. gibboides Rampal, 2002
  - Forma Cavolinia gibbosa f. gibbosa (d'Orbigny, 1834)
  - Forma Cavolinia gibbosa f. plana Meisenheimer, 1905
- Cavolinia globulosa J.E.Gray, 1850 – Distribution: tropical Atlantic, Madagascar. Length: 8 mm long and 4.5 mm wide. Description: The globose, transparent shell with a brownish colour. The anterior section of the shell is rounded. The anterior section of the ventral side has strong transverse ribs.
- Cavolinia inflata
- Cavolinia inflexa (Lesueur, 1813) – Inflexed Cavoline. Distribution: circumglobal, Red Sea, Bermuda, Cuba, Brazil. Length: 7 mm.
- Cavolinia labiata d'Orbigny, 1836
- Cavolinia longirostratus (Blainville, 1821)
- Cavolinia occidentalis
- Cavolinia pachysoma Rampal, 2002
- Cavolinia quadridentata
- Cavolinia telemus Linnaeus, 1767
- Cavolinia tridentata (Niebuhr, 1775) – Three-tooth Cavoline, Distribution: circumglobal, Gulf of Mexico, Mascarene Islands, Western Atlantic, South Africa, Red Sea. Length: 20 mm. Description: globose transparent shell, with pointed proto-conch and three distinctive posterior projections; two lateral mantle appendages; brownish color.
- Cavolinia trispinosa
- Cavolinia uncinata (Rang, 1829) – Uncinate Cavoline. Distribution: circumglobal, Red Sea, Gulf of Mexico.
  - Cavolinia uncinata uncinata Rang, 1829
  - Cavolinia uncinata pulsatapusilla Van der Spoel, 1993

Genus Diacavolinia van der Spoel, 1987

Twenty two species of Diacavolinia. Diacavolinia species are characterised by the absence of a caudal spine

- Diacavolina angulosa J.E. Gray, 1850 – Distribution: Indo-Pacific, Atlantic. Length: 4 mm.
- Diacavolinia bicornis van der Spoel, Bleeker and Kobayashi, 1993 – Distribution: Indo-Pacific, Atlantic Ocean. Length: 8 mm
- Diacavolina constricta van der Spoel, Bleeker and Kobayashi, 1993 – Distribution: Bermuda, Venezuela.
- Diacavolinia deblainvillei van der Spoel, Bleeker and Kobayashi, 1993 – Distribution: Caribbean, Western Atlantic. Length: 7 mm.
- Diacavolinia deshayesi van der Spoel, Bleeker and Kobayashi, 1993 – Distribution: Bermuda, Panama, French Guiana. Length : 8 mm.
- Diacavolinia elegans van der Spoel, Bleeker and Kobayashi, 1993 – Distribution: New Jersey. Length: 6 mm.
- Diacavolinia flexipes van der Spoel, Bleeker and Kobayashi, 1993 – Distribution: SE Asia. Length: 5 mm.
- Diacavolinia limbata van der Spoel, Bleeker and Kobayashi, 1993 – Distribution: Brazil, southern Indo-Pacific. Length: 13 mm.
- Diacavolinia longirostris (de Blainville, 1821) – Long-snout Cavoline, Distribution: circumglobal, Red Sea, Madagascar, West Pacific, Australian; Gulf of Mexico. Length: 7 mm; width: 4.9 to 6.8 mm. Description: globulous brownish shell with two distinct lateral spines and a long rostrum on the dorsal rim. Dorsal side of the shell is relatively flat whereas the ventral side is deeply rounded.
  - Diacavolinia longirostris angulata Souleyet, 1852
- Diacavolinia mcgowani van der Spoel, Bleeker and Kobayashi, 1993
- Diacavolinia ovalis van der Spoel, Bleeker and Kobayashi, 1993 – Distribution: Caribbean, West Atlantic. Length: 6 mm.
- Diacavolinia robusta van der Spoel, Bleeker and Kobayashi, 1993 – Distribution: Caribbean, West Atlantic. Length: 5.4 mm.
- Diacavolinia strangulata (G. P. Deshayes, 1823) – Distribution: Panama, Brazil, Cuba. Length: 4 mm.

Genus Diacria J. E. Gray, 1847

The genus comprises two species groups and a total of ten species. The species may be globular, with both dorsal and ventral sides rounded, or bilaterally symmetrical with a long caudal spine. The species are protandric hermaphrodites. They are the largest of the Cavoliniids.

- Diacria atlantica L. Dupont, 1979 – Distribution: Massachusetts. Length: 9 mm.
- Diacria costata G. Pfeffer, 1879 – Distribution: Indo-Pacific
- Diacria danae van Leyen and van der Spoel, 1982 – Distribution: circumglobal in warm seas. Length: 9 mm.
- Diacria maculata Bleeker and van der Spoel, 1988
- Diacria major (Boas, 1886) – Distribution: Florida, Bermuda, Atlantic Ocean, Indian Ocean. Length: 13 mm
- Diacria quadridentata (Blainville, 1821) – Four-tooth Cavoline. Distribution: circumglobal, Red Sea, Madagascar, Gulf of Mexico, Japan. Length: 3 mm; width : 1.8 to 2.5 mm. Description: a small, globular shell, with curved spinal and ventral sides. There are no caudal or lateral spines. The dorsal side extends further than the ventral side : synonym of Diacria erythra van der Spoel, 1971
  - Diacria quadridentata costata Pfeiffer, 1879 – from Japan
  - Diacria quadridentata quadridentata (Blainville, 1821): synonym of Diacria quadridentata (Blainville, 1821)
  - Diacria quadridentata quadridentata f. danae van der Spoel, 1969: synonym of Diacria danae van Leyen & van der Spoel, 1982
- Diacria rampali Dupont, 1979 – Distribution: Florida, Brazil. Length: 10 mm
- Diacria rubecula Bontes & van der Spoel, 1998 – Distribution: warmer regions of North Atlantic. Length: 11 mm
- Diacria schmidti Leyen & van der Spoel, 1982 – Distribution: Pacific
  - Diacria schmidti schmidti van Leyen & van der Spoel, 1982
- Diacria trispinosa (Blainville, 1821) – Three-spine Cavoline. Distribution: circumglobal, Gulf of Mexico, Madagascar. Length: 13 mm; width: 10 mm. Description: The slightly transparent, brownish shell is bilaterally symmetrical and is darker on the ribbed sections. Very long caudal spine and strong lateral spines. There are five ribs on the dorsal side and three ribs on the ventral side.

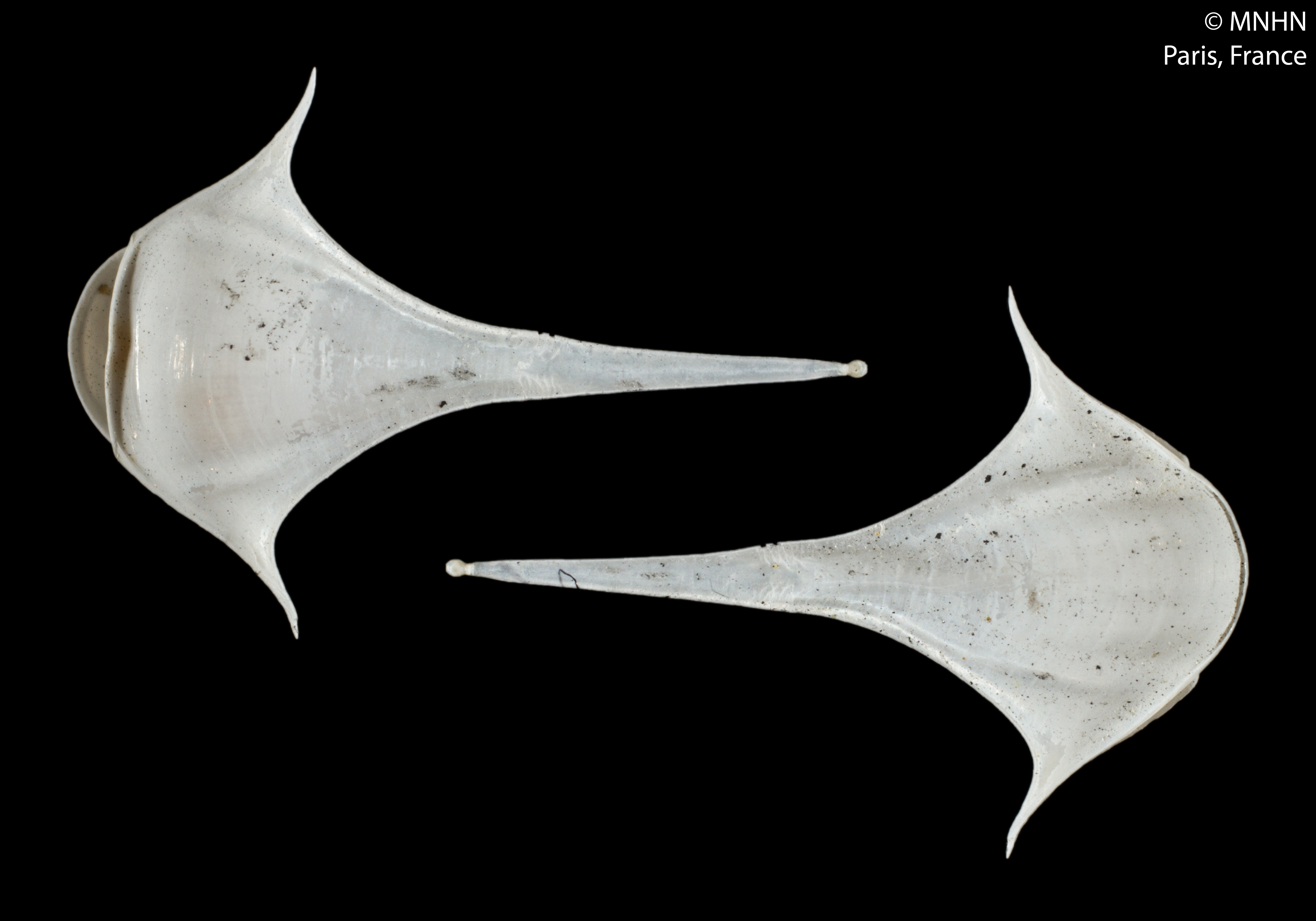
Shell of Diacria trispinosa (holotype at MNHN, Paris)

=== Clioinae ===
Clioinae Jeffreys, 1869 = Family Cliidae Jeffreys, 1869

This family name has for a long time been Clioidae with the type genus Clio. Unfortunately this is often confused with another molluscan family Clionidae, which has the type genus Clione. The International Commission on Zoological Nomenclature (ICZN) has therefore changed the name back to its original spelling Cliidae Jeffreys, 1869, type genus Clio Linnaeus, 1767

Genus Clio Linnaeus, 1767 (synonyms: Cleodora Peron & Lesueur, 1810; Euclio Bonnevie, 1912 )

All species in this genus are characterised by a bilaterally symmetric, straight or adapically dorso-ventrally slightly curved shell, with an elliptical to triangular transverse section; protoconch clearly separated, globular or elliptical, frequently with a spine at the tip. Subgenera are used for some species (e.g. Clio s.str., Balantium Bellardi, 1872, Bellardiclio Janssen, 2004), but most species cannot yet be assigned to one of these. Numerous fossil species have been described.

Recognised extant species are:

- Clio andreae (Boas, 1886)
  - Distribution : north Atlantic, bathypelagic species.
- Clio antarctica Dall, 1908
- Clio australis: synonym of Clione limacina australis (Bruguière, 1792)
- Clio bartletti van der Spoel, 1978
  - Distribution: central Atlantic (Pleistocene fossil).
- Clio campylura (Tesch, 1948)
- Clio chaptalii J. E. Gray, 1850
  - Distribution : tropical, circumglobal.
- Clio convexa convexa Boas, 1886
  - Distribution: tropical, Indo-Pacific
- Clio convexa cyphosa Rampal, 2002
  - Distribution: Red Sea and Gulf of Aden).
- Clio cuspidata (Bosc, 1802)
  - Distribution : tropical/subtropical, circumglobal.
- Clio orthotheca (Tesch, 1904)
- Clio piatkowskii van der Spoel, Schalk & Bleeker, 1992
  - Distribution: Antarctic.
- Clio polita Pelseneer, 1888
- Clio pyramidata Linnaeus, 1767
  - Distribution : north Atlantic
  - Height : to over 20 mm.

Formae:

    - forma excisa van der Spoel, 1963
    - forma lanceolata Lesueur, 1813 (tropical/subtropical, circumglobal)
    - forma martensi (Pfeiffer, 1880) ??
    - forma sulcata (Pfeffer, 1879)

The true status of these formae has to be evaluated, they might be real formae, subspecies, or even species.

- Clio recurva (Children, 1823)
  - Distribution : tropical-subtropical, circumglobal (bathypelagic species)**
    - Height: to over 30 mm
- Clio sulcata (Pfeffer, 1879)

=== Cuvierininae ===
This subfamily has been raised to the rank of family Cuvierinidae van der Spoel, 1967

Extinct genera:

- Spoelia Janssen, 1990
  - Spoelia torquayensis Janssen, 1990 – (Late Oligocene, Early Miocene)
- Johnjagtia Janssen, 2005 – (Early Miocene)
  - Johnjagtia moulinsi (Benoist, 1873) – (Early Miocene)
- Ireneia Janssen, 1995
  - Ireneia tenuistriata (Semper, 1861) – (Late Oligocene)
  - Ireneia nieulandei Janssen, 1995 – (Early Miocene)
  - Ireneia calandrellii (Michelotti, 1847) – (Early Miocene)
  - Ireneia testudinaria (Michelotti, 1847) – (Early-Middle Miocene)
  - Ireneia gracilis Janssen, 2005 – (Middle Miocene)
  - Ireneia marqueti Janssen, 1995 – (Late Miocene)

Extant genera:

- Genus Cuvierina Boas, 1886 sensu lato

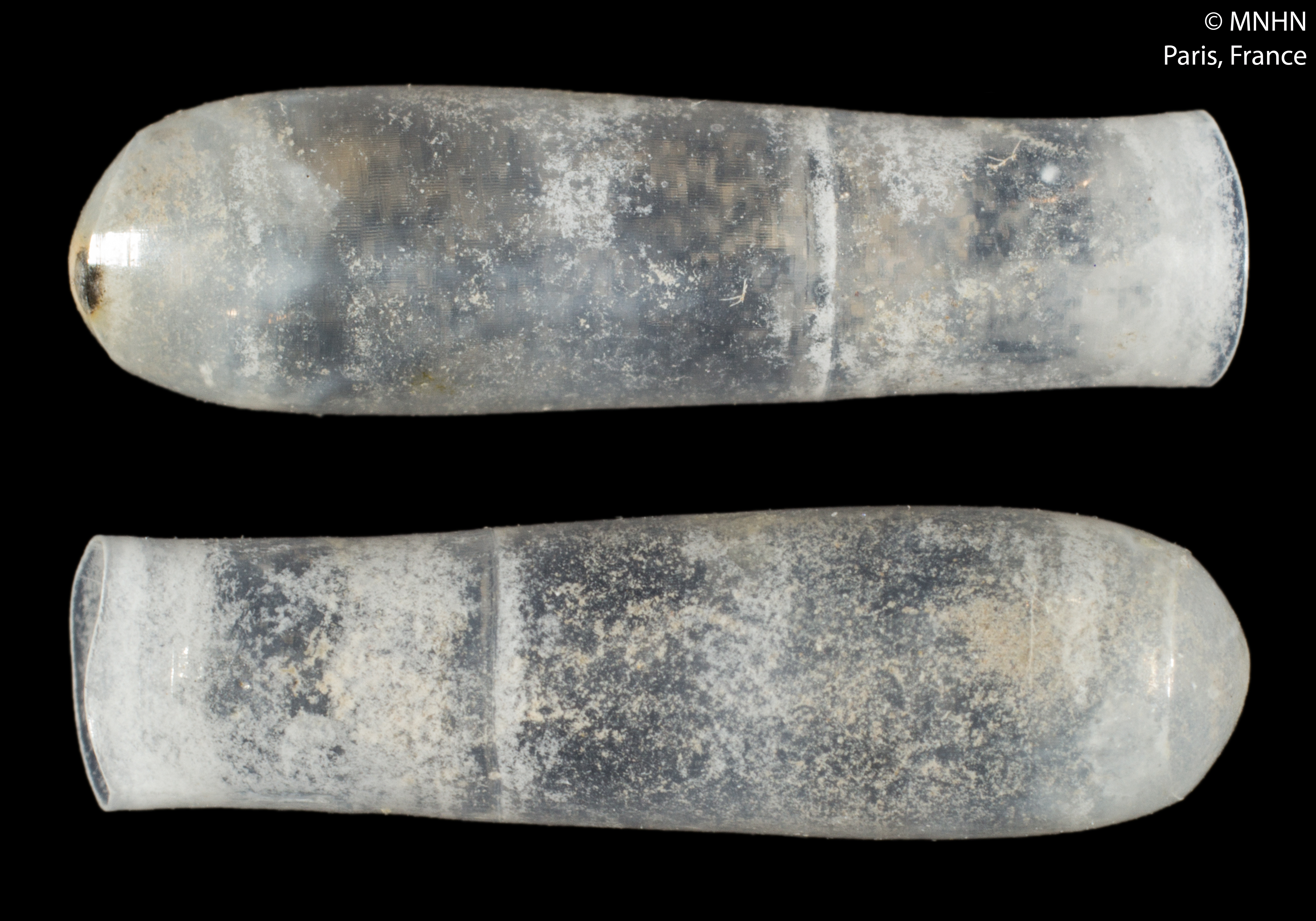
Cuvierina columnella

The genus Cuvierina developed from the Ireneia lineage during the Early Miocene and is split in two subgenera:

  - Subgenus Cuvierina sensu stricto

Extant species:

    - Cuvierina columnella (Rang, 1827) – (Indo-Pacific)
    - Cuvierina atlantica Bé, MacClintock & Currie, 1972 – (Atlantic)
    - Cuvierina pacifica Janssen, 2005 – (Pacific)

Extinct species:

    - Cuvierina torpedo (Marshall, 1918) – (Early Miocene)
    - Cuvierina paronai Checchia-Rispoli, 1921 – (Middle – Late Miocene)
    - Cuvierina grandis d'Alessandro & Robba, 1980 – (Late Miocene)
    - Cuvierina jagti Janssen, 1995 – (Late Miocene)
    - Cuvierina ludbrooki (Caprotti, 1962) – (Pliocene)
    - Cuvierina miyazakiensis Ujihara, 1996 – (Pliocene)
    - Cuvierina astesana (Rang, 1829) – (Pliocene)
  - Subgenus Urceolarica Janssen, 2006

Extant species:

    - Cuvierina urceolaris Mörch, 1850 – (Indo-Pacific)
    - Cuvierina cancapae Janssen, 2005 – (Atlantic)

Extinct species:

    - Cuvierina intermedia (Bellardi, 1873) (Middle Miocene – Pliocene)
    - Cuvierina curryi Janssen, 2005 (Middle Miocene)
    - Cuvierina inflata (Bellardi, 1873) (Late Miocene – Pliocene)

=== Creseinae ===
Creseinae Curry, 1982 Genus Creseis Rang, 1828

This subfamily has been raised to the rank of family Creseidae, belonging to the superfamily Limacinoidea.

The shells of the species in this genus have the form of a more or less narrow, conically widening tube.

- Creseis chierchiae Boas, 1886
  - Distribution : tropical-subtropical, circumglobal.
  - Length: shell up to 9 mm high.
  - Description: shell straight or slightly curved, initially slowly, later hardly increasing in diameter, with clear annulations, protoconch with rounded tip, followed by a distinct swelling. A form with lacking annulations, also known as a Pliocene fossil, is described as C. chierchiae forma constricta Chen & Bé, 1964.
- Creseis clava (Rang, 1828) (synonym: Creseis acicula (Rang, 1828)
  - Distribution : tropical-subtropical, circumglobal.
  - Length: shell is up to 35 mm high.
  - Description : shell, long and straight or slightly irregular, with small apical angle, circular in cross section; smooth shell surface; protoconch without swelling; there is a characteristic tentacular lobe on the
- Creseis conica Eschscholtz, 1829
  - Distribution : tropical-subtropical, circumglobal.
  - Length: shell height up to 20 mm.
  - Description : shell straight or slightly curved, with a wider apical angle than C. clava, transverse section circular, protoconch slightly swollen.
- Creseis virgula (Rang, 1828)
  - Distribution : tropical-subtropical, circumglobal.
  - Length: shell height up to 12 mm
  - Description : shell with circular transverse section, curved in its basal part.

Genus Hyalocylis Fol, 1875

- Hyalocylis striata (Rang, 1828)
  - Distribution : tropical-suntropical, circumglobal.
  - Length : 10 mm
  - Description : shell slightly curved dorsally, with distinct annulations, transverse section initially circular, later slightly dorso-ventrally compressed. The animal is often easily recognised by the very large fins.

Genus Styliola Gray, 1850 (synonyms: Cleodora recta Blainville, 1825; Cleodora subula Quoy & Gaimard, 1827 (basionym); Creseis spinifera Rang, 1828)

- Styliola subula (Quoy & Gaimard, 1827)
  - Distribution : tropical-suntropical, circumglobal, absent in the Red Sea.
  - Length : 13 mm
  - Description : needle-like shell, transparent and round in cross-section. A prominent oblique dorsal furrow runs from a short distance above the protoconch to the aperture, building a toothlike process. There is no tentacular lobe on the anterior margin of the fins.
