= Cratena poshitraensis =

Scientific classification
- Kingdom: Animalia
- Phylum: Mollusca
- Class: Gastropoda
- Order: Nudibranchia
- Suborder: Aeolidacea
- Family: Facelinidae
- Genus: Cratena
- Species: C. poshitraensis

Binomial name
- Cratena poshitraensis Bharate, Padula, Apte & Shimpi, 2020

Species of gastropod

Cratena poshitraensis is a species of sea slug, an aeolid nudibranch, a marine gastropod mollusc in the family Facelinidae.

== Distribution ==
This species was described from India. It has also been reported from Australia.
