= Telodiacria danae =

Scientific classification
- Kingdom: Animalia
- Phylum: Mollusca
- Class: Gastropoda
- Clade: Euopisthobranchia
- Order: Pteropoda
- Superfamily: Cavolinioidea
- Family: Cavoliniidae
- Genus: Telodiacria
- Species: T. danae

Binomial name
- Telodiacria danae (Leyen, A. van & Spoel, S. van der., 1982)

Synonyms
- Diacria danae van Leyen & van der Spoel, 1982; Diacria quadridentata quadridentata f. danae van der Spoel, 1969

Species of pteropod

Telodiacria danae is a species of pteropod. It was formerly known as Diacra danae.

== Environment ==
The species is concentrated in the Gulf of Mexico, and was also seen in remote locations, such as near Tokelau and Kiribati.
