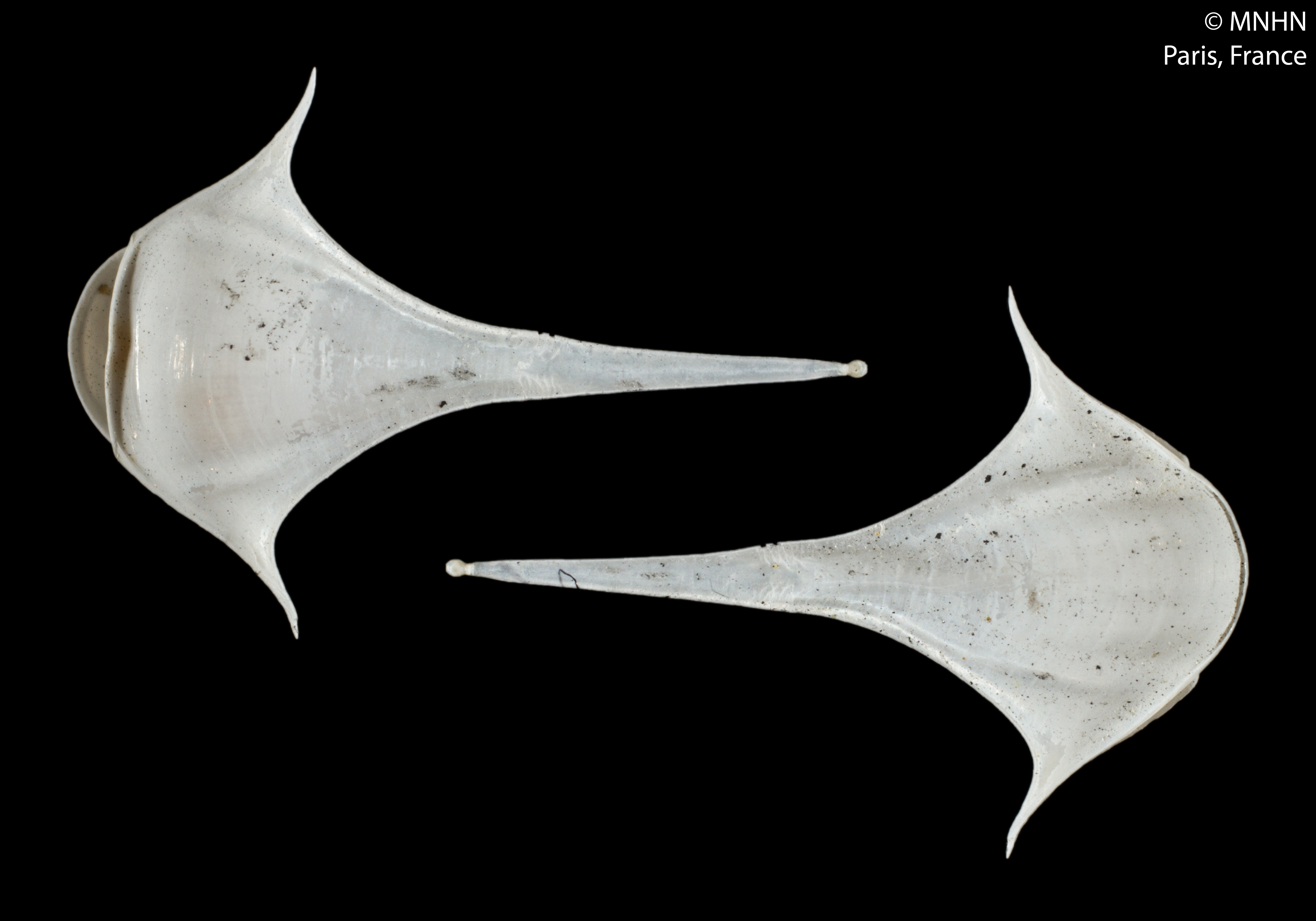
- Diacria trispinosa

Scientific classification
- Kingdom: Animalia
- Phylum: Mollusca
- Class: Gastropoda
- Clade: Euopisthobranchia
- Order: Pteropoda
- Family: Cavoliniidae
- Genus: Diacria; Gray, 1840

= Diacria (gastropod) =

Genus of molluscs

Diacria is a genus of gastropods belonging to the family Cavoliniidae.

The genus has almost cosmopolitan distribution.

Species:

- Diacria digitata (Guppy, 1882)
- Diacria erythra van der Spoel, 1971
- Diacria gracilis Rampal, 2002
- Diacria italica Grecchi, 1882
- Diacria maculata Bleeker & van der Spoel, 1988
- Diacria major (Boas, 1886)
- Diacria mbaensis Ladd, 1934
- Diacria microstriata A.W.Janssen, 2007
- Diacria paeninsula A.W.Janssen, 2007
- Diacria philippinensis A.W.Janssen, 2007
- Diacria piccola Bleeker & van der Spoel, 1988
- Diacria quadridentata (Lesueur, 1821)
- Diacria rampalae Dupont, 1979
- Diacria sangiorgii Scarsella, 1934
- Diacria trispinosa (Blainville, 1821)
