= Diacavolinia bicornis =

Scientific classification
- Kingdom: Animalia
- Phylum: Mollusca
- Class: Gastropoda
- Clade: Euopisthobranchia
- Order: Pteropoda
- Family: Cavoliniidae
- Genus: Diacavolinia
- Species: D. bicornis

Binomial name
- Diacavolinia bicornis van der Spoel, Bleeker & Kobayasi, 1993

Species of Gastropoda

Diacavolinia bicornis is a species of gastropod in the family Cavoliniidae.
