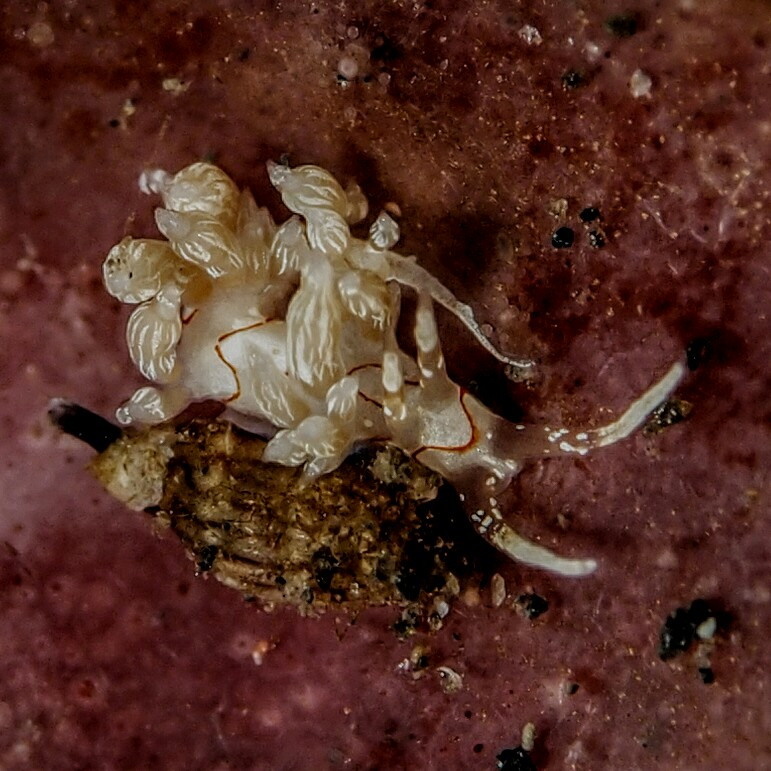

Scientific classification
- Kingdom: Animalia
- Phylum: Mollusca
- Class: Gastropoda
- Order: Nudibranchia
- Suborder: Aeolidacea
- Family: Facelinidae
- Genus: Cratena
- Species: C. simba

Binomial name
- Cratena simba Edmunds, 1970

= Cratena simba =

Species of gastropod

Cratena simba is a species of sea slug, an aeolid nudibranch, a marine gastropod mollusc in the family Facelinidae.

== Distribution ==
This species was described from Tanzania. It has been reported widely in the Indo-Pacific region as far East as Australia.
