= Cavolinia labiata =

Scientific classification
- Domain: Eukaryota
- Kingdom: Animalia
- Phylum: Mollusca
- Class: Gastropoda
- Clade: Euopisthobranchia
- Order: Pteropoda
- Family: Cavoliniidae
- Genus: Cavolinia
- Species: C. labiata

Binomial name
- Cavolinia labiata (d'Orbigny, 1835)

Synonyms
- Hyalaea labiata d'Orbigny, 1835

Species of Gastropoda

Cavolinia labiata is a species of pteropod in the family Cavoliniidae. It is a tropical species occurring in the Western Atlantic and Eastern Pacific Oceans. It can reach 0.7 cm (0.28 in) in length.

There are two subspecies:

- Cavolinia labiata labiata (d'Orbigny, 1835)
- Cavolinia labiata robusta Rampal, 2002
