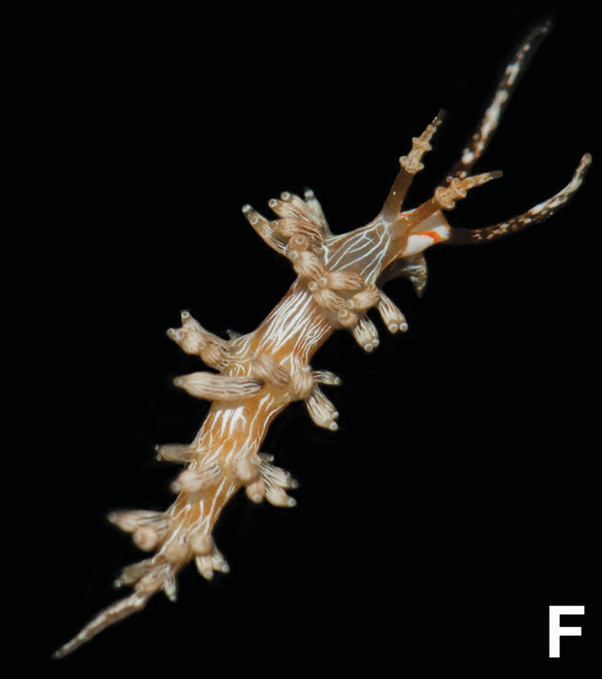
- Cratena affinis

Scientific classification
- Kingdom: Animalia
- Phylum: Mollusca
- Class: Gastropoda
- Order: Nudibranchia
- Suborder: Aeolidacea
- Family: Facelinidae
- Genus: Cratena
- Species: C. affinis

Binomial name
- Cratena affinis (Baba, 1949)

Synonyms
- Hervia affinis Baba, 1949

= Cratena affinis =

Species of gastropod

Cratena affinis is a species of sea slug, an aeolid nudibranch, a marine gastropod mollusc in the family Facelinidae.

== Distribution ==
This species was described from Sagami Bay, Japan.
