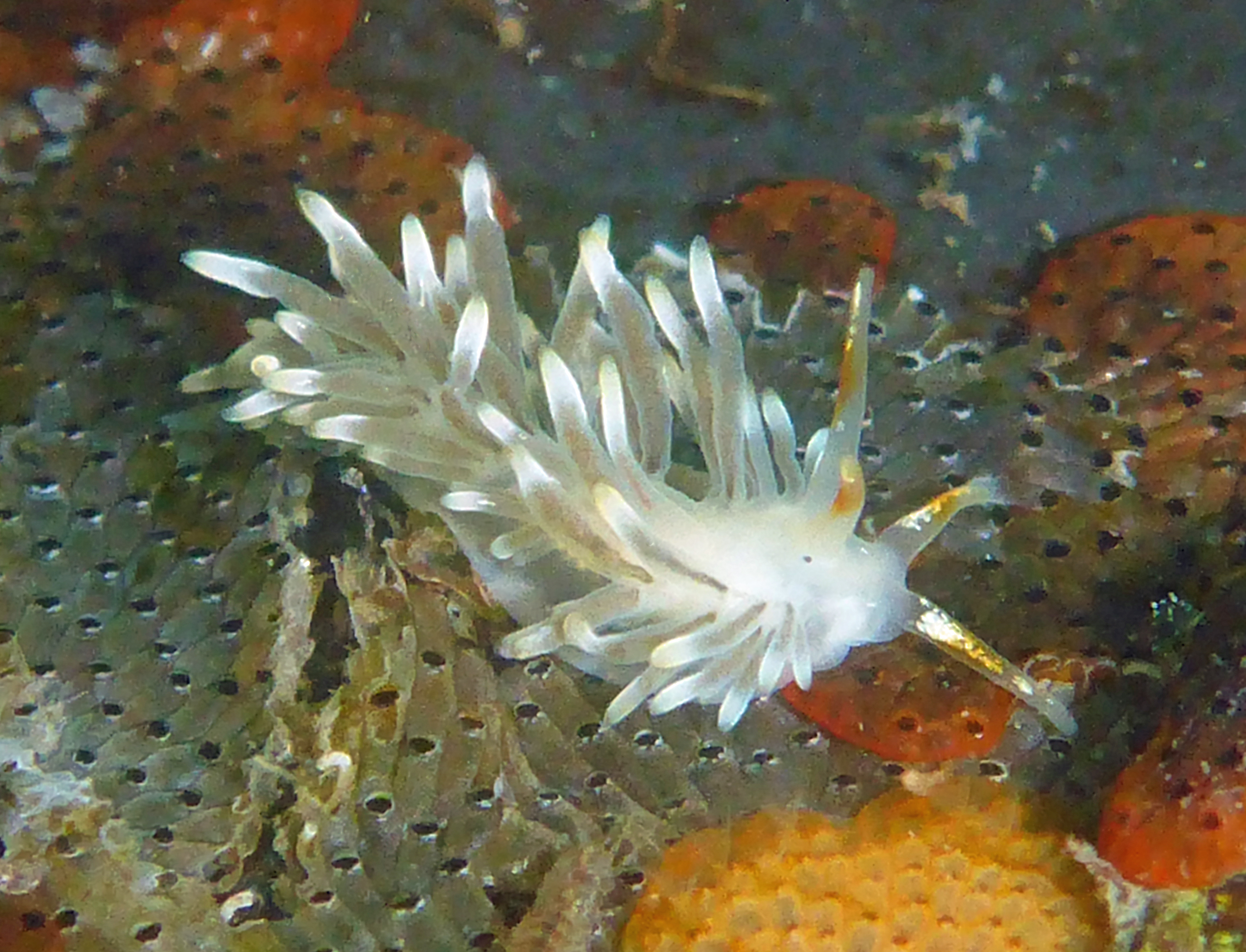
- Catriona rickettsi from Santa Cruz, California

Scientific classification
- Kingdom: Animalia
- Phylum: Mollusca
- Class: Gastropoda
- Order: Nudibranchia
- Suborder: Aeolidacea
- Family: Trinchesiidae
- Genus: Catriona
- Species: C. rickettsi

Binomial name
- Catriona rickettsi Behrens, 1984

= Catriona rickettsi =

Species of gastropod

Catriona rickettsi, common name Doc's aeolid, is a species of sea slug, an aeolid nudibranch, a marine gastropod mollusc in the family Trinchesiidae.
