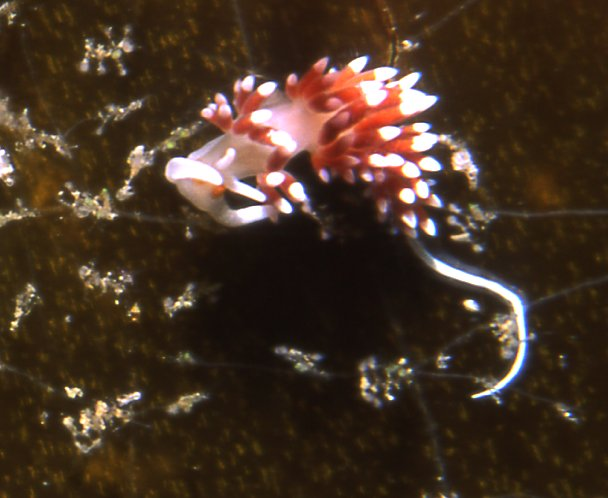

Scientific classification
- Kingdom: Animalia
- Phylum: Mollusca
- Class: Gastropoda
- Order: Nudibranchia
- Suborder: Aeolidacea
- Family: Facelinidae
- Genus: Cratena
- Species: C. capensis

Binomial name
- Cratena capensis Barnard, 1927

= Cratena capensis =

Species of gastropod

Cratena capensis, the orange-eyed nudibranch, is a species of sea slug, specifically an aeolid nudibranch. It is a marine gastropod mollusc in the family Facelinidae.

== Distribution ==
This species has only been found around the South African coast from Saldanha Bay to Port Alfred, intertidally to at least 30 m. It is endemic to South Africa.

== Description ==
Cratena capensis grows to between 10 and 30 mm in total length. It is a slender pale-bodied nudibranch which has smooth white rhinophores and a pair of elongated oral tentacles. The head bears two 'eye' patches of orange or red. Its cerata are reddish or orange with white tips. The colour of the cerata varies with diet.

== Ecology ==
This nudibranch feeds on a variety of hydroids. Its egg mass is a broad coil of one or two whorls.
