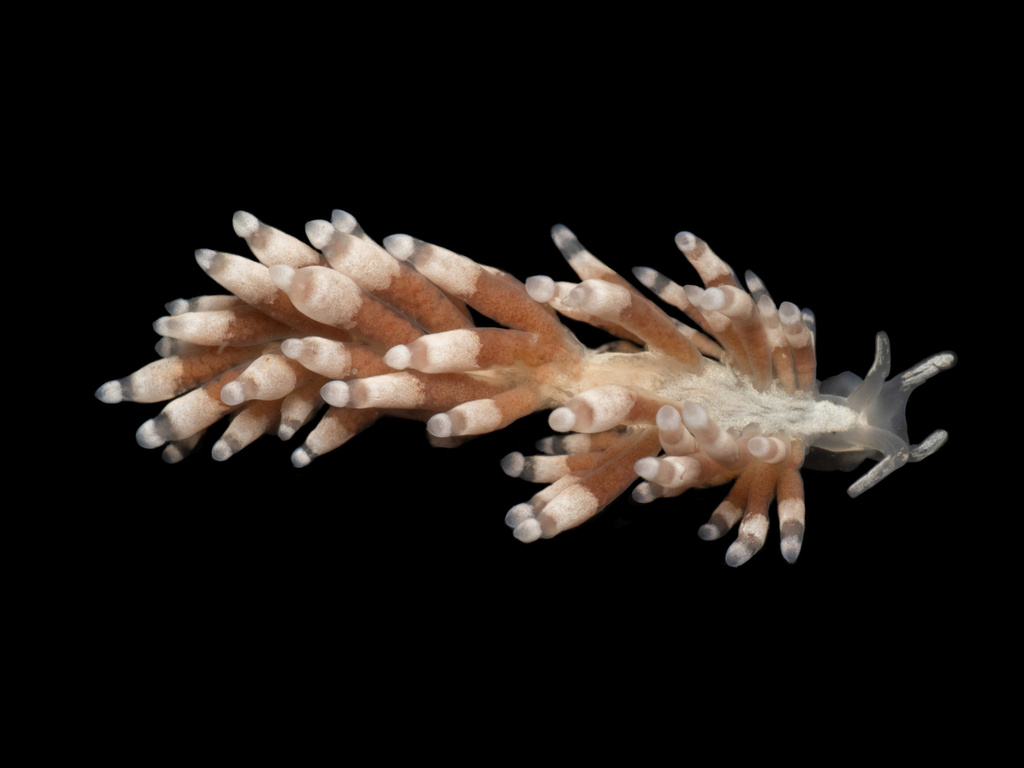

Scientific classification
- Kingdom: Animalia
- Phylum: Mollusca
- Class: Gastropoda
- Order: Nudibranchia
- Suborder: Aeolidacea
- Family: Trinchesiidae
- Genus: Catriona
- Species: C. maua

Binomial name
- Catriona maua Ev. Marcus & Er. Marcus, 1960

Synonyms
- Tenellia maua (Ev. Marcus & Er. Marcus, 1960)

= Catriona maua =

Species of gastropod

Catriona maua is a species of sea slug, an aeolid nudibranch, a marine gastropod mollusk in the family Trinchesiidae.

== Distribution ==
This species was described from Virginia Key, Miami, United States.
