= Cavolinia inflexa =

Scientific classification
- Kingdom: Animalia
- Phylum: Mollusca
- Class: Gastropoda
- Clade: Euopisthobranchia
- Order: Pteropoda
- Family: Cavoliniidae
- Genus: Cavolinia
- Species: C. inflexa

Binomial name
- Cavolinia inflexa (Lesueur, 1813)

Species of mollusc

Cavolinia inflexa is a species of small pteropod. Cavolinia inflexa are members of the thecosome pteropod genus that dwell in the epipelagic zone feeding on arctic snow and smaller microorganisms. While it is known that Cavolinia inflexa are filters feeders, their reproductive tendencies and behaviors are not well studied. They can be used as a proxy for assuming climatic conditions for a particular period and have been a focus of ocean acidification impact studies.

== Morphology and physiology ==
Like other thecosome pteropods, Cavolinia inflexa form an aggronite shell to surround their body. As a result, they have been found to be highly sensitive to ocean acidification and the constantly changing water column's chemical composition. Cavolinia inflexa are found to be between 2-8 millimeters in length, and have a length to width ratio between 0.51 and 0.81. Additionally, they have a straight shell, their posterior tip bent upwards, and a bilaterally symmetrical structure.

== Behavior ==
Cavolinia inflexa move throughout depths in response to where the largest concentration of food is, as it reacts to the vertical migration patterns expressed by zooplankton. However, they are mostly found floating in the epipelagic zone of the ocean. Their vertical migration is also in response to a diurnal cycle. They feed by ingesting their captured prey that has been snared by their mucus feedings webs. After 1-3 minutes they can completely consume and digest their snared prey.

== Life cycle and reproduction ==
Information on the reproduction of Cavolinia inflexa is scant, but there has been research conducted on the reproduction of similar pteropod species. The pteropod Limacina retroversa has a reproductive cycle occurring twice a year. The first occurring at the start of spring and the second nearing the end of summer. In order to survive and reproduce, the two distinct generations employ different life history strategies. Offspring born during the spring reproductive cycle develop more rapidly so they can mature in time for the summer mating season while offspring born during the summer withstand the physiological challenges of the cold winter to then reproduce the following spring. It takes at least 3 months of development for Limacina retroversa to produce viable egg clutches.

== Ecology and distribution ==
Cavolinia inflexa are a common thecosome pteropod found worldwide in warm waters between 55° N to 45° S. They are filter feeders as is typical among Pteropoda. Their diet consists of marine snow–organic matter that is suspended in the water column.

Cavolinia inflexa were initially believed to be multiple subspecies, but later studies show that the species does not exhibit enough regional variation to have categorical subspecies. Cavolinia inflexa live in the Atlantic, Indian, and Pacific Oceans, but there is not significant geographical variation.

Climate change may pose a threat to Cavolinia inflexa as ocean acidification has been shown to impact larval development. In particular, ocean acidification prevents the formation of their shells, leaving the organism vulnerable to predation. One study found a significant decrease in shell density among Cavolinia inflexa between 1910 and 2012.
