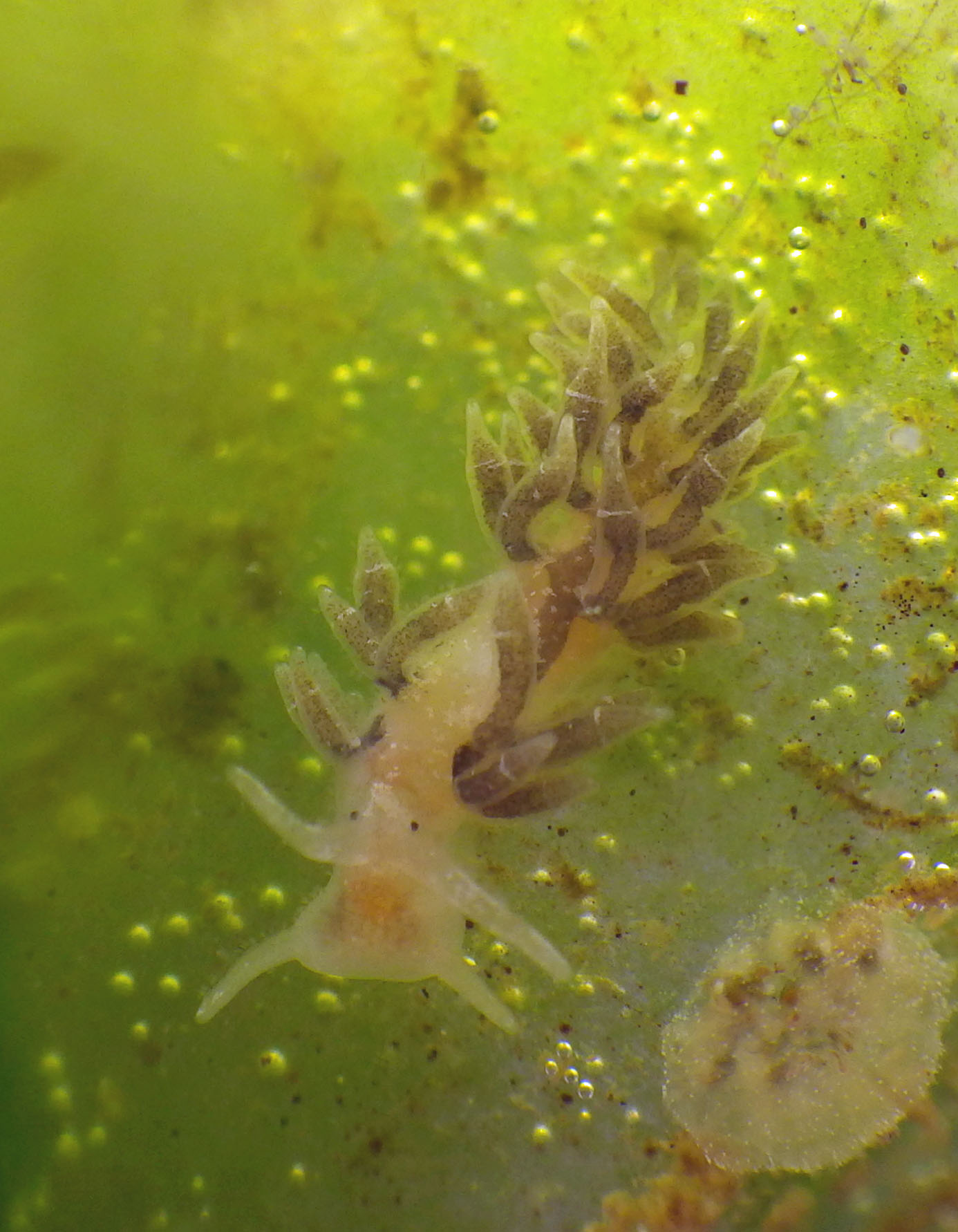
- Trinchesia perca from Lake Merritt, Oakland, California

Scientific classification
- Kingdom: Animalia
- Phylum: Mollusca
- Class: Gastropoda
- Order: Nudibranchia
- Suborder: Aeolidacea
- Family: Trinchesiidae
- Genus: Trinchesia
- Species: T. perca

Binomial name
- Trinchesia perca (Er. Marcus, 1958)

Synonyms
- Catriona perca Marcus Er., 1958; Cuthona perca (Er. Marcus, 1958)

= Trinchesia perca =

Species of gastropod

Trinchesia perca, common name Lake Merritt cuthona, is a species of sea slug, an aeolid nudibranch, a marine gastropod mollusk in the family Trinchesiidae. Its placement somewhat controversed, some institutions place it in genus Cuthona under family Cuthonidae.
