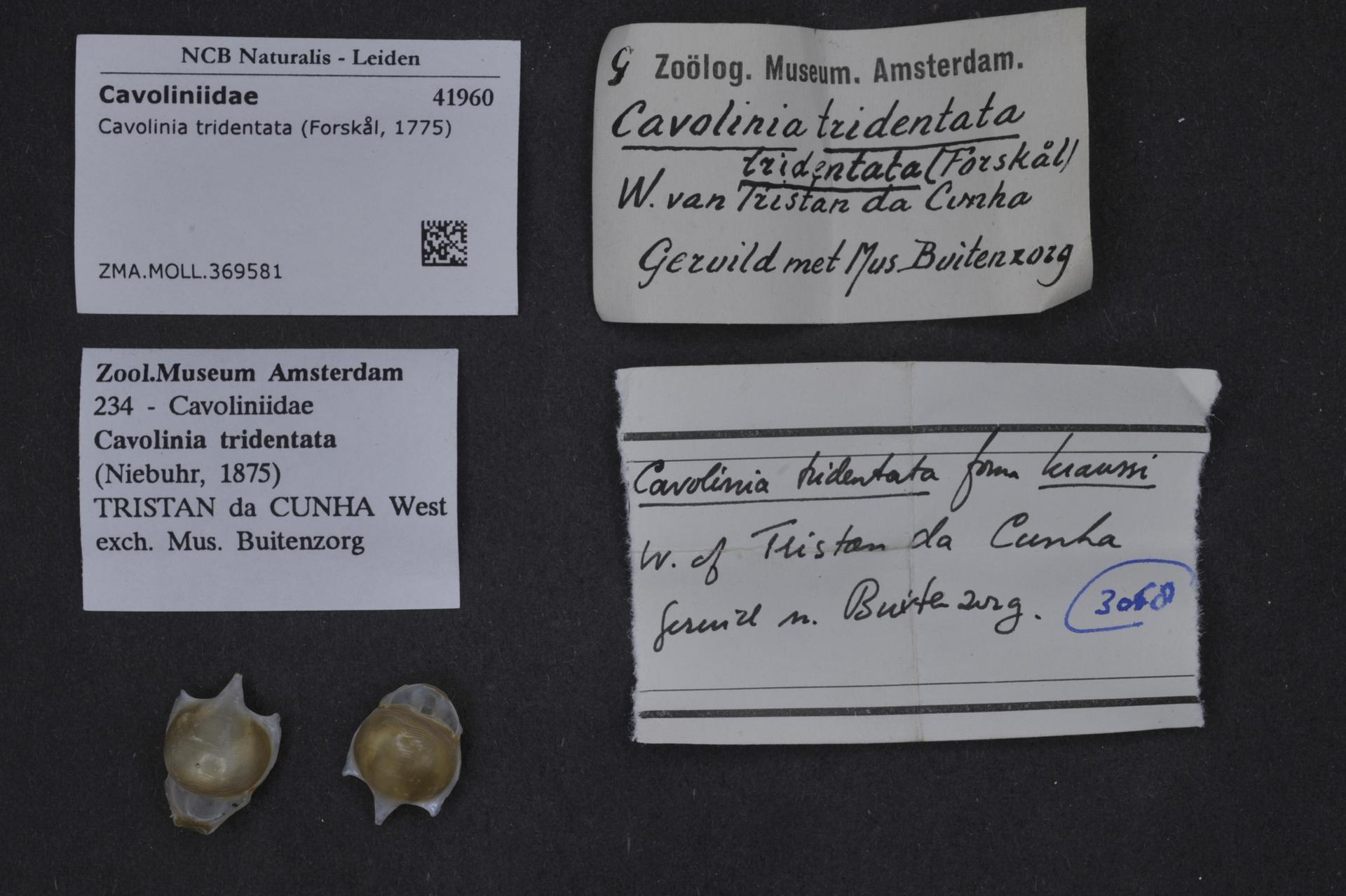
- Cavolinia tridentata

Scientific classification
- Domain: Eukaryota
- Kingdom: Animalia
- Phylum: Mollusca
- Class: Gastropoda
- Clade: Euopisthobranchia
- Order: Pteropoda
- Family: Cavoliniidae
- Subfamily: Cavoliniinae
- Genus: Cavolinia; Abildgaard, 1791

= Cavolinia (gastropod) =

Genus of gastropods

Cavolinia is a genus of gastropods belonging to the family Cavoliniidae.

The genus has cosmopolitan distribution.

Species:

- Cavolina pycna Jung, 1971
- Cavolina regulae Jung, 1971
- Cavolinia baniensis A.W.Janssen, 2007
- Cavolinia bituminata (Beets, 1953)
- Cavolinia cookei Simonelli, 1895
- Cavolinia floridana (R.L.Collins, 1934)
- Cavolinia gatti A.W.Janssen, 2012
- Cavolinia gibboides Rampal, 2002
- Cavolinia gibbosa (d'Orbigny, 1835)
- Cavolinia globosa Nomen Nudum
- Cavolinia globulosa Gray, 1850
- Cavolinia grandis (Bellardi, 1873)
- Cavolinia gypsorum (Bellardi, 1873)
- Cavolinia inflexa (Lesueur, 1813)
- Cavolinia labiata (d'Orbigny, 1835)
- Cavolinia landaui A.W.Janssen, 2004
- Cavolinia longicostata Rampal, 2002
- Cavolinia longirostratus (de Blainville, 1821)
- Cavolinia marginata (Bronn, 1862)
- Cavolinia mexicana (R.L.Collins, 1934)
- Cavolinia microbesitas A.W.Janssen, 2012
- Cavolinia moluccana (P.J.Fischer, 1927)
- Cavolinia occidentalis
- Cavolinia pachysoma Rampal, 2002
- Cavolinia perparvula A.W.Janssen, 2007
- Cavolinia quadridentata
- Cavolinia rewaensis Ladd, 1934
- Cavolinia shibatai A.W.Janssen, 2007
- Cavolinia toumeyi (Holmes, 1860)
- Cavolinia triaspis Woodring, 1970
- Cavolinia tridentata (Forsskål, 1775)
- Cavolinia tridentata (Niebuhr, 1775)
- Cavolinia uncinata (Rang, 1829)
- Cavolinia uncinata (d'Orbigny, 1835)
- Cavolinia ventricosa (Guppy, 1882)
- Cavolinia xenica Woodring, 1970
- Cavolinia zamboninii Checchia-Rispoli, 1921
