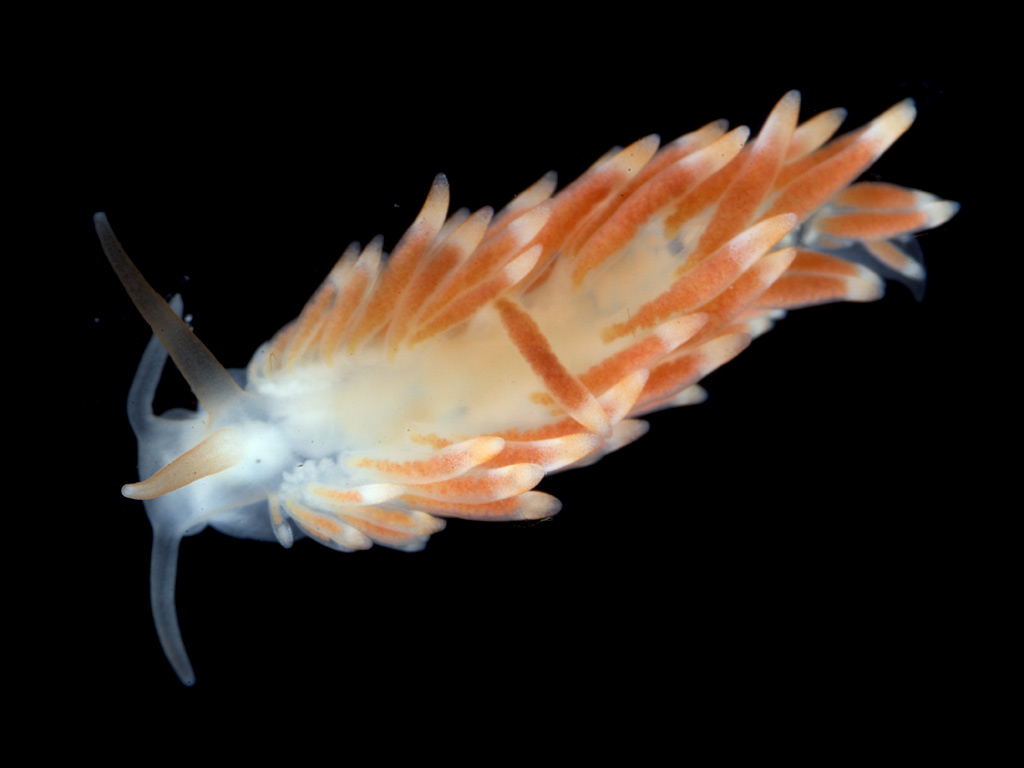
- The nudibranch Catriona aurantia, Gulen Dive Resort, Norway.

Scientific classification
- Kingdom: Animalia
- Phylum: Mollusca
- Class: Gastropoda
- Order: Nudibranchia
- Suborder: Aeolidacea
- Family: Trinchesiidae
- Genus: Catriona
- Species: C. aurantia

Binomial name
- Catriona aurantia (Alder & Hancock, 1842)

Synonyms
- Aeolis bellula Lovén, 1846; Cuthona aurantia Alder & Hancock, 1842; Eolis aurantia Alder & Hancock, 1842; Eolis aurantiaca Alder & Hancock, 1851; Tenellia aurantia Alder & Hancock, 1842

= Catriona aurantia =

Species of gastropod

Catriona aurantia is a species of sea slug, an aeolid nudibranch, a marine gastropod mollusk in the family Trinchesiidae. It was incorrectly synonymised with Catriona gymnota from the Western Atlantic but shown to be a distinct species by DNA analysis.

== Distribution ==
This species was described from Whitley, on the North Sea coast of England.

== Description ==
This species has a translucent white body and slightly swollen cerata. The digestive gland is orange pink in colour and the tips of the cerata have a broad white band of tiny epidermal glands. In larger specimens the rhinophores develop a pale orange suffusion. The foot is broad and rounded anteriorly. Large individuals may exceed 20 mm in length.

== Habitat ==
Feeds on the hydroid Tubularia larynx. Individuals are thought to feed by eating through the stems of the hydroid rather than on the polyps. Usually found in exposed places, in strong tidal streams, and in shallow water, from 0 m to 20 m depth. The spawn consists of lozenge-shaped packets of eggs.
