= Kleptopredation =

Form of feeding

Kleptopredation is a form of feeding in which a predator eats prey after the prey has hunted, consuming both the prey and its recent meal. It is a specific type of kleptoparasitism. The term was first used in an article published in the journal Biology Letters.

Kleptopredation has been observed in nudibranchs, who may target hydroid polyps that have recently eaten zooplankton.

In some organisms, such as benthic mollusc, kleptopredation is a combination of kleptoparasitic competition and direct predation.
