= Trinchesia pinnifera =

Scientific classification
- Kingdom: Animalia
- Phylum: Mollusca
- Class: Gastropoda
- Order: Nudibranchia
- Suborder: Aeolidacea
- Family: Trinchesiidae
- Genus: Trinchesia
- Species: T. pinnifera

Binomial name
- Trinchesia pinnifera (Baba, 1949)

Synonyms
- Catriona pinnifera Baba, 1949; Cratena pinnifera Baba, 1949; Cuthona pinnifera (Baba, 1949)

Species of sea slug

Trinchesia pinnifera is a species of sea slug, an aeolid nudibranch, a marine gastropod mollusc in the family Trinchesiidae.

== Distribution ==
This species was described from Sagami Bay, Japan. It was subsequently reported from Kii Peninsula, Osaka Bay, Toyama Bay and Tsuruga Bay.

== Description ==
This Trinchesia is a white animal with a single, broken, band of orange-yellow below the tip of the cerata.
