= Feathery hydroid =

Feathery hydroid is a common name for several hydroids and may refer to:

- Aglaophenia
- Plumularia
- Pycnotheca mirabilis
- Sertularia
