= Sertularella acutidentata =

Scientific classification
- Kingdom: Animalia
- Phylum: Cnidaria
- Class: Hydrozoa
- Order: Leptothecata
- Family: Sertularellidae
- Genus: Sertularella
- Species: S. acutidentata

Binomial name
- Sertularella acutidentata Billard, 1919

Species of hydrozoan

Sertularella acutidentata is a branching colonial hydroid in the family Sertulariidae. It forms delicate, tree-like colonies and lives in marine environments, where it feeds on tiny plankton using stinging cells.

== Description ==
This hydroid grows to 4.5 cm.

== Distribution ==
Described from eastern Indonesia; collected by the Dutch Siboga Expedition.
