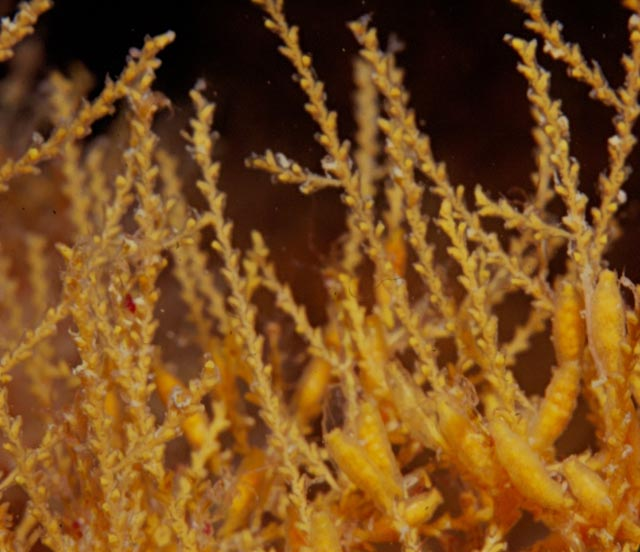
- Planar hydroid with reproductive bodies

Scientific classification
- Kingdom: Animalia
- Phylum: Cnidaria
- Class: Hydrozoa
- Order: Leptothecata
- Family: Sertularellidae
- Genus: Sertularella
- Species: S. arbuscula

Binomial name
- Sertularella arbuscula (Lamouroux, 1816)

= Planar hydroid =

Species of hydrozoan

The planar hydroid (Sertularella arbuscula) is a branching colonial hydroid in the family Sertulariidae.

== Description ==
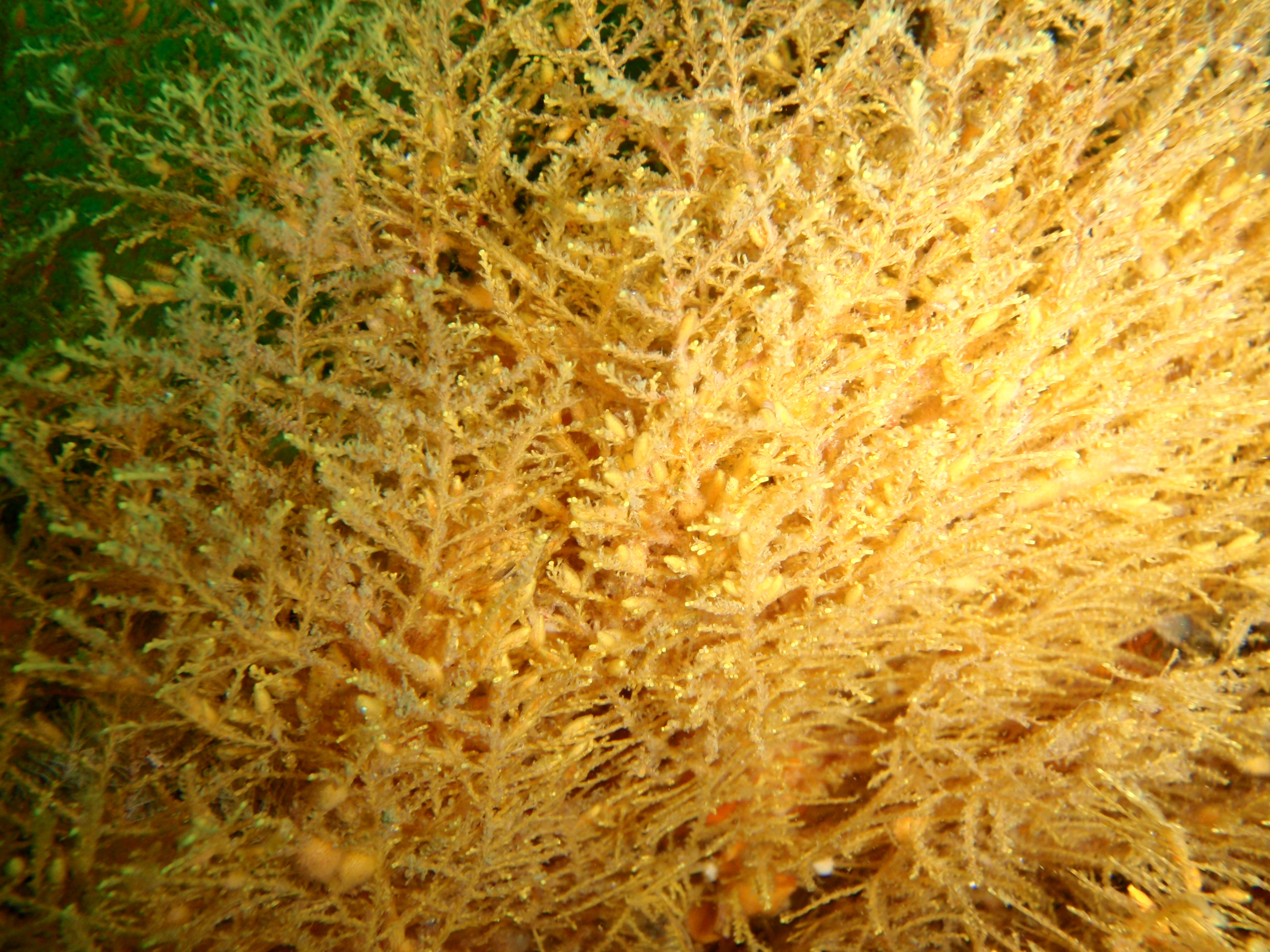
Planar hyfroids at the wreck of the SAS Pietermaritzburg in False Bay

Planar hydroids are bright yellow and branched in one plane with a zig-zag appearance to the stems. The colonies usually grow up to 30 cm in height.

== Distribution ==
This colonial animal is found off the southern African coast from Saldanha Bay to central Mozambique, as well as off Vema Seamount, through the Indian Ocean and off Australia, down to 219m under water.

== Ecology ==
Planar hydroids live on vertical subtidal rock faces perpendicular to normal water flow. They feed on plankton.
