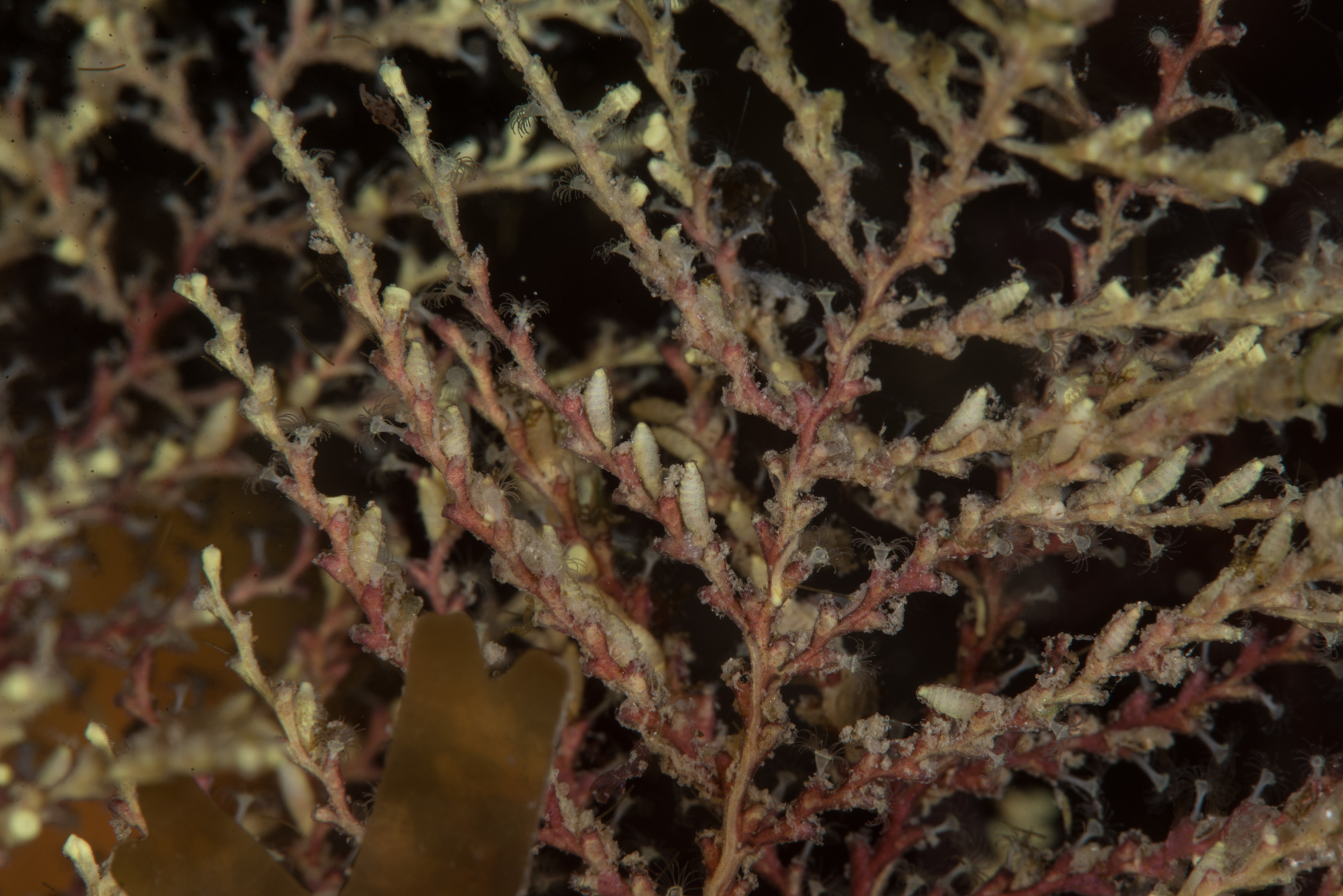
- The hydroid Sertularella gayi, fertile.

Scientific classification
- Kingdom: Animalia
- Phylum: Cnidaria
- Class: Hydrozoa
- Order: Leptothecata
- Family: Sertularellidae
- Genus: Sertularella
- Species: S. gayi

Binomial name
- Sertularella gayi (Lamouroux, 1821)

= Sertularella gayi =

Species of hydrozoan

Sertularella gayi is a branching colonial hydroid in the family Sertulariidae.

== Description ==
The main stems of the colony are bright yellow and relatively thick, composed of several fibres adhering to each other at the base, becoming monosiphonic with alternating zooids in the upper part of the colony. The side branches are approximately alternate and support the hydrothecae which are regularly alternate, one to each internode. As in Sertularella polyzonias they are bulbous in the basal region, and the margin is quadridentate. The operculum consists of four triangular flaps. The gonothecae are oval shaped, and the upper portion has transverse ridges whilst the lower portion is smooth. The aperture is bidentate.

== Distribution ==
The type locality for this species is the English Channel coast of France, from Pirou and Anneville-sur-Mer. North-East Atlantic, shallow sublittoral to considerable depths.
