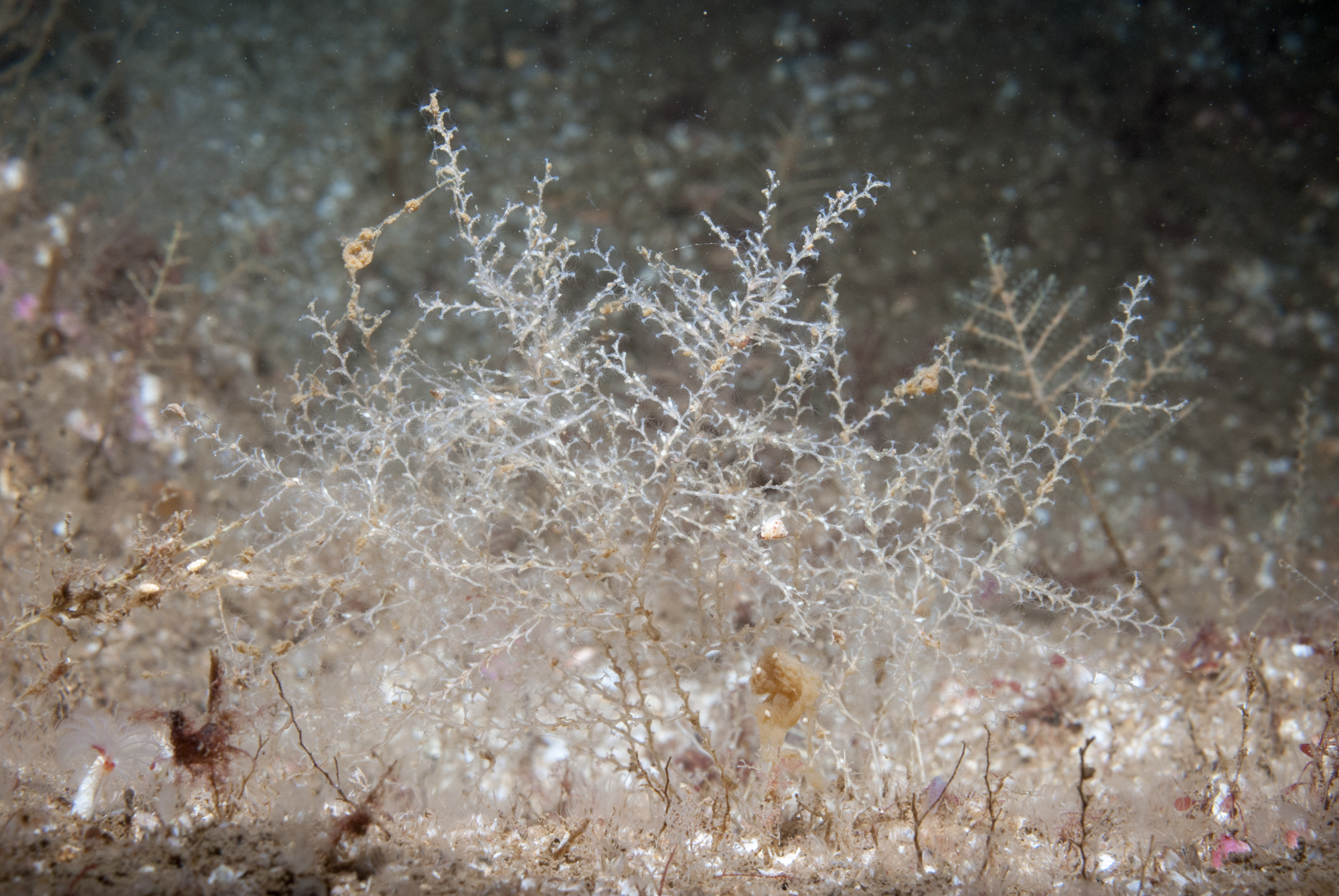
- The hydroid Sertularella polyzonias, Mull of Kintyre, Scotland.

Scientific classification
- Kingdom: Animalia
- Phylum: Cnidaria
- Class: Hydrozoa
- Order: Leptothecata
- Family: Sertularellidae
- Genus: Sertularella
- Species: S. polyzonias

Binomial name
- Sertularella polyzonias (Linnaeus, 1758)

= Sertularella polyzonias =

Species of hydrozoan

Sertularella polyzonias is a branching colonial hydroid in the family Sertulariidae.

== Description ==
This hydroid branches rather sparsely and irregularly compared with Sertularella gayi. The main stems and side branches are thin, wavy, and of a pale straw colour. As in all Sertularella species, the side branches support alternate hydrothecae, one to each internode. The hydrothecae are bulbous at the base and become narrower towards the rim which has four cusps, and an operculum that consists of four triangular flaps. The gonothecae are generally ovate in shape and slightly rugose in texture. A raised tubular structure with four vertically projecting denticles surrounds the aperture. Although the male and female gonothecae are similar in shape the male is considerably smaller and is white, whilst the female is yellow in colour. Colonies are typically 40–50 mm in height.

== Distribution ==
Reported widely from the Atlantic Ocean and Mediterranean Sea, shallow sublittoral to considerable depths.
