= Sertularella inconstans =

Scientific classification
- Kingdom: Animalia
- Phylum: Cnidaria
- Class: Hydrozoa
- Order: Leptothecata
- Family: Sertularellidae
- Genus: Sertularella
- Species: S. inconstans

Binomial name
- Sertularella inconstans Billard, 1919

Species of hydrozoan

Sertularella inconstans is a branching colonial hydroid in the family Sertulariidae.

== Description ==
This hydroid grows to 1.5 cm.

== Distribution ==
Described from eastern Indonesia; collected by the Dutch Siboga Expedition.
