= Sertularella ellisii =

Scientific classification
- Kingdom: Animalia
- Phylum: Cnidaria
- Class: Hydrozoa
- Order: Leptothecata
- Family: Sertularellidae
- Genus: Sertularella
- Species: S. ellisii

Binomial name
- Sertularella ellisii (Deshayes & Milne Edwards, 1836)

Synonyms
- Sertularia ellisi Deshayes & Milne Edwards, 1836

Species of hydrozoan

Sertularella ellisii is a branching colonial hydroid in the family Sertulariidae.

== Description ==
This hydroid grows as a sparsely branched colony to 3 cm in height.

== Distribution ==
Described from the north-east Atlantic Ocean.
