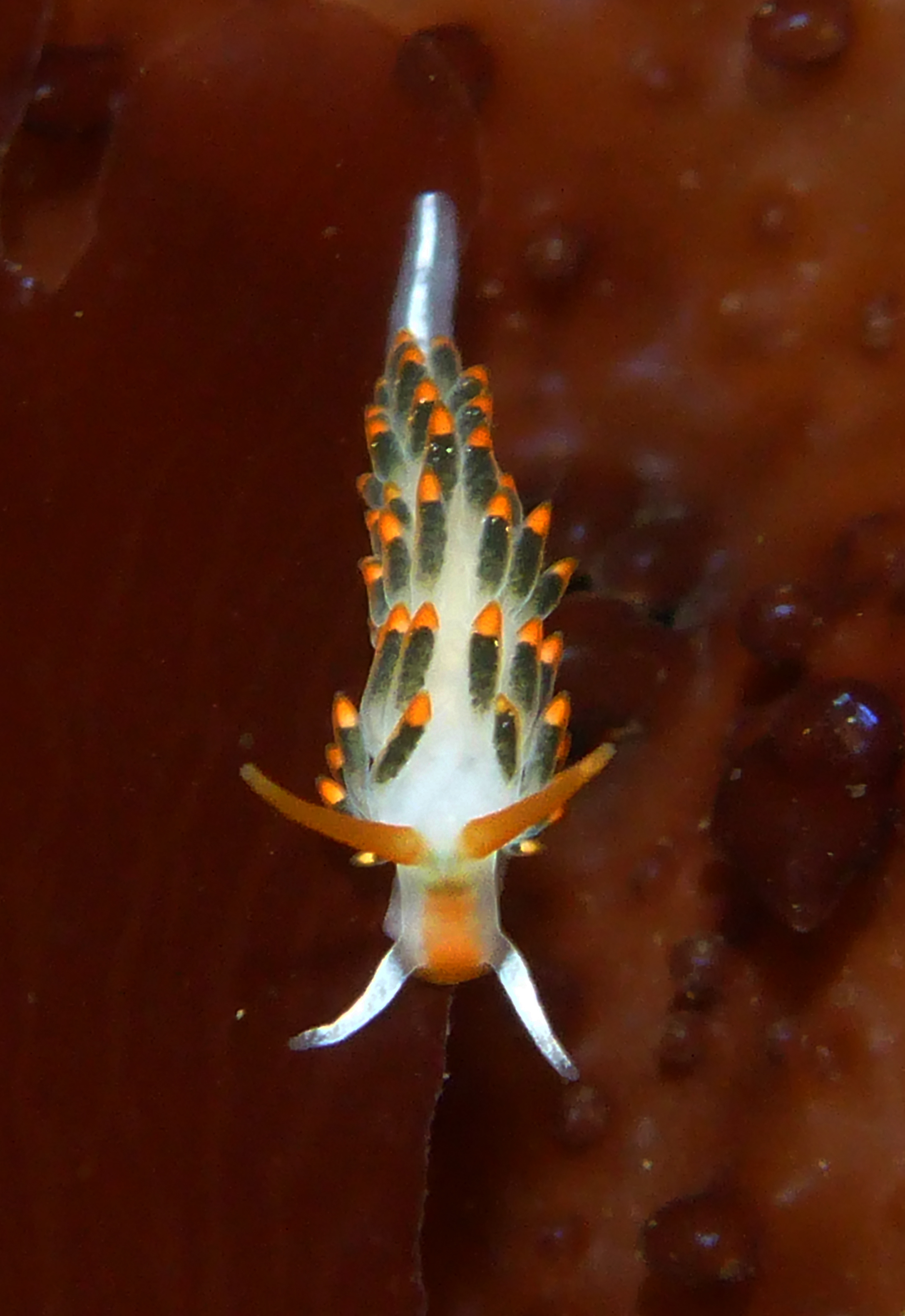

Scientific classification
- Kingdom: Animalia
- Phylum: Mollusca
- Class: Gastropoda
- Order: Nudibranchia
- Suborder: Aeolidacea
- Family: Trinchesiidae
- Genus: Diaphoreolis
- Species: D. lagunae

Binomial name
- Diaphoreolis lagunae (O'Donoghue, 1926)

Synonyms
- Cratena rutila MacFarland, 1966; Cuthona lagunae (O’Donoghue, 1926); Hervia lagunae O’Donoghue, 1926; Tenellia lagunae O'Donoghue, 1926

= Diaphoreolis lagunae =

Species of gastropod

Diaphoreolis lagunae, common name orange-face cuthona, is a species of sea slug, an aeolid nudibranch, a marine gastropod mollusc in the family Trinchesiidae.

== Distribution ==
This species has been recorded along the Eastern Pacific coastline of North America from Curry County, Oregon, United States to Bahía Tortugas, Mulegé Municipality, Baja California, Mexico.

== Ecology ==
Diaphoreolis lagunae feeds on the hydroid Sertularella turgida, family Sertulariidae.
