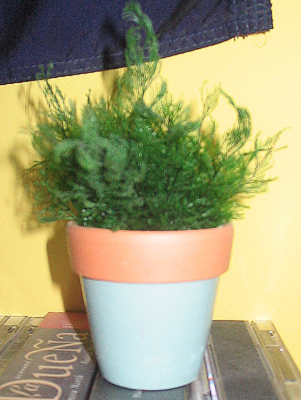
- A "potted" air fern
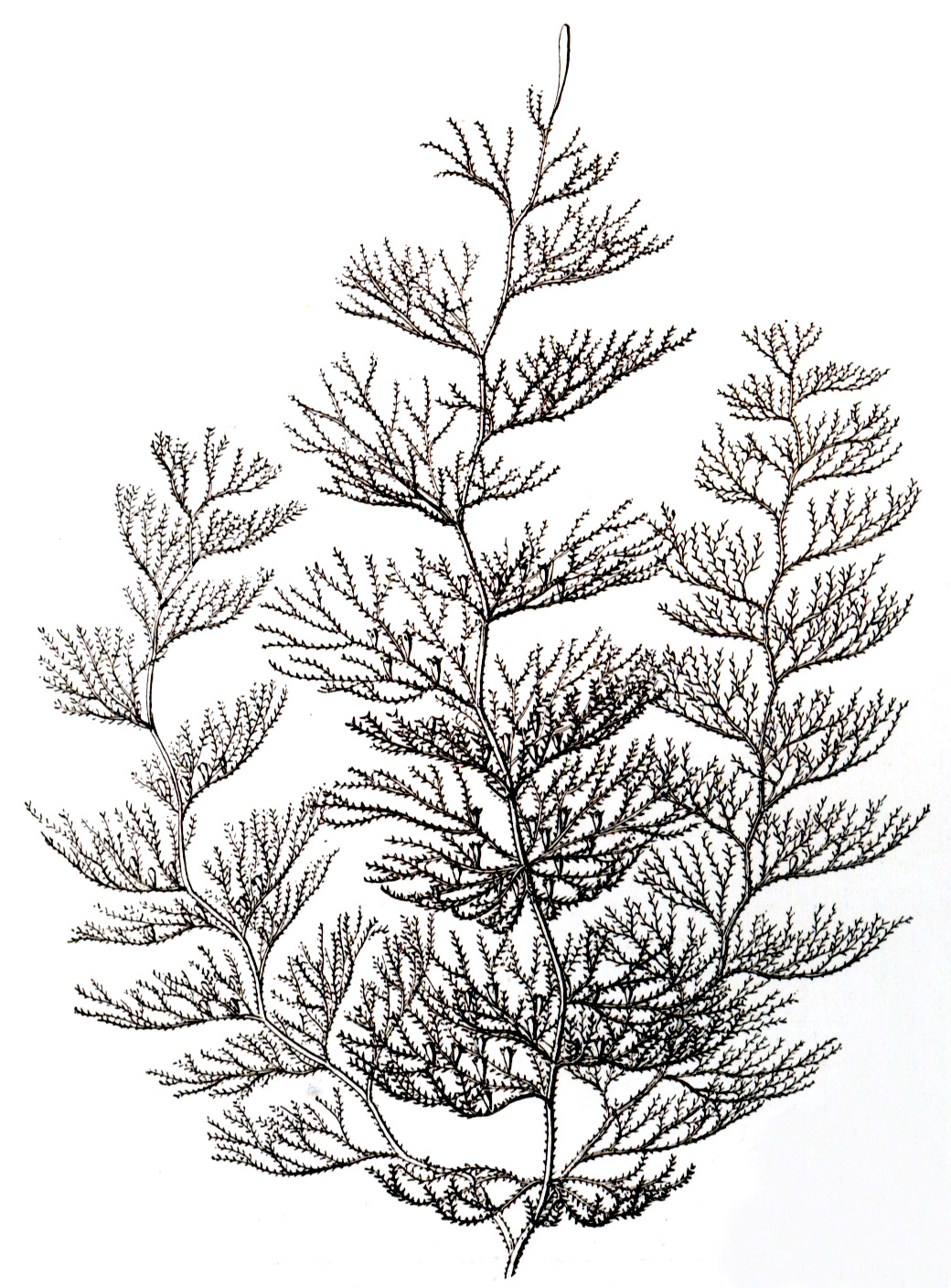

Scientific classification
- Domain: Eukaryota
- Kingdom: Animalia
- Phylum: Cnidaria
- Class: Hydrozoa
- Order: Leptothecata
- Family: Sertulariidae
- Genus: Sertularia
- Species: S. argentea

Binomial name
- Sertularia argentea Linnaeus, 1758

Synonyms
- Sertularia cupressina argentea (Linnaeus, 1758); Thuiaria argentea (Linnaeus, 1758)

= Air fern =

Species of hydrozoan

The air fern (Sertularia argentea) is a dead and dried colony of hydrozoans, a species of marine animal in the family Sertulariidae related to corals and jellyfish.

Air ferns are typically dyed green and sold as a curiosity, as a decorative "indoor plant"; the same skeletons of former colonies of hydroids are sold in their natural dried state as the sea fir and Neptune plant as underwater decorations for aquariums.

== Description ==
Despite a superficial resemblance to plants, air ferns are actually animal skeletons or shells of marine hydroids of the class Hydrozoa, phylum Cnidaria. The dried colonies are often dyed green, but the coloring will dissolve when soaked in water. Undyed ferns are sometimes labeled as "Neptune plants".

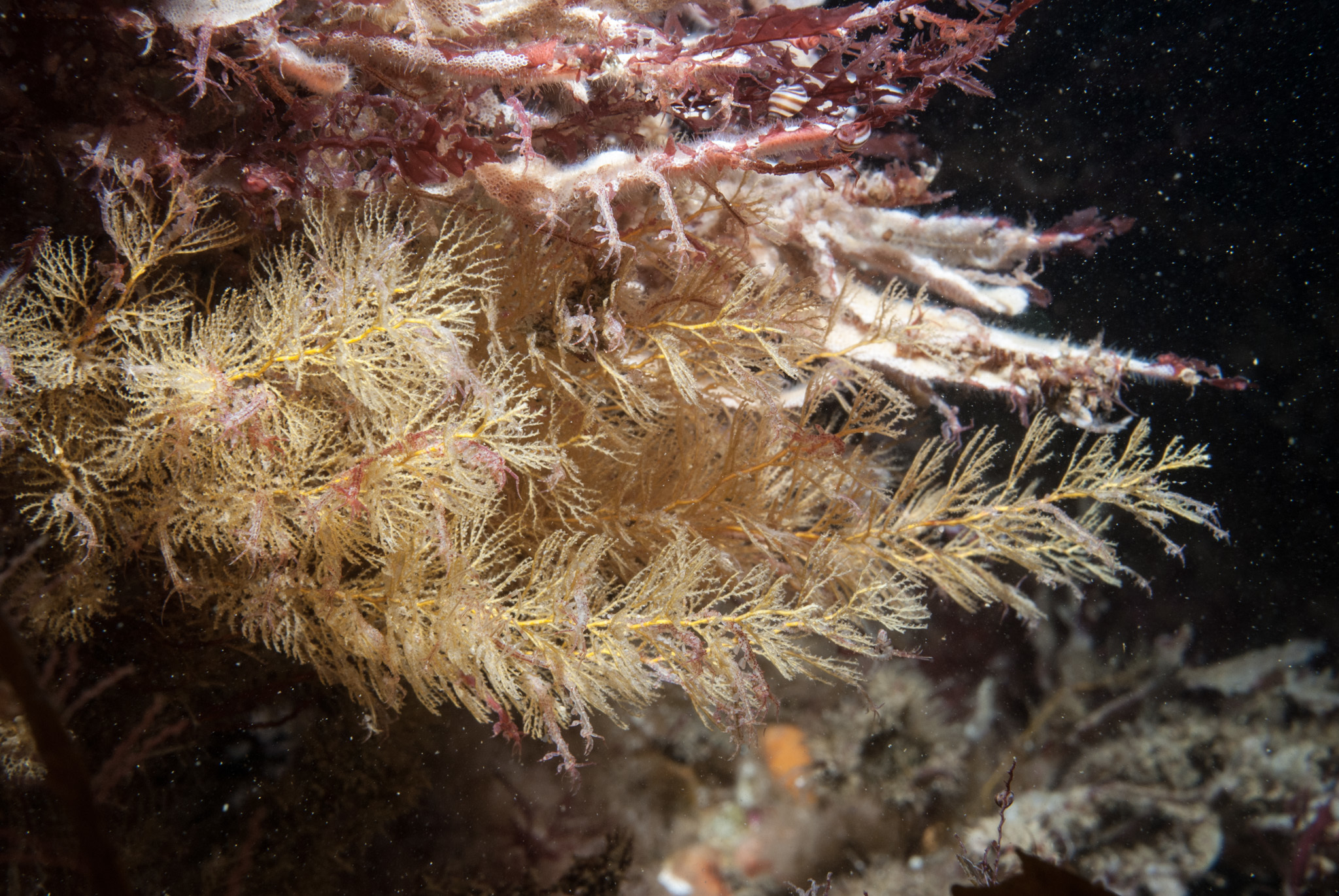
Colony of Sertularia argentea used in an aquarium

The fernlike branches of S. argentea are composed of many small, chitinous chambers where individual animals once lived. When the colony was alive, a polyp with numerous tentacles occupied each of the chambers, called hydrotheca.

Sometimes dried bryozoa are sold as "air ferns."

Most commercially sold air ferns are collected as a by-product by trawlers in the North Sea.
