= S. crassa =

S. crassa may refer to:

- Sarcosphaera crassa, the only species in the Sarcosphaera genus of fungi
- Scolopendra crassa, species of centipede
- Shorea crassa, species of plant
- Strigocossus crassa, species of moth
- Sarcohyla crassa, species of frog in the family Hylidae
- Sertularella crassa, branching colonial hydroid
- Sphenophryne crassa, species of frog in the family Microhylidae
- Sannantha crassa, species in the myrtle family
