= Sea spleenwort =

Sea spleenwort may refer to:

- a species of fern, Asplenium marinum
- a species of hydroid, Thuiaria articulata
