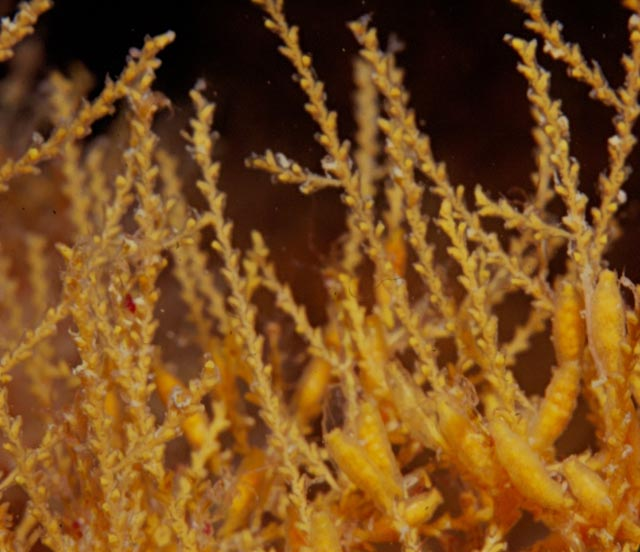

Scientific classification
- Kingdom: Animalia
- Phylum: Cnidaria
- Class: Hydrozoa
- Order: Leptothecata
- Family: Sertularellidae
- Genus: Sertularella; Gray, 1848

Species
- See text

Synonyms
- Ellisia Westendorp, 1843

= Sertularella =

Genus of cnidarians

Sertularella is a genus of hydroids in the family Sertulariidae.

== Species ==
The following species are classed in this genus:

- Sertularella acutidentata Billard, 1919
- Sertularella africana Stechow, 1919
- Sertularella agulhenis Millard, 1964
- Sertularella albida Kirchenpauer, 1884
- Sertularella allmani Hartlaub, 1901
- Sertularella ampullacea Fraser, 1938
- Sertularella anguina Vervoort, 1993
- Sertularella annulata (Allman, 1888)
- Sertularella antarctica Hartlaub, 1901
- Sertularella arbuscula (Lamouroux, 1816)
- Sertularella areyi Nutting, 1904
- Sertularella asymmetra Galea & Schories, 2014
- Sertularella avrilia Watson, 1973
- Sertularella billardi Vervoort, 1993
- Sertularella bipectinata Vervoort, 1993
- Sertularella blanconae El Beshbeeshy, 2011
- Sertularella brandti Linko, 1912
- Sertularella calderi Galea, 2013
- Sertularella capensis Millard, 1957
- Sertularella catena (Allman, 1888)
- Sertularella cervicula Choong, 2015
- Sertularella clarkii Mereschkowsky, 1878
- Sertularella clausa (Allman, 1888)
- Sertularella complexa Nutting, 1904
- Sertularella conella Stechow, 1920
- Sertularella congregata Millard, 1964
- Sertularella conica Allman, 1877
- Sertularella contorta Kirchenpauer, 1884
- Sertularella coronata Choong, 2015
- Sertularella costata Leloup, 1940
- Sertularella crassa Billard, 1919
- Sertularella crassicaulis (Heller, 1868)
- Sertularella crassiuscula Bale, 1924
- Sertularella craticula Naumov, 1960
- Sertularella crenulata Nutting, 1905
- Sertularella cruzensis El Beshbeeshy, 2011
- Sertularella cubica García Aguirre & Gonzalez, 1980
- Sertularella curta Galea & Schories, 2014
- Sertularella curvitheca Galea & Schories, 2012
- Sertularella decipiens Billard, 1919
- Sertularella diaphana (Allman, 1885)
- Sertularella dubia Billard, 1907
- Sertularella ellisii (Deshayes & Milne Edwards, 1836)
- Sertularella erratum Vervoort & Watson, 2003
- Sertularella exigua Thompson, 1879
- Sertularella exilis Fraser, 1938
- Sertularella flabellum (Allman, 1885)
- Sertularella folliformis Galea, 2016
- Sertularella fraseri Galea, 2010
- Sertularella fuegonensis El Beshbeeshy, 2011
- Sertularella fusiformis (Hincks, 1861)
- Sertularella fusoides Stechow, 1926
- Sertularella gaudichaudi (Lamouroux, 1824)
- Sertularella gayi (Lamouroux, 1821)
- Sertularella geodiae Totton, 1930
- Sertularella gigantea Hincks, 1874
- Sertularella gilchristi Millard, 1964
- Sertularella goliathus Stechow, 1923
- Sertularella helenae Vervoort, 1993
- Sertularella hermanosensis El Beshbeeshy, 2012
- Sertularella humilis Fraser, 1943
- Sertularella implexa (Allman, 1888)
- Sertularella inabai Stechow, 1913
- Sertularella incisa Fraser, 1938
- Sertularella inconstans Billard, 1919
- Sertularella integra Allman, 1876
- Sertularella japonica Stechow, 1926
- Sertularella juanfernandezensis Galea et al., 2017
- Sertularella keiensis Billard, 1925
- Sertularella kerguelensis Allman, 1876
- Sertularella lagenoides Stechow, 1919
- Sertularella leiocarpa (Allman, 1888)
- Sertularella leiocarpoides Vervoort, 1993
- Sertularella levigata Stechow, 1931
- Sertularella magna Nutting, 1904
- Sertularella maureenae Choong, Calder & Brinckmann-Voss, 2012
- Sertularella mediterranea Hartlaub, 1901
- Sertularella megastoma Nutting, 1904
- Sertularella megista Stechow, 1923
- Sertularella microtheca Leloup, 1974
- Sertularella mirabilis Jäderholm, 1896
- Sertularella miurensis Stechow, 1921
- Sertularella mixta Galea & Schories, 2012
- Sertularella mutsuensis Stechow, 1931
- Sertularella mytila Watson, 2011
- Sertularella natalensis Millard, 1968
- Sertularella novaecaledoniae Vervoort, 1993
- Sertularella novarae Marktanner-Turneretscher, 1890
- Sertularella nuttingi Billard, 1914
- Sertularella oblonga Galea, Häussermann & Försterra, 2017
- Sertularella obtusa Stechow, 1931
- Sertularella ornata Broch, 1933
- Sertularella pacifica Choong, 2015
- Sertularella patagonica (D'Orbigny, 1846)
- Sertularella paucicostata Vervoort, 1993
- Sertularella pauciramosa Galea & Schories, 2014
- Sertularella peculiaris (Leloup, 1935)
- Sertularella pinnata (Lamouroux, 1816)
- Sertularella plicata Galea, 2016
- Sertularella polyzonias (Linnaeus, 1758)
- Sertularella producta (Allman, 1888)
- Sertularella pseudocatena Galea, 2016
- Sertularella pseudocostata Vervoort, 1993
- Sertularella pulchra Stechow, 1923
- Sertularella quadrata Nutting, 1895
- Sertularella quadridens (Bale, 1884)
- Sertularella quadrifida Hartlaub, 1901
- Sertularella quinquelaminata Stechow, 1931
- Sertularella recta Galea & Schories, 2017
- Sertularella robusta Coughtrey, 1876
- Sertularella robustissima Galea, Häussermann & Försterra, 2017
- Sertularella robustoides Mulder & Trebilcock, 1915
- Sertularella rugosa (Linnaeus, 1758)
- Sertularella sacciformis Choong, 2015
- Sertularella sagamina Stechow, 1921
- Sertularella sanmatiasensis El Beshbeeshy, 2011
- Sertularella simplex (Hutton, 1873)
- Sertularella sinensis Jäderholm, 1896
- Sertularella spinosa Kirchenpauer, 1884
- Sertularella spirifera Stechow, 1931
- Sertularella splendida Galea, 2016
- Sertularella stolonifera Vervoort & Watson, 2003
- Sertularella subantarctica Galea, 2017
- Sertularella tanneri Nutting, 1904
- Sertularella tasmanica Bale, 1915
- Sertularella tenella (Alder, 1857)
- Sertularella tilesii Kirchenpauer, 1884
- Sertularella tricincta Billard, 1939
- Sertularella tronconica Galea, 2016
- Sertularella tubulosa Galea, 2016
- Sertularella undulitheca Vervoort, 1959
- Sertularella unituba Calder, 1991
- Sertularella valdiviae Stechow, 1923
- Sertularella vervoorti El Beshbeeshy, 2011
- Sertularella wallacei Stechow, 1926
- Sertularella whitei Rees & Vervoort, 1987
- Sertularella xantha Stechow, 1923
- Sertularella zenkevitchi Naumov, 1960
