= Sertularia gracillima =

Scientific classification
- Domain: Eukaryota
- Kingdom: Animalia
- Phylum: Cnidaria
- Class: Hydrozoa
- Order: Leptothecata
- Family: Sertulariidae
- Genus: Sertularia
- Species: S. gracillima

Binomial name
- Sertularia gracillima Bale, 1926

Species of hydrozoan

Sertularia gracillima is a hydrozoa described by VS Bale in 1926. Sertularia gracillima is in the genus Sertularia and family sertulariidae.
