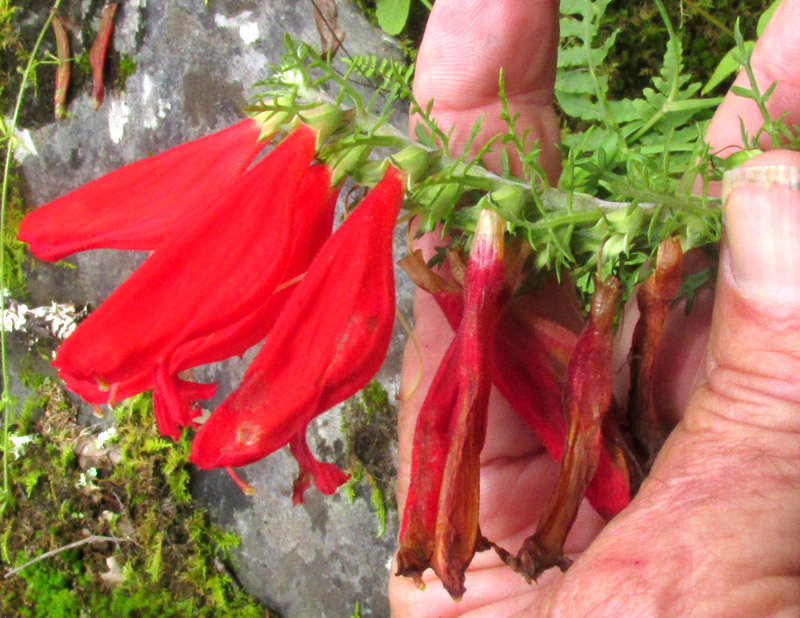
- Lamourouxia multifida inflorescence

Scientific classification
- Kingdom: Plantae
- Clade: Embryophytes
- Clade: Tracheophytes
- Clade: Spermatophytes
- Clade: Angiosperms
- Clade: Eudicots
- Clade: Asterids
- Order: Lamiales
- Family: Orobanchaceae
- Genus: Lamourouxia
- Species: L. multifida

Binomial name
- Lamourouxia multifida Kunth 1818

Synonyms
- Lamourouxia grandifloraBenth. ex Linden (1855); Lamourouxia laciniata M.Martens & Galeotti (1845); Lamourouxia laciniata var. pilosa M.Martens & Galeotti (1845); Lamourouxia multifida var. grandiflora Benth. (1846); Lamourouxia pringlei Gand. (1919); Lamourouxia tepicana (M.E.Jones) Pennell (1945); Pedicularis tepicana M.E.Jones (1929)

= Lamourouxia multifida =

Species of plant

Lamourouxia multifida, with no commonly accepted English name, is a mostly Mexican species of perennial herbaceous plant', which is partly parasitic on the roots of other plants. It belongs to the family Orobanchaceae.

== Description ==
Lamourouxia multifida is a handsome wildflower exhibiting the following features:

- Usually its stems are unbranched, and reaching up to 1.5 m (4.9 ft).
- Leaves up to 6 cm (2.4 in) rise opposite one another with blades twice divided (bipinnate) into slender segments.
- Flowers with bright red corollas are of irregular form (zygomorphic) and up to 5 cm (2.0 in) long; there are 4 fertile stamens, and the style is longer than the corola.
- Fruits are capsules up to 11 mm (0.4 in).

== Distribution ==
Lamourouxia multifida occurs throughout most of upland Mexico, into Guatemala.

== Habitat ==
In the Valley of Mexico, Lamourouxia multifida inhabits pine-oak forest and grasslands at elevations of 2,250–3,450 metres (7,380–11,320 ft). On this page, images show an individual growing on the face of a roadcut through limestone at an elevation of about 2,300 metres (7,500 ft).

== Human uses ==
=== In traditional medicine ===
In the Mexican state of Michoacán, Lamourouxia multifida is used by traditional healers during limpias in order to bring the body, mind and spirit back into balance, especially by eliminating negative energies. In the state of Morelos the inflorescence is recognized as medicinal.

=== As an ornamental ===
Sometimes Lamourouxia multifida is used to adorn altars during religious ceremonies.

=== In beekeeping ===
In various Mexican states it is known to attract honeybees. In fact, one of the common names in Spanish for Lamourouxia multifida is Chupamiel Milhojas, roughly translatable to "thousand-leaf honey-sucker".

== Ecology ==
Rivoli's hummingbird, Eugenes fulgens, and Lucifer sheartail, Calothorax lucifer, have been documented visiting Lamourouxia multifida.

In an area of dry scrubland in the highland Trans-Mexican Volcanic Belt it's been documented that hummingbirds visit Lamourouxia multifida flowers in August, then from September into November shift to flowers of Lamourouxia dasyantha. Another study, also in the volcanic belt, at Jardines del Pedregal, Mexico City, indicates that the flowering time of Lamourouxia multifida is from early September to mid November.

== Taxonomy ==
Aimé Bonpland and Alexander von Humboldt first scientifically collected Lamourouxia multifida at a temperate elevation between Guanajuato and nearby Santa Rosa de la Sierra, in September 1803. In 1818 it was formally described by Carl Sigismund Kunth.

=== Etymology ===
The genus name Lamourouxia is a New Latin construct honoring Jean Vincent Félix Lamouroux, an early Professor of Natural History in Caen, France.

The species name multifida is from Latin multifidus, meaning "much divided", in reference to the leaves' many slender divisions.

== Gallery ==
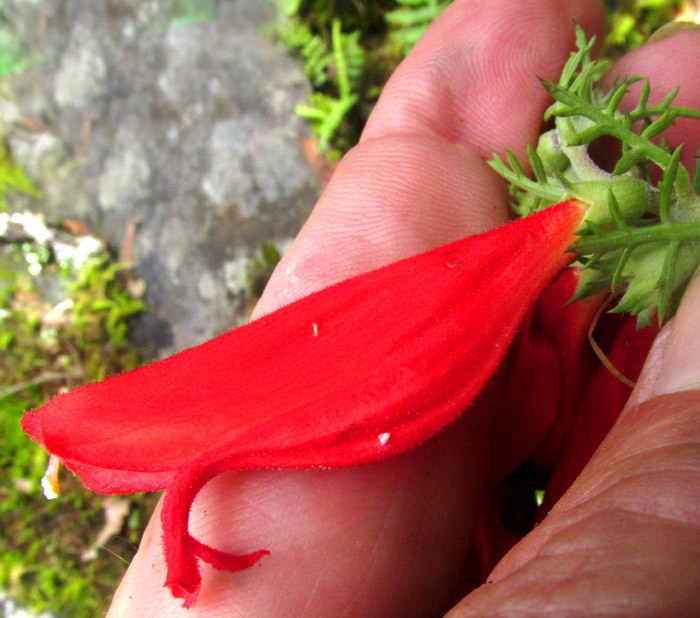
Lamourouxia multifida flower side view

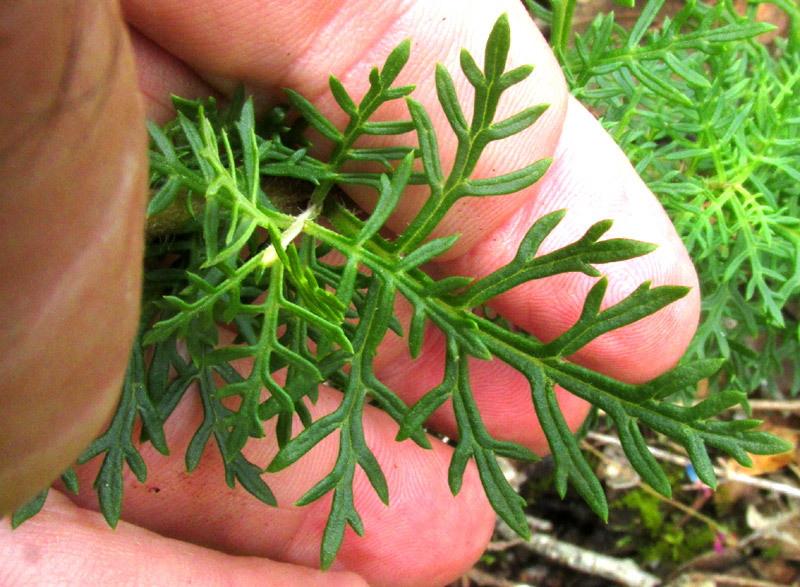
Lamourouxia multifida much divided leaf

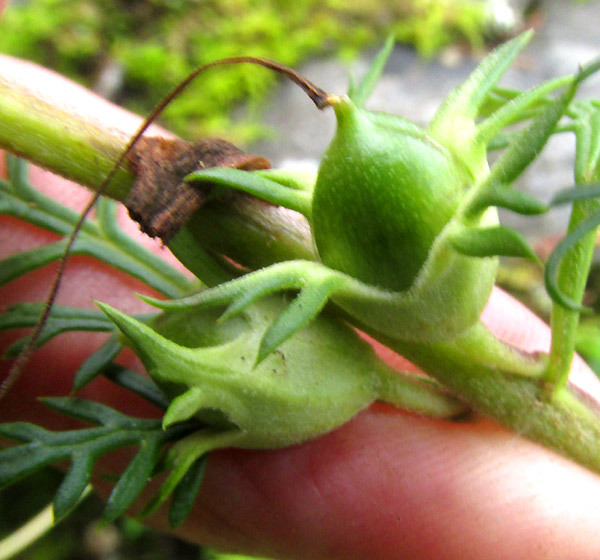
Lamourouxia multifida immature capsular fruits

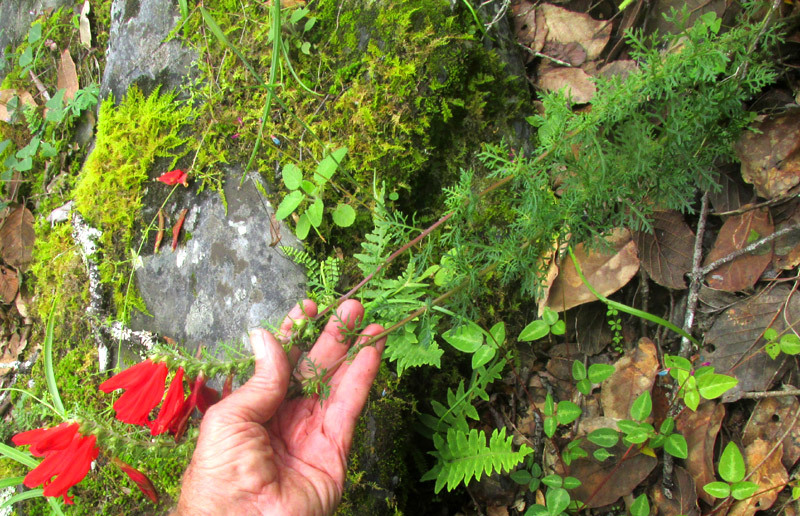
Lamourouxia multifida habitat on the limestone wall of a roadcut
