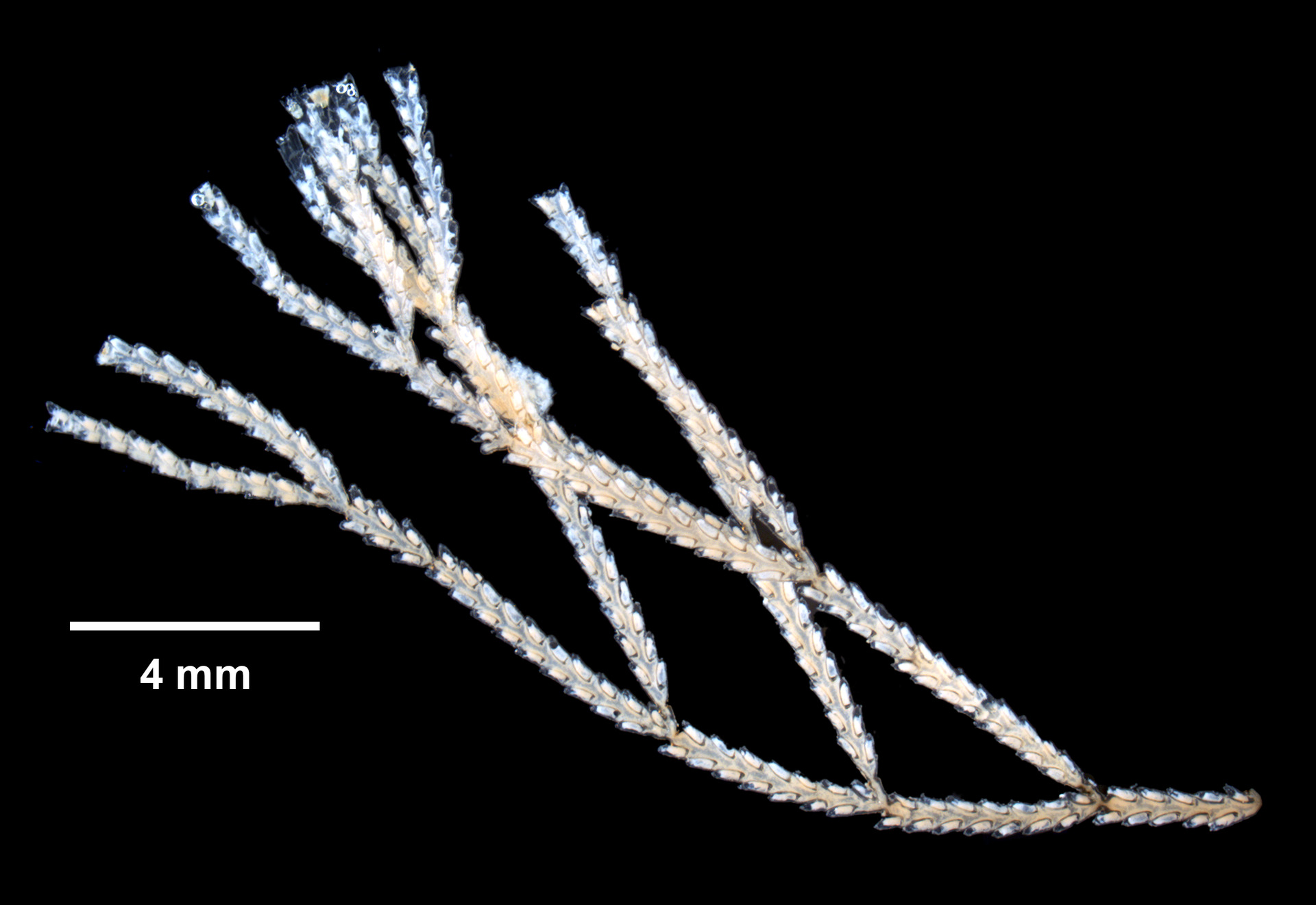

Scientific classification
- Kingdom: Animalia
- Phylum: Cnidaria
- Class: Hydrozoa
- Order: Leptothecata
- Family: Sertulariidae
- Genus: Thuiaria
- Species: T. thuja

Binomial name
- Thuiaria thuja Linnaeus, 1758

Synonyms
- Sertularia thuja Linnaeus, 1758; Biseriaria thuja Linnaeus, 1758; Thujaria thuja Leloup, 1933

= Thuiaria thuja =

Species of hydroid

Thuiaria thuja, commonly known as the bottle-brush hydroid, is a species of Thuiaria in the Sertulariidae family.

== Distribution ==
Thuiaria thuja is a circumpolar species, found in high-latitude regions, like the United Kingdom, Ireland, Norway, Canada, the United States, and Russia; and low-latitude regions, like Namibia.
