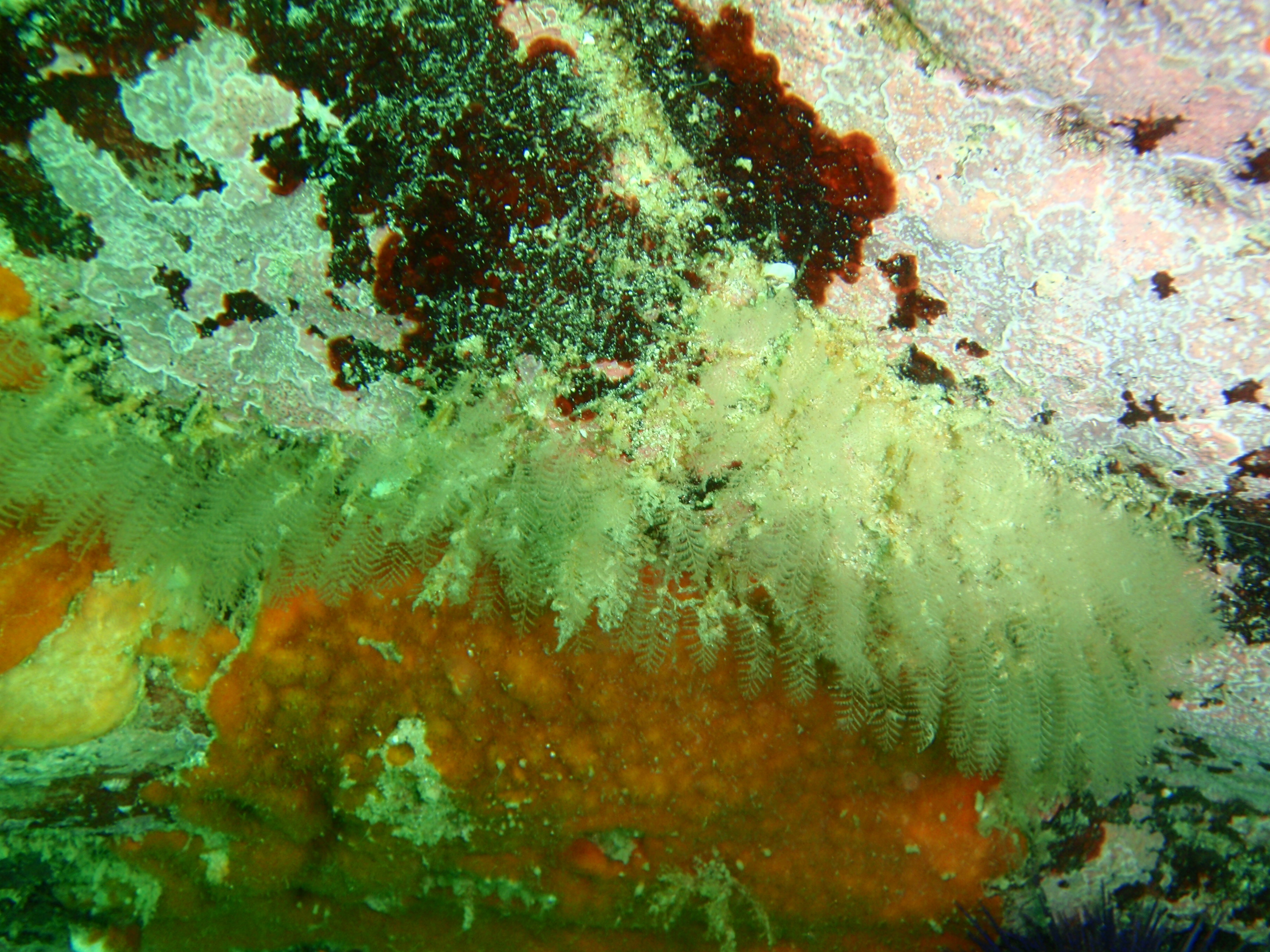

Scientific classification
- Kingdom: Animalia
- Phylum: Cnidaria
- Class: Hydrozoa
- Order: Leptothecata
- Superfamily: Plumularioidea
- Family: Kirchenpaueriidae; Stechow, 1921

= Kirchenpaueriidae =

Family of hydrozoans

Kirchenpaueriidae is a family of hydrozoans in the superfamily Plumularioidea. Their hydrocladia are characteristically set in an alternating fashion as one progresses along the stems, forming two neat rows except in Oswaldella laertesi, which has three such rows. The alternating placement of the hydrocladia can be used to distinguish them from the Plumulariidae which may look superficially similar.

There are six genera recognized in the family Kirchenpaueriidae:

- Halicornopsis
- Kirchenpaueria
- Ophinella
- Oswaldella
- Pycnotheca
- Wimveria
