= Kirchenpaueria =

Scientific classification
- Domain: Eukaryota
- Kingdom: Animalia
- Phylum: Cnidaria
- Class: Hydrozoa
- Order: Leptothecata
- Family: Kirchenpaueriidae
- Genus: Kirchenpaueria; Jickeli, 1883

Genus of hydrozoa

Kirchenpaueria is a genus of cnidarians belonging to the family Kirchenpaueriidae.

The genus has cosmopolitan distribution.

== Species ==
Species:

- Kirchenpaueria altitheca (Nutting, 1900)
- Kirchenpaueria bellarensis (Watson, 2011)
- Kirchenpaueria bonneviae (Billard, 1906)
- Kirchenpaueria bonnevieae (Billard, 1906)
- Kirchenpaueria curvata (Jäderholm, 1904)
- Kirchenpaueria fragilis (Hamann, 1882)
- Kirchenpaueria galapagensis (Calder, Mallinson, Collins & Hickman, 2003)
- Kirchenpaueria goodei (Nutting, 1900)
- Kirchenpaueria halecioides (Alder, 1859)
- Kirchenpaueria microtheca Naumov, 1960
- Kirchenpaueria moneroni (Naumov, 1960)
- Kirchenpaueria oligopyxis Kirchenpauer, 1876
- Kirchenpaueria paucinema (Fraser, 1940)
- Kirchenpaueria pinnata (Linnaeus, 1758)
- Kirchenpaueria spec (Linnaeus, 1758)
- Kirchenpaueria triangulata (Totton, 1930)
- Kirchenpaueria ventruosa (Billard, 1911)
