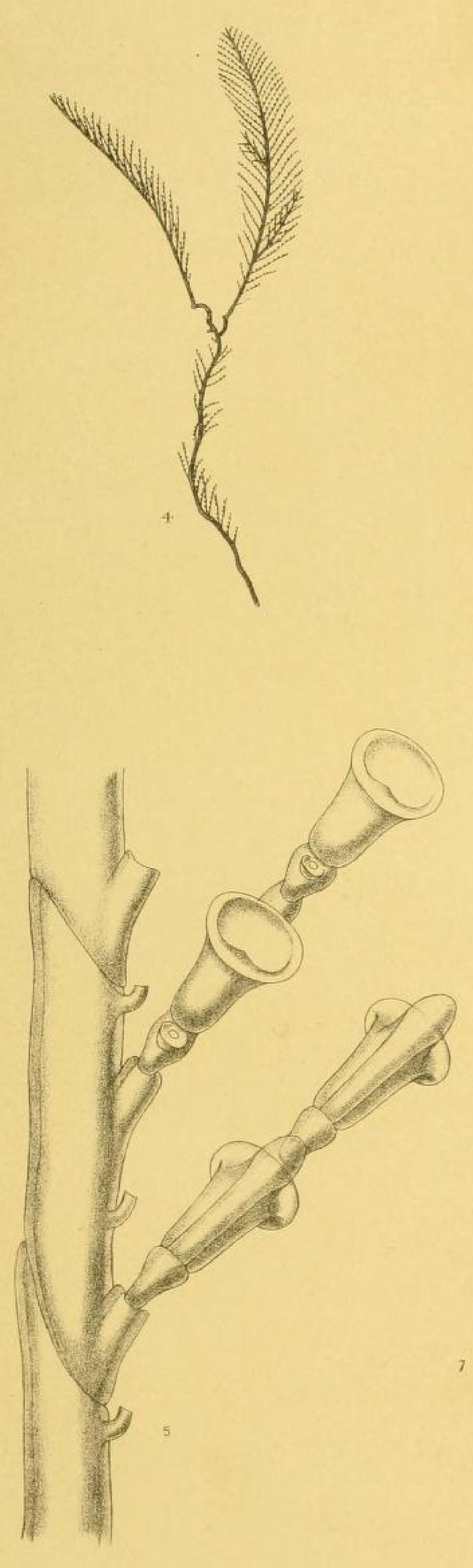
- Illustration of P. mirabilis

Scientific classification
- Kingdom: Animalia
- Phylum: Cnidaria
- Class: Hydrozoa
- Order: Leptothecata
- Family: Kirchenpaueriidae
- Genus: Pycnotheca; Stechow, 1919

Synonyms
- Diplocheilus Allman, 1883

= Pycnotheca =

Genus of hydrozoans

Pycnotheca is a genus of hydroids in the family Kirchenpaueriidae.

== Species ==
Three species are classified in this genus:

- Pycnotheca biseptata (Blackburn, 1938)
- Pycnotheca mirabilis (Allman, 1883)
- Pycnotheca producta (Bale, 1881)
