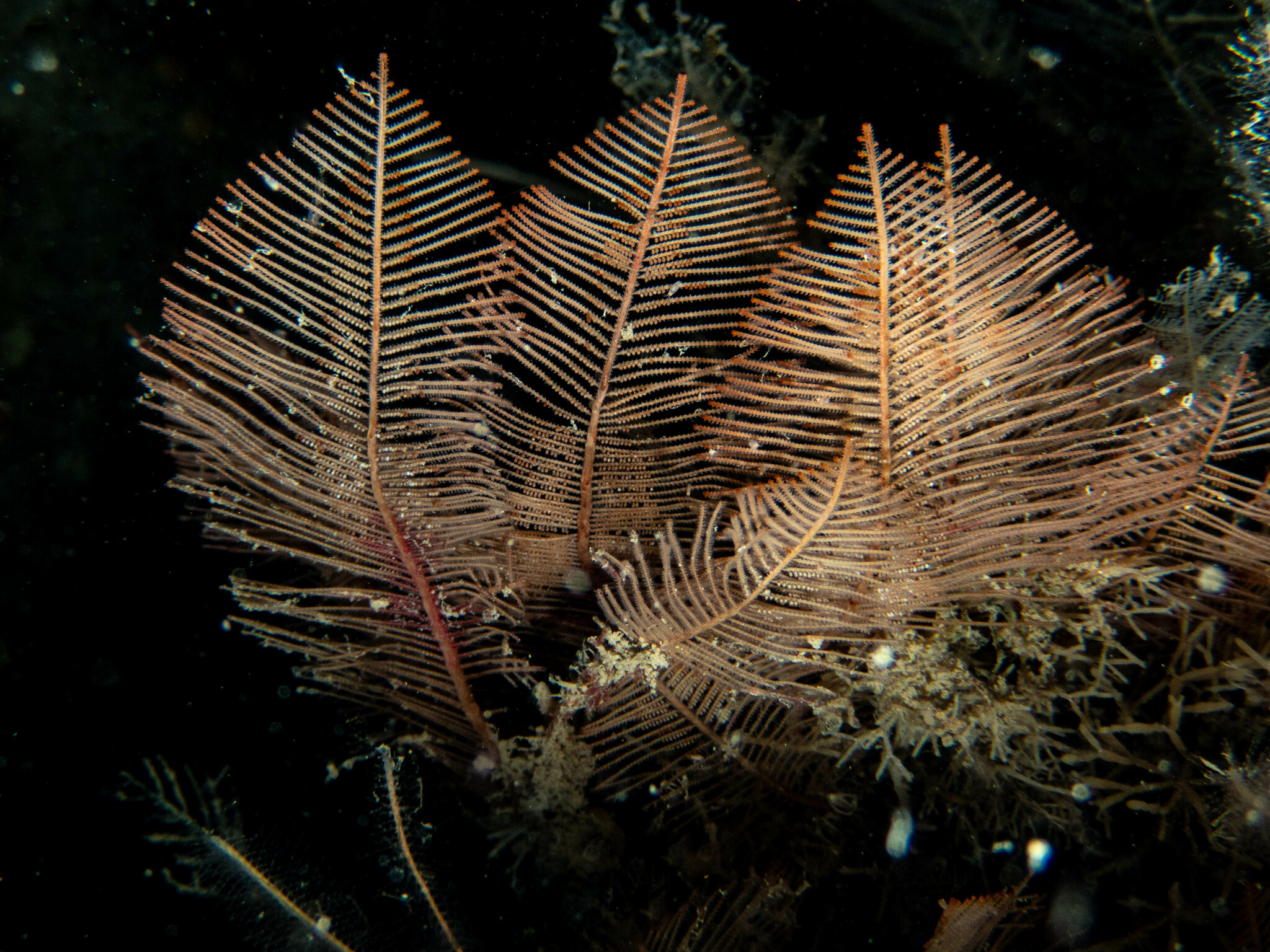
- Diphasia alata

Scientific classification
- Domain: Eukaryota
- Kingdom: Animalia
- Phylum: Cnidaria
- Class: Hydrozoa
- Order: Leptothecata
- Family: Sertulariidae
- Genus: Diphasia; Agassiz, 1862

Synonyms
- Diphasiella Stechow, 1921; Diphasis Agassiz, 1862; Nigellastrum Oken, 1815

= Diphasia =

Genus of hydrozoans

Diphasia is a genus of hydrozoans belonging to the family Sertulariidae.

The genus has a cosmopolitan distribution.

== Species ==
The following species are recognised in the genus Diphasia:

- Diphasia africana Gil & Ramil, 2017
- Diphasia alata (Hincks, 1855)
- Diphasia alternata Galea, 2019
- Diphasia anaramosae Gil & Ramil, 2017
- Diphasia attenuata (Hincks, 1866)
- Diphasia cauloatheca Billard, 1920
- Diphasia corniculata (Murray, 1860)
- Diphasia cristata Billard, 1920
- Diphasia delagei Billard, 1912
- Diphasia densa (Stechow, 1923)
- Diphasia digitalis (Busk, 1852)
- Diphasia dubia Hargitt, 1927
- Diphasia fallax (Johnston, 1847)
- Diphasia heurteli Billard, 1924
- Diphasia inornata Nutting, 1927
- Diphasia leonisae Gil & Ramil, 2017
- Diphasia margareta (Hassall, 1841)
- Diphasia minuta Billard, 1920
- Diphasia mutulata (Busk, 1852)
- Diphasia nigra (Pallas, 1766)
- Diphasia nuttingi Stechow, 1913
- Diphasia orientalis Billard, 1920
- Diphasia paarmani Nutting, 1904
- Diphasia palmata Nutting, 1905
- Diphasia robusta Fraser, 1941
- Diphasia rosacea (Linnaeus, 1758)
- Diphasia saharica Gil & Ramil, 2017
- Diphasia scalariformis Kirkpatrick, 1890
- Diphasia subcarinata (Busk, 1852)
- Diphasia tetraglochina Billard, 1907
- Diphasia thornelyi Ritchie, 1909
- Diphasia tropica Nutting, 1904
- Diphasia varians Jarvis, 1922
