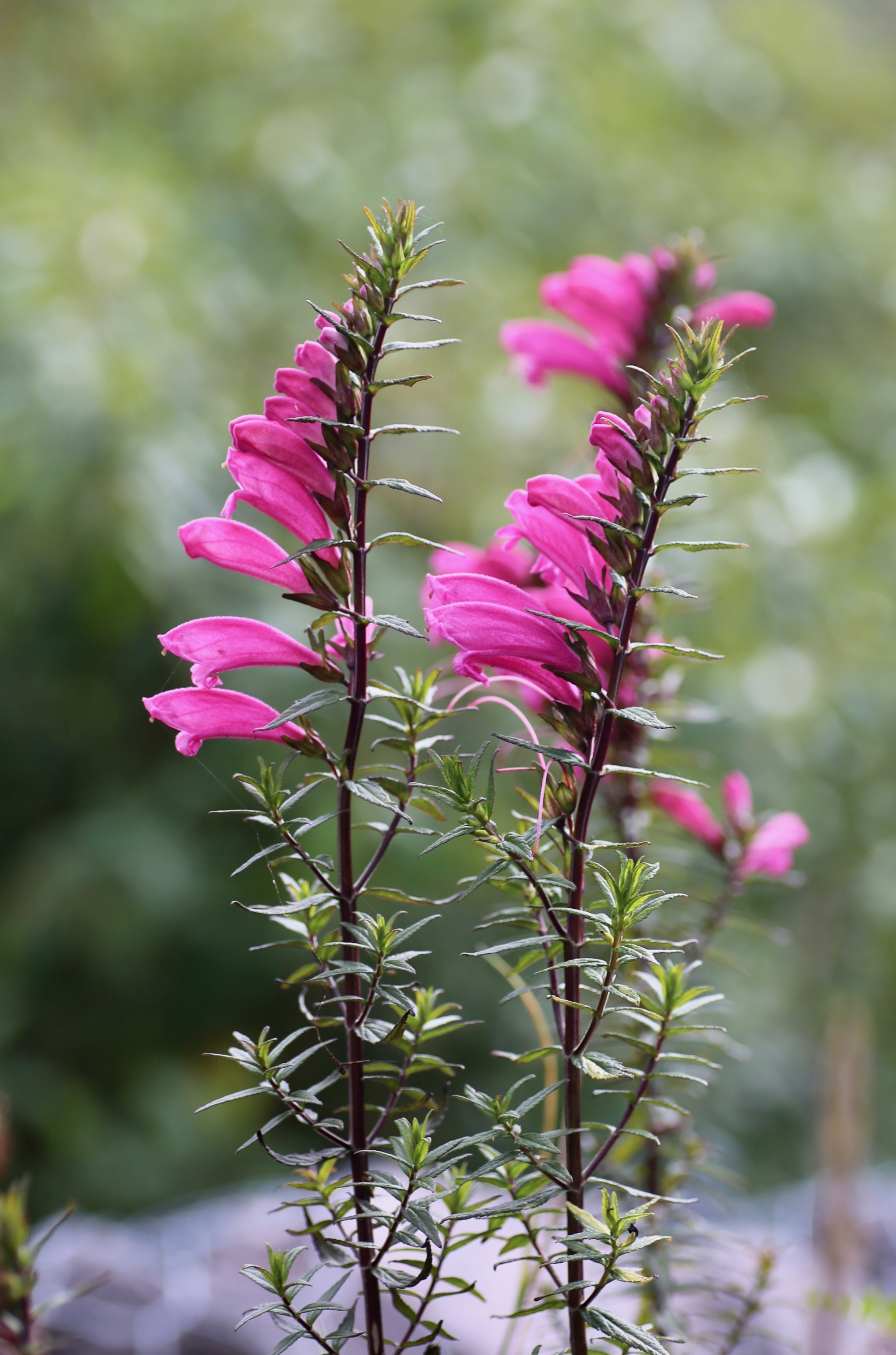
- Lamourouxia virgata, Ecuador, Napo Province,

Scientific classification
- Kingdom: Plantae
- Clade: Tracheophytes
- Clade: Angiosperms
- Clade: Eudicots
- Clade: Asterids
- Order: Lamiales
- Family: Orobanchaceae
- Genus: Lamourouxia; Kunth

= Lamourouxia (plant) =

Genus of flowering plants

Lamourouxia is a genus of flowering plants belonging to the family Orobanchaceae.

Its native range is Mexico to Peru. It is found in the countries of Belize, Colombia, Costa Rica, Ecuador, El Salvador, Guatemala, Honduras, Mexico, Nicaragua, Panamá and Peru. Kew also adds Magadan in Russia, this could be a random mistake.

The genus name of Lamourouxia is in honour of Jean Vincent Félix Lamouroux (1779–1825), a French biologist and naturalist, noted for his seminal work with algae. It was first described and published in F.W.H.von Humboldt, A.J.A.Bonpland & C.S.Kunth, Nov. Gen. Sp. Vol.2on page 335 in 1818.

== Known species ==
According to Kew:

- Lamourouxia barbata (Bertol.) MacVean, Cristof., T.F.Daniel & Baldini
- Lamourouxia brachyantha Greenm.
- Lamourouxia colimae W.R.Ernst & Baad
- Lamourouxia dasyantha (Cham. & Schltdl.) W.R.Ernst
- Lamourouxia dependens Benth.
- Lamourouxia dispar W.R.Ernst
- Lamourouxia gracilis B.L.Rob. & Greenm.
- Lamourouxia gutierrezii Oerst.
- Lamourouxia jaliscana W.R.Ernst & Baad
- Lamourouxia lanceolata Benth.
- Lamourouxia longiflora Benth.
- Lamourouxia macrantha M.Martens & Galeotti
- Lamourouxia microphylla M.Martens & Galeotti
- Lamourouxia multifida Kunth
- Lamourouxia nelsonii B.L.Rob. & Greenm.
- Lamourouxia ovata M.Martens & Galeotti
- Lamourouxia paneroi B.L.Turner
- Lamourouxia parayana W.R.Ernst
- Lamourouxia pringlei B.L.Rob. & Greenm.
- Lamourouxia rhinanthifolia Kunth
- Lamourouxia smithii B.L.Rob. & Greenm.
- Lamourouxia sylvatica Kunth
- Lamourouxia tenuifolia M.Martens & Galeotti
- Lamourouxia virgata Kunth
- Lamourouxia viscosa Kunth
- Lamourouxia xalapensis Kunth
- Lamourouxia zimapana B.L.Turner
