= Dictyocladium =

Scientific classification
- Domain: Eukaryota
- Kingdom: Animalia
- Phylum: Cnidaria
- Class: Hydrozoa
- Order: Leptothecata
- Family: Sertulariidae
- Genus: Dictyocladium; Allman, 1888

Genus of hydrozoans

Dictyocladium is a genus of hydrozoans belonging to the family Sertulariidae.

The species of this genus are found in Northern America, Southern Africa, Pacific Ocean.

Species:

- Dictyocladium amplexum Vervoort & Watson, 2003
- Dictyocladium biseriale Vervoort, 1993
- Dictyocladium coactum Stechow, 1923
- Dictyocladium flabellum Nutting, 1904
- Dictyocladium fuscum Hickson & Gravely, 1907
- Dictyocladium monilifer (Hutton, 1873)
- Dictyocladium reticulatum (Kirchenpauer, 1884)
- Dictyocladium thuja Vervoort & Watson, 2003
- Dictyocladium watsonae (Vervoort, 1993)
