= Halicornopsis =

Scientific classification
- Domain: Eukaryota
- Kingdom: Animalia
- Phylum: Cnidaria
- Class: Hydrozoa
- Order: Leptothecata
- Family: Kirchenpaueriidae
- Genus: Halicornopsis; Bale, 1882

Genus of hydrozoans

Halicornopsis is a genus of cnidarians belonging to the family Kirchenpaueriidae.

The species of this genus are found in Africa and Australia.

Species:

- Halicornopsis elegans (Lamarck, 1816)
