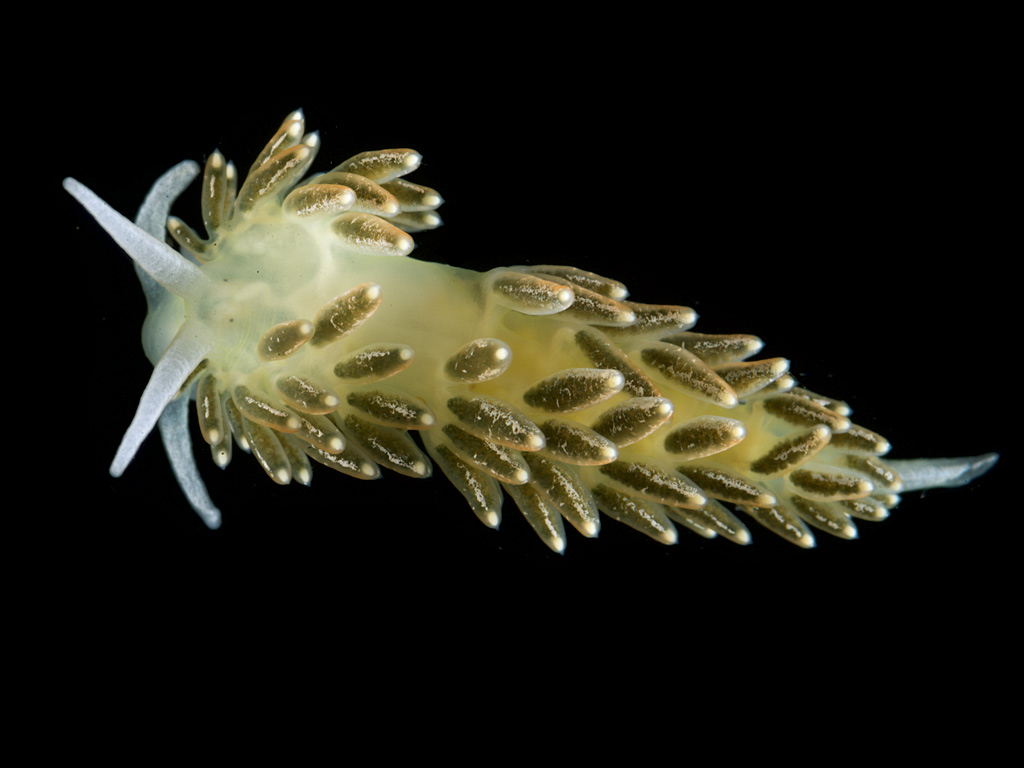
- The nudibranch Diaphoreolis viridis, Gulen Dive Resort, Norway.

Scientific classification
- Kingdom: Animalia
- Phylum: Mollusca
- Class: Gastropoda
- Order: Nudibranchia
- Suborder: Aeolidacea
- Family: Trinchesiidae
- Genus: Diaphoreolis; Iredale & O'Donoghue, 1923

= Diaphoreolis =

Genus of gastropods

Diaphoreolis is a genus of sea slugs, aeolid nudibranchs, marine gastropod molluscs in the family Trinchesiidae.

Diaphoreolis species feed on hydroids.

== Species ==
According to Korshunova et al. (2025), species in the genus Diaphoreolis include:

- Diaphoreolis flavovulta (MacFarland, 1966) - yellow-head aeolid
- Diaphoreolis lagunae (O'Donoghue, 1926) - orange-faced cuthona
- Diaphoreolis midori Martynov et al., 2015
- Diaphoreolis scintillans Miller, 1977
- Diaphoreolis stipata Alder & Hancock, 1843
- Diaphoreolis veronicae Verrill, 1880
- Diaphoreolis viridis (Forbes, 1840) - type species (as Eolis northumbrica Alder & Hancock, 1844)
- Diaphoreolis zvezda Korshunova et al., 2023
