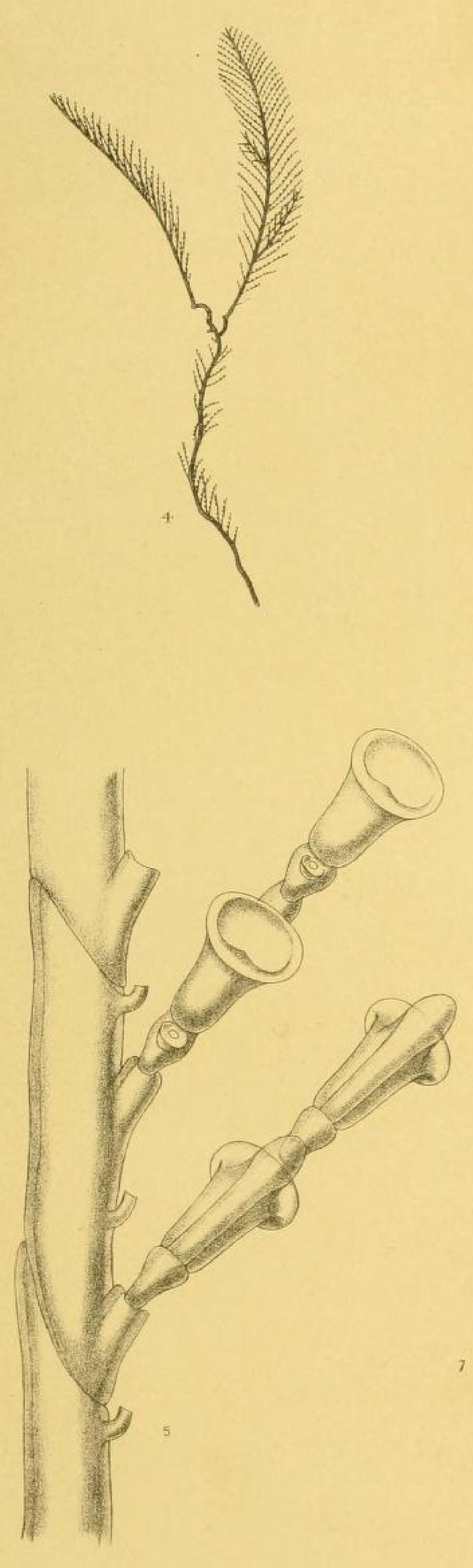
- Illustration from the protologue of P. mirabilis

Scientific classification
- Kingdom: Animalia
- Phylum: Cnidaria
- Class: Hydrozoa
- Order: Leptothecata
- Family: Kirchenpaueriidae
- Genus: Pycnotheca
- Species: P. mirabilis

Binomial name
- Pycnotheca mirabilis (Allman, 1883)

Synonyms
- Diplocheilus allmani Torrey, 1902; Pycnotheca allmani (Torrey, 1902)

= Pycnotheca mirabilis =

Species of cnidarian

Pycnotheca mirabilis, The feathery hydroid, is a colonial hydroid in the family Kirchenpaueriidae. Feathery hydroids are often white and grow in crowded colonies resembling upright feathers. The stems may grow to 3 cm in total height. The reproductive bodies are found at the base of the stems and resemble beehives.

This colonial animal is found off the South African coast from False Bay to KwaZulu-Natal, as well as around the Indo-Pacific rim and Vema Seamount. It lives from the subtidal to 50 m under water. This species eats microplankton.
