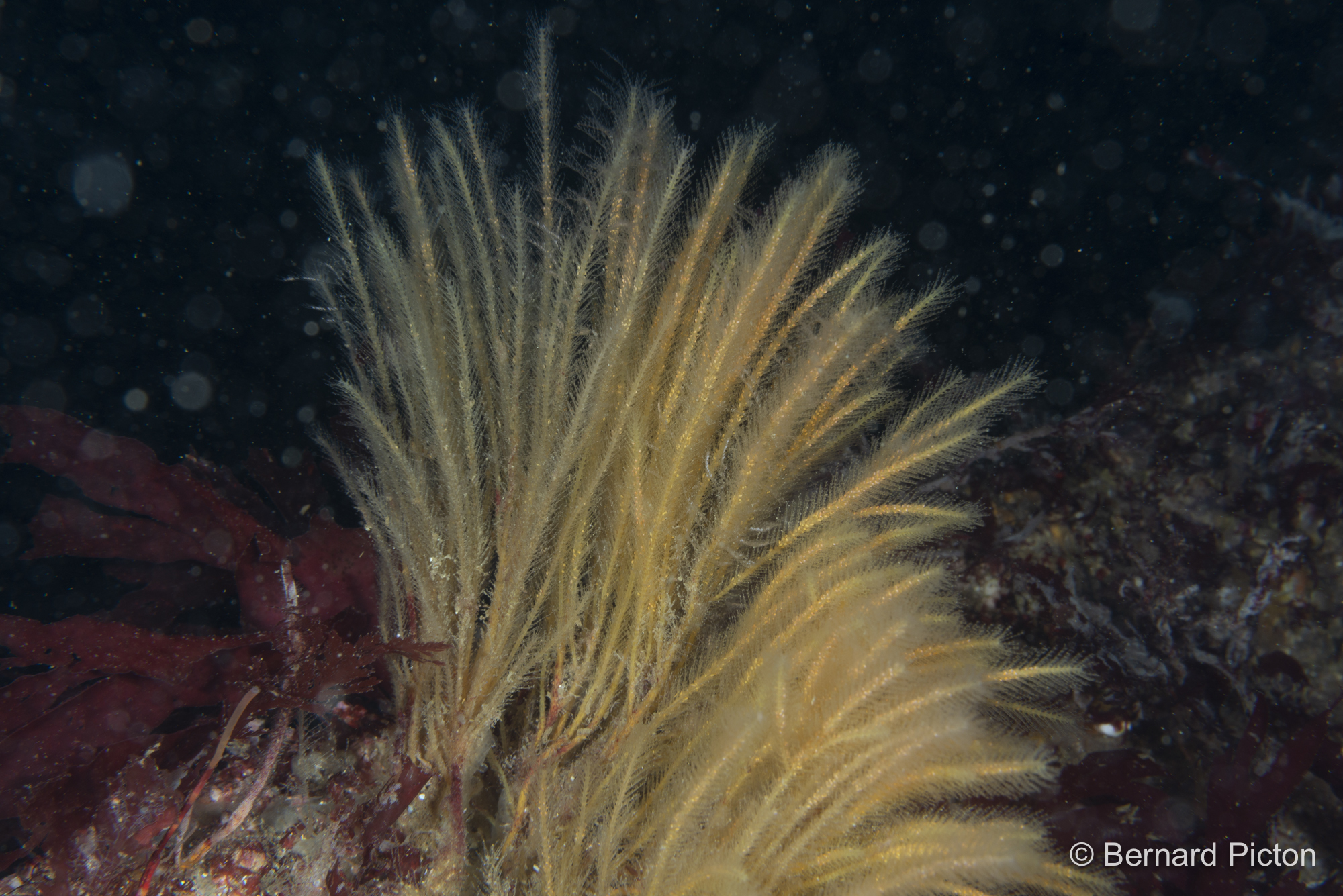
- Nemertesia ramosa

Scientific classification
- Domain: Eukaryota
- Kingdom: Animalia
- Phylum: Cnidaria
- Class: Hydrozoa
- Order: Leptothecata
- Family: Plumulariidae
- Genus: Nemertesia; Lamouroux, 1812

= Nemertesia =

Genus of hydrozoans

Nemertesia is a genus of cnidarians belonging to the family Plumulariidae.

The genus has cosmopolitan distribution.

Species:

- Nemertesia alternata (Fraser, 1938)
- Nemertesia americana (Nutting, 1900)
- Nemertesia anonyma Ansin Agis, Ramil & Vervoort, 2001
- Nemertesia antennina (Linnaeus, 1758)
- Nemertesia belini Bedot, 1916
- Nemertesia caboverdensis Gil, Ramil & Ansin-Agis, 2020
- Nemertesia californica Ramil & Vervoort, 2006
- Nemertesia ciliata Bale, 1914
- Nemertesia compacta (Fraser, 1938)
- Nemertesia constricta (Fraser, 1948)
- Nemertesia cymodocea (Busk, 1851)
- Nemertesia dissimilis (Fraser, 1943)
- Nemertesia distans (Nutting, 1900)
- Nemertesia elongata Totton, 1930
- Nemertesia falcicula Ramil & Vervoort, 1992
- Nemertesia fraseri Ramil & Vervoort, 1992
- Nemertesia freiwaldi Gil, Ramil & Ansin-Agis, 2020
- Nemertesia geniculata (Nutting, 1900)
- Nemertesia gracilis (Fraser, 1948)
- Nemertesia hancocki Calder, Vervoort & Hochberg, 2009
- Nemertesia hexasticha Kirchenpauer, 1876
- Nemertesia hippuris (Allman, 1877)
- Nemertesia inconstans (Fraser, 1948)
- Nemertesia indivisa (Allman, 1883)
- Nemertesia intermedia Kirchenpauer, 1876
- Nemertesia inverta (Fraser, 1948)
- Nemertesia japonica (Stechow, 1907)
- Nemertesia longicorna (Nutting, 1900)
- Nemertesia mexicana Ramil & Vervoort, 2007
- Nemertesia multiramosa (Fraser, 1948)
- Nemertesia mutabilis (Fraser, 1948)
- Nemertesia nigra (Nutting, 1900)
- Nemertesia norvegica (Sars, 1873)
- Nemertesia pacifica (Nutting, 1927)
- Nemertesia paradoxa Kirchenpauer, 1876
- Nemertesia parva (Fraser, 1948)
- Nemertesia perrieri (Billard, 1901)
- Nemertesia pinnatifida Vervoort & Watson, 2003
- Nemertesia polynema (Fraser, 1948)
- Nemertesia ramosa (Lamarck, 1816)
- Nemertesia rugosa (Nutting, 1900)
- Nemertesia septata (Fraser, 1938)
- Nemertesia simplex (Allman, 1877)
- Nemertesia singularis (Vervoort, 1941)
- Nemertesia sinuosa (Fraser, 1947)
- Nemertesia tetraseriata (Fraser, 1938)
- Nemertesia tetrasticha (Meneghini, 1845)
- Nemertesia triseriata (de Pourtalès, 1867)
- Nemertesia tropica Ramil & Vervoort, 2007
- Nemertesia ventriculiformis (Marktanner-Turneretscher, 1890)
- Nemertesia verticillata (Fraser, 1925)
- Nemertesia vervoorti El Beshbeeshy, 2011
