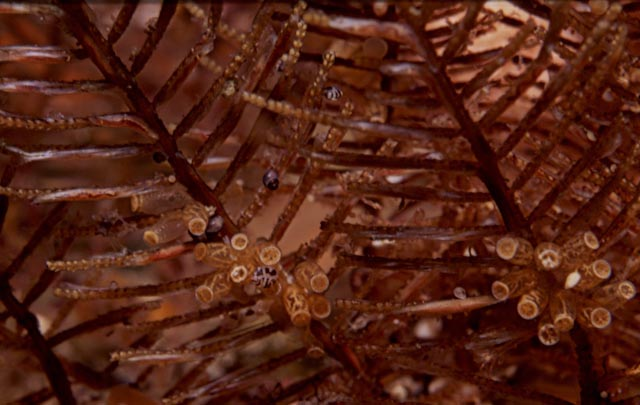
- Thuiaria articulata

Scientific classification
- Kingdom: Animalia
- Phylum: Cnidaria
- Class: Hydrozoa
- Order: Leptothecata
- Family: Sertulariidae
- Genus: Thuiaria; Fleming, 1828

Species
- See text

Synonyms
- Biseriaria Blainville, 1830; Dymella Stechow, 1923; Pericladium Allman, 1876

= Thuiaria =

Genus of hydrozoans

Thuiaria is a genus of hydroids in the family Sertulariidae.

== Species ==
The following species are classed in this genus:

- Thuiaria abyssicola (Billard, 1925)
- Thuiaria acutiloba Kirchenpauer, 1884
- Thuiaria allmani (Norman, 1878)
- Thuiaria alternans Naumov, 1952
- Thuiaria alternitheca Levinsen, 1893
- Thuiaria arctica (Bonnevie, 1899)
- Thuiaria articulata (Pallas, 1766)
- Thuiaria bidentata (Allman, 1876)
- Thuiaria breitfussi (Kudelin, 1914)
- Thuiaria carica Levinsen, 1893
- Thuiaria cedrina (Linnaeus, 1758)
- Thuiaria constans (Fraser, 1948)
- Thuiaria cornigera Kudelin, 1914
- Thuiaria coronifera Allman, 1876
- Thuiaria cupressoides (Lepechin, 1783)
- Thuiaria cylindrica Clark, 1876
- Thuiaria deberki Kudelin, 1914
- Thuiaria decemserialis (Merezhkovskii, 1878)
- Thuiaria diffusa (Allman, 1885)
- Thuiaria excepticea Fenyuk, 1947
- Thuiaria gonorhiza Naumov, 1952
- Thuiaria hartlaubi (Nutting, 1904)
- Thuiaria hippuris Allman, 1874
- Thuiaria insociabilis Fraser, 1948
- Thuiaria invicea Naumov, 1960
- Thuiaria involuta Naumov, 1960
- Thuiaria kudelini Naumov, 1960
- Thuiaria kurilae Nutting, 1904
- Thuiaria laxa Allman, 1874
- Thuiaria lebedi Naumov, 1960
- Thuiaria mereschkowskii Kudelin, 1914
- Thuiaria nivea Fenyuk, 1947
- Thuiaria obsoleta (Lepechin, 1781)
- Thuiaria ochotensis (Mereschkowsky, 1878)
- Thuiaria operculata Watson, 2000
- Thuiaria pinaster (Lepechin, 1783)
- Thuiaria pinna Naumov, 1960
- Thuiaria plumiformis (Nutting, 1904)
- Thuiaria plumularioides Watson, 2000
- Thuiaria purpurea (Linnaeus, 1758)
- Thuiaria sachalini Kudelin, 1914
- Thuiaria stelleri Kirchenpauer, 1884
- Thuiaria subthuja (Fenyuk, 1947)
- Thuiaria tetrastriata Naumov, 1960
- Thuiaria thuja (Linnaeus, 1758)
- Thuiaria trilateralis (Fraser, 1936)
- Thuiaria triserialis (Merezhkovskii, 1878)
- Thuiaria uschakovi Naumov, 1960
- Thuiaria wulfiusi Naumov, 1960
- Thuiaria zachsi Fenyuk, 1947
