= Amphisbetia =

Scientific classification
- Kingdom: Animalia
- Phylum: Cnidaria
- Class: Hydrozoa
- Order: Leptothecata
- Superfamily: Sertularioidea
- Family: Sertulariidae
- Genus: Amphisbetia; L. Agassiz, 1862

Species
- See text

Genus of hydrozoa

Amphisbetia is a genus of hydrozoa in the family Sertulariidae described by L. Agassiz in 1862 based on the type species Amphisbetia operculata (Linnaeus, 1758), which was originally designated as Sertularia operculata by Carl Linnaeus in 1758. The type species Amphisbetia operculata is also called sea-hair.

== Species ==
As of August 2023 there are 31 accepted species in the genus.

- Amphisbetia avia Watson, 1975
- Amphisbetia bicuspidata (Lamarck, 1816)
- Amphisbetia bidens (Bale, 1884)
- Amphisbetia bispinosa (Gray, 1843)
- Amphisbetia operculata (Linnaeus, 1758) (type)
