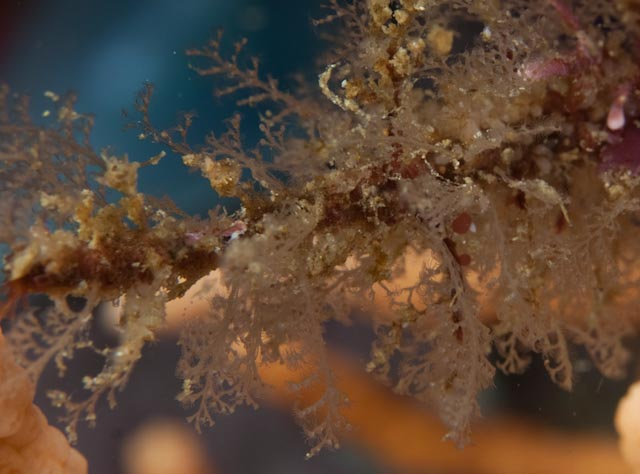

Scientific classification
- Kingdom: Animalia
- Phylum: Cnidaria
- Class: Hydrozoa
- Order: Leptothecata
- Family: Plumulariidae
- Genus: Plumularia
- Species: P. setacea

Binomial name
- Plumularia setacea (Linnaeus, 1758)

Synonyms
- Plumularia corrugata Nutting, 1900; Plumularia diploptera Totton, 1930; Polyplumularia setacea (Linnaeus, 1758); Sertularia setacea Linnaeus, 1758

= Plumularia setacea =

Species of cnidarian

Plumularia setacea, the plumed hydroid or little sea bristle, is a colonial hydrozoan in the family Plumulariidae and is found worldwide. It lives from the shore to 430m under water.

== Description ==
Plumed hydroids are creamy yellow to brown and have feathery stems. The stems may grow to 2 cm in total height. The reproductive bodies are smooth and oval.

== Ecology ==
This species eats microplankton.
