= Gigantotheca =

Scientific classification
- Domain: Eukaryota
- Kingdom: Animalia
- Phylum: Cnidaria
- Class: Hydrozoa
- Order: Leptothecata
- Family: Sertulariidae
- Genus: Gigantotheca; Vervoort & Watson, 2003

Genus of hydrozoans

Gigantotheca is a genus of hydrozoans belonging to the family Sertulariidae.

The species of this genus are found in the coasts of New Zealand.

Species:

- Gigantotheca maxima Vervoort & Watson, 2003
- Gigantotheca raukumarai Vervoort & Watson, 2003
