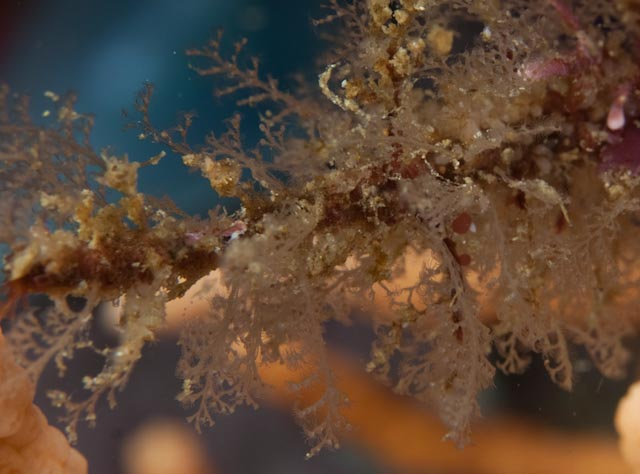
- Plumularia setacea

Scientific classification
- Kingdom: Animalia
- Phylum: Cnidaria
- Class: Hydrozoa
- Order: Leptothecata
- Family: Plumulariidae
- Genus: Plumularia; Lamarck, 1816

Species
- See text

Synonyms
- Monotheca Nutting, 1900; Monothecella Stechow, 1923

= Plumularia =

Genus of hydrozoans

Plumularia is a genus of hydrozoans in the family Plumulariidae.

== Species ==
The following species are classified in this genus:

- Plumularia acutifrons Fraser, 1938
- Plumularia adjecta Fraser, 1948
- Plumularia amphibola (Watson, 2011)
- Plumularia annuligera Quelch, 1885
- Plumularia anonyma Vervoort & Watson, 2003
- Plumularia antonbruuni Millard, 1967
- Plumularia attenuata Allman, 1877
- Plumularia australiensis Watson, 1973
- Plumularia australis Kirchenpauer, 1876
- Plumularia badia Kirchenpauer, 1876
- Plumularia bathyalis Ansín Agís, Vervoort & Ramil, 2014
- Plumularia biarmata Fraser, 1938
- Plumularia billardi Ansín Agís, Ramil & Calder, 2016
- Plumularia caliculata Bale, 1888
- Plumularia camarata Nutting, 1927
- Plumularia campanuloides Billiard, 1911
- Plumularia canariensis Izquierdo, García-Corrales & Bacallado, 1986
- Plumularia caulitheca Fewkes, 1881
- Plumularia congregata Vervoort & Watson, 2003
- Plumularia conjuncta Billiard, 1913
- Plumularia contraria Ansín Agís, Vervoort & Ramil, 2014
- Plumularia corrugatissima Mulder & Trebilcock, 1915
- Plumularia crater Billiard, 1911
- Plumularia crateriformis Mulder & Trebilcock, 1911
- Plumularia crateroides Mulder & Trebilcock, 1911
- Plumularia defecta Fraser, 1938
- Plumularia delicata Nutting, 1906
- Plumularia dolichotheca Allman, 1883
- Plumularia duseni Jäderholm, 1904
- Plumularia elongata Billiard, 1913
- Plumularia epibracteolosa Watson, 1973
- Plumularia excavata Mulder & Trebilcock, 1911
- Plumularia exilis Fraser, 1948
- Plumularia filicaulis Kirchenpauer, 1876
- Plumularia filicula Allman, 1877
- Plumularia flabellata Nutting, 1927
- Plumularia flabellum Allman, 1883
- Plumularia flexuosa Bale, 1894
- Plumularia floridana Nutting, 1900
- Plumularia gaimardi (Lamouroux, 1824)
- Plumularia goldsteini Bale, 1882
- Plumularia habereri Stechow, 1909
- Plumularia hargitti Nutting, 1927
- Plumularia hyalina (Bale, 1882)
- Plumularia insignis Allman, 1883
- Plumularia insolens Fraser, 1948
- Plumularia integra Fraser, 1948
- Plumularia jordani Nutting, 1906
- Plumularia kirkpatricki Billiard, 1908
- Plumularia lagenifera Allman, 1885
- Plumularia leloupi Blanco & Bellusci, 1971
- Plumularia macrotheca Allman, 1877
- Plumularia margaretta (Nutting, 1900)
- Plumularia megalocephala Allman, 1877
- Plumularia meganema Fraser, 1948
- Plumularia meretriacia Watson, 1973
- Plumularia michaelseni Stechow, 1924
- Plumularia micronema Fraser, 1938
- Plumularia milsteinae Ansín Agís, Vervoort & Ramil, 2014
- Plumularia mooreana Schuchert, 2013
- Plumularia mossambicae Millard, 1975
- Plumularia mula Totton, 1936
- Plumularia obliqua (Johnston, 1847)
- Plumularia opima Bale, 1924
- Plumularia orientalis Billiard, 1911
- Plumularia paucinema Fraser, 1940
- Plumularia paucinoda Nutting, 1900
- Plumularia polycladia Mammen, 1967
- Plumularia posidoniae (Picard, 1952)
- Plumularia procumbens Spencer, 1891
- Plumularia propinqua Fraser, 1938
- Plumularia pseudocontraria Ansín Agís, Vervoort & Ramil, 2014
- Plumularia pulchella Bale, 1882
- Plumularia rotunda Mulder & Trebilcock, 1911
- Plumularia setacea (Linnaeus, 1758)
- Plumularia setaceiformis Mulder & Trebilcock, 1915
- Plumularia setaceoides Bale, 1882
- Plumularia siliculata (Mammen, 1967)
- Plumularia spinulosa Bale, 1882
- Plumularia spiralis Billiard, 1911
- Plumularia spirocladia Totton, 1930
- Plumularia strictocarpa Pictet, 1893
- Plumularia strobilophora Billiard, 1913
- Plumularia stylifera Allman, 1883
- Plumularia sulcata Lamarck, 1816
- Plumularia syriaca Billiard, 1931
- Plumularia tenuissima Totton, 1930
- Plumularia togata Watson, 1973
- Plumularia tubacarpa Watson, 2000
- Plumularia undulata Yamada, 1950
- Plumularia variabilis Quelch, 1885
- Plumularia vervoorti Leloup, 1971
- Plumularia virginiae Nutting, 1900
- Plumularia warreni Stechow, 1919
- Plumularia wasini Jarvis, 1922
- Plumularia wattsi Bale, 1887
