= Jean Vincent Félix Lamouroux =

French biologist and naturalist

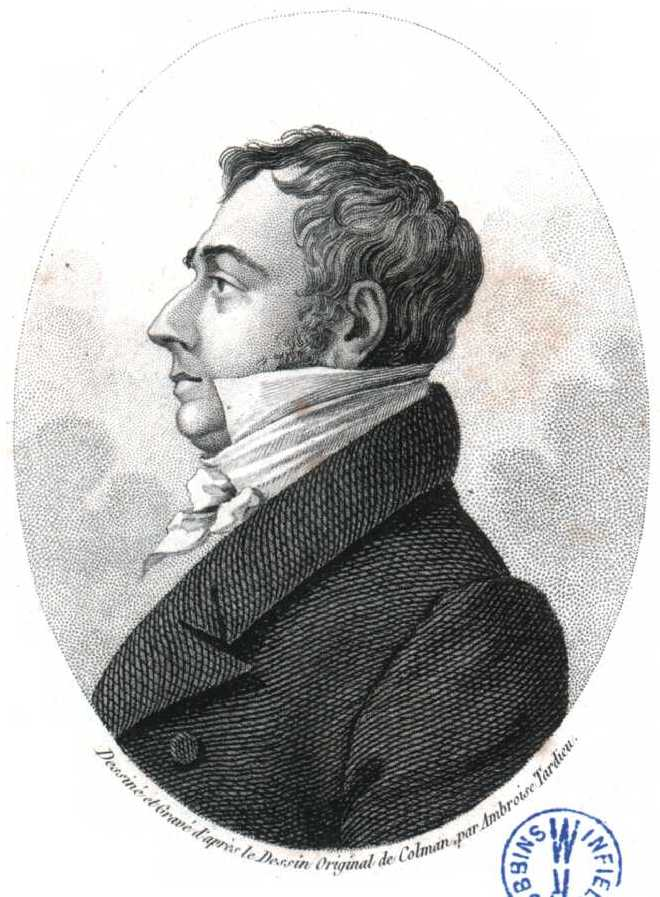
- Jean Vincent Félix Lamouroux
- Born: May 3, 1779; Agen
- Died: March 26, 1825 (aged 45); Caen
- Education: Saint-Amans school
- Known for: Seminal work with algae
- Scientific career
- Fields: Biology
- Thesis: (1805)
- Notable students: Arcisse de Caumont
- Author abbrev. (botany): J.V.Lamour.

Jean Vincent Félix Lamouroux (3 May 1779 – 26 March 1825) was a French biologist and naturalist, noted for his seminal work with algae.

== Biography ==
Lamouroux was born in Agen in the Aquitaine of southwestern France, the son of Claude Lamouroux, an intellectual who made his livelihood in manufacturing, but who was also a musician, a one-term mayor of Agen, and a co-founder of the Academic Society of Agen. Jean Vincent Lamouroux studied botany at the Boudon de Saint-Amans school in Agen.

Lamouroux was particularly interested in marine organisms such as algae and hydrozoans. In 1805 he published a dissertation on several species of Fucus before settling in Paris in 1807, after his father went into bankruptcy.

In 1807, Lamouroux was appointed to the French Academy of Sciences and in 1808 he became an assistant professor of natural history at the University of Caen, rising to full professorship by 1811. He joined the Linnean Society of Calvados and contributed to its publications, collaborating with his friend Jean Baptiste Bory de Saint-Vincent. About this time he became director of the Caen Botanical Gardens. He contributed articles to the journal Annales générales des sciences physiques ("General Annals of the Physical Sciences") and to the Dictionnaire classique d'histoire naturelle (Classic Dictionary of Natural History).

Lamouroux was the first to make the distinction between green algae, brown algae and red algae. In 1813, Dawson Turner adopted Lamouroux's classification system for algae, providing it with international credence.

Lamouroux was also interested in other classification systems in marine biology. On which he published two notable works:

- Histoire des Polypiers coralligènes flexibles, vulgairement nommés Zoophytes (Origin of the flexible coralline polypbearers, popularly named zoophytes) (1816) Caen
- Exposition méthodique des genres de l'ordre des polypiers (Systematic description of the genera of the order of polypbearers) (1821) Paris.

In 1821 he published a "Résumé d’un cours élémentaire de géographie physique" ("Summary of a basic course of physical geography") exploring the foundations of atmospheric science, hydrography, astronomy, and geology. Lamouroux's interest in fossils was quite broad. He collected reptilian fossils in the Jurassic of Normandy and communicated some of them to Georges Cuvier.

In 1825, Lamouroux died in Caen. He was most influential on his student Arcisse de Caumont, who succeeded him in his chair at the University of Caen.

== Species ==
Among the species that Lamouroux identified and described are:

- Aglaophenia cupressina (Lamouroux, 1816)
- Bryopsis pennata (Lamouroux, 1809)
- Campanularia clytioides (Lamouroux, 1824)
- Dynamena crisioides (Lamouroux, 1824)
- Dynamena obliqua (Lamouroux, 1816)
- Gelidium amansii (Lamouroux, 1813)
- Gymnangium arcuatum (Lamouroux, 1816)
- Halopteris glutinosa (Lamouroux, 1816)
- Idiellana pristis (Lamouroux, 1816)
- Lytocarpia crucialis (Lamouroux, 1816)
- Lytocarpia flexuosus (Lamouroux, 1816)
- Parascyphus simplex (Lamouroux, 1816)
- Salacia tetracythara (Lamouroux, 1816)
- Sertularella arbuscula (Lamouroux, 1816)
- Sertularella gaudichaudi (Lamouroux, 1824)
- Sertularella gayi (Lamouroux, 1821)
- Sertularella pinnata (Lamouroux, 1816)
- Sertularella tridentata (Lamouroux, 1816)
- Sertularia distans (Lamouroux, 1816)
- Sertularia divergens (Lamouroux, 1816)
- Sertularia turbinata (Lamouroux, 1816)
- Stereotheca elongata (Lamouroux, 1816)
- Symplectoscyphus unilateralis (Lamouroux, 1924)
- Thyroscyphus macrocyttarus (Lamouroux, 1824)

He also described genera such as Desmarestia.

In 1818, botanist Carl Sigismund Kunth described a genus of plants from Mexico and Central America, (in the family Orobanchaceae), as Lamourouxia in his honour.

== Sources ==
- Brignon, Arnaud (2014) "The first discoveries of fossil crocodilians in the “Pierre de Caen” (Bathonian, Normandy, France) through the archives of Georges Cuvier", Revue de Paléobiologie, 33(2):379-418
- Ferrière, Hervé (2009) "Bory de Saint-Vincent: l'évolution d'un voyageur naturaliste" (Bory de Saint-Vincent: the evolution of a traveling naturalist) Syllepse, Paris, France, ISBN 978-2-84950-243-3
- Lauzun, Philippe (1893) "Une famille agenaise: Les Lamouroux" de Vve Lamy, Agen, France, OCLC 123524904
