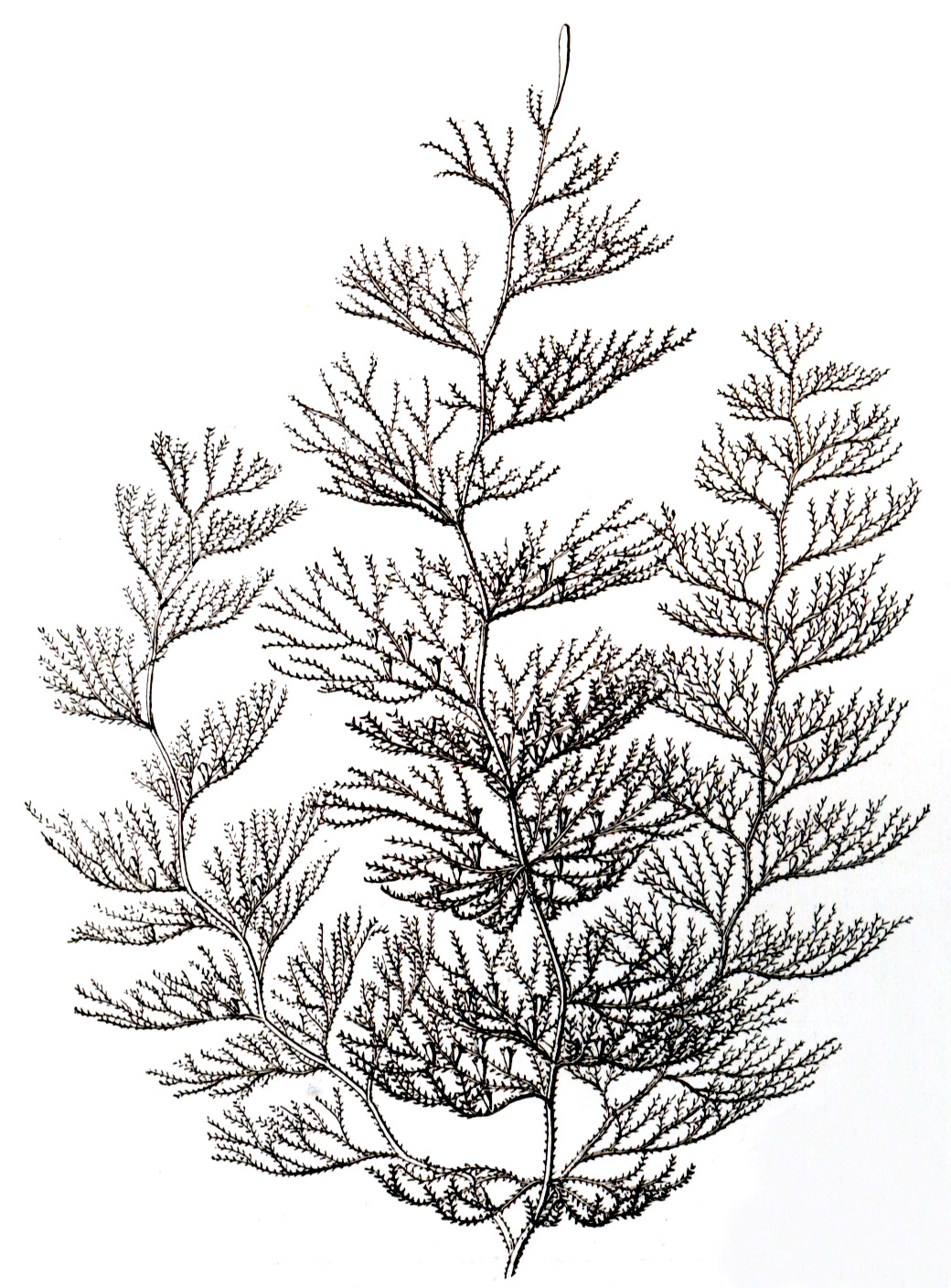
- Colony of Sertularia argentea

Scientific classification
- Kingdom: Animalia
- Phylum: Cnidaria
- Class: Hydrozoa
- Order: Leptothecata
- Family: Sertulariidae
- Genus: Sertularia; Linnaeus, 1758

Species
- See text

Synonyms
- Tridentata Stechow, 1920

= Sertularia =

Genus of hydrozoans

Sertularia is a genus of hydroids in the family Sertulariidae.

== Species ==
The following species are recognized in the genus Sertularia:

- Sertularia albimaris Mereschkowsky, 1877
- Air Fern (Sertularia argentea Linnaeus, 1758)
- Sertularia australis (Kirchenpauer, 1864)
- Sertularia borneensis Billiard, 1925
- Sertularia brashnikowi Kudelin, 1914
- Sertularia brunnea (Stechow, 1923)
- Sertularia camtschatika Vinogradov, 1947
- Sertularia ceylonensis Stechow, 1921
- Sertularia conferta (Kirchenpauer, 1864)
- Sertularia converrucosa Naumov, 1960
- Sertularia cupressina Linnaeus, 1758
- Sertularia cupressoides Clark, 1876
- Sertularia distans (Lamouroux, 1816)
- Sertularia dohrni Stechow, 1923
- Sertularia ephemera Galea, 2010
- Sertularia fabricii Levinsen, 1893
- Sertularia fissa (Thornely, 1904)
- Sertularia flexilis Thompson, 1879
- Sertularia flowersi Nutting, 1904
- Sertularia gracilis Hassall, 1848
- Sertularia gracillima Bale, 1926
- Sertularia hattorii Leloup, 1940
- Sertularia heteroclada (Jäderholm, 1902)
- Sertularia humilis (Armstrong, 1879)
- Sertularia intermedia Levinsen, 1913
- Sertularia latiuscula Stimpson, 1854
- Sertularia linkoi Kudelin, 1914
- Sertularia littoralis Thornely, 1900
- Sertularia loculosa Busk, 1852
- Sertularia maccallumi Bartlett, 1907
- Sertularia macrocarpa Bale, 1884
- Sertularia malayensis Billiard, 1925
- Sertularia marginata (Kirchenpauer, 1864)
- Sertularia mediterranea (Marktanner-Turneretscher, 1890)
- Sertularia mertoni Stechow & Müller, 1923
- Sertularia mirabilis (Verrill, 1873)
- Sertularia nasonovi Kudelin, 1913
- Sertularia notabilis Fraser, 1947
- Sertularia nuttingi Levinsen, 1913
- Sertularia orthogonalis Gibbons & Ryland, 1989
- Sertularia perpusilla Stechow, 1919
- Sertularia plumosa (Clark, 1876)
- Sertularia robusta (Clark, 1877)
- Sertularia rugosissima Thornely, 1904
- Sertularia schmidti Kudelin, 1914
- Sertularia similis Clark, 1877
- Sertularia simplex (Fraser, 1938)
- Sertularia snyderi Nutting, 1906
- Sertularia stabilis Fraser, 1948
- Sertularia staurotheca Naumov, 1960
- Sertularia suensoni Levinsen, 1913
- Sertularia tatarica Kudelin, 1913
- Sertularia tenera G. O. Sars, 1874
- Sertularia tenuis Bale, 1884
- Sertularia tolli (Jäderholm, 1908)
- Sertularia tongensis (Stechow, 1919)
- Sertularia trigonostoma Busk, 1852
- Sertularia tumida Allman, 1877
- Sertularia turbinata (Lamouroux, 1816)
- Sertularia unguiculata Busk, 1852
- Sertularia vervoorti Migotto & Calder, 1998
- Sertularia xuelongi Song, Gravili & Wang, 2016
