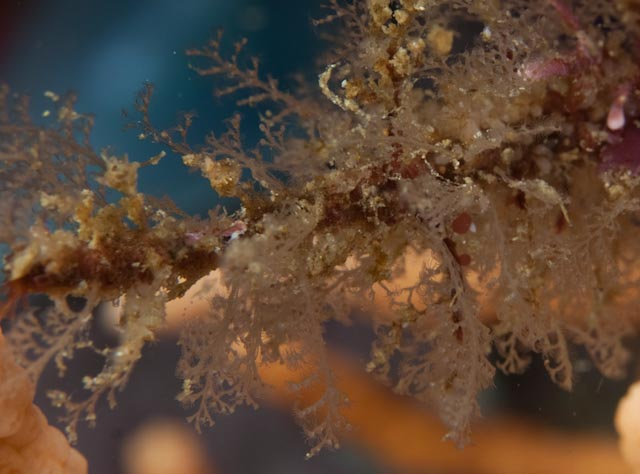
- Plumularia setacea

Scientific classification
- Kingdom: Animalia
- Phylum: Cnidaria
- Class: Hydrozoa
- Order: Leptothecata
- Superfamily: Plumularioidea
- Family: Plumulariidae; Agassiz, 1862

Genera
- See text

= Plumulariidae =

Family of hydrozoans

Plumulariidae is a family of hydrozoans.

== Genus ==
According to the World Register of Marine Species, the following genera belong to this family:

- Callicarpa Fewkes, 1881
- Cladacanthella Calder, 1997
- Dentitheca Stechow, 1919
- Hippurella Allman, 1877
- Nemertesia Lamouroux, 1812
- Plumularia Lamarck, 1816
- Pseudoplumaria Ramil & Vervoort, 1992
- Schizoplumularia Ansín Agís, Ramil & Calder, 2016
- Sibogella Billard, 1911

== Plumularidae of America (1900) ==
Charles Cleveland Nutting, an American zoologist, wrote the first survey of what he then called 'Plumularidæ' of America in 1900. Before him, Louis Agassiz had mentioned only three species in 1862. His son Alexander Agassiz recognized six species. In 1877 George Allman described twenty-six species. Nutting gives descriptions and figures of about one hundred and twenty-one species! He writes:

It is now evident that the West Indian region is the richest in plumularian life of any area of equal size in the world. Not even the Australian region, hitherto regarded as by far the most prolific in these exceedingly graceful organisms, can equal our own southern waters in profusion of genera and species.

— Nutting 1900, p. 1

== Sources ==
- Nutting, Charles Cleveland [at Wikisource] (1900). American hydroids. Special Bulletin of the United States National Museum, Smithsonian Institution. Vol. 1, The Plumularidae. Washington: Government Printing Office. OCLC 768968015.
