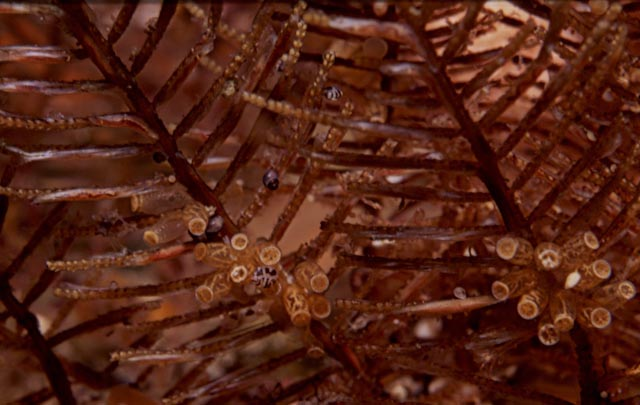
- Jointed hydroid with reproductive bodies

Scientific classification
- Kingdom: Animalia
- Phylum: Cnidaria
- Class: Hydrozoa
- Order: Leptothecata
- Family: Sertulariidae
- Genus: Thuiaria
- Species: T. articulata

Binomial name
- Thuiaria articulata (Pallas, 1766)

= Thuiaria articulata =

Species of colonial hydroid

Thuiaria articulata, the jointed hydroid or sea spleenwort, is a branching colonial hydroid in the family Sertulariidae.

== Description ==
Jointed hydroids look like a child's drawing of a Christmas tree. They have an upright stem with side branches that emerge in pairs and extend upwards from the 'trunk'. The branches all grow in one plane. The colony is usually 4–8 cm in total height but may grow to 22 cm.

== Distribution ==
This colonial animal is found off the length of the South African coast down to 135m under water. It is also found at Vema Seamount.

== Ecology ==
Jointed hydroids live in sheltered areas and are common on the southern Cape coast. The reproductive bodies are ovoid with a distinct depression in their apex.

== Synonyms ==
The following species are considered synonyms of Thuiaria articulata:

- Dymella articulata (Pallas, 1766) (synonym)
- Salacia articulata (Pallas, 1766) (Synonym)
- Sertularia articulata Pallas, 1766 (basionym)
- Sertularia lonchitis Ellis & Solander, 1786 (synonym)
- Thuiaria barentsi Naumov, 1960 (synonym)
- Thuiaria lichenastrum (Linnaeus, 1758) (synonym)
- Thuiaria lonchitis (Ellis & Solander, 1786) (synonym)
