= Sertularellidae =

Scientific classification
- Kingdom: Animalia
- Phylum: Cnidaria
- Class: Hydrozoa
- Order: Leptothecata
- Superfamily: Sertularioidea
- Family: Sertularellidae; Maronna et al., 2016

Genera
- See text

Family of hydrozoans

Sertularellidae is a family of hydrozoans.

== Genera ==
According to the World Register of Marine Species, the following genera belong to this family:

- Calamphora Allman, 1888
- Sertularella Gray, 1848
