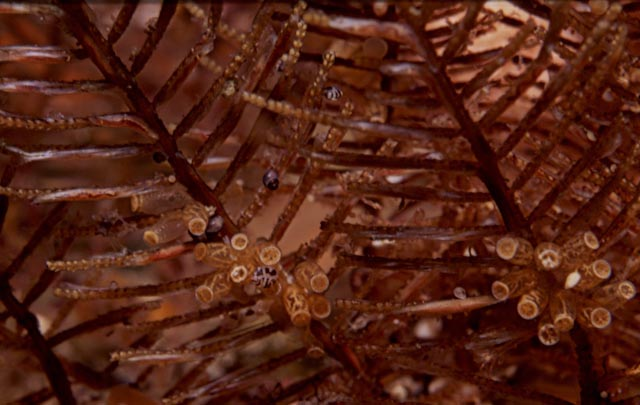
- Thuiaria articulata

Scientific classification
- Kingdom: Animalia
- Phylum: Cnidaria
- Class: Hydrozoa
- Order: Leptothecata
- Superfamily: Sertularioidea
- Family: Sertulariidae; Lamouroux, 1812

Genera
- See text

= Sertulariidae =

Family of hydrozoans

Sertulariidae is a family of hydrozoans.

== Genera ==
According to the World Register of Marine Species, the following genera belong to this family:

- Abietinaria Kirchenpauer, 1884
- Amphisbetia L. Agassiz, 1862
- Caledoniana Galea, 2015
- Caminothujaria von Campenhausen, 1896
- Crateritheca Stechow, 1921
- Dictyocladium Allman, 1888
- Diphasia Agassiz, 1862
- Dynamena Lamouroux, 1812
- Fraseroscyphus Boero & Bouillon, 1993
- Geminella Billiard, 1925
- Gigantotheca Vervoort & Watson, 2003
- Gonaxia Vervoort, 1993
- Hydrallmania Hincks, 1868
- Hypopyxis Allman, 1888
- Idiellana Cotton & Godfrey, 1942
- Mixoscyphus Peña Cantero & Vervoort, 2005
- Papilionella Antsulevich & Vervoort, 1993
- Polysertularella Antsulevich, 2011
- Salacia Lamouroux, 1816
- Sertularia Linnaeus, 1758
- Solenoscyphus Galea, 2015
- Stereotheca Stechow, 1919
- Tamarisca Kudelin, 1914
- Tasmanaria Watson & Vervoort, 2001
- Thuiaria Fleming, 1828
