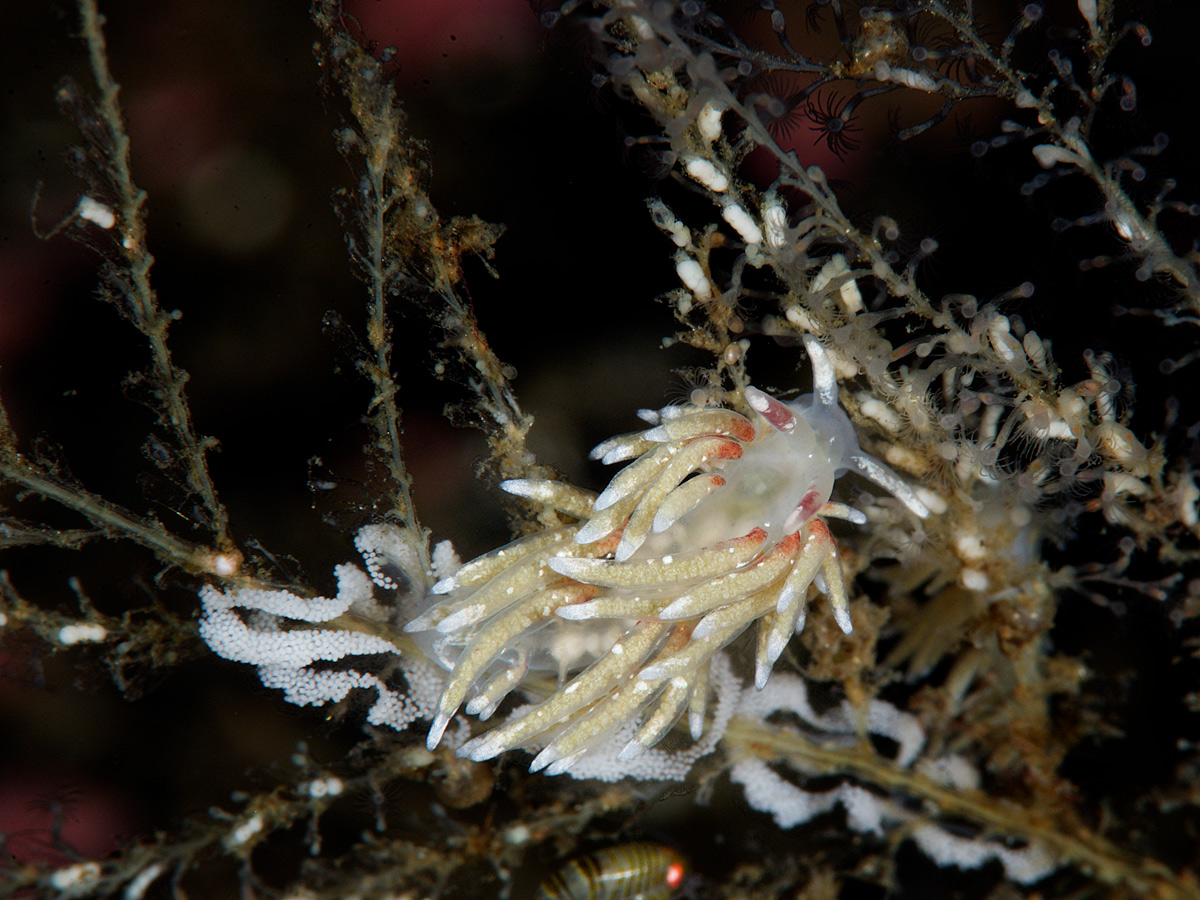
- Rubramoena rubescens, Gulen Dive Centre, Norway

Scientific classification
- Kingdom: Animalia
- Phylum: Mollusca
- Class: Gastropoda
- Order: Nudibranchia
- Suborder: Aeolidacea
- Family: Trinchesiidae
- Genus: Rubramoena
- Species: R. rubescens

Binomial name
- Rubramoena rubescens Picton & Brown, 1978

Synonyms
- Cuthona rubescens (Picton & Brown, 1978)

= Rubramoena rubescens =

Species of gastropod

Rubramoena rubescens is a species of sea slug, an aeolid nudibranch, a marine gastropod mollusc in the family Trinchesiidae.

== Distribution ==
This species was described from St. John's Point, Dunkineely, County Donegal, Ireland. It has been reported from the NE Atlantic from Norway south to Cornwall.

== Description ==
The typical adult size of this species is 12–15 mm. It is very similar to Rubramoena amoena, apart from differences in the colour pattern.

== Habitat ==
Rubramoena rubescens feeds on hydroids of the genus Halecium especially Halecium halecinum.
