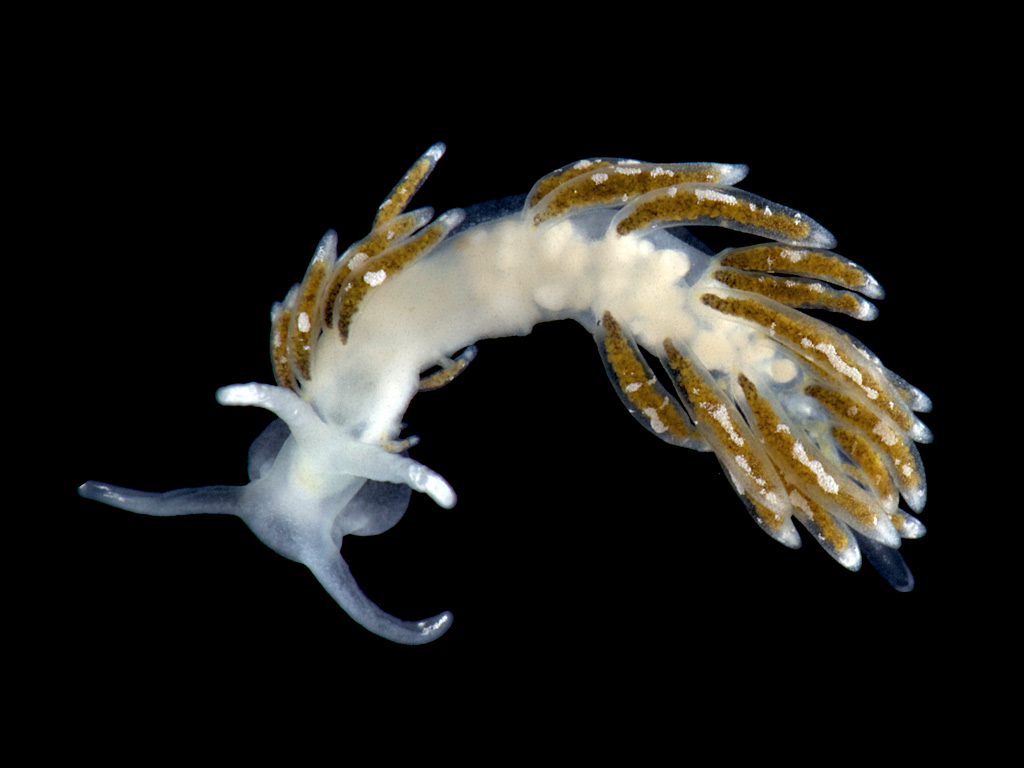
- The nudibranch Zelentia pustulata, Strangford Lough, Co Down, Northern Ireland.

Scientific classification
- Kingdom: Animalia
- Phylum: Mollusca
- Class: Gastropoda
- Order: Nudibranchia
- Suborder: Aeolidacea
- Family: Trinchesiidae
- Genus: Zelentia
- Species: Z. pustulata

Binomial name
- Zelentia pustulata (Alder & Hancock, 1854)

Synonyms
- Eolis pustulata (Alder & Hancock, 1854); Cuthona pustulata (Alder & Hancock, 1854); Tenellia pustulata (Alder & Hancock, 1854)

= Zelentia pustulata =

Species of gastropod

Zelentia pustulata is a species of sea slug, an aeolid nudibranch, a marine gastropod mollusc in the family Trinchesiidae.

== Distribution ==
This species was described from Cullercoats, North Sea, England. It has been reported from the NE Atlantic from Orkney south to Lundy Island in the Bristol Channel. Also reported from the Atlantic coast of North America. This species has been reported from Maine, the Barents Sea and the White Sea.

== Ecology ==
Zelentia pustulata feeds on the hydroid Halecium muricatum, family Haleciidae.
