= Hydrophore =

A hydrophore may refer to:

- Hydrophore (system), a system used in tall buildings and marine environments to maintain water pressure; see Water supply
- Hydrophore (zoology), see Haleciidae

== See also ==
- Hydraulic accumulator
- Hydrophobe
- Hydrophone
