= Endothecium =

Endothecium may refer to:

- Endothecium, a type of tissue in anthers that leads to dehiscence
- Endothecium, a synonym for a genus of hydrozoans, Halecium
