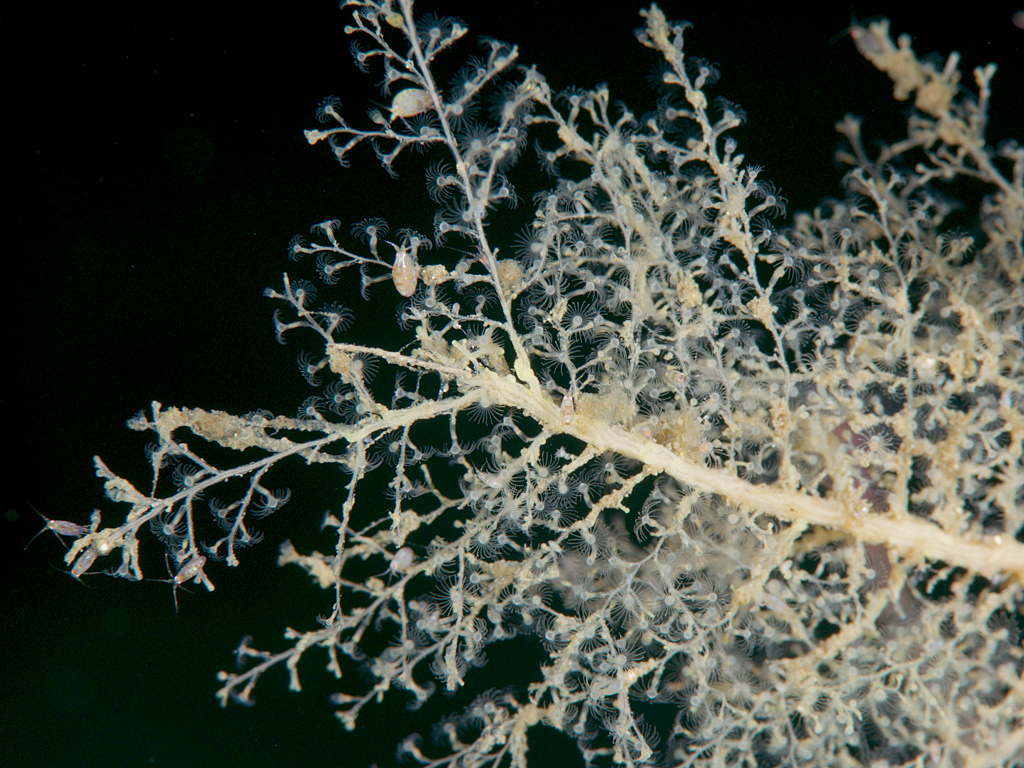

Scientific classification
- Domain: Eukaryota
- Kingdom: Animalia
- Phylum: Cnidaria
- Class: Hydrozoa
- Order: Leptothecata
- Family: Haleciidae
- Genus: Halecium
- Species: H. muricatum

Binomial name
- Halecium muricatum (Ellis & Solander, 1786)

= Halecium muricatum =

Species of hydrozoan

Halecium muricatum, commonly known as the sea hedgehog hydroid, is a species of hydrozoan in the family Haleciidae. It occurs mainly in arctic and northern temperate waters, in both the Atlantic and Pacific Oceans.

== Description ==
Halecium muricatum is a colonial hydrozoan. It is arborescent, forming stiff bushy colonies usually between 80 and 130 mm (3 and 5 in) in height but sometimes 200 mm (8 in). The main stems are robust and mostly straight, with a few large side branches diverging irregularly, each forming an angle of 30° with the main stem. Finer tertiary branches are formed as the polyps each elongate and bud new polyps on alternate sides of the often single plane branch; there is a clearly defined node between each segment. Gonothecae (reproductive structures) develop on the stem and main branches; both male and female gonathecae are ovate and covered with rows of spines and appear identical. The colony is typically yellowish.

== Distribution and habitat ==
Halecium muricatum is found in the northwestern Atlantic Ocean and the northern Pacific Ocean. It is mainly an arctic and northern temperate species and is present in Greenland and Iceland. In America its range extends southwards to Cape Hatteras and it is also present in Alaska and in the seas around Siberia. In Europe it extends southwards as far as the British Isles. Here its range extends from the western coast of Scotland southward to West Wales where it occurs around Lundy Island and Skomer Island; it is commonest in Scotland and tends to occur only in exposed locations further south. It chiefly grows in gullies and on vertical rock faces, at depths between 10 and 1,350 m (30 and 4,430 ft).

== Ecology ==
This hydrozoan is predated by the nudibranch Zelentia pustulata, which feeds almost exclusively on it, and winds its egg coils around its branches.
