= Hemitheca =

Scientific classification
- Domain: Eukaryota
- Kingdom: Animalia
- Phylum: Cnidaria
- Class: Hydrozoa
- Order: Leptothecata
- Family: Haleciidae
- Genus: Hemitheca; Hilgendorf, 1898

Genus of hydrozoans

Hemitheca is a genus of cnidarians belonging to the family Haleciidae.

Species:

- Hemitheca intermedia Hilgendorf, 1898
