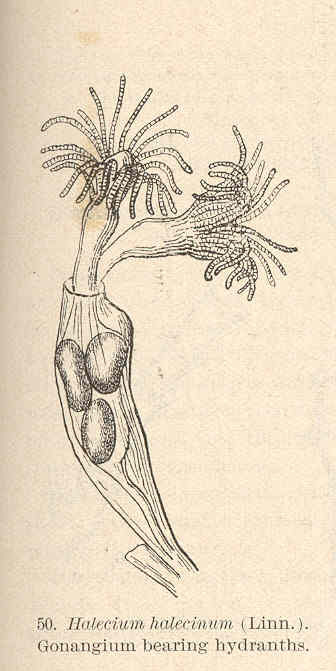

Scientific classification
- Kingdom: Animalia
- Phylum: Cnidaria
- Class: Hydrozoa
- Order: Leptothecata
- Family: Haleciidae
- Genus: Halecium
- Species: H. halecinum

Binomial name
- Halecium halecinum (Linnaeus, 1758)

Synonyms
- Halecium geniculatum Norman, 1867; Halecium halecium (Linnaeus, 1758; Sertularia halecina Linnaeus, 1758; Thoa halecina (Linnaeus, 1758)

= Halecium halecinum =

Species of hydrozoan

Halecium halecinum, commonly known as the herring-bone hydroid, is a species of hydrozoan in the family Haleciidae. It is native to the eastern Atlantic Ocean, the western Atlantic Ocean and the eastern Pacific Ocean.

== Description ==
This hydroid grows to a maximum height of 25 cm (10 in) but a more typical height is 10 cm (4 in). The colony grows in a single plane with stiff erect stems growing from a fibrous base. The growth is pinnate, with alternate secondary branches which are parallel to one another and join the main stem at an angle of about 50°, giving a herring-bone appearance. These in turn have stubby tertiary branches which bear the hydrothecae (feeding polyps); these grow on alternate sides of the stem, forming short, equal-length segments, separated by transverse nodes. The polyps are large and goblet-shaped, with down-turned rims. The reproductive gonothecae are borne on the upper surfaces of the branches, the male structures being ovoid and club-shaped, while the female ones are oblong, with tapering bases and broad flat upper surfaces with apertures in the corners.

== Distribution and habitat ==
This hydroid is known from the eastern Atlantic Ocean, the western Atlantic Ocean and the eastern Pacific Ocean. Its range extends from Spitsbergen, through the Mediterranean Sea and the coasts of Western Europe and West Africa to South Africa. It is also present in western Iceland and eastern Greenland, and southwards along the eastern coasts of North America to the Caribbean Sea and Colombia. In the eastern Pacific Ocean its range extends from Alaska to California and it is also present in the Mollucas, Japan and the Sea of Okhotsk. It grows on hard surfaces such as shells and stones in the shallow sub-littoral zone and in deeper water.

== Research ==
Research has shown that there are two types of hydrothecae with different behaviours. The second type has a longer, extensible column and fewer, shorter, thicker tentacles armed with larger stinging cells. It can twist and coil during extension, and contract by bulging and folding while still remaining extended; both types of polyp can catch and ingest planktonic particles, but the extensible one is able to writhe around and explore a greater volume of water. It is probably used in defence and may also have an excretory or sensory function. Such polyp dimorphism has been reported in three other species of hydroid.
