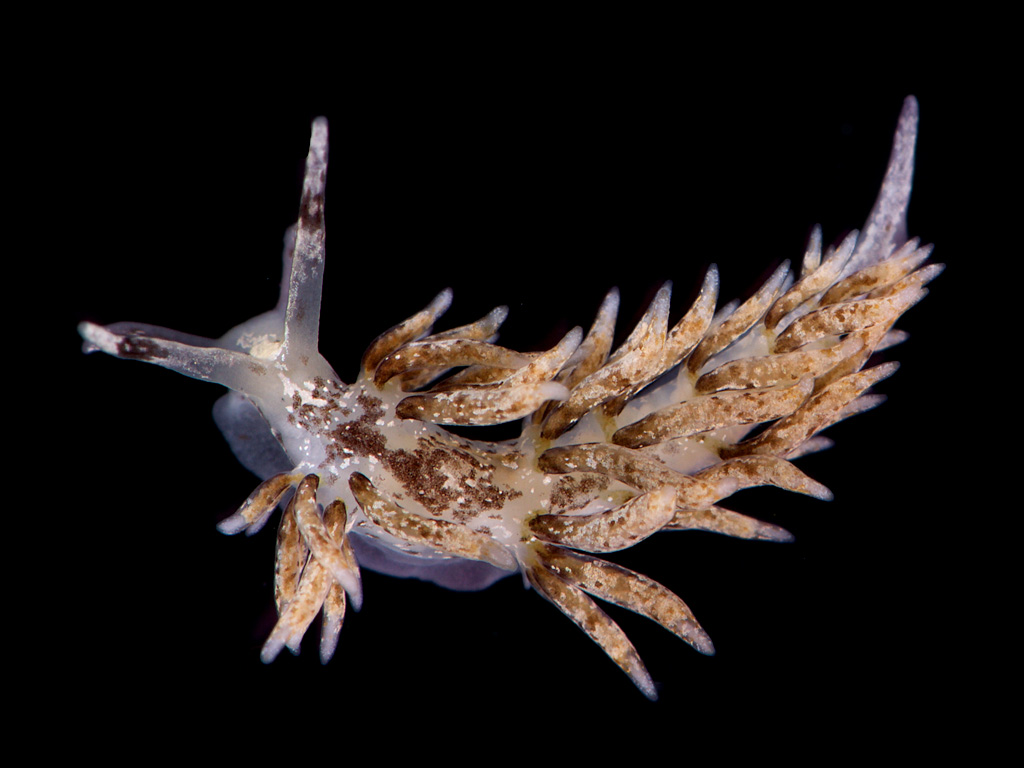

Scientific classification
- Kingdom: Animalia
- Phylum: Mollusca
- Class: Gastropoda
- Order: Nudibranchia
- Suborder: Aeolidacea
- Family: Trinchesiidae
- Genus: Rubramoena; Cella, Carmona, Ekimova, Chichvarkhin, Schepetov & Gosliner, 2016

Type species
- Eolis amoena MacFarland, 1966

= Rubramoena =

Genus of gastropods

Rubramoena is a genus of sea slugs, aeolid nudibranchs, marine gastropod molluscs in the family Trinchesiidae.

Species within the genus Rubramoena include:

- Rubramoena amoena (Alder & Hancock, 1845)
- Rubramoena rubescens (Picton & Brown, 1978)
