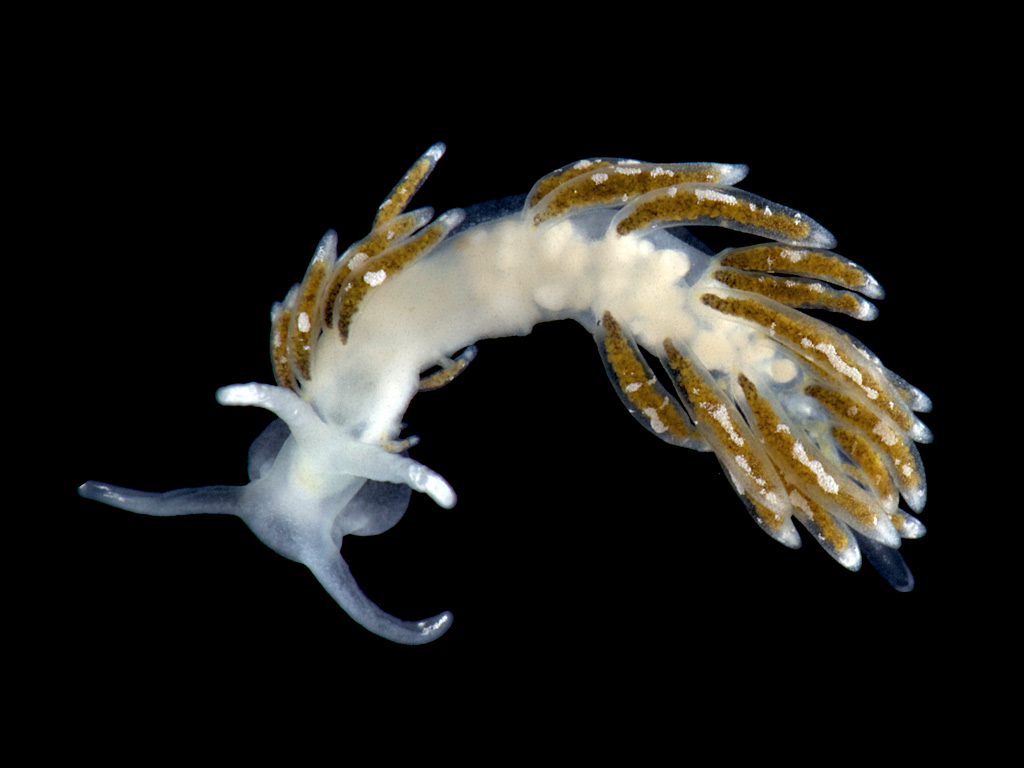
- The nudibranch Zelentia pustulata, Strangford Lough, Co Down, Northern Ireland.

Scientific classification
- Kingdom: Animalia
- Phylum: Mollusca
- Class: Gastropoda
- Order: Nudibranchia
- Suborder: Aeolidacea
- Family: Trinchesiidae
- Genus: Zelentia; Korshunova, Martynov & Picton, 2017

= Zelentia =

Genus of gastropods

Zelentia is a genus of sea slugs, aeolid nudibranchs, marine gastropod molluscs in the family Trinchesiidae.In 2024, the genus was synonymized with Tenellia and all former Zelentia species followed, only for it to be reinstated the following year in 2025.

Zelentia species feed on hydroids.

== Species ==
According to Korshunova et al. (2025), species within the genus Zelentia include:

- Zelentia amoris Korshunova & Martynov, 2022
- Zelentia fulgens (MacFarland, 1966) - shiny aeolid
- Zelentia nepunicea Korshunova, Fletcher, Lundin, Picton & Martynov, 2018
- Zelentia ninel Korshunova, Martynov & Picton, 2017
- Zelentia pustulata (Alder & Hancock, 1854)
- Zelentia roginskae Korshunova, Fletcher, Lundin, Picton & Martynov, 2018
- Zelentia willowsi Korshunova, Fletcher, Lundin, Picton & Martynov, 2018
