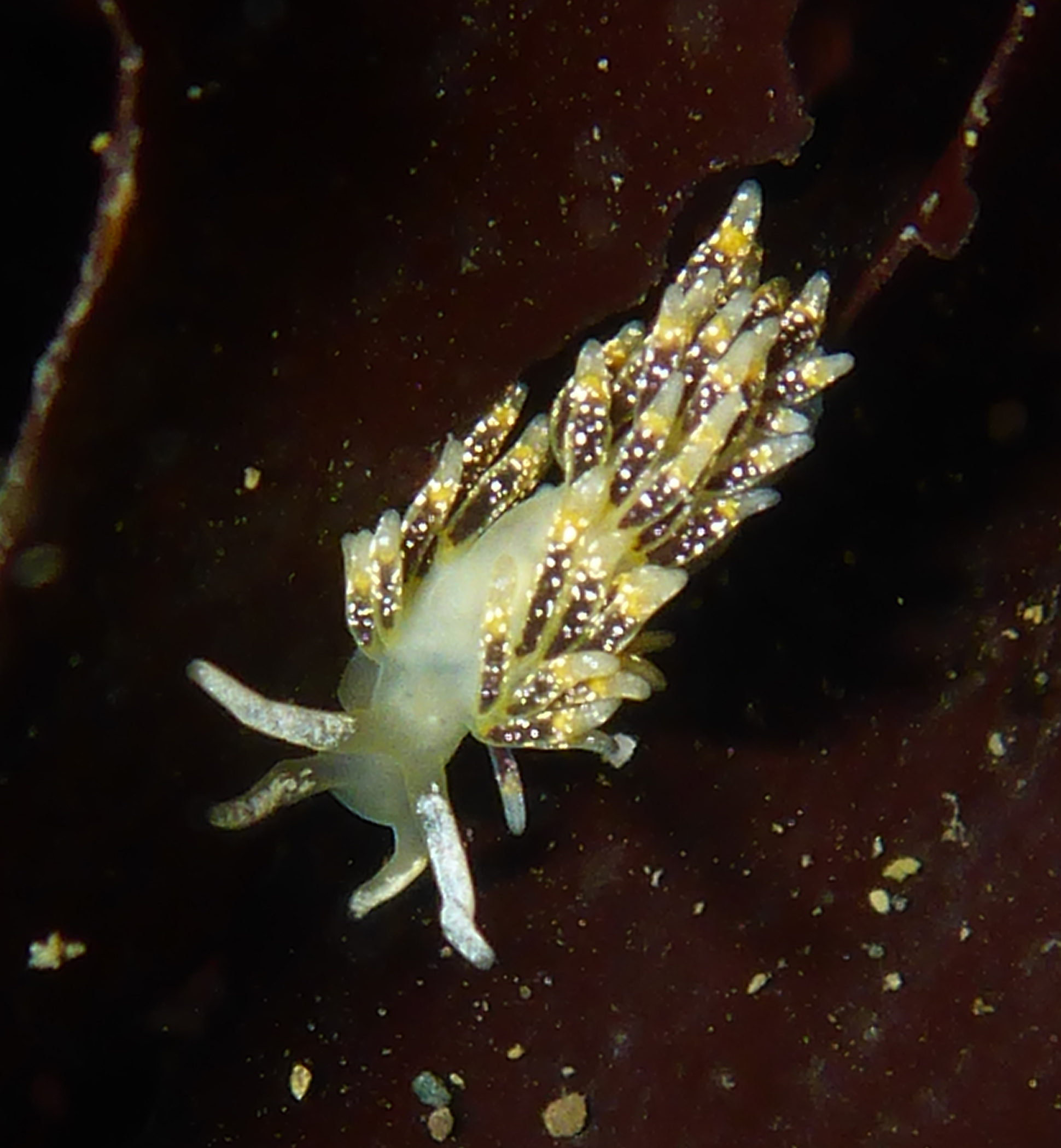
- Pillar Point, California, USA

Scientific classification
- Kingdom: Animalia
- Phylum: Mollusca
- Class: Gastropoda
- Order: Nudibranchia
- Suborder: Aeolidacea
- Family: Trinchesiidae
- Genus: Zelentia
- Species: Z. fulgens

Binomial name
- Zelentia fulgens (MacFarland, 1966)

Synonyms
- Cratena fulgens (MacFarland, 1966); Cuthona fulgens (MacFarland, 1966); Tenellia fulgens (MacFarland, 1966)

= Zelentia fulgens =

Species of gastropod

Zelentia fulgens, the shiny aeolid, is a species of sea slug, an aeolid nudibranch, a marine gastropod mollusc in the family Trinchesiidae.

== Distribution ==
This species was described from Point Pinos, Monterey Bay, California, United States. It has been recorded along the Eastern Pacific coastline of North America from Kayostia Beach, Clallam County, Washington state to Shell Beach, San Luis Obispo, California.
