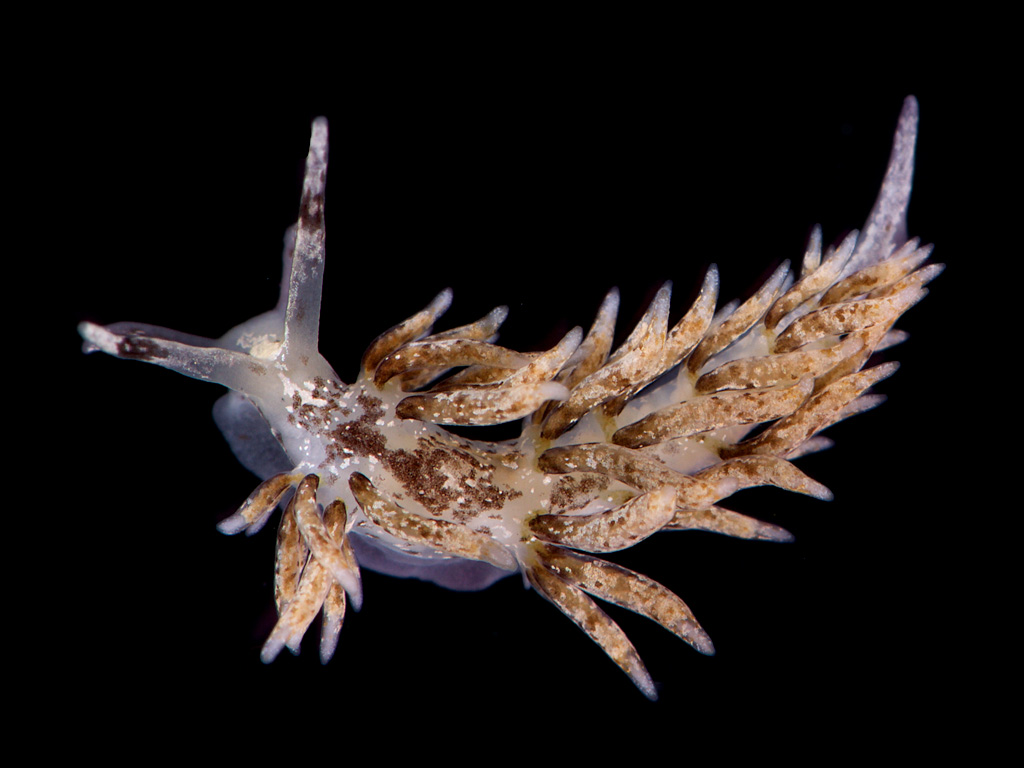
- The nudibranch Rubramoena amoena, Strangford Lough, Co. Down, Northern Ireland.

Scientific classification
- Kingdom: Animalia
- Phylum: Mollusca
- Class: Gastropoda
- Order: Nudibranchia
- Suborder: Aeolidacea
- Family: Trinchesiidae
- Genus: Rubramoena
- Species: R. amoena

Binomial name
- Rubramoena amoena (Alder & Hancock, 1845)

Synonyms
- Eolis amoena Alder & Hancock, 1845; Cuthona amoena (Alder & Hancock, 1845)

= Rubramoena amoena =

Species of gastropod

Rubramoena amoena is a species of sea slug, an aeolid nudibranch, a marine gastropod mollusc in the family Trinchesiidae.

== Distribution ==
This species was described from Torbay, Devon, England. It has been reported from the NE Atlantic from Orkney south to Portugal and in the Mediterranean Sea.

== Description ==
The typical adult size of this species is 5–12 mm.

== Habitat ==
Rubramoena amoena feeds on hydroids of the genus Halecium.
