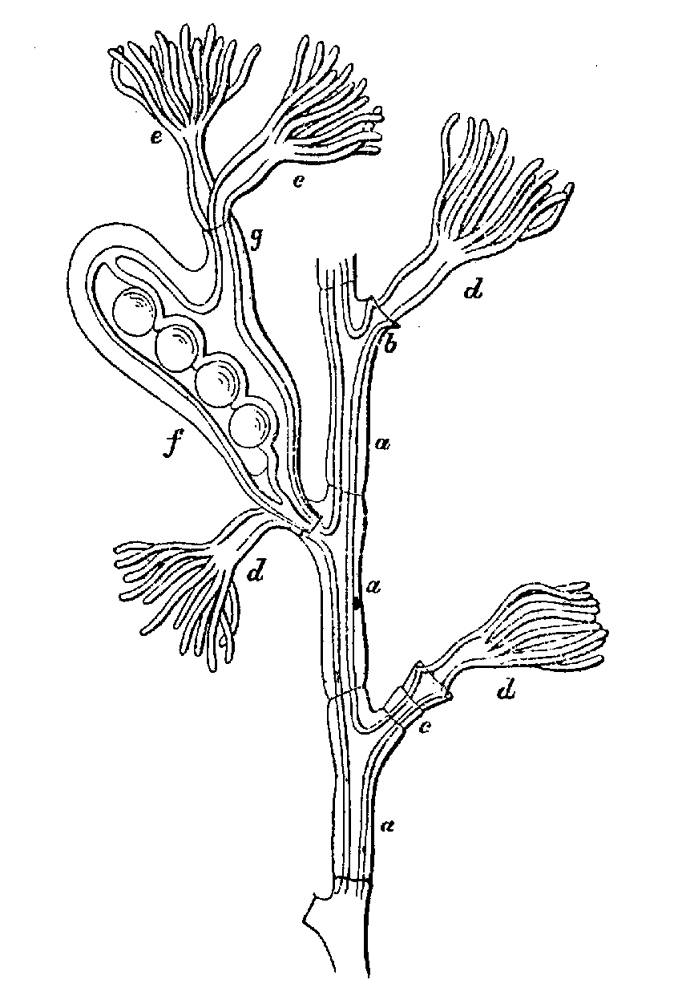
- Portion of female colony of Halecium beanii

Scientific classification
- Kingdom: Animalia
- Phylum: Cnidaria
- Class: Hydrozoa
- Order: Leptothecata
- Family: Haleciidae
- Genus: Halecium; Oken, 1815

Synonyms
- Thoa Lamouroux, 1816; Baleum Billard, 1929; Endothecium Fraser, 1935; Sagamihydra Hirohito, 1995

= Halecium =

Genus of hydrozoans

Halecium is a genus of hydrozoans in the family Haleciidae. These marine invertebrates are found in all oceans, where they often form large colonies.

== Species ==
Halecium currently contains 135 confirmed species.

- Halecium amphibolum Watson, 1993
- Halecium annulatum Torrey, 1902
- Halecium annuliforme Galea & Schories, 2012
- Halecium antarcticum Vanhöffen, 1910
- Halecium arcticum Ronowicz & Schuchert, 2007
- Halecium argentum Clarke, 1894
- Halecium articulosum Clark, 1875
- Halecium banyulense Motz-Kossowska, 1912
- Halecium banzare Watson, 2008
- Halecium beanii (Johnston, 1838)
- Halecium bermudense Congdon, 1907
- Halecium birulai Spassky, 1929
- Halecium bithecum Watson, 2005
- Halecium brashnikowi Linko, 1911
- Halecium brevithecum Watson, 2008
- Halecium bruniensis Watson, 1975
- Halecium calderi Galea, 2010
- Halecium conicum Stechow, 1919
- Halecium corrugatissimum Trebilcock, 1928
- Halecium corrugatum Nutting, 1899
- Halecium crinis Stechow, 1913
- Halecium curvicaule Lorenz, 1886
- Halecium cymiforme Allman, 1888
- Halecium cymosum Fraser, 1935
- Halecium delicatulum Coughtrey, 1876
- Halecium densum Calkins, 1899
- Halecium dichotomum Allman, 1888
- Halecium diminutivum Fraser, 1942
- Halecium discoidum Galea, 2013
- Halecium dubium Fraser, 1941
- Halecium dufresnae Millard, 1977
- Halecium dyssymetrum Billard, 1929
- Halecium edwardsianum (d'Orbigny, 1842)
- Halecium elegantulum Watson, 2008
- Halecium erratum Galea, Försterra, Häussermann & Schories, 2014
- Halecium exaggeratum Peña Cantero, Boero & Piraino, 2013
- Halecium exiguum Fraser, 1948
- Halecium expansum Trebilcock, 1928
- Halecium fasciculatum Fraser, 1938
- Halecium fijiensis Watson, 2015
- Halecium filicula Allman, 1877
- Halecium fjordlandicum Galea, 2007
- Halecium flabellatum Fraser, 1935
- Halecium flexum Fraser, 1948
- Halecium fragile Hodgson, 1950
- Halecium fraseri Ralph, 1958
- Halecium frigidum Peña Cantero, 2010
- Halecium galeatum Billard, 1937
- Halecium groenlandicum Kramp, 1911
- Halecium halecinum (Linnaeus, 1758)
- Halecium harrimani Nutting, 1901
- Halecium humeriformis Galea & Schories, 2014
- Halecium humile Pictet, 1893
- Halecium incertus Naumov & Stepanjants, 1962
- Halecium inhacae Millard, 1958
- Halecium insolens Fraser, 1938
- Halecium interpolatum Ritchie, 1907
- Halecium irregulare Bonnevie, 1899
- Halecium jaederholmi Vervoort, 1972
- Halecium kofoidi Torrey, 1902
- Halecium labiatum Billard, 1933
- Halecium labrosum Alder, 1859
- Halecium laeve Kramp, 1932
- Halecium lamourouxianum (d'Orbigny, 1842)
- Halecium lankesterii (Bourne, 1890)
- Halecium lenticulare Trebilcock, 1928
- Halecium lightbourni Calder, 1991
- Halecium linkoi Antsulevich, 1980
- Halecium liouvillei Billard, 1934
- Halecium lucium Antsulevich, 1979
- Halecium luteum Watson, 1975
- Halecium macrocaulus Watson, 2008
- Halecium macrocephalum Allman, 1877
- Halecium marsupiale Bergh, 1887
- Halecium maximum Galea & Schories, 2014
- Halecium mediterraneum Weismann, 1883
- Halecium minutum Broch, 1903
- Halecium mirabile Schydlowsky, 1902
- Halecium mirandus Antsulevich & Regel, 1986
- Halecium modestum Galea & Schories, 2014
- Halecium muricatum (Ellis & Solander, 1786)
- Halecium mutilum Allman, 1876
- Halecium nanum Alder, 1859
- Halecium nullinodum Fraser, 1935
- Halecium obovatum Watson, 2018
- Halecium ochotense Linko, 1911
- Halecium ornatum Nutting, 1901
- Halecium ovatum Totton, 1930
- Halecium pallens Jäderholm, 1904
- Halecium paucinodum (Fraser, 1947)
- Halecium pearsonenese Watson, 1997
- Halecium perexiguum Hirohito, 1995
- Halecium permodicum Calder, 2017
- Halecium petrosum Stechow, 1919
- Halecium planum Bonnevie, 1901
- Halecium platythecum Galea, Försterra & Häussermann, 2014
- Halecium plicatocarpum Vervoort & Watson, 2003
- Halecium plicatum Galea, 2015
- Halecium plumosum Hincks, 1868
- Halecium praeparvum Calder, 2017
- Halecium profundum Calder & Vervoort, 1998
- Halecium pseudodelicatulum Peña Cantero, 2014
- Halecium pseudoincertus Peña Cantero, 2014
- Halecium pusillum (Sars, 1857)
- Halecium pyriform Hirohito, 1995
- Halecium ralpha Watson & Vervoort, 2001
- Halecium reduplicatum (Fraser, 1935)
- Halecium regulare Fraser, 1938
- Halecium reversum Nutting, 1901
- Halecium scalariformis Billard, 1929
- Halecium scandens Nutting, 1906
- Halecium scutum Clark, 1977
- Halecium secundum Jäderholm, 1904
- Halecium sessile Norman, 1867
- Halecium sibogae Billard, 1929
- Halecium singulare (Billard, 1929)
- Halecium spatulum Watson, 2000
- Halecium speciosum Nutting, 1901
- Halecium stoloniferum Soto Angel & Peña Cantero, 2015
- Halecium tabulatum Watson, 2005
- Halecium tangaroa Peña Cantero, 2017
- Halecium telescopicum Allman, 1888
- Halecium tenellum Hincks, 1861
- Halecium tensum Fraser, 1941
- Halecium tenue Fraser, 1938
- Halecium textum Kramp, 1911
- Halecium tortile Bonnevie, 1898
- Halecium tortum Fraser, 1938
- Halecium tristaniensis Galea, 2014
- Halecium tubatum Watson, 2008
- Halecium undulatum Billard, 1921
- Halecium vagans Fraser, 1938
- Halecium vasiforme Fraser, 1935
- Halecium wilsoni Calkins, 1899
- Halecium xanthellatum Galea, 2013
