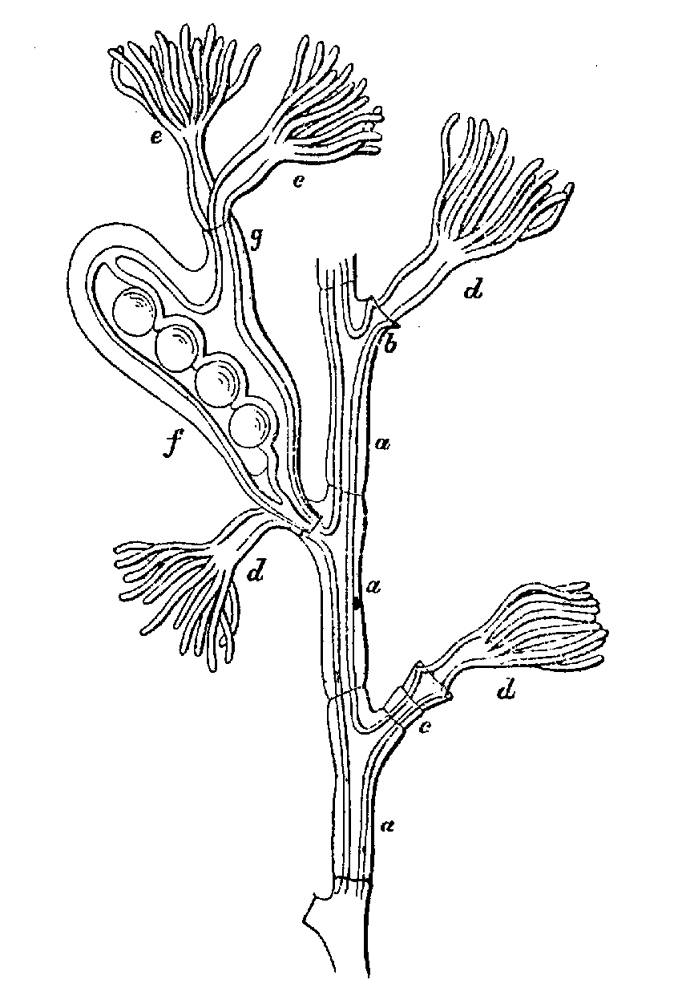
- Female colony of Halecium beanii a. Internodes of the stem. b. Simple lateral processes of an internode, supporting a hydranth. c. The same prolonged by two accessory tubes. d. Cauline or ordinary hydranths. e. Gonangial hydranths. f. Gonangium. g. Tubular orifice of gonangium.

Scientific classification
- Kingdom: Animalia
- Phylum: Cnidaria
- Class: Hydrozoa
- Subclass: Hydroidolina
- Order: Leptothecata
- Family: Haleciidae; Hincks, 1868

= Haleciidae =

Family of hydrozoans

Haleciidae is a family of hydrozoans. Their hydroid colonies emerge from a creeping hydrorhiza and usually form upright branching colonies, although some species' colonies are stolonal. Their gonophores are typically sporosacs, growing singly or bunched into a glomulus. They remain attached to the hydroids or break off to be passively drifted away; in a few, the gonophores are naked.

Some enigmatic actively swimming medusae have been tentatively placed in this family as a kind of "wastebin taxon". Should their associated hydroids turn out to belong elsewhere, they are to be moved to that family and genus. The relationships of this fairly small but distinctive radiation to other families of Leptothecata are not well understood at present. However, the family Lovenellidae, often turn out to contain the hydroid stage of medusae formerly placed in the family Haleciidae.

== Description ==
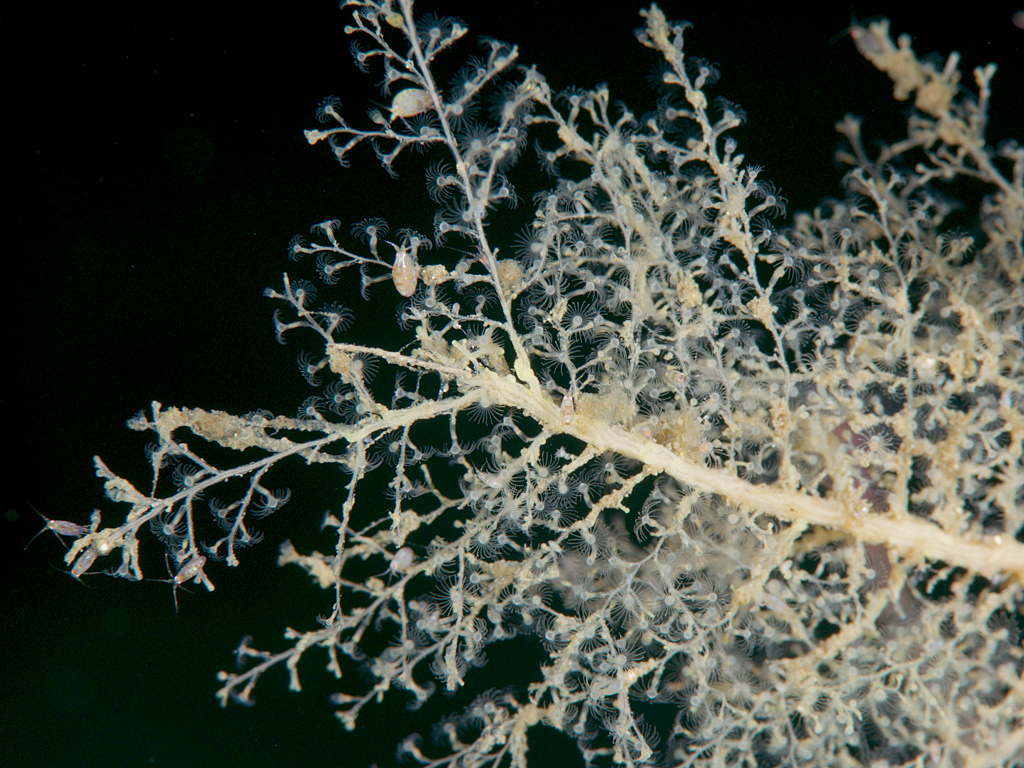
The hydroid Halecium muricatum, Norway.

The shallow, usually even-rimmed hydrothecae are sessile or borne on a hydrophore; their bottom is formed by a concentric diaphragm, with a row of small knobs distally to it. They are so small in height as to lack an operculum, but are maintained and repaired throughout the individual animal's life. The hydranths much exceed the hydrothecae in size and are quite sturdy. Their endoderm consists of a proximal digestive and a distal non-digestive section. The tentacles of some but not all carry webbing between them; likewise, the presence of nematophores, nematothecae and nematodactyls varies throughout this family.

== Genera ==
Two genera are currently recognized:

- Halecium Oken, 1815
- Nemalecium Bouillon, 1986
