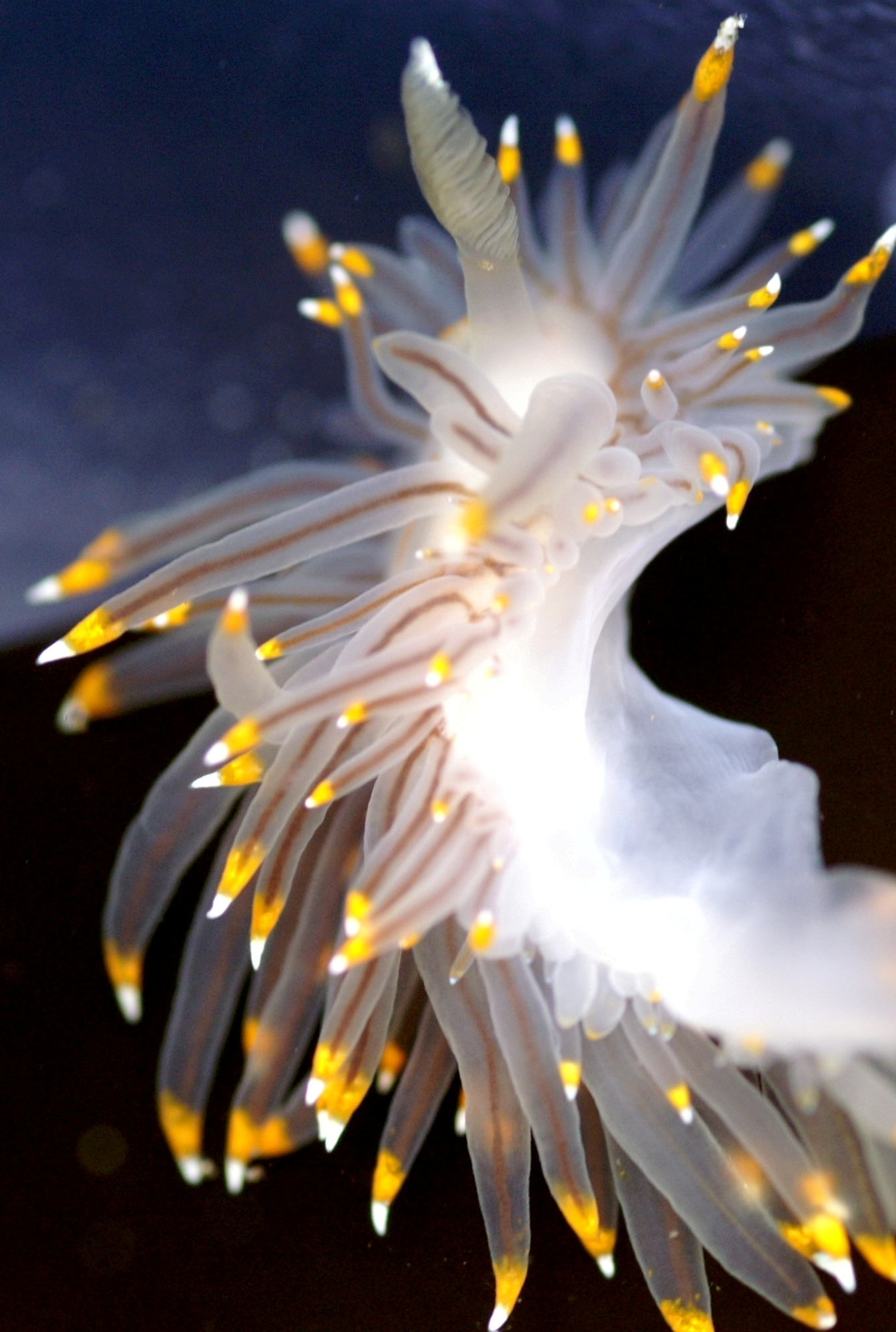
- Close-up of anterior end of Janolus fuscus, family Proctonotidae

Scientific classification
- Kingdom: Animalia
- Phylum: Mollusca
- Class: Gastropoda
- Order: Nudibranchia
- Clade: Dexiarchia; Schrödl et al., 2001

Clades
- clade Pseudoeuctenidiacea; clade Cladobranchia

= Dexiarchia =

Suborder of gastropods

The Dexiarchia are a suborder of sea slugs, shell-less marine gastropod molluscs in the order Nudibranchia. This classification is based on the study by Schrödl et al., published in 2001, who recognized within this clade two clades Pseudoeuctenidiacea and Cladobranchia.

== Taxonomy ==
=== Clade Pseudoeuctenidiacea ( = Doridoxida) ===
- Superfamily Doridoxoidea
  - Family Doridoxidae

=== Clade Cladobranchia ( = Cladohepatica) ===
Contains the subclades Euarminida, Dendronotida and Aeolidida

- Not assigned to a superfamily (Metarminoidea)
  - Family Charcotiidae
  - Family Dironidae
  - Family Embletoniidae
  - Family Goniaeolididae
  - Family Heroidae
  - Family Madrellidae
  - Family Pinufiidae
  - Family Proctonotidae

==== Subclade Euarminida ====
- Superfamily Arminoidea
  - Family Arminidae
  - Family Doridomorphidae

==== Subclade Dendronotida ====
- Superfamily Tritonioidea
  - Family Tritoniidae
  - Family Aranucidae
  - Family Bornellidae
  - Family Dendronotidae
  - Family Dotidae
  - Family Hancockiidae
  - Family Lomanotidae
  - Family Phylliroidae
  - Family Scyllaeidae
  - Family Tethydidae

==== Subclade Aeolidida ====
- Superfamily Flabellinoidea ( = Pleuroprocta)
  - Family Flabellinidae
  - Family Notaeolidiidae
- Superfamily Fionoidea
  - Family Fionidae
  - Family Calmidae
  - Family Eubranchidae
  - Family Pseudovermidae
  - Family Tergipedidae
- Superfamily Aeolidioidea
  - Family Aeolidiidae
  - Family Facelinidae
  - Family Glaucidae
  - Family Piseinotecidae
