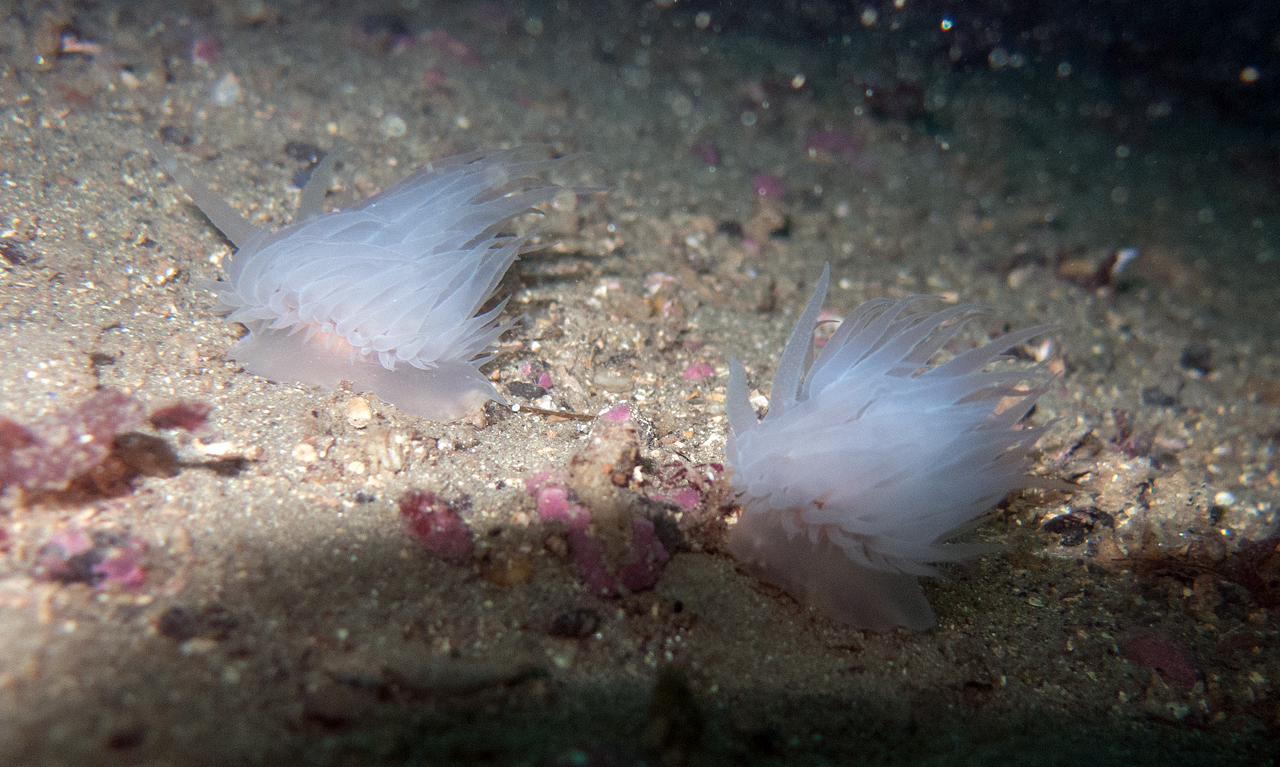
- Two individuals of Goniaeolis typica, Stokkvågen, Lurøy, Norway, 30 m.

Scientific classification
- Kingdom: Animalia
- Phylum: Mollusca
- Class: Gastropoda
- Order: Nudibranchia
- Suborder: Cladobranchia
- Superfamily: Metarminoidea; Odhner in Franc, 1968

Families
- Charcotiidae; Dironidae; Goniaeolididae; Heroidae; Proctonotidae; Madrellidae; Pinufiidae; Embletoniidae

= Metarminoidea =

Superfamily of gastropods

Metarminoidea is a provisional taxonomic superfamily of colourful sea slugs, aeolid nudibranchs, marine opisthobranch gastropod molluscs in the clade Nudibranchia.

This name is unfortunately not available as a superfamily name, because it is not based on a genus. It is used here because, as of February 2015, no replacement name has yet been proposed.

== Description ==
The nudibranchs in this superfamily share with the Aeolidida the possession of dorsal cerata. Unlike the cerata of aeolids they have either no digestive gland or short digestive gland intrusions into the cerata and no cnidosacs. In the Goniaeolididae the digestive gland is ramified beneath the skin but does not extend into the cerata. The cerata are easily cast off and are probably defensive in purpose. In the Proctonotidae the cerata are cored with extensions of the digestive gland which terminates midway up the ceras in some species and extends to the tip in others. The anus may be on the right-hand side of the body (as in aeolids) or in the middle of the back towards the tail end (as in dorids).
