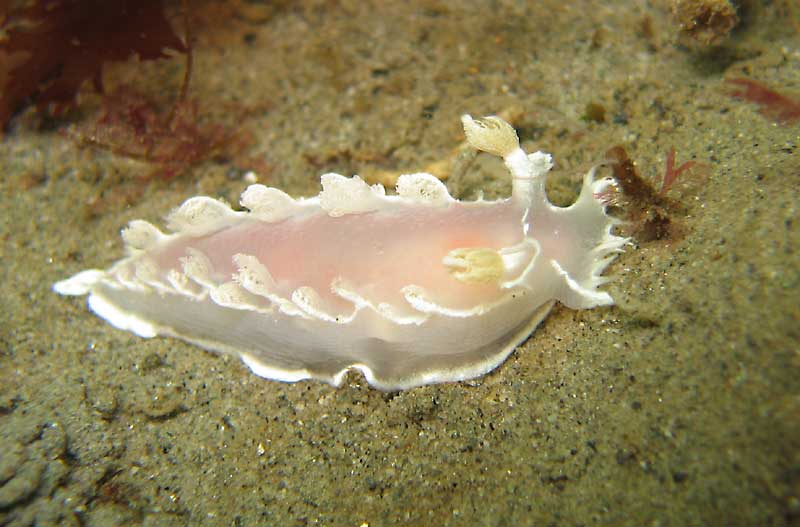
- A live individual of Tritonia festiva, head end towards the right

Scientific classification
- Domain: Eukaryota
- Kingdom: Animalia
- Phylum: Mollusca
- Class: Gastropoda
- Order: Nudibranchia
- Clade: Dexiarchia
- Suborder: Cladobranchia

Clades
- clade Metarminida; clade Euarminida; clade Dendronotida; clade Aeolidida

= Cladobranchia =

Clade of gastropods

The Cladobranchia are a taxonomic clade of nudibranchs, sea slugs, marine gastropod molluscs in the clade Dexiarchia.

== Taxonomy ==
=== clade Metarminida ===
- Superfamily Metarminoidea This name is not available as a Superfamily name as it is not based on a genus. It is used here as no replacement name has yet been proposed.
  - Family Curnonidae
  - Family Dironidae
  - Family Embletoniidae
  - Family Goniaeolididae
  - Family Heroidae
  - Family Madrellidae
  - Family Pinufiidae
  - Family Proctonotidae

=== clade Euarminida ===
- Superfamily Arminoidea
  - Family Arminidae
  - Family Doridomorphidae

=== clade Dendronotida ===
- Superfamily Tritonioidea
  - Family Tritoniidae
  - Family Aranucidae
  - Family Bornellidae
  - Family Dotidae
  - Family Dendronotidae
  - Family Hancockiidae
  - Family Lomanotidae
  - Family Phylliroidae
  - Family Scyllaeidae
  - Family Tethydidae

=== clade Aeolidida ===
- Superfamily Flabellinoidea (= Pleuroprocta)
  - Family Flabellinidae
  - Family Notaeolidiidae
- Superfamily Fionoidea
  - Family Fionidae
  - Family Calmidae
  - Family Eubranchidae
  - Family Pseudovermidae
  - Family Tergipedidae
- Superfamily Aeolidioidea
  - Family Aeolidiidae
  - Family Facelinidae
  - Family Glaucidae
  - Family Piseinotecidae
