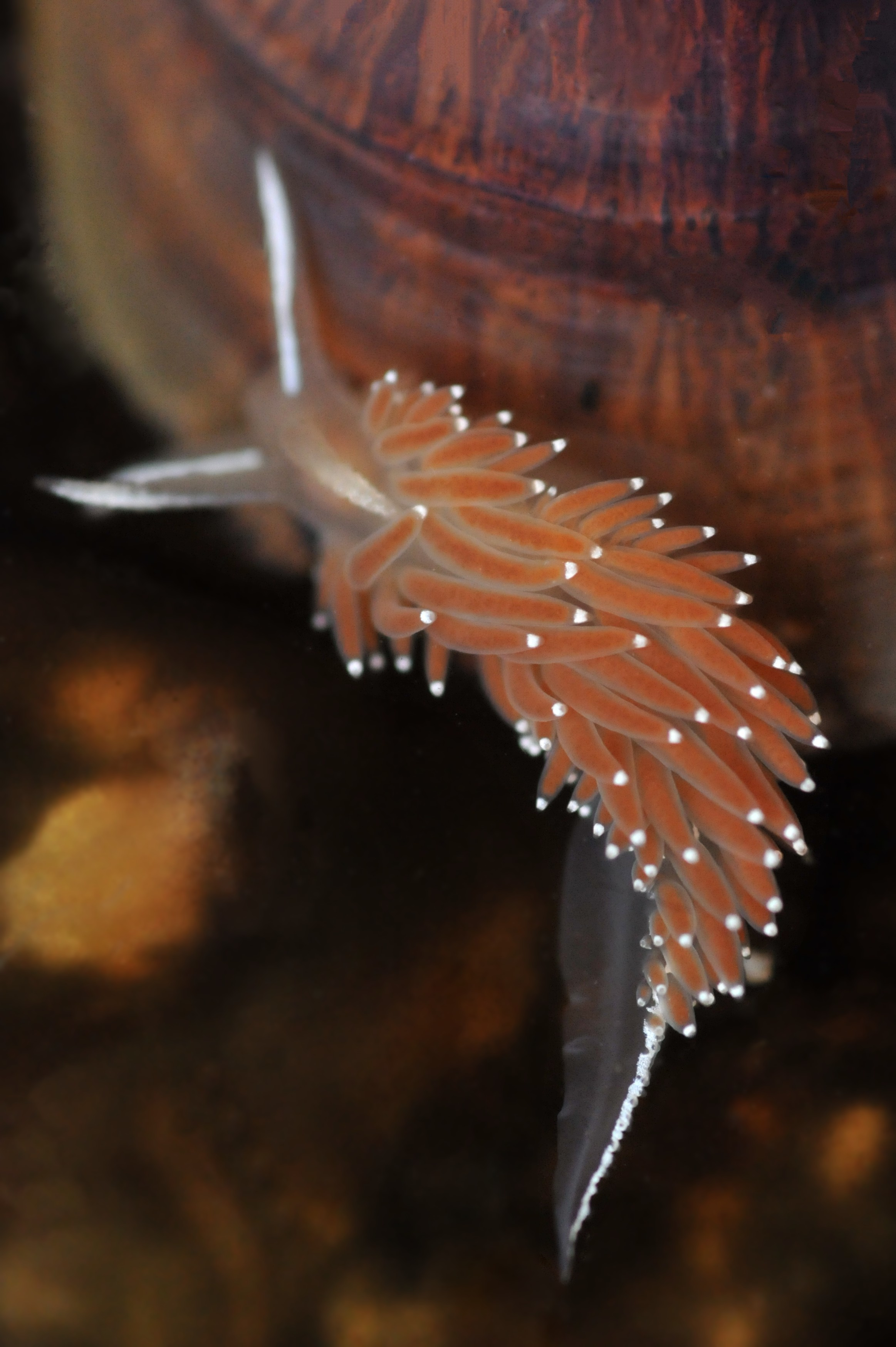
- In British Columbia, Canada

Scientific classification
- Kingdom: Animalia
- Phylum: Mollusca
- Class: Gastropoda
- Order: Nudibranchia
- Suborder: Aeolidacea
- Family: Coryphellidae
- Genus: Coryphella
- Species: C. longicaudata

Binomial name
- Coryphella longicaudata O'Donoghue, 1922

= Coryphella longicaudata =

Species of gastropod

Coryphella longicaudata is a species of sea slug, an aeolid nudibranch, a marine gastropod mollusc in the family Coryphellidae.

== Taxonomic status ==
Previously Coryphella longicaudata has been regarded as a synonym of Coryphella verrucosa, but was reinstated as its own taxon along with Coryphella pseudoverrucosa in Korshunova et al. (2025) as a result of morphological, phylogeographical, and molecular-phylogenetic analysis. In particular, the study corrected previously confused and mishandled data published in Ekimova et al. (2022) that had resulted in the erroneous synonymy, along with pointing out Ekimova et al.'s inconsistent diagnostic parameters that contradicted its own conclusions, and the evidence of datasets being copy-and-pasted without verification leading to unfounded results. Corrected material was provided in Korshunova et al.'s publication, along with extensive analysis in support of the distinction between taxa.

== Description ==
There is some morphological variation in C. longicaudata, but as there as not yet been a modern re-description encompassing these important characteristics, what follows are select details from the original 1922 account, describing specimens from the Pacific Northwest.

O'Donoghue describes C. longicaudata as "very slender, elongated and limaciform...it passes off posteriorly into a long slender tail." The dorsum is smooth, and has cerata arranged in groups along its sides, the first group beginning "to the side of and just behind the rhinophores". O'Donoghue notes his specimens have an area of the dorsum not obstructed by cerata, before the ceratal groups converge along the mid-dorsal line. The rhinophores are long, and the oral tentacles "are nearly as prominent as the rhinophores". The body, rhinophores, and oral tentacles are a translucent white. The ceratal digestive tract are "vermillion red".

In current diagnostics its body is noted as "moderately narrow" and rhinophores "smooth with small tubercles", Korshunova et al. (2025) notes that in comparison to adults of C. verrucosa and C. pseudoverrucosa, C. longicaudata "possess a longer a wider cusp [of the central teeth] with longer lateral teeth".

== Distribution ==
Coryphella longicaudata occurrences have been recorded in the Pacific Northwest on the coasts of Washington (state) and British Columbia, as well as in the Pacific Northeast within the Kuril Islands, the Sea of Okhotsk, and Kamchatka
