= Aeolid =

Aeolid may refer to:

- A descendant of Aeolus
- Aeolidida, a clade of Nudibranch (carnivorous sea slugs)
