= Proctonotus =

Scientific classification
- Kingdom: Animalia
- Phylum: Mollusca
- Class: Gastropoda
- Order: Nudibranchia
- Suborder: Cladobranchia
- Family: Proctonotidae
- Genus: Proctonotus; Alder, 1844

Species
- See text

Genus of gastropods

Proctonotus is a genus of sea slugs, or more accurately nudibranchs, marine gastropod molluscs in the family Proctonotidae.

== Species ==
Species in the genus Proctonotus include:

- Proctonotus mucroniferus (Alder & Hancock, 1844)

Species brought into synonymy

- Proctonotus affinis Burn, 1958: synonym of Caldukia affinis (Burn, 1958)
- Proctonotus orientalis Kelaart, 1858 : synonym of Polybranchia orientalis (Kelaart, 1858)
