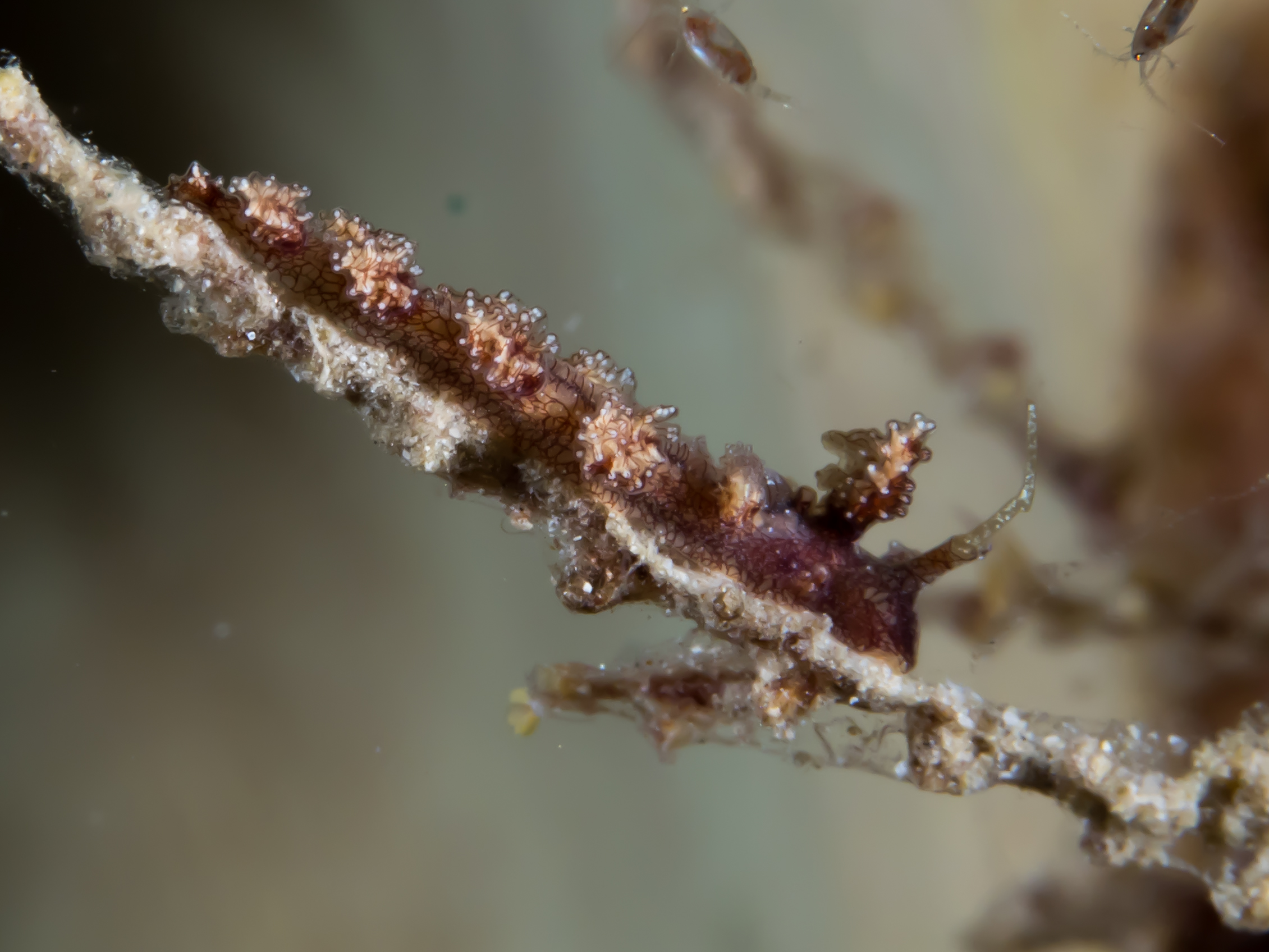
- Kabeiro rubroreticulata

Scientific classification
- Kingdom: Animalia
- Phylum: Mollusca
- Class: Gastropoda
- Order: Nudibranchia
- Suborder: Dendronotacea
- Family: Dotidae
- Genus: Kabeiro
- Species: K. rubroreticulata

Binomial name
- Kabeiro rubroreticulata Shipman & Gosliner, 2015

= Kabeiro rubroreticulata =

Species of gastropod

Kabeiro rubroreticulata is a species of sea slug, a dendronotid nudibranch, a marine gastropod mollusc in the family Dotidae.

== Distribution ==
This species was described from Panglao, Bohol Island, Philippines. It is also known from Bali, Indonesia.

== Description ==
The body of this dendronotid nudibranch is variable in colour from cream through brown to red, with a fine reticulation of red pigment on the sides, back and on the rhinophore sheaths. The cerata are irregular in shape with pseudobranchs on the inner faces. The maximum length of this species is 20 mm.

== Ecology ==
Kabeiro rubroreticulata is found on colonies of Campanulariid hydroids which grow on sea grass in 1–5 m depth.
