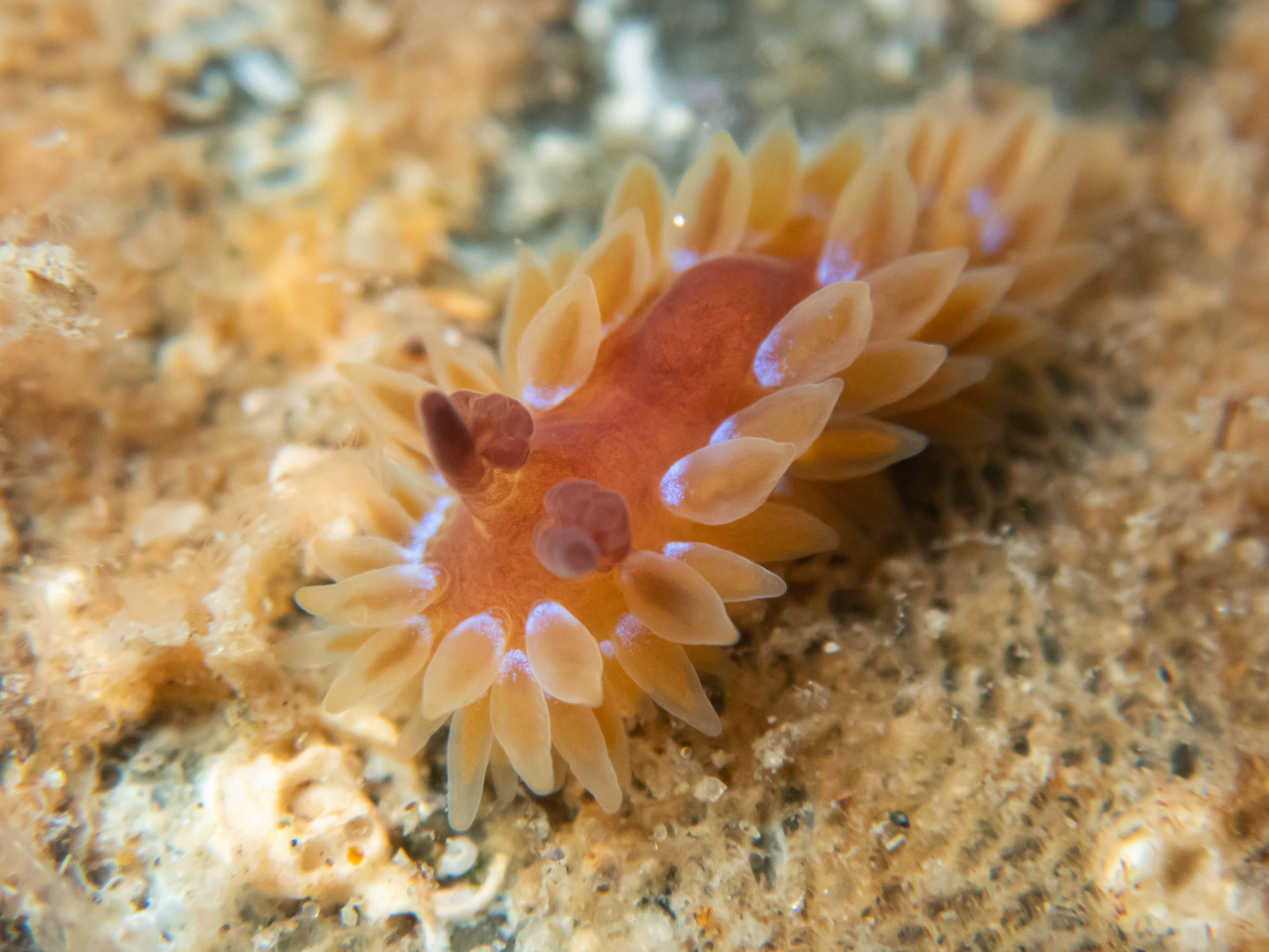
- Caldukia rubiginosa

Scientific classification
- Kingdom: Animalia
- Phylum: Mollusca
- Class: Gastropoda
- Order: Nudibranchia
- Suborder: Cladobranchia
- Family: Proctonotidae
- Genus: Caldukia; Burn & Miller, 1969

= Caldukia =

Genus of gastropods

Caldukia is a genus of sea slugs, or more accurately nudibranchs, marine gastropod molluscs, in the family Proctonotidae. One species, Caldukia affinis, is known to occur in Victoria, Australia, while the other two species are endemic to New Zealand.

== Species ==
Species in the genus Caldukia include:

- Caldukia affinis (Burn, 1958)
- Caldukia albolineata Miller, 1970
- Caldukia rubiginosa Miller, 1970
