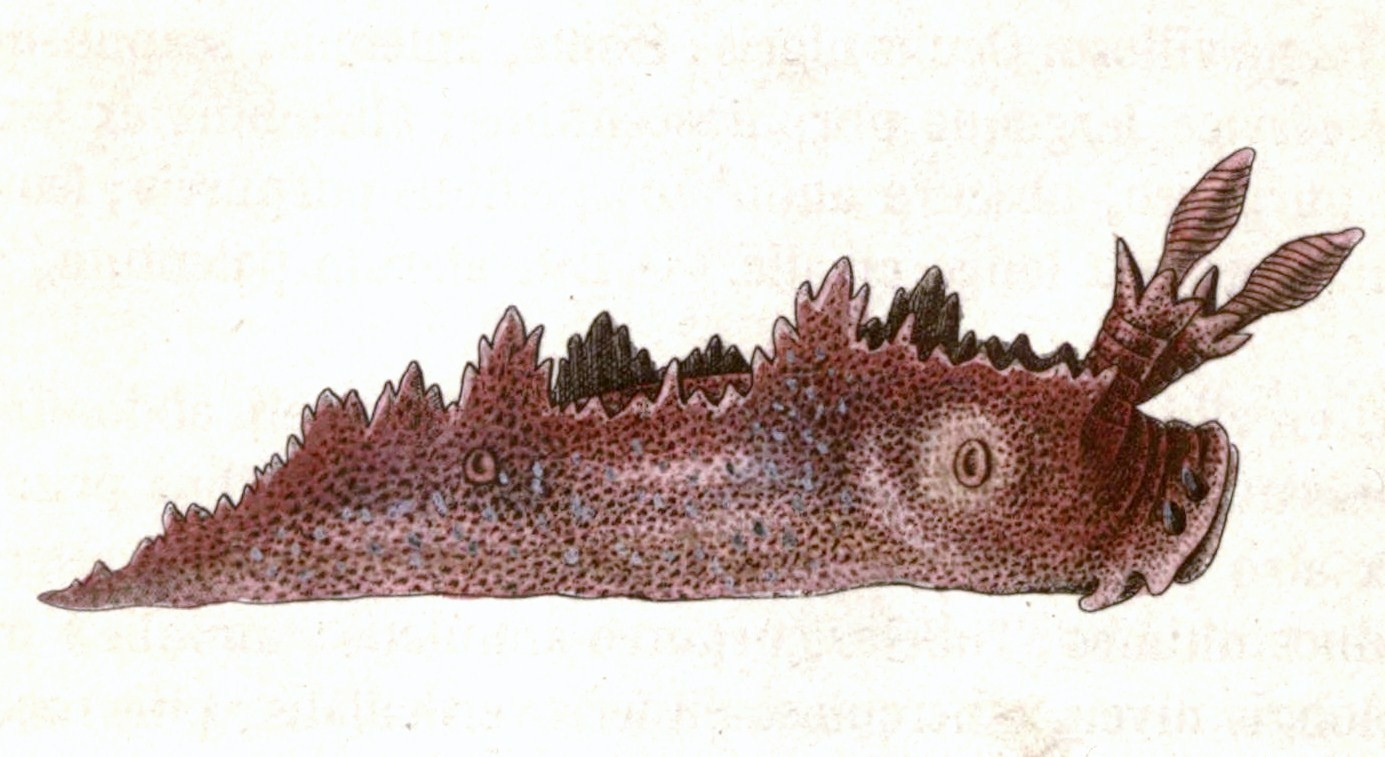
- drawing of right side view of Lomanotus genei

Scientific classification
- Domain: Eukaryota
- Kingdom: Animalia
- Phylum: Mollusca
- Class: Gastropoda
- Order: Nudibranchia
- Suborder: Cladobranchia
- Family: Tritoniidae
- Genus: Lomanotus; Vérany, 1844

= Lomanotus =

Genus of gastropods

Lomanotus is a genus of sea slugs, marine gastropod mollusks in the family Lomanotidae.

Lomanotus is the type genus of the family Lomanotidae.

== Genera ==
Species within the genus Lomanotus include:

- Lomanotus barlettai Garcia-Gomez, Lopez-Gonzalez & Garcia, 1990
- Lomanotus draconis Ortea & Cabrera, 1999
- Lomanotus genei Vérany, 1846
- Lomanotus marmoratus (Alder & Hancock, 1845)
- Lomanotus phiops Er. Marcus, 1957
- Lomanotus vermiformis Eliot, 1908
