= Kabeiro christianae =

Scientific classification
- Kingdom: Animalia
- Phylum: Mollusca
- Class: Gastropoda
- Order: Nudibranchia
- Suborder: Dendronotacea
- Family: Dotidae
- Genus: Kabeiro
- Species: K. christianae

Binomial name
- Kabeiro christianae Shipman & Gosliner, 2015

Species of gastropod

Kabeiro christianae is a species of sea slug, a dendronotid nudibranch, a marine gastropod mollusc in the family Dotidae.

== Distribution ==
This species was described from Maricaban Strait, Luzon, Philippines. It is also known from Bali, Indonesia.

== Description ==
The body of this dendronotid nudibranch is translucent, with longitudinal stripes of brown pigment on the sides and back. The cerata are irregular in shape with large transparent pseudobranchs on the inner faces. The maximum length of this species is 25 mm.

== Ecology ==
Kabeiro christianae is found on colonies of a Sertulariid hydroid.
