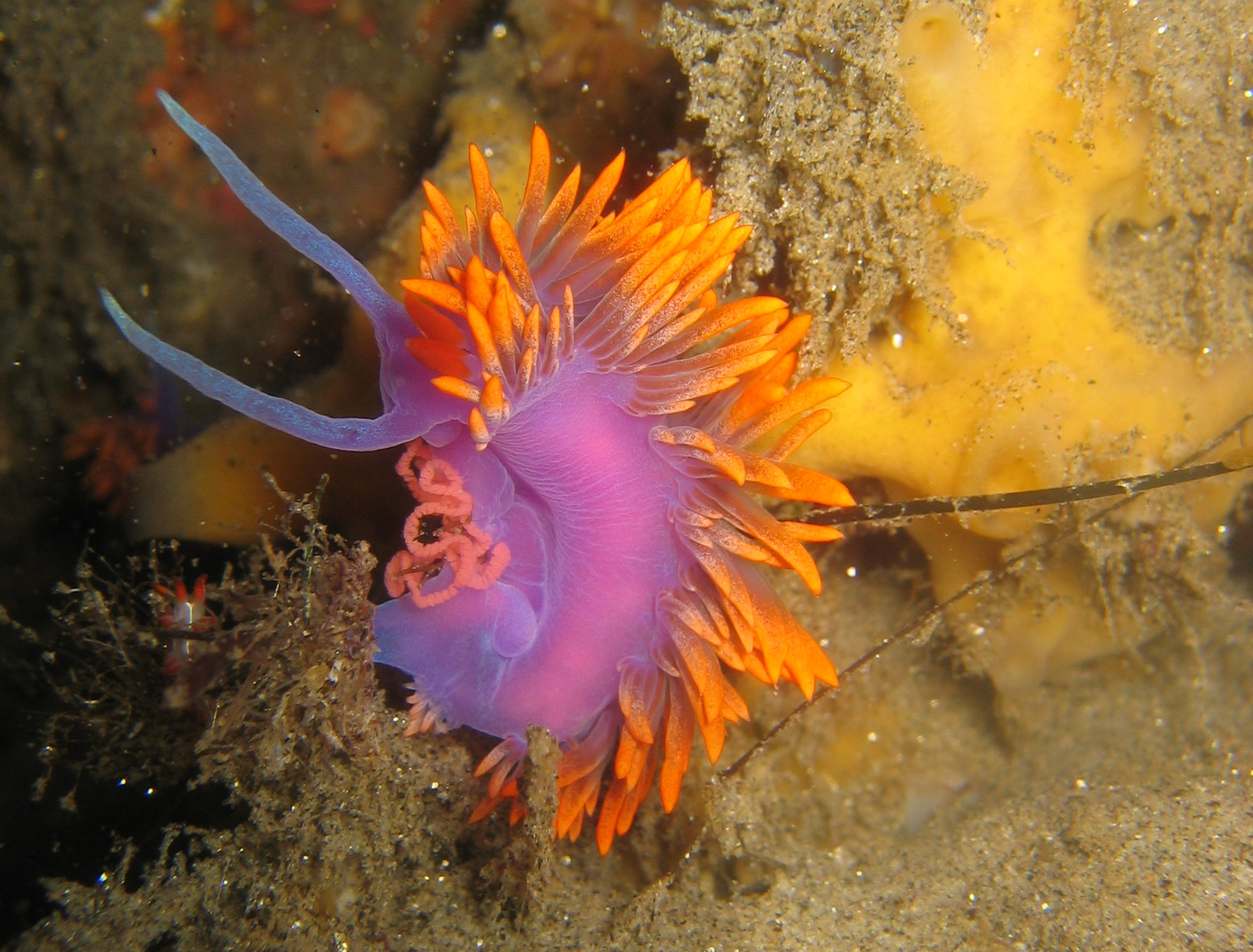
- Family Flabellinopsidae, the Spanish shawl

Scientific classification
- Kingdom: Animalia
- Phylum: Mollusca
- Class: Gastropoda
- (unranked): clade Heterobranchia clade Euthyneura clade Nudipleura clade Nudibranchia clade Dexiarchia clade Cladobranchia clade Aeolidida Cuvier, 1798

Superfamilies
- See text

= Aeolidida =

Clade of gastropods

The Aeolidida is a taxonomic clade of sea slugs, specifically aeolid nudibranchs, marine gastropod molluscs in the clade Cladobranchia. They are distinguished from other nudibranchs by their possession of cerata containing cnidosacs.

== Taxonomy ==
- Superfamily Flabellinoidea (= Pleuroprocta) Bergh, 1889
  - Family Apataidae Korshunova, Martynov, Bakken, Evertsen, Fletcher, Mudianta, Saito, Lundin, Schrödl & Picton, 2017
  - Family Coryphellidae Bergh, 1889
  - Family Cumanotidae Odhner, 1907
  - Family Flabellinidae Bergh, 1889
  - Family Flabellinopsidae Korshunova, Martynov, Bakken, Evertsen, Fletcher, Mudianta, Saito, Lundin, Schrödl & Picton, 2017
  - Family Notaeolidiidae Eliot, 1910
  - Family Paracoryphellidae M. C. Miller, 1971
  - Family Samlidae Korshunova, Martynov, Bakken, Evertsen, Fletcher, Mudianta, Saito, Lundin, Schrödl & Picton, 2017
- Superfamily Fionoidea (= Acleioprocta) Gray, 1857
  - Family Calmidae Iredale & O'Donoghue, 1923
  - Family Cuthonellidae Miller, 1971
  - Family Cuthonidae Odhner, 1934
  - Family Eubranchidae Odhner, 1934
  - Family Fionidae Gray, 1857
  - Family Pseudovermidae Thiele, 1931
  - Family Tergipedidae Bergh, 1889
  - Family Trinchesiidae F. Nordsieck, 1972
- Superfamily Aeolidioidea (= Cleioprocta) Gray, 1827
  - Family Aeolidiidae Gray, 1827
  - Family Facelinidae Bergh, 1889
  - Family Glaucidae Gray, 1827
  - Family Piseinotecidae Edmunds, 1970
  - Family Pleurolidiidae Burn, 1966
  - Family Unidentiidae Millen & Hermosillo, 2012
