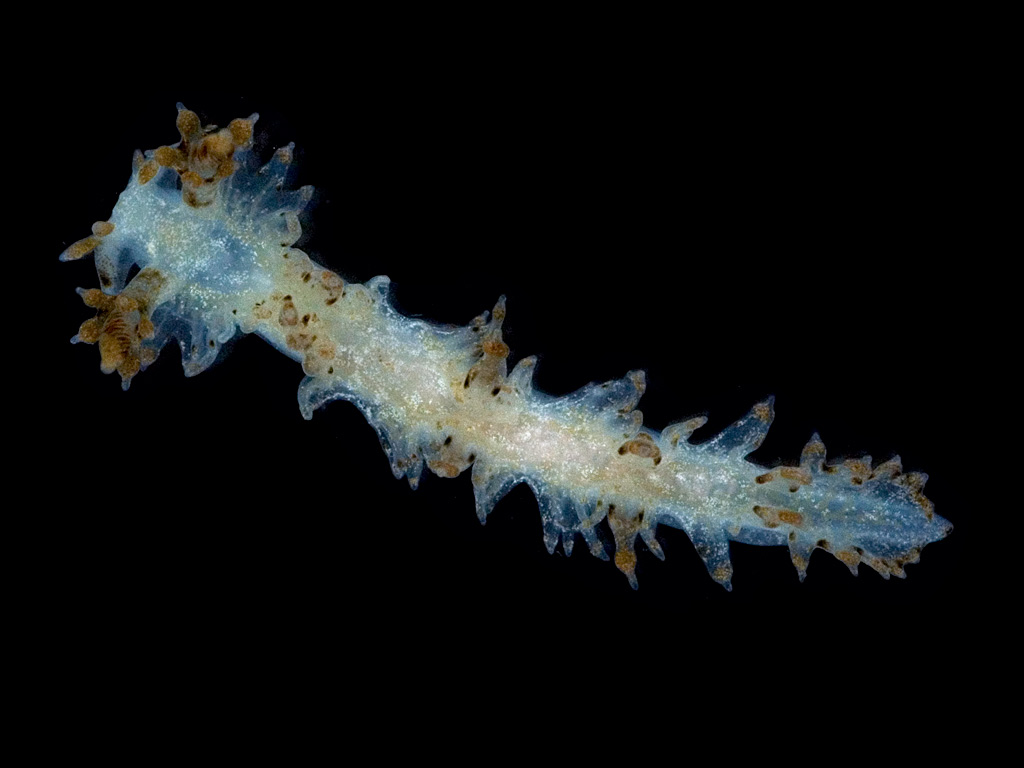
- The nudibranch Lomanotus marmoratus, Skerries, Portrush, Northern Ireland.

Scientific classification
- Kingdom: Animalia
- Phylum: Mollusca
- Class: Gastropoda
- Order: Nudibranchia
- Suborder: Tritoniacea
- Family: Tritoniidae
- Genus: Lomanotus
- Species: L. marmoratus

Binomial name
- Lomanotus marmoratus (Alder & Hancock, 1845)

Synonyms
- Eumenis marmorata Alder & Hancock, 1845

= Lomanotus marmoratus =

Species of gastropod

Lomanotus marmoratus is a species of a sea slug, a marine gastropod mollusc in the family Lomanotidae.

== Distribution ==
This species was described from Berry Head, Torbay on the south coast of England. It has been reported from Atlantic coasts from Great Britain to Spain to Great Britain and also from the Mediterranean Sea.

== Ecology ==
Lomanotus marmoratus feeds on the hydroid Nemertesia antennina family Plumulariidae.
