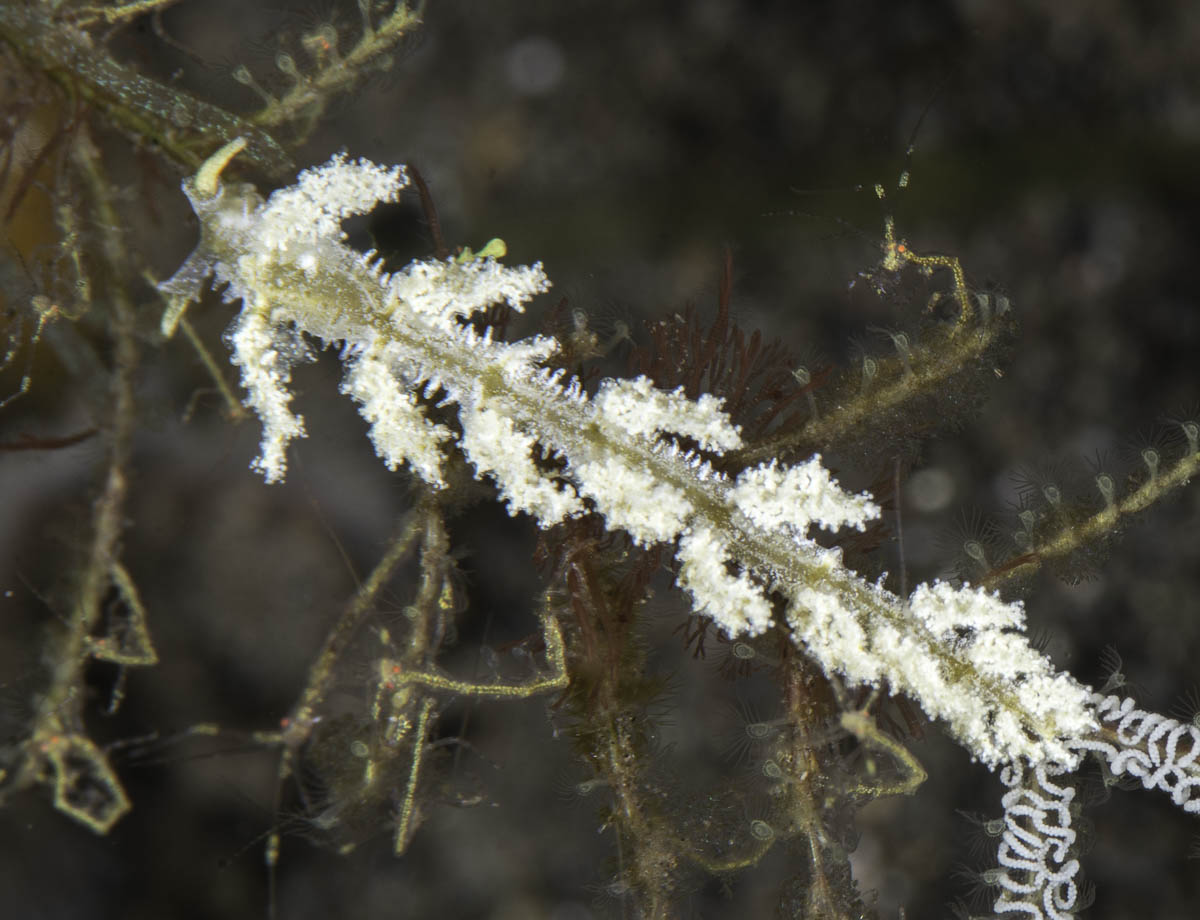
- The nudibranch Kabeiro phasmida, Bontoh, Pulau Sangeang, Indonesia.

Scientific classification
- Kingdom: Animalia
- Phylum: Mollusca
- Class: Gastropoda
- Order: Nudibranchia
- Suborder: Dendronotacea
- Family: Dotidae
- Genus: Kabeiro
- Species: K. phasmida

Binomial name
- Kabeiro phasmida Shipman & Gosliner, 2015

= Kabeiro phasmida =

Species of gastropod

Kabeiro phasmida is a species of sea slug, a dendronotid nudibranch, a marine gastropod mollusc in the family Dotidae.

== Distribution ==
This species was described from Mainit Point, Calumpan Peninsula, Batangas Province, Luzon, Philippines. It has been photographed in Indonesia.

== Description ==
The body of this dendronotid nudibranch is light brown. The cerata are irregular in shape and there are raised tubercles on the sides of the body. The maximum length of this species is 20 mm.

== Ecology ==
Kabeiro phasmida is found on colonies of a pinnate hydroid.
