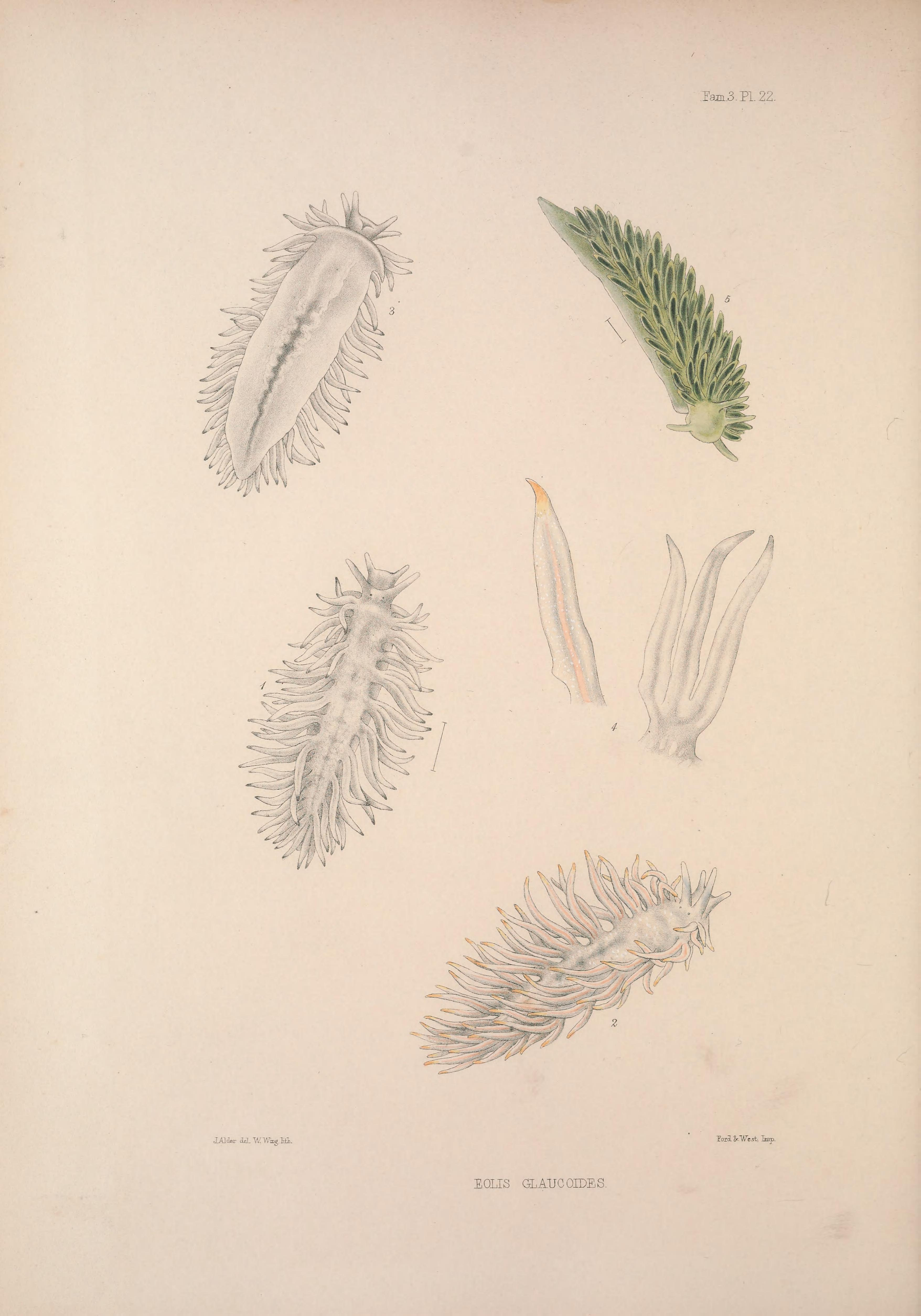

Scientific classification
- Kingdom: Animalia
- Phylum: Mollusca
- Class: Gastropoda
- Order: Nudibranchia
- Suborder: Aeolidacea
- Family: Calmidae
- Genus: Calma
- Species: C. glaucoides

Binomial name
- Calma glaucoides (Alder & Hancock, 1854)

Synonyms
- Eolis albicans Friele & Hansen, 1876; Eolis glaucoides Alder & Hancock, 1854; Forestia mirabilis Trinchese, 1881

= Calma glaucoides =

Species of gastropod

Calma glaucoides is a species of marine nudibranch in the family Calmidae. The holotype was described by Alder & Hancock in 1854 from Herm in the Channel Islands, but the nudibranch has since been detected in other parts of the British Isles. It was originally given the name Eolis glaucoides but has since been transferred to the genus Calma. It is an egg predator, feeding on the eggs of fish and cephalopods.

== Description ==
Calma glaucoides grows to a length of about 12 mm (0.5 in). The body is white and translucent; the head is small, the oral tentacles are small and smooth, and the branchial process is almost linear, being white fringed with yellow. The central part of the body is depressed and the central gland is a brownish colour. The cerata are arranged in eleven clusters, each sharing a common pedicle.

== Distribution and habitat ==
Native to the northeastern Atlantic Ocean, C. glaucoides is found on the coasts of the British Isles, the Channel Islands, France and Spain. It occurs in the littoral zone on rocky coasts, under stones and boulders, and often in association with hydroids.

== Ecology ==
Nudibranchs are hermaphrodite, and two individuals mate and transfer spermatophores to each other. The eggs are laid in a ribbon-like gelatinous coil and attached to the substrate. All nudibranchs are carnivorous, and Calma glaucoides specifically is an egg predator. Its small size and creamy white colour provides camouflage while it is feeding on the pale-coloured eggs of teleost fish and cephalopods. Examination of the gut contents shows that this species sometimes consumes its own juveniles. So rich and nourishing is its diet that the gut does not have an anal opening, presumably because the food produces so little residue; however, the larval stage does have an anus.
