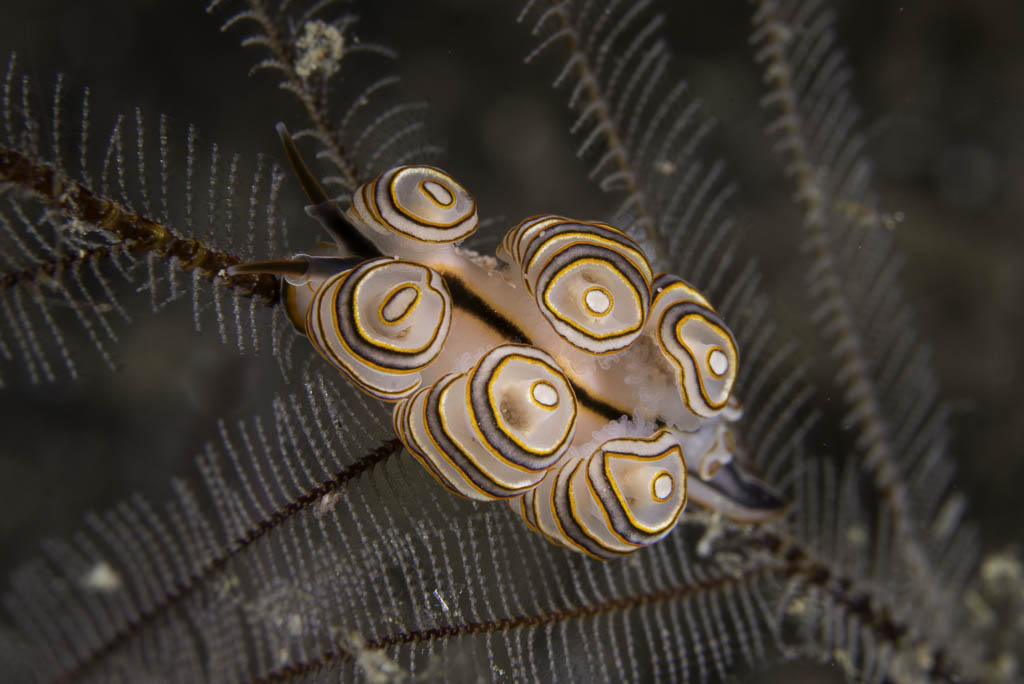
- The nudibranch Doto greenamyeri, Pulau Sangeang, Indonesia.

Scientific classification
- Kingdom: Animalia
- Phylum: Mollusca
- Class: Gastropoda
- Order: Nudibranchia
- Suborder: Dendronotacea
- Family: Dotidae
- Genus: Doto
- Species: D. greenamyeri

Binomial name
- Doto greenamyeri Shipman & Gosliner, 2015

= Doto greenamyeri =

Species of gastropod

Doto greenamyeri, also known as Doughnut Doto is a species of sea slug, a nudibranch, a marine gastropod mollusc in the family Dotidae.

== Distribution ==
This species was described from 20 m depth at Samarai Island in Kwato Channel, Milne Bay Province, Papua New Guinea. It is also known from Indonesia.

== Description ==
The body of this nudibranch is translucent white with pink ovotestis visible in mature individuals. There is a longitudinal stripe of brown pigment along the midline of the back which bifurcates on the head and leads to the brown rhinophores. The cerata are distinctive in shape, without tubercles but with a series of raised rings on their outer faces. They have bushy white pseudobranchs on the inner faces and the raised rings have brown lines at their apices, edged by orange. The maximum length of this species is 15 mm.

== Ecology ==
Doto greenamyeri is found on colonies of an aglaopheniid hydroid.
