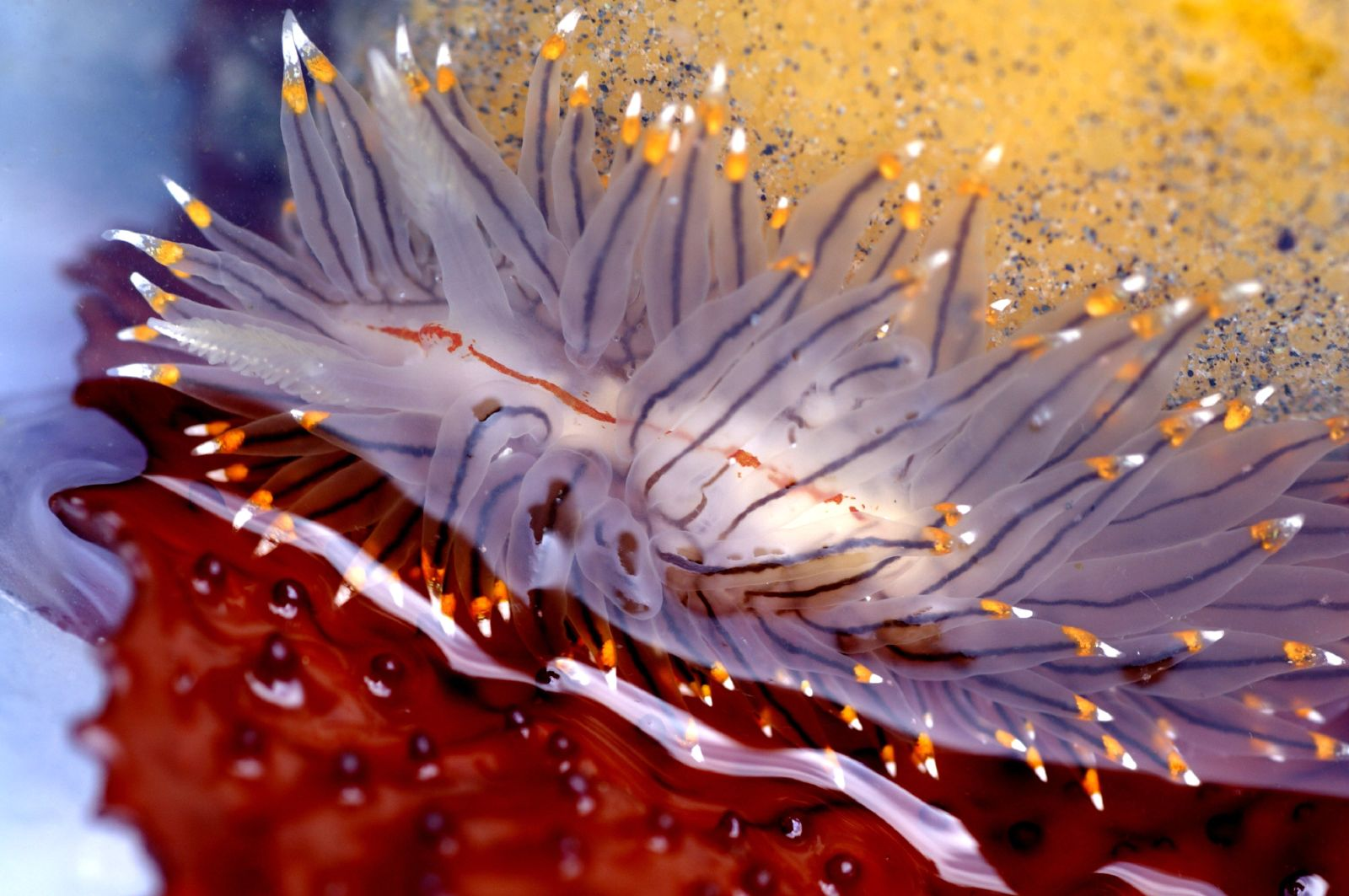

Scientific classification
- Kingdom: Animalia
- Phylum: Mollusca
- Class: Gastropoda
- Order: Nudibranchia
- Suborder: Cladobranchia
- Family: Janolidae
- Genus: Janolus
- Species: J. fuscus

Binomial name
- Janolus fuscus O'Donoghue, 1924

= Janolus fuscus =

Species of gastropod

Janolus fuscus is a species of sea slug, or more accurately a nudibranch, a marine gastropod mollusc in the family Janolidae.

== Distribution ==
The species Janolus fuscus is found from the Kenai Peninsula, Alaska to central California and also in northern Japan.

== Habitat ==
This species of nudibranch is found in intertidal and subtidal zones. These areas are shallow and rocky, and Janolus fuscus do not inhabit spaces deeper than 30m.

== Description ==
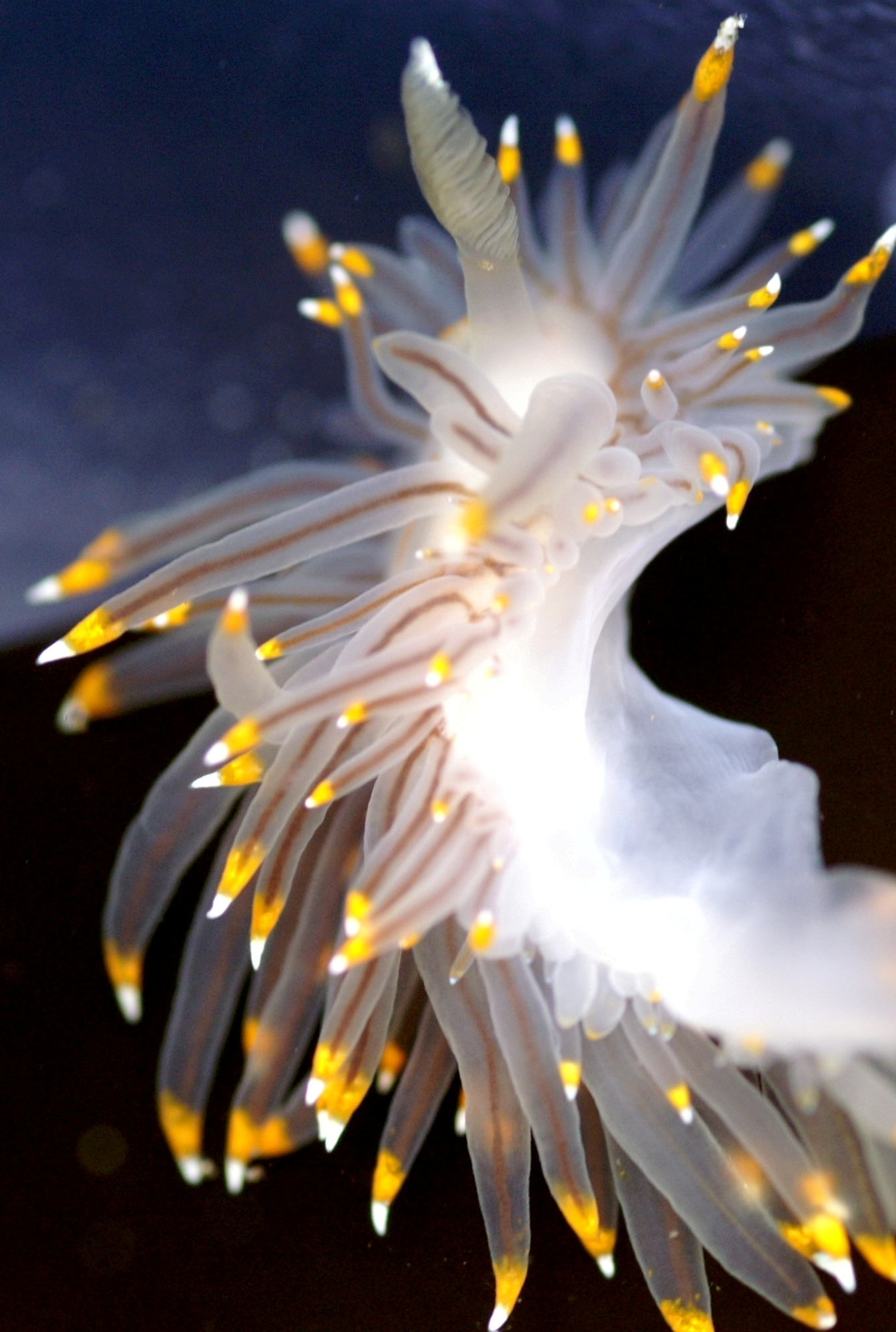
Janolus fuscus, head end towards the top

The bodies of nudibranchs in this species are semi-translucent and whitish-grey, and reach lengths of about 35mm. The body is covered in short cerata with brown cores, and the exterior fades to orange and then white at the tip. Its rhinophores have around 20 lamellae and are also white tipped. The cerata in front of the rhinophores (as well on the standard back of them) are a distinguishing factor between it and other nudibranch species' that are similar in appearance.

== Life habits ==
Janolus species feed on Bryozoa, specifically Bugula californica and Tricellaria. The fuscus species live for approximately five months.

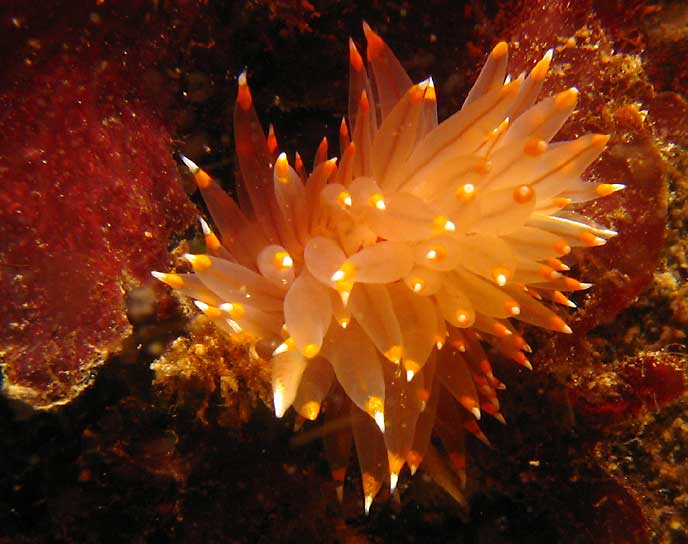
Janolus fuscus

== Predators ==
In California, Navanax is a known predator of Janolus. Navanax tracks the slime of Janolus by using chemoreceptors. When Janolus is about to be caught, it rolls into a ball, leaving its cerata exposed. If there is a water current, as if often the case, the sea slug may then be passively rolled away from the predator.

== Parasitic threats ==
Janolus fuscus can be infected with a parasitic crustacean called Ismaila belciki. This is fairly common, and in some monitored populations of the nudibranchs such as Coos Bay, Oregon's, the rate of infection is up to 80%. When I. belciki is present in this species, it is covertly located inside the body cavity so the only portion that can be seen from the outside are egg sacs. The parasite does not interfere with the growth of its host, but it poaches off the sea slug for many functions including taking the nudibranch's resources that it uses for egg production to use for I. belciki's own egg production, making reproduction slow for the host and the survival rate lower as a whole.
