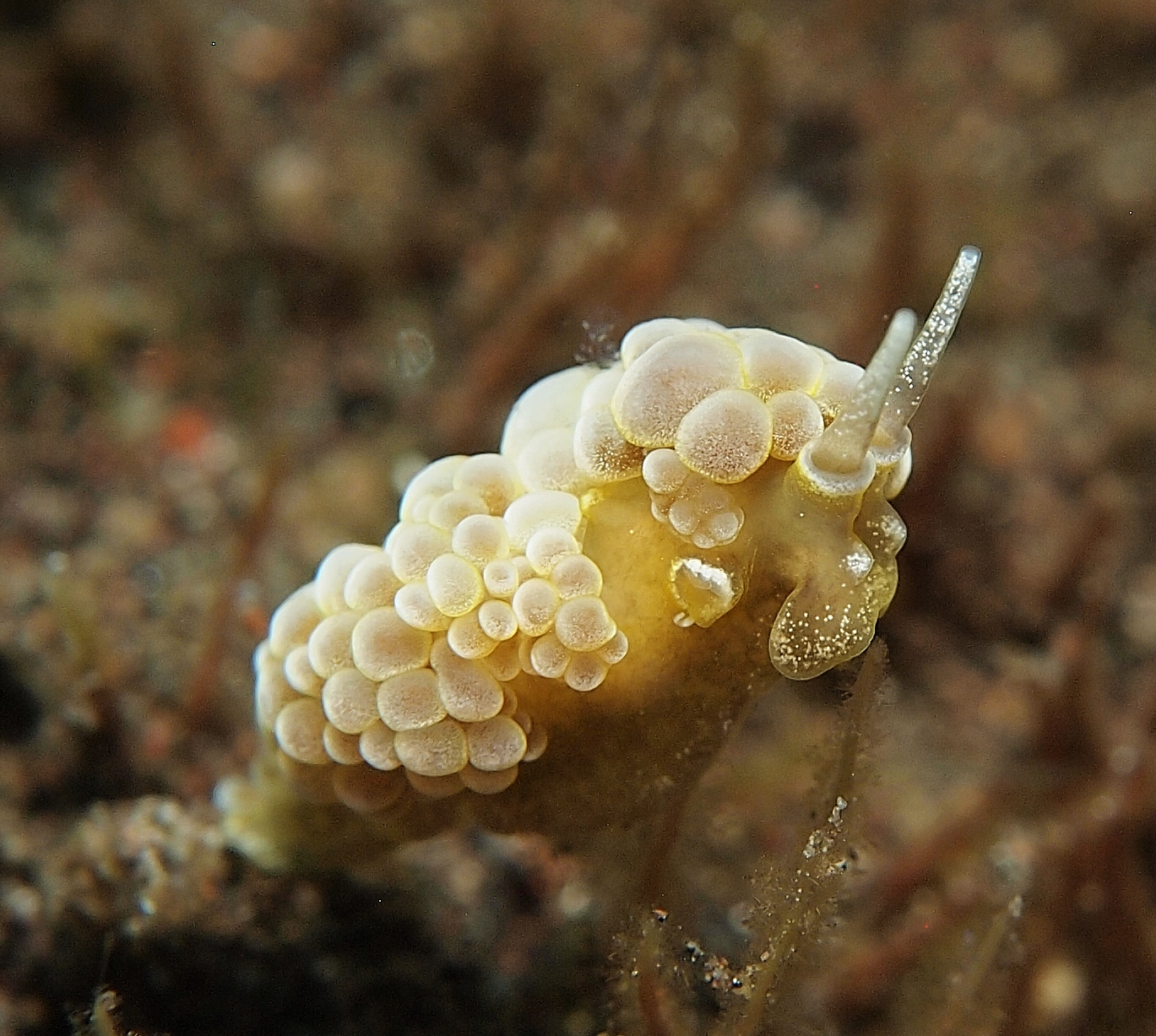

Scientific classification
- Kingdom: Animalia
- Phylum: Mollusca
- Class: Gastropoda
- Order: Nudibranchia
- Suborder: Dendronotacea
- Family: Dotidae
- Genus: Doto
- Species: D. ussi

Binomial name
- Doto ussi Ortea, 1982

= Doto ussi =

Species of gastropod

Doto ussi is a species of sea slug, a nudibranch, a marine gastropod mollusc in the family Dotidae.

== Distribution ==
This species was described from the Comoros Islands, in the Indian Ocean. It has subsequently been reported from the Philippines and Indonesia.

== Description ==
This nudibranch is mostly uniform yellow to pale olive-brown in colour. The ceratal tubercles are large and globular and completely obscure the back when the animal is at rest.

== Ecology ==
Doto ussi is found on colonies of the stinging hydroid, Aglaophenia cupressina (family Aglaopheniidae), on which it presumably feeds. Many other species of Doto also feed on hydroids of the family Aglaopheniidae and the other families in the superfamily Plumularioidea.
