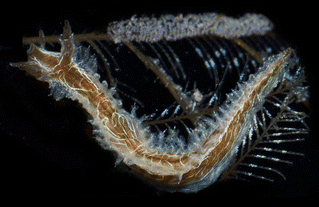
- Lomanotus vermiformis on substrate with egg mass.

Scientific classification
- Kingdom: Animalia
- Phylum: Mollusca
- Class: Gastropoda
- Order: Nudibranchia
- Suborder: Tritoniacea
- Family: Tritoniidae
- Genus: Lomanotus
- Species: L. vermiformis

Binomial name
- Lomanotus vermiformis Eliot, 1908

Synonyms
- Lomanotus stauberi Clark & Goetzfried, 1976

= Lomanotus vermiformis =

Species of gastropod

Lomanotus vermiformis is a species of sea slug, a marine gastropod mollusk in the family Lomanotidae.

== Taxonomy ==
This species was synonymised with the Caribbean species Lomanotus stauberi in 1988.

The specific name vermiformis is from Latin language and it means "in the shape of a worm" referring to elongate body of this species.

== Distribution ==
The distribution of Lomanotus vermiformis is circumtropical. This species was described from the Red Sea. It has also been reported widely from tropical seas in the Indo-Pacific region. Records from the Western Atlantic includes Florida, Bahamas and Panama.

== Description ==
The body shape is very elongate and narrow. Rhinophoral sheaths are with papillae and they are elevated to cover three quarters of the rhinophores. Cerata are very short and pointed. Background color is brown with dark brown spots and opaque yellow lines. Opaque white reticulations is also present across the body. The maximum recorded body length is 40 mm, but it is usually smaller than 25 mm.

== Ecology ==
Minimum recorded depth is 1 m. Maximum recorded depth is 4.5 m.

Lomanotus vermiformis feeds on the common stinging hydroid Lytocarpus philippinus and on hydroids of the genus Macrorhynchia. It was also found feeding on an unidentified species of hydroid in Panama, on which it is extremely cryptic.

Lomanotus vermiformis can swim with lateral flexions of the body when disturbed.
