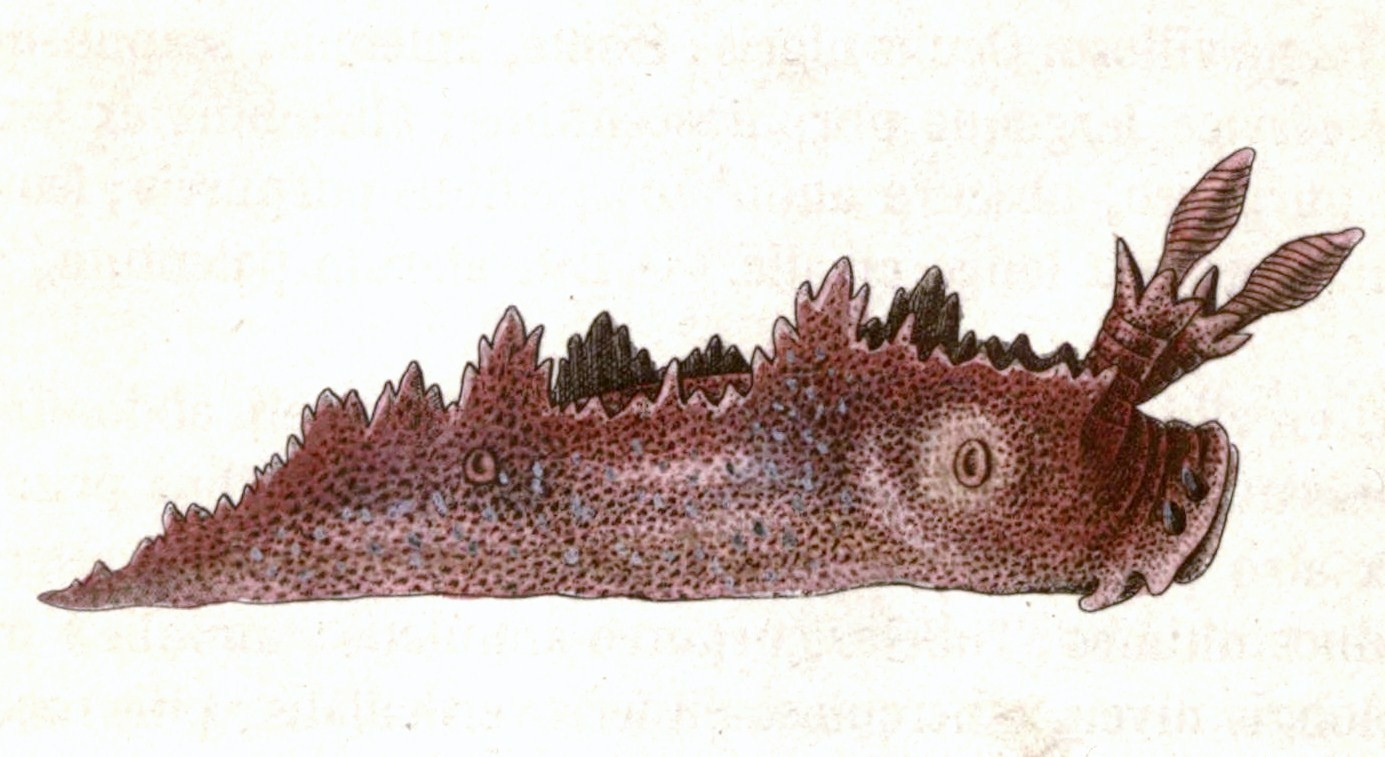
- Drawing of a right side view of Lomanotus genei

Scientific classification
- Kingdom: Animalia
- Phylum: Mollusca
- Class: Gastropoda
- Order: Nudibranchia
- Suborder: Tritoniacea
- Family: Tritoniidae
- Genus: Lomanotus
- Species: L. genei

Binomial name
- Lomanotus genei Vérany, 1846

Synonyms
- Lomanotus portlandicus W. Thompson, 1859; Lomanotus hancocki Norman, 1877; Lomanotus eisigi Trinchese, 1883; Lomanotus varians Garstang, 1889 (partim); Lomanotus berghi Graeffe, 1902

= Lomanotus genei =

Species of gastropod

Lomanotus genei is a species of a sea slug, a marine gastropod mollusk in the family Lomanotidae.

== Distribution ==
This species was described from Genoa in the Adriatic Sea. It has been reported from Atlantic coasts north to the United Kingdom.

== Ecology ==
Parasites of Lomanotus genei include:

- Copepod Lomanoticola insolens - ectoparasite
