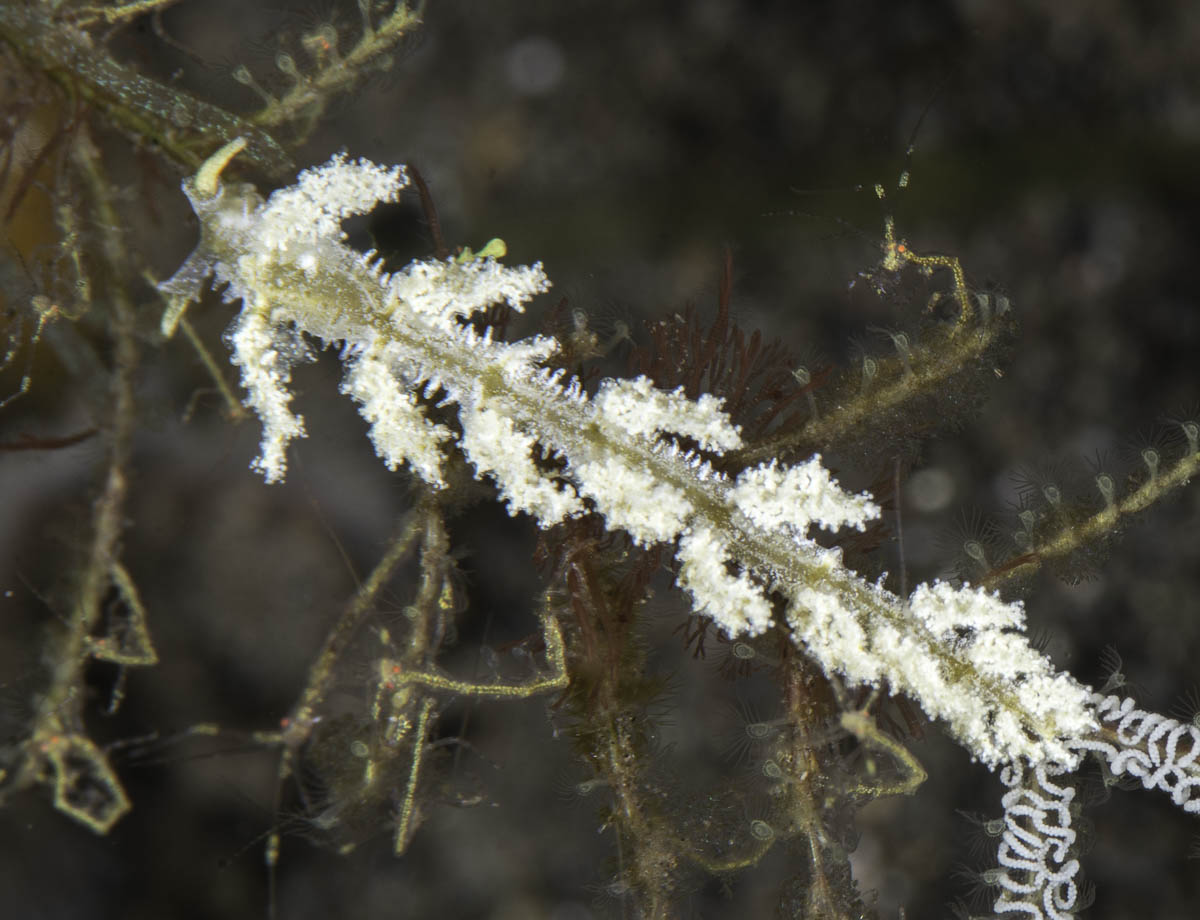
- Kabeiro phasmida

Scientific classification
- Kingdom: Animalia
- Phylum: Mollusca
- Class: Gastropoda
- Order: Nudibranchia
- Suborder: Dendronotacea
- Family: Dotidae
- Genus: Kabeiro; Shipman & Gosliner, 2015

Type species
- Kabeiro rubroreticulata Shipman & Gosliner, 2015

Species
- See text

= Kabeiro =

Genus of gastropods

Kabeiro is a genus of dendronotid nudibranch in the family Dotidae.

== Species ==
Species within the genus Kabeiro include:

- Kabeiro christianae Shipman & Gosliner, 2015
- Kabeiro phasmida Shipman & Gosliner, 2015
- Kabeiro rubroreticulata Shipman & Gosliner, 2015
