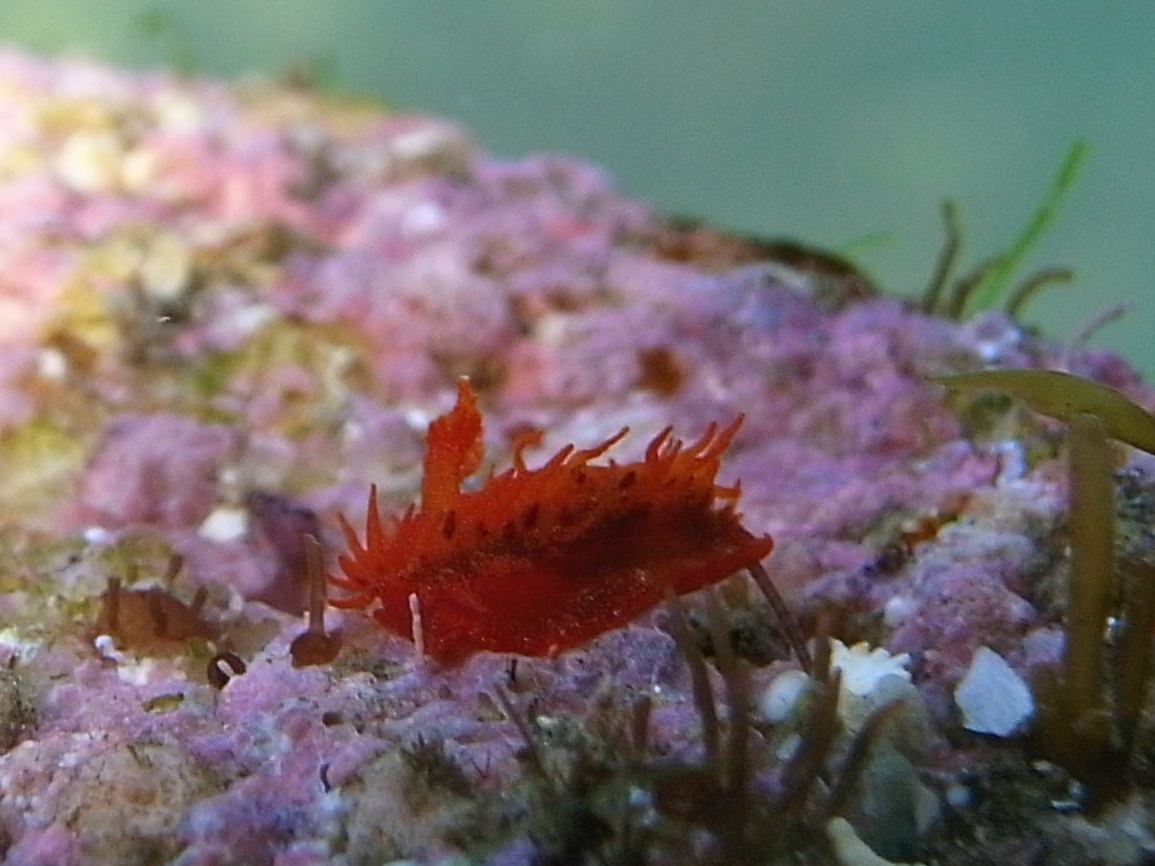
- Madrella sanguinea

Scientific classification
- Kingdom: Animalia
- Phylum: Mollusca
- Class: Gastropoda
- Order: Nudibranchia
- Suborder: Cladobranchia
- Superfamily: Proctonotoidea
- Family: Madrellidae; Preston, 1911

Genera
- See text

= Madrellidae =

Family of gastropods

Madrellidae is a family of nudibranchs, marine gastropod molluscs, in the clade Nudipleura. There are no subfamilies in Madrellidae.

== Genera ==
Genera and species within the family Madrellidae include:

- Madrella
  - Madrella aurantiaca Vayssière, 1902
  - Madrella ferruginosa Alder & Hancock, 1864
  - Madrella gloriosa Baba, 1949
  - Madrella sanguinea (Angas, 1864)
- Eliotia
  - Eliotia souleyeti Vayssière, 1909
