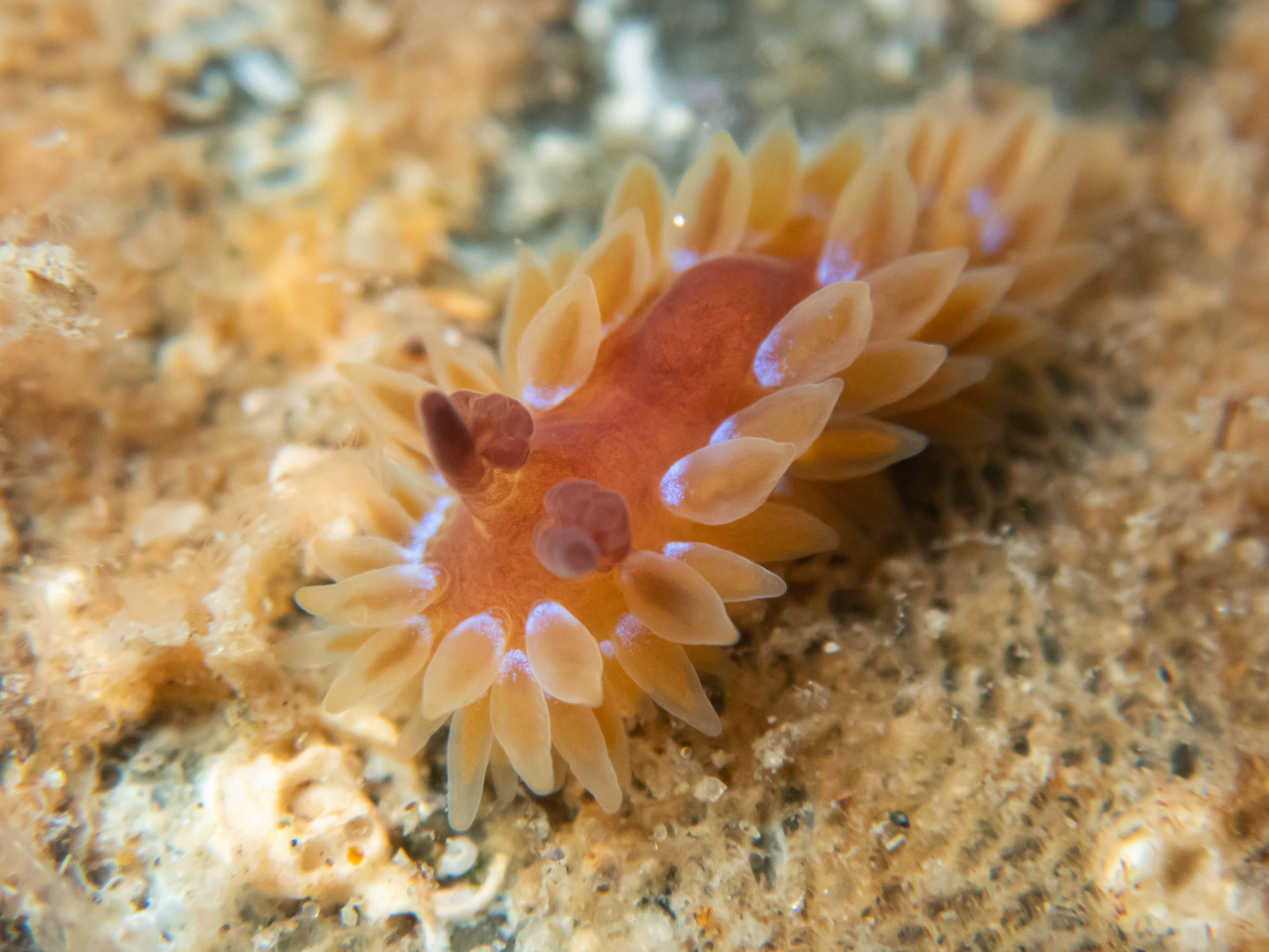
- Caldukia rubiginosa, Hen & Chicken Islands, Northland, New Zealand, photo by Ian Skipworth

Scientific classification
- Kingdom: Animalia
- Phylum: Mollusca
- Class: Gastropoda
- Order: Nudibranchia
- Suborder: Cladobranchia
- Superfamily: Proctonotoidea
- Family: Proctonotidae; Gray, 1853

Genera
- See text

Synonyms
- Veniliidae Chenu, 1859 (inv.); Zephyrinidae Iredale & O'Donoghue, 1923

= Proctonotidae =

Family of gastropods

Proctonotidae is a family of sea slugs, nudibranchs, marine gastropod molluscs, in the clade Euthyneura.

== Genera ==
Genera in the family Proctonotidae include:

- Caldukia Burn and Miller, 1969
- Proctonotus Alder, 1844

Genera brought into synonymy

- Venilia Alder & Hancock, 1844: synonym of Proctonotua Alder & Hancock, 1844
- Zephyrina Quatrefages, 1844: synonym of Proctonotus Alder & Hancock, 1844
