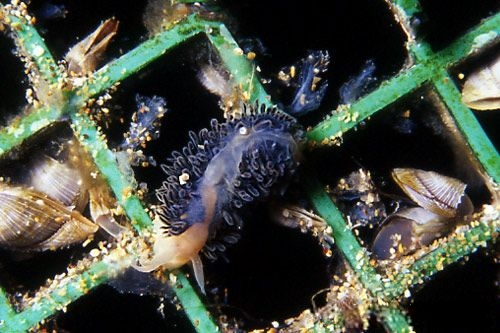

Scientific classification
- Missing taxonomy template ([{{fullurl:Template:taxonomy/Nudibranchia |action=edit&preload=Template:Taxonomy/sameas}} fix]): [[Nudibranchia
- Superordo: [[Aeolidina ]]
- Superfamily: Fionoidea; Gray, 1857

Families
- See Families

= Fionoidea =

Superfamily of gastropods

Fionoidea is a superfamily of nudibranchs, shell-less marine gastropod molluscs or sea slugs, in the suborder Aeolidacea. The families within Fionoidea were shown to be monophyletic on DNA evidence and a re-interpretation of family characteristics was provided.

== Families ==
In 2017, Bouchet and colleagues listed the following families inside Fionoidea:

- Family Calmidae Iredale & O’Donoghue, 1923
- Family Cuthonellidae M. C. Miller, 1977
- Family Cuthonidae Odhner, 1934
- Family Eubranchidae Odhner, 1934
- Family Fionidae Gray, 1857
- Family Lomanotidae Bergh, 1890
- Family Pinufiidae Er. Marcus & Ev. Marcus, 1960
- Family Tergipedidae Bergh, 1889
- Family Trinchesiidae F. Nordsieck, 1972

=== 2025 revision ===
A 2025 revision of the taxonomy of Aeolidacea by Korshunova and colleagues recognised, based on the results of molecular phylogenetic analysises, the following families in the superfamily Fionoidea:

- Family Abronicidae Korshunova, Martynov, Bakken, Evertsen, Fletcher, Mudianta, Saito, Lundin, Schrödl & Picton, 2017
- Family Calmidae Iredale & O'Donoghue, 1923
- Family Cuthonellidae Miller, 1971
- Family Cuthonidae Odhner, 1934
- Family Eubranchidae Odhner, 1934
- Family Fionidae Gray, 1857
- Family Murmaniidae Korshunova, Martynov, Bakken, Evertsen, Fletcher, Mudianta, Saito, Lundin, Schrödl & Picton, 2017
- Family Tergipedidae Bergh, 1889
- Family Trinchesiidae F. Nordsieck, 1972
- Family Xenocratenidae Martynov, Lundin, Picton, Fletcher, Malmber & Korshunova, 2020
