= Pinufiidae =

Scientific classification
- Kingdom: Animalia
- Phylum: Mollusca
- Class: Gastropoda
- Order: Nudibranchia
- Suborder: Aeolidacea
- Superfamily: Fionoidea
- Family: Pinufiidae; Er. Marcus & Ev. Marcus, 1960

Type genus
- Pinufius Er. Marcus & Ev. Marcus, 1960

Family of gastropods

Pinufiidae is a family of sea slugs, specifically nudibranchs, marine gastropod molluscs in the superfamily Fionoidea.

In Korshunova et al. (2025), Pinufiidae was not recognized as a family but as a subgroup or 'subfamily' of the family Trinchesiidae. This is due to the type genus Pinufius bearing close relations the trinchesiid Phestilla.
