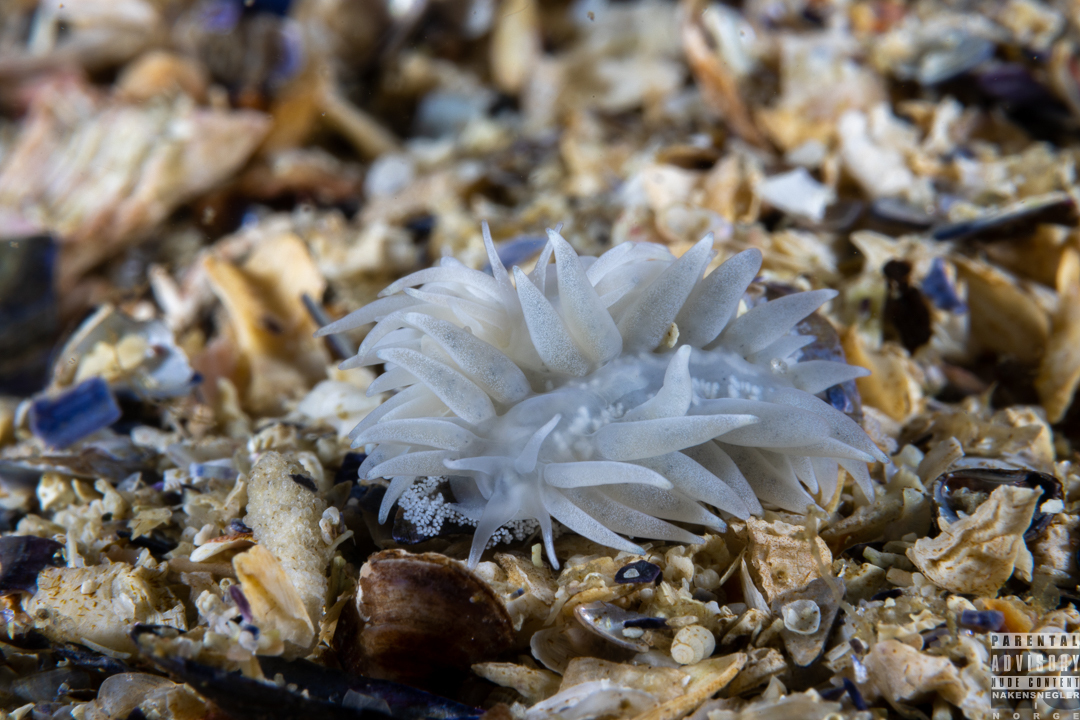
- Calma glaucoides

Scientific classification
- Kingdom: Animalia
- Phylum: Mollusca
- Class: Gastropoda
- Order: Nudibranchia
- Suborder: Aeolidacea
- Superfamily: Fionoidea
- Family: Calmidae; Iredale & O'Donoghue, 1923
- Genus: Calma; Alder & Hancock, 1855

Type species
- Calma glaucoides (Alder & Hancock, 1854)

Synonyms
- Forestia Trinchese, 1881

= Calma (gastropod) =

Genus of gastropods

Calma is a genus of nudibranchs, shell-less marine gastropod molluscs or sea slugs, and the only member of the family Calmidae. It is characterized by the lacks of an anus and radular teeth mostly fused into a band-like radular ribbon, a trait unique within a majority of the order Nudibranchia. These adaptations are largely a result of their diet of teleost eggs.

== Species ==
The genus contains two species:

- Species Calma glaucoides (Alder and Hancock, 1854)
- Species Calma gobioophaga Calado and Urgorri, 2002

== Taxonomic history ==
In 2016, a molecular phylogenetics study by Cella and colleagues placed various fionoid taxa in the family Fionidae, among them Calma. In 2017, Korshunova and colleagues found this "super-lumping" of taxa inside the family Fionidae, as “Fionidae” sensu latissimo, to contain fundamental errors in its list of synapomorphies and to not provide a reliable morphological delineation or definition of the taxa it contained. The latter authors argue that various taxa lumped into this family presented considerable morphological and molecular pattern differences from each other, such as the unique radula of Calma, and that such differences should grant the usage of more narrowly-defined families, reinstating, among other families, the family Calmidae.

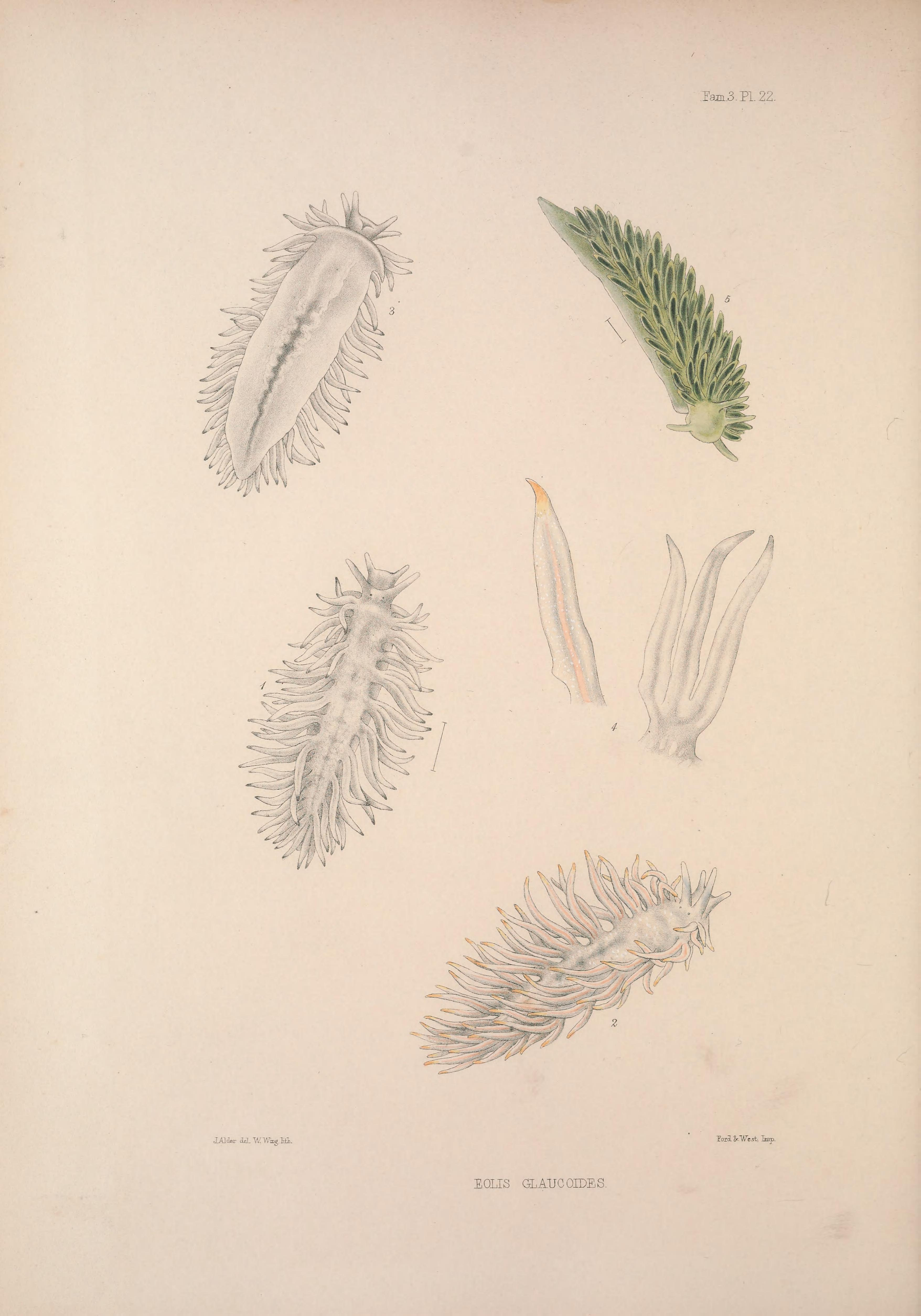
Illustration of Calma glaucoides

== See also ==
- Gofas, S.; Le Renard, J.; Bouchet, P. (2001). Mollusca. in: Costello, M.J. et al. (Ed.) (2001). European register of marine species: a check-list of the marine species in Europe and a bibliography of guides to their identification. Collection Patrimoines Naturels. 50: pp. 180–213.
- Bouchet, P.; Rocroi, J.-P. (2005). "Classification and Nomenclator of Gastropod Families". Malacologia. 47 (1–2).
- Animal Diversity - University of Michigan
- Vaught, K.C. (1989). A classification of the living Mollusca. American Malacologists: Melbourne, FL (USA). ISBN 0-915826-22-4. XII, 195 pp.
- Marine species database
- Proc. malac. Soc. London 15: 200
