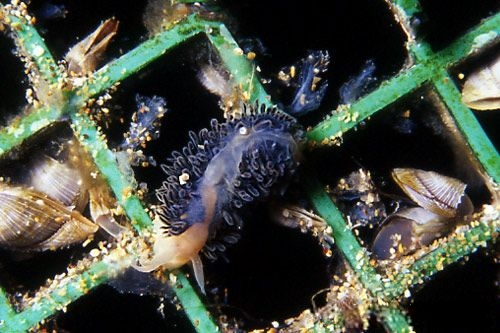

Scientific classification
- Kingdom: Animalia
- Phylum: Mollusca
- Class: Gastropoda
- Order: Nudibranchia
- Suborder: Aeolidacea
- Superfamily: Fionoidea
- Family: Fionidae; Gray, 1857

Genera
- See text

= Fionidae =

Family of gastropods

Fionidae is a family of sea slugs, aeolid nudibranchs, marine gastropod molluscs in the superfamily Fionoidea.

== General characteristics ==
The animal bears four simple tentacles and numerous papillose branchiae. The vent is situated latero-dorsally. The mouth is equipped with jaws, and the lingual membrane bears a single series of plates.

== Taxonomic history ==
This family was expanded to include Tergipedidae, Eubranchidae and Calmidae as a result of a molecular phylogenetics study. This was reversed in 2017 with further DNA evidence and a re-interpretation of genus and family characteristics.

== Genera ==
According to Korshunova et al. (2025), genera within the family Fionidae include:

- Fiona Alder & Hancock [in Forbes & Hanley], 1853
- Tergiposacca Cella, Carmona, Ekimova, Chichvarkhin, Schepetov & Gosliner, 2016

Other genera not mentioned in Korshunova et al. (2025) include:

- Zatteria Eliot, 1902
