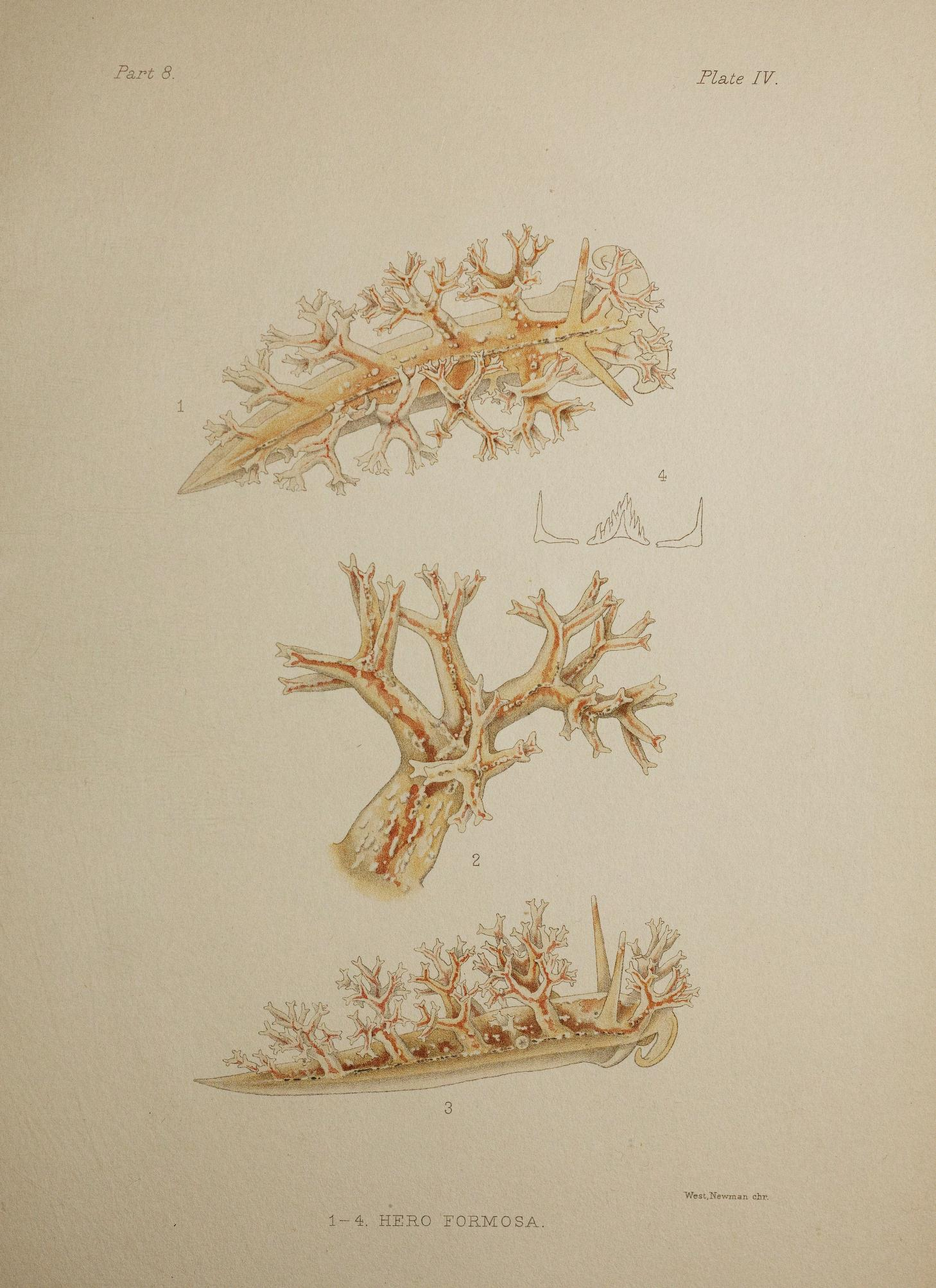
- Hero formosa depicted in A monograph of the British nudibranchiate Mollusca Part 8 Charles Eliot

Scientific classification
- Kingdom: Animalia
- Phylum: Mollusca
- Class: Gastropoda
- Order: Nudibranchia
- Suborder: incertae sedis
- Family: Heroidae; J. E. Gray, 1857
- Genus: Hero; Alder & Hancock, 1855

= Hero (gastropod) =

Genus of gastropods

Heroidae is a family of sea slugs, nudibranchs, marine gastropod molluscs in the clade Nudipleura. There are no subfamilies in Heroidae. Hero is the only genus in this monotypic family.

== Species ==
- Hero blanchardi (Vayssière, 1888)
- Hero formosa (Lovén, 1844)
