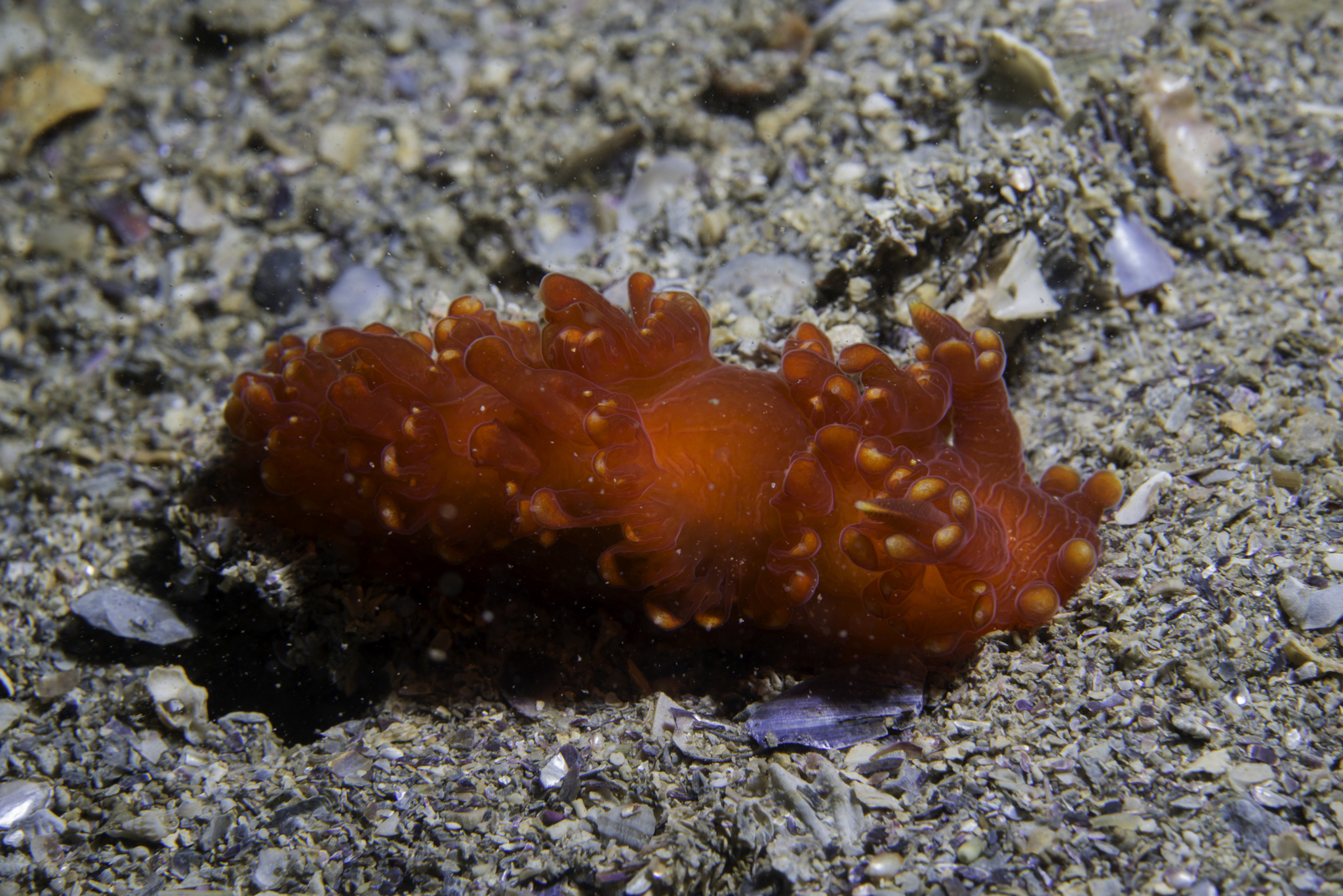
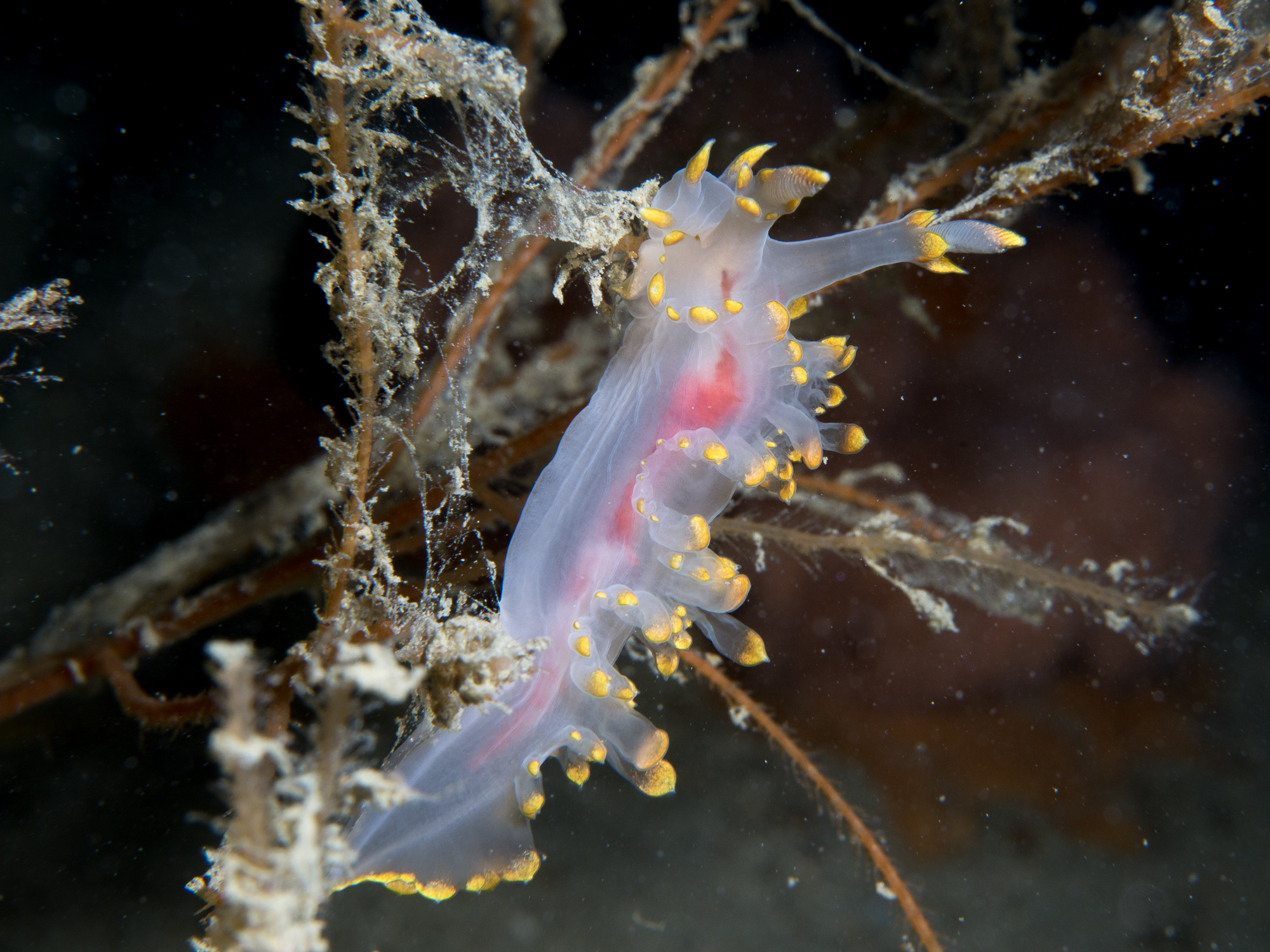
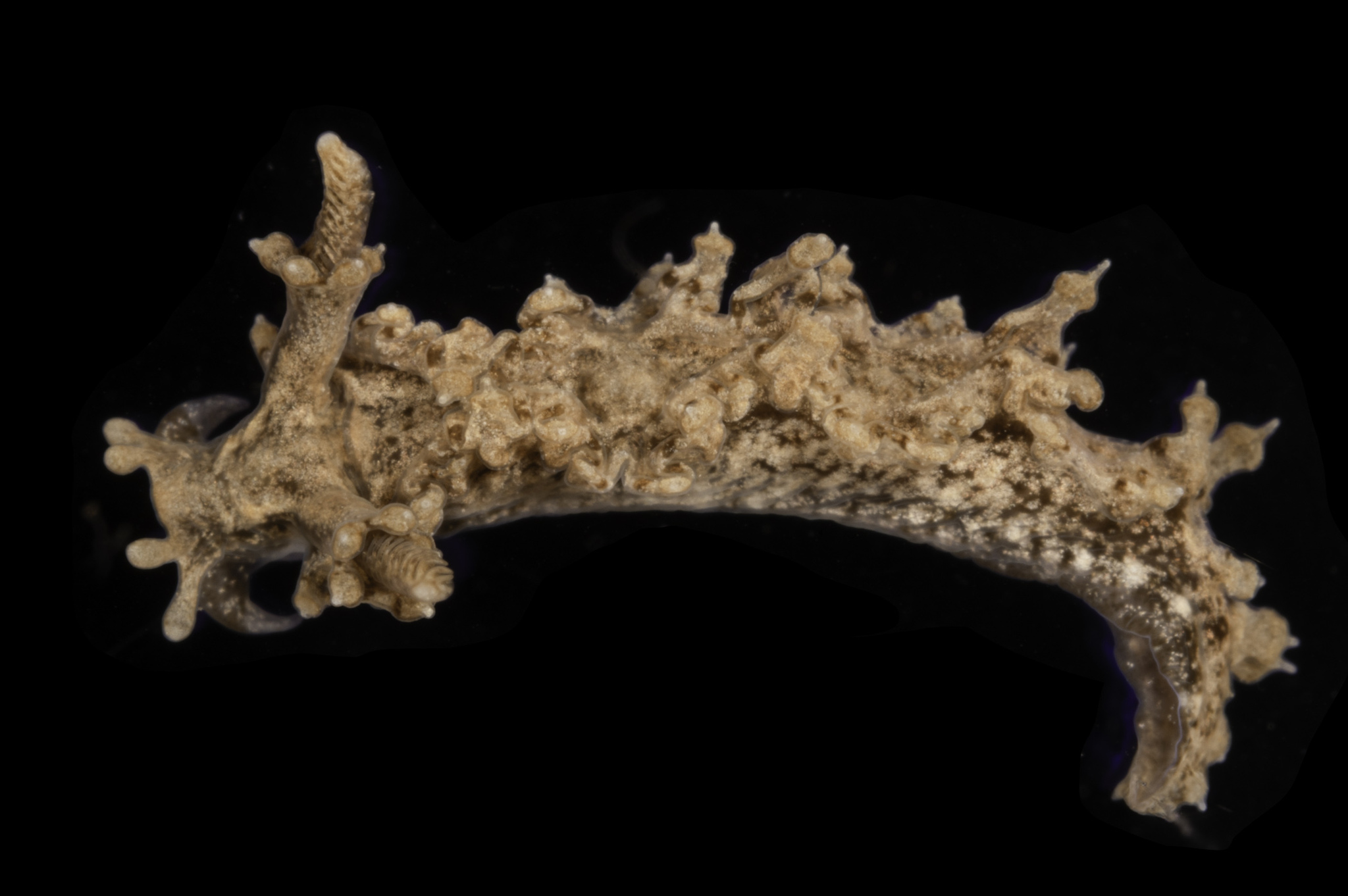
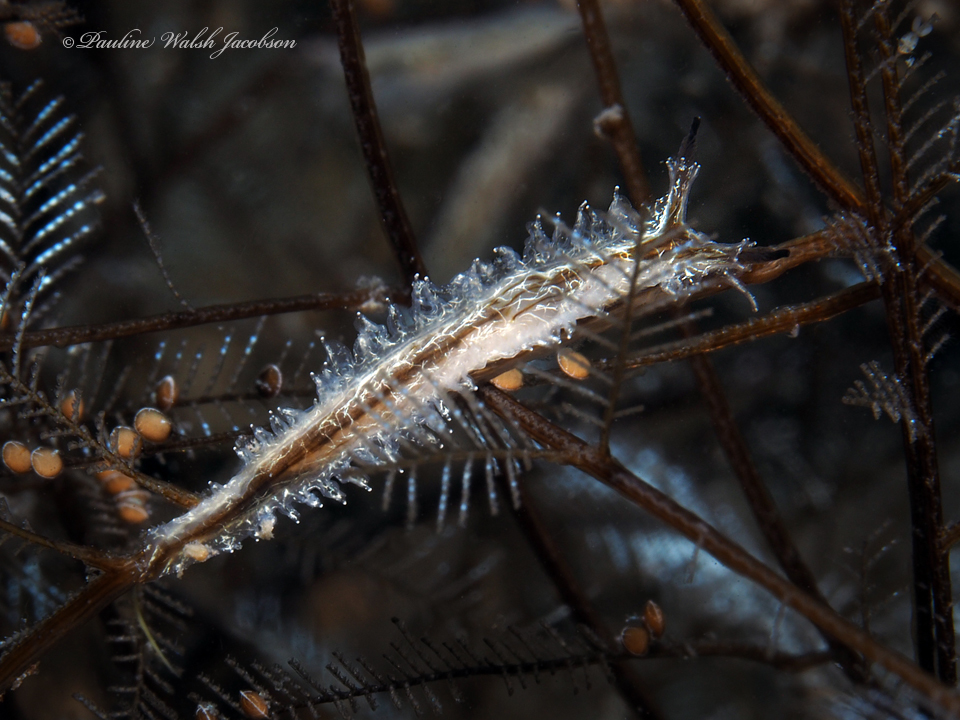
- Top row: Lomanotus genei Bottom row, from left to right: Lomanotus marmoratus, and Lomanotus vermiformis

Scientific classification
- Kingdom: Animalia
- Phylum: Mollusca
- Class: Gastropoda
- Order: Nudibranchia
- Suborder: Dendronotacea
- Superfamily: Dendronotoidea
- Family: Lomanotidae; Bergh, 1890

= Lomanotidae =

Family of gastropods

Lomanotidae is a family of nudibranchs, shell-less marine gastropod molluscs or sea slugs, in the superfamily Dendronotoidea.

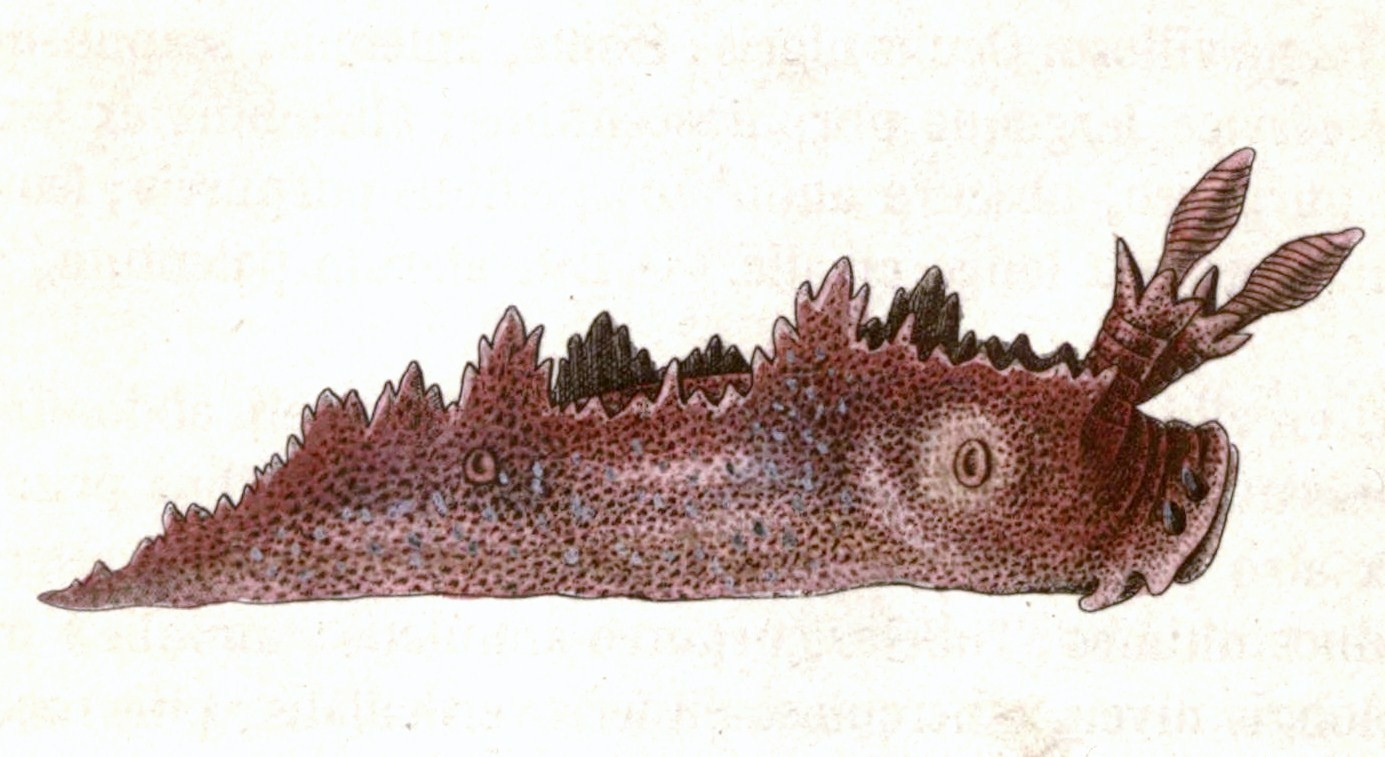
Illustration of Lomanotus genei

== Genera ==
The family Lomanotidae includes only one valid genus:

- Lomanotus Verany, 1844

== See also ==
- Thompson, T. E., & Brown, G.H., 1984. Biology of opisthobranch Molluscs. Vol. 2. Ray Society; London. 1-229, p.17
