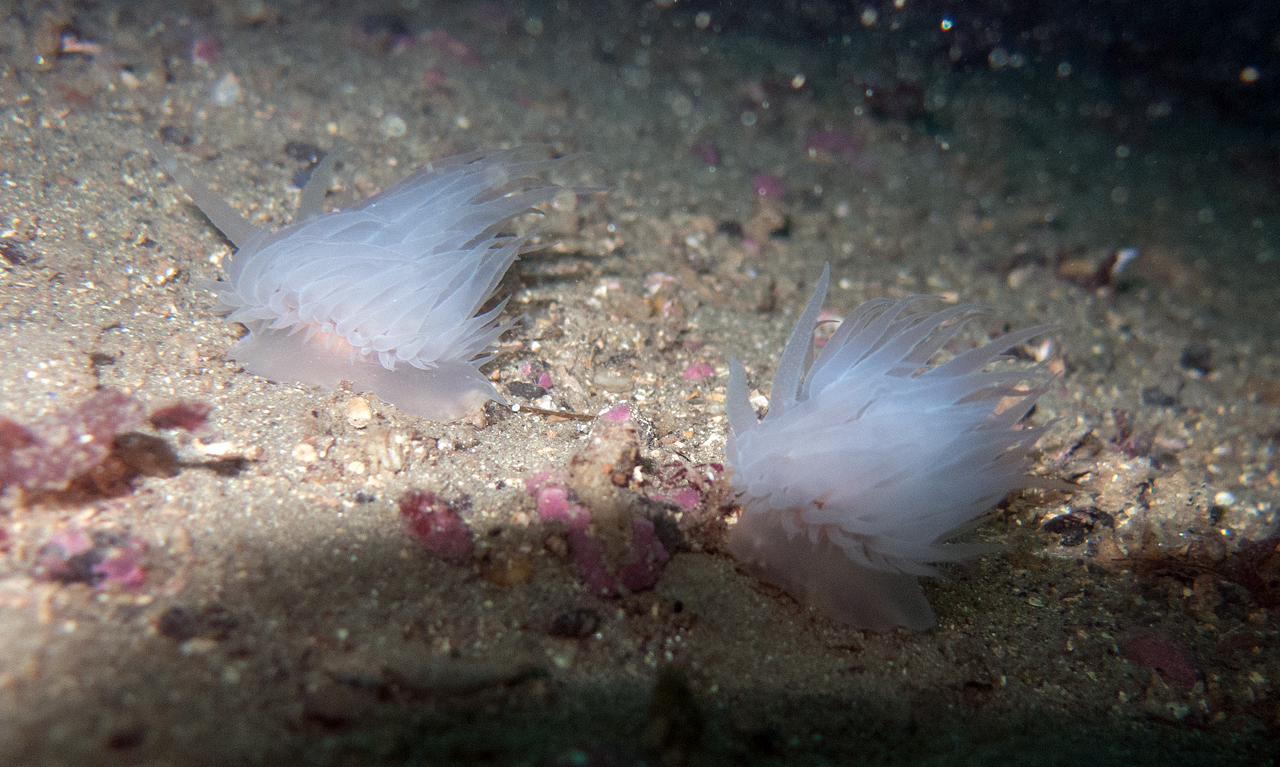
- Two individuals of Goniaeolis typica, Stokkvågen, Lurøy, Norway, 30 m

Scientific classification
- Kingdom: Animalia
- Phylum: Mollusca
- Class: Gastropoda
- Order: Nudibranchia
- Suborder: Janolacea
- Superfamily: Proctonotoidea (?)
- Family: Goniaeolididae; Odhner, 1907
- Genus: Goniaeolis; M. Sars, 1861
- Species: G. typica

Binomial name
- Goniaeolis typica M. Sars, 1861

Synonyms
- Family synonymy: Gonieolididae [misspelling]; Genus synonymy: Gonieolis M. Sars, 1861; Species synonymy: Goniaeolis intermedia Bergh, 1899; Goniaeolis lobata Odhner, 1939

= Goniaeolis =

Genus of gastropods

Goniaeolis is a monotypic genus of sea slug, a nudibranch, a marine gastropod mollusc in the family Goniaeolididae containing the single species Goniaeolis typica. Goniaeolis is also the only genus within the family Goniaeolididae.

Gonieolis is the original spelling, but incorrect subsequent spelling Goniaeolis is conserved under Art. 33.3.1 of the Code. The synonymy with Goniaeolis lobata was discussed in detail by Odhner in 1922.

== Distribution ==
It is endemic to Scandinavian waters. This species was described from Kristiansund, Norway. It has subsequently been reported from the Skagerrak, the Hardangerfjord, and at the mouth of the Trondheimsfjord. The species is known from 30 to 666 m.

== Description ==
External and internal anatomy was described by Nils Hjalmar Odhner in detail in 1922.
