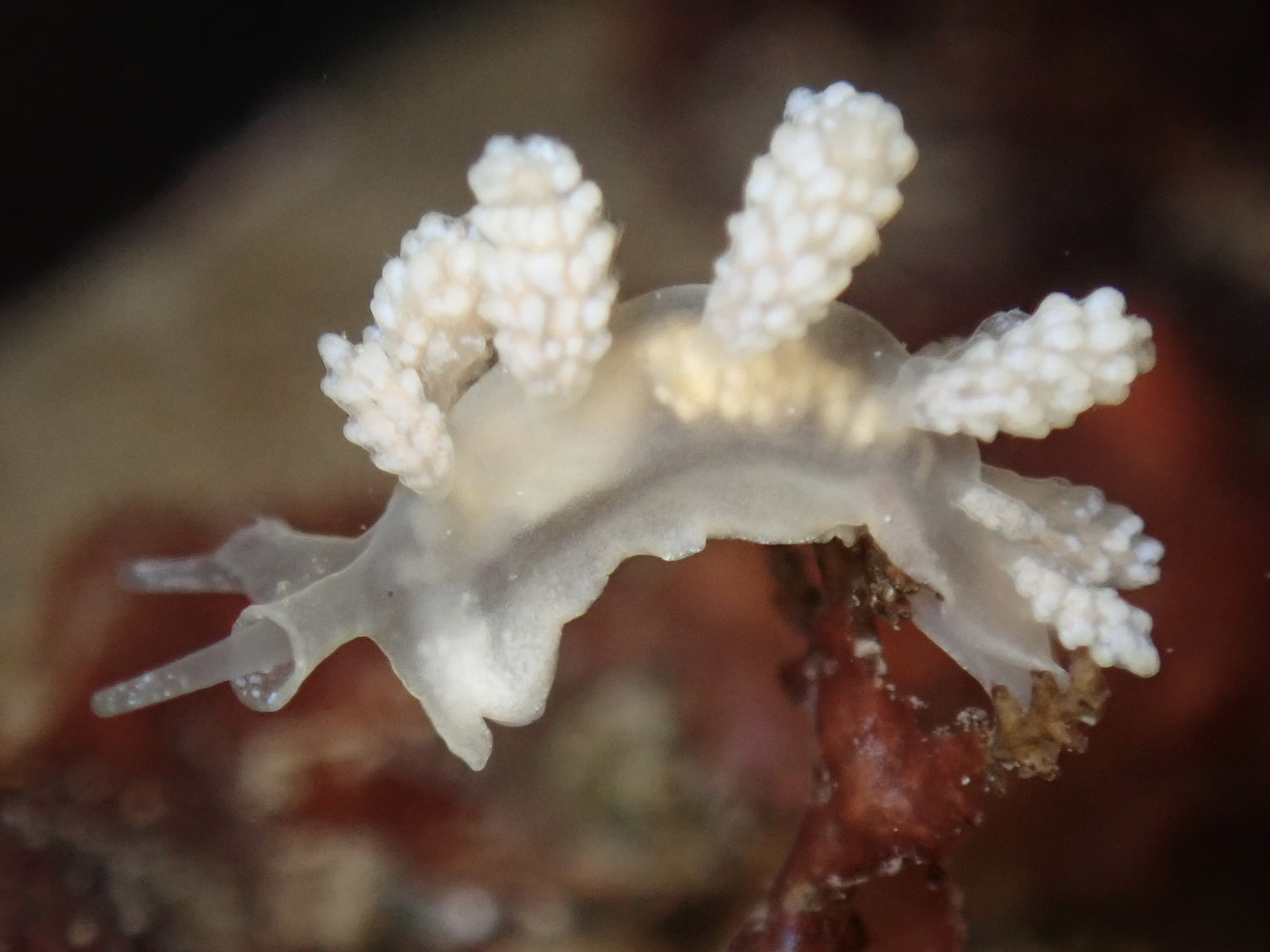
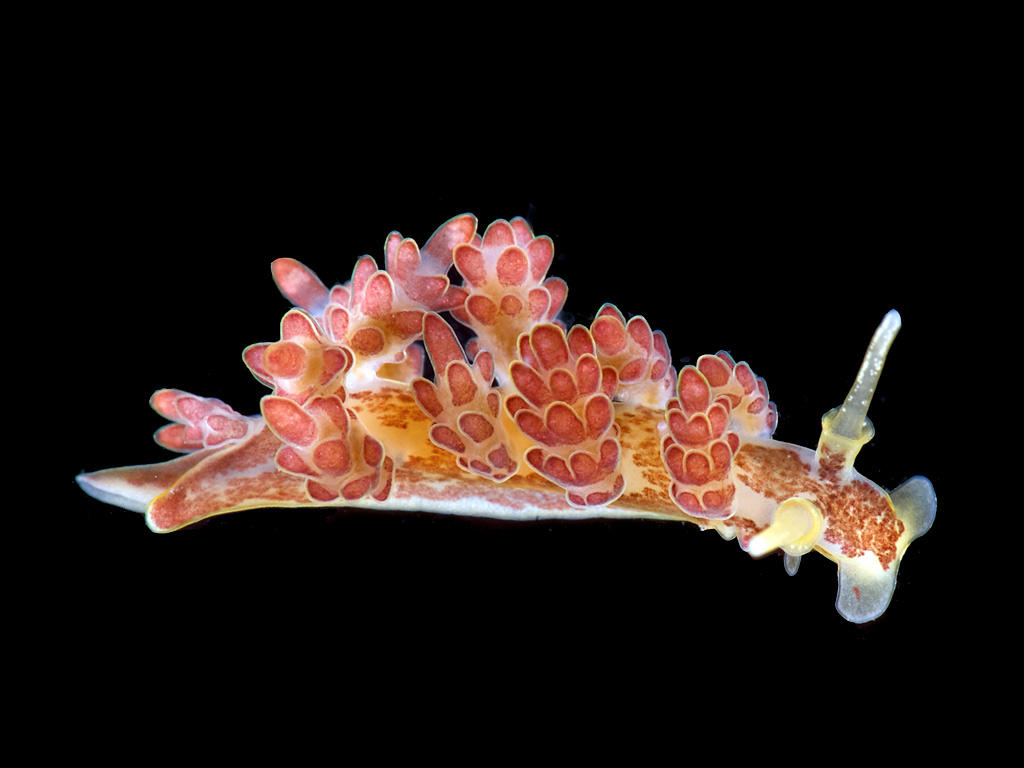
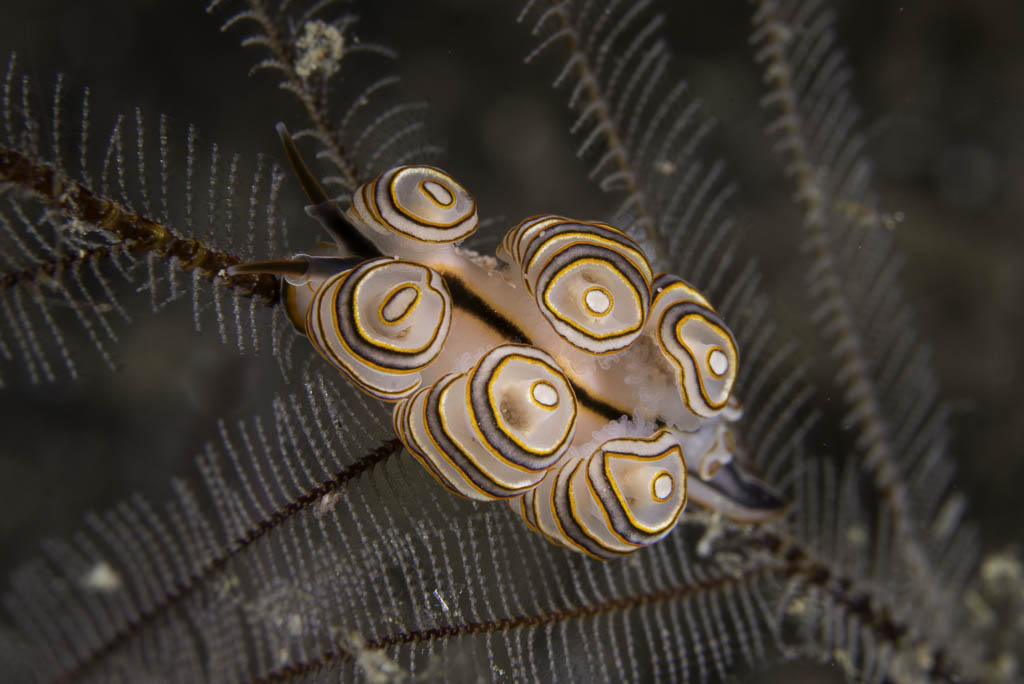
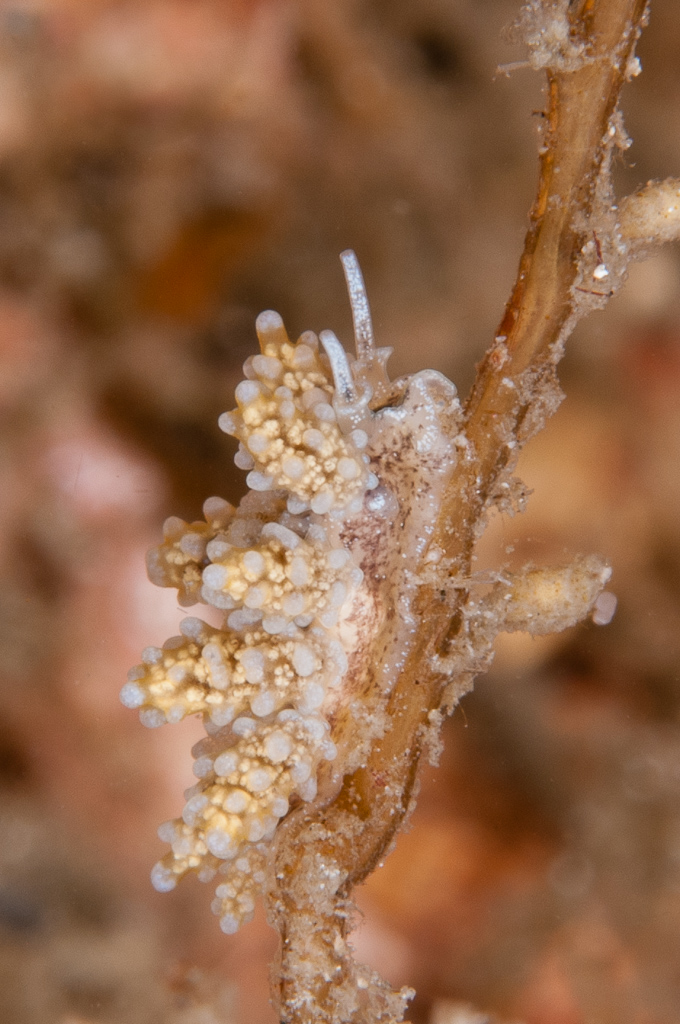
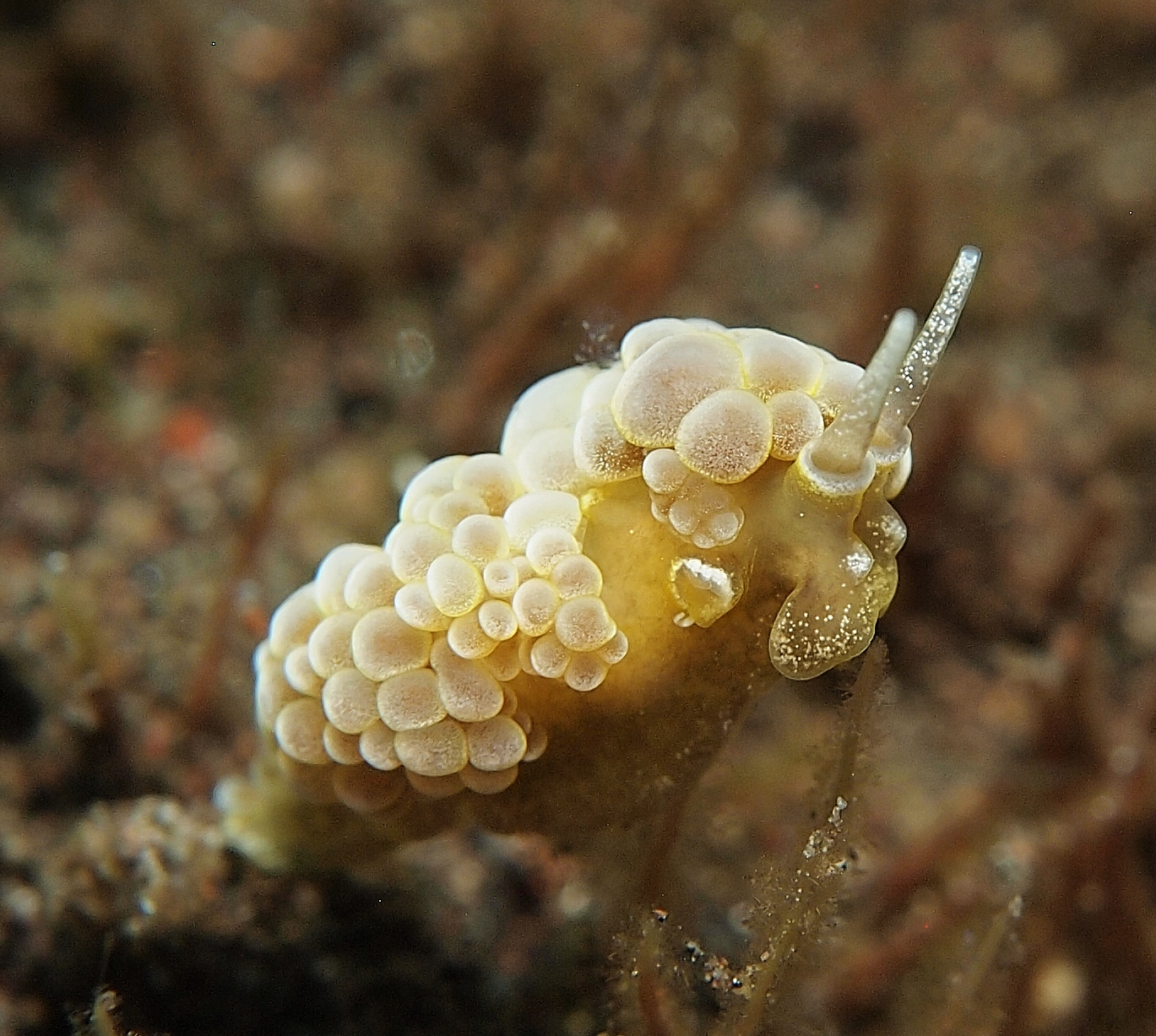
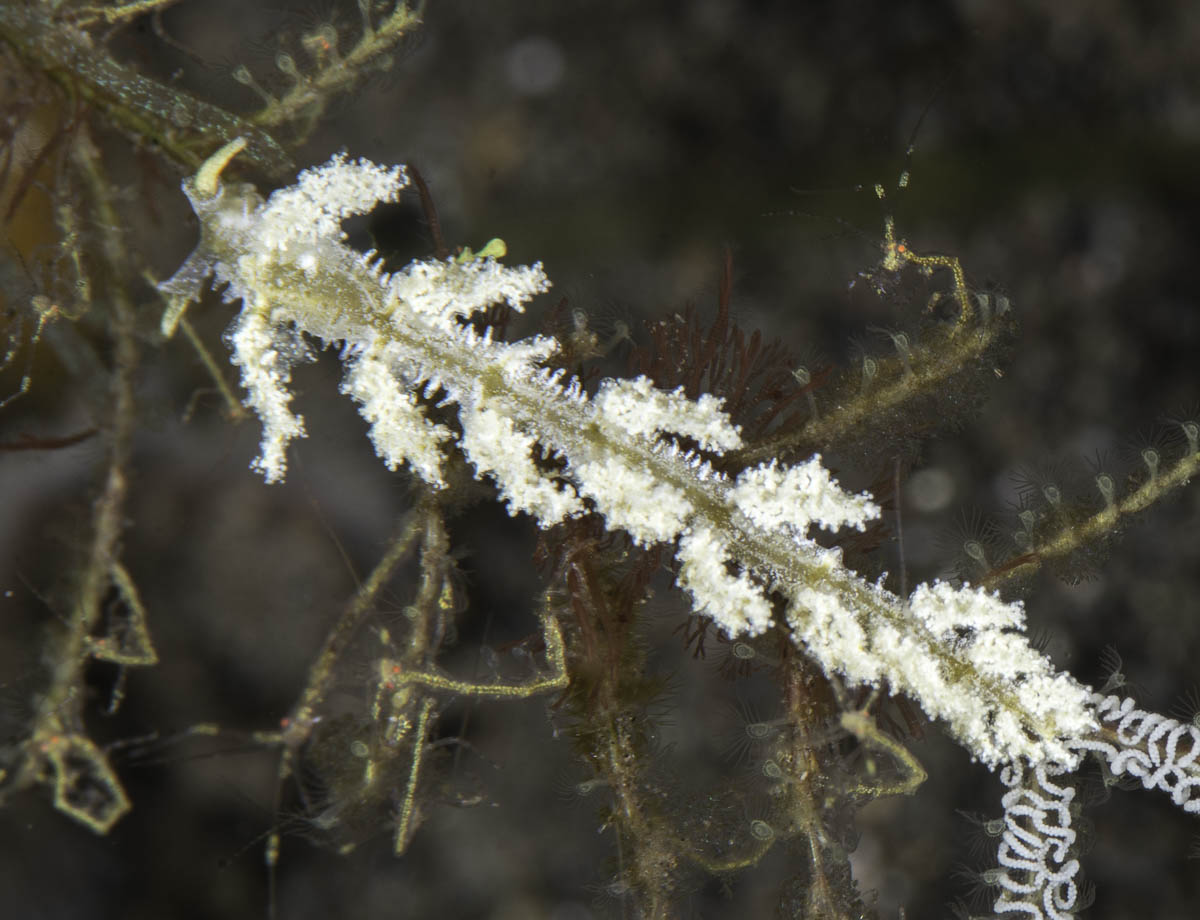
- From left to right in each row, from top to bottom: Doto amyra, Doto floridicola, Doto greenamyeri, Doto varaderoensis, Doto ussi, and Kabeiro phasmida

Scientific classification
- Kingdom: Animalia
- Phylum: Mollusca
- Class: Gastropoda
- Order: Nudibranchia
- Suborder: Dendronotacea
- Superfamily: Dendronotoidea
- Family: Dotidae; Gray, 1853

Genera
- See Genera

Synonyms
- Dotoidae · (incorrect subsequent spelling); Iduliidae

= Dotidae =

Family of gastropods

Dotidae is a family of nudibranchs, shell-less marine gastropod molluscs or sea slugs, in the superfamily Dendronotoidea.

== Nomenclature ==
This family has also been spelled in the past as "Dotonidae" and "Dotoidae". The International Commission on Zoological Nomenclature (ICZN) decided in 1964 that neither spelling was correct and adopted Dotidae Gray, 1853 as the accepted name for this family.

== Description ==
(Original description) Tentacles sheathed at the base and retractile; gills fusiform in shape, positioned along the sides of the back.

== Genera ==
The following genera are recognised in the family Dendronotidae:

- Caecinella Bergh, 1870
- Doto Oken, 1815
- Kabeiro Shipman & Gosliner, 2015
- Miesea Marcus, 1961

Synonyms

- Bornellopsis O'Donoghue, 1929: synonym of Doto Oken, 1815
- Dotilla Bergh, 1879:synonym of Doto Oken, 1815 (invalid: junior homonym of Dotilla Stimpson, 1858; Iduliella is a replacement name)
- Dotona Iredale, 1918: ssynonym of Doto Oken, 1815 (invalid: junior homonym of Dotona Carter, 1880)
- Subfamily Embletoniinae Pruvot-Fol, 1954: synonym of Embletoniidae Pruvot-Fol, 1954 (superseded rank)
- Gellina J. E. Gray, 1850:synonym of Doto Oken, 1815 (junior subjective synonym)
- Idalia Leach, 1847: synonym of Doto Oken, 1815(junior subjective synonym)
- Idulia Leach, 1852: synonym of Doto Oken, 1815 (misspelling - incorrect subsequent spelling, error for Idalia Leach, 1847)
- Iduliella Thiele, 1931: synonym of Doto Oken, 1815 (junior subjective synonym)
- Timorella Bergh, 1905: synonym of Doto Oken, 1815

== Distribution ==
This family occurs worldwide in cold and warm seas.
