= List of Nudibranchia of Ireland =

This is a list of Nudibranchia of Ireland. It is part of the List of marine molluscs of Ireland.

Family Goniodorididae:

- Goniodoris castanea Alder & Hancock, 1845
- Goniodoris nodosa Montagu, 1808
- Okenia elegans Leuckart, 1828 - yellow skirt slug
- Okenia leachii Alder & Hancock, 1854
- Ancula gibbosa Risso, 1818 - Atlantic ancula
- Trapania pallida Kress, 1968

Family Onchidorididae:

- Onchidoris bilamellata Linnaeus, 1767 - rough-mantled doris
- Onchidoris loveni Alder & Hancock, 1862
- Onchidoris muricata O F Müller, 1776
- Onchidoris proxima Alder & Hancock, 1854
- Idaliadoris depressa Alder & Hancock, 1842
- Atalodoris oblonga Alder & Hancock, 1845
- Atalodoris pusilla Alder & Hancock, 1845
- Atalodoris sparsa Alder & Hancock, 1846

Family Calycidorididae:

- Diaphorodoris luteocincta M Sars, 1870

Family Acanthodorididae:

- Acanthodoris pilosa Abildgaard in O F Müller, 1789 - hairy spiny doris

Family Aegiridae:

- Aegires punctilucens Orbigny, 1837

Family Polyceridae:

- Crimora papillata Alder & Hancock, 1862
- Polycera elegans Bergh, 1894
- Polycera faeroensis Lemche, 1929
- Polycera quadrilineata O F Müller, 1776
- Limacia clavigera O F Müller, 1776 - orange-clubbed sea slug
- Palio dubia M Sars, 1829
- Palio nothus Johnston, 1838
- Thecacera pennigera Montagu, 1813 - winged thecacera

Family Cadlinidae:

- Cadlina laevis Linnaeus, 1767 - white Atlantic cadlina
- Aldisa zetlandica Alder & Hancock, 1854

Family Arminidae:

- Armina loveni Bergh, 1860

Family Dorididae:

- Doris pseudoargus Rapp, 1827
- Doris sticta Iredale & O'Donoghue, 1923

Family Discodorididae:

- Rostanga rubra Risso, 1818
- Geitodoris planata Alder & Hancock, 1846
- Jorunna tomentosa Cuvier, 1804

Family Janolidae:

- Antiopella cristata delle Chiaje, 1841 - crested aeolis
- Janolus hyalinus Alder & Hancock, 1854

Family Proctonotidae:

- Proctonotus mucroniferus Alder & Hancock, 1844

Family Tritoniidae:

- Tritonia hombergii Cuvier, 1803
- Duvaucelia lineata Alder & Hancock, 1848
- Duvaucelia odhneri Marcus, 1983
- Duvaucelia plebeia Johnston, 1828 - European nudibranch
- Lomanotus genei Verany, 1846
- Lomanotus marmoratus Alder & Hancock, 1845

Family Scyllaeidae:

- Scyllaea pelagica Linnaeus, 1758 (Vagrant) - sargassum nudibranch

Family Hancockiidae:

- Hancockia uncinata Hesse, 1872

Family Dendronotidae:

- Dendronotus frondosus Ascanius, 1774

Family Dotidae:

- Doto coronata Gmelin, 1791
- Doto cuspidata Alder & Hancock, 1862
- Doto dunnei Lemche, 1976
- Doto eireana Lemche, 1976
- Doto fragilis Forbes, 1838
- Doto hystrix Picton & Brown, 1981
- Doto koenneckeri Lemche, 1976
- Doto lemchei Ortea & Urgorri, 1978
- Doto maculata Montagu, 1804
- Doto millbayana Lemche, 1976
- Doto pinnatifida Montagu, 1804
- Doto tuberculata Lemche, 1976

Family Embletoniidae:

- Embletonia pulchra Alder & Hancock, 1844

Family Coryphellidae:

- Coryphella gracilis Alder & Hancock, 1844 - slender eolis
- Coryphella verrucosa M Sars, 1829
- Fjordia browni Picton, 1980
- Fjordia lineata Lovén, 1846

Family Flabellinidae:

- Flabellina pellucida Alder & Hancock, 1843
- Edmundsella pedata Montagu, 1815

Family Tergipedidae:

- Tergipes tergipes Forsskål, 1775

Family Trinchesiidae:

- Trinchesia caerulea Montagu, 1804
- Trinchesia foliata Forbes & Goodsir, 1839
- Trinchesia genovae O'Donoghue, 1926
- Catriona gymnota Couthouy, 1838
- Rubramoena amoena Alder & Hancock, 1845
- Rubramoena rubescens Picton & Brown, 1978
- Fiocuthona concinna Alder & Hancock, 1843
- Cuthona nana Alder & Hancock, 1842
- Zelentia pustulata Alder & Hancock, 1854
- Diaphoreolis viridis Forbes, 1840

Family Eubranchidae:

- Eubranchus tricolor Forbes, 1838 - painted balloon aeolis
- Capellinia doriae Trinchese, 1874
- Capellinia vittata Alder & Hancock, 1842
- Nudibranchus exiguus Alder & Hancock, 1848
- Amphorina farrani Alder & Hancock, 1844
- Amphorina pallida Alder & Hancock, 1842

Family Cumanotidae:

- Cumanotus beaumonti Eliot, 1906

Family Fionidae:

- Fiona pinnata Eschscholtz, 1831 Vagrant - fiona

Family Calmidae:

- Calma glaucoides Alder & Hancock, 1854

Family Facelinidae:

- Facelina annulicornis Chamisso & Eysenhardt, 1821
- Facelina auriculata O F Müller, 1776 - slim aesop
- Facelina bostoniensis Couthouy, 1838
- Facelina dubia Pruvot-Fol, 1949
- Caloria elegans Alder & Hancock, 1845
- Dicata odhneri Schmekel, 1967

Family Favorinidae:

- Favorinus blianus Lemche & Thompson, 1974
- Favorinus branchialis Rathke, 1806

Family Aeolidiidae:

- Aeolidia papillosa Linnaeus, 1761 - common grey sea slug
- Aeolidiella alderi Cocks, 1852
- Aeolidiella glauca Alder & Hancock, 1845
- Aeolidiella sanguinea Norman, 1877
