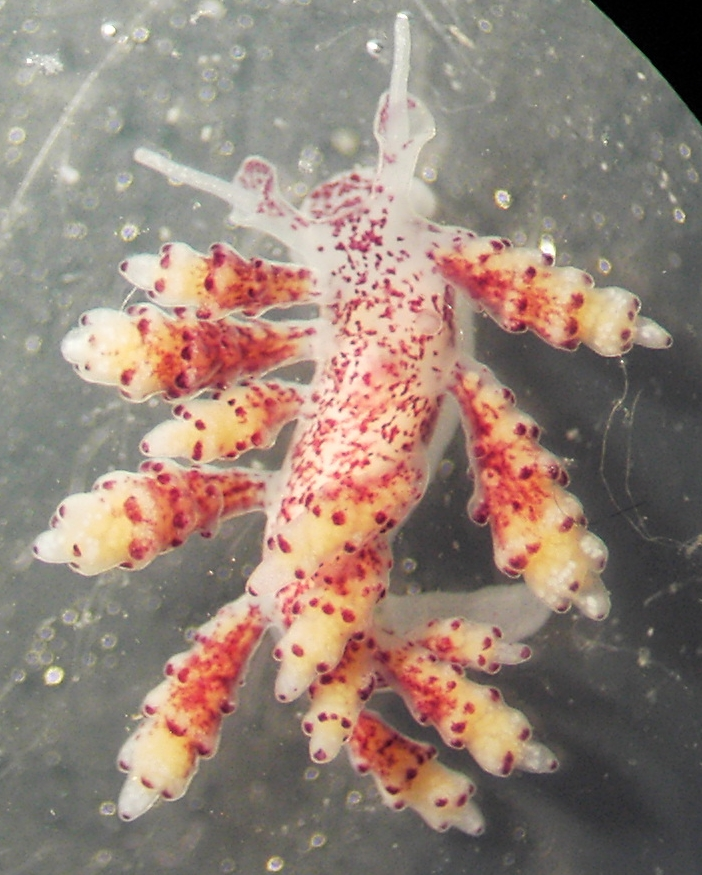
- The nudibranch Doto coronata, from the coast of Wimereux (Pas-de-Calais, France)

Scientific classification
- Kingdom: Animalia
- Phylum: Mollusca
- Class: Gastropoda
- Order: Nudibranchia
- Suborder: Dendronotacea
- Family: Dotidae
- Genus: Doto
- Species: D. coronata

Binomial name
- Doto coronata (Gmelin, 1791)

Synonyms
- Doris coronata Gmelin, 1791 (basionym); Doto costae Trinchese, 1881

= Doto coronata =

Species of mollusc

Doto coronata is a species of small sea slug or nudibranch, a shell-less marine gastropod mollusc in the family Dotidae. It is the type species of the genus Doto.

== Doto coronata sensu lato ==
Before 1976 a number of species were called by the name Doto coronata and the process of splitting this complex into species was started by Henning Lemche. Species with translucent white bodies and red or black spots on the cerata which were formerly identified as Doto coronata include:

- Doto africoronata Shipman & Gosliner, 2015
- Doto dunnei Lemche, 1976
- Doto eireana Lemche, 1976
- Doto hydrallmaniae Morrow, Thorpe & Picton, 1992
- Doto koenneckeri Lemche, 1976
- Doto maculata (Montagu, 1804)
- Doto millbayana Lemche, 1976
- Doto onusta Hesse, 1872
- Doto sarsiae Morrow, Thorpe & Picton, 1992

== Distribution ==
The type locality for this species is on the Dutch coast. A specimen from near Goes, Eastern Scheldt, Zeeland was designated as a neotype in a recent review of the genus Doto. It has been reported elsewhere in the North Atlantic Ocean (European waters, Canada, Gulf of Maine) and the Mediterranean Sea (Greece) but many records are likely to be of sibling species. It was erroneously reported from around the South African coast where it is found from the Atlantic coast to Knysna and this species has been described as Doto africoronata.

== Description ==
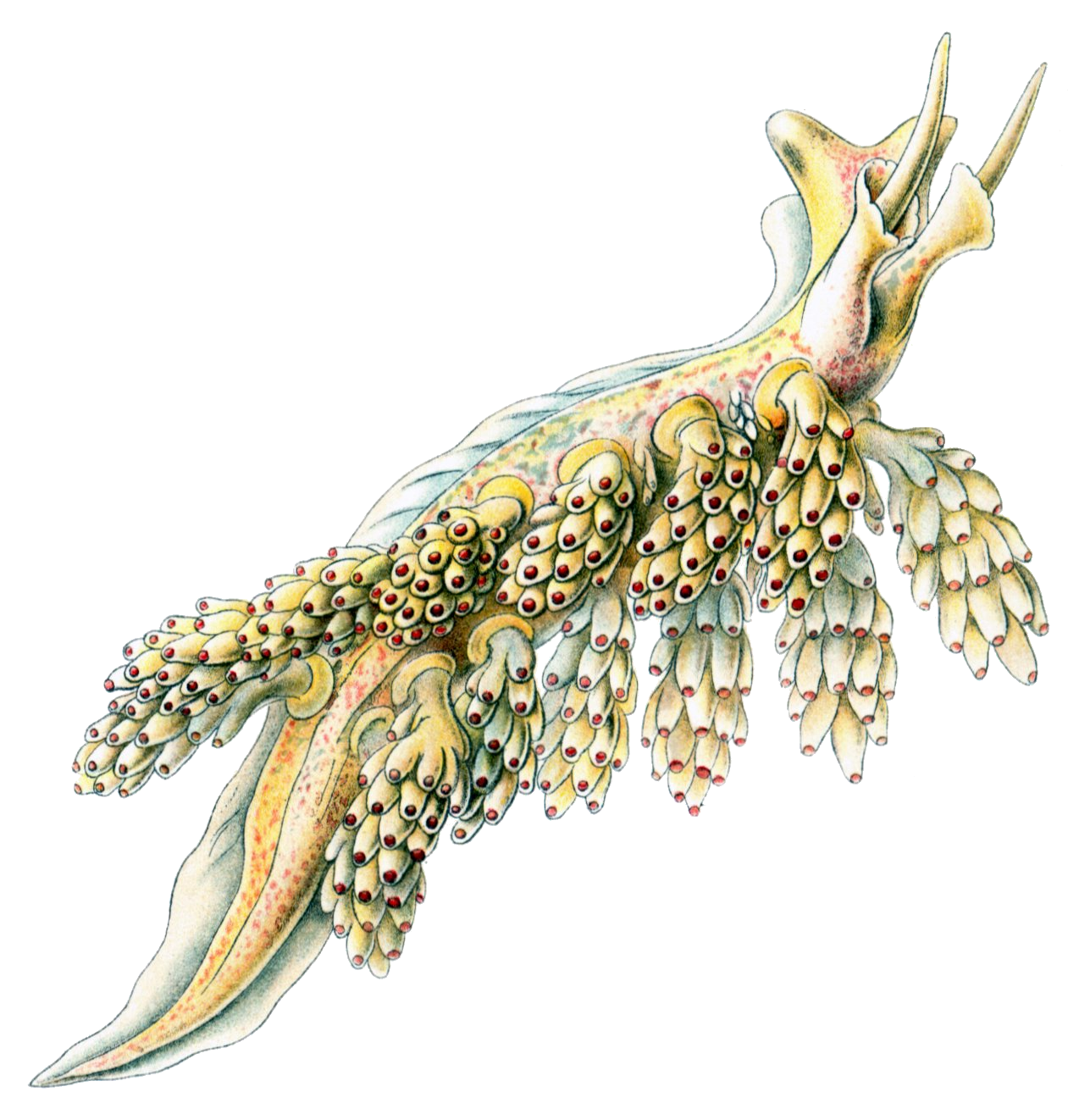
Drawing of Doto coronata from Kunstformen der Natur (1904)

This species is a small nudibranch, with grape-bunch-like clusters of cerata extending in pairs along the sides of the body. In all Doto the rhinophores extend from cup-like sheaths. Doto coronata is translucent white in colour with mottling of dark red on the back and sides of the body. The ceratal tubercles are tipped with round red spots. There is a patch of dark red pigment on the inner faces of the cerata.

The maximum recorded body length is 15 mm.

== Ecology ==
Minimum recorded depth is 4 m. Maximum recorded depth is 27 m.

Doto coronata feeds on hydroids, especially Obelia spp. Campanulariidae and Sertularia cupressina Sertulariidae. Its egg mass is a white ribbon laid in a zigzag pattern, usually on or at the base of the hydroids it is feeding on. It is a host of the ectoparasitic crustaceans Doridicola agilis Leydig, 1853 and Splanchnotrophus brevipes Hancock & Norman, 1863 and the endoparasitic crustacean Lomanoticola brevipes (Hancock & Norman, 1863)
