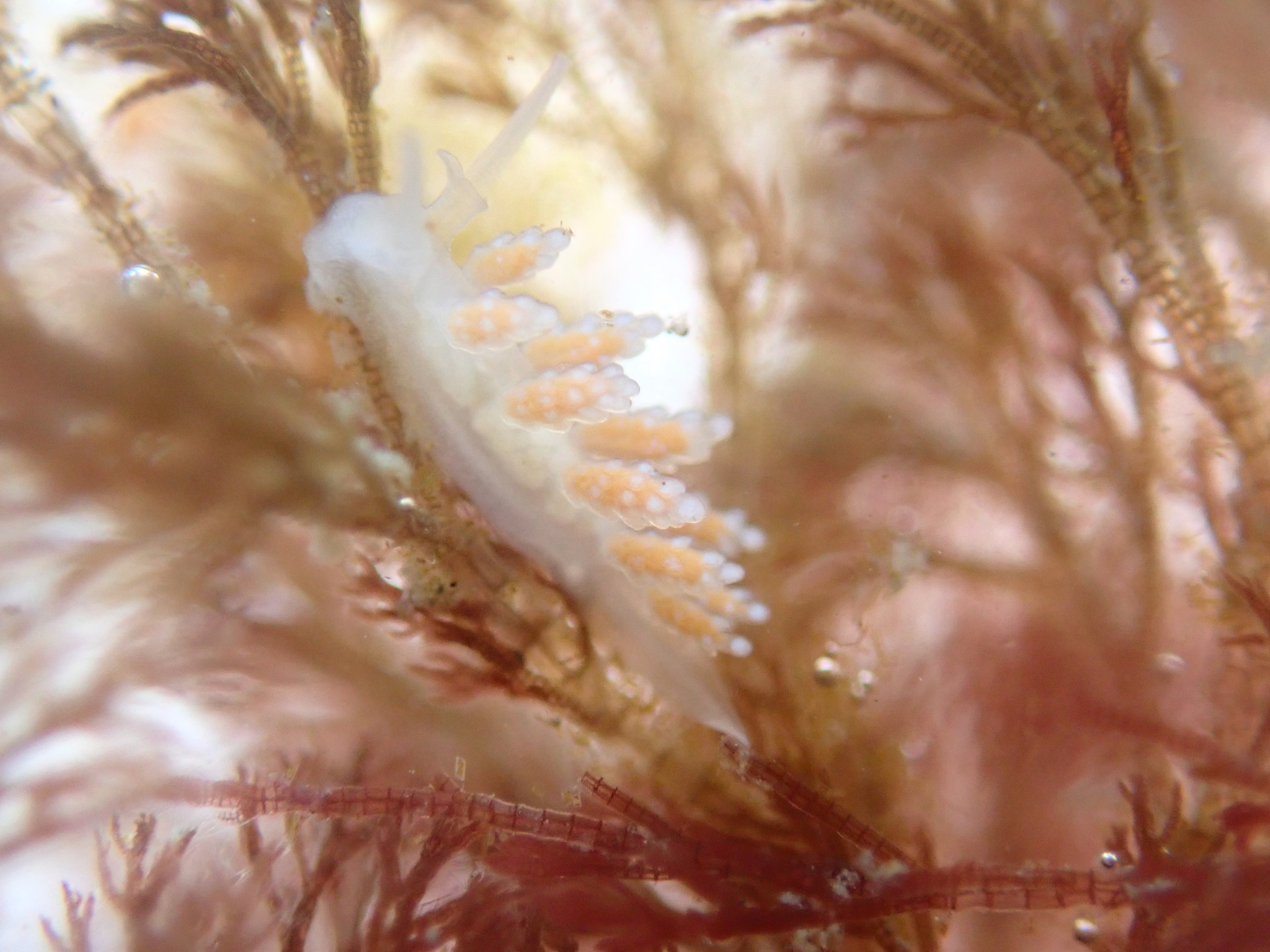
- Monterey, CA, 2026

Scientific classification
- Kingdom: Animalia
- Phylum: Mollusca
- Class: Gastropoda
- Order: Nudibranchia
- Suborder: Dendronotacea
- Family: Dotidae
- Genus: Doto
- Species: D. urak

Binomial name
- Doto urak Gosliner & Adayapalam, 2025

= Doto urak =

Species of gastropod

Doto urak is a species of small nudibranch sea slug in the family Dotidae.

== Distribution ==
Doto urak was first described from the San Pedro Harbor in Los Angeles, California. It has since been observed as far south as San Diego and as far north as Eureka, California.

== Description ==
Doto urak has a translucent white body that is 4-7 mm in length. It has distinctive pink digestive glands that protrude from the stomach and into the 4-7 pairs of dorsal projections called cerata. The cerata are each covered in white, egg-shaped tubercles. Unlike in the related D. amyra, the tubercles of D. urak have opaque white glands on their surfaces. Other distinguishing features of D. urak include longer rhinophores with flared sheaths, as well as darker digestive glands.

== Ecology ==
Like other members of its genus, D. urak feeds on hydroids. Unlike related species of Doto, the juvenile D. urak can feed themselves immediately after hatching from their larval stage.

== Biology ==
Like most sea slugs, D. urak is a simultaneous hemaphrodite. However, it has a reproductive system that is distinct from other Doto. Its female and male reproductive tracts are connected. The planktotrophic larvae are also distinct from the lecithotrophic larvae of other Doto.

== Etymology ==
The specific epithet urak comes from the southern Ohlone word meaning salmon, in reference to the distinctive salmon pink or orange color on the organism's cerata. It was described and named in 2025 by Terry Gosliner, who has helped describe and name over 450 species of sea slugs, or nearly a quarter of all sea slugs species on Earth.
