= Lemche =

Lemche may refer to:

- Henning Mourier Lemche (1904–1977), Danish zoologist
- Kris Lemche (born 1978), Canadian actor
- Matt Lemche, Canadian actor
- Niels Peter Lemche (born 1945), Danish biblical scholar
