= Doto cristal =

Scientific classification
- Kingdom: Animalia
- Phylum: Mollusca
- Class: Gastropoda
- Order: Nudibranchia
- Suborder: Dendronotacea
- Family: Dotidae
- Genus: Doto
- Species: D. cristal

Binomial name
- Doto cristal Ortea, 2010

Species of gastropod

Doto cristal is a species of sea slug, a nudibranch, a marine gastropod mollusc in the family Dotidae.

== Distribution ==
This species was described from a single specimen, 2.5 mm in length, collected at Manzanillo, Limón, Costa Rica.

== Description ==
This nudibranch is transparent with no pigment apart from a few white glands in the rhinophore sheaths and rhinophores. The cerata have rather pointed tubercles and are also transparent with snow white digestive gland inside them.

== Ecology ==
Doto cristal was found amongst algae.
