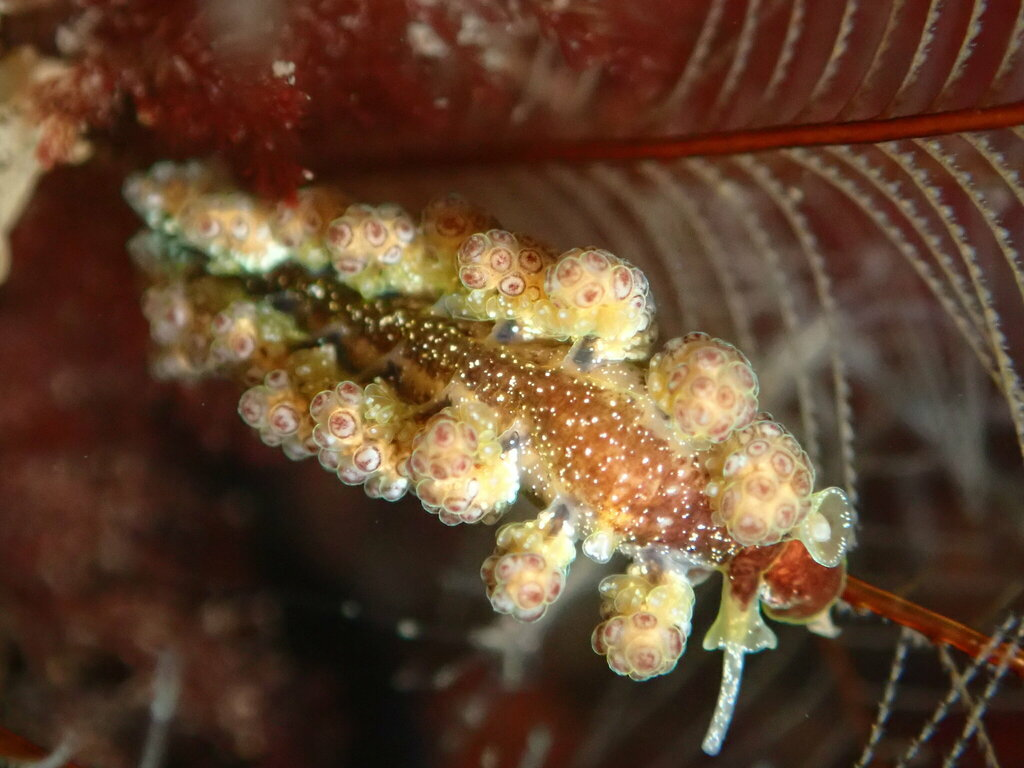

Scientific classification
- Kingdom: Animalia
- Phylum: Mollusca
- Class: Gastropoda
- Order: Nudibranchia
- Suborder: Dendronotacea
- Family: Dotidae
- Genus: Doto
- Species: D. lancei

Binomial name
- Doto lancei Er. Marcus & Ev. Marcus, 1967

= Doto lancei =

Species of gastropod

Doto lancei is a species of sea slug, a nudibranch, a marine gastropod mollusc in the family Dotidae.

== Distribution ==
This species was first described from Baja California Peninsula, Mexico. It has been reported from the Pacific coast of North America from San Diego south to Costa Rica.

== Description ==
This species of Doto has a cream coloured body with extensive areas of dark brown or black pigment on the back and sides. The most well-developed ceratal tubercles have rings of dark pigment at their bases and a dark spot at the tip.

== Ecology ==
Doto lancei feeds on the hydroid Aglaophenia sp., family Aglaopheniidae.
