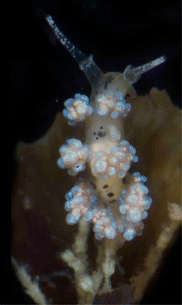
- Dorsal view of Doto escatllari on substrate

Scientific classification
- Kingdom: Animalia
- Phylum: Mollusca
- Class: Gastropoda
- Order: Nudibranchia
- Suborder: Dendronotacea
- Family: Dotidae
- Genus: Doto
- Species: D. escatllari

Binomial name
- Doto escatllari Ortea, Moro & Espinosa, 1998

= Doto escatllari =

Species of gastropod

Doto escatllari is a species of sea slug, a nudibranch, a marine gastropod mollusc in the family Dotidae.

== Distribution ==
This species was first described from the Canary Islands. It has subsequently been reported from the Caribbean coast of Costa Rica, Barbados and Panama.

== Description ==
The body is short and narrow. Rhinophores are smooth and with opaque white dots. Rhinophoral sheaths are with small frontal extensions. Cerata are large with rounded tubercles; apical tubercles much larger than the rest. The cerata are translucent blue, and the ceratal tubercles have no dark spots and contain dense concentrations of rounded hyaline glandular structures. Background color is translucent gray with a series of dark brown spots on the dorsum. Cerata are with dark brown branches of the digestive gland and bluish tubercles. This dendronotid nudibranch is translucent white with mid-sized black spots scattered over the top and sides of the body. In the internal base of the ceratal peduncle there is a black mark below the three-lobed transparent pseudobranch.

The maximum recorded body length is 5 mm or 6 mm.

== Ecology ==
Minimum recorded depth is 1 m. Maximum recorded depth is 4 m.

Doto escatllari was found associated with small hydroids of the family Sertulariidae; these are probably its prey.
