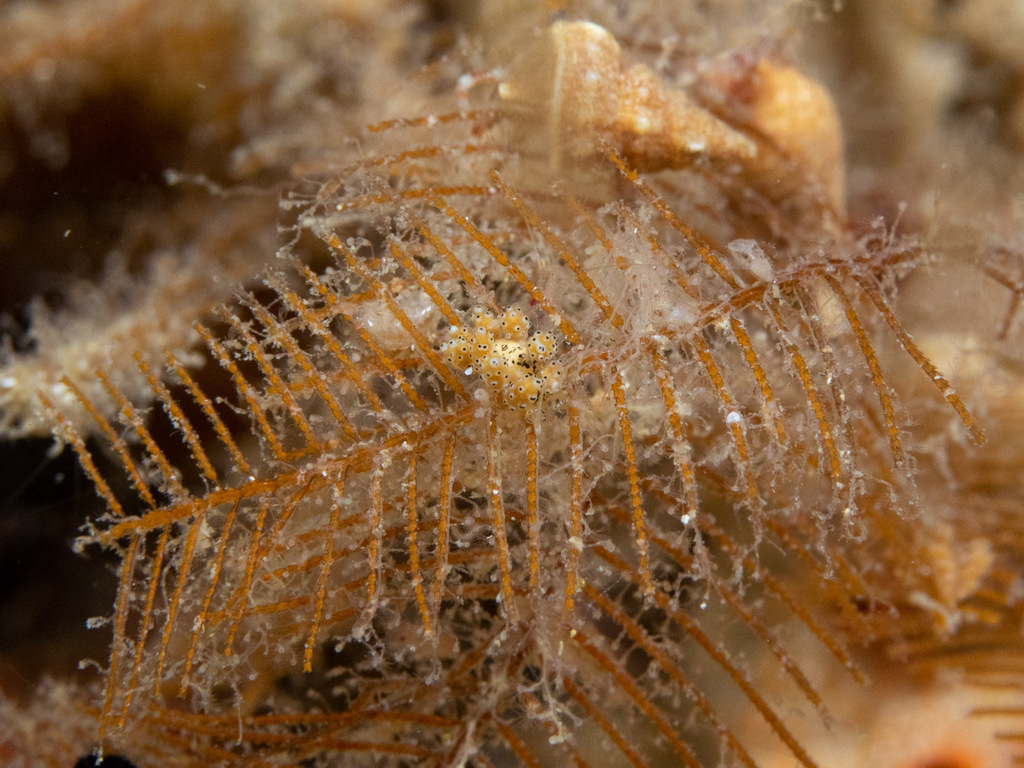

Scientific classification
- Kingdom: Animalia
- Phylum: Mollusca
- Class: Gastropoda
- Order: Nudibranchia
- Suborder: Dendronotacea
- Family: Dotidae
- Genus: Doto
- Species: D. ostenta

Binomial name
- Doto ostenta Burn, 1958

= Doto ostenta =

Species of gastropod

Doto ostenta is a species of sea slug, a nudibranch, a marine gastropod mollusc in the family Dotidae.

== Distribution ==
This species was described from south-eastern Australia. It is found in the states of Victoria and New South Wales in water depths of 0 m to 85 m.

== Description ==
This nudibranch is transparent white with small spots and patches of black scattered on the back and sides of the body. The typical Doto cerata have moderately elongate tubercles which each have a black spot at the tip. The digestive gland inside the cerata is a pink cream colour.

== Ecology ==
Doto ostenta is found on hydroids, on which it presumably feeds.
