= Doto duao =

Scientific classification
- Kingdom: Animalia
- Phylum: Mollusca
- Class: Gastropoda
- Order: Nudibranchia
- Suborder: Dendronotacea
- Family: Dotidae
- Genus: Doto
- Species: D. duao

Binomial name
- Doto duao Ortea, 2001

Species of gastropod

Doto duao is a species of sea slug, a nudibranch, a marine gastropod mollusc in the family Dotidae.

== Distribution ==
This species was described from the Caribbean coast of Costa Rica.

== Description ==
This nudibranch is translucent white with fine brown spotting on the top and sides of the body and clear patches around the bases of the cerata. The cerata have a blue iridescence and the tubercles have internal blue spots. There is always a crescent-shaped red spot on the inner base of the peduncle at the insertion of cerata into the body.

The maximum recorded body length is 6 mm.

== Ecology ==
Minimum recorded depth is 10 m. Maximum recorded depth is 19 m.

Doto duao was found associated with small hydroids of the family Sertulariidae; these are probably its prey.
