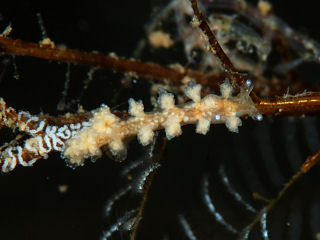

Scientific classification
- Kingdom: Animalia
- Phylum: Mollusca
- Class: Gastropoda
- Order: Nudibranchia
- Suborder: Dendronotacea
- Family: Dotidae
- Genus: Doto
- Species: D. pita

Binomial name
- Doto pita Er. Marcus, 1955

= Doto pita =

Species of gastropod

Doto pita is a species of sea slug, a small nudibranch, a shell-less marine gastropod mollusc in the family Dotidae.

== Distribution ==
Doto pita occurs in the Caribbean Sea and tropical west Atlantic Ocean, from Brazil to Florida. Reports from Japan, and New Zealand, may be the result of accidental transport by human agency or simply misidentifications.

== Description ==
The body is translucent white with some brown spots at the bases of the cerata. The digestive gland is cream and the cerata are rather irregular in appearance.

The maximum recorded body length is 7 mm.

== Habitat ==
Minimum recorded depth is 0 m. Maximum recorded depth is 25 m.
