= Doto alidrisi =

Scientific classification
- Kingdom: Animalia
- Phylum: Mollusca
- Class: Gastropoda
- Order: Nudibranchia
- Suborder: Dendronotacea
- Family: Dotidae
- Genus: Doto
- Species: D. alidrisi

Binomial name
- Doto alidrisi Ortea, Moro & Ocaña, 2010

Species of gastropod

Doto alidrisi is a species of sea slug, a nudibranch, a marine gastropod mollusc in the family Dotidae.

== Distribution ==
This species was described from Ceuta, an autonomous city of Spain on the north coast of Africa, at the entrance to the Mediterranean Sea.

== Description ==
The body of this nudibranch is mostly translucent white in colour, with fine mottling of black along the middle of the back and the sides of the body. The ceratal tubercles are unusually elongate with the terminal tubercle being one third of the length of the entire ceras.

== Ecology ==
The diet of Doto alidrisi is currently unknown.
