= Doto caballa =

Scientific classification
- Kingdom: Animalia
- Phylum: Mollusca
- Class: Gastropoda
- Order: Nudibranchia
- Suborder: Dendronotacea
- Family: Dotidae
- Genus: Doto
- Species: D. caballa

Binomial name
- Doto caballa Ortea, Moro & Bacallado, 2010

Species of gastropod

Doto caballa is a species of sea slug, a nudibranch, a marine gastropod mollusc in the family Dotidae.

== Distribution ==
This species was described from Ceuta, an autonomous city of Spain on the north coast of Africa, and Albufeira on the south coast of Portugal, both localities at the entrance to the Mediterranean Sea.

== Description ==
The body of this nudibranch is mostly translucent white in colour, with dense spots and dots of black along the middle of the back and more widely spaced spots on the sides of the body. The ceratal tubercles are short and usually have black spots at the tips

== Ecology ==
The diet of Doto caballa is currently unknown.
