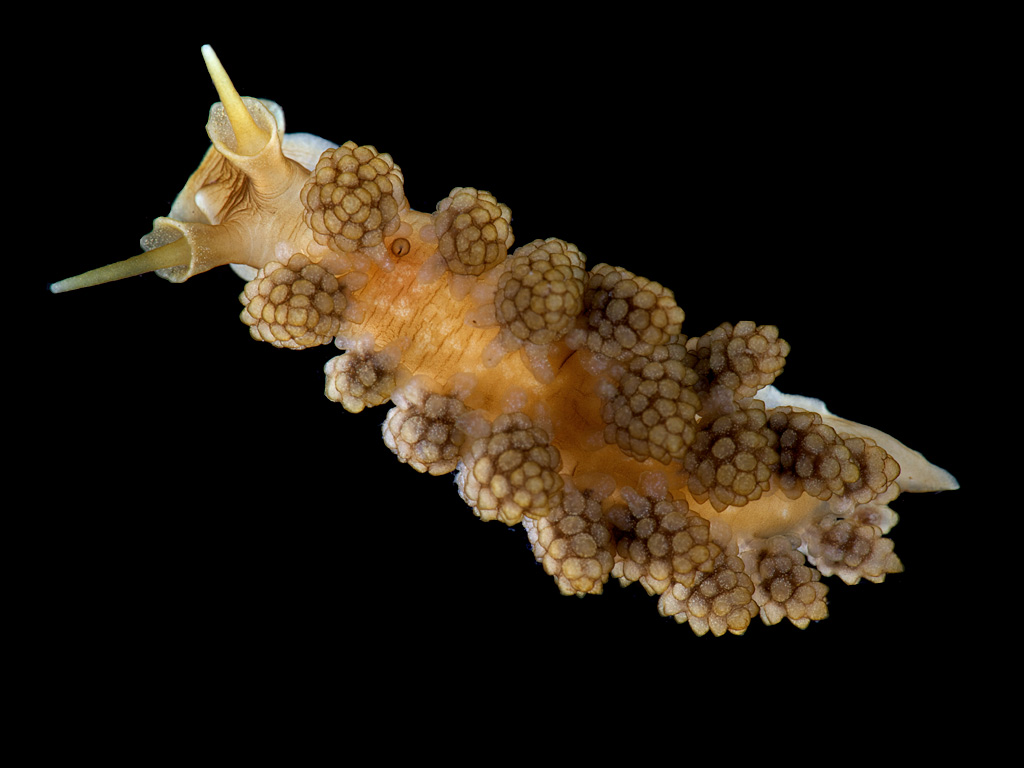
- The nudibranch Doto fragilis, Pembrokeshire, Wales, U

Scientific classification
- Kingdom: Animalia
- Phylum: Mollusca
- Class: Gastropoda
- Order: Nudibranchia
- Suborder: Dendronotacea
- Family: Dotidae
- Genus: Doto
- Species: D. fragilis

Binomial name
- Doto fragilis Forbes, 1838

Synonyms
- Doto aurita Hesse, 1872 (dubious synonym); Doto pinnigera Hesse, 1872; Melibaea fragilis Forbes, 1838; Meliboea minuta Forbes, 1844

= Doto fragilis =

Species of gastropod

Doto fragilis is a species of sea slug, a nudibranch, a marine gastropod mollusc in the family Dotidae.

Subspecies

- Doto fragilis nipponensis Baba, 1971
- Doto fragilis umia Ev. Marcus & Er. Marcus, 1969: synonym of Doto chica Ev. Marcus & Er. Marcus, 1960

== Distribution ==
This species was first described from the Isle of Man in the Irish Sea in 1838 by the famed naturalist Edward Forbes. It has subsequently been reported from all around Britain and Ireland and continental coasts south to Portugal and into the Mediterranean Sea.

== Description ==
The body of this nudibranch is predominantly brown in colour. There is a series of pale patches along the sides of the body.

== Ecology ==
Doto fragilis feeds on the hydroids Nemertesia antennina and Nemertesia ramosa, family Plumulariidae.
