= Doto galapagoensis =

Scientific classification
- Kingdom: Animalia
- Phylum: Mollusca
- Class: Gastropoda
- Order: Nudibranchia
- Suborder: Dendronotacea
- Family: Dotidae
- Genus: Doto
- Species: D. galapagoensis

Binomial name
- Doto galapagoensis Ortea, 2010

Species of gastropod

Doto galapagoensis is a species of sea slug, a nudibranch, a marine gastropod mollusc in the family Dotidae.

== Distribution ==
This species was first described from Floreana, Galapagos Islands.

== Description ==
This nudibranch is translucent white mottled with black or ash-grey spots on the surface. The cerata are transparent with cream or white digestive gland inside. The terminal tubercle has an internal black spherical spot. The only animal known was probably a juvenile, only 3 mm in length when alive and moving. There were 5 pairs of cerata, but only the first two were developed with surface tubercles.

== Ecology ==
Doto galapagoensis was found associated with small hydroids.
