= Doto sabuli =

Scientific classification
- Kingdom: Animalia
- Phylum: Mollusca
- Class: Gastropoda
- Order: Nudibranchia
- Suborder: Dendronotacea
- Family: Dotidae
- Genus: Doto
- Species: D. sabuli

Binomial name
- Doto sabuli Ortea, 2001

Species of gastropod

Doto sabuli is a species of sea slug, a nudibranch, a marine gastropod mollusc in the family Dotidae.

== Distribution ==
This species was described from Puerto Morelos, Quintana Roo, Mexico. It has also been reported from Lake Surprise, Florida and the Bahamas.

== Description ==
The body is translucent with dense surface speckling of red-brown pigment on the back and sides. The areas at the base of the cerata are clear of pigment. There are no dark spots on the ceratal tubercles, just many small white glands below the skin.

The maximum recorded body length is 5 mm.

== Ecology ==
Minimum recorded depth is 0.6 m. Maximum recorded depth is 0.6 m.

Doto sabuli was found associated with small hydroids which were growing on the rhizomes of algae in shallow water.
