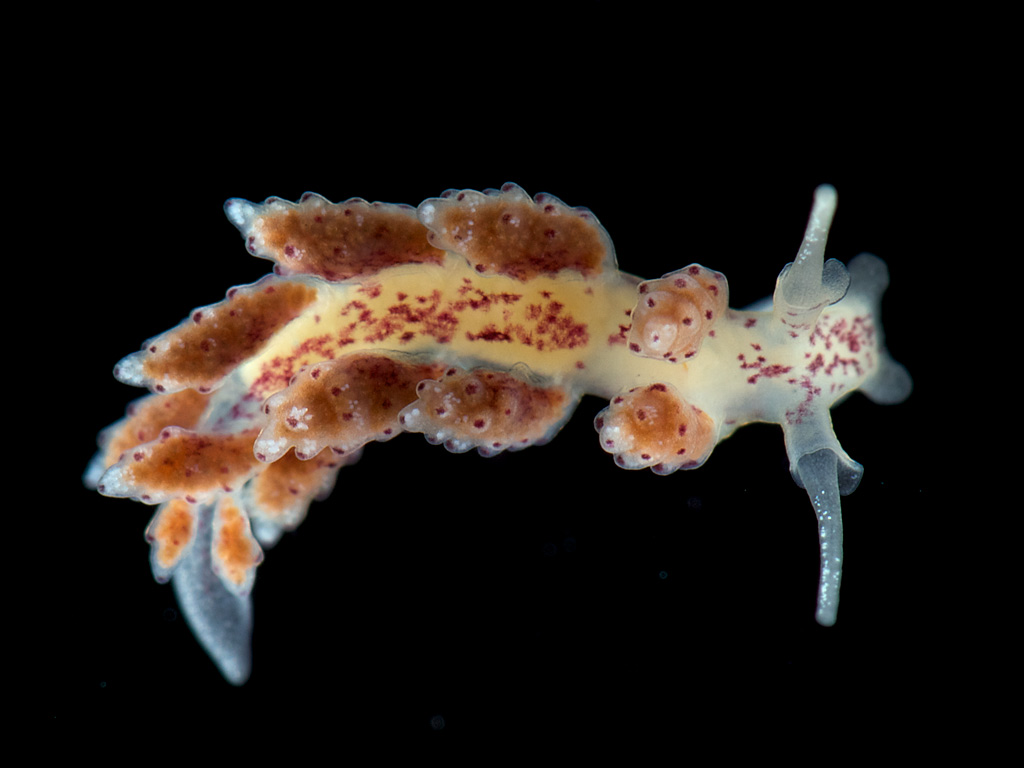
- The nudibranch Doto onusta, Strangford Lough, Co. Down, Northern Ireland, UK.

Scientific classification
- Kingdom: Animalia
- Phylum: Mollusca
- Class: Gastropoda
- Order: Nudibranchia
- Suborder: Dendronotacea
- Family: Dotidae
- Genus: Doto
- Species: D. onusta

Binomial name
- Doto onusta Hesse, 1872

= Doto onusta =

Species of gastropod

Doto onusta is a species of sea slug, a nudibranch, a marine gastropod mollusc in the family Dotidae.

It is considered a dubious synonym of Doto floridicola Simroth, 1888 by the World Register of Marine Species

== Distribution ==
This species was first described from Brittany, France. It has rarely been reported since the original description. Henning Lemche identified it with the common species which feeds on the hydroid Dynamena pumila, predominantly in the intertidal region.

== Description ==
This nudibranch is translucent white with dark red spots on the ceratal tubercles. The back and sides are spattered with red pigment which extends up the inner faces of the rhinophore sheaths. It is illustrated in colour in a more detailed publication by Hesse in 1873.

== Ecology ==
Doto onusta feeds on the hydroid Dynamena pumila, family Sertulariidae.
