= Doto acuta =

Scientific classification
- Kingdom: Animalia
- Phylum: Mollusca
- Class: Gastropoda
- Order: Nudibranchia
- Suborder: Dendronotacea
- Family: Dotidae
- Genus: Doto
- Species: D. acuta

Binomial name
- Doto acuta Schmekel & Kress, 1977

Species of gastropod

Doto acuta is a species of sea slug, a nudibranch, a marine gastropod mollusc in the family Dotidae.

== Distribution ==
This species was described from Naples, Italy, in the Mediterranean Sea. The 3.5 mm long holotype was collected on the hydroid Obelia geniculata, which was growing on the sea grass Posidonia at 10m depth off Capo Posillipo.

== Description ==
The body of this nudibranch is mostly transparent cadmium yellow in colour, with minute dots of black and a black line of pigment on the inner side of the ceratal bases. Each ceratal tubercle is topped with a black spot. There is a black band below the tip of the rhinophore, and a more diffuse band lower down. The maximum length of this species is 7 mm.

== Ecology ==
Doto acuta is found on colonies of the hydroid, Obelia geniculata (family Campanulariidae), on which it feeds. The eggs normally hatch into young slugs after metamorphosis (direct development), or there may be a short swimming larval phase of 2 days.
