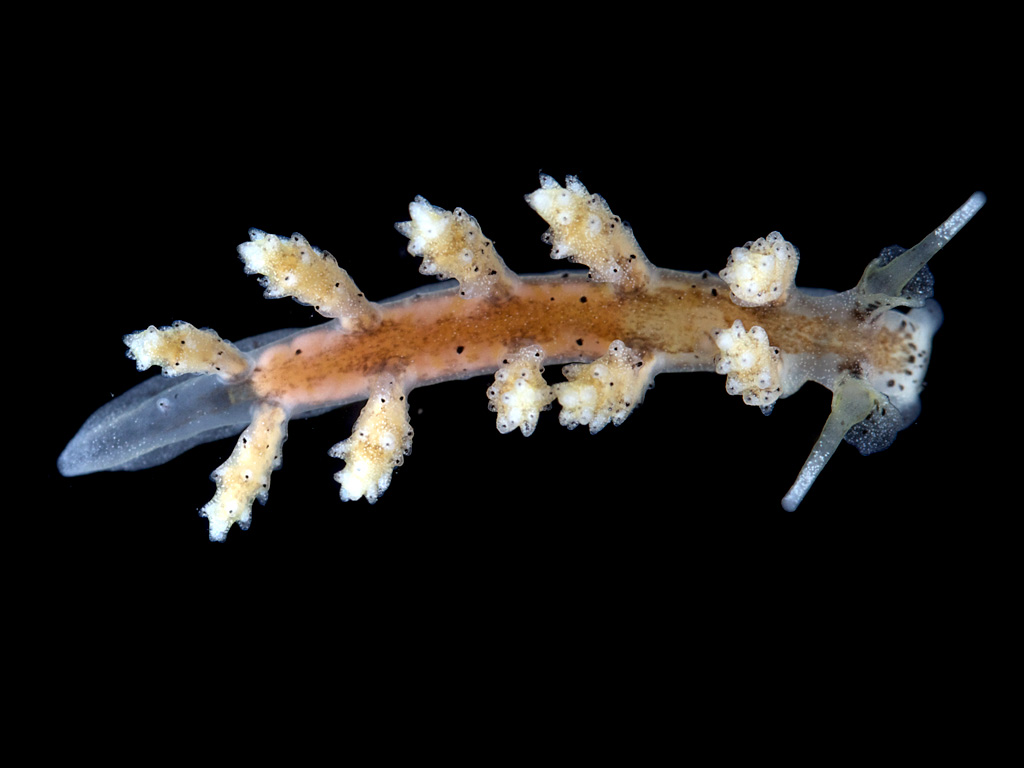
- The nudibranch Doto tuberculata, Firth of Lorne, Scotland

Scientific classification
- Kingdom: Animalia
- Phylum: Mollusca
- Class: Gastropoda
- Order: Nudibranchia
- Suborder: Dendronotacea
- Family: Dotidae
- Genus: Doto
- Species: D. tuberculata

Binomial name
- Doto tuberculata Lemche, 1976

= Doto tuberculata =

Species of gastropod

Doto tuberculata is a species of sea slug, a nudibranch, a marine gastropod mollusc in the family Dotidae.

== Distribution ==
The holotype for this species was collected in Killary Harbour, Ireland. The original description also cites specimens from the Mewstone and near the Eddystone Rocks, Plymouth, England, and Skird Rocks, Galway Bay. It has subsequently been reported widely in Britain and Ireland.

== Description ==
This nudibranch is pale brown with black spots on the ceratal tubercles. There are rows of tubercles tipped with black spots running across the body between the cerata; typically four tubercles in a row.

== Ecology ==
Doto tuberculata feeds on the hydroid Sertularella gayi, family Sertulariidae.
