= Doto paulinae =

Scientific classification
- Kingdom: Animalia
- Phylum: Mollusca
- Class: Gastropoda
- Order: Nudibranchia
- Suborder: Dendronotacea
- Family: Dotidae
- Genus: Doto
- Species: D. paulinae

Binomial name
- Doto paulinae Trinchese, 1881

Species of gastropod

Doto paulinae is a species of sea slug, a nudibranch, a marine gastropod mollusc in the family Dotidae.

== Distribution ==
This species was described from Genova, Italy in the Mediterranean Sea.

== Description ==
The body of this nudibranch is mostly transparent white in colour with cream coloured organs showing through the skin. There is a band of dark pigment along the midline of the back and extending into the inner surfaces of the rhinophore sheaths and a similar area of dark pigment on the inner faces of the cerata. Each ceratal tubercle is covered with a dark pigment patch, except for the elongate terminal tubercle which is transparent, showing white glandular bodies concentrated below the surface.

== Ecology ==
Doto paulinae has been reported to feed on colonies of the hydroid, Obelia geniculata (family Campanulariidae). Recent finds in France were of animals matching Trinchese's description but feeding on Aglaophenia.
