= Doto awapa =

Scientific classification
- Kingdom: Animalia
- Phylum: Mollusca
- Class: Gastropoda
- Order: Nudibranchia
- Suborder: Dendronotacea
- Family: Dotidae
- Genus: Doto
- Species: D. awapa

Binomial name
- Doto awapa Ortea, 2001

Species of gastropod

Doto awapa is a species of sea slug, a nudibranch, a marine gastropod mollusc in the family Dotidae.

== Distribution ==
This species was described from the Caribbean coast of Costa Rica.

== Description ==
This nudibranch is transparent white with a diffuse, sub-epidermal layer of brown pigment which is concentrated into a line down the middle of the back. White spots or glands are scattered all over the body and concentrated in areas at the tips of the ceratal tubercles and other protrusions.

== Ecology ==
Doto awapa was found on a colony of the hydroid, Aglaophenia sp. (family Aglaopheniidae) on which it presumably feeds. Many other species of Doto also feed on hydroids of the family Aglaopheniidae and the other families in the superfamily Plumularioidea.
