= Doto xangada =

Scientific classification
- Kingdom: Animalia
- Phylum: Mollusca
- Class: Gastropoda
- Order: Nudibranchia
- Suborder: Dendronotacea
- Family: Dotidae
- Genus: Doto
- Species: D. xangada

Binomial name
- Doto xangada Ortea, 2010

Species of gastropod

Doto xangada is a species of sea slug, a nudibranch, a marine gastropod mollusc in the family Dotidae.

== Distribution ==
This species was first described from four specimens collected at Caleta James, Santiago, Galapagos Islands.

== Description ==
This nudibranch is white with pink purple to reddish brown digestive gland showing through the skin. The cerata have large globular tubercles which are white.

== Ecology ==
Doto xangada was found associated with small thecate hydroids at low water mark.
