= Doto affinis =

Scientific classification
- Kingdom: Animalia
- Phylum: Mollusca
- Class: Gastropoda
- Order: Nudibranchia
- Suborder: Dendronotacea
- Family: Dotidae
- Genus: Doto
- Species: D. affinis

Binomial name
- Doto affinis d'Orbigny, 1837

Species of gastropod

Doto affinis is a species of sea slug, a nudibranch, a marine gastropod mollusc in the family Dotidae.

== Distribution ==
This species was described from La Rochelle, France.

== Description ==
Doto affinis is described and illustrated as an animal with rhinophores in sheaths like other Doto species but with smooth cerata capped with white, resembling an aeolid. It is said to be similar to Doto coronata and found in similar places.

== Ecology ==
Doto affinis is a species which has not been recognised by recent authors.
