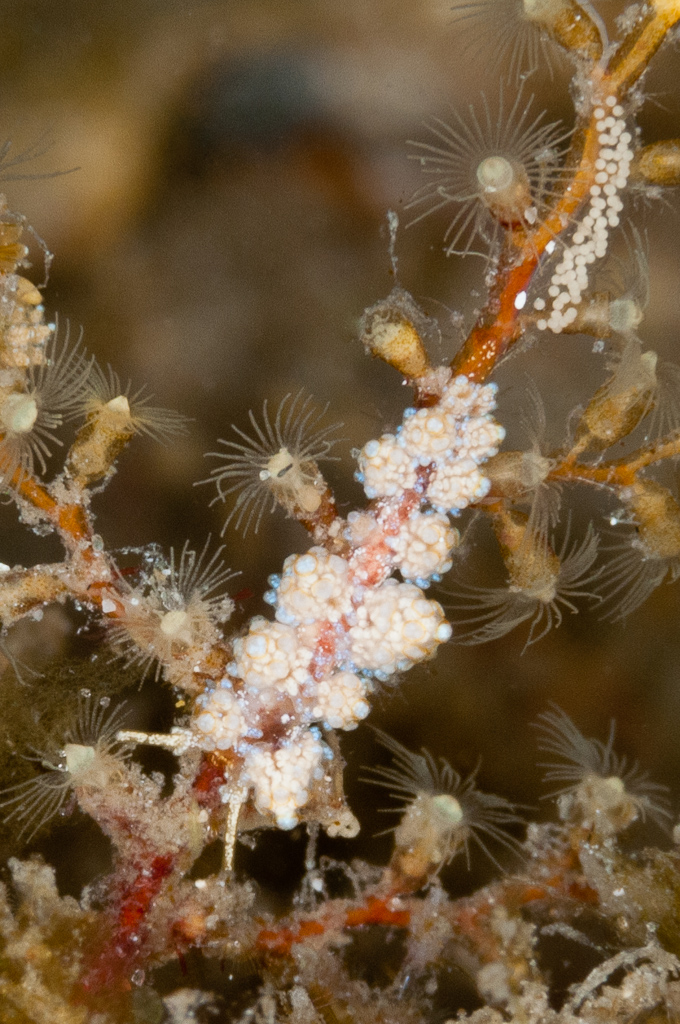
- Doto varaderoensis with spawn

Scientific classification
- Kingdom: Animalia
- Phylum: Mollusca
- Class: Gastropoda
- Order: Nudibranchia
- Suborder: Dendronotacea
- Family: Dotidae
- Genus: Doto; Oken, 1815

Type species
- Doris coronata Gmelin, 1791

Synonyms
- Dotilla Bergh, 1879 (invalid: junior homonym of Dotilla Stimpson, 1858; Iduliella is a replacement name); Dotona Iredale, 1918 (invalid: junior homonym of Dotona Carter, 1880); Gellina Gray, 1850; Idalia Gray, 1847; Idulia Leach, 1852; Iduliella Thiele, 1931; Timorella Bergh, 1905

= Doto (gastropod) =

Genus of gastropods

Doto is a genus of sea slug, a nudibranch in the family Dotidae. This genus feeds on hydroids, as reflected by its serrated radula.

Oken's 1815 Lehrbuch der Naturgeschichte has been placed by ICZN Opinion 417 on the Official Index of Rejected and Invalid Works in Zoology, but an exception was made for Doto which has been placed by ICZN Opinion 697 on the Official List of Generic Names.

== Species ==
Species within the genus Doto include:

- Doto acuta Schmekel & Kress, 1977
- Doto affinis (d'Orbigny, 1837)
- Doto africana Eliot, 1905
- Doto africoronata Shipman & Gosliner, 2015
- Doto albida Baba, 1955
- Doto alidrisi Ortea, Moro & Ocaña, 2010
- Doto amyra Er. Marcus, 1961 - hammerhead doto
- Doto annuligera Bergh, 1905
- Doto antarctica Eliot, 1907
- Doto apiculata Odhner, 1936
- Doto arteoi Ortea, 1978
- Doto awapa Ortea, 2001
- Doto bella Baba, 1938
- Doto caballa Ortea, Moro & Bacallado, 2010
- Doto cabecar Ortea, 2001
- Doto caramella Er. Marcus, 1957
- Doto carinova Moles, Avila & Wägele, 2016
- Doto casandra Ortea, 2013
- Doto cerasi Ortea & Moro, 1998
- Doto cervicenigra Ortea & Bouchet, 1989
- Doto chica Ev. Marcus and Er. Marcus, 1960
- Doto cindyneutes Bouchet, 1977
- Doto columbiana O'Donoghue, 1921 - British Columbia doto
- Doto confluens Hesse, 1872
- Doto coronata (Gmelin, 1791) - type species
- Doto crassicornis M. Sars, 1870
- Doto cristal Ortea, 2010
- Doto curere Ortea, 2001
- Doto cuspidata Alder & Hancock, 1862
- Doto divae Ev. Marcus and Er. Marcus, 1960
- Doto duao Ortea, 2001
- Doto dunnei Lemche, 1976
- Doto eireana Lemche, 1976
- Doto ensifer Mørch, 1859
- Doto eo Ortea & Moro, 2014
- Doto escatllari Ortea, Moro & Espinosa, 1998
- Doto floridicola Simroth, 1888
- Doto fluctifraga Ortea & Perez, 1982
- Doto formosa A. E. Verrill, 1875
- Doto fragaria Ortea & Bouchet, 1989
- Doto fragilis (Forbes, 1838)
- Doto furva Garcia J.C. & Ortea, 1984
- Doto galapagoensis Ortea, 2010
- Doto greenamyeri Shipman & Gosliner, 2015
- Doto hydrallmaniae Morrow, Thorpe and Picton, 1992
- Doto hystrix Picton and Brown, 1981
- Doto indica Bergh, 1888
- Doto iugula Ortea, 2001
- Doto japonica Odhner, 1936
- Doto kekoldi Ortea, 2001
- Doto koenneckeri Lemche, 1976
- Doto kwakwak Gosliner & Adayapalam, 2025
- Doto kya Er. Marcus, 1961 - dark doto
- Doto lancei Ev. Marcus and Er. Marcus, 1967
- Doto lemchei Ortea and Urgorri, 1978
- Doto leopardina Vicente, 1967
- Doto maculata (Montagu, 1804)
- Doto millbayana Lemche, 1976
- Doto moravesa Ortea, 1997
- Doto nigromaculata Eliot, 1906
- Doto oblicua Ortea & Urgorri, 1978
- Doto obscura Eliot, 1906
- Doto onusta Hesse, 1872: (dubious) synonym of Doto floridicola Simroth, 1888
- Doto orcha Yonow, 2000
- Doto oscura Eliot, 1906
- Doto ostenta Burn, 1958
- Doto paulinae Trinchese, 1881
- Doto pinnatifida (Montagu, 1804)
- Doto pita Marcus, 1955
- Doto pontica Swennen, 1961
- Doto proranao Ortea, 2001
- Doto purpurea Baba, 1949
- Doto pygmaea (Bergh, 1871)
- Doto racemosa Risbec, 1928
- Doto rosacea Baba, 1949
- Doto rosea Trinchese, 1881
- Doto sabuli Ortea, 2001
- Doto sarsiae Morrow, Thorpe and Picton, 1992
- Doto sotilloi (Ortea, Moro & Espinosa, 1998)
- Doto splendidissima Pola & Gosliner, 2015
- Doto torrelavega Ortea & Caballer, 2007
- Doto tuberculata Lemche, 1976
- Doto unguis Ortea & Rodriguez, 1989
- Doto urak Gosliner & Adayapalam, 2025
- Doto ussi Ortea, 1982
- Doto uva Er. Marcus, 1955
- Doto varaderoensis Ortea, 2001
- Doto verdicioi Ortea & Urgorri, 1978
- Doto wildei Er. Marcus & Ev. Marcus, 1970
- Doto xangada Ortea, 2010
- Doto yongei Thompson, 1972

Species brought into synonymy

- Doto armoricana Hesse, 1872: synonym of Doto pinnatifida (Montagu, 1804)
- Doto aurea Trinchese, 1881: synonym of Doto rosea Trinchese, 1881
- Doto aurita Hesse, 1872: synonym of Doto fragilis (Forbes, 1838)
- Doto aurita Hesse, 1872: synonym of Doto rosea Trinchese, 1881
- Doto cinerea Trinchese, 1881: synonym of Doto rosea Trinchese, 1881
- Doto cornaliae Trinchese, 1881: synonym of Doto cuspidata Alder & Hancock, 1862
- Doto costae Trinchese, 1881: synonym of Doto coronata (Gmelin, 1791)
- Doto doerga Ev. Marcus and Er. Marcus, 1963: synonym of Doto pygmaea (Bergh, 1871)
- Doto forbesii Deshayes, 1853: synonym of Doto coronata (Gmelin, 1791)
- Doto ganda Er. Marcus, 1961: synonym of Doto amyra Er. Marcus, 1961
- Doto nigra Eliot, 1910: synonym of Doto pinnatifida (Montagu, 1804)
- Doto ocellifera Simroth, 1895: synonym of Costasiella ocellifera (Simroth, 1895)
- Doto pinnigera Hesse, 1872: synonym of Doto fragilis (Forbes, 1838)
- Doto splendida Trinchese, 1881: synonym of Doto coronata (Gmelin, 1791)
- Doto splendida Pola & Gosliner, 2015: synonym of Doto splendidissima Pola & Gosliner, 2015
- Doto styligera Hesse, 1872: synonym of Doto paulinae Trinchese, 1881
- Doto susanae Fez, 1962: synonym of Doto floridicola Simroth, 1888
- Doto umia Ev. Marcus & Er. Marcus, 1969: synonym of Doto chica Ev. Marcus & Er. Marcus, 1960
- Doto uncinata Hesse, 1872: synonym of Hancockia uncinata (Hesse, 1872)
- Doto varians MacFarland, 1966: synonym of Doto kya Er. Marcus, 1961
- Doto wara Er. Marcus, 1961: synonym of Doto amyra Er. Marcus, 1961
