= Doto africana =

Scientific classification
- Kingdom: Animalia
- Phylum: Mollusca
- Class: Gastropoda
- Order: Nudibranchia
- Suborder: Dendronotacea
- Family: Dotidae
- Genus: Doto
- Species: D. africana

Binomial name
- Doto africana Eliot, 1905

Species of gastropod

Doto africana is a species of sea slug, a nudibranch, a marine gastropod mollusc in the family Dotidae.

== Distribution ==
This species was described from Chuaka, Mkoani, Pemba, Tanzania, Africa.

== Description ==
The size of the body attains 15 mm.
