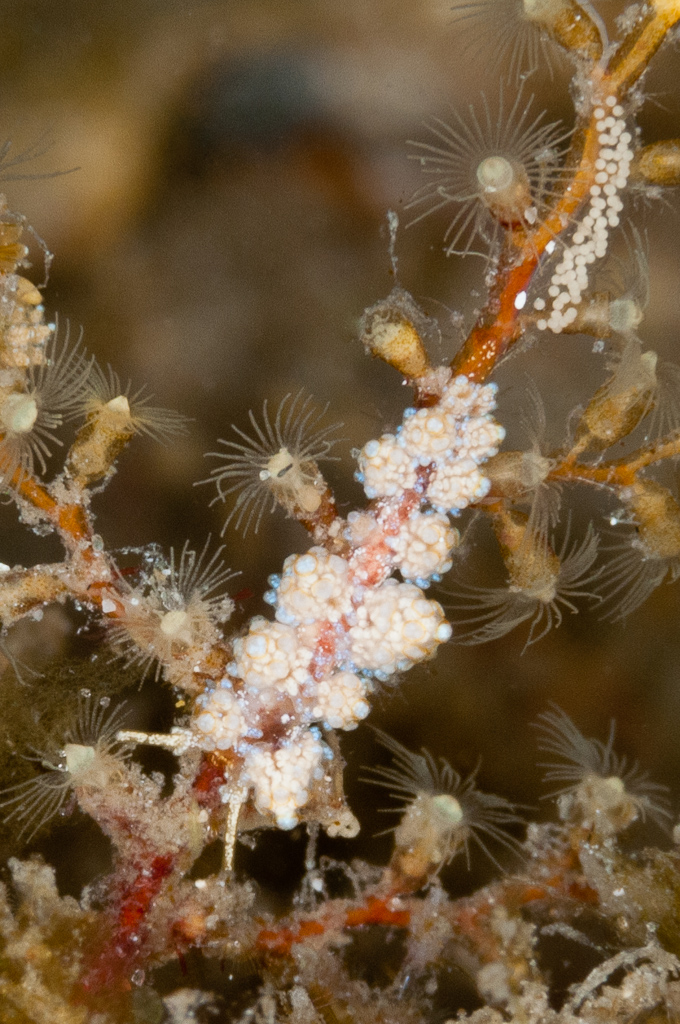
- Doto varaderoensis with spawn

Scientific classification
- Kingdom: Animalia
- Phylum: Mollusca
- Class: Gastropoda
- Order: Nudibranchia
- Suborder: Dendronotacea
- Family: Dotidae
- Genus: Doto
- Species: D. varaderoensis

Binomial name
- Doto varaderoensis Ortea, 2001

= Doto varaderoensis =

Species of gastropod

Doto varaderoensis is a species of sea slug, a nudibranch, a marine gastropod mollusc in the family Dotidae.

== Distribution ==
This species was described from Playa de Varadero, Cuba. It has also been reported from Puerto Rico and Lake Worth Lagoon, Florida.

== Description ==
The body of this nudibranch is translucent brown in colour. The cerata have numerous tubercles which are swollen and globular in appearance.

The maximum recorded body length is 10 mm.

== Ecology ==
Minimum recorded depth is 1 m. Maximum recorded depth is 5 m.

Doto varaderoensis was found associated with the hydroids Thyroscyphus sp. in the family Sertulariidae.

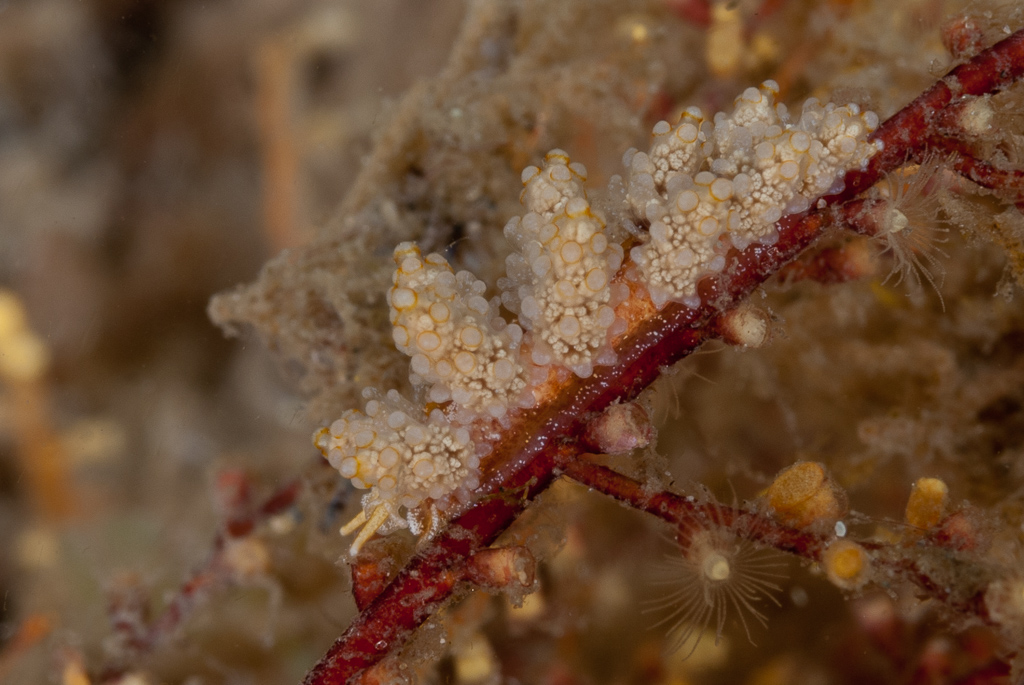
Doto varaderoensis on hydroids.

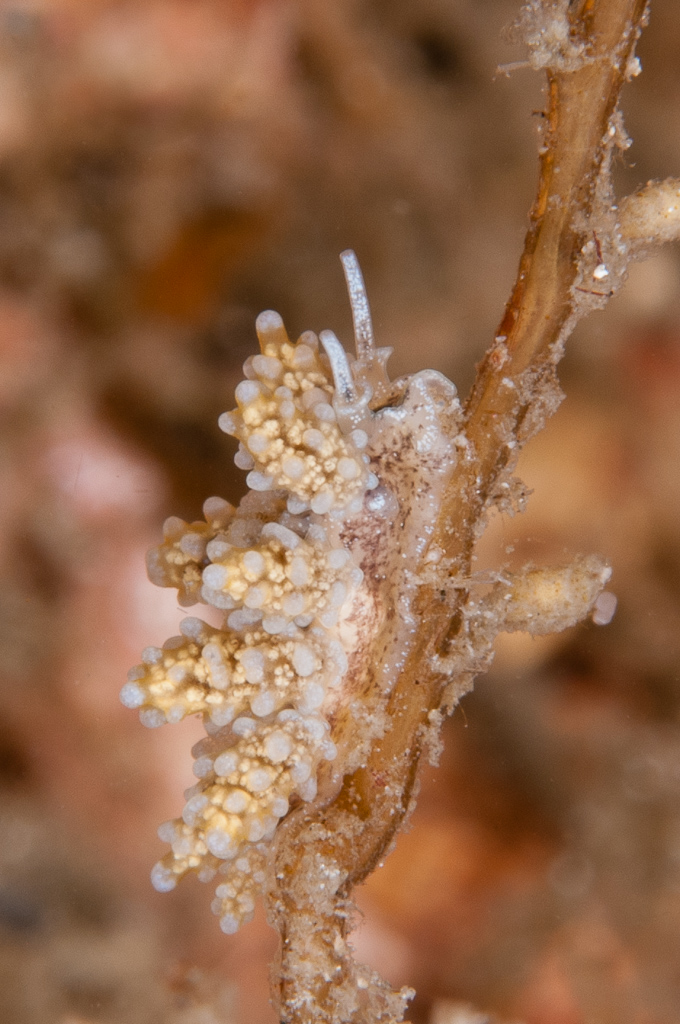
Doto varaderoensis on hydroids.
