= Doto iugula =

Scientific classification
- Kingdom: Animalia
- Phylum: Mollusca
- Class: Gastropoda
- Order: Nudibranchia
- Suborder: Dendronotacea
- Family: Dotidae
- Genus: Doto
- Species: D. iugula

Binomial name
- Doto iugula Ortea, 2001

Species of gastropod

Doto iugula is a species of sea slug, a nudibranch, a marine gastropod mollusc in the family Dotidae.

== Distribution ==
This species was described from Manzanillo on the Caribbean coast of Costa Rica.

== Description ==
This nudibranch is very transparent, crystalline, with a medio-dorsal band of irregular orange spots. The cerata are transparent and the ceratal tubercles have no dark spots. The cerata have a conspicuous, orange, irregular patch near the apex. There are no pseudobranchs but just a few irregular tubercles on the inner faces of the cerata.

== Ecology ==
Doto iugula was not found associated with any food source.
