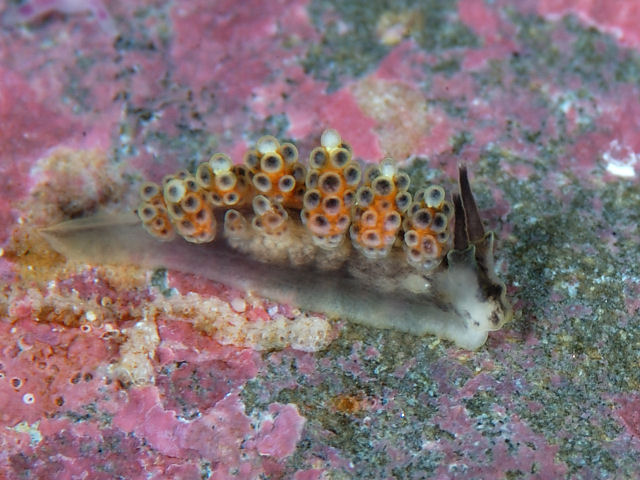
- Right side view of Doto bella

Scientific classification
- Kingdom: Animalia
- Phylum: Mollusca
- Class: Gastropoda
- Order: Nudibranchia
- Suborder: Dendronotacea
- Family: Dotidae
- Genus: Doto
- Species: D. bella

Binomial name
- Doto bella Baba, 1938

= Doto bella =

Species of gastropod

Doto bella is a species of sea slug, a nudibranch, a marine gastropod mollusc in the family Dotidae.

== Distribution ==
This species was described from the Izu Peninsula, Japan. It is widely distributed on the Pacific Ocean coasts of Japan and the Japan Sea coasts. A species from Indonesia has previously been identified as Doto bella but is now thought to be an undescribed species.

== Description ==
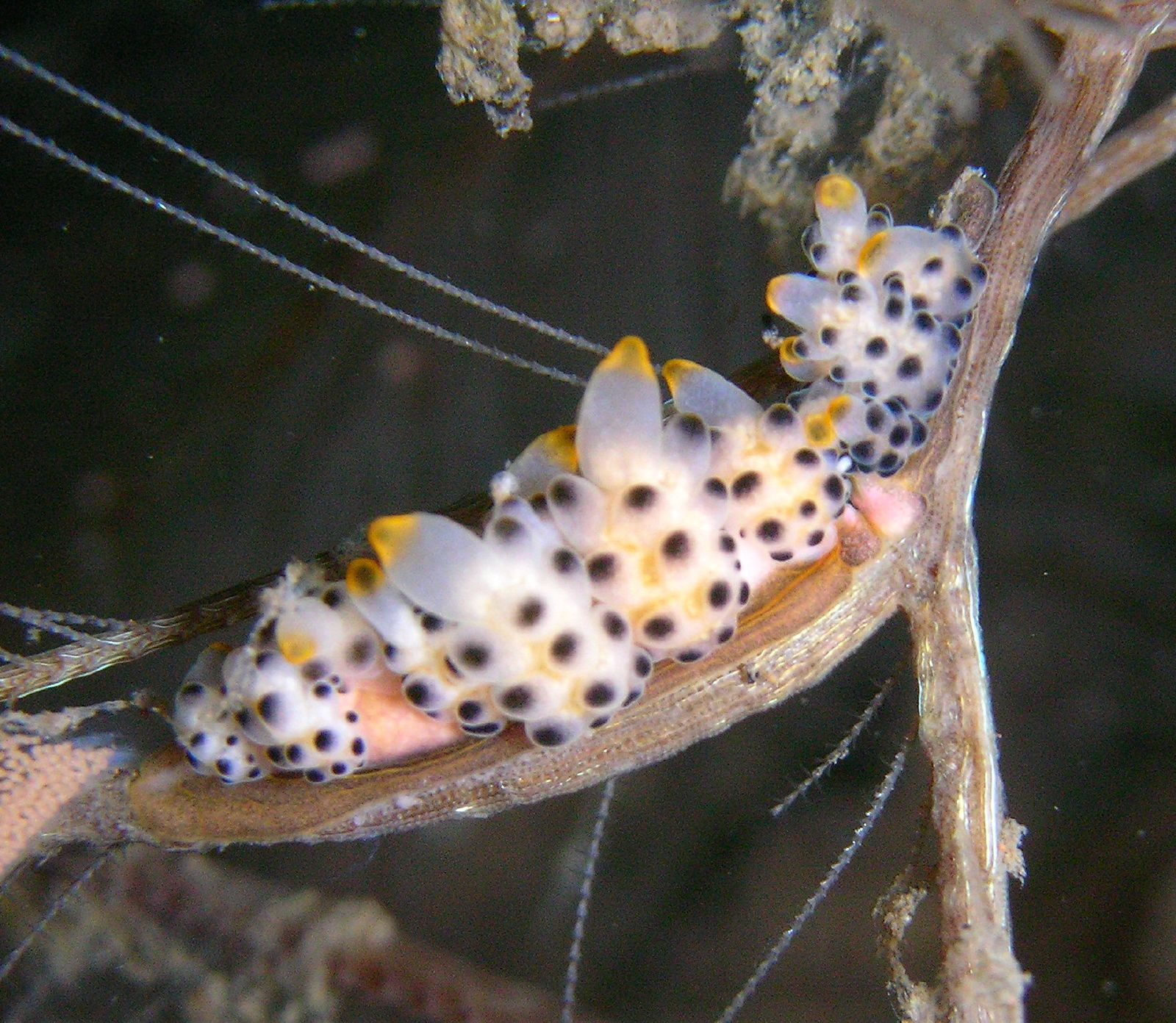
Doto cf. bella from Indonesia

This nudibranch is transparent white with a diffuse, sub-epidermal layer of black pigment which is faint in some specimens and very dense in others. The ceratal tubercles are slightly stalked with globular tips which have a large black spot which is partly obscured by white glands in the terminal tubercle. The digestive gland is usually yellow. The outer half of the rhinophores is black.

== Ecology ==
Doto bella has been photographed on a colony of a hydroid, probably in the family Aglaopheniidae on which it presumably feeds.
