= Doto rosacea =

Scientific classification
- Kingdom: Animalia
- Phylum: Mollusca
- Class: Gastropoda
- Order: Nudibranchia
- Suborder: Dendronotacea
- Family: Dotidae
- Genus: Doto
- Species: D. rosacea

Binomial name
- Doto rosacea Baba, 1949

Species of gastropod

Doto rosacea is a species of sea slug, a nudibranch, a marine gastropod mollusc in the family Dotidae.

== Distribution ==
This species was described from Sagami Bay, Japan.

== Description ==
The body of this nudibranch is mottled with rose-pink on a pale pink background with clusters of white dots along the middle of the back. The cerata have elongate tubercles and are also rose-pink in colour.

== Ecology ==
Doto rosacea feeds on a hydroid, probably family Aglaopheniidae.
