= Doto kekoldi =

Scientific classification
- Kingdom: Animalia
- Phylum: Mollusca
- Class: Gastropoda
- Order: Nudibranchia
- Suborder: Dendronotacea
- Family: Dotidae
- Genus: Doto
- Species: D. kekoldi

Binomial name
- Doto kekoldi Ortea, 2001

Species of gastropod

Doto kekoldi is a species of sea slug, a nudibranch, a marine gastropod mollusc in the family Dotidae.

== Distribution ==
This species was described from the eastern or Caribbean Sea coast of Costa Rica.

== Description ==
The body of this nudibranch is black with paler grey areas at the base of the cerata. The cerata are very irregular in shape. There are well-developed pseudobranchs arising from the inner faces of the cerata.

The maximum recorded body length is 12 mm.

== Ecology ==
Minimum recorded depth is 9 m. Maximum recorded depth is 9 m.

Doto kekoldi is found associated with the hydroid Eudendrium sp. which is presumably its prey.
