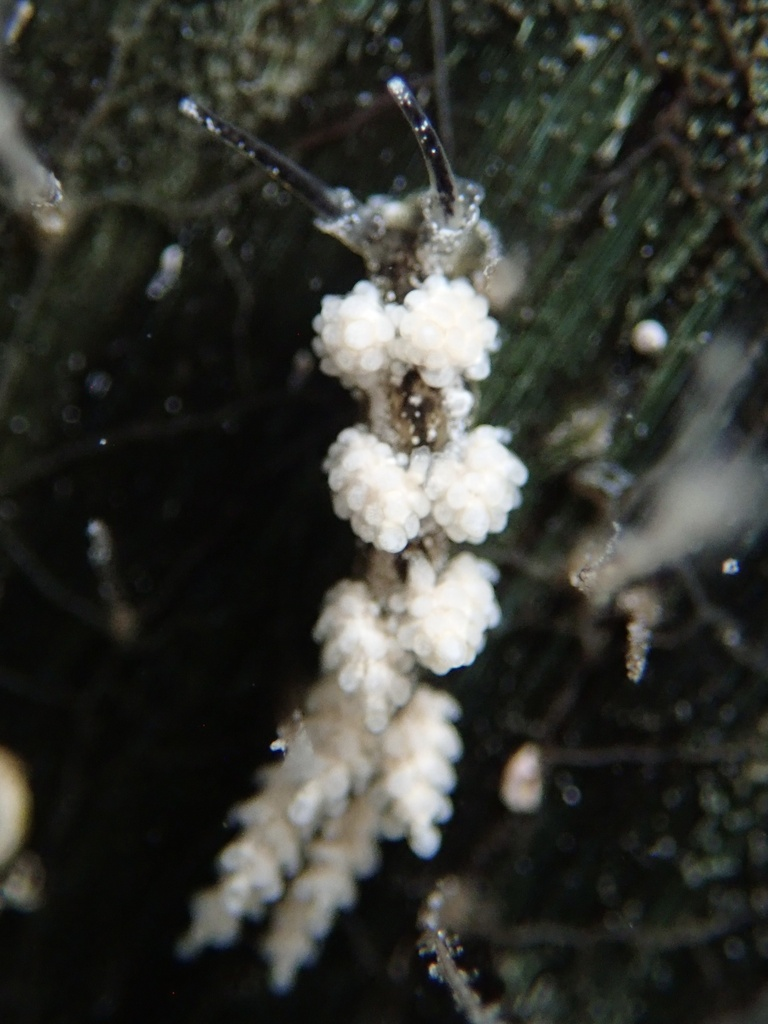

Scientific classification
- Kingdom: Animalia
- Phylum: Mollusca
- Class: Gastropoda
- Order: Nudibranchia
- Suborder: Dendronotacea
- Family: Dotidae
- Genus: Doto
- Species: D. curere

Binomial name
- Doto curere Ortea, 2001

= Doto curere =

Species of gastropod

Doto curere is a species of sea slug, a nudibranch, a marine gastropod mollusc in the family Dotidae.

== Distribution ==
This species was described from the Caribbean coast of Costa Rica.

== Description ==
This nudibranch is translucent grey in colour. The cerata have rather pointed tubercles without terminal spots.

== Ecology ==
Doto curere was found on rocky reefs with an abundance of hydroids. The specific food for this species is unknown.
