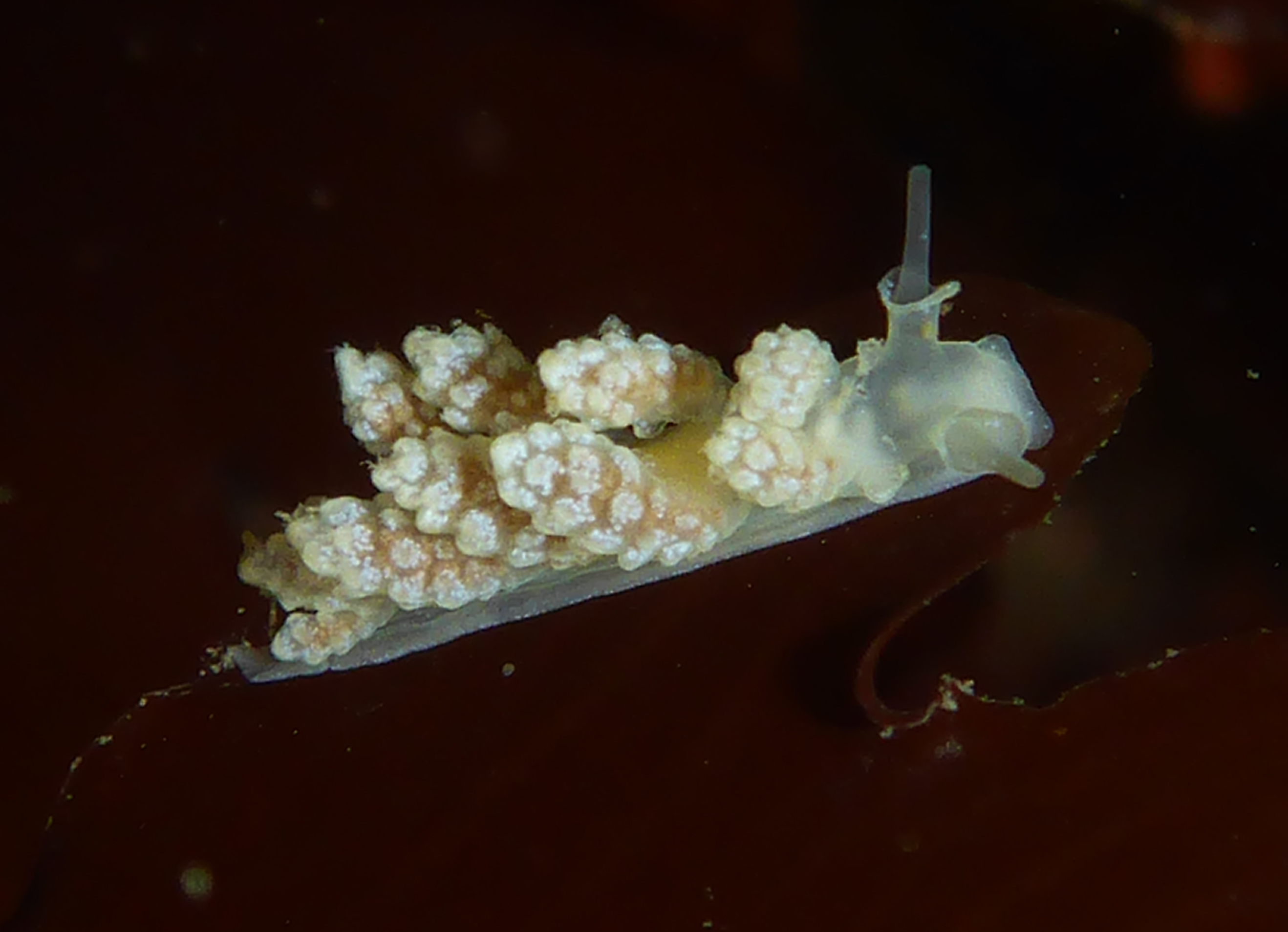
- Doto amyra from Pillar Point, CA

Scientific classification
- Kingdom: Animalia
- Phylum: Mollusca
- Class: Gastropoda
- Order: Nudibranchia
- Suborder: Dendronotacea
- Family: Dotidae
- Genus: Doto
- Species: D. amyra

Binomial name
- Doto amyra Marcus, 1961

= Doto amyra =

Species of gastropod

Doto amyra, or the hammerhead doto, is a species of very small or minute sea slug, a nudibranch, a shell-less marine gastropod mollusk in the family Dotidae.

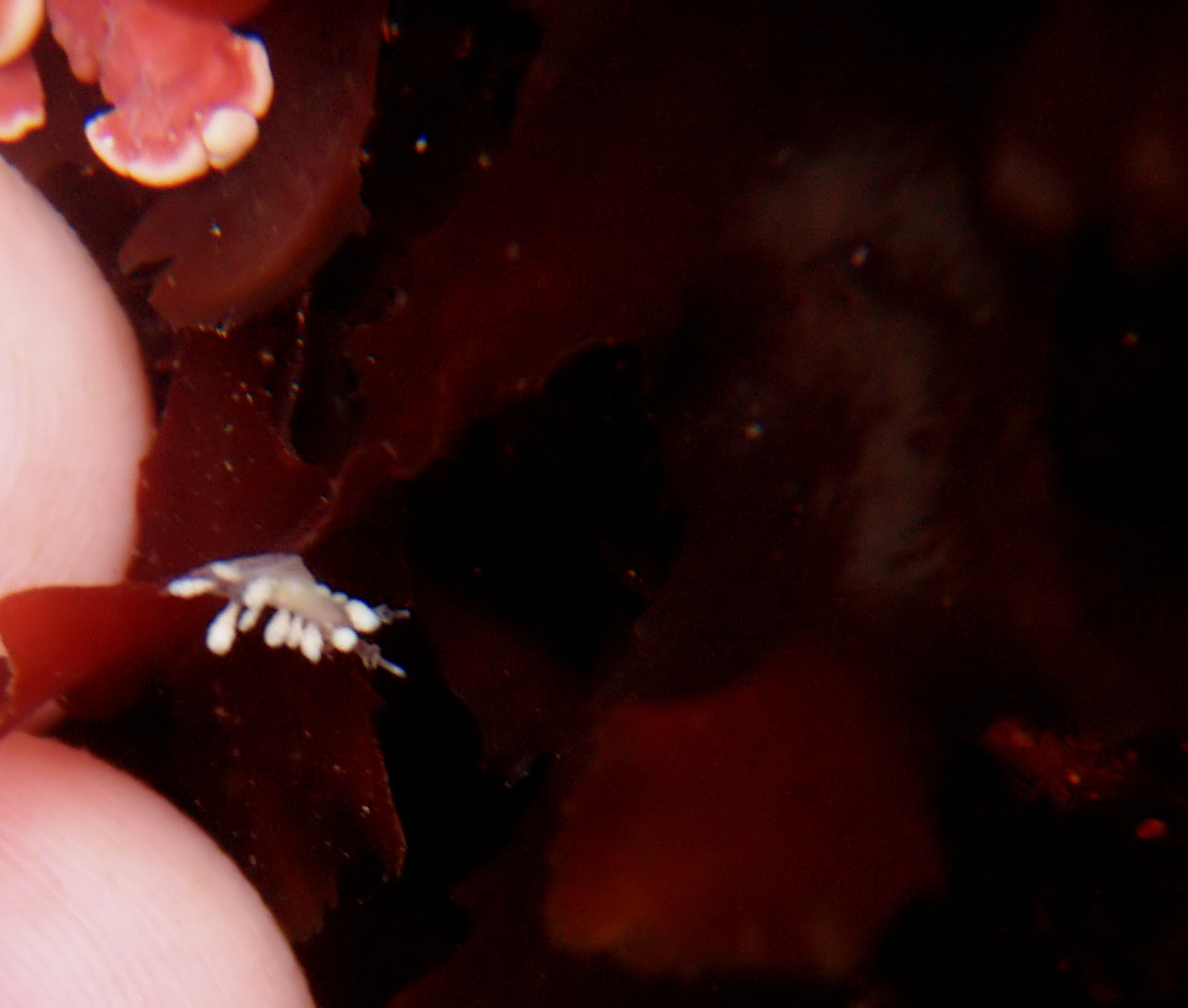
Doto amyra in a tide pool in Central California. The photographer's fingertips on the left give an indication of the minute size of this specimen.

== Distribution ==
This species occurs from Alaska to Baja California, Mexico.

== Description ==
This nudibranch reaches a maximum size of 14 mm, but commonly it is under 10 mm in adult size.

The body is colourless, but the cerata are coloured due to the digestive glands inside them. The colour of the digestive gland can be creamy yellow to orange-red to brown, depending on the colour of the hydroids that an individual specimen has been eating. Compared with Doto kya and Doto columbiana this species lacks any dark pigment on the body.

== Ecology ==
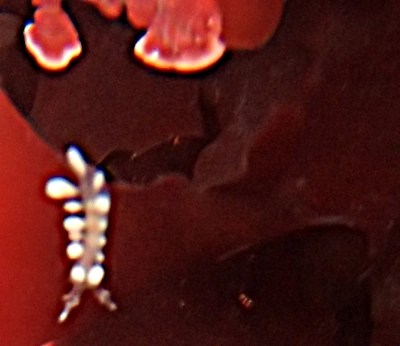

This nudibranch feeds on hydroids. It has been reported apparently feeding on a variety of species including Garveia sp., Bougainvilliidae, Abietinaria spp., Sertulariidae as well as a plumulariid hydroid. This may be evidence of a species complex rather than a single species. It in unusual in having a form of development where the eggs are large compared with most Doto species and therefore larvae which settle after only a few days in the plankton.
