= Doto rosea =

Scientific classification
- Kingdom: Animalia
- Phylum: Mollusca
- Class: Gastropoda
- Order: Nudibranchia
- Suborder: Dendronotacea
- Family: Dotidae
- Genus: Doto
- Species: D. rosea

Binomial name
- Doto rosea Trinchese, 1881

Species of gastropod

Doto rosea is a species of sea slug, a nudibranch, a marine gastropod mollusc in the family Dotidae.

== Distribution ==
This species was described from Genova, Italy, Mediterranean Sea.

== Description ==
The body of this nudibranch is mostly transparent whitish in colour with brown or black dots forming a marbled pattern on the back and sides. There is a conspicuous black mark in the base of each ceras. The ceratal tubercles are slightly swollen and globular and the digestive gland is pink.

== Ecology ==
Doto rosea has been reported to feed on colonies of the hydroid, Eudendrium sp. (family Eudendriidae).
