= Doto orcha =

Scientific classification
- Kingdom: Animalia
- Phylum: Mollusca
- Class: Gastropoda
- Order: Nudibranchia
- Suborder: Dendronotacea
- Family: Dotidae
- Genus: Doto
- Species: D. orcha

Binomial name
- Doto orcha Yonow, 2000

Species of gastropod

Doto orcha is a species of sea slug, a nudibranch, a marine gastropod mollusc in the family Dotidae.

== Distribution ==
This species was first described from the Gulf of Aqaba, Red Sea.

== Description ==
This nudibranch is very elongate with paired cerata which are widely spaced down the length of the body.

== Ecology ==
Doto orcha feeds on the hydroid Dynamena disticha.
