= Doto furva =

Scientific classification
- Kingdom: Animalia
- Phylum: Mollusca
- Class: Gastropoda
- Order: Nudibranchia
- Suborder: Dendronotacea
- Family: Dotidae
- Genus: Doto
- Species: D. furva

Binomial name
- Doto furva Garcia J. C. & Ortea, 1984

Species of gastropod

Doto furva is a species of sea slug, a nudibranch, a marine gastropod mollusc in the family Dotidae.

== Distribution ==
This species is known from Tarifa and Ceuta, on both sides of the Strait of Gibraltar, at the entrance to the Mediterranean Sea.

== Description ==
The body of this nudibranch is mostly translucent white in colour, with yellow ovotestis showing through the middle of the body in mature animals. The ceratal tubercles are capped with black, giving a very characteristic appearance.

== Ecology ==
Doto furva feeds on the hydroid Sertularella cylindritheca, family Sertulariidae.
