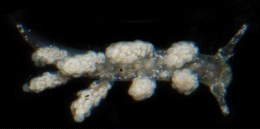
- Doto cf. wildei

Scientific classification
- Kingdom: Animalia
- Phylum: Mollusca
- Class: Gastropoda
- Order: Nudibranchia
- Suborder: Dendronotacea
- Family: Dotidae
- Genus: Doto
- Species: D. wildei

Binomial name
- Doto wildei Er. Marcus & Ev. Marcus, 1970

Synonyms
- Doto caramella wildei Er. Marcus & Ev. Marcus, 1970

= Doto wildei =

Species of gastropod

Doto wildei is a species of sea slug, a nudibranch, a marine gastropod mollusc in the family Dotidae.

== Distribution ==
Distribution of Doto wildei includes Curaçao and Panama (but the identification of this species in Panama is uncertain, because it lacks pseudogills on the cerata).

== Description ==
Body is narrow and elongate. Rhinophores are smooth with tight rhinophoral sheaths. Cerata are with rounded tubercles; apical tubercles are much larger than the rest. Cerata are spaced out along the dorsum. Background color is translucent gray with a series of opaque white spots on the dorsum. Cerata are with cream or white extensions of the digestive gland. The body size is up to 4 mm.

== Ecology ==
It was found on hydroids in Panama.
