= Doto cabecar =

Scientific classification
- Kingdom: Animalia
- Phylum: Mollusca
- Class: Gastropoda
- Order: Nudibranchia
- Suborder: Dendronotacea
- Family: Dotidae
- Genus: Doto
- Species: D. cabecar

Binomial name
- Doto cabecar Ortea, 2001

Species of gastropod

Doto cabecar is a species of sea slug, a nudibranch, a marine gastropod mollusc in the family Dotidae.

== Distribution ==
This species was described from the Caribbean coast of Costa Rica. It has subsequently been reported from the Virgin Islands and Puerto Rico.

== Description ==
This nudibranch is pale brown with yellow rhinophores and cerata. The ceratal tubercles bear dark spots, except for the terminal tubercle on each ceras, which has a concentration of internal white glands. Further details of this species are given in Ortea & Caballer, 2003.

The maximum recorded body length is 14 mm.

== Ecology ==
Minimum recorded depth is 20 m. Maximum recorded depth is 20 m.

Doto cabecar feeds on the hydroid, Thyroscyphus marginatus (family Sertulariidae).
