= Doto oblicua =

Scientific classification
- Kingdom: Animalia
- Phylum: Mollusca
- Class: Gastropoda
- Order: Nudibranchia
- Suborder: Dendronotacea
- Family: Dotidae
- Genus: Doto
- Species: D. oblicua

Binomial name
- Doto oblicua Ortea & Urgorri, 1978

Species of gastropod

Doto oblicua is a species of sea slug, a nudibranch, a marine gastropod mollusc in the family Dotidae.

== Distribution ==
This species was first described from Galicia, Spain.
