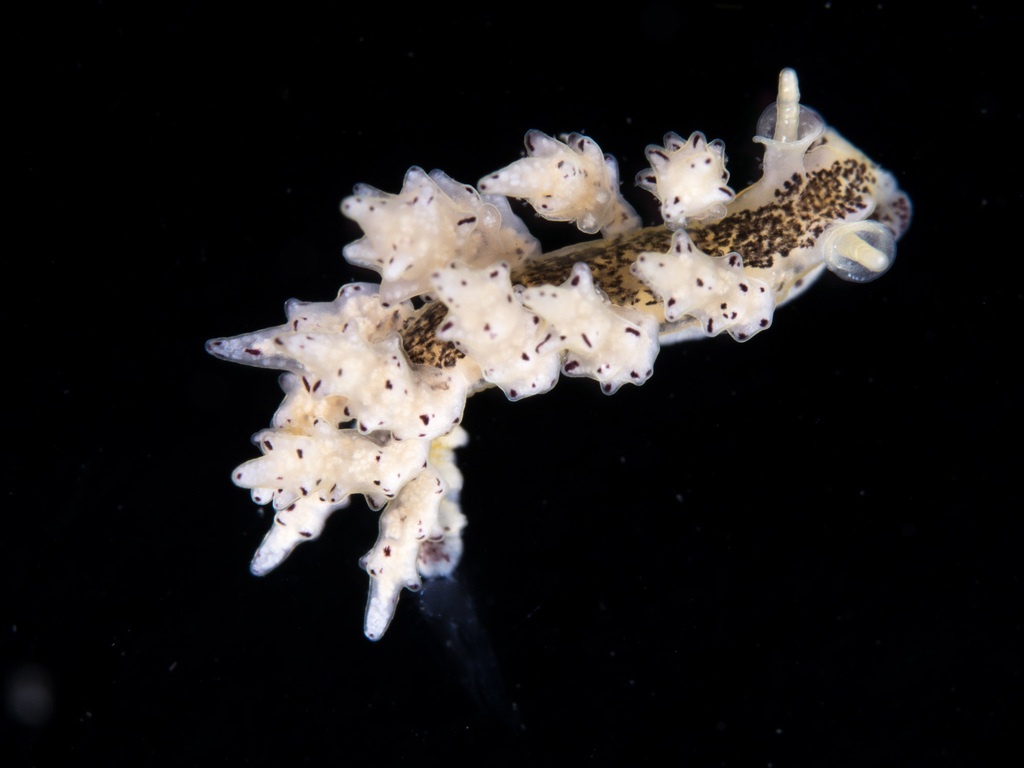

Scientific classification
- Kingdom: Animalia
- Phylum: Mollusca
- Class: Gastropoda
- Order: Nudibranchia
- Suborder: Dendronotacea
- Family: Dotidae
- Genus: Doto
- Species: D. koenneckeri

Binomial name
- Doto koenneckeri Lemche, 1976

= Doto koenneckeri =

Species of gastropod

Doto koenneckeri is a species of sea slug, a nudibranch, a marine gastropod mollusc belonging to the family Dotidae.

== Distribution ==
This species was first described from Galway Bay, Ireland. While a specimen from Hjeltefjord, Norway, is included in the original description, the depth and habitat (90–40 m, Lophelia-reef) of this record should be regarded with skepticism.

== Description ==
This nudibranch is white with brown surface pigmentation on the back and sides of the body. This pigmentation is absent along an irregular band connecting the ceratal bases.

== Ecology ==
Doto koenneckeri feeds on the hydroid Aglaophenia pluma, family Aglaopheniidae.
