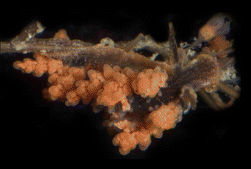
- Doto chica on substrate

Scientific classification
- Kingdom: Animalia
- Phylum: Mollusca
- Class: Gastropoda
- Order: Nudibranchia
- Suborder: Dendronotacea
- Family: Dotidae
- Genus: Doto
- Species: D. chica

Binomial name
- Doto chica Ev. Marcus & Er. Marcus, 1960

Synonyms
- Doto fragilis umia Ev. Marcus & Er. Marcus, 1969; Doto umia Ev. Marcus & Er. Marcus, 1969

= Doto chica =

Species of gastropod

Doto chica is a species of sea slug, a nudibranch, a marine gastropod mollusc in the family Dotidae.

== Distribution ==
Distribution of Doto chica includes Florida, Mexico, Costa Rica, Venezuela, Puerto Rico, Curaçao, Cuba, Brazil and Panama.

== Description ==
The body is narrow and elongate. Rhinophores are smooth and rhinophoral sheaths are with small posterior extensions. Cerata are large, with rounded tubercles; apical tubercles much larger than the rest. Background color is translucent gray with a dense series of dark brown spots and a less dense set of opaque white spots on the dorsum. Cerata are with orange extensions of the digestive gland. The maximum recorded body length is 5 mm or up to 10 mm.

== Ecology ==
Minimum recorded depth is 4 m. Maximum recorded depth is 4 m.

It can be found on hydroids. It is known to feed on hydroids of the genus Eudendrium.
