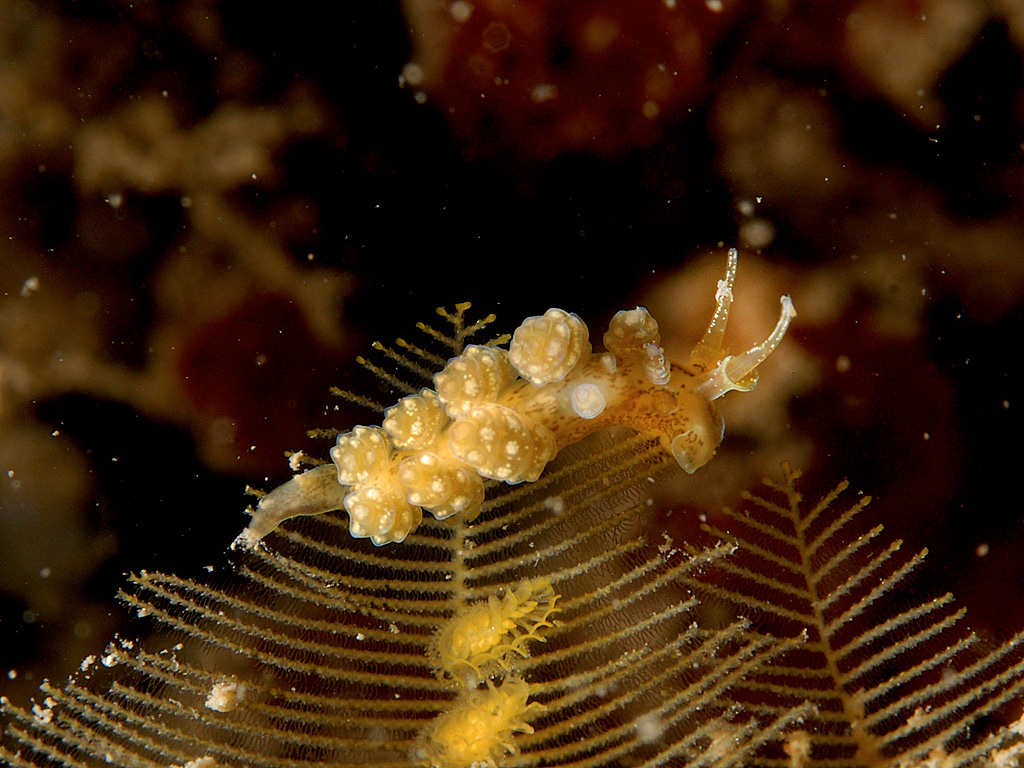
- The nudibranch Doto lemchei, Skomer Island, Pembrokeshire, Wales.

Scientific classification
- Kingdom: Animalia
- Phylum: Mollusca
- Class: Gastropoda
- Order: Nudibranchia
- Suborder: Dendronotacea
- Family: Dotidae
- Genus: Doto
- Species: D. lemchei

Binomial name
- Doto lemchei Ortea & Urgorri, 1978

= Doto lemchei =

Species of gastropod

Doto lemchei is a species of sea slug, a nudibranch, a marine gastropod mollusc in the family Dotidae.

== Distribution ==
This species was first described from Galicia, Spain. It was subsequently reported from Britain and Ireland.

== Description ==
This nudibranch is olive brown in colour with no dark spots on the ceratal tubercles. The tips of the tubercles appear pale or white due to white, internal, glandular cells.

== Ecology ==
Doto lemchei feeds on the hydroid Aglaophenia tuberculata, family Aglaopheniidae.
