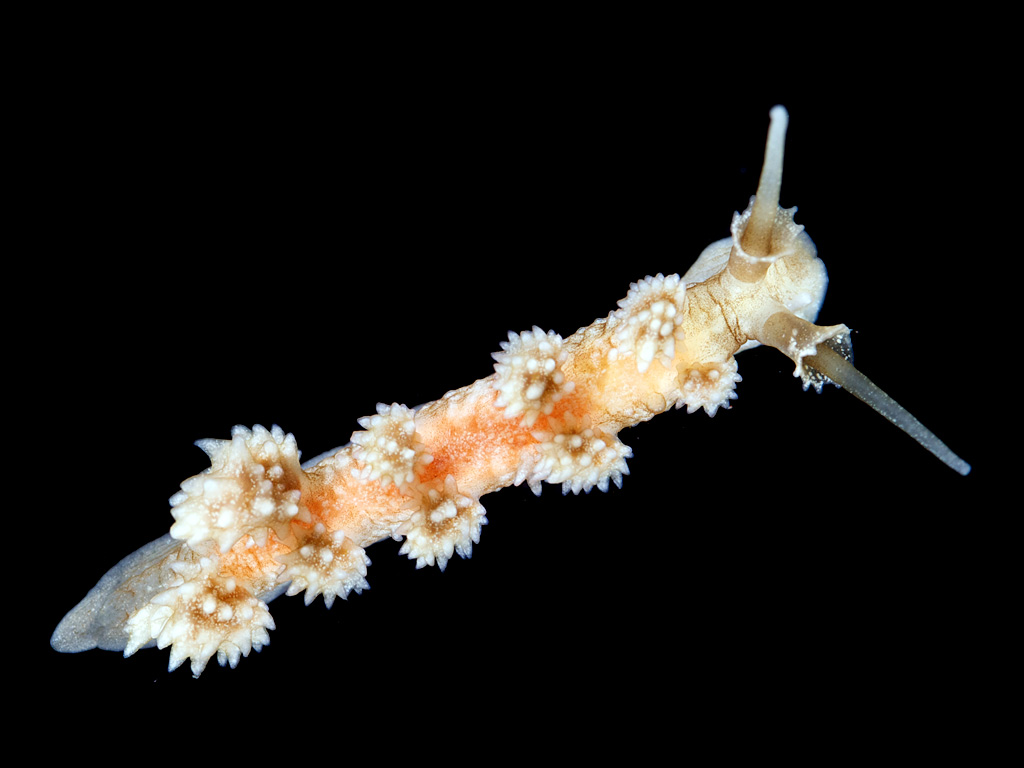
- The nudibranch Doto hystrix, Firth of Lorne, Scotland.

Scientific classification
- Kingdom: Animalia
- Phylum: Mollusca
- Class: Gastropoda
- Order: Nudibranchia
- Suborder: Dendronotacea
- Family: Dotidae
- Genus: Doto
- Species: D. hystrix

Binomial name
- Doto hystrix Picton & Brown, 1981

= Doto hystrix =

Species of gastropod

Doto hystrix is a species of sea slug, a nudibranch, a marine gastropod mollusc in the family Dotidae.

== Distribution ==
This species was first described from Sherkin Island, Ireland. Additional specimens from the Scilly Isles were included in the original description. It has subsequently been reported widely in Britain and Ireland, usually from water deeper than 20 metres.

== Description ==
This nudibranch is uniformly brown in colour with diffuse paler markings.

== Ecology ==
Doto hystrix feeds on the hydroid Schizotricha frutescens, family Halopterididae.
