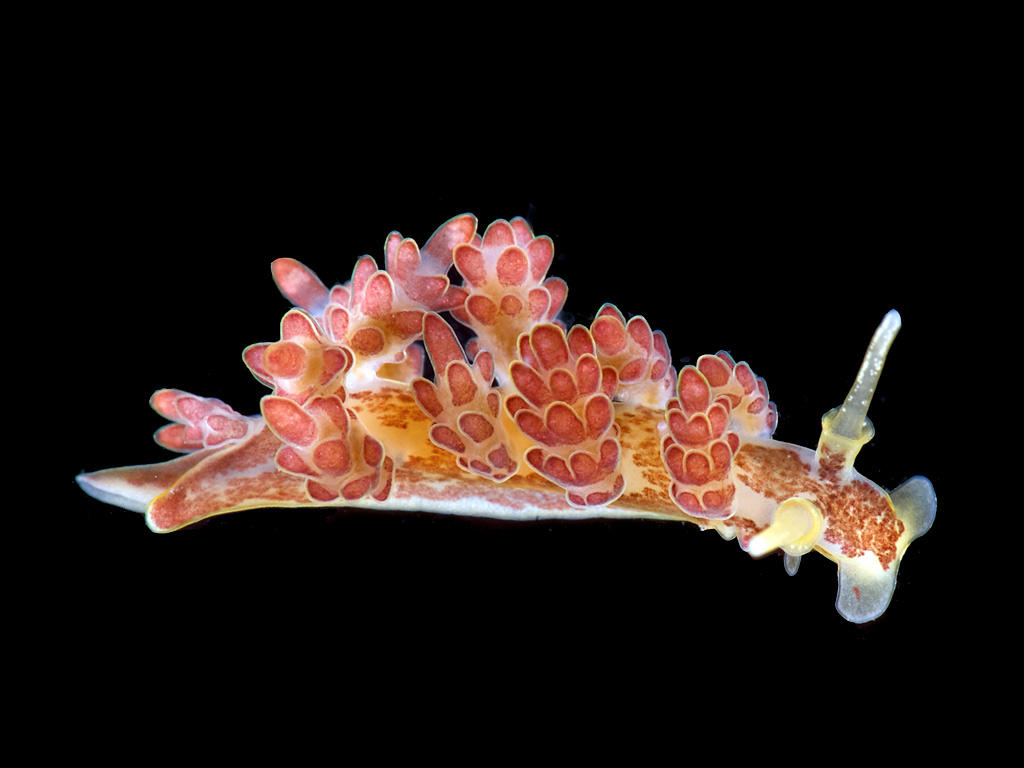
- The nudibranch Doto floridicola, Pembrokeshire, Wales, UK.

Scientific classification
- Kingdom: Animalia
- Phylum: Mollusca
- Class: Gastropoda
- Order: Nudibranchia
- Suborder: Dendronotacea
- Family: Dotidae
- Genus: Doto
- Species: D. floridicola

Binomial name
- Doto floridicola Simroth, 1888

Synonyms
- Doto susanae Fez, 1962

= Doto floridicola =

Species of gastropod

Doto floridicola is a species of sea slug, a nudibranch, a marine gastropod mollusc in the family Dotidae.

== Distribution ==
This species was first described from the Azores. It has subsequently been reported from the UK and continental coasts south to Portugal and into the Mediterranean Sea.

== Description ==
This nudibranch is translucent white with large red spots entirely covering the ceratal tubercles. The back and sides are covered with an irregular, patchy, brown-red pigment, and there are bare areas around the bases of the cerata and along the sides of the foot.

== Ecology ==
Doto floridicola feeds on the hydroid Aglaophenia kirchenpaueri, family Aglaopheniidae.
