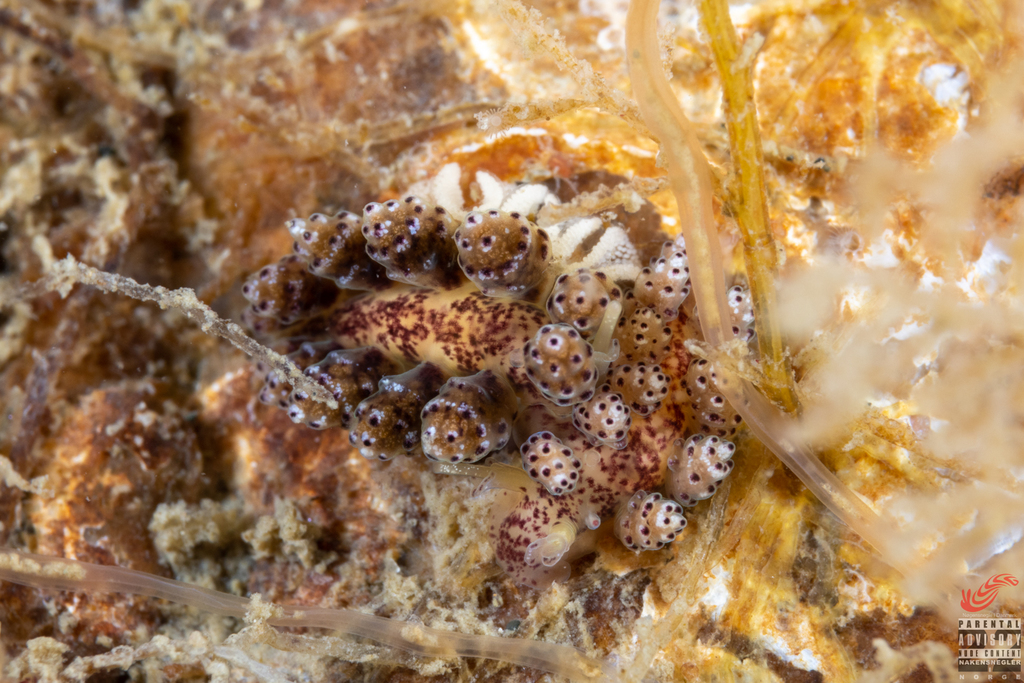

Scientific classification
- Kingdom: Animalia
- Phylum: Mollusca
- Class: Gastropoda
- Order: Nudibranchia
- Suborder: Dendronotacea
- Family: Dotidae
- Genus: Doto
- Species: D. hydrallmaniae

Binomial name
- Doto hydrallmaniae Morrow, Thorpe & Picton, 1992

= Doto hydrallmaniae =

Species of gastropod

Doto hydrallmaniae is a species of sea slug, a nudibranch, a marine gastropod mollusc in the family Dotidae.

== Distribution ==
This species was first described from the Isle of Man, United Kingdom.

== Description ==
This nudibranch is translucent white with dark red spots on the ceratal tubercles. Its body size attains 10 mm.

== Ecology ==
Doto hydrallmaniae feeds on the hydroid Hydrallmania falcata, family Sertulariidae.
