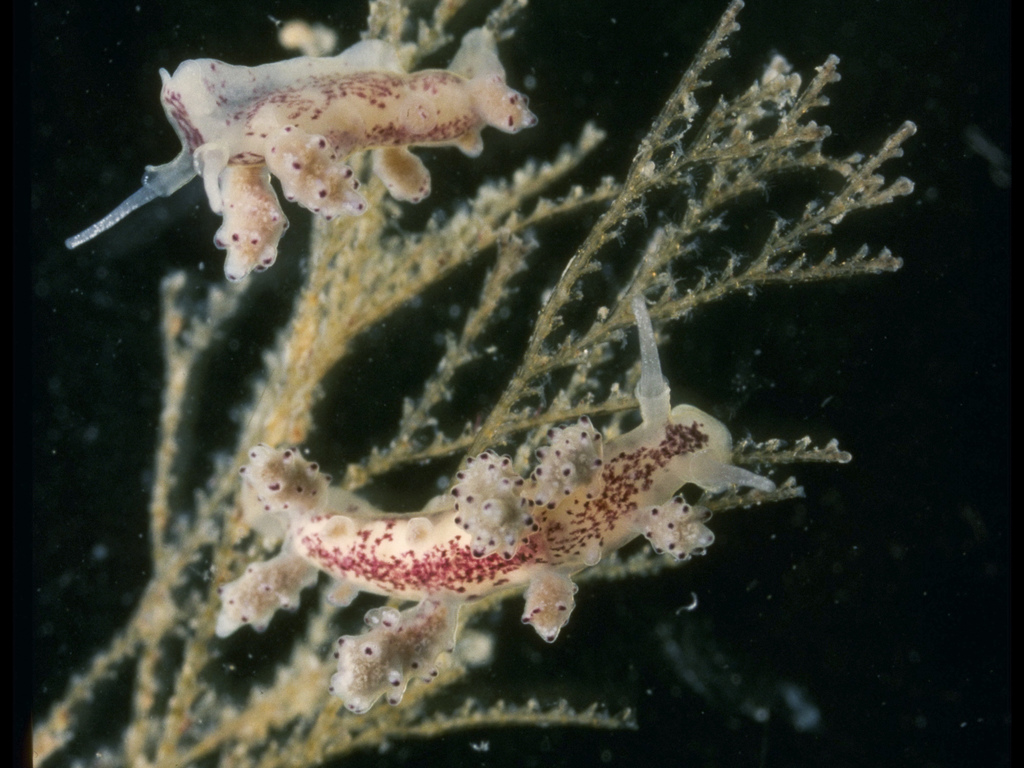

Scientific classification
- Kingdom: Animalia
- Phylum: Mollusca
- Class: Gastropoda
- Order: Nudibranchia
- Suborder: Dendronotacea
- Family: Dotidae
- Genus: Doto
- Species: D. eireana

Binomial name
- Doto eireana Lemche, 1976

= Doto eireana =

Species of gastropod

Doto eireana is a species of sea slug, a nudibranch, a marine gastropod mollusc in the family Dotidae.

== Distribution ==
This species was first described from Galway Bay, Ireland. It has subsequently been reported widely in Britain and Ireland.

== Description ==
This nudibranch is translucent white with dark red spots on the ceratal tubercles.

== Ecology ==
Doto eireana feeds on the hydroid Amphisbetia operculata, family Sertulariidae.
