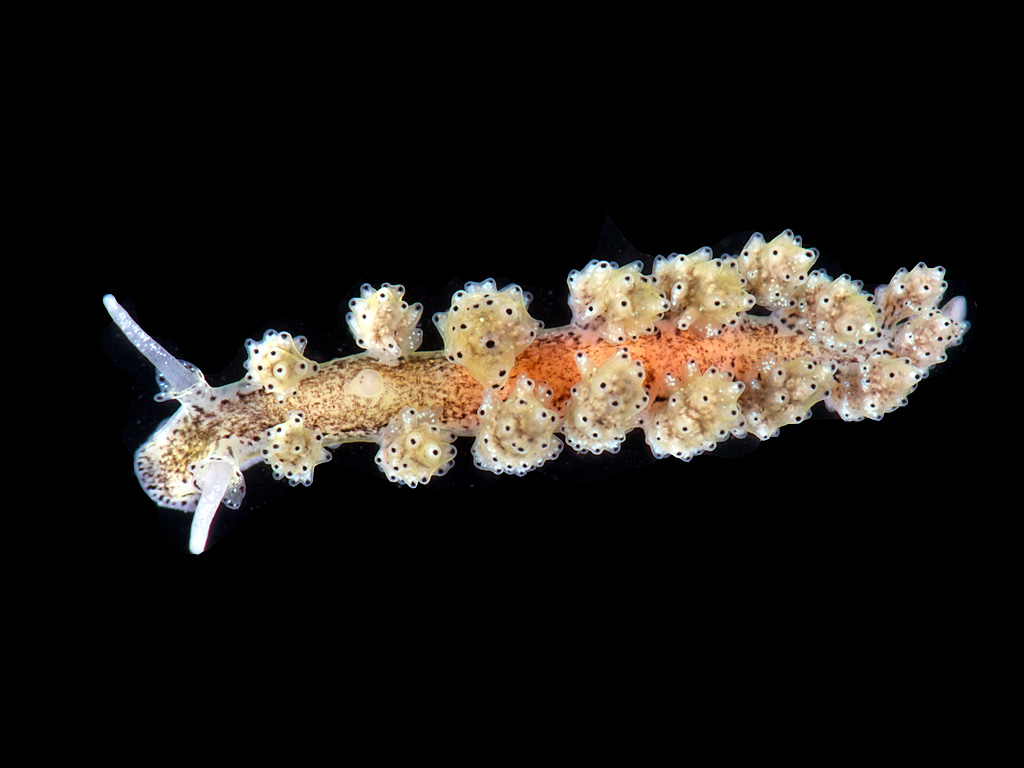
- The nudibranch Doto pinnatifida, Pembrokeshire, Wales, UK

Scientific classification
- Kingdom: Animalia
- Phylum: Mollusca
- Class: Gastropoda
- Order: Nudibranchia
- Suborder: Dendronotacea
- Family: Dotidae
- Genus: Doto
- Species: D. pinnatifida

Binomial name
- Doto pinnatifida (Montagu, 1804)

Synonyms
- Doris pinnatifida Montagu, 1804; Doto nigra Eliot, 1910; Tritonia pinnatifida

= Doto pinnatifida =

Species of gastropod

Doto pinnatifida is a species of sea slug, a nudibranch, and is found around the United Kingdom and France. It is a marine gastropod mollusc in the family Dotidae.

== Distribution ==
This species was described from Devon, England. It is commonly found in the North Atlantic Ocean around the coasts of the United Kingdom and France. It has been reported, probably in error, from around the South African coast where it is found from the Atlantic coast to Knysna. The South African species is known from the intertidal to 30 m. The South African specimens are quite different in appearance to specimens from the NE Atlantic and are likely to be an undescribed species and will be referred to here as Doto cf. pinnatifida.

== Description ==
Doto pinnatifida is a moderately sized (up to 30mm) pale-bodied nudibranch, with darkly mottled nodular clusters of cerata extending in pairs down the body. The rhinophores extend from cup-like sheaths which have black spots in the margin.

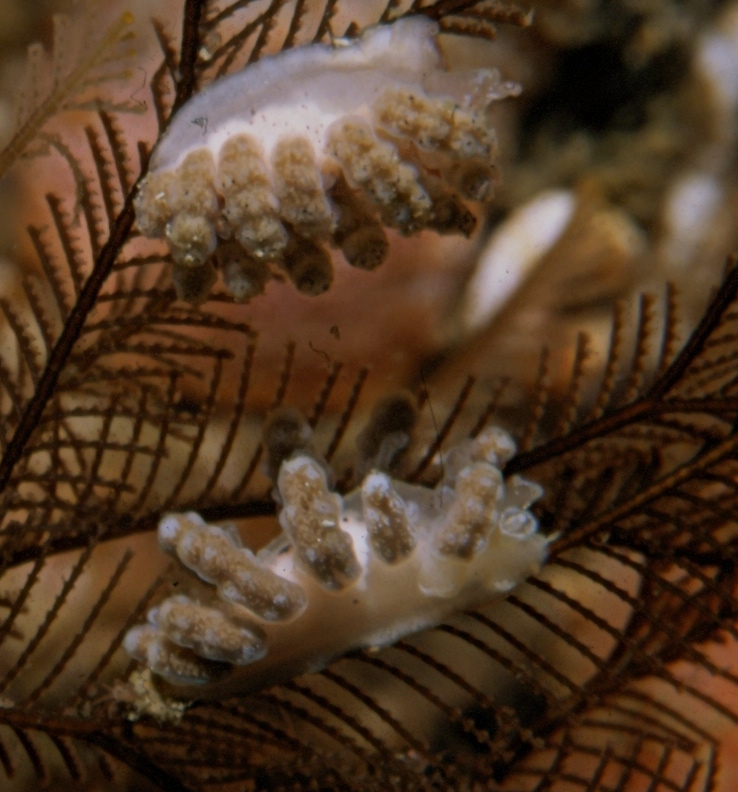
The feathered doto, Doto cf. pinnatifida, taken in 25 m of water on the Atlantic side of the Cape Peninsula. Animals about 15 mm total length.

== Ecology ==
Doto pinnatifida feeds exclusively on the hydroid Nemertesia antennina.
