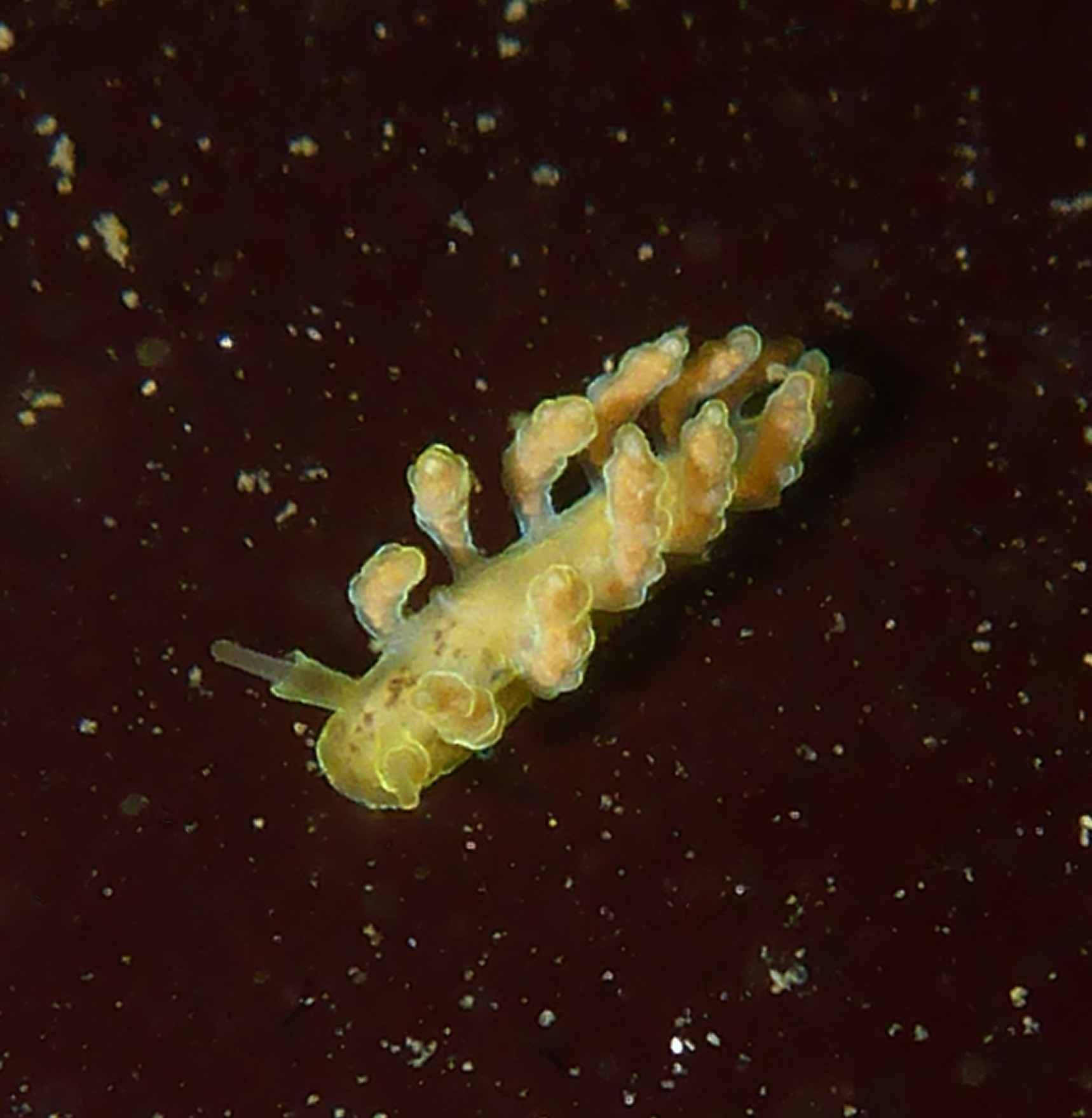
- Doto columbiana from Pillar Point, California

Scientific classification
- Kingdom: Animalia
- Phylum: Mollusca
- Class: Gastropoda
- Order: Nudibranchia
- Suborder: Dendronotacea
- Family: Dotidae
- Genus: Doto
- Species: D. columbiana

Binomial name
- Doto columbiana O'Donoghue, 1921

= Doto columbiana =

Species of gastropod

Doto columbiana is a species of sea slug, a nudibranch, a marine gastropod mollusc in the family Dotidae.

== Distribution ==
This species was first described from specimens dredged at 22–33 m depth between Brandon Island and the head of Departure Bay and two more from Nanoose Bay, Vancouver Island, British Columbia, Canada. It has been reported from the Pacific coast of North America from British Columbia to Santa Barbara, California.

== Description ==
This species of Doto has a cream coloured body with grey mottled markings on the back and sides. This pigment can vary from pale grey-brown to almost black in some individuals. The dark pigment forms rings around the bases of the cerata in well-marked specimens.

== Ecology ==
Doto columbiana feeds on the hydroid Aglaophenia sp., family Aglaopheniidae.
