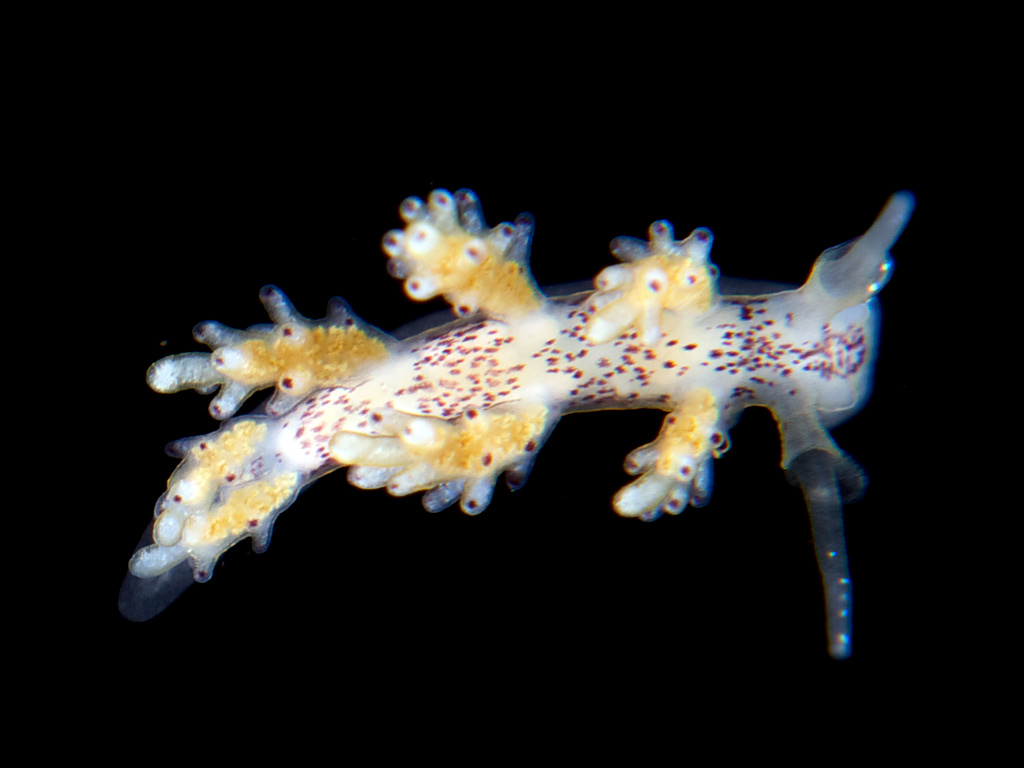
- The nudibranch Doto maculata, Strangford Lough, Co. Down, Northern Ireland, UK. 3mm. in length.

Scientific classification
- Kingdom: Animalia
- Phylum: Mollusca
- Class: Gastropoda
- Order: Nudibranchia
- Suborder: Dendronotacea
- Family: Dotidae
- Genus: Doto
- Species: D. maculata

Binomial name
- Doto maculata Montagu, 1804

= Doto maculata =

Species of gastropod

Doto maculata is a species of sea slug, a nudibranch, a marine gastropod mollusc in the family Dotidae.

== Distribution ==
This species was first described from Devon, United Kingdom. It was re-described and separated from synonymy with Doto coronata by Lemche in 1976.

== Description ==
This nudibranch is translucent white with dark red spots on the ceratal tubercles. It is one of the smaller representatives of the Doto coronata group of species. One of its most distinctive features is the length of the tubercles on the cerata.

== Ecology ==
Doto maculata feeds on the hydroid Halopteris catharina, family Halopterididae.
