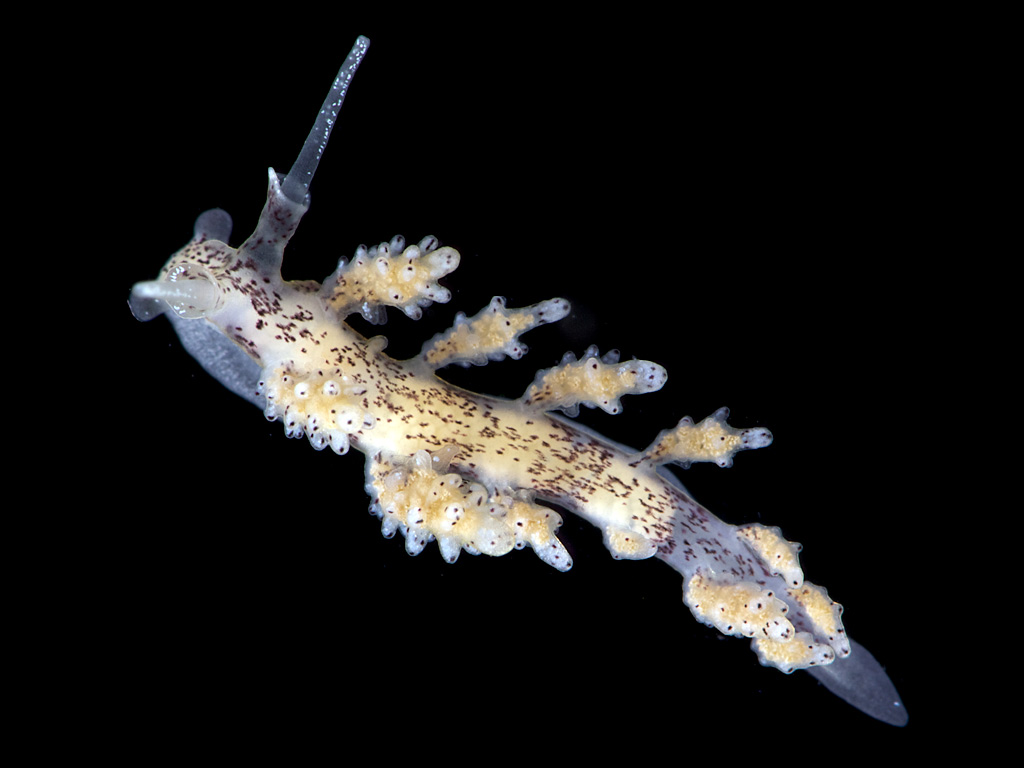
- The nudibranch Doto millbayana, Strangford Lough, Co. Down, Northern Ireland, UK.

Scientific classification
- Kingdom: Animalia
- Phylum: Mollusca
- Class: Gastropoda
- Order: Nudibranchia
- Suborder: Dendronotacea
- Family: Dotidae
- Genus: Doto
- Species: D. millbayana

Binomial name
- Doto millbayana Lemche, 1976

= Doto millbayana =

Species of gastropod

Doto millbayana is a species of sea slug, a nudibranch, a marine gastropod mollusc in the family Dotidae.

== Distribution ==
This species was first described from Plymouth, United Kingdom. It has subsequently been reported widely in Britain and Ireland, and south to Galicia, Spain.

== Description ==
This nudibranch is translucent white with dark red spots on the ceratal tubercles. Extra spots occur on the surfaces of the cerata between the tubercles. The back and sides are spattered with red pigment which extends up the inner faces of the rhinophore sheaths.

== Ecology ==
Doto millbayana feeds on the hydroid Plumularia setacea, family Plumulariidae.
