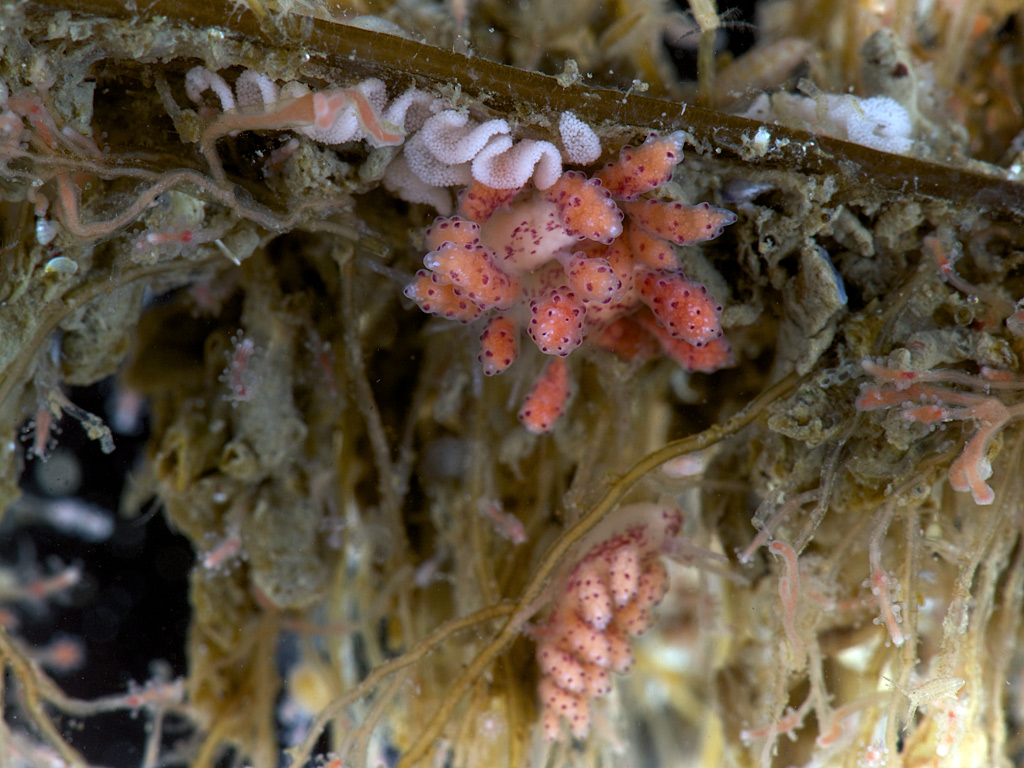
- In Strangford Lough, Co. Down, Northern Ireland, UK

Scientific classification
- Kingdom: Animalia
- Phylum: Mollusca
- Class: Gastropoda
- Order: Nudibranchia
- Suborder: Dendronotacea
- Family: Dotidae
- Genus: Doto
- Species: D. sarsiae

Binomial name
- Doto sarsiae Morrow, Thorpe & Picton, 1992

= Doto sarsiae =

Species of gastropod

Doto sarsiae is a species of sea slug, a nudibranch, a marine gastropod mollusc in the family Dotidae.

== Distribution ==
This species was first described from the Isle of Man, United Kingdom.

== Description ==
This nudibranch is translucent white with dark red spots on the ceratal tubercles. The digestive gland inside the cerata is bright rose-red in colour. Its body size attains 12 mm.

== Ecology ==
Doto sarsiae feeds on the hydroid Coryne eximia, family Corynidae, formerly Sarsia eximia.
