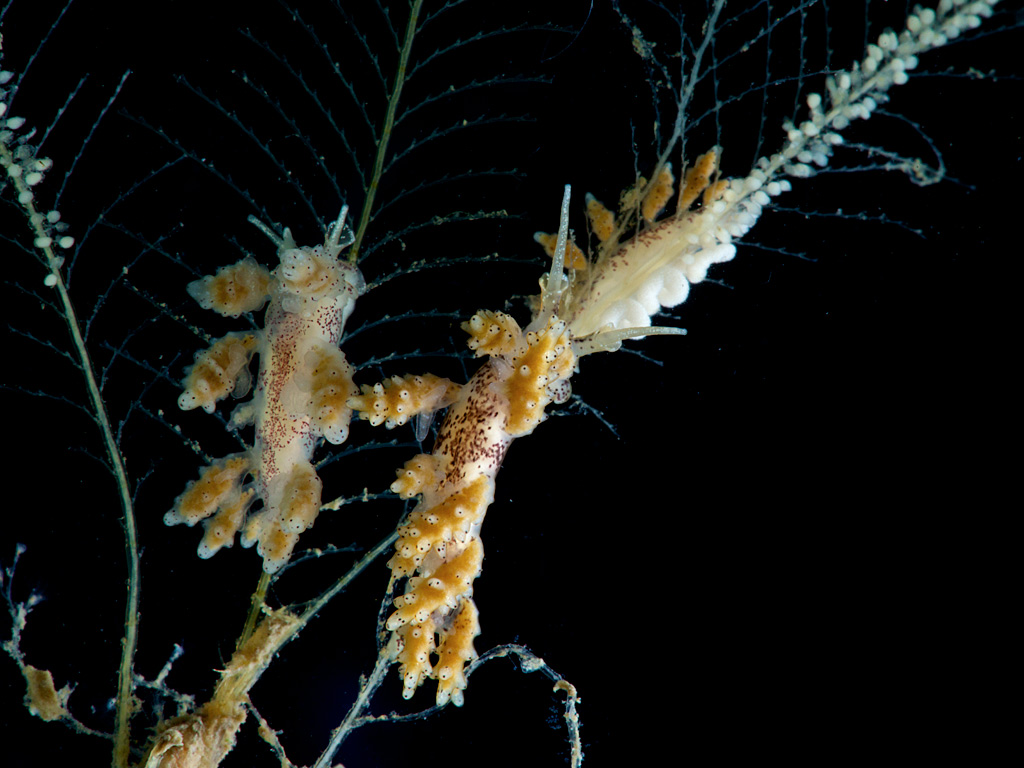
- The nudibranch Doto dunnei, Strangford Lough, Northern Ireland.

Scientific classification
- Kingdom: Animalia
- Phylum: Mollusca
- Class: Gastropoda
- Order: Nudibranchia
- Suborder: Dendronotacea
- Family: Dotidae
- Genus: Doto
- Species: D. dunnei

Binomial name
- Doto dunnei Lemche, 1976

= Doto dunnei =

Species of gastropod

Doto dunnei is a species of sea slug, a nudibranch, a marine gastropod mollusc in the family Dotidae.

== Distribution ==
This species was first described from Galway Bay, Ireland. It has subsequently been reported widely in Britain and Ireland. It is known to occur on the Mediterranean coast of Spain

== Description ==
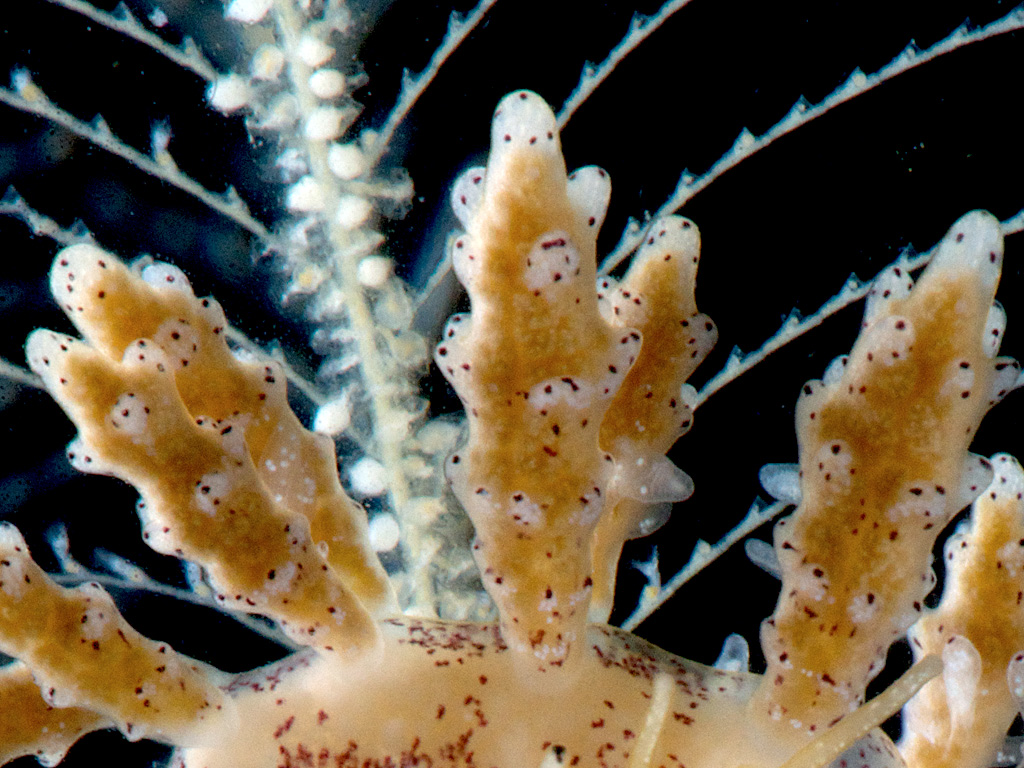
Detail of cerata, Doto dunnei.

This nudibranch is translucent white with dark red or black spots on the tips of the ceratal tubercles. Extra spots occur on the sides of the tubercles. The back and sides are spattered with red or brown pigment which extends up the inner faces of the rhinophore sheaths.

== Ecology ==
Doto dunnei feeds on the hydroid Kirchenpaueria pinnata.
