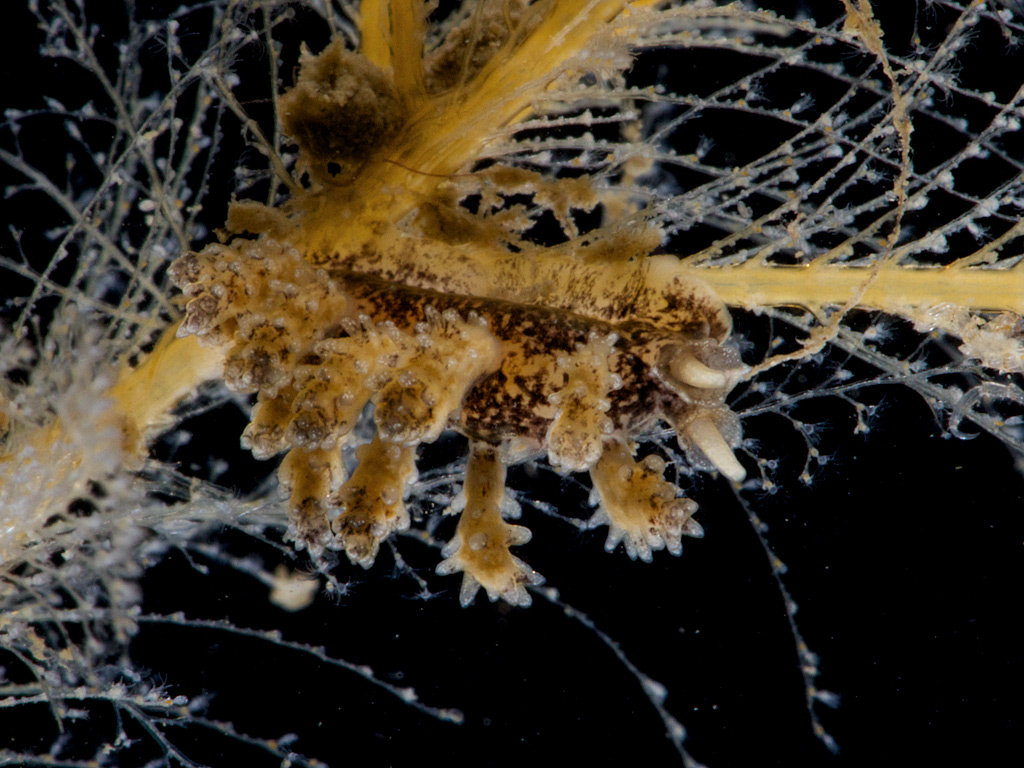
- The nudibranch Doto cuspidata, Strangford Lough, Northern Ireland.

Scientific classification
- Kingdom: Animalia
- Phylum: Mollusca
- Class: Gastropoda
- Order: Nudibranchia
- Suborder: Dendronotacea
- Family: Dotidae
- Genus: Doto
- Species: D. cuspidata

Binomial name
- Doto cuspidata Alder & Hancock, 1862

= Doto cuspidata =

Species of gastropod

Doto cuspidata is a species of sea slug, a nudibranch, a marine gastropod mollusc in the family Dotidae.

== Distribution ==
This species was first described from Shetland. It has subsequently been reported widely in Britain and Ireland as far south as Lundy Island, Bristol Channel.

== Description ==
This nudibranch has the body spattered with dark brown or black pigment on a cream background. In some individuals the black can merge to give an almost completely black animal. There are no spots on the tips of the ceratal tubercles, which are somewhat pointed and have small white glands inside them, as in most species of Doto. The rims of the rhinophore sheaths are normally divided into lobes.

== Ecology ==
Doto cuspidata feeds on the hydroid Nemertesia ramosa, family Plumulariidae.
