= Henning Mourier Lemche =

Danish zoologist (1904–1977)

Henning Mourier Lemche (11 August 1904, Copenhagen – 4 August 1977) was a Danish zoologist.

Henning Mourier Lemche was the son of Søren Jacobsen Lemche and Inge Lemche née Mourier. He was educated at the University of Copenhagen, where he received his doctorate in 1937. He married Inger Sodemann on 17 April 1932. They had three children.

From 1924 to 1948, he worked in of the Laboratory of Zoology at the Royal Veterinary and Agricultural University located in Frederiksberg, Denmark. Starting in 1949, he worked in the Department of Zoology at the University of Copenhagen. He became Curator of Molluscs at the Zoological Museum in 1955, and Master Assistant in 1962.

After 1948, he was a member of the International Commission on Zoological Nomenclature.

He wrote Fra Molekyle til Menneske (1945) and many scientific papers. He was interested in insects as well as nudibranchs. Henning Mourier Lemche discovered the mollusc Neopilina galatheae, one of the three last living species that are descendants of a fossil species group. The cephalopods were then thought to have evolved from a monoplacophoran-like ancestor with a curved, tapering shell.

The World Register of Marine Species lists 14 marine species named by Henning Mourier Lemche. and 9 species named after him

== Works ==
- Lemche, H., (1929). Gastropoda Opisthobranchiata. Zoology of Faroes 53: 1–35
- Lemche, H., (1935). On some nudibranchiate gastropods from the northern Atlantic. Videnskabelige Meddelelser fra Dansk Naturhistorisk Forening 99: 131–148.
- Lemche, H., (1945) Fra Molekyle til Menneske : Udviklingslæren i moderne Belysning [In] Hirschsprungs populærvidenskabelige håndbøger; 11
- Lemche, H., (1948). Northern and arctic tectibranch Gastropods. Det Kongelige Danske Videnskabernes Selskab, Biologiske Skrifter. 5 (3): 1–136
- Lemche, H., (1957). A new living deep-sea mollusc of the Cambro-Devonian class Monoplacophora. Nature 179: 413–416 fig. 1-4
- Lemche, Henning (1960). A possible central place for Stenethecoides Resser, 1939 and Cambridium Horny, 1957 (Mollusca Monoplacophora) in invertebrate phylogeny. Rep. Int. Geol. Congr.,. XXI Session, Norden (Pt. 22): 92–101.
- Lemche, H., (1962). Doto Oken. 1815 (Gastropoda); proposed validation under the plenary powers. Z.N.(S.) 1006. Bulletin of Zoological Nomenclature, 19(3):156–159
- Lemche, H., (1964). Cavolina Abildgaard, 1791 (Gastropoda): proposed emendation under the plenary powers to Cavolinia. Z.N.(S.) 1103. Bulletin of Zoological Nomenclature 21: 45–47.
- Lemche, H., (1964). Proposed use of the plenary powers to grant precedence to the family-group Cuthonidae over Tergipedidae and to stabilize some specific names in the genus known as Eubranchus Forbes, 1838. Z. N. (s): 1044. Bulletin of Zoological Nomenclature 21: 35–39
- Lemche, H., (1967). Rhinodiaphana g.n. ventricosa (Jeffreys, 1865) redescribed. Sarsia 29: 207–214
- Lemche, H., (1971). Gunnar A.W. Thorson. Videnskabelige Meddelelser fra Dansk naturhistorisk Forening i Köbenhavn Forening134: 205–216.
- Lemche, H., (1974). Revised proposal on the validation of Aglaja Renier, 1807, Aglaja depicta Renier, 1807 and Aglaja tricolorata Renier, 1807 (Mollusca: Opisthobranchia). Bulletin of Zoological Nomenclature 31 (4): 196–199
- Lemche, H., (1975). The basic structural pattern of Pogonophora. Zeitschrift für zoologische Systematik und Evolutionsforschung Sonderheft 1975: 123–126.
- Lemche, H., (1976). Comment on the proposed validation of Halecium Oken, 1815. Z.N. (S.)2116 Bull. zool. Nom. 33 1: 72.
- Lemche, H., (1976). New British species of Doto Oken, 1815. Journal of the Marine Biological Association of the United Kingdom 56: 691–706
- Lemche, H., Hansen, B., Madsen, F.J., Tendal, O.S. & Wolff, T. (1976). Hadal life as analyzed from photographs. Videnskabelige Meddelelser fra Dansk Naturhistorisk Forening I Kobenhavn, 139, 263–336.
- Lemche, H. & Thompson, T.E. (1974). Three Opisthobranch Gastropods new to the British fauna. Proceedings of the Malacological Society of London 41: 185–193
- Lemche, H. & Wingstrand, K.G., 1959. The anatomy of Neopolina galathea Lemche, 1957 (Mollusca Tryblidiacea). Galathea Report, 3: 9–72, pl. 1-56
- Just, M. & Edmunds, M., (1985). North Atlantic nudibranchs (Mollusca) seen by Henning Lemche. Ophelia Suppl. 2, pp. 170. (Lemche's paintings of nudibranchs)

== See also ==
- Tryblidiida
