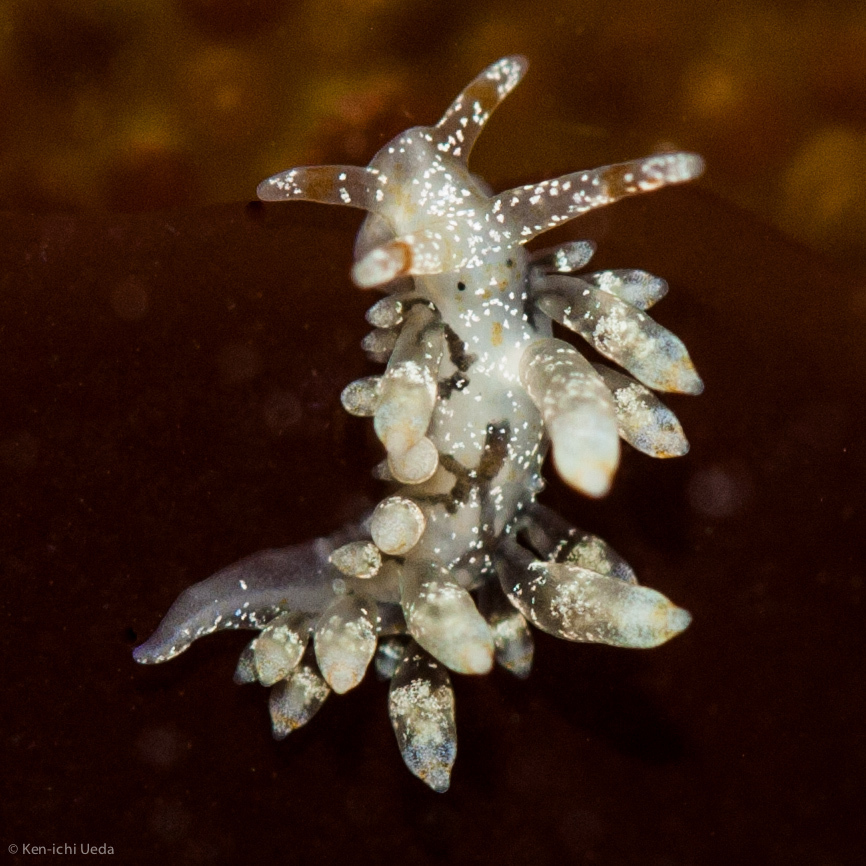

Scientific classification
- Kingdom: Animalia
- Phylum: Mollusca
- Class: Gastropoda
- Order: Nudibranchia
- Suborder: Aeolidacea
- Genus: Eubranchulus
- Species: E. olivaceus

Binomial name
- Eubranchulus olivaceus (O'Donoghue, 1922)

Synonyms
- Eubranchulus olivacea O'Donoghue, 1922; Galvina olivacea O'Donoghue, 1922

= Eubranchulus olivaceus =

Species of gastropod

Eubranchulus olivaceus is a species of sea slug or nudibranch, a marine gastropod mollusc in the family Eubranchidae.

== Distribution ==
This species was described from Jesse Island and Brandon Island, Departure Bay, and the biological research station at Nanaimo, Vancouver Island, Canada. It is considered by some authors to be a synonym of the North Atlantic species Eubranchulus rupium.

== Biology ==
In the original description Eubranchulus olivaceus is reported to feed on Obelia longissima. It is also reported to feed on the hydroids Laomedea flexuosa, Obelia spp., & Plumularia sp.
