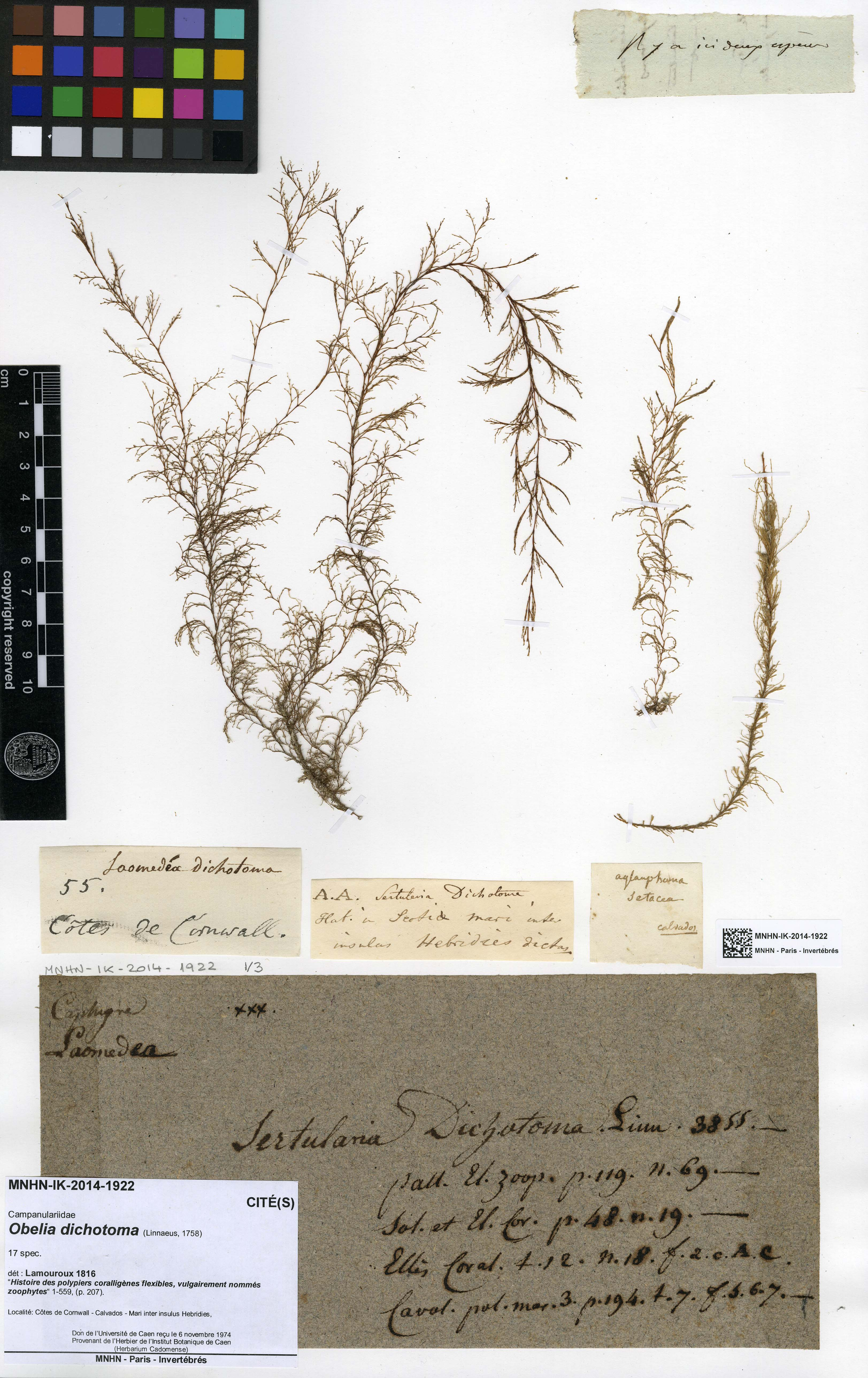

Scientific classification
- Kingdom: Animalia
- Phylum: Cnidaria
- Class: Hydrozoa
- Order: Leptothecata
- Family: Campanulariidae
- Genus: Obelia
- Species: O. dichotoma

Binomial name
- Obelia dichotoma (Linnaeus, 1758)

= Obelia dichotoma =

Species of hydrozoan

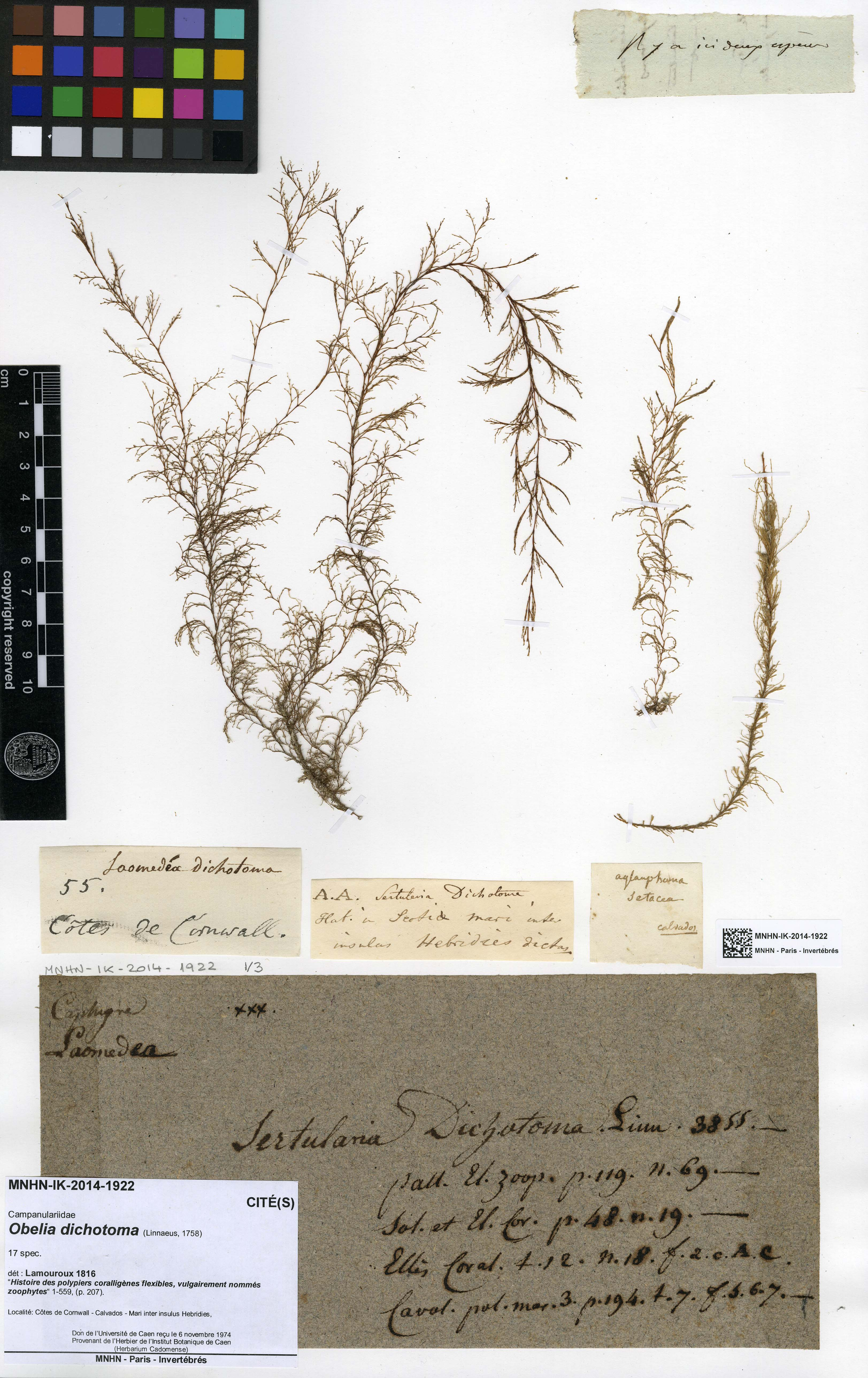

Obelia dichotoma is a broadly distributed, mainly marine but sometimes freshwater, colonial hydrozoan in the order Leptothecata that forms regular branching stems and a distinctive hydrotheca. O. dichotoma can be found in climates from the arctic to the tropics in protected waters such as marshes and creeks but not near open coasts like beaches in depths up to 250 m. O. dichotoma uses asexual and sexual reproduction and feeds on mainly zooplankton and fecal pellets. Obelia dichotoma has a complex relationship with the ecosystem and many economic systems.

== Description ==
A thecate hydroid with a hydrotheca long enough to enclose the hydranth, feeding polyp, when fully contracted. The bell- or goblet-shaped hydrotheca lacks an operculum, but it contains a diaphragm at the base and changes to a brown color over time. The rim of the hydrotheca is smooth or softly toothed and can be used to distinguish O. dichotoma from other Obelia species. O. dichotoma polyp height ranges from 215 to 300 μm and diameter from 210 to 275 μm. The colony of O. dichotoma forms slender alternative branching stems with hydrocauli up to 350 mm tall, with the hydranths located on thin stalks. The medusae of O. dichotoma swim freely in water and are disk-shaped with 16 or more tentacles. The medusae tentacles are not highly specialized but contain nematocysts grouped in rings.

=== Distinction from Obelia sp. ===
Obelia dichotoma can be distinguished from other species using the morphological traits of the organism. Obelia bidentata has toothed rims on the hydrotheca, and, unlike O. dichotoma_{,} older parts of the colony do not turn brown. Obelia geniculata is unbranched and usually lives on brown algae. Obelia dichotoma can be distinguished from Clytia spp. by counting tentacle numbers because Clytia have fewer than 16 tentacles. Another genus, Gonothyraea, can be distinguished from O. dichotoma because medusae remain attached to the polyps and are not free-swimming.

== Distribution and habitat ==
Obelia dichotoma is widely distributed throughout protected marine areas and freshwaters, and, like many other hydroids, colonies attach to structures such as pilings, debris, seaweeds, grasses, and barnacles at depths from <25 m up to 275 m. O. dichotoma is relatively uncommon in the open coast such as beach areas. This hydroid has been found on both coasts of the U.S., in the Mediterranean Sea, around Australia, and at the southern tip of Africa.

== Biology ==
=== Life cycle ===
Obelia dichotoma house the reproductive polyps in the angles of the branches. The polyps develop and bud off to form medusae about 0.05 mm in diameter at release that grow to about 5 mm at maturity. The medusae are either male or female with nematocysts on tentacles and produce either sperm or eggs. The fertilized egg develops into a planula larvae that settle out of the water column during the winter, spring, and early summer and grow colonies for 2–3 months.

=== Feeding and digestion ===
Hydroids are usually considered to be carnivorous organisms that feed mainly on zooplankton and, while this is generally accepted for Obelia dichotoma, a study of the O. dichotoma population in the Kongsfjorden (Spitsbergen, Arctic) found that this population was more omnivorous in nature based on their diet. This population had a diet high in fecal pellets, organic matter, and micro algae which may be due to an environmental adaptation to the high content of these substances in the waters. This adaptation may also be attributed to the large fluctuations of zooplankton populations in this area of the Arctic. Obelia dichotoma, being one of the smaller species of hydroids, has inherent difficulty capturing prey whereas Tubalaria larynx, a larger species, that is mainly carnivorous, has the ability to capture prey with ease. Digestion time for cnidarians is highly dependent on the temperature and conditions of the environment each organism is in. The same study in the Kongsfjorden, found that O. dichotoma had a digestion time for diatoms of about 20 hours at 6 °C.

== Environmental impact ==
=== Influences on environment ===
Obelia dichotoma, along with many other hydroids, are responsible for a large impact on many marine fish farming industries through fouling properties. In particular, the finfish industry in the Mediterranean Sea has been impacted by O. dichotoma and similar hydroids in two ways. These hydroids attach to multiple structures used in the industry including ropes, nets, pilings, and cages and add weight and drag to the equipment. The hydroids can also invade the gills of the farmed fish and cause disease and other problems for the quality of the fish. O. dichotoma can cause envenomations and gill disorders through contact with the fish provided by the close proximity in the farm.

=== Influences of environment ===
Not only can O. dichotoma have a negative impact on the environment through disease and obstruction, the O. dichotoma can also benefit from environmental impact humans have on the oceanic environment. Most hydroids and similar organisms, respond negatively to increasing concentrations of fecal matter in the aqueous environment but, according to a 2018 study of the coral reefs in Havana Harbour, Cuba, O. dichotoma along with a few other species were found to have a positive reaction to increasing fecal matter concentrations in the environment.

Human interaction has an immense influence on the environment, while some are positive many are also negative, particularly in the form of over-harvesting, climate change through pollution, and habitat destruction all of which are most common in coastal regions, one of O. dichotoma's primary habitats. Human interaction also involves contaminants to the environment. Such contaminants can be metals which benefit the ecosystem at trace levels or artificial chemical which can have unknown consequences ranging from beneficial to extremely dangerous. Human interaction along with invasive species contribute to environmental disturbance which influences the diversity and abundance in ecosystems. Diversity within an ecosystem has shown to have a humped shaped relation to the productivity of that ecosystem where diversity increases productivity to a critical point then decreases. For the most part hydroids, and other benthic or benthopelagic organisms show negative consequences, decreased diversity and abundance, to increased disturbance in the ecosystem, but Obelia dichotoma has been shown to benefit from increased disturbance in the environment showing an increase in abundance and area of coverage in more disturbed conditions. The abnormality of O. dichotoma to proliferate under circumstances where similar competitors struggle is an adaptation that, for some unknown reason, occurred and made O. dichotoma unique.
