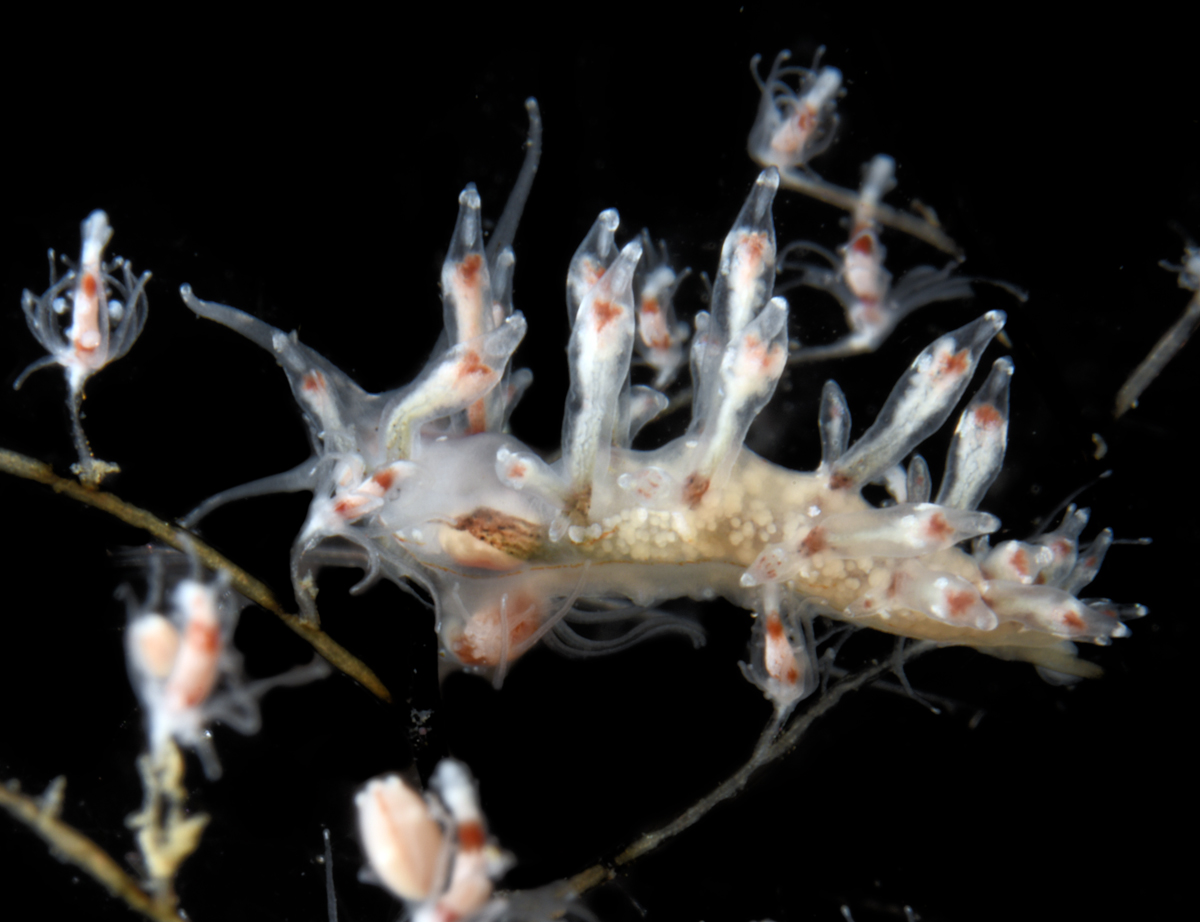
- Osezaki, Japan

Scientific classification
- Kingdom: Animalia
- Phylum: Mollusca
- Class: Gastropoda
- Order: Nudibranchia
- Suborder: Aeolidacea
- Family: Facelinidae
- Genus: Myja
- Species: M. karin

Binomial name
- Myja karin Martynov, Mehrotra, Chavanich, Nakano, Kashio, Lundin, Picton & Korshunova, 2019

= Myja karin =

Species of gastropod

Myja karin is a species of sea slug, an aeolid nudibranch, a marine gastropod mollusc in the family Facelinidae.

== Distribution ==
This species was described from a depth of 7–15 m (23–49 ft) at Osezaki, Japan, 35.028980°N 138.789830°E. A second specimen was included in the original description, from Uchiura, Ishikawa.

== Description ==
Myja karin is a slender nudibranch with unusual elongate cerata which mimic the polyps of its hydroid prey, Pennaria. It is similar to Myja longicornis but differs in having far more cerata, ten pairs in a 12 mm (0.47 in) long individual whilst Myja longicornis had only 7 pairs in animals of 15 mm (0.59 in) long. Although found together at the same site, this species and Myja hyotan differ in shape of the cerata, details of colouration, anatomy and molecular distances.
