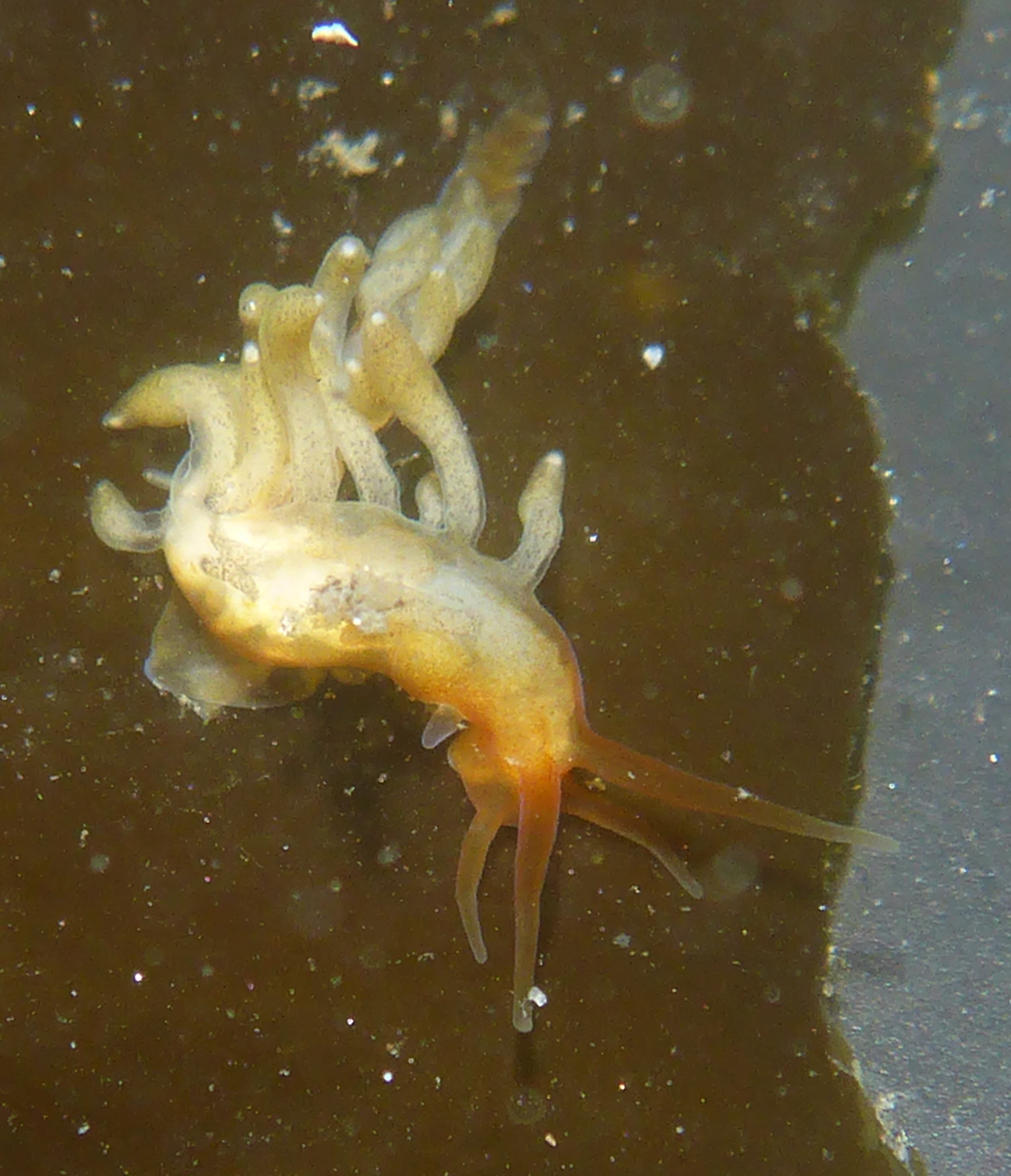
- Santa Cruz, California, USA

Scientific classification
- Kingdom: Animalia
- Phylum: Mollusca
- Class: Gastropoda
- Order: Nudibranchia
- Suborder: Aeolidacea
- Family: Cuthonidae
- Genus: Cuthona
- Species: C. phoenix

Binomial name
- Cuthona phoenix (Gosliner, 1981)

= Cuthona phoenix =

Species of gastropod

Cuthona phoenix is a species of sea slug, an aeolid nudibranch, a marine gastropod mollusc in the family Fionidae.

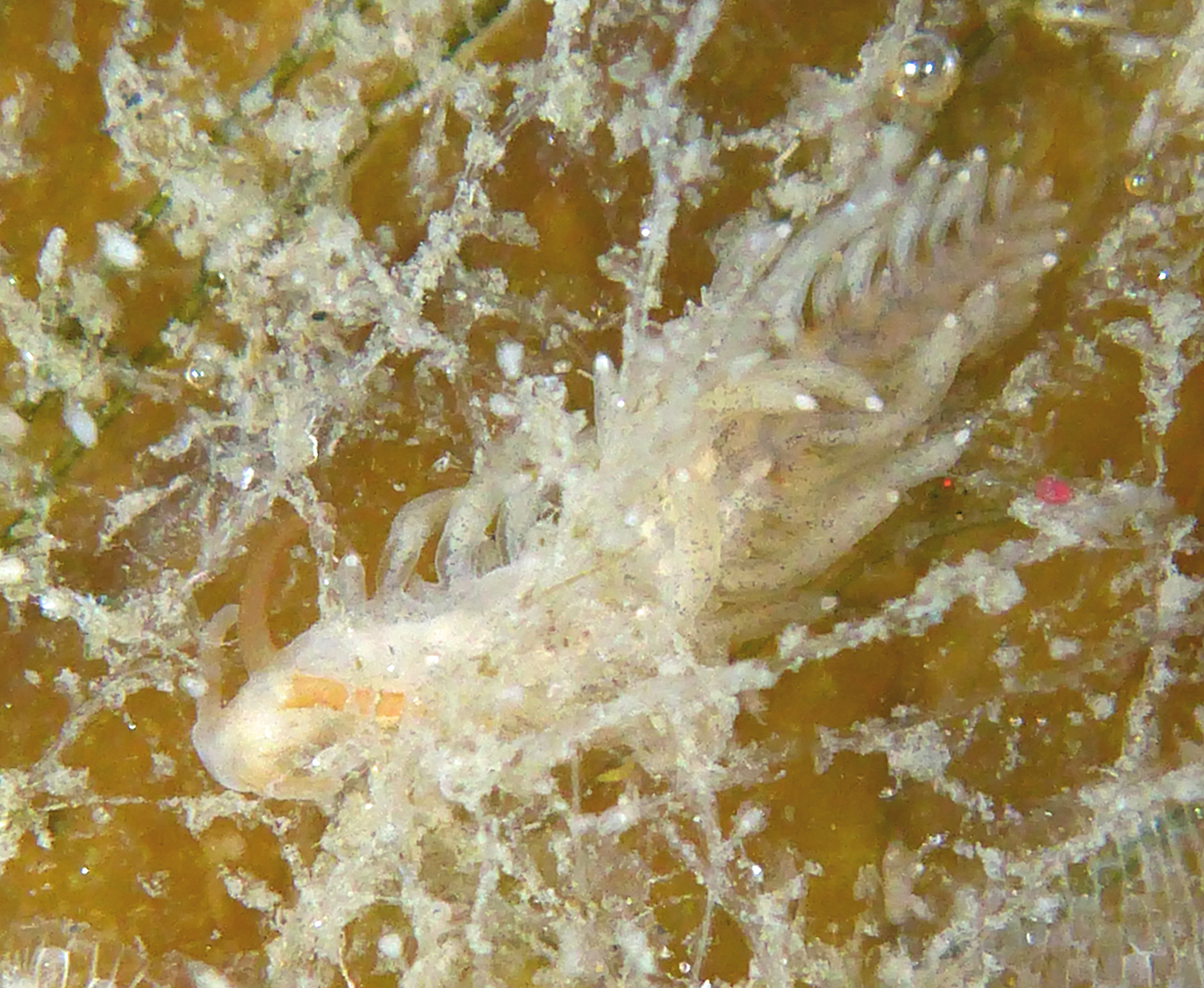
Tenellia phoenix from Santa Cruz, California

== Distribution ==
This species was described from La Jolla, California, United States. It has been reported from Monterey Bay to Mission Bay (San Diego), California and Costa Rica.

== Description ==
Tenellia phoenix is a small translucent aeolid with swollen cerata and a visible central line of digestive gland which shows through the skin. It is reminiscent of Tergipes tergipes or Eubranchus rupium but intermediate between these species in the number and arrangement of its cerata. The oral tentacles and rhinophores are suffused with brown pigment.
