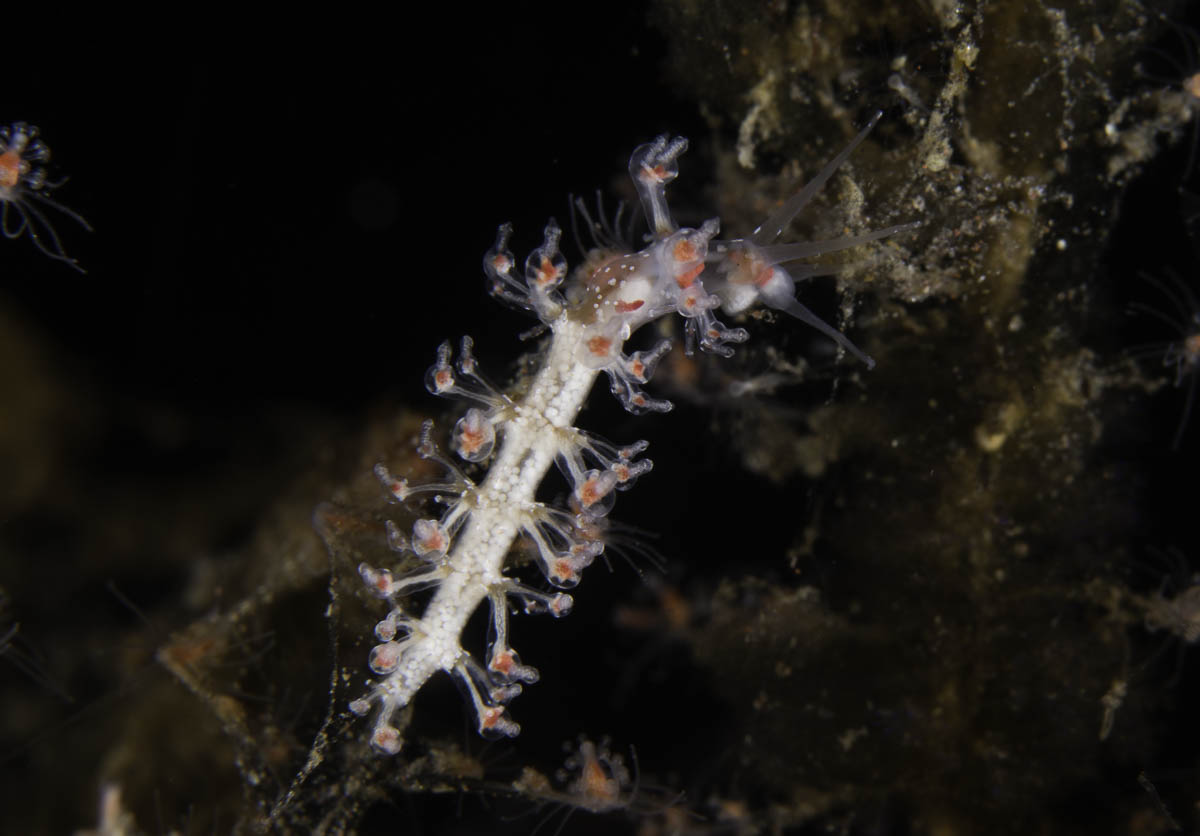
- The nudibranch Myja cf.longicornis, Batu Dawa, Bali.

Scientific classification
- Kingdom: Animalia
- Phylum: Mollusca
- Class: Gastropoda
- Order: Nudibranchia
- Suborder: Aeolidacea
- Family: Facelinidae
- Genus: Myja
- Species: M. longicornis

Binomial name
- Myja longicornis Bergh, 1896

= Myja longicornis =

Species of gastropod

Myja longicornis is a species of sea slug, an aeolid nudibranch, a marine gastropod mollusc in the family Tergipedidae. It was thought to be a close relative of Tergipes but molecular phylogeny reveals it to be a paedomorphic facelinid.

== Distribution ==
This species was described from Ambon Island, Maluku Islands, Indonesia. It is reported from the Philippines to Papua New Guinea. Specimens from Thailand may not be this species and were described as Myja cf. longicornis in a revision of the genus Myja.

== Description ==
Myja longicornis is a small nudibranch which is similar in appearance to Tergipes tergipes, but with more cerata and red markings. The cerata have a remarkable resemblance to the polyps of the hydroid Pennaria disticha on which it feeds. It has an elongated body that can reach up to 10 mm. Its rhinophores are similar in size to oral tentacles and smooth. Oral tentacles and rhinophores are with scattered opaque white dots. Digestive gland in the cerata is light to dark greyish, digestive gland in upper part of cerata with reddish internal spot, apices with white spot, and central branches of digestive gland are visible through dorsal part of body. Anterior cerata with prominent reddish basal spot in some cerata distributed over its whole surface. Jaws broadly triangular with prominent anterior wings, masticatory borders smooth. Radula uniserial, very small compared to pharynx internal volume.
