= Clytia (disambiguation) =

Clytia is a variant of Clytie, the name of several figures in Greek mythology.

Clytia or Klytia or Clytie may also refer to:

== Biology ==
- Clytia (cnidarian), a genus of hydrozoans in the family Campanulariidae
- Clytia, a spelling variant of the Euphorbiaceae genus Clutia
- Clytie (moth), a genus of moths

== Others ==
- USS Clytie (AS-26), United States Navy during World War II
- 73 Klytia, an asteroid
