= Murmania =

Scientific classification
- Kingdom: Animalia
- Phylum: Mollusca
- Class: Gastropoda
- Order: Nudibranchia
- Suborder: Aeolidacea
- Family: Fionidae
- Genus: Murmania; Martynov, 2006

Genus of gastropods

Murmania is a genus of sea slugs, aeolid nudibranchs, marine gastropod molluscs in the family Tergipedidae.

Species within the genus Murmania include:

- Murmania antiqua Martynov, 2006
