= Gastroblastea =

Scientific classification
- Domain: Eukaryota
- Kingdom: Animalia
- Phylum: Cnidaria
- Class: Hydrozoa
- Order: Leptothecata
- Family: Campanulariidae
- Genus: Gastroblastea; Keller, 1883

Genus of hydrozoans

Gastroblastea is a genus of cnidarians belonging to the family Campanulariidae.

Species:

- Gastroblastea ovale (Mayer, 1900)
