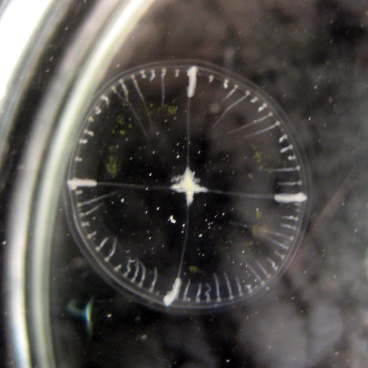

Scientific classification
- Kingdom: Animalia
- Phylum: Cnidaria
- Class: Hydrozoa
- Order: Leptothecata
- Family: Campanulariidae
- Genus: Clytia
- Species: C. gregaria

Binomial name
- Clytia gregaria (L. Agassiz, 1862)

Synonyms
- Clytia osterudi Strong, 1925; Oceania gregaria L. Agassiz, 1862; Phialidium gregarium (Agassiz, 1862)

= Clytia gregaria =

Species of hydrozoan

Clytia gregaria, sometimes referred to as the gregarious jellyfish, is a small species of hydrozoan in the family Campanulariidae. It is one of the most abundant hydrozoans of the Pacific Northwest, particularly during late spring and summer.

== Range and habitat ==
Clytia gregaria is found on the eastern Pacific Ocean, from Alaska to Oregon. It is pelagic and commonly found floating close to shore.

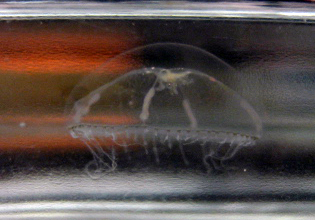
Clytia gregaria, lateral view

== Description ==
Mature individuals can reach 2 cm in diameter, but rarely reach 1.5 cm. Clytia gregaria's translucent bell is saucer-shaped, with a diameter greater than its height. Positioned close to the bell margin are four radial canals with a white or yellowish elongated gonad in each. On the bell margin are up to 60 highly extensile tentacles of equal length (in mature individuals). The mouth opens directly into the manubrium, which has four ruffled lips and is a pale yellow or brownish color. The manubrium is attached directly to the subumbrella. Sometimes there is a lateral stripe of dark pigment on the bell margin and gonads.

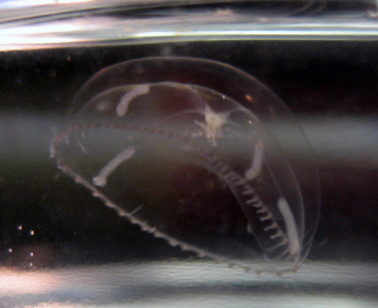
Clytia gregaria

== Life history ==
The planula of Clytia gregaria settle on a variety of substrates, on both horizontal and vertical surfaces. The planula then flattens into a pedal disk with 4-6 lobes. A stolon is visible after approximately a week, which then branches and forms a colony of hydroids. Medusae are released approximately 35–45 days after fertilization, from spring to early fall. Newly hatched medusae have 4 tentacles, with an additional 4 immature tentacular buds. The initial diameter of medusae is up to 1.4 mm, increasing to 2.5 – 3 mm within two days. Sexual maturity can be reached in 4 weeks, or sooner with optimal conditions. (Note that this data is based on laboratory conditions.) Adults are carnivorous, feeding upon soft-bodied prey such as invertebrate eggs and appendicularians. Despite its abundance during the summer, Clytia gregaria is relatively short-lived, and its lifespan rarely exceeds 3 months.

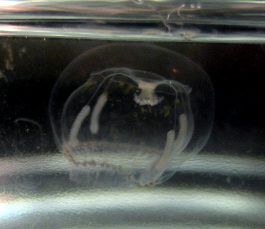
Clytia gregaria, lateral view

== Ecology ==
The larvae of the sea anemone Peachia quinquecapitata are ectoparasites of Clytia gregaria.
