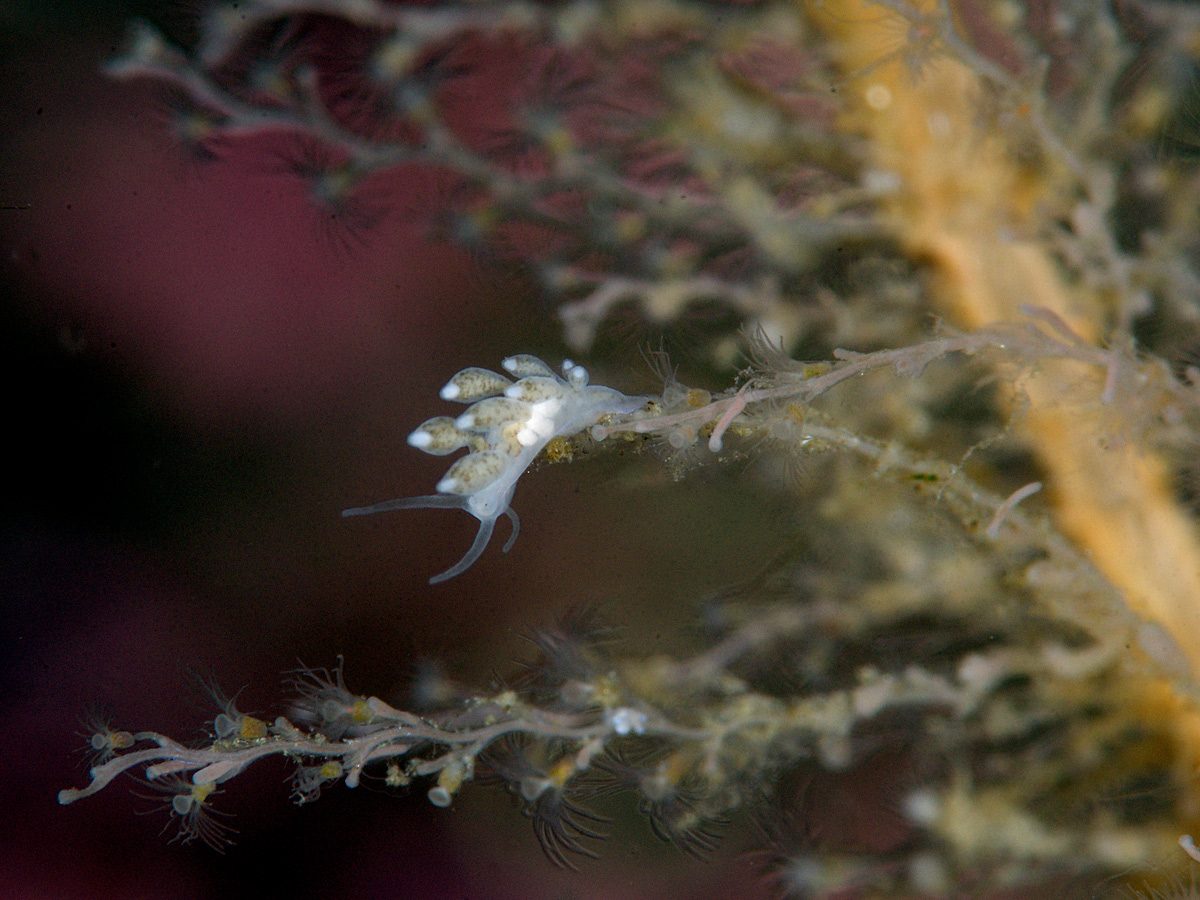
- The nudibranch Tergipes tergipes, Gulen Dive Centre, Norway.

Scientific classification
- Kingdom: Animalia
- Phylum: Mollusca
- Class: Gastropoda
- Order: Nudibranchia
- Suborder: Aeolidacea
- Family: Tergipedidae
- Genus: Tergipes
- Species: T. tergipes

Binomial name
- Tergipes tergipes (Forsskål in Niebuhr, 1775)

Synonyms
- Limax tergipes Forsskål in Niebuhr, 1775

= Tergipes tergipes =

Species of gastropod

Tergipes tergipes is a species of sea slug, an aeolid nudibranch, a marine gastropod mollusc in the family Tergipedidae.

== Distribution ==
This species was described from Øresund, Denmark. It has been reported from the NE Atlantic from Iceland and Norway south to Portugal and in the Mediterranean Sea. Reports of the same species from Brazil should be treated with caution.

== Description ==
The typical adult size of this species is 5–8 mm. A recent study showed that Tergipes tergipes is an amphi-atlantic species.

== Habitat ==
Minimum recorded depth is 4 m. Maximum recorded depth is 10 m.

Tergipes tergipes feeds on hydroids of the genus Obelia, especially Obelia geniculata. It is very similar in size and spawn shape to Eubranchus exiguus which often occurs on the same blades of kelp.
