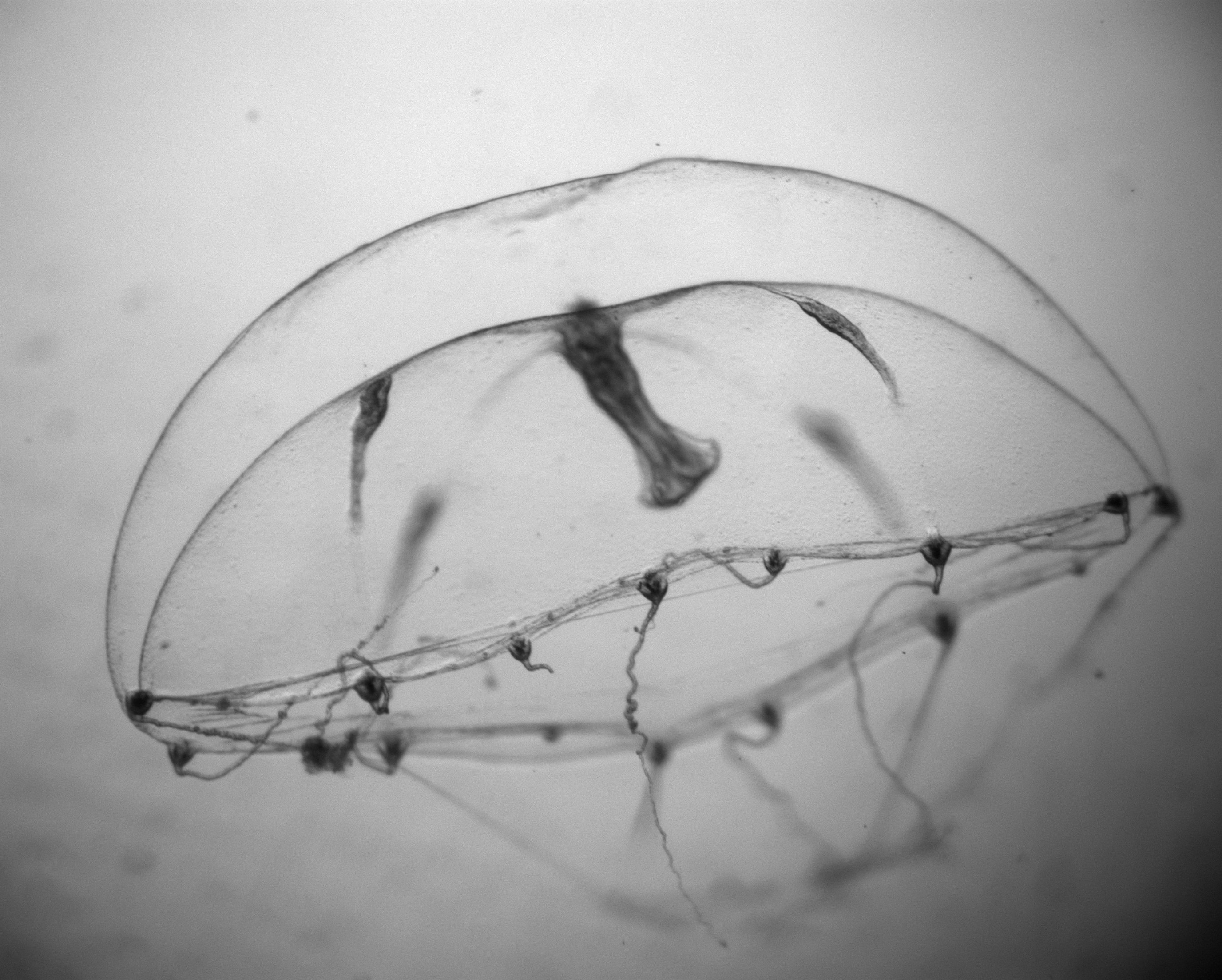
- Adult medusa, side view

Scientific classification
- Kingdom: Animalia
- Phylum: Cnidaria
- Class: Hydrozoa
- Order: Leptothecata
- Family: Campanulariidae
- Genus: Clytia
- Species: C. hemisphaerica

Binomial name
- Clytia hemisphaerica (Linnaeus, 1767)

Synonyms
- Medusa hemisphaerica Linnaeus, 1767

= Clytia hemisphaerica =

Species of hydrozoan

Clytia hemisphaerica is a small hydrozoan-group cnidarian, about 1 cm in diameter, that is found in the Mediterranean Sea and the North-East Atlantic Ocean. Clytia has the free-swimming jellyfish form typical of the Hydrozoa, as well as vegetatively propagating polyps.

Clytia hemisphaerica has emerged as a promising model organism as its life cycle, small size, and relatively easy upkeep make it conducive to experimental manipulation and maintenance in a laboratory setting. Some examples of studies already conducted in Clytia include those looking at embryonic development, differential patterns of gene expression during life stages, and wound healing. Clytia's genome was sequenced in full in March 2019.

== Anatomy and life cycle ==
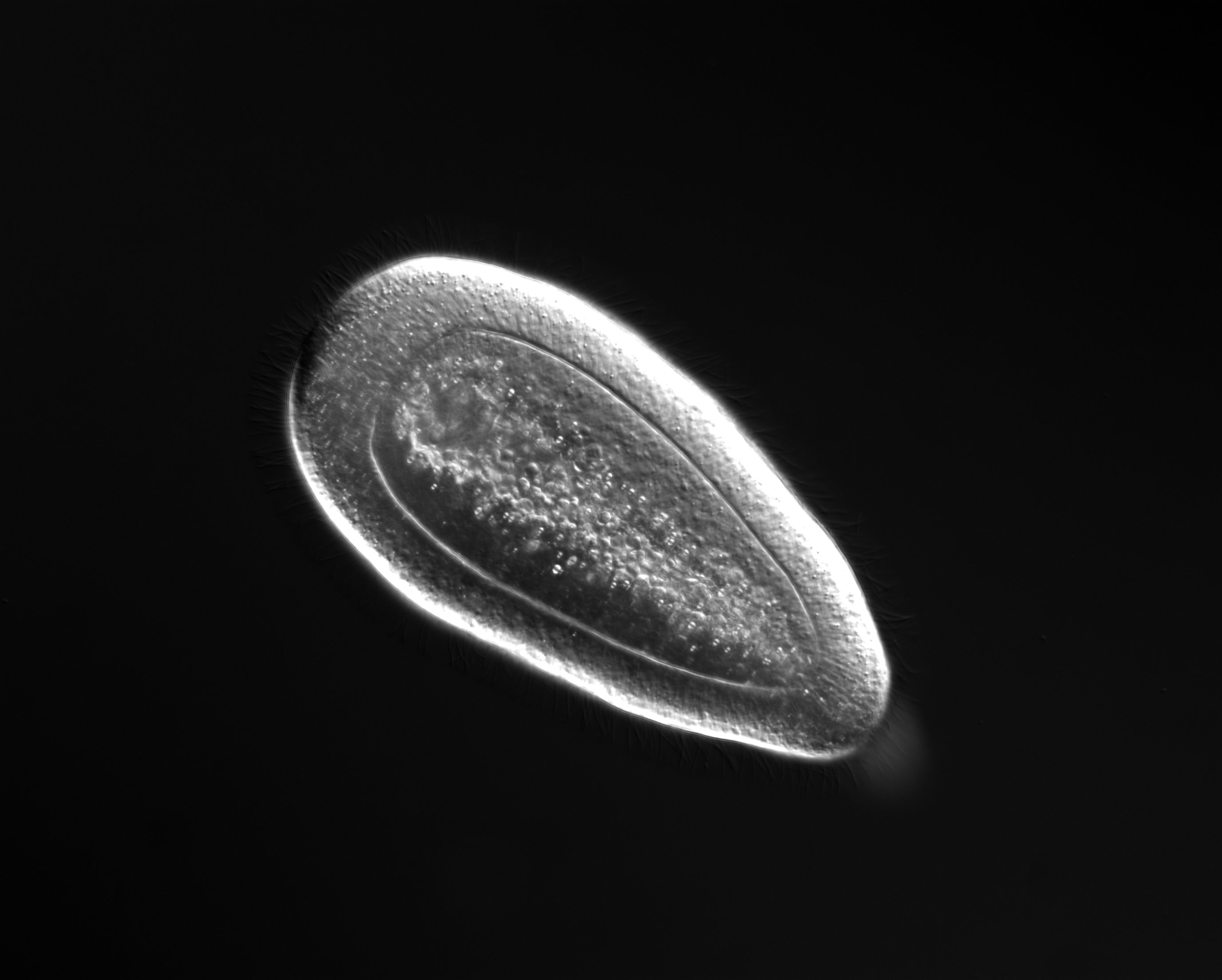
Planula stage

Clytia hemisphaerica reproduces sexually. Ovulated eggs are fertilized externally and take approximately 24 hours to develop into planula. The ciliated planula will swim freely until the proper external cues, for instance, experimental treatment with CsCl, trigger the metamorphic process. The planula can undergo its metamorphosis into a polyp as soon as three days after fertilization. Once the proper external cue is received, the planula stops swimming and attaches itself to a substrate via its aboral or aboral-lateral pole (what was previously the front end of the swimming planula). After attaching itself to a substrate, the planula contracts along its oral–aboral axis and so forms a flattened holdfast to anchor itself to the substrate.

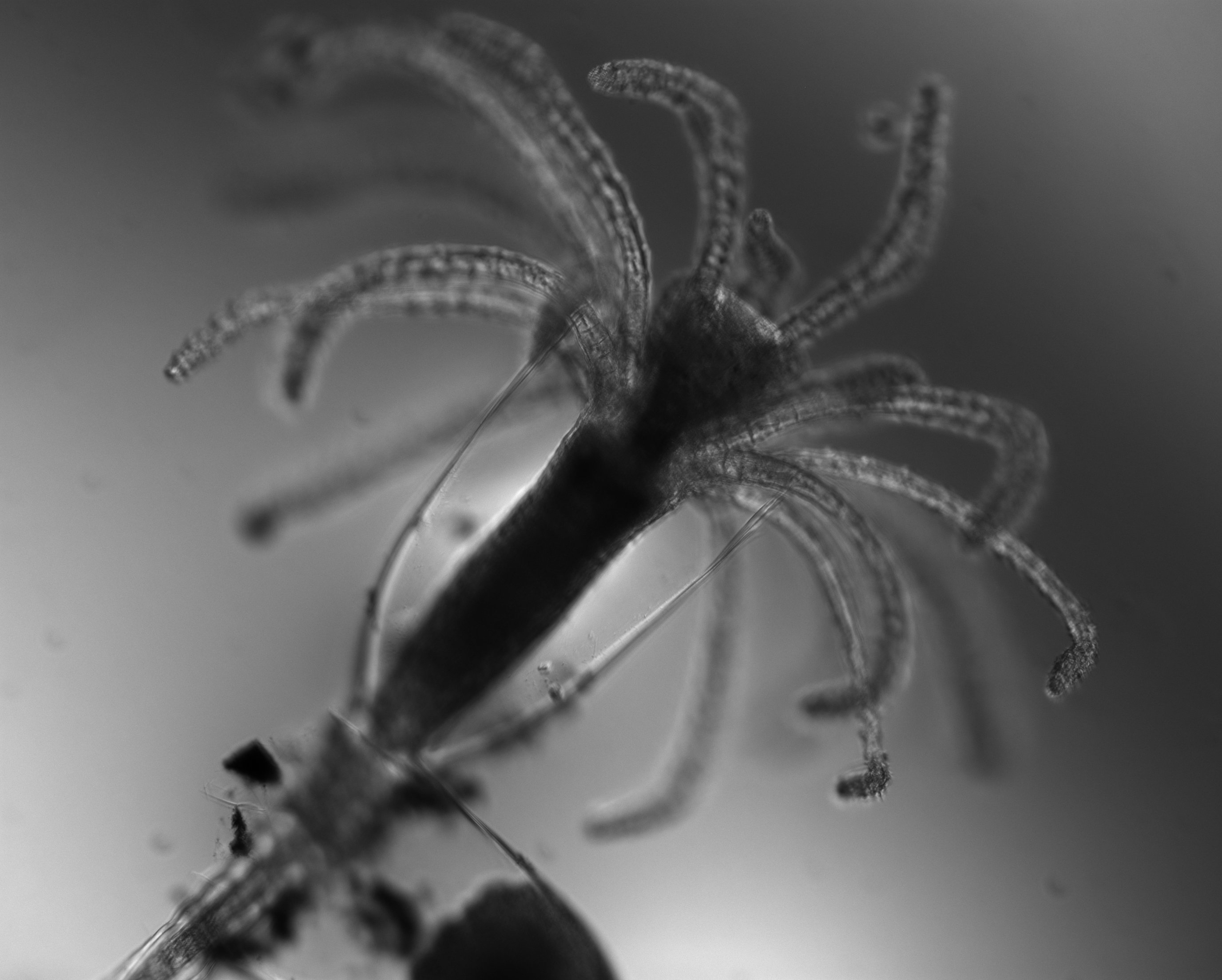
Head of a polyp

Once the planula is securely on its substrate, a stalk grows out of the holdfast and, eventually, a hydranth, also known as a gastrozooid (an individual polyp specializing in feeding) forms on the anterior end of the stalk. At this stage, the planula is now considered a primary polyp, and this polyp can propagate vegetatively by extending its stolon to form a connected colony of multiple polyps. Once it begins to aseuxally reproduce, the colony rapidly increases in size and can frequently survive predation so long as a part of it remains uneaten. In addition to the feeding gastrozooids, a mature polyp colony has reproductive gonozooids that produce baby medusa by budding. These medusa reach maturity after 2–3 weeks.

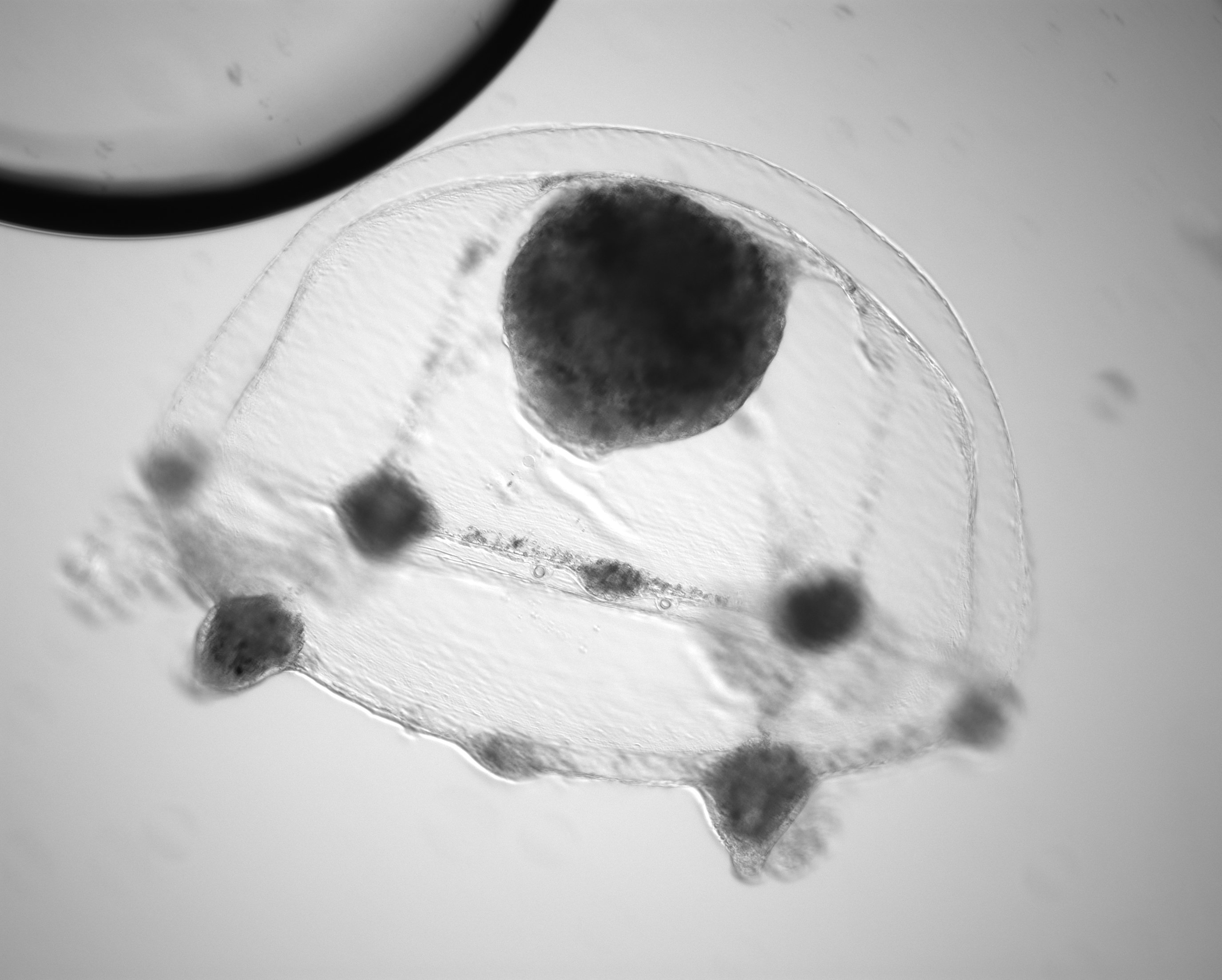
Baby medusa

Like most Cnidarians, Clytia has relatively simple morphology. However, despite containing relatively few cell types and lacking elaborate organ structures, the medusa have much greater anatomical complexity than their polyp form. Adult medusa are on average 1 cm in diameter. They are almost entirely transparent, their gonads, radial canals, short stomach, and four-lipped mouth being their most clearly visible anatomical structures. Each medusa has four gonads positioned midway along each endodermal radial canal. The gonads themselves are transparent, allowing for visualization of the oocytes within.

Each medusa typically has around 32 tentacles, each of which are covered in stinging nematocyte cells. These nematocytes are considered specialized nerve cells despite the fact that they are composed of a pressurized capsule (nematocyst), a rapid-firing, harpoon-like dart and lethal toxins made for killing prey. Clytia's nervous system is well-organized and highly specialized. Two parallel condensed nerve rings run around the periphery of the medusa's bell; the outer rings is responsible for integrating sensory inputs, while the inner ring coordinates motor responses. Specialized balance organs known as statocysts are also located between tentacles. Medusa also have both smooth and striated muscle that allows for the contractions necessary to swim smoothly through the water.

== Research use ==
Since C. hemisphaerica passes through planula, polyp, and medusa stages during its life cycle, it is regarded as a good model for studying how one genome can produce variable phenotypes. This is especially useful when considering that two of the more common Cnidarian model organisms, Hydra and Nematostella, do not have the same "complete' life-cycle that alternates between a vegetative polyp and sexually reproducing, free-swimming medusa form.

Clytia has characteristics that make it favorable for laboratory culture and experimental manipulation. All stages of Clytia's life cycle can be reproduced under laboratory conditions; polyp colonies, due to their essentially immortal nature, are easily maintained, and adult medusa can be fed with Artemia larvae. Adult male and female medusa spawn daily, and can be entrained with controlled light conditions to spawn at specific times. The oocytes, eggs, embryos, and planulae of Clytia are easily visualized under a microscope and, much like those of popular model organisms like sea urchins, the zygotes of C. hemisphaerica are relatively large (around 200 um in diameter) and can be microinjected to form transgenic planulae, polyp colonies, and medusa. Clytia is also unique in that its gonads can function autonomously; a gonad separated from an adult medusa will undergo oocyte development and ovulation under the same entrained light cues as would a gonad still attached to a medusa. Clytia medusa that are produced from a single polyp colony are also genetically identical, presenting a huge advantage for gene function analysis as well as genome sequencing.

Cnidarians are known for their ability to rapidly heal and regenerate their tissues, a function that C. hemisphaerica also possesses. This makes Clytia an ideal candidate for studying the dynamics of tissue regeneration and epithelial wound-healing in-vivo, since the organism's small size allows its healing process be filmed under a microscope in real-time.
