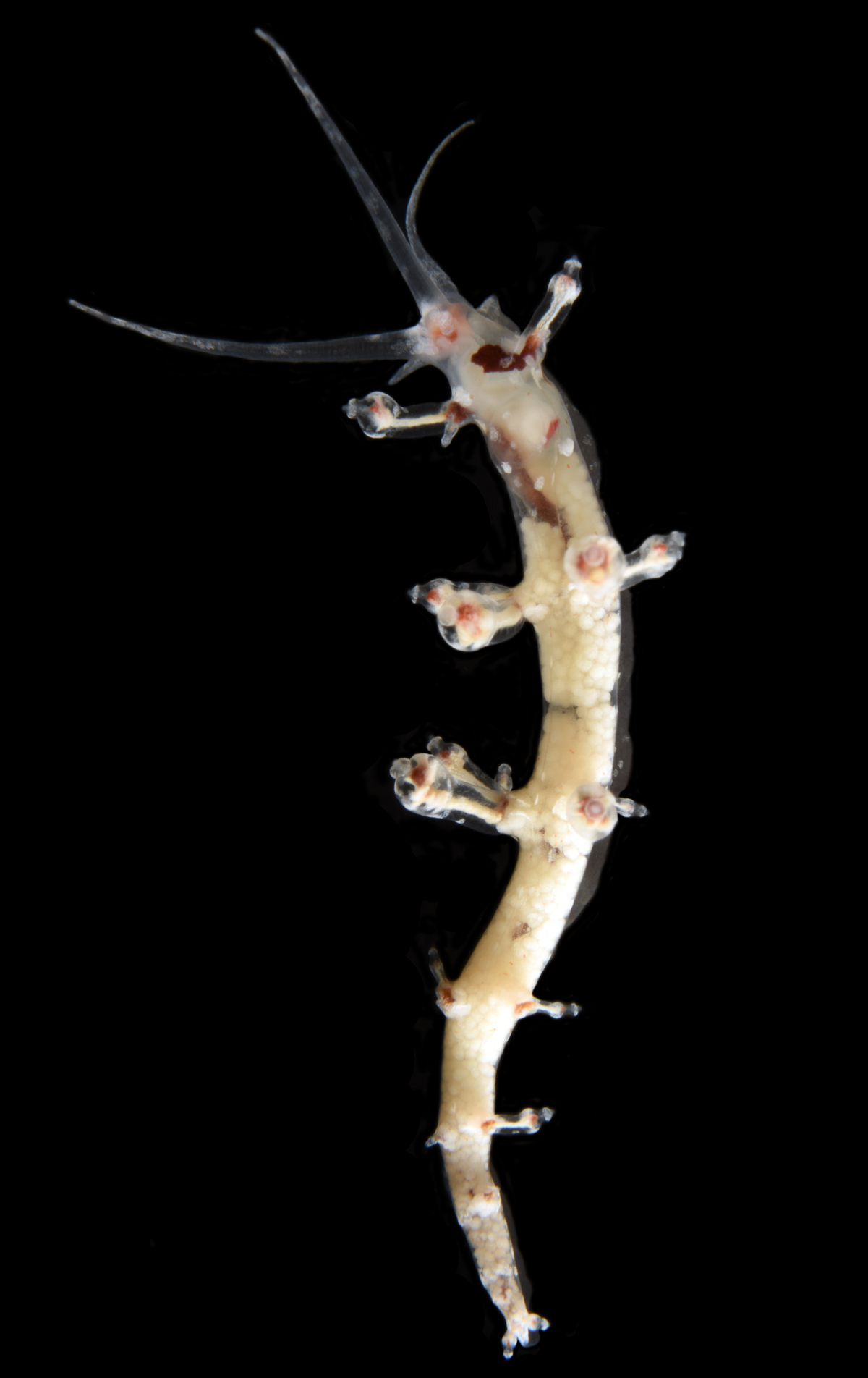
- Osezaki, Japan

Scientific classification
- Kingdom: Animalia
- Phylum: Mollusca
- Class: Gastropoda
- Order: Nudibranchia
- Suborder: Aeolidacea
- Family: Facelinidae
- Genus: Myja
- Species: M. hyotan

Binomial name
- Myja hyotan Martynov, Mehrotra, Chavanich, Nakano, Kashio, Lundin, Picton & Korshunova, 2019

= Myja hyotan =

Species of gastropod

Myja hyotan is a species of sea slug, an aeolid nudibranch, a marine gastropod mollusc in the family Facelinidae.

== Distribution ==
This species was described from a depth of 7–15 m (23–49 ft) at Osezaki, Japan, 35.028980°N 138.789830°E.

== Description ==
Myja hyotan is a slender nudibranch with unusual elongate cerata which mimic the polyps of its hydroid prey, Pennaria. It is similar to Myja longicornis but differs in the shape of the cerata, which in this species have a long stalk, then a large swelling, a constriction and another swelling tapering to the tip. It grows to 20 mm (0.79 in) in length.
