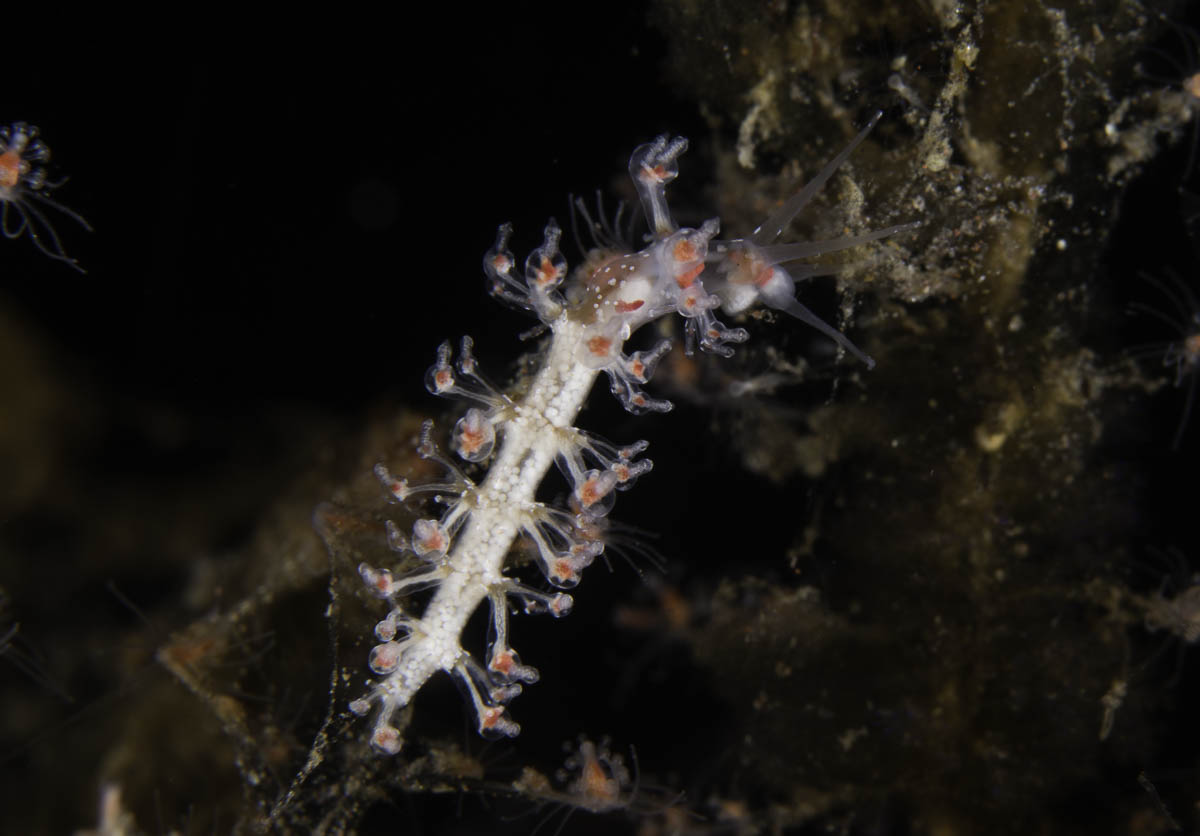
- Myja cf. longicornis

Scientific classification
- Kingdom: Animalia
- Phylum: Mollusca
- Class: Gastropoda
- Order: Nudibranchia
- Suborder: Aeolidacea
- Family: Facelinidae
- Genus: Myja; Bergh, 1896

= Myja =

Genus of gastropods

Myja is a genus of small, delicate sea slugs, aeolid nudibranchs, marine gastropod molluscs in the family Facelinidae.

== Species ==
Species within the genus Myja include:

- Myja hyotan Martynov, Mehrotra, Chavanich, Nakano, Kashio, Lundin, Picton & Korshunova, 2019
- Myja karin Martynov, Mehrotra, Chavanich, Nakano, Kashio, Lundin, Picton & Korshunova, 2019
- Myja longicornis Bergh, 1896
