= Hartlaubella =

Scientific classification
- Domain: Eukaryota
- Kingdom: Animalia
- Phylum: Cnidaria
- Class: Hydrozoa
- Order: Leptothecata
- Family: Campanulariidae
- Genus: Hartlaubella; Poche, 1914

Genus of aquatic animals

Hartlaubella is a genus of cnidarians belonging to the family Campanulariidae.

The species of this genus are found in Europe and Northern America.

Species:

- Hartlaubella gelatinosa (Pallas, 1766)
