= Laomedea flexuosa =

Scientific classification
- Domain: Eukaryota
- Kingdom: Animalia
- Phylum: Cnidaria
- Class: Hydrozoa
- Order: Leptothecata
- Family: Campanulariidae
- Genus: Laomedea
- Species: L. flexuosa

Binomial name
- Laomedea flexuosa Alder, 1857

Species of hydrozoan

Laomedea flexuosa is a species of cnidarians belonging to the family Campanulariidae.

It is native to Europe and Northern America.
