= Joshua Alder =

British cheesemonger and zoologist

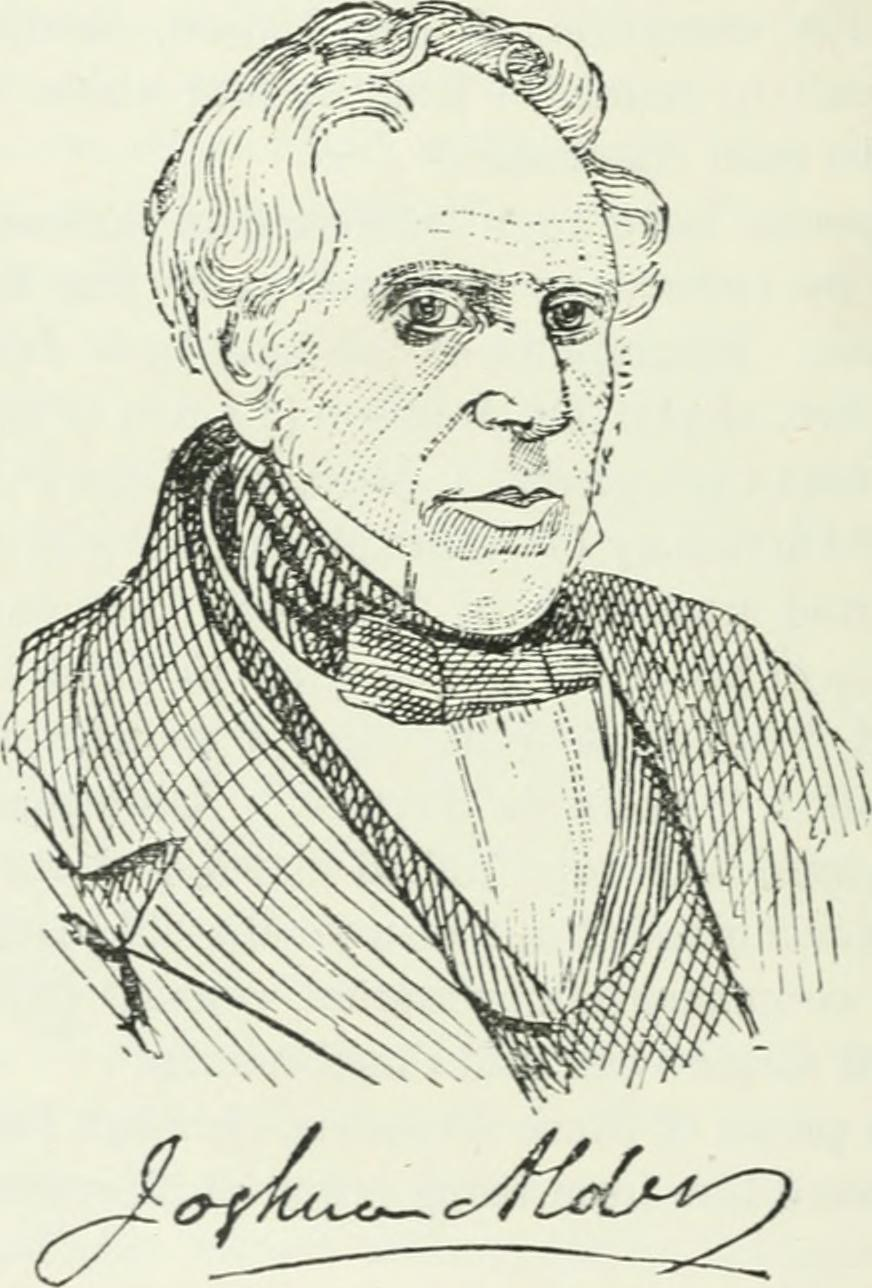
- Sketch of Alder from "Men of mark 'twixt Tyne and Tweed" by Richard Welford, 1895
- Born: 7 April 1792; Newcastle upon Tyne, England
- Died: 21 January 1867 (aged 74)
- Citizenship: British
- Occupation: Cheesemonger
- Scientific career
- Fields: zoologist

Joshua Alder (7 April 1792 – 21 January 1867) was a British cheesemonger and amateur zoologist and malacologist. As such, he specialized in the Tunicata, and in gastropods.

He was a member of the Natural History Society of Northumberland and Durham, and an early member of the Literary and Philosophical Society of Newcastle upon Tyne, alongside Joseph Swan and Robert Stephenson. He corresponded with Charles Darwin.

His drawings are in the collections of the Great North Museum: Hancock and the British Museum.

== Ravensworth Terrace ==
From 1841 to 1857 Alder was a tenant at 5 Ravensworth Terrace in the Summerhill area of Newcastle upon Tyne, which he shared with his sister Mary, a woman of independent means, and their two female servants.

During this time, he ran a cheese shop in The Side, a street in central Newcastle. He sold that business and became a shareholder in the Northumberland District Bank, and a gentleman of leisure. A financial crash in 1857 led to the collapse of the bank, and Alder faced ruin. He and Mary were forced to leave Ravensworth Terrace, moving to a smaller house, still extant, in nearby Summerhill Terrace, where he was supported by his sister. In 1863 he wrote to his co-author Albany Hancock of his relief at being awarded a pension of £70 from the civil list by Lord Palmerston at the behest of his scientific colleagues, allowing him to resume his research.

An obituary noted that he was "everywhere accompanied" by his sister, who "assisted him in his studies and was, in short, essential to his life and health".

Alder is profiled in the first episode of the second series of A House Through Time, first shown in April 2019. As a result of research conducted for the programme, a plaque commemorating Alder was unveiled there on 26 September 2018 by presenter David Olusoga and the Lord Mayor of Newcastle, David Down. The house has been Grade II listed since June 1976.

== Bibliography ==
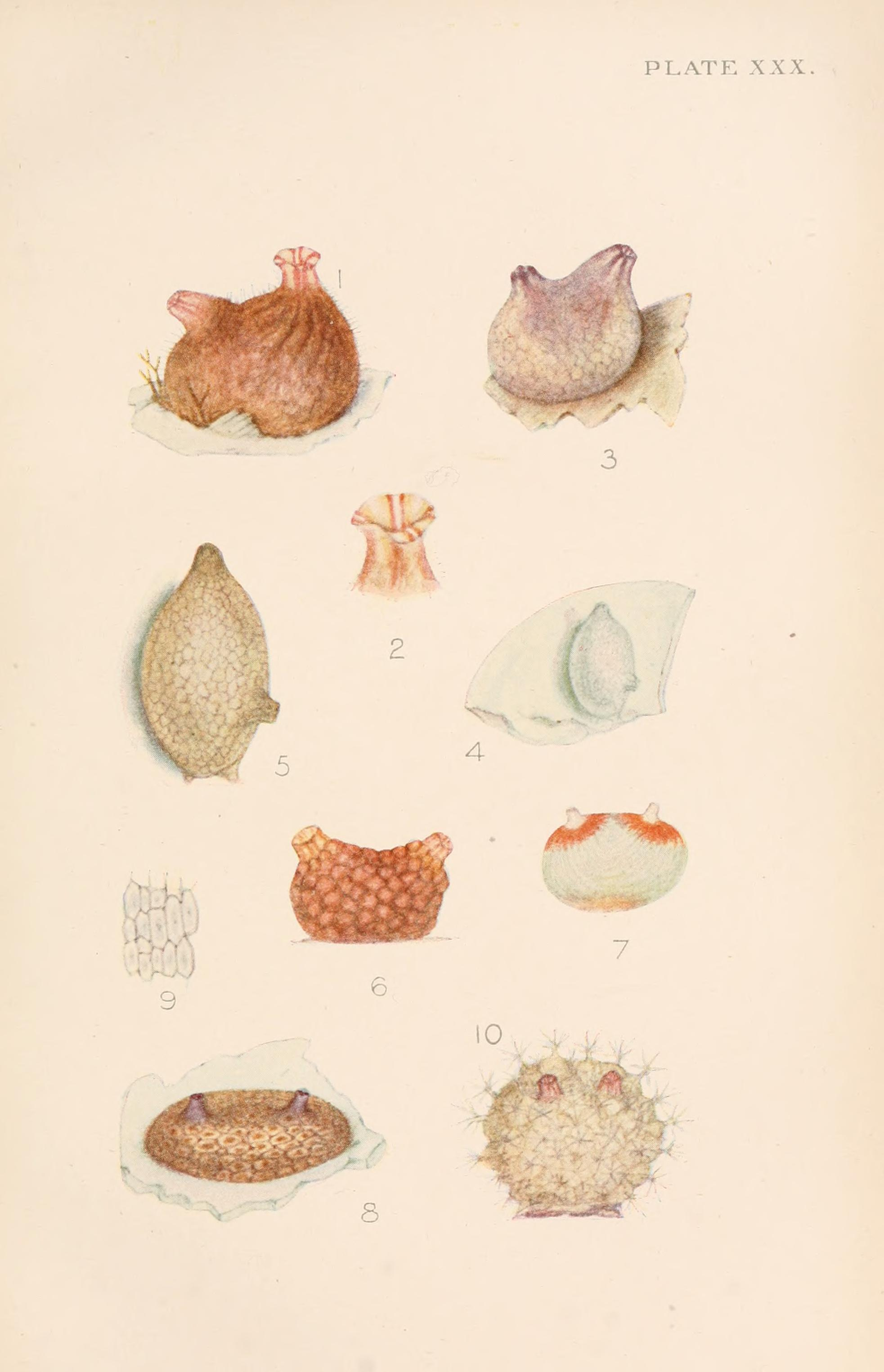
Plate from British Tunicata

- Alder J. (1838). "Supplement to a catalogue of the land and fresh-water testaceous Mollusca, found in the vicinity of Newcastle". Transactions of the Natural History Society of Northumberland and Durham 1(3): 337–342. Newcastle.
- Alder J. (1841). "Observations on the genus Polycera of Cuvier, with descriptions of two new British species". Annals and Magazine of Natural History. 6 (38): 337–342. doi:10.1080/03745484109442937.
- Alder J. & Hancock A. (1845–1855). A Monograph of the British Nudibranchiate Mollusca: with figures of all the species. The Ray Society, London. Published in 8 parts:
  - Alder J. & Hancock A. (1845) part 1. online
  - Alder J. & Hancock A. (1846) part 2.
  - Alder J. & Hancock A. (1847) part 3.
  - Alder J. & Hancock A. (1848) part 4.
  - Alder J. & Hancock A. (1851) part 5.
  - Alder J. & Hancock A. (1854) part 6.
  - Alder J. & Hancock A. (1855) part 7.
  - Eliot E. (1910) part 8 (suppl.)
- Alder J. & Hancock A. (October 1851). "Descriptions of two new species of nudibranchiate Mollusca, one of them forming the type of a new genus". Annals and Magazine of Natural History, 2nd ser., 8 (46): 290–302, pls. 9–10.
- Alder, Joshua, Embleton, Dennis, Hancock, Albany, Hopkinson, John, Norman, Alfred Merle, 1905–12 The British Tunicata; an unfinished monograph, by the late Joshua Alder and the late Albany Hancock. Edited by John Hopkinson, with a history of the work by the Rev. A. M. Norman. London. Printed for the Ray Society.

A contemporary review described the Monograph of the British Nudibranchiate Mollusca as "one of the most admirable monographs which has ever appeared in this or any other country". Prince Albert is known to have owned a copy.

== Taxa described ==
Alder discovered over 100 marine species, new to science.

Names or synonyms of hydroids described by Alder include:

- Dicoryne conferta (Alder, 1856)
- Eudendrium capillare Alder, 1856
- Hydractinia areolata Alder, 1862
- Corymorpha nana Alder, 1857
- Campanularia hincksii Alder, 1856
- Laomedea flexuosa Alder, 1857
- Laomedea neglecta Alder, 1856
- Halecium nanum Alder, 1859

Gastropod taxa described by Alder include:

- Ancula cristata (Alder, 1841)
- Polyceroidea Alder & Hancock, 1845
- Fiona Alder & Hancock, 1851
- Chromodoris Alder & Hancock, 1855
