= Gastroblasta =

Scientific classification
- Domain: Eukaryota
- Kingdom: Animalia
- Phylum: Cnidaria
- Class: Hydrozoa
- Order: Leptothecata
- Family: Campanulariidae
- Genus: Gastroblasta; Keller, 1883

Synonyms
- Multioralis Mayer, 1900

Genus of hydrozoans

Gastroblasta is a genus of cnidarians belonging to the family Campanulariidae.

The species of this genus are found in Southern Europe and Central America.

Species:

- Gastroblasta ovale (Mayer, 1900)
- Gastroblasta raffaelei Lang, 1886
- Gastroblasta timida Keller, 1883
