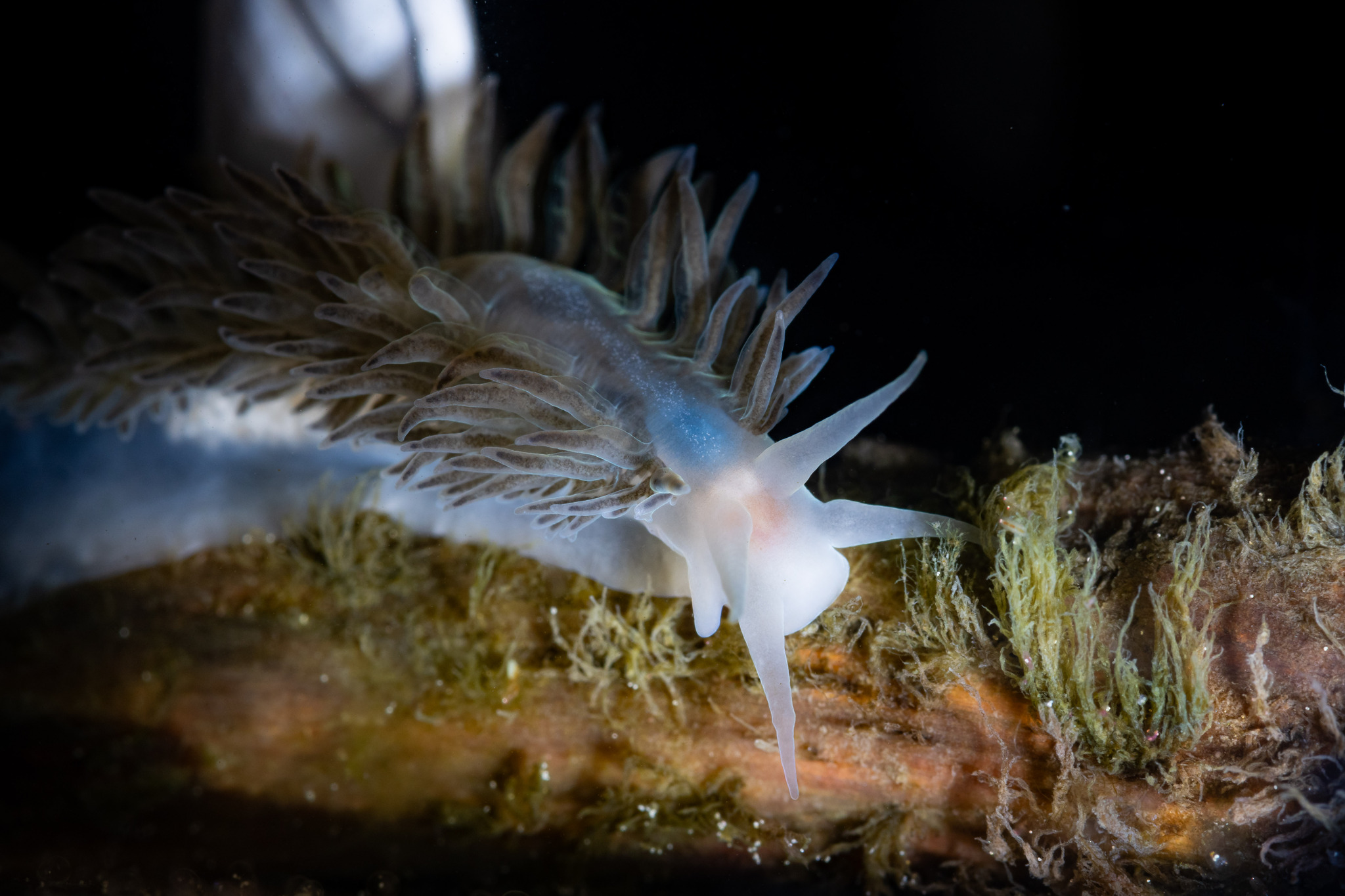
- Fiona pinnata

Scientific classification
- Kingdom: Animalia
- Phylum: Mollusca
- Class: Gastropoda
- Order: Nudibranchia
- Suborder: Aeolidacea
- Family: Fionidae
- Genus: Fiona; Alder & Hancock in Forbes & Hanley, 1853

= Fiona (gastropod) =

Genus of gastropods

Fiona is a genus of sea slugs, specifically aeolid nudibranchs, marine gastropod molluscs in the family Fionidae. Fiona is the type genus of the family Fionidae.

== Species ==
Species within the genus Fiona include:

- Fiona pinnata (Eschscholtz, 1831)

A study published in 2016 showed that Fiona pinnata is a species complex of at least three species.

== Ecology ==
Species of Fiona feed on goose barnacles and live on floating objects in the oceans worldwide.
