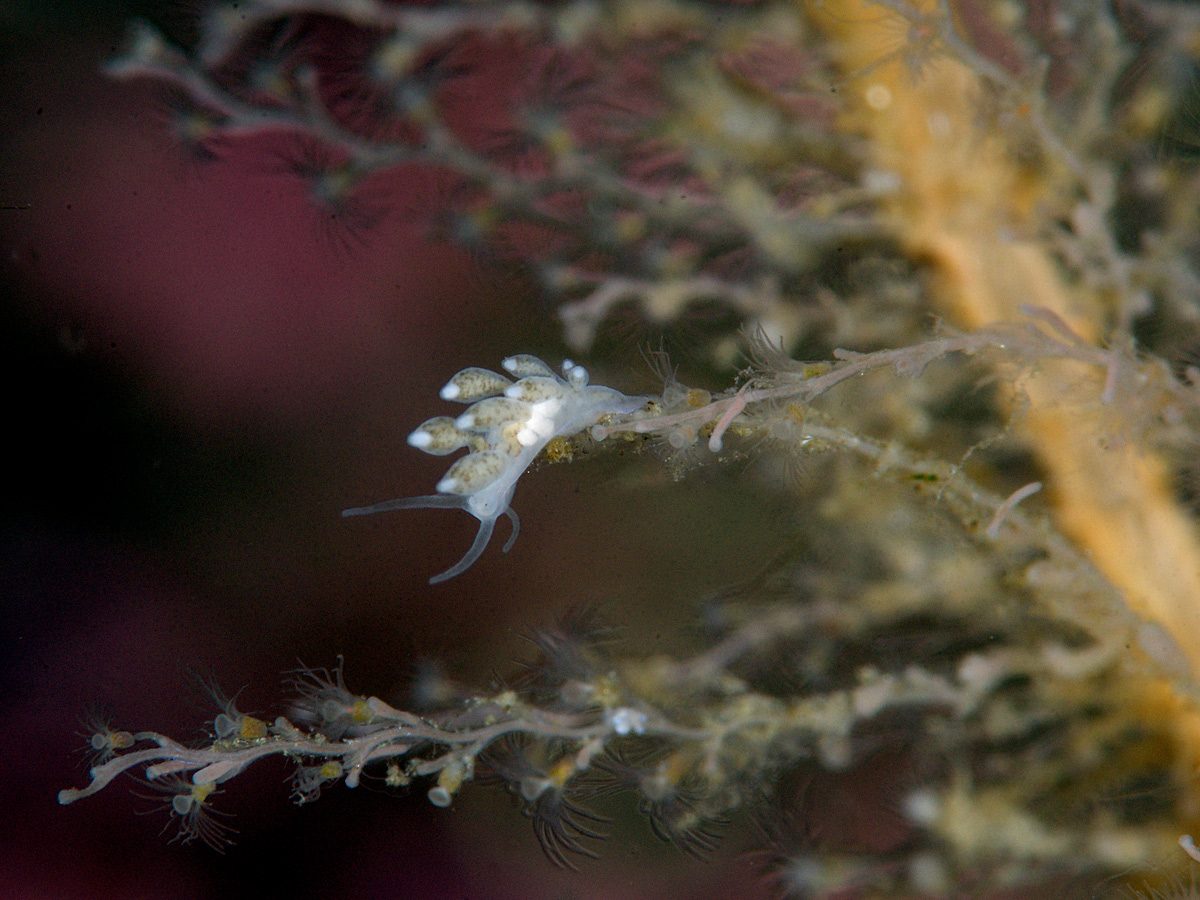
- The nudibranch Tergipes tergipes, Gulen Dive Centre, Norway.

Scientific classification
- Kingdom: Animalia
- Phylum: Mollusca
- Class: Gastropoda
- Order: Nudibranchia
- Suborder: Aeolidacea
- Family: Tergipedidae
- Genus: Tergipes; Cuvier, 1805

= Tergipes =

Genus of gastropods

Tergipes is a genus of sea slugs, specifically aeolid nudibranchs, marine gastropod molluscs in the family Tergipedidae. Tergipes is the type genus of the family Tergipedidae.

== Species ==
Species within the genus Tergipes include:

- Tergipes antarcticus Pelseneer, 1903
- Tergipes edwardsii Nordmann, 1844
- Tergipes tergipes (Forsskål in Niebuhr, 1775)

Species names currently considered to be synonyms:

- Tergipes adspersus Nordmann, 1845 synonym of Tenellia adspersa (Nordmann, 1845)
- Tergipes affinis d'Orbigny, 1837 synonym of Doto affinis (d'Orbigny, 1837)
- Tergipes capellinii Trinchese, 1879 synonym of Eubranchus capellinii (Trinchese, 1879)
- Tergipes despectus (Johnston, 1835) synonym of Tergipes tergipes (Forsskål in Niebuhr, 1775)
- Tergipes doriae (Trinchese, 1874) synonym of Capellinia doriae (Trinchese, 1874)
- Tergipes fustifer Lovén, 1846 synonym of Capellinia fustifera (Lovén, 1846)
- Tergipes lacinulatus de Blainville, 1824 synonym of Tergipes tergipes (Forsskål in Niebuhr, 1775)
- Tergipes lacinulatus (Gmelin, 1791) synonym of Doris lacinulata Gmelin, 1791
- Tergipes pulcher Johnston, 1834 synonym of Limacia clavigera (O. F. Müller, 1776)
- Tergipes rupium Møller, 1842 synonym of Eubranchus rupium (Møller, 1842)
- Tergipes valentini (Eliot, 1907) synonym of Cuthona valentini

== Ecology ==
Species of Tergipes feed on hydroids, as reflected by the serrated radula. A recent study showed that Tergipes tergipes is an amphi-atlantic species.
