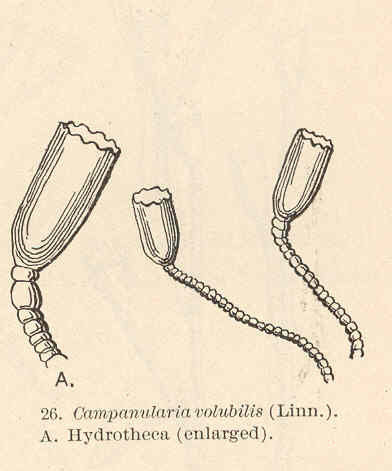
- Campanularia volubilis

Scientific classification
- Kingdom: Animalia
- Phylum: Cnidaria
- Class: Hydrozoa
- Order: Leptothecata
- Family: Campanulariidae
- Genus: Campanularia; Lamarck, 1816

Species
- See text

= Campanularia =

Genus of hydrozoans

Campanularia is a genus of hydrozoans, in the family Campanulariidae.

== Species ==
- Campanularia abyssa Fraser, 1940
- Campanularia africana Stechow, 1923
- Campanularia agas Cornelius, 1982
- Campanularia ambiplica Mulder & Trebilcock, 1914
- Campanularia antarctica Ritchie, 1913
- Campanularia brevicaulis Nutting, 1915
- Campanularia breviscyphia Sars, 1857
- Campanularia certidens Fraser, 1947
- Campanularia compressima Kubota & Yamada, 1992
- Campanularia costata (Gravier-Bonnet, 1979)
- Campanularia crenata Allman, 1876
- Campanularia denticulata Clark, 1877
- Campanularia diverticulata (Totton, 1930)
- Campanularia erythraea (Stechow, 1923)
- Campanularia fusiformis Clark, 1876
- Campanularia gaussica Stechow, 1923
- Campanularia gracilis Allman, 1876
- Campanularia groenlandica Levinsen, 1893
- Campanularia hicksoni Totton, 1930
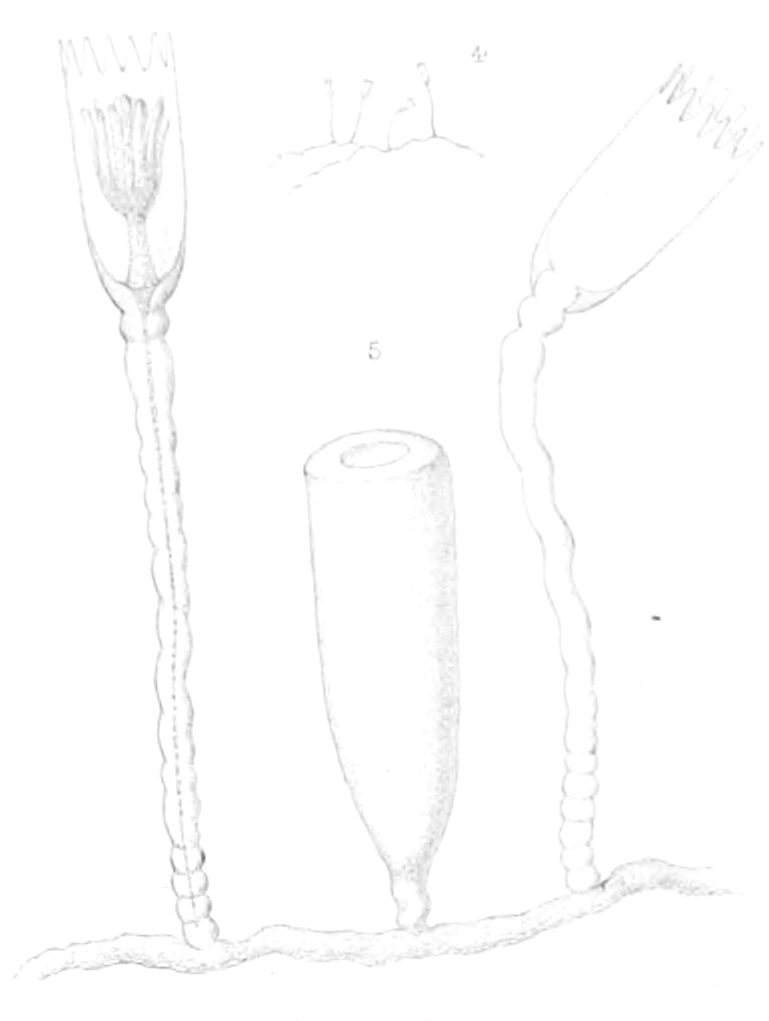
  ?Campanularia hicksoni 4) habitus of colony, 5) branch section with 2 hydrothecae (one showing hydranth) and a gonangium
- Campanularia hincksii Alder, 1856
- Campanularia indopacifica Stechow, 1919
- Campanularia laminacarpa Millard, 1966
- Campanularia lennoxensis Jäderholm, 1903
- Campanularia macroscypha Allman, 1877
- Campanularia morgansi Millard, 1957
- Campanularia nodosa Stechow, 1923
- Campanularia nuytsensis Watson, 2003
- Campanularia pecten Gow & Millard, 1975
- Campanularia pumila Bale, 1914
- Campanularia pygmaea Clark, 1875
- Campanularia retroflexa Allman, 1888
- Campanularia roberti Gow & Millard, 1975
- Campanularia sulcata Jäderholm, 1896
- Campanularia tulipifera Allman, 1888
- Campanularia volubilis (Linnaeus, 1758)
