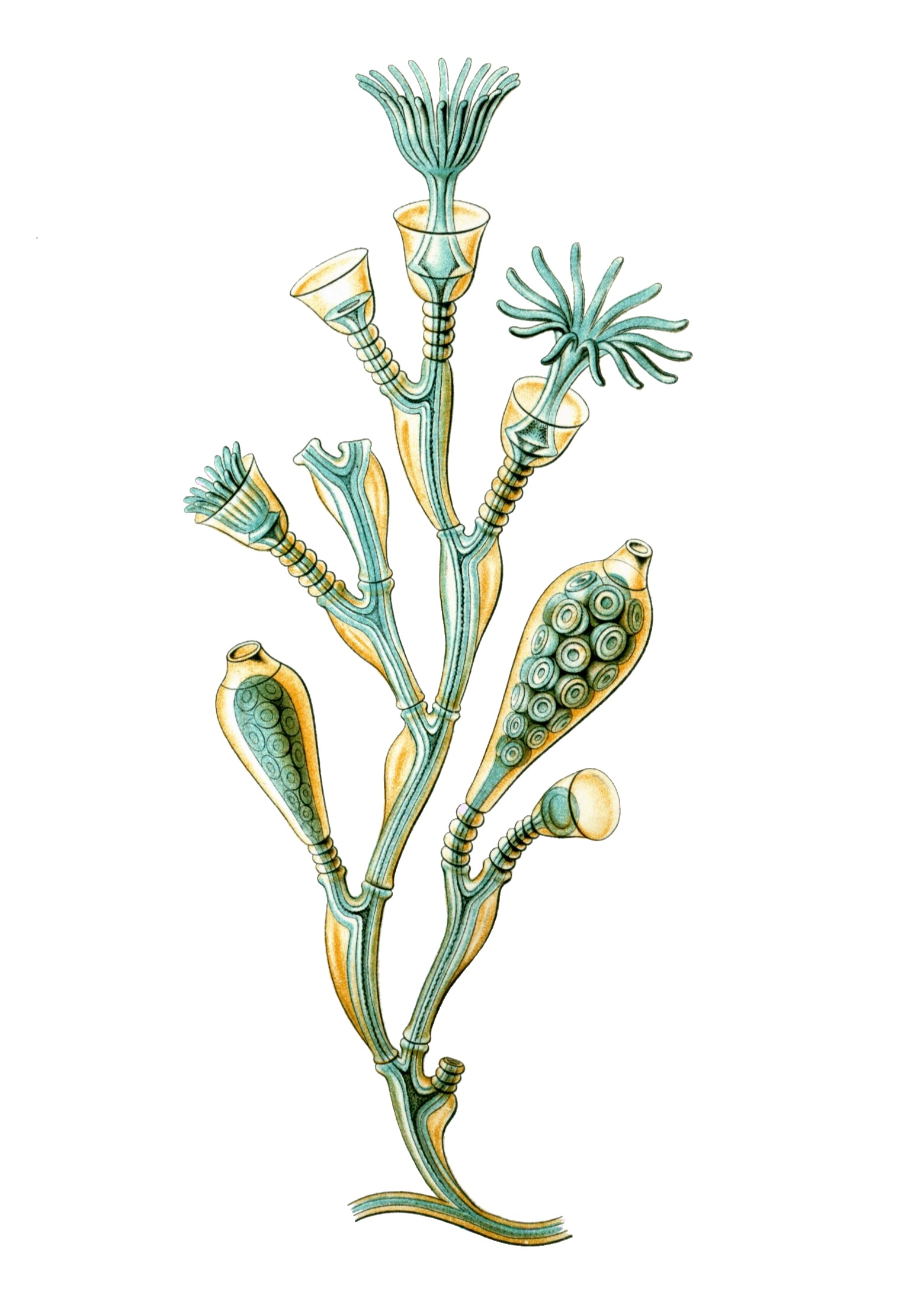

Scientific classification
- Kingdom: Animalia
- Phylum: Cnidaria
- Class: Hydrozoa
- Order: Leptothecata
- Family: Campanulariidae
- Genus: Obelia
- Species: O. geniculata

Binomial name
- Obelia geniculata (Linnaeus, 1758)

= Obelia geniculata =

Species of cnidarian

Obelia geniculata is a species of cnidarian belonging to the family Campanulariidae. Its common name is the Knotted Thread Hydroid.

The species has cosmopolitan distribution.

== Population genetics ==
Estimates of divergence times and distinctive haplotypes provide evidence of glacial refugia around Iceland and southeastern Canada. In one study, O. geniculata was first documented in these areas in the 1990s but were later found in Massachusetts and Japan in the 2000s. There are three reciprocally monophyletic clades of Obelia, one branch for the North Atlantic, one for Japan, and one for New Zealand. There seems to be an ancestral haplotype that occurs in the North Atlantic populations from Massachusetts, New Brunswick, and Iceland. The population from Woods Hole, MA shows less genetic diversity than the New Brunswick population. The more recent expansion of these haplotypes demonstrates the southward movement of hydroid populations, possibly due to climate change. The North Atlantic populations contain ancestral haplotypes, which differ from the populations in Japan and New Zealand. Pacific populations have more haplotype diversity than all four of the North Atlantic populations, which indicates that the North Atlantic population is more recently established than the Pacific population. The minimum estimated age of the New Brunswick population is between 47 and 143 thousand years old. Including the Massachusetts population, this number is between 82 and 150 thousand years, but Iceland has the oldest estimated population with the minimum age ranging from 68 to 204 thousand years old.

Obelia are distinguishable from others in Campanulariidae from their size in length and diameter, as well as their smaller hydrothecal cusps and relatively thinner perisarc thickness. Some morphological traits are hard to distinguish across species, so observing a combination of these traits will help with identification. Other useful observable characteristics are branching pattern of colonies and length of trophosome. There are variations and exceptions to these, which makes identification even more difficult. O. geniculata is characterized by a thicker perisarc with more variation that other species of Obelia. O. longissima have longer first and second order branches, in addition to a greater variation in hydrothecal cusp length than others in the genus. O. bidentata differs from the previous species due to their more cylindrical and longer hydrothecal cusps.

== Structure ==
O. geniculata have two distinct forms – polyp and medusa, also known as hydranths and gonangia, respectively.

The horizontal portion of the hydranth is called the hydrorhiza. The hydrorhiza is the structure that attaches to the other hydranths as well as the substrate. For O. geniculata, the substrate is almost always leaves of plants since it is an epiphytic organism. The vertical portion or main stalk of the hydranth form is called the hydrocalus, and it has two layers – the coenosarc and the perisarc. The coenosarc is the internal tube, containing the coelenteron, and the perisarc is the external layer secreted by the ectoderm. The mesoglea is located between these two layers. O. geniculata are distinguished from other Obelia species by the thickness of the perisarc; the perisarc on O. geniculata is much thicker than other species. Branches of the hydranth stem from the hydrocalus, and each has a zooid at the end. There are two types of zooids: gastro-zooids and blastostyles. Gastro-zooids are feeding buds and make up the majority of the buds in the colony. The manubrium is hollow, contains the mouth, and is located at the distal end of the body and is surrounded by approximately 24 feeding tentacles. The hydrotheca is at the base of the gastro-zooid. It is a form of the perisarc. Blastostyles have no tentacles or mouth, a gonotheca instead of a hydrotheca, and a reduced coelenteron.

The gonangia is the result of the medusa buds being released from the hydranth blastostyles. The body plan of the gonangia is fairly simple: the main body is shaped like a convex umbrella, with the manubrium hanging from the concave underside. The mouth is at the terminal end of the manubrium. In a newly-formed gonangia, there are 16 tentacles, but that can increase as they develop more. The mouth leads into the coelenteron, similarly to the hydranth, which then branches into 4 radial canals. The canals take the food around the entire body of the gonangia for full digestion. The endoderm of the gonangia is the inner lining to the canal system. The mesoglea can be found in the manubrium in between the endo- and ectoderm. The gonangia is also able to produce bioluminescence through a photoprotein called obelin. For O. geniculata, the fluorescence is blue (λmax = 495 nm).

O. geniculata have no systems for excretion, circulation, or respiration. Both waste excretion and oxygen intake occur from gas exchange across the body surface.

== Reproduction ==
O. geniculata reproduce asexually through the budding of blastostyles. When the medusa buds are ready to be released from the blastostyle, the lateral wall will burst at the distal end. When the buds are free-floating, they are then classified as the gonangia.

Gonangia reproduce sexually through broadcast spawning. Male and female gonangia will release their sperm and eggs into the water, and fertilized zygotes undergo complete cleavage until they become planular larvae. These planulae will then swim through the water until they find their spot on the substrate, and eventually grow into hydranths.

== Feeding ==
Colonies of O. geniculata are sessile, so they feed through suspension feeding. In the polyp stage, feeding hydranths use their tentacles to bring food towards their mouths. Research has shown that the mouth opening and tentacle contraction are both governed by spontaneous electrical potentials, rather than knowingly. The ends of the tentacles have nematocysts, which help in catching and stunning prey. O. geniculata are typically voracious predators, and can consume a wide variety of bacteria, crustacean zooplankton, and icthyplankton. O. geniculata gonangia have also been seen to digest fecal pellets. In situations of food stress, where the colonies are not getting enough food to sustain themselves, some research has shown that hydranths can create more gastro-zooids to increase the chances of getting food. In areas of upwelling, O. geniculata are more abundant because of the increase in food availability.

== Epiphytism ==
O. genicula are classified as epiphytic, meaning they encrust on plants in the water. Since they have a cosmopolitan distribution, meaning they are found basically everywhere, this can be hard for agriculture. In Korea, colonies of O. geniculata were found to infest areas of Saccharina japonica, a kelp that is widely consumed by humans in China and Japan. When there is too much O. geniculata encrusted on the kelp, it is no longer deemed suitable for human consumption by degrading the taste and quality. In Spain, O. geniculata was the most abundant epiphyte on two other types of kelp - Undaria pinnatifida and Saccharina latissima.
