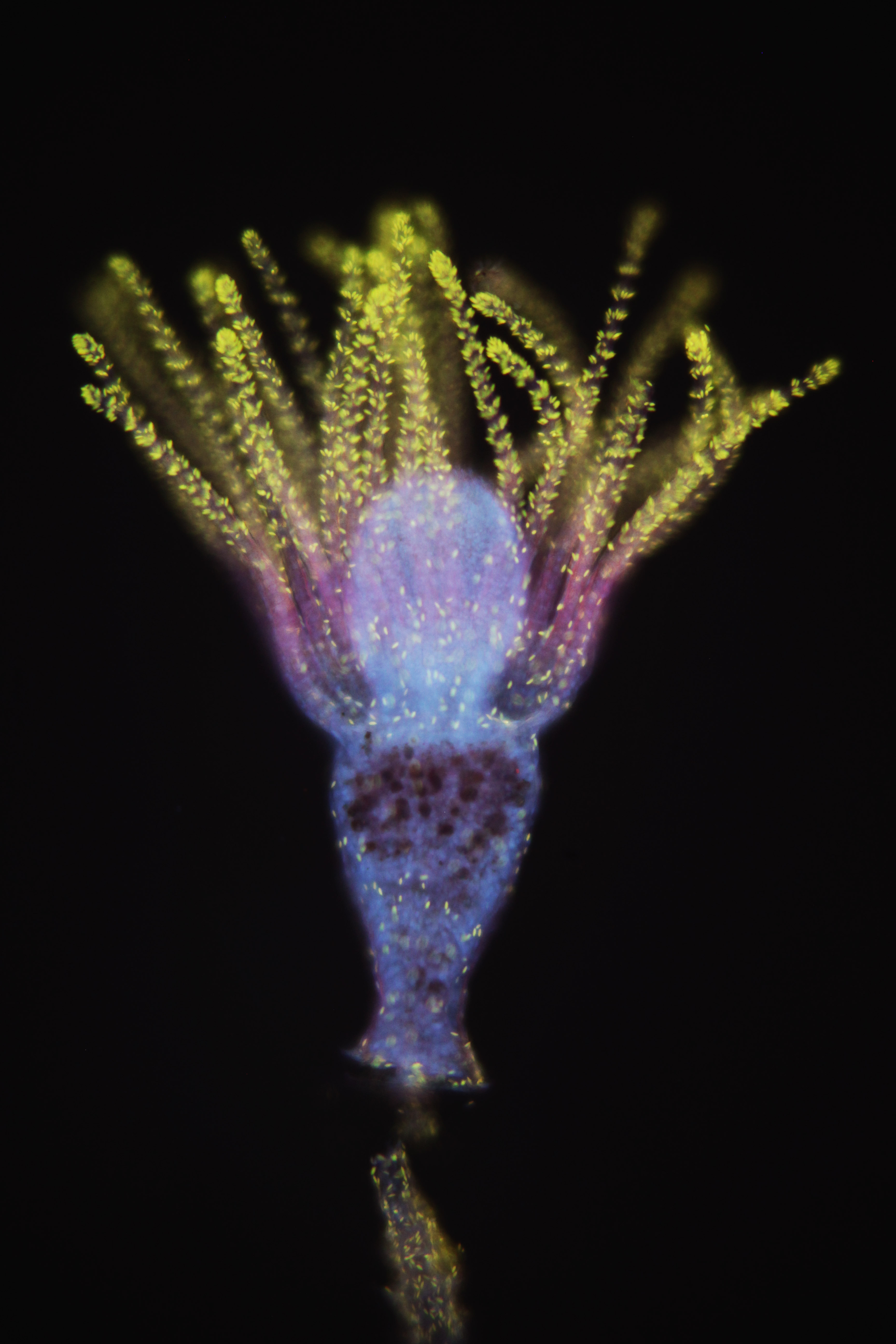
- Single polyp of Gonothyraea loveni

Scientific classification
- Domain: Eukaryota
- Kingdom: Animalia
- Phylum: Cnidaria
- Class: Hydrozoa
- Order: Leptothecata
- Family: Campanulariidae
- Genus: Gonothyraea; Allman, 1864

= Gonothyraea =

Genus of marine invertebrates

Gonothyraea is a genus of cnidarians belonging to the family Campanulariidae.

The genus has cosmopolitan distribution.

Species:

- Gonothyraea inornata Nutting, 1901
- Gonothyraea loveni (Allman, 1859)
