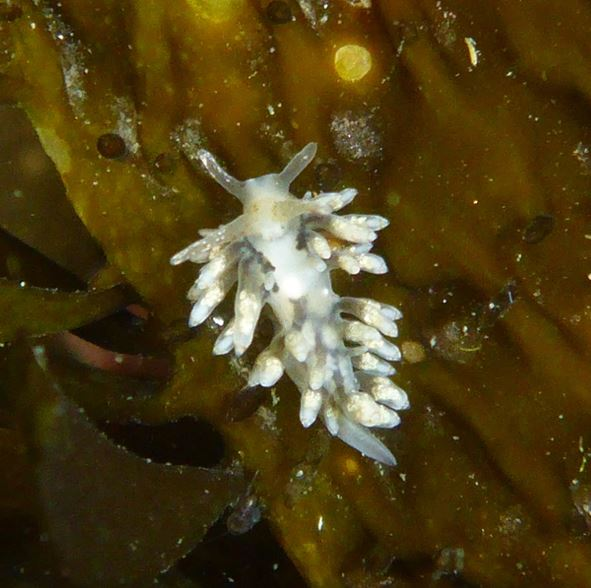

Scientific classification
- Kingdom: Animalia
- Phylum: Mollusca
- Class: Gastropoda
- Order: Nudibranchia
- Suborder: Aeolidacea
- Genus: Eubranchulus
- Species: E. rupium

Binomial name
- Eubranchulus rupium (Møller, 1842)

Synonyms
- Eubranchus rupium Møller, 1842; Galvina rupium Møller, 1842; Nudibranchus rupium Møller, 1842; Tergipes rupium Møller, 1842

= Eubranchulus rupium =

Green balloon aeolid

Species of gastropod

Eubranchulus rupium, the green balloon aeolid, is a species of sea slug or nudibranch, a marine gastropod mollusc in the family Eubranchidae.

== Distribution ==
This species was described from Greenland. It is reported from the North Atlantic Ocean as far south as the Netherlands and is considered to be a circumpolar species. It is considered by most authors to be a synonym of Eubranchus olivaceus and is reported as far south as Monterey Bay, California on the Pacific Ocean coast of North America.

== Biology ==
This nudibranch feeds on the hydroids Laomedea longissima.
