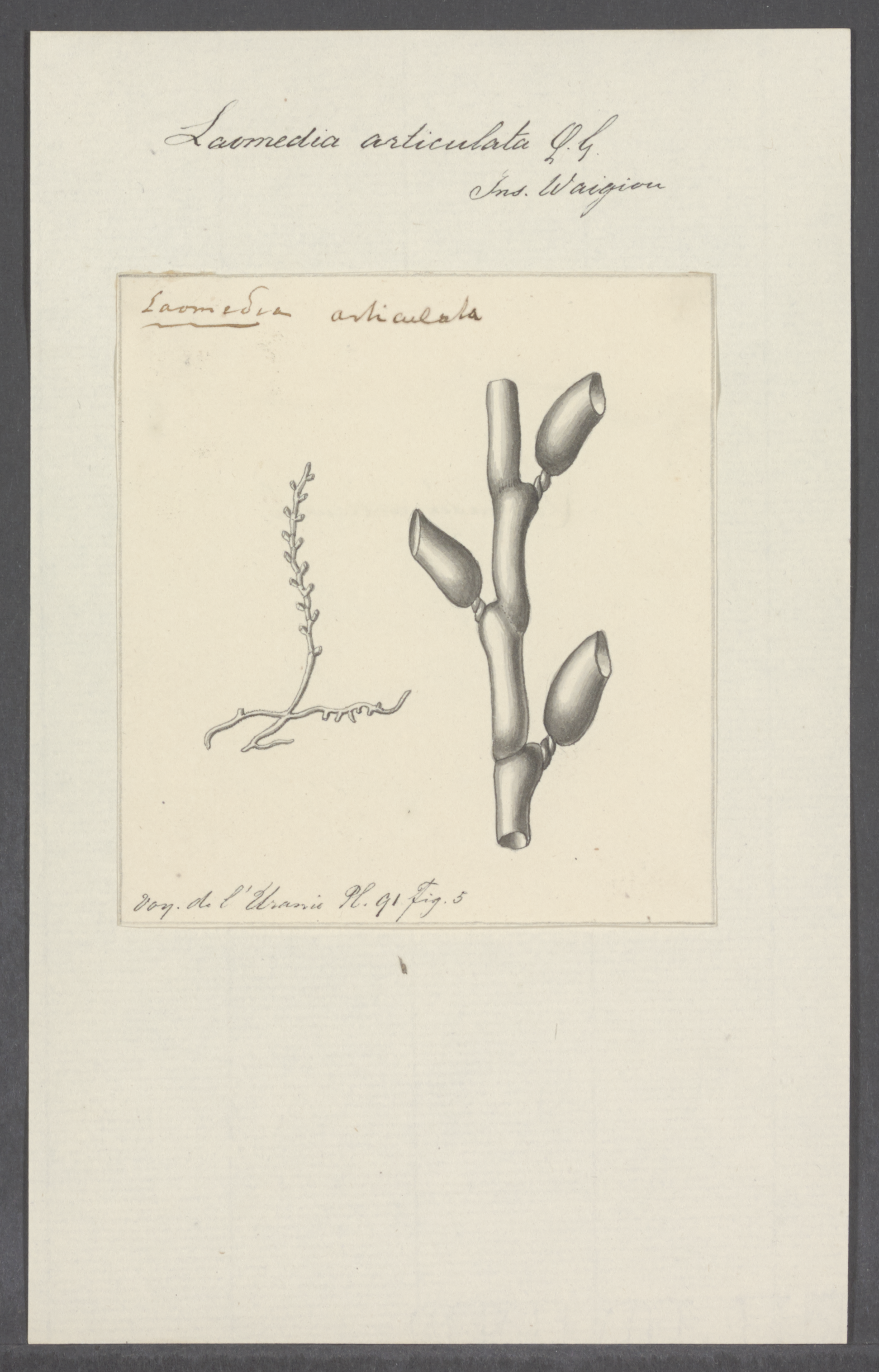
- Laomedea Articulata

Scientific classification
- Kingdom: Animalia
- Phylum: Cnidaria
- Class: Hydrozoa
- Order: Leptothecata
- Family: Campanulariidae
- Genus: Laomedea; De Haan

Species
- Laomedia astacina De Haan; Laomedia barronensis Ngoc-Ho & Yaldwyn; Laomedia healyi Yaldwyn & Wear; Laomedia paucispinosa Ngoc-Ho

= Laomedea =

Genus of hydrozoans

Laomedea is a genus of Cnidaria of the family Leptothecata. The genus was described by Lamouroux in 1812.
