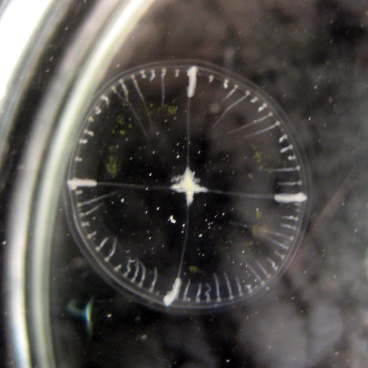
- Clytia gregaria

Scientific classification
- Kingdom: Animalia
- Phylum: Cnidaria
- Class: Hydrozoa
- Order: Leptothecata
- Family: Campanulariidae
- Genus: Clytia; Lamouroux, 1812

= Clytia (cnidarian) =

Genus of aquatic animals

Clytia is a genus of marine hydrozoans belonging to the family Campanulariidae. The genus has cosmopolitan distribution.

The subgenera Clytia (Platypyxis) L. Agassiz, 1862 and Clytia (Trochopyxis) L. Agassiz, 1862 are no longer recognized, whereas the subgenus Clytia (Orthopyxis) L. Agassiz, 1862 is accepted as its own genus, Orthopyxis.

== Species ==
There are 56 recognized species:

- Clytia ambigua (Agassiz & Mayer, 1899)
- Clytia arborescens Pictet, 1893
- Clytia brevicyatha Mammen, 1965
- Clytia brevithecata (Thornely, 1900)
- Clytia brunescens (Bigelow, 1904)
- Clytia crenata Mammen, 1965
- Clytia delicatula (Thornely, 1900)
- Clytia discoida (Mayer, 1900)
- Clytia edentula Gibbons & Ryland, 1989
- Clytia elongata Marktanner-Turneretscher, 1890
- Clytia elsaeoswaldae Stechow, 1914
- Clytia exilis Fraser, 1948
- Clytia fascicularis Fraser, 1938
- Clytia folleata (McCrady, 1859)
- Clytia gelatinosa (Mayer, 1900)
- Clytia globosa (Mayer, 1900)
- Clytia gracilicaulis (Fraser, 1938)
- Clytia gracilis (M. Sars, 1851)
- Clytia gregaria (Agassiz, 1862)
- Clytia gulangensis He & Zheng, 2015
- Clytia hemisphaerica (Linnaeus, 1767)
- Clytia hexacanalis Xu, Huang & Chen, 1991
- Clytia iridescens (Maas, 1906)
- Clytia irregularis Fraser, 1938
- Clytia islandica (Kramp, 1919)
- Clytia joycei Calder, 2019
- Clytia kincaidi (Nutting, 1899)
- Clytia laxa Fraser, 1937
- Clytia liguiliformis Mammen, 1965
- Clytia linearis (Thorneley, 1900)
- Clytia lomae (Torrey, 1909)
- Clytia macrocarpa Fraser, 1938
- Clytia macrogonia Bouillon, 1984
- Clytia macrotheca (Perkins, 1908)
- Clytia malayense (Kramp, 1961)
- Clytia mccradyi (Brooks, 1888)
- Clytia multiannulata Hirohito, 1995
- Clytia multidentata Fraser, 1938
- Clytia noliformis (McCrady, 1859) sensu Calder, 1991
- Clytia pacifica (Agassiz & Mayer, 1899)
- Clytia paradoxa (Stechow, 1923)
- Clytia paulensis (Vanhöffen, 1910)
- Clytia pearsonensis Watson, 1973
- Clytia rangiroae (Agassiz & Mayer, 1902)
- Clytia reloncavia Galea & Schories, 2012
- Clytia seriata Fraser, 1938
- Clytia sibogae Billard, 1917
- Clytia simplex (Browne, 1902)
- Clytia singulare (Mayer, 1900)
- Clytia stechowi Hargitt, 1927
- Clytia thornelyi (Nutting, 1927)
- Clytia trigona Pictet, 1893
- Clytia uchidai (Kramp, 1961)
- Clytia universitatis Torrey, 1904
- Clytia warreni Stechow, 1919
- Clytia xiamenensis Zhou et al., 2013
