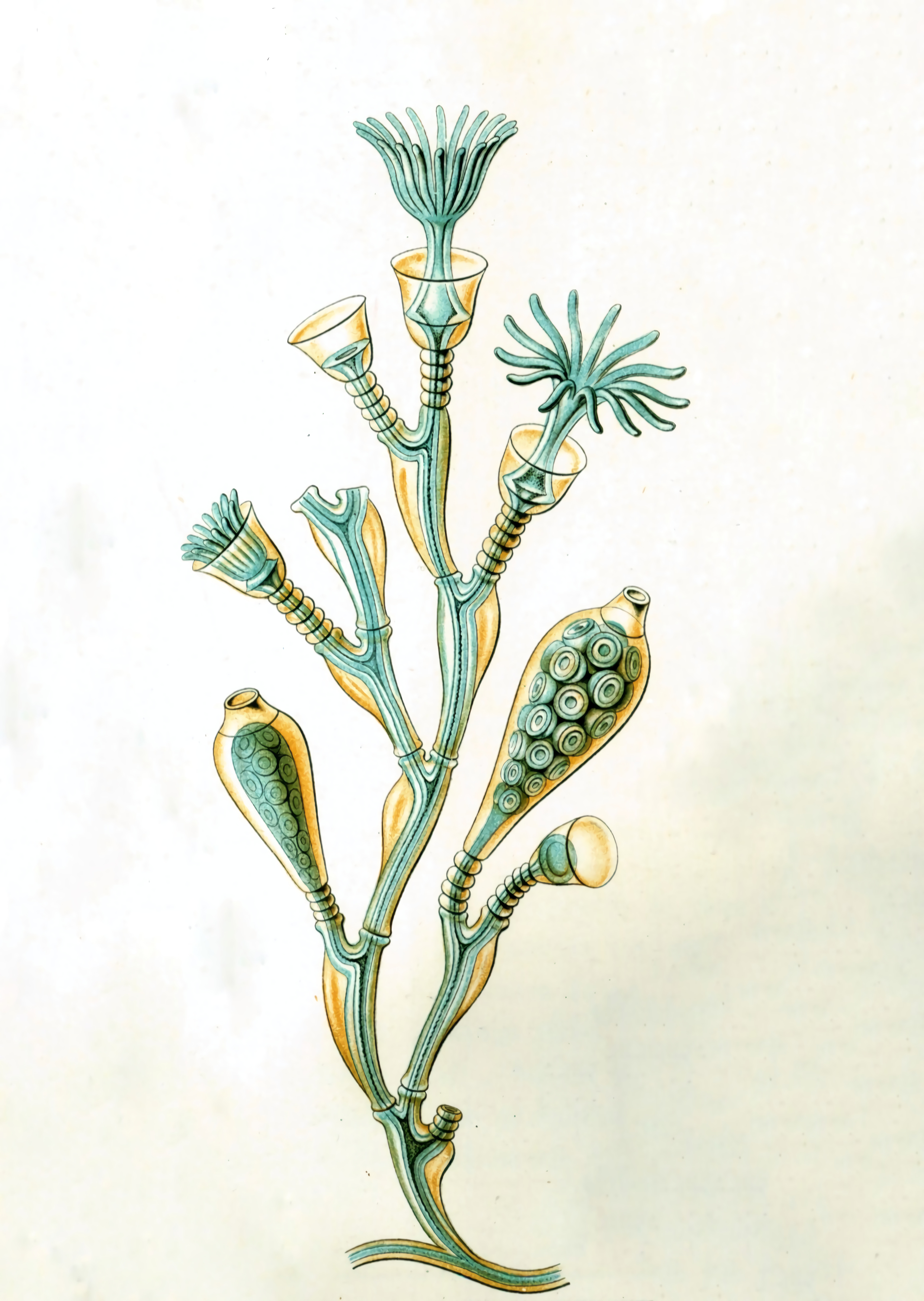

Scientific classification
- Kingdom: Animalia
- Phylum: Cnidaria
- Class: Hydrozoa
- Order: Leptothecata
- Family: Campanulariidae
- Genus: Obelia; Peron and Lesueur, 1810

Species
- Obelia dichotoma; Obelia geniculata; Obelia bidentata; Obelia longissima

= Obelia =

Genus of hydrozoans

Obelia is a genus of hydrozoans, a class of mainly marine and some freshwater animal species that have both polyp and medusa stages in their life cycle. Hydrozoa belongs to the phylum Cnidaria, which are aquatic (mainly marine) organisms that are relatively simple in structure with a diameter around 1 mm. There are currently 120 known species, with more to be discovered. These species are grouped into three broad categories: O. bidentata, O. dichotoma, and O. geniculata. O. longissima was later accepted as a legitimate species, but taxonomy regarding the entire genus is debated over.

Obelia is also called sea fur.

Obelia has a worldwide distribution except the high-Arctic and Antarctic seas. and a stage of Obelia species are common in coastal and offshore plankton around the world. Obelia are usually found no deeper than 200 metres (660 ft) from the water's surface, growing in intertidal rock pools and at the extreme low water of spring tides.

== Life cycle ==
The polyp colony reproduces asexually. During this stage of life, Obelia are confined to substrate surfaces. In mature colonies there are individual hydranths called gastrozooids, which can be found expanded or contracted, to aid in the growth of this organism by feeding. The reproductive polyp gonozooids have medusa buds. These medusa buds differentiate Obelia from others in the family Campanulariidae because development begins from a bud within the gonotheca. Eventually the buds are lost, and subsequent development shares resemblances with other hydranths. Other hydranths are specialized for defense. The main stalky body of the colony is composed of a coenosarc, which is covered by a protective perisarc.

The next generation of the life cycle begins when the medusae are released from the gonozooids, producing free swimming male only medusae velum with gonads, a mouth, and tentacles. The physical appearance of the male and female medusae velum, including their gonads, are indistinguishable, and the sex can only be determined by observing the inside of the gonads, which will either contain sperm or eggs. The medusae reproduce sexually, releasing sperm and eggs that fertilize to form a zygote, which later morphs into a blastula, then a ciliated swimming larva called a planula.

The planulae are free-swimming for a while but eventually attach themselves to some solid surface, where they begin their reproductive phase of life. Once attached to a substrate, a planula quickly develops into one feeding polyp. As the polyp grows, it begins developing branches of other feeding individuals, thus forming a new generation of polyps by asexual budding.

== Structure ==
Through its life cycle, Obelia take on two forms: polyp and medusa. They are diploblastic, with two true tissue layers—an epidermis (ectodermis) and a gastrodermis (endodermis)—with a jelly-like mesoglea filling the area between the two true tissue layers. They carry a nerve net with no brain or ganglia. A gastrovascular cavity is present where the digestion starts and later becomes intracellular. They have incomplete digestive tracts where the food enters, is digested, and expelled through the same opening. Scientists are trying to pinpoint their food preferences, but experiments have shown Obelia feeding on crustaceans under lab conditions, and ciliates.

Some species of Obelia are known to ingest tintinnids and other microplanktonic grazers. During the polyp stage, the mouth is situated at the top of the body, surrounded by tentacles, whereas during the medusa stage, the mouth is situated at the distal end of the main body structure. Four gonads lie in this main body structure, or manubrium.

Food is caught with the tentacles, then directed to the manubrium; sometimes food lands directly onto the manubrium and is consumed that way. The food is then distributed through a canal system, consisting of four radial canals and an outer ring. Defense and the capture of prey are helped by unique stinging cells called cnidocytes that contain nematocysts triggered by the cnidocil. It has a ridge-like structure on the inner margin, called a velum. If the velum is present, it is called a craspedote medusa.

== Phylogeny ==
Estimates of divergence times and distinctive haplotypes provide evidence of glacial refugia around Iceland and southeastern Canada. In one study, O. geniculata was first documented in these areas in the 1990s but were later found in Massachusetts and Japan in the 2000s. There are three reciprocally monophyletic clades of Obelia, one branch for the North Atlantic, one for Japan, and one for New Zealand. There seems to be an ancestral haplotype that occurs in the North Atlantic populations from Massachusetts, New Brunswick, and Iceland. The population from Woods Hole, MA shows less genetic diversity than the New Brunswick population.

The more recent expansion of these haplotypes demonstrates the southward movement of hydroid populations, possibly due to climate change. The North Atlantic populations contain ancestral haplotypes, which differ from the populations in Japan and New Zealand. Pacific populations have more haplotype diversity than all four of the North Atlantic populations, which indicates that the North Atlantic population is more recently established than the Pacific population. The minimum estimated age of the New Brunswick population is between 47 and 143 thousand years old. Including the Massachusetts population, this number is between 82 and 150 thousand years, but Iceland has the oldest estimated population with the minimum age ranging from 68 to 204 thousand years old.

Obelia are distinguishable from others in Campanulariidae from their size in length and diameter, as well as their smaller hydrothecal cusps and relatively thinner perisarc thickness. Some morphological traits are hard to distinguish across species, so observing a combination of these traits will help with identification. Other useful observable characteristics are branching pattern of colonies and length of trophosome. There are variations and exceptions to these, which makes identification even more difficult. O. geniculata is characterized by a thicker perisarc with more variation that other species of Obelia. O. longissima have longer first and second order branches, in addition to a greater variation in hydrothecal cusp length than others in the genus. O. bidentata differs from the previous species due to their more cylindrical and longer hydrothecal cusps.
