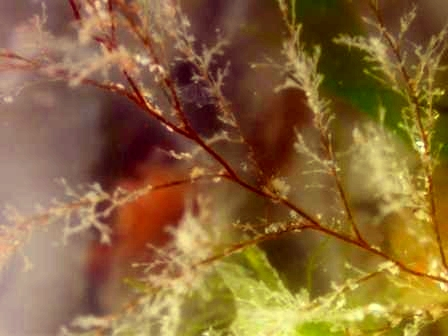
- Obelia longissima

Scientific classification
- Kingdom: Animalia
- Phylum: Cnidaria
- Class: Hydrozoa
- Order: Leptothecata
- Family: Campanulariidae
- Genus: Obelia
- Species: O. longissima

Binomial name
- Obelia longissima (Pallas, 1766)

Synonyms
- Campanularia flabellata Hincks, 1866; Laomedea flabellata (Hincks, 1866); Laomedea longissima (Pallas, 1766); Obelia flabellata (Hincks, 1866); Obelia plana Haeckel, 1879

= Obelia longissima =

Species of hydrozoan

Obelia longissima is a colonial species of hydrozoan in the order Leptomedusae. Its hydroid form grows as feathery stems resembling seaweed from a basal stolon. It is found in many temperate and cold seas world-wide but is absent from the tropics.

== Description ==
The sessile colonial stage of Obelia longissima is the most long-lived and the most easily observed of its life stages. The hydroid looks superficially like fronds of seaweed. It has a basal stolon growing in close proximity with the substrate. Out of this grow fragile, flexible stems up to 35 centimetres (14 in) high each with short side branches. As the stolon grows, new branches develop and the older ones are reabsorbed so the colony moves across the substrate. When the availability of food is high, further upright branches develop but when it is low, most growth takes place by way of stolon elongation and branching. The stems have dark-coloured, usually straight internodes between chitinous chambers called hydrothecae which are shaped like small wine-glasses. These protect the polyps.

== Distribution and habitat ==
Obelia longissima has a wide distribution. It occurs in the Atlantic Ocean as far north as the New Siberian Islands to the north of Siberia and as far south as the South Orkney Islands but is largely absent from the tropics. It is also found in the Mediterranean Sea, the Black Sea and the Baltic Sea. It is also present in the Indo-Pacific Ocean and is considered native from Alaska to southern California. It is one of the first species to colonise newly submerged surfaces and it can disperse widely because of the long-lasting larval stages and its ability to raft, attached to floating objects. It has wide tolerances of salinity and temperature but growth may not occur at above 27 °C (81 °F). It can sometimes be found in rock pools but mostly occurs in the shallow sublittoral zone and has been reported at depths as great as 500 metres (1,600 ft) off Patagonia. It grows on hard surfaces such as rocks, boulders, stones, shells, the stipes of kelp, floating objects and man-made structures and is part of the fouling community.

== Biology ==
The polyps of Obelia longissima resemble tiny sea anemones and have a ring of small tentacles which they spread in the current to intercept passing food items. The tentacles are armed with nematocysts, stinging cells with which they subdue their prey. The central mouth of each polyp connects to a digestive cavity which is continuous throughout the stem. The diet consists of zooplankton, worms, small crustaceans, insect larvae and detritus.

== Life cycle ==
Obelia longissima has a complex life cycle. New colonies can be formed asexually by breakage of the stolon. Both the broken ends heal rapidly and begin to grow. Vertical stolons may also develop and attach themselves to other surfaces before detaching themselves from the parent colony. Another form of asexual reproduction takes place, possibly in response to stress, when gemmules form as rounded stubby outgrowths from the branches. These become detached and float away and, being adhesive, stick to objects they may encounter and found a new colony. Experimentally, gemmule production has been triggered by a sudden change in temperature of 5 °C (9 °F), lack of aeration of the water or an over-abundance of food.

Each colony of Obelia longissima is either male or female. Under certain conditions reproductive structures called gonothecae form at junctions of older branches and gonophores develop inside these. Male or female medusae develop inside the gonophores, become detached and drift planktonically with the currents for one to four weeks. When the medusae are mature, gametes are released into the sea. Fertilisation is external and the sperm seems to be chemically attracted to the eggs. The resulting embryos develop into planula larvae which one to three weeks later settle on the seabed. The settlement sites may be selected because of a suitable surface film on the substrate. Metamorphosis of the larvae takes place and new colonies are formed.
