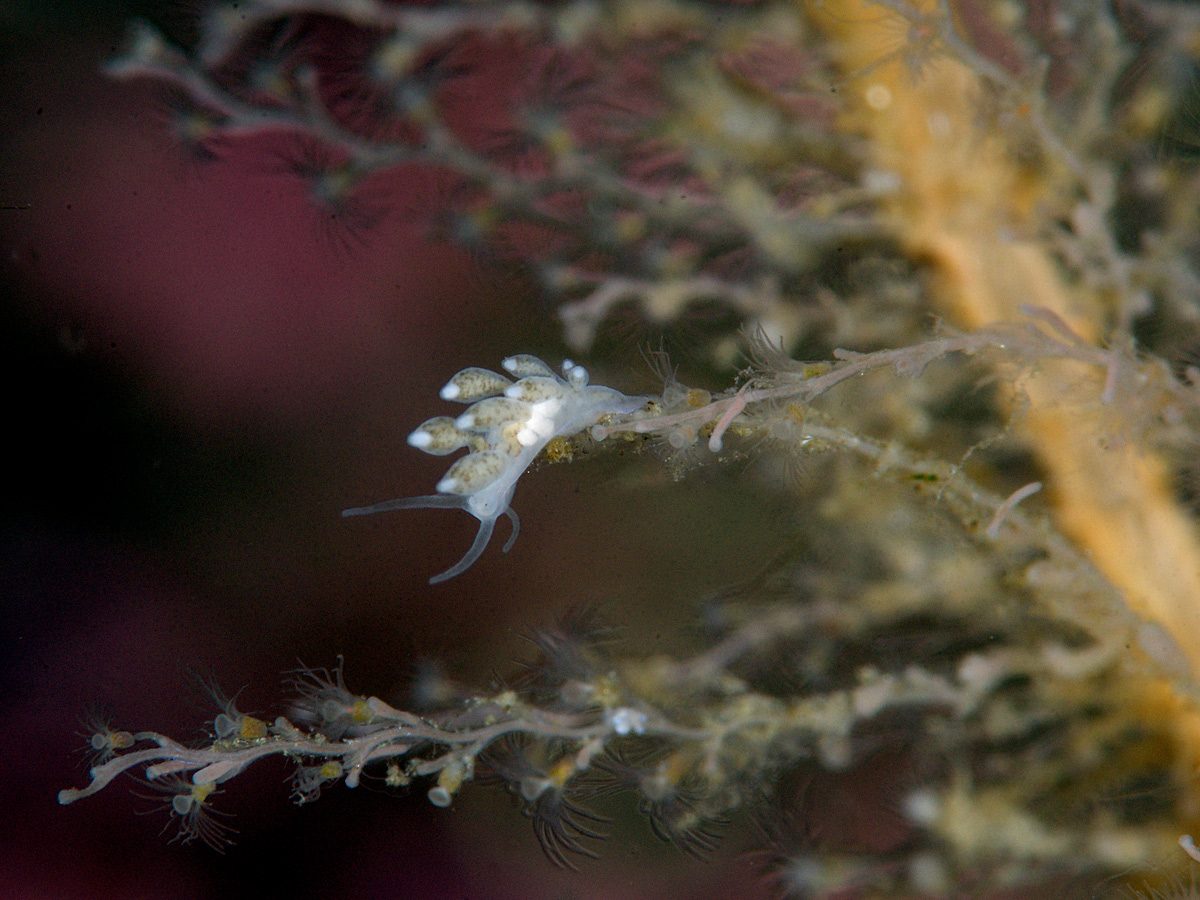
- The nudibranch Tergipes tergipes, Gulen Dive Centre, Norway.

Scientific classification
- Kingdom: Animalia
- Phylum: Mollusca
- Class: Gastropoda
- Order: Nudibranchia
- Suborder: Aeolidacea
- Superfamily: Fionoidea
- Family: Tergipedidae; Bergh, 1889

Genera
- See text

= Tergipedidae =

Family of gastropods

Tergipedidae is a family of sea slugs, aeolid nudibranchs, and marine gastropod molluscs in the superfamily Fionoidea (according to the Taxonomy of the Gastropoda by Bouchet & Rocroi, 2005).

== Taxonomic history ==
The bratos in this family were moved to the family Fionidae as a result of a molecular phylogenetics study. This was reversed and the family Tergipedidae was restricted to the one nominate genus in 2017 as a result of a re-evaluation of this study and further DNA results.

== Genera ==
Genera within the family Tergipedidae include:

- Tergipes Cuvier, 1805

Genera and subfamilies currently brought into synonymy

- Subfamily Tergipedinae: synonym of Tergipedidae Bergh, 1889
