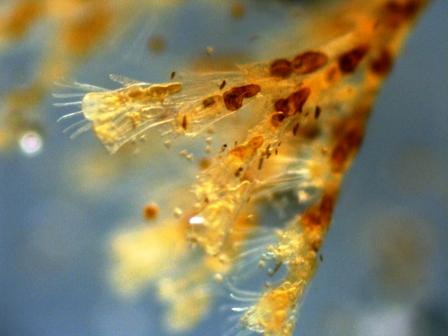
- Colony of Obelia sp.

Scientific classification
- Kingdom: Animalia
- Phylum: Cnidaria
- Class: Hydrozoa
- Order: Leptothecata
- Family: Campanulariidae; Johnston, 1836

Genera
- See text

= Campanulariidae =

Family of hydrozoans

Campanulariidae is a family of hydrozoans in the phylum Cnidaria, or stinging-celled animals. Campanulariidae is composed entirely of hydoids, a Greek term meaning "water animals" applied to the plant-like polyp colonies of the class Hydrozoa. All species of the Campanulariidae are aquatic in habitat, primarily inhabiting coastal regions and tidal pools.

Obelia contains probably the most well-known species of this phylum, and include four species. All are around 20–35 cm in height with a series of branches carrying the individual polyps. One species, Obelia longissima, is unique for its ability to produce obelin, a photoprotein which allows for bioluminescence.

The genus Laomedea includes such species as Laomedea angulata and Laomedea flexuosa, which are similar in appearance to the Obelia, though they are smaller and lack a medusa stage present in Obelia.

== Taxonomy and systematics ==
The following genera are recognized within the family Campanulariidae:

- Campanularia Lamarck, 1816
- Clytia Lamouroux, 1812
- Gastroblasta Keller, 1883
- Gonothyraea Allman, 1864
- Hartlaubella Poche, 1914
- Laomedea Lamouroux, 1812
- Obelia Péron & Lesueur, 1810
- Orthopyxis L. Agassiz, 1862
- Rhizocaulus Stechow, 1919
- Silicularia Meyen, 1834
- Tulpa Stechow, 1921
