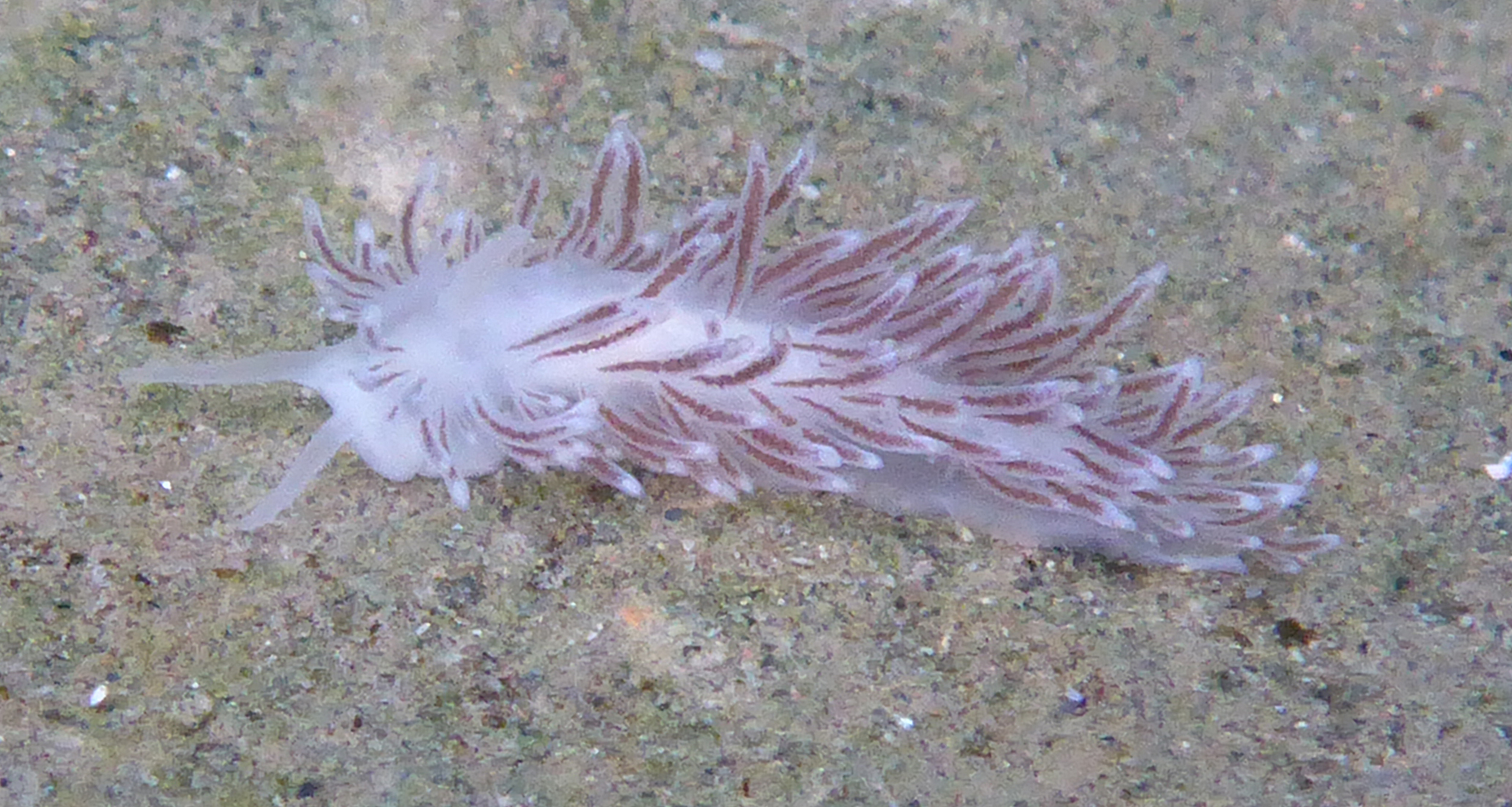

Scientific classification
- Kingdom: Animalia
- Phylum: Mollusca
- Class: Gastropoda
- Order: Nudibranchia
- Suborder: Aeolidacea
- Family: Cuthonidae
- Genus: Cuthona
- Species: C. divae

Binomial name
- Cuthona divae (Er. Marcus, 1961)

Synonyms
- Precuthona divae Er. Marcus, 1961 - basionym; Cratena rosea MacFarland, 1966

= Cuthona divae =

Species of gastropod

Cuthona divae, the rose-pink cuthona, is a species of sea slug, an aeolid nudibranch, a marine gastropod mollusc in the family Cuthonidae.

== Distribution ==
This species was described from Dillon Beach, California, United States. It has subsequently been reported from the Pacific Ocean coast of North America from Vancouver Island, British Columbia, Canada, to Point Loma, San Diego, California.

== Ecology ==
Cuthona divae is reported to feed on the hydroids Hydractinia and Clavactinia milleri, family Hydractiniidae.
