= Schuchertinia milleri =

Scientific classification
- Kingdom: Animalia
- Phylum: Cnidaria
- Class: Hydrozoa
- Order: Anthoathecata
- Family: Hydractiniidae
- Genus: Schuchertinia
- Species: S. milleri

Binomial name
- Schuchertinia milleri (Torrey, 1902)

Synonyms
- Hydractinia milleri Torrey, 1902

Species of hydrozoan

Schuchertinia milleri, commonly known as the Miller hydractinia, hedgehog hydroid or snail fur, is a small colonial hydroid in the family Hydractiniidae, found in the eastern Pacific Ocean. It forms mat-like colonies on rocks, or sometimes on the mollusc shells occupied by hermit crabs.

== Taxonomy ==
Harry Beal Torrey described the species in the much larger genus Hydractinia in 1902. That placement remained unchallenged for over a century until phylogenetic studies began to be carried on the Hydractiniidae, which revealed that Hydractinia required splitting. H. milleri was amongst the species transferred to the newly erected Schuchertinia in 2010.

== Description ==
Colonies of this hydroid consist of a carpet-like mat of stolons, interspersed with long spines, from which arise singly three different types of polyp; feeding polyps known as gastrozooids, reproductive polyps known as gonozooids and finger-shaped polyps known as dactylozooids. The stolons have a chitinous covering known as perisarc but the polyps are naked. The gastrozooids are pink, up to 5 mm (0.2 in) tall with a ring of 12 to 20 tentacles surrounding the mouth. The colony is either male or female, so all the gonozoids are the same sex. Female gonozoids contain a single egg.

== Distribution and habitat ==
This hydroid is native to the northeastern Pacific Ocean, its range extending from Vancouver Island to Monterey Bay, California. It occurs in the low intertidal zone and the shallow subtidal zone. It grows on and under rocks and boulders, and on the mollusc shells occupied by hermit crabs.

== Ecology ==
Species of hydroid are sometimes found growing on the mollusc shells occupied by hermit crabs. In one such case, a colony of Schuchertinia milleri was found on the shell occupied by the whiteknee hermit crab Pagurus dalli (which is more usually overgrown by a species of sponge). The association seems to be symbiotic, with the crab benefitting from the protection provided by the hydroid with its stinging cells, and with the hydroid benefitting avoiding being buried in the sediment, and by being transported to new feeding locations. The crab has been observed, when "wearing" other species of hydroid, to wipe the flagellum of its second antenna across the surface of the hydroid colony, in order to gather larger planktonic prey items from its epibiont.
