= Gernot Schiefer =

German psychoanalyst and scientist

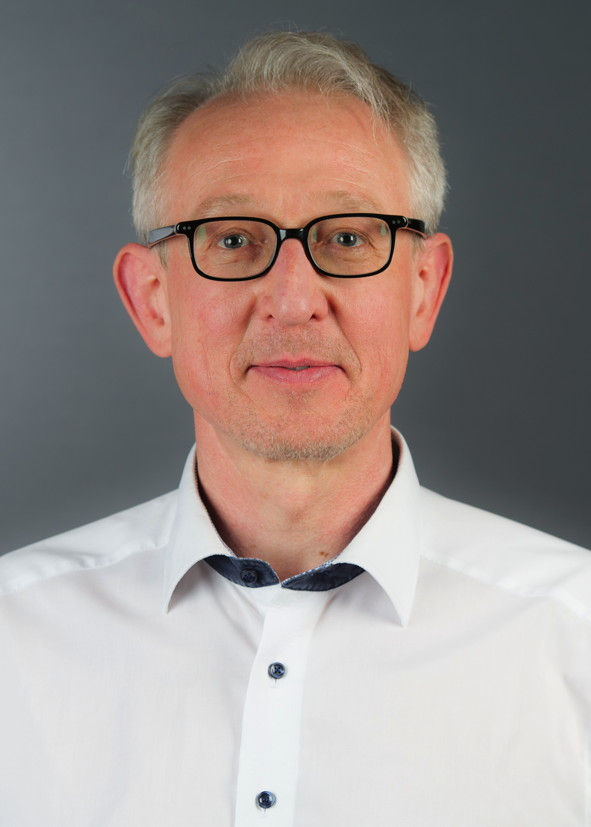
German psychoanalyst and scientist

Gernot Schiefer (born 1964 in Düsseldorf) is a German psychologist and psychoanalyst. He is a professor of business psychology and head of the Competence Center for Qualitative Research at the FOM University of Applied Sciences in Mannheim.

== Career ==
During his psychology studies at University of Cologne, he focused on psychological morphology as a student of Wilhelm Salber. After graduating in 1991, he was licensed as a psychological psychotherapist for adults in 1999. In 2003, as a student of Rainer Krause among others, he completed training as a psychoanalyst at the Saarland Institute for Psychoanalysis and Psychotherapy (SIPP) in Saarbrücken.

In 2006, Schiefer completed his doctorate at LMU Munich under the supervision of Lutz von Rosenstiel and graduated with a dissertation at the Technical University of Munich with the degree of Dr. oec.

Since 2012, Schiefer has been a professor of business psychology with a focus on human resources and management at the FOM Hochschule für Oekonomie & Management in Mannheim.

From 1995 to 2014, Schiefer was, together with a partner, managing director of an internationally active marketing consultancy and market research company, which mainly conducted market and advertising psychology research.

== Research interests ==
As head of the Competence Centre for Qualitative Research Gernot Schiefer pursues a hermeneutic, qualitative-methodological research approach. Among other things, he investigates post-heroic leadership concepts and integrates psychoanalytical perspectives and methods. Since 2020, Schiefer has been a member of the DBVC German Federal Coaching Association as a scientific expert for coaching and works there on the scientific foundation of coaching processes.

== Monographs ==
- Motive des Blutspendens. Eine tiefenpsychologische Untersuchung mit Gestaltungsoptionen für das Marketing von Nonprofit-Organisationen des Blutspendewesens, Gabler Verlag, Wiesbaden 2006, ISBN 978-3-8350-0572-3 (= Dissertation).
- with Ramona Gattner: Neuroleadership – die Grundannahmen in kritischer Analyse. Was Neurowissenschaften zur Zukunft von Führungstheorien wirklich beitragen, Springer, Wiesbaden 2019, ISBN 978-3-658-23477-5.
- with Corinna Hoffmann: Lernmotivation und Weiterbildungsbereitschaft älterer Mitarbeiter. Hilfestellung für Führungskräfte im Rahmen agiler Personalführung, Springer, Wiesbaden 2019, ISBN 978-3-658-26124-5.
- with Hanna Nitsche: Die Rolle der Führungskraft in agilen Organisationen. Wie Führungskräfte und Unternehmen jetzt umdenken sollten, Springer, Wiesbaden 2019, ISBN 978-3-658-27436-8.
- with Laura Gehrlein: Nostalgie als Stimmungsaufheller. Eine Einführung in die psychologischen Auswirkungen des nostalgischen Erinnerns, Springer, Wiesbaden 2021, ISBN 978-3-658-34100-8.
- with Corinna Hoffmann: Older Employees' Motivation to Learn an Readiness for Training. Assistance for Leaders in the Context of Agile Personnel Management, Springer Wiesbaden 2021, ISBN 978-3-658-35724-5.
