= Gonozooid =

Reproductive individuals of colonial organisms

A gonozooid is any of the reproductive individuals of tunicate, bryozoan, or hydrozoan colonies that produce gametes. Gonozooids may play a role in labour division or in alternation of generations. A gonozooid typically has hardly any other function than reproduction, amounting to little more than a motile gonad.

The production of gonozooids amounts to one aspect of certain classes of alternation of generations. In biological terms the various forms are examples of evolutionary strategies and are largely analogous rather than homologous; the gonozooid phases of tunicates and bryozoans, for instance, did not originate from a common ancestor.

== Examples of species with gonozooids ==
=== Hydractinia symbiolongicarpus ===
Polyps from the cnidarian Hydractinia symbiolongicarpus form colonies where labour is divided between reproduction (gonozooids), feeding (gastrozooids) and defense (dactylozooid). Even though they are genetically identical, there is a distinct morphological difference between those polyps. The gonozooids have gametes-producing organs called gonophores on their body column. They lack the mouth and tentacles present on gastrozooids, and the stinging cells present on the dactylozooid. They can only survive as part of the colony.

=== Doliolum nationalis ===
The tunicate Doliolum nationalis does not form colonies, but is a free swimming-organism. It exhibits alternation of generation in its life cycle. In this organism, the gonozooids are hermaphrodites. They both produce and fertilize ova, which in turn develop into oozooids, the asexual stage. This oozoid develops further and takes on a quite different form than the gonozooid. Through asexual reproduction called budding, new gonozooids are produced and the life cycle closes.

=== Celleporella hyalina ===
Another colonial gonozooid-forming animal is the bryozoan Celleporella hyalina. Male and female gonozooids are budded from a layer of sterile gastrozooids. The gonozooids then produce larvae, which will undergo metamorphosis and become the founder of another colony.

== Roles of gonozooid individuals in the life cycle ==
=== Division of labour ===
In animals such as Hydractinia symbiolongicarpus, gonozooids are part of a colony. Each individual has a role that benefits the colony as a whole. The gonozooids that produce the gametes can sexually reproduce. As the whole colony is genetically identical, it is not necessary for each polyp to individually reproduce, allowing more energy and resources to be used for other tasks such as feeding and defense.

=== Sexual/asexual reproduction frequencies ===
In certain animals, stressful environments have been known to lead to an increase in gonozooid frequencies. Higher gonozooid frequencies lead to more sexual reproduction and thus more offspring being genetically different from their parents. The resulting higher genetic variance increases the chances of beneficial phenotypes appearing in the population. This beneficial phenotype may in turn spread throughout the population and increase its resistance against the stressing factor.
