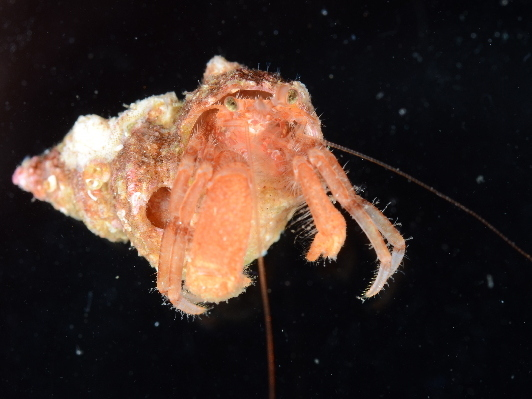

Scientific classification
- Domain: Eukaryota
- Kingdom: Animalia
- Phylum: Arthropoda
- Class: Malacostraca
- Order: Decapoda
- Suborder: Pleocyemata
- Infraorder: Anomura
- Family: Paguridae
- Genus: Pagurus
- Species: P. dalli

Binomial name
- Pagurus dalli (Benedict, 1892)

Synonyms
- Eupagurus dalli Benedict, 1892

= Pagurus dalli =

Species of crustacean

Pagurus dalli, commonly known as the whiteknee hermit or whiteknee hermit crab, is a species of hermit crab in the family Paguridae. It is found in the northeastern Pacific Ocean at depths down to about 276 m (900 ft). It usually lives in a mutualistic symbiosis with a sponge, or sometimes a hydroid.

== Description ==
Pagurus dalli has a smooth, partially calcified carapace up to 1.8 cm (0.7 in) long, and a curved abdomen. The legs are light tan with white stripes, and it is the broad white band on the merus segment of the chelae (claws) that gives this hermit crab its common name. The dorsal surface of the carapace has a network of white, red, light and dark brown markings and is rimmed with red, and the flagellae (terminal segments) of the second pair of antennae are reddish-brown and white.

== Distribution ==
This hermit crab is native to the northeastern Pacific Ocean, its range extending from the Bering Sea to Oregon, but is not particularly common anywhere. Its depth range is from the low intertidal zone to a depth of about 276 m (900 ft), and it is found on sandy or muddy substrates or on gravel.

== Ecology ==
Like other hermit crabs, P. dalli uses an empty gastropod mollusc shell to protect its soft parts, primarily its abdomen. It usually lives symbiotically with a sponge such as Suberites ficus or Suberites latus, which overgrows and eventually dissolves the shell. The sponge benefits from the crab's ability to move away from predators such as nudibranchs, while the crab may benefit from the sponge's unpalatability and the camouflage it provides. P. dalli has been found enveloped in a similar way by the colonial hydroid Schuchertinia milleri. After the hydroid has dissolved the shell its semi-calcareous matted structure acts as a substitute. Being encrusted by a hydroid colony seems to deter predation by octopuses.

Pagurus dalli is one of several species of hermit crabs in the infraorder Anomura that the parasitic barnacle Clistosaccus paguri uses as a host. A female cyprid larva of the parasite injects some cells into the crab's abdomen at any stage in the crab's moulting cycle. These develop internally sending out root-like growths into the host's tissues, and later developing an external, stalked protuberance housing the parasite's reproductive organs; its presence effectively castrates the host by causing the host's gonads to diminish in size.
