= Psammoactinia =

Scientific classification
- Domain: Eukaryota
- Kingdom: Animalia
- Phylum: Cnidaria
- Class: Hydrozoa
- Order: Anthoathecata
- Family: Hydractiniidae
- Genus: †Psammoactinia; Olivero & Aguirre-Urreta, 1994
- Species: †P. antarctica

Binomial name
- †Psammoactinia antarctica Psammoactinia antarctica

Extinct genus of hydrozoans

Psammoactinia antarctica was an encrusting, colonial cnidarian in the family Hydractiniidae that lived in the Cretaceous Antarctic. Within its family, P. antarctica had the unusual ability to agglutinate sand and silt grants, incorporating them into the basal layer and pillars making up the wall of the chambers of its laminae. It encrusted gastropod shells inhabited by hermit crabs of the genus Paguristes.

The Psammoactinia colony began with a larva landing on a small gastropod shell. The colony then grew past the aperture of the shell and formed a tube that conformed to the hermit crab’s shape and growing pattern.
