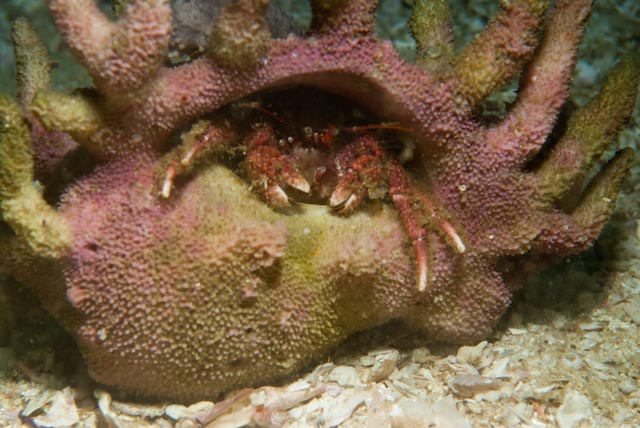
- shell-mimic hydroid on shell occupied by pink hermit crab

Scientific classification
- Kingdom: Animalia
- Phylum: Cnidaria
- Class: Hydrozoa
- Order: Anthoathecata
- Family: Hydractiniidae
- Genus: Hydrocorella
- Species: H. africana

Binomial name
- Hydrocorella africana Stechow, 1921

= Hydrocorella africana =

Species of cnidarian

Hydrocorella africana, the shell-mimic hydroid, is a small colonial encrusting hydroid in the family Hydractiniidae.

== Description ==
Shell-mimic hydroids grow as calcified colonies of 0.5–2 cm thick on shells of living snails. The colony has a pale chalky skeleton and cream to orange hydranths (feeding individuals).

== Distribution ==
This colonial animal is found only off the South African coast from the west coast to Durban subtidally and to 500m under water.

== Ecology ==
After the death of the mollusc the colony may continue growing in an open spiral. The colony often develops into spines and outgrowths, growing to such an extent that the colonised shell becomes unrecognisable.
