= Dieter Herbst =

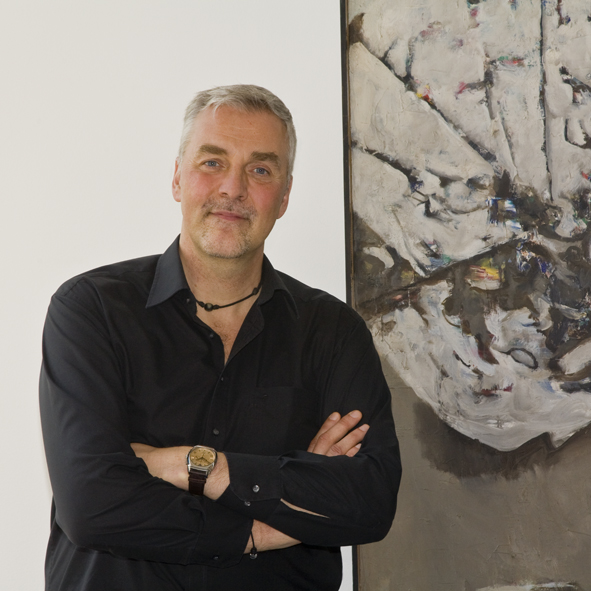
- Dr. Dieter Herbst (2014)
- Born: July 31, 1960 (age 65); Groß-Gerau/Germany
- Occupations: Author, Marketing expert

Dieter Herbst (born 31 July 1960 in Groß-Gerau, Hesse) is a German communications expert specializing in marketing management and public relations. He holds a doctorate in sociology and has lectured at universities including University of St. Gallen and FOM University of Applied Sciences.

Herbst served for 15 years as Head of Corporate Communications at Schering AG. He is the author of more than 20 books published nationally and internationally on topics related to marketing, branding, and corporate communications.
