= Hydractinia symbiolongicarpus =

- Two H. symbiolongicarpus colonies establishing contact and then separating.

Scientific classification
- Kingdom: Animalia
- Phylum: Cnidaria
- Class: Hydrozoa
- Order: Anthoathecata
- Family: Hydractiniidae
- Genus: Hydractinia
- Species: H. symbiolongicarpus

Binomial name
- Hydractinia symbiolongicarpus Buss and Yund, 1989

Species of hydrozoan

Hydractinia symbiolongicarpus is one of the 30 + Hydractinia species known worldwide. This saltwater animal, from here on referred to as Hydractinia, is at the base of the Cnidaria phylum and in many ways, is similar to the freshwater Hydra. In the wild, Hydractinia feed on smaller invertebrates found in the shallow mud, however in laboratory environments they are fed brine shrimp. Hydractinia symbiolongicurpus and its sibling species, Hydractinia echinata, are the two species from the genus Hydractinia on which most work has been published.

== Description ==
Hydractinia consist of a network of gastrovascular canals embedded in a plate of tissue called the mat. When gastrovascular canals extend outside of the mat, they are called stolons. The stolon tips on the outer edge of the colony secrete SIF (Stolon Inducing Factor) allowing for the creation of branching stolons In the field, colonies exhibit morphologies that range from highly stoloniferous to completely stolonless. Four types of polyps are found on Hydractinia colonies, including feeding polyps, sexual polyps, and two other types of polyps called dactylozooids and tentaculozooids, which protect the colony. Nematocyte precursors migrate into feeding polyps and germ cells migrate into sexual polyps. Nerve cells are found in all parts of the colony. While Hydractinia do not have a bodily axis of symmetry, the polyps exhibit oral/aboral symmetry. In the planula stage, the Hydractinia exhibit anterior/posterior symmetry.

== Growth and development ==
Hydractinia colonies are either male or female, and sexes are probably genetically determined. In the shallow waters, where Hydractinia are found, colonies release gametes on a light cue. After a period of darkness, sunlight triggers the rupture of gonadal walls in males and females, causing the release of gametes. Embryos develop in two to three days leading to a planula larvae. The planula then attaches to a hermit crab shell and subsequently undergoes metamorphosis to turn into a single polyp with extending stolons.

During metamorphosis, cell proliferation, differentiation, and migration occur. Metamorphosis is triggered by unknown cues from bacteria found on the hermit crab shell. After metamorphosis, the single polyp grows and extends its stolonal network and can reach adult size fairly quickly. The animal can complete its whole life cycle in 2–3 months.

== Allorecognition ==
Allorecognition is the ability to tell self from non-self within the same species. In Hydractinia, work on laboratory strains has revealed that this ability rests at two genetically inherited loci, called alr1 and alr2. If two colonies share an allele at both alr1 and alr2, they fuse and subsequently establish a continuous gastrovascular system. A complete mismatch at alr1 and alr2 leads to rejection, in which the colonies fight with each other until one colony dies. In rejection, the colonies inflict damage on each other by shooting nematocysts at each other where their stolons and mat contact. If two colonies match at one locus, they initially fuse and later separate their tissues, a response called transitory fusion. Fusion tests along with other molecular techniques are used to determine the unknown genotypes of Hydractinia colonies.

== Habitat ==
Hydractinia symbiolongicarpus lives in shallow environments along the North Atlantic coast and is primarily found on hermit crab shells.

== See also ==
- Hydractinia echinata
