= Cuthona distans =

Scientific classification
- Kingdom: Animalia
- Phylum: Mollusca
- Class: Gastropoda
- Order: Nudibranchia
- Suborder: Aeolidacea
- Family: Cuthonidae
- Genus: Cuthona
- Species: C. distans

Binomial name
- Cuthona distans (Odhner, 1922)

Species of gastropod

This taxon is inactive. It has been synonymized with Fiocuthona concinna.

Cuthona distans is a species of sea slug, an aeolid nudibranch, a marine gastropod mollusc in the family Fionidae.

== Distribution ==
This species was described from the Varangerfjord, near Vadsø in Finnmark, Norway. However, this nudibranch has not been seen since it was first described by Odhner in 1922.
