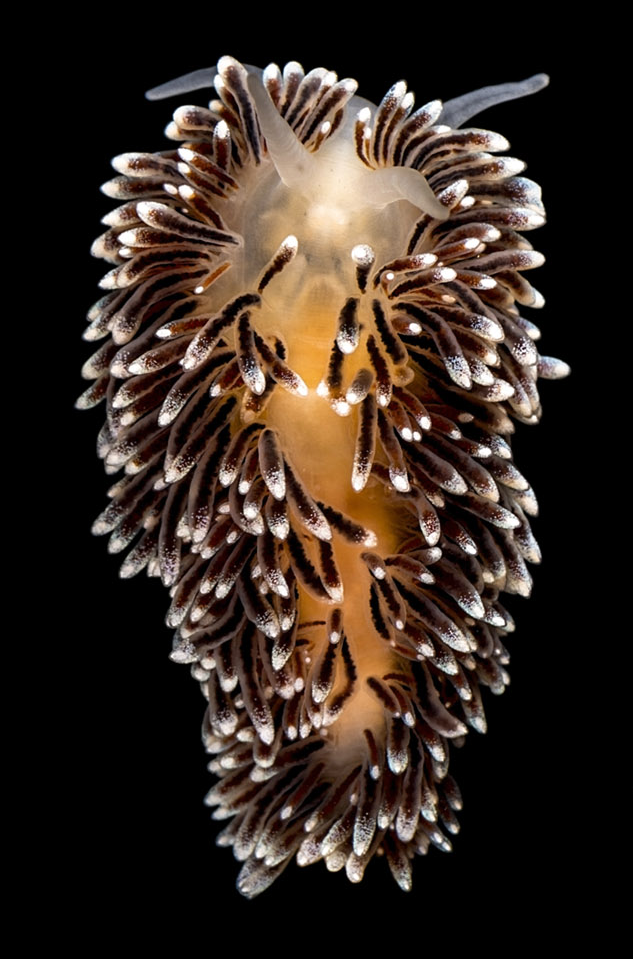
- One possible colour form ofCuthona nana

Scientific classification
- Kingdom: Animalia
- Phylum: Mollusca
- Class: Gastropoda
- Order: Nudibranchia
- Suborder: Aeolidacea
- Family: Cuthonidae
- Genus: Cuthona
- Species: C. nana

Binomial name
- Cuthona nana (Alder & Hancock, 1842)

Synonyms
- Cratena hirsuta Bergh, 1864; Cratena rubra Volodchenko, 1941; Eolis nana Forbes, 1840; Eolis peachii Alder & Hancock, 1848

= Cuthona nana =

Species of gastropod

Cuthona nana is a species of sea slug, an aeolid nudibranch, a marine gastropod mollusc in the family Cuthonidae.

== Taxonomic history ==
This species was named in 1842. In 1848 the same authors described Eolis peachii from Fowey harbour, Cornwall. The two species were considered to be the same by Brown, 1980.

== Distribution ==
Cuthona nana was described from specimens found under stones near low water mark at Cullercoats and Whitley Bay on the North Sea coast of England. It is reported from the NE Atlantic from Greenland and Spitsbergen south to Brittany, France.

== Ecology ==
Feeds on the hydroid Hydractinia echinata.
