= Schuchertinia =

Scientific classification
- Domain: Eukaryota
- Kingdom: Animalia
- Phylum: Cnidaria
- Class: Hydrozoa
- Order: Anthoathecata
- Family: Hydractiniidae
- Genus: Schuchertinia; Miglietta, McNally & Cunningham, 2010

Species
- See text

Genus of hydrozoans

Schuchertinia is a genus of commensal athecate hydroids in the family Hydractiniidae.

== Species ==
The World Register of Marine Species includes the following species in the genus:

- Schuchertinia allmanii (Bonnevie, 1898)
- Schuchertinia antonii (Miglietta, 2006)
- Schuchertinia conchicola (Yamada, 1947)
- Schuchertinia epiconcha (Stechow, 1908)
- Schuchertinia milleri (Torrey, 1902)
- Schuchertinia reticulata (Hirohito, 1988)
- Schuchertinia uchidai (Yamada, 1947)
