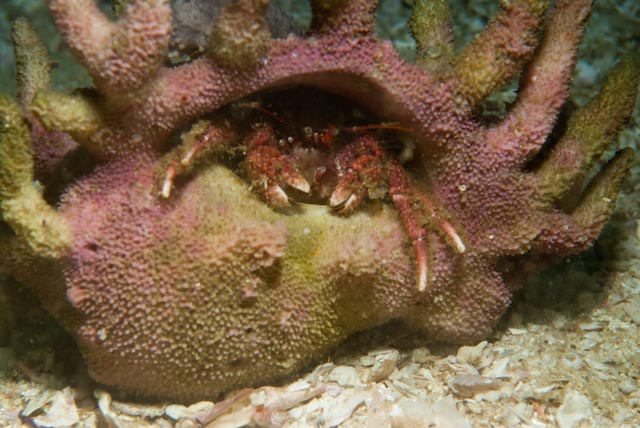
- pink hermit crab in a shell encrusted with the shell-mimic hydroid

Scientific classification
- Domain: Eukaryota
- Kingdom: Animalia
- Phylum: Arthropoda
- Class: Malacostraca
- Order: Decapoda
- Suborder: Pleocyemata
- Infraorder: Anomura
- Family: Diogenidae
- Genus: Paguristes
- Species: P. gamianus

Binomial name
- Paguristes gamianus (H. Milne-Edwards, 1836)

= Pink hermit crab =

Species of crustacean

The pink hermit crab (Paguristes gamianus) is a species of hermit crab in the family Diogenidae.

== Description ==
The pink hermit crab is a small hairy-legged pink hermit that grows to 2 cm. It has black eyes and equal-sized pincers with brown tips. It has white tips to its second and third legs.

== Distribution ==
This crab is found only around the southern African coast from southern Namibia to Cape Agulhas in less than 12m of water.

== Ecology ==
The female of this species broods 12-15 eggs within the shell.
