= Celleporella =

Scientific classification
- Kingdom: Animalia
- Phylum: Bryozoa
- Class: Gymnolaemata
- Order: Cheilostomatida
- Family: Hippothoidae
- Genus: Celleporella; Gray, 1848

Genus of bryozoans

Celleporella is a genus of bryozoans belonging to the family Hippothoidae.

The genus has cosmopolitan distribution.

Species:

- Celleporella alia Hayward, 1993
- Celleporella angusta Álvarez, 1991
- Celleporella annularis (Pallas, 1766)
- Celleporella carolinensis Ryland, 1979
- Celleporella catenifera Norman, 1894
- Celleporella chilina (d'Orbigny, 1842)
- Celleporella concava (Viviani, 1977)
- Celleporella cornuta (Busk, 1854)
- Celleporella felderi Voigt & Hillmer, 1983
- Celleporella hyalina (Linnaeus, 1767)
- Celleporella marionensis Branch & Hayward, 2005
- Celleporella nodasakae Dick, Grischenko & Mawatari, 2005
- Celleporella osiani Hughes & Wright, 2014
- Celleporella reflexa Dick & Ross, 1988
- Celleporella retiformis Moyano, 1987
- Celleporella tehuelcha Lopez Gappa, 1985
- Celleporella tuberculata (Hincks, 1880)
- Celleporella uberrima Moyano, 1987
