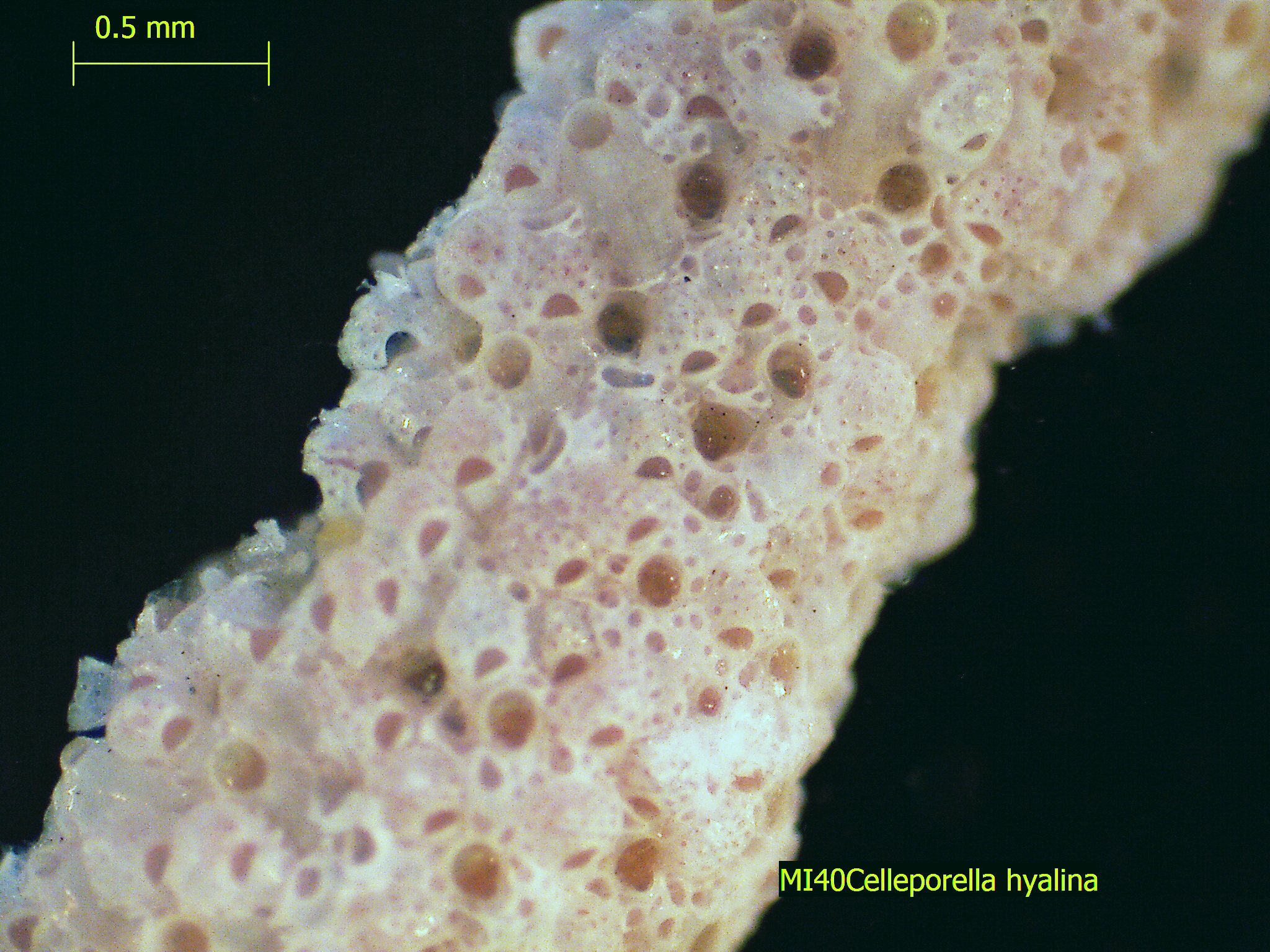

Scientific classification
- Kingdom: Animalia
- Phylum: Bryozoa
- Class: Gymnolaemata
- Order: Cheilostomatida
- Family: Hippothoidae
- Genus: Celleporella
- Species: C. hyalina

Binomial name
- Celleporella hyalina (Linnaeus, 1767)

= Celleporella hyalina =

Species of bryozoan

Celleporella hyalina is a species of bryozoans belonging to the family Hippothoidae.

It has almost cosmopolitan distribution.

The species has numerous subspecies, eg:

- Celleporella hyalina subsp. hyalina
- Celleporella hyalina subsp. marcusi (Morris, 1980)
