= Antarctothoa =

Scientific classification
- Kingdom: Animalia
- Phylum: Bryozoa
- Class: Gymnolaemata
- Order: Cheilostomatida
- Family: Hippothoidae
- Genus: Antarctothoa; Moyano, 1987

Genus of bryozoans

Antarctothoa is a genus of bryozoans belonging to the family Hippothoidae.

The species of this genus are found in southern parts of Southern Hemisphere.

Species:

- Antarctothoa annae Wright, Hayward & Hughes, 2007
- Antarctothoa antarctica Moyano & Gordon, 1980
- Antarctothoa aporosa (Levinsen, 1909)
- Antarctothoa ballia Gordon, 2020
- Antarctothoa bathamae (Ryland & Gordon, 1977)
- Antarctothoa bougainvillei (d'Orbigny, 1842)
- Antarctothoa buskiana (Hutton, 1873)
- Antarctothoa cancer (Hutton, 1873)
- Antarctothoa cancinoi Wright, Hayward & Hughes, 2007
- Antarctothoa delta (Ryland & Gordon, 1977)
- Antarctothoa dictyota (Hayward, 1993)
- Antarctothoa discreta (Busk, 1854)
- Antarctothoa galaica (Cesar-Aldariz, Fernández-Pulpeiro & Reverter-Gil, 1999)
- Antarctothoa haywardi Kuklinski & Barnes, 2009
- Antarctothoa mauricei Wright, Hayward & Hughes, 2007
- Antarctothoa muricata (Busk, 1879)
- Antarctothoa pansa Gordon, 2020
- Antarctothoa pellucida (MacGillivray, 1879)
- Antarctothoa polystachya Wright, Hayward & Hughes, 2007
- Antarctothoa tongima (Ryland & Gordon, 1977)
