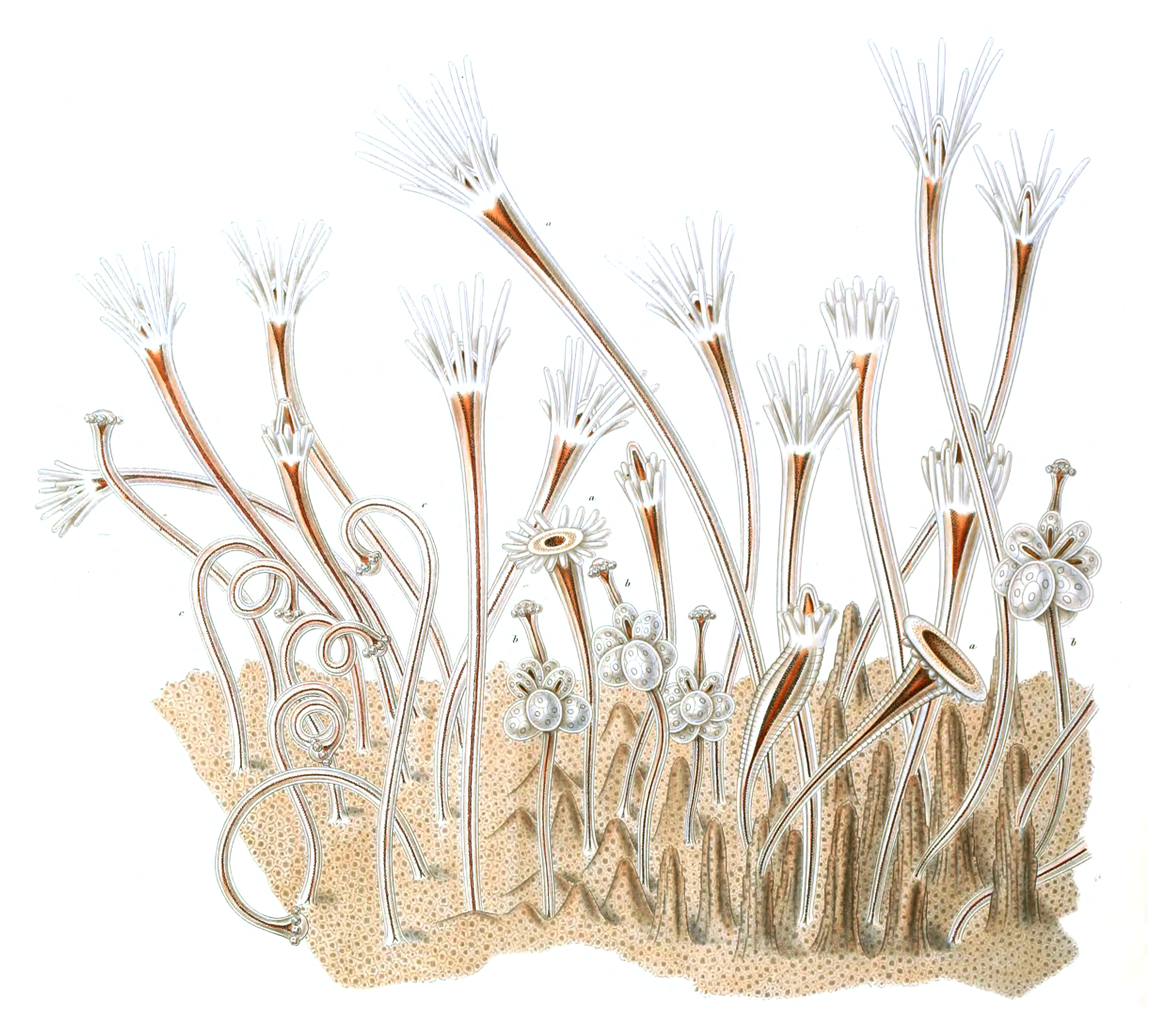

Scientific classification
- Kingdom: Animalia
- Phylum: Cnidaria
- Class: Hydrozoa
- Order: Anthoathecata
- Family: Hydractiniidae
- Genus: Hydractinia
- Species: H. echinata

Binomial name
- Hydractinia echinata Fleming, 1823

= Hydractinia echinata =

Snail fur

Species of hydrozoan

Hydractinia echinata is a colonial marine hydroid which is often found growing on dead, hermit-crabbed shells of marine gastropod species. This hydroid species is also commonly known as snail fur, a name which refers to the furry appearance that the hydroids give to a shell.

In the northwestern Atlantic, these hydroids are especially common on the outside of shells that are occupied by the flat-clawed hermit crab.

== Description ==
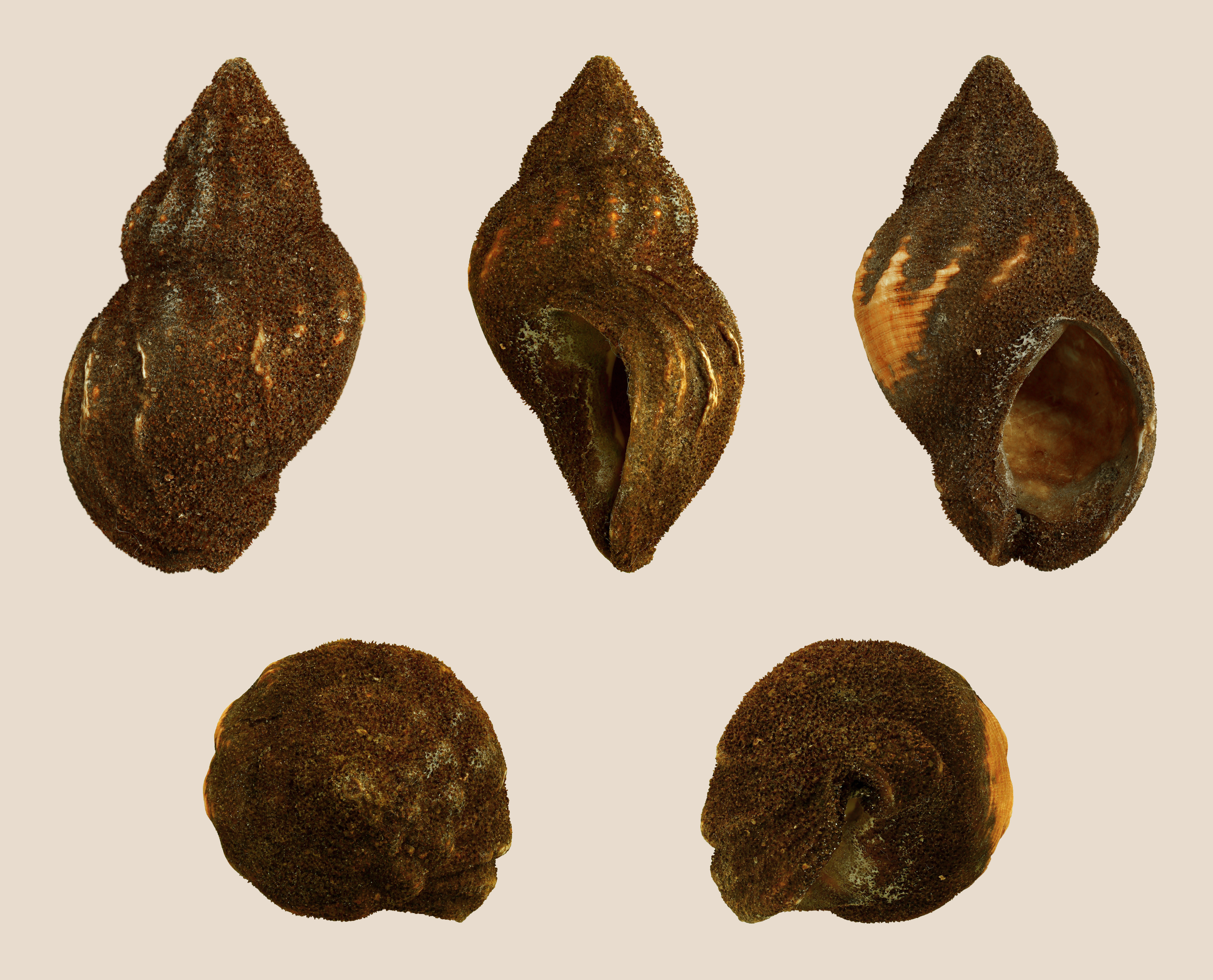
Hydractinia echinata on a shell of a common whelk (Buccinum undatum)

Hydractinia echinata forms pinkish-brown (when alive) or plain brown (when dead) patches on gastropod shells that are occupied by a hermit crab, often near the aperture of the shell.

The horny mat or hydrorhiza is about three millimetres thick. It consists of thick jagged spines that reach three millimetres in height. Amongst these there are three types of polyps. The club-like feeding polyps grow up to thirteen millimetres in length, and have two rows of eight tentacles, the lower set being shorter than the upper ones. There are also male and female reproductive polyps (gonozoids) that have a few short terminal tentacles. Scattered among these are specialized defensive stinging polyps (dactylozooids) that are long, coiled threads. The gonozoids liberate crawling planula larvae that search out moving gastropod shells.

== Distribution ==
H. echinata is found on all sides of the northern Atlantic Ocean, including the Arctic Ocean, the Saint-Lawrence Gulf, the Baltic Sea and the North Sea south to northwest Africa, as well as the Western Atlantic including the Gulf of Mexico. It is common around the coasts of Britain and Ireland, and there it is found where hermit crabs (Eupagurus bernhardus) occur, on the lower shore on sandy substrates.
