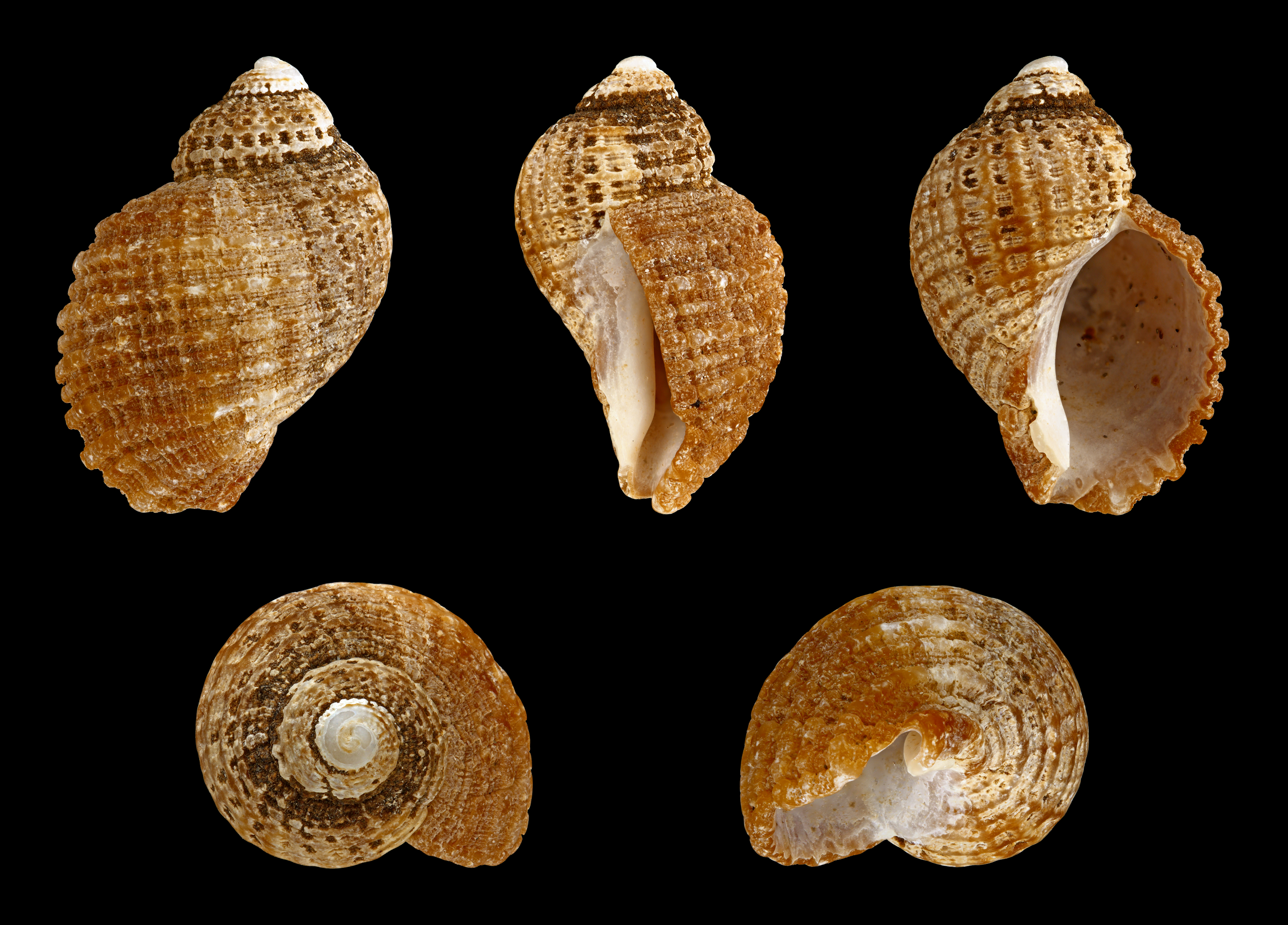
- Five views of a shell of Nucella squamosa (Lamarck, 1816)

Scientific classification
- Kingdom: Animalia
- Phylum: Mollusca
- Class: Gastropoda
- Subclass: Caenogastropoda
- Order: Neogastropoda
- Family: Muricidae
- Genus: Nucella
- Species: N. squamosa

Binomial name
- Nucella squamosa (Lamarck, 1816)

Synonyms
- Purpura clathrata Blainville, 1832; Purpura clathrata Kuster, 1859; Purpura ovalis Blainville, 1832; Purpura squamosa Lamarck, 1816; Purpura squamulosa Gray, 1839; Thais sculpturata Turton, 1932; Thais subglobosa Turton, 1932

= Nucella squamosa =

Species of gastropod

Nucella squamosa, common name the scaly dogwhelk, is a species of sea snail, a marine gastropod mollusk in the family Muricidae, the murex snails or rock snails.

== Description ==
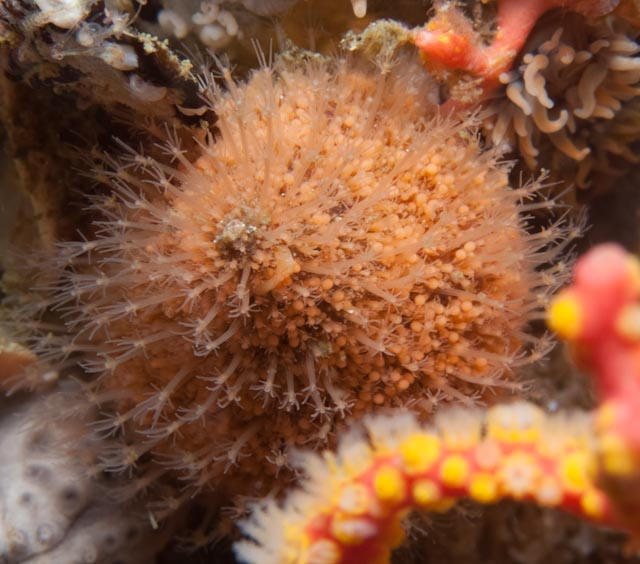
hydroid overgrowth on the shell

The scaly dogwhelk is a small brown whelk with many fine knobbly spiral ridges on its shell. It grows up to 5 cm in total length. The ridges of the snail's shell are not often visible because the whelk is usually overgrown by the high-spined commensal hydroid, Hydtractinia altispina, which looks prickly and is orange.

== Distribution ==
This marine snail is found off the southern African coast from central Namibia to Port St Johns, subtidally to 50m under water.

== Ecology ==
The eggs are laid in small groups of capsules which resemble stalked clubs. The commensal hydroid deters several of the snail's predators.
