= Janaria =

Scientific classification
- Kingdom: Animalia
- Phylum: Cnidaria
- Class: Hydrozoa
- Order: Anthoathecata
- Suborder: Filifera
- Family: Hydractiniidae
- Genus: Janaria; Stechow, 1921
- Species: J. mirabilis

Binomial name
- Janaria mirabilis Stechow, 1921

Genus of cnidarians

Janaria is a genus of commensal athecate hydroids in the family Hydractiniidae. It is a monotypic genus and the only species is Janaria mirabilis, commonly known as staghorn hydrocoral. It is a colonial species and lives on a shell occupied by a hermit crab. It is native to the tropical and semitropical eastern Pacific Ocean.

== Description ==
Janaria mirabilis is similar in appearance to a colonial coral, but comes from a quite separate group of cnidarians. The adult hydrocoral can be up to 5 cm (2 in) high and a similar width. It consists of a single horizontal branch and three or four vertical branches. The branches are straight or slightly curved and have blunt tips which are half as wide as the branches, the colour usually being cream or pale tan. The branches are calcified and each bears numerous polyps, the animal having been described as resembling a "fuzzy glove of feeding polyps".

== Distribution ==
This hydrocoral is native to the tropical and semitropical eastern Pacific Ocean, its range extending from Baja California Sur to Panama, including the Gulf of California. It occurs at depths between 7 and 137 m (20 and 450 ft).

== Ecology ==
A juvenile Janaria mirabilis will settle on a mollusc shell occupied by a hermit crab in the genus Manucomplanus. Here it buds and grows into a colony, sending out side-branches, and at the same time exuding chemicals which erode the mollusc shell. Eventually the mollusc shell is dissolved away and the hydrocoral takes up residence on the exposed carapace and abdomen of the crab. The association is mutually beneficial as the crab receives protection from predators that are deterred by the hydrocoral's stinging cells, while the hydrocoral benefits from being moved to new feeding areas by the mobile crab. A single hermit crab can carry a mobile home weighing nearly thirty times its own weight.

The tissues of the hydrocoral contain symbiotic zooxanthellae harboured within which provide additional nutrients for the colony. The hydrocoral often has epizoic invertebrates such as barnacles living on its surface.
