= Allorecognition =

Ability to distinguish tissues from another

Movie generated from tracings of gastrovascular canals (red) in two colonies of Hydractinia symbiolongicarpus that come into contact and then separate. The green structures are polyps.

Allorecognition is the ability of an individual organism to distinguish its own tissues from those of another. It manifests itself in the recognition of antigens expressed on the surface of cells of non-self origin. Allorecognition has been described in nearly all multicellular phyla.

This article focuses on allorecognition from the standpoint of its significance in the evolution of multicellular organisms. For other articles which focus on its importance in medicine, molecular biology, and so forth, the following topics are recommended as well as those in the Categories links at the bottom of this page.

- Immune system, Immunology
- Transplant rejection
- Tissue typing
- Major histocompatibility complex (MHC)

The ability to discriminate between self and non-self is a fundamental requirement for life. At the most basic level, even single-celled organisms need to be able to distinguish between food and non-food, to respond appropriately to invading pathogens, and to avoid cannibalism. In sexually reproducing organisms, self/non-self discrimination is essential to ensuring species-specific egg/sperm interaction during fertilization. Hermaphroditic organisms, such as annelids and certain plants, require recognition mechanisms to prevent self-fertilization. Such functions are all carried out by the innate immune system, which employs evolutionarily conserved pattern recognition receptors to eliminate cells displaying "nonself markers."

== Evolution of multicellularity ==
The evolution of multicellularity brought about various challenges, many of which could be met by increasingly sophisticated innate immune systems, but which also served as an evolutionary driving force for the development of adaptive immune systems. The adaptive or "specific" immune system in its fully qualified form (i.e. based on major histocompatibility complex (MHC), T-cell receptors (TCR), and antibodies) exists only in jawed vertebrates, but an independently evolved adaptive immune system has been identified in hagfish and lampreys (non-jawed vertebrates).

Multicellularity has arisen independently dozens of times in the history of life, in plants, animals, fungi, and prokaryotes, appearing first several billion years ago in cyanobacteria. Two categories of advantages have been attributed to the early development of multicellular existence: advantages related to size, and advantages related to functional specialization and division of labor. Size advantages may include greater feeding efficiency or increased robustness. For example, myxobacteria, moving in swarms, are able to maintain a high concentration of extracellular enzymes used to digest food, from which all the bacteria in the swarm benefit. Under various conditions, many microorganisms form biofilms which provide them with a protected environment. In organisms that have evolved functional specialization, an important division of labor may exist over reproduction: only a small fraction of cells contribute to the next generation. Somatic growth represents a form of altruism, where somatic cells give up reproduction helping germline cells reproduce.

== Free rider problem ==
The extracellular enzymes secreted by swarming bacteria, the slime of a biofilm, or the soma cells in a differentiated organism represent public goods which are vulnerable to exploitation by cheaters. This issue is well known in economics and evolutionary biology as the "free rider problem" or the "tragedy of the commons." A free rider (or freeloader) is an individual that consumes a resource without paying for it, or pays less than the full cost. In multicellular organisms, cheaters may arise from mutations in somatic cells that no longer contribute to the common good, or ignore controls on their reproduction. Another possibility may arise from somatic fusion: there are multicellular life-styles where there are few if any physical barriers to the intermingling of cells (for example: sponges, fungal mycelia) and even among organisms that have evolved physical integuments representing a first line of defense against invasion, opportunities for cellular exchange occur. Witness, for example, the spread of devil facial tumour disease among Tasmanian devils and transmissible venereal tumor in dogs.

In metazoans, defense against disruption of the multicellular life style by such cheaters takes two major forms. First, a consistent feature of the multicellular life cycle is the interposition of a unicellular phase, even among organisms whose major mode of propagation may be via many-celled vegetative propagules. This unicellular phase usually takes the form of a sexually produced zygote. Passage through a unicellular bottleneck assures that each representative of the next generation of organisms represents a distinct clone. Some offspring will carry a large number of deleterious mutations and will die off, while other offspring will carry few. In this manner, the organism bypasses "Muller's ratchet," the process by which the genomes of an asexual population accumulate deleterious mutations in an irreversible manner. The second defense against cheaters is the development of allorecognition mechanisms that guard against invasion by parasitic replicators. Allorecognition acts as an agent of kin selection by restricting fusion and community acceptance to related individuals. If related individuals fuse, the benefits of fusion will still apply, while the costs of competition for shared resources or reproductive opportunities will be reduced by a fraction proportional to the degree of relatedness between the fusing partners. If unrelated individuals fuse, or if a mutated cell arises within an organism that is distinguishable from self by the allorecognition system, a rejection response will be activated. As a general rule, rejection is mediated by the gene products of highly variable loci, which must match (or nearly match) between organisms for fusion to be successful.

== Allorecognition phenomena ==
Allorecognition phenomena have been recognized in bacterial self-identity and social recognition systems, kin discrimination in social amoebae, fungal mating types, fungal vegetative incompatibility, plant self-incompatibility systems, colonial marine invertebrates (such as corals, sponges, hydroids, bryozoans, and ascidians), and of course, vertebrates. The manner in which allorecognition manifests itself in these different systems varies greatly. Bacteria, for instance, secrete bacteriocins, proteinaceous toxins specifically targeted against members of their own species. Colonies of marine invertebrates, each representing a single genotype, expand across the ocean floor by asexual reproduction. Where colonies meet, they may, if compatible, fuse to form a single unit, or if incompatible, they may aggressively attempt to overgrow, poison, sting, or consume each other.

== Innate and adaptive immune systems ==
Vertebrate immunity is dependent on both adaptive and innate immune systems. In vertebrates, the innate immune system is composed of cells such as neutrophils and macrophages (which also have a role in the adaptive immune system as antigen presenting cells), as well as molecular pathways such as the complement system which react to microbial non-self. The innate immune system enables a rapid inflammatory response that contains the infection, and it activates the adaptive immune system, which eliminates the pathogen and, through immunological memory, provides long term protection against reinfection.

Comprehensive sequence searches across multiple taxonomic groups have failed to identify MHC and TCRs outside of the jawed vertebrates. Allorecognition in these animals rely on molecular mechanisms distinct from those of the jawed vertebrates. In sponges, various receptors (sponge adhesion molecules, receptor tyrosine kinase) with domains similar to those found in immunoglobulins have been identified. Sequence variability in "hot spots" have been identified in these receptors. It would appear that molecules which, later in evolution, were exploited in the adaptive immune response, had an earlier role in innate recognition. Lampreys and hagfish appear to have evolved, by convergent evolution, an adaptive immune response that is independent and distinct from the adaptive immune systems of higher vertebrates. Lymphocyte-like cells in these fish express highly variable lymphocyte receptor genes, which undergo somatic rearrangements reminiscent of the manner in which mammalian immunoglobulin genes are rearranged during development.

== Summary ==
In summary, allorecognition, the ability to distinguish self from non-self, is basic to all life, unicellular as well as multicellular. The earliest recognition systems were innate, and were based on the recognition of self molecules. The evolution of multicellular forms brought about selective pressures for ever-increasing sophistication to innate immune systems. Adaptive immune systems, based on the recognition of non-self, have arisen independently in two lines of chordates, and exploit molecules and cellular systems which had a previous role in innate immune responses. Allorecognition as it currently exists in mammals can be traced back as the result of sequential modification to immunity mechanisms dating back to some of the earliest multicellular organisms.

== See also ==
- Immune system, Immunology
- Transplant rejection
- Tissue typing
- Major histocompatibility complex (MHC)
