= Rainer Krause =

German researcher

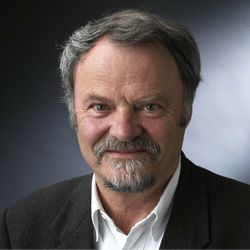
- Rainer Krause (2014)
- Born: October 5, 1942; Gemmrigheim, Germany
- Education: University of Tübingen, University of Zurich
- Occupations: Psychologist, psychoanalyst, emotion researcher
- Employer(s): Saarland University, International Psychoanalytic University Berlin
- Known for: Research on facial expressions and emotions, co-developer of Facial Action Coding System (FACS), founding member of Saarland Institute for Psychoanalysis and Psychotherapy
- Awards: Order of Merit of the Federal Republic of Germany (2010), Advancement Award of Deutsche Psychoanalytische Gesellschaft (1991)

Rainer Krause (born October 5, 1942) is a German psychologist, psychoanalyst and researcher of human emotions.

== Background ==
Krause was born in Gemmrigheim, Germany. He has five siblings; both parents were physicians. He is married and has one son. Krause lives and works in the Saarland area of Germany. Although he is retired as a professor of the Saarland University, he continues to participate in the public discourse.

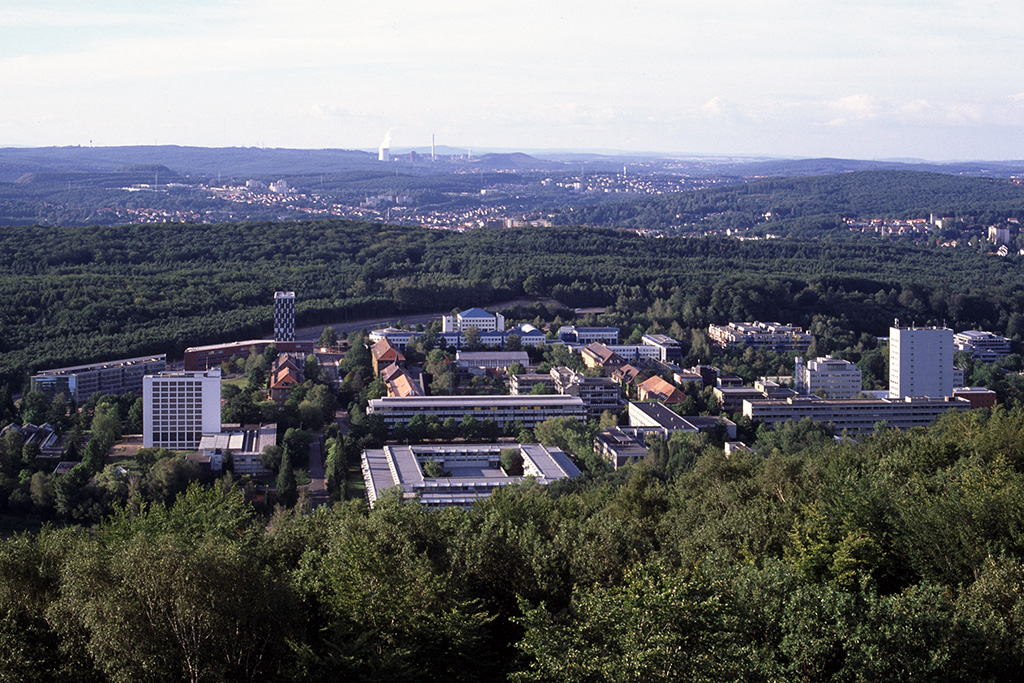
Campus of Saarland University

In 1962 Rainer Krause graduated from high school in Bietigheim. At the end of his military service, in 1964, he began to study psychology at the University of Tübingen. In 1967–68 he continued his studies at the University of Zurich and in 1969, after returning to Tübingen, he graduated, majoring in psychology. From the beginning he was particularly interested in clinical and social psychology. He took his first position as an assistant at the University of Zurich and in 1971 he began his psychoanalytic training at the Psychoanalytic Seminar Zurich. One year later he received his doctorate in Tübingen. In 1976 he habilitated in Zurich, where he received his teaching license with the so-called venia legendi in 1978. In 1980 he was appointed to the professorial chair of clinical psychology at the Saarland University. From 1981 to 1983 he was managing professor of the psychology department. In 2009 Krause retired, becoming emeritus.

== Work ==
In 1985, as part of funding by the Deutsche Forschungsgemeinschaft, Krause organized the second European Conference on the Exploration of Facial Expressions. This marked the beginning of his extensive research and public recognition in the areas of affect and emotion and the question of how they find their manifestation in the facial expressions of people. In 1986 he was elected to the board of directors of the International Society for Research on Emotions. Various stays abroad were part of his early and later career, as well as his ongoing teaching and research.

Krause concentrated his diverse scientific activities on research of emotions and established himself in various professional societies in psychoanalysis. In 1991 he organized the annual congress of the International Society for Research on Emotions. He completed a total of five projects funded by the German Research Foundation that focused on exchanges of emotions between healthy and mentally ill groups. Together with others he founded the Erasmus Programme for emotion research at the universities of Amsterdam, Bologna, Geneva, Paris, Madrid, Manchester and Würzburg. Since 1998 he has been supporting colleagues trained in Germany who are trying to establish a psychotherapeutic supply network in İzmir. In 2002 he established a psychotherapeutic ambulance system at the Saarland University where patients are still treated. Since 2010 he has been a professor at the International Psychoanalytic University Berlin. There he is particularly involved in creating the infrastructure for research. As co-founder of the Saarland Institute for Psychoanalysis and Psychotherapy, established in 1991, he continues to work there as lecturer, training analyst and supervisor.

Until 2005 Krause was co-editor of the Journal of Psychosomatic Medicine and Psychotherapy, the organ of the German Society for Psychosomatic Medicine and Medical Psychotherapy (DGPM). He was also co-developer of the Facial Action Coding System (FACS), a scientifically based technology of emotion recognition, which helps to make it possible to decode facial expressions.

His numerous international contacts were also helpful for his research on emotions in "intercultural comparison of emotion encoding and decoding using the example of French and German persons", his own research that he dedicated to this project in 1986–87. In addition to teaching and research, Krause participated in the psychotherapeutic care of patients with various mental disorders. Although being critical of psychoanalysis, it is the theoretical basis of his research and treatment methods due to his belief that the "essence of the theory is indispensable".

== Emotions and communication ==
As part of a controversy among researchers of emotion, with respect to the types and numbers of affects that can be distinguished, Krause committed himself to "seven primary affects": joy, curiosity, fear, anger, sadness, contempt and disgust. Primary affects are characterized by a "phylogenetically formed meaning". He distinguishes them from "structural affects", such as shame or pride, which "require additional ontogenetic acquired knowledge". Considering the effectiveness of all these emotions Krause describes the typical design of interpersonal relationships in different contexts. "Emotions are contagious" is one of the formulas on which Krause bases his investigations. He studies in detail which muscles are innervated in which affect, that in turn determines the facial expressions of the examinee. Accurate knowledge of the involved facial muscles – Krause calls it the "pattern of innervation" – allows the identification of the emotion that is brought into a communicative situation, such as in a conversation, a lecture or a discussion. This expression is not always conscious or desired or intended by the person. Through the discrepancy between verbal communication and facial expression of emotions in communication, conflicts and misunderstandings can arise.

Using the example of smiling, Krause shows in a (German) presentation the difference between a natural-looking and a phony smile, in which different muscles are involved. Significant in this regard is the fact that the muscles of the so-called "lower face" can be consciously controlled much easier than the muscles of the so-called "upper face". And with a smile that seems spurious, certain muscles of the upper face are not involved. As the "most common emotions that you get to see", Krause is calling contempt and disgust, which is likely to be contrary to the everyday theories of laypersons in affect-psychology. However, when people talk about their daily lives, the expression of joy is the most frequently shown emotion. Other situations show different rankings of the affects. Krause emphasizes that what is seen in the face of the person who imagines a specific affect is not inevitably what is experienced. Only in the expression of joy is there congruence with what is visible in the face and what is internally experienced. Not so with the negative emotions: they are shown more often than experienced. Krause states that this will not allow information-sharing about the relationship between the two persons. He refers to old and often confirmed findings of Bühler (1934), according to which in a communication between a "sender" and his "receiver" signs of expression should be interpreted differently: as an "expression for the internal status of the sender", or in his "appeal function" that "should bring the receiver to a specific action", or as a kind of "mental comment" about something "the sender is talking or thinking about". Laughter is "combined with almost any other emotion" in contrast to other affective states.

For Krause's 65th birthday in 2007 Tom Levold of the System Magazine summarizes some of the research results: "It is argued and substantiated by the empirical material that one can explain the persistence of mental disorders in part by the unconscious micro-affective behavior of mentally ill persons that brings their normal partners to confirm their unconscious assumptions about themselves and the world. This is shown in the behavior of various disorders."

Harald Weilnböck cites in his book review of empirical research in psychoanalysis "the level of 'unconscious affective adaptation' that involuntarily takes place in all interactions". He sums up a special research result of Krause with its implications for the therapeutic process: "In Krause's experimental design the facial expressions of laughter and smiles were captured in 15 therapeutic sessions in one-minute intervals and compared with the facial affect behavior of the therapist. The visual representation in form of two diagram-curves illustrates the enormous 'unconscious emotional adjustment' as well as their development in the course of therapy. It can be precisely detected: the more it is possible for the therapist to withdraw the micro-affektive entanglement, the more successful the therapy is."

== Publications ==
- Krause, Rainer (1981). Sprache und Affekt. Untersuchungen über das Stottern [Language and emotion. Investigations about stuttering] (in German). Stuttgart, Berlin, Köln, Mainz: Kohlhammer. ISBN 3-17-005267-5.
- Krause, Rainer; Steimer-Krause, E. (1993). Buchheim, P.; Cierpka, M.; Seifert, Th. (eds.). Affekt und Beziehung [Affect and Relationship] (in German). Heidelberg: Springer. pp. 71–83. ISBN 978-3-642-84909-1.
- Krause, Rainer (1995). Koch, G. (ed.). Gesicht-Affekt-Wahrnehmung und Interaktion [Facial-emotional perception and interaction] (in German). Frankfurt: Fischer. pp. 57–72. ISBN 3-596-12671-1.
- Krause, Rainer (1996). Pawlik, Kurt (ed.). Ausdruckspsychologische Methoden [Expression Psychological Methods] (in German). Vol. 1 (Enzyklopädie der Psychologie ed.). Göttingen: Hogrefe. pp. 577–608. ISBN 978-3-8017-0533-6.
- Krause, Rainer (2011). Franz, Matthias; Karger, Andre (eds.). Affektentwicklung – männliche Stile der Affektregulation [Emotional development - male styles of affect regulation] (in German). Göttingen: Vandenhoeck & Ruprecht. pp. 208–229. ISBN 978-3-525-40440-9.

== Awards ==
- 1991: Advancement award of Deutsche Psychoanalytische Gesellschaft (DPG)
- 2010: Order of Merit of the Federal Republic of Germany
