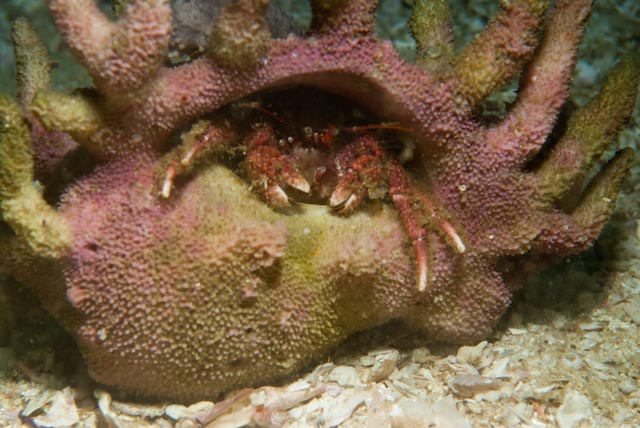
- Hydrocorella africana

Scientific classification
- Kingdom: Animalia
- Phylum: Cnidaria
- Class: Hydrozoa
- Order: Anthoathecata
- Family: Hydractiniidae
- Genus: Hydrocorella; Stechow, 1921

= Hydrocorella =

Genus of hydrozoans

Hydrocorella is a small genus of athecate hydroids in the family Hydractiniidae.

== Species ==
- Hydrocorella africana Stechow, 1921
- Hydrocorella calcarea (Carter, 1977)
- Hydrocorella spinifera (Stechow, 1962)
