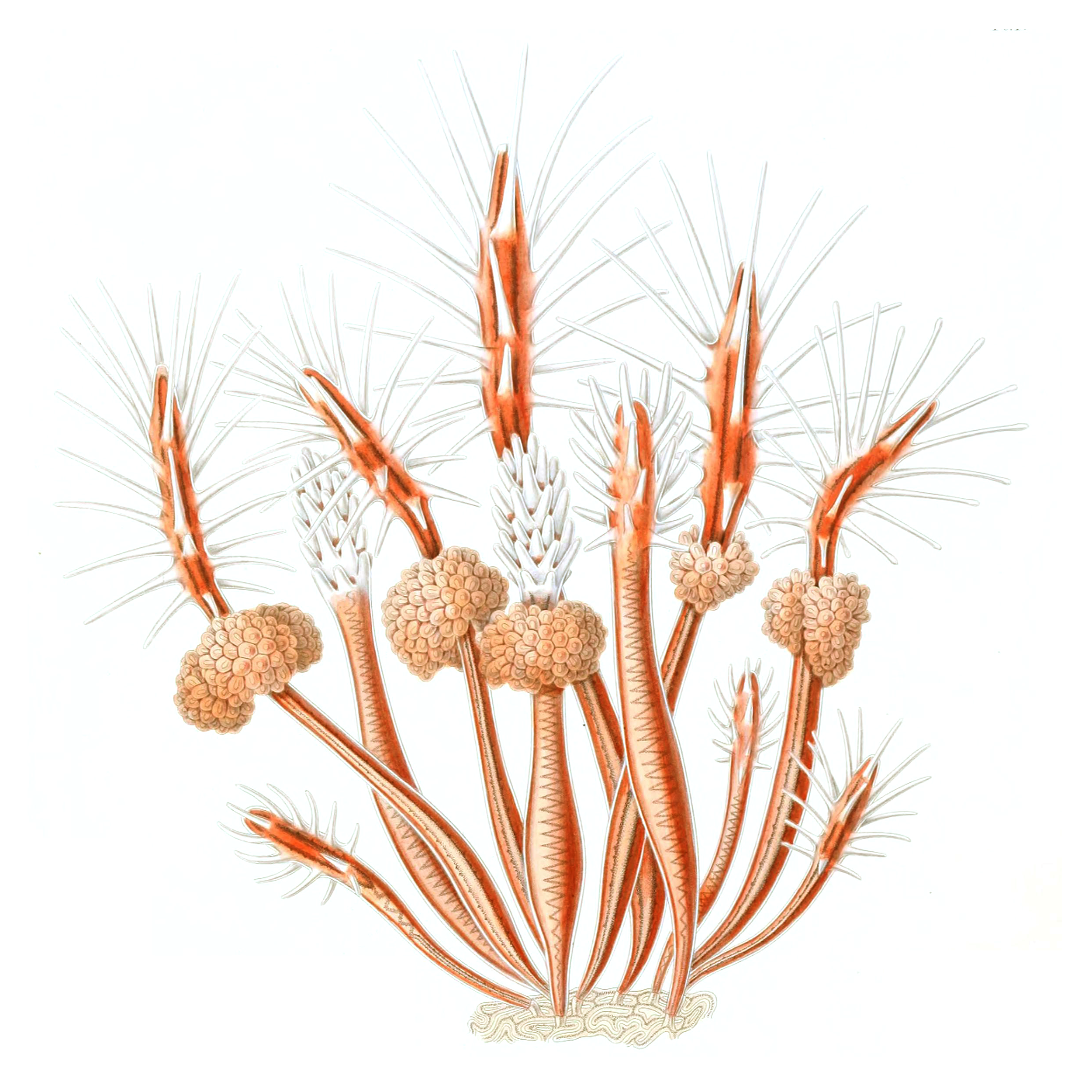
- Male colony painted by G. J. Allman

Scientific classification
- Kingdom: Animalia
- Phylum: Cnidaria
- Class: Hydrozoa
- Order: Anthoathecata
- Family: Hydractiniidae
- Genus: Clava; Gmelin, 1788
- Species: C. multicornis

Binomial name
- Clava multicornis Forsskål, 1775

= Clava multicornis =

Genus of hydrozoans

Clava is a monotypic genus of hydrozoans in the family Hydractiniidae. It contains only one accepted species, Clava multicornis. Other names synonymous with Clava multicornis include Clava cornea, Clava diffusa, Clava leptostyla, Clava nodosa, Clava parasitica, Clava squamata, Coryne squamata, Hydra multicornis, and Hydra squamata. The larvae form of the species has a well developed nervous system compared to its small size. The adult form is also advanced due to its ability to stay dormant during unfavorable periods.

== Anatomy ==
The larval form (planula) and adult form show two different body plans. The planula is a small, free-living larva, and is diploblastic with two layers: the endoderm and ectoderm with an additional mesoglea. The ectoderm thickness decreases from the anterior to posterior poles. Further, the ectoderm has mucous gland cells for secretory purposes, support, and sense along with cnidocytes with nematocysts in the posterior end. The planula remain free-living for a short time, after which they settle onto hard substrate and then complete metamorphosis to become its adult form. During metamorphosis, the species destroys most of its endoderm and ectoderm tissues as it undergoes a massive reorganization of its body. In this form it stays attached to a substrate as a polyp. Features on the polyp include a mouth and tentacles.

== Nervous system ==
The planulae demonstrates cephalization with concentration of neurons and sensory cells in a dome shape at the anterior end. These neurons vary in types and function. These sensory cells may include photoreceptors. Additionally, it is believed that these planulae crawl by secretion of mucous gland cells which are secreted using neurons. During metamorphosis, these neurons move within the organism. This is demonstrated in screening of GLWamide-immunoreactive neurons and RFamide-immunoreactive neurons. GLWamide-immunoreactive neurons display as neurotransmitters in cnidarian organisms. These exist specifically in the polyp form of C. multicornis in the hypostome near the mouth. These will move along the body either upwards above the hypostome or downwards into the column of the polyp. RFamide-immunoreactive neurons demonstrate neurons used for sensory purposes. C. multicornis have less of these neurons than the GLWamide-immnoreactive neurons. These exist in the adult polyp form in the tentacles. These move along the tentacles and into the column of the polyp.

GLWamide-immunoreactive neurons and RFamide-immunoreactive neurons can be affected by treatment of retinoic acid (RA) and Citral. RA prevents sensory cells to differentiate between GLWamide-immunoreactive and RFamide-immunoreactive neurons. This leads to the inability to react to light. Citral causes the embryos of C. multicornis to be shorter and unable to move. This is from a reduction in GLWamide-immunoreactive and RFamide-immunoreactive cells.

== Life cycle ==
Clava multicornis reproduces sexually as the larvae are fertilized in the gonophores on an adult female. The planulae hatch 48–72 hours after. They then develop on the polyp where they are hatched into a 600–800-μm-long tadpole-like larvae. Its body shape is similar to a tadpole in that it tapers from the anterior to the posterior pole. However, its swimming stays close to the substrate and moves by ciliary gliding toward light. It also crawls by using its mucous gland cells. The larvae attaches on the anterior end once it has found an adequate environment to settle. The posterior end then forms the mouth and tentacles. This cnidarian never exhibits a medusa life stage. Sexual reproduction can only be done in the prime temperature range of the species.

Clava multicornis also reproduces asexually through budding from its polyp form. The asexual reproduction cycle reaches maximum reproduction rates at about 39 days in temperatures on the higher scale of their prime range. However, the species can reproduce asexually in a wider range of temperatures than during sexual reproduction.

== Behavior ==
=== Locomotion ===
As planulae crawl along the substrate with ciliary gliding, they move with their anterior end forward. This movement demonstrates a left and right bending in order to glide forward. Once in the adult polyp form, they stay attached to the substrate throughout the rest of their life. Additionally, these planulae exhibit positive phototactic behavior (moving towards the light source). They have become a model for determining effects of retinoic acid (used to regulate physiological processes in chordates) on this phototropic behavior.

=== Environment ===
During settlement of the planulae, C. multicornis tends to settle in colonies. Additionally, they settle during periods of higher tides rather than lower tides. This is because they prefer to settle when algae are in a sloped or vertical position. This position is likely when sea level rises and fronds float vertically.

In unfavorable time-periods of their environment, adult forms of C. multicornis can become dormant in order to survive. Their hydranth, a feeding zooid, rests in the stolon and begins to emerge once the environment is safe again. Regeneration of their colonies follows this time period. Because of this ability to become dormant, they have been found to live in the Arctic.

== Habitat ==
Clava multicornis are sensitive to temperature. In their prime temperature range of 12 °C to 17 °C, the species can withstand many salinities ranging from 16 ppt to 40 ppt. However, the species can flourish in 32 ppt environments. One specific environment that they have been found in is the Arctic. They attach to algal species including Ascophyllum nodosum and Fucus vesiculosus.

The species tends to live in sheltered areas on algae away from shores because the planulae cannot settle when there is too much wave action. They can only feed efficiently in lesser currents because their tentacles become deformed from intense waves, causing their size to diminish. Further, when the planula larvae develop, they settle close to the bottom and middle of the algae since they are fragile against waves. They also may live away from shores because they are fragile to solar radiation.

This species also houses other invertebrates. One known species is the larvae of Pycnogonum litorale, a sea spider who lives as an ectoparasite on C. multicornis either in its stolon or hydrocaulus.

== Phylogeny ==
Clava multicornis was originally specified under the family Clavidae but it was moved to family Hydractiniidae due to its similarities to other members of this family. The similarities that placed them in the family include having stolons growing off of its skeleton and a variation in the formation of polyps. The most recent study from 2015 confirmed this, placing the species also in Filifera III.

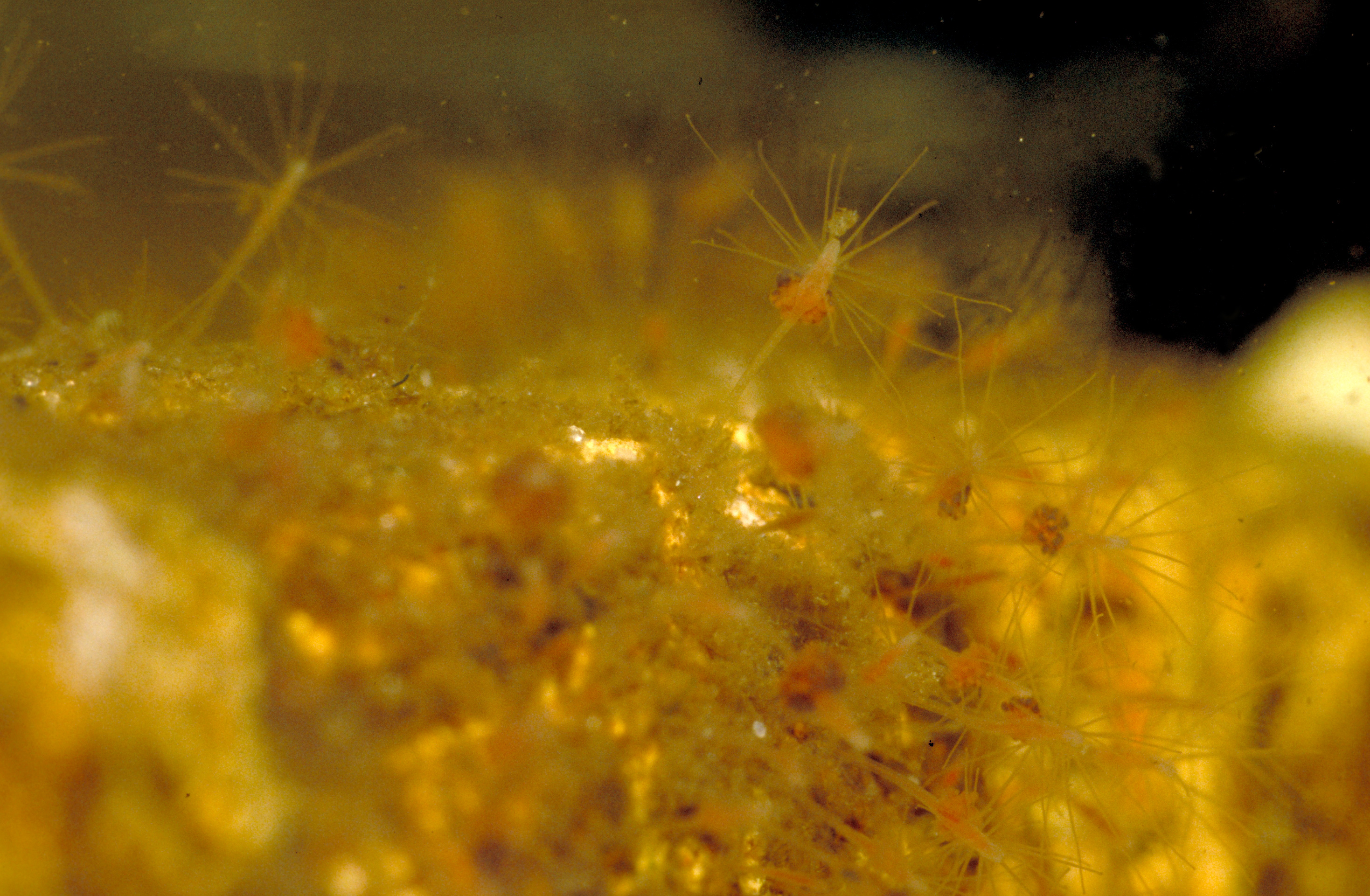

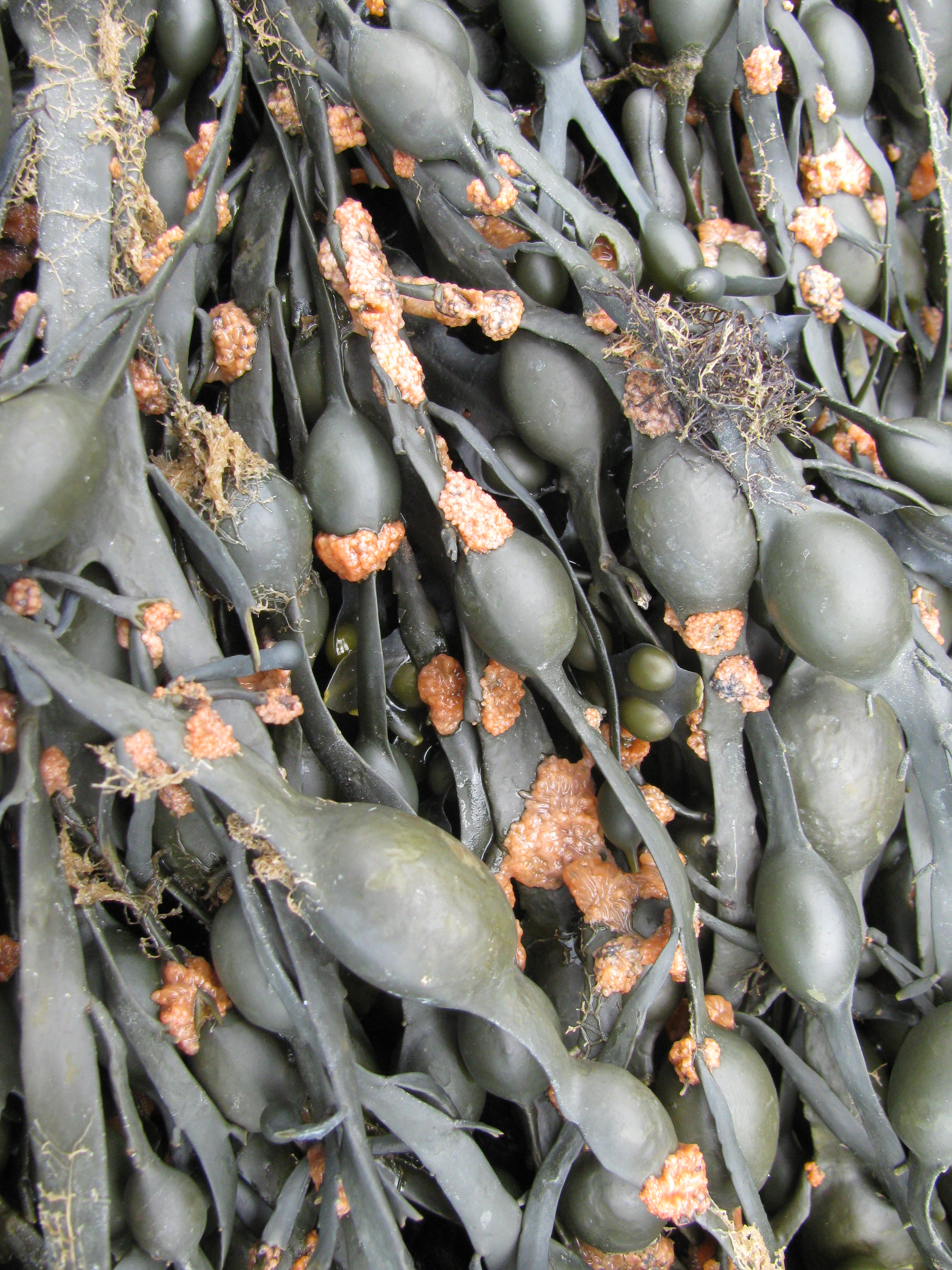
