= Stylactis =

Scientific classification
- Kingdom: Animalia
- Phylum: Cnidaria
- Class: Hydrozoa
- Order: Anthoathecata
- Family: Hydractiniidae
- Genus: Stylactis; Allman, 1864

Genus of hydrozoans

Stylactis is a genus of hydrozoans belonging to the family Hydractiniidae.

The species of this genus are found in Europe and Northern America.

Species:

- Stylactaria hooperii Sigerfoos, 1899
- Stylactis fucicola (M. Sars, 1857)
- Stylactis inermis Allman, 1872
