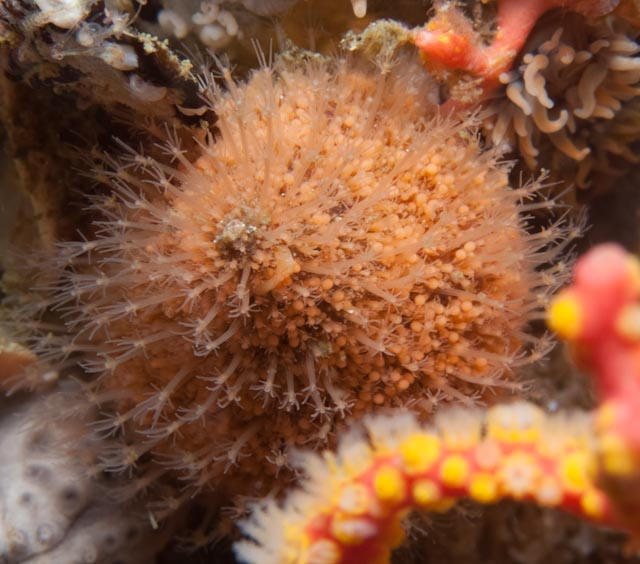

Scientific classification
- Kingdom: Animalia
- Phylum: Cnidaria
- Class: Hydrozoa
- Order: Anthoathecata
- Family: Hydractiniidae
- Genus: Hydractinia
- Species: H. altispina

Binomial name
- Hydractinia altispina Millard, 1955

= Hydractinia altispina =

Species of cnidarian

Hydractinia altispina, or high-spined commensal hydroid, is a small colonial hydroid in the family Hydractiniidae.

== Description ==
High-spined commensal hydroids grow as a fuzzy-looking orange coat usually on the shell of a marine snail, the scaly dogwhelk Nucella squamosa. Individual polyps grow to 0.4 cm in total height. The polyps are naked and cluster on the shell surface, interspersed with defensive spines and tiny ball-like reproductive structures.

== Distribution ==
This colonial animal is found only off the southern African coast from Luderitz to False Bay, Cape Town subtidally and to at least 30m under water.
