= Hippothoa =

Scientific classification
- Kingdom: Animalia
- Phylum: Bryozoa
- Class: Gymnolaemata
- Order: Cheilostomatida
- Family: Hippothoidae
- Genus: Hippothoa; Lamouroux, 1821

Genus of bryozoans

Hippothoa is a genus of bryozoans belonging to the family Hippothoidae.

The genus has cosmopolitan distribution.

Species:

- Hippothoa annularis
- Hippothoa balanophila Winston & Hakansson, 1986
- Hippothoa borealis d'Orbigny, 1852
- Hippothoa brasiliensis Morris, 1980
- Hippothoa calcicola Winston & Vieira, 2013
- Hippothoa calciophilia Gordon, 1984
- Hippothoa catophilia Gordon, 2020
- Hippothoa discreta
- Hippothoa distans MacGillivray, 1869
- Hippothoa divaricata Lamouroux, 1821
- Hippothoa divaricata Smitt, 1868
- Hippothoa eburnea (Canu & Bassler, 1928)
- Hippothoa expansa Dawson, 1859
- Hippothoa flagellum Manzoni, 1870
- Hippothoa fusiformis d'Orbigny, 1852
- Hippothoa holostoma
- Hippothoa imperforata Liu, 2001
- Hippothoa longicauda Fischer, 1870
- Hippothoa longicauda Souto, Berning & Ostrovsky, 2016
- Hippothoa mawatarii Dick & Ross, 1988
- Hippothoa meridionalis Morris, 1980
- Hippothoa minitumulosa Morris, 1980
- Hippothoa muricata
- Hippothoa muripinnata Souto, Reverter-Gil & Ostrovsky, 2014
- Hippothoa musivaria Hayward & Fordy, 1982
- Hippothoa naredensis Terawi & Srivastava, 1967
- Hippothoa parvipora Canu & Lecointre, 1928
- Hippothoa peristomata Gordon, 1984
- Hippothoa petrophila Dick & Grischenko, 2016
- Hippothoa planula Canu, 1926
- Hippothoa rudis Canu & Lecointre, 1928
- Hippothoa rugulosa
- Hippothoa santacruzana Pinter, 1973
- Hippothoa savignyana d'Orbigny, 1852
- Hippothoa temnichorda (Ulrich & Bassler, 1907)
- Hippothoa tuberculata
- Hippothoa watersi Morris, 1980
