= Hippothoidae =

Scientific classification
- Kingdom: Animalia
- Phylum: Bryozoa
- Class: Gymnolaemata
- Order: Cheilostomatida
- Family: Hippothoidae

Family of bryozoans

Hippothoidae is a family of bryozoans belonging to the order Cheilostomatida.

Genera:

- Antarctothoa Moyano, 1987
- Austrothoa Moyano, 1987
- Celleporella Gray, 1848
- Dacryoporella Bassler, 1935
- Dacryoporella Lang, 1934
- Haplota Marcus, 1940
- Hippothoa Lamouroux, 1821
- Jessethoa Gordon, 2020
- Laterotecatia Voigt, 1979
- Neothoa Moyano, 1987
- Plesiothoa Gordon & Hastings, 1979
