= FOM University of Applied Sciences =

German university

- Other names: FOM
- Type: Private
- Established: 1993
- Chancellor: Harald Beschorner
- Rector: Burghard Hermeier
- Students: 47,000 (December 2024)
- Location: Leimkugelstraße 6, 45141, Essen, North Rhine-Westphalia, Germany; 51.47387°N 7.00468°E
- Campus: Urban
- Website: www.fom-international.com

The FOM University of Applied Sciences (German: FOM Hochschule für Oekonomie & Management; stylized as FOM) is one of Germany's largest private universities with more than 47,000 students. The Fachhochschule is privately run, works in close co-operation with other universities, and is state recognized. Also it has the biggest economic and business sciences faculty in Germany.

The majority of students are working professionals. The range of courses offered centers on business, business administration, economic psychology and engineering. The FOM, founded in 1993, has traditionally close relationships with many major German companies.

== History ==
Old logo

The university was founded in Essen in 1990 in order to cater to working people. On 18 September 1993 it received state recognition and in September 1994 it began operating. In the first year, there were 149 students studying Master of Business Administration. In 1998 they began to expand to other sites outside Essen. In 2005 they began offering courses in engineering in association with the Ruhr University Bochum.

In 2012, the university sued a former student for being too fast when completing 11 semesters worth of studies in only 4 semesters.

The FOM is accredited by the Foundation for International Business Administration Accreditation since 2006 as well as the German Science and Humanities Council since 2004.

== Locations ==
The main faculty is located in Essen. There are 33 other schools in Germany, located in Aachen, Arnsberg, Augsburg, Berlin, Bochum, Bonn, Bremen, Cologne, Dortmund, Duisburg, Düsseldorf, Frankfurt am Main, Freiburg, Gütersloh, Hagen, Hamburg, Hanover, Herne, Karlsruhe, Kassel, Koblenz, Leipzig, Mainz, Mannheim, Marl, Munich, Münster, Neuss, Nuremberg, Oberhausen, Saarbrücken, Siegen, Stuttgart, Wesel and Wuppertal. There is also an FOM in Vienna and in Luxembourg.

=== China ===
Since 2003 FOM has had two faculties in China, one near Beijing and the other in the Shandong province in co-operation with the Shanghai University of Finance and Economics.

== Industry partners ==
The FOM has partnerships with more than 700 companies including 3M, Allianz, Deutsche Bank, RWE, Siemens, Deutsche Bahn, Bayer, HSBC Trinkaus, ThyssenKrupp, BMW, Vodafone, Ford, Deloitte and Ernst & Young.

== Scientific facilities and research institutes ==
The university maintains a total of 11 research institutes and 15 "competence centers":

- dips Deutsches Institut für Portfolio-Strategien

Research emphasis on financial portfolio management, quantitative modeling and asset management.

- iap Institut für Arbeit und Personal

Research emphasis on organization and employee relations, with an emphasis on the organization of worktime.

- ild Institut für Logistik und Dienstleistungsmanagement

Research emphasis on logistics, service management, and operation research.

- ipo Institut für Personal- und Organisationforschung

Research emphasis on employee and organizational theory, with emphasis on incentive systems and knowledge management.

- ild Institut für Logistik und Dienstleistungsmanagement
- iaim Institute of Automation & Industrial Management
- ifes Institut für Empirie & Statistik
- ifgs Institut für Gesundheit & Soziales
- ifid Institut für IT-Management & Digitalisierung
- ifpm Institut für Public Management
- isf Institute for Strategic Finance
- iwp Institut für Wirtschaftspsychologie
- mis Institute of Management & Information Systems
- KCAT KompetenzCentrum für Accounting & Taxation
- KCBT German-Sino Competence Center of Business & Technology
- KCC KompetenzCentrum für Corporate Social Responsibility
- KCD KompetenzCentrum für Didaktik in der Hochschullehre für Berufstätige
- KCE KompetenzCentrum für Entrepreneurship & Mittelstand
- KCFM KompetenzCentrum für Future Mobility
- KCI KompetenzCentrum für interdisziplinäre Wirtschaftsforschung & Verhaltensoekonomie
- KCM KompetenzCentrum für Medizinoekonomie
- KCMS KompetenzCentrum für Marketing & Sales Management
- KCN KompetenzCentrum für nachhaltige Entwicklung
- KCQF KompetenzCentrum für Qualitative Forschung (Scientific directors: Prof. Dr. Ulrike Schwegler & Prof. Dr. Gernot Schiefer)
- KCT KompetenzCentrum für Technologie- & Innovationsmanagement
- KCU KompetenzCentrum für Unternehmensführung & Corporate Governance
- KCV KompetenzCentrum für angewandte Volkswirtschaftslehre (Scientific directors: Prof. Dr. Christina Wilke & Prof. Dr. Monika Wohlmann)
- KCW KompetenzCentrum für Wirtschaftsrecht

The FOM is member of the Stifterverband für die Deutsche Wissenschaft and the Erasmus Programme.
