= International Psychoanalytic University Berlin =

Private non-profit university in Berlin, Germany

Coordinates: 52.523696°N 13.343292°E

International Psychoanalytic University Berlin (IPU Berlin)
- The Psychoanalytic University in Berlin
- Type: Private
- Established: 2009
- Chancellor: Beate Ella Deppe
- President: Jan-Hendrik Olbertz
- Vice-president: Birgit Stuermer
- Academic staff: 62 (2025)
- Administrative staff: 89 (2025)
- Students: 858 (2023/2024)
- Location: Berlin, Germany
- Website: ipu-berlin.de/en

International Psychoanalytic University Berlin (IPU Berlin or IPU) is a private non-profit university in Berlin, Germany. The university is administered by International Psychoanalytic University Berlin gGmbH, whose sole shareholder is currently the Foundation to Promote University Psychoanalysis. This foundation was established by Christa Rohde-Dachser. The founding president of the IPU Berlin is Jürgen Körner.

IPU Berlin has been state-recognized and was awarded its institutional accreditation by the German Council of Science and Humanities in November 2014.

== History ==
The International Psychoanalytic University Berlin was founded in 2009 with the aim of restoring psychoanalysis as a central discipline within psychology and social sciences. Initiated by Christa Rohde-Dachser and Jürgen Körner, the university was established by the "Gesellschaft zur Förderung der universitären Psychoanalyse mbH" (Limited Liability Society to Promote University Psychoanalysis) which was later renamed to "International Psychoanalytic University Berlin gGmbH". The university officially began its teaching and research activities in the autumn of 2009, initially launching with a master's program in clinical psychology. Over the years, IPU Berlin has expanded its academic portfolio to include undergraduate, graduate, and doctoral programs, emphasizing interdisciplinary connections between psychoanalysis, psychology, cultural studies, and the social sciences.

== Study Programs ==
The International Psychoanalytic University Berlin offers a diverse array of study programs that integrate psychoanalytic principles with various disciplines. These programs are designed to provide both theoretical knowledge and practical application, catering to a wide range of academic and professional interests.

Bachelor's Program:

- BSc Psychology PLUS: This undergraduate program offers education in psychology.

Master's Programs:

- MA Psychology – Clinical Psychology and Psychotherapy: Starting in the winter semester of 2021-2022, this program focuses on clinical psychology and psychotherapy, equipping students with the skills necessary for therapeutic practice and research.
- MA Psychology (English Track): This master's program, conducted entirely in English, emphasizes a clinical focus, making it accessible to international students and those seeking an English-language curriculum.
- MA Psychology Focusing on Organisation – Transformation Processes in Work, Society, and Environment: This multidisciplinary program explores organizational psychology, examining transformation processes within work, societal, and environmental contexts.
- MA Leadership and Consulting: Formerly known as Organizational Studies, this program delves into organizational development through a psychodynamic approach, preparing students for leadership and consultancy roles.
- MA Interdisciplinary Psychosis Therapy: Previously titled Integrated Care of Psychotically Ill Persons, this program emphasizes multiprofessional work for individuals with psychoses, promoting integrated therapeutic approaches.
- MA Cultural Studies: Designed as a part-time course parallel to full-time employment, this program offers an in-depth exploration of cultural studies from a psychoanalytic perspective.

== Research ==
In addition to the Erich Fromm Study Center, IPU Berlin engages in various research projects that explore psychoanalysis as a social science, psychotherapeutic approach, and cultural theory. The university emphasizes interdisciplinarity, practical relevance, and internationalization in its research endeavors.

== International ==
The university has established cooperative agreements with institutions worldwide, facilitating student and faculty exchanges, joint research projects, and cross-cultural academic initiatives. These partnerships span various countries, including Argentina, Austria, Belgium, Bosnia, Bulgaria, Chile, Colombia, Czech Republic, France, Hungary, Italy, Poland, Serbia, Slovakia, Spain, Sudan, Sweden, and Turkey.

== Ranking ==
IPU Berlin's MA Psychology course was ranked first in the 2016 CHE University Ranking among Germany's psychology master programs.
