= Morphological psychology =

Morphological psychology claims to be one of the most recent full psychology theories. It was developed in the 1960s by Professor Wilhelm Salber at the University of Cologne, Germany. In his understanding, morphology is the science of the structure of living things. "Morphing" describes the seamless transition from one state or appearance into another. Like the morphing technique used in films, morphological psychology studies the structures of our psyche and aims to understand the transitions, the metamorphosis of our mind.

Morphological psychology recognizes that the mind is in a constant state of flux, being shaped and shaping at the same time. It is a psychological theory that considers our mental workings as a dynamic system. Morphology asserts that we are in a constant state of change throughout our life. In every millisecond we experience entire psychological worlds. The only constant in life is change, and Salber has taken this principle to morphological psychology.

== Motivations ==
Morphological psychology identifies six motivations (Kerngestalten) which provide a natural framework for the mind, and defines their relationship to each other to explain the mind's holistic workings. It is within these six motivations that we literally "make up our mind".

Each of these motivations is a gestalt in itself that influences the whole. Salber calls these the Wirkungseinheiten or "impact units". According to morphological thinking, it is these Gestalten that are the rich building material for our mind's mental productions. The entire motivational framework can be visualised in a hexagon shape to allow analysis and understanding of how each of the six motivations influence and often battle each other.

The six motivations can also be viewed as three interrelated pairs:

- Acquisition and Transformation
- Impact and Structure
- Expansion and Resources

Because of its emphasis on psychological "tensions", morphology is also often called the "psychology of force interplay" (Psychologie des Kraftspiels).

== History ==
As with other new psychological theories, morphology has taken some time to be developed and accepted outside of Germany. Over the last 40 years morphological psychology has entered various applications of psychology including psychoanalysis and therapy, workplace and HR and marketing (Gesellschaft fuer Morphologische Psychologie).

However, since the turn of this century, the theory of morphological psychology has found greater international acceptance through the use of its principles in market research and marketing strategy. Morphological psychology increases the effectiveness of research and marketing strategy because of its understanding of human behaviour.

When Professor Salber, a scholar of Anna Freud, researched human motivations ("why do people think and do what they do"), he analysed everyday lives and activities (Grauer Alltag) including behaviour like shaving, eating, cleaning and dressing. From this research, Professor Salber was able to develop a new, comprehensive theory of the workings of our mind.

Morphological psychology has its roots in Goethe's morphology of plant life, the French moralists, and humanists like Nietzsche.

Its conceptual framework builds on Freud's concept of Gestalt psychology: finding the systems and logic that impact creation and re-creation. Morphological methodology is the "reconstruction of the art of the mind". In order to understand the logic of our psyche, we need to understand how these worlds form and diminish and transition into the next world. Salber called these Stundenwelten (Hour worlds – meaning "being fully immersed in one 'world', like reading a book, and the next hour transitioning into the next 'world', like doing the finances"). In analysing these "psychological worlds", description seeks to grasp the movement of the phenomenal forms, which then have to be transformed into explanatory reconstructions through several intermediary steps. This means that morphology uses rich descriptions to grasp the dynamics of our mind. These descriptions are then transformed into explanations through analytical steps.

== Applications ==
=== Clinical ===
Morphological psychology is applied in clinical application of psychoanalysis and therapy, as well as more alternative applications like music therapy. Through the understanding of the motivational framework, which is individually developed since early childhood, a person's often conflicting motivations can be revealed and analysed. Through this process, registered psychologists can help clients understand themselves and develop solutions in the change and negotiation of these motivations.

=== Social, arts and media ===
Morphological psychology has been used widely to understand social issues and to develop strategies for behaviour change. Morphological psychology recognises social behaviour in the context of ancient motivations, the cultural ebb and current motivations. In media, it is used for analysis as well as in advisory for the development of storylines and components for movies, TV and other media.

=== Market research ===
Dr. Christoph Melchers is credited with the establishment of morphological psychology in market research with the formation of Institut fur Marktpsychology (ifm), Freiburg in 1979.

Morphology asserts that each market has its own psycho-logic and motivations.

A fundamental part of morphological psychology application is the inclusion of in-depth, one on one interviews of 90–120 minutes. Through the use of an evolving, topical discussion guide and psychoanalytical tools, the motivational system around the topic, be it a brand, safety, work or advertising, is explored. With up to 95% of our motivations being unconscious, this process is considered critical in uncovering what is at work deep down in our minds.
