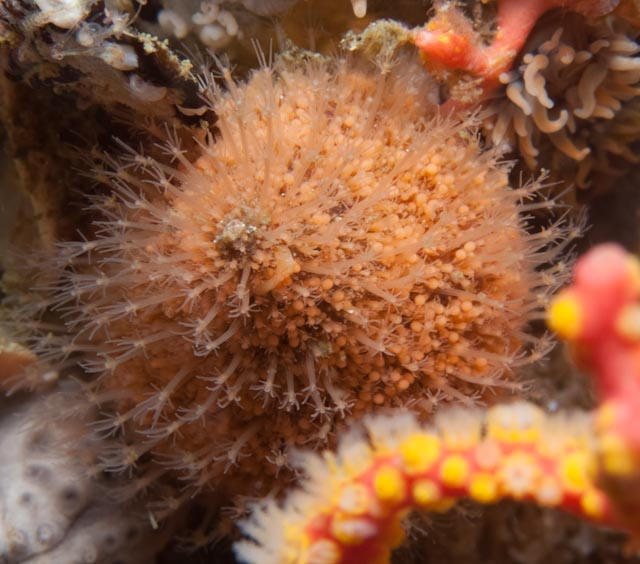
- Hydractinia altispina

Scientific classification
- Kingdom: Animalia
- Phylum: Cnidaria
- Class: Hydrozoa
- Order: Anthoathecata
- Family: Hydractiniidae
- Genus: Hydractinia van Beneden, 1841

Species
- See text

Synonyms
- List: Cionistes Wright, 1861; Echinochorium Hassall, 1841; Euhydractinia Broch, 1910; Halorhiza Stechow, 1962; Hydrodendrium Nutting, 1906; Hydronema Stechow, 1921; Nuttingia Stechow, 1909; Podocorella Stechow, 1921; Synhydra Quatrefages, 1843

= Hydractinia =

Genus of hydrozoans

Hydractinia is a genus of commensal athecate hydroids which belong to the family Hydractiniidae. Hydractinia species mostly live on hermit-crabbed marine gastropod shells.

One species, Hydractinia echinata, is commonly known as snail fur. Another species, H. minoi, is known to be commensal with stingfishes of the genus Minous.

== Species ==
- H. aculeata
- H. aggregata
- H. altispina
- H. anechinata
- H. angusta
- H. apicata
- H. arctica
- H. arge
- H. armata
- H. bayeri
- H. betkensis
- H. brachyurae
- H. californica
- H. canalifera
- H. carica
- H. carolinae
- H. constrictura
- H. cryptogonia
- H. cytaeiformis
- H. denhami
- H. diogenes
- H. disjuncta
- H. dongshanensis
- H. echinata
- H. epidocleensis
- H. epispongia
- H. gorgonoides
- H. granulata
- H. guangxiensis
- H. hancocki
- H. inabai
- H. ingolfi
- H. kaffraria
- H. laevispina
- H. longispina
- H. mar
- H. marsupialia
- H. michaelseni
- H. minoi
- H. moniliformis
- H. monocarpa
- H. monoon
- H. multispina
- H. multitentaculata
- H. munita
- H. nagaoensis
- H. novaezelandiae
- H. ocellata
- H. otagoensis
- H. pacifica
- H. parvispina
- H. paucispinata
- H. phialiformis
- H. phyllosoma
- H. piscicola
- H. polycarpa
- H. polyclina
- H. polytentaculata
- H. proboscidea
- H. prolifica
- H. promiscua
- H. quadrigemina
- H. recurvatus
- H. rugosa
- H. sandrae
- H. sarsii
- H. spinipapillaris
- H. spiralis
- H. symbiolongicarpus
- H. symbiopollicaris
- H. taiwanensis
- H. thatcheri
- H. uniformis
- H. valens
- H. vallini
- H. verdi
- H. yerii
