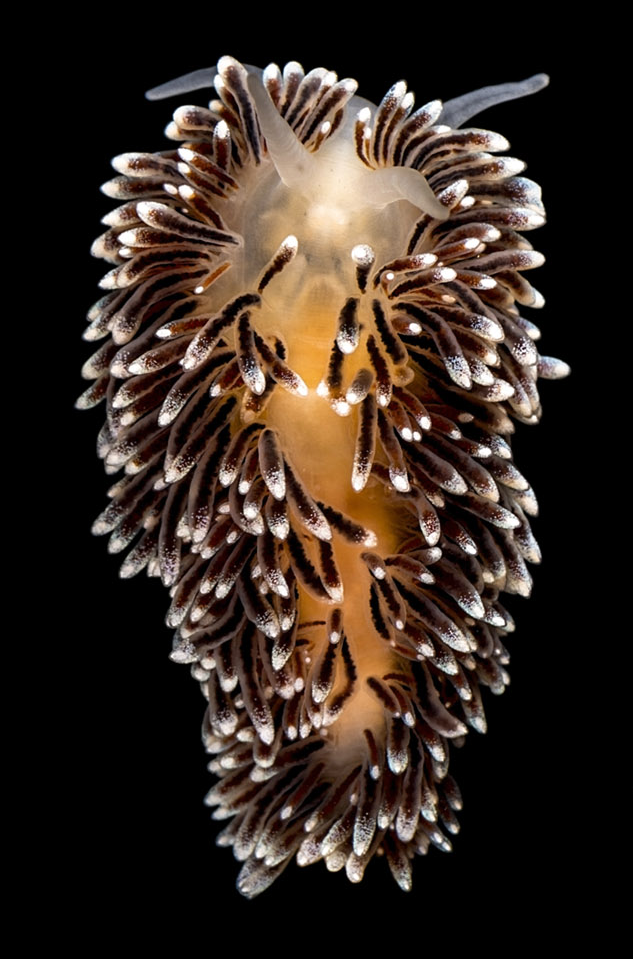
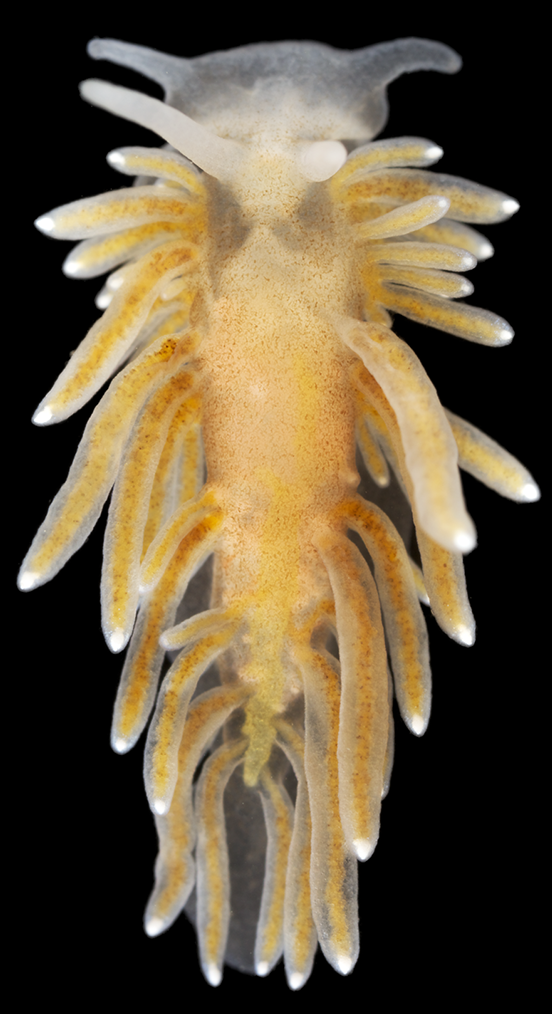
- From left to right: Cuthona nana, and Bohuslania matsmichaeli

Scientific classification
- Kingdom: Animalia
- Phylum: Mollusca
- Class: Gastropoda
- Order: Nudibranchia
- Suborder: Aeolidacea
- Superfamily: Fionoidea
- Family: Cuthonidae; Odhner, 1934

Genera
- See Genera

= Cuthonidae =

Family of gastropods

Cuthonidae is a family of nudibranchs, shell-less marine gastropod molluscs or sea slugs, within the superfamily Fionoidea.

== Taxonomic history ==
This family was reinstated as a result of a molecular phylogenetics study.

== Genera ==
Genera within the family Cuthonidae include:

- Bohuslania Korshunova, Lundin, Malmberg, Picton & Martynov, 2018
- Cuthona Alder & Hancock, 1855
