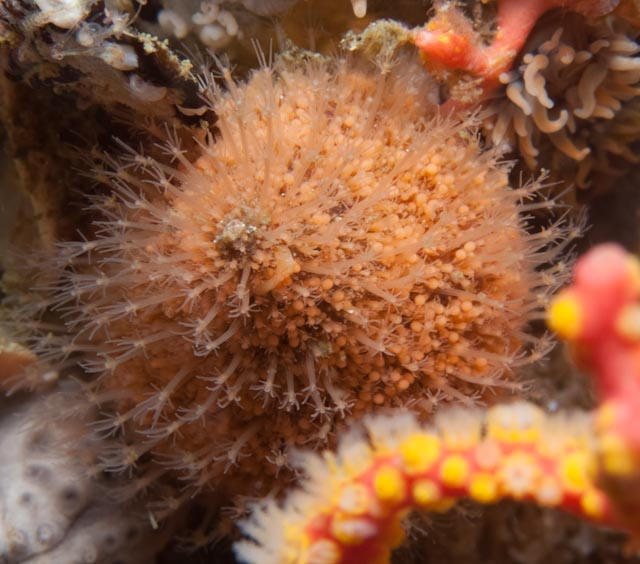
- Hydractinia altispina

Scientific classification
- Kingdom: Animalia
- Phylum: Cnidaria
- Class: Hydrozoa
- Order: Anthoathecata
- Suborder: Filifera
- Family: Hydractiniidae; L. Agassiz, 1862

Genera
- see text

Synonyms
- Clavidae McCrady, 1859

= Hydractiniidae =

Family of hydrozoans

Hydractiniidae is a cnidarian family of athecate hydroids.

== Genera ==
The World Register of Marine Species includes the following genera in the family:

- Bouillonactinia Miglietta, McNally & Cunningham, 2010
- Clava Gmelin, 1788
- Clavactinia Thornely, 1904
- Cnidostoma Vanhöffen, 1911
- Distichozoon Cairns, 2015
- Fiordlandia Schuchert, 1996
- Hydractinia Van Beneden, 1844
- Hydrissa Stechow, 1922
- Hydrocorella Stechow, 1921
- Janaria Stechow, 1921
- Parahydractinia Xu & Huang, 2006
- Podocoryna M. Sars, 1846
- Schuchertinia Miglietta, McNally & Cunningham, 2010
- Stylactis Allman, 1864
