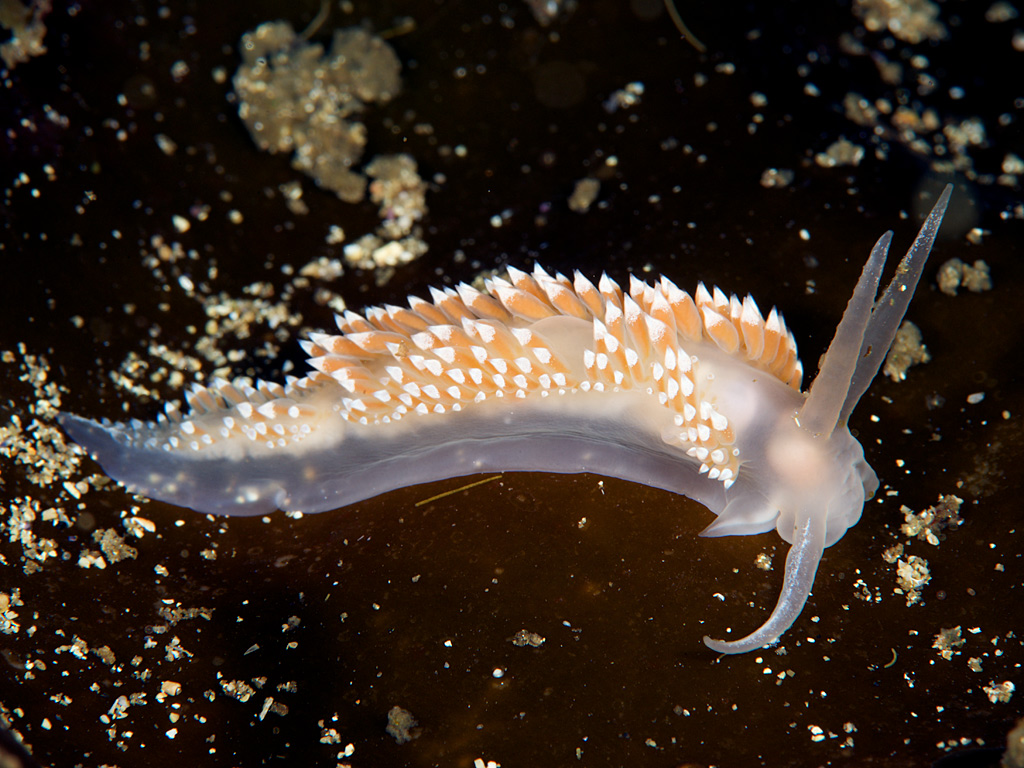
- Coryphella verrucosa

Scientific classification
- Kingdom: Animalia
- Phylum: Mollusca
- Class: Gastropoda
- Order: Nudibranchia
- Suborder: Aeolidacea
- Superfamily: Flabellinoidea
- Family: Coryphellidae; Bergh, 1889
- Genus: Coryphella; M.E. Gray, 1850

= Coryphella =

Genus of gastropods

Coryphella is a genus of sea slugs, specifically aeolid nudibranchs, marine gastropod molluscs in the family Coryphellidae.

== Taxonomy ==
Coryphella was originally described in an 1850 paper, and included three original species; Coryphella landsburgii, Coryphella rufobranchialis, and Coryphella pellucida. The family Coryphellidae was first established in 1889 by Rudolph Bergh, and was re-established in a 2017 study. Molecular studies have found that many existing genera were actually synonymous with Coryphella, leading to many genera being merged. However, these studies had failed to take morphological analysis into account, the "lumping" of several genera under Coryphella leading to loss of differentiation. Thus in a 2025 study, after full molecular and morphological analysis, the genus Coryphella was restricted, previously synonymized genera reinstated, and two new genera established.

== Species ==
According to Korshunova et al. (2025), species within the genus Coryphella are as follows:

- Coryphella longicaudata O'Donoghue, 1922
- Coryphella pseudoverrucosa Martynov, Sanamyan & Korshunova, 2015
- Coryphella verrucosa M. Sars, 1829

Genus incertae sedis currently under Coryphella include:

- Coryphella abei Baba, 1987
- Coryphella alderi Adams, 1861
- Coryphella pallida A. E. Verrill, 1900
- Coryphella subrosacea Eschscholtz, 1831

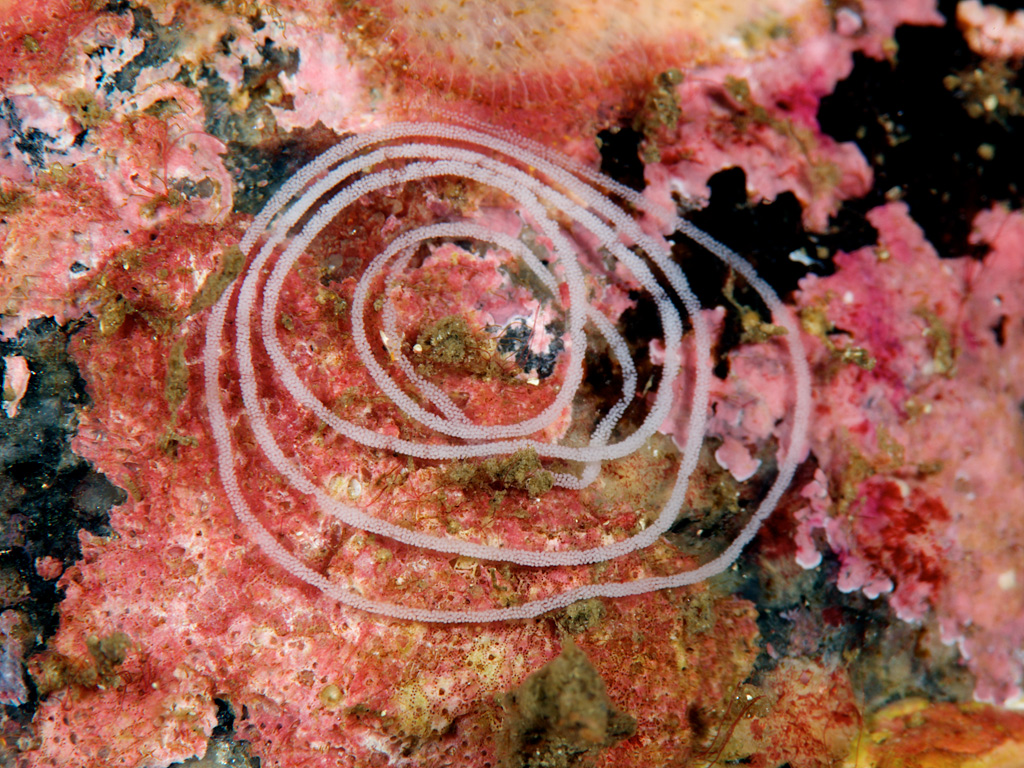
Coryphella verrucosa, spawn, Gulen Dive Resort, Norway

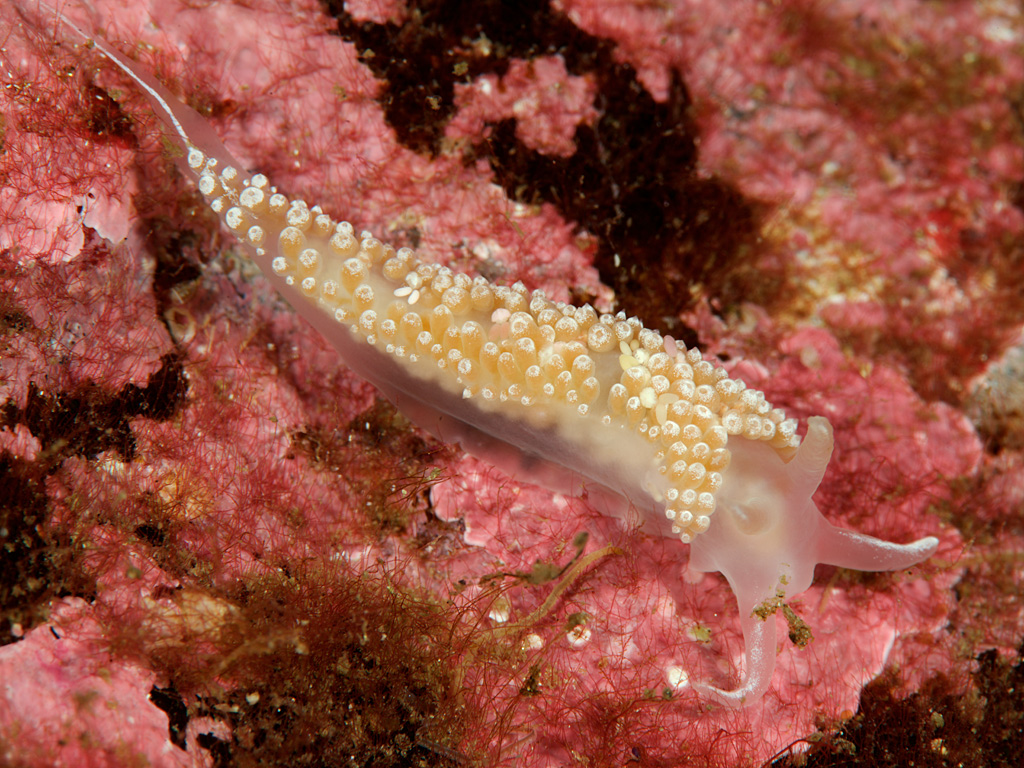
Coryphella verrucosa, Gulen Dive Resort, Norway

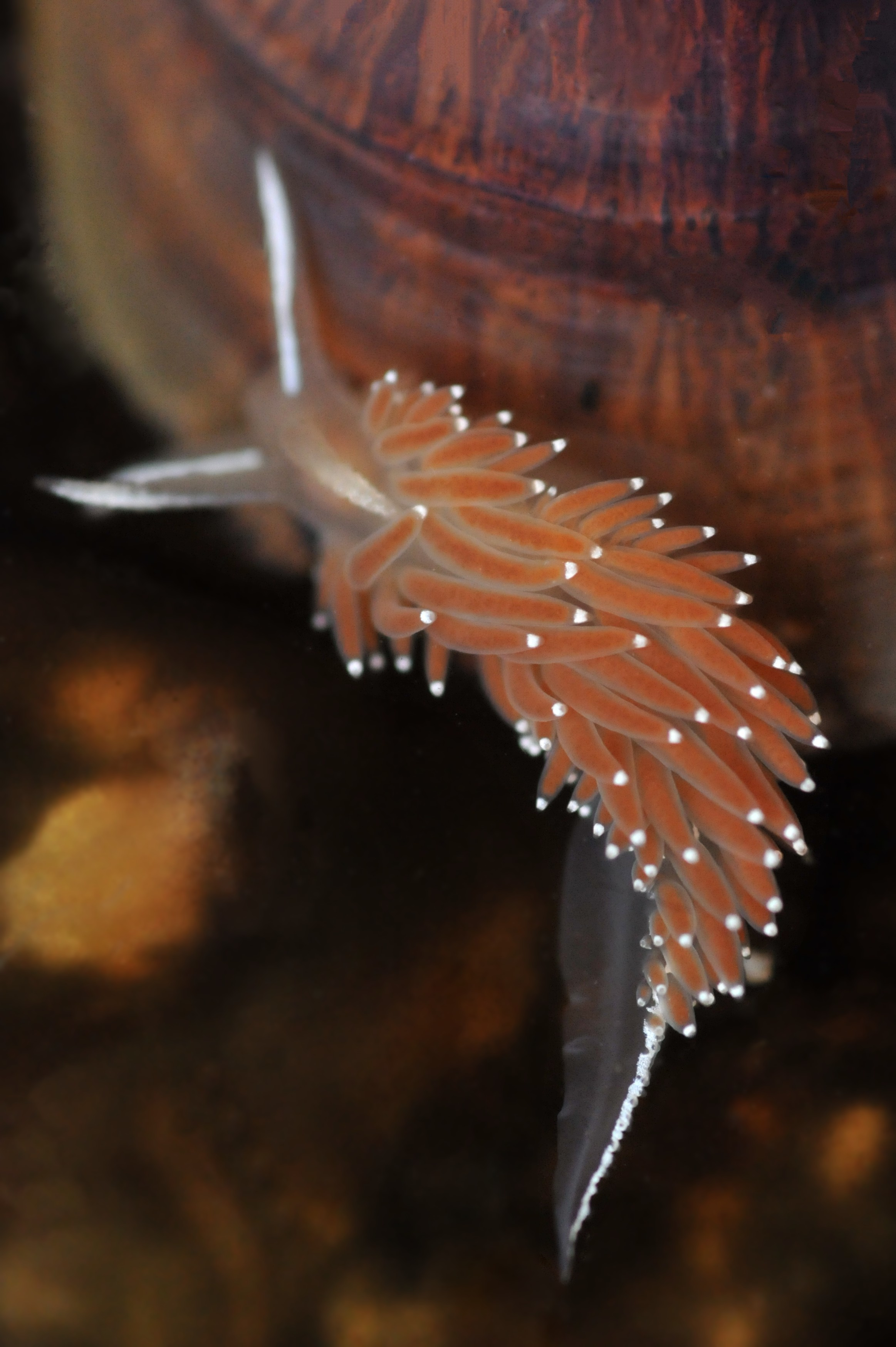
Coryphella verrucosa, British Columbia

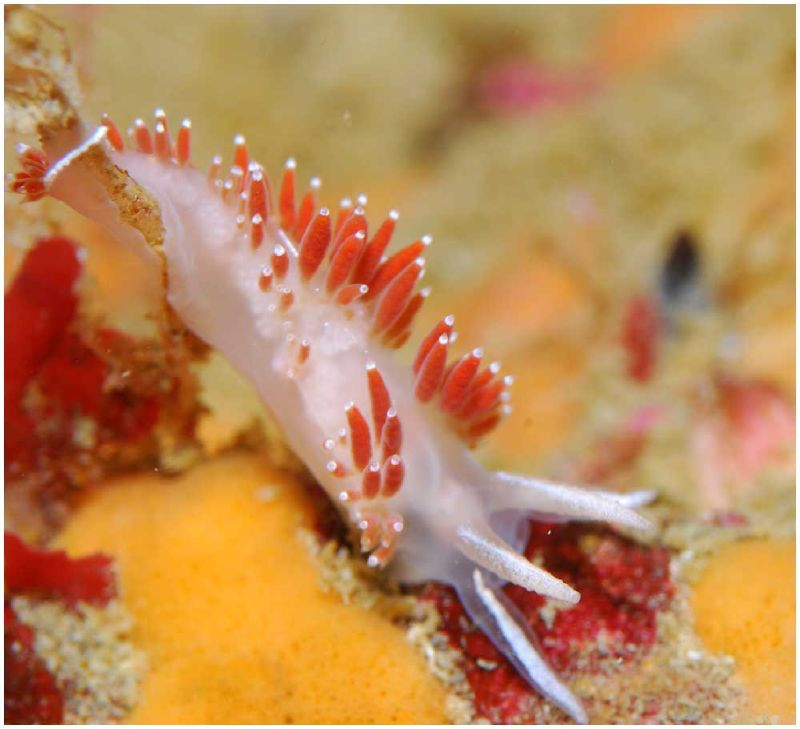
Coryphella verrucosa, Kenai Fjords national Park, Alaska

Species currently brought into synonymy:

- Coryphella albomarginata M. C. Miller, 1971: synonym of Coryphellina albomarginata
- Coryphella alexanderi Ekimova, 2022: synonym of Corrupta alexanderi
- Coryphella amabilis (Hirano & Kuzirian, 1991): synonym of Microchlamylla amabilis
- Coryphella athadona Bergh, 1875: synonym of Occidenthella athadona
- Coryphella beaumonti Eliot, 1906: synonym of Cumanotus beaumonti
- Coryphella borealis Odhner, 1922: synonym of Gulenia borealis
- Coryphella bostoniensis Couthouy, 1838: synonym of Facelina bostoniensis
- Coryphella browni Picton, 1980: synonym of Fjordia browni
- Coryphella californica Bergh, 1904: synonym of Flabellinopsis iodinea J. G. Cooper, 1863
- Coryphella capensis Thiele, 1925: synonym of Fjordia capensis
- Coryphella chriskaugei (Korshunova, Martynov, Bakken, Evertsen, Fletcher, Mudianta, Saito, Lundin, Schrödl & Picton, 2017): synonym of Fjordia chriskaugei
- Coryphella cooperi Cockerell, 1901: synonym of Orienthella cooperi
- Coryphella cynara Ev. Marcus & Er. Marcus, 1967: synonym of Kynaria cynara
- Coryphella dushia Ev. Marcus & Er. Marcus, 1963: synonym of Flabellina dushia
- Coryphella falklandica Eliot, 1907: synonym of Itaxia falklandica
- Coryphella fisheri MacFarland, 1966: synonym of accepted as Orienthella trilineata (O'Donoghue, 1921)
- Coryphella fogata Millen & Hermosillo, 2007: synonym of Orienthella fogata
- Coryphella fusca O'Donoghue, 1921: synonym of Himatina trophina Bergh, 1890
- Coryphella gracilis Alder & Hancock, 1844: synonym of Microchlamylla gracilis
- [Coryphella insolita García-Gómez & Cervera, 1989: synonym of Fjordia insolita
- Coryphella islandica Odhner, 1937: synonym of Paracoryphella islandica
- Coryphella japonica Volodchenko, 1941: synonym of Ziminella japonica
- Coryphella laevidens Knipowitsch, 1902: synonym of Ziminella salmonacea Couthouy, 1838
- Coryphella lineata (Lovén, 1846): synonym of Fjordia lineata Lovén, 1846
- Coryphella mananensis W. Stimpson, 1853: synonym of Coryphella verrucosa M. Sars, 1829
- Coryphella monicae Korshunova, Martynov, Bakken, Evertsen, Fletcher, Mudianta, Saito, Lundin, Schrödl & Picton, 2017: synonym of Gulenia monicae
- Coryphella nobilis A. E. Verrill, 1880: synonym of Borealea nobilis
- Coryphella orjani Korshunova, Martynov, Bakken, Evertsen, Fletcher, Mudianta, Saito, Lundin, Schrödl & Picton, 2017: synonym of Gulenia orjani
- Coryphella ornata Risbec, 1928: synonym of Samla bicolor Kelaart, 1858
- Coryphella parva M. Hadfield, 1963: synonym of Paracoryphella parva
- Coryphella pedata Montagu, 1816: synonym of Edmundsella pedata
- Coryphella pellucida Alder & Hancock, 1843: synonym of Carronella pellucida
- Coryphella piunca Er. Marcus, 1981: synonym of Orienthella trilineata O'Donoghue, 1921
- Coryphella polaris Volodchenko, 1946: synonym of Polaria polaris
- Coryphella pricei MacFarland, 1966: synonym of Apata pricei
- Coryphella robusta Trinchese, 1874: synonym of Coryphella verrucosa M. Sars, 1829
- Coryphella rufibranchialis G. Johnston, 1832: synonym of Coryphella verrucosa M. Sars, 1829
- Coryphella rutila Verrill, 1879: synonym of Carronella pellucida Alder & Hancock, 1843
- [Coryphella salmonacea Couthouy, 1838: synonym of Ziminella salmonacea
- Coryphella sanamyanae (Korshunova, Martynov, Bakken, Evertsen, Fletcher, Mudianta, Saito, Lundin, Schrödl & Picton, 2017): synonym of Borealea sanamyanae
- Coryphella sarsi Friele, 1903: synonym of Borealea nobilis A. E. Verrill, 1880
- Coryphella stimpsoni A. E. Verrill, 1879: synonym of Ziminella salmonacea Couthouy, 1838
- Coryphella trilineata O'Donoghue, 1921: synonym of Orienthella trilineata
- Coryphella trophina Bergh, 1890: synonym of Himatina trophina
- Coryphella verta Ev. Marcus, 1970: synonym of Orienthella verta
