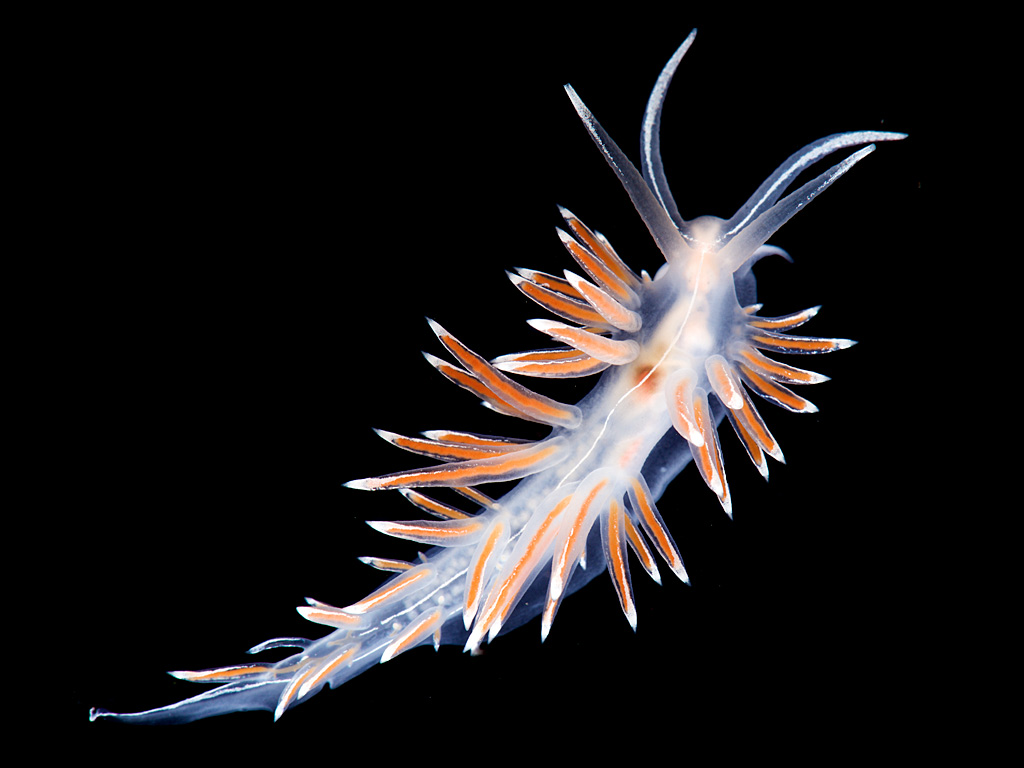
- Fjordia lineata

Scientific classification
- Kingdom: Animalia
- Phylum: Mollusca
- Class: Gastropoda
- Order: Nudibranchia
- Suborder: Aeolidacea
- Family: Coryphellidae
- Genus: Fjordia; Korshunova, Martynov, Bakken, Evertsen, Fletcher, Mudianta, Saito, Lundin, Schrödl & Picton, 2017

Type species
- Aeolis lineata Lovén, 1846

= Fjordia =

Genus of gastropods

Fjordia is a genus of sea slugs, specifically aeolid nudibranchs, marine gastropod molluscs in the family Coryphellidae.

Species within the genus Fjordia are as follows:

- Fjordia browni (Picton, 1980)
- Fjordia capensis (Thiele, 1925)
- Fjordia chriskaugei Korshunova, Martynov, Bakken, Evertsen, Fletcher, Mudianta, Saito, Lundin, Schrödl & Picton, 2017
- Fjordia insolita (Garcia-Gomez & Cervera, 1989)
- Fjordia lineata (Lovén, 1846)
