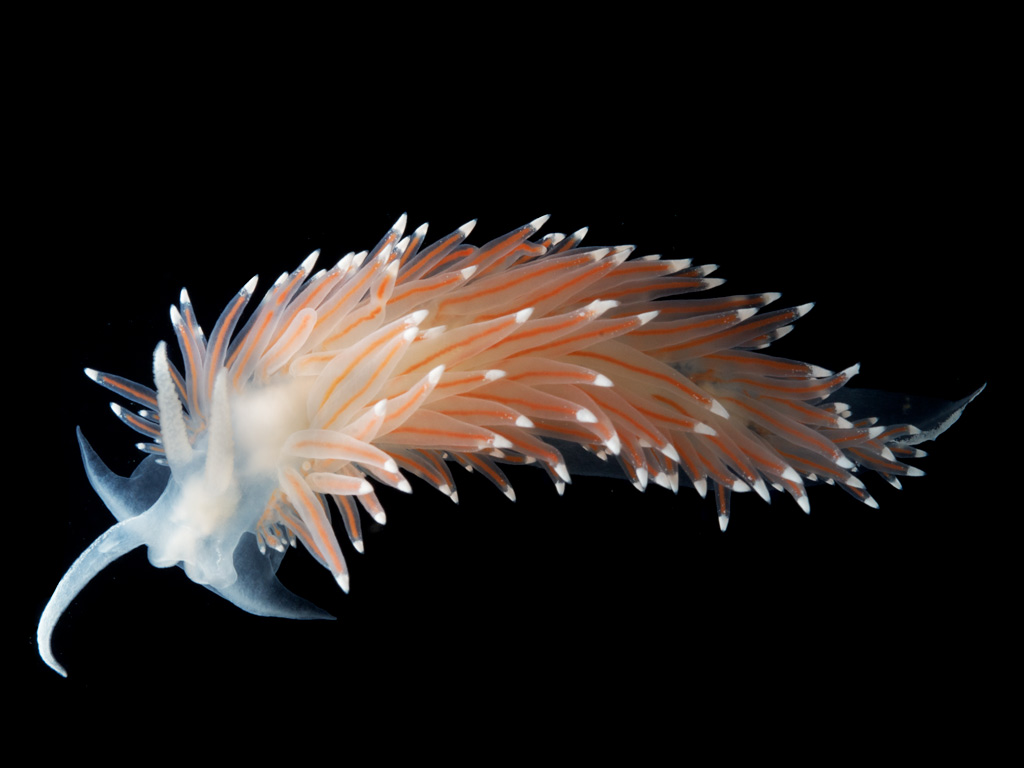
- Borealea nobilis

Scientific classification
- Kingdom: Animalia
- Phylum: Mollusca
- Class: Gastropoda
- Order: Nudibranchia
- Suborder: Aeolidacea
- Family: Coryphellidae
- Genus: Borealea; Korshunova, Martynov, Bakken, Evertsen, Fletcher, Mudianta, Saito, Lundin, Schrödl & Picton, 2017

Type species
- Coryphella nobilis A. E. Verrill, 1880

Synonyms
- Borealia Korshunova, Martynov, Bakken, Evertsen, Fletcher, Mudianta, Saito, Lundin, Schrödl & Picton, 2017 (homonym of Borealia Maksimova, 1977 [Trilobita])

= Borealea =

Genus of gastropods

Borealea is a genus of sea slugs, specifically aeolid nudibranchs, marine gastropod molluscs in the family Coryphellidae.

== Species ==
Species within the genus Borealea are as follows:

- Borealea nobilis (A. E. Verrill, 1880)
- Borealea sanamyanae Korshunova, Martynov, Bakken, Evertsen, Fletcher, Mudianta, Saito, Lundin, Schrödl & Picton, 2017
