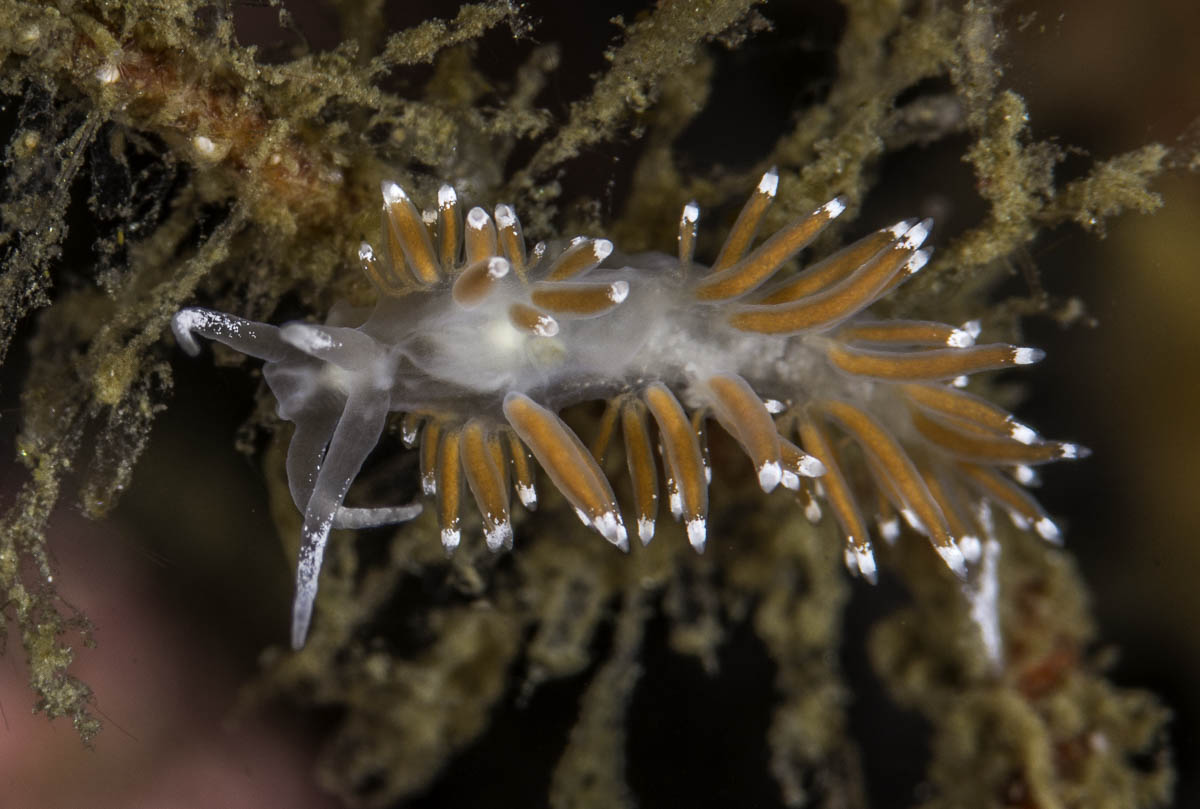
- Microchlamylla gracilis

Scientific classification
- Kingdom: Animalia
- Phylum: Mollusca
- Class: Gastropoda
- Order: Nudibranchia
- Suborder: Aeolidacea
- Family: Coryphellidae
- Genus: Microchlamylla; Korshunova, Martynov, Bakken, Evertsen, Fletcher, Mudianta, Saito, Lundin, Schrödl & Picton, 2017

Type species
- Eolis gracilis Alder & Hancock, 1844

= Microchlamylla =

Genus of gastropods

Microchlamylla is a genus of sea slugs, specifically aeolid nudibranchs, marine gastropod molluscs in the family Coryphellidae.

Species within the genus Microchlamylla are as follows:

- Microchlamylla amabilis (Hirano & Kuzirian, 1991)
- Microchlamylla gracilis (Alder & Hancock, 1844)
