= Coryphella trilineata =

Scientific classification
- Kingdom: Animalia
- Phylum: Mollusca
- Class: Gastropoda
- Order: Nudibranchia
- Suborder: Aeolidacea
- Family: Coryphellidae
- Genus: Orienthella
- Species: O. trilineata

Binomial name
- Orienthella trilineata (O'Donoghue, 1921)

Synonyms
- List: Coryphella fisheri MacFarland, 1966; Coryphella piunca Er. Marcus, 1961; Coryphella trilineata O'Donoghue, 1921; Flabellina fisheri (MacFarland, 1966); Flabellina piunca (Er. Marcus, 1961); Flabellina trilineata (O'Donoghue, 1921); Orientella trilineata (O'Donoghue, 1921)

Species of gastropod

Orienthella trilineata, also called the three-lined aeolid, is a species of aeolid nudibranch in the family Coryphellidae. It is considered common in California, but is also found between southern Canada and northern Mexico.

== Taxonomy ==
Orienthella trilineata was originally described as Coryphella trilineata in 1921 by Charles Henry O'Donoghue from a single specimen captured in Nanoose Bay, British Columbia. Though its name is currently the same as its original description, it has also been referred to by several synonyms. To complicate things, several presumed species were later believed to be synonymous with this taxon, including Coryphella piunca in 1961 and Coryphella fisheri in 1966. Since then, O. trilineata has been re-examined and redefined; specimens with annulate rhinophores with white colouration remaining in O. trilineata, and all specimens bearing annulate rhinophores with orange tips moving into the sister species Orienthella piunca.

== Description ==
Orienthella trilineata can reach lengths of between 5–20 mm (0.20–0.79 in), with a maximum length of 35 mm (1.4 in). They possess between 32–34 conical cerata. All cerata are found behind the rhinophores, and may be between 1–2 mm (0.039–0.079 in) in length. The rhinophores do not contract, and have blunt ends. The genital pore is located on the right side of the body, towards the head.

This species is quite similar to Coryphella verrucosa, Coryphella lineata, and Pacifia goddardi, but can be distinguished by possessing perfoliate rhinophores, a distinct radula, and 3 lateral stripes.

It can be simply distinguished from the other very similar looking members of its genus by having rhinophores with annulations, not smooth or irregular, and bearing only white pigment on the oral tentacles and rhinophores without a trace of orange.

=== Radula ===
The radula is yellow in coloration, and possesses between 24–26 rows of teeth, with 3 teeth per row. The central median tooth is U-shaped with a spine in the center. 6 spines surround the median tooth on each side, and are distinctly more robust than those found in Coryphella verrucosa. The lateral teeth are shaped like right triangles, with the hypotenuse bearing 1 large spine plus 8–10 smaller spines.

=== Coloration ===
One of the most distinguishing characteristics of this species is its stripes. O. trilineata possesses three white lines on the back and sides. The line down the middle of the back passes between the rhinophores where it splits and continues to the tips of the oral tentacles. The body is white or grey, and the cerata are transparent with red interiors.

== Distribution ==
Orienthella trilineata is found in the intertidal zone along the Eastern Pacific coast. It can be found as far north as Vancouver Island and as far south as the Coronado Islands. Specific occurrences have been reported at Dillon Beach, Point Pinos, Monterey Bay, near Waddell Creek, and Point Cabrillo. It may live on hydroids, eelgrass, or macroalgae. It may also be found as deep as 27 m (89 ft).

== Ecology ==
Orienthella trilineata feeds on hydroids, including those in the order Leptothecata, as well as Tubularia spp., Eudendrium californicum, and Ectopleura crocea.

The amphipod Podocerus cristatus is thought to mimic this species (among others) based on its very similar coloration. It is hypothesized that this is an example of Batesian mimicry, as O. trilineata is known to possess cnidosacs that discourage predators.

== Reproduction and development ==
Like other nudibranchs, Orienthella trilineata lays eggs in a twisting mass called a ribbon. This species in particular lays white eggs with about 600–700 individual capsules for every 2 mm (0.079 in) of ribbon. Each capsule may contain between 1–2 individual embryos. The ribbon is very thin, and is anchored to a substrate (such as the blades of Zostera marina).

Once the egg mass is laid, the embryos begin development immediately. Within about 54 hours at 16 °C (61 °F), the embryos will have reached the gastrula stage. Within the next day, they have become trochophore larvae, complete with cilia and statocysts. Before they hatch, they will also develop the foot and shell-secreting glands. Once the shell starts to develop, the embryos will have reached the veliger larval stage, and they will hatch from the egg ribbon.

When the eggs eventually hatch, the resulting larvae have long cilia, which they use to both swim around and capture phytoplankton to eat. The coiled larval shell is around 0.1 mm in length, and eyespots are not present.
