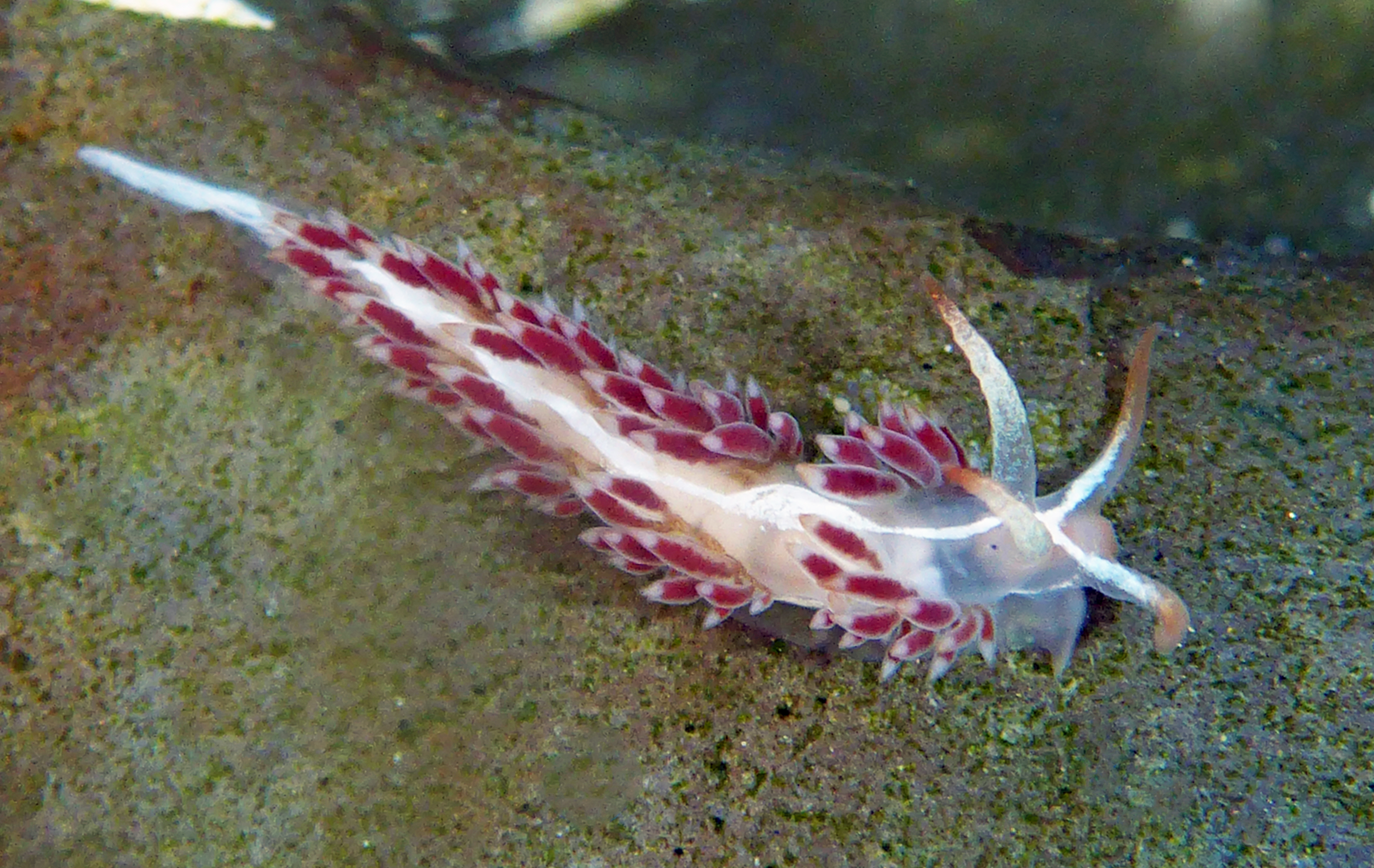
- Orienthella cooperi

Scientific classification
- Kingdom: Animalia
- Phylum: Mollusca
- Class: Gastropoda
- Order: Nudibranchia
- Suborder: Aeolidacea
- Family: Coryphellidae
- Genus: Orienthella; Korshunova, Martynov, Bakken, Evertsen, Fletcher, Mudianta, Saito, Lundin, Schrödl & Picton, 2017

Type species
- Coryphella trilineata O'Donoghue, 1921

Species
- See text

Synonyms
- Orientella Korshunova et al., 2017a (junior homonym)

= Orienthella =

Genus of gastropods

Orienthella is a genus of sea slugs, specifically aeolid nudibranchs, marine gastropod molluscs in the family Coryphellidae.

== Species ==
Species within the genus Orienthella are as follows:

- Orienthella fogata (Millen & Hermosillo, 2007)
- Orienthella piunca (Marcus, Er., 1961)
- Orienthella trilineata (O'Donoghue, 1921)
- Orienthella verta (Marcus, Ev. 1970)
