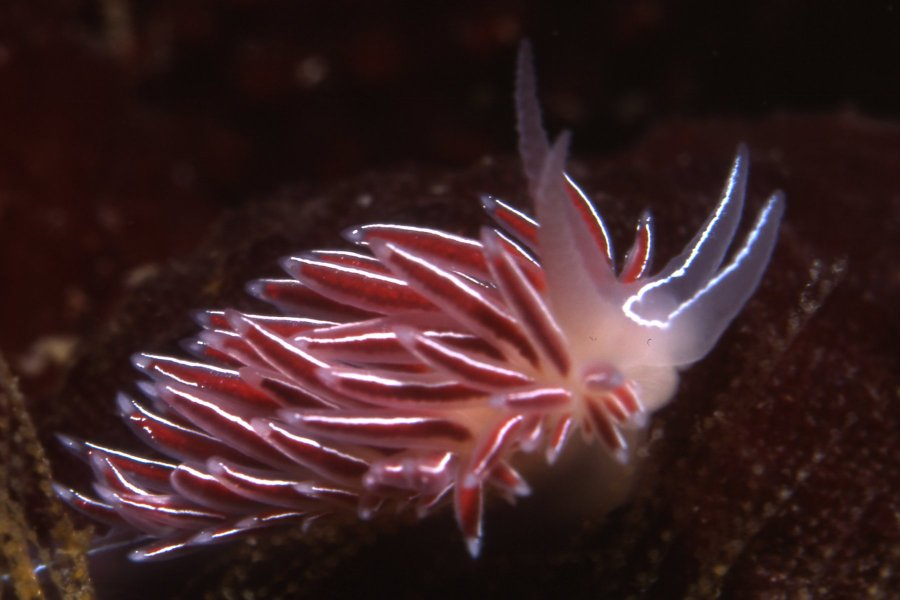

Scientific classification
- Kingdom: Animalia
- Phylum: Mollusca
- Class: Gastropoda
- Order: Nudibranchia
- Suborder: Aeolidacea
- Family: Coryphellidae
- Genus: Fjordia
- Species: F. capensis

Binomial name
- Fjordia capensis (Thiele, 1925)

Synonyms
- Coryphella capensis (Thiele, 1925); Flabellina capensis (Thiele, 1925)

= Fjordia capensis =

White-edged nudibranch Fjordia capensis

Species of gastropod

The white-edged nudibranch, Fjordia capensis is a species of sea slug, specifically an aeolid nudibranch, a colourful sea slug. It is a marine gastropod mollusc in the family Coryphellidae.

== Distribution ==
This species is endemic to the South African coast and is found only from the Atlantic coast of the Cape Peninsula to Port Elizabeth in 10–30 m of water.

== Description ==
The white-edged nudibranch is a slender pale-bodied aeolid with numerous dark red cerata all edged with white. It is usually smaller than 40mm. It has rugose pale rhinophores. It has a pair of elongated oral tentacles having an opaque white stripe.

Visually, it can be easily confused with Coryphella lineata and Coryphella chriskaugei, but neither of these species occur in southern Africa. In the event geographical data isn’t available, C. capensis differs from C. lineata by having translucent cnidosacs that might only have a dot or two of white pigment from the ceratal stripes. While the cnidosacs of C. lineata are also mainly translucent, they are commonly partially obscured by white pigment that strongly connects to the ceratal stripes, on occasions fully obscured. C. capensis differs from C. chriskaugei by having generally far more continuous ceratal stripes, and white pigment capable of appearing on the cnidosac; C. chriskaugei ceratal markings always stop short of the cnidosac, and are far more erratic and composed of dashes and dots.

== Ecology ==
This aeolid feeds on hydroids of the genus Eudendrium. In common with other aeolid nudibranchs, the cerata of white-edged nudibranch aid in respiration but also contain extensions of the digestive system. The white-edged nudibranch eats the hydroid and passes its nematocysts unharmed through its digestive system to the tips of its cerata. Here the nematocysts mature and are then used by the nudibranch for its own defence. It is probable that the bright colours of the white-edged nudibranch serve to advertise to predators that it is toxic.

The white-edged nudibranch is hermaphrodite. The egg mass is highly convoluted and creamy white.
