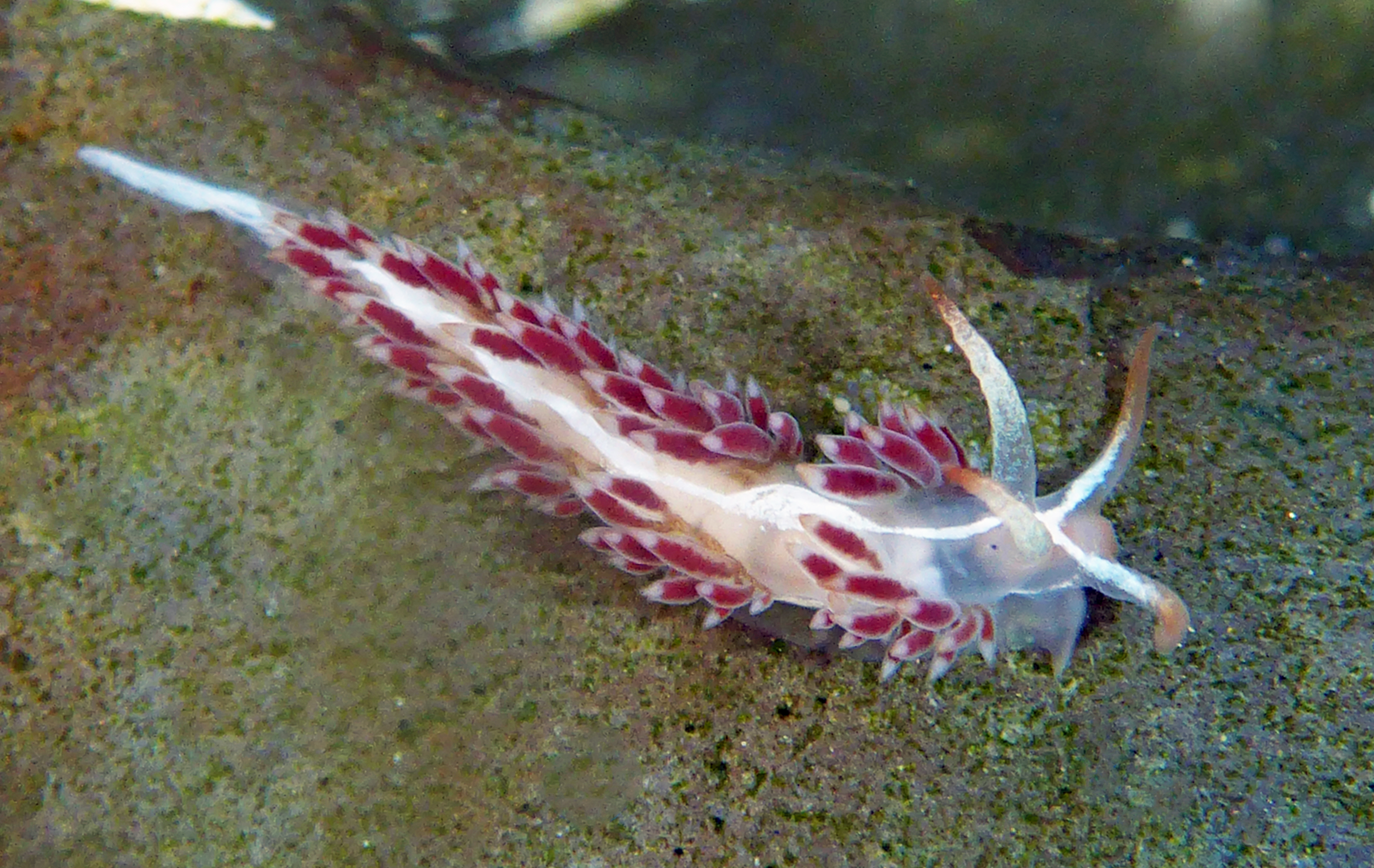
- Coryphella cooperi from Fitzgerald Marine Reserve, California

Scientific classification
- Kingdom: Animalia
- Phylum: Mollusca
- Class: Gastropoda
- Order: Nudibranchia
- Suborder: Aeolidacea
- Family: Coryphellidae
- Genus: Coryphella
- Species: C. cooperi

Binomial name
- Coryphella cooperi (Cockerell, 1901)

Synonyms
- Flabellina cooperi (Cockerell, 1901); Orienthella cooperi (Cockerell, 1901)

= Coryphella cooperi =

Species of gastropod

Coryphella cooperi is a species of sea slug, an aeolid nudibranch, a marine gastropod mollusc in the family Coryphellidae.

== Description ==
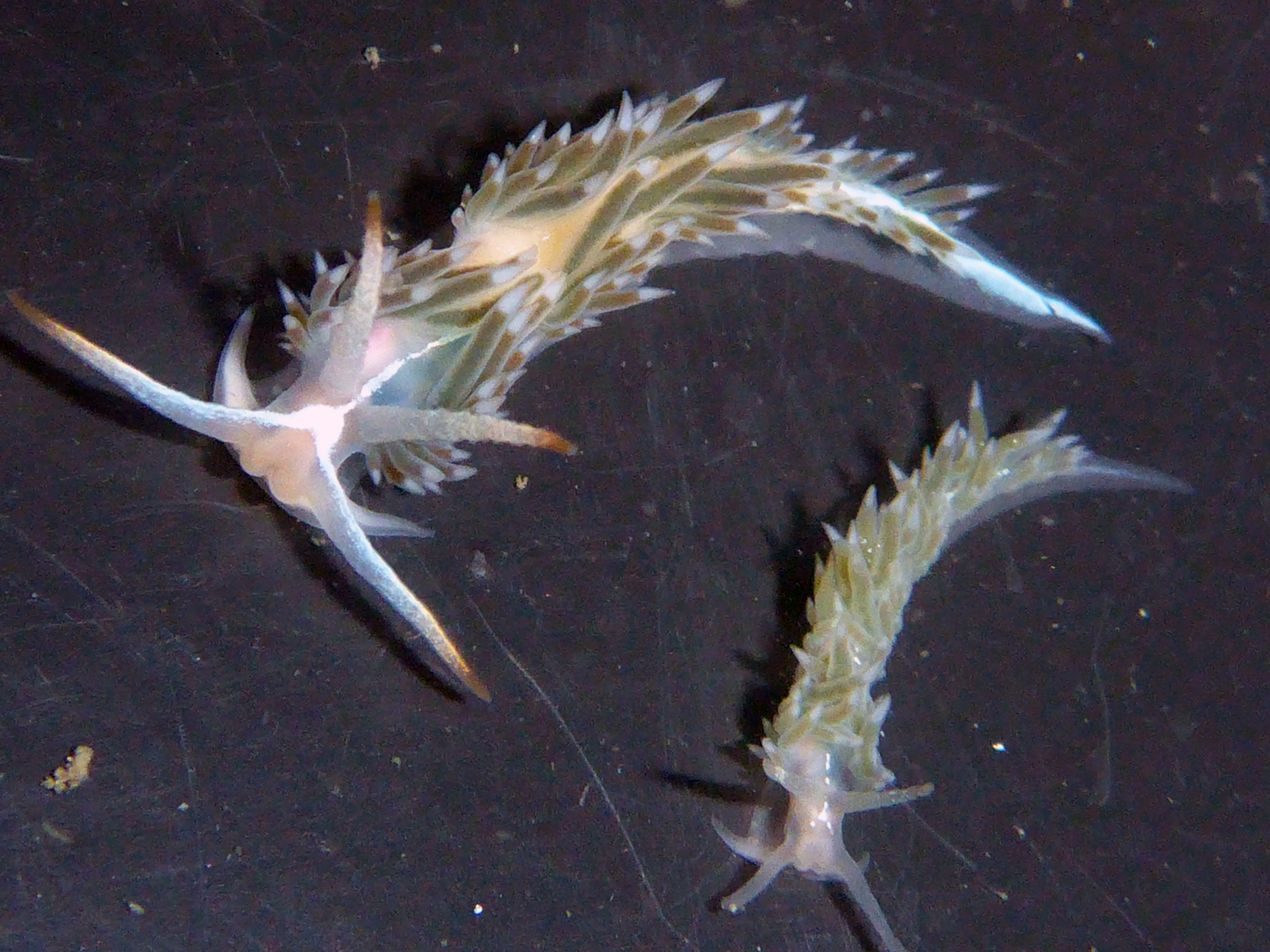
Coryphella cooperi - adult and juvenile - from Santa Cruz, California

Coryphella cooperi has a translucent white body with a stripe of white surface pigment along the middle of the back. This line forks in front of the rhinophores and may continue onto the oral tentacles. There are small white pigment spots on the outer part of the oral tentacles and rhinophores. The cerata contain green digestive gland and have a sprinkling of white spots in the outer part, below the cnidosacs.
