= Coryphella abei =

Scientific classification
- Kingdom: Animalia
- Phylum: Mollusca
- Class: Gastropoda
- Order: Nudibranchia
- Suborder: Aeolidacea
- Family: Flabellinidae
- Genus: Coryphella
- Species: C. abei

Binomial name
- Coryphella abei Baba, 1987

Synonyms
- Flabellina abei (Baba, 1987)

Species of gastropod

Coryphella abei is a species of sea slug, an aeolid nudibranch, a marine gastropod mollusc in the family Flabellinidae.

Both Ekimova et al. (2026) and Korshunova et al. (2025) consider its placement within Coryphella as only provisional, believing further study is needed to confirm or otherwise clarify its placement.

== Distribution ==
This species was originally described near Toyama Bay, Japan in the Sea of Japan.
