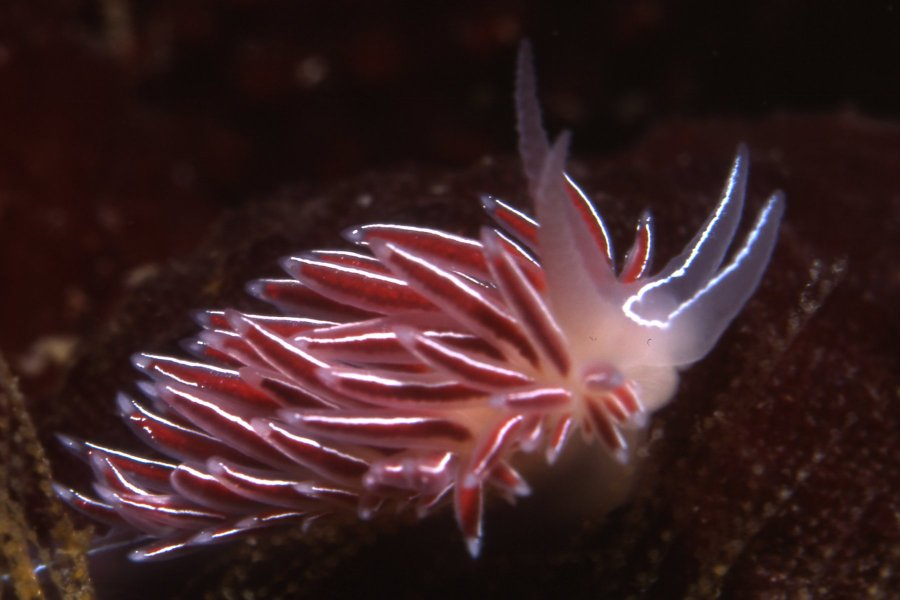
- Fjordia capensis

Scientific classification
- Kingdom: Animalia
- Phylum: Mollusca
- Class: Gastropoda
- Order: Nudibranchia
- Suborder: Aeolidacea
- Superfamily: Flabellinoidea; Bergh, 1889

Families
- See Families

= Flabellinoidea =

Superfamily of gastropods

Flabellinoidea is a superfamily of nudibranchs, shell-less marine gastropod molluscs or sea slugs, in the suborder Aeolidacea.

== Families ==
According to Korshunova and colleagues (2025), the following genera are recognised in the superfamily Flabellinoidea:

- Family Coryphellidae Bergh, 1889
- Family Flabellinidae Bergh, 1889
- Family Paracoryphellidae Miller, 1971

Ekimova et al. (2026) considers Coryphellidae and Paracoryphellidae to be synonyms of Flabellinidae.
