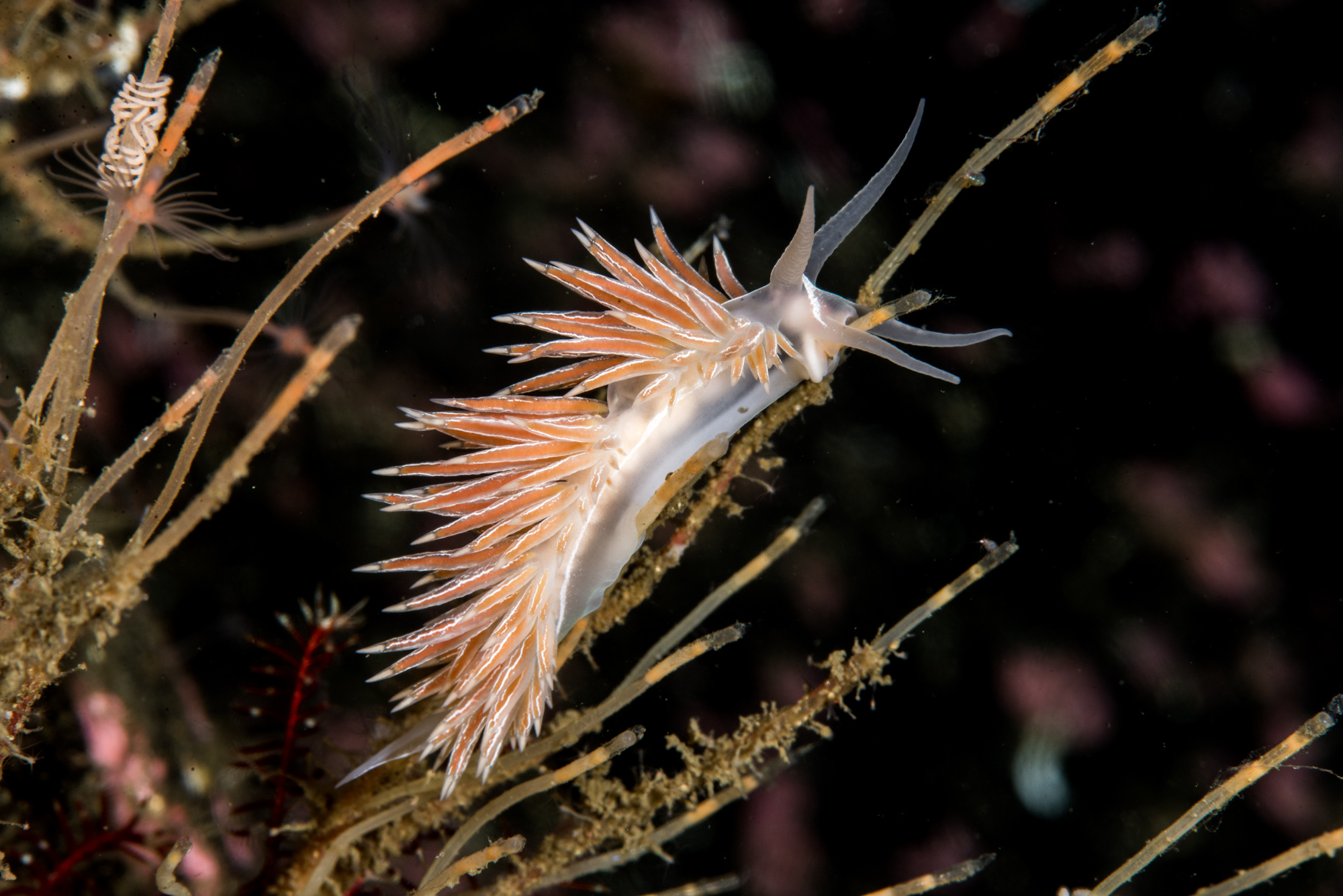
- The nudibranch Fjordia chriskaugei, Gulen Dive Resort, Norway

Scientific classification
- Kingdom: Animalia
- Phylum: Mollusca
- Class: Gastropoda
- Order: Nudibranchia
- Suborder: Aeolidacea
- Family: Coryphellidae
- Genus: Fjordia
- Species: F. chriskaugei

Binomial name
- Fjordia chriskaugei (Korshunova, Martynov, Bakken, Evertsen, Fletcher, Mudianta, Saito, Lundin, Schrödl & Picton), 2017

Synonyms
- Coryphella chriskaugei Korshunova, Martynov, Bakken, Evertsen, Fletcher, Mudianta, H. Saito, Lundin, Schrödl & Picton, 2017

= Fjordia chriskaugei =

Species of gastropod

Fjordia chriskaugei is a species of sea slug, an aeolid nudibranch, a marine heterobranch mollusc in the family Coryphellidae.

== Description ==
Fjordia chriskaugei are commonly 30-50mm in length and are seen in a variety of colours, translucent white with either red, red-brown, yellow, or orange colouring of the digestive gland within the cerata.

== Diet ==
This species feeds on hydroids such as Tubularia indivisa.

== Distribution ==
Fjordia chriskaugei was described from Gulen Dive Resort at the entrance to the Sognefjord, Norway, 60.9567°N 5.1293°E. It can be found throughout the British Isles, and can also be found north to Norway, along the Atlantic coasts of France and in the Mediterranean Sea.
