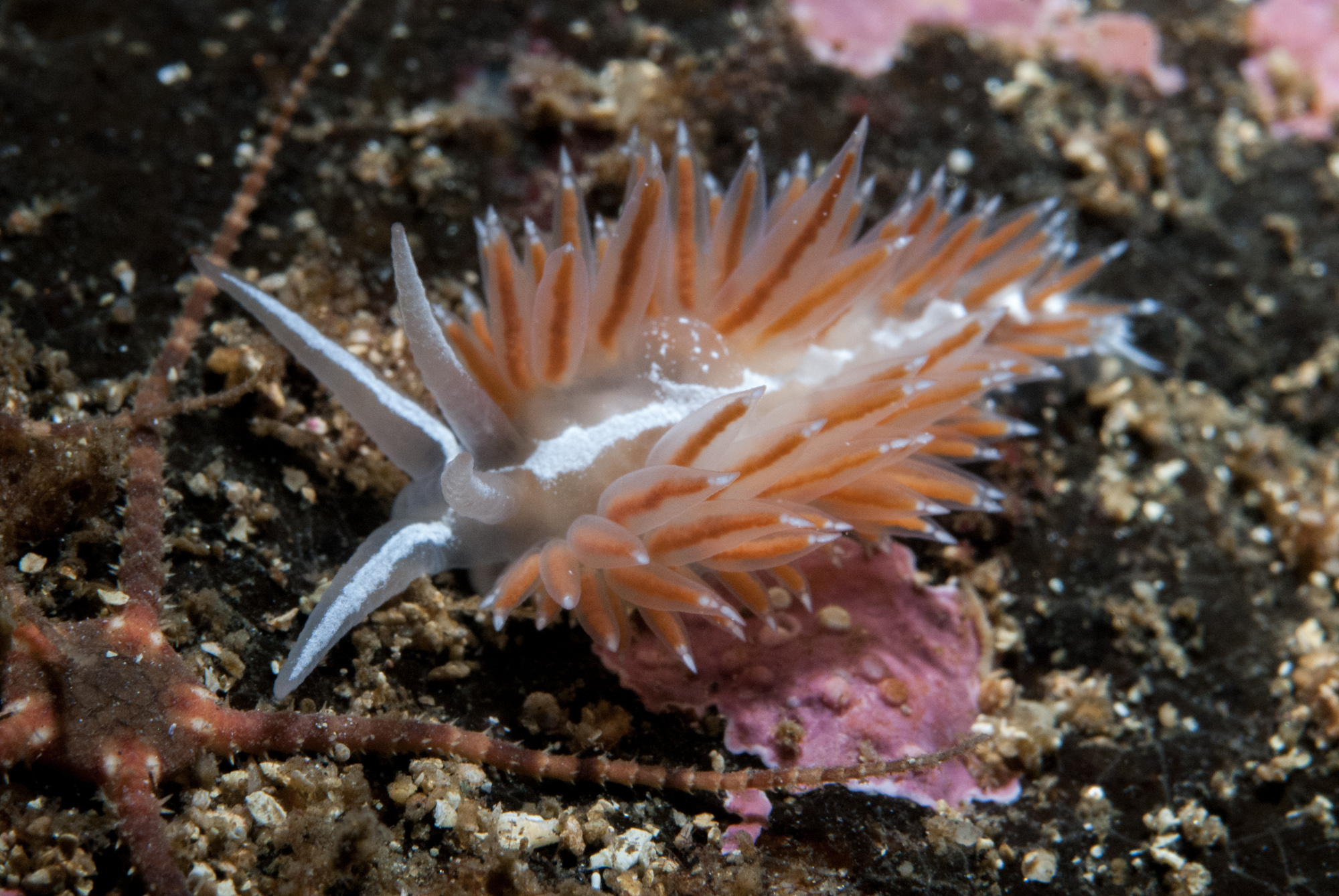
- The nudibranch, Gulenia orjani, Gulen Dive Resort, Norway.

Scientific classification
- Kingdom: Animalia
- Phylum: Mollusca
- Class: Gastropoda
- Order: Nudibranchia
- Suborder: Aeolidacea
- Family: Coryphellidae
- Genus: Gulenia
- Species: G. orjani

Binomial name
- Gulenia orjani (Korshunova, Martynov, Bakken, Evertsen, Fletcher, Mudianta, Saito, Lundin, Schrödl & Picton, 2017)

Synonyms
- Coryphella orjani Korshunova, Martynov, Bakken, Evertsen, Fletcher, Mudianta, Saito, Lundin, Schrödl & Picton, 2017

= Gulenia orjani =

Species of gastropod

Gulenia orjani is a species of sea slug, an aeolid nudibranch, a marine heterobranch mollusc in the family Coryphellidae.

== Distribution ==
Gulenia orjani was described from specimens collected at 10–30 m depth at Gulen Dive Centre, Norway, Atlantic Ocean, 60.9578°N 5.1284°E.
