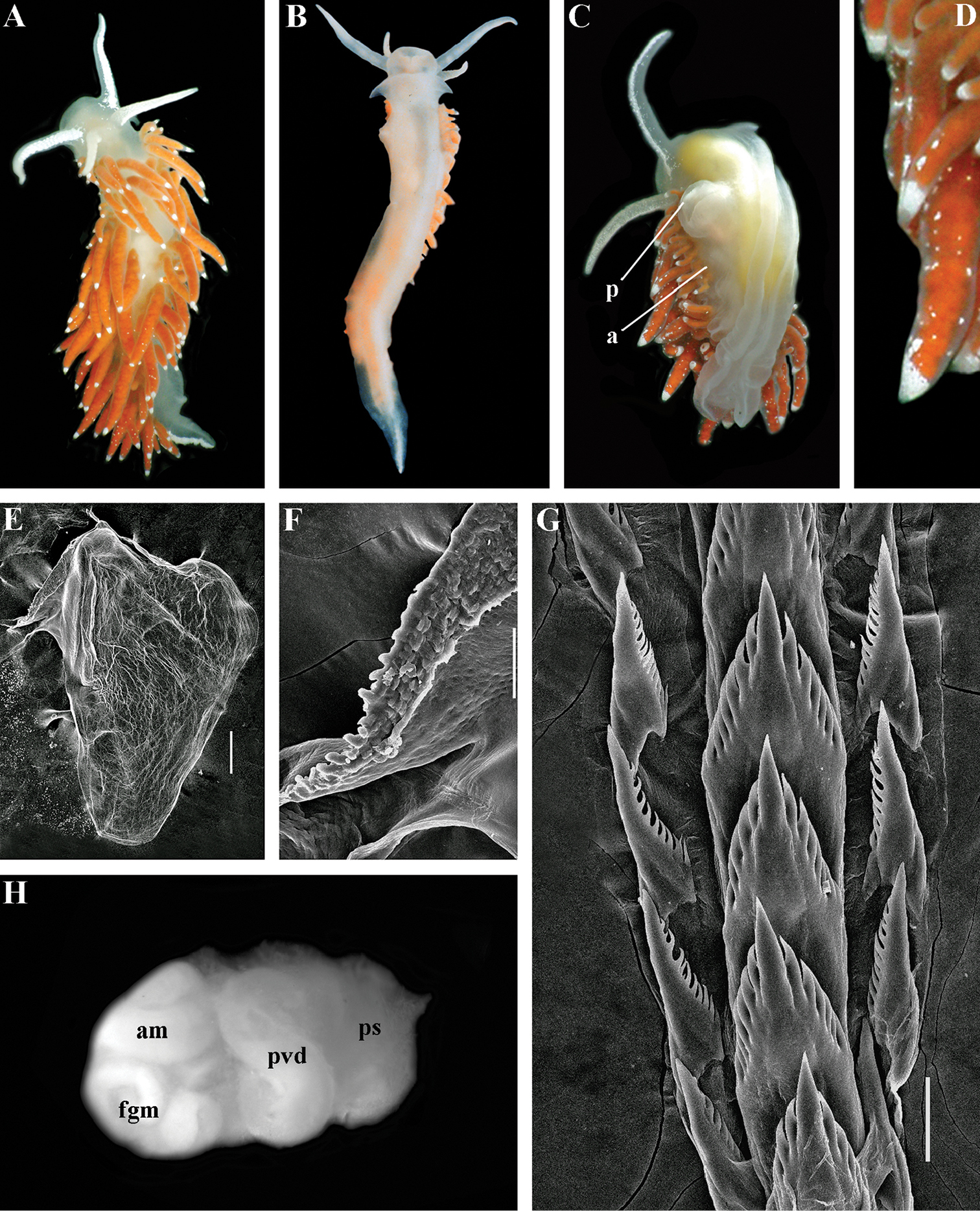
- Coryphella pseudoverrucosa

Scientific classification
- Kingdom: Animalia
- Phylum: Mollusca
- Class: Gastropoda
- Order: Nudibranchia
- Suborder: Aeolidacea
- Family: Flabellinidae
- Genus: Coryphella
- Species: C. pseudoverrucosa

Binomial name
- Coryphella pseudoverrucosa Martynov, Sanamyan & Korshunova, 2015

Synonyms
- Flabellina pseudoverrucosa (Martynov, Sanamyan & Korshunova, 2015)

= Coryphella pseudoverrucosa =

Species of gastropod

Coryphella pseudoverrucosa is a species of sea slug, an aeolid nudibranch, a marine gastropod mollusc in the family Flabellinidae.

== Taxonomic status ==
Previously Coryphella pseudoverrucosa has been regarded as a synonym of Coryphella verrucosa, but was reinstated as its own taxon along with Coryphella longicaudata in Korshunova et al. (2025) as a result of morphological, phylogeographical, and molecular-phylogenetic analysis. In particular, the study corrected previously confused and mishandled data published in Ekimova et al. (2022) that had resulted in the erroneous synonymy, along with pointing out Ekimova et al.'s inconsistent diagnostic parameters that contradicted its own conclusions, and the evidence of datasets being copy-and-pasted without verification leading to unfounded results. Corrected material was provided in Korshunova et al.'s publication, along with extensive analysis in support of the distinction between taxa.

== Distribution ==
C. pseudoverrucosa can be found in the northwest Pacific Ocean, occurrences recorded from the Sea of Japan, the Kuril Islands, and Kamchatka. This range overlaps with the Western range of Coryphella longicaudata, both occurring in the Kuril Islands and Kamchatka. It is distinct from Coryphella verrucosa, which only exists in Atlantic waters.
