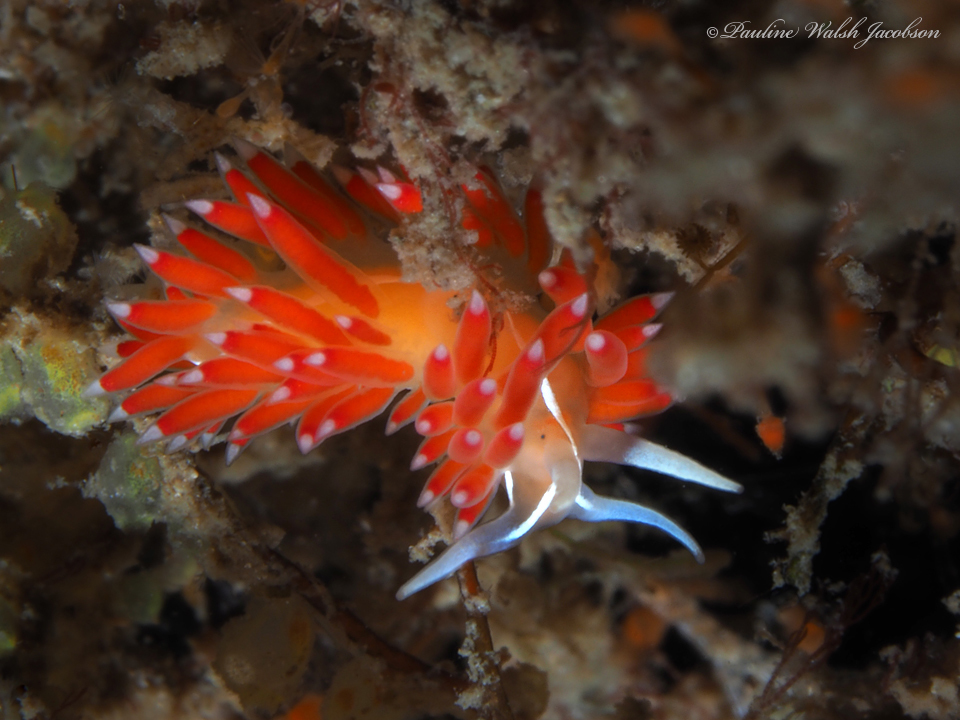

Scientific classification
- Kingdom: Animalia
- Phylum: Mollusca
- Class: Gastropoda
- Order: Nudibranchia
- Suborder: Aeolidacea
- Family: Coryphellidae
- Genus: Orienthella
- Species: O. verta

Binomial name
- Orienthella verta (Ev. Marcus, 1970)

Synonyms
- Coryphella verta Ev. Mardcus, 1970; Flabellina verta Ev. Mardcus, 1970

= Orienthella verta =

Species of gastropod

Orienthella verta is a species of sea slug, an aeolid nudibranch, a marine gastropod mollusc in the family Coryphellidae.

== Distribution ==
This species was described from Brazil. It has been reported from Florida.

== Description ==
The maximum recorded body length is 21 mm.

== Ecology ==
Minimum recorded depth is 1 m. Maximum recorded depth is 30 m.
