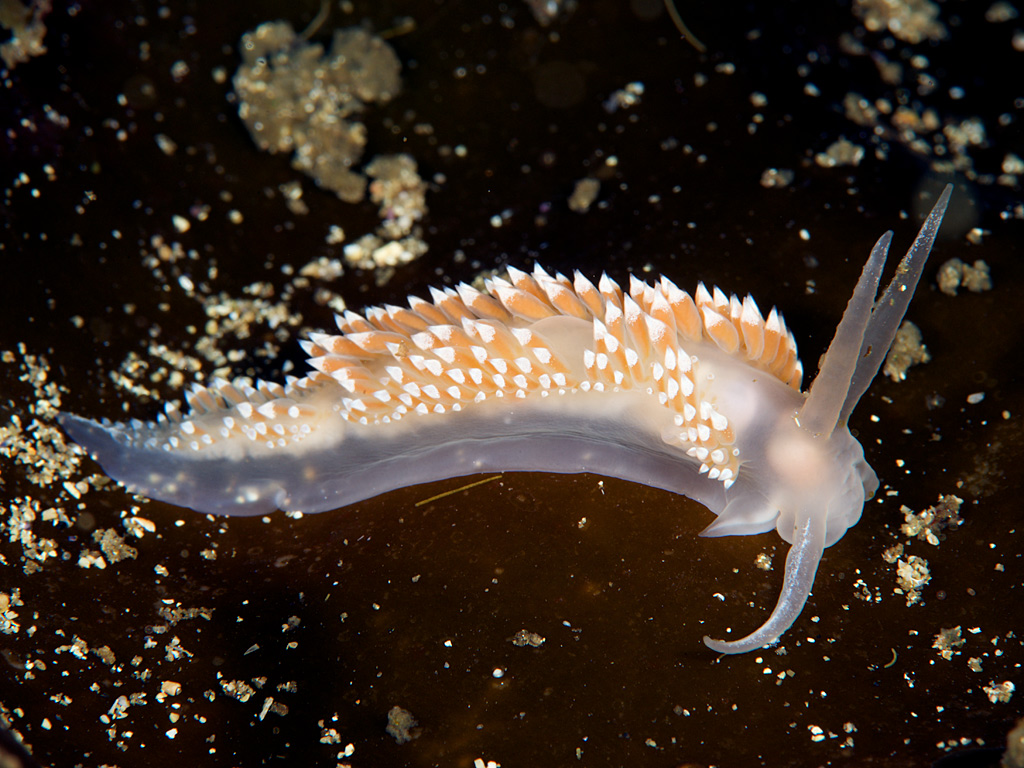
- Coryphella verrucosa from Gulen Dive Resort, Norway.

Scientific classification
- Kingdom: Animalia
- Phylum: Mollusca
- Class: Gastropoda
- Order: Nudibranchia
- Suborder: Aeolidacea
- Family: Flabellinidae
- Genus: Coryphella
- Species: C. verrucosa

Binomial name
- Coryphella verrucosa (M. Sars, 1829)

Synonyms
- List: Aeolidia verrucosa M. Sars, 1829 (incorrect subsequent spelling); Coryphella mananensis (Stimpson, 1853) (junior synonym); Coryphella robusta Trinchese, 1874; Coryphella rufibranchialis (G. Johnston, 1832); Coryphella rufibranchialis chocolata Balch, 1908 (junior synonym); Coryphella rufibranchialis mananensis (Stimpson, 1853); Coryphella rufibranchialis var. chocolata Balch, 1909; Eolidia embletoni G. Johnston, 1835; Eolidia verrucosa M. Sars, 1829; Eolis diversa Couthouy, 1839; Eolis mananensis Stimpson, 1853; Eolis rufibranchialis G. Johnston, 1832; Flabellina pseudoverrucosa (Martynov, Sanamyan & Korshunova, 2015)

= Coryphella verrucosa =

Species of gastropod

Coryphella verrucosa, is a species of sea slug, an aeolid nudibranch, a marine gastropod mollusc in the family Flabellinidae.

== Distribution ==
The type locality of Coryphella verrucosa is Bergen, Norway. Current thing it is widespread in the North Atlantic ocean, going as far North as the Barents Sea. In North America, its range includes the Gulf of St Lawrence and the Gulf of Maine.

Animals from British Columbia and Alaska differ significantly in colour pattern and are a sibling species, described as Coryphella longicaudata O'Donoghue, 1922. Coryphella pseudoverrucosa has recently been described as a separate species, living in the Northwest Pacific near the Sea of Japan, though it overlaps in range with C. longicaudata somewhat in the Kuril Islands.

== Description ==
The original description of this species is of an animal with unusually short, rounded cerata, hence the name verrucosa. The name has been extensively used for animals of different appearance, with long cerata, including Coryphella rufibranchialis, the type species of the genus Coryphella.

The body of Coryphella verrucosa is translucent white. The tail is elongated and pointed with a mid-dorsal line of opaque white pigment in which there are round translucent spots. This white line may extend along the back amongst the cerata from the tail, breaking up into spots. In different parts of its range this species has differently coloured forms, which may be different species. In some places the digestive gland in the cerata is red while in other locations, cerata with brown digestive gland predominate, though it is known that the colour of the digestive gland in species of Coryphellidae is dependent on diet. There is also considerable variation in the colouring of the tips of the cerata, from narrow broken rings (F. rufibranchialis form) through broad white bands to white almost covering the tips of the cerata in the typical form. The oral tentacles have a broad white stripe on the upper surfaces.

The maximum recorded body length is 35 mm or up to 40 mm (1.6 in).

This nudibranch is similar in appearance to Microchlamylla gracilis and many other species of Flabellinidae.

== Ecology ==
In Norway this is a common species in depths of 2–10 metres (6 ft 7 in – 32 ft 10 in). Minimum recorded depth is 0 m and maximum recorded depth is 183 m. Flabellina verrucosa sensu lato has been reported at depths down to about 300 metres (980 ft) and seems to inhabit both sandy and rocky habitats.

Coryphella verrucosa grazes on sessile invertebrates on the sea bed. It also feeds on detritus and plankton. In the United Kingdom, it lives almost exclusively on the oaten pipes hydroid (Tubularia indivisa) whilst the juveniles have a wider diet range.

Coryphella verrucosa is a hermaphrodite but self-fertilisation does not occur. Two adults engage in an elaborate touching ritual that was at first thought to be agonistic behaviour. The tentacles touch each other and are then withdrawn repeatedly and there is biting, lunging and sidling. The actual act of copulation is very quick. The eggs are laid in a gelatinous string neatly coiled in a spiral on the seabed. After hatching, the veliger larvae drift as part of the plankton, eventually settling on the seabed.

As in most other Aeolid nudibranchs Coryphella verrucosa has the ability to incorporate nematocysts from its prey into the tissue of its cerata as a defence. It was found experimentally that when the nudibranch was kept in the vicinity of certain predators such as the common sunstar (Crossaster papposus), the bergall (Tautogolabrus adspersus) (a fish) and the shore crab Carcinus maenas, it incorporated more nematocysts than it did in a predator-free environment.
