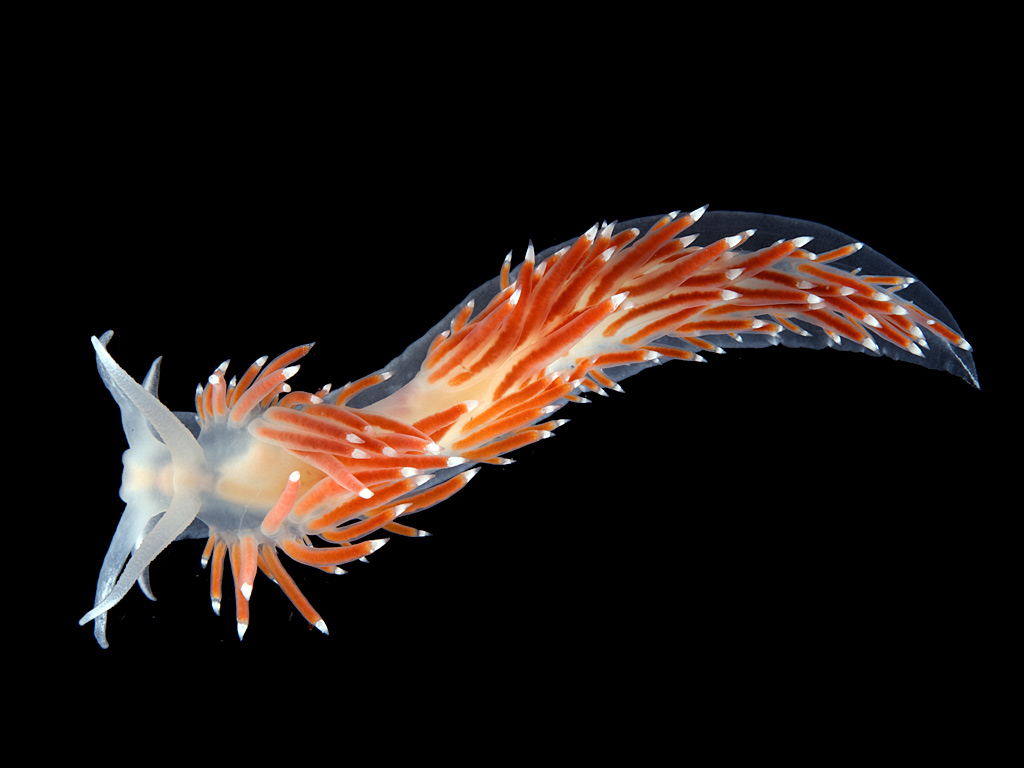
- The nudibranch Coryphella browni, Gulen Dive resort, Norway.

Scientific classification
- Kingdom: Animalia
- Phylum: Mollusca
- Class: Gastropoda
- Order: Nudibranchia
- Suborder: Aeolidacea
- Family: Flabellinidae
- Genus: Coryphella
- Species: C. browni

Binomial name
- Coryphella browni Picton, 1980

Synonyms
- Fjordia browni (Picton, 1980); Flabellina browni (Picton, 1980)

= Coryphella browni =

Species of gastropod

Coryphella browni is a species of sea slug, an aeolid nudibranch, a marine gastropod mollusc in the family Flabellinidae.

== Distribution ==
This species was described from Ireland. It is a fairly common species found in exposed sites from northern France to Norway.

== Description ==
This Coryphella has a narrow body and cerata in well defined clusters. The cerata have a broad band of white pigment at the tip.

== Ecology ==
The diet of this species is a hydroid, Tubularia indivisa.
