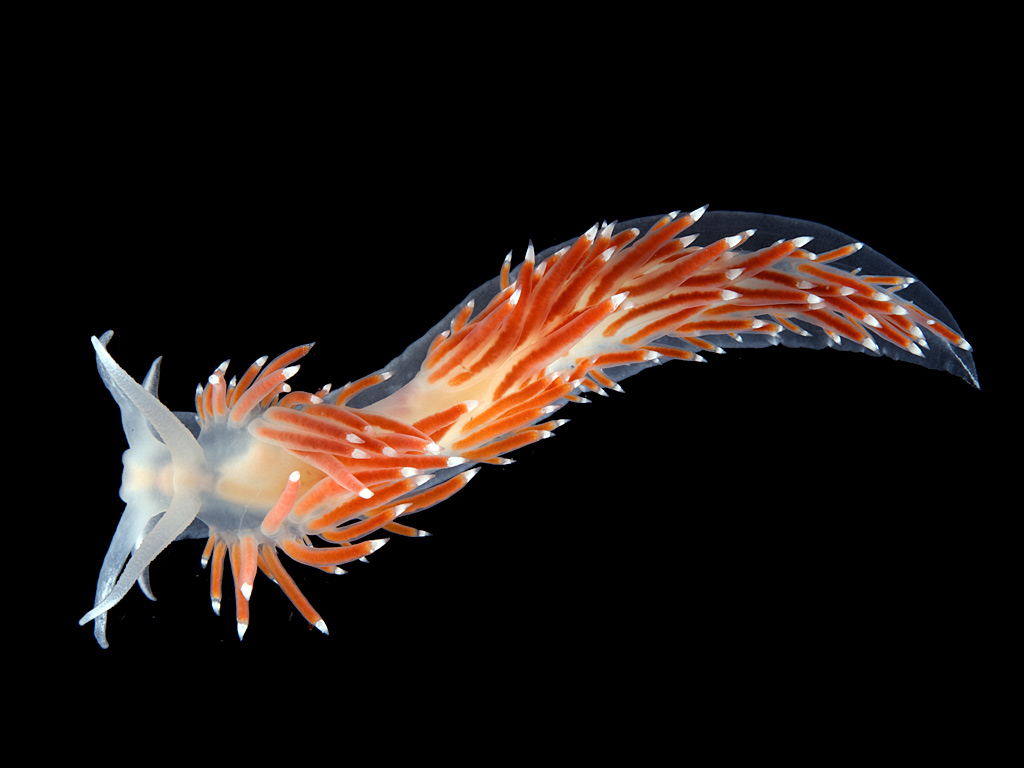
- Fjordia browni

Scientific classification
- Kingdom: Animalia
- Phylum: Mollusca
- Class: Gastropoda
- Order: Nudibranchia
- Suborder: Aeolidacea
- Superfamily: Flabellinoidea
- Family: Coryphellidae; Bergh, 1889

Type genus
- Coryphella J. E. Gray, 1850

Genera
- See Genera

= Coryphellidae =

Family of gastropods

Coryphellidae is a family of nudibranchs, shell-less marine gastropod molluscs or sea slugs, in the superfamily Flabellinoidea.

== Genera ==
As of 2026, genera within the family Coryphellidae include:

- Borealea Korshunova, Martynov, Bakken, Evertsen, Fletcher, Mudianta, Saito, Lundin, Schrödl & Picton, 2017
- Corrupta Korshunova, Fletcher & Martynov, 2025
- Coryphella J. E. Gray, 1850
- Fjordia Korshunova, Martynov, Bakken, Evertsen, Fletcher, Mudianta, Saito, Lundin, Schrödl & Picton, 2017
- Gulenia Korshunova, Martynov, Bakken, Evertsen, Fletcher, Mudianta, Saito, Lundin, Schrödl & Picton, 2017
- Himatina Thiele, 1931
- Itaxia Korshunova, Martynov, Bakken, Evertsen, Fletcher, Mudianta, Saito, Lundin, Schrödl & Picton, 2017
- Microchlamylla Korshunova, Martynov, Bakken, Evertsen, Fletcher, Mudianta, Saito, Lundin, Schrödl & Picton, 2017
- Occidenthella Korshunova, Martynov, Bakken, Evertsen, Fletcher, Mudianta, Saito, Lundin, Schrödl & Picton, 2017
- Orienthella Korshunova, Martynov, Bakken, Evertsen, Fletcher, Mudianta, Saito, Lundin, Schrödl & Picton, 2017
- Portorchardia Korshunova, Fletcher & Martynov, 2025

== Gallery ==
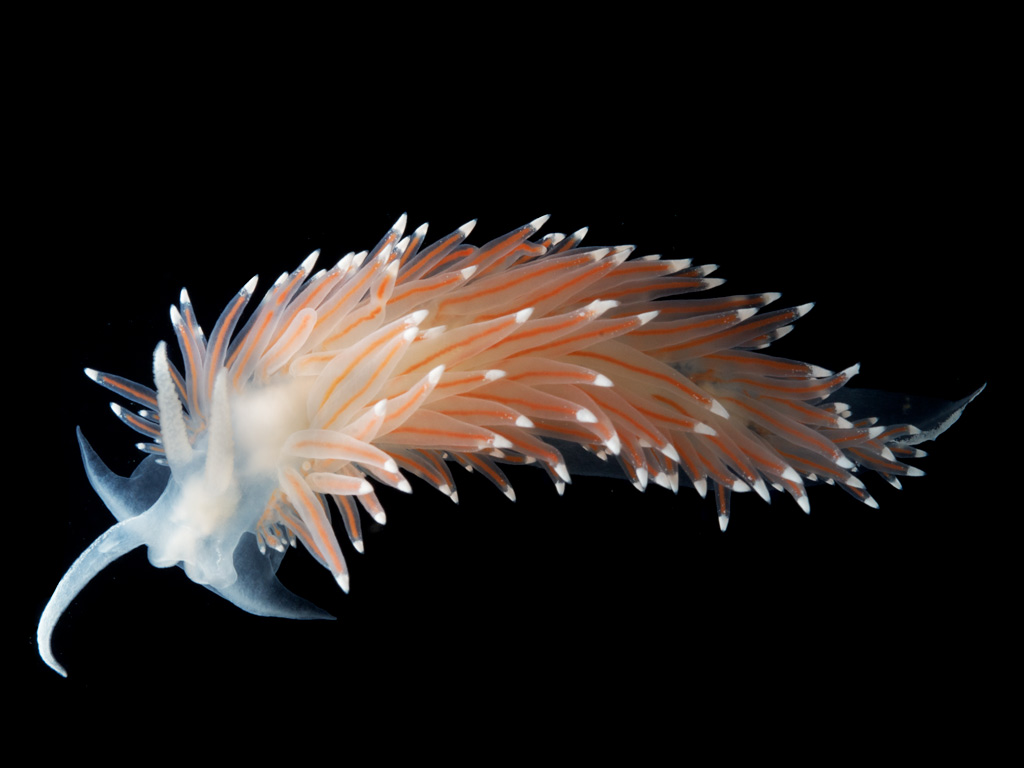
Borealea nobilis

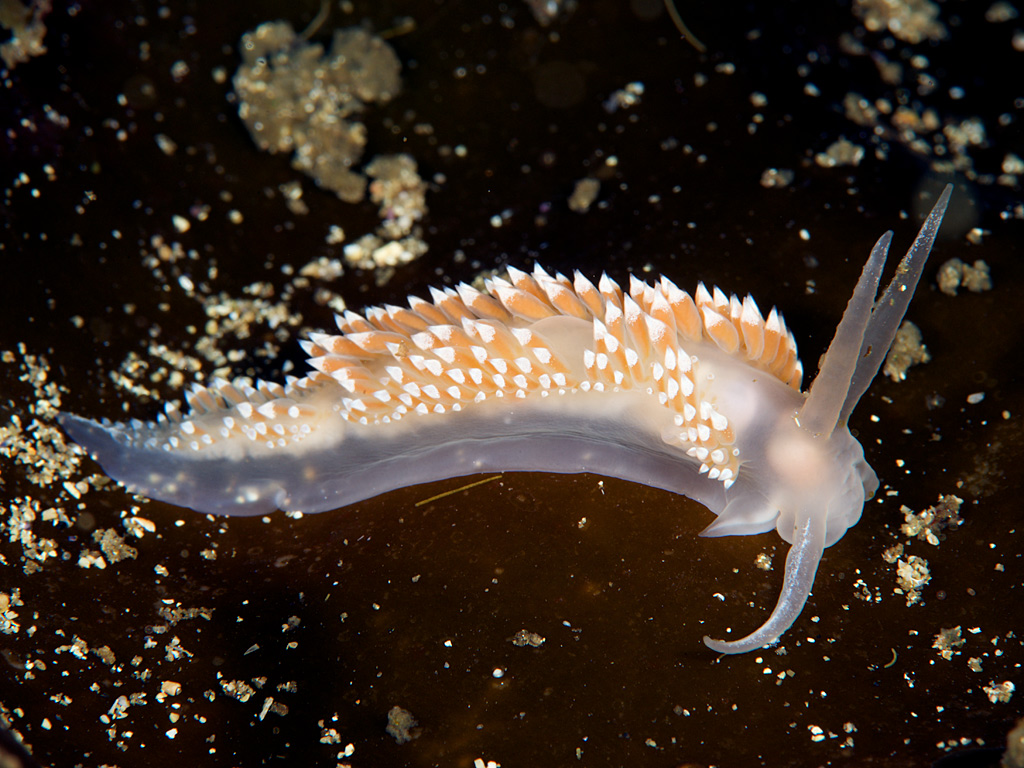
Coryphella verrucosa

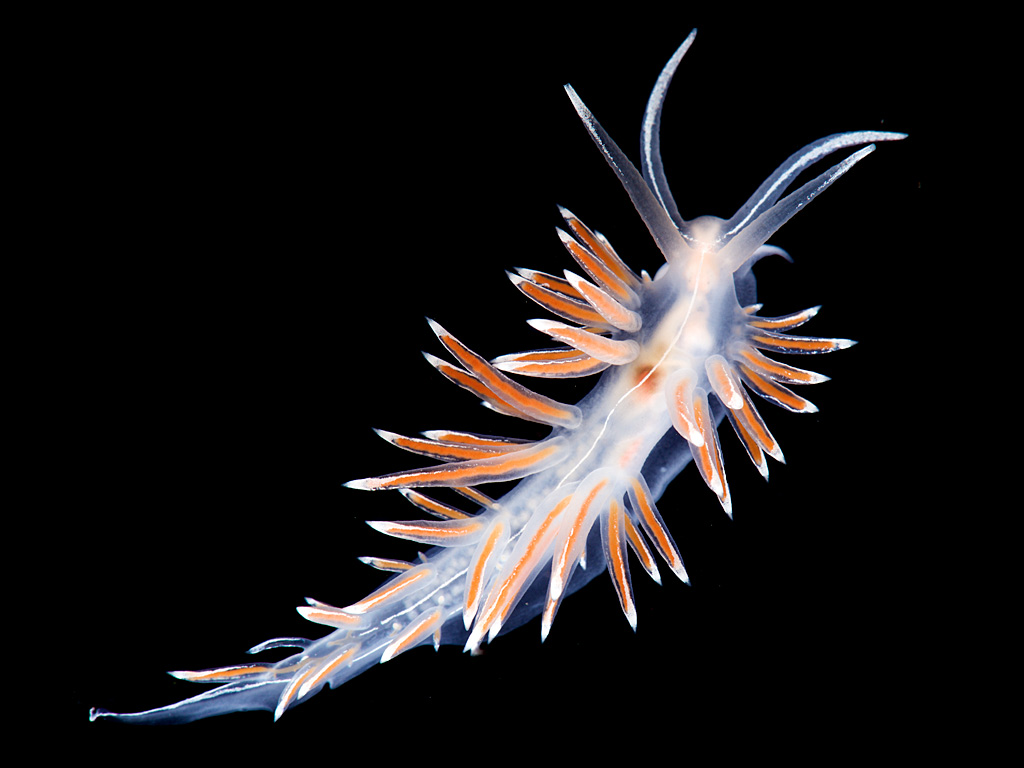
Fjordia lineata

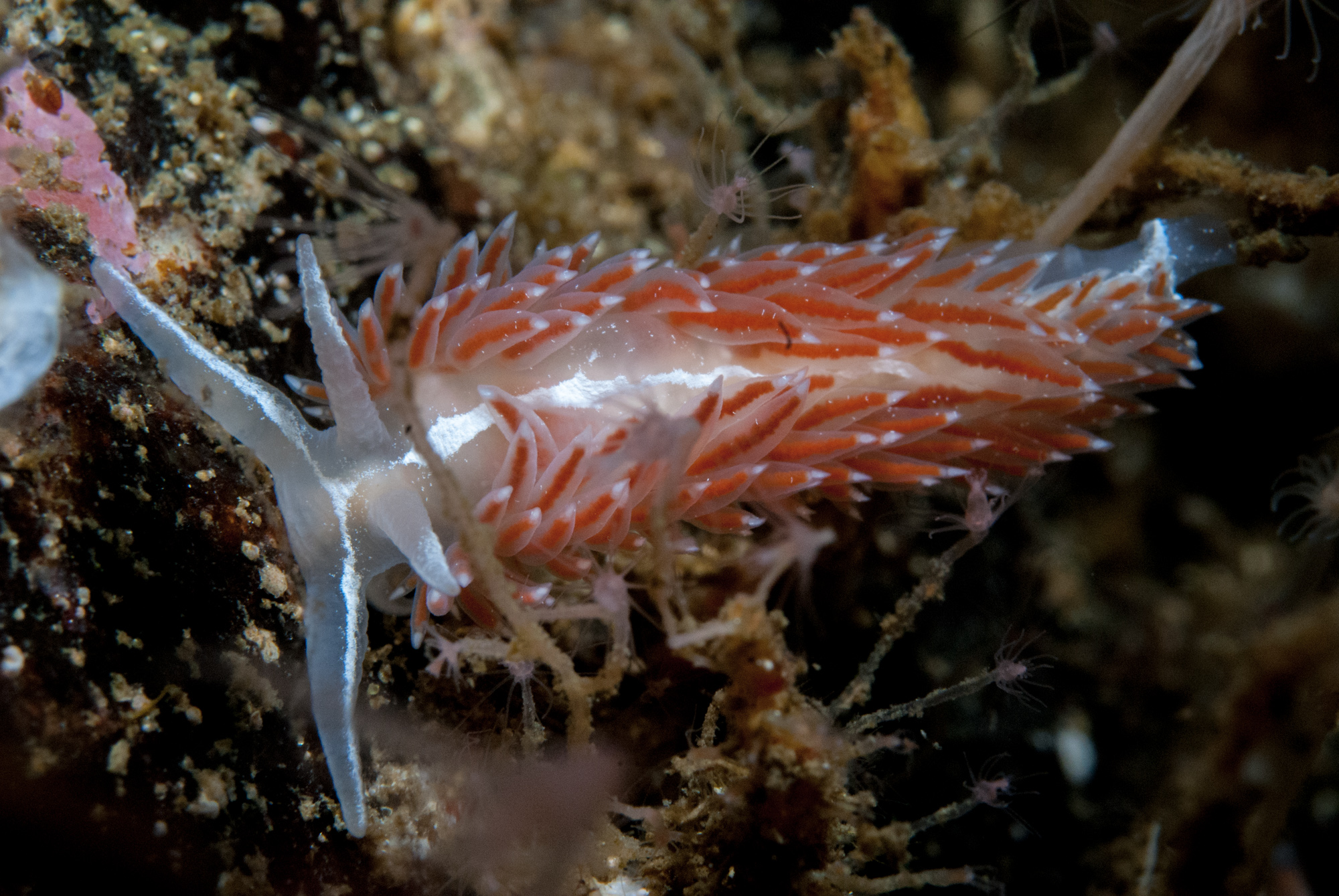
Gulenia monicae

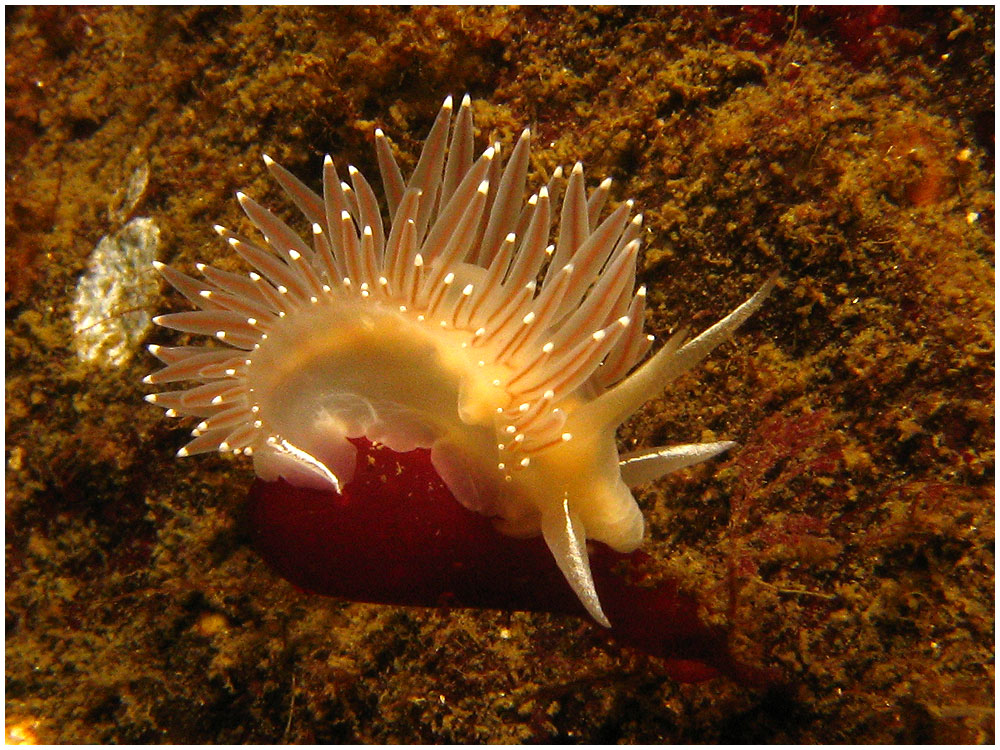
Himatina trophina

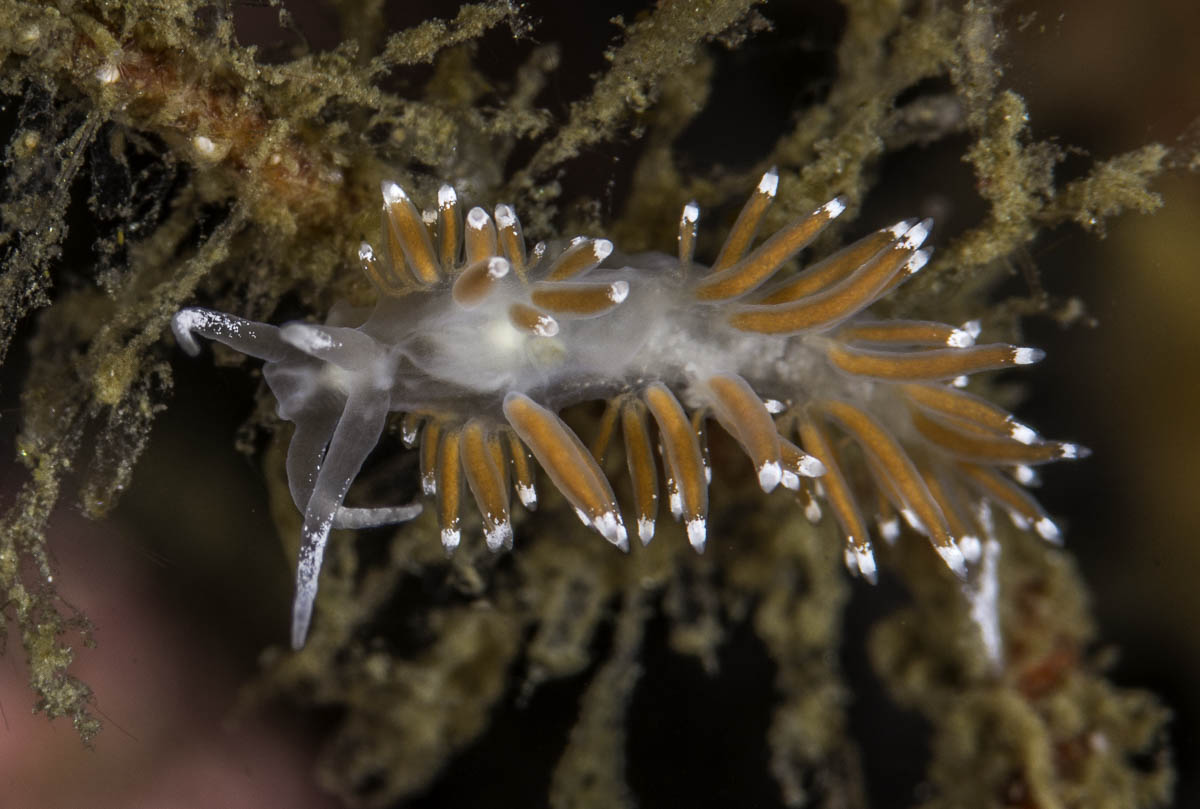
Microchlamylla gracilis
