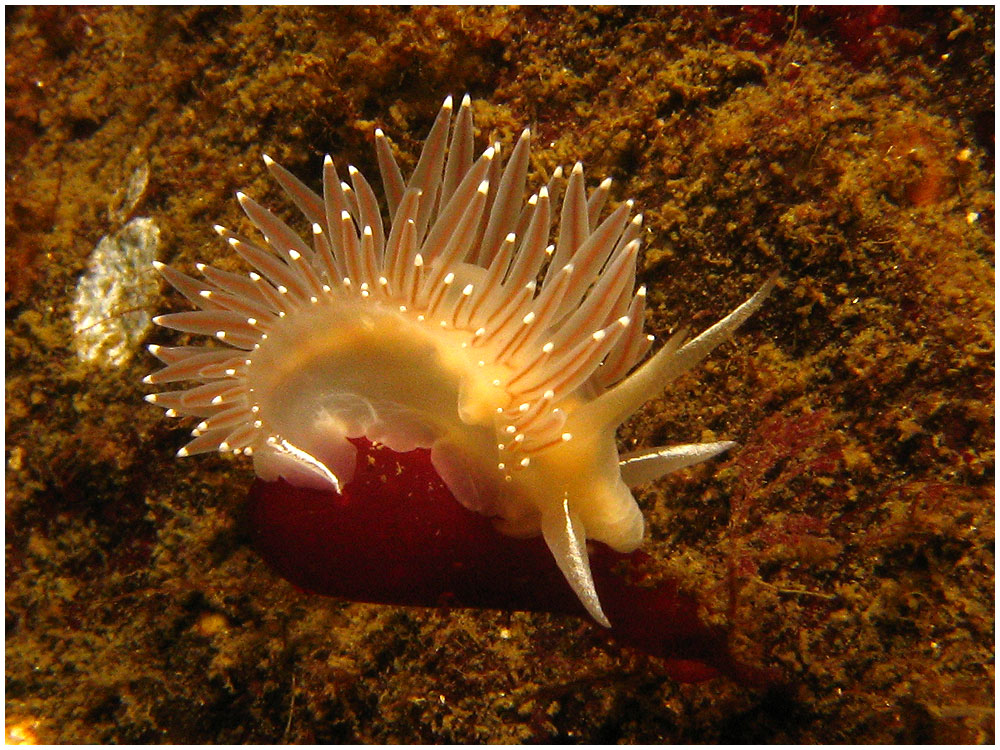

Scientific classification
- Kingdom: Animalia
- Phylum: Mollusca
- Class: Gastropoda
- Order: Nudibranchia
- Suborder: Aeolidacea
- Family: Coryphellidae
- Genus: Himatina
- Species: H. trophina

Binomial name
- Himatina trophina (Bergh, 1890)

Synonyms
- Coryphella fusca O'Donoghue, 1921; Coryphella trophina Bergh, 1890; Flabellina fusca O'Donoghue, 1921; Flabellina triophina (incorrect subsequent spelling); Flabellina trophina Bergh, 1890; Himatella trophina Bergh, 1890 (original combination)

= Himatina trophina =

Species of gastropod

The predaceous aeolis, Himatina trophina, is a species of sea slug, an aeolid nudibranch, a marine heterobranch mollusc in the family Coryphellidae. This species was commonly known as Flabellina fusca, a junior synonym. It is currently the only species within the genus Himatina.

== Distribution ==
This species is frequent in British Columbia and extends around the North Pacific to Alaska and the Sea of Okhotsk, Russia.

== Diet ==
Himatina trophina mainly feeds on hydroids, it was also once believed to feed on tube worms but the species actually just preferred the hydroids which were growing on the outside of the tube worm. It has been reported feeding on other nudibranchs, crustacea and polychaete worms.
