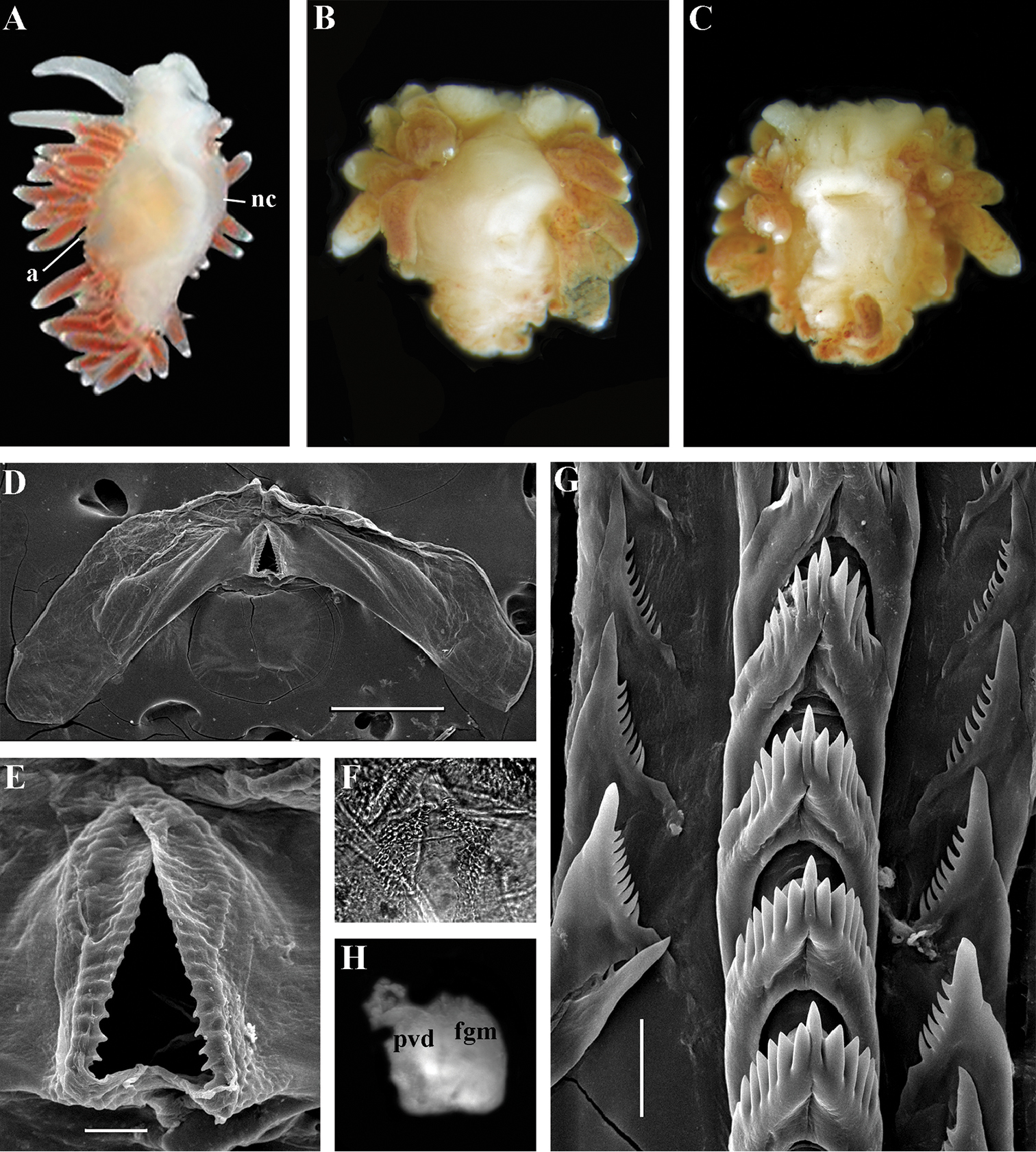

Scientific classification
- Kingdom: Animalia
- Phylum: Mollusca
- Class: Gastropoda
- Order: Nudibranchia
- Suborder: Aeolidacea
- Family: Flabellinidae
- Genus: Coryphella
- Species: C. sanamyanae

Binomial name
- Coryphella sanamyanae (Korshunova, Martynov, Bakken, Evertsen, Fletcher, Mudianta, Saito, Lundin, Schrödl & Picton, 2017)

Synonyms
- Borealea sanamyanae Korshunova, Martynov, Bakken, Evertsen, Fletcher, Mudianta, H. Saito, Lundin, Schrödl & Picton, 2017; Borealia sanamyanae Korshunova, Martynov, Bakken, Evertsen, Fletcher, Mudianta, Saito, Lundin, Schrödl & Picton, 2017

= Coryphella sanamyanae =

Species of gastropod

Coryphella sanamyanae is a species of sea slug, an aeolid nudibranch, a marine heterobranch mollusc in the family Flabellinidae.

== Etymology ==
C. sanamyanae was named after Nadezhda Sanamyan, a marine biologist from Kamchatka credited with making "a considerable contribution in collecting North West Pacific nudibranchs".

== Description ==
Coryphella sanamyanae has a relatively wide body with a narrow notum, and relatively short foot corners. Rhinophores and oral tentacles are similarly sized, the rhinophores themselves being "slightly wrinkled, robust". The cerata are long and fusiform with pointed apices, attached to the body continuously without forming clusters. The body is translucent white. The digestive gland diverticula is dark-red to pinkish, and fills a significant volume of the cerata. The cerata are capped with opaque white pigment.

== Distribution ==
Coryphella sanamyanae was described from a single specimen dredged in 17 m depth Matua Island, Middle Kurile Islands, North West Pacific Ocean.
