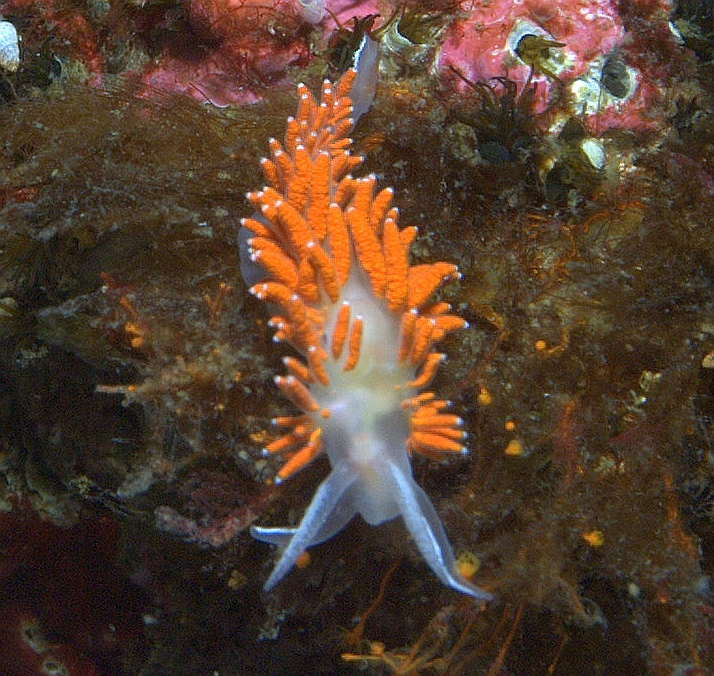

Scientific classification
- Kingdom: Animalia
- Phylum: Mollusca
- Class: Gastropoda
- Order: Nudibranchia
- Suborder: Aeolidacea
- Family: Flabellinidae
- Genus: Coryphella
- Species: C. amabilis

Binomial name
- Coryphella amabilis (Hirano & Kuzirian, 1991)

Synonyms
- Flabellina amabilis Hirano & Kuzirian, 1991; Microchlamylla amabilis (Hirano & Kuzirian, 1991)

= Coryphella amabilis =

Species of gastropod

Coryphella amabilis is a species of sea slug, an aolid nudibranch, a marine gastropod mollusk in the family Flabellinidae.

== Description ==
This species grows to about 26 mm in length. The dorsal midline of the tail contains a white line.

== Distribution ==
Coryphella amabilis is known to occur only in Oshoro Bay (waters off Otaru, Hokkaidō), Japan.
