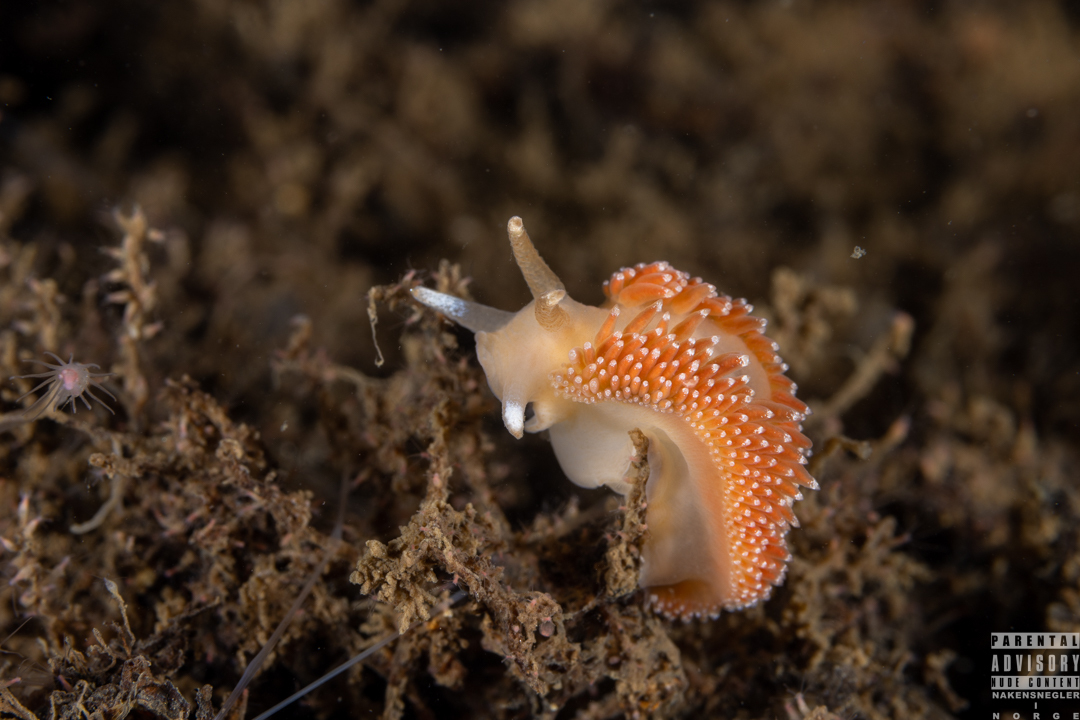

Scientific classification
- Kingdom: Animalia
- Phylum: Mollusca
- Class: Gastropoda
- Order: Nudibranchia
- Suborder: Aeolidacea
- Family: Flabellinidae
- Genus: Coryphella
- Species: C. borealis

Binomial name
- Coryphella borealis Odhner, 1922

Synonyms
- Flabellina borealis (Odhner, 1922); Gulenia borealis (Odhner, 1922)

= Coryphella borealis =

Species of gastropod

Coryphella borealis is a species of sea slug, an aeolid nudibranch, a marine gastropod mollusk in the family Flabellinidae.

== Distribution ==
This species was described from Norway. It has been found in deeper waters of the North Sea associated with the sea pen Funiculina quadrangularis.
