= Coryphella insolita =

Scientific classification
- Kingdom: Animalia
- Phylum: Mollusca
- Class: Gastropoda
- Order: Nudibranchia
- Suborder: Aeolidacea
- Family: Flabellinidae
- Genus: Coryphella
- Species: C. insolita

Binomial name
- Coryphella insolita (García-Gómez & Cervera, 1989)

Synonyms
- Fjorida insolita (García-Gómez & Cervera, 1989); Flabellina insolita García-Gómez & Cervera, 1989

Species of gastropod

Coryphella insolita is a species of sea slug, an aolid nudibranch, a marine gastropod mollusk in the family Flabellinidae.

Ekimova et al. (2026) placed it within Coryphella provisionally based upon morphological analysis, believing molecular data is needed to confirm or otherwise clarify its placement.

== Distribution ==
This species occurs in the Strait of Gibraltar and Spain.
