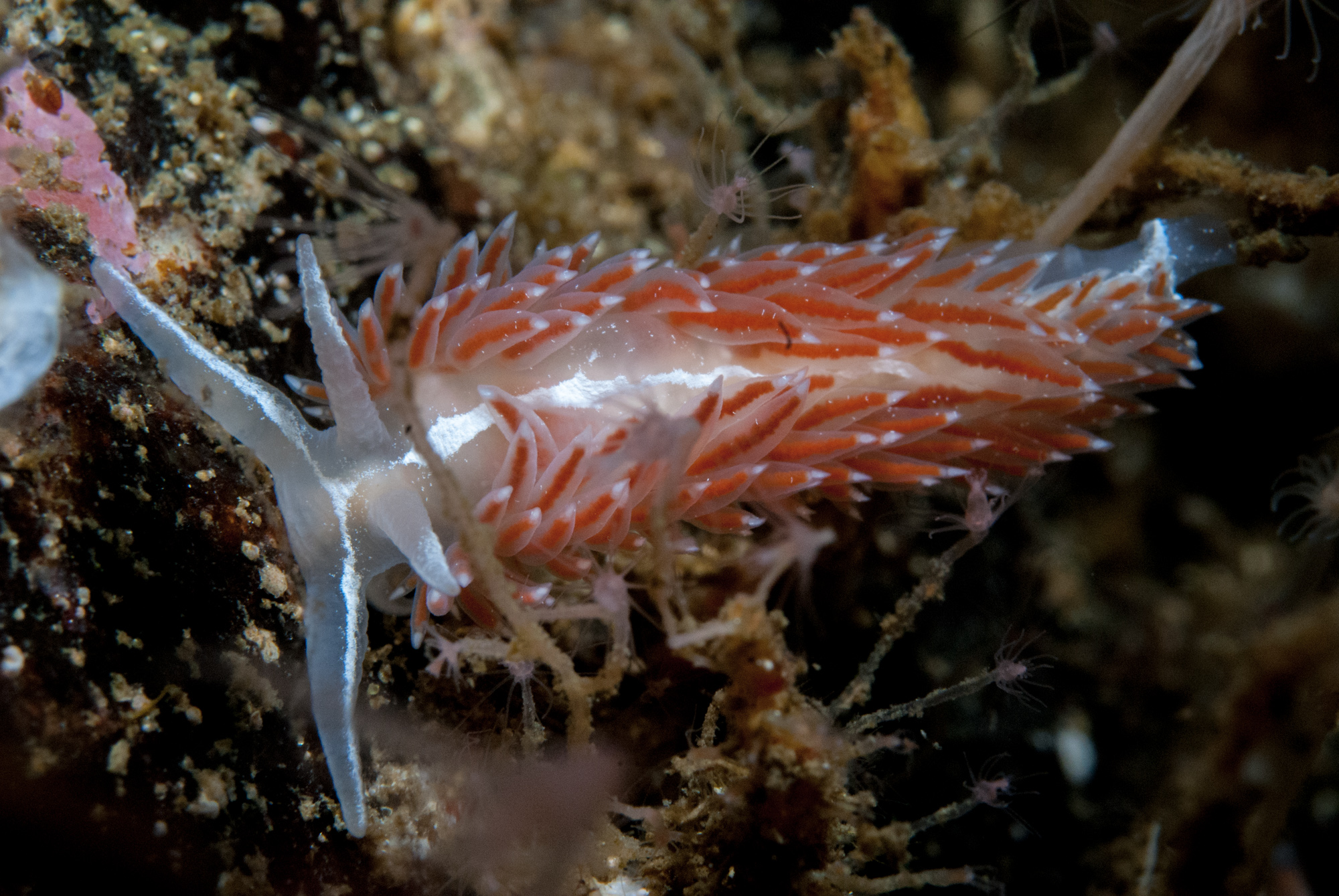
- The nudibranch, Gulenia monicae, at Gulen Dive Resort, Norway.

Scientific classification
- Kingdom: Animalia
- Phylum: Mollusca
- Class: Gastropoda
- Order: Nudibranchia
- Suborder: Aeolidacea
- Family: Flabellinidae
- Genus: Coryphella
- Species: C. monicae

Binomial name
- Coryphella monicae (Korshunova, Martynov, Bakken, Evertsen, Fletcher, Mudianta, Saito, Lundin, Schrödl & Picton, 2017)

Synonyms
- Gulenia monicae Korshunova, Martynov, Bakken, Evertsen, Fletcher, Mudianta, Saito, Lundin, Schrödl & Picton, 2017

= Coryphella monicae =

Species of gastropod

Coryphella monicae is a species of sea slug, an aeolid nudibranch, a marine heterobranch mollusc in the family Flabellinidae.

== Distribution ==
Coryphella monicae was described from specimens collected at 10–30 m depth at Gulen Dive Centre, Norway, Atlantic Ocean, 60.9578°N 5.1284°E.
