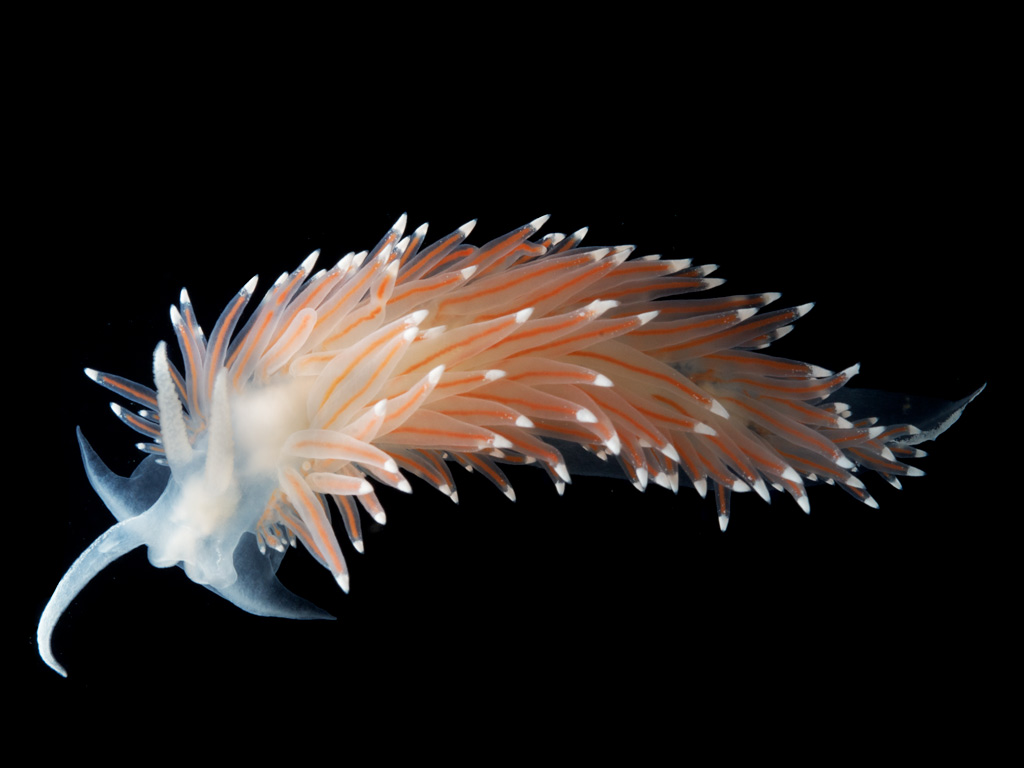
- Coryphella nobilis from Gulen Dive Resort, Norway.

Scientific classification
- Kingdom: Animalia
- Phylum: Mollusca
- Class: Gastropoda
- Order: Nudibranchia
- Suborder: Aeolidacea
- Family: Flabellinidae
- Genus: Coryphella
- Species: C. nobilis

Binomial name
- Coryphella nobilis A. E. Verrill, 1880

Synonyms
- Borealea nobilis (A. E. Verrill, 1880); Coryphella sarsi Friele, 1903; Flabellina nobilis (A. E. Verrill, 1880); Flabellina sarsi (Friele, 1903); Himatina nobilis ( A. E. Verrill, 1880)

= Coryphella nobilis =

Species of gastropod

Coryphella nobilis is a species of sea slug, an aeolid nudibranch, a marine heterobranch mollusc in the family Flabellinidae.

== Distribution ==
Coryphella nobilis was described from a single specimen dredged in 145 m depth off Cape Cod in 1879. It is widely distributed in the northern Atlantic Ocean from Norway south to Ireland and on the North American coast south to New England.

== Description ==
This species is translucent white with opaque white markings. The digestive gland in the cerata is either orange or red in colour. The rhinophores are pale yellow-brown in colour and covered with small papillae.

This species grows to 40–50 mm (4–5 cm) in length. The maximum recorded body length is 63 mm.

== Ecology ==
Minimum recorded depth is 20 m. Maximum recorded depth is 190 m.
