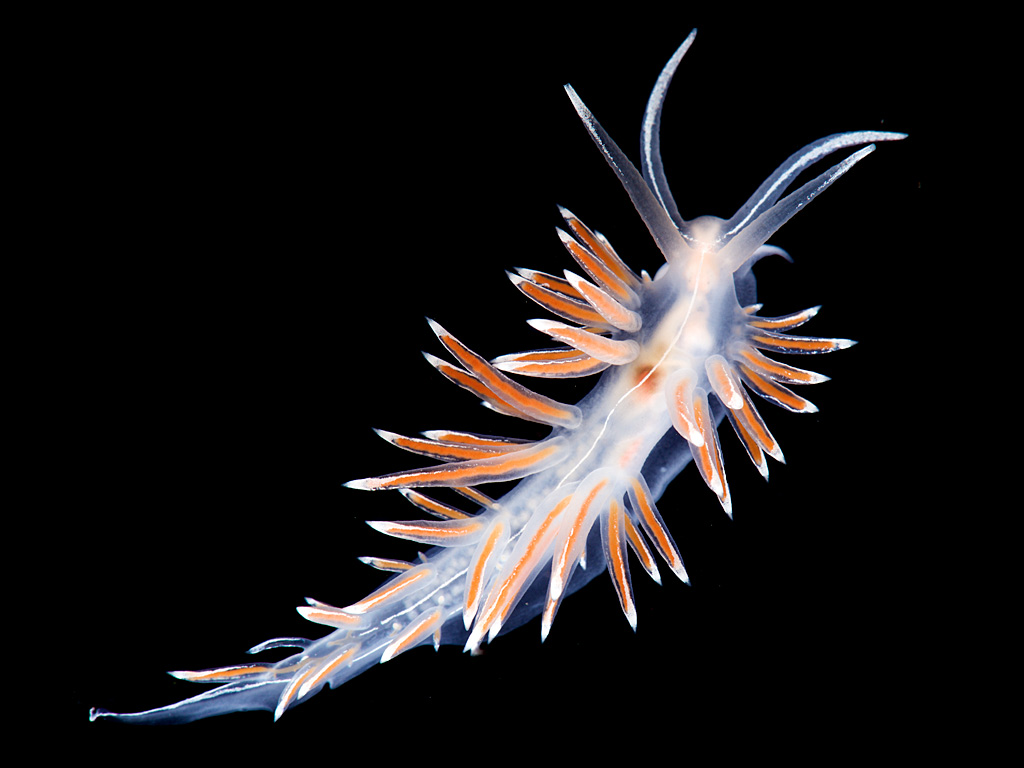
- The nudibranch Fjordia lineata, Gulen Dive Resort, Norway.
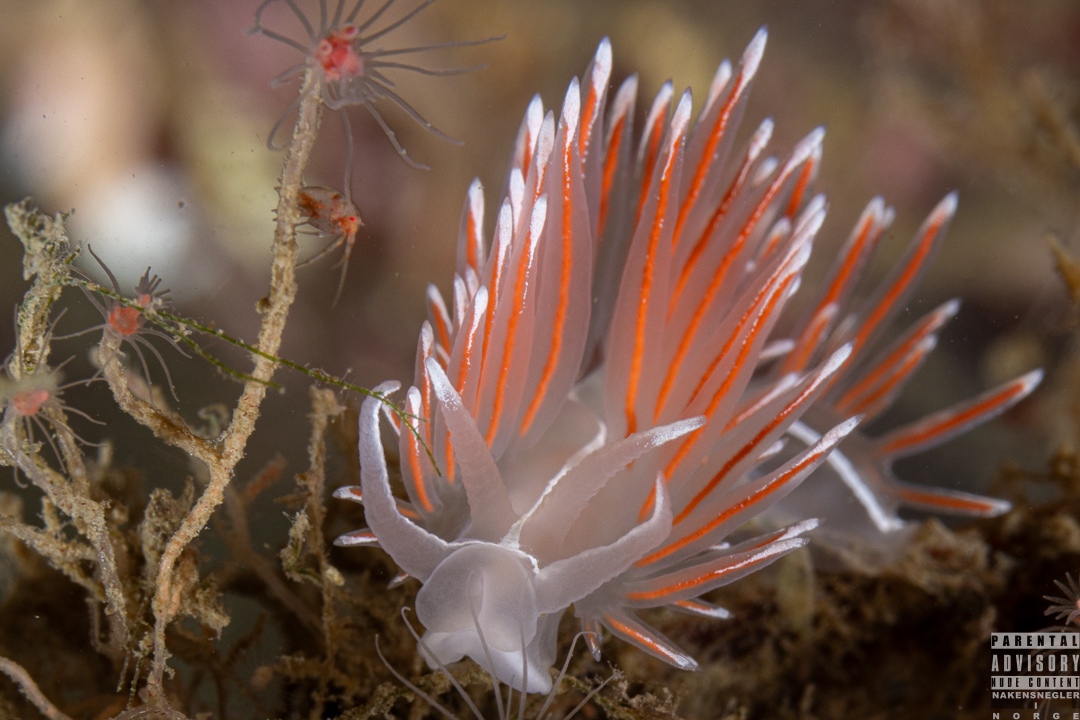
- Fjordia lineata amongst its food

Scientific classification
- Kingdom: Animalia
- Phylum: Mollusca
- Class: Gastropoda
- Order: Nudibranchia
- Suborder: Aeolidacea
- Family: Coryphellidae
- Genus: Fjordia
- Species: F. lineata

Binomial name
- Fjordia lineata (Lovén, 1846)

Synonyms
- Aeolis argenteolineata Costa, 1866; Aeolis lineata Lovén, 1846; Coryphella lineata (Lovén, 1846); Flabellina lineata (Lovén, 1846)

= Fjordia lineata =

Species of gastropod

Fjordia lineata is a species of sea slug, an aeolid nudibranch, a marine heterobranch mollusc in the family Coryphellidae.

== Description ==
Fjordia lineata are commonly 20-30mm (2-3 cm) in length and are seen in a variety of colours, translucent white with either red, red-brown, yellow, or orange colouring of the digestive gland within the cerata.

== Diet ==
This species feeds on hydroids such as Tubularia indivisa.

== Distribution ==
Fjordia lineata can be found throughout the British Isles, and can also be found south as far as the Mediterranean Sea and north to Norway.
