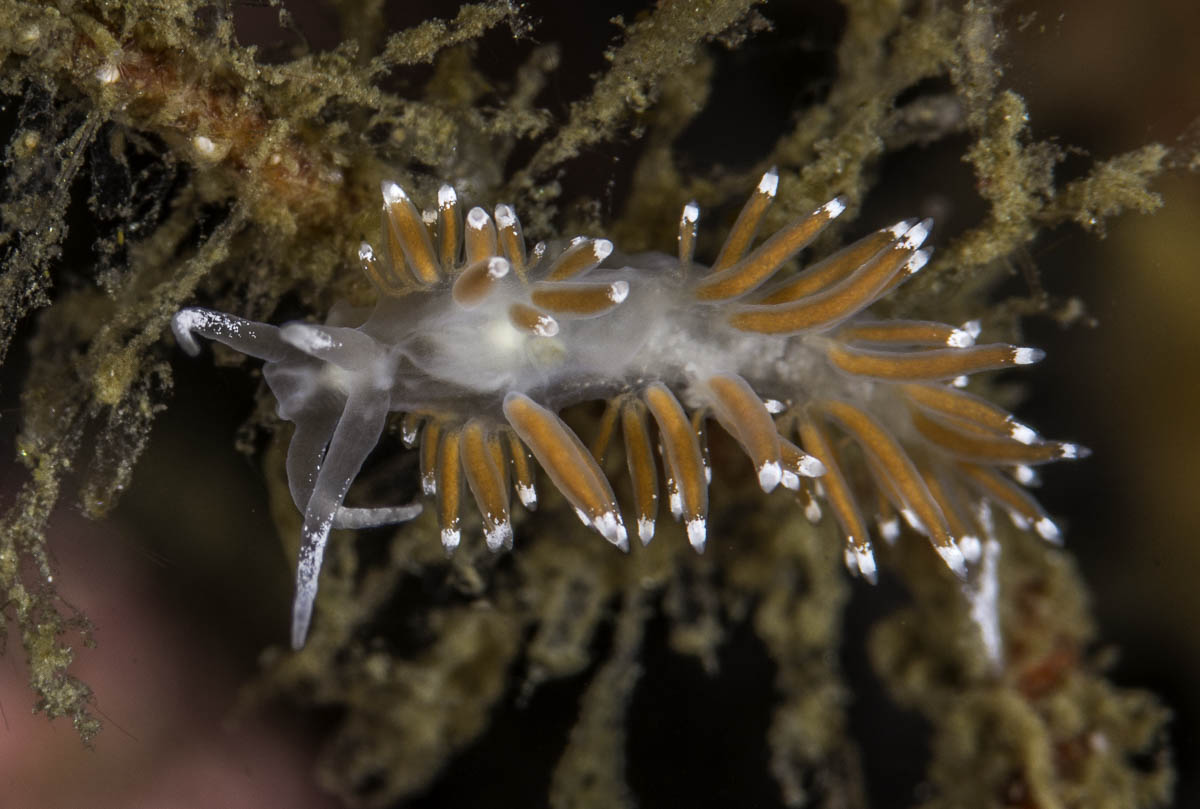
- Gulen Dive Centre, Norway

Scientific classification
- Kingdom: Animalia
- Phylum: Mollusca
- Class: Gastropoda
- Order: Nudibranchia
- Suborder: Aeolidacea
- Family: Flabellinidae
- Genus: Coryphella
- Species: C. gracilis

Binomial name
- Coryphella gracilis (Alder & Hancock, 1844)

Synonyms
- Eolis gracilis Alder & Hancock, 1844; Flabellina gracilis (Alder & Hancock, 1844); Microchlamylla gracilis (Alder & Hancock, 1844); Eolis smaragdina Alder & Hancock, 1851; Coryphella rufibranchialis var. clavigera Odhner, 1929

= Coryphella gracilis =

Species of gastropod

Coryphella gracilis, sometimes known by the common name slender eolis, is a species of sea slug, an aeolid nudibranch, a marine gastropod mollusc in the family Flabellinidae .

== Distribution ==
This species was described from Cullercoats, North Sea. It is a fairly common species found in current-swept sites from northern France to Norway and Iceland. It is also reported from the East coast of North America from Newfoundland south to New England.

== Description ==
Coryphella gracilis has a narrow body and cerata in well defined clusters. The cerata have a narrow band of white pigment at the tip which is often broken into spots. Mature animals typically measure 12–15 mm in length. The maximum recorded body length is 25 mm.

== Ecology ==
Minimum recorded depth is 0 m. Maximum recorded depth is 33 m.

The diet of this species is hydroids of the genus Eudendrium.
