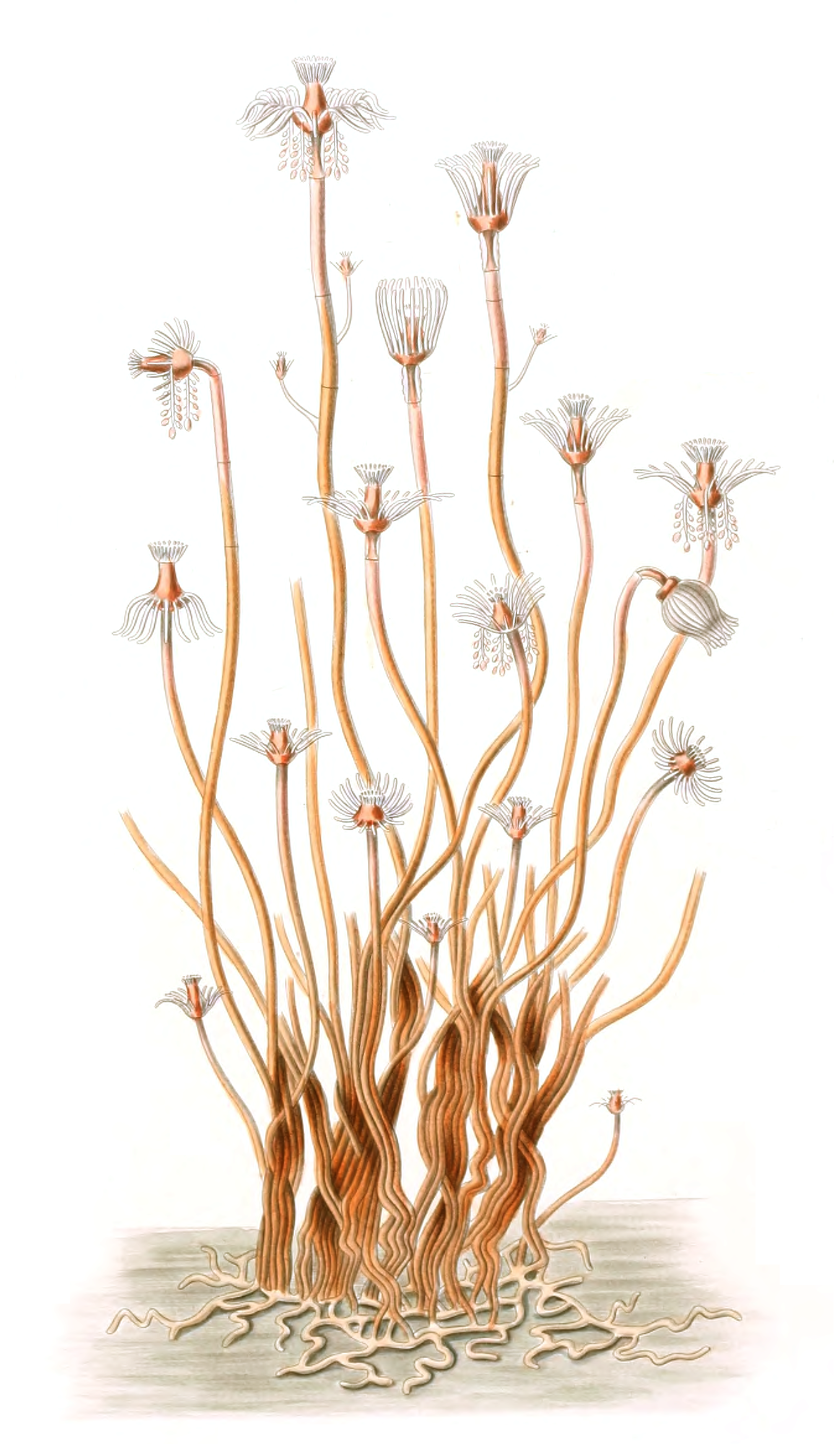
- Colony of Tubularia indivisa

Scientific classification
- Kingdom: Animalia
- Phylum: Cnidaria
- Class: Hydrozoa
- Order: Anthoathecata
- Family: Tubulariidae
- Genus: Tubularia
- Species: T. indivisa

Binomial name
- Tubularia indivisa Linnaeus, 1758

Synonyms
- Tubularia ceratogyne Pérez, 1920; Tubularia simplex Alder, 1862

= Tubularia indivisa =

Oaten pipes hydroid

Species of hydrozoan

Tubularia indivisa (oaten pipes hydroid) is a species of large hydroid described in 1758.

== Description ==
T. Indivisa is observed to have around 40 oral tentacles surrounded by 20–30 larger tentacles. This outer ring of larger tentacles are paler and longer than the inner ring of oral tentacles. The tough and yellow unbranched stems are clustered together and fuse at the base of the colony. The color of the single polyp itself can range from a pale pink to a red and in spring (mainly), red or pink gonotheca grow between the inner set of oral tentacles. The gonotheca has been described as "part of hydroid producing gametes where eggs are often incubated until the larva is released". The polyps are observed with a conical or flask shape and present only in spring, with the diameter of the polyp and tentacles being around 15 millimetres (1/2 inch) in length and the overall height observed of the entire organism ranging from 10–15 centimetres (4–6 in).

Key identification features include:

- Large pink/red polyp
- Outer and inner cluster ring of tentacles
- Yellow stems are single and unbranched

=== Similar species ===
T. indivisa have been confused with T. larynx. The two are confused because they often occur and are seen together. In T. larynx the stems are branched while in T. indivisa they are unbranched.

== Distribution and habitat ==
T. indivisa have been observed living in small clumps on all coasts of the British Isles and are widespread in Britain and Ireland. They live strictly in a marine environment and have been spotted in the North Sea, Norwegian Sea, and the English Channel. T. indivisa attach to bedrock, boulders as well as other substrata such as kelp stipes. They have also been observed growing through sheets of sponges (such as Myxilla incrustans and Halichondria panicea), as well as through patches of the barnacle (Balanus crenatus) and the tubes of some amphipods (Jassa spp.). They are seen to be abundant where strong tidal currents occur and grow on various hard surfaces in different water depths ranging from shallow near shore to great depths. Occasionally, they are seen living among seaweeds haptera in "current-swept" areas. Because of their strong attachment points as well as their ability to recover quickly, they are very flexible which allows them to bend with the tide. These areas also have high turbidity levels for a majority of the year.

=== Abundance at shipwrecks ===
Shipwrecks on the Belgian waters are the only known locations where T. indivisa is the dominant feature yearly of a community; recreational diver records also have confirmed T. indivisa's dominance. In normal conditions, they are present but not the dominant species. More than 200 shipwrecks have been recorded in Belgian waters with densities of up to 100,000 T. indivisa individuals at these locations. One observed shipwreck, the Kilmore, has been underwater since 1906 in the waters of the North Sea. In the month of July, T. indivisa accounted for 59–82% of total biomass at this shipwreck as it plays an important role in this habitat. These findings supported that shipwrecks in Belgian waters provide development and in turn, a high biomass of T. indivisa species on a repetitive annual cycle. Nine other shipwrecks near the Belgian coast were investigated and T. indivisa as well as T. larynx dominated each site with a total of 90 species recorded and T. indivisa and T. larynx accounting for 69% of the total biomass. However, the biomass was lower on offshore sites as compared to the intermediate sites. T. indivisa has been replacing Metridium senile, thus becoming the dominant species on UK shipwrecks where the tidal currents are strong.

== Ecology ==
T. indivisa provides a habitat for 12 bacteria and species groups. It contains bacterial aggregates in their tentacles epidermis which contains hundreds of tightly packed, differently shaped endobacteria. T. indivisa is also a habitat for the potentially pathogenic Endozoicimonas elysicola, which is suspected to play a role in amoebic fish disease.

T. indivisa were studied in Felixstone, Suffolk, and were observed to breed the most in the spring as well as late summer (though they are able to breed throughout the year). Through observation in spring cohorts, it has been seen that reproduction can occur within 6–8 weeks and have a large larval dispersal capacity. These larvae can settle 1–10 kilometres (0.6–6 miles) from the parental source and reach sexual maturity at a rapid rate. Their reproductive sacs are noted to be the sporosacs type rather than the Medusae. They are preyed upon by the nudibranch Dendrontous frodosus. The nudibranchs as well as Catriona gymnota are observed to eat the polyps, leaving only the stems. T. indivisa's mortality rate is observed to be around 2% per month in the winter and up to 70% per month in the summer because of nudibranchs. Their life span is around one year and their mean post-larval life expectancy can range from 30 days to 160 days.
