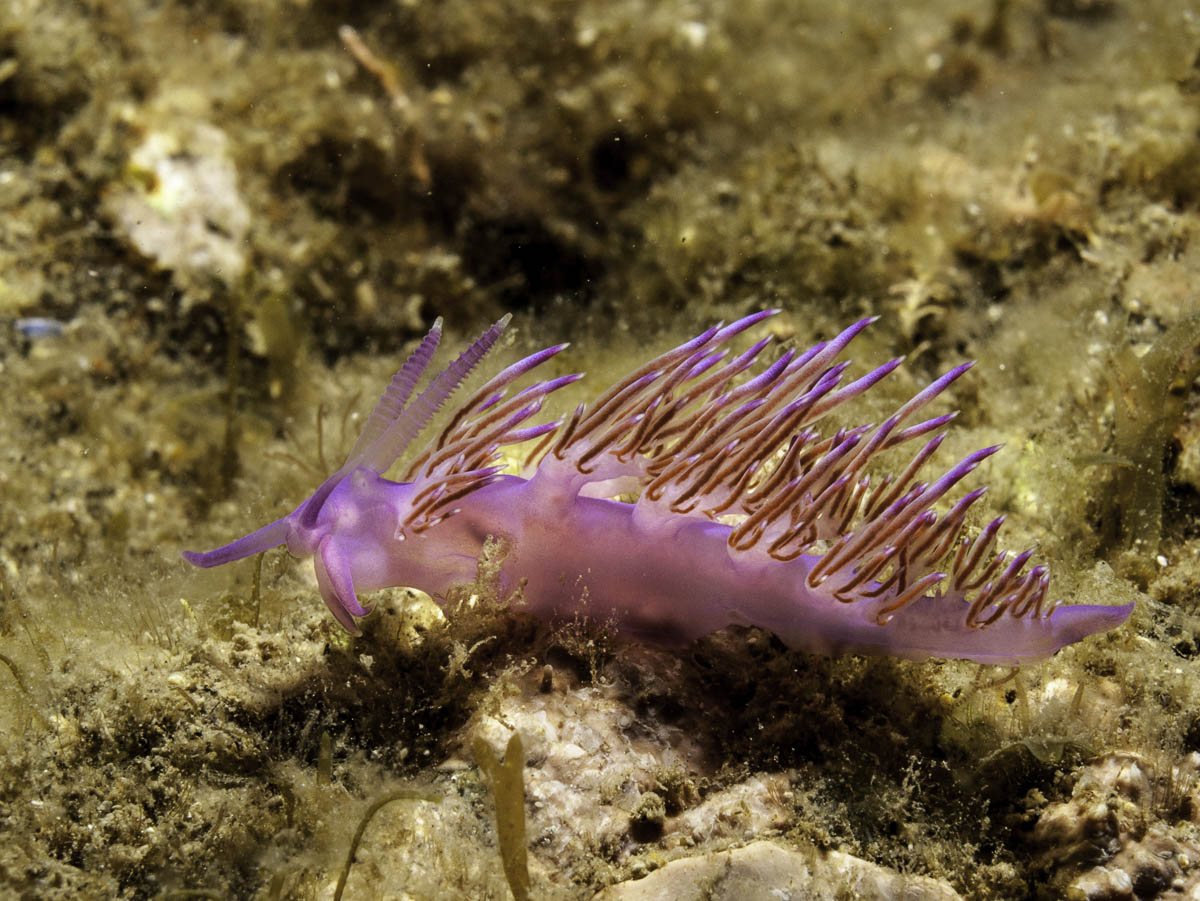
- Flabellina affinis

Scientific classification
- Kingdom: Animalia
- Phylum: Mollusca
- Class: Gastropoda
- Order: Nudibranchia
- Suborder: Aeolidacea
- Family: Flabellinidae
- Genus: Flabellina; Gray [in Griffith & Pidgeon], 1833

Type species
- Doris affinis Gmelin, 1791

= Flabellina =

Genus of gastropods

Flabellina is a genus of sea slugs, specifically aeolid nudibranchs. These animals are marine gastropod molluscs in the family Flabellinidae.

== Taxonomic history ==
The genus Flabellina was established by John Edward Gray in 1833 with the type species Flabellina affinis and characterised by the cerata being arranged on peduncles and the rhinophores being annulate. Many species were added by subsequent authors. In 1981 the genus Coryphella was merged under the older name Flabellina as despite a large range of morphological characters in the 64 species of Flabellinidae and Coryphellidae known at that time, no clear distinction could be found to separate the species into the two genera. In 2017 an integrative study of the 71 species then considered to be included in Flabellina redistributed the species into seven families and 26 genera.

== Species ==
Species currently included in this genus are:

- Flabellina affinis (Gmelin, 1791)
- Flabellina alternata Ortea & Espinosa, 1998
- Flabellina bulbosa Ortea & Espinosa, 1998
- Flabellina dana Millen & Hamann, 2006
- Flabellina dushia (Ev. Marcus & Er. Marcus, 1963)
- Flabellina engeli Ev. Marcus & Er. Marcus, 1968
  - Flabellina engeli lucianae Dacosta, Cunha, Simone & Schrödl, 2007
- Flabellina evelinae Edmunds, 1989
- Flabellina ilidioi Calado, Ortea & Caballer, 2005
- Flabellina llerae Ortea, 1989

Synonymized species

- Flabellina albomaculata Pola, Carmona, Calado & Cervera, 2014: synonym of Edmundsella albomaculata (Pola, Carmona, Calado & Cervera, 2014)
- Flabellina albomarginata (M. C. Miller, 1971): synonym of Coryphellina albomarginata (M. C. Miller, 1971)
- Flabellina alisonae Gosliner, 1980: synonym of Flabellina bicolor (Kelaart, 1858)
- Flabellina arveloi Ortea & Espinosa, 1998: synonym of Coryphellina arveloi (Ortea & Espinosa, 1998)
- Flabellina athadona (Bergh, 1875): synonym of Occidenthella athadona (Bergh, 1875)
- Flabellina babai Schmekel, 1972: synonym of Luisella babai (Schmekel, 1972)
- Flabellina baetica Garcia-Gomez, 1984: synonym of Baenopsis baetica (Garcia-Gomez, 1984)
- Flabellina bertschi Gosliner & Kuzirian, 1990: synonym of Edmundsella bertschi (Gosliner & Kuzirian, 1990)
- Flabellina bicolor (Kelaart, 1858): synonym of Samla bicolor (Kelaart, 1858)
- Flabellina bilas Gosliner & Willan, 1991: synonym of Samla bilas (Gosliner & Willan, 1991)
- Flabellina californica (Bergh, 1904): synonym of Coryphella californica Bergh, 1904
- Flabellina cerverai Fischer, van der Velde & Roubos, 2007: synonym of Coryphellina cerverai (Fischer, van der Velde & Roubos, 2007)
- Flabellina confusa Gonzalez-Duarte, Cervera & Poddubetskaia, 2008: synonym of Calmella gaditana (Cervera, García-Gomez & García, 1987)
- Flabellina cooperi (Cockerell, 1901) synonym of Orienthella cooperi (Cockerell, 1901)
- Flabellina cynara (Ev. Marcus & Er. Marcus, 1963): synonym of Kynaria cynara (Ev. Marcus & Er. Marcus, 1967)
- Flabellina delicata Gosliner & Willan, 1991: synonym of Coryphellina delicata (Gosliner & Willan, 1991)
- Flabellina exoptata Gosliner & Willan, 1991: synonym of Coryphellina exoptata (Gosliner & Willan, 1991)
- Flabellina falklandica (Eliot, 1907): synonym of Itaxia falklandica (Eliot, 1907)
- Flabellina funeka Gosliner & Griffiths, 1981: synonym of Paraflabellina funeka (Gosliner & Griffiths, 1981)
- Flabellina fusca (O'Donoghue, 1921): synonym of Flabellina trophina (Bergh, 1890)
- Flabellina goddardi Gosliner, 2010: synonym of Pacifia goddardi (Gosliner, 2010)
- Flabellina hamanni Gosliner, 1994: synonym of Coryphellina hamanni (Gosliner, 1994)
- Flabellina ianthina Angas, 1864: synonym of Pteraeolidia ianthina (Angas, 1864)
- Flabellina inornata A. Costa, 1866: synonym of Spurilla neapolitana (Delle Chiaje, 1841)
- Flabellina insolita Garcia-Gomez & Cervera, 1989: synonym of Fjordia insolita (Garcia-Gomez & Cervera, 1989)
- Flabellina iodinea (J. G. Cooper, 1863): synonym of Flabellinopsis iodinea (J. G. Cooper, 1863)
- Flabellina ischitana Hirano & Thompson, 1990: synonym of Paraflabellina ischitana (Hirano & Thompson, 1990)
- Flabellina islandica (Odhner, 1937): synonym of Paracoryphella islandica (Odhner, 1937)
- Flabellina japonica (Volodchenko, 1937): synonym of Ziminella japonica (Volodchenko, 1937)
- Flabellina macassarana Bergh, 1905: synonym of Samla macassarana (Bergh, 1905)
- Flabellina marcusorum Gosliner & Kuzirian, 1990: synonym of Coryphellina marcusorum (Gosliner & Kuzirian, 1990)
- Flabellina newcombi Angas, 1864: synonym of Facelina newcombi (Angas, 1864)
- Flabellina ornata Angas, 1864: synonym of Austraeolis ornata (Angas, 1864)
- Flabellina pallida (A. E. Verrill, 1900): synonym of Coryphella pallida A. E. Verrill, 1900
- Flabellina parva (Hadfield, 1963): synonym of Paracoryphella parva (Hadfield, 1963)
- Flabellina pedata (Montagu, 1815): synonym of Edmundsella pedata (Montagu, 1816)
- Flabellina pellucida (Alder & Hancock, 1843): synonym of Carronella pellucida (Alder & Hancock, 1843)
- Flabellina poenicia (Burn, 1957): synonym of Coryphellina poenicia (Burn, 1957)
- Flabellina polaris Volodchenko, 1946: synonym of Polaria polaris (Volodchenko, 1946)
- Flabellina pricei (MacFarland, 1966): synonym of Apata pricei (MacFarland, 1966)
- Flabellina riwo Gosliner & Willan, 1991: synonym of Samla riwo Gosliner & Willan, 1991
- Flabellina rubrolineata (O'Donoghue, 1929): synonym of Coryphellina rubrolineata O'Donoghue, 1929
- Flabellina rubromaxilla Edmunds, 2015: synonym of Paraflabellina rubromaxilla (Edmunds, 2015)
- Flabellina rubropurpurata Gosliner & Willan, 1991: synonym of Samla rubropurpurata (Gosliner & Willan, 1991)
- Flabellina salmonacea (Couthouy, 1838): synonym of Ziminella salmonacea (Couthouy, 1838)
- Flabellina scolopendrella Risbec, 1928: synonym of Pteraeolidia ianthina (Angas, 1864)
- Flabellina semperi Bergh, 1870: synonym of Pteraeolidia ianthina (Angas, 1864)
- Flabellina stohleri Bertsch & Ferreira, 1974: synonym of Flabellina telja Ev. Marcus & Er. Marcus, 1967
- Flabellina telja Ev. Marcus & Er. Marcus, 1967: synonym of Samla telja (Ev. Marcus & Er. Marcus, 1967)
- Flabellina trilineata (O'Donoghue, 1921): synonym of Orienthella trilineata (O'Donoghue, 1921)
- Flabellina trophina (Bergh, 1890): synonym of Himatina trophina (Bergh, 1890)
- Flabellina vansyoci Gosliner, 1994: synonym of Edmundsella vansyoci (Gosliner, 1994)
- Flabellina verrucicornis A. Costa, 1867: synonym of Berghia verrucicornis (A. Costa, 1867)
- Flabellina versicolor Costa A., 1866: synonym of Favorinus branchialis (Rathke, 1806)
- Flabellina verta (Ev. Marcus, 1970): synonym of Coryphella verta Ev. Marcus, 1970
