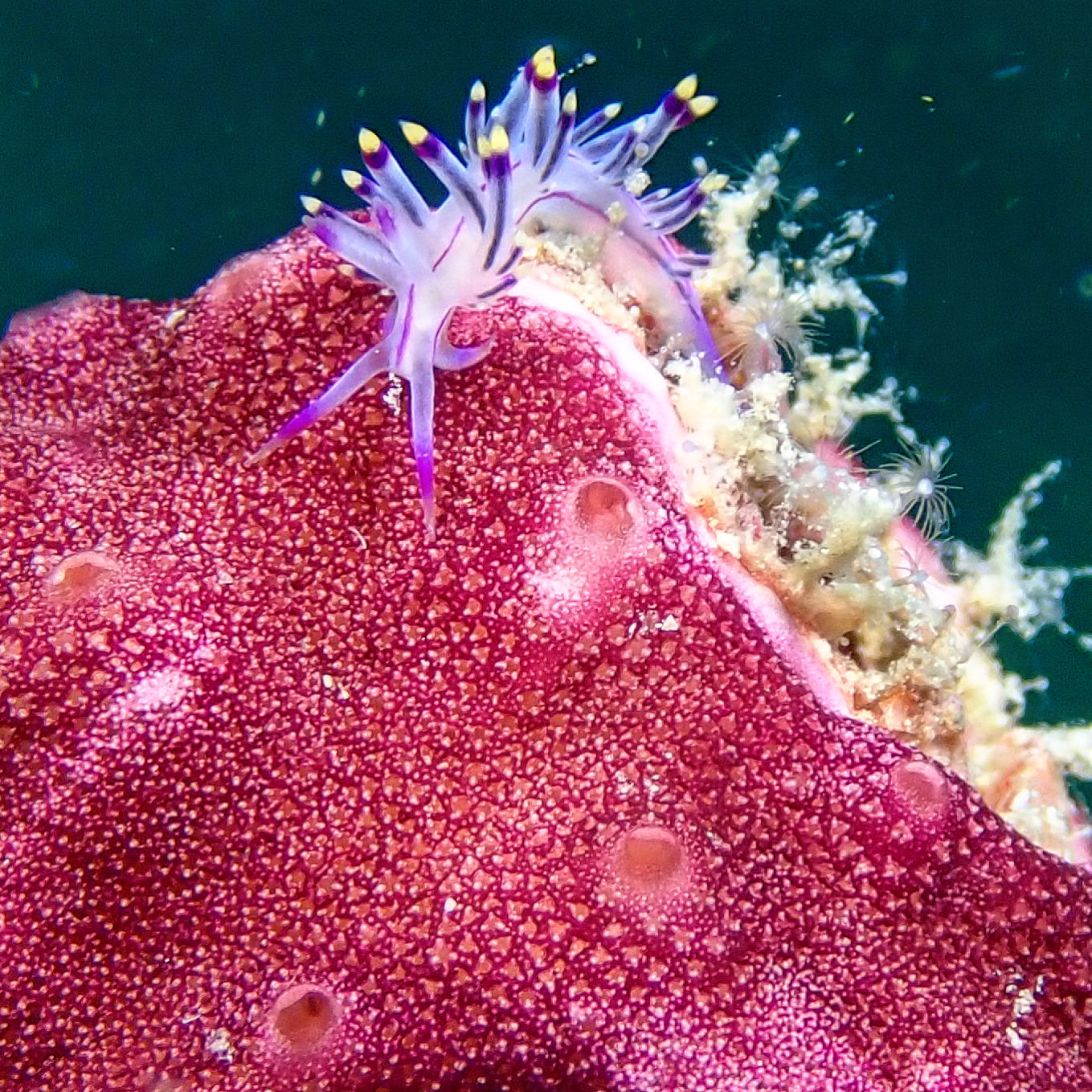

Scientific classification
- Kingdom: Animalia
- Phylum: Mollusca
- Class: Gastropoda
- Order: Nudibranchia
- Suborder: Aeolidacea
- Family: Flabellinidae
- Genus: Coryphellina
- Species: C. rubrolineata

Binomial name
- Coryphellina rubrolineata O'Donoghue, 1929

Synonyms
- Flabellina rubrolineata (O'Donoghue, 1929)

= Coryphellina rubrolineata =

Species of gastropod

Coryphellina rubrolineata is a species of sea slug, an aeolid nudibranch, a marine heterobranch mollusc in the family Flabellinidae.

== Description ==
Coryphellina rubrolineata is a relatively large aeolid nudibranch growing to 42 mm in length. The stretched out body has a sharp end at the tail, the dorsal side is covered with a certain amount of extensions called cerata, which size vary from an animal to another. The rhinophores are pointed and look like feathers. The oral tentacles are thin, cylindrical and longer than the rhinophores. The coloration is variable and here's a description for the two main coloration which can be easily met underwater:

- The classic coloration: the body is milky white to translucent, three reddish to purple continuous or dotted lines are running on both side and in the middle of the body, oral tentacles and rhinophores are whitish with a mauve to purple ring at two-thirds of their extremity, cerata are also whitish with a purple ring and with orange tip.
- The purple coloration: whole body including cerata, rhinophores and oral tentacles are purple to mauve, without any continuous reddish line on the body but with just a darker ring at two-thirds of the cerata with clearest tips.

Many colour variations exist and it is likely that this species is really a species complex.

== Distribution & habitat ==
This species was described from the Red Sea. Coryphellina rubrolineata is thought to be widespread in tropical, subtropical and temperate waters in the Indo-Pacific area and also as a migrant species in the Mediterranean Sea. It is also commonly observed on shallow reef or rocky slopes rich in hydroids which represent its main diet.

== Biology ==
Like mainly all aeolids, Coryphellina rubrolineata has the ability to store the stinging cells from cnidarians eaten. This stinging cells stock is a particularly effective means of defense and is located at the ends of cerata, it is contained in cnidosacs.
