= Edmundsella vansyoci =

Scientific classification
- Kingdom: Animalia
- Phylum: Mollusca
- Class: Gastropoda
- Order: Nudibranchia
- Suborder: Aeolidacea
- Family: Flabellinidae
- Genus: Edmundsella
- Species: E. vansyoci

Binomial name
- Edmundsella vansyoci Gosliner, 1994

Species of gastropod

Edmundsella vansyoci is a species of sea slug, an aeolid nudibranch, a marine gastropod mollusc in the family Flabellinidae.

== Distribution ==
This species is reported from the Pacific coast of central America from Punta Eugenia, Baja California, Mexico to Costa Rica.

== Description ==
The body colour of Edmundsella vansyoci varies from pink to reddish pink. There are opaque white spots on the outer surfaces of the cerata. The rhinophores and oral tentacles are tinged with purple and have translucent tips. Externally Edmundsella vansyoci and Orienthella fogata can be separated by the location of the anus, which is in the middle of the inter-hepatic space in E. vansyoci and posterior, under the first or second post-hepatic ceras in O. fogata. These two species can also be distinguished by their cnidosacs, which are translucent white in O. fogata and pink in E. vansyoci. The maximum length of this species is 30 mm.

The description of Orienthella fogata includes a table comparing similar species from Mexico.

Species	Rhinophores	Ground colour	Colour of cerata	Living size (mm)
Flabellina marcusorum	Red, papillate posteriorly	Bright pink	Pink, purple and yellow	< 20
Samla telja	Yellow or brown, perfoliate	Light pink, white spots	Brownish pink	< 24
Edmundsella vansyoci	Pink, verrucose	Rose pink	Rose pink, white spots	< 15
Flabellina bertschi	White, smooth	White	Reddish pink, white tips	< 8
Orienthella fogata	Translucent orange, annulate	Translucent orange	Red with white spots	< 15
Kynaria cynara	White with purple tips, perfoliate	Pink with purple markings	Salmon & purple, white spots	< 12
