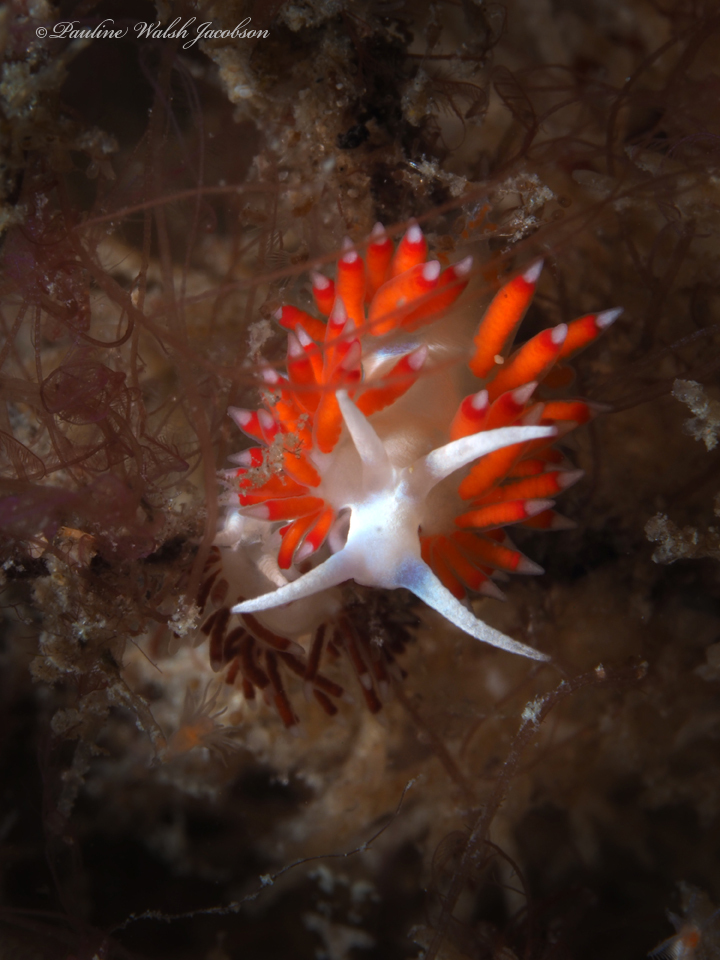

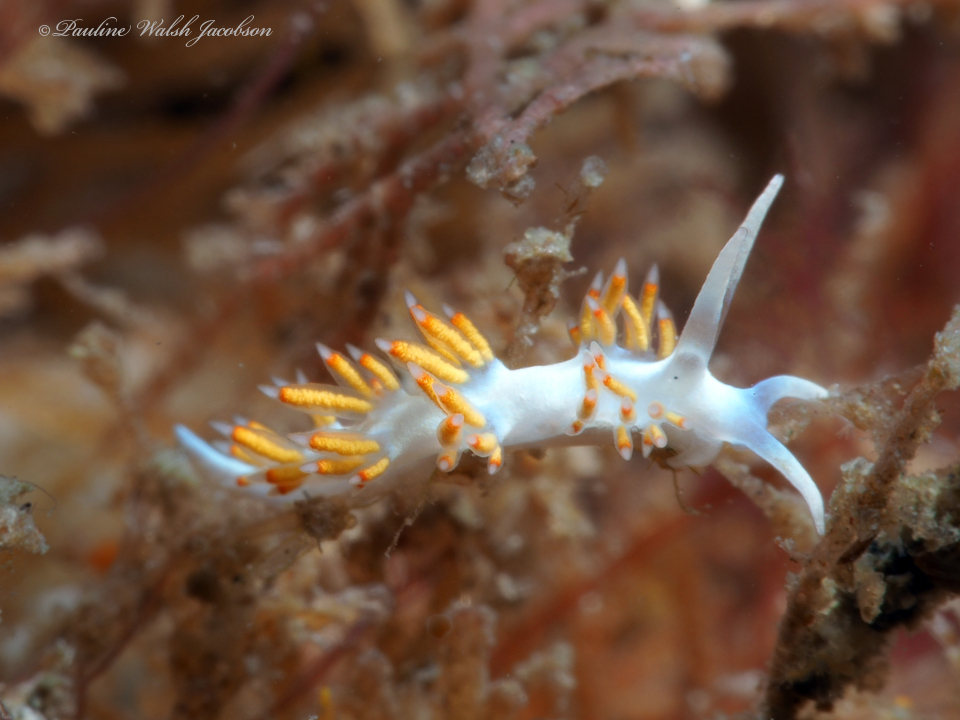

Scientific classification
- Kingdom: Animalia
- Phylum: Mollusca
- Class: Gastropoda
- Order: Nudibranchia
- Suborder: Aeolidacea
- Family: Flabellinidae
- Genus: Edmundsella
- Species: E. dushia

Binomial name
- Edmundsella dushia (Ev. Marcus & Er. Marcus, 1963)

Synonyms
- Coryphella dushia Ev. Marcus & Er. Marcus, 1963; Flabellina dushia (Ev. Marcus & Er. Marcus, 1963)

= Edmundsella dushia =

Species of gastropod

Edmundsella dushia is a species of sea slug, an aeolid nudibranch, a marine gastropod mollusc in the family Flabellinidae.

== Distribution ==
This species was described from the Caribbean Sea. It was later redescribed from new material from Martinique, the Bahamas and Florida. It has also been reported from the Canary Islands and Cape Verde Islands in the eastern Atlantic.

== Description ==
Edmundsella dushia is a flabellinid with opaque white pigment covering most of the body. The translucent body is visible through areas at the bases of the tentacles and rhinophores, behind the eyes and bases of the cerata. The rhinophores and oral tentacles are translucent at the base and covered with opaque white pigment in the outer two thirds. Mature animals reach 15 mm in length or up to 20 mm.

== Ecology ==
The minimum recorded depth for this species is 1 m; the maximum recorded depth is 20 m.
