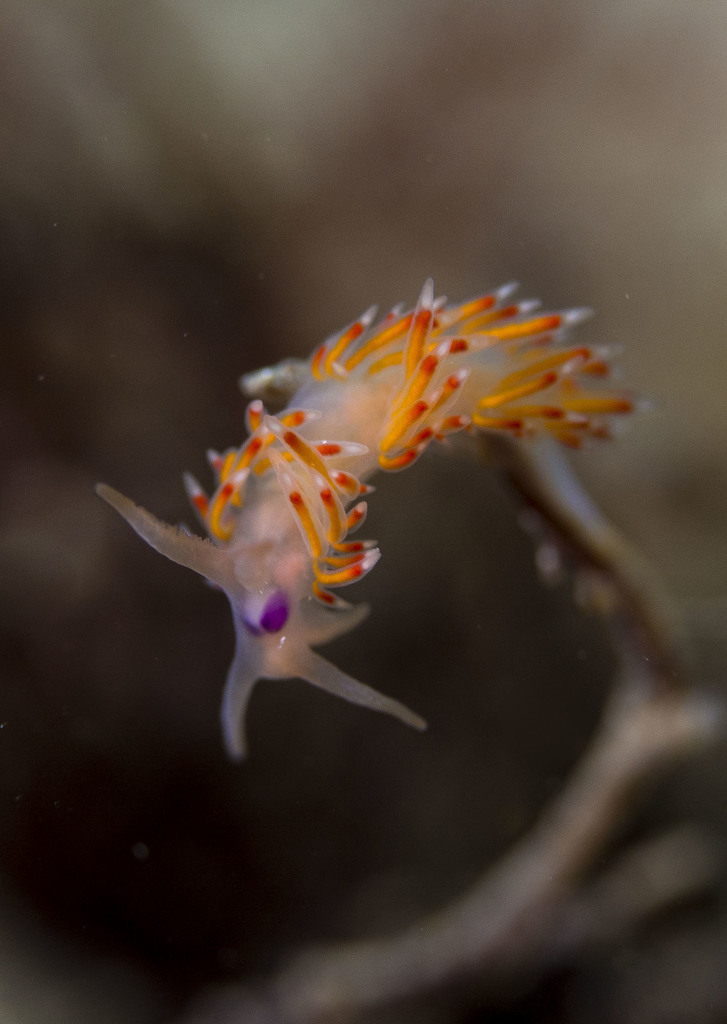

Scientific classification
- Kingdom: Animalia
- Phylum: Mollusca
- Class: Gastropoda
- Order: Nudibranchia
- Suborder: Aeolidacea
- Family: Flabellinidae
- Genus: Coryphellina
- Species: C. poenicia

Binomial name
- Coryphellina poenicia (Burn, 1957)

Synonyms
- Coryphellina poenicia Burn, 1957; Coryphellina poenicia aurantia Burn, 1962; Hervia poenicia Burn, 1957

= Coryphellina poenicia =

Species of gastropod

Coryphellina poenicia is a species of sea slug, an aeolid nudibranch, and a marine heterobranchia mollusc in the family Flabellinidae.

== Description ==
C. poenicia has a translucent body sometimes with a purplish tinge, and the jaw plates are visible within the head as two purple crescents. The cerata have a deep orange-red subapical band and the digestive gland is usually orange or yellow. The cnidosac is opaque white. The upper half of the rhinophores have papillae on the posterior side, though these can be absent in juveniles. It has a maximum length of 25mm.

== Distribution ==
The species is widely distributed in Southeastern Australia from New South Wales to South Australia.
