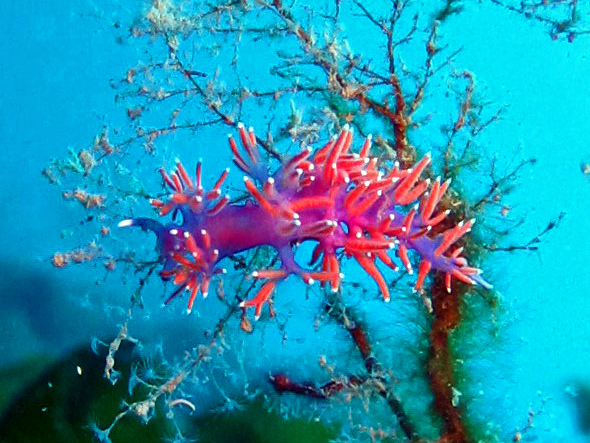
- Paraflabellina ischitana from Elba

Scientific classification
- Kingdom: Animalia
- Phylum: Mollusca
- Class: Gastropoda
- Order: Nudibranchia
- Suborder: Aeolidacea
- Family: Flabellinidae
- Genus: Paraflabellina; Korshunova, Martynov, Bakken, Evertsen, Fletcher, Mudianta, Saito, Lundin, Schrödl & Picton, 2017

Type species
- Paraflabellina ischitana (Hirano & Thompson, 1990)

= Paraflabellina =

Genus of gastropods

Paraflabellina is a genus of sea slugs, aeolid nudibranchs, marine gastropod mollusks in the family Flabellinidae.

== Species ==
There are four species within the genus Paraflabellina:

- Paraflabellina funeka (Gosliner & Griffiths, 1981)
- Paraflabellina gabinierei (Vicente, 1975)
- Paraflabellina ischitana (Hirano & Thompson, 1990)
- Paraflabellina rubromaxilla (Edmunds, 2015)
