= Edmundsella albomaculata =

Scientific classification
- Kingdom: Animalia
- Phylum: Mollusca
- Class: Gastropoda
- Order: Nudibranchia
- Suborder: Aeolidacea
- Family: Flabellinidae
- Genus: Edmundsella
- Species: E. albomaculata

Binomial name
- Edmundsella albomaculata (Pola, Carmona, Calado & Cervera, 2014)

Synonyms
- Flabellina albomaculata, Pola, Carmona, Calado & Cerveira, 2014

Species of gastropod

Edmundsella albomaculata is a species of sea slug, an aeolid nudibranch, a marine gastropod mollusc in the family Flabellinidae.

== Taxonomic history ==
First described as Flabellina albomaculata in 2014, it was placed in the new genus Edmundsella in 2017.

== Distribution ==
This species was described from São Vicente Island, Cape Verde Archipelago in the tropical Eastern Atlantic Ocean.

== Description ==
This flabellinid nudibranch has a violet body with spots of opaque white pigment on the surfaces of the cerata. The outer half of the rhinophores and oral tentacles are covered with white pigment. The rhinophores are smooth. Immature animals have been found to 12 mm in length.
