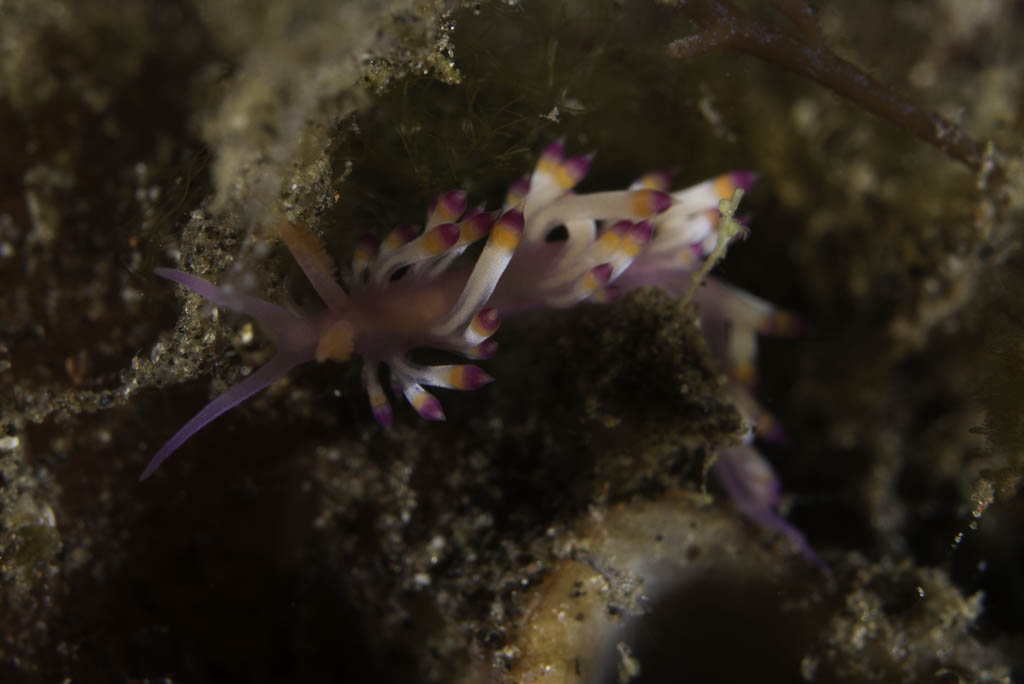
- The nudibranch Coryphellina delicata, Tulamben, Bali.

Scientific classification
- Kingdom: Animalia
- Phylum: Mollusca
- Class: Gastropoda
- Order: Nudibranchia
- Suborder: Aeolidacea
- Family: Flabellinidae
- Genus: Coryphellina; O'Donoghue, 1929

Type species
- Coryphellina rubrolineata O'Donoghue, 1929

= Coryphellina =

Genus of gastropods

Coryphellina is a genus of sea slugs, aeolid nudibranchs, marine gastropod mollusks in the family Flabellinidae.

== Species ==
The following species are within the genus Coryphellina:

- Coryphellina albomarginata (M. C. Miller, 1971)
- Coryphellina arveloi (Ortea & Espinosa, 1998)
- Coryphellina aurora Ekimova, Deart, Antokhina, Mikhlina & Schepetov, 2022
- Coryphellina cerverai (Fischer, van der Velde & Roubos, 2007)
- Coryphellina delicata (Gosliner & Willan, 1991)
- Coryphellina exoptata (Gosliner & Willan, 1991)
- Coryphellina flamma Ekimova, Deart, Antokhina, Mikhlina & Schepetov, 2022
- Coryphellina hamanni (Gosliner, 1994)
- Coryphellina indica (Bergh, 1902)
- Coryphellina iurmanovi Korshunova, Fletcher & Martynov, 2025
- Coryphellina lotos Korshunova, Martynov, Bakken, Evertsen, Fletcher, Mudianta, Saito, Lundin, Schrödl & Picton, 2017
- Coryphellina marcusorum (Gosliner & Kuzirian, 1990)
- Coryphellina pannae Ekimova, Deart, Antokhina, Mikhlina & Schepetov, 2022
- Coryphellina poenicia (Burn, 1957)
- Coryphellina pseudolotos Ekimova, Deart, Antokhina, Mikhlina & Schepetov, 2022
- Coryphellina rubrolineata O'Donoghue, 1929
- Coryphellina westralis (Burn, 1964)
