= Flabellina alternata =

Scientific classification
- Kingdom: Animalia
- Phylum: Mollusca
- Class: Gastropoda
- Order: Nudibranchia
- Suborder: Aeolidacea
- Family: Flabellinidae
- Genus: Flabellina
- Species: F. alternata

Binomial name
- Flabellina alternata Ortea & Espinosa, 1998

Species of gastropod

Flabellina alternata is a species of sea slug, an aeolid nudibranch, a marine gastropod mollusc in the family Flabellinidae.

== Distribution ==
This species was described from Morro de Beados, Bahía de Corimba, Angola.
