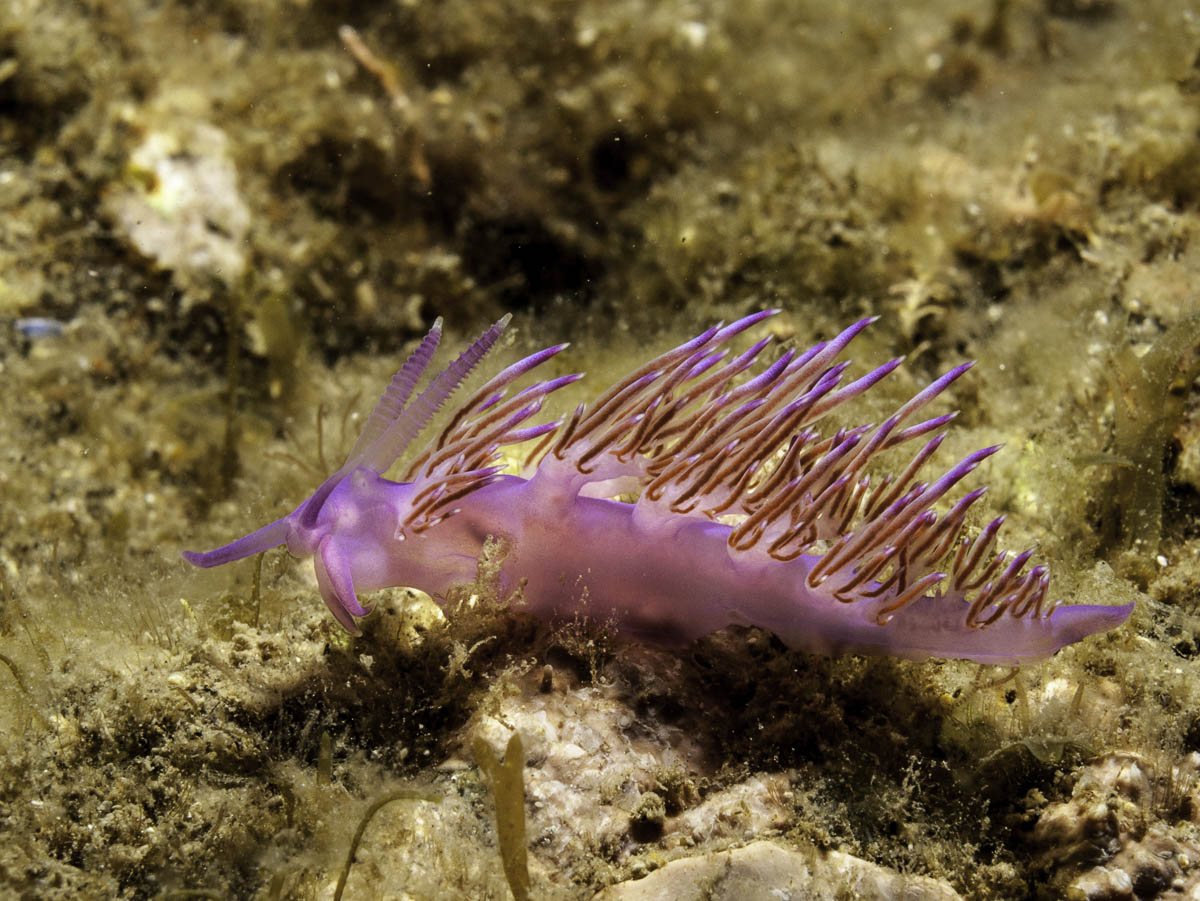
- The nudibranch Flabellina affinis, Banyuls-sur-Mer, France.

Scientific classification
- Kingdom: Animalia
- Phylum: Mollusca
- Class: Gastropoda
- Order: Nudibranchia
- Suborder: Aeolidacea
- Family: Flabellinidae
- Genus: Flabellina
- Species: F. affinis

Binomial name
- Flabellina affinis (Gmelin, 1791)

Synonyms
- Doris affinis Gmelin, 1791 (original combination)

= Flabellina affinis =

Species of gastropod

Flabellina affinis is a species of sea slug within the clade of aeolid nudibranch; a marine gastropod mollusk in the family Flabellinidae.

== Distribution ==
This species is found in depths to 50 m in European waters in the Atlantic Ocean from Portugal to Ghana and the Canaries and is widespread in the Mediterranean Sea.

== Description ==
The species can grow to a length of 50 mm. It feeds primarily on species of Eudendrium, a very common hydroid genus in the Mediterranean Sea.

Flabellina affinis is often confused with Paraflabellina ischitana, but can be distinguished as follows:

- Flabellina affinis: the outer part of the digestive gland in each ceras is not visible as the area beneath the subapical white ring is opaque violet in colour.
- Paraflabellina ischitana: the ceratal surface has no purple-violet colouration and is translucent.
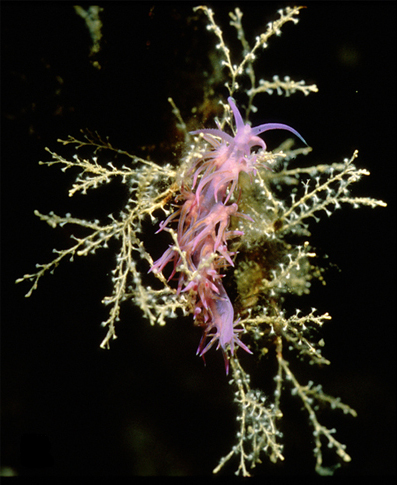
Flabellina affinis on its food Eudendrium racemosum
