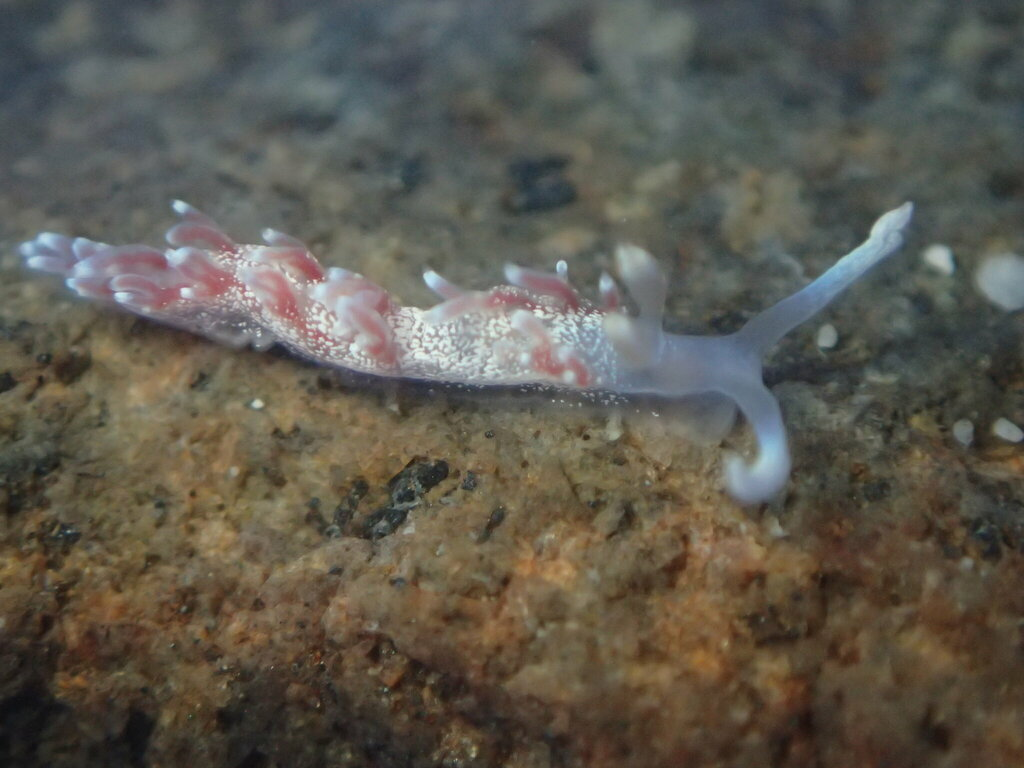

Scientific classification
- Kingdom: Animalia
- Phylum: Mollusca
- Class: Gastropoda
- Order: Nudibranchia
- Suborder: Aeolidacea
- Family: Samlidae
- Genus: Luisella
- Species: L. telja

Binomial name
- Luisella telja (Marcus & Marcus, 1967)

Synonyms
- Flabellina stohleri Bertsch & Ferreira, 1974; Flabellina telja Marcus & Marcus, 1967; Samla telja (Ev. Marcus & Er. Marcus, 1967)

= Luisella telja =

Species of gastropod

Luisella telja is a species of sea slug, an aeolid nudibranch, a marine heterobranch mollusc in the family Samlidae.

== Distribution ==
This species occurs from the Gulf of California and the Pacific coast of Mexico to Panama.

== Description ==
Luisella telja is a flabellinid nudibranch with a translucent white body with a strong rose-pink hue. It has opaque white spots over the surfaces of the cerata and the back of the body and the sides of the foot.

The description of Orienthella fogata includes a table comparing similar species from Mexico.

Species	Rhinophores	Ground colour	Colour of cerata	Living size (mm)
Coryphellina marcusorum	Red, papillate posteriorly	Bright pink	Pink, purple and yellow	< 20
Samla telja	Yellow or brown, perfoliate	Light pink, white spots	Brownish pink	< 24
Edmundsella vansyoci	Pink, verrucose	Rose pink	Rose pink, white spots	< 15
Flabellina bertschi	White, smooth	White	Reddish pink, white tips	< 8
Orienthella fogata	Translucent orange, annulate	Translucent orange	Red with white spots	< 15
Kynaria cynara	White with purple tips, perfoliate	Pink with purple markings	Salmon & purple, white spots	< 12
