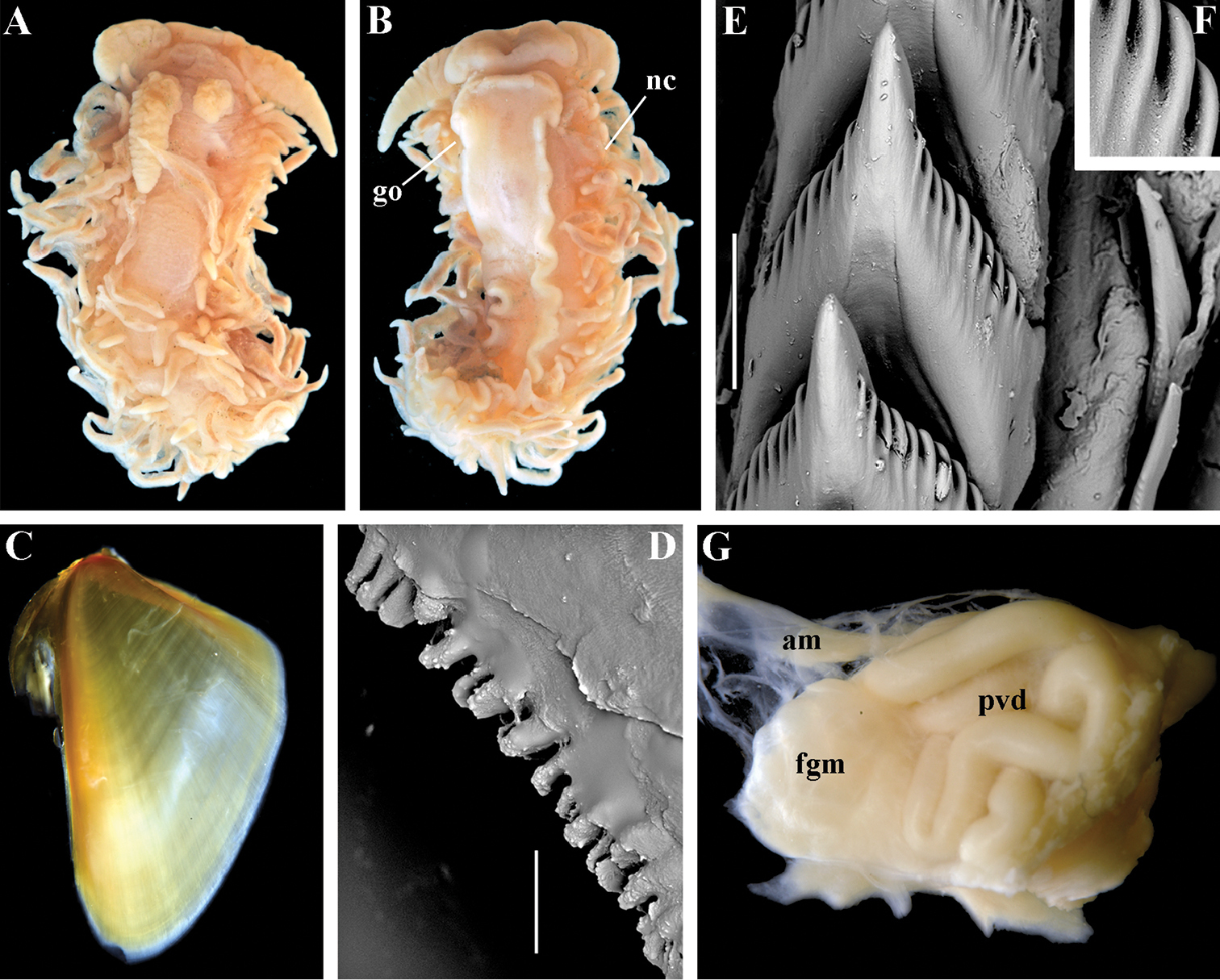

Scientific classification
- Kingdom: Animalia
- Phylum: Mollusca
- Class: Gastropoda
- Order: Nudibranchia
- Suborder: Aeolidacea
- Family: Flabellinidae
- Genus: Ziminella
- Species: Z. japonica

Binomial name
- Ziminella japonica (Volodchenko, 1937)

Synonyms
- Coryphella japonica Volodchenko, 1941; Flabellina japonica (Volodchenko, 1941)

= Ziminella japonica =

Species of gastropod

Ziminella japonica is a species of sea slug, an aeolid nudibranch, a marine heterobranch mollusc in the family Paracoryphellidae.

== Description ==
Z. japonica can grow up to a maximum length of 75 mm (3.0 in) and ceratal color varies from cream to yellow, orange and pink.

== Distribution ==
This species is widely distributed throughout British Columbia, Alaska, Japan, Siberia and Atlantic Canada to Massachusetts.
