= Flabellina evelinae =

Scientific classification
- Domain: Eukaryota
- Kingdom: Animalia
- Phylum: Mollusca
- Class: Gastropoda
- Order: Nudibranchia
- Suborder: Cladobranchia
- Superfamily: Fionoidea
- Family: Flabellinidae
- Genus: Flabellina
- Species: F. evelinae

Binomial name
- Flabellina evelinae Edmunds, 1989

Species of gastropod

Flabellina evelinae is a species of sea slug, an aeolid nudibranch, a marine gastropod mollusc in the family Flabellinidae.

== Distribution ==
This species was described from Nigeria.
