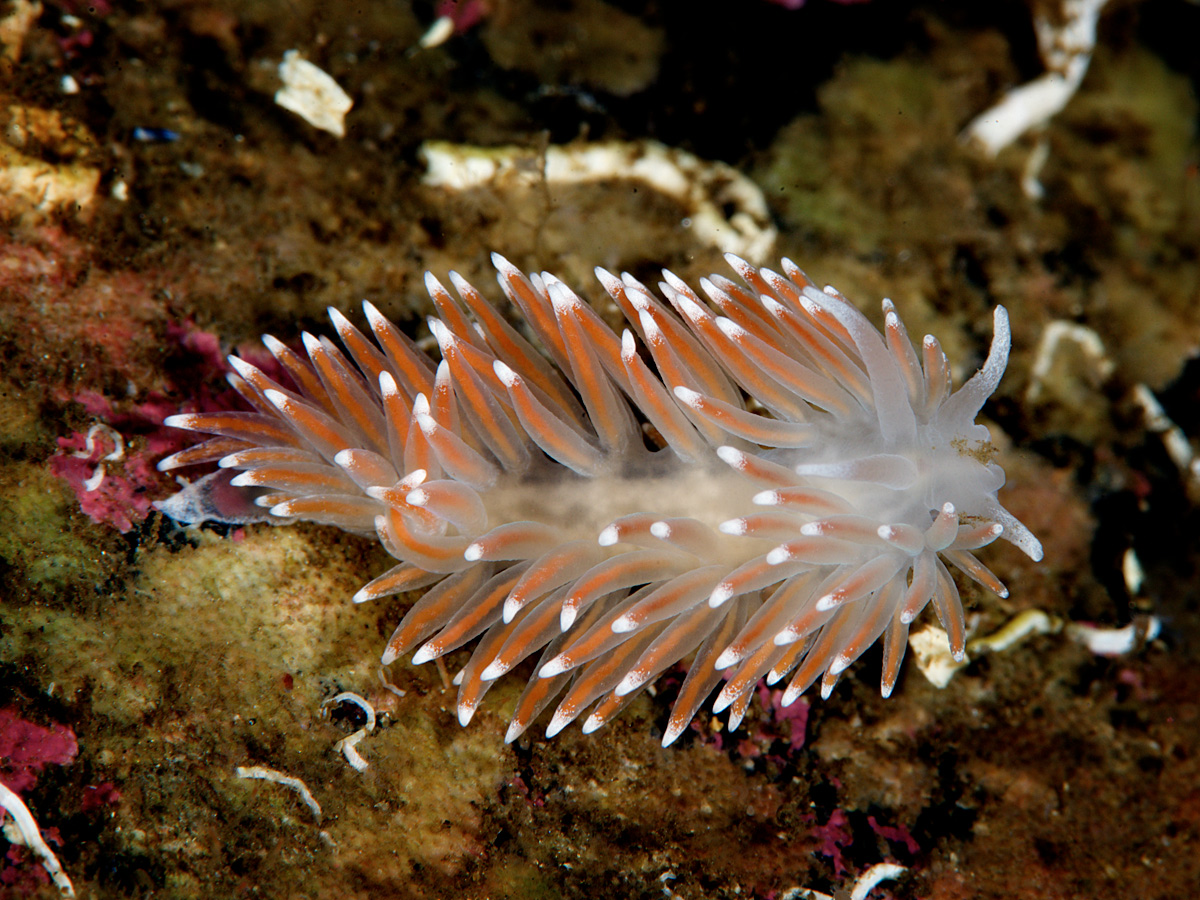
- Carronella pellucida

Scientific classification
- Kingdom: Animalia
- Phylum: Mollusca
- Class: Gastropoda
- Order: Nudibranchia
- Suborder: Aeolidacea
- Family: Flabellinidae
- Genus: Carronella; Korshunova, Martynov, Bakken, Evertsen, Fletcher, Mudianta, Saito, Lundin, Schrödl & Picton, 2017

Type species
- Carronella pellucida (Alder & Hancock, 1843)

= Carronella =

Genus of gastropods

Carronella is a genus of sea slugs, aeolid nudibranchs, marine gastropod mollusks in the family Flabellinidae.

== Species ==
There are two species within the genus Carronella:

- Carronella enne Korshunova, Martynov, Bakken, Evertsen, Fletcher, Mudianta, Saito, Lundin, Schrödl & Picton, 2017
- Carronella pellucida (Alder & Hancock, 1843)
