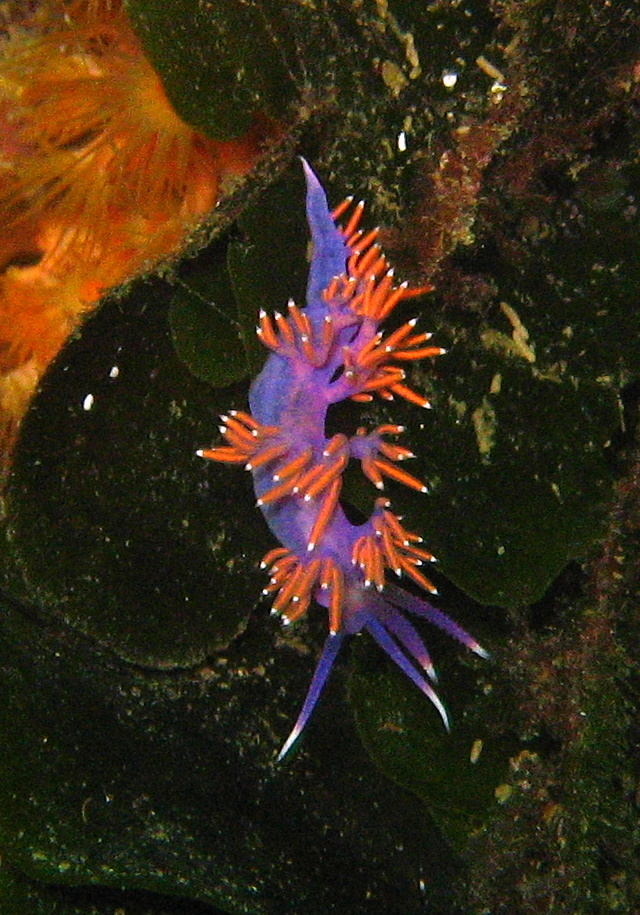

Scientific classification
- Kingdom: Animalia
- Phylum: Mollusca
- Class: Gastropoda
- Order: Nudibranchia
- Suborder: Aeolidacea
- Family: Flabellinidae
- Genus: Flabellina
- Species: F. ischitana

Binomial name
- Flabellina ischitana Hirano & Thompson, 1990

Synonyms
- Paraflabellina ischitana (Y. Hirano & T. E. Thompson, 1990)

= Flabellina ischitana =

Species of gastropod

Flabellina ischitana is a species of sea slug, an aeolid nudibranch, a marine gastropod mollusk in the family Flabellinidae.

== Etymology ==
The name ischitana means from Ischia, the island from where this nudibranch was first named.

== Distribution ==
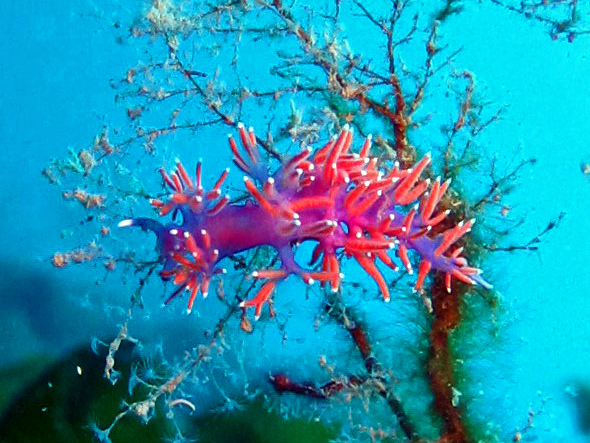
Flabellina ischitana from Elba

This species is found in Mediterranean waters around Spain in such locations as Costa Brava, and in the Tyrrhenian Sea, especially around Ischia (hence the species Latin name).

== Habitat ==
Flabellina ischitana usually can be found in shallow water, but it can also reach depths of 35 m.

== Description ==
This species can grow to a length of approximately 4 cm and is mostly purple-violet in colour. It has opaque white-tipped certa, rhinophores, and oral tentacles. The rhinophores are annulate. Due to the somewhat transparent skin of the ceras, the branches of the digestive gland are visible, and appear as red-orange.

== Similar species ==
Flabellina ischitana is often confused with Flabellina affinis, but can be distinguished as follows:

- Flabellina ischitana: the ceratal surface has no purple-violet colouration and is translucent;
- Flabellina affinis: the digestive gland is not visible as the area beneath the subapical white ring is opaque;

Flabellina ischitana is also similar to Edmundsella pedata, but they can be distinguished on the basis of their rhinophores:

- Paraflabellina ischitana has annulate rhinophores.
- Edmundsella pedata has smooth rhinophores.

== Biology ==
This nudibranch likely eats hydroids of the genus Eudendrium (Eudendrium racemosum and Eudendrium glomeratum) as its main food source.

Like other nudibranchs, this species is hermaphrodite. Mating occurs in late spring. The egg case is whitish or reddish, with thousands of eggs of about 70 microns. The nudibranch places the egg case on the branches of hydrozoa.

== Bibliography ==
- Egidio Trainito, Nudibranchi del Mediterraneo. Guida al riconoscimento dei molluschi opistobranchi, 2005ª ed., Milano, Il Castello, 2005, ISBN 88-8039-438-X.
- Gary R. McDonald, University of California Santa Cruz - Nudibranch Systematic Index, University of California Santa Cruz - Institute of Marine Sciences
