= Flabellina ilidioi =

Scientific classification
- Kingdom: Animalia
- Phylum: Mollusca
- Class: Gastropoda
- Order: Nudibranchia
- Suborder: Aeolidacea
- Family: Flabellinidae
- Genus: Flabellina
- Species: F. ilidioi

Binomial name
- Flabellina ilidioi Calado, Ortea & Caballer, 2005

Species of gastropod

Flabellina ilidioi is a species of sea slug, an aolid nudibranch, a marine gastropod mollusk in the family Flabellinidae.
