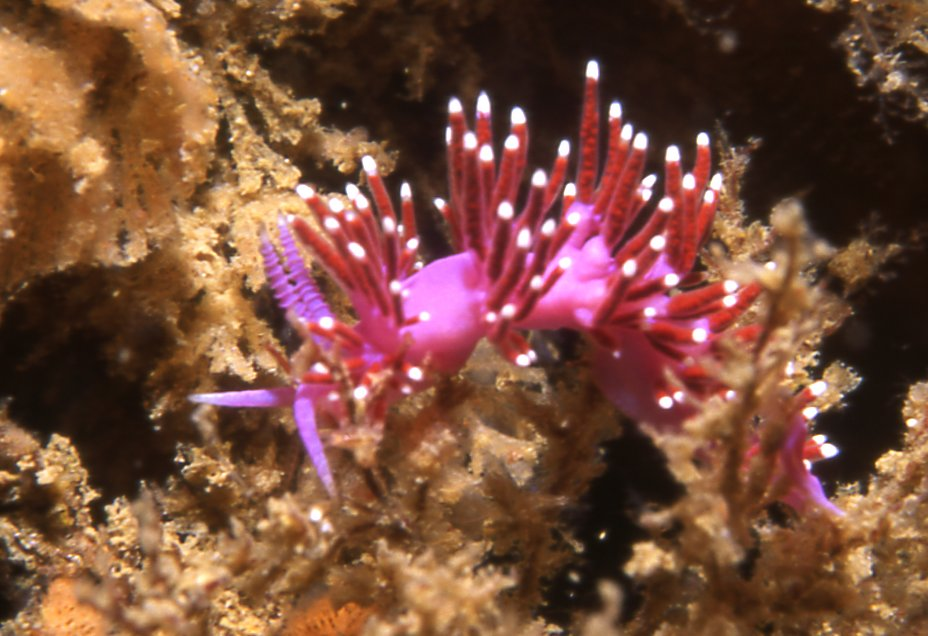

Scientific classification
- Kingdom: Animalia
- Phylum: Mollusca
- Class: Gastropoda
- Order: Nudibranchia
- Suborder: Aeolidacea
- Family: Flabellinidae
- Genus: Flabellina
- Species: F. funeka

Binomial name
- Flabellina funeka Gosliner & Griffiths, 1981

Synonyms
- Paraflabellina funeka (Gosliner & Griffiths, 1981)

= Flabellina funeka =

Purple lady Flabellina funeka

Species of gastropod

The purple lady nudibranch, Flabellina funeka, is a species of aeolid nudibranch, and is a very colourful sea slug. It is a marine gastropod mollusc in the family Flabellinidae.

== Distribution ==
This species is endemic to the South African coast and is found only from Cape Point to Port Elizabeth in 5–30 m of water.

== Description ==
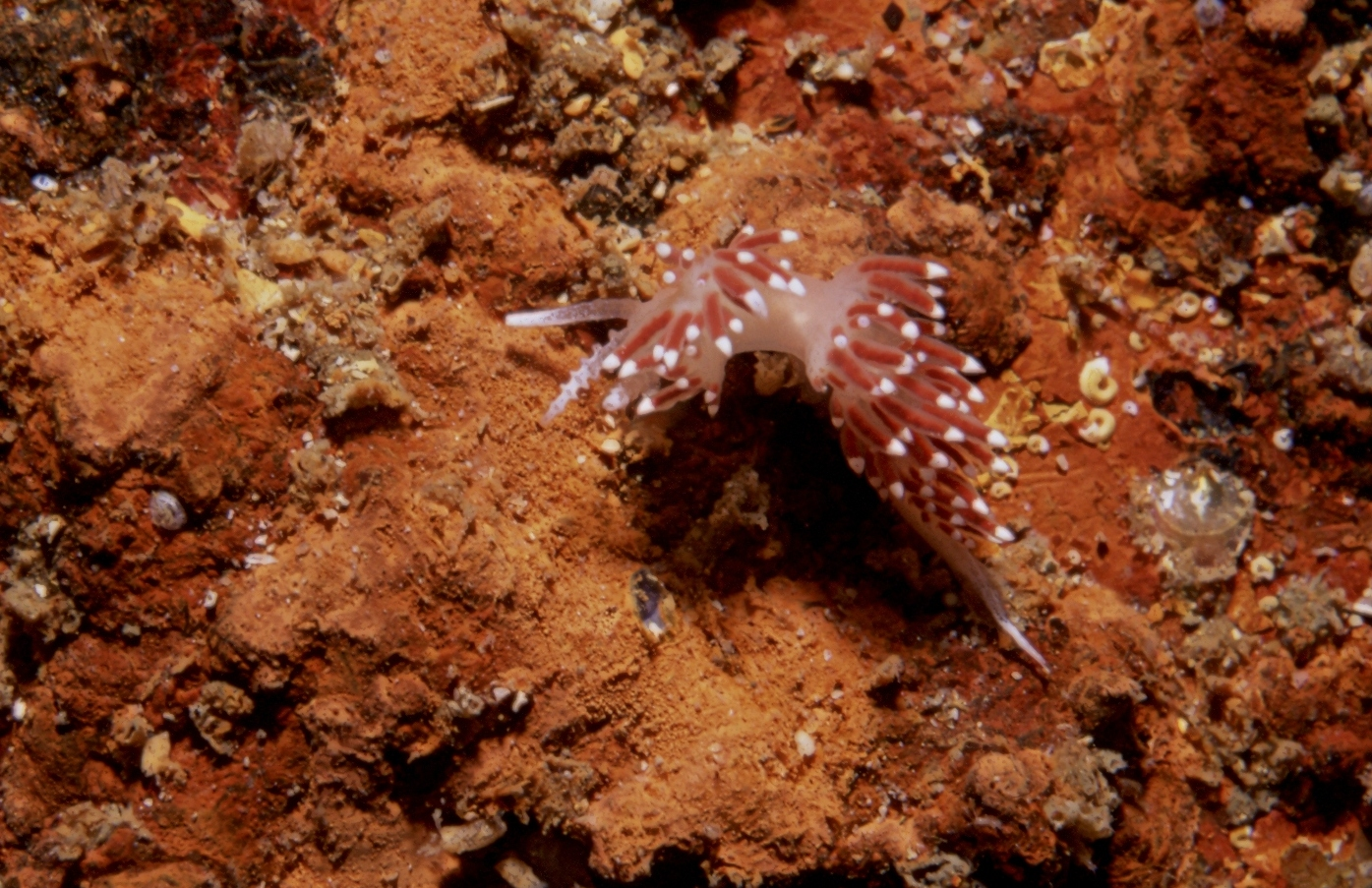
The white-bodied form of the purple lady nudibranch

The purple lady is a slender purple-bodied aeolid with red cerata having white tips. It is usually smaller than 45 mm. It has annulate purple rhinophores with pale tips. It has a pair of pale-tipped oral tentacles which are shorter than the rhinophores. It may also be seen in a white-bodied form, but the red cerata and annulate rhinophores are distinctive.

== Ecology ==
This aeolid feeds on hydroids of the genus Eudendrium. In common with other aeolid nudibranchs, the cerata of the purple lady aid in respiration but also contain extensions of the digestive system. The purple lady eats the hydroid and passes its nematocysts unharmed through its digestive system to the tips of its cerata. Here the nematocysts mature and are then used by the nudibranch for its own defence. It is probable that the bright colours of the purple lady serve to advertise to predators that it is toxic.

Despite their common name, purple ladies are hermaphrodites. Their egg mass is highly convoluted and white.
