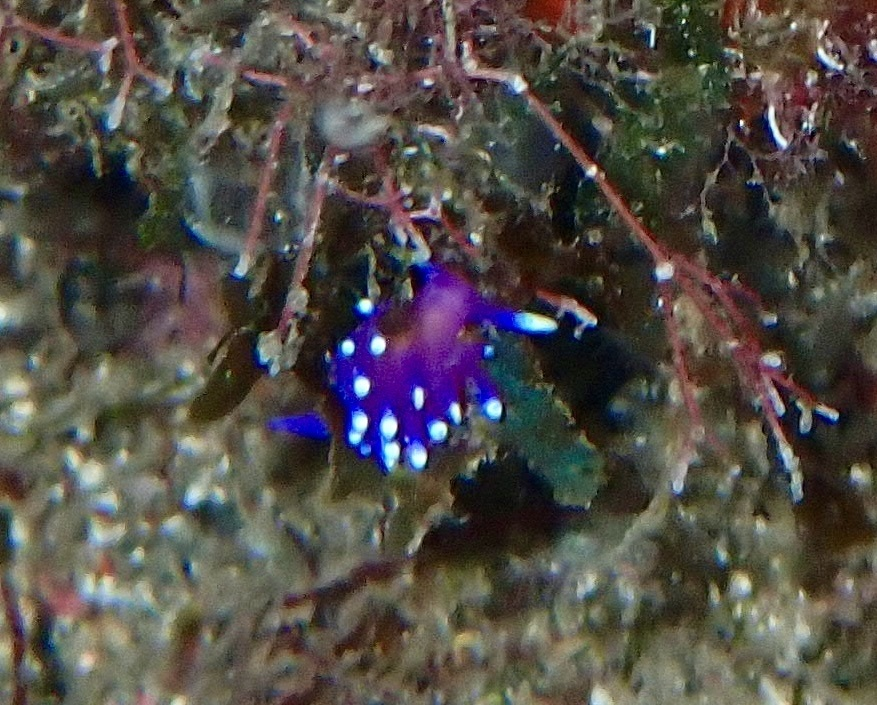

Scientific classification
- Kingdom: Animalia
- Phylum: Mollusca
- Class: Gastropoda
- Order: Nudibranchia
- Suborder: Aeolidacea
- Family: Flabellinidae
- Genus: Coryphellina
- Species: C. arveloi

Binomial name
- Coryphellina arveloi (Ortea & Espinosa, 1998)

Synonyms
- Flabellina arveloi Ortea & Espinosa, 1998

= Coryphellina arveloi =

Species of gastropod

Coryphellina arveloi is a species of sea slug, an aeolid nudibranch, a marine gastropod mollusc in the family Flabellinidae.

== Distribution ==
This species was described from the island of Boa Vista, Cape Verde, Africa.

== See also ==
- Flabellina marcusorum, a similar species
