= Coryphella fogata =

Scientific classification
- Kingdom: Animalia
- Phylum: Mollusca
- Class: Gastropoda
- Order: Nudibranchia
- Suborder: Aeolidacea
- Family: Coryphellidae
- Genus: Coryphella
- Species: C. fogata

Binomial name
- Coryphella fogata (Millen & Hermosillo, 2007)

Synonyms
- Flabellina fogata Millen & Hermosillo, 2007; Orienthella fogata (Millen & Hermosillo, 2007)

Species of gastropod

Coryphella fogata is a species of sea slug, an aeolid nudibranch, a marine gastropod mollusk in the family Coryphellidae.

== Distribution ==
This species was described from Bahía de Banderas, Mexico, Pacific Ocean.

== Description ==
This nudibranch has a translucent orange body and red digestive gland in the cerata. There are white spots on the outer parts of the cerata.

The description of Coryphellidae includes a table comparing similar species from Mexico.

Species	Rhinophores	Ground colour	Colour of cerata	Living size (mm)
Coryphellina marcusorum	Red, papillate posteriorly	Bright pink	Pink, purple and yellow	< 20
Samla telja	Yellow or brown, perfoliate	Light pink, white spots	Brownish pink	< 24
Edmundsella vansyoci	Pink, verrucose	Rose pink	Rose pink, white spots	< 15
Flabellina bertschii	White, smooth	White	Reddish pink, white tips	< 8
Coryphella fogata	Translucent orange, annulate	Translucent orange	Red with white spots	< 15
Kynaria cynara	White with purple tips, perfoliate	Pink with purple markings	Salmon & purple, white spots	< 12
