= Coryphella dana =

Scientific classification
- Kingdom: Animalia
- Phylum: Mollusca
- Class: Gastropoda
- Order: Nudibranchia
- Suborder: Aeolidacea
- Family: Flabellinidae
- Genus: Coryphella
- Species: C. dana

Binomial name
- Coryphella dana (Millen & Hamann, 2006)

Synonyms
- Flabellina dana Millen & Hamann, 2006

Species of gastropod

Coryphella dana is a species of sea slug, an aeolid nudibranch, a marine gastropod mollusc in the family Flabellinidae.

Ekimova et al. (2026) placed it within Coryphella provisionally based upon morphological analysis, believing molecular data is needed to confirm or otherwise clarify its placement.

== Distribution ==
This species was described from the Caribbean Sea. It has also been reported from Florida.
