= Coryphella pallida =

Scientific classification
- Kingdom: Animalia
- Phylum: Mollusca
- Class: Gastropoda
- Order: Nudibranchia
- Suborder: Aeolidacea
- Family: Flabellinidae
- Genus: Coryphella
- Species: C. pallida

Binomial name
- Coryphella pallida A. E. Verrill, 1900

Synonyms
- Flabellina pallida (A. E. Verrill, 1900)

Species of gastropod

Coryphella pallida is a species of sea slug, an aeolid nudibranch, a marine heterobranch mollusc in the family Flabellinidae.

== Taxonomic Status ==
Ekimova et al. considers the placement of C. pallida under Coryphella as provisional, believing further study is needed to confirm or otherwise clarify its placement. Korshunova et al. regards C. pallida as nomen dubium, believing it is necessary to fully exclude C. pallida from Coryphellidae sensu Korshunova et al. (2025) as there has never been any indication it belonged there in the first place.

== Description ==
C. pallida has a maximum length of 10mm. The original 1900 description by A. E. Verrill is brief:

"Body small, slender, dorsal papillæ long, slender, in two series of lateral clusters, numerous, not crowded, usually curved. Rhinophores elongated, tapered, slightly plicated, light yellow. Foot narrow, its anterior lobes much prolounged, slender, acute, usually curved back. Body white; dorsal papillæ dark gray with white tips."[1]

The description was entitled "Coryphella (?) pallida, sp. nov.", indicating that Verrill was not confident on its placement within Coryphella. No illustrations nor details on internal anatomy were included. Verrill writes the description was based upon only a single specimen. The location of the type material is unknown, if it exists at all.

== Distribution ==
This species is distributed in the western Pacific Ocean, primarily in Bermuda.
