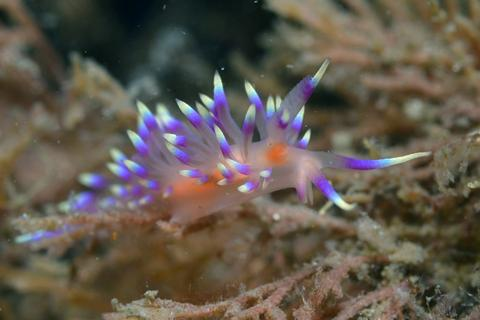

Scientific classification
- Kingdom: Animalia
- Phylum: Mollusca
- Class: Gastropoda
- Order: Nudibranchia
- Suborder: Aeolidacea
- Family: Flabellinidae
- Genus: Coryphellina
- Species: C. marcusorum

Binomial name
- Coryphellina marcusorum (Gosliner & Kuzirian, 1990)

Synonyms
- Coryphellina rubrolineata auct. non O'Donoghue, 1929; Flabellina marcusorum Gosliner & Kuzirian, 1990

= Coryphellina marcusorum =

Species of gastropod

Coryphellina marcusorum, (Spanish common name: Eolidáceo de Marcus) is a species of sea slug, an aeolid nudibranch, a marine gastropod mollusc in the family Flabellinidae.

== Distribution ==
This species was described from Isla San Diego, Baja California, Mexico. Coryphellina marcusorum is thought to occur in two disjunct populations in the waters of central and south America: one group on the west coast of central America in the eastern Pacific Ocean and as far east as the Galapagos Islands and the other on the east side of the continent in the Caribbean Sea and in the western Atlantic Ocean down to Brazil.

== Description ==
Coryphellina marcusorum has a mainly translucent pink or orange body colour. The elongate rhinophores, foot corners and cerata are tipped with opaque white (or sometimes opaque yellow), with a broad, purple band beneath. The posterior face of the rhinophores may have up to one hundred papillae. The oral tentacles are elongate and thin, and are longer than the rhinophores.

The maximum recorded body length is 25 mm or up to 30 mm.

This species is very similar in colouration to the recently described African species Coryphellina arveloi. A comparison with other Flabellinidae species from Mexico is given in the description of Orienthella fogata.

Species	Rhinophores	Ground colour	Colour of cerata	Living size (mm)
Coryphellina marcusorum	Red, papillate posteriorly	Bright pink	Pink, purple and yellow	< 20
Samla telja	Yellow or brown, perfoliate	Light pink, white spots	Brownish pink	< 24
Edmundsella vansyoci	Pink, verrucose	Rose pink	Rose pink, white spots	< 15
Flabellina bertschi	White, smooth	White	Reddish pink, white tips	< 8
Orienthella fogata	Translucent orange, annulate	Translucent orange	Red with white spots	< 15
Kynaria cynara	White with purple tips, perfoliate	Pink with purple markings	Salmon & purple, white spots	< 12

== Habitat ==
Minimum recorded depth is 3 m. Maximum recorded depth is 22 m.
