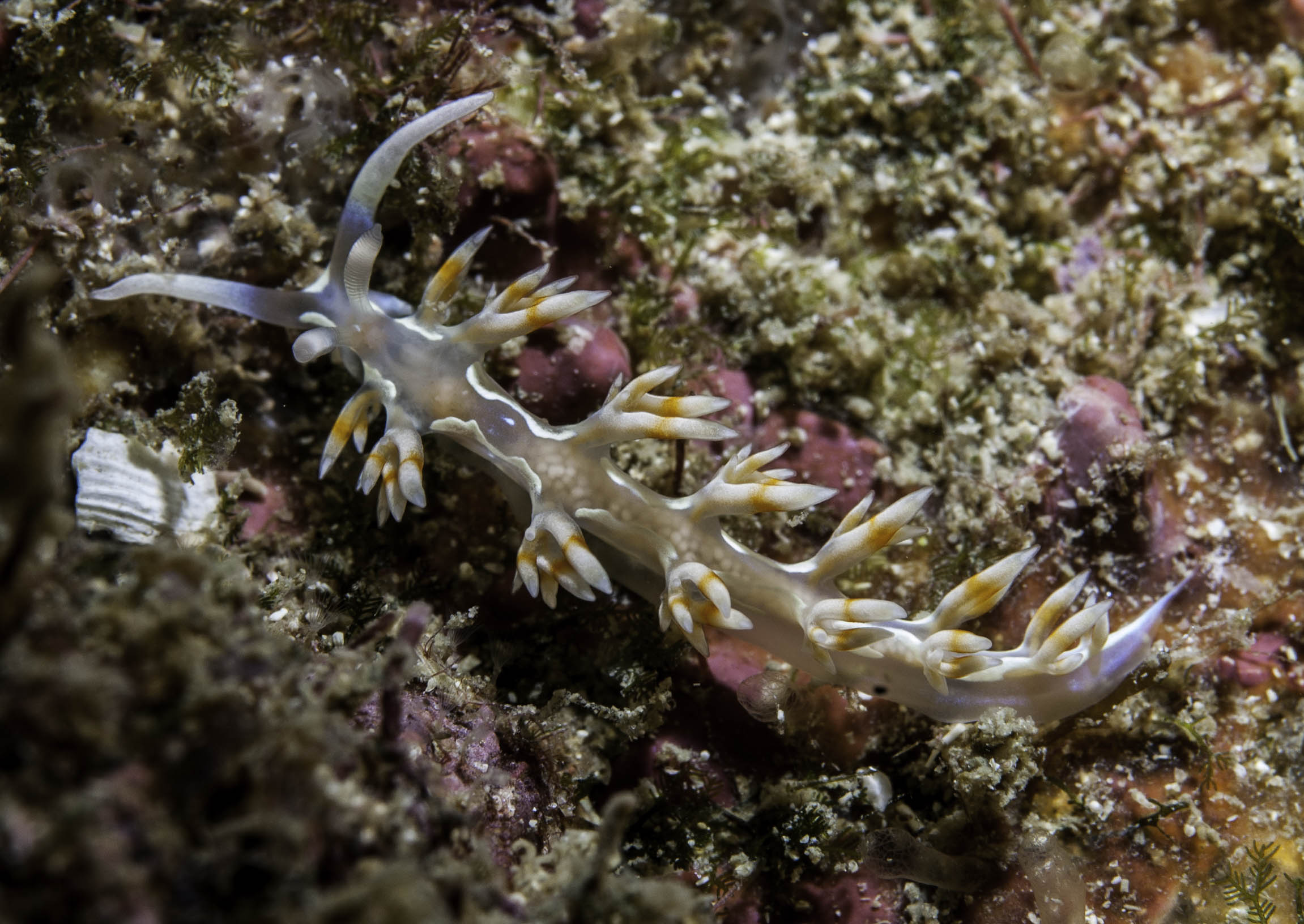
- The nudibranch Luisella engeli lucianae, Cabo Frio, Brazil.

Scientific classification
- Kingdom: Animalia
- Phylum: Mollusca
- Class: Gastropoda
- Order: Nudibranchia
- Suborder: Aeolidacea
- Family: Samlidae
- Genus: Luisella
- Species: L. engeli

Binomial name
- Luisella engeli (Ev. Marcus & Er. Marcus, 1968)

Synonyms
- Flabellina engeli Ev. Marcus & Er. Marcus, 1968

= Luisella engeli =

Species of gastropod

Luisella engeli is a species of sea slug, an aeolid nudibranch, a marine gastropod mollusc in the family Samlidae.

== Subspecies ==
A subspecies has been described from colder water in Brazil as Flabellina engeli lucianae Dacosta, Cunha, Simone & Schrödl, 2007.

== Distribution ==
This species was described from Curaçao. It has been reported from Tobago, Florida, Costa Rica, Colombia, Venezuela, Barbados, Cuba, Puerto Rico, Curaçao, St. Lucia, Martinique, Granada, Brazil and Panama.

== Description ==
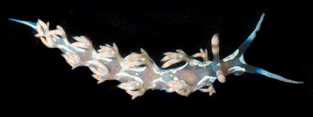
dorsal view of Luisella engeli

Body is elongate, narrowing posteriorly. Rhinophores are lamellate, club-shaped and with white bands. Cerata are arranged into clusters in two rows along the dorsum. Background color is translucent gray with thick white or yellow patches running between the cerata clusters, on the margin of the dorsum. A submarginal row of opaque white spots present along the sides of the body. Three white or yellow patches are on the head. Oral tentacles are long, translucent and white at the tips. Cerata are translucent with a brown or orange band about a third of the way down from the tip. The maximum recorded body length is 25 mm.

== Ecology ==
One specimen was found on a living blade of sea grass in 1 m of water in Panama. Minimum recorded depth is 1 m. Maximum recorded depth is 2 m.
