= Coryphella californica =

Scientific classification
- Kingdom: Animalia
- Phylum: Mollusca
- Class: Gastropoda
- Order: Nudibranchia
- Suborder: Aeolidacea
- Family: Flabellinidae
- Genus: Coryphella
- Species: C. californica

Binomial name
- Coryphella californica Bergh, 1904

Synonyms
- Flabellina californica (Bergh, 1904)

Species of gastropod

Coryphella californica is a species of sea slug, an aeolid nudibranch, a marine gastropod mollusc in the family Flabellinidae.

Ekimova et al. (2026) states that more data is needed to confirm its placement in Coryphella. Korshunova et al. (2025), however, cautiously proposes that Coryphella californica is in fact a junior synonym of Flabellinopsis iodinea; the description of the preserved and therefore somewhat distorted specimen of C. californica does not contradict the original description of F. iodinea in any meaningful way, and shares with it some similarities, while not sharing any similarities with Coryphellids.

== Distribution ==
This species was described from California. It does not seem to have been recognised since the original description.
