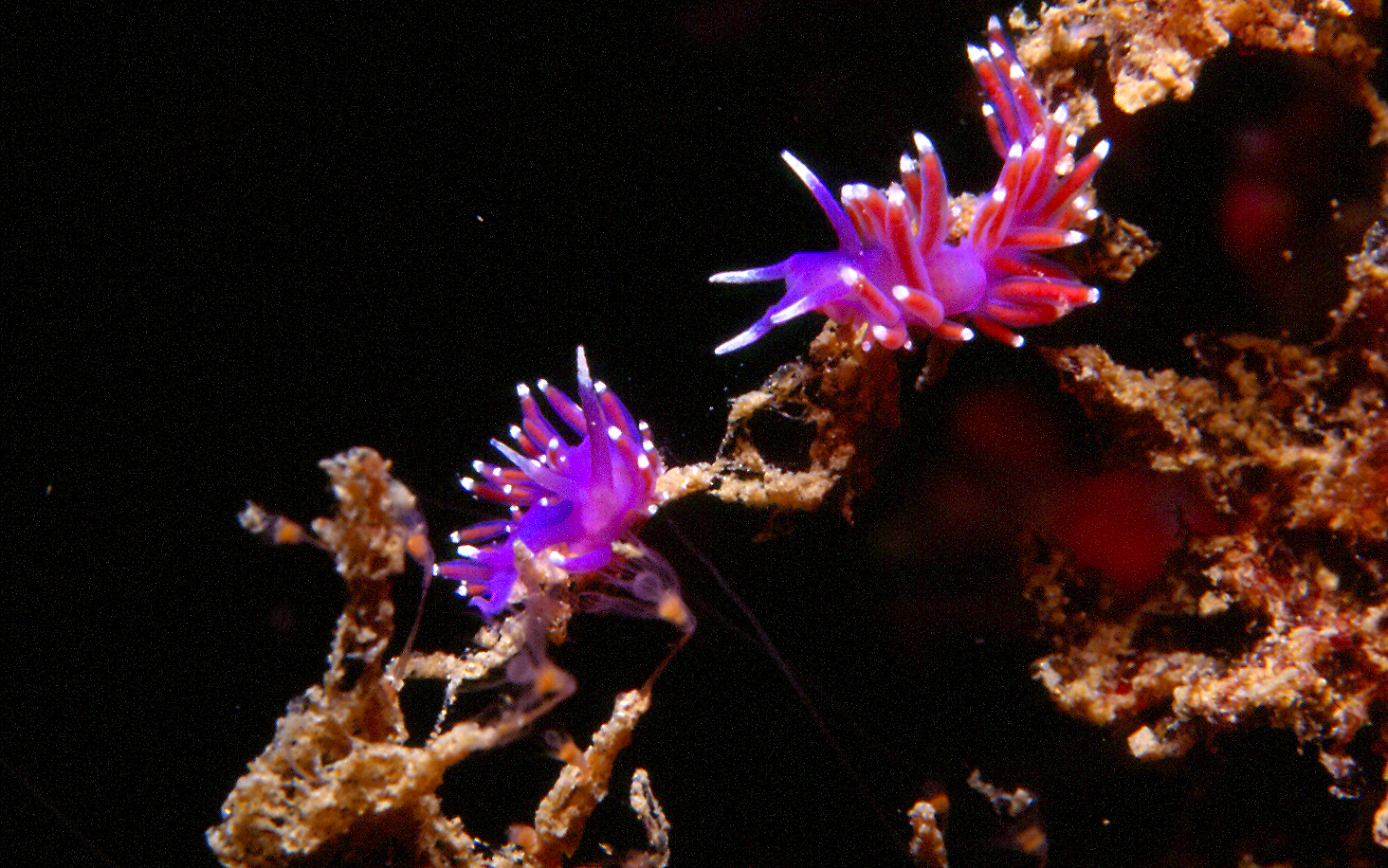

Scientific classification
- Domain: Eukaryota
- Kingdom: Animalia
- Phylum: Mollusca
- Class: Gastropoda
- Order: Nudibranchia
- Suborder: Cladobranchia
- Superfamily: Fionoidea
- Family: Flabellinidae
- Genus: Edmundsella
- Species: E. pedata

Binomial name
- Edmundsella pedata (Montagu, 1815)

Synonyms
- Doris pedata Montagu, 1816; Coryphella pedata (Montagu, 1815); Coryphella landsburgii (Alder & Hancock, 1846); Eolis landsburgii Alder & Hancock, 1846; Flabellina pedata (Montagu, 1815)

= Edmundsella pedata =

Species of gastropod

Edmundsella pedata is a species of sea slug, an aeolid nudibranch, a marine gastropod mollusc in the family Flabellinidae.

== Description ==
This species has a distinctive pink-purple coloration over its entire body. In the Mediterranean it can grow to about 20 mm long, while specimens in the Atlantic Ocean may grow to 50 mm. The cerata have white rings at the tip and occur in bunches which are joined together at their bases. The extremities are an opaque white in colour. Normally, the digestive gland is red.

== Distribution ==
Edmundsella pedata is found as far north as Trøndelag, Norway, around the entire British Isles, and down to the Mediterranean. Although it is a common species, it is seldom found in abundance.

== Habitat ==
This species occurs, often solitary or in pairs, in sublittoral areas on hard substrate such as somewhat exposed rocky surfaces.

== Diet ==
This sea slug eats Eudendrium (a kind of Hydrozoa). The exact species has been unclear, but in Denmark it is reportedly E. ramosum. It also lays a thin white egg ribbon or thread on the Eudendrium.
