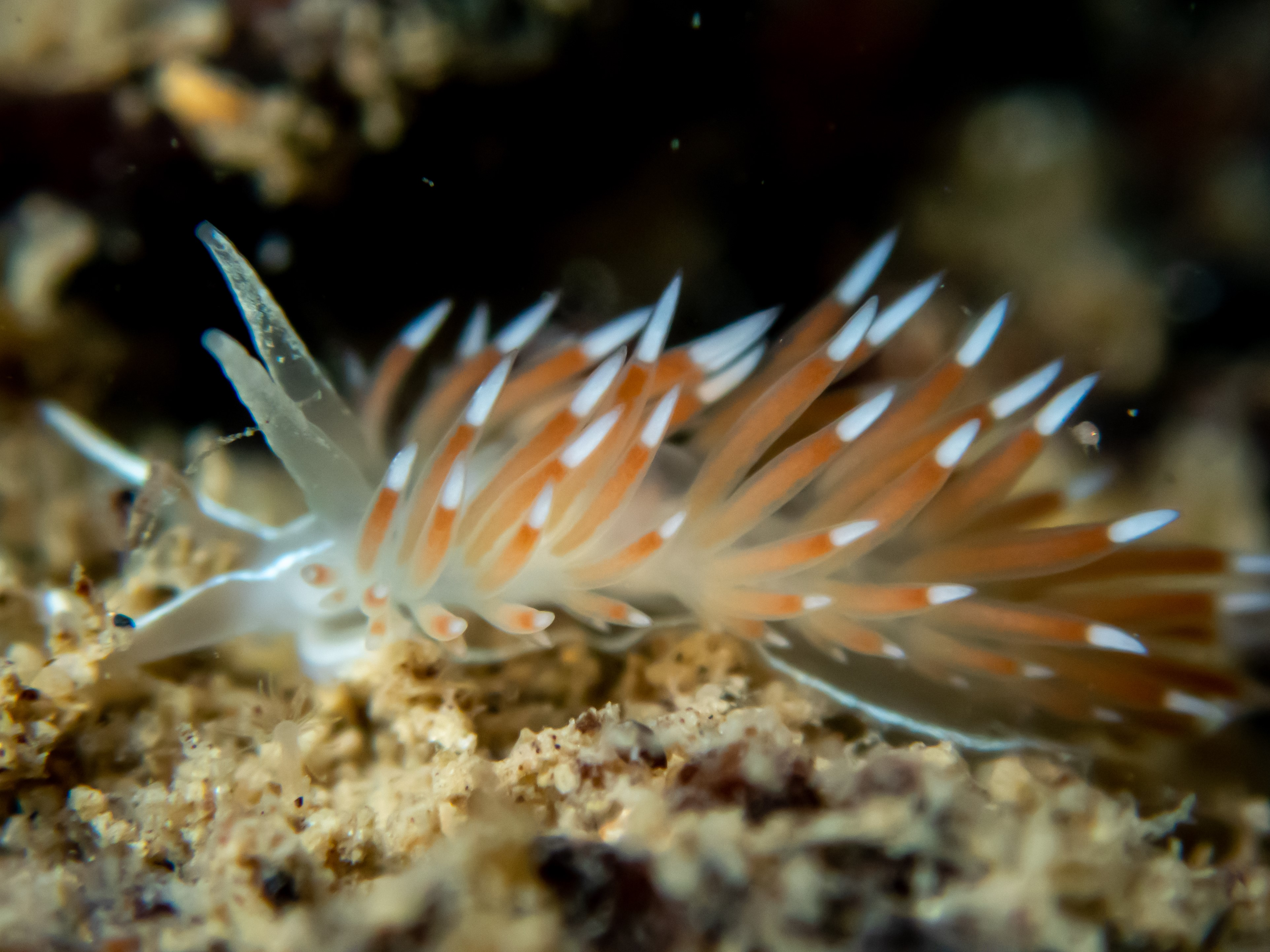
- Coryphellina albomarginata

Scientific classification
- Domain: Eukaryota
- Kingdom: Animalia
- Phylum: Mollusca
- Class: Gastropoda
- Order: Nudibranchia
- Suborder: Cladobranchia
- Superfamily: Fionoidea
- Family: Flabellinidae
- Genus: Coryphellina
- Species: C. albomarginata

Binomial name
- Coryphellina albomarginata (M. C. Miller, 1971)

= Coryphellina albomarginata =

Species of gastropod

Coryphellina albomarginata is a species of sea slug, an aeolid nudibranch, a marine gastropod mollusc in the family Flabellinidae.

== Distribution ==
This species occurs on all coasts of New Zealand.

== Description ==
This flabellinid nudibranch has a translucent body with a line of opaque white pigment at the edge of the foot. The outer half of the rhinophores and oral tentacles are covered with white pigment. The rhinophores are tuberculate on their rear surfaces. The animal grows to 10 mm in length. A variant with lines of white pigment on the oral tentacles and rear surfaces of the rhinophores is known from northern New Zealand.
