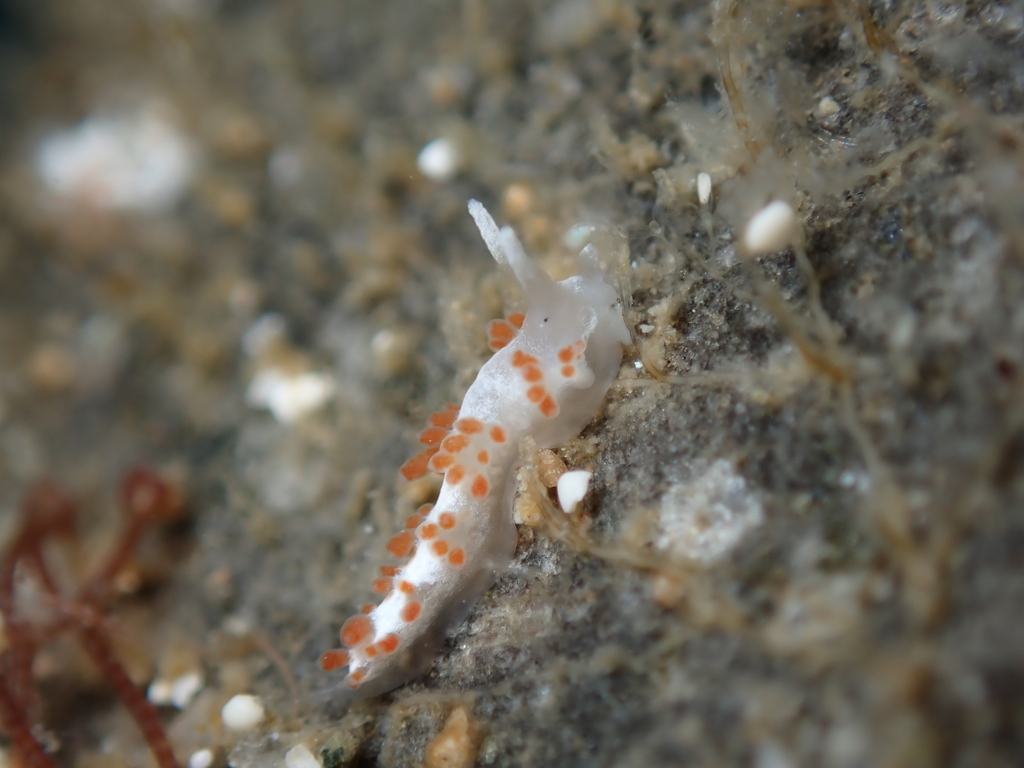

Scientific classification
- Kingdom: Animalia
- Phylum: Mollusca
- Class: Gastropoda
- Order: Nudibranchia
- Suborder: Aeolidacea
- Family: Flabellinidae
- Genus: Edmundsella
- Species: E. bertschi

Binomial name
- Edmundsella bertschi (Gosliner & Kuzirian, 1990)

Synonyms
- Flabellina bertschi Gosliner & Kuzirian, 1990

= Edmundsella bertschi =

Species of gastropod

Edmundsella bertschi is a species of sea slug, an aeolid nudibranch, a marine gastropod mollusc in the family Flabellinidae.

== Distribution ==
This species was described from Baja California.

== Description ==
The description of Flabellina fogata includes a table comparing similar species from Mexico.

Species	Rhinophores	Ground colour	Colour of cerata	Living size (mm)
F. marcusorum	Red, papillate posteriorly	Bright pink	Pink, purple and yellow	< 20
F. telja	Yellow or brown, perfoliate	Light pink, white spots	Brownish pink	< 24
F. vansyoci	Pink, verrucose	Rose pink	Rose pink, white spots	< 15
E. bertschi	White, smooth	White	Reddish pink, white tips	< 8
F. fogata	Translucent orange, annulate	Translucent orange	Red with white spots	< 15
F. cynara	White with purple tips, perfoliate	Pink with purple markings	Salmon & purple, white spots	< 12
