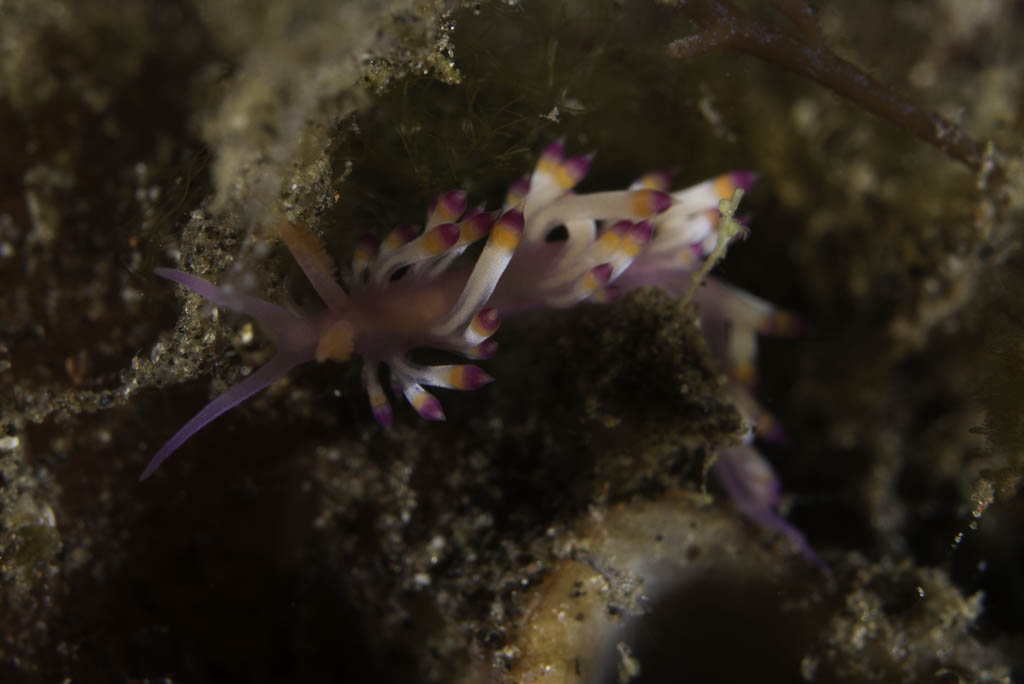
- The nudibranch Flabellina delicata, Tulamben, Bali.

Scientific classification
- Kingdom: Animalia
- Phylum: Mollusca
- Class: Gastropoda
- Order: Nudibranchia
- Suborder: Aeolidacea
- Family: Flabellinidae
- Genus: Coryphellina
- Species: C. delicata

Binomial name
- Coryphellina delicata Gosliner & Willan, 1991

= Coryphellina delicata =

Species of gastropod

Coryphellina delicata is a species of sea slug, an aeolid nudibranch, a marine gastropod mollusc in the family Flabellinidae.

== Distribution ==
This species was described from Madang, Papua New Guinea with additional material from Aliwal Shoals, Natal, South Africa. It has also been reported from Indonesia and Japan and is probably a widespread species in the Indo-Pacific region.
