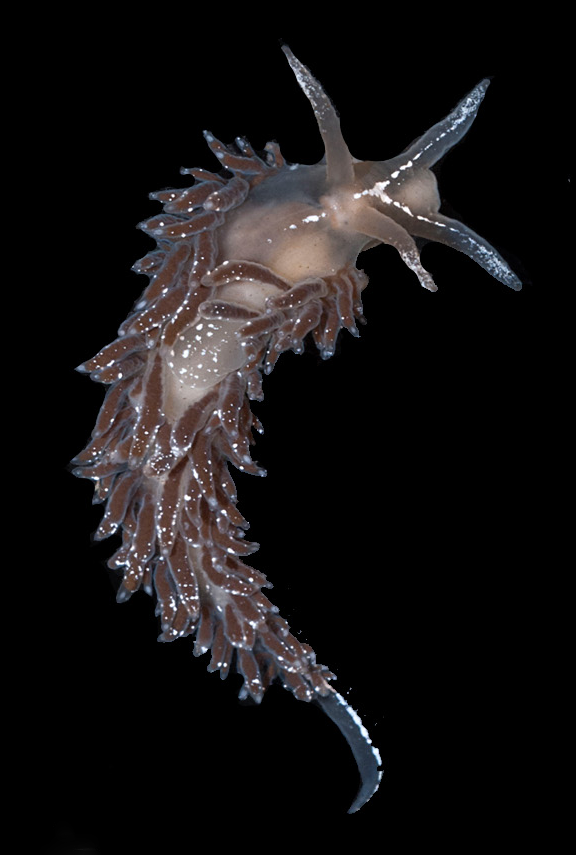

Scientific classification
- Kingdom: Animalia
- Phylum: Mollusca
- Class: Gastropoda
- Order: Nudibranchia
- Suborder: Aeolidacea
- Family: Flabellinidae
- Genus: Coryphella
- Species: C. athadona

Binomial name
- Coryphella athadona Bergh, 1875

Synonyms
- Flabellina athadona (Bergh, 1875); Occidenthella athadona (Bergh, 1875)

= Coryphella athadona =

Species of mollusc

Coryphella athadona is a species of sea slug, an aeolid nudibranch, a marine gastropod mollusc in the family Flabellinidae.
