= Coryphellina hamanni =

Scientific classification
- Kingdom: Animalia
- Phylum: Mollusca
- Class: Gastropoda
- Order: Nudibranchia
- Suborder: Aeolidacea
- Family: Flabellinidae
- Genus: Coryphellina
- Species: C. hamanni

Binomial name
- Coryphellina hamanni (Gosliner, 1994)

Species of gastropod

Coryphellina hamanni is a species of sea slug, an aeolid nudibranch, a marine gastropod mollusc in the family Flabellinidae.

== Distribution ==
This species is known from the Turks and Caicos and the Bahamas, Caribbean Sea.

== Description ==
The maximum recorded body length is 32 mm.

== Ecology ==
The minimum recorded depth for this species is 3 m; maximum recorded depth is 20 m.
