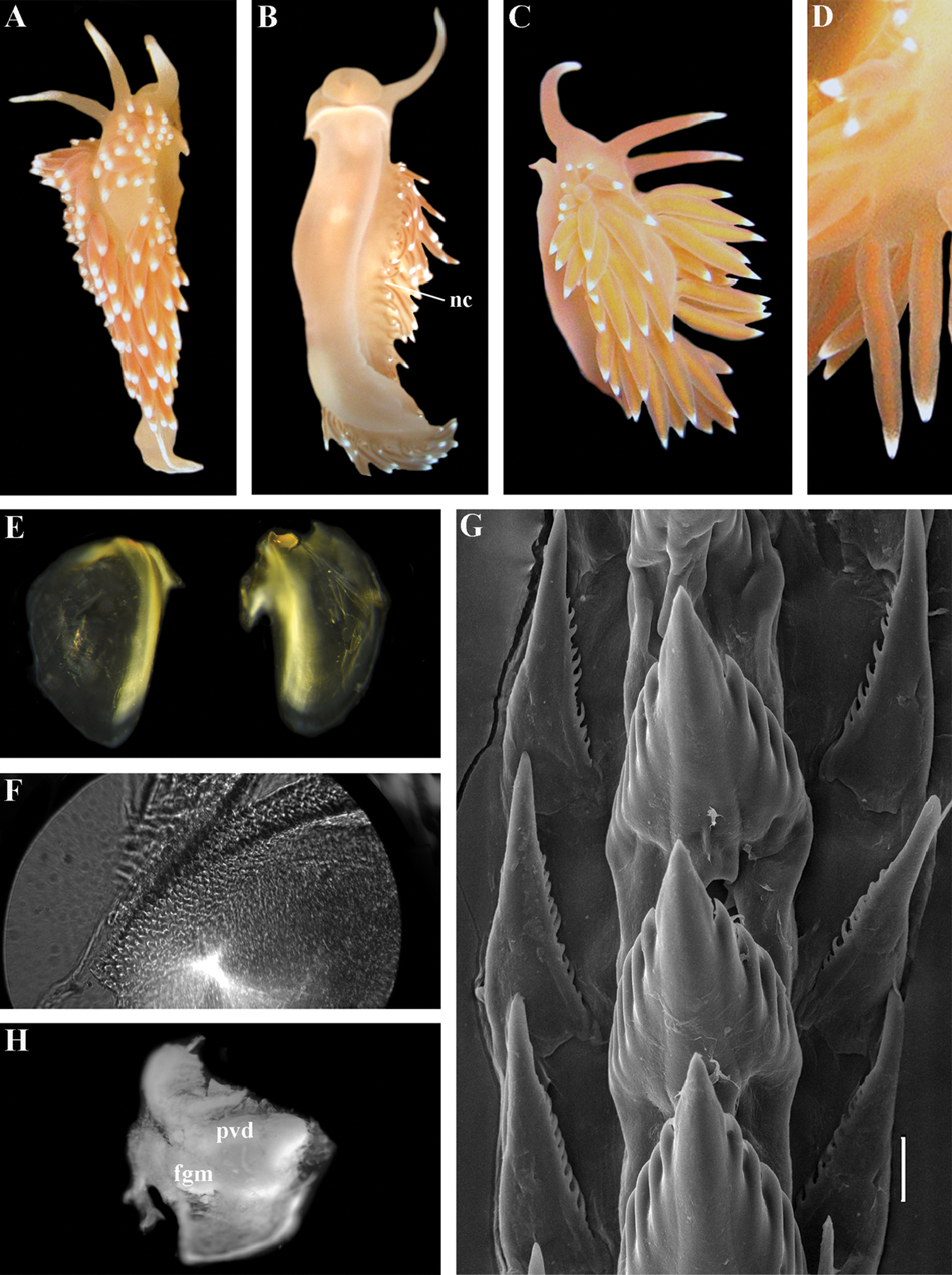

Scientific classification
- Kingdom: Animalia
- Phylum: Mollusca
- Class: Gastropoda
- Order: Nudibranchia
- Suborder: Aeolidacea
- Family: Flabellinidae
- Genus: Coryphella
- Species: C. falklandica

Binomial name
- Coryphella falklandica Eliot, 1907

Synonyms
- Flabellina falklandica (Eliot, 1907); Itaxia falklandica (Eliot, 1907)

= Coryphella falklandica =

Species of gastropod

Coryphella falklandica is a species of sea slug, an aeolid nudibranch, a marine gastropod mollusc in the family Flabellinidae.

== Distribution ==
This species was described from the Falkland Islands. It has been reported from Chiloé Island, Chile, South Georgia and Crozet Islands.
