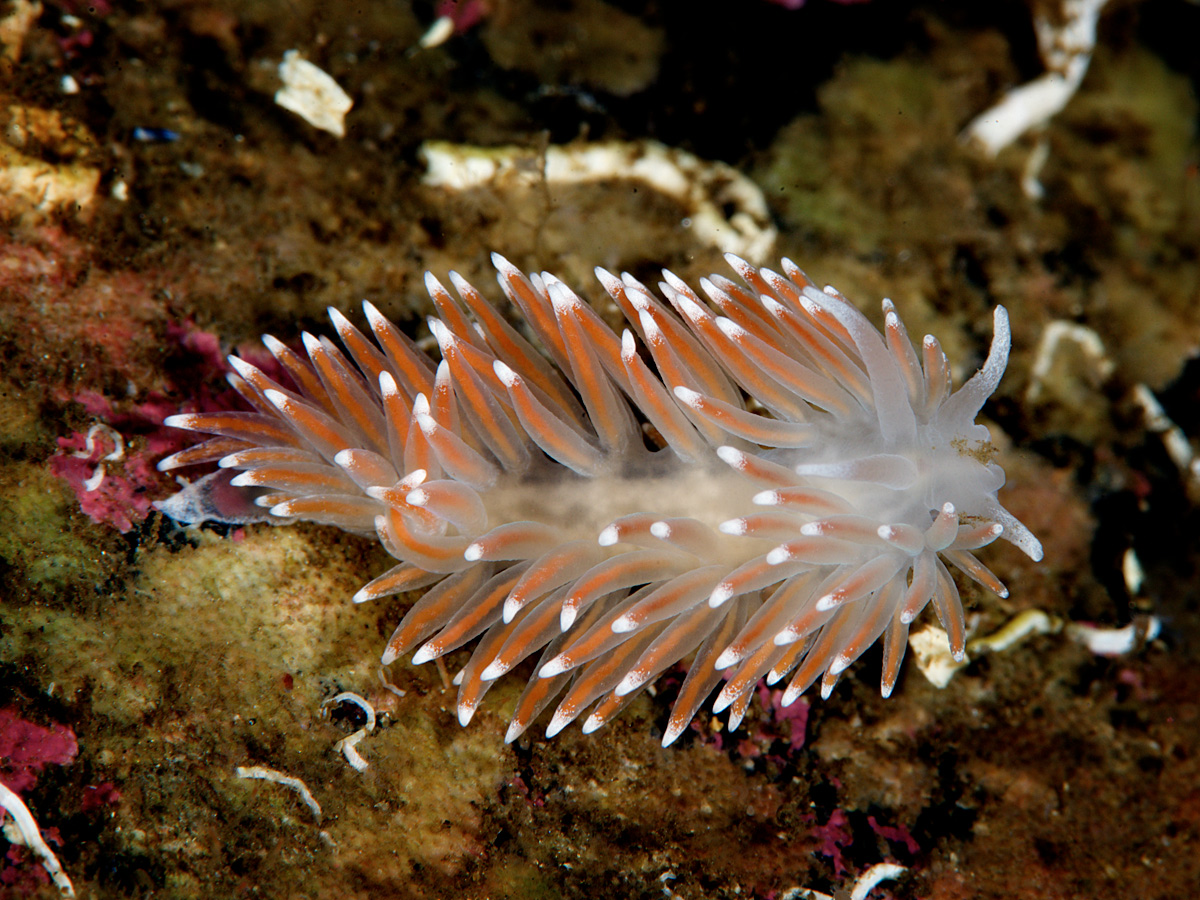
- The nudibranch Flabellina pellucida, Leversund, Gulen, Norway.

Scientific classification
- Kingdom: Animalia
- Phylum: Mollusca
- Class: Gastropoda
- Order: Nudibranchia
- Suborder: Aeolidacea
- Family: Flabellinidae
- Genus: Flabellina
- Species: F. pellucida

Binomial name
- Flabellina pellucida (Alder & Hancock, 1843)

Synonyms
- Carronella pellucida (Alder & Hancock, 1843); Coryphella pellucida (Alder & Hancock, 1843); Coryphella rutila A. E. Verrill, 1979; Eolis pellucida Alder & Hancock, 1843

= Flabellina pellucida =

Species of gastropod

Flabellina pellucida is a species of sea slug, an aeolid nudibranch, a marine heterobranch mollusc in the family Flabellinidae. It is occasionally referred to as the milky white sea slug, the pellucid aeolid, or the red-gilled nudibranch, though these names are not commonly accepted in formal settings.

== Description ==
Flabellina pellucida has a translucent white body and opaque white pigment on the tips of the rhinophores, oral tentacles and cerata. The bodies of the cerata are bright red due to the presence and appearance of the nudibranch's digestive glands. These cerata are arranged in distinct clusters which extend from several common stalks known as peduncles.

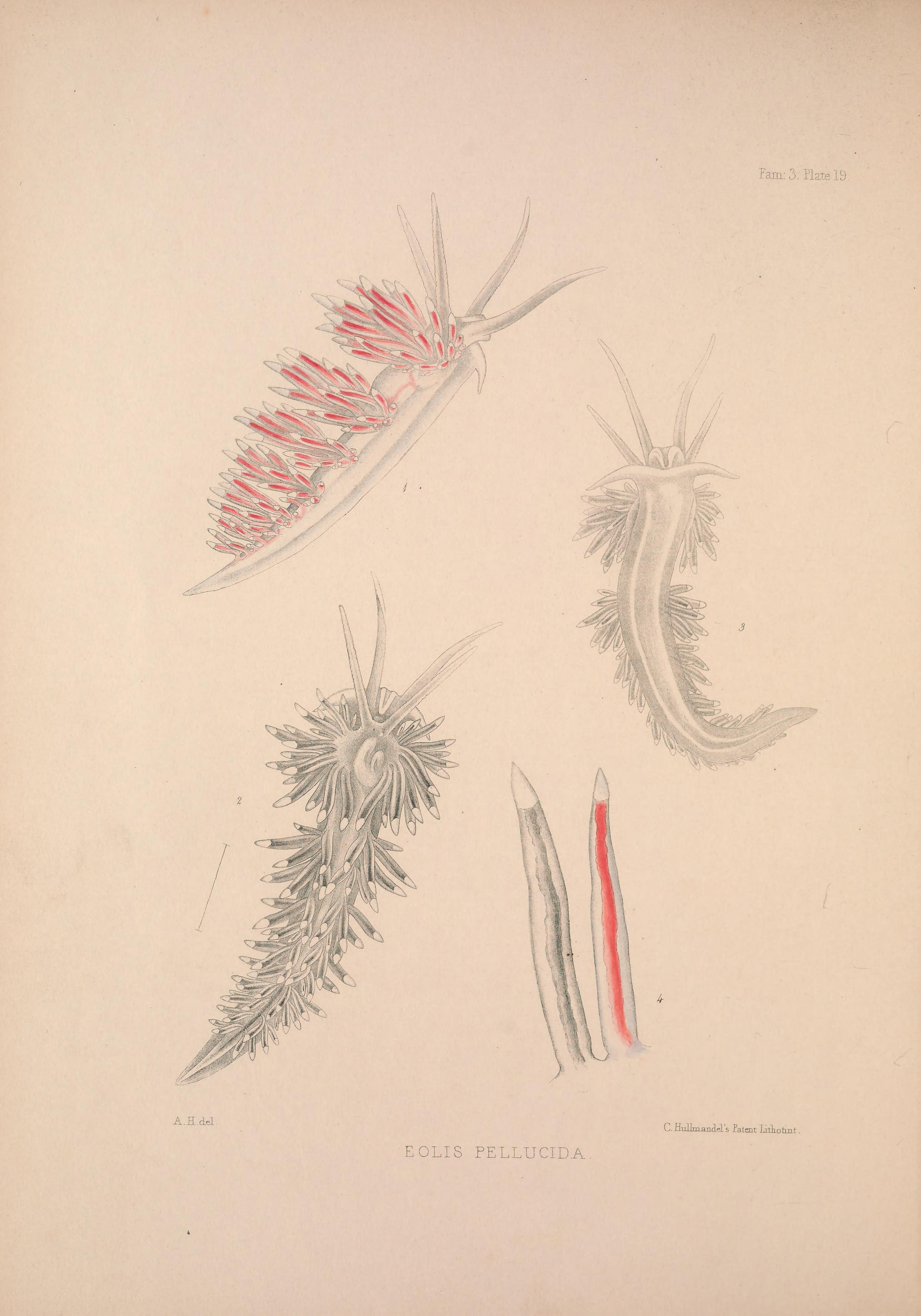
Illustration in A monograph of the British nudibranchiate Mollusca

The maximum recorded body length is 30 mm (1.2 in) or up to 40 mm (1.6 in).

== Distribution ==
This species was described from a single specimen collected from deep water, off Cullercoats, England, North Sea. It has a northerly distribution in the UK, being found most regularly in Scotland.

== Ecology ==
It has been recorded at depths of up to 20 m (66 ft). This species usually feeds on Eudendrium arbuscula, a hydroid in the family Eudendriidae.
