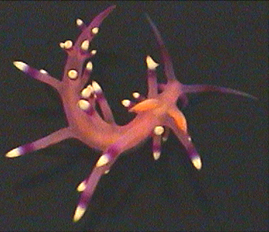
- Coryphellina exoptata

Scientific classification
- Kingdom: Animalia
- Phylum: Mollusca
- Class: Gastropoda
- Order: Nudibranchia
- Suborder: Aeolidacea
- Family: Flabellinidae
- Genus: Coryphellina
- Species: C. exoptata

Binomial name
- Coryphellina exoptata Gosliner & Willan, 1991

= Coryphellina exoptata =

Species of gastropod

Coryphellina exoptata, which can be translated as the much-desired flabellina or desirable flabellina, common name “Cole’s nudibranch”, is a species of colourful sea slug, a marine gastropod mollusc in the family Flabellinidae.

== Distribution ==
This species was described from Madang, Papua New Guinea. Coryphellina exoptata is widespread throughout the tropical waters of the Indo-West Pacific.

== Description ==
Coryphellina exoptata is typically about 30 millimetres (1.2 in) in length when mature but can reach 48 millimetres (1.9 in).

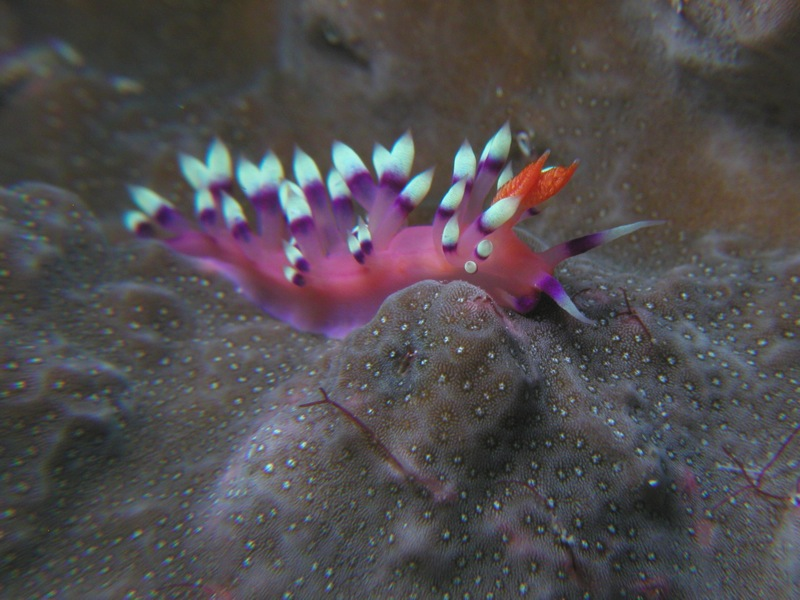
Coryphellina exoptata
