= Coryphella cerverai =

Scientific classification
- Kingdom: Animalia
- Phylum: Mollusca
- Class: Gastropoda
- Order: Nudibranchia
- Suborder: Aeolidacea
- Family: Flabellinidae
- Genus: Coryphella
- Species: C. cerverai

Binomial name
- Coryphella cerverai (Fischer, van der Velde & Roubos, 2007)

Synonyms
- Flabellina cerverai M. A. Fischer, van der Velde & Roubos, 2007; Coryphellina cerverai (M. A. Fischer, van der Velde & Roubos, 2007)

Species of gastropod

Coryphella cerverai is a species of sea slug, an aeolid nudibranch, a marine gastropod mollusc in the family Flabellinidae.

Ekimova et al. (2026) placed it within Coryphella provisionally based upon morphological analysis, believing molecular data is needed to confirm or otherwise clarify its placement.

== Distribution ==
This species was described from Chile.
