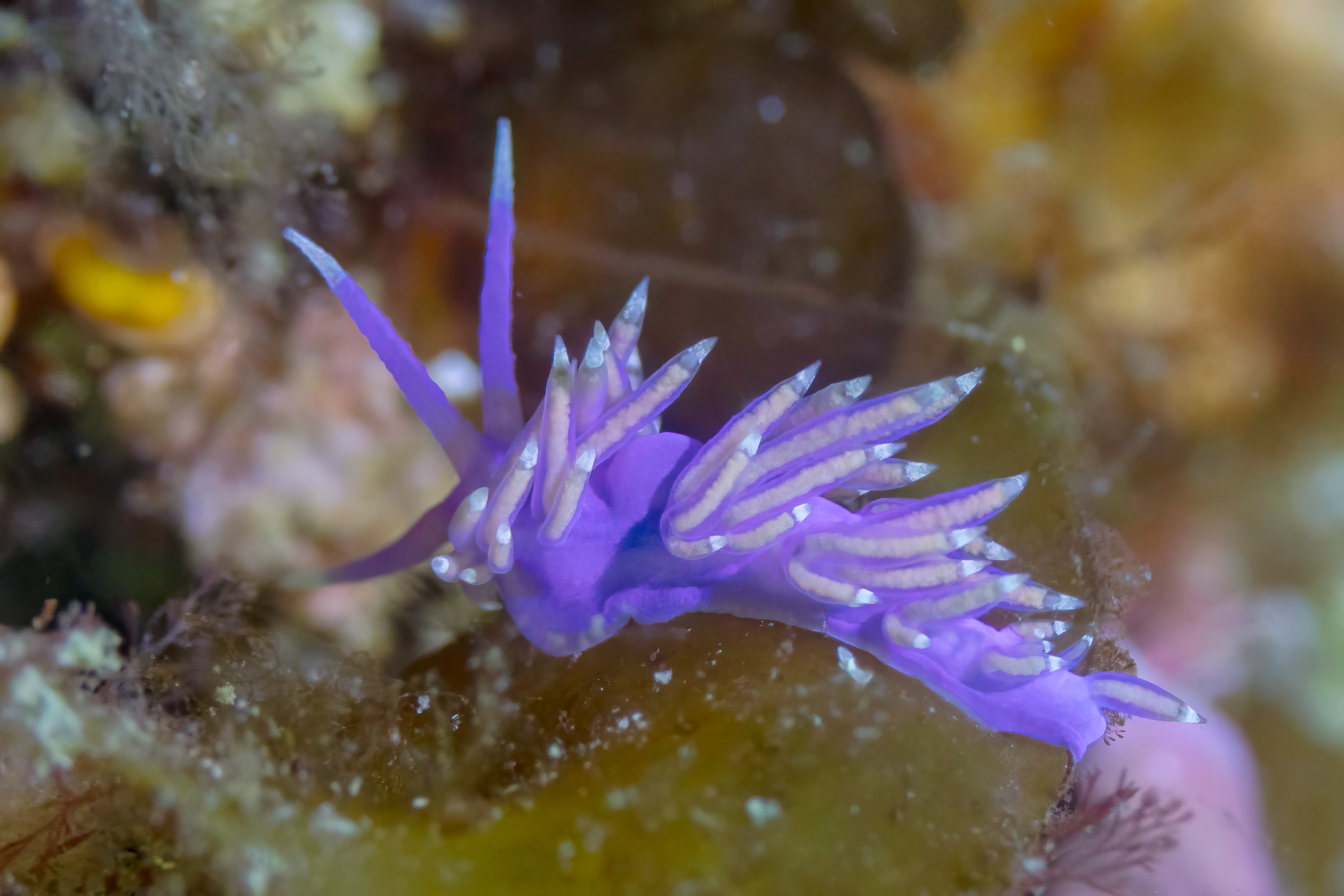
- Edmundsella pedata

Scientific classification
- Kingdom: Animalia
- Phylum: Mollusca
- Class: Gastropoda
- Order: Nudibranchia
- Suborder: Aeolidacea
- Family: Flabellinidae
- Genus: Edmundsella; Korshunova, Martynov, Bakken, Evertsen, Fletcher, Mudianta, Saito, Lundin, Schrödl & Picton, 2017

Type species
- Edmundsella pedata (Montagu, 1816)

= Edmundsella =

Genus of gastropods

Edmundsella is a genus of sea slugs, aeolid nudibranchs, marine gastropod mollusks in the family Flabellinidae.

== Species ==
There are four species within the genus Edmundsella:

- Edmundsella albomaculata Pola, Carmona, Calado & Cervera, 2014
- Edmundsella bertschi Gosliner & Kuzirian, 1990
- Edmundsella pedata Montagu, 1816
- Edmundsella vansyoci Gosliner, 1994
