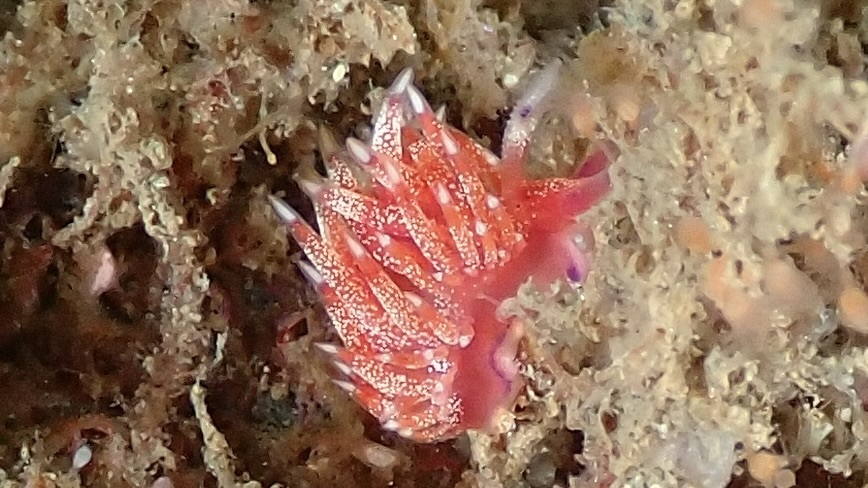

Scientific classification
- Kingdom: Animalia
- Phylum: Mollusca
- Class: Gastropoda
- Order: Nudibranchia
- Suborder: Aeolidacea
- Family: Flabellinopsidae
- Genus: Kynaria; Korshunova, Martynov, Bakken, Evertsen, Fletcher, Mudianta, H. Saito, Lundin, Schrödl & Picton, 2017
- Species: K. cynara

Binomial name
- Kynaria cynara (Marcus, Er. & Marcus, Ev., 1967)

= Kynaria =

Genus of gastropods

Kynaria cynara is a species of sea slug, an aeolid nudibranch, a marine gastropod mollusc in the family Flabellinopsidae. It is the only species in the genus Kynaria.

== Distribution ==
This species was described from the Gulf of California. It was redescribed from further material from the Pacific coast of Mexico. It has been reported as far south as Peru.

== Description ==
The description of Flabellina fogata includes a table comparing similar species from Mexico.

| Species | Rhinophores | Ground colour | Colour of cerata | Living size (mm) |
|---|---|---|---|---|
| Coryphellina marcusorum | Red, papillate posteriorly | Bright pink | Pink, purple and yellow | < 20 |
| Samla telja | Yellow or brown, perfoliate | Light pink, white spots | Brownish pink | < 24 |
| Edmundsella vansyoci | Pink, verrucose | Rose pink | Rose pink, white spots | < 15 |
| Flabellina bertschi | White, smooth | White | Reddish pink, white tips | < 8 |
| Orienthella fogata | Translucent orange, annulate | Translucent orange | Red with white spots | < 15 |
| Kynaria cynara | White with purple tips, perfoliate | Pink with purple markings | Salmon & purple, white spots | < 12 |
