= Cnidosac =

Anatomical feature containing stinging cells

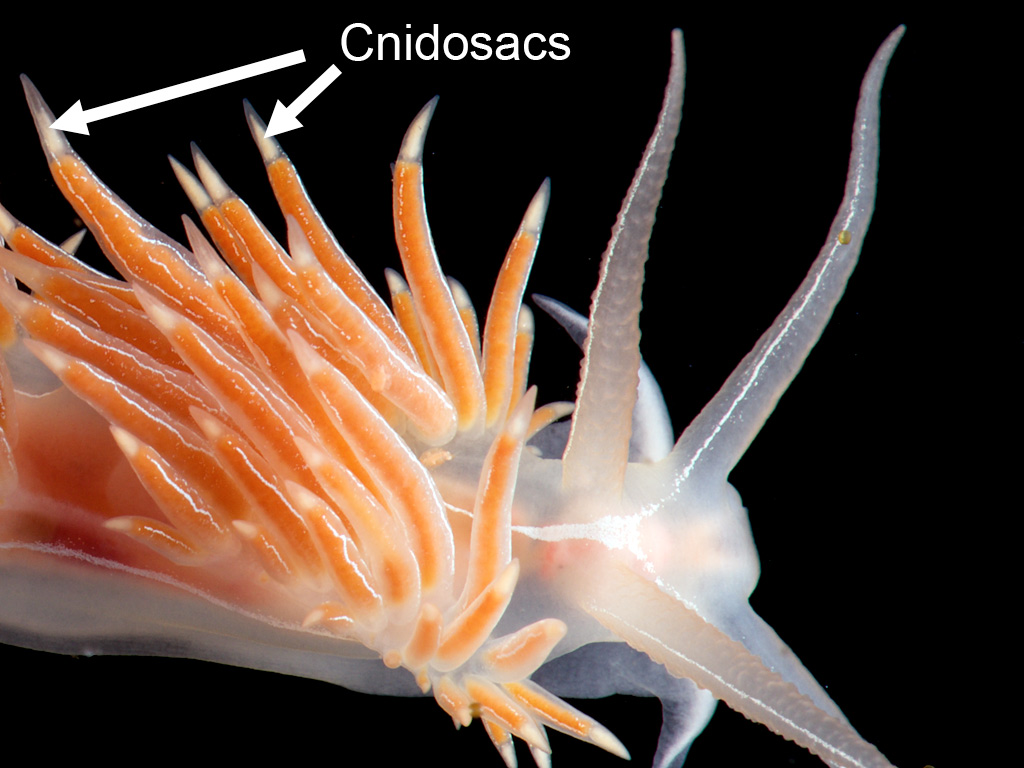
Detail of the aeolid nudibranch Coryphella lineata showing the cnidosacs at the tips of the cerata.

A cnidosac is an anatomical feature that is found in the group of sea slugs known as aeolid nudibranchs, a clade of marine opisthobranch gastropod molluscs. A cnidosac contains cnidocytes, stinging cells that are also known as cnidoblasts or nematocysts. These stinging cells are not made by the nudibranch, but by the species that it feeds upon. They are obtained while digesting prey in a process called kleptocnidy. Once the nudibranch is armed with these stinging cells, they are used in its own defense and to capture prey.

== Description and functions ==
The sea slugs within the nudibranch clade Aeolidida have protruding cerata (singular "ceras") on their dorsal surface. At the tip of each ceras is a small sac in which nematocysts (stinging cells) are stored. These nematocysts originate in the cnidarians (such as sea anemones, hydroids, jellyfish, corals, siphonophores, etc.) that are the food source for aeolid nudibranchs.

== Example ==
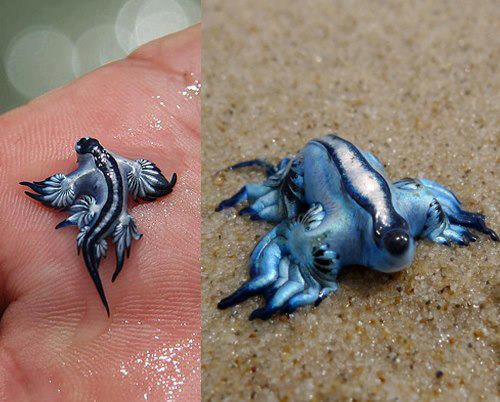
Glaucus atlanticus is the blue sea slug shown here out of water on a beach, and thus collapsed; however, touching the animal directly with your skin can result in a painful sting, with symptoms similar to those caused by the Portuguese man o' war

Glaucus atlanticus is a blue pelagic aeolid nudibranch. Individuals in this species can be dangerous for humans to handle; the cnidosacs of G. atlanticus often contain particularly powerful venomous stinging cells from one of its food species: the pelagic siphonophore known as the Portuguese Man o' War, Physalia physalis.

== See also ==
- Diverticulum (mollusc), Diverticula are the outgrowths of the digestive gland within the cerata.
- Kleptocnidy, the process of obtaining cnidocytes from prey.
