= Charles Henry O'Donoghue =

English zoologist

Charles Henry O'Donoghue FRSE FZS (23 September 1885 – 28 November 1961) was an English zoologist who studied molluscs, a malacologist. His publications mostly deal with sea slugs and he also named a number of Bryozoans. A collection of over 700 items left to the University of Reading is known as the O'Donoghue Collection.

== Life ==
He was born in Bedfordshire on 23 September 1885 the son of Charles Henry O'Donoghue. He studied zoology at University College London, receiving his degree from the University of London.

From 1918 to 1927 he was Professor of Zoology at the University of Manitoba. From 1923 he additionally acted as Director of the Marine Biological Station at Nanaimo on Vancouver Island. He also helped to establish the Prince Rupert Island and Cultus Lake research stations. In 1928 he became a Reader in natural history at the University of Edinburgh.

In 1928 he was elected a Fellow of the Royal Society of Edinburgh. His proposers were James Hartley Ashworth, John Stephenson, Robert Stewart MacDougall and James Ritchie. He won the Society's Neill Prize for the period 1929/31. From 1933 to 1936 he was President of the Royal Physical Society of Edinburgh.

In 1939 he moved to England as Professor of Zoology at Reading University, replacing Prof Francis Cole. In 1948 he was President of the Science Technologists Association.

He taught in Winnipeg, Canada; and Edinburgh, Scotland. Most of the species he described were from the Pacific north-west of Canada.

He died in Reading, Berkshire on 28 November 1961.

== Taxa ==
Species named in honor of this malacologist include:

- Acanthobothrium odonoghuei Campbell & Beveridge, 2002 - a platyhelminth
- Cradoscrupocellaria odonoghuei Vieira, Spencer Jones & Winston, 2013 - a bryozoan
- Doris odonoghuei Steinberg, 1963 - a nudibranch
- Prochristianella odonoghuei Beveridge, 1990 - a platyhelminth

The World Register of Marine Species (WoRMS) lists 186 marine taxa named by O'Donoghue.

== Publications ==
Books

- Zoomorphology (1917)
- An Introduction to Zoology (1921)
- The Fishery Grounds Near Alexandria: Bryozoa (1939)

Papers

Scientific papers published by Charles O'Donoghue include:

- O'Donoghue, Charles Henry. 1921. Nudibranchiate Mollusca from the Vancouver Island region. Transactions of the Royal Canadian Institute 13(1):147-209, pls. 7-11 [1-5].
- O'Donoghue, C. H. 1922. Notes on the nudibranchiate Mollusca from the Vancouver Island region. I. Colour variations. Transactions of the Royal Canadian Institute 14(1):123-130, pl. 2.
- O'Donoghue, C. H. 1922a. Notes on the nudibranchiate Mollusca from the Vancouver Island region. III. Records of species and distribution. Transactions of the Royal Canadian Institute 14(1):145-167, pls. 5-6.
- O'Donoghue, C. H. 1922b. Notes on the taxonomy of nudibranchiate Mollusca from the Pacific coast of North America. I. On the identification of Cavolina (i.e. Hermissenda) crassicornis of Eschscholtz. Nautilus 35(3):74-77.
- O'Donoghue, C. H. 1922c. Notes on the taxonomy of nudibranchiate Mollusca from the Pacific coast of North America. Proceedings of the Malacological Society of London 15(2,3):133-150.
  - I On Cavolina crassicornis and C. subrosacea, of Eschscholtz, pp. 133–136.
  - II On the genus Triopha, Bergh, pp. 136–138.
  - III On Flabellina (Aeolis) iodinea, Cooper, and on Thecacera velox, Cockerell, pp. 138–140.
  - IV On Janolus (Aeolis) barbarensis, Cooper, and on the Aeolidia herculea of Bergh, pp. 140–142.
  - V On the family Doriopsidae (Doridopsidae), pp. 142–145.
  - VI On Fiona marina, Forskal, pp. 145–147.
  - VII On Melibe (Chioraera) leonina, Gould, pp. 147–150.
- O'Donoghue, C. H. 1924. Notes on the nudibranchiate Mollusca from the Vancouver Island region. IV. Additional species and records. Transactions of the Royal Canadian Institute 15(1):1-33, pls. 1-2.
- O'Donoghue, C. H. 1924a. Report on Opisthobranchiata from the Abrolhos Islands, Western Australia, with description of a new parasitic copepod. Journal of the Linnean Society of London 35:521-579, pls. 27-30.
- O'Donoghue, C. H. 1926. A list of the nudibranchiate Mollusca recorded from the Pacific coast of North America, with notes on their distribution. Transactions of the Royal Canadian Institute 15(2):199-247.
- O'Donoghue, C. H. 1926a. On the status of the nudibranch genera Amphorina, Cratena, Eubranchus, and Galvina. Proceedings of the Malacological Society of London 17(3):127-131.
- O'Donoghue, C. H. 1927. Notes on the nudibranchiate Mollusca from the Vancouver Island region. V. Two new species and one new record. Transactions of the Royal Canadian Institute 16(1):1-12, pl. 1.
- O'Donoghue, C. H. 1927a. Notes on a collection of nudibranchs from Laguna Beach, California. Journal of Entomology & Zoology, Pomona College 19(1-4):77-119, pls. 1-3.
- O'Donoghue, C. H. 1929. XXXVIII. Report on the Opisthobranchia. In: Zoological results of the Cambridge Expedition to the Suez Canal, 1924. Transactions of the Zoological Society of London. 22(6):713-841.
- O'Donoghue, C. H. 1929a. Opisthobranchiate Mollusca collected by the South African Marine Biological Survey. Union of South Africa. Fisheries & Marine Biological Survey Report No. 7 for the year ending June 1929, pp. 1–84, pls. 1-8. Special Reports No. 1.
- O'Donoghue, C. H. 1932. Notes on Nudibranchiata from southern India. Proceedings of the Malacological Society of London 20:141-166.
- O'Donoghue, C. H. 1933. Kelaart's work on the Nudibranchiata of Ceylon. Proceedings of the Malacological Society of London 20(4):221-226, pl. 19.
- O'Donoghue, C. H., & Elsie O'DONOGHUE. 1922. Notes on the nudibranchiate Mollusca of the Vancouver Island region. II. The spawn of certain species. Transactions of the Royal Canadian Institute 14(1):131-143, pls. 3-4.
- O'Donoghue, C. H., & Kathleen M. WHITE. 1940. A collection of marine molluscs, mainly opisthobranchs, from Palestine. Proceedings of the Malacological Society of London 24(3):92-96.
