= Cerata =

Anatomical structures found in nudibranch sea slugs

The tortrix moth genus Cerata is considered a junior synonym of Cydia.

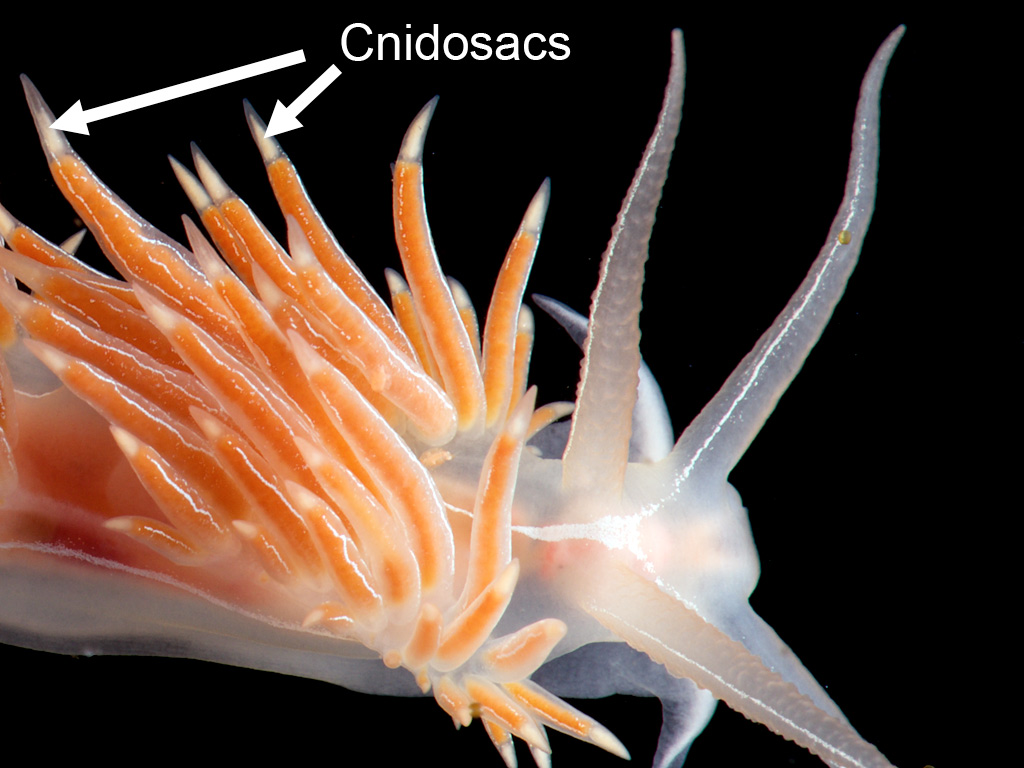
Detail of the aeolid nudibranch Flabellina aff. lineata showing the cerata and cnidosacs.

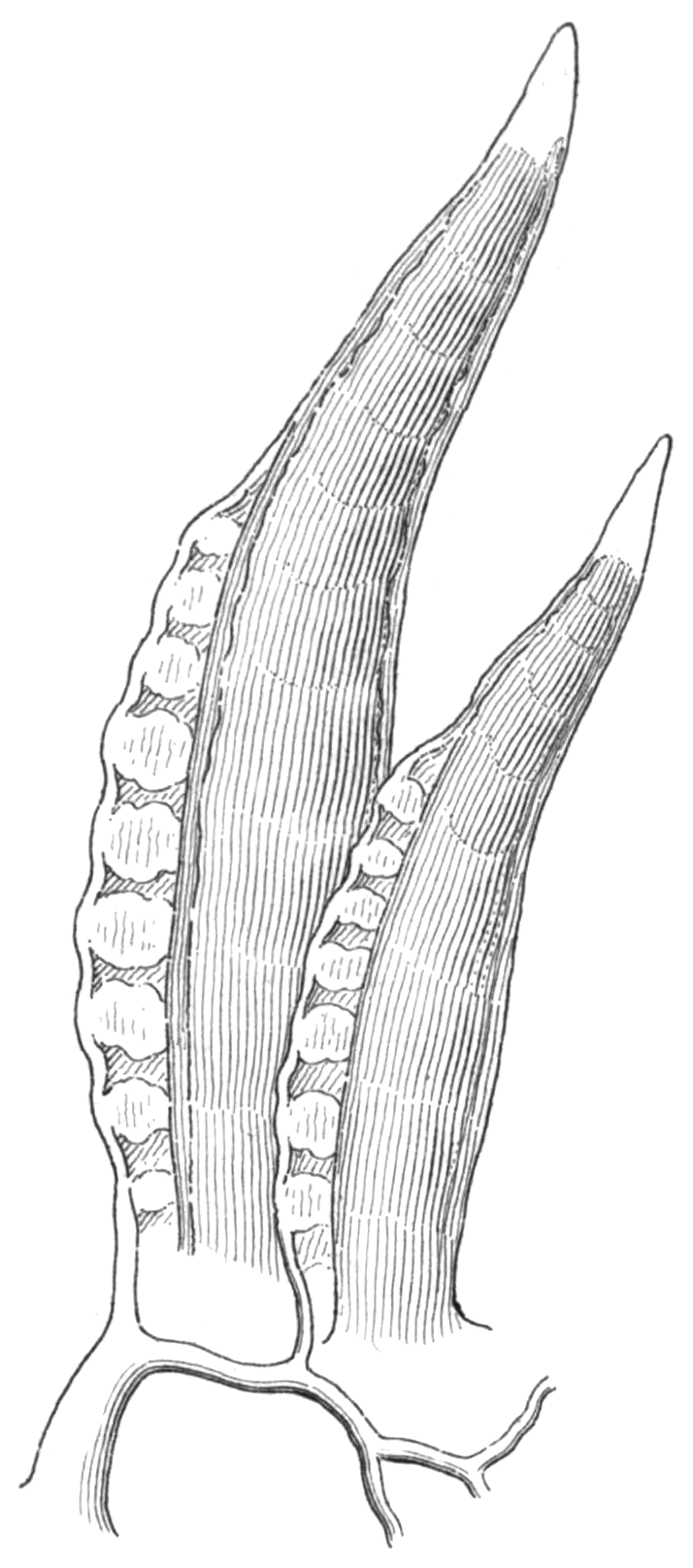
Drawing of cerata of Fiona pinnata. There are small efferent vessels in cerata with puckered membranous fringe on the inner sides. The vessels are leading to the great median trunk.

Cerata, singular ceras, are anatomical structures found externally in nudibranch sea slugs, especially in aeolid nudibranchs, marine opisthobranch gastropod mollusks in the clade Aeolidida. The word ceras comes from the Greek word κέρας (kéras), meaning "horn", a reference to the shape of these structures.

Cerata are dorsal and lateral outgrowths on the upper surfaces of the body of these nudibranchs.

== Function ==
Cerata greatly extend the surface area of nudibranchs and aid in respiration, the process of gas exchange for metabolic use.

Cerata are also used, in some cases, for attack and defense. In many aeolid nudibranchs, the digestive system extends into the cerata. These nudibranchs eat stinging celled animals (Cnidarians) such as anemones, hydroids and sea fans or Portuguese men o' war. The stinging cells or nematocysts are passed unharmed through the digestive system to cnidosacs at the tips of the cerata in a process called kleptocnidy. Here the nematocysts mature and are then used by the nudibranch for its own defense.

In some nudibranchs, cerata are used as decoy tactics. Typically, these cerata are not armed with nematocysts, but when attacked, the nudibranch will autotomise or drop one or more of its cerata. The dropped cerata produce a sticky secretion and wriggle energetically for some time after being cast off, presumably causing a distraction and allowing the nudibranch to escape.

== See also ==
- Diverticulum (mollusc) – outgrowths of the digestive gland within the cerata
