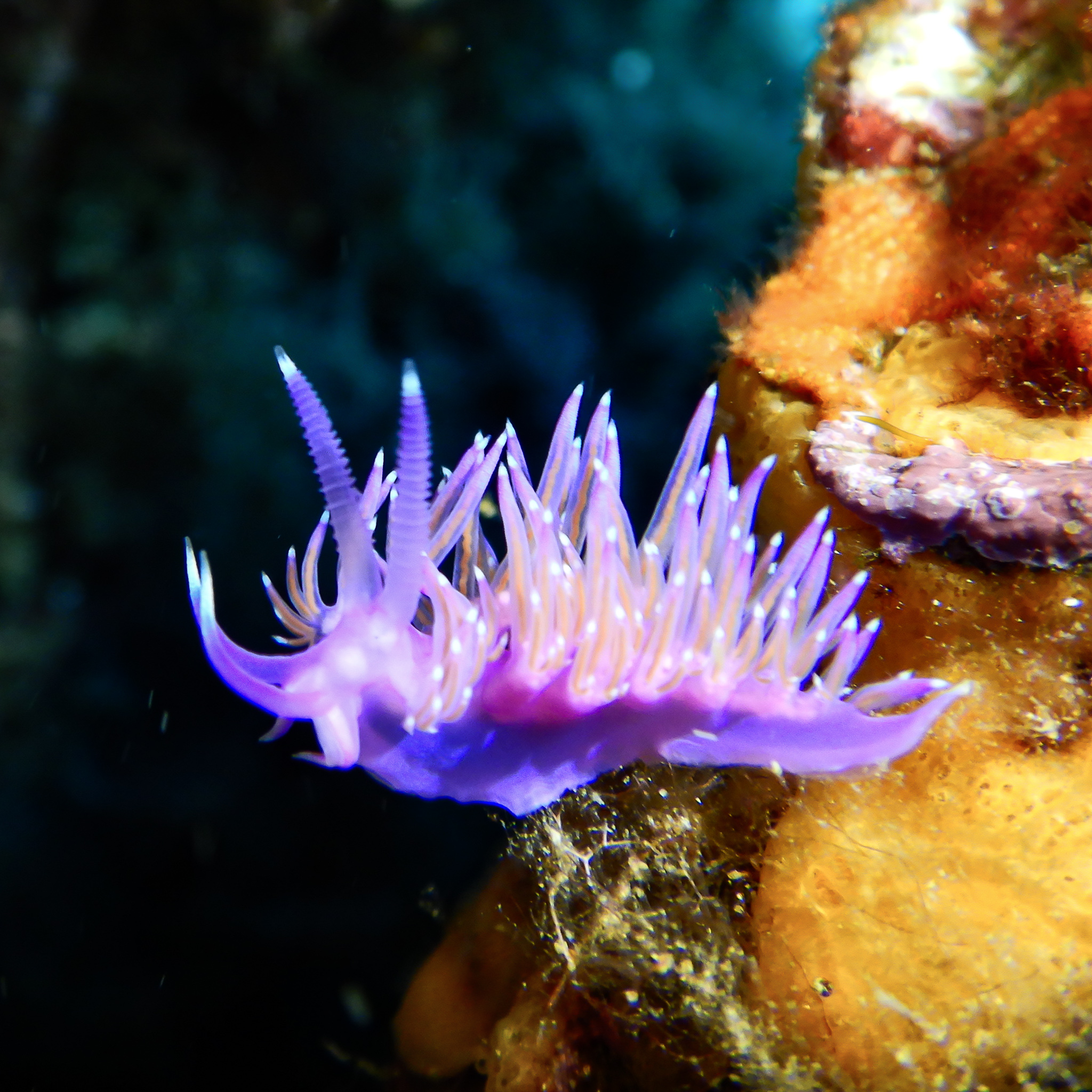
- Flabellina affinis

Scientific classification
- Kingdom: Animalia
- Phylum: Mollusca
- Class: Gastropoda
- Order: Nudibranchia
- Suborder: Aeolidacea
- Superfamily: Fionoidea
- Family: Flabellinidae; Bergh, 1889

Type genus
- Flabellina Gray, 1833

Genera
- See text

= Flabellinidae =

Family of gastropods

Flabellinidae is a family of nudibranchs, shell-less marine gastropod molluscs or sea slugs, in the superfamily Flabellinoidea.

== Genera ==
According to Korshunova et al. (2025), genera within the family Flabellinidae include:

- Calmella Eliot, 1910
- Carronella Korshunova, Martynov, Bakken, Evertsen, Fletcher, Mudianta, Saito, Lundin, Schrödl & Picton, 2017
- Coryphellina O'Donoghue, 1929
- Edmundsella Korshunova, Martynov, Bakken, Evertsen, Fletcher, Mudianta, Saito, Lundin, Schrödl & Picton, 2017
- Flabellina Gray, 1833 in Griffith and Pidgeon, 1833–34
- Paraflabellina Korshunova, Martynov, Bakken, Evertsen, Fletcher, Mudianta, Saito, Lundin, Schrödl & Picton, 2017

In Ekimova et al. (2026), Coryphellidae and Paracoryphellidae were considered synonymous of Flabellinidae and several genera were lumped with each other, proposing the following list of genera:

- Chlamylla Bergh, 1886 [= Paracoryphella Miller, 1971; = Polaria Korshunova et al., 2017]
- Coryphella J. E. Gray, 1850 [= Corrupta Korshunova et al., 2025; = Portorchardia Korshunova et al., 2025]
- Coryphellina O’Donoghue, 1929
- Edmundsella Korshunova et al., 2017
- Flabellina McMurtrie, 1831 [= Calmella Eliot, 1910; = Carronella Korshunova et al., 2017; = Paraflabellina Korshunova et al., 2017]
- Launsina Ekimova et al., 2026
- Mgueolia Korshunova, Fletcher & Martynov, 2025
- Ziminella Korshunova et al., 2017
