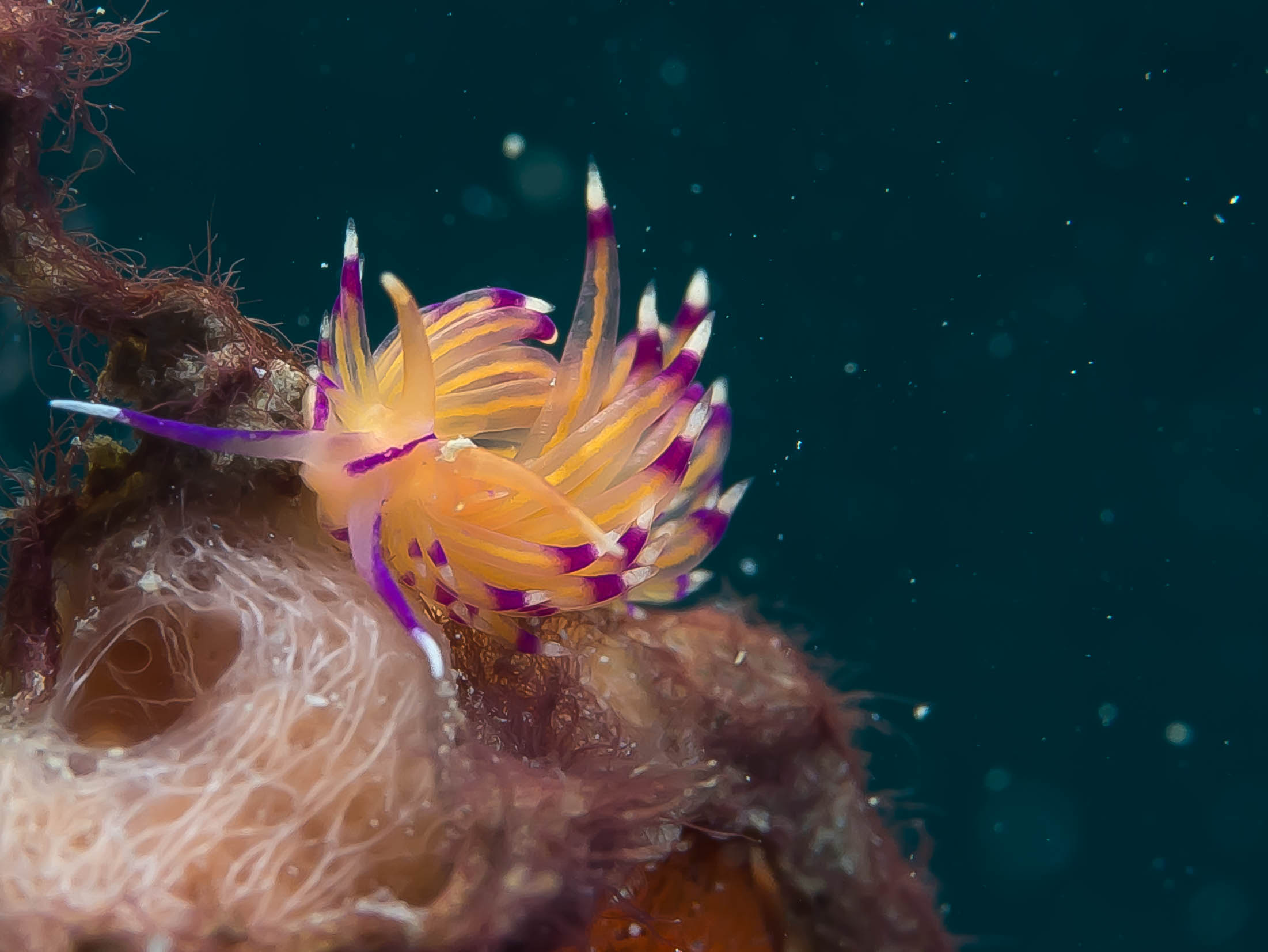
- Unidentia angelvaldesi

Scientific classification
- Kingdom: Animalia
- Phylum: Mollusca
- Class: Gastropoda
- Order: Nudibranchia
- Suborder: Aeolidacea
- Family: Piseinotecidae
- Genus: Unidentia; Millen & Hermosillo, 2012

Type species
- Unidentia angelvaldesi Millen & Hermosillo, 2012

= Unidentia =

Genus of nudibranchs

Unidentia is a genus of aeolid nudibranchs and is the type genus of the family Piseinotecidae. The genus currently contains five described species and is found in tropical and subtropical marine environments.

== Etymology ==
The name Unidentia is derived from the Latin uni ("one") and dens (genitive dentis, "tooth"), referring to the single row of feeding structures that are a defining characteristic of the genus.

== Distribution and habitat ==
Members of the genus are known from the tropical eastern Pacific and Indo-Pacific regions, including Mexico, Panama, Japan, Indonesia, and the Philippines. They are typically associated with hydroids, on which they feed, and may exhibit variation in coloration depending on their diet.

== Description ==
Species of Unidentia are aeolid nudibranchs with elongate bodies bearing numerous finger-like cerata. These cerata contain cnidosacs, which store stinging cnidocyte cells obtained from prey through kleptocnidy.

Members of the genus are typically brightly coloured, often displaying combinations of white, orange, and purple. Diagnostic characteristics include a uniseriate radula (a single row of teeth), an acleioproctic anus positioned outside the ceratal clusters, and a reproductive system featuring a chitinous penial (penile) stylet. The cerata are arranged in rows rather than arches, and the rhinophores are smooth. Distinct oral glands are also present.

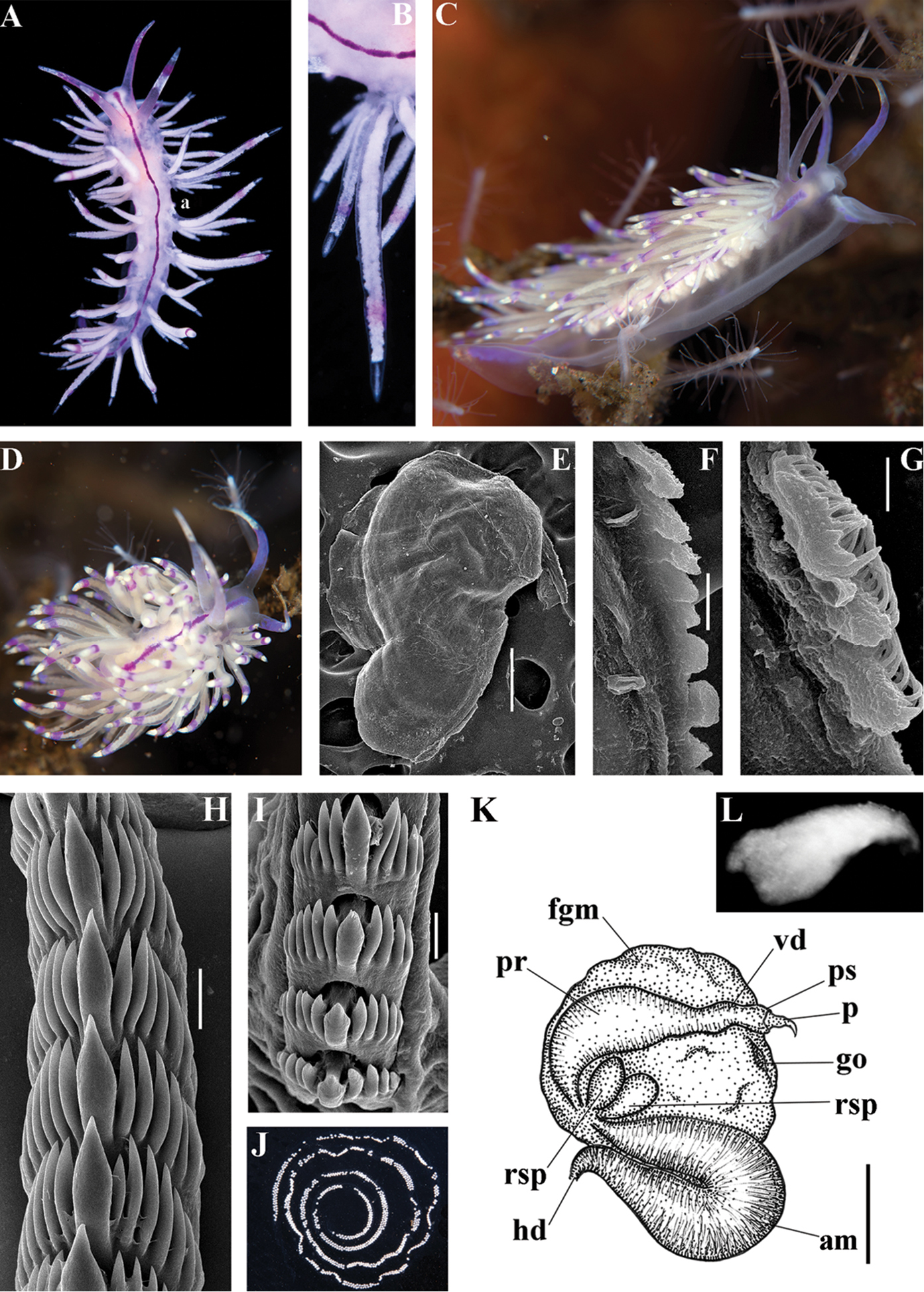
Anatomy of Unidentia sandramillenae displaying distinctive uniseriate radula and genitalia, 2017

== Taxonomy ==
=== Taxonomic history ===
The genus Unidentia and the family Unidentiidae were established in 2012 to accommodate Unidentia angelvaldesi, a species whose familial and generic placement was considered problematic.

A phylogenetic study in 2017 confirmed the distinctness of the family and expanded it to include the sister genus Pacifia. A large-scale phylogenetic analysis in 2019 then proposed the superfamily Unidentioidea to form a distinct lineage based on molecular and morphological evidence, and introduced a third genus under the same family, Phetia. These revisions placed Unidentia within a broader phylogenetic framework and demonstrated that several features originally considered diagnostic of the genus are characteristic of the family as a whole.

In the most recent development, Unidentioidea and Unidentiidae was absolished, Phetia made synonymous with Piseinotecus, and the affected genera moved to Piseinotecidae, who then, along with countless other families, was reassinged to Fionoidea.

=== Mosaic morphology ===
Unidentia has been described as exhibiting a combination of morphological traits, such as radular structure, body form, and reproductive anatomy, that are otherwise characteristic of different aeolid groups. These include features associated with multiple superfamilies, including Fionoidea, Aeolidioidea and Flabellinoidea. This mosaic-like combination of characteristics has contributed to historical difficulties in classification and was one of the reasons the group was previously misassigned to other taxa. Molecular phylogeny has since clearly separated Unidentia from these other families.

=== Type species ===
The type species of the genus is Unidentia angelvaldesi. It was described from specimens collected in the eastern Pacific and Indo-Pacific regions and exhibits the defining features of the genus, including a uniseriate radula, acleioproctic anus, and a penial stylet. The species has also been referred to as Flabellina angelvaldesi in some literature, although this combination is not currently accepted.

== Species ==
The genus includes the following species:

- Unidentia aliciae Korshunova, Mehrotra, Sp. Arnold, Lundin, Picton & Martynov, 2019
- Unidentia angelvaldesi Millen & Hermosillo, 2012
- Unidentia kiku Korshunova, Fletcher & Martynov, 2025
- Unidentia nihonrossija Korshunova, Martynov, Bakken, Evertsen, Fletcher, Mudianta, H. Saito, Lundin, Schrödl & Picton, 2017
- Unidentia sandramillenae Korshunova, Martynov, Bakken, Evertsen, Fletcher, Mudianta, H. Saito, Lundin, Schrödl & Picton, 2017

== Gallery ==
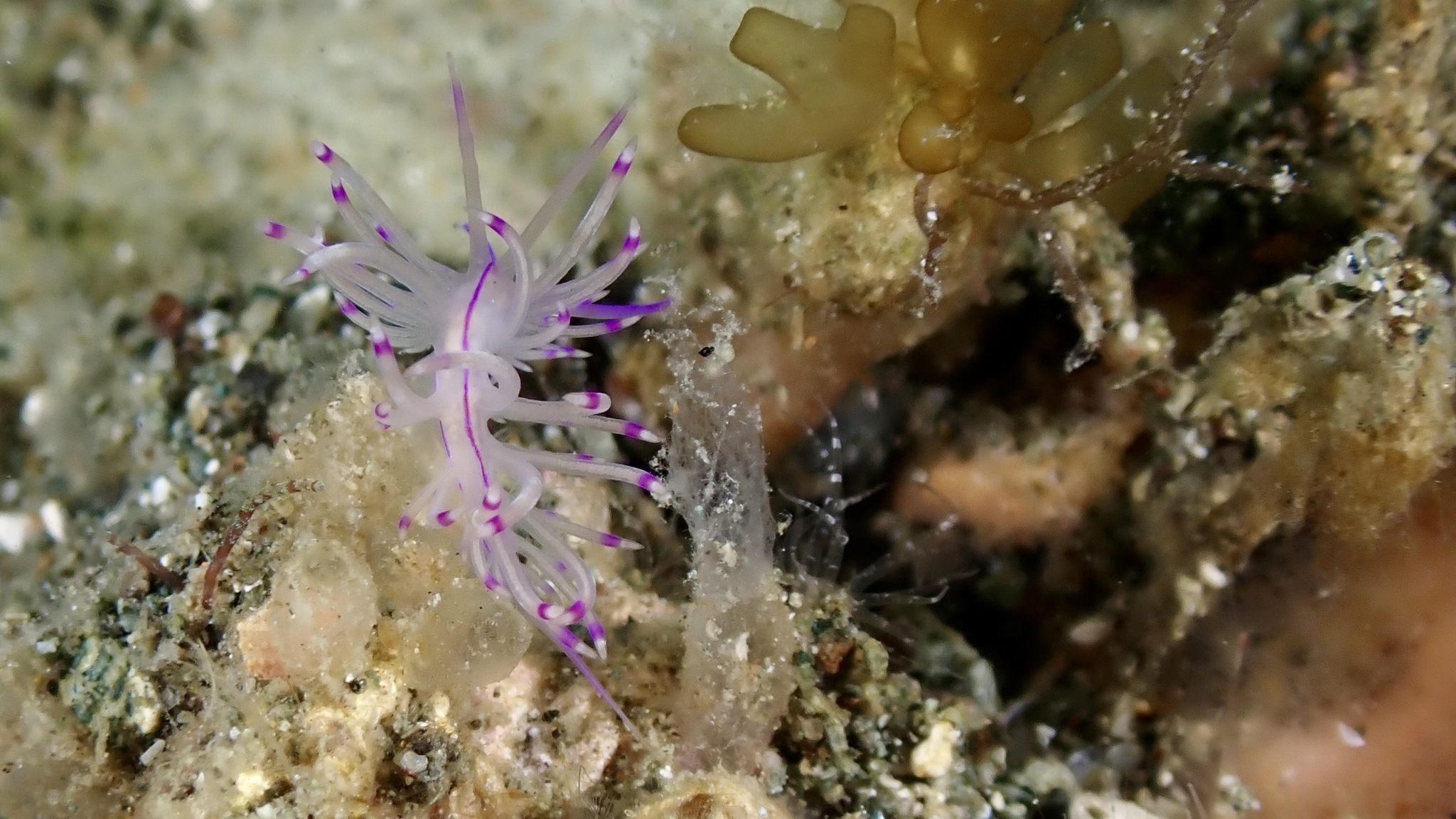
Unidentia sandramillenae, Southern Leyte, Philippines

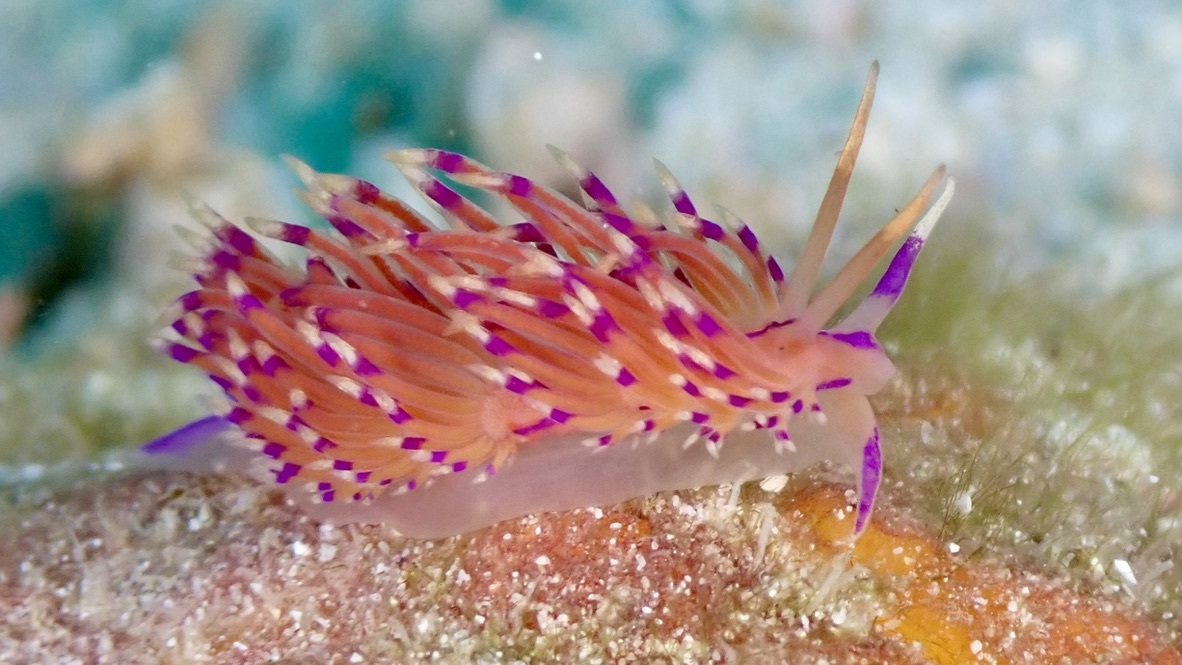
Unidentia aliciae, Romblon, Philippines

== See also ==
- Sea slug
- Nudibranch
- Aeolidacea
