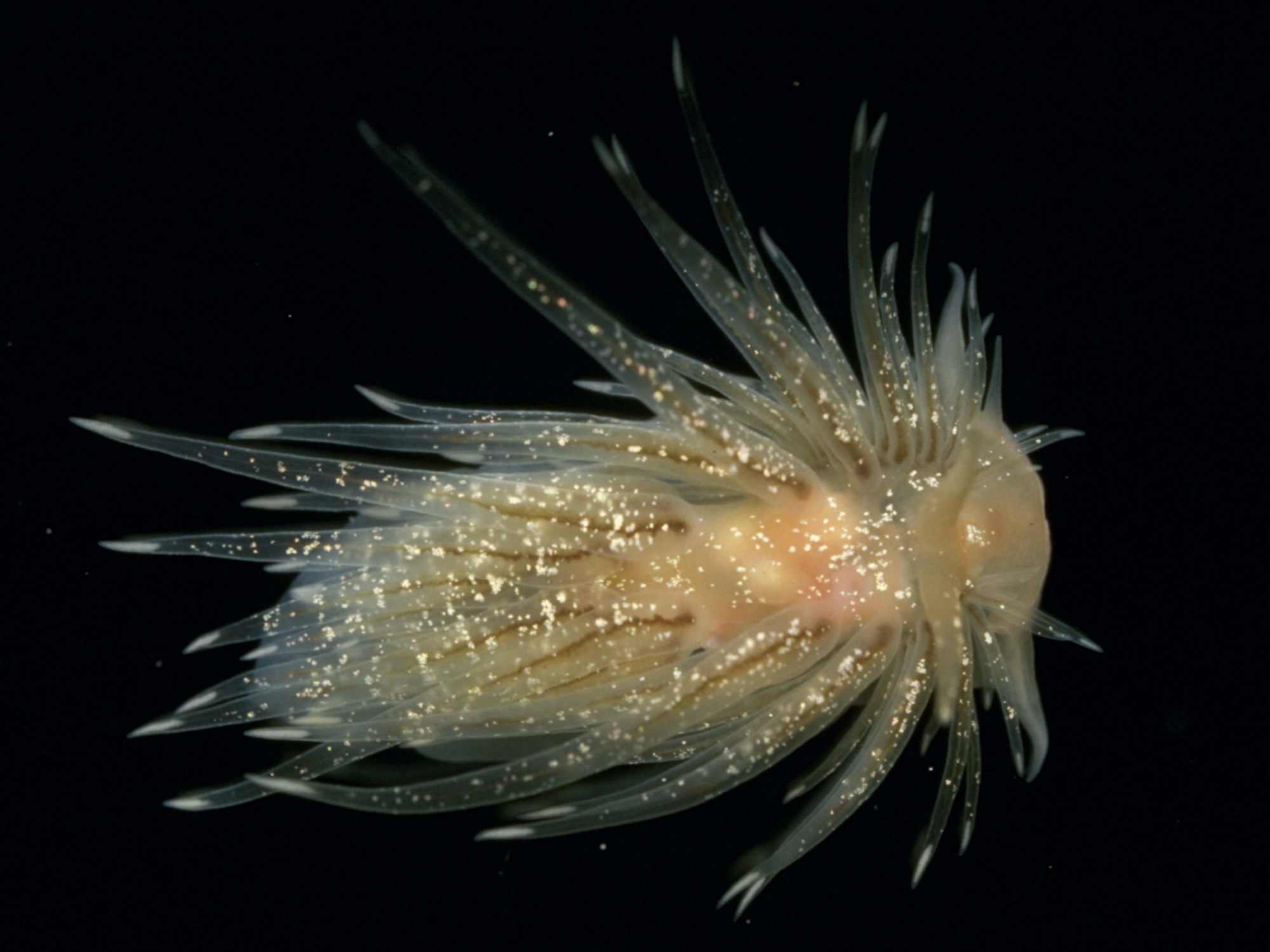
- Cumanotus beaumonti
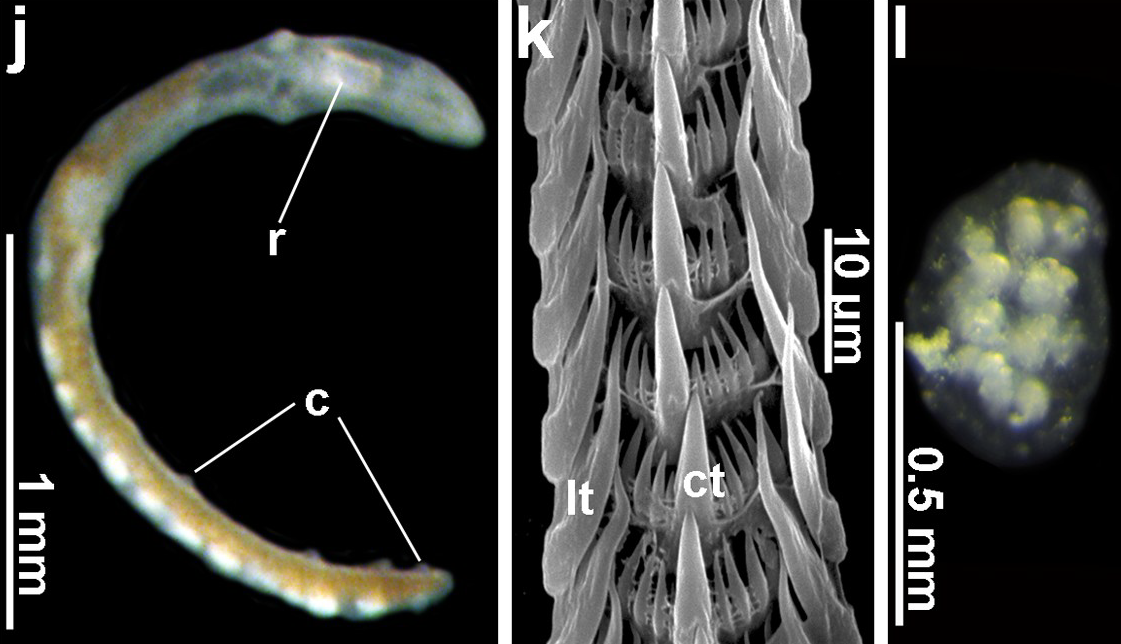
- Pseudovermis paradoxus: habitus (j), lateral teeth (k), and egg mass (l)

Scientific classification
- Kingdom: Animalia
- Phylum: Mollusca
- Class: Gastropoda
- Order: Nudibranchia
- Suborder: Aeolidacea
- Superfamily: Cumanotoidea; Odhner, 1907

Families
- See Taxonomy

= Cumanotoidea =

Superfamily of gastropods

Cumanotoidea is a superfamily of nudibranchs, shell-less marine gastropod molluscs or sea slugs, within the suborder Aeolidacea.

== Taxonomy ==
In 2020, based on morphological and molecular data, the strongly paedomorphic Pseudovermidae was recovered as a sister to Cumanotidae, with the group comprising these sister families placed as sister to superfamilies Aeolidioidea and Flabellinoidea within Aeolidacea.

A 2025 study recovered this same relationship between the two families and established the superfamily Cumanotoidea to include them, with Cumanotoidea placed as sister to the superfamilies Aeolidioidea, Chudoidea, Flabellinoidea, and Flabellinopsoidea.

Cumanotoidea is distinguishable from a majority of Flabellinoidea by the absence of a distinct notal edge, few regular ceratal rows not significantly branched, and special clasping organs in the female component of the reproductive system.

As such, the following families are recognised in the superfamily Cumanotoidea:

- Family Cumanotidae Odhner, 1907
- Family Pseudovermidae Thiele, 1931
