= Piseinotecus gonja =

Scientific classification
- Kingdom: Animalia
- Phylum: Mollusca
- Class: Gastropoda
- Order: Nudibranchia
- Suborder: Aeolidacea
- Family: Piseinotecidae
- Genus: Piseinotecus
- Species: P. gonja

Binomial name
- Piseinotecus gonja Edmunds, 1970

Species of gastropod

Piseinotecus gonja is a species of sea slug, an aeolid nudibranch, a marine gastropod mollusk in the family Piseinotecidae. It has one subspecies, Piseinotecus gonja kima.

== Distribution ==
This nudibranch was described from Oysterbay, Dar es Salaam, Tanzania.

== Description ==
This piseinotecid nudibranch is translucent pale brown in colour and reaches 5 mm in length. The entire body and the lower part of the rhinophores are covered with small, evenly-spaced purple-brown or red-brown spots. On the back there are also white spots and a dense patch of cream on the head. There are bands of dark green on the rhinophores and the oral tentacles. The digestive gland in the cerata is brown and there are irregular cream spots and small brown spots on the surfaces of the cerata. The cerata are slightly tuberculate as in some species of Eubranchus.

== Ecology ==
Piseinotecus gonja feeds on hydroids.
