= Piseinotecus gonja kima =

Scientific classification
- Kingdom: Animalia
- Phylum: Mollusca
- Class: Gastropoda
- Order: Nudibranchia
- Suborder: Aeolidacea
- Family: Piseinotecidae
- Genus: Piseinotecus
- Species: P. g. kima

Binomial name
- Piseinotecus gonja kima Edmunds, 1970

Species of gastropod

Piseinotecus gonja kima is a subspecies of Piseinotecus gonja, a species of aeolid nudibranch sea slug, a marine gastropod mollusk in the family Piseinotecidae.

== Distribution ==
This nudibranch was described from Oysterbay, Dar es Salaam, Tanzania.

== Description ==
This piseinotecid nudibranch is translucent white in colour and reaches 5 mm in length but probably grows larger, as the only known specimen was not fully mature. The entire body and the lower part of the rhinophores are covered with scattered orange-yellow and smaller white spots. The rhinophores and oral tentacles have white spots near the base, followed by a pale green band, then a broad white band and clear tips. The digestive gland in the cerata is pale brown and there are white and small red-brown spots on the surfaces of the cerata. The cerata are slightly tuberculate, as in some species of Eubranchus.

== Ecology ==
Piseinotecus gonja kima feeds on hydroids.
