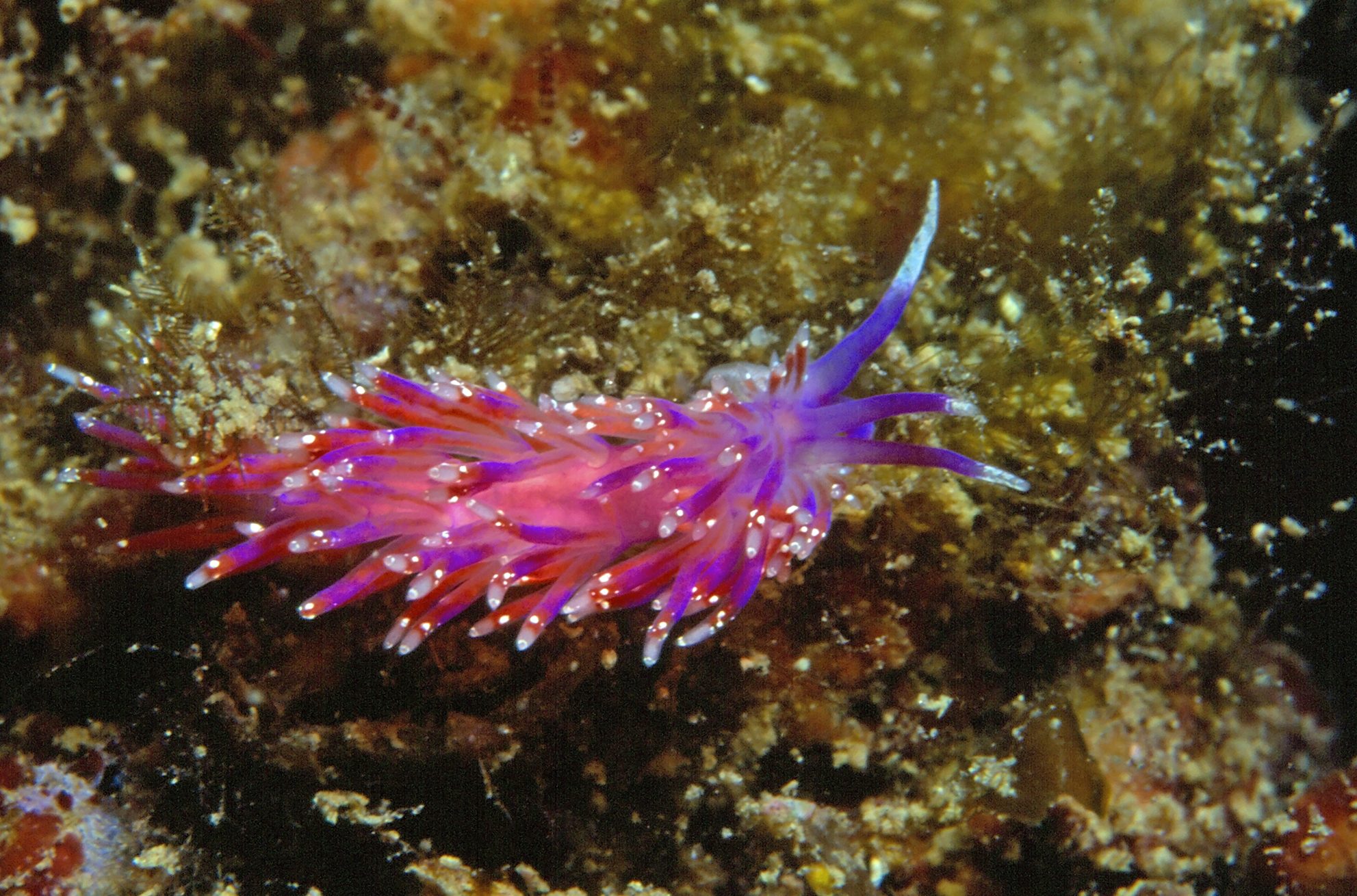
- Phetia soussi

Scientific classification
- Kingdom: Animalia
- Phylum: Mollusca
- Class: Gastropoda
- Order: Nudibranchia
- Suborder: Aeolidacea
- Family: Piseinotecidae
- Genus: Piseinotecus; Marcus, 1955

Type species
- Piseinotecus divae Er. Marcus, 1955

= Piseinotecus =

Genus of gastropods

Piseinotecus is a genus of sea slugs, aeolid nudibranchs, marine gastropod mollusks in the family Piseinotecidae.

== Etymology ==
The name Piseinotecus comes from the Portuguese sentence "pisei no Teco" (I stepped onto Teco). Teco was the name of a dog of the zoologists Ernst Marcus and Eveline Du Bois-Reymond Marcus. While they were looking for a name for the genus, their friend, the zoologist Diva Diniz Corrêa, was visiting them and stated the sentence while coming down the stairs to announce that she had accidentally stepped onto their dog.

== Species ==
Species in the genus Piseinotecus currently include:

- Piseinotecus divae Er. Marcus, 1955
- Piseinotecus ernestina Ortea & Moro, 2020
- Piseinotecus gonja Edmunds, 1970
  - Piseinotecus gonja kima Edmunds, 1970.
- Piseinotecus minipapilla Edmunds, 2015
- Piseinotecus sphaeriferus (Schmekel, 1965)

Ekimova et al. (2026) posits Piseinotecus soussi Tamsouri, Carmona, Moukrim & Cervera, 2014 should be included herein. Korshunova et al. (2025) provided robust evidence for its current designation of Phetia soussi (Tamsouri, Carmona, Moukrim & Cervera, 2014) under family Unidentiidae.

Species brought into synonymy

- Piseinotecus evelinae Schmekel, 1980: synonym of Flabellina gabinierei (Vicente, 1975)
- Piseinotecus gabinierei (Vicente, 1975): synonym of Flabellina gabinierei (Vicente, 1975)
- Piseinotecus gaditanus Cervera, García-Gómez & García, 1987: synonym of Flabellina gaditana (Cervera, García-Gómez & F. J. García, 1987)
