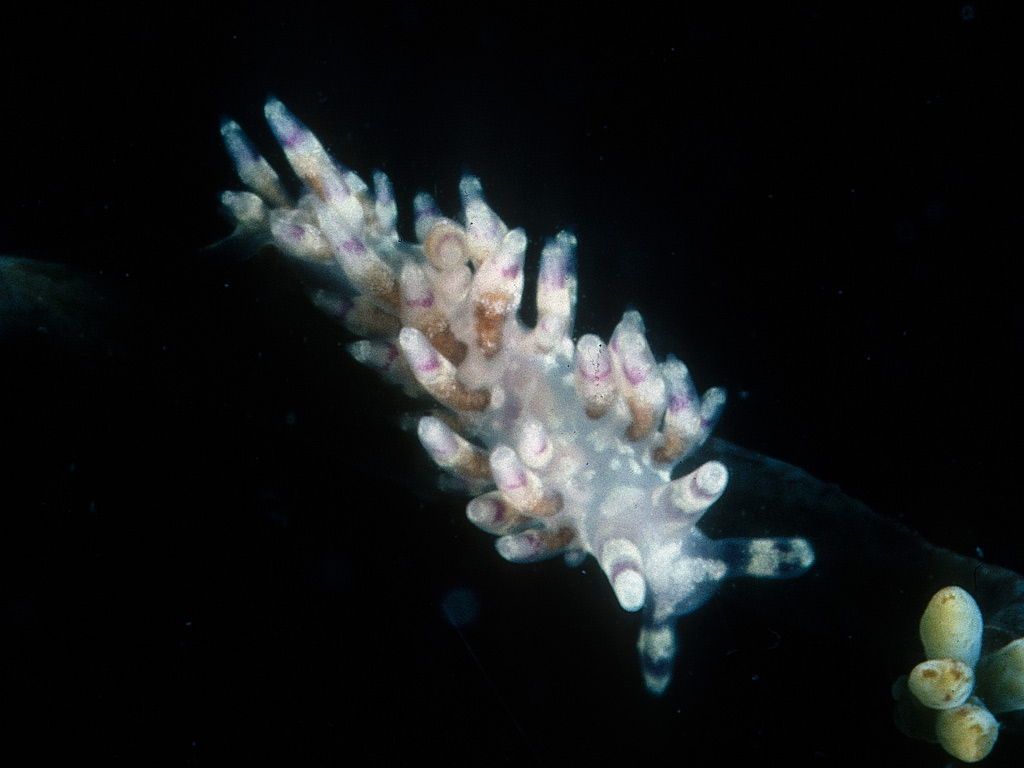
- The nudibranch Abronica purpureoanulata, Kong Chau, Hong Kong.

Scientific classification
- Kingdom: Animalia
- Phylum: Mollusca
- Class: Gastropoda
- Order: Nudibranchia
- Suborder: Aeolidacea
- Superfamily: Fionoidea
- Family: Abronicidae
- Genus: Abronica
- Species: A. purpureoanulata

Binomial name
- Abronica purpureoanulata (Baba, 1961)

Synonyms
- Catriona purpureoanulata Baba, 1961; Cuthona purpureoanulata (Baba, 1961)

= Abronica purpureoanulata =

Species of gastropod

Abronica purpureoanulata is a species of sea slug, an aeolid nudibranch, a marine gastropod mollusc in the family Abronicidae.

== Distribution ==
This species was described from Seto Marine Biological Laboratory, Kii Peninsula and Tannowa, Osaka Bay, south coast of Honshu, Japan. It has also been reported from Hayama, Sagami Bay; Mukaishima, Seto Inland Sea; Awashima, Niigata Prefecture; Mera, Fukui Prefecture and Tsuruga Bay. As well as these localities in Japan it has been found in Hong Kong.

== Migration ==
Abronica purpureoanulata migrates from the Sea of Japan down to Taiwan in the winter months as they are unable to survive the freezing temperatures.
