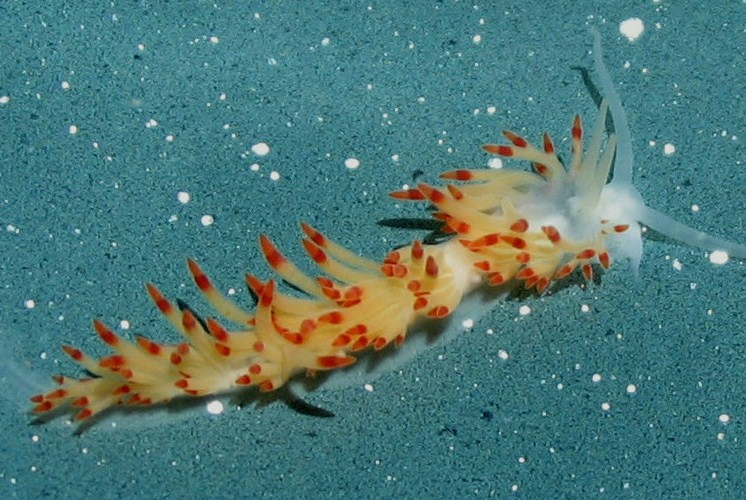

Scientific classification
- Kingdom: Animalia
- Phylum: Mollusca
- Class: Gastropoda
- Order: Nudibranchia
- Suborder: Aeolidacea
- Family: Piseinotecidae
- Genus: Pacifia
- Species: P. goddardi

Binomial name
- Pacifia goddardi (Gosliner, 2010)

Synonyms
- Flabellina goddardi Gosliner, 2010

= Pacifia goddardi =

Species of gastropod

Pacifia goddardi is a species of sea slug, an aeolid nudibranch, a marine gastropod mollusc in the family Piseinotecidae. This species was recently discovered by Jeff Goddard, and named by his friend, Terry Gosliner. It was found while searching for another species in Carpinteria State Beach in Santa Barbara, California.

== Description ==
The body is translucent white, with mature specimens being approximately 33 mm long. It has smooth rhinophores, with orange-tipped, subapical red bands on the cerata.

It produces eggs in a long, convoluted ribbon, which hatch into planktotrophic veliger larvae.

== Distribution ==
Pacifia goddardi was described from the intertidal zone of Carpinteria State Beach, California. It has also been found at 9 m depth in Las Flores Canyon, off Malibu, at 18 m depth on the south side of West Anacapa Island and at 9 m depth off Point Dume, Malibu, California.
