= Pseudovermis hancocki =

Scientific classification
- Kingdom: Animalia
- Phylum: Mollusca
- Class: Gastropoda
- Order: Nudibranchia
- Suborder: Aeolidacea
- Family: Pseudovermidae
- Genus: Pseudovermis
- Species: P. hancocki

Binomial name
- Pseudovermis hancocki Challis, 1969

Species of gastropod

Pseudovermis hancocki is species of minute sea slug, specifically an aeolid nudibranch, a marine gastropod mollusc or micromollusk in the family Pseudovermidae.

These extremely small sea slugs are meiofauna; they live among sand grains.
