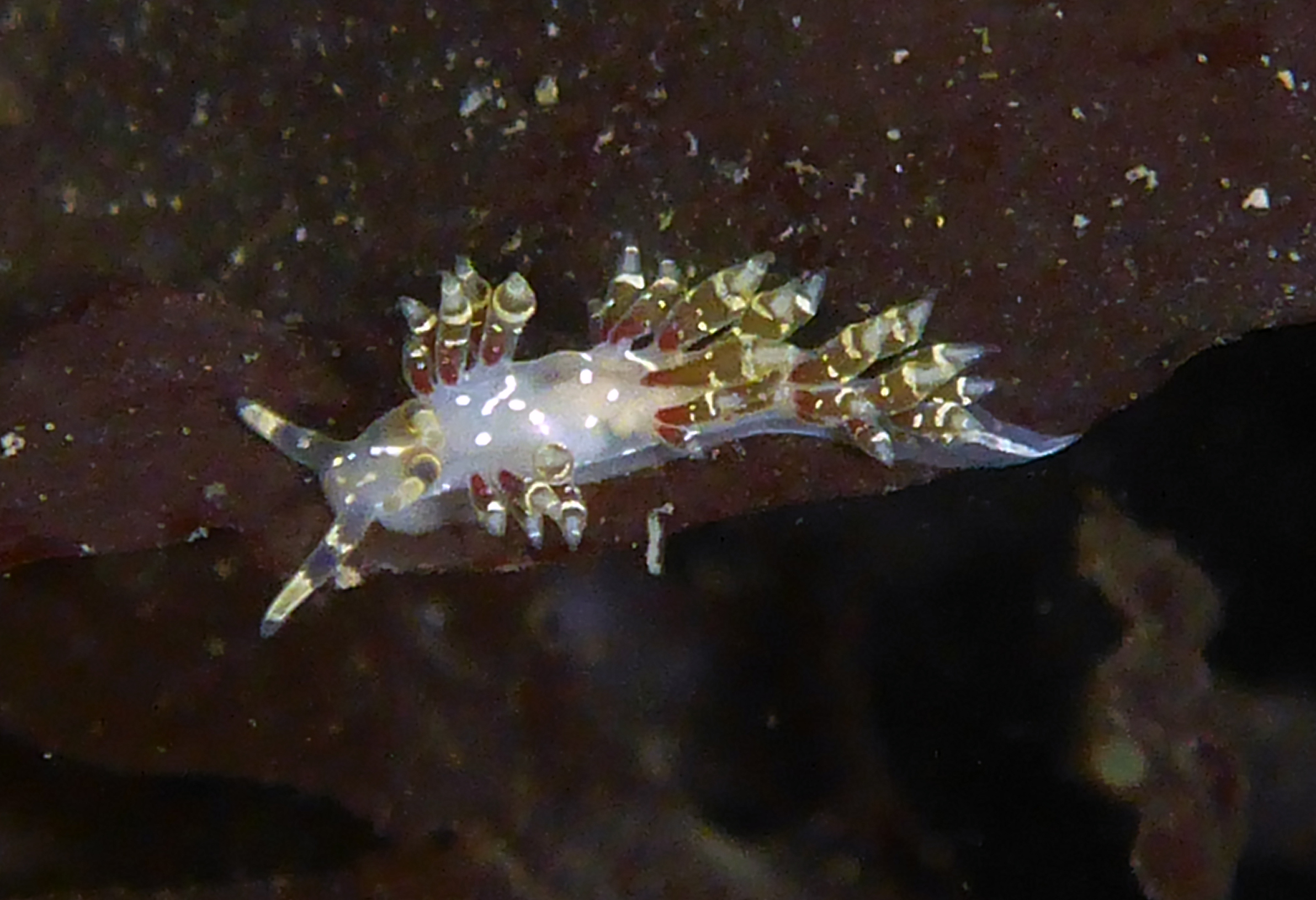

Scientific classification
- Kingdom: Animalia
- Phylum: Mollusca
- Class: Gastropoda
- Order: Nudibranchia
- Suborder: Aeolidacea
- Superfamily: Fionoidea
- Family: Abronicidae
- Genus: Abronica
- Species: A. abronia

Binomial name
- Abronica abronia (MacFarland, 1966)

Synonyms
- Cratena abronia MacFarland, 1966; Cuthona abronia MacFarland, 1966

= Abronica abronia =

Species of gastropod

Abronica abronia, common name graceful aeolid, is a species of sea slug, an aeolid nudibranch, a marine gastropod mollusc in the family Abronicidae.

== Distribution ==
This species was described from Point Pinos, Monterey Bay, California, U.S. It has been recorded along the Eastern Pacific coastline of North America from Washington state to Baja California, Mexico.
