= Flabellina gabinierei =

Scientific classification
- Kingdom: Animalia
- Phylum: Mollusca
- Class: Gastropoda
- Order: Nudibranchia
- Suborder: Aeolidacea
- Family: Flabellinidae
- Genus: Flabellina
- Species: F. gabinierei

Binomial name
- Flabellina gabinierei (Vicente, 1976)

Synonyms
- Facelina gabinierei Vicente, 1976 original combination; Paraflabellina gabinierei (Vincente. 1975); Piseinotecus evelinae Schmekel, 1980; Piseinotecus gabinierei (Vincente, 1975)

Species of gastropod

Flabellina gabinierei (Ghost Aeolid) is a species of sea slug, an aeolid nudibranch, a marine gastropod mollusk in the family Flabellinidae.

== Distribution ==
This nudibranch was described from the islet of La Gabinière, Port-Cros National Park, France. It has since been found in La Ciotat, France, Antalya, Turkey, and Cadaques, Spain

== Description ==
This nudibranch is translucent white in colour and reaches 30 mm in length. The tips of the rhinophores, oral tentacles and tail are dusted with white. The digestive gland in the cerata is dark brown, green or possibly red and there is no pigment on the surfaces of the cerata. The rhinophores have small annular wrinkles.

== Ecology ==
Flabellina gabinierei feeds on hydroids of the genus Eudendrium.
