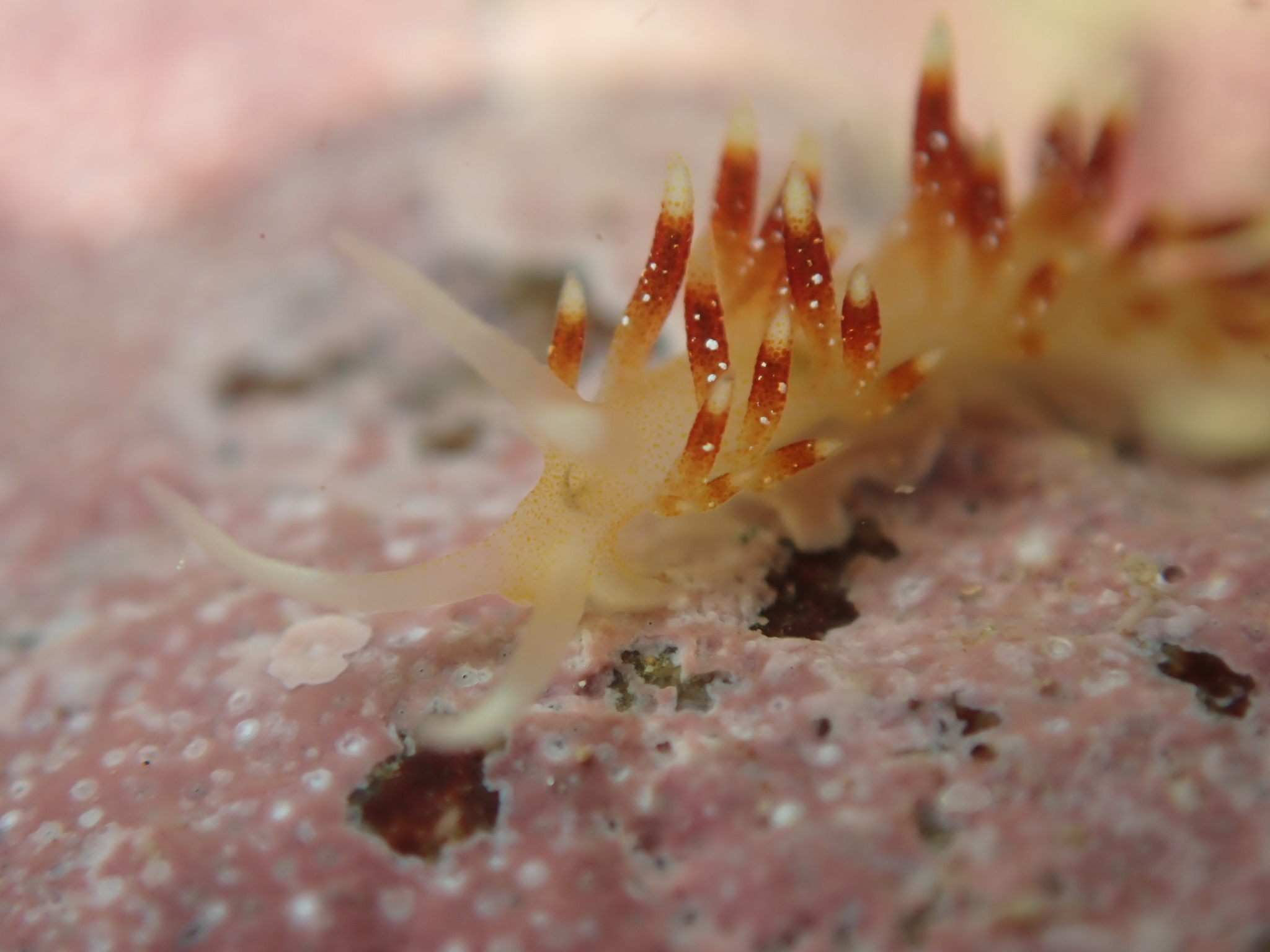
- Tularia bractea

Scientific classification
- Kingdom: Animalia
- Phylum: Mollusca
- Class: Gastropoda
- Order: Nudibranchia
- Suborder: Aeolidacea
- Family: Apataidae
- Genus: Tularia; Burn, 1966

= Tularia =

Genus of gastropods

Tularia is a genus of sea slugs, aeolid nudibranchs, marine gastropod mollusks in the family Apataidae.

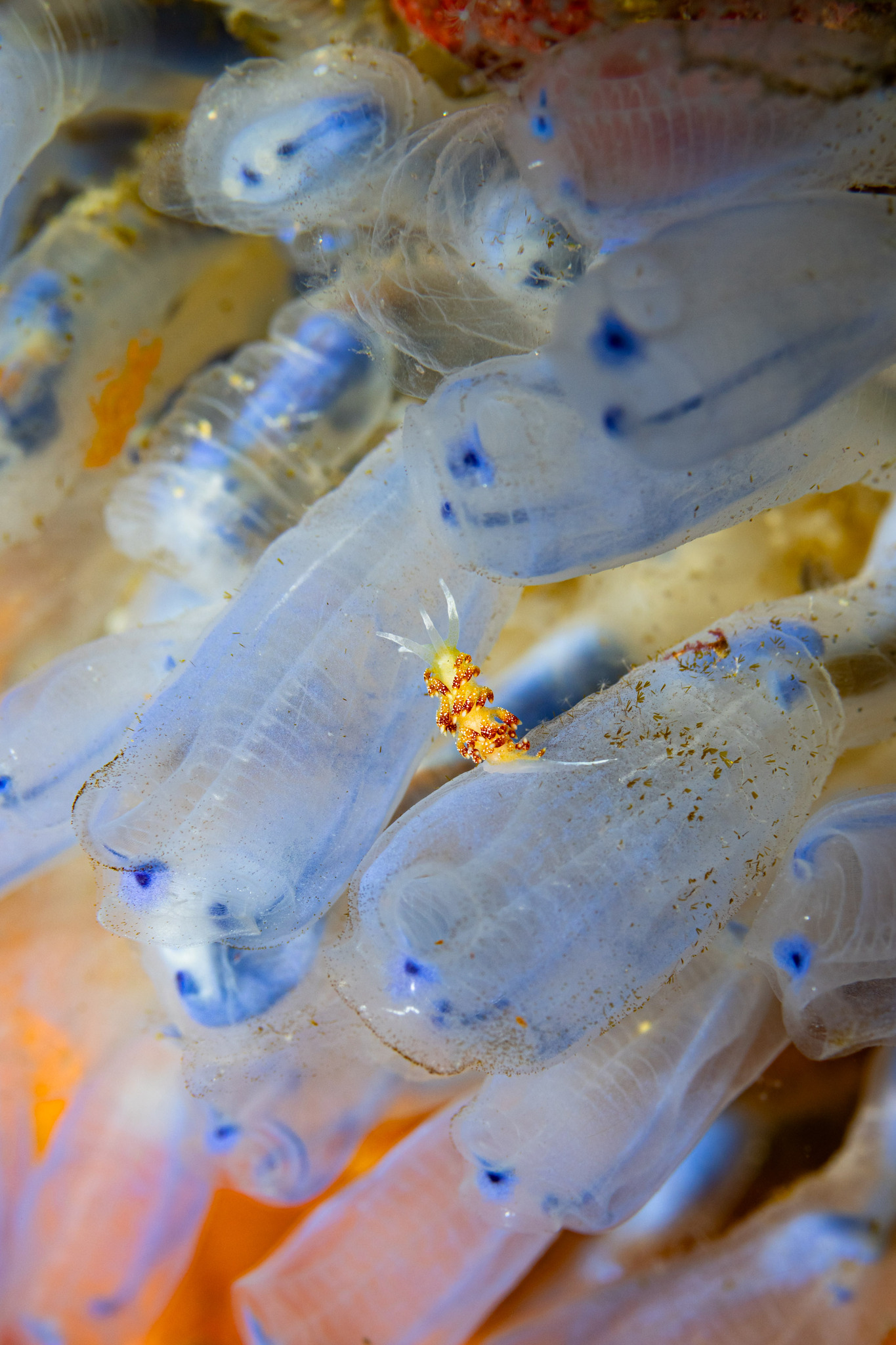
Tularia bractea on Clavelina

== Species ==
There is only one species within the genus Tularia:

- Tularia bractea (Burn, 1962)

== Distribution ==
This species was described from Australia. It is known only from temperate waters in the south of Australia and New Zealand.
