= Cumanotus cuenoti =

Scientific classification
- Kingdom: Animalia
- Phylum: Mollusca
- Class: Gastropoda
- Order: Nudibranchia
- Suborder: Aeolidacea
- Family: Cumanotidae
- Genus: Cumanotus
- Species: C. cuenoti

Binomial name
- Cumanotus cuenoti Pruvot-Fol, 1948

Species of gastropod

Cumanotus cuenoti is a species of sea slug, an aeolid nudibranch, a marine gastropod mollusc in the family Cumanotidae.

== Distribution ==
This species was described from the Bay of Arcachon, France, 44.6788°N 1.1917°W. It is not known from elsewhere.
