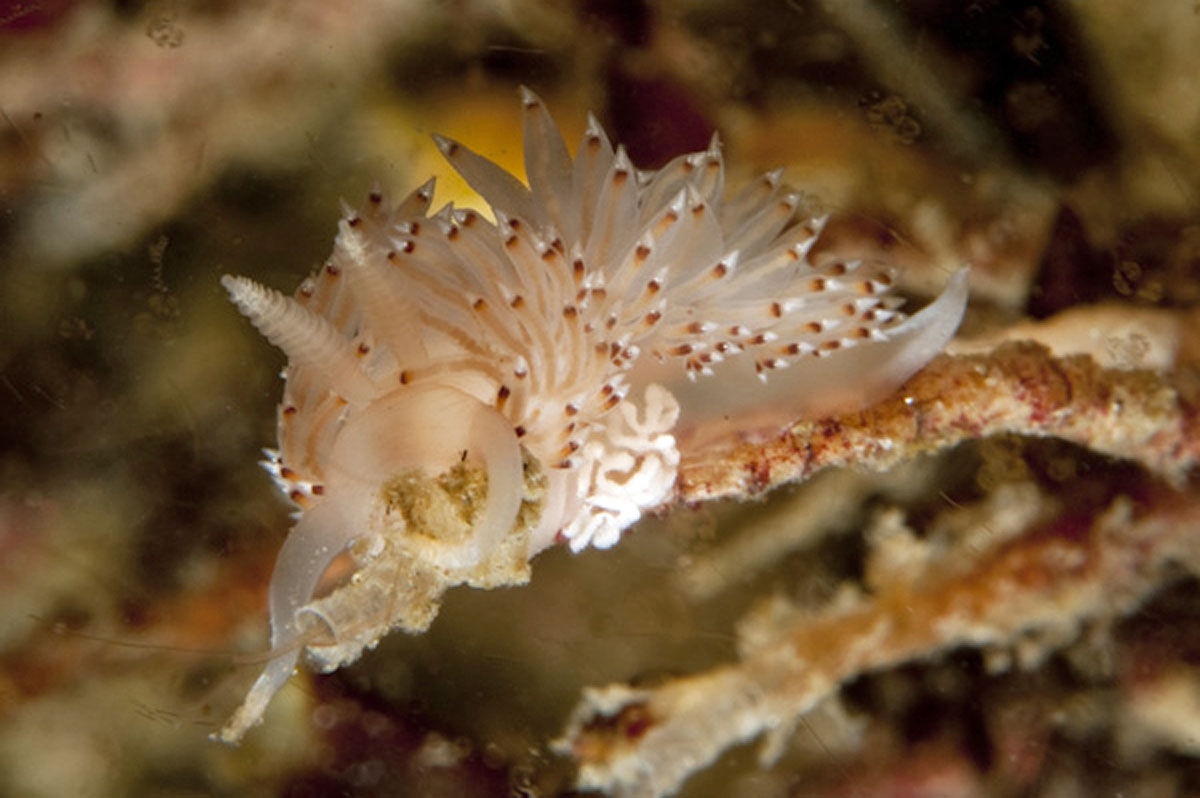
- Apata pricei

Scientific classification
- Kingdom: Animalia
- Phylum: Mollusca
- Class: Gastropoda
- Order: Nudibranchia
- Suborder: Aeolidacea
- Family: Apataidae
- Genus: Apata
- Species: A. pricei

Binomial name
- Apata pricei (MacFarland, 1966)

Synonyms
- Coryphella pricei MacFarland, 1966; Flabellina pricei (MacFarland, 1966)

= Apata pricei =

Species of gastropod

Apata pricei (also known as "Price's Aeolid") is a species of sea slug, an aeolid nudibranch, a marine heterobranch mollusc in the family Apataidae.

== Description ==
This species of flabellinid has the cerata in neat, well-defined rows. The body colour is translucent white with a pinkish hue. The cerata become orange in the outer third with a red tip to the digestive gland and a small spot or ring of opaque white at the cnidosac. The rhinophores are annulate. F. pricei have a maximum length of 25mm.

== Distribution ==
The type locality of this species is Monterey Bay, California where it was found rarely, in rock pools on the shore. The species is reported from the Northeast Pacific Ocean on the North American coast from Ketchikan, Alaska to La Jolla, California.

== Diet ==
This species has been reported to feed on the hydroids, Halecium and Corymorpha palma.
