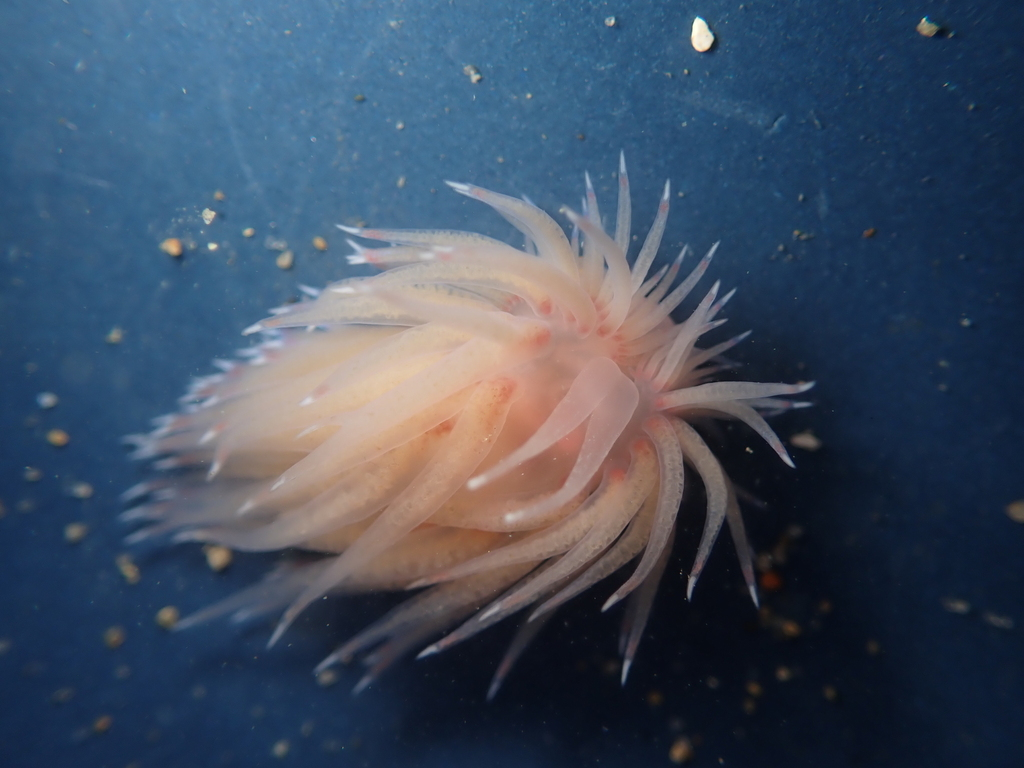

Scientific classification
- Kingdom: Animalia
- Phylum: Mollusca
- Class: Gastropoda
- Order: Nudibranchia
- Suborder: Aeolidacea
- Family: Cumanotidae
- Genus: Cumanotus
- Species: C. fernaldi

Binomial name
- Cumanotus fernaldi Thompson & Brown, 1984

Synonyms
- Cumanotus beaumonti Hurst, 1967, non. Eliot, 1906

= Cumanotus fernaldi =

Species of gastropod

Cumanotus fernaldi is a species of sea slug, an aeolid nudibranch, a marine gastropod mollusc in the family Cumanotidae.

== Distribution ==
This species was described from the San Juan Islands, British Columbia, Canada, 48.568625°N 123.005766°W.
