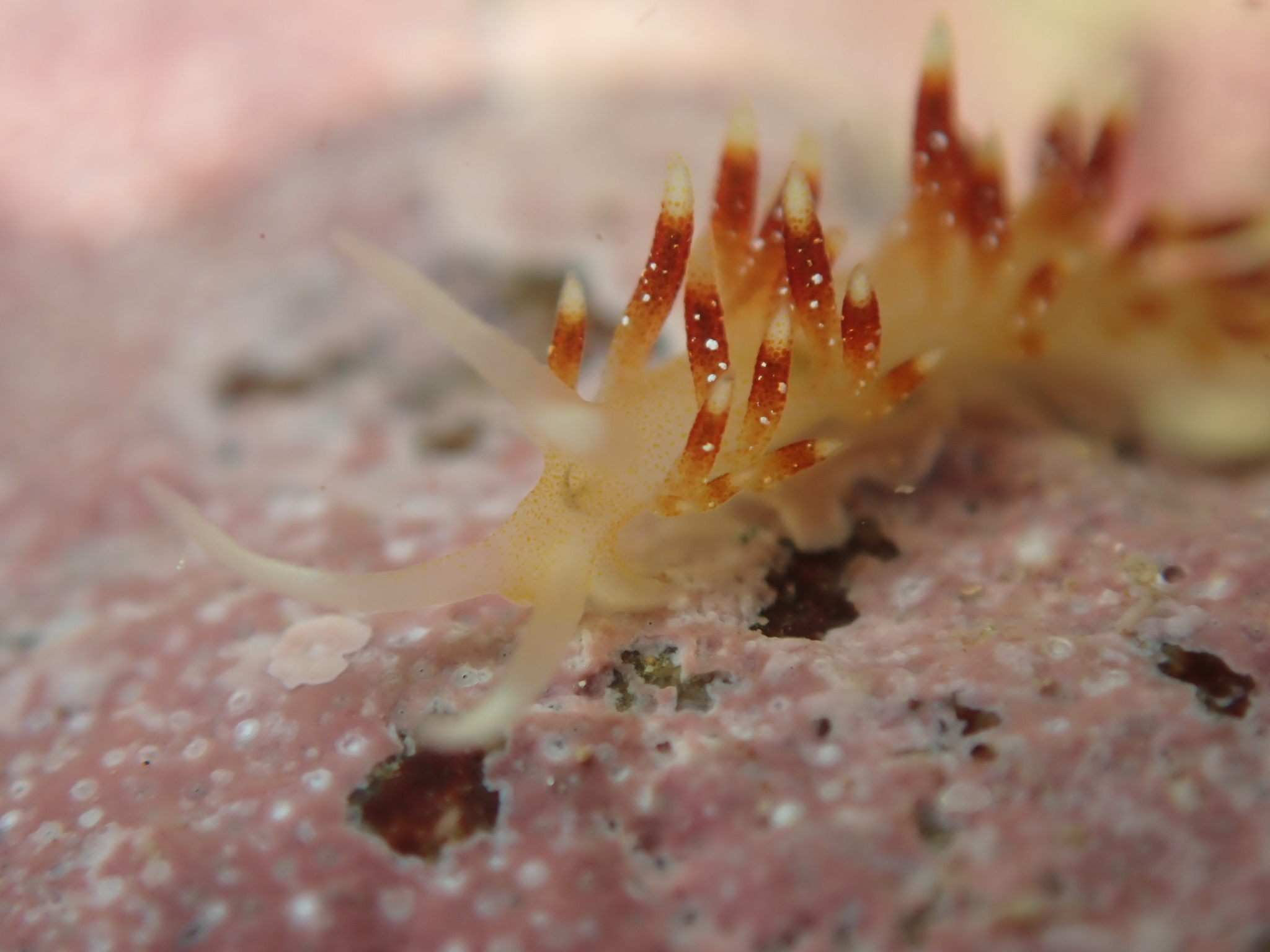

Scientific classification
- Kingdom: Animalia
- Phylum: Mollusca
- Class: Gastropoda
- Order: Nudibranchia
- Suborder: Aeolidacea
- Family: Apataidae
- Genus: Tularia
- Species: T. bractea

Binomial name
- Tularia bractea (Burn, 1962)

Synonyms
- Cuthona bractea Burn, 1962

= Tularia bractea =

Species of gastropod

Tularia bractea is a species of sea slug, an aeolid nudibranch, a marine gastropod mollusc in the family Apataidae.

== Distribution ==
This species was described from Australia. It is known only from temperate waters in the south of Australia and New Zealand.
