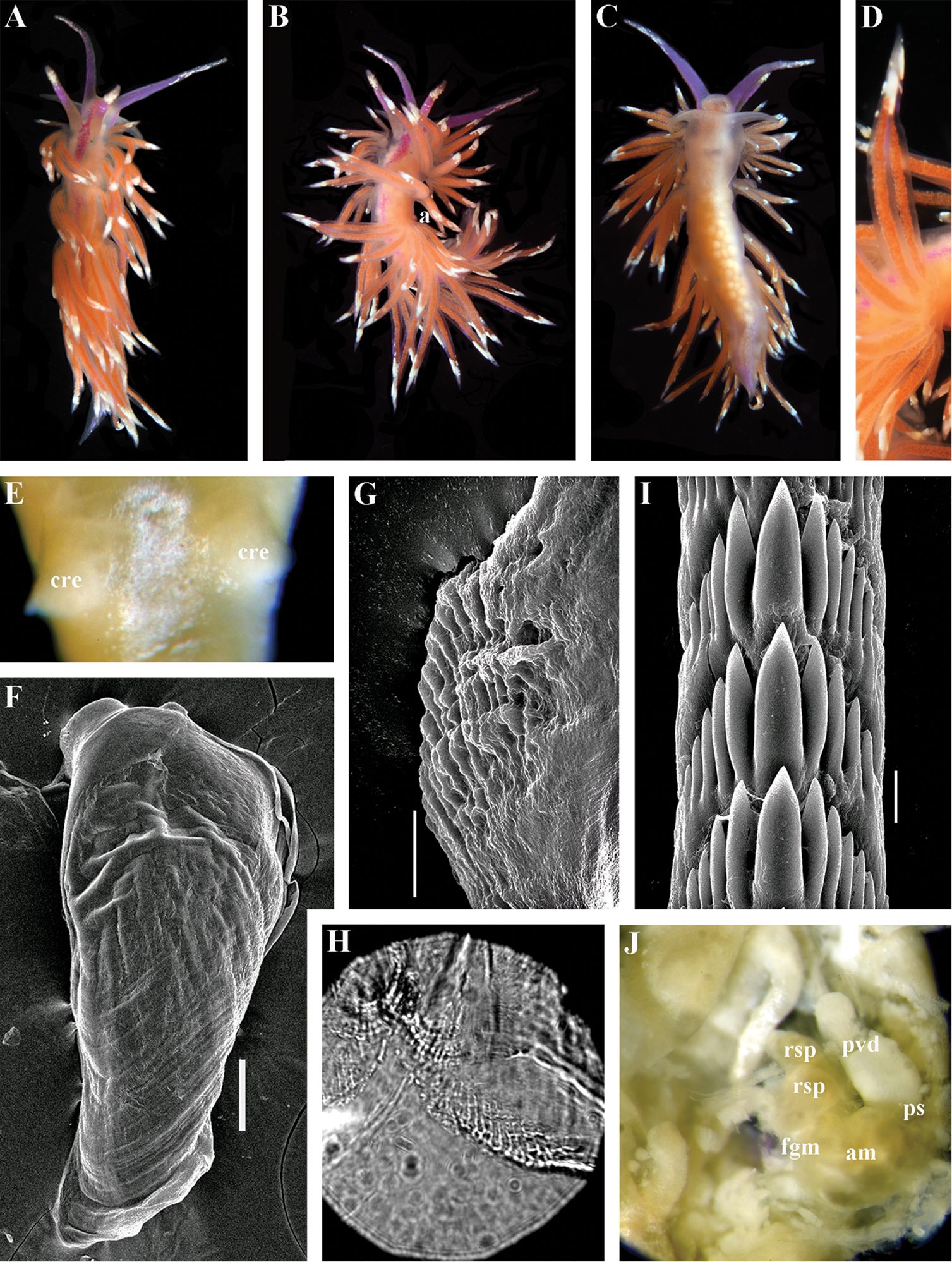
- Unidentia nihonrossija

Scientific classification
- Kingdom: Animalia
- Phylum: Mollusca
- Class: Gastropoda
- Order: Nudibranchia
- Suborder: Aeolidacea
- Superfamily: Unidentioidea
- Family: Unidentiidae; Millen & Hermosillo, 2012

Genera
- See text

= Unidentiidae =

Family of gastropods

Unidentiidae is a taxonomic family of sea slugs, specifically aeolid nudibranchs, marine gastropod molluscs in the superfamily Unidentioidea.

== Classifcation status ==
Under Korshunova et al. (2025), Unidentiidae is placed under the superfamily Unidentioidea. Unidentiidae is a very unique family, representing "a bizarre combination of several traits" that can be found across the main Aeolidacean superfamilies, a phenomenon referred to as "mosaic" traits. It found some support that Unidentiidae was sister to Fionoidea, but not the highest support. Given that Unidentiidae never fit well within any superfamily, Unidentioidea was established therein to contain it. The additional genus Phetia was added to the family to contain the species previously known as Piseinotecus soussi, as there was strong support for it clustering with Unidentiid genera. Additionally, Korshunova et al. determined that the study that established P. soussi included a fully incorrect analysis of its reproductive system, which is what led to its erroneous placement in Piseinotecus in the first place. The rest of Piseinotecus and its family Piseinotecidae was declared superfamilia incertae sedis under Aeolidacea due to lack of data on the much rarer species therein.

Recently, Ekimova et al. (2026) instead "tentatively" suggests Piseinotecidae to be a senior synonym of Unidentiidae, as previously established diagnostics for Piseinotecidae appeared to agree fully with Unidentiidae. The study acknowledges hasty synonymy without molecular data is often a poor idea due to possibly unknown convergences, but at the same time considers maintaining separate families due to lack of molecular data to be an impractical precedent to set. Additionally, the study agrees it seems likely that Piseinotecus soussi does require its own genus separate from Piseinotecus, but chooses not to recognise Phetia as valid without more data from other Piseinotecus species.

Additionally, while Piseinotecidae (and thus, the synonimzed Unidentiidae) was placed under Fionoidea in Ekimova et al. 2026, all analysis was done at only a familial level and narrower, without any discussion of superfamilies.

== Genera ==
Genera and species within the family Unidentiidae include:

- Pacifia Korshunova, Martynov, Bakken, Evertsen, Fletcher, Mudianta, Saito, Lundin, Schrödl & Picton, 2017
- Phetia Korshunova, Fletcher & Martynov, 2025
- Unidentia Millen & Hermosillo, 2012
