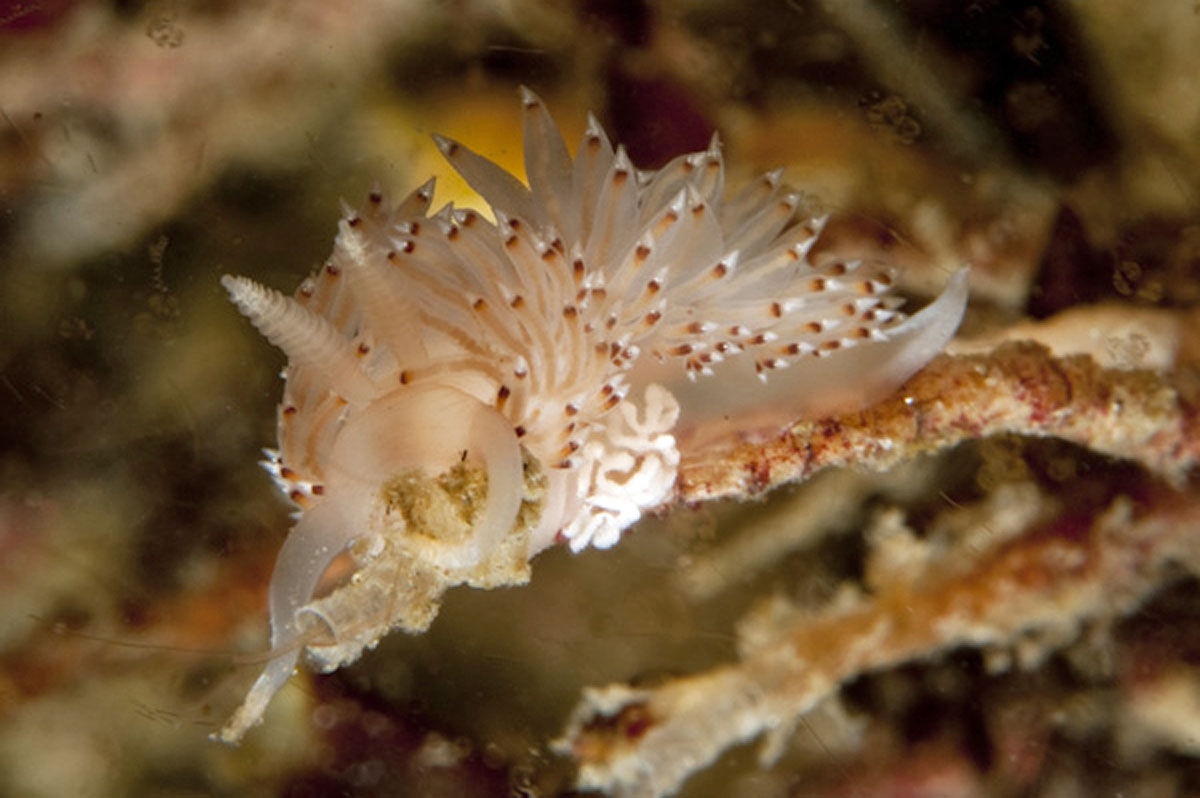

Scientific classification
- Kingdom: Animalia
- Phylum: Mollusca
- Class: Gastropoda
- Order: Nudibranchia
- Suborder: Aeolidacea
- Family: Apataidae
- Genus: Apata; Korshunova, Martynov, Bakken, Evertsen, Fletcher, Mudianta, Saito, Lundin, Schrödl & Picton, 2017

= Apata (gastropod) =

Genus of gastropods

Apata is a genus of sea slugs, specifically aeolid nudibranchs, marine gastropod molluscs in the family Apataidae.

== Species ==
Species within the genus Apata are as follows:

- Apata pricei (MacFarland, 1966)
