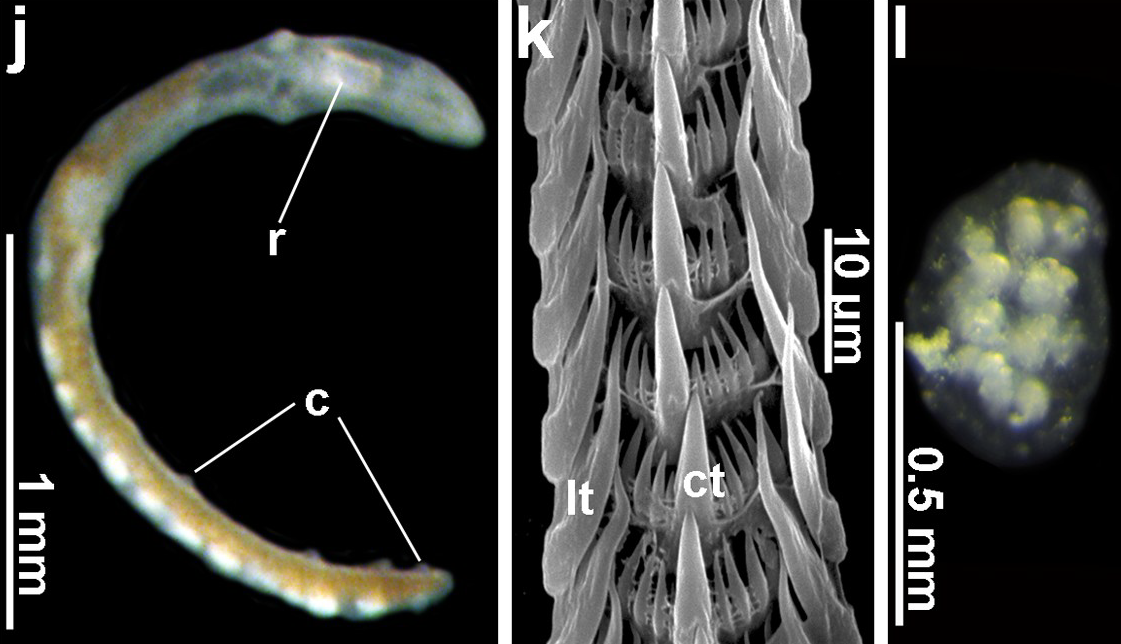
- Habitus of Pseudovermis paradoxus (j), its lateral teeth (k), and egg mass (l)

Scientific classification
- Kingdom: Animalia
- Phylum: Mollusca
- Class: Gastropoda
- Order: Nudibranchia
- Suborder: Aeolidacea
- Family: Pseudovermidae
- Genus: Pseudovermis; Perejaslavtseva, 1891

= Pseudovermis =

Genus of gastropods

Pseudovermis is genus of minute sea slugs, specifically aolid nudibranchs, marine gastropod mollusks or micromollusks in the family Pseudovermidae. These extremely small sea slugs are meiofauna; they live among sand grains. Pseudovermis means fake worm, because these slugs resemble minute worms.

== Species ==
Species within the genus Pseudovermis include:

- Pseudovermis artabrensis Urgorri, Cobo & Besteiro, 1991
- Pseudovermis axi Marcus Ev. & Er., 1955
- Pseudovermis boadeni Salvini-Plawen & Sterrer, 1968
- Pseudovermis chinensis Hughes, 1991
- Pseudovermis hancocki Challis, 1969
- Pseudovermis indicus Salvini-Plawen & G.C. Rao, 1973
- Pseudovermis japonicus Hamatani & Nunomura, 1973
- Pseudovermis mortoni Challis, 1969
- Pseudovermis papillifer Kowalewsky, 1901
- Pseudovermis paradoxus Perejaslavtseva, 1891
- Pseudovermis salamandrops Ev. Marcus, 1953
- Pseudovermis schultzi Marcus Ev. & Er., 1955
- Pseudovermis soleatus Salvini-Plawen & G.C. Rao, 1973

Species brought into synonymy

- Pseudovermis kowalewskyi Salvini-Plawen & Sterrer, 1968: synonym of Pseudovermis paradoxus Perejaslavtseva, 1891
- Pseudovermis papillifera Kowalevsky, 1901: synonym of Pseudovermis papillifer Kowalewsky, 1901
- Pseudovermis setensis Fize, 1961: synonym of Pseudovermis paradoxus Perejaslavtseva, 1891
- Pseudovermis thompsoni Salvini-Plawen, 1991: synonym of Pseudovermis boadeni Salvini-Plawen & Sterrer, 1968
