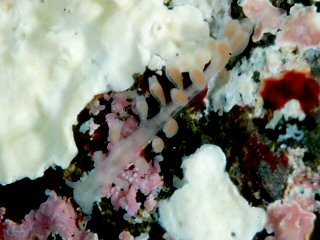

Scientific classification
- Kingdom: Animalia
- Phylum: Mollusca
- Class: Gastropoda
- Order: Nudibranchia
- Suborder: Aeolidacea
- Family: Embletoniidae
- Genus: Embletonia
- Species: E. gracilis

Binomial name
- Embletonia gracilis Risbec 1928

Synonyms
- Embletonia paucipapillata Baba & Hamatani, 1963; Embletonia gracile

= Embletonia gracilis =

Species of gastropod

Embletonia gracilis is a species of sea slug, a dorid nudibranch shell-less mollusk in the family Embletoniidae.

== Description ==
Embletonia gracilis is translucent white, and has been described to be less than 8mm, but can grow to be 20-30mm in length. They have an elongated shape and a single row of cerata, which divide into four parts at the tip, containing nematocysts. They do not have oral tentacles and instead, flat oral lobes next to the mouth. Several studies suggest that they eat hydroids.

== Distribution ==
The species has a large distribution across the West Indo-Pacific.
