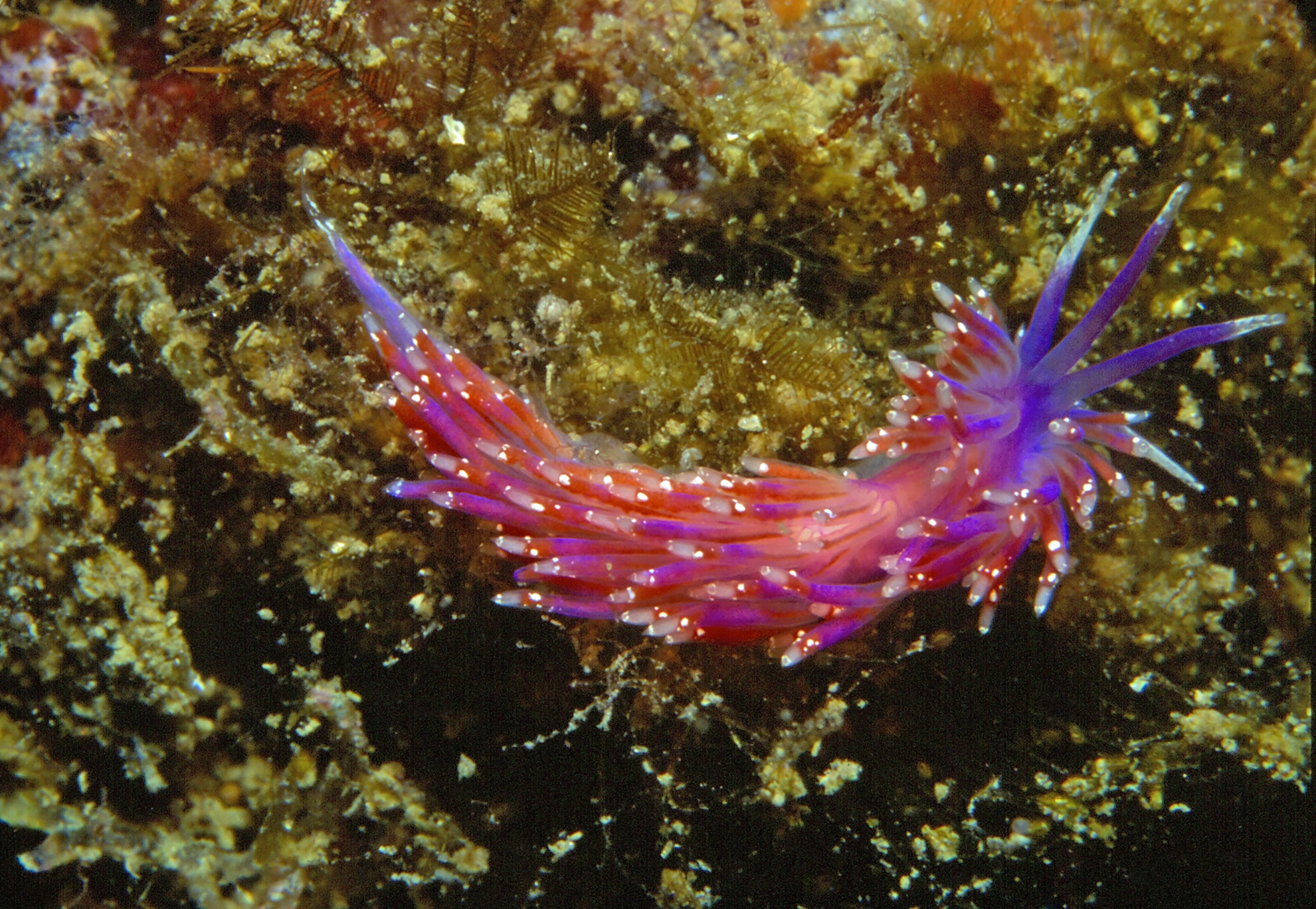
- Phetia soussi from Banyuls-sur-Mer

Scientific classification
- Kingdom: Animalia
- Phylum: Mollusca
- Class: Gastropoda
- Order: Nudibranchia
- Suborder: Aeolidacea
- Family: Unidentiidae
- Genus: Phetia
- Species: P. soussi

Binomial name
- Phetia soussi (Tamsouri, Carmona, Moukrim & Cervera, 2014)

Synonyms
- Piseinotecus soussi Tamsouri, Carmona, Moukrim & Cervera, 2014

= Phetia soussi =

Species of gastropod

Phetia soussi is a species of sea slug, an aeolid nudibranch, a marine gastropod mollusc in the family Unidentiidae.

== Distribution ==
This nudibranch was described from Cap Ghir, Agadir, Morocco. It is also found in Italy and on the Spanish coast and in France at Banyuls-sur-Mer.

== Description ==
This nudibranch is translucent white in colour, with a pink-purple hue throughout the body. The tips of the rhinophores, oral tentacles and tail are tipped with white. The digestive gland in the cerata is usually red and there is purple surface iridescence on the outer part of the cerata. Each ceras has several white spots around the tip, just below the cnidosac.

Korshunova et al. (2025) states that Tamsouri et al.'s original description of the reproductive system of P. soussi was incorrect, and the false representation of such important diagnostic criteria largely contributed to the erroneous placement of the species within genus Piseinotecus and family Piseinotecidae.

== Ecology ==
Phetia soussi feeds on hydroids. It is found in rock pools and in shallow water.
