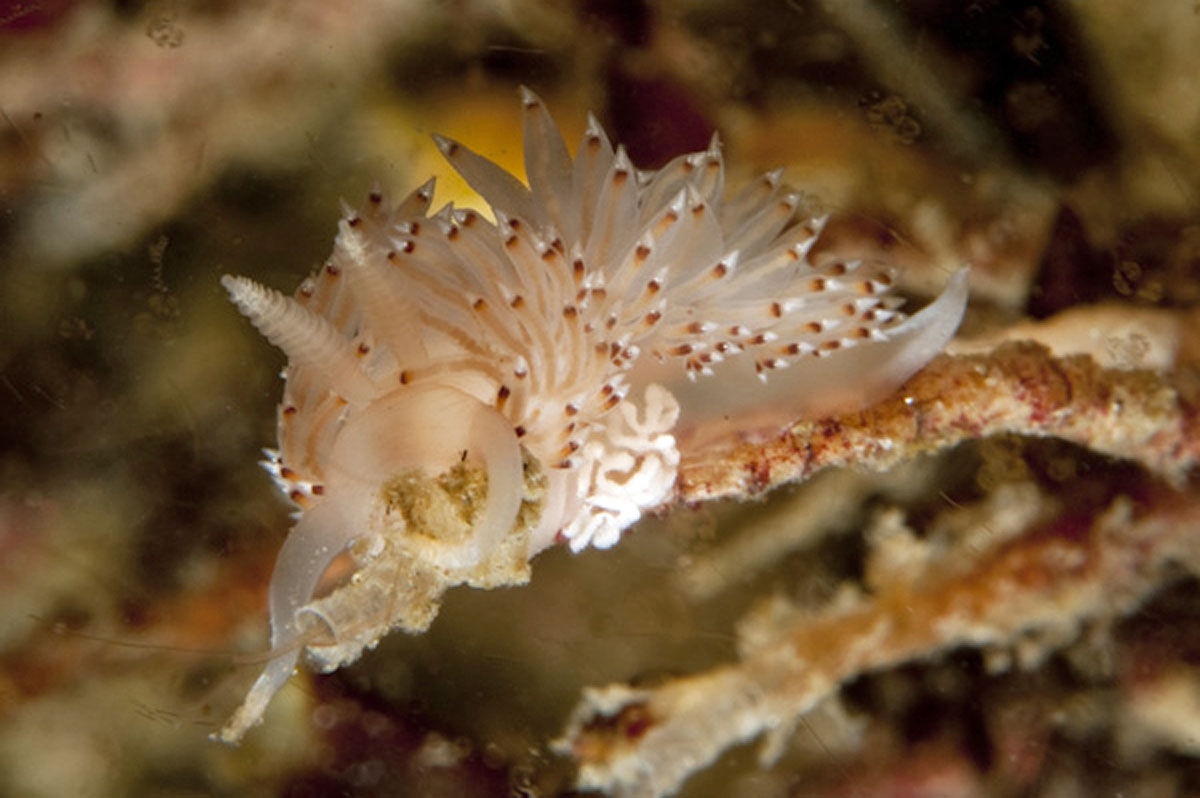
- Apata pricei
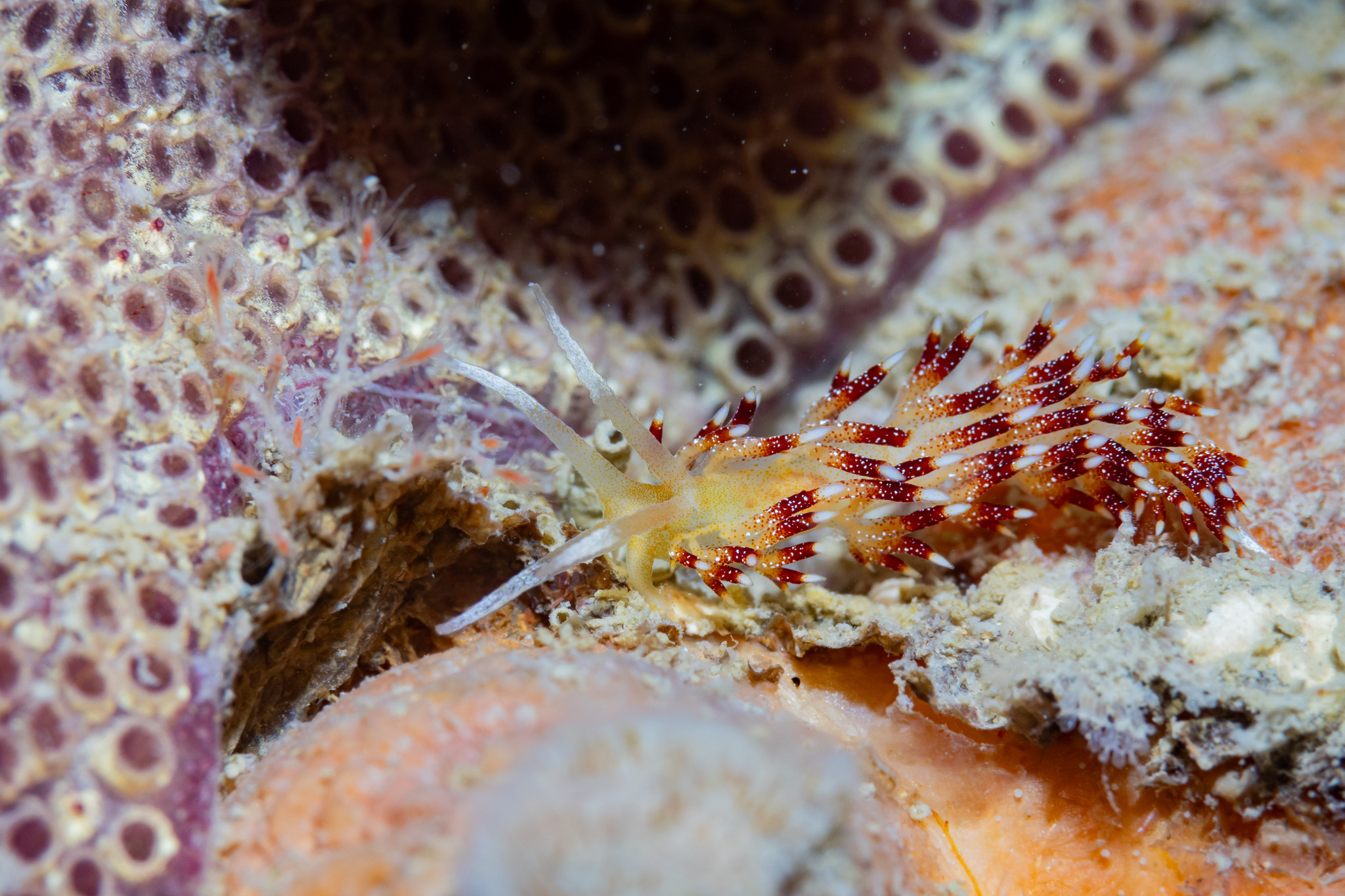
- Tularia bractea

Scientific classification
- Kingdom: Animalia
- Phylum: Mollusca
- Class: Gastropoda
- Order: Nudibranchia
- Suborder: Aeolidacea
- Superfamily: Apataoidea; Korshunova, Martynov, Bakken, Evertsen, Fletcher, Mudianta, Saito, Lundin, Schrödl & Picton, 2017
- Family: Apataidae; Korshunova, Martynov, Bakken, Evertsen, Fletcher, Mudianta, Saito, Lundin, Schrödl & Picton, 2017

Type genus
- Apata Korshunova, Martynov, Bakken, Evertsen, Fletcher, Mudianta, Saito, Lundin, Schrödl & Picton, 2017

Genera
- See Genera

= Apataidae =

Family of gastropods

Apataidae is a family of nudibranchs, shell-less marine gastropod molluscs or sea slugs. It is the only family within the superfamily Apataoidea.

== Genera ==
According to Korshunova and colleagues (2025), the following genera and species are recognised in the family Apataidae:

- Apata Korshunova, Martynov, Bakken, Evertsen, Fletcher, Mudianta, Saito, Lundin, Schrödl & Picton, 2017
- ?Tularia Burn, 1966
