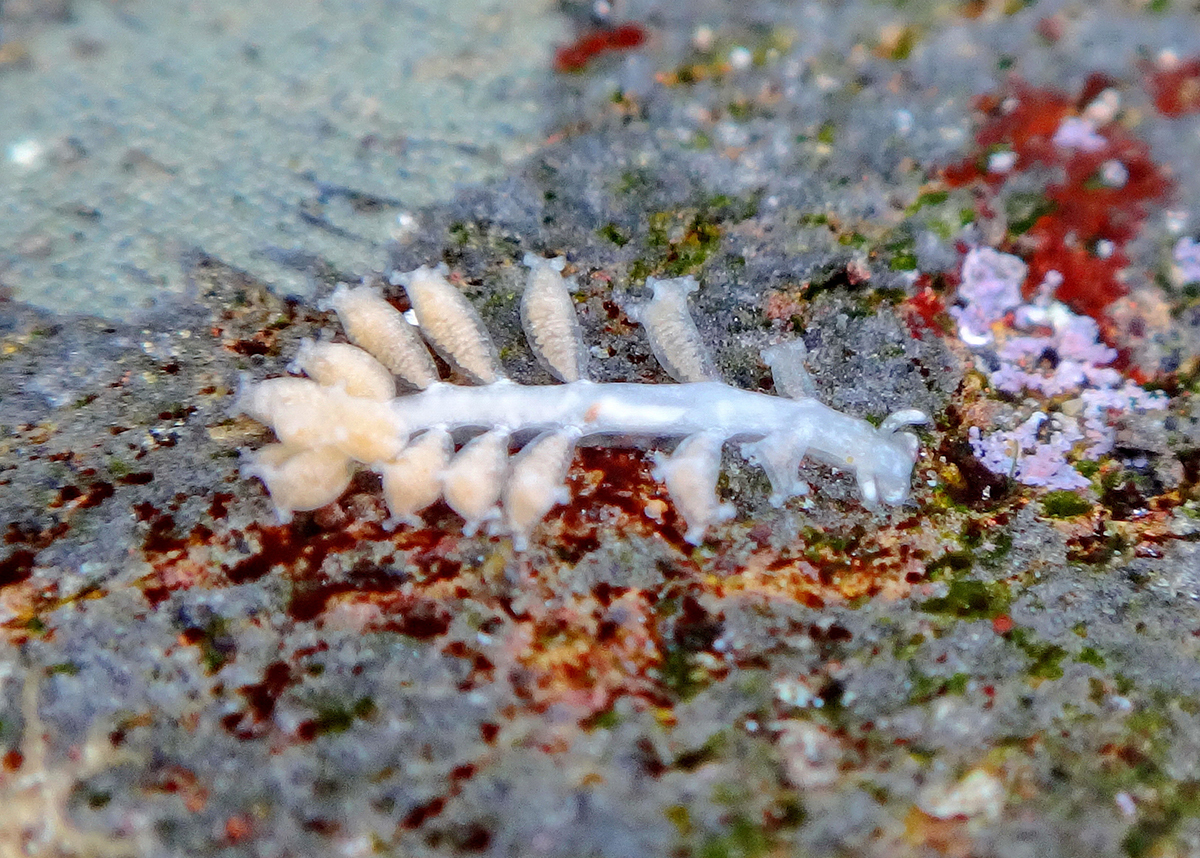
- Embletonia gracilis
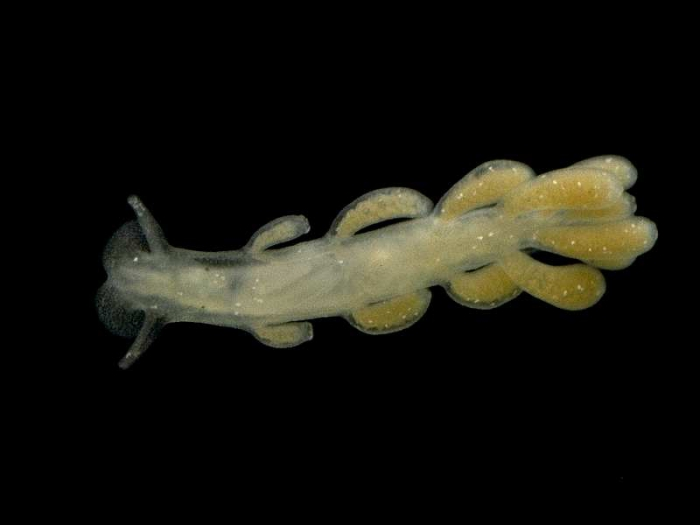
- Embletonia pulchra

Scientific classification
- Kingdom: Animalia
- Phylum: Mollusca
- Class: Gastropoda
- Order: Nudibranchia
- Suborder: Aeolidacea
- Superfamily: Embletonioidea; Pruvot-Fol, 1954
- Family: Embletoniidae; Pruvot-Fol, 1954
- Genus: Embletonia; Alder & Hancock, 1851

Type species
- Pterochilus pulcher Alder & Hancock, 1844

Synonyms
- Genus synonymy: Embletoniella Baba, 1967; Pterochilus Alder & Hancock, 1844

= Embletonia =

Genus of gastropods

Embletonia is a genus of nudibranchs, shell-less marine gastropod molluscs or sea slugs. It is the only genus in the monotypic family Embletoniidae, itself the only member of the superfamily Embletonioidea.

== Taxonomy ==
The genus Embletonia and its parent family and superfamily were named after the British naturalist Dennis Embleton (1810-1900). Two genera are recognised:

- Embletonia gracilis Risbec, 1928
- Embletonia pulchra (Alder & Hancock, 1844)

== Distribution and habitat ==
Species of the genus have a cosmopolitan distribution.
