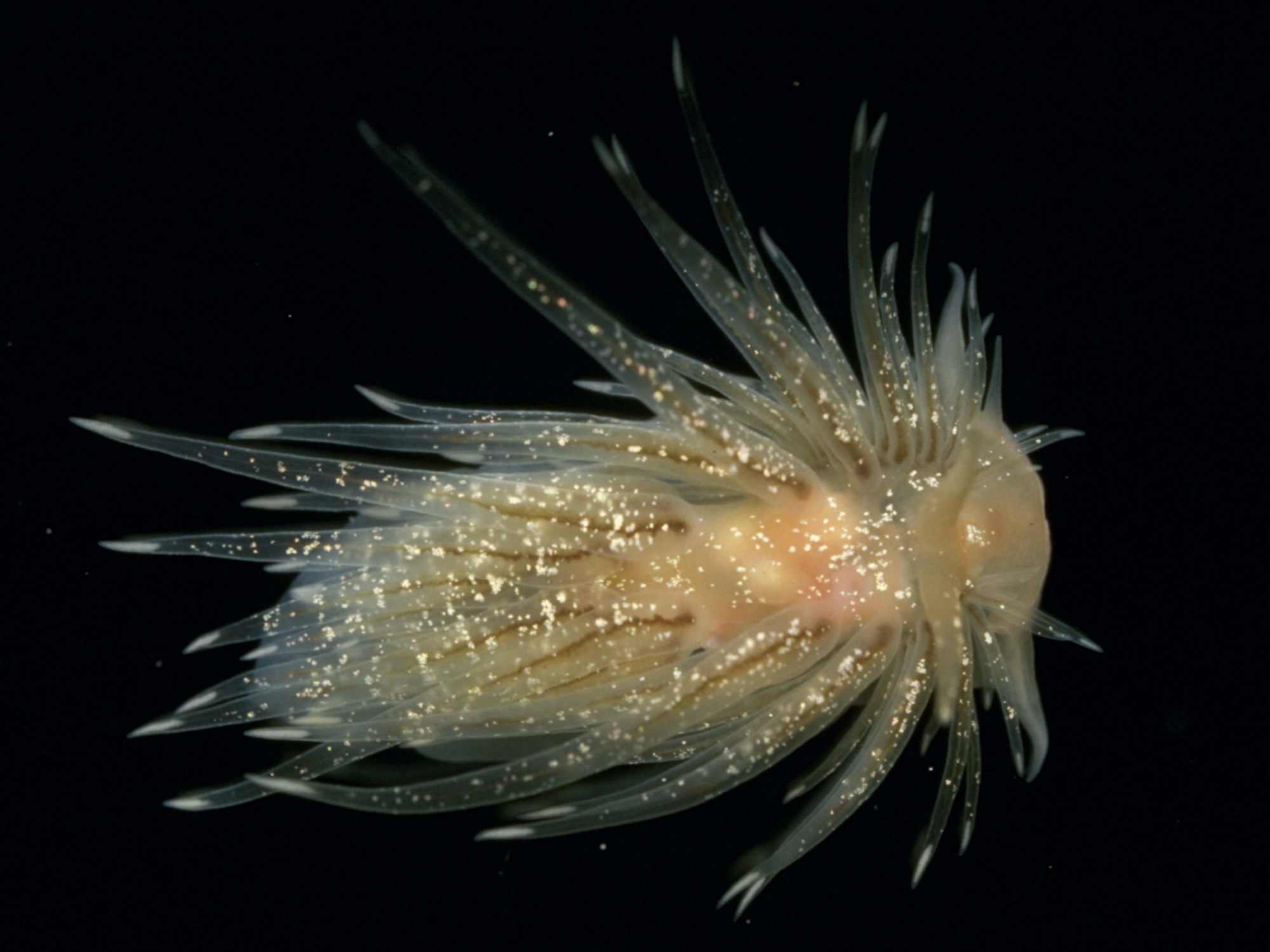
- The nudibranch Cumanotus beaumonti, Rathlin Island, Northern Ireland.

Scientific classification
- Kingdom: Animalia
- Phylum: Mollusca
- Class: Gastropoda
- Order: Nudibranchia
- Suborder: Aeolidacea
- Family: Cumanotidae
- Genus: Cumanotus
- Species: C. beaumonti

Binomial name
- Cumanotus beaumonti (Eliot, 1906)

Synonyms
- Coryphella beaumonti Eliot, 1906; Cumanotus laticeps Odhner, 1907

= Cumanotus beaumonti =

Species of gastropod

Cumanotus beaumonti, Beaumont's Nudibranch, is a species of sea slug, an aeolid nudibranch, a marine gastropod mollusc in the family Cumanotidae.

== Distribution ==
This species was described from Jennycliff Bay, Plymouth Sound, Devon, England, 50.34931°N 4.12678°W. It has been reported from the Irish Sea (including the Douglas, Isle of Man Marine Nature Reserve) Scotland and Norway.
