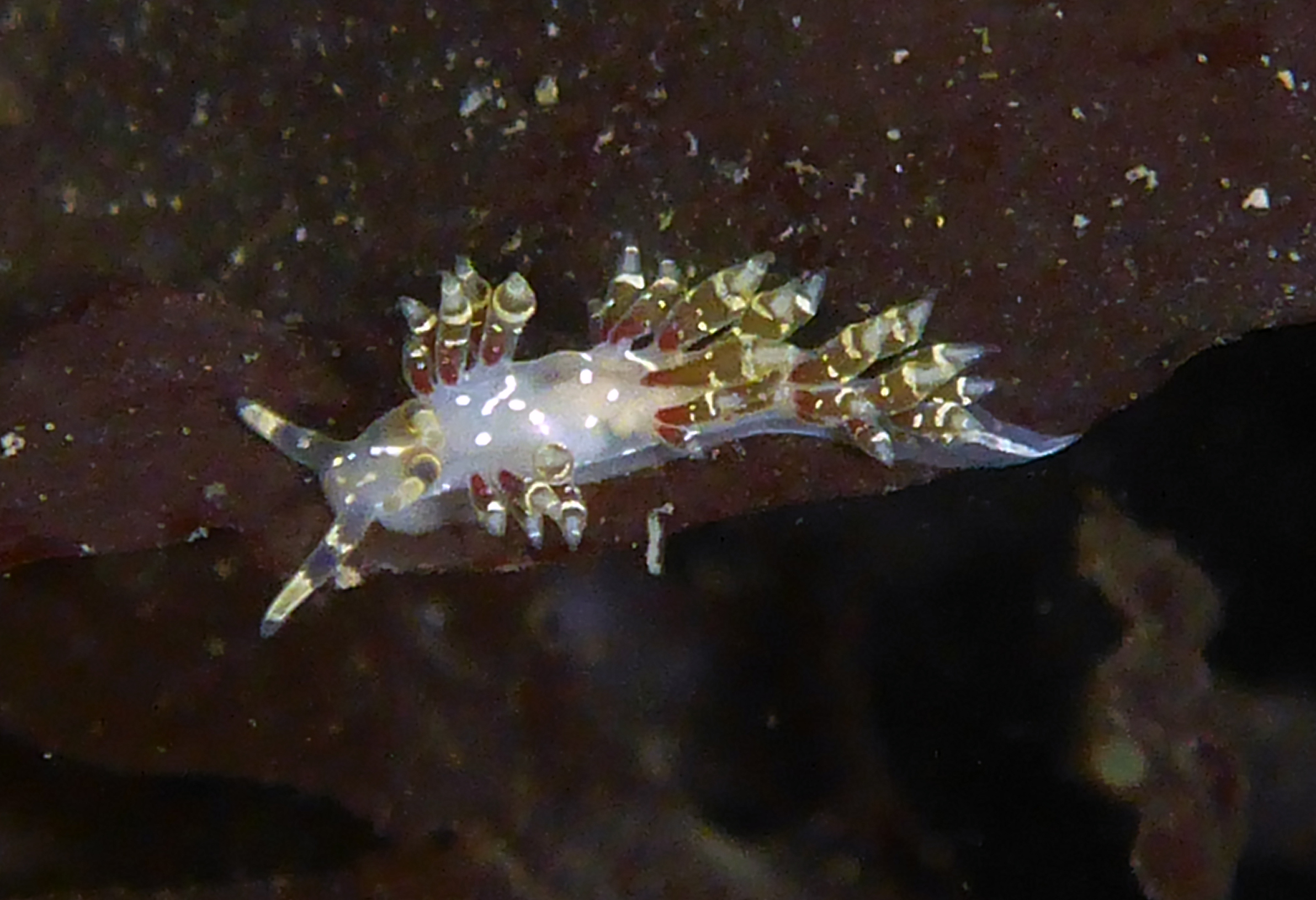
- Abronica abronia

Scientific classification
- Kingdom: Animalia
- Phylum: Mollusca
- Class: Gastropoda
- Order: Nudibranchia
- Suborder: Aeolidacea
- Superfamily: Fionoidea
- Family: Abronicidae; Korshunova, Martynov, Bakken, Evertsen, Fletcher, Mudianta, Saito, Lundin, Schrödl & Picton, 2017
- Genus: Abronica; Cella, Carmona, Ekimova, Chichvarkhin, Schepetov & Gosliner, 2016

Type species
- Cratena abronia MacFarland, 1966

Species
- See text

= Abronica =

Genus of gastropods

Abronica is a genus of nudibranchs, shell-less marine gastropod molluscs or sea slugs, and the only member of the family Abronicidae, which was first named in 2017.

== Species ==
Species within the genus Abronica include:

- Abronica abronia (MacFarland, 1966) - graceful aeolid
- Abronica payaso A. Y. Kim & Gosliner, 2024
- Abronica purpureoanulata (Baba, 1961)
- Abronica turon A. Y. Kim & Gosliner, 2024
