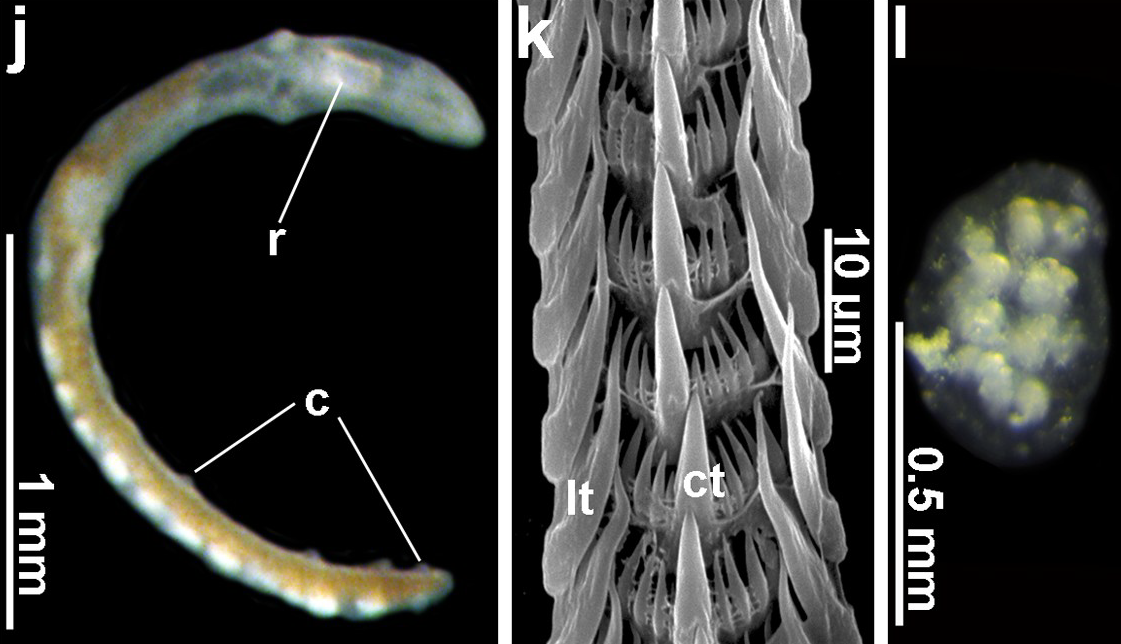
- Habitus of Pseudovermis paradoxus (j), its lateral teeth (k), and egg mass (l)

Scientific classification
- Kingdom: Animalia
- Phylum: Mollusca
- Class: Gastropoda
- Order: Nudibranchia
- Suborder: Aeolidacea
- Superfamily: Cumanotoidea
- Family: Pseudovermidae; Thiele, 1931

Type genus
- Pseudovermis Periaslavzeff, 1891

Genera
- See Genera

= Pseudovermidae =

Family of gastropods

Pseudovermidae is a taxonomic family of minute nudibranchs, marine gastropod molluscs or micromolluscs, within the superfamily Cumanotoidea. These extremely small sea slugs are meiofauna, living among sand grains.

== Genera ==
According to Korshunova and colleagues (2025), the following genera are recognised in the family Pseudovermidae:

- Pseudovermis Periaslavzeff, 1891
