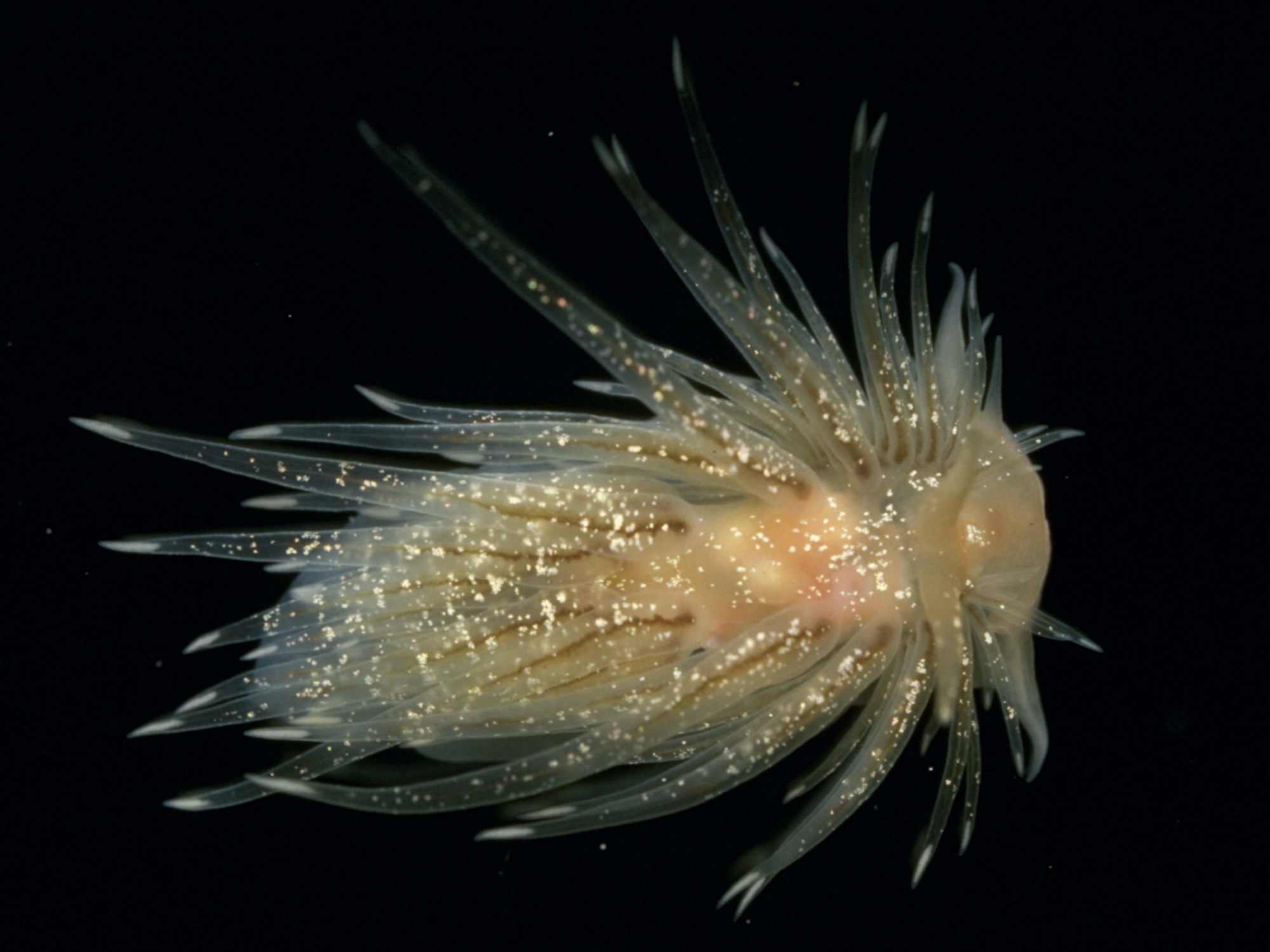
- Cumanotus beaumonti, Rathlin Island, Northern Ireland.

Scientific classification
- Kingdom: Animalia
- Phylum: Mollusca
- Class: Gastropoda
- Order: Nudibranchia
- Suborder: Aeolidacea
- Superfamily: Fionoidea
- Family: Cumanotidae; Odhner, 1907
- Genus: Cumanotus; Odhner, 1907

= Cumanotus =

Genus of gastropods

Cumanotus is a genus of nudibranchs, marine gastropod mollusks. It is the only genus in the family Cumanotidae.

== Species ==
There are three species within the genus Cumanotus:

- Cumanotus beaumonti (Eliot, 1906)
- Cumanotus cuenoti Pruvot-Fol, 1948
- Cumanotus fernaldi Thompson & Brown, 1984

Species brought into synonymy:

- Cumanotus laticeps Odhner, 1907: synonym of Cumanotus beaumonti (Eliot, 1906)
