= Seto Marine Biological Laboratory =

- 瀬戸臨海実験所
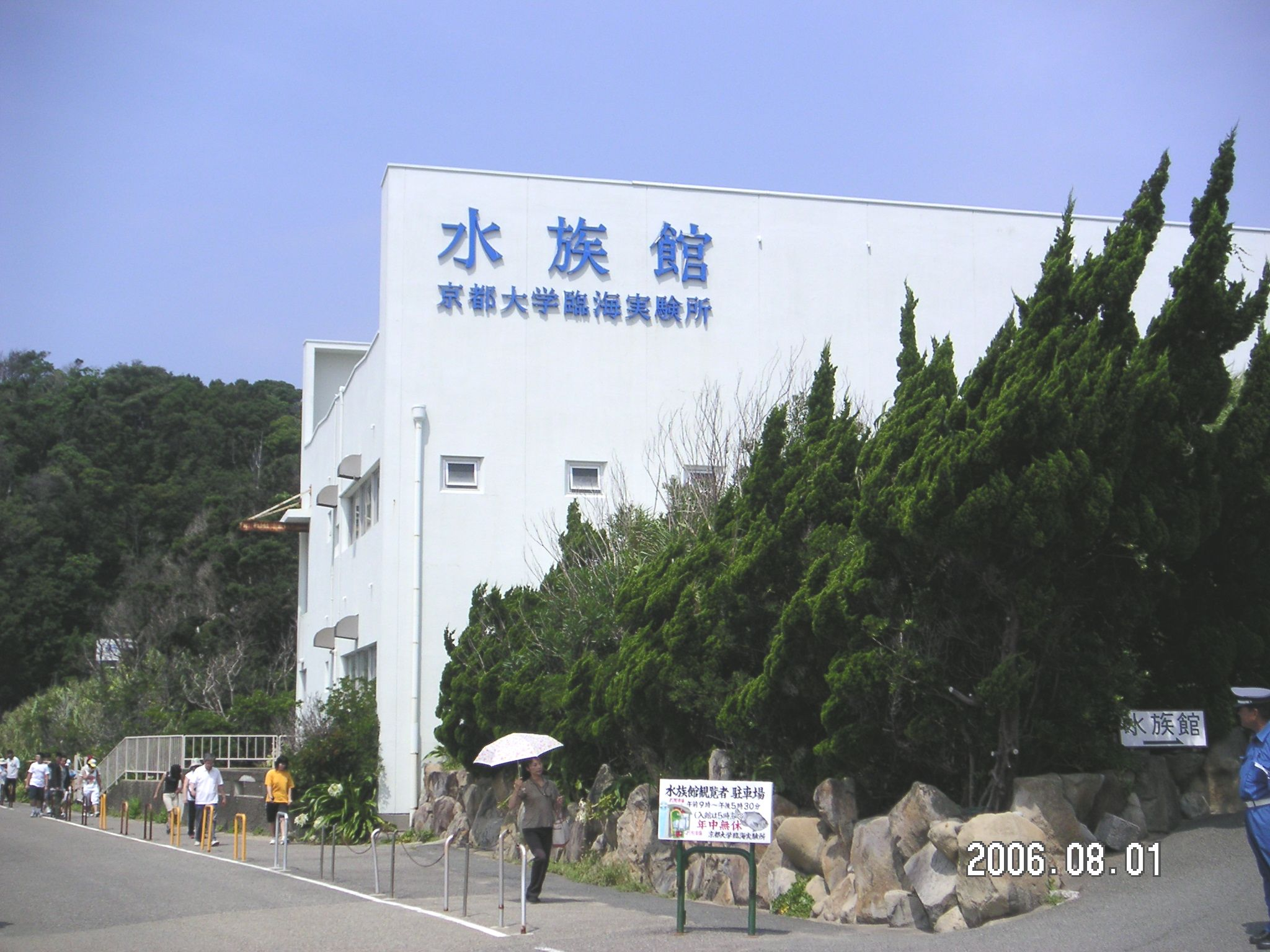
- Established: 1922; 104 years ago
- Field of research: Marine biology
- Location: Shirahama, Wakayama Prefecture, Japan; 33°41′34.5″N 135°20′18.0″E
- Affiliations: Kyoto University
- Website: Seto Marine Biological Laboratory
- Location within Japan

The Seto Marine Biological Laboratory (瀬戸臨海実験所, also known as SMBL), is a marine biology field station of Kyoto University. It is located in the small town of Shirahama in Wakayama Prefecture about 230 km from Kyoto.

the aquarium is accredited as a Museum-equivalent facilities by the Museum Act from Ministry of Education, Culture, Sports, Science and Technology.

== History ==
Established in 1922, research at the lab has historically been focused on marine invertebrates. A small island, Hatakejima, belongs to the laboratory and serves as an experimental field site in southeastern Tanabe Bay. The Shirahama Aquarium, open to the public, is located next to the research laboratories and operated by SMBL. In 2003, Kyoto University combined SMBL with the Maizuru Fisheries Research Station, University Forests, and the Subtropical Plant Institute into an administrative unit named the Field Science Education and Research Center (FSERC). The scientific journal Publications of the Seto Marine Biological Laboratory has been published by SMBL since 1949. The building reopened in July 2014 after renovation work including earthquake resistance.
