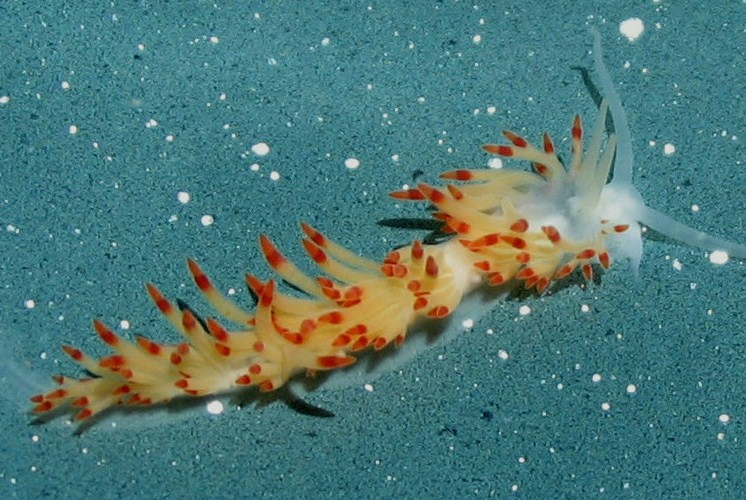
- Pacifia goddardi

Scientific classification
- Kingdom: Animalia
- Phylum: Mollusca
- Class: Gastropoda
- Order: Nudibranchia
- Suborder: Aeolidacea
- Family: Piseinotecidae
- Genus: Pacifia; Korshunova, Martynov, Bakken, Evertsen, Fletcher, Mudianta, Saito, Lundin, Schrödl & Picton, 2017

= Pacifia =

Genus of sea slugs

Pacifia is a genus of gastropods belonging to the family Piseinotecidae.

The species of this genus are found in Northern America.

== Species ==
Species included within the genus Pacifia include:

- Pacifia amica Korshunova, Martynov, Bakken, Evertsen, Fletcher, Mudianta, Saito, Lundin, Schrödl & Picton, 2017
- Pacifia goddardi (Gosliner, 2010)
