= Chudo =

Scientific classification
- Kingdom: Animalia
- Phylum: Mollusca
- Class: Gastropoda
- Order: Nudibranchia
- Suborder: Aeolidacea
- Superfamily: Chudoidea; Korshunova, Fletcher & Martynov, 2025
- Family: Chudidae; Korshunova, Fletcher & Martynov, 2025
- Genus: Chudo; Korshunova, Fletcher & Martynov, 2025
- Species: C. humanistica

Binomial name
- Chudo humanistica Korshunova, Fletcher & Martynov, 2025

Monotypic genus of nudibranchs

Chudo is a genus of nudibranchs and the only member of the family Chudidae, itself the only member of the superfamily Chudoidea. It is a monotypic genus, represented by the single species Chudo humanistica. Known only from the subantarctic Southern Ocean, it is a deep-sea taxon, found at depths of 2,800 m (9,200 ft).
