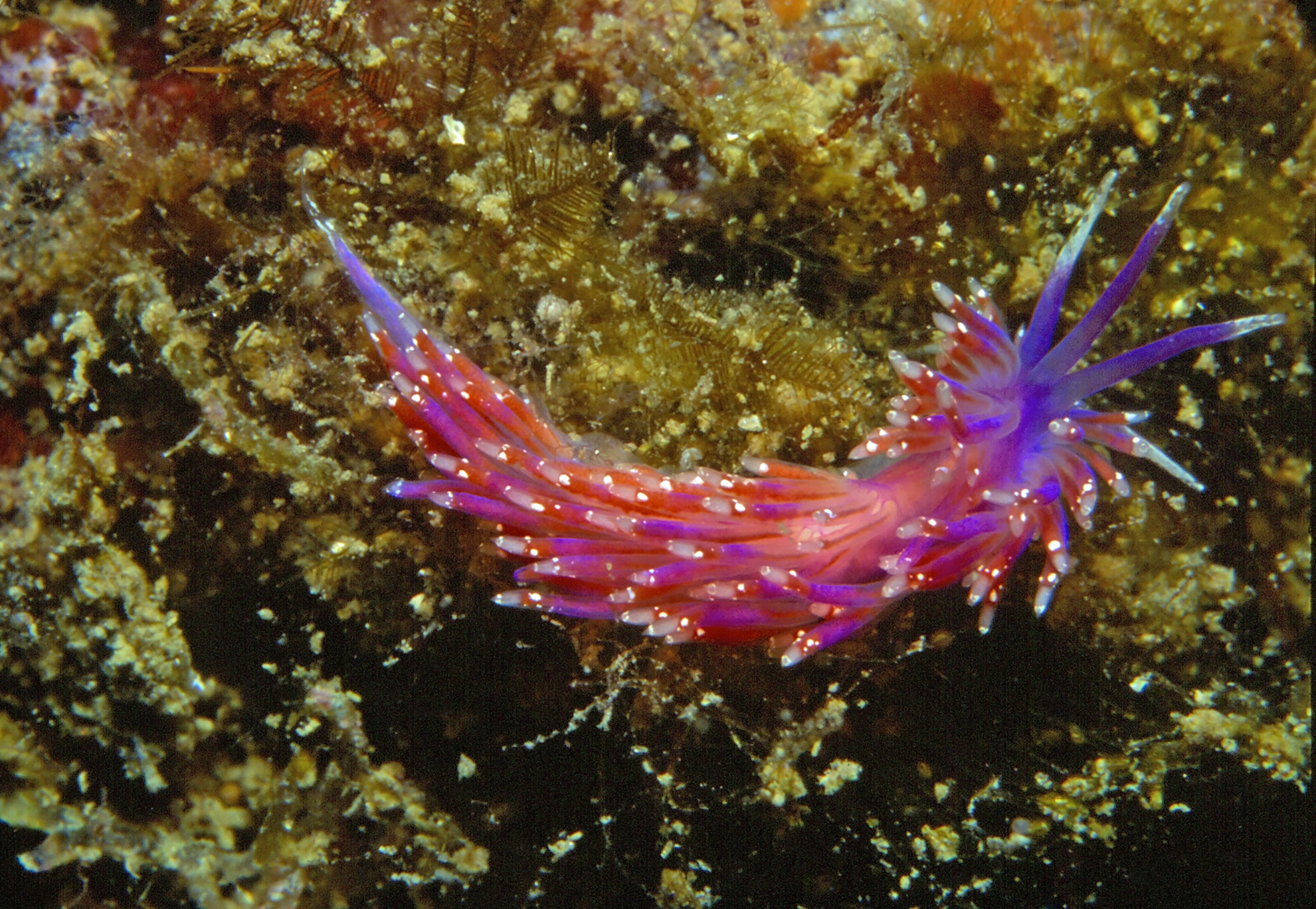
- Piseinotecus soussi

Scientific classification
- Kingdom: Animalia
- Phylum: Mollusca
- Class: Gastropoda
- Order: Nudibranchia
- Suborder: Aeolidacea
- Family: Piseinotecidae; Edmunds, 1970

Genera
- See text

= Piseinotecidae =

Family of gastropods

Piseinotecidae is a taxonomic family of sea slugs, specifically aeolid nudibranchs, marine gastropod molluscs.

== Classification Status ==
According to Korshunova et al. (2025), Piseinotecidae is superfamilia incertae sedis under suborder Aeolidacea, containing only the genus Piseinotecus. The species Piseinotecus soussi, was transferred to the genus Phetia under family Unidentiidae, as P. soussi was the only member of Piseinotecus that had strong evidence for clustering with Unidentiid genera, and necessitated the establishment of its own genus. Additionally, the study has determined that the study that established P. soussi included a fully incorrect analysis of its reproductive system, which is what led to its erroneous placement in Piseinotecus in the first place. As for the placements of the other Piseinotecus members, species far rarer than P. soussi, they remain uncertain due to lack of molecular data.

Recently, Ekimova et al. (2026) instead "tentatively" suggests Piseinotecidae to be a senior synonym of Unidentiidae, as previously established diagnostics for Piseinotecidae appeared to agree fully with Unidentiidae. The study acknowledges hasty synonymy without molecular data is often a poor idea due to possibly unknown convergences, but at the same time considers maintaining separate families due to lack of molecular data to be an impractical precedent to set. Additionally, the study agrees it seems likely that Piseinotecus soussi does require its own genus separate from Piseinotecus, but chooses not to recognise Phetia as valid without more data from other Piseinotecus species.

Additionally, while Piseinotecidae (and thus, the synonimzed Unidentiidae) was placed under Fionoidea in Ekimova et al. 2026, all analysis was done at only a familial level and narrower, without any discussion of superfamilies.

== Genera ==
According to Korshunova et al., genera within the family Piseinotecidae include:

- Piseinotecus Er. Marcus, 1955

According to Ekimova et al., genera within the family Piseinotecidae include :

- Pacifia Korshunova, Martynov, Bakken, Evertsen, Fletcher, Mudianta, H. Saito, Lundin, Schrödl & Picton, 2017
- Piseinotecus Er. Marcus, 1955
- Unidentia Millen & Hermosillo, 2012
