= Diverticulum (mollusc anatomy) =

Mollusk digestive anatomical feature

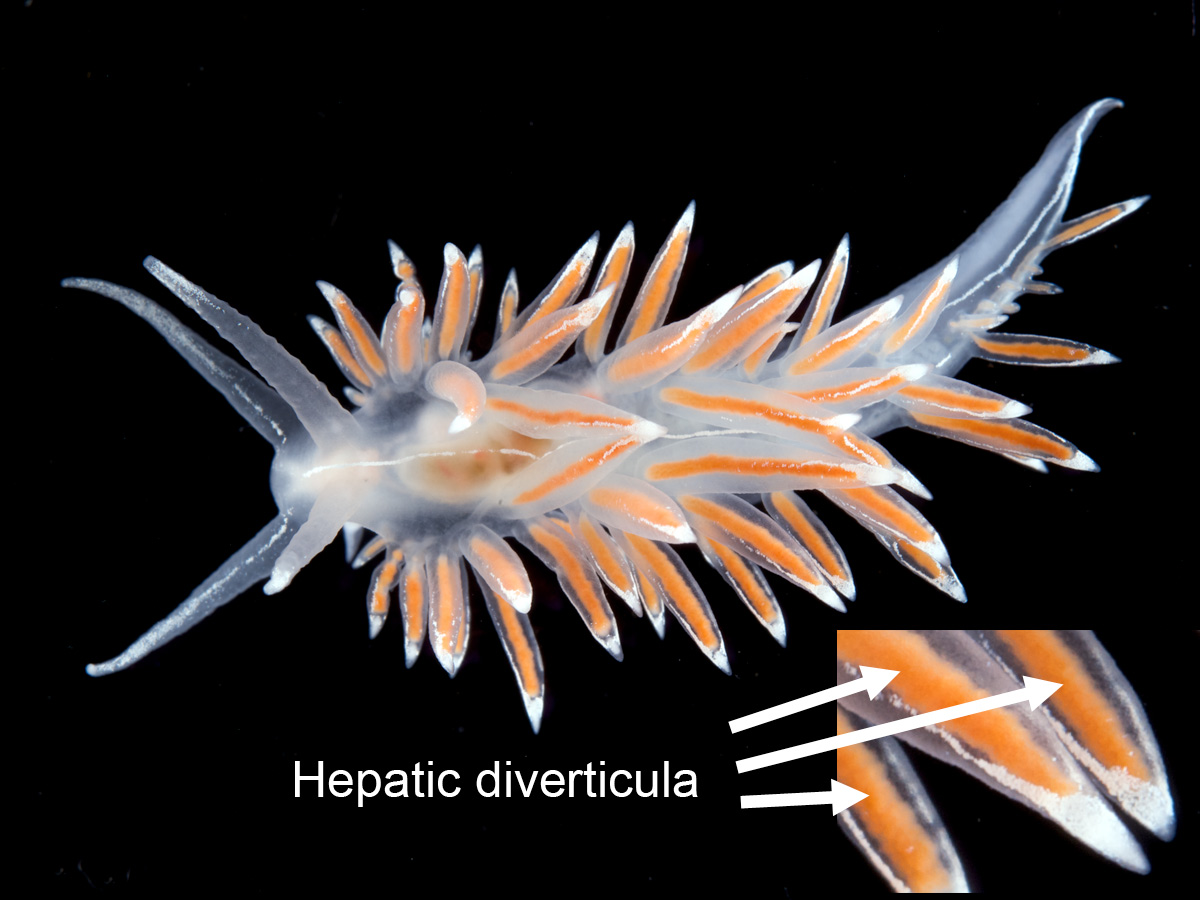
The aeolid nudibranch Flabellina lineata with enlargement of the cerata to show the coloured hepatic diverticula.

As applied to mollusks, the Neo-Latin term diverticulum is an anatomical feature. The term is most often encountered in the plural form as "diverticula", "hepatic diverticula", or "digestive diverticula", which are anatomical terms for organs which are visible from the outside of the body in a clade of sea slugs known as aeolid nudibranchs, marine opisthobranch gastropod molluscs.

The term is also applied to mollusk anatomy in other contexts: land slugs such as Lehmannia marginata have a caecal diverticulum and there is also a diverticulum in the stomach of certain Bivalvia.

== Description and functions ==
=== In the Aeolidida ===
Individual animals within the nudibranch clade Aeolidida have an array of long protruding structures called cerata on their dorsal surface. Located within the cerata of these nudibranchs are hepatic diverticula, which are an outgrowth of the digestive gland or hepatopancreas of the animal. The cerata are translucent, and thus the contents of the diverticula are easily visible from the outside of the animal. Because of this, an aeolid nudibranch automatically takes on the colour of whatever substrate and food source it is living on and feeding on (for example, sea anemones or hydroids). Visually the animal is camouflaged when it is on its food source. The diverticula also serve another important purpose because they pass along to the tips of the cerata any intact nematocysts that have been ingested from the food source. These stinging cells then serve to defend the nudibranch against predation.
