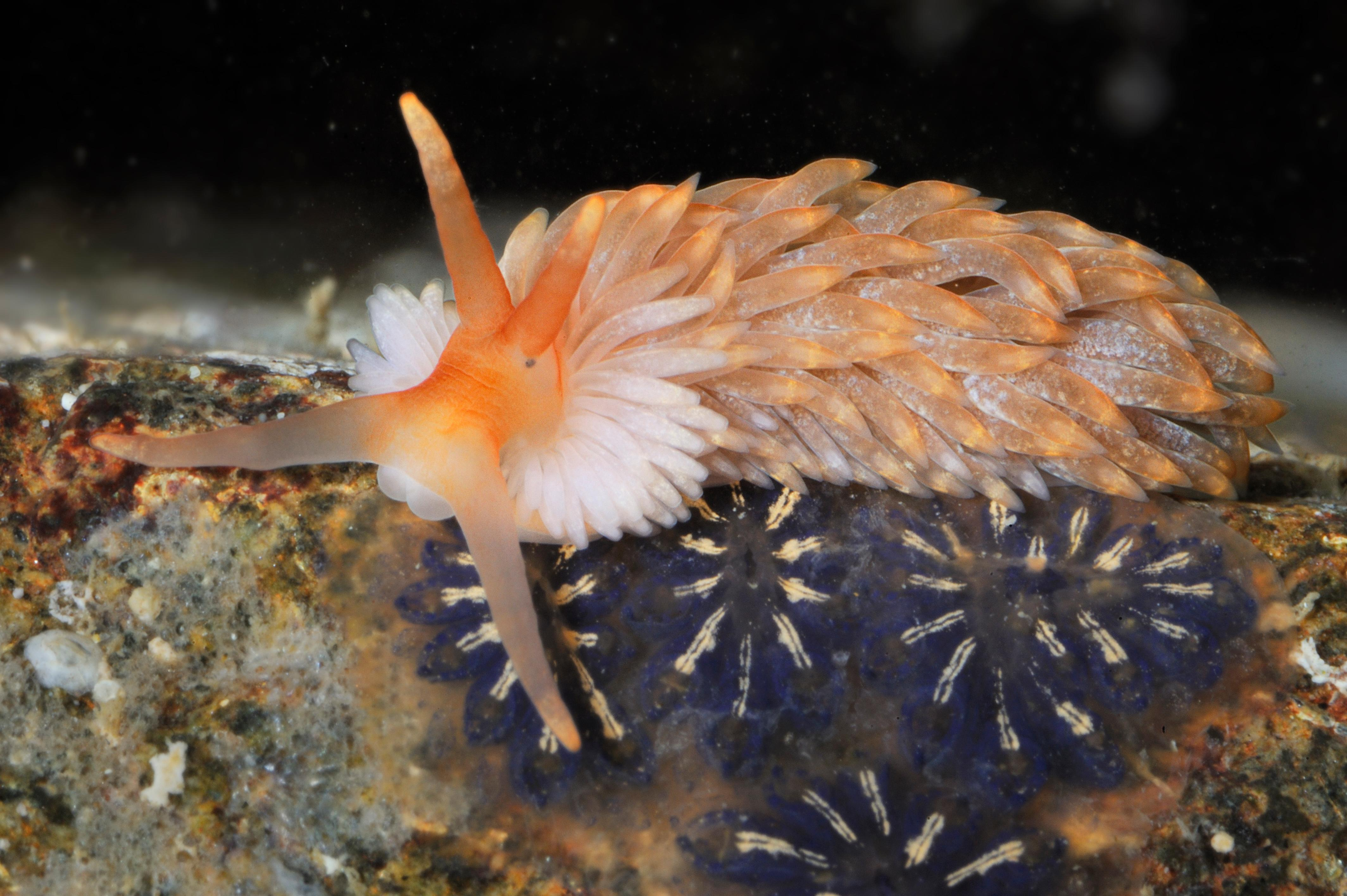
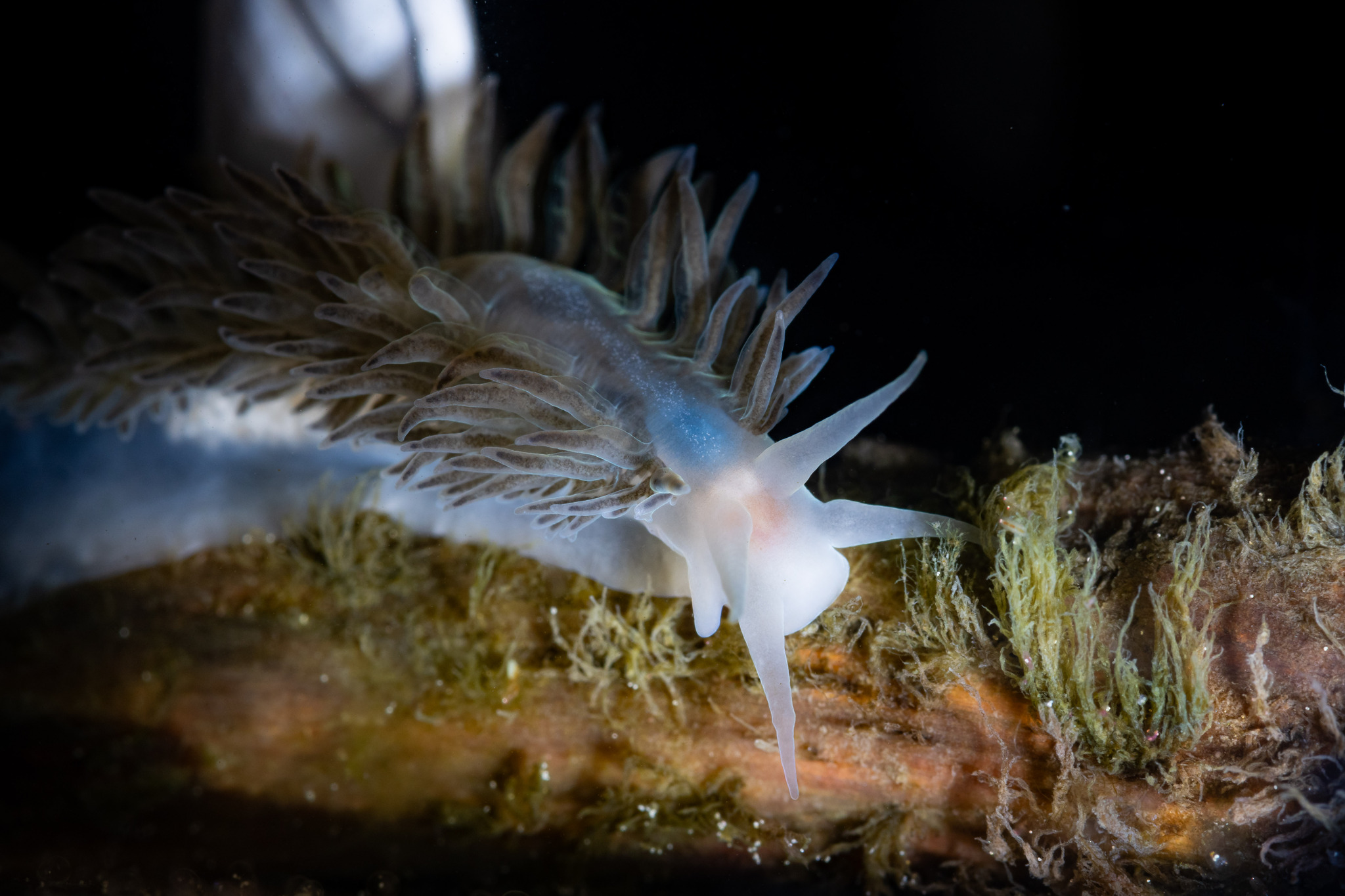
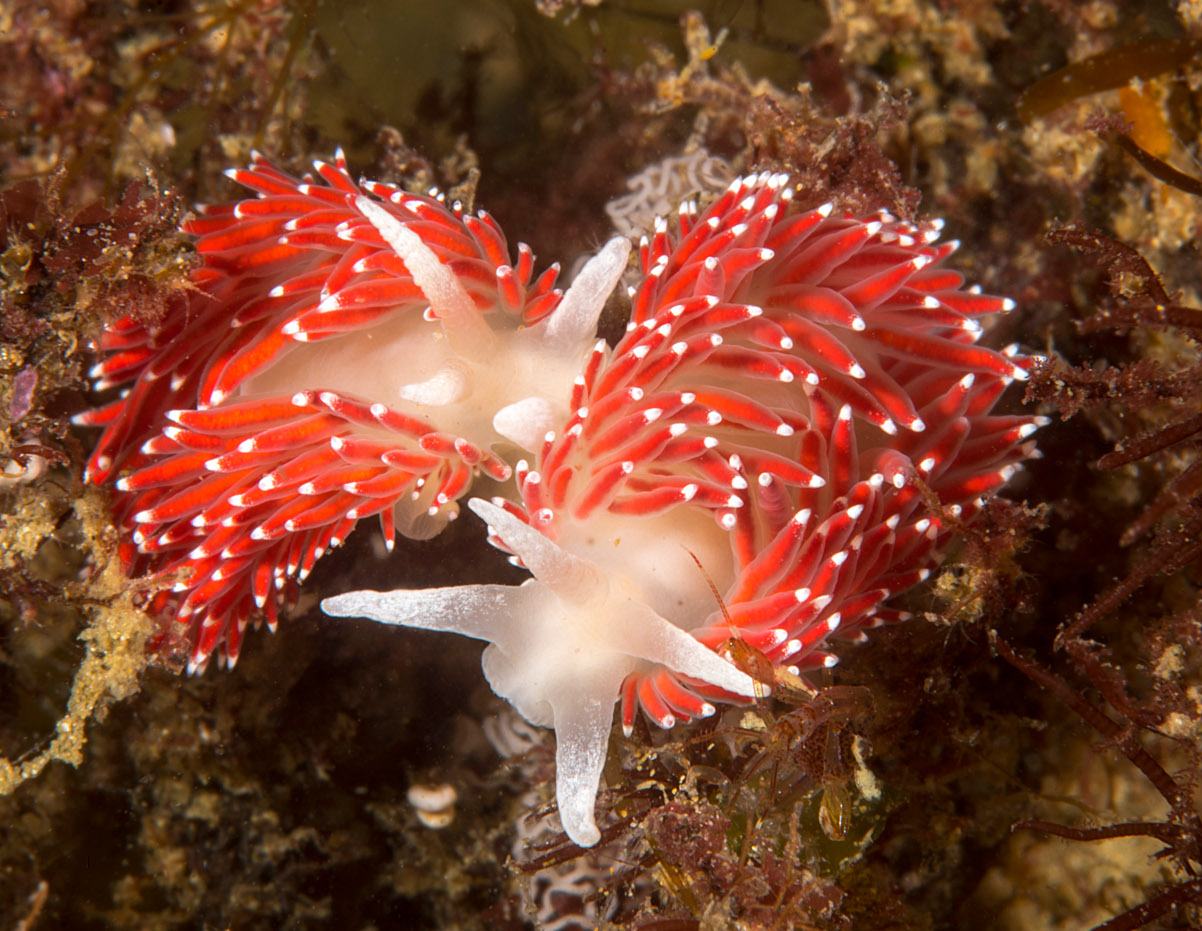
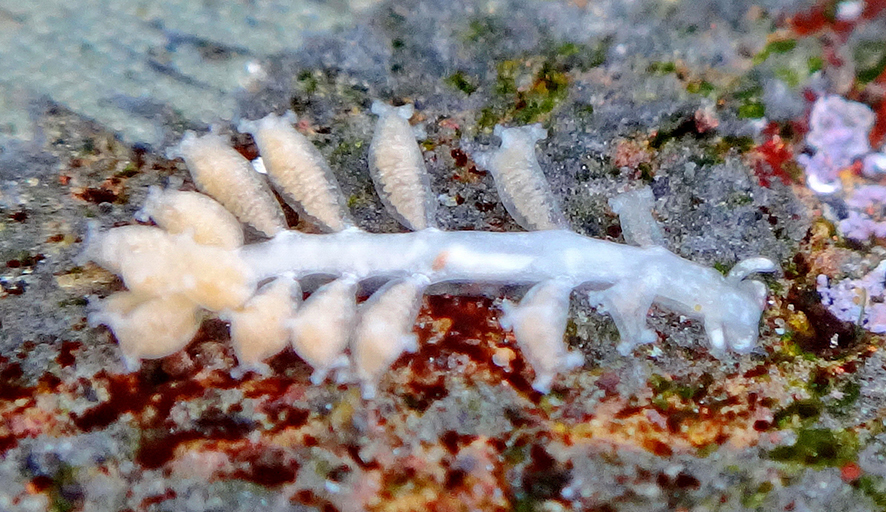
- From left to right in each row, from top to bottom: Aeolidiella alderi (Aeolidioidea), Fiona pinnata (Fionoidea), Coryphella nobilis (Flabellinoidea), Embletonia gracilis (Embletonioidea)

Scientific classification
- Kingdom: Animalia
- Phylum: Mollusca
- Class: Gastropoda
- Order: Nudibranchia
- Suborder: Aeolidacea; Odhner, 1934

Superfamilies
- Aeolidioidea; Apataoidea; Cumanotoidea; Chudoidea; Embletonioidea; Fionoidea; Flabellinoidea; Flabellinopsoidea; Notaeolidioidea; Samloidea; Unidentioidea

= Aeolidacea =

Suborder of gastropods

Aeolidacea is a suborder of nudibranchs, shell-less marine gastropod molluscs or sea slugs.

== Taxonomy ==
The following superfamilies and families are recognised in the suborder Aeolidacea, following the 2025 revision of the taxonomy of Aeolidacea by Korshunova and colleagues based on the results of molecular phylogenetic analyses. Families interpreted as synonyms under the scheme presented by Ekimova et al. (2026) are identified:

- Superfamily Aeolidioidea Gray, 1827
  - Family Aeolidiidae Gray, 1827
  - Family Babakinidae Roller, 1973
  - Family Facelinidae Bergh, 1899
  - Family Favorinidae Bergh, 1899
  - Family Glaucidae Gray, 1827
  - Family Myrrhinidae Bergh, 1905
  - Family Pleurolidiidae Burn, 1966
- Superfamily Apataoidea Korshunova et al., 2017
  - Family Apataidae Korshunova et al., 2017
- Superfamily Cumanotoidea Odhner, 1907
  - Family Cumanotidae Odhner, 1907
  - Family Pseudovermidae Thiele, 1931
- Superfamily Chudoidea Korshunova, Fletcher & Martynov, 2025
  - Family Chudidae Korshunova, Fletcher & Martynov, 2025
- Superfamily Embletonioidea Pruvot-Fol, 1954
  - Family Embletoniidae Pruvot-Fol, 1954
- Superfamily Fionoidea Gray, 1857
  - Family Abronicidae Korshunova et al., 2017
  - Family Calmidae Iredale and O’Donoghue, 1923
  - Family Cuthonellidae Miller, 1971
  - Family Cuthonidae Odhner, 1934
  - Family Eubranchidae Odhner, 1934
  - Family Fionidae Gray, 1857
  - Family Murmaniidae Korshunova et al., 2017
  - Family Tergipedidae Bergh, 1889
  - Family Trinchesiidae Nordsieck, 1972
  - Family Xenocratenidae Martynov et al., 2020
- Superfamily Flabellinoidea Bergh, 1889
  - Family ?Coryphellidae Bergh, 1889 (proposed junior synonym of Flabellinidae Bergh, 1889)
  - Family Flabellinidae Bergh, 1889
  - Family ?Paracoryphellidae Miller, 1971 (proposed junior synonym of Flabellinidae Bergh, 1889)
- Superfamily Flabellinopsoidea Korshunova et al., 2017
  - Family Flabellinopsidae Korshunova et al., 2017
  - Family Hantazuidae Korshunova, Fletcher & Martynov, 2025
- Superfamily Notaeolidioidea Eliot, 1910
  - Family Notaeolidiidae Eliot, 1910
- Superfamily Samloidea Korshunova et al., 2017
  - Family Samlidae Korshunova et al. 2017
- Superfamily Unidentioidea Millen and Hermosillo, 2012
  - Family ?Unidentiidae Millen and Hermosillo, 2012 (proposed junior synonym of Piseinotecidae Edmunds, 1970)
- Superfamily incertae sedis
  - Family Piseinotecidae Edmunds, 1970
