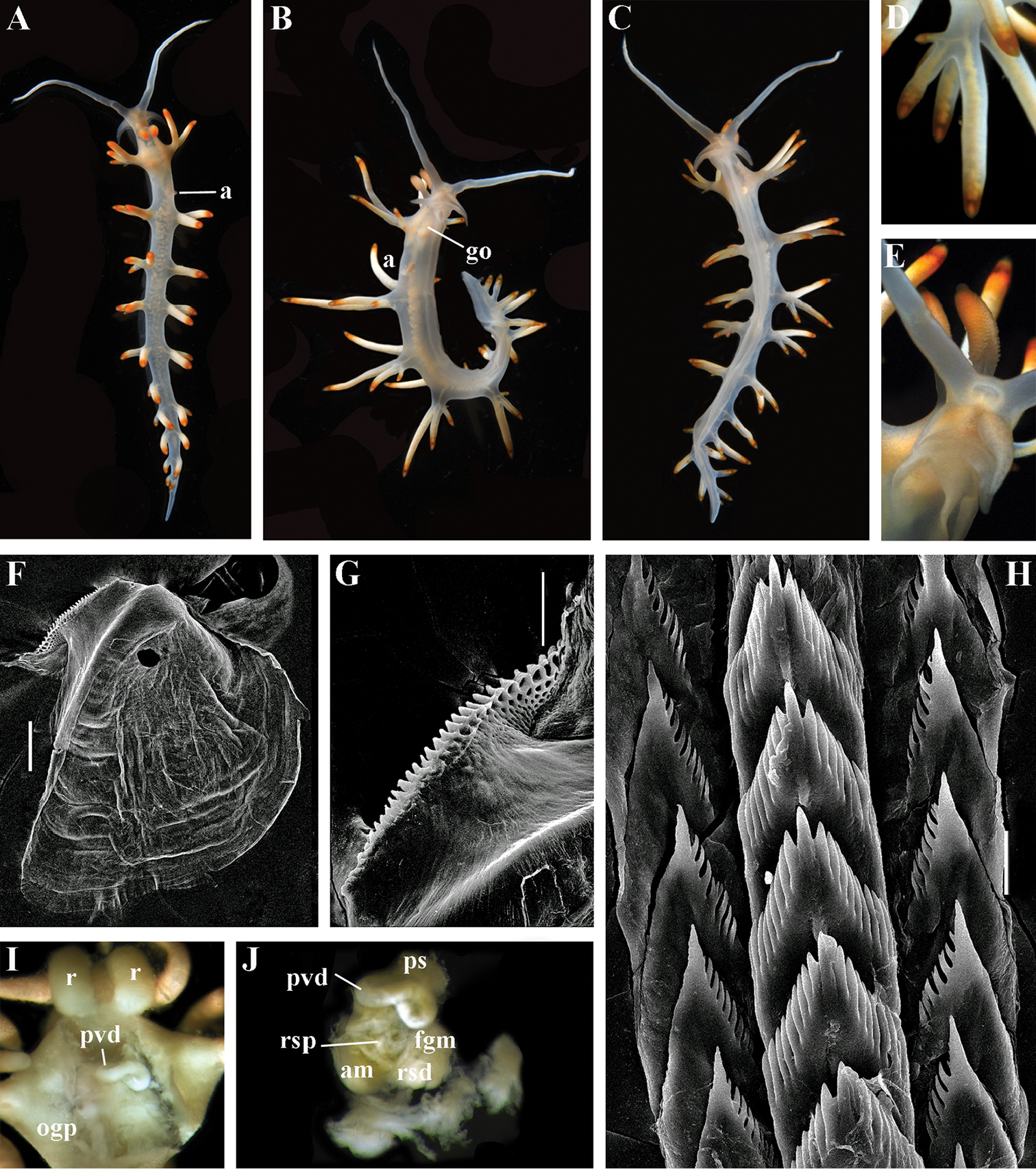

Scientific classification
- Kingdom: Animalia
- Phylum: Mollusca
- Class: Gastropoda
- Order: Nudibranchia
- Suborder: Aeolidacea
- Family: Samlidae
- Genus: Samla
- Species: S. takashigei

Binomial name
- Samla takashigei Korshunova, Martynov, Bakken, Evertsen, Fletcher, Mudianta, Saito, Lundin, Schrödl & Picton, 2017

= Samla takashigei =

Species of gastropod

Samla takashigei is a species of sea slug, an aeolid nudibranch, a marine heterobranch mollusc in the family Samlidae.

== Distribution ==
This species was described from Osezaki, Japan, 35.0305°N 138.7892°E. It was previously confused with Samla bicolor.
