= Samla macassarana =

Flabellina macassarana

Scientific classification
- Domain: Eukaryota
- Kingdom: Animalia
- Phylum: Mollusca
- Class: Gastropoda
- Order: Nudibranchia
- Suborder: Cladobranchia
- Superfamily: Fionoidea
- Family: Samlidae
- Genus: Samla
- Species: S. macassarana

Binomial name
- Samla macassarana Bergh, 1905

Species of gastropod

Samla macassarana is a species of sea slug, an aeolid nudibranch, a marine heterobranch mollusc in the family Samlidae.

== Description ==
S. macassarana can grow up to a maximum length of 30mm (3 cm) and is translucent with white pigment on the oral tentacles, orange tips to the white cerata and translucent head appendages.

== Distribution ==
This species is distributed in the Western Pacific Ocean and can be commonly found in the Philippines and Malaysia.
