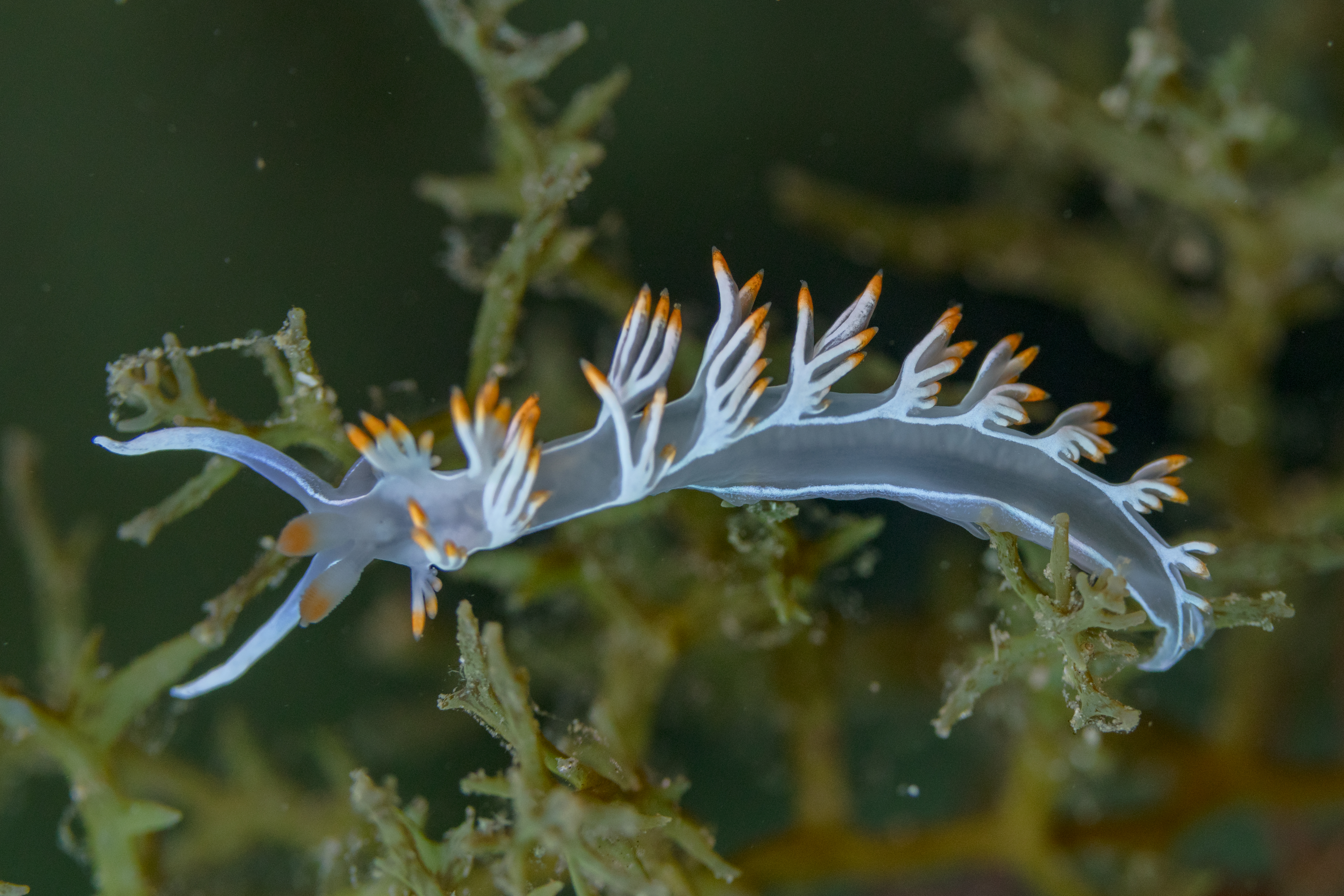
- Luisella babai

Scientific classification
- Kingdom: Animalia
- Phylum: Mollusca
- Class: Gastropoda
- Order: Nudibranchia
- Suborder: Aeolidacea
- Family: Samlidae
- Genus: Luisella
- Species: L. babai

Binomial name
- Luisella babai (Schmekel, 1972)

Synonyms
- Flabellina babai Schmekel, 1972

= Luisella babai =

Species of gastropod

Luisella babai is a species of sea slug, an aeolid nudibranch, a marine gastropod mollusc in the family Samlidae.

== Etymology ==
The specific epithet babai honors the Japanese malacologist Kikutaro Baba.

== Distribution ==
This species was described from the Mediterranean Sea where it is a fairly common species. It is also present in the Adriatic Sea and it has also been reported from the Atlantic coasts of Spain, Portugal and Senegal. It inhabits rocky bottoms at depths of 5 to 50 m.

== Description ==
Luisella babai can reach a length of about 30–53 millimetres (1.2–2.1 in). Body is usually white to light blue, elongated and translucent with a white edge and a long sharp pointed tail. Cerata are arranged in groups of 3–9. They show the same body color with yellow-orange rings on the terminal parts. The two long tentacles in their anterior part have the same color of the body. Also the two rhinophores in their upper part shows the same color of the body, with a yellow terminal part. Digestive system and liver are visible in transparency.

This species is rather similar to Samla bicolor (Kelaart, 1858), but S. bicolor can be found only in the Indo-Pacific.

== Biology ==
Hermaphrodite, like all nudibranchs, it deposits on the branches of the hydrozoans a white gelatinous spiral cord composed of thousands of eggs from which five to eight days later veliger larvae hatch. These nudibranchs feed on hydroids, manly Campanularia, Bougainvillia and Eudendrium species.

== Gallery ==
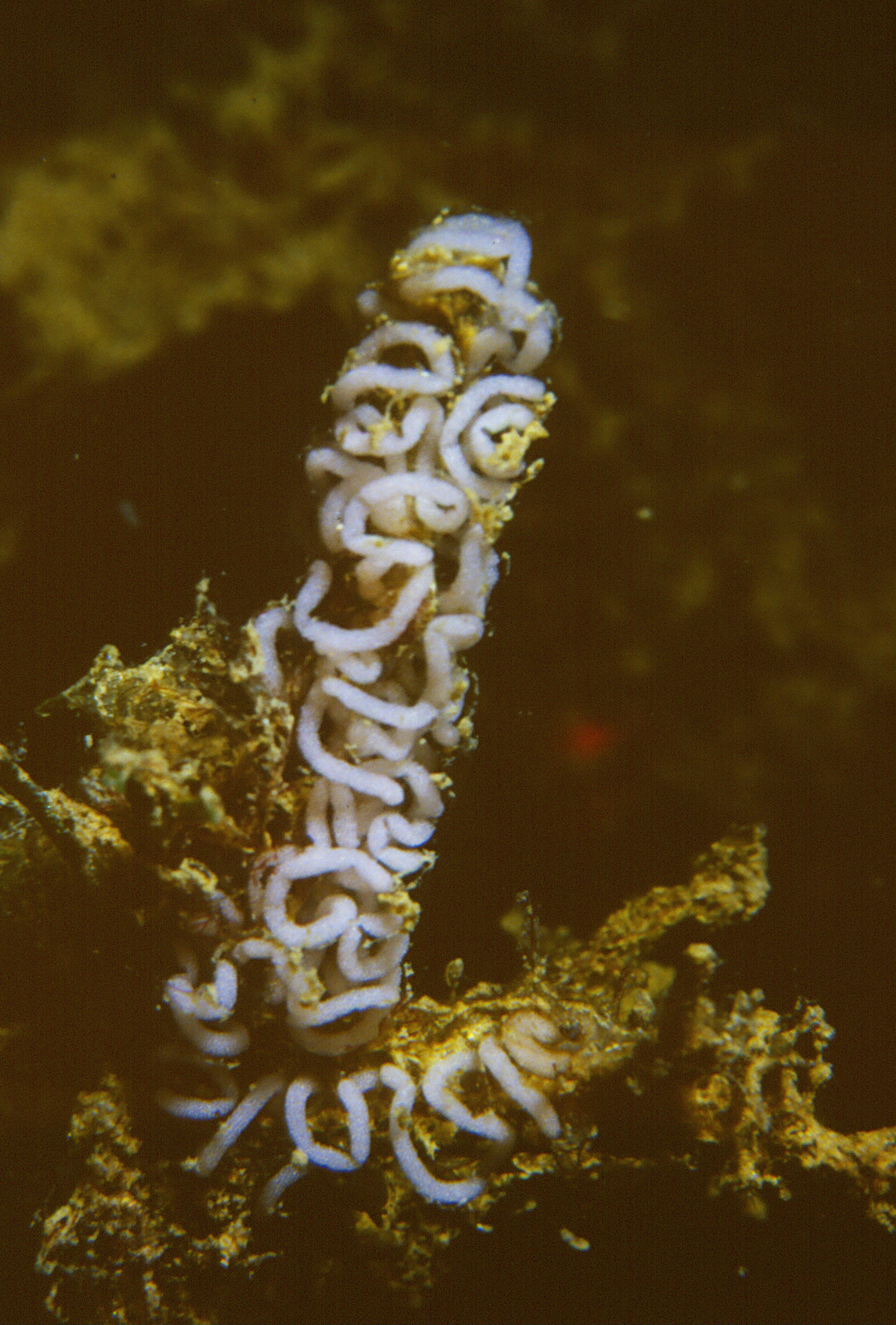
L. babai spawn

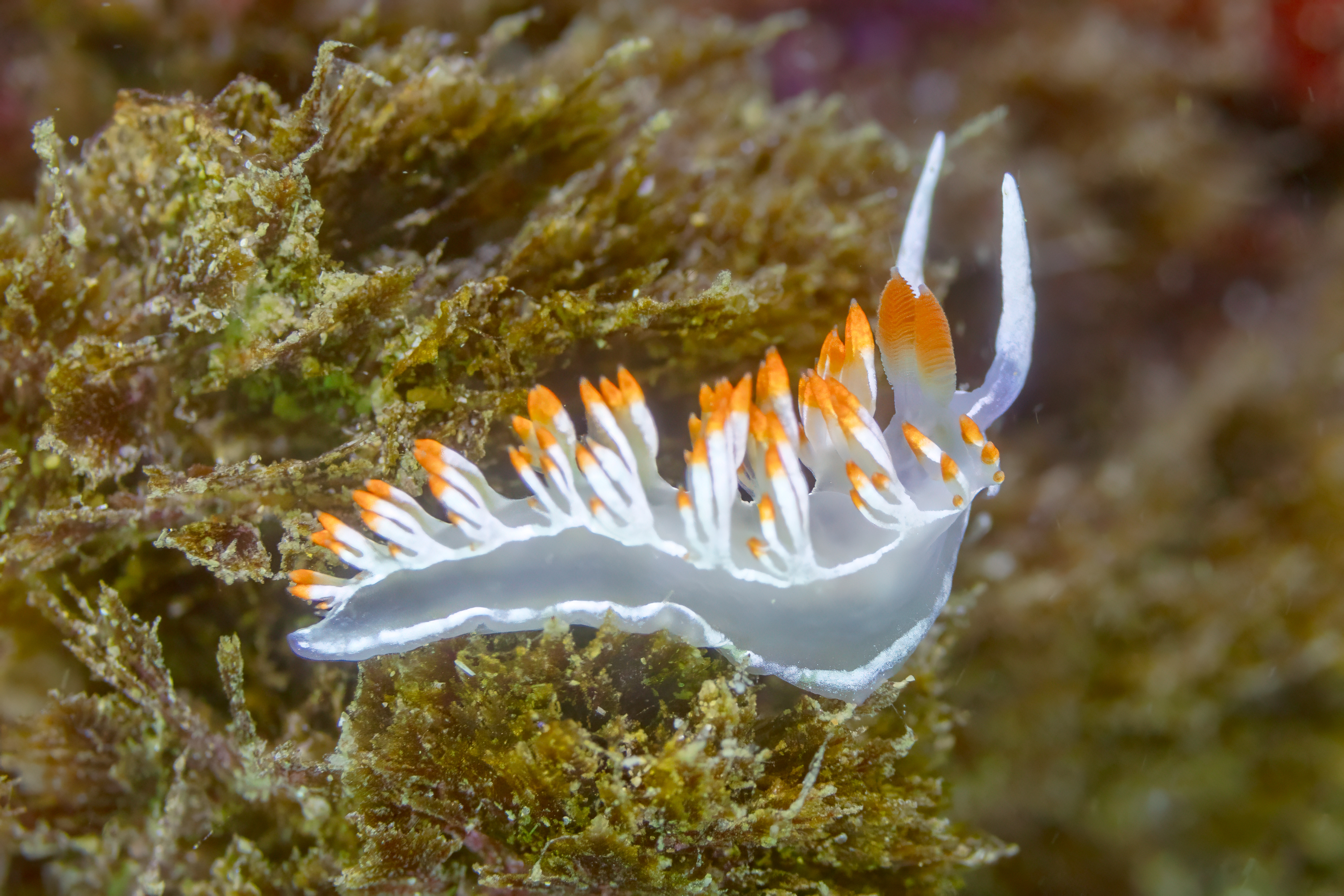
L. babai in the coast of Portugal

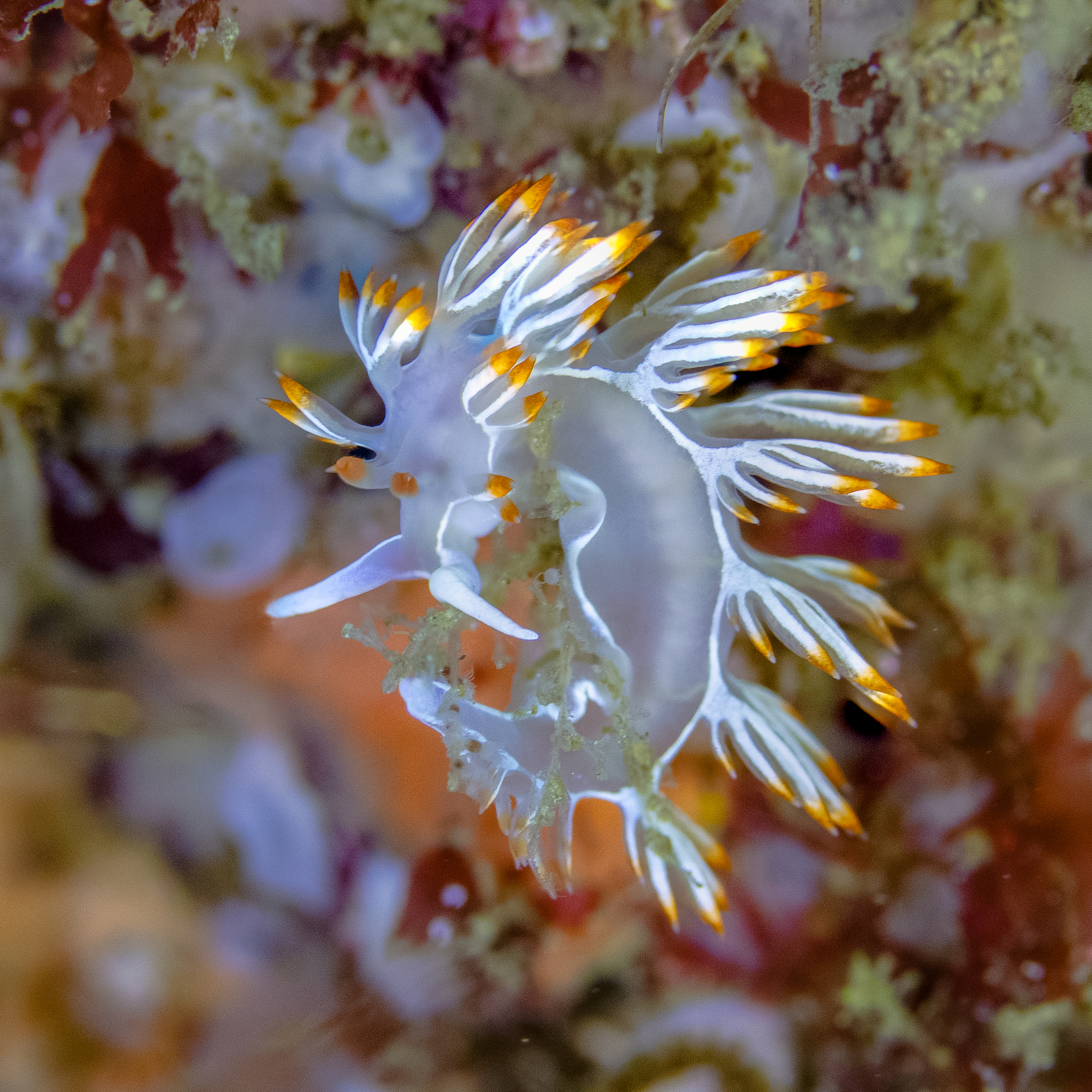

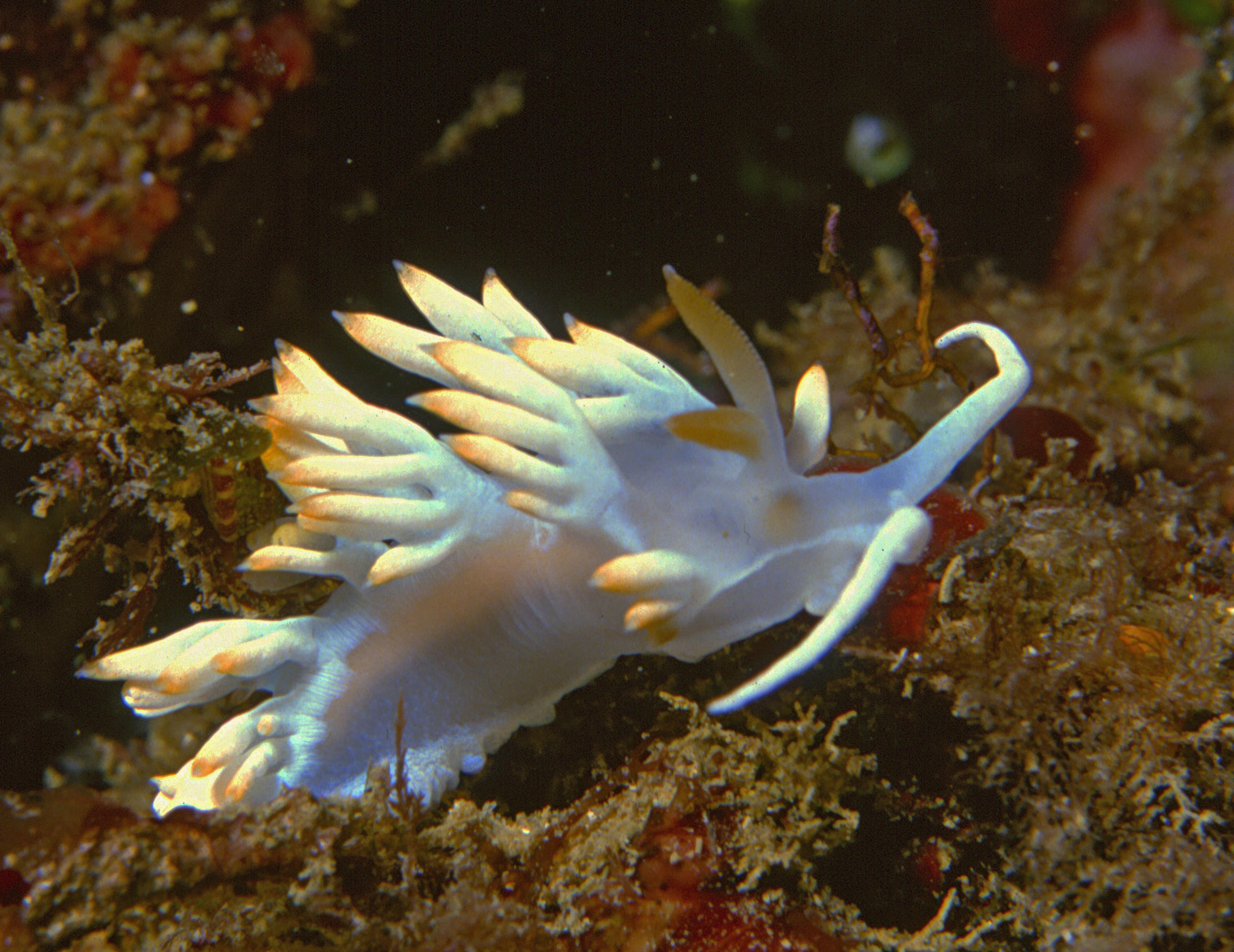
