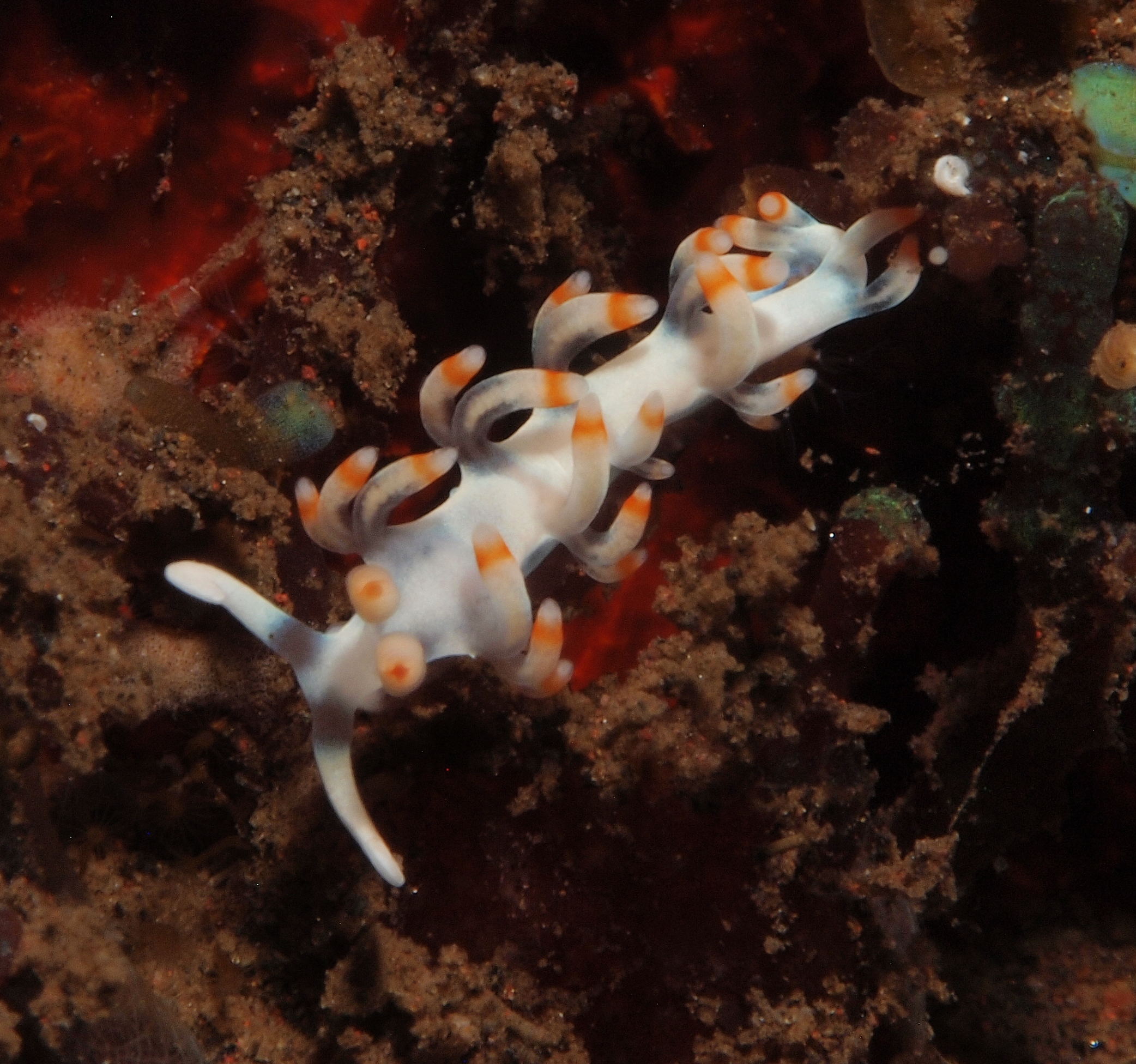
- Samla bicolor

Scientific classification
- Kingdom: Animalia
- Phylum: Mollusca
- Class: Gastropoda
- Order: Nudibranchia
- Suborder: Aeolidacea
- Family: Samlidae
- Genus: Samla; Bergh, 1900

Type species
- Samla bicolor (Kelaart, 1858)

= Samla (gastropod) =

Genus of gastropods

Samla is a genus of sea slugs, specifically aeolid nudibranchs, marine gastropod molluscs in the family Samlidae.

== Species ==
Species within the genus Samla are as follows:

- Samla bicolor (Kelaart, 1858)
- Samla bilas (Gosliner & Willan, 1991)
- Samla macassarana (Bergh, 1905)
- Samla riwo (Gosliner & Willan, 1991)
- Samla takashigei Korshunova, Martynov, Bakken, Evertsen, Fletcher, Mudianta, Saito, Lundin, Schrödl & Picton, 2017

Species brought into synonymy:

- Samla annuligera Bergh, 1900: synonym of Samla bicolor (Kelaart, 1858)
- Samla rubropurpurata (Gosliner & Willan, 1991): synonym of Launsina rubropurpurata (Gosliner & Willan, 1991)
- Samla telja (Ev. Marcus & Er. Marcus, 1967): synonym of Luisella telja (Ev. Marcus & Er. Marcus, 1967)
