= Luisella bulbosa =

Scientific classification
- Kingdom: Animalia
- Phylum: Mollusca
- Class: Gastropoda
- Order: Nudibranchia
- Suborder: Aeolidacea
- Family: Samlidae
- Genus: Luisella
- Species: L. bulbosa

Binomial name
- Luisella bulbosa (Ortea & Espinosa, 1998)

Synonyms
- Flabellina bulbosa Ortea & Espinosa, 1998

Species of gastropod

Luisella bulbosa is a species of sea slug, an aeolid nudibranch, a marine gastropod mollusc in the family Samlidae.

== Distribution ==
This species was described from the island of Sal, Cape Verde.
