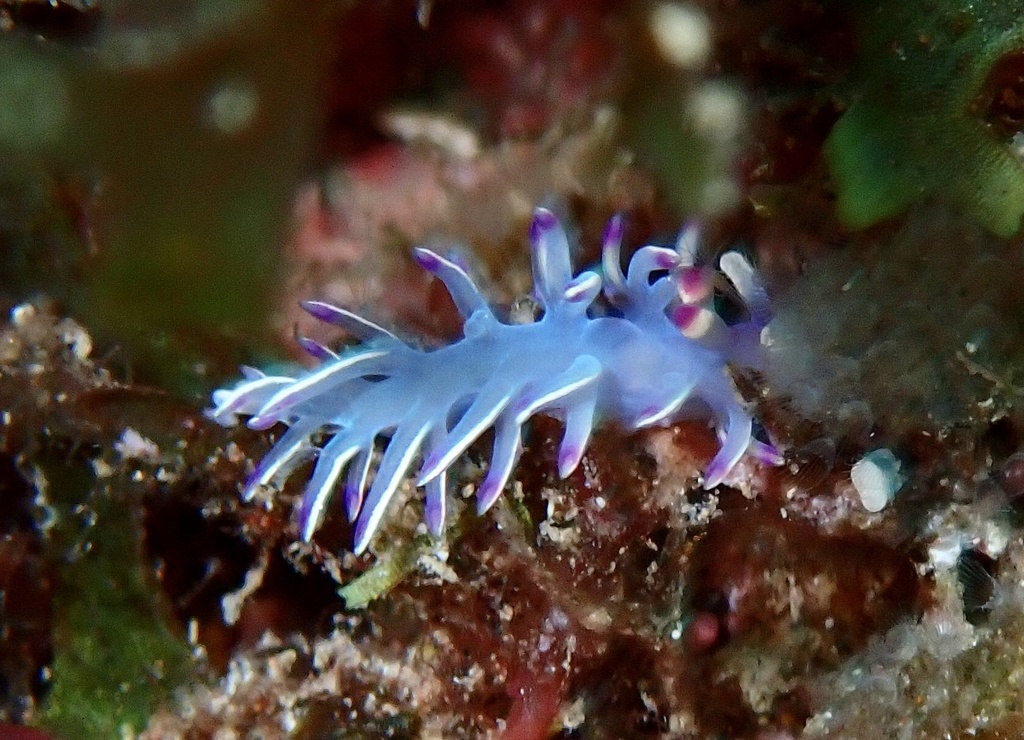

Scientific classification
- Kingdom: Animalia
- Phylum: Mollusca
- Class: Gastropoda
- Order: Nudibranchia
- Suborder: Aeolidacea
- Family: Samlidae
- Genus: Luisella
- Species: L. llerae

Binomial name
- Luisella llerae (Ortea, 1989)

Synonyms
- Flabellina llerae Ortea, 1989

= Luisella llerae =

Species of gastropod

Luisella llerae is a species of sea slug, an aeolid nudibranch, a marine heterobranchia mollusc in the family Samlidae.

== Distribution ==
L. llerae can be found in Cape Verdes.
