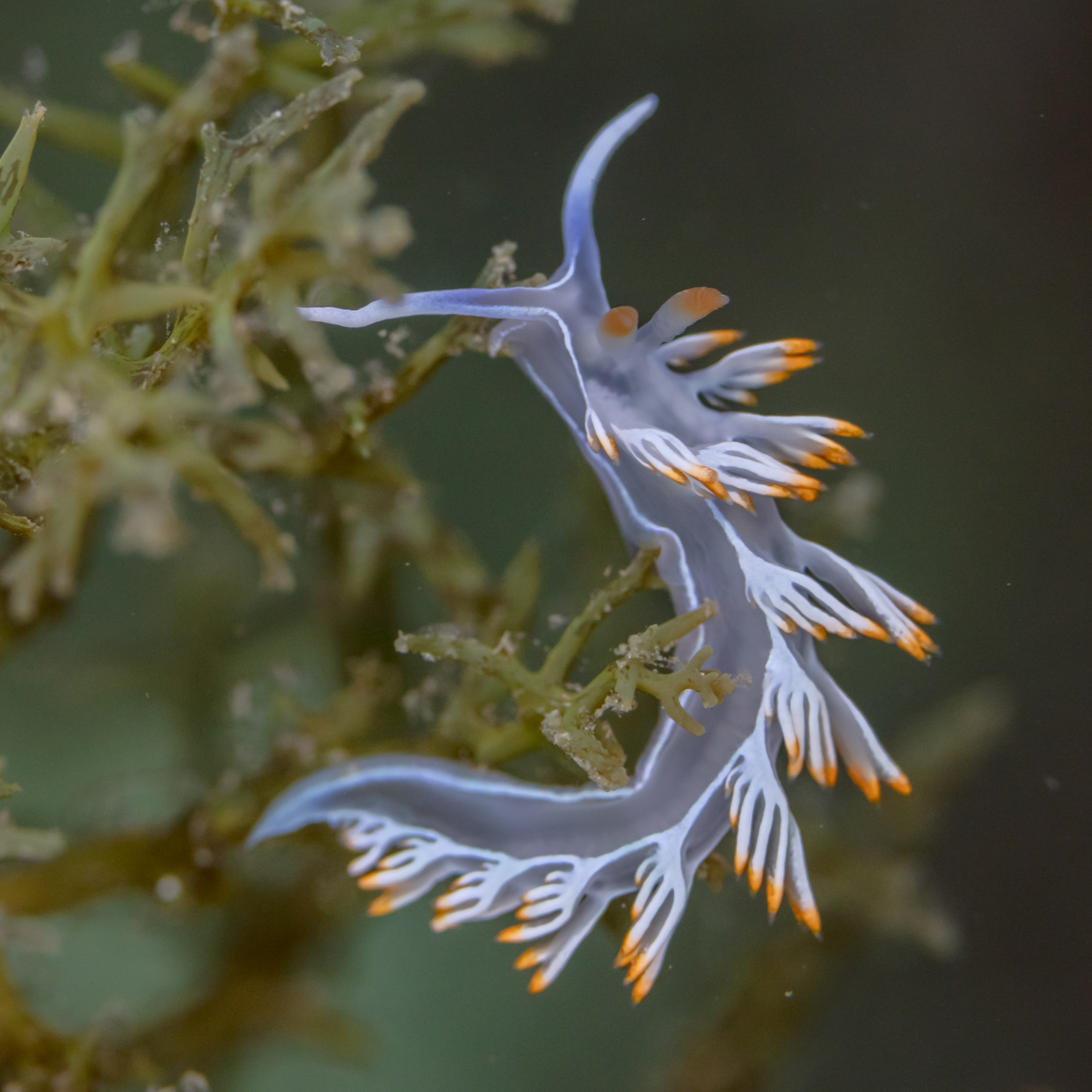
- Luisella babai

Scientific classification
- Kingdom: Animalia
- Phylum: Mollusca
- Class: Gastropoda
- Order: Nudibranchia
- Suborder: Aeolidacea
- Family: Samlidae
- Genus: Luisella; Korshunova, Martynov, Bakken, Evertsen, Fletcher, Mudianta, Saito, Lundin, Schrödl & Picton, 2017

Type species
- Luisella babai (Schmekel, 1972)

= Luisella =

Genus of gastropods

Luisella is a genus of sea slugs, specifically aeolid nudibranchs, marine gastropod molluscs in the family Samlidae.

Until recently, it was a monotypic genus.

== Species ==
Currently, species within Luisella include

- Luisella babai (Schmekel, 1972)
- Luisella bulbosa (Ortea & Espinosa, 1998)
- Luisella engeli (Ev. Marcus & Er. Marcus, 1968)
- Luisella llerae (Ortea, 1989)
- Luisella telja (Ev. Marcus & Er. Marcus, 1967)

== Bibliography ==
- Gary R. McDonald, University of California Santa Cruz Nudibranch Systematic Index University of California Santa Cruz (PDF), in Institute of Marine Sciences (2006).
- Egidio Trainito, Nudibranchi del Mediterraneo. Guida al riconoscimento dei molluschi opistobranchi, 2005ª ed., Milano, Il Castello, 2005, ISBN 88-8039-438-X.
