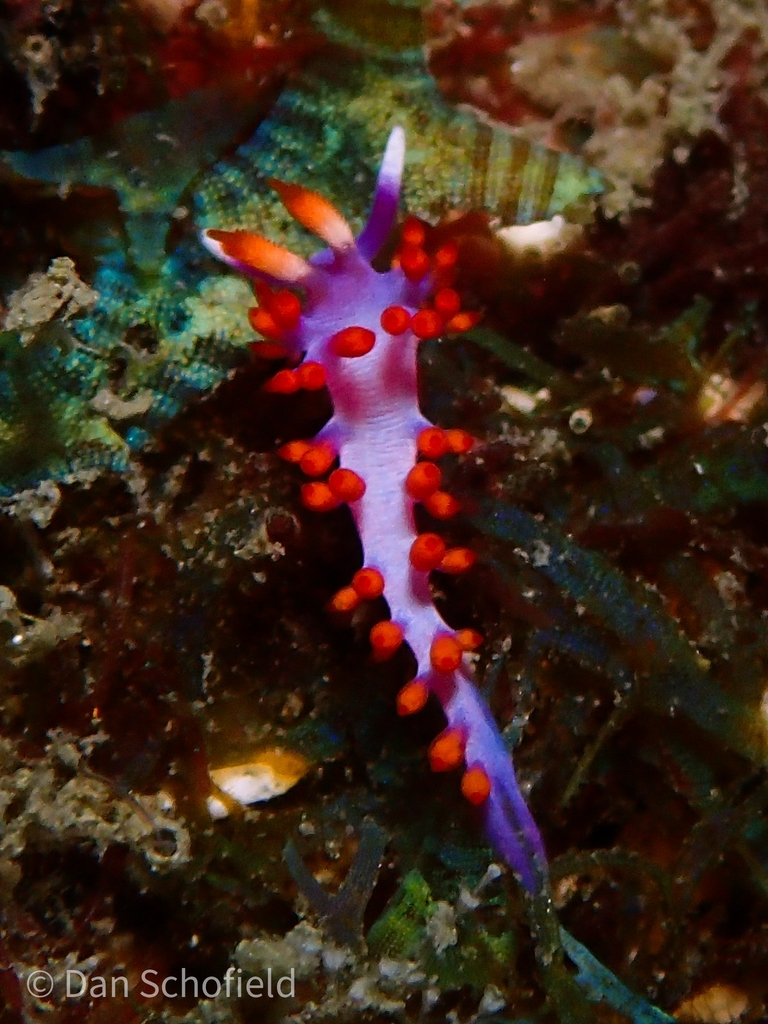

Scientific classification
- Kingdom: Animalia
- Phylum: Mollusca
- Class: Gastropoda
- Order: Nudibranchia
- Suborder: Aeolidacea
- Family: Flabellinidae
- Genus: Launsina
- Species: L. rubropurpurata

Binomial name
- Launsina rubropurpurata (Gosliner & Williams, 1991)

Synonyms
- Flabellina rubropupurata Gosliner & Willan, 1991; Samla rubropurpurata (Gosliner & Willan, 1991)

= Launsina rubropurpurata =

Species of gastropod

Launsina rubropurpurata is a species of sea slug, an aeolid nudibranch, a marine heterobranch mollusc in the family Samlidae.

== Description ==
L. rubropurpurata have a maximum length of 15mm (1.5 cm) and has a purple hue throughout the body tissues, overlaid by a white frosting of superficial pigment on the back and sides. The tips of the cerata and rhinophores are orange and the outer part of the oral tentacles is also overlain with white pigment.

== Distribution ==
The species was described from Madang, Papua New Guinea with an additional specimen from Sodwana Bay, Natal, South Africa. It is thought to be distributed throughout the Indo-West Pacific. It has been reported from Hawaii but significant differences in colouration make this identification doubtful.
