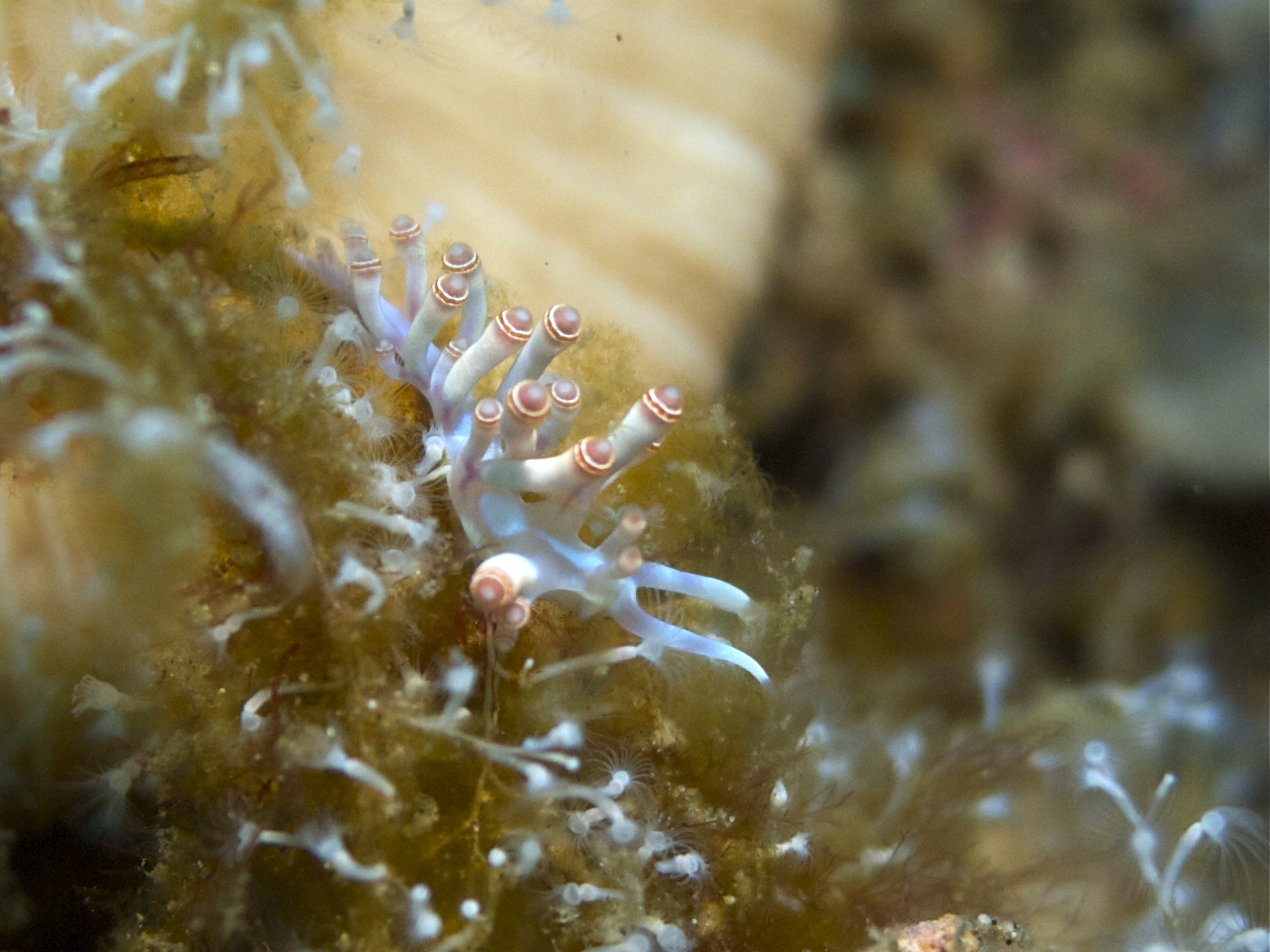
- Samla bilas

Scientific classification
- Kingdom: Animalia
- Phylum: Mollusca
- Class: Gastropoda
- Order: Nudibranchia
- Suborder: Aeolidacea
- Family: Samlidae
- Genus: Samla
- Species: S. bilas

Binomial name
- Samla bilas (Gosliner & Willan, 1991)

= Samla bilas =

Species of gastropod

Samla bilas is a species of sea slug, an aeolid nudibranch, a marine heterobranch mollusc in the family Samlidae.

== Description ==
Samla bilas has a body length of 18–35 mm (1.8-3.5 cm).

== Distribution ==
This species is widely distributed in the Indo-West Pacific and commonly seen on reefs.
