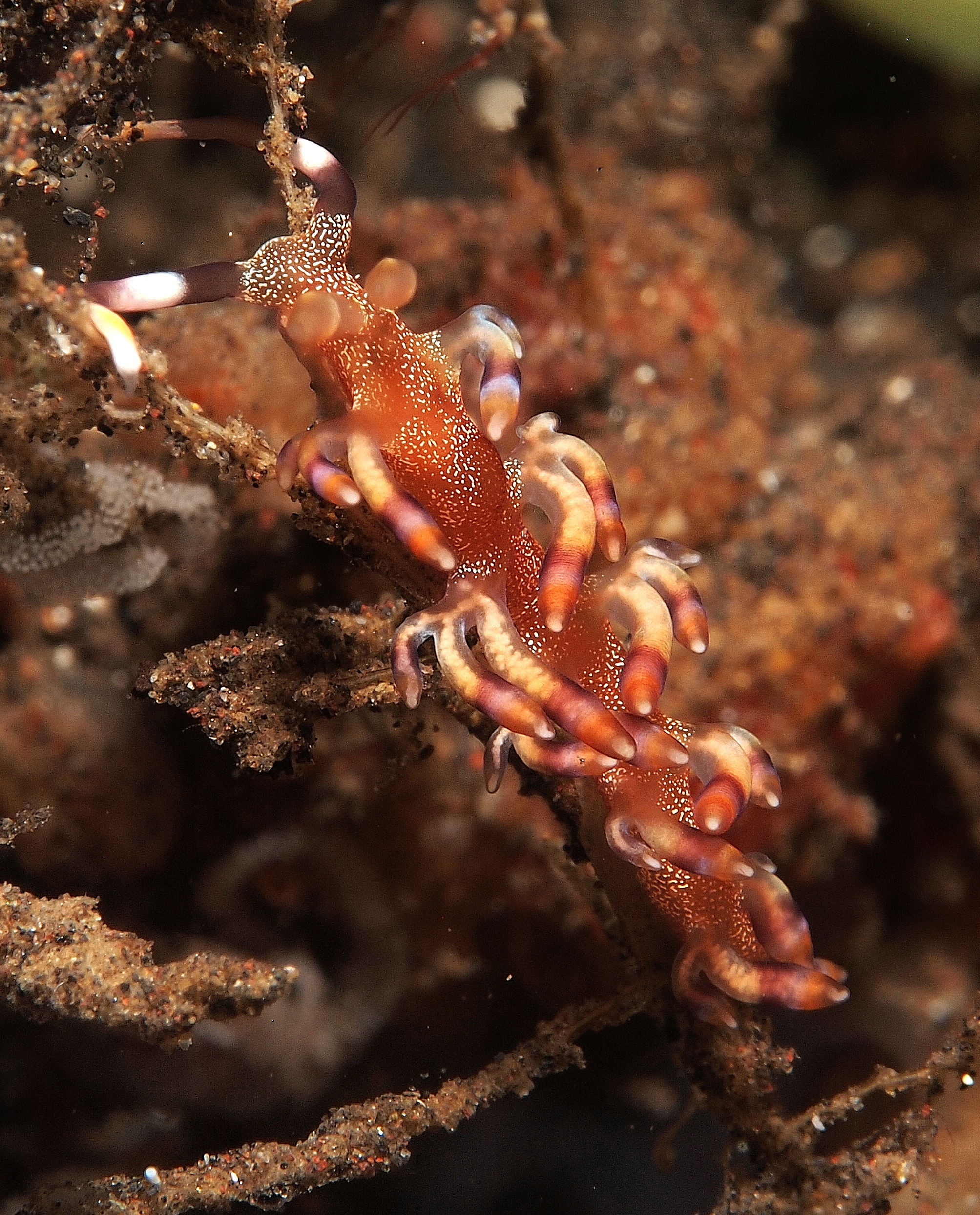

Scientific classification
- Kingdom: Animalia
- Phylum: Mollusca
- Class: Gastropoda
- Order: Nudibranchia
- Suborder: Aeolidacea
- Family: Samlidae
- Genus: Samla
- Species: S. riwo

Binomial name
- Samla riwo (Gosliner & Willan, 1991)

Synonyms
- Flabellina riwo Gosliner & Willan, 1991

= Samla riwo =

Species of gastropod

Samla riwo is a species of sea slug, an aeolid nudibranch, a marine heterobranch mollusc in the family Samlidae.

== Distribution ==
This species was described from Madang, Papua New Guinea. It is reported from sites throughout the Indo-West Pacific.

== Description ==
Samla riwo typically reaches a length of 20 mm when fully mature. It has a translucent white body covered with a lacy, white network of pigment. The oral tentacles are expanded at the tips into spear-like points or paddles. The bottom 2/3 of each of the cerata is translucent with pale peach-coloured digestive gland. Above this region there is a purple band around the ceras, followed by a white tip. The rhinophores have a bare, cylindrical basal region followed by a perfoliate club with 16-22 densely packed lamellae.
