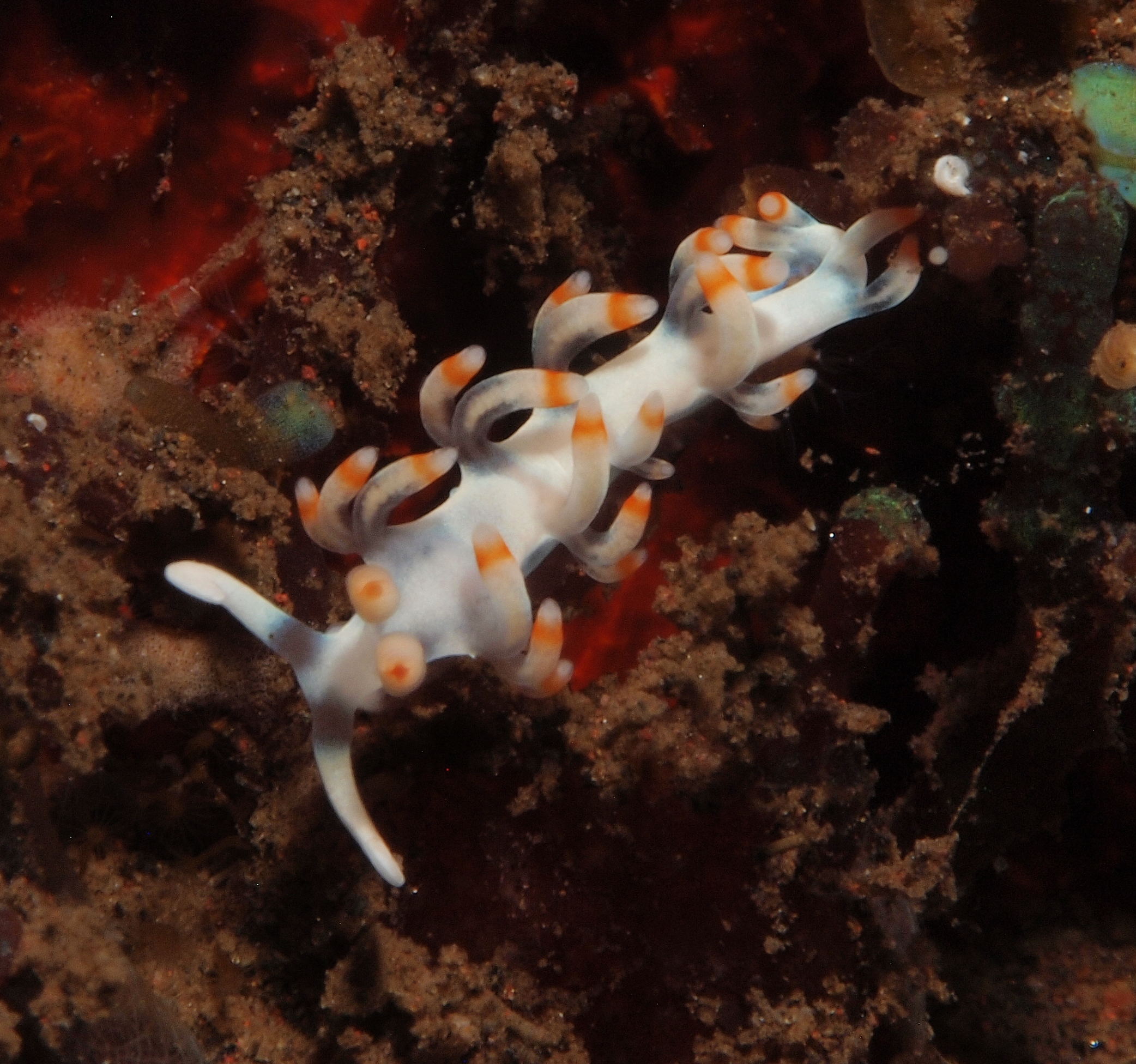

Scientific classification
- Kingdom: Animalia
- Phylum: Mollusca
- Class: Gastropoda
- Order: Nudibranchia
- Suborder: Aeolidacea
- Family: Samlidae
- Genus: Samla
- Species: S. bicolor

Binomial name
- Samla bicolor (Kelaart, 1858)

= Samla bicolor =

Species of gastropod

Samla bicolor is a species of sea slug, an aeolid nudibranch, a marine heterobranch mollusc in the family Samlidae.

== Distribution ==
This species was described from Ceylon. It is widely distributed in the Indo-Pacific region. In Hawaii it can be commonly found in Big Island, Maui, Oahu, Niihau, Laysan, Midway and Kure.

== Description ==
Samla bicolor can grow to a maximum length of 20 mm and has a translucent body and white tips to the oral tentacles. There is an orange band near the tip of the rhinophores and on each of the cerata. Animals from different regions show subtle differences in coloration and in the shape of the oral tentacles and may be members of a species complex.
