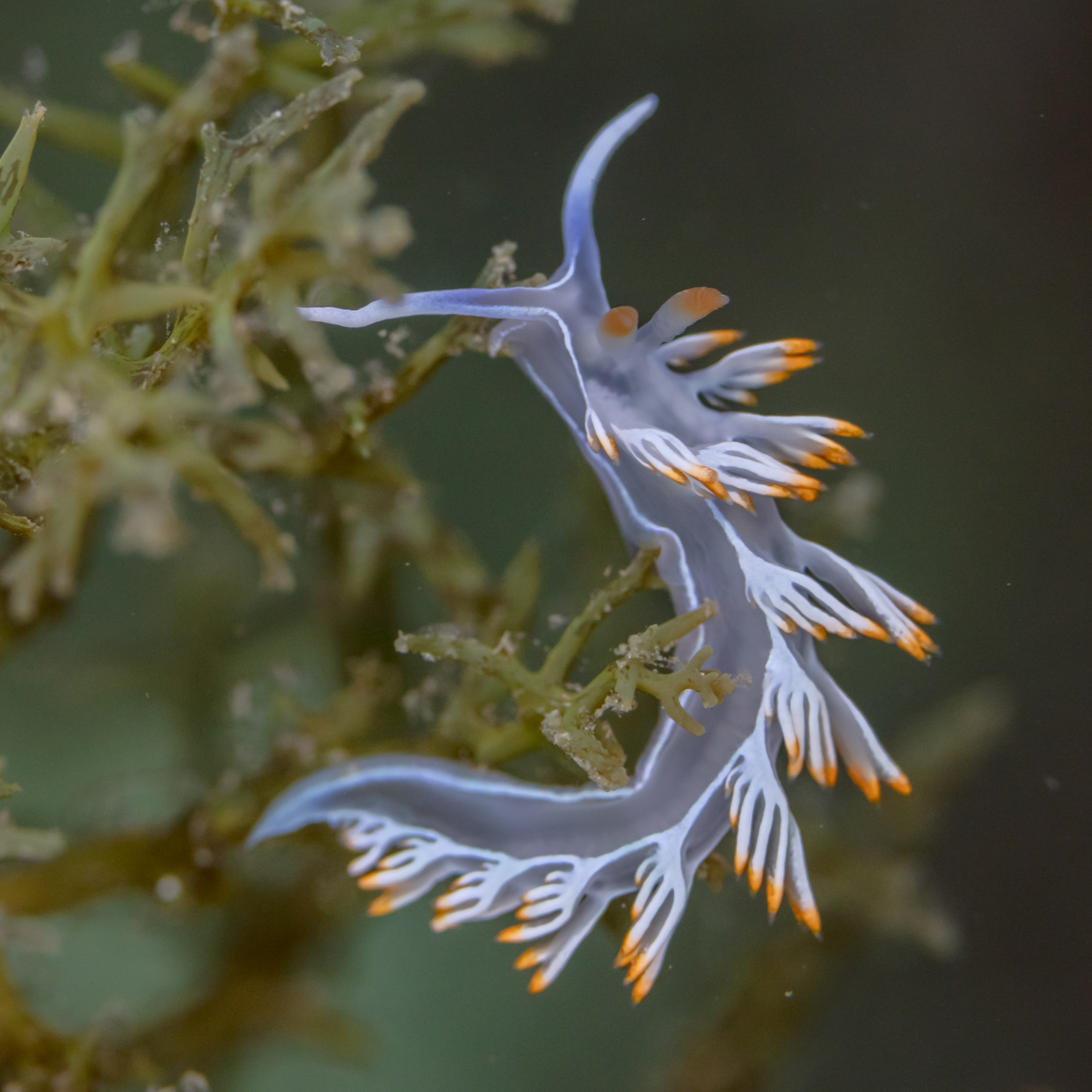
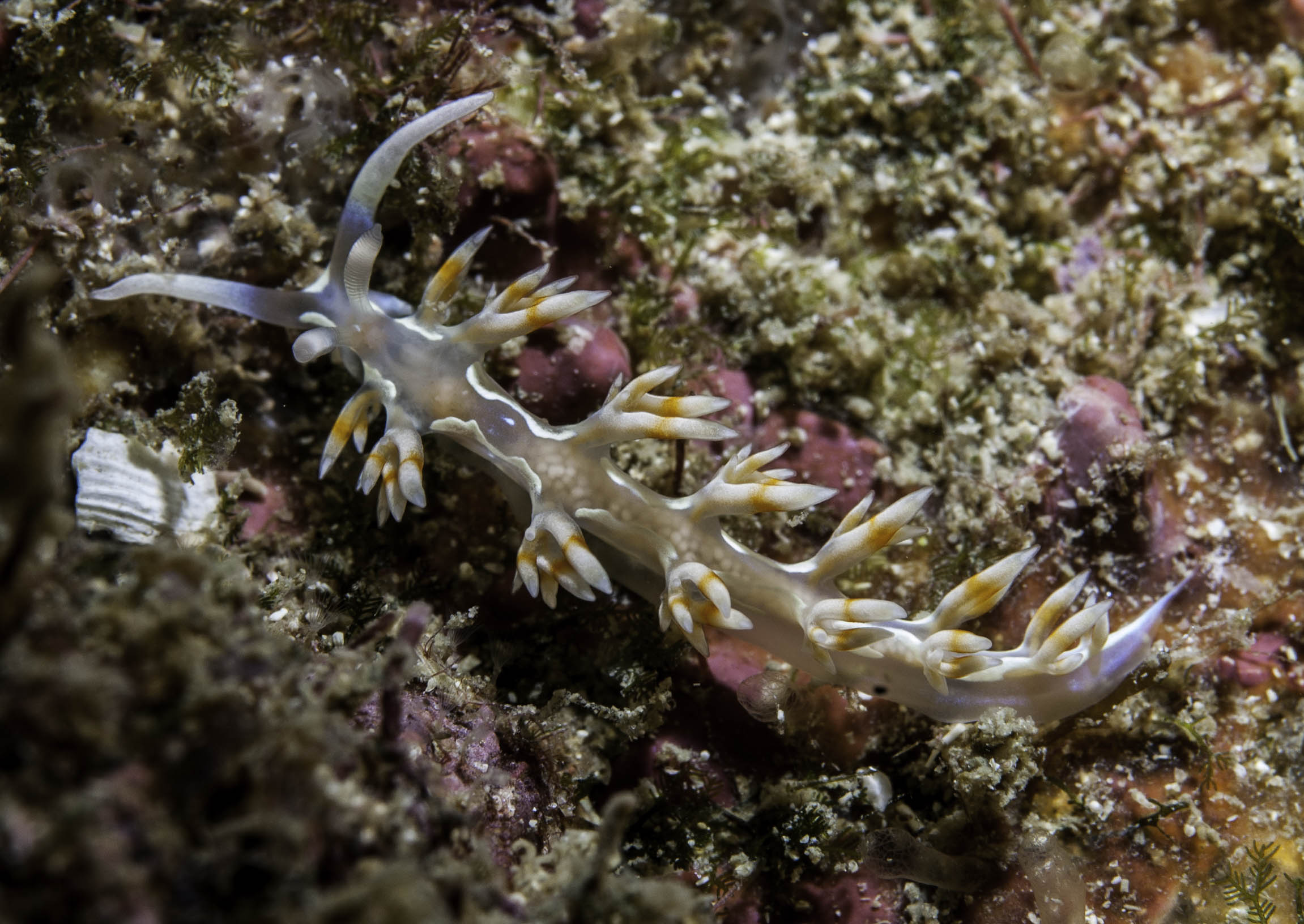
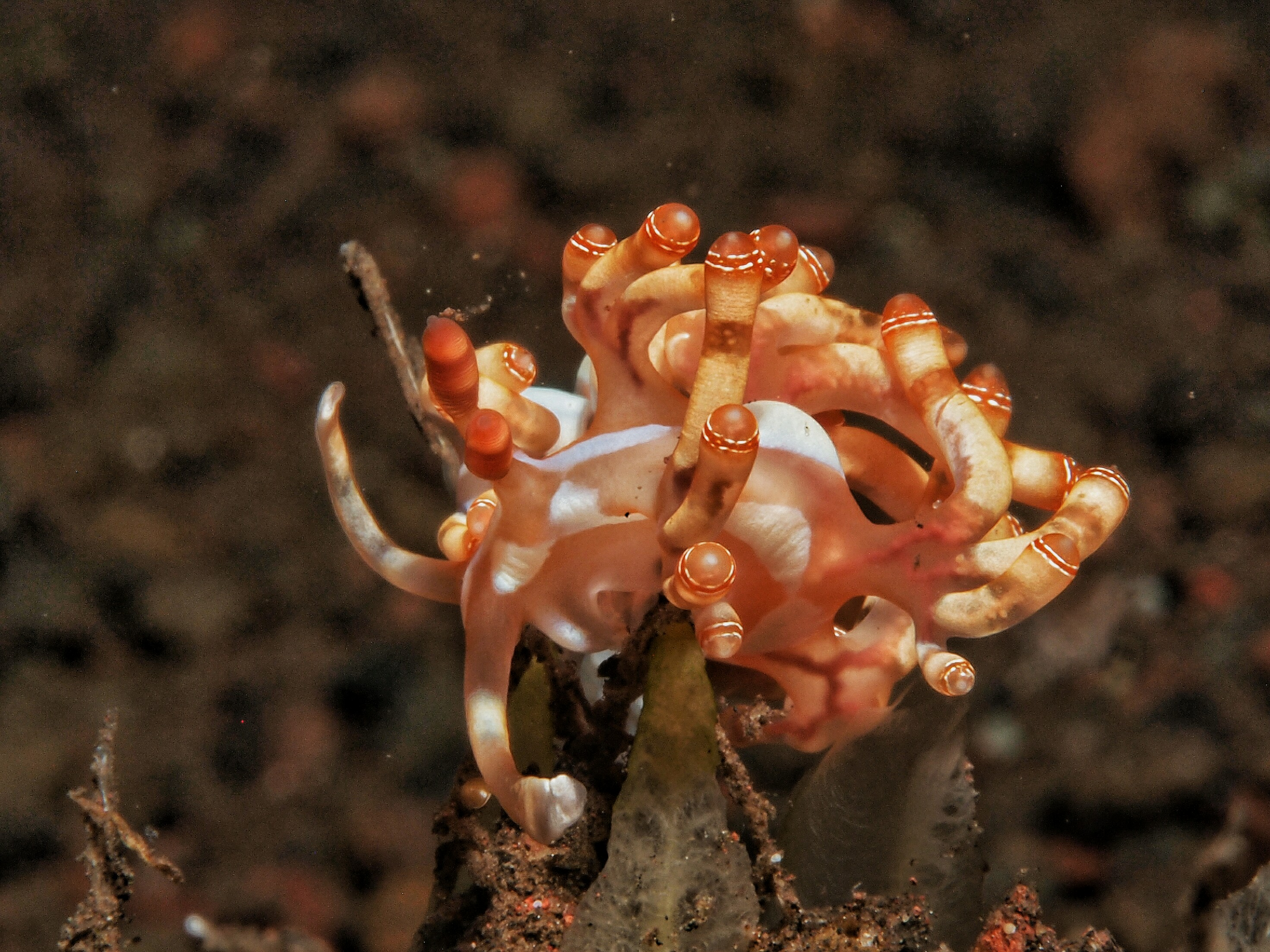
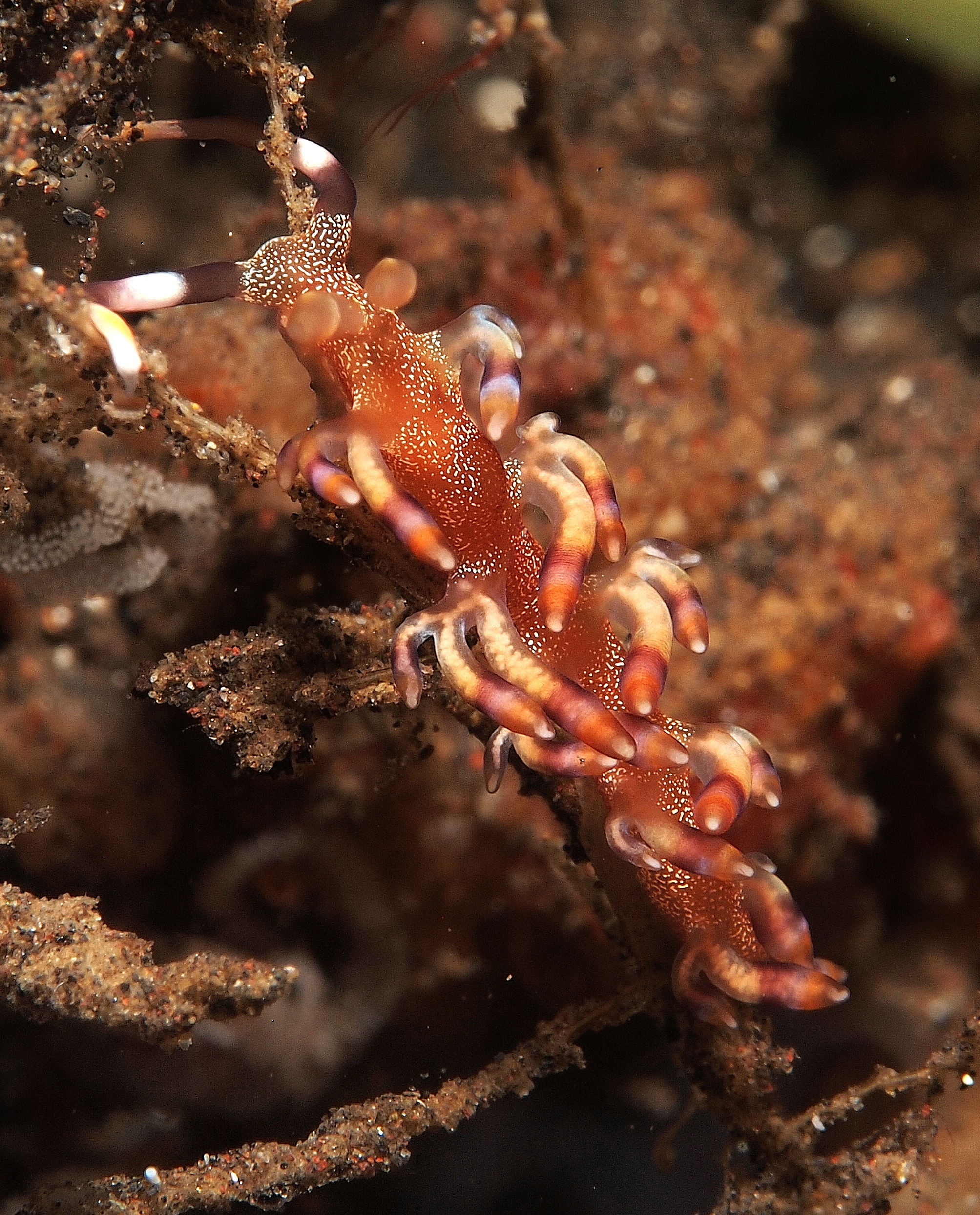
- From left to right of each row, from top to bottom: Luisella babai, Luisella engeli, Samla bilas, and Samla riwo

Scientific classification
- Kingdom: Animalia
- Phylum: Mollusca
- Class: Gastropoda
- Order: Nudibranchia
- Suborder: Aeolidacea
- Superfamily: Samloidea; Korshunova, Martynov, Bakken, Evertsen, Fletcher, Mudianta, Saito, Lundin, Schrödl & Picton, 2017
- Family: Samlidae; Korshunova, Martynov, Bakken, Evertsen, Fletcher, Mudianta, Saito, Lundin, Schrödl & Picton, 2017

Type genus
- Samla Bergh, 1900

Genera
- See text

= Samlidae =

Family of gastropods

Samlidae is a family of nudibranchs, shell-less marine gastropod molluscs or sea slugs. It is the only family within the superfamily Samloidea.

== Genera and species ==
Genera within the family Samlidae include:

- Luisella Korshunova, Martynov, Bakken, Evertsen, Fletcher, Mudianta, Saito, Lundin, Schrödl & Picton, 2017
- Samla Bergh, 1900
