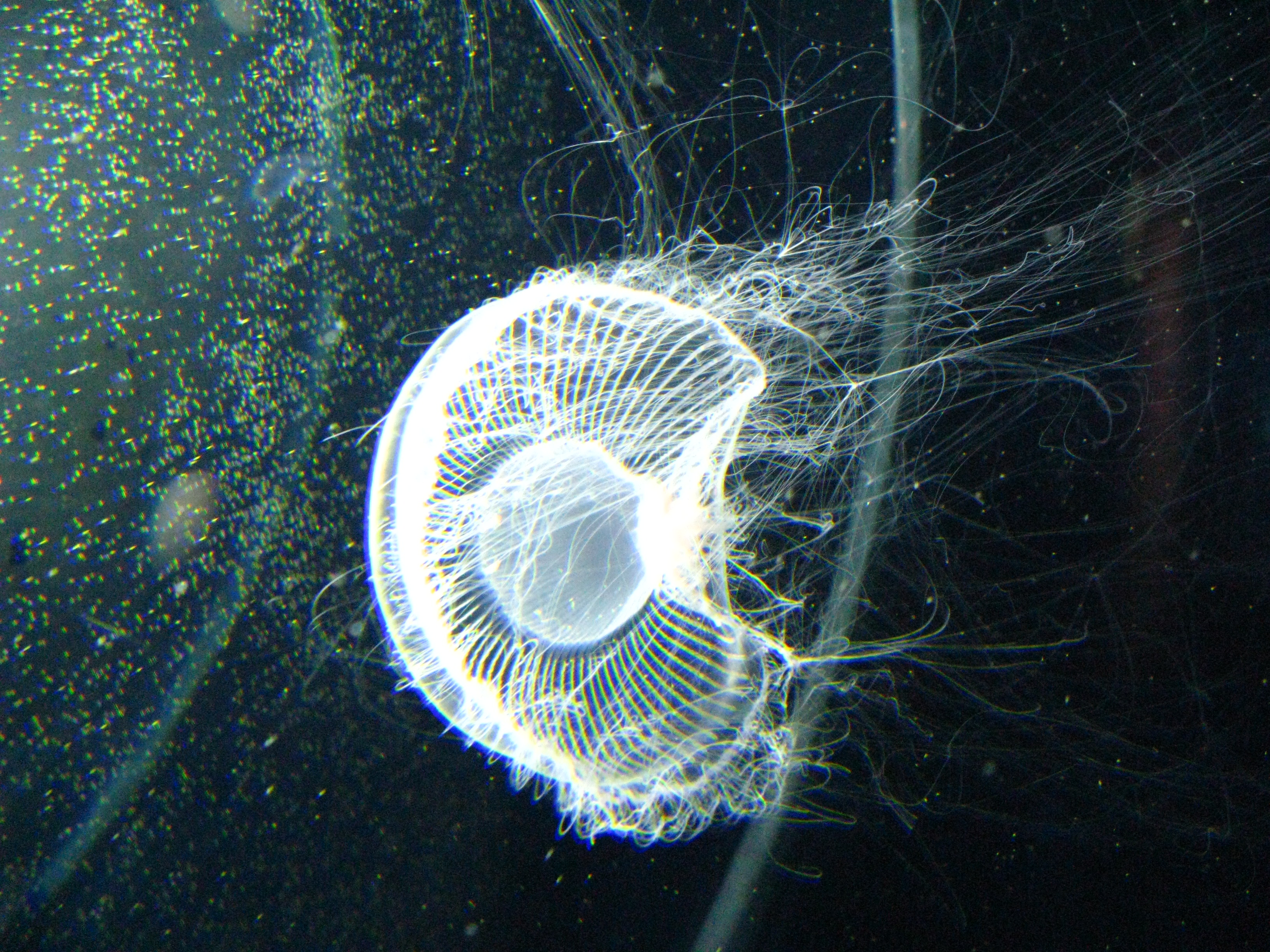
- Aequorea coerulescens medusa (Aequoreidae)

Scientific classification
- Kingdom: Animalia
- Phylum: Cnidaria
- Class: Hydrozoa
- Order: Leptothecata
- Suborder: Conica; Broch, 1910

Superfamilies
- Campanulinoidea (disputed); Plumularioidea; Sertularioidea and see text

= Conica (suborder) =

Suborder of hydrozoans

Conica are a cnidarian suborder of the Leptomedusae (thecate hydroids). They make up the bulk of their order; their internal relationships are not well resolved, and most of the roughly 30 families are not yet assigned to a superfamily.

They are named for the distinctive shape of their hypostome, the "tip" of the polyps' body where the mouth is located. As opposed to the smaller thecate suborder Proboscidoidea with their elongated hypostome, the Conica have a simple hypostome without a pregastric cavity and a shape that is generally round or conical.

Well-known members of the Conica are the "air fern" (Sertilaria argentea) of the Sertulariidae which is sold dried as novelty "plants" and aquarium ornaments, and the Crystal Jelly (Aequorea victoria) of the Aequoreidae, a bioluminescent hydrozoan.

== Systematics ==
Apart from the families assigned to the three named superfamilies, there are many Conica that are presently unassigned as to superfamily, either because their relationships and/or validity remain unknown or because they represent minor but very ancient lineages basal to the three main radiations within this order:

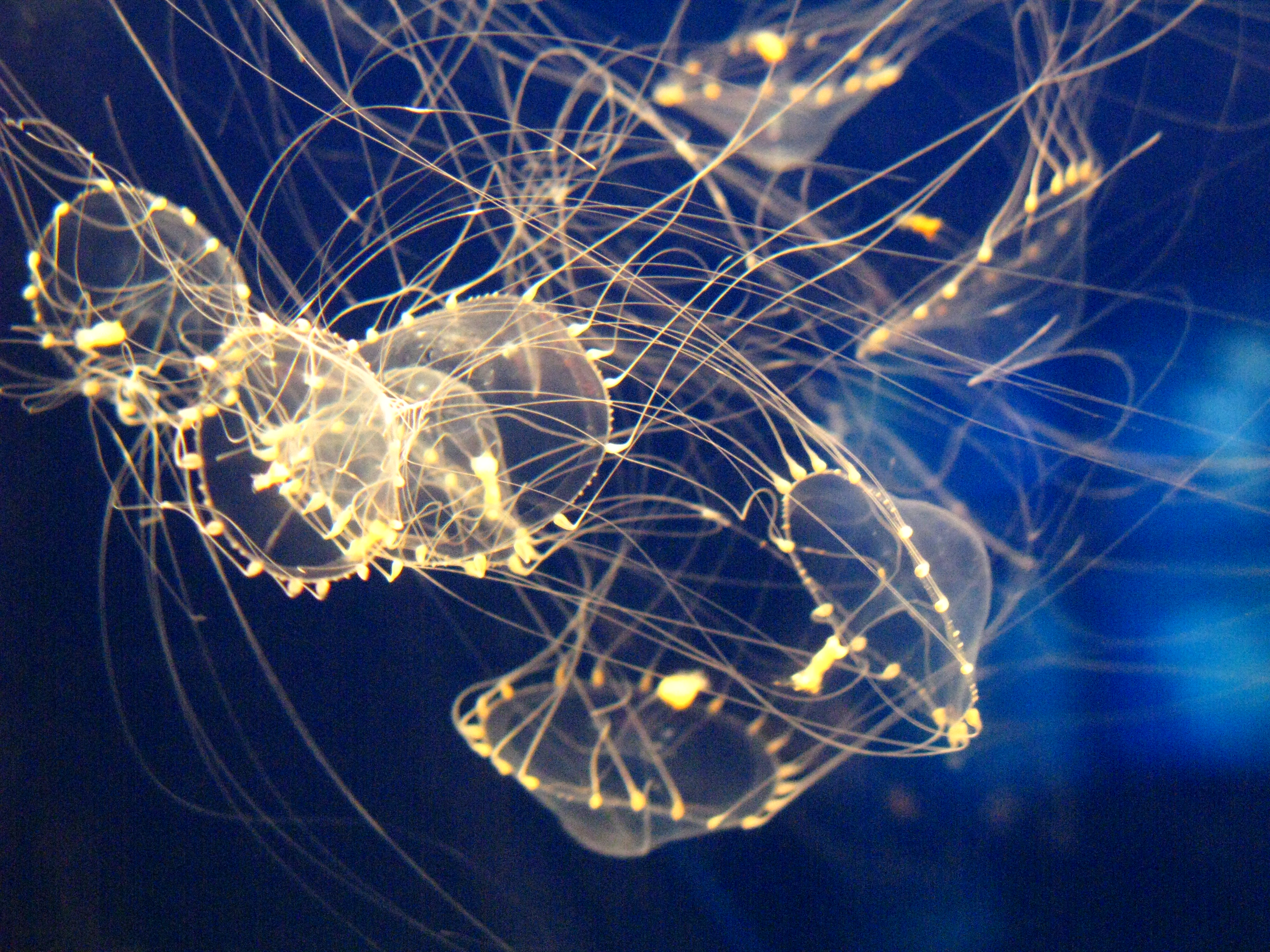
Medusae of Tima formosa (Eirenidae)

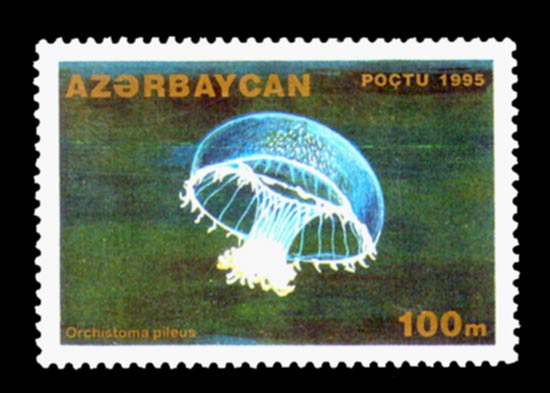
Azerbaijani postal stamp depicting medusa of Orchistoma pileus (Orchistomatidae)

Basal and incertae sedis

- Family Aequoreidae
- Family Barcinidae
- Family Clathrozoellidae (often included in Clathrozoidae or placed in Anthomedusae)
- Family Clathrozoidae Stechow, 1921
- Family Dipleurosomatidae
- Family Eirenidae (including Eutimidae, Timoididae)
- Family Haleciidae
- Family Lafoeidae (including Hebellidae)
- Family Laodiceidae
- Family Lovenellidae (including Eucheilotidae)
- Family Malagazziidae
- Family Melicertidae
- Family Mitrocomidae Haeckel, 1879
- Family Octocannoidae
- Family Orchistomatidae
- Family Phialellidae
- Family Sugiuridae
- Family Syntheciidae
- Family Teclaiidae
- Family Tiarannidae
- Family Tiaropsidae Boero, Bouillon & Danovaro, 1987
- Family Zygophylaxidae (often included in Lafoeidae)

Superfamily Campanulinoidea (disputed)

- Family Blackfordiidae
- Family Calycellidae (often included in Campanulinidae)
- Family Campanulinidae
- Family Lineolariidae (often included in Campanulinidae)

Superfamily Plumularioidea (4 families)

Superfamily Sertularioidea

- Family Sertulariidae Fleming, 1828
- Family Thyroscyphidae
