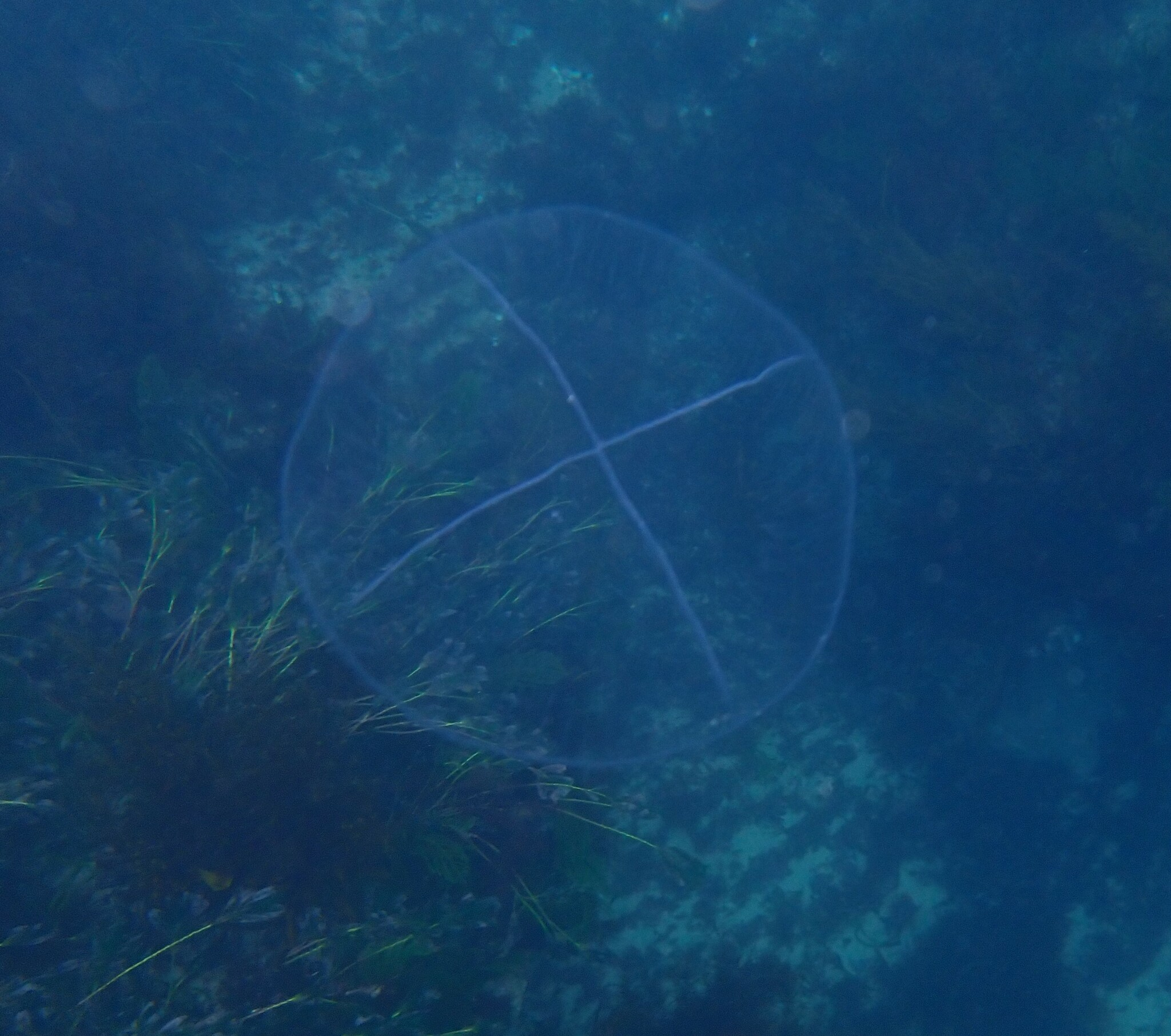

Scientific classification
- Kingdom: Animalia
- Phylum: Cnidaria
- Class: Hydrozoa
- Order: Leptothecata
- Family: Laodiceidae
- Genus: Staurostoma
- Species: S. falklandica

Binomial name
- Staurostoma falklandica (Browne, 1907)

Synonyms
- Staurophora falklandica Browne, 1907

= Staurostoma falklandica =

Species of jellyfish

Staurostoma falklandica is a species of jellyfish first discovered in 1907 by the Scottish Antarctic Expedition aboard the S.S. Scotia in Stanley Harbour, Falkland Islands.

== Description ==
Staurostoma falklandica is very similar to the related White cross jellyfish, with the distinguishing feature being the much more diminutive second set of tentacles.

It has a thin umbrella, measuring 90mm in diameter, with a stomach in four radiating arms across it. The mouth is the same length as the stomach, and its edges are a complicated series of folds. The gonads are along the edge of the stomach in deeper folds.

There are several hundred principal tentacles closely packed round the edge of the bell. In between each pair of tentacles is a much smaller tentacle, similar in shape. Between the smaller and larger tentacles is a cordylus (sensory club).

== Range ==
Staurostoma falklandica is a marine species which inhabits the southern hemisphere near Antarctica. Observations have been made in Chile, Argentina, Australia and New Zealand.
