= Melicerta =

Melicerta may refer to:

- Melicerta, a genus of cnidarians in the family Melicertidae, synonym of Melicertum
- Melicerta, a genus of crustaceans in the family Hippolytidae, synonym of Lysmata
- Melicerta, a genus of rotifers in the family Flosculariidae, synonym of Floscularia
