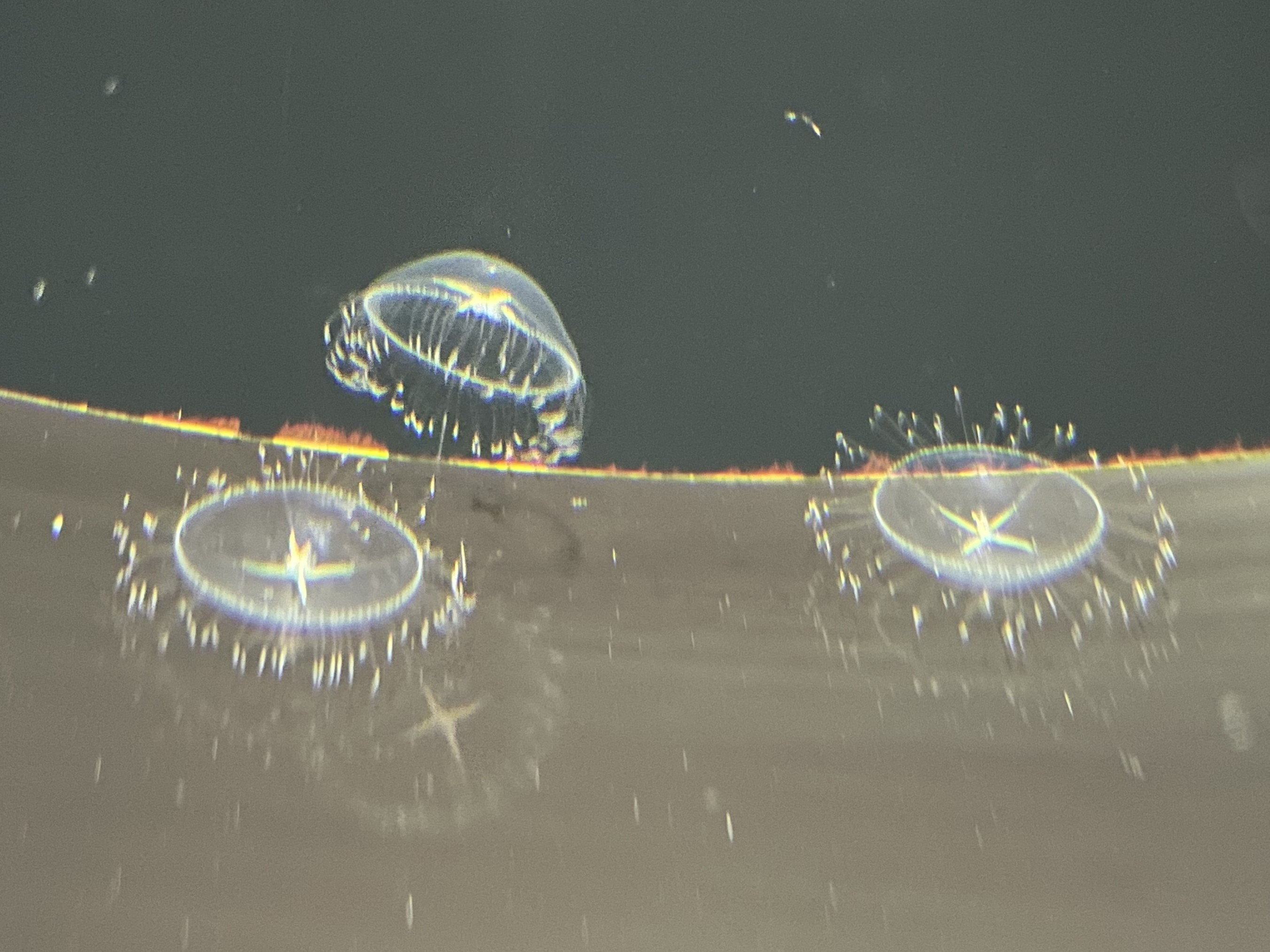

Scientific classification
- Kingdom: Animalia
- Phylum: Cnidaria
- Class: Hydrozoa
- Order: Leptothecata
- Family: Laodiceidae
- Genus: Laodicea
- Species: L. undulata

Binomial name
- Laodicea undulata Forbes & Goodsir, 1853

= Laodicea undulata =

Species of hydrozoan

Laodicea undulata is a species of cnidarian of the family Laodiceidae described in 1853. It has been recorded in most of the Atlantic Ocean, the Mediterranean Sea, and the North Sea.

L. undulata is considered to be biologically immortal through its ability to undergo ontogeny reversal, which refers to it being able to asexually transform from the medusa stage into a polyp.

== Description ==
The diameter of its bell has been recorded up to 37 mm, but slightly less in British waters, and has 200-600 marginal tentacles.
