= Acryptolaria elegans =

Scientific classification
- Domain: Eukaryota
- Kingdom: Animalia
- Phylum: Cnidaria
- Class: Hydrozoa
- Order: Leptothecata
- Family: Lafoeidae
- Genus: Acryptolaria
- Species: A. elegans

Binomial name
- Acryptolaria elegans (Allman, 1877)

Synonyms
- Cryptolaria elegans Allman, 1877

Species of hydrozoan

Acryptolaria elegans is a species of hydrozoan in the family Lafoeidae. It is found in the Gulf of Mexico.
