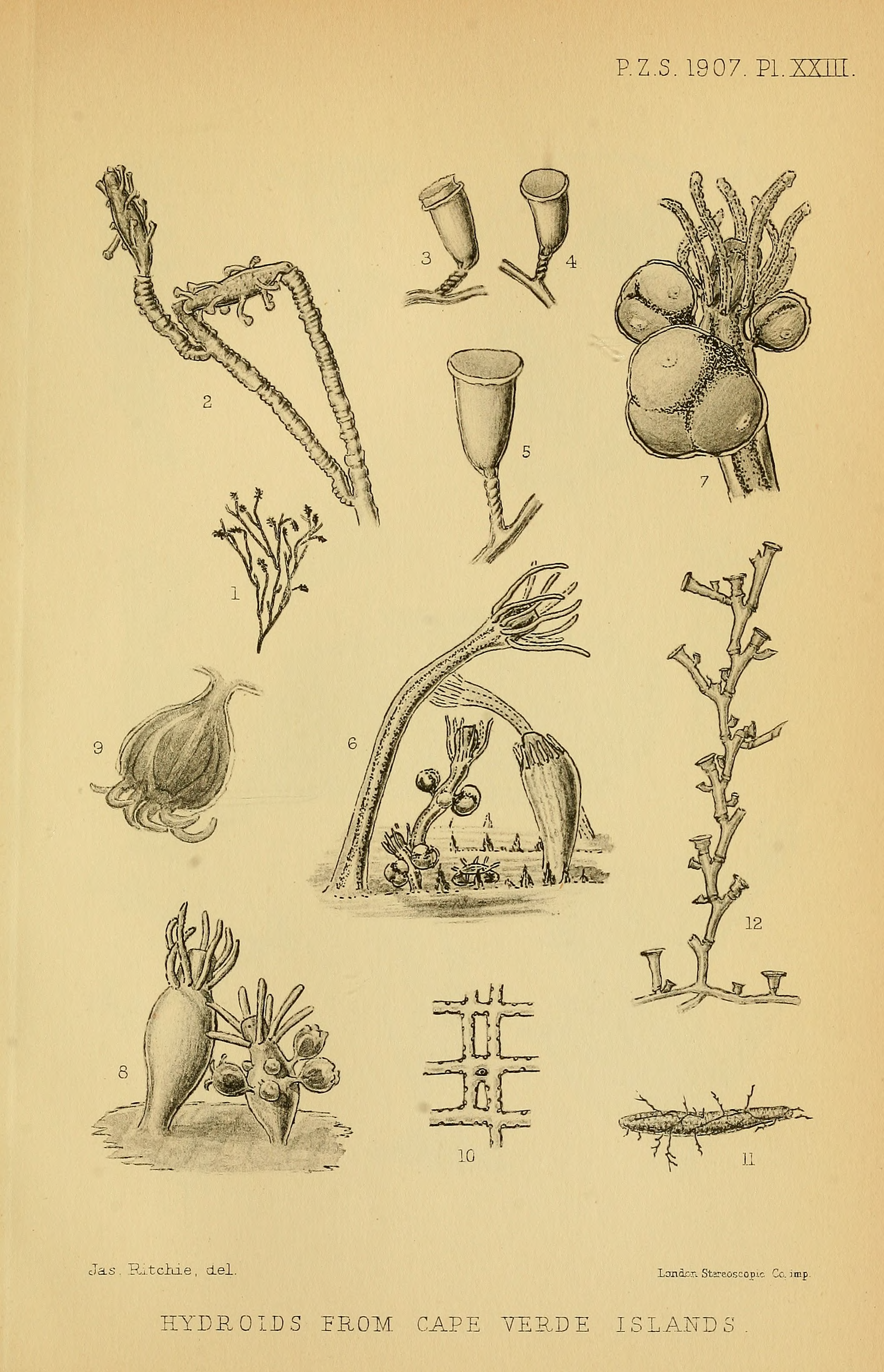
- Numbers 3, 4 and 5 (top) Campanularia mutabilis

Scientific classification
- Domain: Eukaryota
- Kingdom: Animalia
- Phylum: Cnidaria
- Class: Hydrozoa
- Order: Leptothecata
- Family: Hebellidae
- Genus: Scandia
- Species: S. mutabilis

Binomial name
- Scandia mutabilis (Ritchie, 1907)

Synonyms
- Campanularia mutabilis Ritchie

= Scandia mutabilis =

Species of sponge

Scandia mutabilis is a species of hydroids of the family Hebellidae. It was first described in 1907 by James Ritchie from specimens obtained from Cape Verde. It also occurs in the Gulf of Mexico.
