= Modeeria sagamina =

Scientific classification
- Kingdom: Animalia
- Phylum: Cnidaria
- Class: Hydrozoa
- Order: Leptothecata
- Family: Tiarannidae
- Genus: Modeeria
- Species: M. sagamina

Binomial name
- Modeeria sagamina (Uchida, 1948)

Synonyms
- Tiaranna sagamina Uchida, 1948

Species of Cnidarian

Modeeria sagamina is a species of hydrozoan belonging to the family Tiarannidae.

It is a jellyfish which was first described in 1948 as Tiaranna sagamina by Tohru Uchida, from a specimen collected in Sagami Bay on March 31, 1938.
