= Conica =

Conica may refer to:

- Conica (book) by Apollonius of Perga
- Conica (Hydrozoa), a suborder of Leptomedusa
- Several species with the epithet capitata:
  - Annona conica (= Raimondia conica), a custard apple
  - Fonscochlea conica, a snail
  - Knema conica, a plant related to nutmeg
  - Paludinella conica, a snail
  - Phrantela conica, a snail
  - Pyrgulopsis conica, the Kingman Springsnail
  - Samoana conica, a snail
  - Shorea conica, a dipterocarp tree
