= Scandia (cnidarian) =

Scientific classification
- Domain: Eukaryota
- Kingdom: Animalia
- Phylum: Cnidaria
- Class: Hydrozoa
- Order: Leptothecata
- Family: Hebellidae
- Genus: Scandia; Fraser, 1912

Synonyms
- Croatella Hadzi, 1916

Genus of hydrozoans

Scandia is a genus of hydrozoans in the family Hebellidae.

Species include:

- Scandia corrugata Fraser, 1938
- Scandia gigas (Pieper, 1884)
- Scandia michaelsarsi (Leloup, 1935)
- Scandia minor (Fraser, 1938)
- Scandia mutabilis (Ritchie, 1907)
- Scandia neglecta (Stechow, 1913)
