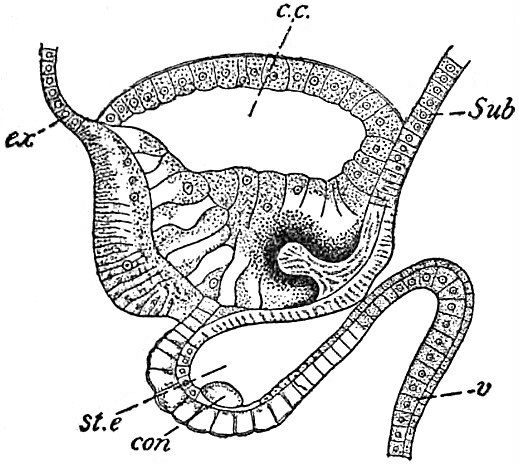
- Section of a statocyst and ocellus of Tiaropsis diademata

Scientific classification
- Kingdom: Animalia
- Phylum: Cnidaria
- Class: Hydrozoa
- Order: Leptothecata
- Family: Tiaropsidae
- Genus: Tiaropsis; Agassiz, 1849

= Tiaropsis =

Genus of hydrozoans

Tiaropsis is a genus of hydrozoans belonging to the family Tiaropsidae.

The species of this genus are found in Atlantic and Pacific Ocean.

Species:

- Tiaropsis gordoni Bouillon & Barnett, 1999
- Tiaropsis multicirrata (M. Sars, 1835)

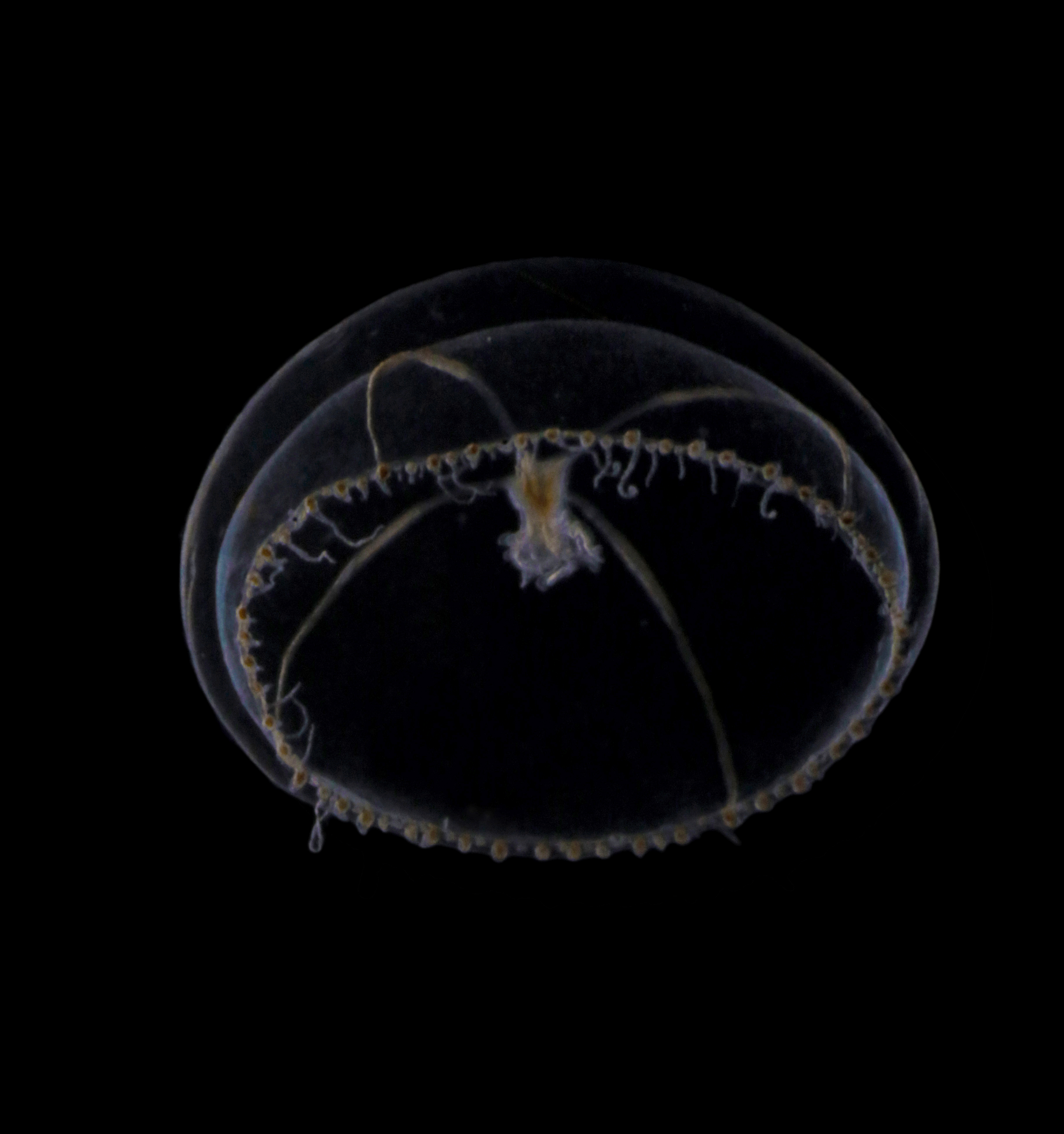
Tiaropsis multicirrata

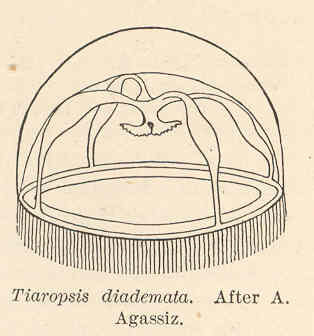
Tiaropsis multicirrata
