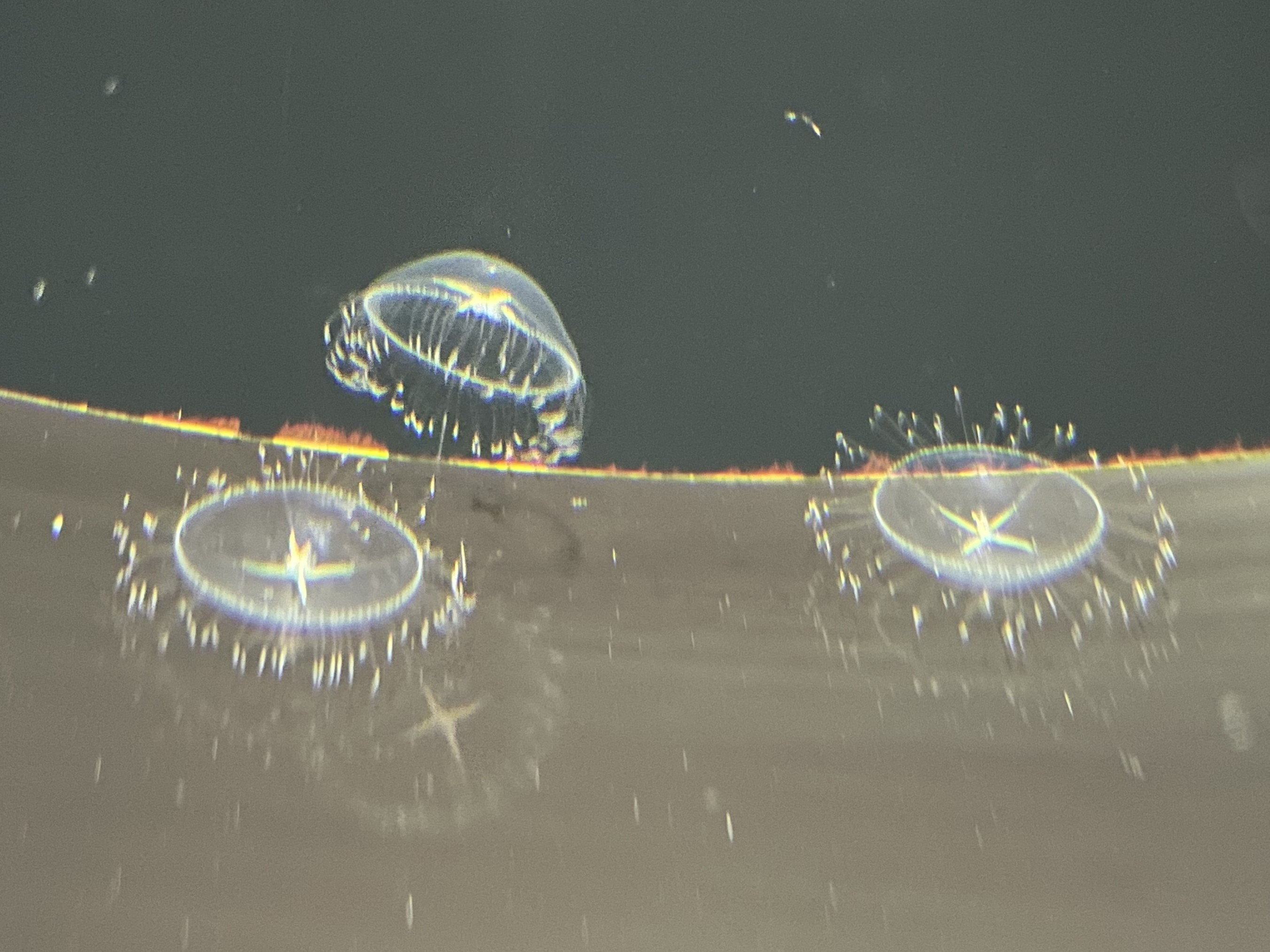
- Laodicea undulata

Scientific classification
- Kingdom: Animalia
- Phylum: Cnidaria
- Class: Hydrozoa
- Order: Leptothecata
- Family: Laodiceidae
- Genus: Laodicea; Lesson, 1843

= Laodicea (cnidarian) =

Genus of hydrozoans

Laodicea is a genus of cnidarians of the family Laodiceidae. According to the World Register of Marine Species, the genus contains the following 8 described species, as well as 3 synonyms and 4 uncertain species:

- Laodicea brevigona Allwein, 1967
- Laodicea fertilis (Lendenfeld, 1885)
- Laodicea fijiana Agassiz & Mayer, 1899
- Laodicea indica Browne, 1905
- Laodicea marama Agassiz & Mayer, 1899
- Laodicea minuscula Vannucci, 1957
- Laodicea pulchra Browne, 1902
- Laodicea undulata (Forbes & Goodsir, 1853)
