= Staurodiscus =

- Staurodiscus gotoi

Scientific classification
- Kingdom: Animalia
- Phylum: Cnidaria
- Class: Hydrozoa
- Order: Leptothecata
- Family: Hebellidae
- Genus: Staurodiscus; Haeckel, 1879

Genus of hydrozoans

Staurodiscus is a genus of hydrozoans belonging to the family Hebellidae.

The species of this genus are found in Atlantic, Pacific, and Indian Ocean.

== Species ==
Species:

- Staurodiscus arcuatus (Haeckel, 1879)
- Staurodiscus brooksii (Mayer, 1910)
- Staurodiscus cirrus Huang, Guo & Qiu, 2010
