= Dipleurosoma =

Scientific classification
- Domain: Eukaryota
- Kingdom: Animalia
- Phylum: Cnidaria
- Class: Hydrozoa
- Order: Leptothecata
- Family: Dipleurosomatidae
- Genus: Dipleurosoma; Boeck, 1868

Genus of hydrozoans

Dipleurosoma is a genus of hydrozoans belonging to the family Dipleurosomatidae.

The species of this genus are found in Northern America.

== Species ==
- Dipleurosoma gemmifera Thiel, 1938
- Dipleurosoma pacificum Agassiz & Mayer, 1902
- Dipleurosoma typicum Boeck, 1868
