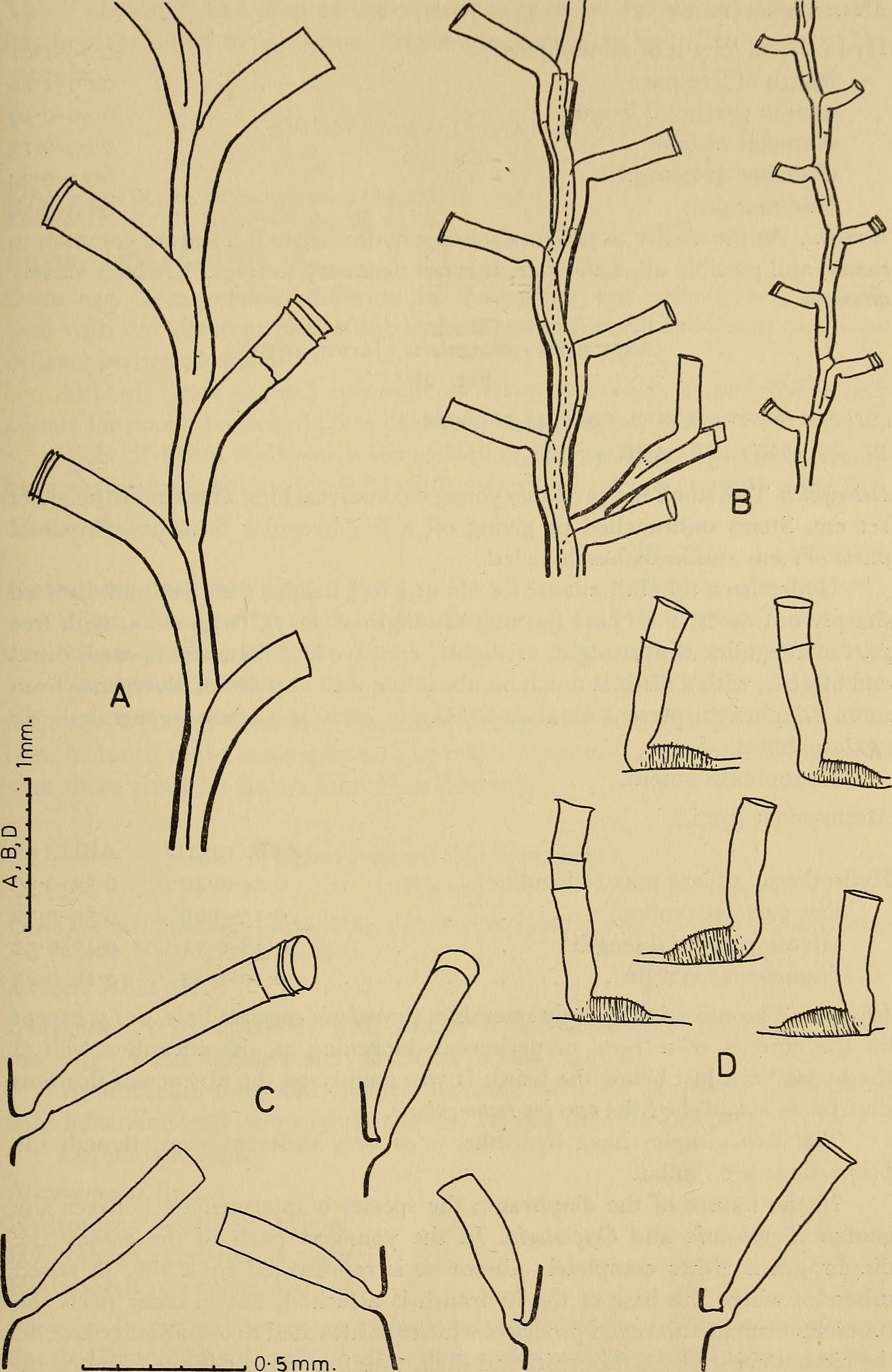
- Annals of the South African Museum - Annale van die Suid-Afrikaanse Museum (1966)

Scientific classification
- Domain: Eukaryota
- Kingdom: Animalia
- Phylum: Cnidaria
- Class: Hydrozoa
- Order: Leptothecata
- Family: Lafoeidae
- Genus: Acryptolaria; Norman, 1875

Species
- See text

= Acryptolaria =

Genus of hydrozoans

Acryptolaria is a genus of hydrozoans in the family Lafoeidae.

== Species ==
The following species are recognized in the genus Acryptolaria:

- Acryptolaria abies (Allman, 1877)
- Acryptolaria andersoni Totton, 1930
- Acryptolaria angulata (Bale, 1914)
- Acryptolaria arboriformis (Ritchie, 1911)
- Acryptolaria bathyalis Peña Cantero & Vervoort, 2010
- Acryptolaria bulbosa (Stechow, 1932)
- Acryptolaria conferta (Allman, 1877)
- Acryptolaria corniformis Naumov & Stepanjants, 1962
- Acryptolaria crassicaulis (Allman, 1888)
- Acryptolaria disordinata Peña Cantero & Vervoort, 2010
- Acryptolaria elegans (Allman, 1877)
- Acryptolaria encarnae Peña Cantero & Vervoort, 2010
- Acryptolaria flabelloides Peña Cantero & Vervoort, 2010
- Acryptolaria flabellum (Allman, 1888)
- Acryptolaria frigida Peña Cantero, 2014
- Acryptolaria gemini Peña Cantero & Vervoort, 2010
- Acryptolaria gracilis (Allman, 1888)
- Acryptolaria infinita Peña Cantero & Vervoort, 2010
- Acryptolaria intermedia Peña Cantero & Vervoort, 2010
- Acryptolaria inversa Peña Cantero & Vervoort, 2010
- Acryptolaria laertesi Peña Cantero & Vervoort, 2010
- Acryptolaria longitheca (Allman, 1877)
- Acryptolaria medeae Peña Cantero & Vervoort, 2010
- Acryptolaria minima Totton, 1930
- Acryptolaria minuta Watson, 2003
- Acryptolaria niobae Peña Cantero & Vervoort, 2010
- Acryptolaria norfolkensis Peña Cantero & Vervoort, 2010
- Acryptolaria novaecaledoniae Peña Cantero & Vervoort, 2010
- Acryptolaria operculata Stepanjants, 1979
- Acryptolaria profunda Peña Cantero & Vervoort, 2010
- Acryptolaria pseudoangulata Peña Cantero & Vervoort, 2010
- Acryptolaria pseudoundulata Peña Cantero & Vervoort, 2010
- Acryptolaria pulchella (Allman, 1888)
- Acryptolaria pygmaea Peña Cantero & Vervoort, 2010
- Acryptolaria rectangularis (Jarvis, 1922)
- Acryptolaria symmetrica (Nutting, 1906)
- Acryptolaria tetraseriata Peña Cantero & Vervoort, 2010
- Acryptolaria tortugasensis Leloup, 1935
- Acryptolaria undulata Peña Cantero & Vervoort, 2010
