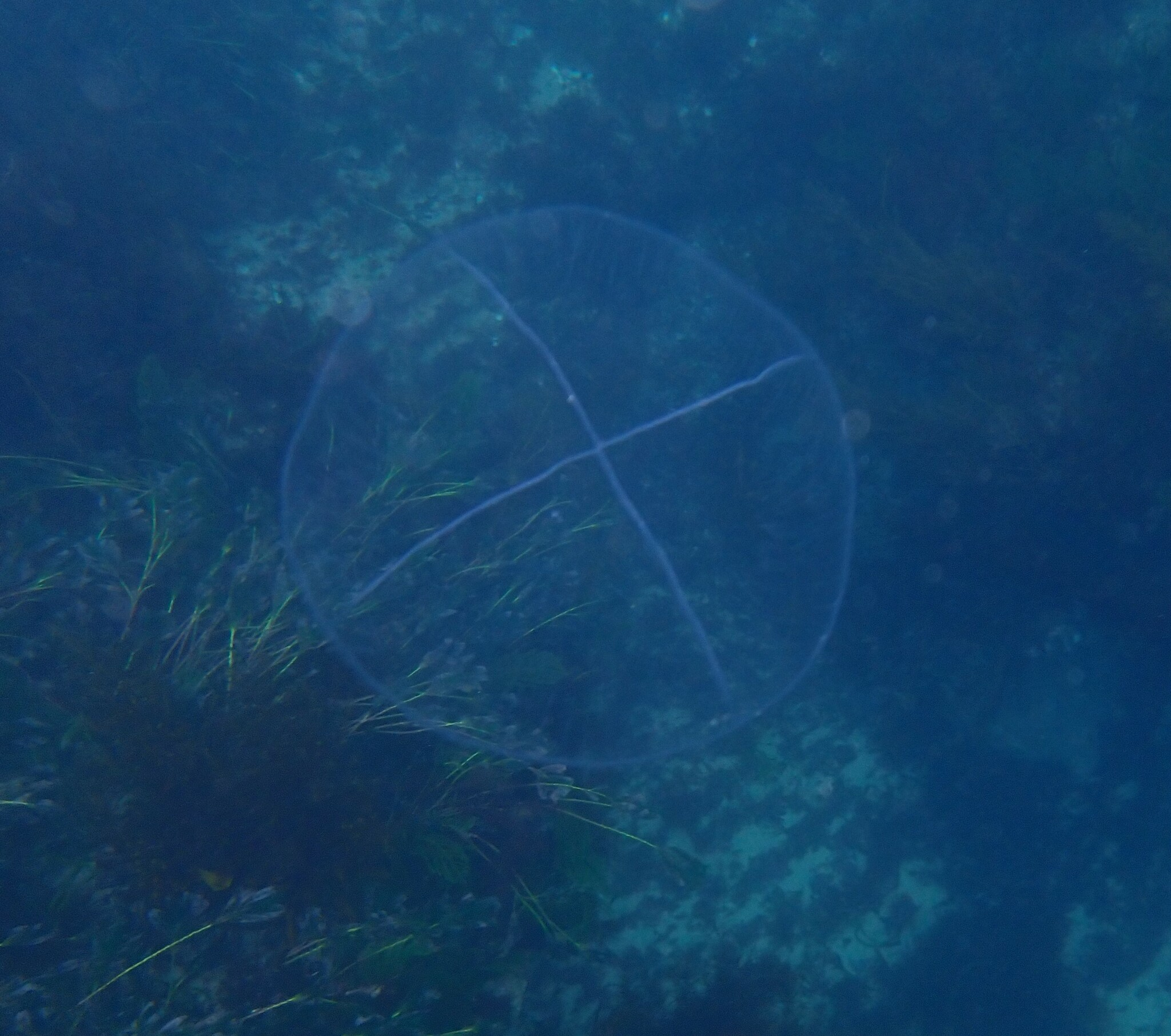
- Staurostoma falklandica

Scientific classification
- Kingdom: Animalia
- Phylum: Cnidaria
- Class: Hydrozoa
- Order: Leptothecata
- Family: Laodiceidae
- Genus: Staurostoma; Haeckel, 1879

= Staurostoma =

Genus of hydrozoans

Staurostoma is a genus of cnidarians of the family Laodiceidae. The genus contains two described species.

== Species ==
There are two currently accepted species:

- Staurostoma falklandica (Browne, 1907)
- Staurostoma mertensii (Brandt, 1835)
