= Proboscidoidea =

Scientific classification
- Kingdom: Animalia
- Phylum: Cnidaria
- Class: Hydrozoa
- Order: Leptothecata
- Suborder: Proboscidoidea; Broch, 1910

Families
- Bonneviellidae Campanulariidae Phialuciidae

Suborder of hydrozoans

Proboscidoidea is a suborder of hydrozoans in the order Leptothecata. It includes three families and near 150 distinct species. They are characterized by elongated and undercut hypostome that creates an indentation superior to the gastric cavity.
