= Cosmetira =

Scientific classification
- Kingdom: Animalia
- Phylum: Cnidaria
- Class: Hydrozoa
- Order: Leptothecata
- Family: Mitrocomidae
- Genus: Cosmetira; Forbes, 1848
- Species: C. pilosella

Binomial name
- Cosmetira pilosella Forbes, 1848

Genus of hydrozoans

Cosmetira is a monotypic genus of hydrozoans belonging to the family Mitrocomidae. The only species is Cosmetira pilosella.

The species is found in Northern Europe and Alaska.
