= Lafoeina =

Scientific classification
- Domain: Eukaryota
- Kingdom: Animalia
- Phylum: Cnidaria
- Class: Hydrozoa
- Order: Leptothecata
- Family: Campanulinidae
- Genus: Lafoeina; Sars, 1874

Genus of hydrozoans

Lafoeina is a genus of hydrozoans belonging to the family Campanulinidae.

The genus has cosmopolitan distribution.

Species:

- Lafoeina longitheca Jäderholm, 1904
- Lafoeina maxima Levinsen, 1893
- Lafoeina tenuis Sars, 1874
