= Tetrapoma =

Scientific classification
- Kingdom: Animalia
- Phylum: Cnidaria
- Class: Hydrozoa
- Order: Leptothecata
- Family: Campanulinidae
- Genus: Tetrapoma; Levinsen, 1893
- Species: T. quadridentatum

Binomial name
- Tetrapoma quadridentatum (Hincks, 1874)

Genus of Hydrozoa

Tetrapoma is a monotypic genus of hydrozoans belonging to the family Campanulinidae. The only species is Tetrapoma quadridentatum.

The species is found in America and Arctic regions.
