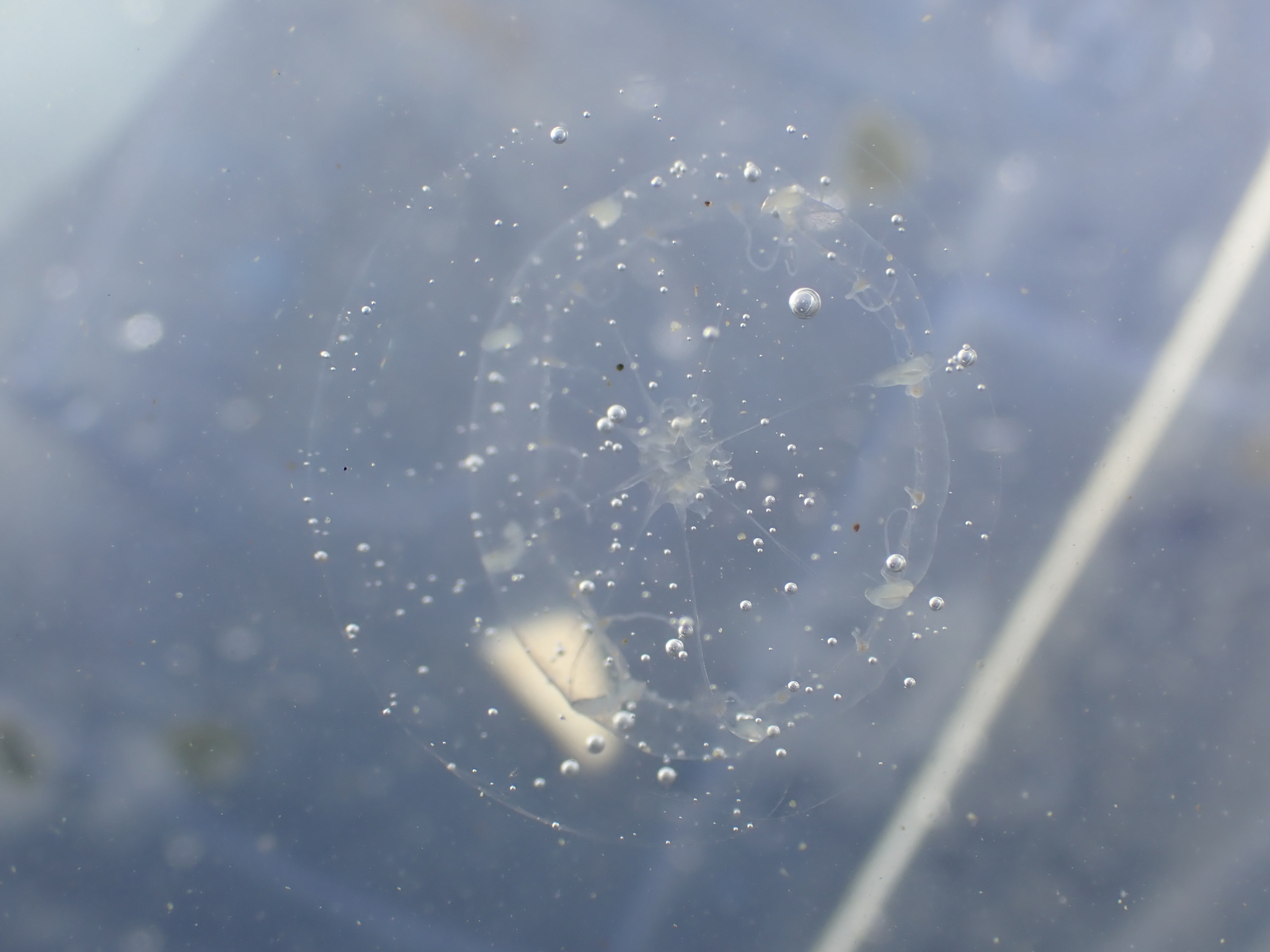
- Octophialucium indicum

Scientific classification
- Domain: Eukaryota
- Kingdom: Animalia
- Phylum: Cnidaria
- Class: Hydrozoa
- Order: Leptothecata
- Family: Malagazziidae
- Genus: Octophialucium; Kramp, 1955

Species
- see text

= Octophialucium =

Genus of cnidarians

Octophialucium is a genus of hydrozoan in the family Malagazziidae. The genus contains bioluminescent species.

== Species ==
The following species are recognized in the genus Octophialucium:

- Octophialucium aphrodite (Bigelow, 1928)
- Octophialucium bigelowi Kramp, 1955
- Octophialucium funerarium (Quoy & Gaimard, 1827)
- Octophialucium haeckeli (Vannucci & Soares Moreira, 1966)
- Octophialucium huangweiae Xu, Huang & Guo, 2007
- Octophialucium indicum Kramp, 1958
- Octophialucium irregularis Schuchert & Collins, 2021
- Octophialucium krampi Bouillon, 1984
- Octophialucium medium Kramp, 1955
- Octophialucium mollis Bouillon, 1984
- Octophialucium sinensis Huang, Xu, Guo & Qiu, 2010
- Octophialucium solidum (Menon, 1932)
