= Stegella =

Scientific classification
- Kingdom: Animalia
- Phylum: Cnidaria
- Class: Hydrozoa
- Order: Leptothecata
- Family: Campanulinidae
- Genus: Stegella; Stechow, 1919
- Species: S. lobata

Binomial name
- Stegella lobata Vanhöffen, 1910)

Genus of hydrozoans

Stegella is a monotypic genus of hydrozoans belonging to the family Campanulinidae. The only species is Stegella lobata.

The species is found in the coasts of Antarctica.
