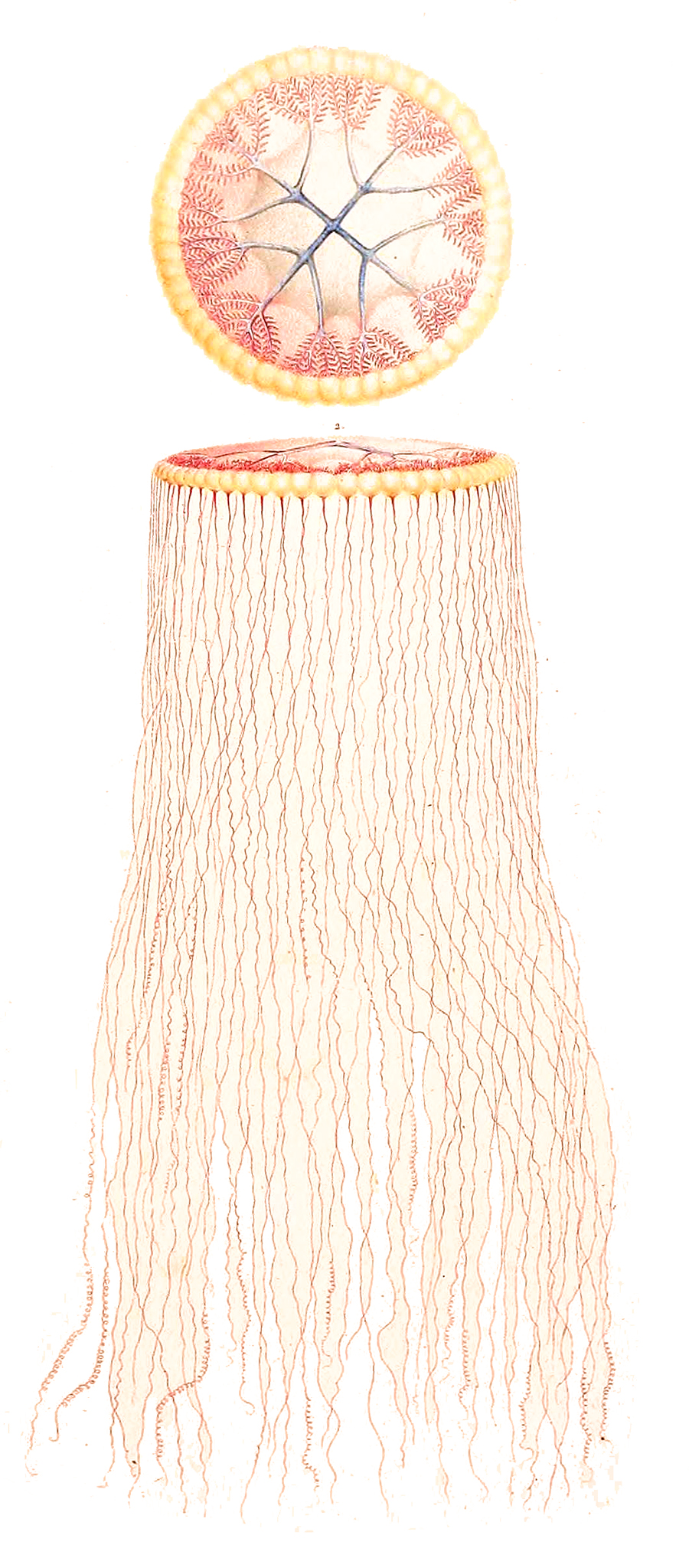
- Cuvieria carisochroma

Scientific classification
- Kingdom: Animalia
- Phylum: Cnidaria
- Class: Hydrozoa
- Order: Leptothecata
- Family: Dipleurosomatidae
- Genus: Cuvieria; Péron, 1807

= Cuvieria (cnidarian) =

Genus of hydrozoans

Cuvieria is a genus of hydrozoans belonging to the family Dipleurosomatidae.

Species:

- Cuvieria carisochroma Péron, 1807
- Cuvieria huxleyi (Haeckel, 1879)
