= Lineolaria =

Scientific classification
- Domain: Eukaryota
- Kingdom: Animalia
- Phylum: Cnidaria
- Class: Hydrozoa
- Order: Leptothecata
- Family: Lineolariidae
- Genus: Lineolaria; Hincks, 1861

Genus of hydrozoans

Lineolaria is a genus of hydrozoans belonging to the family Lineolariidae.

The species of this genus are found in Southern Australia and New Zealand.

Species:

- Lineolaria flexuosa Bale, 1884
- Lineolaria spinulosa Hincks, 1861
