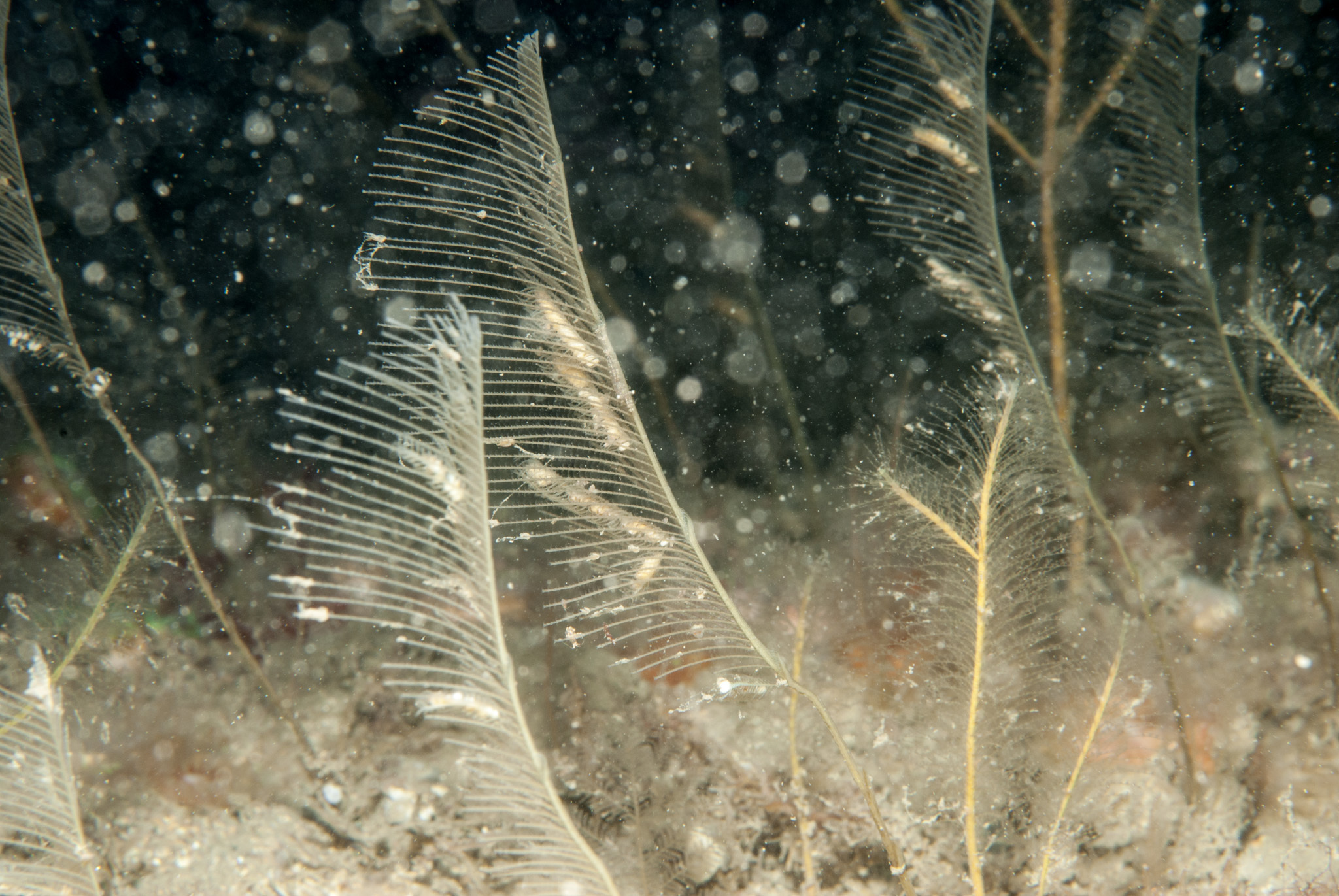
- Lytocarpia myriophyllum

Scientific classification
- Domain: Eukaryota
- Kingdom: Animalia
- Phylum: Cnidaria
- Class: Hydrozoa
- Order: Leptothecata
- Family: Aglaopheniidae
- Genus: Lytocarpia; Kirchenpauer, 1872

Synonyms
- Acanthocladium Allman, 1883; Aglaophenia (Lytocarpia) Kirchenpauer, 1872; Thecocarpus Nutting, 1900; Theocarpus Nutting, 1900

= Lytocarpia =

Genus of hydrozoans

Lytocarpia is a genus of hydrozoans belonging to the family Aglaopheniidae.

The genus has a cosmopolitan distribution.

== Species ==
The following species are recognised in the genus Lytocarpia:

- Lytocarpia acuta Stechow, 1923
- Lytocarpia alata Vervoort & Watson, 2003
- Lytocarpia angulosa (Lamarck, 1816)
- Lytocarpia annandalei (Ritchei, 1910)
- Lytocarpia armata (Bale, 1914)
- Lytocarpia bathyalis Ryland & Gibbons, 1991
- Lytocarpia benedicti (Nutting, 1900)
- Lytocarpia bispinosa (Allman, 1877)
- Lytocarpia brevirostris (Busk, 1852)
- Lytocarpia calycifera (Bale, 1914)
- Lytocarpia canepa (Blanco & Bellusci de Miralles, 1971)
- Lytocarpia chiltoni (Bale, 1924)
- Lytocarpia delicatula (Busk, 1852)
- Lytocarpia distans (Allman, 1877)
- Lytocarpia epizoica Vervoort & Watson, 2003
- Lytocarpia flexuosa (Lamouroux, 1816)
- Lytocarpia formosa (Busk, 1851)
- Lytocarpia fragilis Galea, 2020
- Lytocarpia furcata (Vervoort, 1941)
- Lytocarpia howensis (Briggs, 1918)
- Lytocarpia incisa (Coughtrey, 1875)
- Lytocarpia lepida Watson & Vervoort, 2001
- Lytocarpia megalocarpa (Bale, 1914)
- Lytocarpia myriophyllum (Linnaeus, 1758)
- Lytocarpia nicpenny Ryland & Gibbons, 1991
- Lytocarpia nigra (Nutting, 1906)
- Lytocarpia normani (Nutting, 1900)
- Lytocarpia orientalis (Billard, 1908)
- Lytocarpia parvispiralis Watson, 2019
- Lytocarpia perarmata (Billard, 1913)
- Lytocarpia phyteuma (Stechow, 1919)
- Lytocarpia pilosa Galea, 2020
- Lytocarpia pseudoctenata Galea, 2020
- Lytocarpia rigida Vervoort & Watson, 2003
- Lytocarpia similis Vervoort & Watson, 2003
- Lytocarpia spiralis (Totton, 1930)
- Lytocarpia striata Vervoort & Watson, 2003
- Lytocarpia subdichotoma (Ralph, 1961)
- Lytocarpia subtilis Galea, 2020
- Lytocarpia tenuissima (Bale, 1914)
- Lytocarpia tridentata (Versluys, 1899)
- Lytocarpia vitiensis Ryland & Gibbons, 1991
- Lytocarpia vulgaris Vervoort & Watson, 2003
