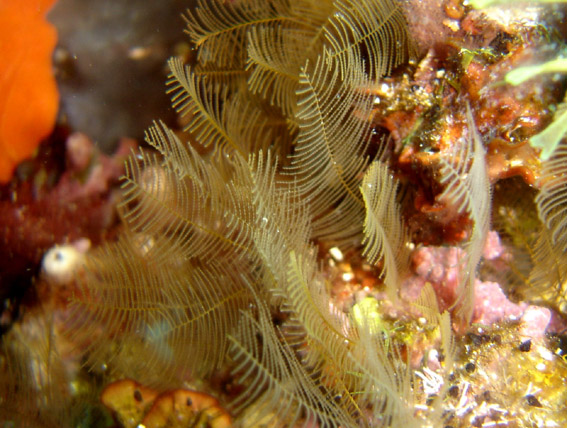
- Aglaophenia species (Aglaopheniidae)

Scientific classification
- Kingdom: Animalia
- Phylum: Cnidaria
- Class: Hydrozoa
- Order: Leptothecata
- Superfamily: Plumularioidea; McCrady, 1859

= Plumularioidea =

Superfamily of cnidarians

Plumularioidea is a superfamily of hydrozoans in the order Leptothecata.

This superfamily unites about 45 genera in the following families:

- Aglaopheniidae Marktanner-Turneretscher, 1890
- Halopterididae Millard, 1962
- Kirchenpaueriidae Stechow, 1921
- Phylactothecidae Stechow, 1921
- Plumaleciidae Choong & Calder, 2018
- Plumulariidae McCrady, 1859
- Schizotrichidae Peña Cantero, Sentandreu & Latorre, 2010

These thecate hydroids grow in erect colonies, branched in some species but unbranched in others. Each branch may bear a single or several animals. In the latter case the hydrothecae are arranged in a neat single file; in either case they are not set on stalks but grow from the branches directly. The hydrothecase have a cusped or even rim and instead of a diaphragm a well-defined floor with a hydropore that is usually off-center. The hydranths have a conical hypostome and a single whorl of thread-like tentacles. The gastrodermis contains areas with and others without digestive function. Nematophores are always present and usually protected by nematothecae. The gonotheca are borne singly or in groups, they may or may not have protective hydrocladia or appendages. The gonophores are usually fixed sporosacs, more rarely they are rather reduced medusoids.
