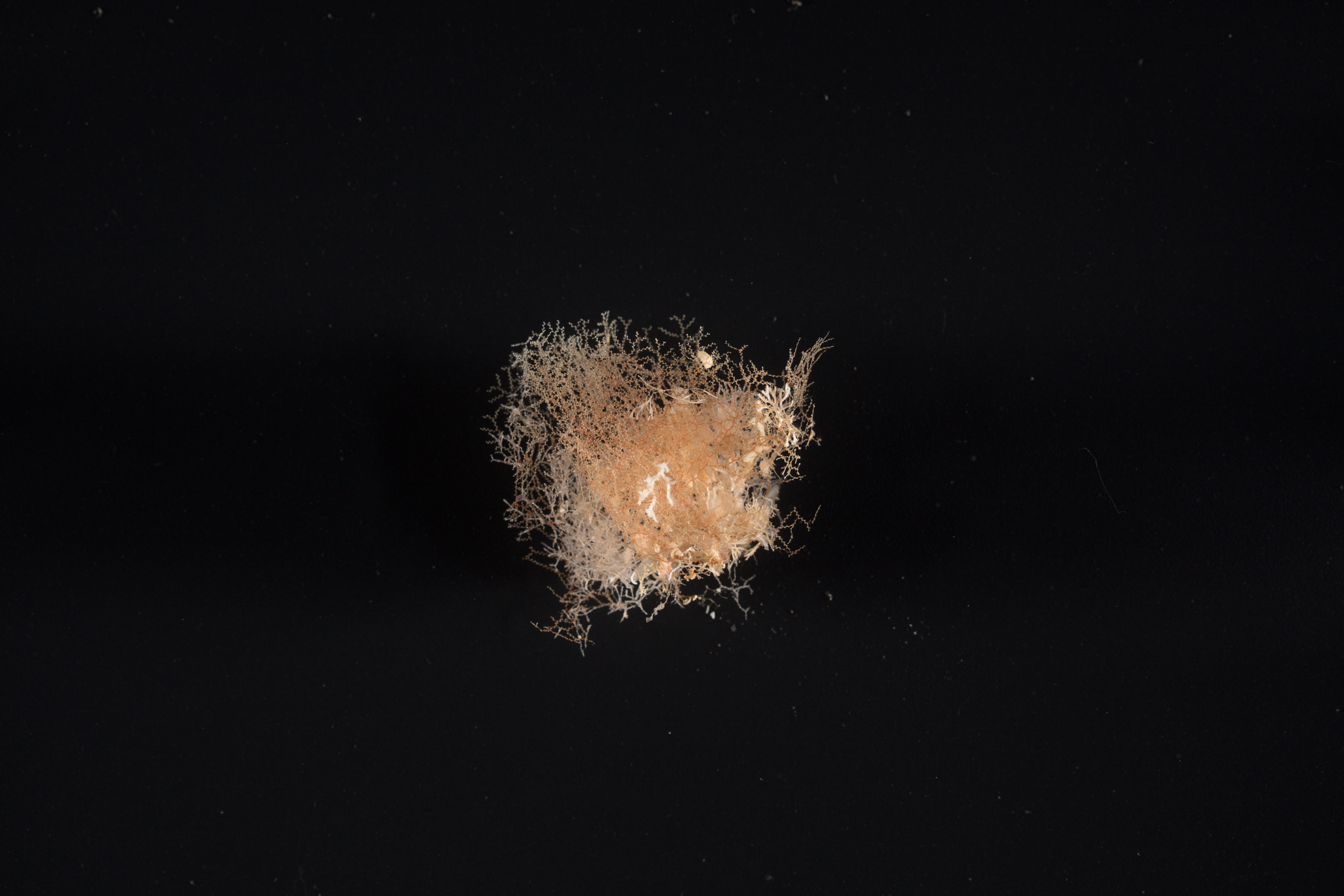

Scientific classification
- Domain: Eukaryota
- Kingdom: Animalia
- Phylum: Cnidaria
- Class: Hydrozoa
- Order: Leptothecata
- Family: Symplectoscyphidae
- Genus: Symplectoscyphus; Marktanner-Turneretscher, 1890

= Symplectoscyphus =

Genus of cnidaria

Symplectoscyphus is a genus of cnidarians. It belongs to the Symplectoscyphidae family.

== Species ==
- Symplectoscyphus adpressus
- Symplectoscyphus aggregatus
- Symplectoscyphus amoenus
- Symplectoscyphus amphoriferus
- Symplectoscyphus anae
- Symplectoscyphus arboriformis
- Symplectoscyphus bathyalis
- Symplectoscyphus bathypacificus
- Symplectoscyphus bellingshauseni
- Symplectoscyphus candelabrum
- Symplectoscyphus chubuticus
- Symplectoscyphus columnarius
- Symplectoscyphus commensalis
- Symplectoscyphus confusus
- Symplectoscyphus cumberlandicus
- Symplectoscyphus curvatus
- Symplectoscyphus densus
- Symplectoscyphus dentiferus
- Symplectoscyphus divaricatus
- Symplectoscyphus effusus
- Symplectoscyphus elegans
- Symplectoscyphus epizoicus
- Symplectoscyphus epizooticus
- Symplectoscyphus erectus
- Symplectoscyphus exochus
- Symplectoscyphus exsertus
- Symplectoscyphus fasciculatus
- Symplectoscyphus filiformis
- Symplectoscyphus flexilis
- Symplectoscyphus frigidus
- Symplectoscyphus frondosus
- Symplectoscyphus fuscus
- Symplectoscyphus glacialis
- Symplectoscyphus hero
- Symplectoscyphus hesperides
- Symplectoscyphus howensis
- Symplectoscyphus hozawai
- Symplectoscyphus hydrallmaniaeformis
- Symplectoscyphus indivisus
- Symplectoscyphus infractus
- Symplectoscyphus interruptus
- Symplectoscyphus johnstoni
- Symplectoscyphus laevis
- Symplectoscyphus leloupi
- Symplectoscyphus levinseni
- Symplectoscyphus liouvillei
- Symplectoscyphus longithecus
- Symplectoscyphus macrocarpus
- Symplectoscyphus macroscyphus
- Symplectoscyphus macrothecus
- Symplectoscyphus magellanicus
- Symplectoscyphus magnificus
- Symplectoscyphus margaritaceus
- Symplectoscyphus marionensis
- Symplectoscyphus millardi
- Symplectoscyphus milneanus
- Symplectoscyphus minutus
- Symplectoscyphus modestus
- Symplectoscyphus monopleura
- Symplectoscyphus multinodus
- Symplectoscyphus naumovi
- Symplectoscyphus neglectus
- Symplectoscyphus nesioticus
- Symplectoscyphus odontiferus
- Symplectoscyphus pallidus
- Symplectoscyphus paraglacialis
- Symplectoscyphus patagonicus
- Symplectoscyphus paucicatillus
- Symplectoscyphus paulensis
- Symplectoscyphus pedunculatus
- Symplectoscyphus pinnatus
- Symplectoscyphus pirsa
- Symplectoscyphus plectilis
- Symplectoscyphus procerus
- Symplectoscyphus pseudocolumnarius
- Symplectoscyphus pseudodivaricatus
- Symplectoscyphus pulchellus
- Symplectoscyphus pushi
- Symplectoscyphus pygmaeus
- Symplectoscyphus ralphae
- Symplectoscyphus rentoni
- Symplectoscyphus ritchiei
- Symplectoscyphus rostratus
- Symplectoscyphus rubellus
- Symplectoscyphus salvadorensis
- Symplectoscyphus secundus
- Symplectoscyphus semper
- Symplectoscyphus sibogae
- Symplectoscyphus sieboldi
- Symplectoscyphus similis
- Symplectoscyphus singularis
- Symplectoscyphus sofiae
- Symplectoscyphus spiraliformis
- Symplectoscyphus subarticulatus
- Symplectoscyphus subdichotomus
- Symplectoscyphus tricuspidatus
- Symplectoscyphus trimucronatus
- Symplectoscyphus tropicus
- Symplectoscyphus tuba
- Symplectoscyphus unilateralis
- Symplectoscyphus valdesicus
- Symplectoscyphus vanhoeffeni
- Symplectoscyphus vervoorti
- Symplectoscyphus weddelli
