= Billardia =

Scientific classification
- Domain: Eukaryota
- Kingdom: Animalia
- Phylum: Cnidaria
- Class: Hydrozoa
- Order: Leptothecata
- Family: Campanulariidae
- Genus: Billardia; Totton, 1930

Genus of hydrozoans

Billardia is a genus of cnidarians belonging to the family Lafoeidae.

The species of this genus are found in primarily in Antarctica and Australia.

Species:

- Billardia hyalina Vervoort & Watson, 2003
- Billardia intermedia Blanco, 1967
- Billardia novaezealandiae Totton, 1930
- Billardia subrufa (Jäderholm, 1904)
