= Calycella =

Calycella may refer to:

- Calycella (cnidarian), a genus of hydrozoans in the family Campanulinidae
- Calycella (fungus) (E.M. Fries) P.A. Saccardo, 1899, a genus of fungi in the family Helotiaceae
- Calycella Quélet, 1886, a genus of fungi in the family Helotiaceae, synonym of Bisporella
- Calycella, a genus of beetles in the family Mordellidae, synonym of Calycina
