= Halisiphonia =

Scientific classification
- Kingdom: Animalia
- Phylum: Cnidaria
- Class: Hydrozoa
- Order: Leptothecata
- Family: Hebellidae
- Genus: Halisiphonia; Allman, 1888

Genus of hydrozoans

Halisiphonia is a genus of deep water hydrozoans belonging to the family Hebellidae. There is little known about individual species. This lack of information has resulted from the difficulty of studying members of this genus due to the great depths at which they are located.

Species:

- Halisiphonia arctica Kramp, 1932
- Halisiphonia megalotheca Allman, 1888
- Halisiphonia nana Stechow, 1921
- Halisiphonia prolifica Peña Cantero, 2014
- Halisiphonia spongicola Haeckel, 1889

== History ==
Halisiphonia was first identified in literature in 1888 by George James Allman, after being dredged by the H.M.S. Challenger voyage that took place from 1873 to 1876. The first identified species was Halisiphonia megalotheca. It was initially characterized by Allman incorrectly as not having a diaphragm, but this was rectified upon further analysis done in 1910.

Additionally, the phylogenetic placement of this genus has been often debated, with some authors in the past classifying Hebellidae as a subfamily of the family Lafoeidae. However, after research showed that Lafoeidae and Hebellidae do not share a synapomorphy, the taxonomic placement of Halisiphonia was revised.

== Distribution ==
The different species of the genus Halisiphonia, vary significantly in distribution, having been found by researchers in numerous locations throughout the world. However, they are all deep-water species.

Halisiphonia megalotheca was found at depths exceeding 3000 meters in the Atlantic Ocean in regions between southern New England and Bermuda. It has also been found off the coasts of southern Australia, South Africa, and Oman.

Halisiphonia arctica has only been found near Greenland at depths of around 1200 meters.

Halisiphonia galatheae was found in two separate locations. It was found both in the Celebes Sea in the western Pacific Ocean at a depth of 4940 meters, and north of New Zealand at a depth of 8300 meters, suggesting a wide range in location.

Halisiphonia nana was found in the southern Atlantic near Bouvet Island and South Georgia Island at depths of around 451 meters and 180 meters respectively.

Halisiphonia prolifica was only recently discovered in 2014 off Queen Mary Coast in East Antarctica at depths of around 945 meters. It is closely related to H. antarctica in appearance, but does have distinguishing morphological characteristics.

== Description ==
Species of this deep-water genus are distinguished by a boundary that separates their stalk-like pedicel from their hydrotheca. They have a relatively imperceptible diaphragm, making them similar in appearance to colonies of hydrozoans of the genus Lafoea. Originally, members of this species were not described as having a diaphragm, but upon reexamination, a thin and membranous one was found. The long pedicels, around 11mm on average, of the species comprising Halisiphonia make them visually distinct from other members of the family Hebellidae. The gonotheca, thought to be similar in all species comprising Halisiphonia, has been better studied in H. arctica, where it is described as laterally compressed and pear-shaped. It is connected to the hydrorhiza of the organism via a smaller pedicel. Like other cnidarians, various species of Halisiphonia are described as having nematocysts, with H. prolifica having up to four different types. This is an interesting distinguishing feature from the closely related H. antarctica, which only has two different types of nematocysts.

== Life Stages and Reproduction ==
The species of the genus Halisiphonia are found in stolonal colonies. The presence of a gonotheca suggests the presence of a gonangia, which is the structure through which hydrozoans are able to asexually reproduce. The gonotheca of H. artica were found to have medusa buds, which morphologically resembled the free medusa of species of the genus Hebella, suggesting similarities between the two genera. There is not much known about the free medusa life stage of Halisiphonia.

== Diet ==
The specific details of the Halisiphonia diet are unknown, but broadly, hydrozoans in the polyp form are carnivorous and tend to feed on smaller organisms. They are known to consume zooplankton and occasionally diatoms.
