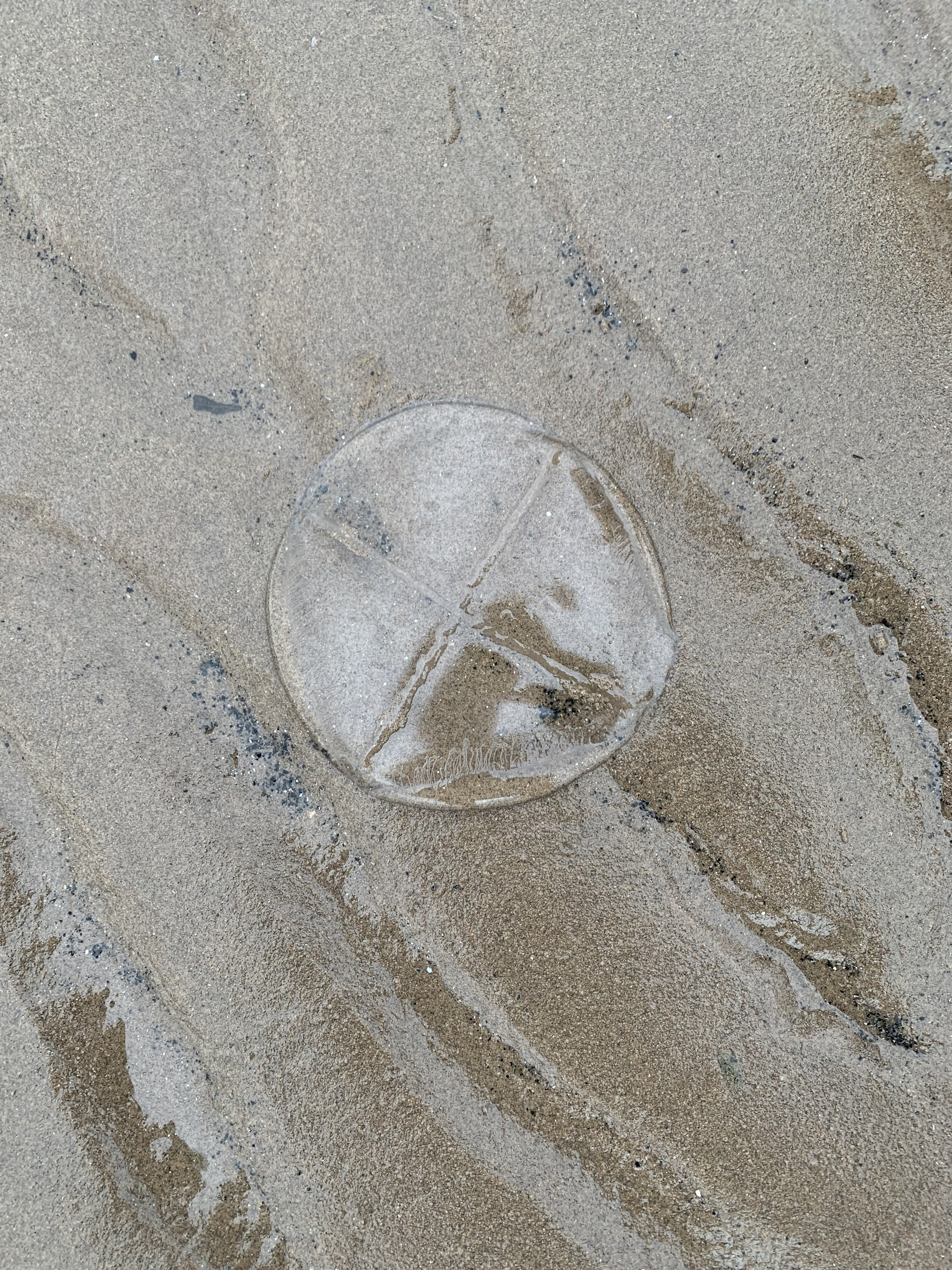
- White cross jellyfish washed up on Portobello beach, approx. 15 cm (5.9 in) in diameter.

Scientific classification
- Domain: Eukaryota
- Kingdom: Animalia
- Phylum: Cnidaria
- Class: Hydrozoa
- Order: Leptothecata
- Family: Laodiceidae
- Genus: Staurostoma
- Species: S. mertensii

Binomial name
- Staurostoma mertensii (Brandt, 1834)

= Staurostoma mertensii =

Species of cnidarian

Staurostoma mertensii, also known as the white cross jellyfish (or just sometimes the cross jellyfish), is a species of jellyfish in the genus Staurostoma. Its name derives from the distinctive cross pattern on its clear bell. It is found in the cold, shallow waters of both hemispheres.

== Description ==
The medusa of the white cross jellyfish is clear ranging from 3 to 5 cm (1.2 to 2.0 in) thick and 10 to 20 cm (3.9 to 7.9 in) wide.

Visually it is very similar to Mitrocoma cellularia, but they tend to only grow up to 10 cm (3.9 in) in diameter.

== Distribution ==
It is found in cold water neritic zone including the North Atlantic Ocean, the North Sea, the Barents Sea, White Sea, and the Sea of Okhotsk, and is found from May to early September. The ecological niche is also present in the southern hemisphere around Antarctica, and spreading to southern South America, and has been sighted in the Falklands and Chile.

== Taxonomy ==
It was first described by J. F. Brandt in 1834 under the name Staurophora mertensii, but was re-described in 1995.
