= Modeeria =

Scientific classification
- Kingdom: Animalia
- Phylum: Cnidaria
- Class: Hydrozoa
- Order: Leptothecata
- Family: Tiarannidae
- Genus: Modeeria; Forbes, 1848

Synonyms
- Tiaranna Hartlaub, 1914

Genus of aquatic creatures

Modeeria is a genus of hydrozoans belonging to the family Tiarannidae.

The genus has cosmopolitan distribution.

Species:

- Modeeria irenium Haeckel, 1879
- Modeeria rotunda (Quoy & Gaimard, 1827)
- Modeeria sagamina (Uchida, 1948)
