= Melicertum =

Scientific classification
- Kingdom: Animalia
- Phylum: Cnidaria
- Class: Hydrozoa
- Order: Leptothecata
- Family: Melicertidae
- Genus: Melicertum; Agassiz, 1862

Genus of hydrozoans

Melicertum is a genus of hydrozoans belonging to the family Melicertidae.

The species of this genus are found in Europe and Northern America.

Species:

- Melicertum campanula (Fabricius, 1780)
- Melicertum octocostatum (M. Sars, 1835)
- Melicertum ovalis Xu, Huang & Guo, 2019
