= Octocannoididae =

Scientific classification
- Kingdom: Animalia
- Phylum: Cnidaria
- Class: Hydrozoa
- Order: Leptothecata
- Family: Octocannoididae

Family of hydrozoans

Octocannoididae is a family of cnidarians belonging to the order Leptothecata.

Genera:

- Octocannoides Menon, 1932
