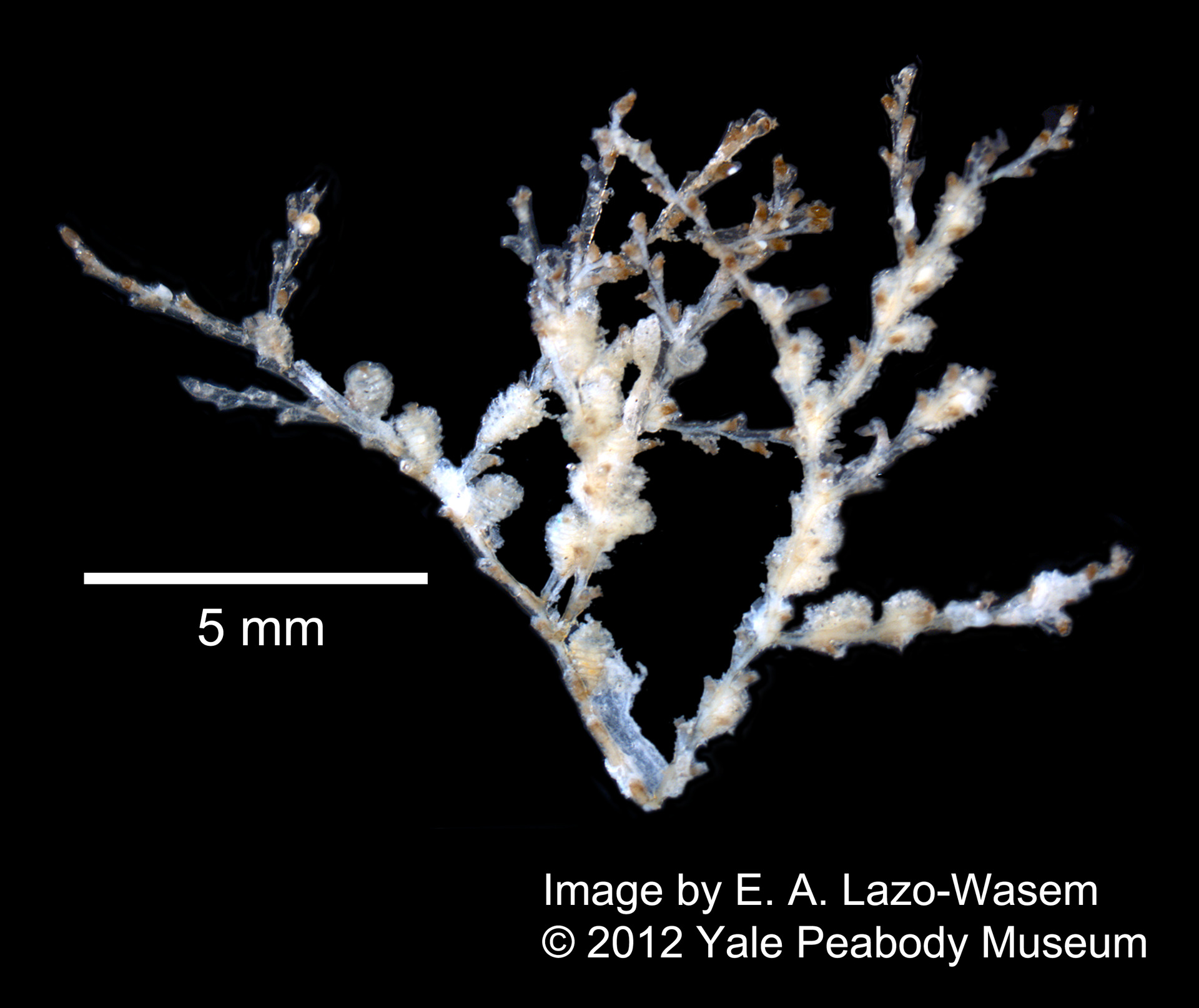

Scientific classification
- Kingdom: Animalia
- Phylum: Cnidaria
- Class: Hydrozoa
- Order: Leptothecata
- Family: Staurothecidae; Maronna et al., 2016
- Genus: Staurotheca; Allman, 1888

= Staurotheca =

Genus of hydrozoans

Staurotheca is a genus of cnidarians belonging to the monotypic family Staurothecidae.

The species of this genus are found in southernmost Southern Hemisphere.

== Species ==
Species:

- Staurotheca abyssalis Peña Cantero & Vervoort, 2003
- Staurotheca affinis (Jäderholm, 1904)
- Staurotheca amphorophora Naumov & Stepanjants, 1962
