= Cirrholoveniidae =

Scientific classification
- Kingdom: Animalia
- Phylum: Cnidaria
- Class: Hydrozoa
- Order: Leptothecata
- Family: Cirrholoveniidae
- Genus: Cirrholovenia; Kramp, 1959

Family of cnidarians

Cirrholovenia is a genus of cnidarians belonging to the family Cirrholoveniidae.

The species of this genus are found in all oceans.

Species:

- Cirrholovenia polynema Kramp, 1959
- Cirrholovenia reticulata Xu & Huang, 2004
- Cirrholovenia tetranema Kramp, 1959
- Cirrholovenia violacea Gershwin, Zeidler & Davie, 2010
