= Phrantela =

Scientific classification
- Kingdom: Animalia
- Phylum: Mollusca
- Class: Gastropoda
- Subclass: Caenogastropoda
- Order: Littorinimorpha
- Family: Hydrobiidae
- Genus: Phrantela; Iredale, 1943

Genus of freshwater snails

Phrantela is a genus of minute freshwater snails with an operculum, aquatic gastropod molluscs or micromolluscs in the family Hydrobiidae.

== Species ==
Species within the genus Phrantela include:

- Phrantela annamurrayae
- Phrantela conica
- Phrantela kutikina
- Phrantela pupiformis
- Phrantela richardsoni
- Phrantela umbilicata
