= Plumalecium =

Scientific classification
- Kingdom: Animalia
- Phylum: Cnidaria
- Class: Hydrozoa
- Order: Leptothecata
- Superfamily: Plumularioidea
- Family: Plumaleciidae; Choong & Calder, 2018
- Genus: Plumalecium; Antsulevich, 1982
- Species: P. plumularioides

Binomial name
- Plumalecium plumularioides (Clark, 1877)

Genus of cnidarians

Plumalecium is a monotypic genus of cnidarians belonging to the monotypic family Plumaleciidae. The only species is Plumalecium plumularioides.

The species is found in Northern America.
