= Bonneviellidae =

Scientific classification
- Kingdom: Animalia
- Phylum: Cnidaria
- Class: Hydrozoa
- Order: Leptothecata
- Suborder: Proboscidoidea
- Family: Bonneviellidae

Family of hydrozoans

Bonneviellidae is a family of cnidarians belonging to the order Leptomedusae. The family consists of only one genus: Bonneviella Broch, 1909. It was named for Norwegian zoologist Kristine Bonnevie by then-doctoral student Hjalmar Broth in 1910.
