= Sugiuridae =

Scientific classification
- Kingdom: Animalia
- Phylum: Cnidaria
- Class: Hydrozoa
- Order: Leptothecata
- Family: Sugiuridae; Bouillon, 1984

Family of hydrozoans

Sugiuridae is a family of hydrozoans belonging to the order Leptothecata.

Genera:

- Multioralis Mayer, 1900
- Sugiura Bouillon, 1984
