= Phrantela annamurrayae =

Conservation status
- Vulnerable (IUCN 2.3)

Scientific classification
- Kingdom: Animalia
- Phylum: Mollusca
- Class: Gastropoda
- Subclass: Caenogastropoda
- Order: Littorinimorpha
- Family: Hydrobiidae
- Genus: Phrantela
- Species: P. annamurrayae

Binomial name
- Phrantela annamurrayae Ponder & G. A. Clark, 1993

Species of gastropod

Phrantela annamurrayae is a species of small freshwater snail with an operculum, an aquatic gastropod mollusc or micromollusc in the family Hydrobiidae. This species is endemic to Australia.
