= Calycella (cnidarian) =

Scientific classification
- Kingdom: Animalia
- Phylum: Cnidaria
- Class: Hydrozoa
- Order: Leptothecata
- Family: Campanulinidae
- Genus: Calycella; Allman, 1864

Genus of hydrozoans

Calycella is a genus of hydrozoans belonging to the family Campanulinidae.

Species:

- Calycella gracilis Hartlaub, 1897
- Calycella syringa (Linnaeus, 1767)
