= Symplectoscyphidae =

Scientific classification
- Kingdom: Animalia
- Phylum: Cnidaria
- Class: Hydrozoa
- Order: Leptothecata
- Family: Symplectoscyphidae; Maronna, Miranda, Peña Cantero, Barbeitos & Marques, 2016

Family of hydrozoans

Symplectoscyphidae is a family of cnidarians in the order Leptothecata.

== Genera ==
- Antarctoscyphus Peña Cantero, Garcia Carrascosa & Vervoort, 1997
- Symplectoscyphus Marktanner-Turneretscher, 1890
