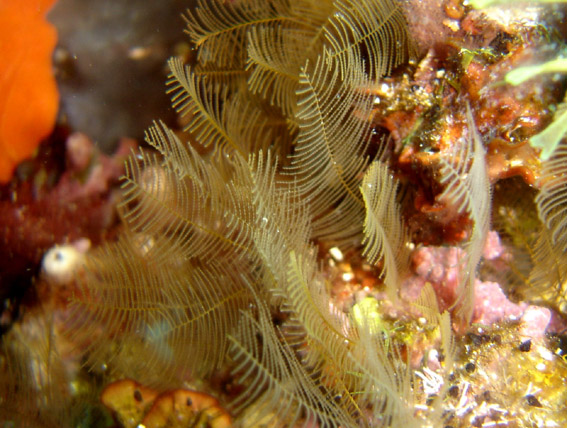
- Aglaophenia species (Aglaopheniidae)

Scientific classification
- Kingdom: Animalia
- Phylum: Cnidaria
- Class: Hydrozoa
- Order: Leptothecata
- Superfamily: Plumularioidea
- Family: Aglaopheniidae; Marktanner-Turneretscher, 1890

Genera
- see text

= Aglaopheniidae =

Family of hydrozoans

Aglaopheniidae is a family of hydrozoans.

== Genera ==
According to the World Register of Marine Species, these genera belong to this family:

- Aglaophenia Lamouroux, 1812
- Aglaophenopsis Fewkes, 1881
- Carpocladus Vervoort & Watson, 2003
- Cladocarpoides Bogle, 1984
- Cladocarpus Allman, 1874
- Gymnangium Hincks, 1874
- Lytocarpia Kirchenpauer, 1872
- Macrorhynchia Kirchenpauer, 1872
- Monoserius Marktanner-Turneretscher, 1890
- Nematocarpus Broch, 1918
- Streptocaulus Allman, 1883
- Taxella Allman, 1874
- Wanglaophenia Vervoort & Watson, 2003
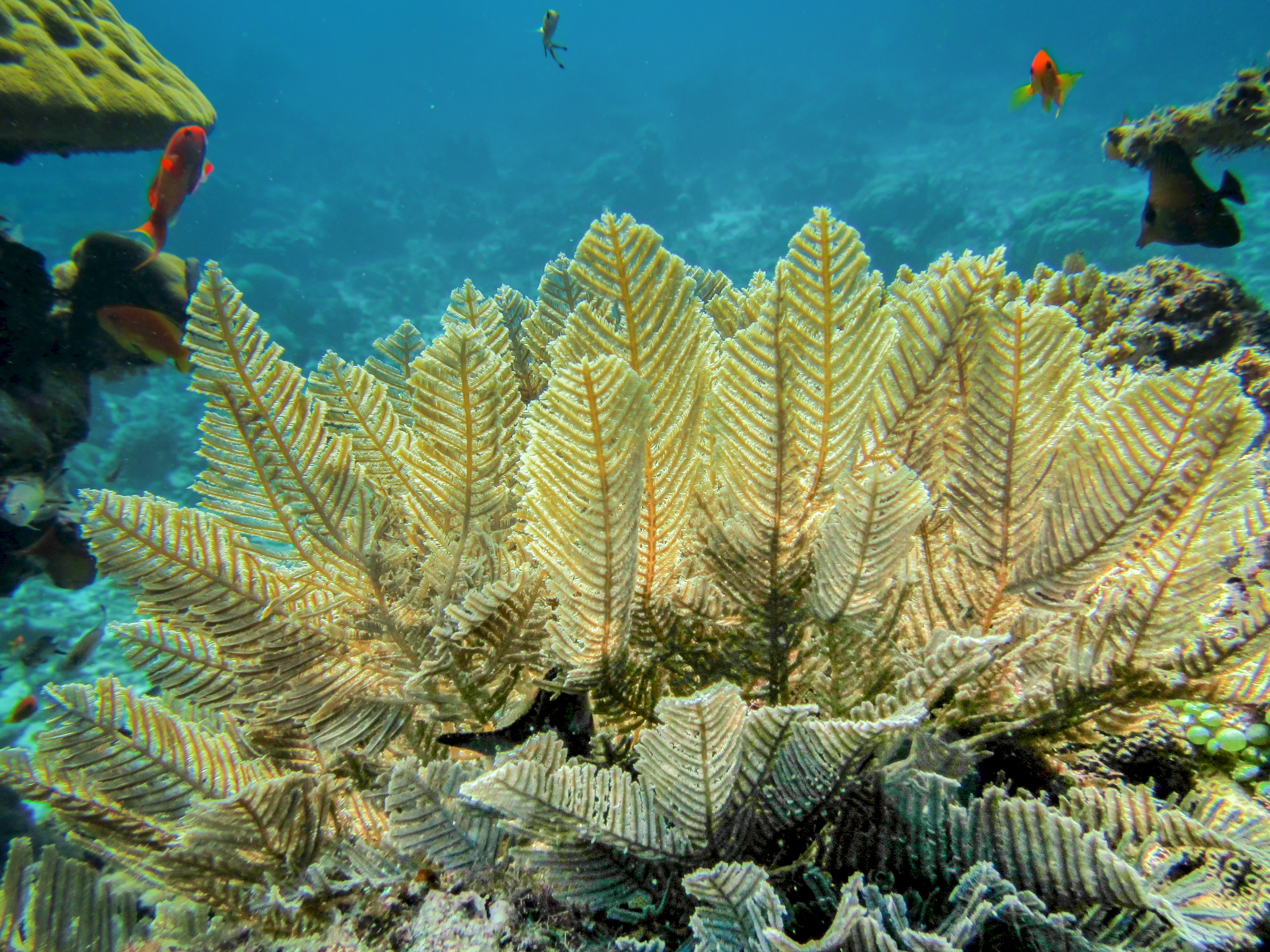
Aglaophenia cupressina

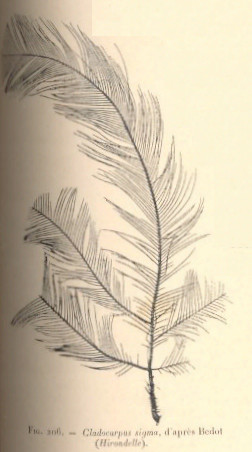
Cladocarpus sigma

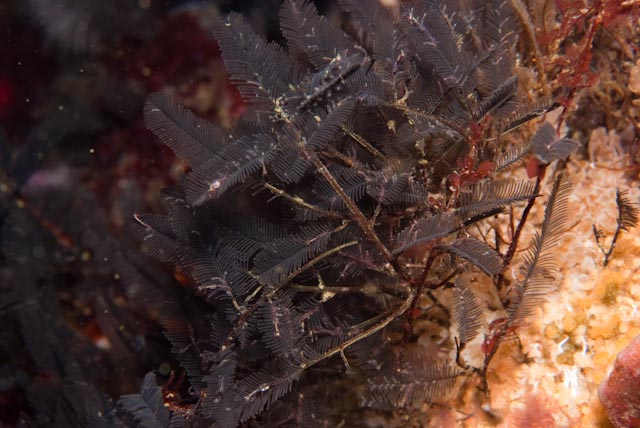
Macrorhynchia filamentosa
