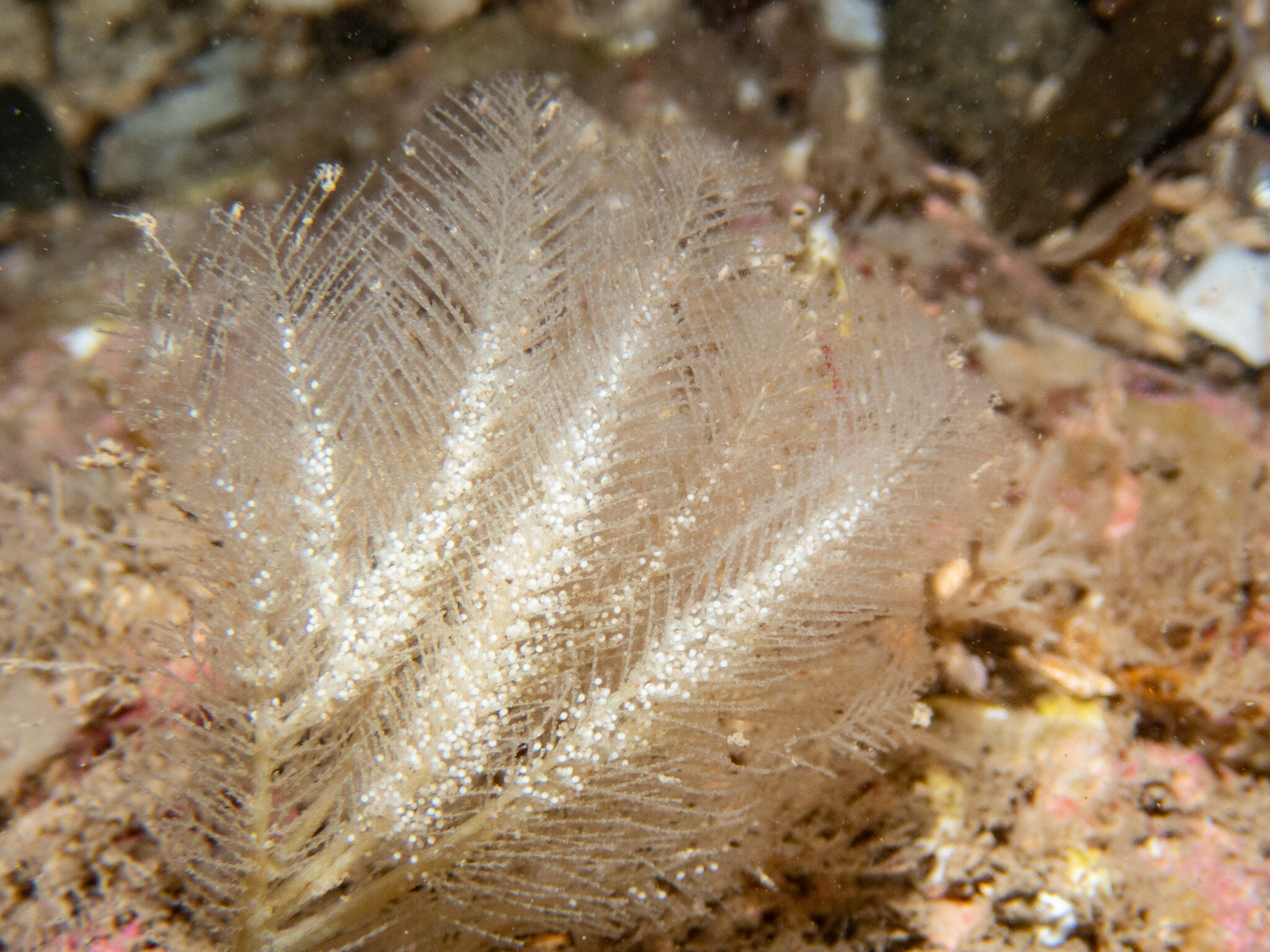
- Schizotricha frutescens

Scientific classification
- Kingdom: Animalia
- Phylum: Cnidaria
- Class: Hydrozoa
- Order: Leptothecata
- Family: Schizotrichidae; Peña Cantero, Sentandreu & Latorre, 2010
- Genus: Schizotricha; Allman, 1883

= Schizotricha =

Genus of hydrozoans

Schizotricha is a genus of cnidarians belonging to the monotypic family Schizotrichidae.

The genus has an almost cosmopolitan distribution.

== Species ==
The following species are recognised in the genus Schizotricha:

- Schizotricha anderssoni Jäderholm, 1904
- Schizotricha auroraaustralis Peña Cantero & Fresneda Marzal, 2018
- Schizotricha crassa Peña Cantero & Vervoort, 2004
- Schizotricha dichotoma Nutting, 1900
- Schizotricha discovery Soto Angel & Peña Cantero, 2015
- Schizotricha falcata Peña Cantero, 1998
- Schizotricha frigida Pena Cantero, 2023
- Schizotricha frutescens (Ellis & Solander, 1786)
- Schizotricha glacialis (Hickson & Gravely, 1907)
- Schizotricha heteromera Peña Cantero & Vervoort, 2005
- Schizotricha jaederholmi Peña Cantero & Vervoort, 1996
- Schizotricha longinema Schuchert, 2015
- Schizotricha multifurcata Allman, 1883
- Schizotricha nana Peña Cantero, Svoboda & Vervoort, 1996
- Schizotricha pacificola Naumov, 1960
- Schizotricha parvula Nutting, 1900
- Schizotricha philippina Hargitt, 1924
- Schizotricha polaris Naumov, 1960
- Schizotricha profunda (Nutting, 1900)
- Schizotricha southgeorgiae Peña Cantero & Vervoort, 2004
- Schizotricha trinematotheca Peña Cantero & Vervoort, 2005
- Schizotricha turqueti Billard, 1906
- Schizotricha unifurcata Allman, 1883
- Schizotricha vervoorti Peña Cantero, 1998
