= Teclaiidae =

Scientific classification
- Kingdom: Animalia
- Phylum: Cnidaria
- Class: Hydrozoa
- Order: Leptothecata
- Family: Teclaiidae; Bouillon et al., 2000

Family of hydrozoans

Teclaiidae is a family of hydrozoans belonging to the order Leptothecata.

Genera:

- Parateclaia Bouillon, Pagès, Gili, Palanques, Puig & Heussner, 2000
- Teclaia Gili, Bouillon, Pages, Palanques & Puig, 1999
