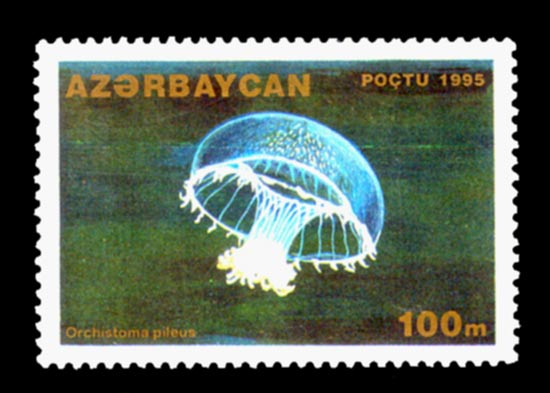

Scientific classification
- Kingdom: Animalia
- Phylum: Cnidaria
- Class: Hydrozoa
- Order: Leptothecata
- Family: Orchistomatidae; Bouillon, 1984
- Genus: Orchistoma; Haeckel, 1879

Synonyms
- (Family): Orchistomidae Bouillon, 1984; (Genus): Tetracannota Mayer, 1900

= Orchistoma =

Genus of hydrozoans

Orchistoma is a genus of hydrozoans in the order Leptothecata. It is the only genus in the monotypic family Orchistomatidae.

The species of this genus are found in Europe, North America and Australia.

Species:

- Orchistoma agariciforme Keller, 1884
- Orchistoma collapsum (Mayer, 1900)
- Orchistoma manam Bouillon, 1984
- Orchistoma mauropoda Gershwin, Zeidler & Davie, 2010
- Orchistoma nubiae Bouillon, 1984
- Orchistoma pileus (Lesson, 1843)
