= Barcino foixensis =

Scientific classification
- Kingdom: Animalia
- Phylum: Cnidaria
- Class: Hydrozoa
- Order: Leptothecata
- Family: Barcinidae; Gili, Bouillon, Pagès, Palanques & Puig, 1999
- Genus: Barcino; Gili, Bouillon, Pagès, Palanques & Puig, 1999
- Species: B. foixensis

Binomial name
- Barcino foixensis Gili, Bouillon, Pages, Palanques & Puig, 1999

Family of hydrozoans

Barcino foixensis is a species of hydrozoan in the order Leptothecata. It is the only species in the monotypic genus Barcino and the family Barcinidae.
