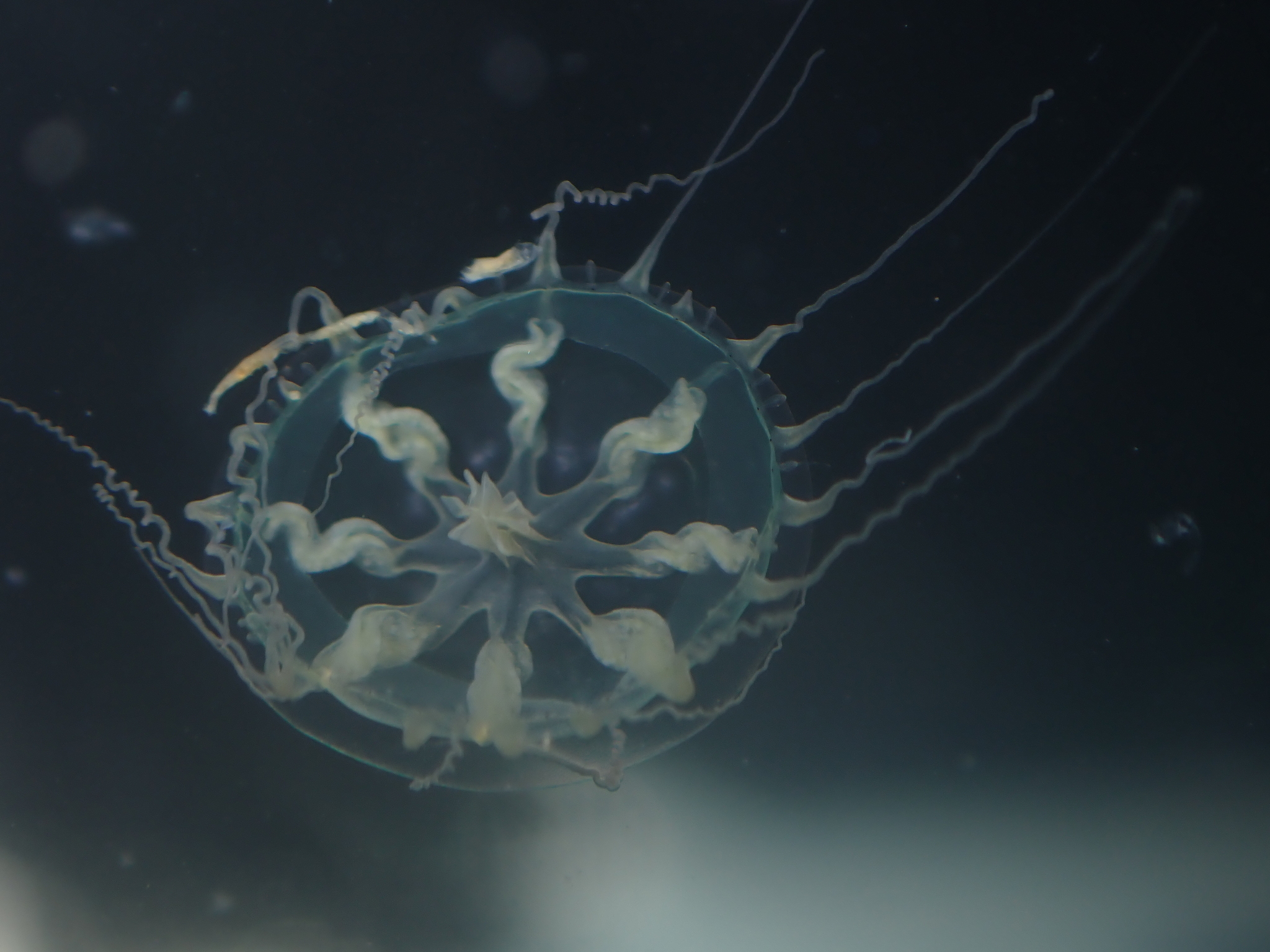
- Melicertissa orientalis

Scientific classification
- Kingdom: Animalia
- Phylum: Cnidaria
- Class: Hydrozoa
- Order: Leptothecata
- Family: Hebellidae; Fraser, 1912

= Hebellidae =

Family of hydrozoans

Hebellidae is a family of hydrozoans in the order Leptothecata.

== Genera ==
The following genera are recognized within the family Hebellidae:

- Anthohebella Boero, Bouillon & Kubota, 1997
- Bedotella Stechow, 1913
- Halisiphonia Allman, 1888
- Hebella Allman, 1888
- Melicertissa Haeckel, 1879
- Scandia Fraser, 1912
- Staurodiscus Haeckel, 1879
