= Tiaropsidae =

Scientific classification
- Kingdom: Animalia
- Phylum: Cnidaria
- Class: Hydrozoa
- Order: Leptothecata
- Family: Tiaropsidae; Boero, Bouillon & Danovaro, 1987

Family of hydrozoans

Tiaropsidae is a family of hydrozoans belonging to the order Leptothecata.

Genera:

- Octogonade Zoja, 1896
- Tiaropsidium Torrey, 1909
- Tiaropsis Agassiz, 1849
