= Hydrodendron =

Scientific classification
- Kingdom: Animalia
- Phylum: Cnidaria
- Class: Hydrozoa
- Order: Leptothecata
- Family: Phylactothecidae
- Genus: Hydrodendron; Hincks, 1874

Synonyms
- Phylactotheca Stechow, 1913

Genus of hydrozoans

Hydrodendron is a genus of cnidarians belonging to the monotypic family Phylactothecidae.

The species of this genus is found in all oceans.

== Species ==
Species:

- Hydrodendron alternatum (Fraser, 1938)
- Hydrodendron arboreum (Allman, 1888)
