= Lineolariidae =

Scientific classification
- Kingdom: Animalia
- Phylum: Cnidaria
- Class: Hydrozoa
- Order: Leptothecata
- Superfamily: Campanulinoidea
- Family: Lineolariidae

Family of hydrozoans

Lineolariidae is a family of cnidarians belonging to the order Leptomedusae.

Genera:

- Agglutinaria Antsulevich, 1987
- Lineolaria Hincks, 1861
- Nicoliana Watson, 1992
