= Campanulinidae =

Scientific classification
- Kingdom: Animalia
- Phylum: Cnidaria
- Class: Hydrozoa
- Order: Leptothecata
- Superfamily: Campanulinoidea
- Family: Campanulinidae

Family of hydrozoans

Campanulinidae is a family of cnidarians belonging to the order Leptomedusae.

== Genera ==
Genera:

- Calycella Hincks in Allman, 1864
- Campanulina van Beneden, 1847
- Egmundella Stechow, 1921
- Gangiostoma Xu, 1983
- Lafoeina Sars, 1874
- Opercularella Hincks, 1868
- Oplorhiza Allman, 1877
- Plicatotheca Calder & Vervoort, 1986
- Racemoramus Calder, 2012
- Stegella Stechow, 1919
- Tetrapoma Levinsen, 1893
- Tripoma Hirohito, 1995
