= Syntheciidae =

Scientific classification
- Kingdom: Animalia
- Phylum: Cnidaria
- Class: Hydrozoa
- Order: Leptothecata
- Family: Syntheciidae; Marktanner-Turneretscher, 1890

Family of hydrozoans

Syntheciidae is a family of hydrozoans belonging to the order Leptothecata.

== Genera ==
The following genera are recognised in the family Syntheciidae:

- Hincksella Billiard, 1918
- Synthecium Allman, 1872
