= Dipleurosomatidae =

Scientific classification
- Kingdom: Animalia
- Phylum: Cnidaria
- Class: Hydrozoa
- Order: Leptothecata
- Family: Dipleurosomatidae; Boeck, 1868

Synonyms
- Berenicidae Eschscholtz, 1829; Cannotidae Haeckel, 1879; Dipleurosomidae Boeck, 1866

Family of hydrozoans

Dipleurosomatidae is a family of hydrozoans belonging to the order Leptothecata.

Genera:

- Cannota Haeckel, 1879
- Cuvieria Péron, 1807
- Dichotomia Brooks, 1903
- Dipleurosoma Boeck, 1868
- Spectacularia Gershwin, 2005
