= Blackfordiidae =

Scientific classification
- Kingdom: Animalia
- Phylum: Cnidaria
- Class: Hydrozoa
- Order: Leptothecata
- Superfamily: Campanulinoidea
- Family: Blackfordiidae

Family of hydrozoans

Blackfordiidae is a family of cnidarians belonging to the order Leptothecata. The family consists of only one genus: Blackfordia Mayer, 1910.

The genus Blackfordia is characterized by having four radial canals, gonads completely surrounding the radial canals, and having hollow marginal tentacles in which the endodermal cores of the tentacles extend inwards from the bell margin into the gelatinous substance of the bell Mayer, 1910.
