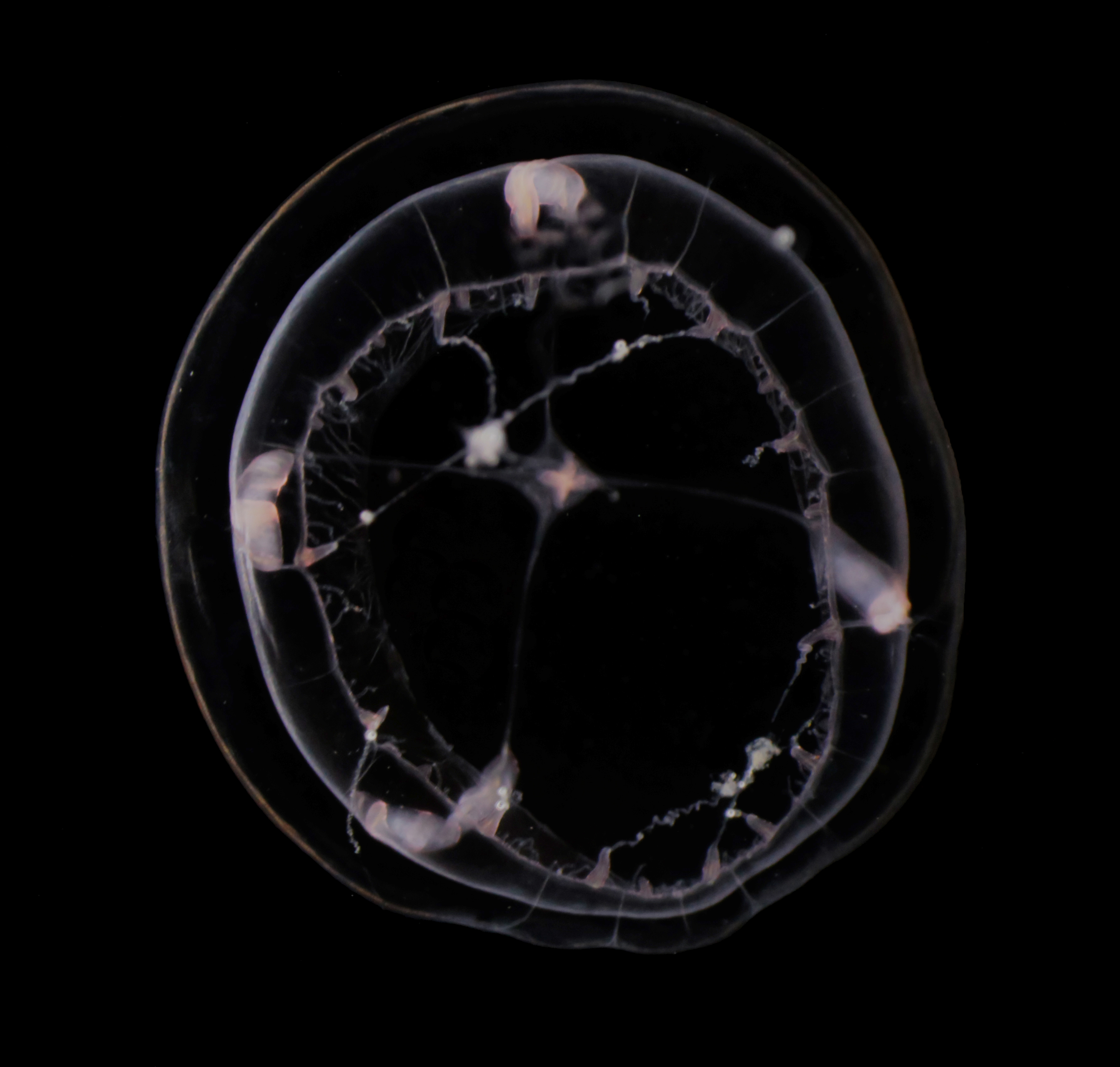
- Mitrocomella polydiademata

Scientific classification
- Kingdom: Animalia
- Phylum: Cnidaria
- Class: Hydrozoa
- Order: Leptothecata
- Family: Mitrocomidae; Haeckel, 1879

Genera
- Cosmetira Forbes, 1848; Cosmetirella Browne, 1910; Cyclocanna Bigelow, 1918; Earleria Collins, Ross, Genzano & Mianzan, 2006; Halopsis Agassiz, 1865; Mitrocoma Haeckel, 1864; Mitrocomella Haeckel, 1879

= Mitrocomidae =

Family of marine invertebrates

Mitrocomidae is a family of hydrozoans in the order Leptothecata.
