= Phialucium =

Scientific classification
- Domain: Eukaryota
- Kingdom: Animalia
- Phylum: Cnidaria
- Class: Hydrozoa
- Order: Leptothecata
- Family: Phialuciidae; Kramp, 1955
- Genus: Phialucium; Maas, 1905

Genus of hydrozoans

Phialucium is a genus of cnidarians belonging to the monotypic family Phialuciidae.

The species of this genus are found in India Ocean, Malesia, Australia.

Species:

- Phialucium carolinae (Mayer, 1900)
- Phialucium condensum Kramp, 1953
- Phialucium mbenga (Agassiz & Mayer, 1899)
- Phialucium multitentaculatum Menon, 1932
