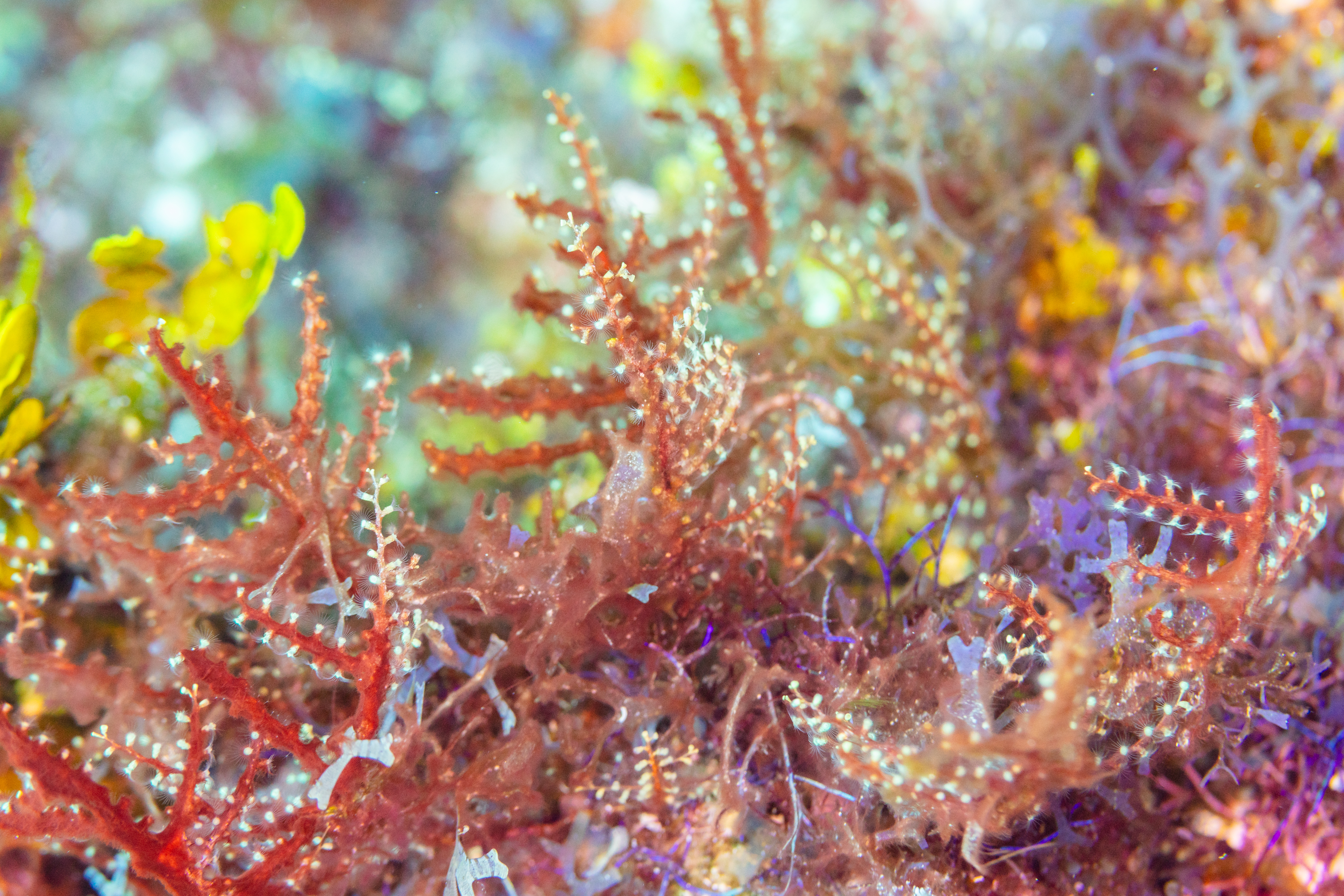
- Thyroscyphus ramosus

Scientific classification
- Kingdom: Animalia
- Phylum: Cnidaria
- Class: Hydrozoa
- Order: Leptothecata
- Superfamily: Sertularioidea
- Family: Thyroscyphidae

= Thyroscyphidae =

Family of hydrozoans

Thyroscyphidae is a family of cnidarians belonging to the order Leptothecata.

Genera:

- Parascyphus Ritchie, 1911
- Sertularelloides Leloup, 1937
- Symmetroscyphus Calder, 1986
- Thyroscyphoides Naumov, 1955
- Thyroscyphus Allman, 1877
- Tuberocaulus Galea, 2019
- Uniscyphus Millard, 1977
