= Sugiura =

Sugiura (written: 杉浦) is a Japanese surname. Notable people with the surname include:

- Akiyoshi Sugiura (杉浦 昭嘉), Japanese film director
- Asami Sugiura (杉浦 亜紗美, born 1985), Japanese model, actress and AV idol
- Hinako Sugiura (杉浦 日向子, 1958–2005), Japanese manga artist
- Hisui Sugiura (杉浦 非水, 1876–1965), Japanese graphic designer
- Kaju Sugiura (杉浦 嘉十, 1896–1945), Imperial Japanese Navy admiral
- Kanematsu Sugiura (杉浦兼松, 1890–1979), Japanese-American cancer researcher
- Keiko Sugiura (杉浦 佳子, born 1970), Japanese para-cyclist
- Kunié Sugiura (杉浦 邦恵, born 1942), Japanese photographer
- Kyohei Sugiura (杉浦 恭平, born 1989), Japanese footballer
- Masanori Sugiura (杉浦 正則, born 1968), Japanese baseball player
- Naoki Sugiura (杉浦 直樹, 1931–2011), Japanese actor
- Seiken Sugiura (杉浦 正健, born 1934), Japanese politician
- Shigeo Sugiura (杉浦 重雄, 1917–1988), Japanese swimmer
- Shigeru Sugiura (杉浦 茂, 1908–2000), Japanese manga artist
- Shiho Sugiura (杉浦 志保), Japanese manga artist
- Tadashi Sugiura (杉浦 忠, 1935–2001), Japanese baseball player
- Taiyo Sugiura (杉浦 太陽, born 1981), Japanese actor
- Takashi Sugiura (杉浦 貴, born 1970), Japanese professional wrestler
- Yusei Sugiura (杉浦 佑成, born 1995), Japanese basketball player

== Fictional characters ==
- Ayano Sugiura (杉浦 綾乃), a character in the manga series YuruYuri
- Midori Sugiura (杉浦 碧), a character in the anime series Mai-HiME
