= Malagazziidae =

Scientific classification
- Kingdom: Animalia
- Phylum: Cnidaria
- Class: Hydrozoa
- Order: Leptothecata
- Family: Malagazziidae; Haeckel, 1879

Family of hydrozoans

Malagazziidae is a family of hydrozoans.

== Genera ==
The following genera are recognized within the family Malagazziidae:

- Octocanna Haeckel, 1879 (nomen dubium)
- Octophialucium Kramp, 1955
- Malagazzia Bouillon, 1984
- Tetracanna Goy, 1979
