= Clathrozoidae =

Scientific classification
- Kingdom: Animalia
- Phylum: Cnidaria
- Class: Hydrozoa
- Order: Leptothecata
- Family: Clathrozoidae; Stechow, 1921

Synonyms
- Clathrozoinae Stechow, 1921; Clathrozonidae Hirohito, 1967; Hydrocerathinidae Spencer, 1891

Family of hydrozoans

Clathrozoidae is a family of hydrozoans belonging to the order Leptothecata.

== Genera ==
The following genera are recognised in the family Clathrozoidae:

- Clathrozoon Spencer, 1891
- Pseudoclathrozoon Hirohito, 1967
