= Lafoeidae =

Scientific classification
- Kingdom: Animalia
- Phylum: Cnidaria
- Class: Hydrozoa
- Order: Leptothecata
- Family: Lafoeidae; Hincks, 1868

Family of hydrozoans

Lafoeidae is a family of hydrozoans.

== Genera ==
The following genera are recognized within the family Lafoeidae:

- Acryptolaria Norman, 1875
- Billardia Totton, 1930
- Cryptolarella Stechow, 1913
- Filellum Hincks, 1868
- Grammaria Stimpson, 1853
- Lafoea Lamouroux, 1821
