= Tiarannidae =

Scientific classification
- Kingdom: Animalia
- Phylum: Cnidaria
- Class: Hydrozoa
- Order: Leptothecata
- Family: Tiarannidae; Russell, 1940

Family of hydrozoans

Tiarannidae is a family of hydrozoans belonging to the order Leptothecata.

Genera:

- Chromatonema Fewkes, 1882
- Krampella Russell, 1957
- Margalefia Pagès, Bouillon & Gili, 1991
- Modeeria Forbes, 1848
- Stegolaria Stechow, 1913
- Stegopoma Levinsen, 1893
- Tiaranna Haeckel, 1879
