= Melicertidae =

Scientific classification
- Kingdom: Animalia
- Phylum: Cnidaria
- Class: Hydrozoa
- Order: Leptothecata
- Family: Melicertidae; Agassiz, 1862

Family of cnidarians

Melicertidae is a family of hydrozoans belonging to the order Leptothecata.

== Genera ==
The following genera are recognised in the family Melicertidae:

- Melicertoides Kramp, 1959
- Melicertum Oken, 1815
- Netocertoides Mayer, 1900
