= Laodiceidae =

Scientific classification
- Kingdom: Animalia
- Phylum: Cnidaria
- Class: Hydrozoa
- Order: Leptothecata
- Family: Laodiceidae

Family of hydrozoans

Laodiceidae is a family of cnidarians belonging to the order Leptomedusae.

== Genera ==
The following genera are recognised in the family Laodiceidae:

- Guillea Bouillon, Pagès, Gili, Palanques, Puig & Heussner, 2000
- Laodicea Lesson, 1843
- Ptychogena Agassiz, 1865
- Staurostoma Haeckel, 1879
