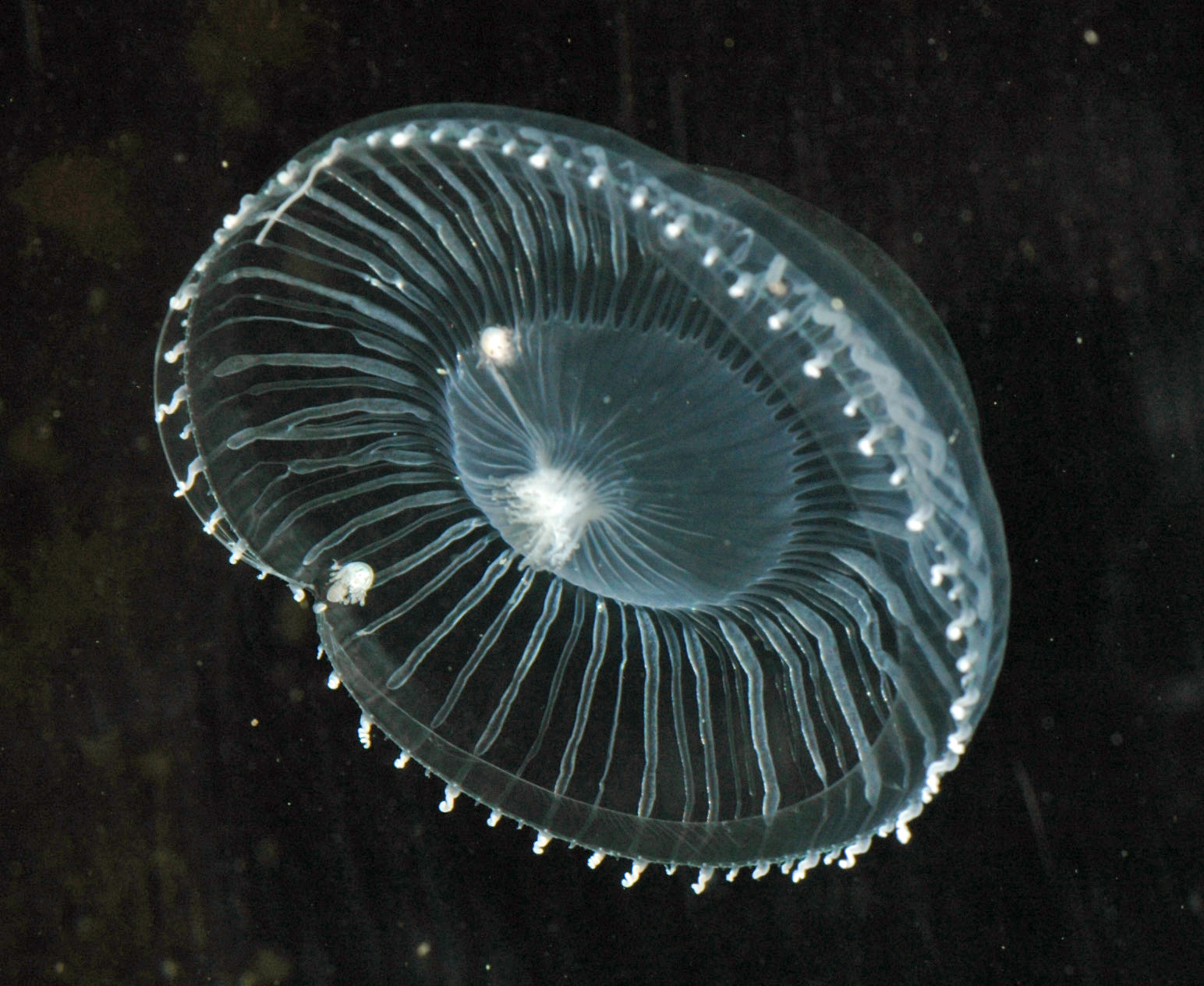
- Crystal Jelly (Aequorea victoria, Conica: Aequoreidae) with the parasitic amphipod Hyperia medusarum

Scientific classification
- Kingdom: Animalia
- Phylum: Cnidaria
- Class: Hydrozoa
- Subclass: Hydroidolina
- Order: Leptothecata; Cornelius, 1992

Synonyms
- Leptomedusa Haeckel, 1879; Leptomedusae Haeckel, 1879; Leptothecatae Cornelius, 1992; Thecaphora Hincks, 1868; Thecaphorae Hincks, 1868; Thecata Fleming, 1828; Thecatae Fleming, 1828

= Leptothecata =

Thecate hydroids

Order of cnidarians with hydrothecae

Leptothecata, or thecate hydroids, are an order of hydrozoans in the phylum Cnidaria. Their closest living relatives are the athecate hydroids, which are similar enough to have always been considered closely related, and the very apomorphic Siphonophorae, which were placed outside the "Hydroida". Given that there are no firm rules for synonymy for high-ranked taxa, alternative names like Leptomedusa, Thecaphora or Thecata, with or without the ending emended to "-ae", are also often used for Leptothecata.

In the sessile stage, Leptothecata are surrounded by a chitinous outer layer as their exoskeleton, including the gonophores, their reproductive organ. Leptothecata exhibit radial symmetry, and their gonads can be found in the radial canals of the medusa stage. Their habits range from benthic to planktonic. The polyps and colonial forms are benthic, whilst the medusae are planktonic. Leptothecata exhibit extensive, complex variation. Thecata colonies also have extensive specialization due to their polyps' function and variation. Most Leptothecata possess statocysts, which are used for defence and protection. The classes that have lost their statocysts have been changed ancestrally over time rather than a direct loss.

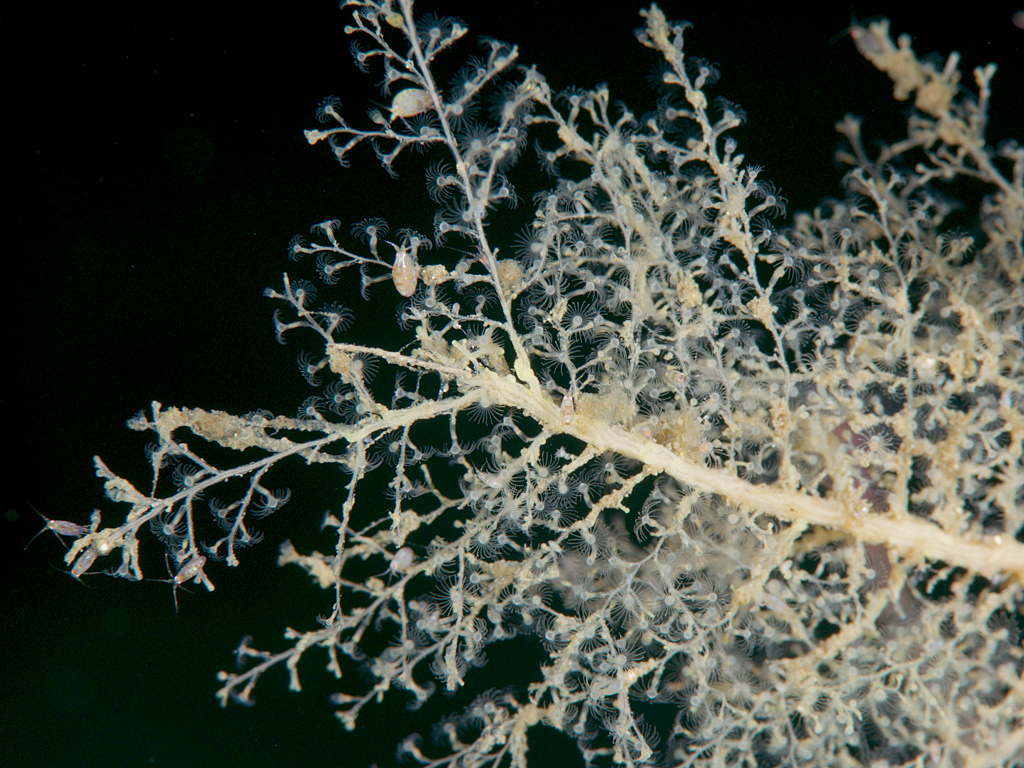
The hydroid Halecium muricatum, Gulen Dive Resort, Norway

The approximately 1,900 species of Leptothecata are characterized by a number of features: Their polyps are always living in colonies with the hydranths set in hydrotheca which are usually permanent and often long enough so the animal can fully retract into it; some have very reduced hydrothecae resembling Anthoathecata. There is a single whorl of tentacles.

The gonophores are borne on much reduced hydranths and usually protected in a peridermal gonotheca. Medusae forming on fully developed hydranths are extremely rare; usually the gonophores develop into medusae or into sessile sporosacs. The medusae have a shallow bell, bear the gonads on their radial canals, and usually have statocysts which are formed only from epidermal tissue and more than four tentacles and. The cnidome never has stenoteles.

== Characteristics ==
Colony architecture among Leptothecata comprises extensive diversity found in the hydrozoans. Their life cycles have been found to be connected with changes in colony shapes. Zooid polymorphism within the colonies are usually specialized. Polyps that make up the colonies tend to have three specialities and functions. First being the gastrozooid, which has their speciality of nutrition and digesting the food. Second, the gonozooid which is the reproductive polyp. Third, being the dactylozooid which function works in defense for the colony. The dactylozooid recently had become more highly variable with not being present in some thecata colony forms, and only possessing the gastrozooid and gonozooid polyps.

Thecata colonies have detectable shapes and arrangements allowing for distinguishing classification between one another. One major shape is when the colonies are erected off a branched colony. Another major shape of thecata is where the colonies can be erected off an unbranched stem. Stolonal colonies are a final major type where their polyps are connected to the creeping part of the colony. Where most cases of the erected branched shape have been found to be derived over time.

Medusae tend to be pelagic. But there are specific medusae species while at the medusa stage can still remain benthic. Polyps can also be free floating, which are called pelagic polyps. Similarly, their gastroular and nervous system have great complexity, as well as their shape. While medusae due tend to lack any presence of visible sense organs. Leptothecata have significant synapomorphies that are present in most of all their species. In regards to their gastrozooids, Lephtothecata have the theca layer on their polyps. Which has allowed the synapomorphy for Leptothecata to form hydrothecae that is also made of theca, that surrounds the gonozooid.

== Reproduction and development ==
Leptothecata have distinguishing factors in the presence of morphological dimorphism. The dimorphism in the species classes has led to great complexity within their taxonomic identification. Majority of the thecate hydroids use asexual reproduction in response to budding. They have also been known for their plasticity, allowing them to adapt and grow in their given environment. Thecata's branch has a mutual similarity based on mature gamete localization, where they possess their mature gametes located through their radial canals.

== Distribution ==
Among Leptothecata's diversified species, they have great variability within their organization and life cycles. Leptothecata can be found worldwide in all marine environments. The location of where Leptothecata are found ranges from shallow waters to the deep sea, most being marine species. In their polyp and medusa form, due to natural factors they can travel outside their native location. This is usually done by currents or if attached to other vertebrates. Due to the hydroids' broad range of locations, they also have been known to play in many ecosystem factors. They provide shelter and protection and are a known food source for other marine species. Leptothecata has been the main attraction in many great expeditions and studies due to the broad spectrum of thecate hydroids within their order. These developments have led to further discoveries of finding locations where thecate hydroids can be relatively rich in the marine environment. Allowing researchers to study a range of differences based on the colonies, the hydrotheca and even the pairs of thecae themselves.

== Notable species of Leptothecata ==
- Air fern (Sertularia argentea), sold dried as novelty "plants" and aquarium ornaments
- Crystal jelly (Aequorea victoria), a bioluminescent hydrozoan
- Sea fur (Obelia spp.), a common coastal polyp and medusa

== Taxonomy and systematics ==
The thecate hydroids were formerly placed in the paraphyletic "Hydroida" as the suborder Leptomedusa. Currently, the following families are classified within the order Leptothecata:

- Basal and incertae sedis
  - Leptothecata
- Family
  - Family Aequoreidae
  - Family Barcinidae
  - Family Blackfordiidae
  - Family Bonneviellidae
  - Family Campanulariidae
  - Family Campanulinidae
  - Family Cirrholoveniidae
  - Family Clathrozoidae
  - Family Dipleurosomatidae
  - Family Eirenidae
  - Family Haleciidae
  - Family Hebellidae
  - Family Lafoeidae
  - Family Laodiceidae
  - Family Lineolariidae
  - Family Lovenellidae
  - Family Malagazziidae
  - Family Melicertidae
  - Family Mitrocomidae
  - Family Octocannoididae
  - Family Orchistomatidae
  - Family †Palaequoreidae
  - Family Phialellidae
  - Family Phialuciidae
  - Family Staurothecidae
  - Family Sugiuridae
  - Family Symplectoscyphidae
  - Family Syntheciidae
  - Family Teclaiidae
  - Family Tiarannidae
  - Family Tiaropsidae
  - Family Zygophylacidae
- Superfamily Plumularioidea
  - Family Aglaopheniidae
  - Family Halopterididae
  - Family Kirchenpaueriidae
  - Family Phylactothecidae
  - Family Plumaleciidae
  - Family Plumulariidae
  - Family Schizotrichidae
- Superfamily Sertularioidea
  - Family Sertularellidae
  - Family Sertulariidae
  - Family Thyroscyphidae
