= A. sibogae =

A. sibogae may refer to:

- Acanthephyra sibogae, a species of shrimp in the genus Acanthephyra
- Acanthochitona sibogae, a species of chiton in the genus Acanthochitona
- Acanthogorgia sibogae, a species of coral in the genus Acanthogorgia
- Acetes sibogae, a species of shrimp in the genus Acetes
- Aglaophenia sibogae, a species of hydroid in the genus Aglaophenia
- Amage sibogae, a species of polychate worm in the order Canalipalpata
- Ammotrypane sibogae, a species of polychaete worm in the family Opheliidae
- Ameira sibogae, a species of copepod in the genus Ameira
- Anacepon sibogae, a species of isopod
- Aniculus sibogae, a species of hermit crab in the genus Aniculus
- Anthenea sibogae, a species of seastar in the genus Anthenea
- Antennella sibogae, a species of hydroid in the genus Antennella
- Antipathes sibogae, a species of coral in the genus Antipathes
- Aphrodita sibogae, a species of polychaete worm in the genus Aphrodita
- Apristurus sibogae, a species of shark
- Arachnactis sibogae, a species of anemone in the family Arachnactidae
- Atopocrinus sibogae, a species of crinoid in the order Comatulida
- Atorella sibogae, a species of jellyfish
