= Bathygyge =

Scientific classification
- Kingdom: Animalia
- Phylum: Arthropoda
- Clade: Pancrustacea
- Class: Malacostraca
- Order: Isopoda
- Family: Bopyridae
- Subfamily: Bathygyginae; Markham, 2016
- Genus: Bathygyge; Hansen, 1897
- Species: B. grandis

Binomial name
- Bathygyge grandis Hansen, 1897

Monotypic genus of isopods

Bathygyge grandis is a species of ectoparasitic epicaridean isopod crustacean in the family Bopyridae. It is the only species in the genus Bathygyge and the subfamily Bathygyginae.

== Description and ecology ==
Multiple traits set Bathygyge grandis apart from other bopyrids. The pleon of adult females is highly torsioned, flexioned over the pereon ant pointing anteriorly. The coxal plates of pereon segments 1 and 2 are also extended over the dorsal surface of the pereon, and the second pair of oostegites extend well in front of the head. The males have unusual retractable claw-like dactyli that fit into sockets. Less unusual features include females having extremely ovate bodies, tiny pereopods and no frontal shelf on the head, while males are elongate with extremely simplified pleons, lacking segmentation or appendages.

Bathygyge grandis is a branchial ectoparasite on decapods in the genus Glyphocrangon (family Glyphocrangonidae).
