= Allodiplophryxus floridanus =

Scientific classification
- Kingdom: Animalia
- Phylum: Arthropoda
- Class: Malacostraca
- Order: Isopoda
- Family: Bopyridae
- Genus: Allodiplophryxus
- Species: A. floridanus

Binomial name
- Allodiplophryxus floridanus Markham, 1985

Species of crustacean

Allodiplophryxus floridanu is an isopoda parasite present in the waters of the Gulf of Mexico.

== Description ==
Allodiplophryxus floridanus is an Epicaridean isopoda parasite that is found on the gill chamber of Urocaris longicaudata and Periclimenes magnus. The species exhibit sexual dimorphism, the females can grow up to 2.32mm long whereas the males grow to 0.62mm long. It inhabits marine environments.

== Distribution ==
Allodiplophryxus floridanus is a native species to the Gulf of Mexico. It has been observed along the Florida west coast and the coast of Colombia.
