= Leidya bimini =

Scientific classification
- Kingdom: Animalia
- Phylum: Arthropoda
- Class: Malacostraca
- Order: Isopoda
- Family: Bopyridae
- Genus: Leidya
- Species: L. bimini

Binomial name
- Leidya bimini Pearse, 1951

Species of crustacean

Leidya bimini is an isopoda parasite present in the Gulf of Mexico. First described in 1951 by Pearse.

== Description ==
Leidya bimini is a species known to parasitize Pachygrapsus transversus and Armases cinereum, crab species. It attaches itself to the branchial chamber of the host. In 2002, researchers conducted an examination of the grapsoid crab A. cinereum. The study found that 3.7% of A. cinereum, in the Tampa Bay area, were infected with L. bimini. Like most Bopyrids the species experiences sexual dimorphism, the female being larger than the male individuals. L. bimini has measured up to 4.5-5.3 mm long for females and 1.9-2.5 mm long for the males.
