= Gigantione =

Scientific classification
- Kingdom: Animalia
- Phylum: Arthropoda
- Class: Malacostraca
- Order: Isopoda
- Family: Bopyridae
- Subfamily: Pseudioninae
- Genus: Gigantione; Kossmann, 1881

Species
- See text

Genus of crustaceans

Gigantione is a genus of isopod crustaceans, in the family Bopyridae. Members of this genus are parasitic to other crustaceans like Eiconaxius, Atergatis floridus, Carpilius convexus, and other species.

== Species ==
- Gigantione bouvieri Bonnier, 1900
- Gigantione elconaxii Markham, 1994
- Gigantione giardi Nobili, 1906
- Gigantione hainanensis An, H. Yu & Markham, 2009
- Gigantione hawaiiensis Danforth, 1967
- Gigantione ishigakiensis Shiino, 1941
- Gigantione moebii Kossmann, 1881
- Gigantione mortenseni Adkison, 1984
- Gigantione notonyxae An, Williams & Jiang, 2016
- Gigantione petalomerae Markham, 1999
- Gigantione pikei Page, 1985
- Gigantione pratti Danforth, 1967
- Gigantione rathbunae Stebbing, 1910
- Gigantione rhombos An, H. Yu & Markham, 2009
- Gigantione sagamiensis Shiino, 1958
- Gigantione tau An, H. Yu & Markham, 2009
- Gigantione tuberculata An, Williams & Jiang, 2016
- Gigantione uberlackerae Adkison, 1984
