= Albunione yoda =

Scientific classification
- Kingdom: Animalia
- Phylum: Arthropoda
- Class: Malacostraca
- Order: Isopoda
- Family: Bopyridae
- Genus: Albunione
- Species: A. yoda

Binomial name
- Albunione yoda Markham & Boyko, 2003

Species of crustacean

Albunione yoda is a marine isopod assigned to the family Bopyridae, which is known to occur near Taiwan. It is an ectoparasite that resides in the gills of its host, the mole crab Albunea groeningi. A. yoda was named after a character of the Star Wars saga, Jedi Master Yoda, because with the slightly curved long lateral extensions of the head of the female, it looks like the head of Yoda with his long drooping ears.
