= Acrobelione langi =

Scientific classification
- Kingdom: Animalia
- Phylum: Arthropoda
- Class: Malacostraca
- Order: Isopoda
- Family: Bopyridae
- Genus: Acrobelione
- Species: A. langi

Binomial name
- Acrobelione langi (Van Name, 1920)

Species of crustacean

Acrobelione langi is a species of isopod in the genus Acrobelione.
