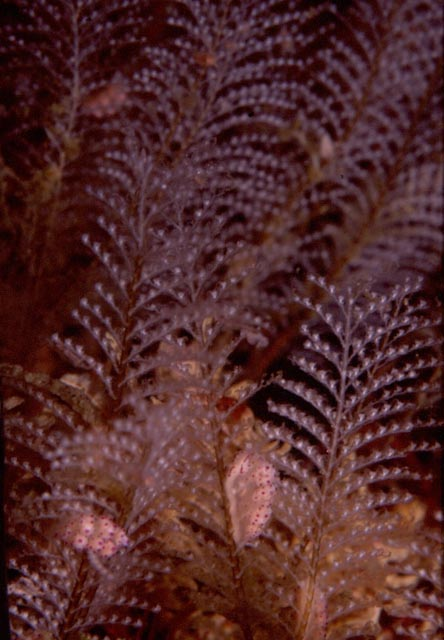
- Snowdrop hydroid with Doto coronata

Scientific classification
- Kingdom: Animalia
- Phylum: Cnidaria
- Class: Hydrozoa
- Order: Leptothecata
- Family: Halopterididae
- Genus: Gattya
- Species: G. humilis

Binomial name
- Gattya humilis Allman, 1885

Synonyms
- Paragattya humilis (Allman, 1885); Paragattya intermedia Warren, 1908

= Gattya humilis =

Species of cnidarian

Gattya humilis, the snowdrop hydroid, is a delicate colonial hydroid in the family Halopterididae.

== Description ==
Snowdrop hydroids are usually white and have small branches extending from a central stem. They may grow up to 3 cm in total height. The male gonophores (reproductive bodies) are smaller and more rounded than the female ones, which are goblet-shaped and contain only one egg each. Both sexes occur on the same stem.

== Distribution ==
This colonial animal is found off the southern African coast from Northern Namibia to KwaZulu-Natal from the subtidal to 70m under water. It is only found in this region.

== Ecology ==
This species often grows on coralline algae or weed.
