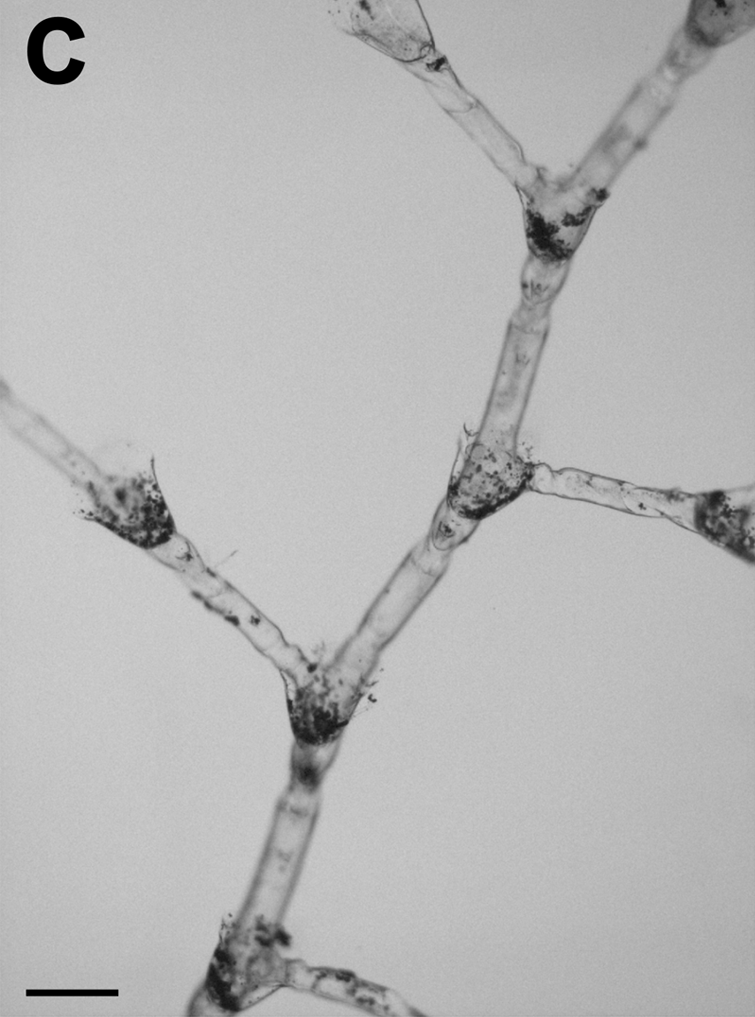

Scientific classification
- Kingdom: Animalia
- Phylum: Cnidaria
- Class: Hydrozoa
- Order: Leptothecata
- Family: Halopterididae
- Genus: Halopteris
- Species: H. diaphana

Binomial name
- Halopteris diaphana Heller, 1868

Synonyms
- Anisocalix diaphana Heller, 1868; Plumularia alternata Nutting, 1900

= Halopteris diaphana =

Species of Hydrozoa

Halopteris diaphana is a species of hydroida first described in 1868 as Anisocalix diaphana by Camill Heller.
