= Acrobelione anisopoda =

Scientific classification
- Kingdom: Animalia
- Phylum: Arthropoda
- Class: Malacostraca
- Order: Isopoda
- Family: Bopyridae
- Genus: Acrobelione
- Species: A. anisopoda

Binomial name
- Acrobelione anisopoda Bourdon, 1981

Species of crustacean

Acrobelione anisopoda is a species of crustacean isopod in the Bopyridae family. It is found on the island of Príncipe. The species was first described in 1981 by R. Bourdon.
