= Dark-finger coral crab =

Dark-finger coral crab may refer to:

- Atergatis subdentatus (de Haan, 1835), also known as the red reef crab
- Carpilius maculatus (Linnaeus, 1758), also known as the seven-eleven crab and spotted reef crab
