= Leidya ucae =

Scientific classification
- Kingdom: Animalia
- Phylum: Arthropoda
- Class: Malacostraca
- Order: Isopoda
- Family: Bopyridae
- Genus: Leidya
- Species: L. ucae

Binomial name
- Leidya ucae Pearse, 1930

Species of crustacean

Leidya ucae is an isopoda parasite present in the waters off the coast of China. First described in 1930 by Pearse.

== Etymology ==
The species name "ucae" is in reference to the type of crab it infects, the species used to be in the genus Uca.

== Description ==
Leidya infelix is a species known to parasitize Tubuca forcipata, a species of fiddler crab.
