= Acrobelione halimedae =

Scientific classification
- Kingdom: Animalia
- Phylum: Arthropoda
- Clade: Pancrustacea
- Class: Malacostraca
- Order: Isopoda
- Family: Bopyridae
- Genus: Acrobelione
- Species: A. halimedae

Binomial name
- Acrobelione halimedae (Boyko, Williams & Shields, 2017)

Species of crustacean

Acrobelione halimedae is an isopoda parasite present in the waters off Singapore. First described in 2017, by Boyko, Williams & Shields.

== Description ==
Acrobelione halimedae is isopoda ectoparasite that infects the branchial chamber of the mud shrimp Austinogebia spinfrons of the coast of Singapore. The females measure up to 8.0 mm long, with a maximal width of 6.4 mm, head width 1.9 mm, and head length 1.5 mm. Currently there is no description of the male of the species.
