= Albunione australiana =

Scientific classification
- Kingdom: Animalia
- Phylum: Arthropoda
- Clade: Pancrustacea
- Class: Malacostraca
- Order: Isopoda
- Family: Bopyridae
- Genus: Albunione
- Species: A. australiana

Binomial name
- Albunione australiana Markham & Boyko, 1999

Species of crustacean

Albunione australiana is a species of marine parasitic isopod that belongs to the family Bopyridae, which is known to occur on the coast of Queensland Australia. Albunea microps, a species of burrowing sand crabs, is a known host of A. australiana.

== Description ==
Like most species of Bopyridae, A. australiana experiences sexual dimorphism with the females being significantly larger than the males. Females have been measured at 9.6 mm in length, compared to males at 4.1 mm in length. Females have no eyes present, whereas males have dark eyes that are oddly shaped.
