= Cancricepon elegans =

Scientific classification
- Kingdom: Animalia
- Phylum: Arthropoda
- Class: Malacostraca
- Order: Isopoda
- Family: Bopyridae
- Genus: Cancricepon
- Species: C. elegans

Binomial name
- Cancricepon elegans Giard & Bonnier, 1887

Synonyms
- Cepon elegans Giard & Bonnier, 1886 (nomen nudum)

Species of crustacean

Cancricepon elegans is a species of isopod that parasitises the crab Pilumnus hirtellus. It was originally described from French waters and has since been found off the coast of Great Britain.
