= Leidya infelix =

Scientific classification
- Kingdom: Animalia
- Phylum: Arthropoda
- Class: Malacostraca
- Order: Isopoda
- Family: Bopyridae
- Genus: Leidya
- Species: L. infelix

Binomial name
- Leidya infelix Markham, 2002

Species of crustacean

Leidya infelix is an isopoda parasite present in the waters off the west of Baja California, Mexico. First described in 2002, by Markham, J. C.

== Etymology ==
The specie's name "infelix" Latin for "ill-fated" or "un-fortunate" was chosen because of the inability to describe this species for close to 90 years.

== Description ==
Leidya infelix is a species known to parasitize Pachygrapsus crassipes. The female holotype was 7.9 mm long, the maximal width was 5.6 mm, head length being 1.8, and pleon length being 2.2 mm. A male specimen was found to be 1.04 mm long, with a maximal width of 0.26 mm, head length 0.12 mm, and pleon length of 0.34 mm. All the regions of the body are distinct. The head of the female is completely embedded in to the pereon. Females have 6 pleomeres. Males have 6 pleomeres, as well. They also have dark dorsal splotches on most of their pleomeres.
