= Argeiinae =

- Argeia pugettensis female

Scientific classification
- Kingdom: Animalia
- Phylum: Arthropoda
- Clade: Pancrustacea
- Class: Malacostraca
- Order: Isopoda
- Suborder: Epicaridea
- Superfamily: Bopyroidea
- Family: Bopyridae
- Subfamily: Argeiinae; Markham, 1977

Type genus
- Argeia Dana, 1853

Genera
- Argeia Dana, 1853; Argeiopsis Kensley, 1974; Bopyrosa Nierstrasz & Brender à Brandis, 1923; Eragia Markham, 1994; Gareia Bourdon & Bruce, 1983; Paraeragia An, Zhang & Paulay, 2017; Parargeia Hansen, 1897; Stegoalpheon Chopra, 1923; Stegoargeia An, Boyko & Li, 2015

Subfamily of isopods

Argeiinae is a subfamily of marine crustacean-ectoparasitic epicaridean isopods. It is part of the family Bopyridae.

== Descriptions and ecology ==
As with all epicarideans, the adults are extremely sexually dimorphic. In both females and males the head is much wider than long, with all body regions being distinct from each other. The pereon is segmented in both males and females, while the pleon is unsegmented in males and may be segmented in the females. Females have 5 pairs of uniramous or biramous pleopods, which either are tubercle-like or ovate flaps, and a pair of subequal uropods, while males entirely lack pleonal appendages. The female brood pouch is usually exposed.

Argeiines are branchial ectoparasites of stenopodidean and caridean decapods.

== Taxonomy ==
Argeiinae has 13 accepted species in 9 valid genera. All genera are very small, only having 1-3 species. It is debated if the family is monophyletic, as some genera may be closer to other subfamilies than others.

Argeia Dana, 1853

- Argeia atlantica Markham, 1977
- Argeia pugettensis Dana, 1853

Argeiopsis Kensley, 1974

- Argeiopsis guamensis An, Zhang & Paulay, 2017
- Argeiopsis inhacae Kensley, 1974
- Argeiopsis kensleyi Boyko & Kazmi, 2005

Bopyrosa Nierstrasz & Brender à Brandis, 1923

- Bopyrosa phryxiformis Nierstrasz & Brender à Brandis, 1923

Eragia Markham, 1994

- Eragia profunda Markham, 1994

Gareia Bourdon & Bruce, 1983

- Gareia arafurae Bourdon & Bruce, 1983

Paraeragia An, Zhang & Paulay, 2017

- Paraeragia kiribatiensis An, Zhang & Paulay, 2017

Parargeia Hansen, 1897

- Parargeia ornata Hansen, 1897

Stegoalpheon Chopra, 1923

- Stegoalpheon kempi Chopra, 1923

Stegoargeia An, Boyko & Li, 2015

- Stegoargeia lowisi (Chopra, 1923)
- Stegoargeia nierstraszi (Shiino, 1958)
