= Halopteris =

Halopteris may refer to:

- Halopteris (cnidarian), a genus of hydrozoa in the family Halopterididae
- Halopteris (protist), a genus of protists in the family Stypocaulaceae
