= Acrobelione reverberii =

Scientific classification
- Kingdom: Animalia
- Phylum: Arthropoda
- Class: Malacostraca
- Order: Isopoda
- Family: Bopyridae
- Genus: Acrobelione
- Species: A. reverberii

Binomial name
- Acrobelione reverberii (Restivo, 1970)

Species of crustacean

Acrobelione reverberii is a species of crustacean isopod in the genus Acrobelione.
