= Leidya =

Scientific classification
- Kingdom: Animalia
- Phylum: Arthropoda
- Clade: Pancrustacea
- Class: Malacostraca
- Order: Isopoda
- Family: Bopyridae
- Subfamily: Keponinae
- Genus: Leidya; Leidy, 1855

Type species
- Leidya distorta Cornalia & Panceri, 1861

Species
- See text

Genus of crustaceans

Leidya is a genus of isopod parasites, that inhabit the waters off China, Mexico, and the Gulf of Mexico. They are in the family Bopyridae, the genus contains the following species:

- Leidya bimini Pearse, 1951
- Leidya distorta Leidy, 1855
- Leidya infelix Markham, 2002
- Leidya ucae Pearse, 1930
