= Antennellopsis =

Scientific classification
- Kingdom: Animalia
- Phylum: Cnidaria
- Class: Hydrozoa
- Order: Leptothecata
- Family: Halopterididae
- Genus: Antennellopsis; Jäderholm, 1896
- Species: A. integerrima

Binomial name
- Antennellopsis integerrima Jäderholm, 1919

Genus of hydrozoans

Antennellopsis is a monotypic genus of hydrozoans belonging to the family Halopterididae. The only species is Antennellopsis integerrima.

The species is found in Japan, New Zealand.
