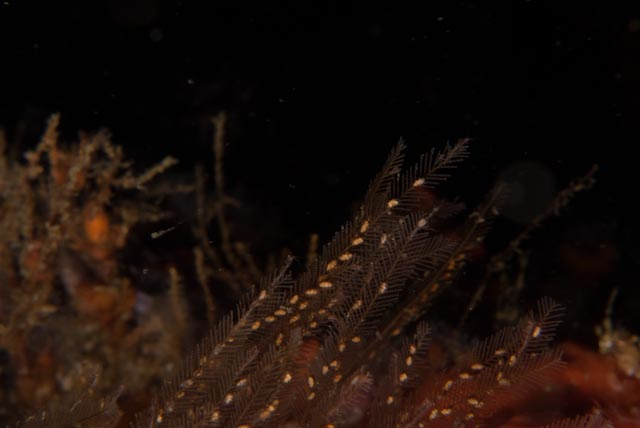
- Corhiza scotiae

Scientific classification
- Kingdom: Animalia
- Phylum: Cnidaria
- Class: Hydrozoa
- Order: Leptothecata
- Family: Halopterididae
- Genus: Corhiza; Millard, 1962

= Corhiza =

Genus of hydrozoans

Corhiza is a genus of hydrozoans in the family Halopterididae.

== Species ==
The following species are classed in this genus:

- Corhiza bellicosa Millard, 1962
- Corhiza complexa (Nutting, 1905)
- Corhiza fascicularis (Allman, 1883)
- Corhiza pannosa Millard, 1962
- Corhiza pauciarmata Ansín Agís, Vervoort & Ramil, 2009
- Corhiza scotiae (Ritchie, 1907)
- Corhiza sociabilis Millard, 1980
- Corhiza splendens Vervoort & Watson, 2003
- Corhiza suensoni (Jäderholm, 1896)
