= Atergatis roseus =

Scientific classification
- Kingdom: Animalia
- Phylum: Arthropoda
- Clade: Pancrustacea
- Class: Malacostraca
- Order: Decapoda
- Suborder: Pleocyemata
- Infraorder: Brachyura
- Family: Xanthidae
- Genus: Atergatis
- Species: A. roseus

Binomial name
- Atergatis roseus (Rüppell, 1830)

Synonyms
- Atergatis scrobiculatus Heller, 1861; Cancer orientalis Herbst, 1790; Carpilius marginatus Rüppell, 1830; Carpilius roseus Rüppell, 1830

Species of crab

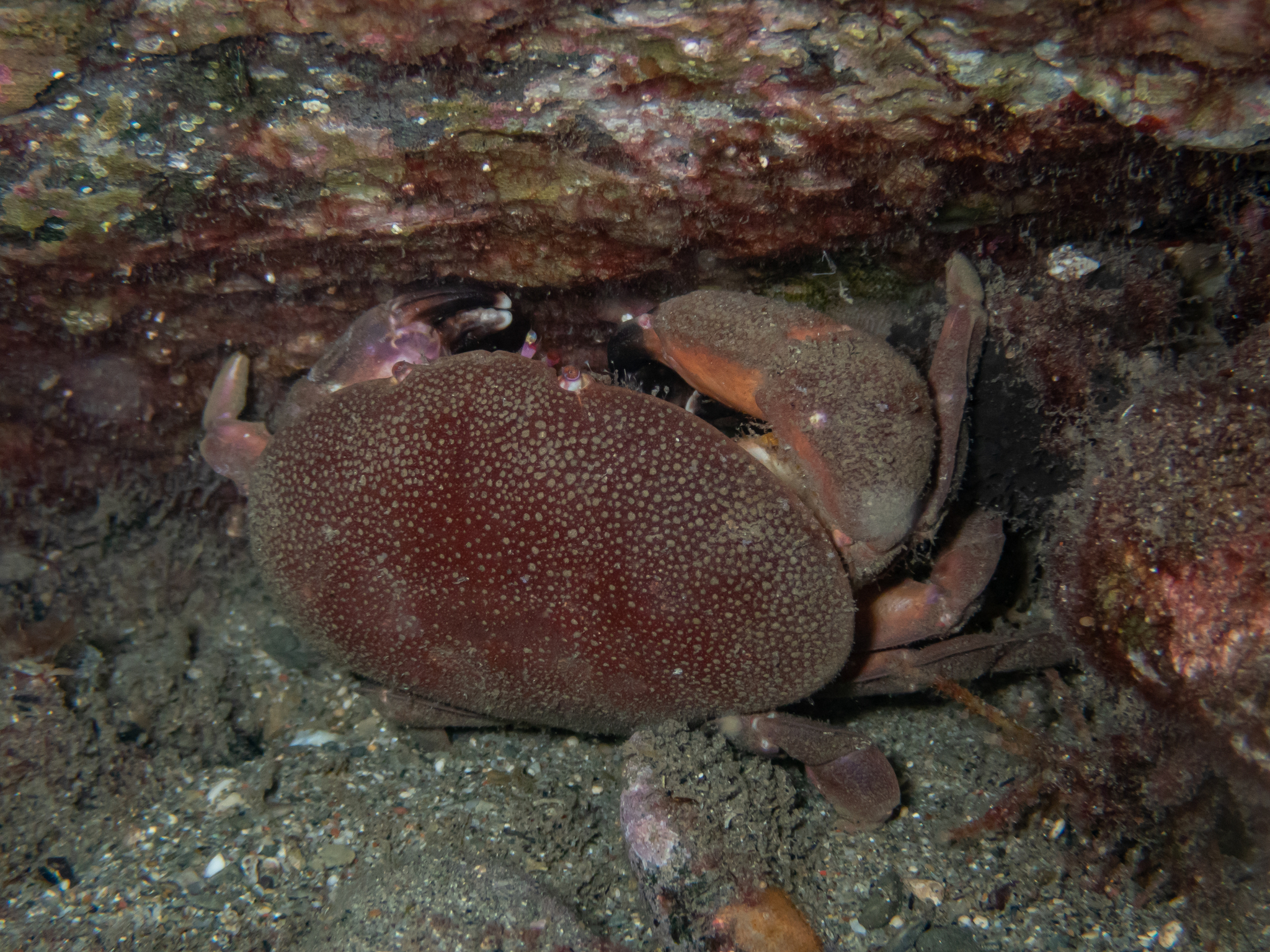

Atergatis roseus, the pancake crab, is a species of reef crab from the family Xanthidae with a natural range extending from the Red Sea to Fiji. It has colonised the eastern Mediterranean by Lessepsian migration through the Suez Canal. The flesh of this crab, like many other species in the family Xanthidae, is toxic.

== Description ==
Atergatis roseus has a wide, smooth, oval carapace with convex almost entire, with no indication of regions and with bluntly crested anterolateral margins. The pereiopods are laterally compressed with distal crests on the upper and lower margins. The carapace is reddish brown and the legs have black tips, younger specimens are paler, more reddish orange, with a white margins to the carapace. They grow to 6 cm, measuring the carapace length from the head to the posterior.

== Distribution ==
Atergatis roseus has wide Indo-Pacific distribution being found from the Red Sea and eastern Africa, south to KwaZulu-Natal east along the coasts of the Indian Ocean into the Pacific as far as Fiji. In the eastern Mediterranean, A. roseus was first recorded from Israel in 1961, then from Lebanon and the southern coasts of Turkey and Syria. It reached the Aegean Sea in 2005 and was found as far as Rhodes by 2009.

== Biology ==
Atergatis roseus inhabits coral reefs and rocky substrata, from the low tide mark to a depth of 30 metres. It prefers shallow reef rich areas with an abundance of places to hide. It is mainly nocturnal, as well as slow moving, and so it prefers to be near the security of a hiding place to which it can retreat when threatened. It is omnivorous but a large part of its diet is made up of plant material, although specimens have been recorded feeding on fish.

== Toxicity ==
The meat of Atergatis roseus, like that of many other crabs from the family Xanthidae is toxic. The toxins are synthesised by bacteria of the genus Vibrio which live in symbiosis with the crab and the poisons are one similar to those found in puffer fish, i.e. tetrodotoxin, and also paralytic shellfish poison.
