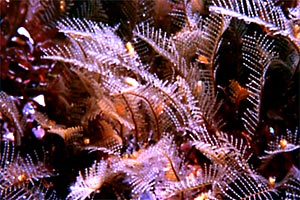

Scientific classification
- Kingdom: Animalia
- Phylum: Cnidaria
- Class: Hydrozoa
- Order: Leptothecata
- Family: Aglaopheniidae
- Genus: Aglaophenia
- Species: A. pluma

Binomial name
- Aglaophenia pluma (Linnaeus, 1758)

Synonyms
- Sertularia pluma Linnaeus, 1758; Plumularia pluma (Linnaeus, 1758); Plumularia cristata Lamarck, 1816

= Aglaophenia pluma =

Species of cnidarian

Aglaophenia pluma, the toothed feather hydroid or podded hydroid, is a colonial hydroid in the family Aglaopheniidae and is found worldwide. It lives from the shore to 120m under water.

== Description ==
Toothed feather hydroids are upright colonial hydroids with stems which may grow to 3 cm in total height though the colony may be larger. They have unbranched yellow stems and reproductive bodies that resemble pine-cones.

== Ecology ==
This species has a sting which may cause swelling of the affected area in humans.
