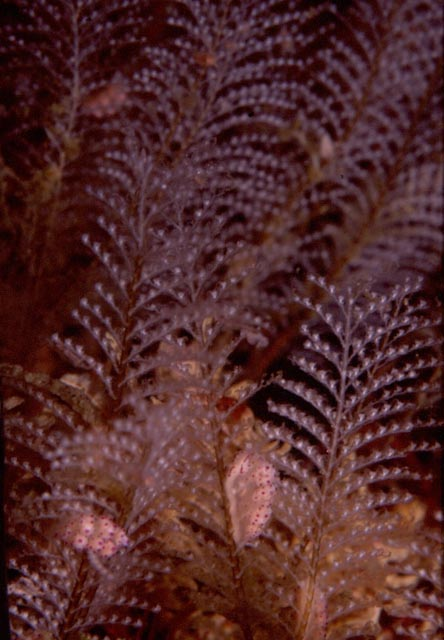
- Gattya humilis with Doto coronata

Scientific classification
- Kingdom: Animalia
- Phylum: Cnidaria
- Class: Hydrozoa
- Order: Leptothecata
- Family: Halopterididae
- Genus: Gattya; Allman, 1885

= Gattya =

Genus of cnidarians

Gattya is a genus of hydroids in the family Halopterididae.

The genus name of Gattya is in honour of Margaret Gatty (née Scott, 1809–1873), who was an English children's author and writer on marine biology.

The genus was circumscribed by William Henry Harvey in Trans. Roy. Irish Acad. Vol. 22 (Edition 5, Sci.) on page 555 in 1855.

== Species ==
The following species are classed in the genus Gattya:

- Gattya aglaopheniaformis (Mulder & Trebilcock, 1909)
- Gattya balei (Bartlett, 1907)
- Gattya conspecta (Billard, 1907)
- Gattya heurteli (Billard, 1907)
- Gattya humilis Allman, 1885
- Gattya multithecata (Jarvis, 1922)
- Gattya trebilcocki Watson, 1973
- Gattya tropicalis Millard & Bouillon, 1973
- Gattya wimleni Gravier-Bonnet, 1998
