= Parasymmetrorbione =

Scientific classification
- Kingdom: Animalia
- Phylum: Arthropoda
- Class: Malacostraca
- Order: Isopoda
- Family: Bopyridae
- Subfamily: Orbioninae
- Genus: Parasymmetrorbione; An, Boyko & Li, 2013
- Species: P. bicauda

Binomial name
- Parasymmetrorbione bicauda An, Boyko & Li, 2013

Genus of crustaceans

Parasymmetrorbione is a genus of isopod containing a single species, Parasymmetrorbione bicauda.

== Etymology ==
The name of the genus was chosen because of its apparent close relationship with the Asymmetrorbione genus.

== Distribution ==
Parasymmetrorbione bicauda inhabits the waters of the South China Sea.

== Description ==
Like most Bopyridae species, the female is quite larger than its male counterpart. The females measure 11.57mm long; 9.67mm wide. The males have been recorded to be 4.1 mm long; 1.61 mm wide.

== Parasitism ==
Like all species of the subfamily Orbioninae, P. bicauda parasitize the branchials of penaeid shrimp. P. bicauda has been found to infest two species of Solenocera: Solenocera comata and Solenocera alticarinata.
