= Allobopyrus =

Scientific classification
- Kingdom: Animalia
- Phylum: Arthropoda
- Clade: Pancrustacea
- Class: Malacostraca
- Order: Isopoda
- Family: Bopyridae
- Subfamily: Bopyrinae
- Genus: Allobopyrus; Bourdon, 1983
- Species: A. rumphius

Binomial name
- Allobopyrus rumphius Bourdon, 1983

Genus of crustaceans

Allobopyrus is a monotypic genus of Isopoda parasites, in the family Bopyridae. The only species is Allobopyrus rumphiusi.
