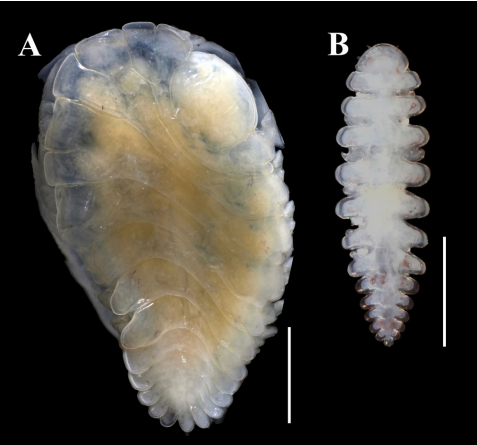
- A specimen of Eremitione clibanaricola

Scientific classification
- Kingdom: Animalia
- Phylum: Arthropoda
- Class: Malacostraca
- Order: Isopoda
- Family: Bopyridae
- Genus: Eremitione; Williams & Boyko in Williams, Boyko & Madad, 2019

Type species
- Phryxus hyndmanni Bate & Westwood, 1867

= Eremitione =

Genus of crustaceans

Eremitione is a genus of isopods in the family Bopyridae that are characterized as ectoparasites of hermit crabs and king crabs. They can be found throughout the world in tropical and temperate areas. Like most genera of Bopyridae, they live in the gill cavities of these crabs where they cause a visible swelling. Notably, while most of the species of Eremitione parasitize hermit crabs, there is a singular species of Eremitione, E. tuberculata that parasitizes king crabs.

== Taxonomic history ==
The 9 species the genus Eremitione consists of now were initially part of 88 species described or placed in Pseudione Kossmann, 1881. By 2017, many of these species had been transferred to other genera or synonymised, and only 53 of the initial 88 species were left in the genus Pseudione. Yet, many of the species within the genera still differed greatly morphologically from one another, with the only common feature amongst the species being the number of pleopods pairs. Specifically, all females in the genus had five pairs of biramous (branched) pleopods whereas males had five pairs of ovate tuberculiform uniramous (knob-like and unbranched) pleopods. In 2017, Boyko et al. defined Pseudione based on the characteristics of its type species P. callianassae, specifically, their hosts of mud shrimp, ghost shrimp and lobsters. In this way, the new Pseudione sensu stricto consisted of only 8 species. There was thus now a need to redefine the 45 other species. For the 9 monophyletic species parasitizing hermit and king crabs, this was the genus Eremitione erected in 2019 by Boyko and Williams, with the Phryxus hyndmanni as its type species.

== Species ==
The genus name is a portmanteau of the generic names Eremita, (Osbeck 1765) meaning hermit in English, and Ione, commonly used as a suffix for the Bopyridae genera. Notably, the name Eremita is also the oldest generic name given to a hermit crab. There are 9 species that currently belong to the genus Eremitione.

- Eremitione biacuta Bourdon, 1979
- Eremitione brandaoi Brian & Darteville, 1941
- Eremitione calcinii Shiino, 1958
- Eremitione clibanaricola Shiino, 1933
- Eremitione giardi Calman, 1898
- Eremitione hyndmanni Bate & Westwood, 1867
- Eremitione lata Shiino, 1958
- Eremitione nobilii Nierstrasz & Brender à Brandis, 1923
- Eremitione quasimodo Boyko & Williams, 2004
- Eremitione tuberculata Richardson, 1904

== Morphology ==
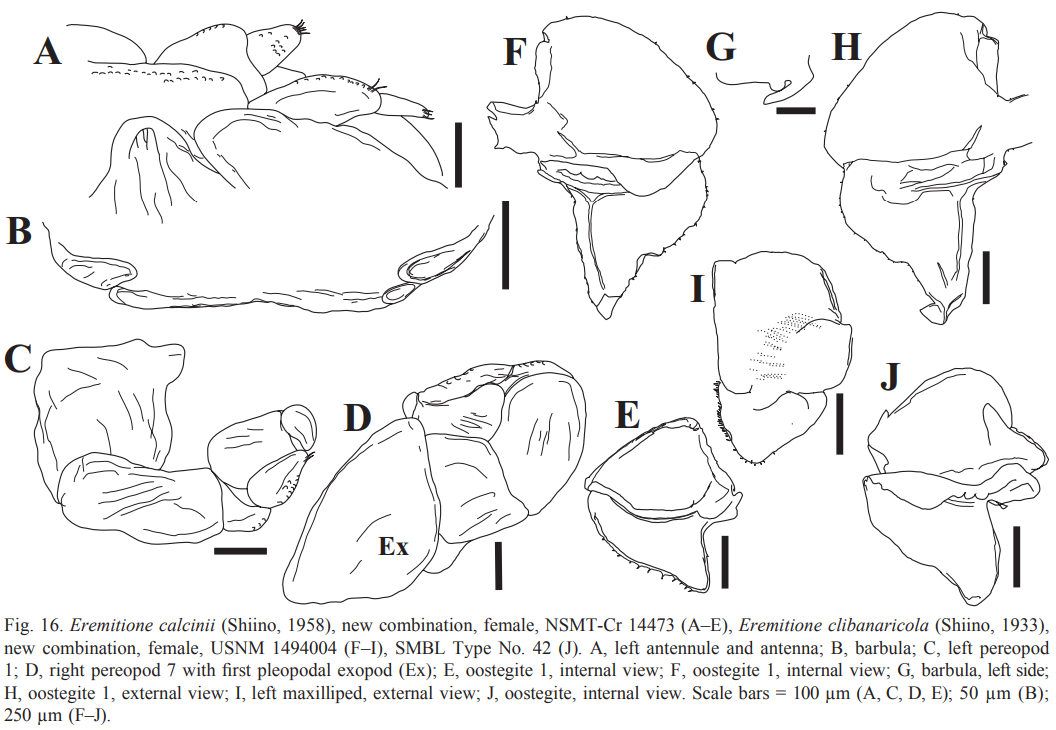
Diagram of a female Eremitione calcinii

Female Eremitione have elongated bodies that are generally curved dextrally (to the right) or sinistrally (to the left) and normally consists of distinct and visible segments. They have a frontal lamina (plate at the front of its head) that is weakly developed (no projections) and smooth. For its barbula (little beard in Latin, refers to the mouth area) female species either have two lateral projections where the outer projection is more than twice the length of the inner projection, or a single long projection on each side that meet in the middle. Additionally, the central area of the barbula is either smooth or has many small lobes. The maxilliped (feeding appendage) for the females have a single palp (extension). The maxilliped may have a projecting tip, and if so, they may also have setae (bristles) on this projecting tip. Females have oostegites, brood plates that help form a brood chamber for eggs. The first pair of these oostegites have posterolateral points that are tapered or sharply curved backward as well as inner ridges that are smooth or weakly developed. Females have coxal plates (side plates at the base of the legs) on their pereon (thorax), that have little to no projections on the first 4 pereomeres. These coxal plates exist (segments of the thorax) on at least one side of their thorax. The second and third pereomeres have roughly the same width, but are generally wider than the 4th pereomere. There is also a gradual change in shape from the top pereomere to the bottom pereomere from being rounded to looking more tapered. Their pereopods (legs) have short carpi (wrist segments) with scales found only on the outer surface of the meri (mid-segments). The dorsal (upper) parts of the pereopods on the other hand are inflated and covered in scales. Following that, their pleon (abdomen) also have 6 pleomeres (abdominal segments). This pleon is generally narrower than the pereon. While the sixth pleomere is visible from above, the other five segments have lateral plates that do not project outwards, rather extending towards the back and sides of the pleon. They have five pairs of pleopods (swimming limbs) and a pair of uropods (tail appendages). While both of these appendages are smooth and lance-shaped, the pleopods are biramous (branched) while the uropods are uniramous (unbranched).

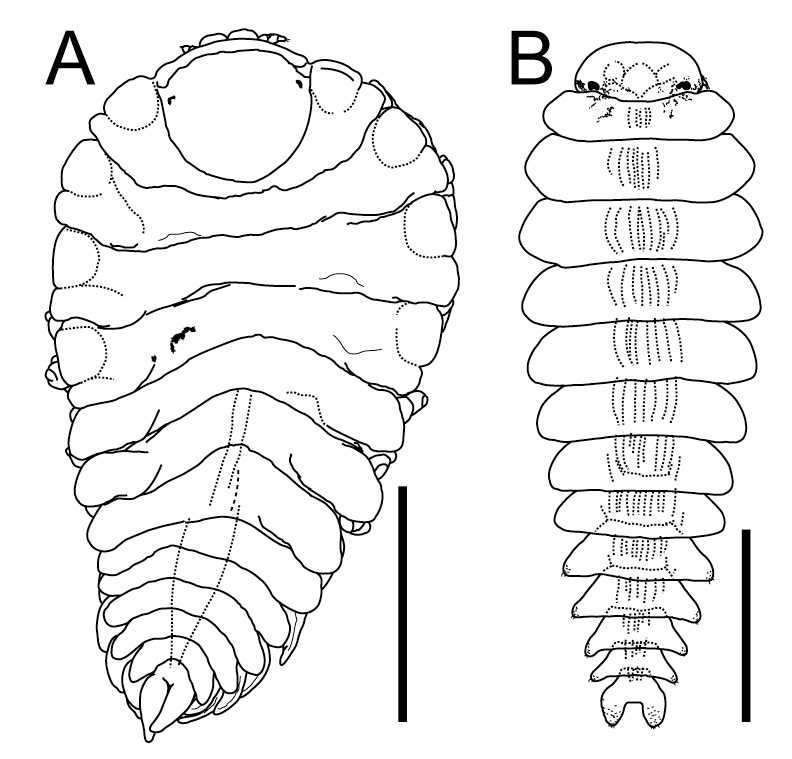
Diagram of dorsal view of female (left) and male (right) Eremitione quasimodo

Male Eremitione have straight bodies that taper both towards the anterior (front) and back (posterior), with its widest region being the middle of its thorax. While this sometimes the cases when comparing genders in other species, the anterior pereopods (front legs) are not noticeably larger than its other legs. Additionally, while it still has six distinct pleomeres for its pleon, its pleopods (swimming limbs) are noticeably uniramous compared to the female's biramous pleopods as well as tuberculiform (short, knob-like) rather than elongated. Lastly, males do not have uropods. Instead the posterolateral edges of their pleotelson (tail end of the pleon) have slight to significant extensions or lobes.

== Ecology ==
As they infest hermit crabs and king crabs, Eremitione can generally be found in tropical and temperate oceans where their hosts tend to live. For example, while the type species Eremitione Hyndmanni was found of the coast of Ireland and has since been found infesting a variety of paguroids from countries like Norway to even islands on New Zealand, the Eremitione quasimodo was found at the Andros Island of the Bahamas, and the Eremitione clibanaricola has been spotted in both Tanabe Bay, Japan as well as in various parts of the Philippines. It has also been suggested that Eremitione are more likely to thrive amongst sea bottoms with restricted circulation of water, allowing the larvae of the Eremitione to be retained within their hosts. Such conditions have been found amongst large algae on sea beds in the Magellan Strait as well as in rocky areas with kelp forests in San Jorge Gulf, Southwestern Atlantic Ocean.

== Behavior and effects on host ==
Like all species of bopyridae, Eremitione are partial parasitic castrators that interfere with but do not necessarily block reproduction of its hermit or king crab hosts. Specifically, bopyrid parasites have been observed to inhibit the growth of the crab's gonads. However, this effect is not permanent on ovaries. Crabs can recover from the parasites, observed via swollen but empty branchial chambers. After recovery from the parasite, the crabs can regenerate their ovaries and produce offspring. Additionally, they also cause nutritional deficiencies and a reduction in the rate of maturation. While they are sublethal, results suggest that they lead to a high mortality rate amongst smaller crabs. A high positive correlation between the sizes of Eremitione parasites and those of their crab hosts also suggest that they tend to infest hermit crabs early in the crab's lifecycle and grow in synchrony with their host. Some Eremitione, like E. tuberculata, have been observed to prefer a certain side of the branchial chamber, the left side in the case of E. tuberculata. Compared to non-parasitic isopods of similar size, the fertility of Eremitione is noticeably high, and also increases with size. For example, Eremitione hyndmanni, the type species of Eremitione, of 3mm can bear up to 1000 eggs, whereas those of length 7mm can up to 9000 eggs.

== Life cycle ==
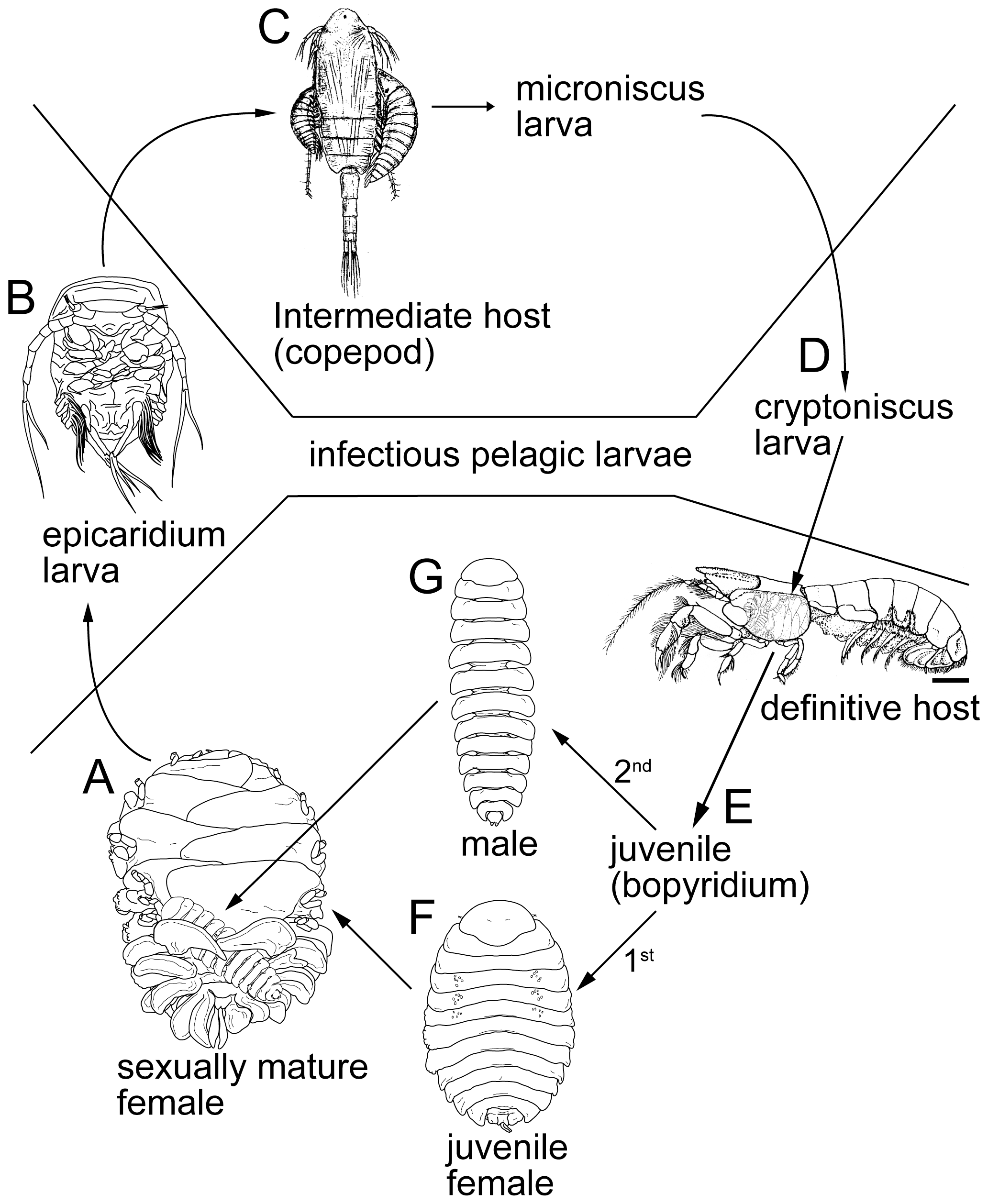
Lifecycle of a common bopyrid isopod, which can be extended to that of the Eremitione

Larvae is first borne out of the brood chambers of female Eremitiones. These epicaridium (first of three larval stages) larvae are eventually released from the brood chambers, swimming out into water to infest planktonic copepod intermediate hosts. Within these intermediate hosts, they mature into microniscus (second of the three larval stages) larvae. Eventually, the isopod develops into their cryptoniscus (final of three larval stages) stage, where they again swim out of the copepod and eventually move onto their definitive hosts, attaching themselves to the branchial chambers of the host hermit or king crab. Strikingly, the Eremitione tuberculata has been observed to live up to 8 years old, the longest amongst currently known bopyrids. It is suggested that this is related to the low temperatures that the species thrives in.

== Eremitione tuberculata ==
There is a notable outlier amongst the current species of Eremitione in the Eremitione tuberculata. It primarily differs from other species of Eremitione morphologically. Female E. tuberculata have straight bodies while females from the other Eremitione species have curved bodies. The dorsolateral bumps (bumps on the side of the thorax) on the 5th to 7th pereomeres of female E. tuberculata are greatly inflated, with the front ones overshadowing the back ones. For females of other Eremitione, their dorsolateral bumps are not inflated and do not overlap. While the oostegites and pleopods of most female Eremitione are smooth, those of the E. tuberculata are covered in small bumps. At the same time, the pleon proportion is also significantly different, with the pleon making up 40 percent of the body length in female E. tuberculata and less than 33 percent of the body length in other species. Lastly for females, while the lateral plates on pleomeres are much wider than the central part of each pleomere in E. tuberculata, most females in Eremitione have lateral plates only slightly wider or expanded in comparison to the central part of their pleomere. For males, the core difference is in the pleotelson (tail end of the pleon). E. tuberculata have globular (rounded) pleotelsons and lack the posterolateral extensions that most other Eremitione have. This last difference is not unique to the E. tuberculata however, as the males of the E. hyndmanni, notably the type species of Eremitione, also lack these extensions. Another key difference that separates E. tuberculata and general Eremitione is in their hosts. E. tuberculata are the only species that infest king crabs, compared to the hermit crabs that other Eremitione infest.

The morphological differences, being only very slight in nature, was explained by Boyko & Williams when deciding what species to incorporate into Eremitione as adaptations to their host of the king crab. The difference in host was more contentious, as though there is molecular evidence to the evolutionary development from hermit crabs to king crabs, the scientific community still has their doubts on this particular evolutionary relationship. Regardless, the position that they are evolutionarily related was taken, in turn implying that E. tuberculata is phylogenically related to the other Eremitione. While E. tuberculata may still require the erection of a separate genus, analysis of E. tuberculata can further delve into the evolutionary relationship between king crabs and hermit crabs. Recently, a new yet to be widely accepted species of Eremitione, E. rybakovi has been discovered off the western parts of the Bering Sea. This species also infests the king crab and shares the morphological differences that E. tuberculata has in comparison to their other congeners, although these differences are less pronounced in E. rybakovi.
