= Acrobelione =

Scientific classification
- Kingdom: Animalia
- Phylum: Arthropoda
- Clade: Pancrustacea
- Class: Malacostraca
- Order: Isopoda
- Family: Bopyridae
- Subfamily: Pseudioninae
- Genus: Acrobelione; Bourdon, 1981

Species
- See text

Genus of crustaceans

Acrobelione is a genus of Isopoda parasites, in the family Bopyridae, containing the following species:

- Acrobelione anisopoda Bourdon, 1981
- Acrobelione halimedae Boyko, Williams & Shields, 2017
- Acrobelione langi Van Name, 1920
- Acrobelione reverberii Restivo, 1970
