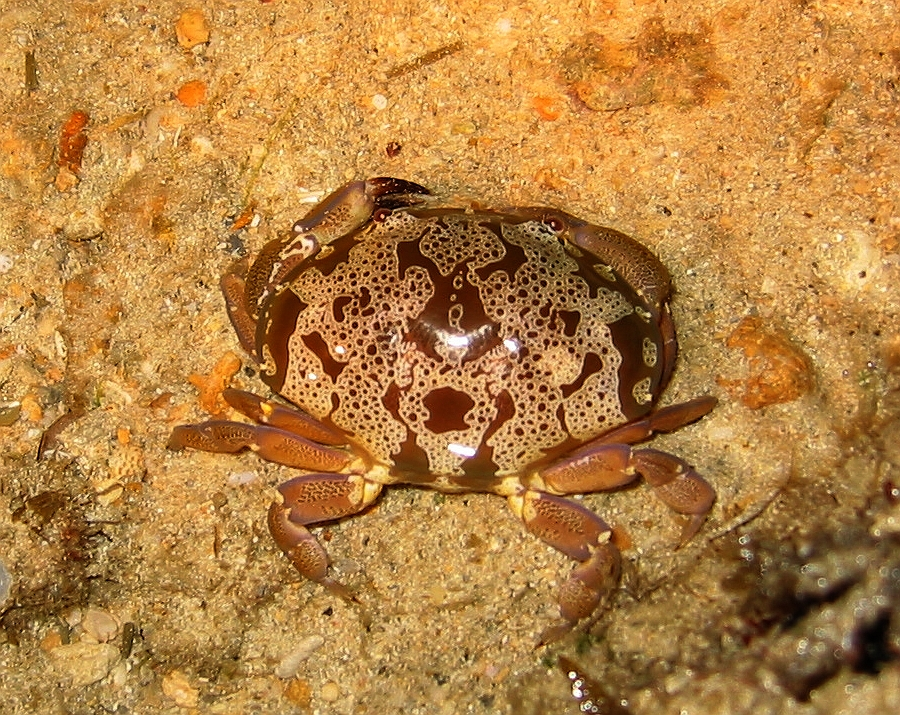
- Atergatis floridus

Scientific classification
- Domain: Eukaryota
- Kingdom: Animalia
- Phylum: Arthropoda
- Class: Malacostraca
- Order: Decapoda
- Suborder: Pleocyemata
- Infraorder: Brachyura
- Family: Xanthidae
- Subfamily: Zosiminae
- Genus: Atergatis; De Haan, 1833

= Atergatis (crab) =

Genus of crabs

Atergatis is a genus of crabs in the family Xanthidae, containing the following species:

- Atergatis dentatus De Haan, 1835
- Atergatis dilatatus De Haan, 1835
- Atergatis floridus (Linnaeus, 1767)
- Atergatis granulatus De Haan, 1889
- Atergatis integerrimus (Lamarck, 1818)
- Atergatis interruptus Takeda & Marumara, 1997
- Atergatis laevigatus A. Milne Edwards, 1865
- Atergatis latissimus (H. Milne Edwards, 1834)
- Atergatis montrouzieri A. Milne Edwards, 1873
- Atergatis nitidus A. Milne Edwards, 1865
- Atergatis ocyroe (Herbst, 1801)
- Atergatis obtusus A. Milne Edwards, 1865
- Atergatis reticulatus (De Haan, 1835)
- Atergatis roseus (Ruppell, 1830)
- Atergatis subdentatus (De Haan, 1835)
- Atergatis tweediei Ward, 1934

Six species are known from the fossil record, including three which are extinct.
