= Albunione =

Scientific classification
- Kingdom: Animalia
- Phylum: Arthropoda
- Clade: Pancrustacea
- Class: Malacostraca
- Order: Isopoda
- Family: Bopyridae
- Subfamily: Pseudioninae
- Genus: Albunione; Markham & Boyko, 1999

Genus of crustaceans

Albunione is a genus of isopod parasites, in the family Bopyridae, containing the following species:

- Albunione australiana Markham & Boyko, 1999
- Albunione indecora Markham, 1988
- Albunione yoda Markham & Boyko, 2003
