= Allorbimorphus =

Scientific classification
- Kingdom: Animalia
- Phylum: Arthropoda
- Clade: Pancrustacea
- Class: Malacostraca
- Order: Isopoda
- Family: Bopyridae
- Subfamily: Pseudioninae
- Genus: Allorbimorphus; Bourdon, 1976

Species
- See text

Genus of crustaceans

Allorbimorphus is a genus of Isopoda parasites, in the family Bopyridae, containing the following species that can be found on the coasts of Australia, and Asia:

- Allorbimorphus australiensis Bourdon, 1976
- Allorbimorphus haigae Bourdon, 1976
- Allorbimorphus scabriculi Bourdon, 1976
- Allorbimorphus tuberculus An, Zhang & Li, 2012
- Allorbimorphus lamellosus Nierstrasz & Brender à Brandis, 1923
