= Allathelges =

Scientific classification
- Kingdom: Animalia
- Phylum: Arthropoda
- Clade: Pancrustacea
- Class: Malacostraca
- Order: Isopoda
- Family: Bopyridae
- Subfamily: Athelginae
- Genus: Allathelges; Kazmi & Markham, 1999

Species
- See text

Genus of crustaceans

Allathelges is a genus of Isopoda parasites, in the family Bopyridae, containing the following species:

- Allathelges alisonae Williams & Boyko, 2016
- Allathelges pakistanensis Kazmi & Markham, 1999
