= Probopyrus =

- Probopyrus pandalicola specimen
- P. pandalicola on Palaemon pugio

Scientific classification
- Kingdom: Animalia
- Phylum: Arthropoda
- Clade: Pancrustacea
- Class: Malacostraca
- Order: Isopoda
- Family: Bopyridae
- Subfamily: Bopyrinae
- Genus: Probopyrus; Giard & Bonnier, 1888

Type species
- Bopyrus ascendens Semper, 1880

Species
- 29 species, see text

Synonyms
- Palegyge Giard & Bonnier, 1888; Palaegyge Giard & Bonnier, 1888

Genus of isopods

Probopyrus is a genus of parasitic isopods in the family Bopyridae.

== Distribution and ecology ==
Probopyrus species are parasites of palaemonid and thorid shrimp, occurring mostly in brackish and freshwater environments. They are known from tropical, sub-tropical, and temperate areas of the Atlantic, Pacific, and Indo-Pacific regions.

== Species ==
The genus Probopyrus includes the following species:

- Probopyrus aberrans Nierstrasz & Brender à Brandis, 1932
- Probopyrus abhoyai (Chopra, 1923)
- Probopyrus alcocki (Chopra, 1923)
- Probopyrus annandalei Chopra, 1923
- Probopyrus ascendens (Semper, 1880)
- Probopyrus bengalensis (Chopra, 1923)
- Probopyrus bithynis Richardson, 1904
- Probopyrus borrei (Giard & Bonnier, 1888)
- Probopyrus brachysoma (Chopra, 1923)
- Probopyrus brevipes (Bonnier, 1900)
- Probopyrus buitendijki (Horst, 1910)
- Probopyrus demani (Weber, 1892)
- Probopyrus floridensis Richardson, 1904
- Probopyrus fluviatilis (Weber, 1892)
- Probopyrus gangeticus Chopra, 1923
- Probopyrus giardi Weber, 1892
- Probopyrus godaveriensis (Chopra, 1923)
- Probopyrus incertus (Bonnier, 1900)
- Probopyrus insularis Román-Contreras & Bourdon, 2001
- Probopyrus iriomotensis Saito, Shokita & Naruse, 2010
- Probopyrus marinus (Nierstrasz & Brender à Brandis, 1923)
- Probopyrus markhami Román-Contreras, 1996
- Probopyrus pacificensis Román-Contreras, 1993
- Probopyrus palaemoni Lemos de Castro & Brasil Lima, 1974
- Probopyrus pandalicola (Packard, 1879)
- Probopyrus pica (Chopra, 1923)
- Probopyrus prashadi (Chopra, 1923)
- Probopyrus ringueleti Verdi & Schuldt, 1988
- Probopyrus semperi Nierstrasz & Brender à Brandis, 1929

Species formerly placed in this genus include:

- Probopyrus dubius Nierstrasz & Brender à Brandis, 1929 – now accepted as Anuropodione dubius (Nierstrasz & Brender à Brandis, 1929)
- Probopyrus yatsui Pearse, 1930 – now accepted as Pleurocrypta macrocephala Nierstrasz & Brender à Brandis, 1923
