= Allodiplophryxus =

Scientific classification
- Kingdom: Animalia
- Phylum: Arthropoda
- Clade: Pancrustacea
- Class: Malacostraca
- Order: Isopoda
- Family: Bopyridae
- Subfamily: Hemiarthrinae
- Genus: Allodiplophryxus; Markham, 1985

Species
- See text

Genus of crustaceans

Allodiplophryxus is a genus of Isopoda parasites, in the family Bopyridae, containing the following species that is distributed all over the Gulf of Mexico:

Species:

- Allodiplophryxus floridanus Markham, 1985
- Allodiplophryxus unilateralis An, Chen & Paulay, 2020
