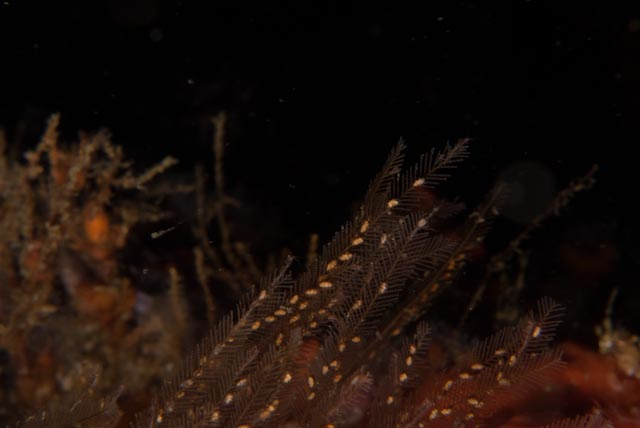
- Fine hydroid with reproductive bodies

Scientific classification
- Kingdom: Animalia
- Phylum: Cnidaria
- Class: Hydrozoa
- Order: Leptothecata
- Family: Halopterididae
- Genus: Corhiza
- Species: C. scotiae

Binomial name
- Corhiza scotiae (Ritchie, 1907)

Synonyms
- Antennella ritchiei Totton, 1930

= Corhiza scotiae =

Colonial hydroid in the family Halopterididae

Corhiza scotiae, the fine hydroid, is a delicate colonial hydroid in the family Halopterididae.

== Description ==
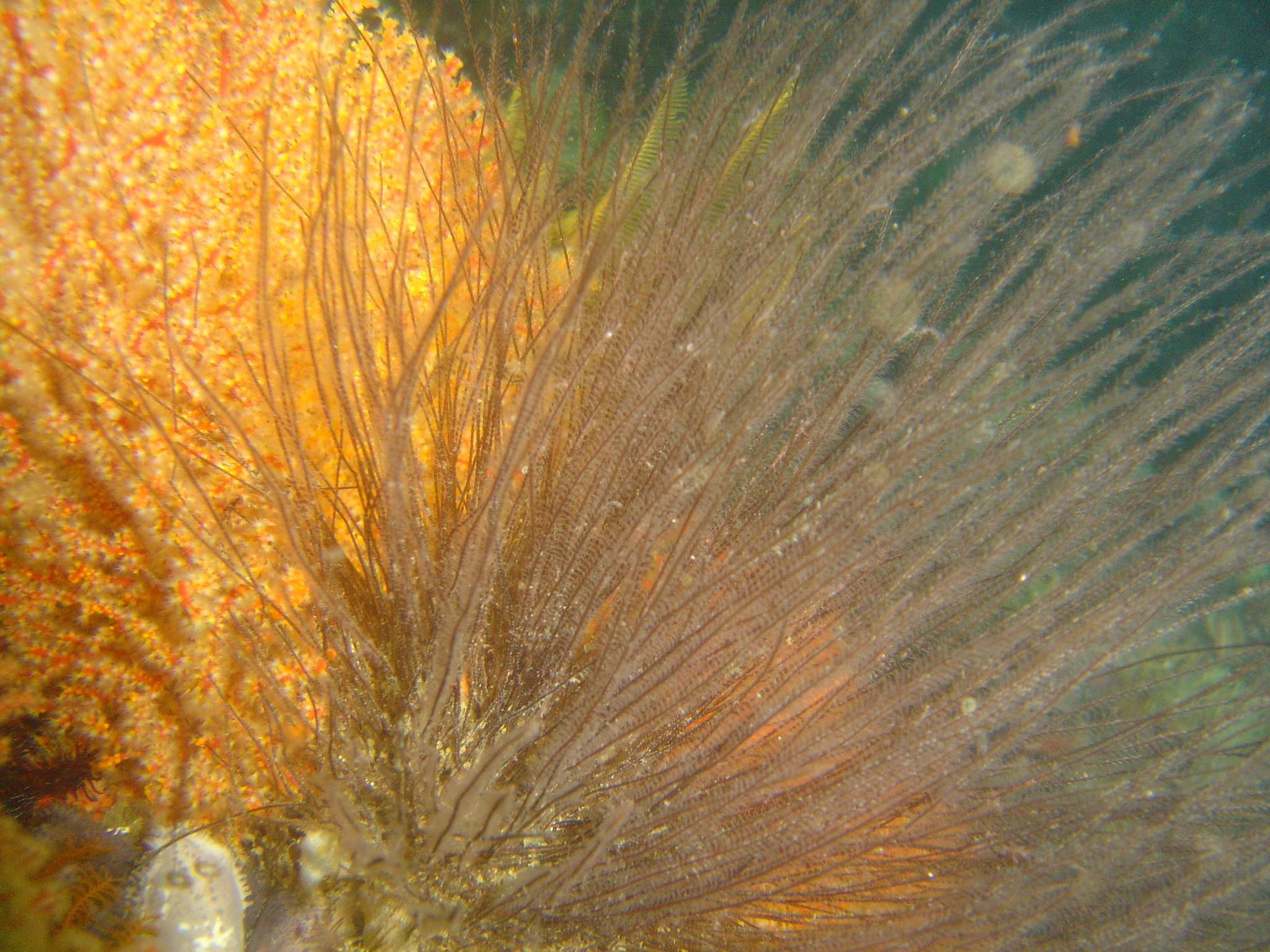
Fine hydroids at Torch Reef, False Bay, with multicoloured sea fan Acabaria rubra

Fine hydroids grow in colonies of long stems with fine brown to black branches. The colonies may grow up to 33 cm in height. The gonophores (reproductive bodies) look like small yellowish ovals, growing from the main stem of the colony.

== Distribution ==
This colonial animal is found off the South African coast from Saldanha Bay to East London in 18-120m under water. It is endemic to this region.

== Ecology ==
In this species, male and female forms live on separate colonies. Male gonophores are elongated and have blunt ends. Female gonophores bulge and have blunt lids.
