= Allokepon =

Scientific classification
- Kingdom: Animalia
- Phylum: Arthropoda
- Clade: Pancrustacea
- Class: Malacostraca
- Order: Isopoda
- Family: Bopyridae
- Subfamily: Keponinae
- Genus: Allokepon; Markham, 1982

Species
- See text

Genus of crustaceans

Allokepon is a genus of Isopoda parasites, in the family Bopyridae, containing the following species that can be found on the coasts of Asia and Africa:

- Allokepon hendersoni Giard & Bonnier, 1888
- Allokepon longicauda Duan, An & H. Yu, 2008
- Allokepon monodi Bourdon, 1967
- Allokepon sinensis Danforth, 1972
- Allokepon tiariniae Shiino, 1937
