= Cancricepon =

Scientific classification
- Kingdom: Animalia
- Phylum: Arthropoda
- Class: Malacostraca
- Order: Isopoda
- Family: Bopyridae
- Subfamily: Keponinae
- Genus: Cancricepon; Giard & Bonnier, 1887

Synonyms
- Merocepon Richardson, 1910

Genus of crustaceans

Cancricepon is a genus of isopod crustaceans in the family Bopyridae including species formerly included in the deprecated Merocepon Richardson, 1910.

== Species ==
- Cancricepon anagibbosus Bourdon, 1971
- Cancricepon choprae (Nierstrasz & Brender à Brandis, 1925)
- Cancricepon elegans Giard & Bonnier, 1887
- Cancricepon garthi Danforth, 1970
- Cancricepon knudseni (Danforth, 1970)
- Cancricepon multituberosum An, Yu & Williams, 2012
- Cancricepon pilula Giard & Bonnier, 1887
- Cancricepon savignyi (Stebbing, 1910)
- Cancricepon xanthi (Richardson, 1910)
