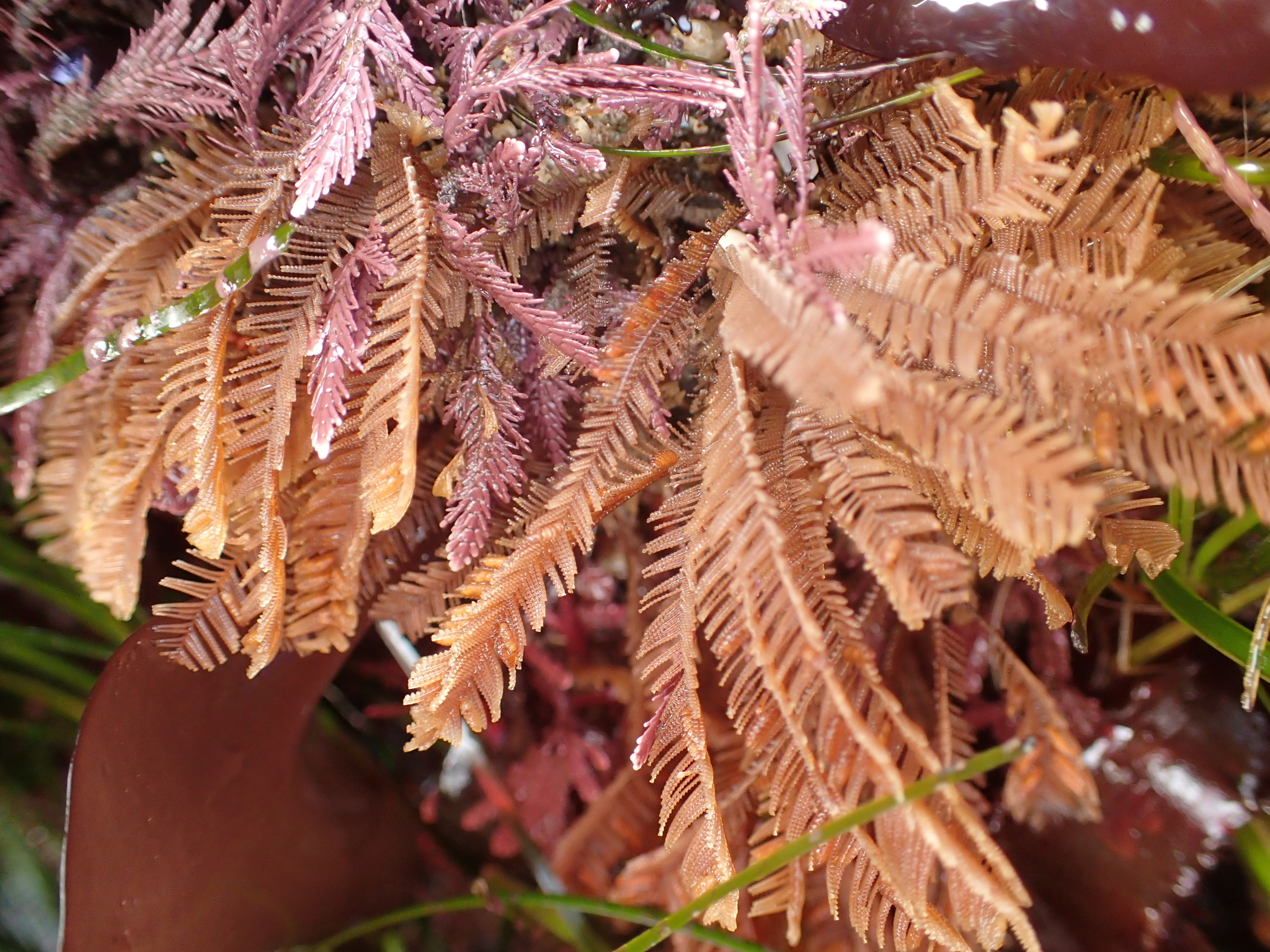

Scientific classification
- Kingdom: Animalia
- Phylum: Cnidaria
- Class: Hydrozoa
- Order: Leptothecata
- Family: Aglaopheniidae
- Genus: Aglaophenia
- Species: A. struthionides

Binomial name
- Aglaophenia struthionides (Murray, 1860)

= Aglaophenia struthionides =

Species of cnidarian

Aglaophenia struthionides, the ostrich plume hydroid, is a colonial hydroid in the family Aglaopheniidae. It is found in tide pools and on rocky shores on the Pacific coast of North America from Alaska to approximately San Diego. Ostrich plume hydroid is brown or beige, and can grow up to 12 cm tall. This species was first described by Andrew Murray in 1860.
