= Aporobopyrus =

Scientific classification
- Kingdom: Animalia
- Phylum: Arthropoda
- Clade: Pancrustacea
- Class: Malacostraca
- Order: Isopoda
- Family: Bopyridae
- Subfamily: Pseudioninae
- Genus: Aporobopyrus; Nobili, 1906

Species
- See text

Genus of crustaceans

Aporobopyrus is a genus of isopod parasites, in the family Bopyridae, that contains the following 20 species:

- Aporobopyrus aduliticus Nobili, 1906
- Aporobopyrus bonairensis Markham, 1988
- Aporobopyrus bourdonis Markham, 2008
- Aporobopyrus calypso Bourdon, 1976
- Aporobopyrus collardi Adkison, 1988
- Aporobopyrus curtatus Richardson, 1904
- Aporobopyrus dollfusi Bourdon, 1976
- Aporobopyrus enosteoidis Markham, 1982
- Aporobopyrus galleonus Williams & Madad, 2010
- Aporobopyrus gracilis Nierstrasz & Brender à Brandis, 1929
- Aporobopyrus megacephalon Nierstrasz & Brender à Brandis, 1929
- Aporobopyrus muguensis Shiino, 1964
- Aporobopyrus orientalis Shiino, 1933
- Aporobopyrus oviformis Shiino, 1934
- Aporobopyrus parvulus Bourdon, 1983
- Aporobopyrus parvus Shiino, 1939
- Aporobopyrus pleopodatus Bourdon, 1983
- Aporobopyrus retrorsa Richardson, 1910
- Aporobopyrus ryukyuensis Shiino, 1939
- Aporobopyrus trilobatus Nierstrasz & Brender à Brandis, 1925
