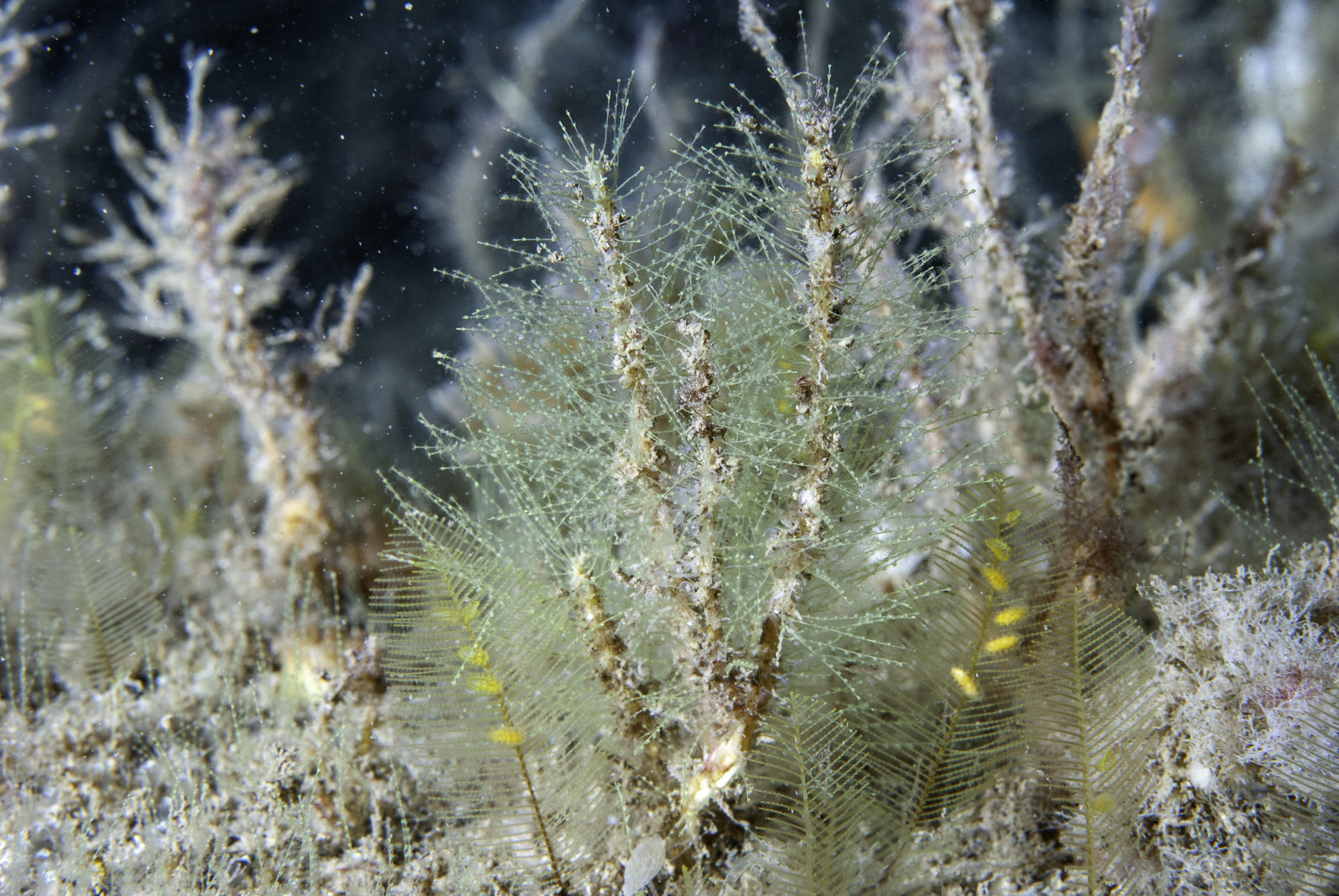

Scientific classification
- Kingdom: Animalia
- Phylum: Cnidaria
- Class: Hydrozoa
- Order: Leptothecata
- Family: Halopterididae
- Genus: Antennella; Allman, 1877

= Antennella =

Genus of cnidarians

Antennella is a genus of hydrozoans belonging to the family Halopterididae.

The genus has a cosmopolitan distribution.

== Species ==
The following species are recognised in the genus Antennella:

- Antennella ansini Peña Cantero & García Carrascosa, 2002
- Antennella armata Galea, 2010
- Antennella aurantia Yu, Lee & Hwang, 2024
- Antennella avalonia Torrey, 1902
- Antennella biarmata Nutting, 1927
- Antennella billardi Galea, 2021
- Antennella campanulaformis (Mulder & Trebilcock, 1909)
- Antennella confusa Ansin Agis, Ramil & Vervoort, 2001
- Antennella curvitheca Fraser, 1937
- Antennella flava Galea & Maggioni, 2024
- Antennella gracilis Allman, 1877
- Antennella incerta Galea, 2010
- Antennella kiwiana Schuchert, 1997
- Antennella peculiaris Galea, 2013
- Antennella quadriaurita Ritchie, 1909
- Antennella quaterna Galea, 2015
- Antennella recta Nutting, 1927
- Antennella secundaria (Gmelin, 1791)
- Antennella sibogae (Billard, 1911)
- Antennella siliquosa (Hincks, 1877)
- Antennella similis Galea, 2013
- Antennella singulata Watson, 2011
- Antennella sinuosa Ansín Agís, Vervoort & Ramil, 2009
- Antennella tubitheca Galea, 2013
- Antennella tubulosa (Bale, 1894)
- Antennella varians (Billard, 1911)
