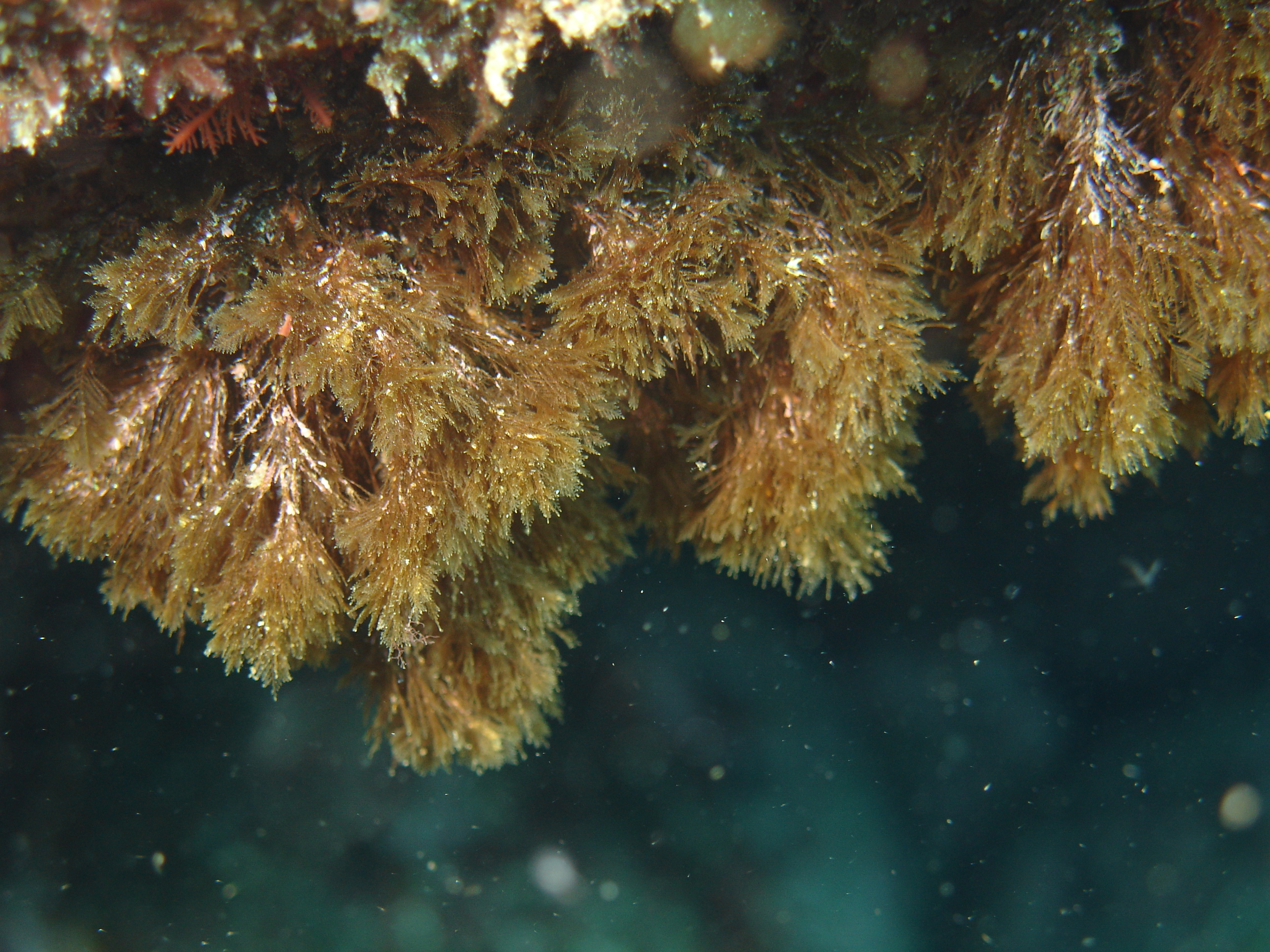
- Halopteris filicina

Scientific classification
- Kingdom: Animalia
- Phylum: Cnidaria
- Class: Hydrozoa
- Order: Leptothecata
- Family: Halopterididae
- Genus: Halopteris; Allman, 1877

= Halopteris (cnidarian) =

Genus of aquatic animals

Halopteris is a genus of cnidarians belonging to the family Halopterididae that has a cosmopolitan distribution. The genus was first described in 1877 by Irish naturalist George James Allman, and the type species is Halopteris carinata.

Species:

- Halopteris alternata (Nutting, 1900)
- Halopteris australis Galea, 2018
- Halopteris billardi (Vannucci, 1951)
- Halopteris brasiliensis Galea, 2018
- Halopteris campanula (Busk, 1852)
- Halopteris carinata Allman, 1877
- Halopteris catharina (Johnston, 1833)
- Halopteris clarkei (Nutting, 1900)
- Halopteris concava (Billard, 1911)
- Halopteris crassa (Billard, 1911)
- Halopteris diaphana (Heller, 1868)
- Halopteris diaphragmatica (Billard, 1911)
- Halopteris enersis Galea, 2006
- Halopteris everta (Mulder & Trebilcock, 1909)
- Halopteris filicina (Grateloup) Kützing, 1843
- Halopteris gemellipara Millard, 1962
- Halopteris geminata (Allman, 1877)
- Halopteris glutinosa (Lamouroux, 1816)
- Halopteris infundibulum Vervoort, 1966
- Halopteris jedani (Billard, 1913)
- Halopteris liechtensternii (Marktanner-Turneretscher, 1890)
- Halopteris longibrachia Calder & Faucci, 2021
- Halopteris millardae Galea, 2018
- Halopteris minuta (Trebilcock, 1928)
- Halopteris opposita (Mulder & Trebilcock, 1911)
- Halopteris peculiaris (Billard, 1913)
- Halopteris plagiocampa (Pictet, 1893)
- Halopteris platygonotheca Schuchert, 1997
- Halopteris plumosa Galea & Schories, 2012
- Halopteris polymorpha (Billard, 1913)
- Halopteris prominens Vervoort & Watson, 2003
- Halopteris pseudoconstricta Millard, 1975
- Halopteris rostrata Millard, 1975
- Halopteris schucherti Galea, 2006
- Halopteris simplex (Warren, 1914)
- Halopteris tenella (Verrill, 1874)
- Halopteris tuba (Kirchenpauer, 1876)
- Halopteris urceolata Watson, 2015
- Halopteris vervoorti Galea, 2008
- Halopteris violae Calder, Mallinson, Collins & Hickman, 2003
