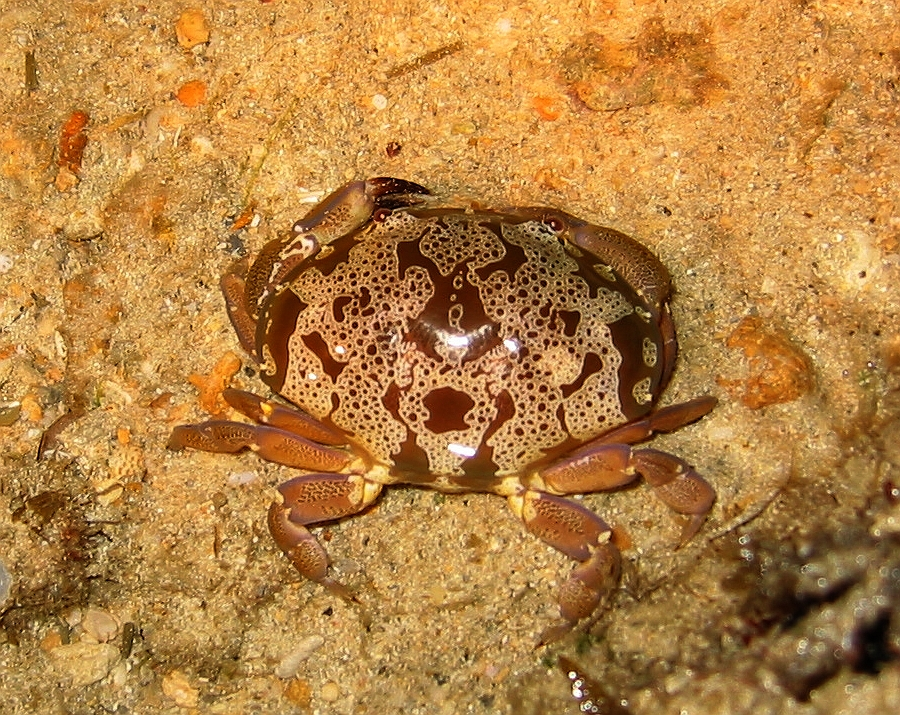

Scientific classification
- Kingdom: Animalia
- Phylum: Arthropoda
- Class: Malacostraca
- Order: Decapoda
- Suborder: Pleocyemata
- Infraorder: Brachyura
- Family: Xanthidae
- Genus: Atergatis
- Species: A. floridus

Binomial name
- Atergatis floridus (Linnaeus, 1767)

Synonyms
- Cancer floridus Linnaeus, 1767

= Atergatis floridus =

Species of crab

Atergatis floridus, the floral egg crab, green egg crab, pancake crab, or shawl crab, is a species of tropical Indo-Pacific crab from the family Xanthidae. The meat of this crab is toxic, even if cooked, and consumption often results in death.

== Description ==
Atergatis floridus has an oval, relatively narrow carapace which has a smooth surface and smooth margins. The carapace is greenish or greenish-blue-brown and is marked with a pattern which resembles lace and is made up of a fine network of fine white or yellow lines, resembling a shawl. It has large claws which are equal sizes and which are smooth with black spoon-shaped tips and which may be larger in males than females. The pereiopods are squarish in shape and quite thick with lilac edges and lack hair. The width of the carapace is 8–10 cm (3.1–3.9 in). The carapace is approximately 1.4 times broader than it is long.

== Distribution ==
Atergatis floridus occurs in the eastern Indian Ocean from south east Asia, south to Australia where it reaches Rottnest Island in Western Australia and possibly Sydney in the east, its range extends eastwards across the western pacific as far as Hawaii.

== Biology ==
Atergatis floridus is an inhabitant of the neritic zone and prefers coral and rubble. It is largely nocturnal. A. floridus is host to the isopod Gigantione hainanensis and the rhizocephalan barnacles Loxothylacus aristatus, Loxothylacus corculum, Sacculina gordonae, Sacculina robusta, Sacculina spinosa and Sacculina weberi.

== Toxicity ==
The meat of Atergatis floridus, like that of many related crab species from the family Xanthidae is toxic. The toxins are synthesised by bacteria of the genus Vibrio which live in symbiosis with the crab and the poisons are one similar to those found in puffer fish, i.e. tetrodotoxin, and also saxitoxin which is the primary toxin involved in paralytic shellfish poisoning.

== Taxonomy ==
Atergatis floridus was considered to have a wide Indo-Pacific distribution but some authorities consider that the western Indian Ocean specimens belong to a different species, Atergatis ocryoe, which was considered a junior synonym of A. floridus. A. floridus sensu stricto is found in the eastern Indian Ocean and Western Pacific.
