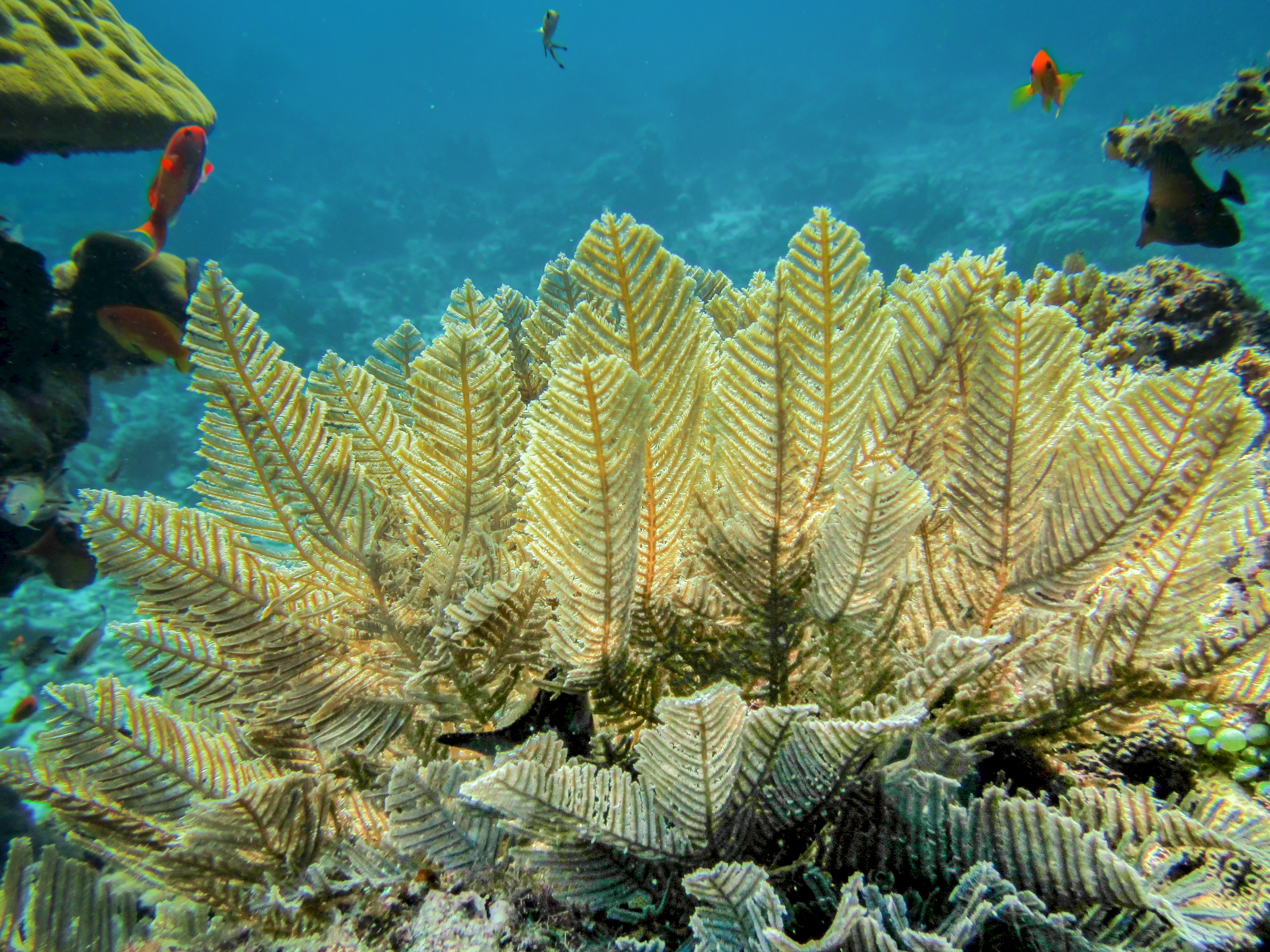
- Aglaophenia cupressina

Scientific classification
- Kingdom: Animalia
- Phylum: Cnidaria
- Class: Hydrozoa
- Order: Leptothecata
- Superfamily: Plumularioidea
- Family: Aglaopheniidae
- Genus: Aglaophenia; Lamouroux, 1812

Species
- see text

Synonyms
- Aglophenia [misspelling]; Anisocalyx Costa, 1842

= Aglaophenia =

Genus of cnidarians

Aglaophenia is a genus of colonial hydrozoans in the family Aglaopheniidae, characterized by erect, branching colonies typical of plumularioid hydroids.

== Species ==
The following species are classed in this genus:

- Aglaophenia acacia Allman, 1883
- Aglaophenia acanthocarpa Allman, 1876
- Aglaophenia amoyensis Hargitt, 1927
- Aglaophenia baggins Soto Àngel & Peña Cantero, 2017
- Aglaophenia bakeri Bale, 1919
- Aglaophenia bicornuta Nutting, 1900
- Aglaophenia billardi Bale, 1914
- Aglaophenia bilobidentata Stechow, 1908
- Aglaophenia brachiata (Lamarck, 1816)
- Aglaophenia calamus Allman, 1883
- Aglaophenia carinifera Bale, 1914
- Aglaophenia coarctata Allman, 1883
- Aglaophenia constricta Allman, 1877
- Aglaophenia ctenata (Totton, 1930)
- Aglaophenia cupressina Lamouroux, 1816
- Aglaophenia curvidens Fraser, 1937
- Aglaophenia dannevigi Bale, 1914
- Aglaophenia decumbens Bale, 1914
- Aglaophenia diegensis Torrey, 1904
- Aglaophenia difficilis Vervoort & Watson, 2003
- Aglaophenia digitulus Vervoort & Watson, 2003
- Aglaophenia dispar Fraser, 1948
- Aglaophenia divaricata (Busk, 1852)
- Aglaophenia diversidentata Fraser, 1948
- Aglaophenia dubia Nutting, 1900
- Aglaophenia elongata Meneghini, 1845
- Aglaophenia epizoica Fraser, 1948
- Aglaophenia fluxa Fraser, 1948
- Aglaophenia galatheae Kramp, 1956
- Aglaophenia harpago Schenck, 1965
- Aglaophenia holubi Leloup, 1934
- Aglaophenia hystrix Vervoort & Watson, 2003
- Aglaophenia inconspicua Torrey, 1902
- Aglaophenia indica Stechow, 1921
- Aglaophenia insignis Fewkes, 1881
- Aglaophenia integriseptata Fraser, 1948
- Aglaophenia kirchenpaueri (Heller, 1868)
- Aglaophenia latecarinata Allman, 1877
- Aglaophenia lateseptata Fraser, 1948
- Aglaophenia latirostris Nutting, 1900
- Aglaophenia laxa Allman, 1876
- Aglaophenia longicarpa Fraser, 1938
- Aglaophenia lophocarpa Allman, 1877
- Aglaophenia meganema Fraser, 1937
- Aglaophenia octocarpa Nutting, 1900
- Aglaophenia octodonta Heller, 1868
- Aglaophenia parvula Bale, 1882
- Aglaophenia phyllocarpa Bale, 1888
- Aglaophenia picardi Svoboda, 1979
- Aglaophenia pinguis Fraser, 1938
- Aglaophenia pluma (Linnaeus, 1758)
- Aglaophenia plumosa Bale, 1882
- Aglaophenia postdentata Billiard, 1913
- Aglaophenia praecisa Fraser, 1938
- Aglaophenia prominens Fraser, 1938
- Aglaophenia propingua Fraser, 1938
- Aglaophenia pseudoplumosa Watson, 1997
- Aglaophenia recherchia Watson, 2005
- Aglaophenia rhynchocarpa Allman, 1877
- Aglaophenia robusta Fewkes, 1881
- Aglaophenia septata Ritchie, 1909
- Aglaophenia sibogae Billiard, 1913
- Aglaophenia sinuosa Bale, 1888
- Aglaophenia struthionides (Murray, 1860)
- Aglaophenia subspiralis Vervoort & Watson, 2003
- Aglaophenia suensonii Jäderholm, 1896
- Aglaophenia svobodai Ansin Agis, Ramil & Vervoort, 2001
- Aglaophenia tasmanica Bale, 1914
- Aglaophenia transitionis Fraser, 1943
- Aglaophenia trifida Agassiz, 1862
- Aglaophenia triplex Fraser, 1948
- Aglaophenia triramosa Nutting, 1927
- Aglaophenia tubiformis Marktanner-Turneretscher, 1890
- Aglaophenia tubulifera (Hincks, 1861)
- Aglaophenia venusta Fraser, 1948
- Aglaophenia whiteleggei Bale, 1888
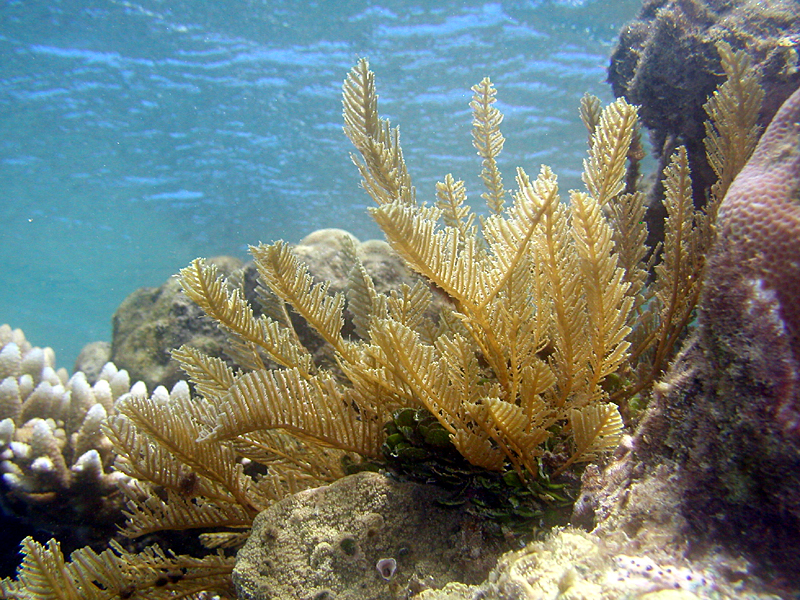
Aglaophenia cupressina

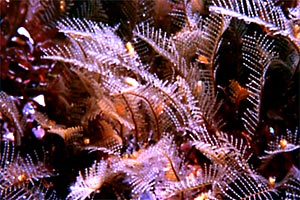
Aglaophenia pluma

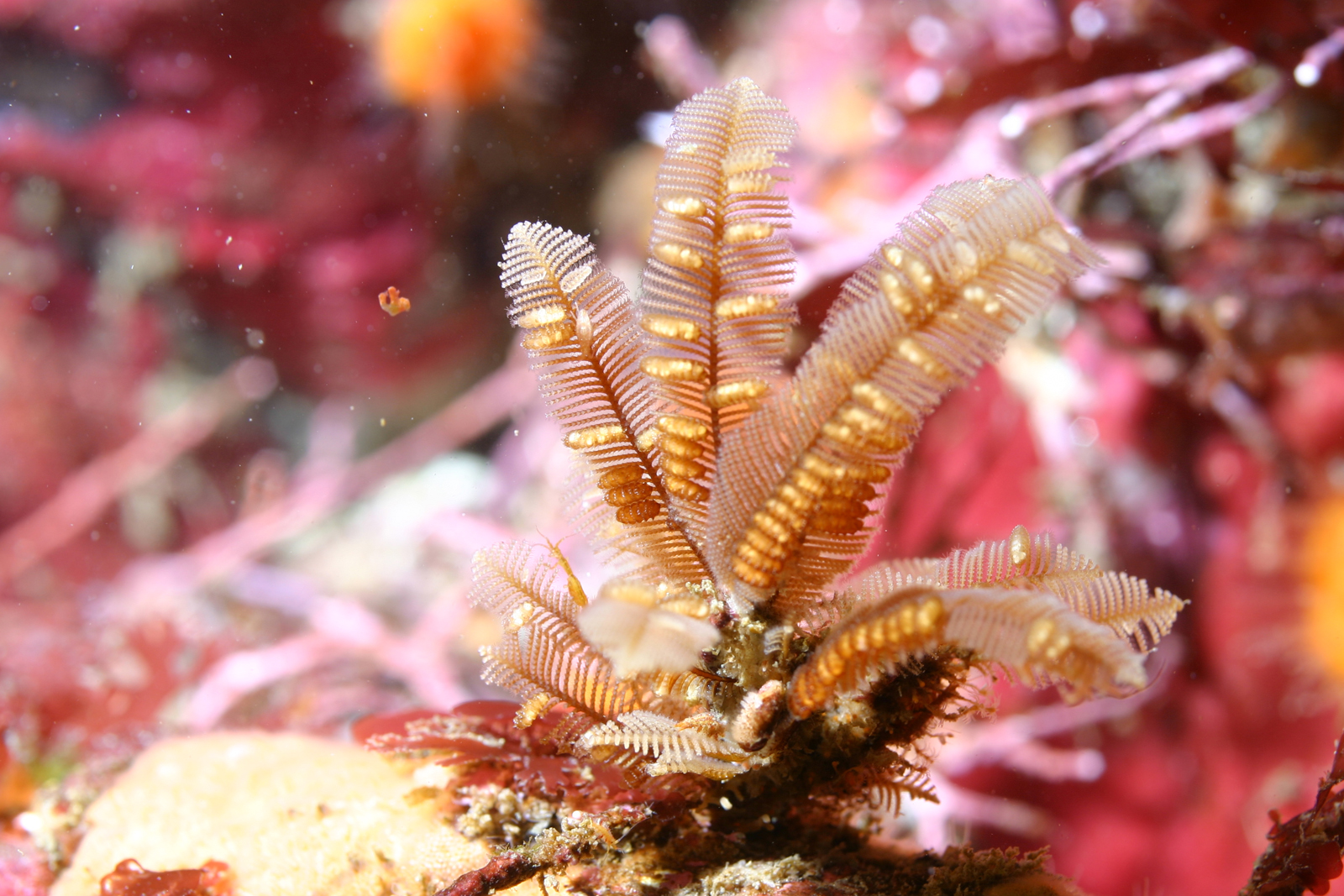
Aglaophenia struthionides

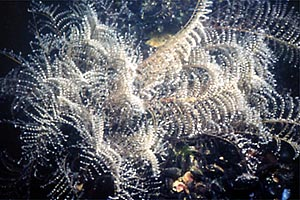
Aglaophenia septifera

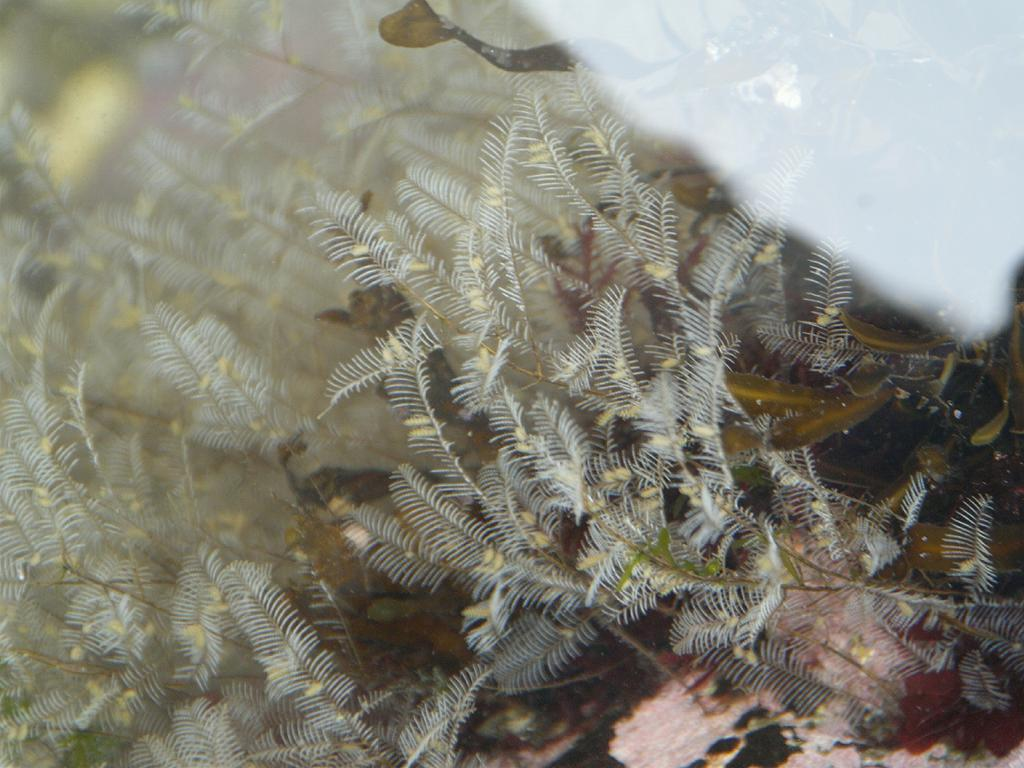
Aglaophenia whiteleggei
