= Anacepon =

Scientific classification
- Kingdom: Animalia
- Phylum: Arthropoda
- Clade: Pancrustacea
- Class: Malacostraca
- Order: Isopoda
- Family: Bopyridae
- Subfamily: Keponinae
- Genus: Anacepon; Nierstrasz & Brender à Brandis, 1931
- Species: A. sibogae

Binomial name
- Anacepon sibogae Nierstrasz & Brender à Brandis, 1931

Genus of crustaceans

Anacepon is a genus of epicaridean isopod parasites in the family Bopyridae that have been recorded off the coast of West Papua. The only species is Anacepon sibogae.

== Description ==
The adult female is about 3mm long. The head is significantly wider than long, with a very narrow anterior plate. The pereon is round, without coxal plates, and with lateral pads only visible on pereonites 3-5. The pereonites are strongly extended posterolaterally. All 5 pairs of pleonites have elongate lateral projections, which are longest on the first pleonite and decrease in length posteriorly. The lateral projections of pleonites 1-3 have finger-like projections mainly on the anterior margin, which are absent from pleonites 4-5. The first pair of pleopods have branches (or rami) smaller than the pleonite 1 lateral plate, the other pleopods have the exopod as large as the lateral plates and the endopod half as long and half as wide as the exopod. The second pair of pleopods are branched. The uropods resemble the fifth pair of pleopods. The male is unknown.

Anacepon is similar to Dactylocepon, Metacepon and Hypocepon. The former two genera have much more prominent finger-like projections on the pleonite lateral projections, while the latter genus lacks the finger-like projections entirely.

== Ecology and Distribution ==
Like other epicarideans, Anacepon sibogae is an parasite on crustaceans. As a member of Keponinae, the genus is an branchial chamber ectoparasite on Reptantia. The only recorded host for Anacepon sibogae is Parthenope sp. (as Lambrus sp.).

Anacepon sibogae has only been recorded from the type locality, which is 32m below sea level in the Selee Strait off West Papua.

== Taxonomy ==
Anacepon was originally placed in the subfamily Ioninae, but was moved to the new subfamily Keponinae when the type genus Ioninae, Ione, was moved to its own family in 2013.
