= Dactyl =

Dactyl may refer to:

- Dactyl (mythology), a legendary being
- Dactyl (poetry), a metrical unit of verse
- Dactyl Foundation, an arts organization
- Finger, a part of the hand also known as a "dactyl".
- Dactylus, part of a decapod crustacean
- "-dactyl", a suffix used in taxonomy
- Dactyl (moon), a moon of asteroid 243 Ida

== See also ==
- Daktylos, an Ancient Greek unit of length
