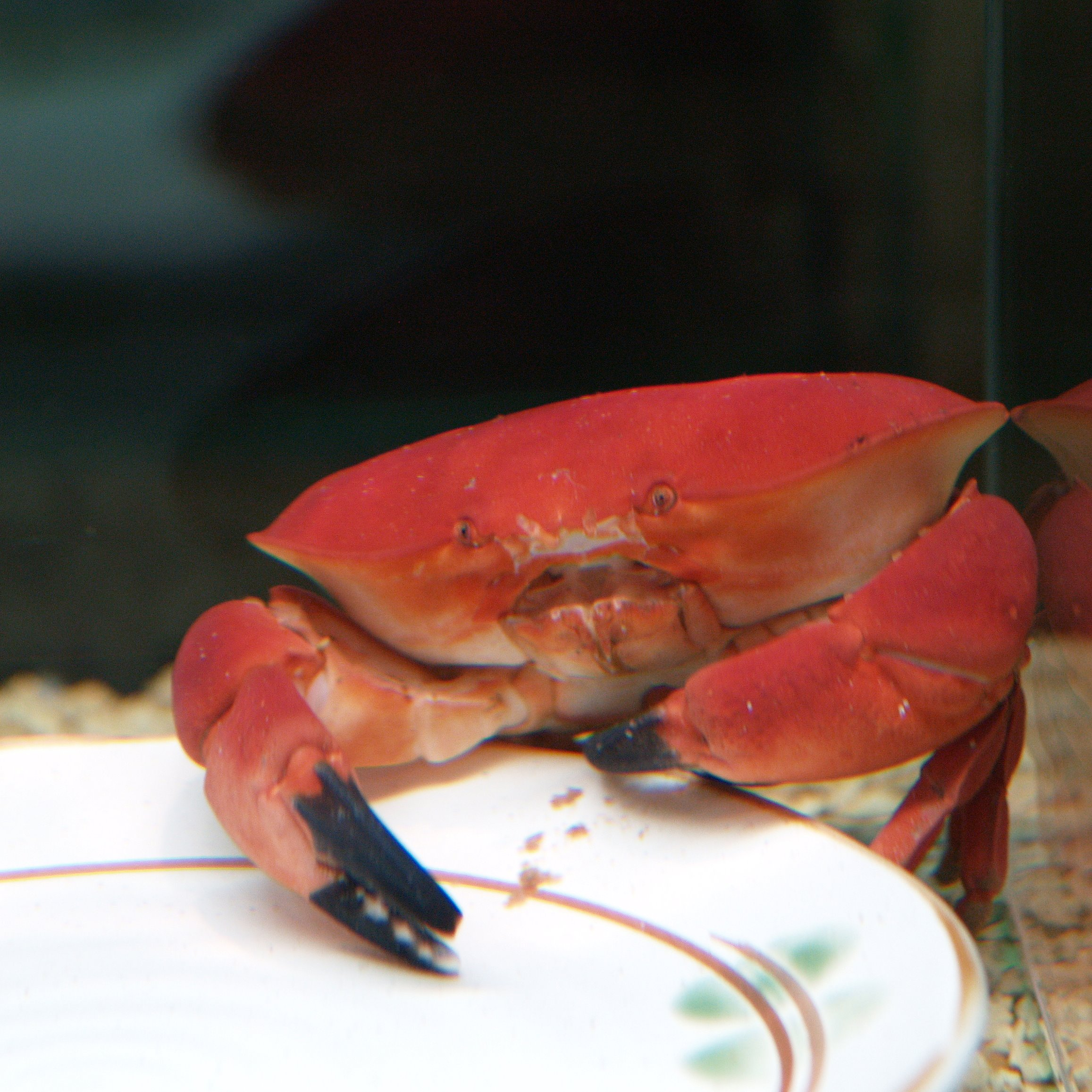

Scientific classification
- Kingdom: Animalia
- Phylum: Arthropoda
- Clade: Pancrustacea
- Class: Malacostraca
- Order: Decapoda
- Suborder: Pleocyemata
- Infraorder: Brachyura
- Family: Xanthidae
- Genus: Atergatis
- Species: A. subdentatus

Binomial name
- Atergatis subdentatus (de Haan, 1835)

Synonyms
- Cancer (Atergatis) subdentatus De Haan, 1835

= Atergatis subdentatus =

Species of crab

Atergatis subdentatus, also known as the red reef crab, dark-finger coral crab or eyed coral crab, is a species of crab in the family Xanthidae.

== Description ==
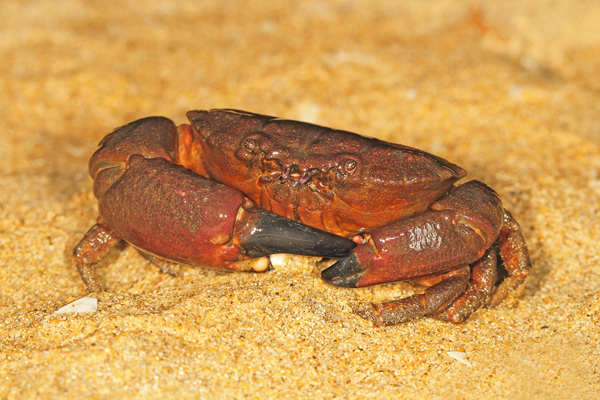
Atergatis subdentatus from Karwar, India.

Atergatis subdentatus has a compact shape, and may appear either uniform crimson in colour, or may have an irregularly mottled yellow on a crimson background. It has a broadly subquadrilateral carapace which grows to about 90 millimetres (3.5 in) wide, and has finely punctulated by the anterior and antero-lateral borders. It normally has an orange spot in the centre of the carapace, often with two small, white 'eyes' within.

The arms have a flattish inner surface with two, inward-pointing teeth. Beside the teeth are brush-like hairs grouped together in four or five bundles.

== Distribution ==
The type locality for this species is Japan, and it can be found around many of the Japanese islands. It also occurs in the waters of Taiwan, Singapore, and rarely in the Lakshadweep Islands and Gulf of Mannar.

== Habitat ==
This species lives on coral reefs and rocky beaches at a range of 3–30 m (10–100 ft) in depth.
