= Branchial =

Branchial may refer to:

- Branchial apparatus, an embryological structure.
- Branchial arch a series of bony "loops" present in fish, which support the gills.
- Branchial artery, also known as aortic arches.
- Branchial cleft
- Branchial cleft cyst, failure of obliteration of the second branchial cleft in embryonic development.
- Branchial efferent, also known as special visceral efferent.
- Branchial heart
- Branchial membrane
- Branchial plexus
- Branchial pouches, also known as pharyngeal pouches.
- First and second branchial arch syndrome, also known as hemifacial microsomia.
- Ultimo-branchial bodies, also known as ultimopharyngeal body.
