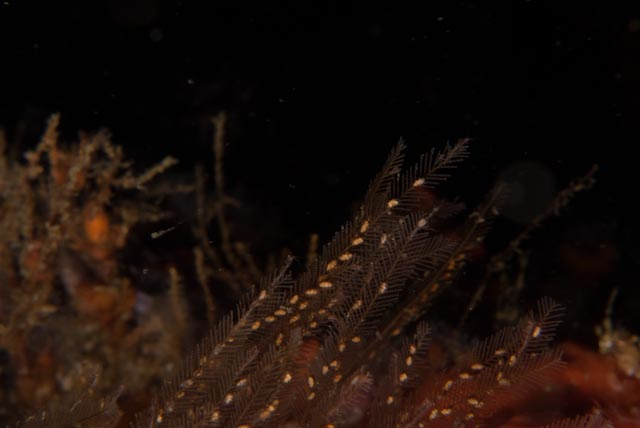
- Corhiza scotiae

Scientific classification
- Kingdom: Animalia
- Phylum: Cnidaria
- Class: Hydrozoa
- Order: Leptothecata
- Superfamily: Plumularioidea
- Family: Halopterididae; Millard, 1962

Genera
- See text

= Halopterididae =

Family of cnidarians

Halopterididae is a family of hydrozoans.

According to the World Register of Marine Species, the following genera belong to the family Halopterididae:

- Anarthroclada Naumov, 1955
- Antennella Allman, 1877
- Antennellopsis Jäderholm, 1896
- Astrolabia Naumov, 1955
- Calvinia Nutting, 1900
- Cladoplumaria Ansin Agis, Ramil & Vervoort, 2004
- Corhiza Millard, 1962
- Diplopteroides Peña Cantero & Vervoort, 1999
- Gattya Allman, 1885
- Halopteris Allman, 1877
- Monostaechas Allman, 1877
- Nuditheca Nutting, 1900
- Pentatheca Naumov, 1955
- Polyplumaria Sars, 1874
