= Bopyridae =

Scientific classification
- Kingdom: Animalia
- Phylum: Arthropoda
- Clade: Pancrustacea
- Class: Malacostraca
- Order: Isopoda
- Suborder: Epicaridea
- Superfamily: Bopyroidea
- Family: Bopyridae; Rafinesque, 1815

Family of crustaceans

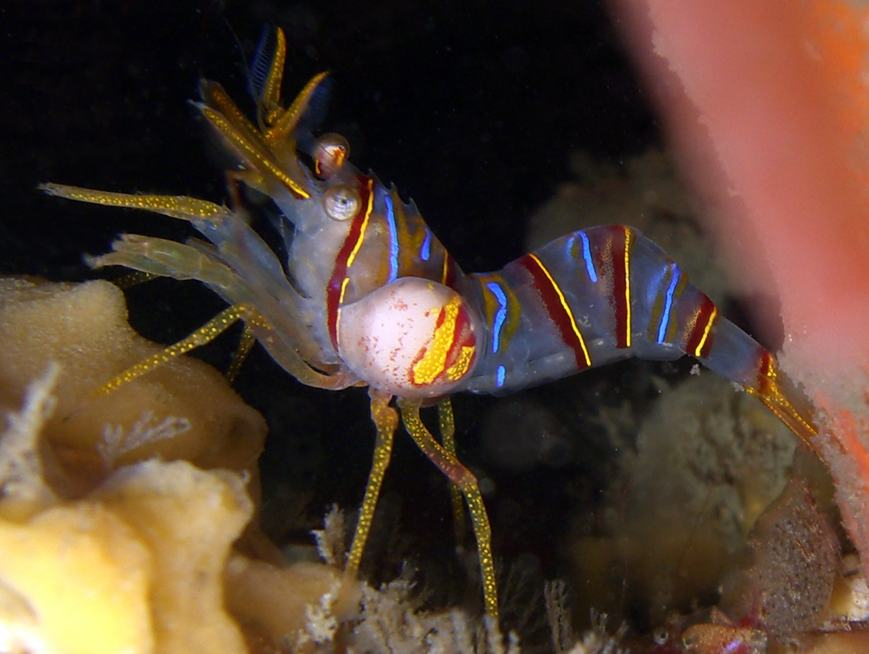
Shrimp displaying bulge indicating bopyrid parasitism

The Bopyridae are a family of isopod crustaceans in the suborder Epicaridea. Members of the family are ectoparasites of crabs and shrimp. They live in the gill cavities or under the carapace where they cause a noticeable swelling. Fossil crustaceans have occasionally been observed to have a similar characteristic bulge.

== Subfamilies and genera ==
Bopyridae contains 671 accepted species in 173 valid genera, which in turn are organized into 10 subfamilies.

Argeiinae Markham, 1977

- Argeia Dana, 1853
- Argeiopsis Kensley, 1974
- Bopyrosa Nierstrasz & Brender à Brandis, 1923
- Eragia Markham, 1994
- Gareia Bourdon & Bruce, 1983
- Paraeragia An, Zhang & Paulay, 2017
- Parargeia Hansen, 1897
- Stegoalpheon Chopra, 1923
- Stegoargeia An, Boyko & Li, 2015

Athelginae Codreanu & Codreanu, 1956

- Allathelges Kazmi & Markham, 1999
- Anathelges Bonnier, 1900
- Athelges Gerstaeker, 1862
- Claustrathelges Williams & Boyko, 2016
- Falsanathelges Boyko & Williams, 2003
- Minimathelges Boyko & Williams, 2003
- Parathelges Bonnier, 1900
- Pseudostegias Shiino, 1933
- Stegias Richardson, 1904

Bathygyginae Markham, 2016

- Bathygyge Hansen, 1897

Bopyrinae Rafinesque, 1815

- Allobopyrus Bourdon, 1983
- Bopyrella Bonnier, 1900
- Bopyrina Kossmann, 1881
- Bopyrinella Nierstrasz & Brender à Brandis, 1925
- Bopyrinina Shiino, 1933
- Bopyrione Bourdon & Markham, 1980
- Bopyroides Stimpson, 1864
- Bopyrus Latreille, 1802
- Capitetragonia Pearse, 1953
- Discorsobopyrus Boyko, 2004
- Litobopyrus Markham, 1982
- Ogyridione Markham, 1988
- Ovobopyrus Markham, 1985
- Palaemonellione Markham, 1989
- Parabopyrella Markham, 1985
- Parabopyriscus Markham, 1985
- Parabopyrus Shiino, 1934
- Parapleurocrypta Chopra, 1923
- Probopyrinella Nierstrasz & Brender à Brandis, 1929
- Probopyrione Bourdon, 1983
- Probopyriscus Markham, 1982
- Probopyrus Giard & Bonnier, 1888
- Probynia Bourdon & Bruce, 1983
- Schizobopyrina Markham, 1985
- Septembopyrina An, Boyko & Li, 2015
- Synsynella Hay, 1917
- Urobopyrus Richardson, 1904

Hemiarthrinae Markham, 1972

- Alaxphryxus Boyko & Williams, 2026
- Allodiplophryxus Markham, 1985
- Anchiarthrus Markham, 1992
- Anisarthrus Giard, 1907
- Anomophryxus Shiino, 1937
- Apophrixus Nierstrasz & Brender à Brandis, 1931
- Azygopleon Markham, 1985
- Cataphryxus Shiino, 1936
- Dicropleon Markham, 1972
- Diplophryxus Richardson, 1904
- Eophrixus Caroli, 1930
- Epiphrixus Nierstraz & Brender à Brandis, 1932
- Eriphrixus Markham, 1990
- Filophryxus Bruce, 1972
- Hemiarthrus Giard & Bonnier, 1887
- Hemiphryxus Bruce, 1978
- Hyperphrixus Nierstrasz & Brender à Brandis, 1931
- Hypohyperphrixus Nierstrasz & Brender à Brandis, 1932
- Izuohshimaphryxus Saito, 2015
- Loki Markham, 1972
- Mediophrixus Markham, 1990
- Mesophryxus Bruce, 1973
- Metaphrixus Nierstrasz & Brender à Brandis, 1931
- Micropodiphryxus Boyko, 2012
- Miophrixus Barnard, 1955
- Neophryxus Bruce, 2007
- Orophryxus Bruce, 1972
- Pliophrixus Caroli, 1930
- Quadripediphryxus Saito, 2020
- Sigyn An, Boyko & Li, 2015

Keponinae Boyko, Moss, Williams & Shields, 2013

- Allokepon Markham, 1982
- Anacepon Nierstrasz & Brender à Brandis, 1931
- Apocepon Nierstrasz & Brender à Brandis, 1930
- Atypocepon Nierstrasz & Brender à Brandis, 1931
- Cancricepon Giard & Bonnier, 1887
- Cardiocepon Nobili, 1906
- Castrione Lima, 1980
- Coxalione Bourdon, 1977
- Dactylokepon Stebbing, 1910
- Ergyne Risso, 1816
- Grapsicepon Giard & Bonnier, 1887
- Hemicepon Lemos de Castro & Brasil-Lima, 1980
- Heterocepon Shiino, 1936
- Hypercepon Danforth, 1972
- Hypocepon Nierstrasz & Brender à Brandis, 1930
- Kepon Duvernoy, 1840
- Leidya Cornalia & Panceri, 1861
- Megacepon George, 1947
- Mesocepon Shiino, 1951
- Metacepon Nierstrasz & Brender à Brandis, 1931
- Metathelges Nierstrasz & Brender à Brandis, 1923
- Onkokepon An, Yu & Li, 2006
- Onychocepon Pérez, 1921
- Paracepon Nierstrasz & Brender à Brandis, 1931
- Procepon Shiino, 1937
- Rhizophoracepon Shiino, 1937
- Scyracepon Tattersall, 1905
- Trapezicepon Bonnier, 1900
- Tylokepon Stebbing, 1904

Orbioninae Codreanu, 1967

- Anisorbione Bourdon, 1981
- Aparapenaeon An, Yin, Chen, Boyko & Liu, 2022
- Asymmetrorbione Boyko, 2003
- Epipenaeon Nobili, 1906
- Minicopenaeon Bourdon, 1981
- Orbione Bonnier, 1900
- Parapenaeon Richardson, 1904
- Parapenaeonella Shiino, 1949
- Parasymmetrorbione An, Boyko & Li, 2013
- Parione Richardson, 1910

Phyllodurinae Markham, 1977

- Phyllodurus Stimpson, 1857

Pleurocryptellinae Williams & Boyko in Williams, Boyko & Stewart, 2024

- Pagurocryptella Boyko & Williams, 2010
- Paragigantione Barnard, 1920
- Parapleurocryptella Bourdon, 1972
- Pleurocryptella Bonnier, 1900
- Pleurocryptina Nierstrasz & Brender à Brandis, 1929

Pseudioninae Codreanu, 1967

- Acrobelione Bourdon, 1981
- Albunione Markham & Boyko, 1999
- Allorbimorphus Bourdon, 1976
- Anuropodione Bourdon, 1967
- Aporobopyrina Shiino, 1934
- Aporobopyroides Nobili, 1906
- Aporobopyrus Nobili, 1906
- Astalione Markham, 1975
- Asymmetrione Codreanu, Codreanu & Pike, 1965
- Balanopleon Markham, 1974
- Bathione Román-Contreras & Boyko, 2007
- Bopyrissa Nierstrasz & Brender à Brandis, 1931
- Bopyrophryxus Codreanu, 1965
- Carcinione Bourdon, 1983
- Cryptione Hansen, 1897
- Discomorphus Markham, 2008
- Eremitione Williams & Boyko in Williams, Boyko & Madad, 2019
- Galathocrypta Román-Contreras & Soto, 2002
- Gigantione Kossmann, 1881
- Goleathopseudione Román-Contreras, 2008
- Gyge Cornalia & Panceri, 1861
- Ionella Bonnier, 1900
- Kolourione Markham, 1978
- Munidion Hansen, 1897
- Nikione Kensley, 1974
- Orbimorphus Richardson, 1910
- Orthione Markham, 1988
- Ovoionella Boyko, 2004
- Pagurion Shiino, 1933
- Paguristione An, Zhao & Markham, 2016
- Paranikione An, Boyko & Li, 2015
- Parapagurion Shiino, 1933
- Parasymmetrione An, Markham & Yu, 2010
- Parione Richardson, 1910
- Parionella Nierstrasz & Brender à Brandis, 1923
- Parionina Nierstrasz & Brender à Brandis, 1929
- Parioninella Nierstrasz & Brender à Brandis, 1930
- Pauperella Nierstrasz & Brender à Brandis, 1929
- Pleonobopyrus Saito & Moritaki, 2020
- Pleurocrypta Hesse, 1865
- Pontobopyrus Markham, 1979
- Progebiophilus Codreanu & Codreanu, 1963
- Propseudione Shiino, 1933
- Pseudione Kossmann, 1881
- Pseudionella Shiino, 1949
- Rhopalione Pérez, 1920
- Robinione Boyko, Williams & Shields, 2017
- Shiinoella Bourdon, 1972
- Spathione Boyko & van der Meij, 2018
- Upogebione Markham, 1985
- Upogebiophilus Nobili, 1906
- Zeaione Boyko & Williams, 2025 in Andrade, Boyko, Brandt, Buge, Davíla Jiménez, Henseler, Hernández Alcántara, Jóźwiak, Knauber, Machado, Martínez-Muñoz, Momtazi, Nakadera, Qiu, Riehl, Rouse, Sigwart, Sirenko, Souza-Filho, Steger, Stępień, Tilic, Trautwein, Vončina, Williams & Zhang, 2025

The subfamilies of Bopyridae are characterized by traits present in mature adults. The genus Cryptobopyrus, which was described off a single cryptoniscus larva from the Southern Ocean, can not be placed to past family. The subfamilies Entophilinae Richardson, 1903 (containing the genus Entophilus Richardson, 1903) and Ioninae H. Milne Edwards, 1840 (containing the genus Ione Latreille, 1818), has been raised to family level, with the former being moved to the superfamily Cryptoniscoidea.
