= Frank Zappa in popular culture =

As an icon of counterculture and underground rock the American rock musician and composer Frank Zappa has been featured and referenced in various different media.

== Artworks ==
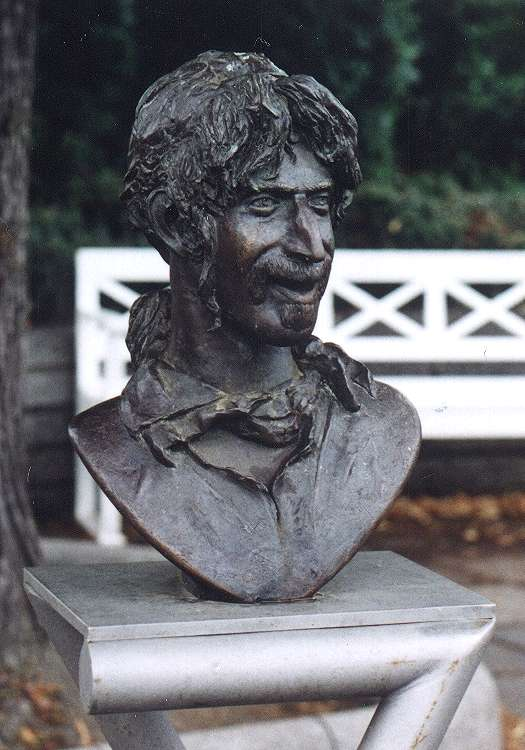
Frank Zappa statue by Vaclav Cesak in Bad Doberan, Germany

- In 1995 a cast of Zappa was installed in the center of Vilnius, the capital of Lithuania. Zappa was immortalized by Konstantinas Bogdanas, the Lithuanian sculptor who had previously cast portraits of Vladimir Lenin.
- In 2002, a bronze bust was installed in a square in Bad Doberan, a small town in the north of Germany, where, since 1990, there has been an annual international festival celebrating the music of Frank Zappa, the "Zappanale".
- In 2008 a cast of Zappa was installed in Baltimore created by Konstantinas Bogdanas, the Lithuanian sculptor.
- The Tokyo Tower Wax Museum, which closed down in 2013, featured a permanent exhibition about rock music and had a wax statue of Zappa.
- Actor Billy Bob Thornton made illustrated portraits of Zappa.

== Comics and cartoons ==
- Zappa's official illustrator Cal Schenkel made various advertising comics to promote Zappa's latest records.
- In Marcel Gotlib's comics series Hamster Jovial the title character listen to 200 Motels and questions the lyrics of the song Penis Dimension. The cartoonist frequently referenced Zappa in other comics too.
- A September 1970 issue of National Lampoon featured a parody of Archie Comics in which teenagers go to a Zappa concert. The artwork was provided by Michael Choquett, Sean Kelly, Joe Orlando, Henry Scarpelli and Peter Bramley.
- A 1972 interview with Frank Zappa for Punch Magazine featured a caricature of the musician by Quentin Blake.
- Belgian cartoonist Kamagurka once drew a comic strip for Zappa, but left the speech balloons open. After meeting him backstage he let Zappa fill in the text of this comic, named Zappa In Zoeloeland (1977). The comic strip was later published in Humo.
- Gerrit de Jager referenced the album cover of Chunga's Revenge in a drawing featuring the letter "Z" in Kees Kousemaker's Stripleksikon (1980).
- Zappa has a cameo in Hector Leemans's Bakelandt comic book album Het Verraad van de Repensnijder (1979).
- One of Luc Cromheecke's earliest comics featured Zap, a motorcyclist who looked like Zappa.
- In the satirical comic book Pest In 't Paleis (1983) by Guido van Meir and Jan Bosschaert a group of Belgian politicians gather around the musical drum from the front cover of We're Only In It For The Money.
- Mimi Pond made a comic book based on Zappa's novelty song Valley Girl.
- Zappa was referenced in Bill Griffith's Zippy the Pinhead.
- Frank Zappa had cameos in the Belgian comics series The Adventures of Nero by Marc Sleen, namely the albums De Zwarte Toren (1983), Het Beest Zonder Naam (1985) and Doe De Petoe (1994).
- After Zappa's passing Matt Groening created a tribute in his comic strip Life in Hell.
- Robert Crumb created a caricature of Zappa for The New Yorker.
- In 1994 German cartoonist Wittek made a comic book album based on Zappa's Joe's Garage.
- Dutch comics artist Peter Pontiac illustrated bootleg copies of book with Zappa's lyrics.
- Belgian cartoonist Wegé often adds cameos of Zappa in his cartoons.
- British cartoonist Chuck Death invented crazy stories about Zappa in his Great Pop Things comics series.
- Jean Solé created a 1975 comic strip about Zappa's song Stinkfoot, which was published in Fluide Glacial and later used as the cover of Zappa's bootleg album ' 'Tis The Season To Be Jelly.
- In 2012 a compilation album was released, Frank Zappa Comics Tribute, featured comics starring Zappa.
- Belgian cartoonist Karl Meersman drew two caricatures of Zappa.
- In 2005 "Zappaesk" (Eine Hommage an die Mutter der Erfindung) by Andreas Rausch was released by the Ehapa Comic Collection, Cologne. Since 2023 an updated English Version of the 240 pages book, with more illustrations and original coloured pages was made available as an E-Book.

== Film ==
- Zappa wrote the soundtrack for the B-movies The World's Greatest Sinner (1961) and the western Run Home Slow (1963).
- Frank Zappa appeared in the 1968 film Head (1968) which stars the Monkees. He is in the presence of a talking cow and tells Davy Jones to focus more on the band's music, because the youth of America depends on you to show the way.
- Joel and Ethan Coen's first amateur movie, The Banana Film, featured a man eating a banana, set to music from Zappa's Hot Rats.
- Music from Freak Out! and We're Only In It For The Money appears on the soundtrack of Haskell Wexler's Medium Cool (1969).
- Frank Zappa made a satirical film, 200 Motels (1971), which is about him and his band The Mothers of Invention, but nevertheless only features him in minor footage.
- A photographic cut-out of Zappa appears in the sky in Down and Dirty Duck (1973), an animated film which features the voices of Howard Kaylan, Mark Volman, Aynsley Dunbar and Janet Ferguson, who all appeared in 200 Motels too, as part of Zappa's entourage.
- Frank Zappa is prominently featured in the concert film Baby Snakes (1979).
- Zappa's compositions Chunga's Revenge and I Have Been In You are featured on the soundtrack of Happy Together.
- Zappa's song "Dirty Love" is featured on the soundtrack of the film The Ice Storm. and Le Péril jeune.
- Zappa's Watermelon in Easter Hay plays over the closing credits of Y Tu Mamá También (2001).
- In the film The Banger Sisters (2002) the title characters claim to have gained their nickname from Frank Zappa.
- Frank Zappa is portrayed by Adam Tomei in My Dinner with Jimi (2003) by Bill Fishman.

== Literature ==
- Belgian cult poet Jotie T'Hooft wrote reviews and essays about Zappa's music, which have been posthumously compiled in book format.
- Rosemarie Heinikel describes an affair with Zappa in her book Rosy Rosy.
- In Irvine Welsh's Trainspotting frequent references to Zappa songs are made.
- The book cover of Joel Hodgson's 198 Movies parodies the film poster of 200 Motels.
- The 2011 book Freak Out! My Life with Frank Zappa by Pauline Butcher describes her experience working as Zappa's secretary.

== Magazines ==
- Chief editor Guy Mortier of the Flemish magazine Humo shared a physical resemblance to Zappa, which was a running gag in its pages for decades. They even joked about it when they interviewed Zappa for their publication.

== Music ==
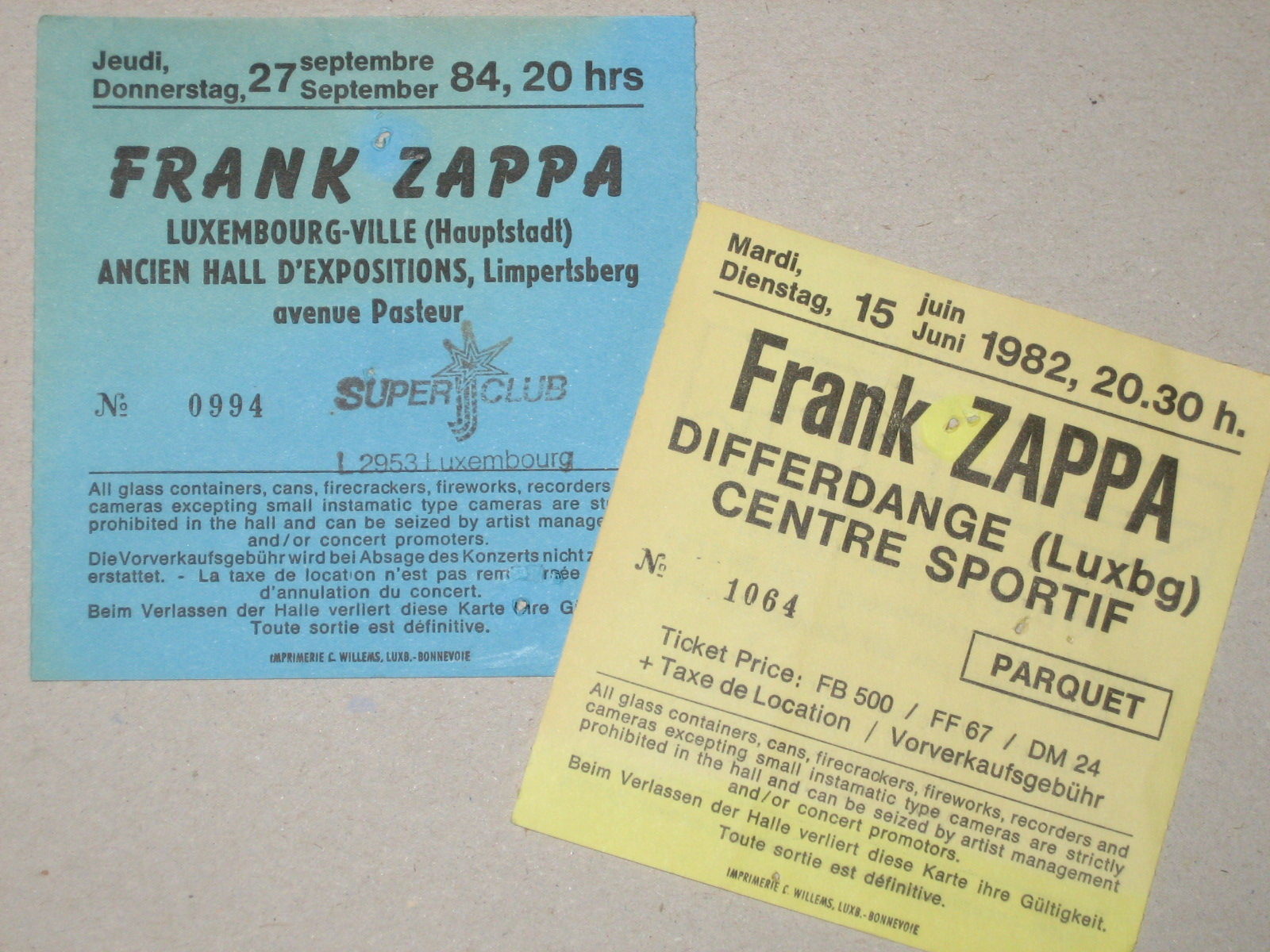
Frank Zappa concert ticket-stubs, 1982 & 1984

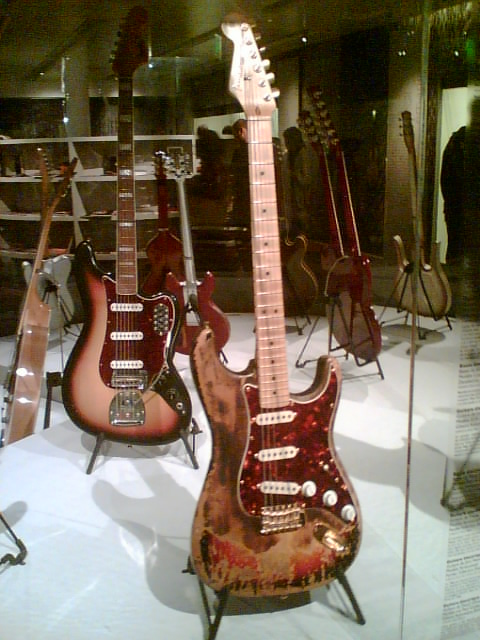
The Burnt Hendrix Strat. Burned by Jimi Hendrix, 1968. Later restored by Frank Zappa

- Paul McCartney claimed that Zappa's debut Freak Out! was an important influence on the Beatles album Sgt. Pepper's Lonely Hearts Club Band (1967).
- The Czech underground rock band The Plastic People of the Universe were named after Zappa's song Plastic People.
- The Japanese rock band Zunou Keisatsu took their name from the Zappa song Who Are the Brain Police?, which literally translates to brain police.
- Kurt Cobain used musical pieces by Zappa in his experimental collage tape recording Montage of Heck.
- "Frank Zappa and the Mothers" are mentioned in the lyrics of the well known Deep Purple track "Smoke on the Water", which is about the 1971 Montreux, Switzerland fire at a Zappa concert.
- John Mayall's song 2401 deals with a visit he once paid to Zappa in his log cabin in Laurel Canyon Boulevard.
- Supergrass' second album In It for the Money was named after We're Only In It For The Money.
- Los Lobos named their album Just Another Band from East L.A. - A Collection after Zappa's Just Another Band From L.A..
- Wild Man Fischer, who once recorded in Frank Zappa's studio, later had a falling-out with him. He recorded two songs about him afterwards, one named "Frank", the other "I'm Sorry, Frank Zappa".
- On their album Mondo Bizarro, The Ramones mention Zappa in "Censorshit", a song about the PMRC hearings.
- The cover of Spanish musician Caballero Reynaldo's record Clásico Con Twist (1995) is a shout-out to Zappa's Joe's Garage.
- George Thorogood & The Destroyers covered The Mothers' song "Trouble Every Day" on their 1997 album Rockin' My Life Away. The song is dedicated to Zappa in the liner notes.
- Weird Al Yankovic's song Genius In France from Poodle Hat (2003) is a tribute to Zappa and features Zappa's son Dweezil on guitar and vocals.
- Gov't Mule recorded a song entitled "Left Coast Groovies (For FZ)", included on their debut album released in 1995. The introductory riff is followed by a voice in the background saying "what the fuck", a frequent expression of Zappa's. The song was often introduced in concert with a monologue about Zappa, concluding with the band telling audience members "If you don't like Frank Zappa, get the fuck out".
- On the album cover of Madlib's The Further Adventures of Lord Quas (2005) references are made to Freak Out! and An Evening with Wild Man Fischer.
- The song Orbz a.k.a. Some Wise Quote Drake Never Said by Mr. Muthafuckin' eXquire samples a quote by Zappa about the American educational system.

== Music videos ==
- Concert footage of Zappa is featured in Window in the Skies by U2.
- Zappa is featured in the music video Гарсон No. 2 by Boris Grebenshchikov.

== Television ==
- Zappa made an appearance on The Steve Allen Show in 1963. This appearance featured Frank demonstrating the wide scope of percussion by playing the spokes of a spinning bicycle wheel with drum sticks.
- Zappa appeared on an episode of the Monkees' TV series entitled "The Monkees Blow Their Minds" (air date: 3/11/68). Here, he was shown "playing" a car by beating it into submission. This is done in a Monkees-style montage to the Zappa song "Mother People" after being interviewed by Monkee Michael Nesmith. Zappa agreed to appear on the show provided he could "be" Nesmith; Nesmith, in turn, liked the idea, so long as he could "be" Zappa. The two wore cheap, exaggerated disguises and the interview was performed as if Mike was Frank and Frank was Mike, in a manner analogous to Ringo Starr's appearance as "Larry the Dwarf, dressed up like Frank Zappa" in 200 Motels.
- His composition The Big Squeeze, which can be found on The Lost Episodes, was specifically written for a Luden's Cough Drops TV commercial.
- Zappa's music was used set to bizarre imagery in the experimental and highly controversial Dutch TV show Hoepla in 1967.
- Zappa was subject of a documentary by Dutch documentary maker Roelof Kiers, simply named Frank Zappa. After being broadcast on 11 February 1971 it led to controversy among viewers and questions asked in the Tweede Kamer.
- He appeared on What's My Line? on 23 September 1971, during the show's syndicated run, as a mystery guest.
- Zappa appeared on "The Mike Douglas Show", 28 October 1976. He is interviewed and performs one instrumental selection on guitar. His segment last approximately 17 minutes. Also present are J.J. Walker and Kenny Rogers.
- Zappa was the host and musical guest of a Season Four episode of Saturday Night Live in October 1978. He portrayed Connie Conehead's date. He was also part of another skit, entitled "Night of Freak Mountain", in which Zappa met with a couple of hippies who offered various drugs to him, which he declined, stating "I don't do drugs." The hippies regarded his statement in awe and surprise. As part of the musical performance of "I'm the Slime" (on an earlier episode hosted by Candice Bergen), the transparent screen of a fake television monitor fills up with a slimy green goo.
- Zappa appeared in a 1979 episode of the game show Make Me Laugh.
- In 1981 Zappa made a music video, You Are What You Is, which featured U.S. President Ronald Reagan on the electric chair. In the 1994 Beavis and Butt-Head episode Canoe Beavis and Butt-head come across this music video while channel surfing and instantly switch the channel because it sucks so much. In an interview Mike Judge claimed that many Zappa fans were mad at him, but he did it as a tribute to Zappa who claimed in an interview that he liked the show.
- He played Attilla the Hunchback in Shelley Duvall's Faerie Tale Theatre, in the episode titled "The Boy Who Left Home to Find Out About the Shivers" (1984).
- Zappa makes an appearance on talk show School Beat on Independent station KHJ-TV in Los Angeles in 1986.
- He played drug dealer Mario Fuente in episode 19 of season 2, "Payback" of the TV show Miami Vice first broadcast 14 March 1986.
- Zappa made a 1992 TV commercial for General Electric in which he tells viewers to not buy the company's products.
- Zappa was the voice of the Pope in the 1992 Ren & Stimpy episode "Powdered Toast Man".
- Zappa is one of several celebrity composers interviewed in The Revenge of the Dead Indians (1992), a documentary about John Cage.
- In the cult TV series Mystery Science Theater 3000 the show's creators frequently referenced Zappa, because they were huge fans. Zappa too loved the show and tried to collaborate with the staff to adapt one of his musical scripts, Hunchentoot, into a film. Zappa's death prevented it from ever being produced. In the week of his passing an episode was dedicated to him.
- Music from Zappa's background catalogue was featured prominently in the first season of the satirical animated TV series Duckman (1994). He died before the pilot episode aired, but it was dedicated to him. Zappa's son, Dweezil Zappa performed the voice of Ajax in the series.
- In the Daria episode That Was Then, This Is Dumb characters are listening to Weasels Ripped My Flesh.
- Zappa's face can be seen on a magazine cover in The Simpsons episode A Midsummer's Nice Dream.
- In the episode Dream Date With Lumpy Space Princess of Adventure Time, Johnny picks out a copy of Zappa's record Apostrophe (').Moon Unit Zappa, Zappa's daughter tweeted about it on her Twitter page.
- Roseanne Season 6 Episode 14 "Busted" aired in January 1994 right after Frank's death. Ahmet Zappa plays the roommate of Becky's estranged husband Mark. In the apartment they share are three Frank Zappa posters on the walls: "Man from Utopia" "Them or Us" "No D Glasses". There appears to be a bust of Frank on the dresser. After the credits roll, a full screen "F. Z. R. I. P." appears.
- In April 2002, VH1 aired the made-for-television film "Warning: Parental Advisory," which chronicled the formation of the Parents Music Resource Center and the events leading up to the Senate hearing in 1985, of where which Frank Zappa, Dee Snider, and John Denver testified against government-led censorship. In the TV film, Zappa was portrayed by Griffin Dunne.

== Video games ==
- A playable character from the video game Guilty Gear XX, Zappa, is named after Frank Zappa.
- The main character of the 2013 video game Killer Is Dead, Mondo Zappa, is also named after Frank Zappa.
- The Dynamo enemies in Stargate_(1981_video_game) by Eugene_Jarvis break up into several Space Hums, homage to "Dinah-Moe Humm" from Over-Nite_Sensation.

== Astronomy ==
- After Zappa's death, an internet campaign to the International Astronomical Union's Minor Planet Center led to an asteroid being named in his honor: 3834 Zappafrank, the asteroid having been discovered by Czech astronomers in 1980.

== Biology ==
In the 1980s, biologist Ed Murdy named a genus of gobiid fishes of New Guinea Zappa after Zappa, stating that he liked "his music... his politics and principles" and that "the name itself is a good one for scientific nomenclature."

Biologist Ferdinando Boero named a phialellid jellyfish Phialella zappai in order to get the chance to meet the musician. A Zappa concert in Genoa focused largely on the jellyfish and on Dr. Boero. A small portion of this concert was released on You Can't Do That On Stage Anymore: Vol. 6 as "Lonesome Cowboy Nando". Zappa stated, "There is nothing I'd like better than to have a jellyfish named after me."

Other species named after Zappa include a fossil snail named Amaurotoma zappa and the Cameroonese spider Pachygnatha zappa, so named because a marking on the female's ventral surface resembles the Zappa mustache. A gene of the bacterium Proteus mirabilis that causes urinary tract infection is named zapA (others are named zapB through zapE).

== Geography ==
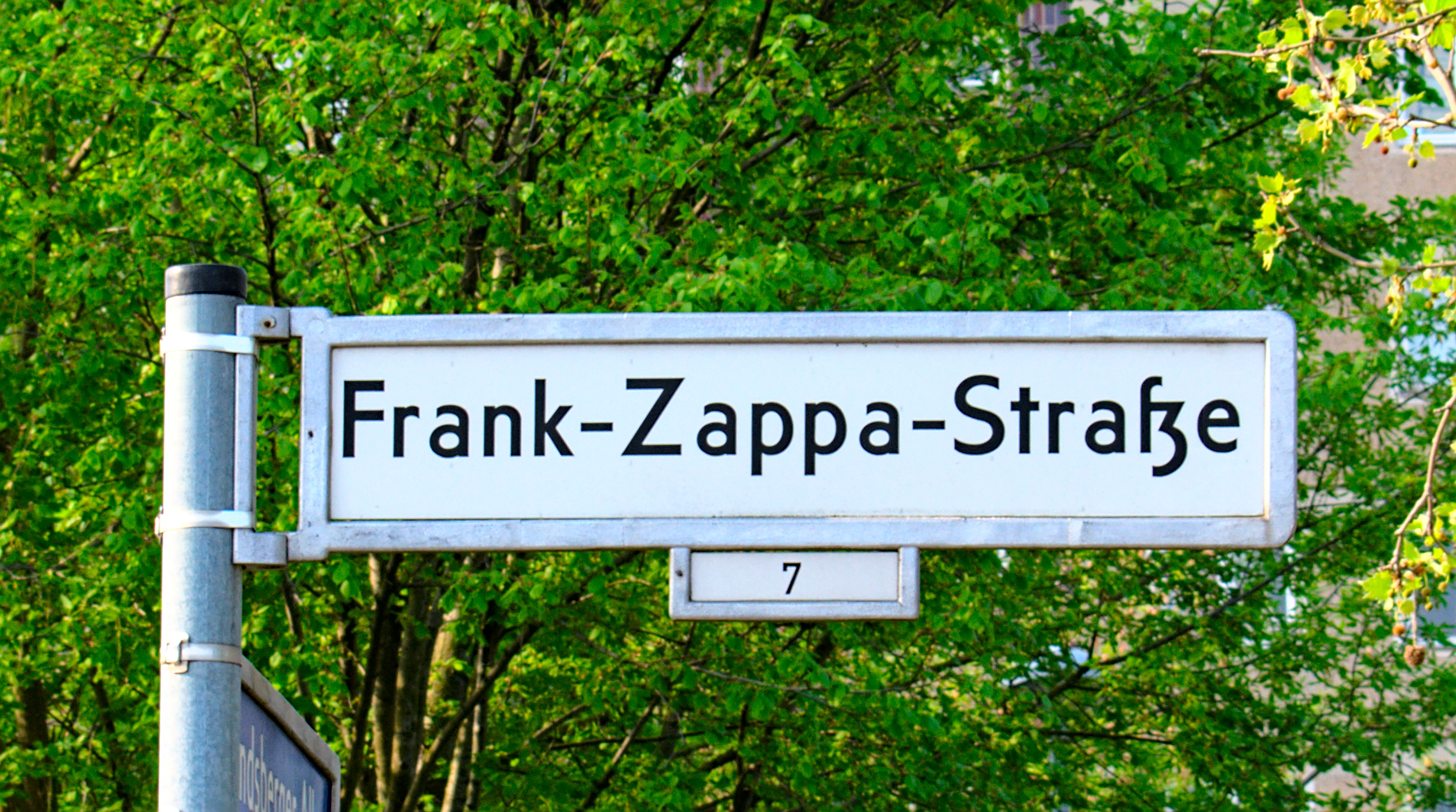
Frank-Zappa-Straße in Berlin

Between 1997 and 1999 animator Gabor Csupo owned a restaurant in L.A., named after Lumpy Gravy.

In late July, 2007, the city of Berlin, at the urging of the MUSIKFABRIK ORWOhaus (musicians community), renamed Street 13 in the Marzahn district (part of the former East Berlin) the "Frank-Zappa-Straße."

The street of Partinico, Sicily, where Zappa's father lived at number 13, Via Zammatà, has been renamed to Via Frank Zappa.

== Festivities ==
In 2007, Baltimore declared the 9th of August Frank Zappa Day.

== Politics ==
In 1989–1990 Zappa became Cultural Ambassador of Czechoslovakia, where he met president Václav Havel, who was a big fan of his music.
