= The Lumpy Money Project/Object =

Compilation album by Frank Zappa
- Released: January 23, 2009
- Recorded: 1967–1968
- Genre: Rock, orchestral, experimental
- Length: 205:29
- Label: Zappa (Official Release #85)
- Producer: Gail Zappa; Joe Travers

Frank Zappa chronology
Joe's Menage #84 (2008)	The Lumpy Money Project/Object (2009)	Philly '76 #86 (2009)

The Lumpy Money Project/Object is a compilation album by Frank Zappa. Released posthumously on January 23, 2009 as Official Release #85, it compiles the releases Lumpy Gravy and We're Only in It for the Money with previously unreleased material, with the overall package serving as an audio documentary of the production of the two albums, which share conceptual continuity themes. It is project/object #2 in a series of 40th Anniversary FZ Audio Documentaries, following MOFO (2006).

== Content ==
The first disc consists of the 1967 version of Lumpy Gravy, released by Capitol Records on 4-track cartridge to wholesalers and radio stations before MGM Records, Zappa's label at the time, forced Capitol to halt distribution of their version of the album, and the 1968 mono mix of We're Only in It for the Money. The second disc consists of two remixes prepared by Zappa in 1984, with overdubs by drummer Chad Wackerman and bassist Arthur Barrow. The Lumpy Gravy remix derives from the 1968 edit; this third version of the album had not been released in full; an excerpt appeared in a sampler for The Old Masters box set. The second remix, of We're Only in It for the Money had previously been released on compact disc in 1986. The third disc consists of studio assembly material and interviews with Zappa discussing the albums, as well as the single version of "Lonely Little Girl".

== Track listing ==
All music is composed by Frank Zappa.

Disc one – Lumpy Gravy (Primordial) – FZ's original orchestral edit for Capitol Records
No.	Title	Length
1.	"I Sink Trap"	2:45
2.	"II Gum Joy"	3:44
3.	"III Up and Down"	1:52
4.	"IV Local Butcher"	2:36
5.	"V Gypsy Airs"	1:41
6.	"VI Hunchy Punchy"	2:06
7.	"VII Foamy Soaky"	2:34
8.	"VIII Let's Eat Out"	1:49
9.	"IX Teenage Grand Finale"	3:30

We’re Only in It for the Money – 1968 original mono mix
No.	Title	Length
10.	"Are You Hung Up?"	1:26
11.	"Who Needs the Peace Corps?"	2:32
12.	"Concentration Moon"	2:22
13.	"Mom & Dad"	2:16
14.	"Telephone Conversation"	0:49
15.	"Bow Tie Daddy"	0:33
16.	"Harry, You're a Beast"	1:21
17.	"What's the Ugliest Part of Your Body?"	1:02
18.	"Absolutely Free"	3:26
19.	"Flower Punk"	3:03
20.	"Hot Poop"	0:26
21.	"Nasal Retentive Calliope Music"	2:03
22.	"Let's Make the Water Turn Black"	1:58
23.	"The Idiot Bastard Son"	3:22
24.	"Lonely Little Girl"	1:10
25.	"Take Your Clothes Off When You Dance"	1:34
26.	"What's the Ugliest Part of Your Body?" (Reprise)	0:58
27.	"Mother People"	2:31
28.	"The Chrome Plated Megaphone of Destiny"	6:23
Total length:		61:52

Disc two – Lumpy Gravy – 1984 UMRK remix
No.	Title	Length
1.	"Lumpy Gravy - Part One"	15:57
2.	"Lumpy Gravy - Part Two"	17:15

We’re Only in It for the Money – 1984 UMRK remix
No.	Title	Length
3.	"Are You Hung Up?"	1:23
4.	"Who Needs the Peace Corps?"	2:34
5.	"Concentration Moon"	2:17
6.	"Mom & Dad"	2:16
7.	"Telephone Conversation"	0:49
8.	"Bow Tie Daddy"	0:33
9.	"Harry, You're a Beast"	1:22
10.	"What's the Ugliest Part of Your Body?"	1:03
11.	"Absolutely Free"	3:28
12.	"Flower Punk"	3:04
13.	"Hot Poop"	0:29
14.	"Nasal Retentive Calliope Music"	2:03
15.	"Let's Make the Water Turn Black"	1:45
16.	"The Idiot Bastard Son"	3:17
17.	"Lonely Little Girl"	1:12
18.	"Take Your Clothes Off When You Dance"	1:35
19.	"What's the Ugliest Part of Your Body?" (Reprise)	0:57
20.	"Mother People"	2:31
21.	"The Chrome Plated Megaphone of Destiny"	6:26
Total length:		74:24

Disc three
No.	Title	Length
1.	"How Did That Get in Here?"	25:01
2.	"Lumpy Gravy 'Shuffle'"	0:30
3.	"Dense Slight"	1:42
4.	"Unit 3A, Take 3"	2:24
5.	"Unit 2, Take 9"	1:10
6.	"Section 8, Take 22"	2:39
7.	"'My Favorite Album'"	0:59
8.	"Unit 9"	0:41
9.	"N. Double A, AA"	0:55
10.	"Theme from Lumpy Gravy"	1:56
11.	"'What the Fuck’s Wrong with Her?'"	1:07
12.	"Intelligent Design"	1:11
13.	"Lonely Little Girl" (Original Composition - Take 24)	3:35
14.	"'That Problem with Absolutely Free'"	0:30
15.	"Absolutely Free" (Instrumental)	3:59
16.	"Harry, You’re a Beast" (Instrumental)	1:16
17.	"What’s the Ugliest Part of Your Body?" (Reprise / Instrumental)	2:01
18.	"Creationism"	1:11
19.	"Idiot Bastard Snoop"	0:47
20.	"The Idiot Bastard Son" (Instrumental)	2:48
21.	"'What’s Happening of the Universe'"	1:37
22.	"'The World Will Be a Far Happier Place'"	0:21
23.	"Lonely Little Girl" (Instrumental)	1:26
24.	"Mom & Dad" (Instrumental)	2:16
25.	"Who Needs the Peace Corps?" (Instrumental)	2:51
26.	"'Really Little Voice'"	2:28
27.	"Take Your Clothes Off When You Dance" (Instrumental)	1:24
28.	"Lonely Little Girl - The Single"	2:45
29.	"'In Conclusion'"	0:25
Total length:		71:54

== Personnel ==
- All music produced/composed & performed/conducted by Frank Zappa

Disc one

Lumpy Gravy (Primordial)

- Original tracking sessions at Capitol Studios produced by Nick Venet

We're Only in It for the Money – 1968 original mono mix

- Produced by Frank Zappa
- Mix created by FZ with Dick Kunc in 1968
- John Polito – mastering & audio restoration engineer, 2008

Disc two

- Bernie Grundman – mastering, 2008

Disc three

- Frank Zappa – construction (1, 28), Lumpy Gravy building block (3, 9, 12), VSO-control in Lumpy Gravy (8, 10), recording and mixing (10)
- Joe Travers – mixing (4-6, 13)
- Gary Kellgren – whispering (12)
- JCB – dialog (12)
- David Silver – interviewer (21)
- John Polito – mastering & audio restoration engineer, 2008

Lumpy Money

- Compiled & produced by Gail Zappa & Joe Travers
- All musics & recordings from the Vault
- Vaultmeisterment by Joe Travers for UMRK, 2008
- Liner notes by David Fricke
- Original art direction by NT&B (FZ)
- Conceptual & continuous stuff & text by GZ
- Production manager: Melanie Starks
- Solar dominance by Jupiter
- Cover art, package design & layout by Michael Mesker
- FZ portrait photo by Linda McCartney
