= Telephone Conversation =

Telephone Conversation may refer to:

- Telephone call, the use of a connection over a telephone network between two parties for audio communication
- "Telephone Conversation", a 1963 poem by Wole Soyinka
- "Telephone Conversation", a track on the 1968 album We're Only in It for the Money by the Mothers of Invention
