= Lumpy Gravy (1967 album) =

1967 album by Frank Zappa

- Recalled LP cover

Studio album by Frank Zappa and the Abnuceals Emuukha Electric Symphony Orchestra
- Released: August 7, 1967
- Recorded: February 13, 1967; March 14–16, 1967
- Studio: Capitol Studios
- Genre: Orchestral
- Length: 22:37
- Label: Capitol
- Producer: Nick Venet

Frank Zappa chronology
Absolutely Free (1967)	Lumpy Gravy (1967)	We're Only in It for the Money (1968)

Frank Zappa solo chronology
Lumpy Gravy (1967)	Lumpy Gravy (1968)

Lumpy Gravy, also known as Lumpy Gravy (Primordial), is the recalled original debut solo album by Frank Zappa. It is an entirely orchestral recording written by Zappa and performed by a group of session players he dubbed the Abnuceals Emuukha Electric Symphony Orchestra. Zappa conducted the orchestra but did not perform on the album. It was commissioned and briefly released, on August 7, 1967, by Capitol Records in the 4-track Stereo-Pak format only and then withdrawn due to a lawsuit from MGM Records. MGM claimed that the album violated Zappa's contract with their subsidiary, Verve Records, and the album was recalled.

In 1968, a second version of the album was released by Verve on May 13, 1968, which consisted of two musique concrète pieces that combined elements from the original orchestral performance with aspects of surf music and spoken word. The original 1967 album was reissued in 2018 under the title Lumpy Gravy (Primordial).

== Recording ==
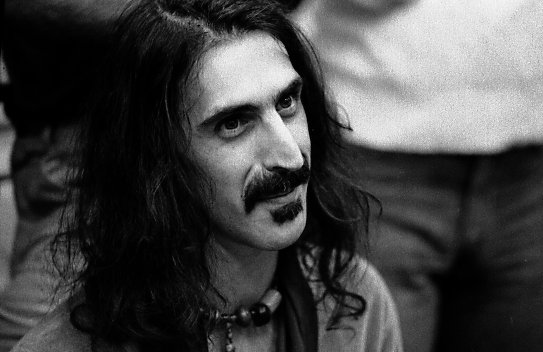
In 1966, Frank Zappa was commissioned to compose Lumpy Gravy for Capitol Records.

Following the release of Freak Out!, the debut album of the rock band the Mothers of Invention, Capitol Records A&R representative Nick Venet commissioned an album of orchestral music composed by the Mothers of Invention's leader, Frank Zappa, a self-taught composer. Venet spent $40,000 on the album. Because Zappa's contract with Verve and MGM Records did not allow for him to perform on albums recorded for any other label, he could not play any instrument on the proposed album, and instead served as the conductor of an orchestra consisting of session musicians hired for the recording. Zappa stated, "my contract [with MGM] did not preclude me from doing that. I wasn't signed as a conductor."

Lumpy Gravy was conceived as a short oratorio written in eleven days. Zappa named the group assembled for the sessions the "Abnuceals Emuukha Electric Symphony Orchestra". The album's mixing and mastering was completed on May 19, 1967.

Percussionist Emil Richards recalled that he did not know who Zappa was and did not take him seriously as the recording sessions began, believing that Zappa was merely the guitarist for a rock band. However, upon meeting them, Zappa handed the musicians the scores for the pieces, which were dense, complex, and varied in time signatures. Richards' close friend, guitarist Tommy Tedesco, was another member of the recording sessions. Tedesco mocked Zappa, believing that Zappa did not know what he was doing. The bassoonist and bass clarinetist hired for the sessions refused to perform their parts, declaring them impossible to play. Zappa responded, "If I play your part, will you at least try it?" Zappa then used his guitar to demonstrate the parts for the musicians, who then agreed to perform their assigned parts. By the end of the recording sessions, Richards and Tedesco became convinced of Zappa's talent and became friends with the composer. Richards later performed on sessions that appeared on Zappa's album Orchestral Favorites.

== Release, lawsuit and reediting ==
Capitol released Lumpy Gravy on August 7, 1967, only on the 4-track cartridge format, apparently in limited numbers. This version of the album is markedly different from the Lumpy Gravy that would become an official entry in Zappa's catalog. Capitol also intended to release a single consisting of the pieces "Gypsy Airs" and "Sink Trap" to promote its release. In response to the album's release, MGM threatened a lawsuit, claiming that its release violated Zappa's contract. The album was pulled from release and subsequently replaced with a second album of the same name, which contained much of the same music. Still, it was drastically different in composition, incorporating newly recorded dialogue excerpts, surf music, and other elements not present in the original recording.

The 1967 recording was released on compact disc in 2009 as part of the release The Lumpy Money Project/Object. The release presented the original orchestral-only edit prepared for Capitol Records from the 1967 recording sessions. On April 18, 2018, the original 1967 edit of the album was released on limited edition vinyl as a Record Store Day exclusive under the title Lumpy Gravy (Primordial).

== Reception ==
Professional ratings
Review scores
Source	Rating
AllMusic	4.5/5 stars

AllMusic wrote, "Some people have said that adding all the dialog was essentially FZ giving the middle finger to Verve by giving them an album that was much more difficult to sell than an album of excellent instrumental music would have been. For many, Lumpy Gravy Primordial will be a much more pleasurable listening experience than Lumpy Gravy since it doesn't have all the distracting dialog."

== Track listing ==
All tracks are written by Frank Zappa.

Side one
No.	Title	Length
1.	"Sink Trap"	2:45
2.	"Gum Joy"	3:44
3.	"Up and Down"	1:52
4.	"Local Butcher"	2:36
Total length:		10:57

Side two
No.	Title	Length
5.	"Gypsy Airs"	1:41
6.	"Hunchy Punchy"	2:06
7.	"Foamy Soaky"	2:34
8.	"Let's Eat Out"	1:49
9.	"Teenage Grand Finale"	3:30
Total length:		11:40

== Personnel ==
Musicians – Abnuceals Emuukha Electric Symphony Orchestra

- Arnold Belnick – strings
- Harold Bemko – strings
- Chuck Berghofer – bass
- Jimmy Bond – bass
- Dennis Budimir – guitar
- Frank Capp – drums
- Donald Christlieb – woodwind
- Gene Cipriano – woodwind
- Vincent DeRosa – french horn
- Joseph DiFiore – strings
- Jesse Ehrlich – strings
- Alan Estes – percussion, drums
- Gene Estes – percussion
- Roy Estrada – bass
- Victor Feldman – percussion, drums
- Bunk Gardner – woodwind
- James Getzoff – strings
- Philip Goldberg – strings
- John Guerin – drums
- Jimmy "Senyah" Haynes – guitar
- Harry Hyams – strings
- Jules Jacob – woodwind
- Pete Jolly – piano, celeste, harpsichord
- Ray Kelly – strings
- Jerome Kessler – strings
- Alexander Koltun – strings
- Bernard Kundell – strings
- William Kurasch – strings
- Michael Lang – piano, celeste, harpsichord
- Arthur Maebe – French horn
- Leonard Malarsky – strings
- Shelly Manne – drums
- Lincoln Mayorga – piano, celeste, harpsichord
- Ted Nash – woodwind
- Richard Perissi – French horn
- Glenn Phillips – vocals
- Don Randi – piano
- Jerome Reisler – strings
- Emil Richards – percussion
- Tony Rizzi – guitar
- John Rotella – percussion, woodwind
- Joseph Saxon – strings
- Ralph Schaeffer – strings
- Leonard Selic – strings
- Kenny Shroyer – trombone
- Paul Smith – piano, celeste, harpsichord
- Tommy Tedesco – guitar
- Al Viola – guitar
- Bob West – bass
- Tibor Zelig – strings
- Jimmy Zito – trumpet

Production credits

- Frank Zappa – composer, conductor
- Cal Schenkel – artwork
