= G-Spot Tornado =

Song by Frank Zappa

from the album Jazz from Hell
- Released: 1986
- Studio: UMRK (Los Angeles)
- Genre: Electronic; experimental; computer music
- Length: 3:17
- Songwriter: Frank Zappa
- Producer: Frank Zappa

"G-Spot Tornado" is a piece of programmed Synclavier DMS music written by American musician Frank Zappa, released in 1986 on his instrumental album Jazz from Hell.

== History ==
"G-Spot Tornado" was written by Frank Zappa. He thought that the composition was so difficult to play that it could not possibly be performed by a human, therefore he initially recorded the song using a Synclavier DMS. The piece, one of, "Zappa's most successful Synclavier releases in the tonal idiom...employ[s] the verse-chorus structure of pop and rock music." "Especially in [its] orchestral incarnation, [G-Spot Tornado] is one of the most riveting, rhythm-dominated, inexorable things Frank ever wrote." The composition was selected as one of the top ten favorites of subscribers to Zappa fanzine T'Mershi Duween.

=== Parental advisory label ===
"G-Spot Tornado" was released at the time when the RIAA introduced the Parental Advisory, and therefore the discs were forced to have a parental advisory even when none of the album's tracks had lyrics, but rather due to the song's title which mentioned the G-spot, the female erogenous zone.

Zappa went to the Parents Music Resource Center Senate Hearing, a former committee formed in 1985 by the wives of many Deputies with the stated goal of increasing parental control over children's access to music deemed to have violent, drug-related or sexual themes by labeling albums with Parental Advisory stickers. Zappa spoke with William Rehnquist (then Chief Justice of the United States), justices Sandra Day O'Connor, Clarence Thomas, and Al Gore, who declared himself a fan of the Mothers of Invention.

=== The Yellow Shark ===
"G-Spot Tornado", arranged in 1992 by Ali N. Askin, was part of Zappa's last album The Yellow Shark (1993) interpreted this time by human musicians at Ensemble Modern in Frankfurt, Germany, with participation of Canadian Dancer Louise Lecavalier. This performance proved Zappa's assumption that the composition was unable to be played by humans incorrect.
