= Intracolonic explosion =

Medical emergency

An intracolonic explosion or colonic gas explosion is an explosion inside the colon of a person due to ignition of explosive gases such as methane. This can happen during colonic exploration, as a result of the electrical nature of a colonoscope.

A colonic gas explosion is rare; however, the result can be acute colonic perforation, which can be fatal.

== Cause ==
An explosion is triggered by a combination of combustible gases such as hydrogen or methane, combustive gas such as oxygen, and heat. An explosion can also be caused by Crohn's disease.

== Prevention ==
Careful bowel preparation, such as cleansing the colon before a procedure, is key to preventing an intracolonic explosion.

== See also ==
- Fart lighting, the intentional ignition of flatulence using an ignition source such as a lighter
