= Fart lighting =

Lighting farts on fire

Lighting a fart

Fart lighting, also known as pyroflatulence or flatus ignition, is the practice of igniting the gases produced by flatulence. The resulting flame is often of a blue hue hence the act being known colloquially as a "blue angel", "blue dart" or in Australia, a "blue flame". Other colors of flame such as orange and yellow are possible depending on the mixture of gases formed in the colon.

In 1999, author Jim Dawson observed that fart lighting has been a novelty practice primarily among young men or college students for decades but is discouraged for its potential for causing harm. Such experiments typically occur on camping trips and in single-sex group residences, such as tree-houses, dormitories, or fraternity houses. With the advent of video sharing features online, hundreds of self-produced videos, both documentary as well as spoof, have been posted to sites such as YouTube. In his book: The Curse of the Self: Self-Awareness, Egotism, and the Quality of Human Life, author Mark Leary explains how a great deal of unhappiness is due to people's inability to exert control over their thoughts and behavior and that "stupid stunts", including lighting flatulence, were a way to make an impression and be included in group bonding or hazing.

There are many anecdotal accounts of flatus ignition, and the activity appears in popular culture. In his book Electric Don Quixote: The Definitive Story of Frank Zappa, author Neil Slaven quotes Zappa discussing "the manly art of fart-burning", and Zappa's lyrics for "Let's Make the Water Turn Black" include "Ronny helping Kenny helping burn his poots away". Another Zappa book quotes his neighbor Kenny Williams saying that it demonstrates "compression, ignition, combustion and exhaust."

There have been documented cases of flatulence during surgery being inadvertently ignited causing patient injury and the risk of death.

== Chemistry ==
The composition of flatus varies dramatically among individuals. Flatulence produces a mixture of gases including methane, which burns in oxygen forming water and carbon dioxide often producing a blue hue (Δ_{c}H = −891 kJ/mol), as:

CH_{4}(g) + 2 O_{2}(g) → CO_{2}(g) + 2 H_{2}O(g)

Hydrogen sulfide is also flammable (Δ_{c}H = −519 kJ/mol), and burns in oxygen to create sulfur dioxide and water.

2 H_{2}S(g) + 3 O_{2}(g) → 2 SO_{2}(g) + 2 H_{2}O(g)

=== Gas production ===
Some of the gases that cause flatulence, such as methane and hydrogen, are produced by bacteria which live in symbiosis within the large intestines of humans and other mammals. The gases are created as a by-product of the bacteria's digestion of food into relatively simpler substances. The oxygen and nitrogen component of flatus can be accounted for by aerophagy while the CO_{2} component results from the reaction of stomach acids (HCl) with alkaline pancreatic bile (NaHCO_{3}).

The odor associated with flatus is due to hydrogen sulfide, skatole, indole, volatile amines, and short-chain fatty acids also produced by the bacteria. These substances are detectable by olfactory neurons in concentrations as low as 10 parts per billion, hydrogen sulfide being the most detectable.

== See also ==
- Human gastrointestinal microbiota
- Natural gas
