= Civilization Phaze III =

Studio album by Frank Zappa
- Released: October 31, 1994
- Recorded: 1967, 1991–1992
- Studios: Apostolic (New York); UMRK (Hollywood); Joe's Garage (Hollywood)
- Genres: 20th-century classical; electronic; computer music; sound collage
- Length: 113:40
- Label: Barking Pumpkin
- Producer: Frank Zappa

Frank Zappa chronology
The Yellow Shark (1993)	Civilization Phaze III (1994)	The Lost Episodes (1996)

Civilization Phaze III is the sixty-third album by Frank Zappa, released posthumously as a double album on October 31, 1994. It was the first studio album of new material from Zappa since 1986's Jazz from Hell. The album marks the third part of a conceptual continuity that started with We're Only in It for the Money (1968), with the second part being the 1968 re-edited version of Lumpy Gravy. Zappa described the album as a "two-act opera", but in lieu of traditional recitatives and arias, it alternates brief spoken word passages with musical numbers created on a Synclavier using a combination of sampled and synthesized sounds. Much of the sampled material in the second half of the album was originally recorded by Ensemble Modern and other musicians to Zappa's specifications.

The storyline of Civilization Phaze III involves a group of people living inside a piano, and the menacing reality of the outside world. The album's themes include personal isolation and nationalism. Much of the album's improvised dialogue was originally recorded as part of sessions which produced We're Only in It for the Money and Uncle Meat, which contained some dialogue by the same speakers, and some of the dialogue on this album previously appeared on the re-edited version of Lumpy Gravy released in 1968. New dialogue was recorded by Zappa in 1991, and includes similarly improvised dialogue by members of Ensemble Modern, Zappa's daughter Moon Unit and actor Michael Rapaport.

== Background ==
In 1967, while recording We're Only in It for the Money with the Mothers of Invention, Frank Zappa discovered that the strings of Apostolic Studios' grand piano would resonate if a person spoke near those strings. The "piano people" experiment involved Zappa having various speakers improvise dialogue using topics offered by Zappa. Various people contributed to these sessions, including Eric Clapton, Rod Stewart and Tim Buckley. The "piano people" voices primarily consisted of Mothers of Invention bandmembers Motorhead Sherwood and Roy Estrada, Spider Barbour (leader of the rock band Chrysalis), All-Night John (the manager of the studio) and Louis Cuneo, who was noted for his laugh, which sounded like a "psychotic turkey".

In 1992, Zappa recorded The Yellow Shark with the Ensemble Modern orchestra, and sampled their instrumentation with his Synclavier. After revisiting his archives, he decided to create an album which would combine the 1967 "piano people" dialogue, Synclavier music, performances by the Ensemble Modern, and newly recorded dialogue. The project began under the title Lumpy Gravy, Phase 3 (with phase one being We're Only in It for the Money and phase two being the 1968 version of Lumpy Gravy), but was later changed to Civilization Phaze III.

Zappa recorded new dialogue segments to accompany the original "piano people" recordings. The new dialogue speakers included members of the Ensemble Modern, Moon Zappa, Dweezil Zappa and actor Michael Rapaport.

== Concept and music ==
The album's storyline was conceived via improvised dialogue involving a series of randomly chosen words, phrases and concepts, which included motors, pigs, ponies, dark water, nationalism, smoke, music, beer and personal isolation. The music was conceived as an opera pantomime, and is dark and ominous. The Ensemble Modern samples allowed the Synclavier to produce richer-sounding music than Zappa's previous works using the machine, which produced the cruder-sounding music on albums such as Jazz from Hell. University of Washington music theory chair Jonathan W. Bernard suggests that Civilization Phaze III is heavily influenced by Zappa's disenchantment with avant-garde composition and Zappa's acute awareness of his own mortality. Bernard suggests that Civilization Phase III is Zappa's last, greatest attempt at being recognized as a composer of "serious music".

== Release ==
Civilization Phaze III was the final album Frank Zappa completed before he died. It was published posthumously by Barking Pumpkin Records on October 31, 1994, solely as a mail order album, with no advertising or promotion; the album subsequently received a strong number of orders from Zappa's fanbase. Rykodisc was given the option of distributing the album nationally, but the label ultimately did not distribute it.

The album was also not released with Zappa's other works in the 2012 reissue of his catalog, but it can still be ordered from the artist's official website. "I think it's very much about finishing his life," said his widow, Gail Zappa, in an interview. "After he finished this, he said, 'I've done everything that I can'".

== Reception ==
Professional ratings
Review scores
Source	Rating
AllMusic	4/5 stars
Rolling Stone	4/5 stars

AllMusic reviewer François Couture wrote: "It belongs to his corpus of 'serious music'. [...] The original artwork and packaging are stunning and luxurious, a match for the music, some of the most compelling Zappa wrote outside of the rock realm." However, some critics felt that the "piano people" narrative did not hold up for a double album. The album won the 1995 Grammy Award for Best Recording Package.

== Track listing ==
All tracks are written by Frank Zappa.

Act One
No.	Title	Length
1.	"'This Is Phaze III'"	0:47
2.	"Put a Motor in Yourself"	5:13
3.	"'Oh-Umm'"	0:50
4.	"They Made Me Eat It"	1:48
5.	"Reagan at Bitburg"	5:39
6.	"'A Very Nice Body'"	1:00
7.	"Navanax"	1:40
8.	"'How the Pigs' Music Works'"	1:49
9.	"Xmas Values"	5:31
10.	"'Dark Water!'"	0:23
11.	"Amnerika"	3:03
12.	"'Have You Ever Heard Their Band?'"	0:38
13.	"Religious Superstition"	0:43
14.	"'Saliva Can Only Take So Much'"	0:27
15.	"Buffalo Voice"	5:12
16.	"'Someplace Else Right Now'"	0:32
17.	"Get a Life"	2:20
18.	"'A Kayak (On Snow)'"	0:28
19.	"N-Lite: I. Negative Light / II. Venice Submerged / III. The New World Order / IV. The Lifestyle You Deserve / V. Creationism / VI. He Is Risen"	18:00
Total length:		56:03

Act Two
No.	Title	Length
1.	"'I Wish Motorhead Would Come Back'"	0:14
2.	"Secular Humanism"	2:41
3.	"'Attack! Attack! Attack!'"	1:24
4.	"I Was in a Drum"	3:38
5.	"'A Different Octave'"	0:57
6.	"'This Ain't CNN'"	3:20
7.	"'The Pigs' Music'"	1:17
8.	"A Pig with Wings"	2:52
9.	"'This Is All Wrong'"	1:42
10.	"Hot & Putrid"	0:29
11.	"'Flowing Inside-Out'"	0:46
12.	"'I Had a Dream About That'"	0:27
13.	"Gross Man"	2:54
14.	"'A Tunnel into Muck'"	0:21
15.	"Why Not?"	2:18
16.	"'Put a Little Motor in 'Em'"	0:50
17.	"'You're Just Insultin' Me, Aren't You!'"	2:13
18.	"'Cold Light Generation'"	0:44
19.	"Dio fa" ( (Note: A profanity used in Piedmont (Italy), meaning "God is a liar"))	8:18
20.	"'That Would Be the End of That'"	0:35
21.	"Beat the Reaper"	15:23
22.	"Waffenspiel"	4:05
Total length:		57:37

== Personnel ==
- Frank Zappa – producer, compiler, editor, composer, performer, conductor, liner notes (1993)
- Dick Kunc – 1967 dialog engineer
- David Dondorf – 1991 dialog and chamber group piece engineer
- Todd Yvega and Marque Coy – 1991 full ensemble recording engineers
- Spencer Chrislu – 1992 Synclavier material and all final mixes engineer
- Uri Balashov – cover design
- Command A Studios – art direction

1967 voices

- Spider Barbour – "This is Phaze III"
- All-Night John [Kilgore] – "What about Phaze I & II?"
- Frank Zappa – "People are going to sit inside a big piano..."
- Euclid James "Motorhead" Sherwood a.k.a. Larry Fanoga
- Roy Estrada – "It's not even a Wurlitzer"
- Louis "The Turkey" Cuneo – "They made me eat it"
- Monica [Boscia] – "Don'tcha have a family?"
- Gilly Townley – "I'd rather be someplace else right now"
- Becky Wentworth [credited as "Unknown Girl #1"] – "I want the bass strings"
- Maxine [credited as "Unknown Girl #2"] – "A kayak (on snow)"

1991 voices

- Moon Unit Zappa – "Am I the only girl in here?"
- Michael Rappaport – "This ain't CNN!"
- Ali N. Askin – Turkish & Bavarian dialects
- Catherine Milliken – "Uh-oh!" during "N-Lite"
- Walt Fowler – deranged gurgling during "N-Lite"
- Todd Yvega – "Not as often as I'd like to..."
- Michael Svoboda – desires a pastrami sandwich
- Michael Gross – German commentary
- William Formann – Belgian commentary
- Uwe Dierksen – German commentary
- Stefan Dohr – German commentary
- Daryl Smith – "You BOUGHT this space?" & Italian commentary
- Franck Ollu – French commentary
- Hermann Kretzschmar – "Telefon carte"
- Dweezil Zappa – "Woof!"

Members of the Ensemble Modern

- Dietmar Weisner – piccolo, flute, alto flute, bass flute
- Catherine Milliken – oboe, English horn, baritone oboe, didjeridoo
- Roland Diry – clarinet
- Wolfgang Stryi – tenor sax, bass clarinet, contrabass clarinet
- Veit Scholz – bassoon, contrabassoon
- William Formann – trumpet, fleugel horn
- Michael Gross – trumpet, fleugel horn
- Franck Ollu – French horn
- Stefan Dohr – French horn
- Uwe Dierksen – trombone, pygmy trombone
- Michael Svoboda – bass trombone, alp horn, didjeridoo, conch
- Daryl Smith – tuba
- Peter Rundel – violin 1
- Mathias Tacke – violin 2
- Hilary Sturt – viola
- Friedemann Dähn – cello
- Thomas Fichter – contrabass, electric bass
- Detlef Tewes – mandolin
- Jürgen Ruck – guitar, banjo
- Ueli Wiget – harp
- Hermann Kretzschmarr – piano, celeste
- Rumi Ogawa-Helferich – cymbalom, percussion
- Rainer Römer – musical saw, percussion
- Andreas Böttger – marimba, percussion

== Note and references ==
Note
