= Old Masters (box set) =

The Old Masters

Box set series by Frank Zappa
- Released: Box One - April 1985; Box Two - November 1986; Box Three - December 1987
- Genre: Rock
- Label: Barking Pumpkin
- Producer: Frank Zappa

Frank Zappa chronology
| Francesco Zappa (1984) | The Old Masters (1985) | Frank Zappa Meets the Mothers of Prevention (1985) |
| Does Humor Belong in Music? (1986) | The Old Masters Box II (1986) | Jazz from Hell (1986) |
| London Symphony Orchestra, Vol. II (1987) | The Old Masters Box III (1987) | Guitar (1988) |

The Old Masters Box II

The Old Masters Box III

The Old Masters is a box set series by American musician Frank Zappa, released in three volumes on Barking Pumpkin Records from April 1985 to December 1987, consisting of studio and live albums by Zappa and The Mothers of Invention originally released from 1966 to 1976 on other labels, as well as "Mystery Discs" which contained previously unreleased material. The graphics (not including the photo inserts) on all three sets was airbrush illustrated by Larry Grossman. 200 Motels was not included in the series, as it was the only Zappa/Mothers album for which Zappa was unable to secure the rights.

The box sets contained new masters mixed and edited by Zappa in his Utility Muffin Research Kitchen home studio, prepared for the compact disc format. The albums were remixed and reedited, and are substantially different from their original releases.

The series was well received by critics, although some criticism was aimed at Zappa's alterations, most notably the decision to rerecord the rhythm sections of the albums We're Only in It for the Money and Cruising with Ruben & the Jets, which provoked a lawsuit over unpaid royalties.

== Background ==
In the 1980s, Frank Zappa had regained the rights to the albums he had released on other labels. He decided to reissue them as part of a series of three box sets for collectors. Zappa found the quality of the original masters to be unsatisfactory for release, and decided to prepare new masters, remixing and reediting the original tapes. In the case of the albums We're Only in It for the Money and Cruising with Ruben & the Jets, Zappa decided to rerecord the rhythm tracks, overdubbing newly recorded performances by bassist Arthur Barrow and drummer Chad Wackerman. Barrow stated of the remixing, "I had mixed feelings about it. On the one hand, as a musician, I'm always happy to be employed and doing sessions is always fun. But on the other hand, I did try to talk Frank out of it the best I could." Zappa told Barrow that he did not like the original performances, by bassist Roy Estrada and drummer Jimmy Carl Black.

During this period, Zappa also prepared a remix of the second version of his 1967 album Lumpy Gravy, featuring similar overdubs by Barrow and Wackerman. An excerpt from the remix was included in an Old Masters promotional sampler intended for radio station managers, but the remix was not released at the time; it appeared on Lumpy Money in 2008.

Zappa stated in regards to the remixing of the albums, "The master tapes for Ruben and the Jets were in better shape, but since I liked the results on We're Only in it For the Money, I decided to do it on Ruben too. But those are the only two albums on which the original performances were replaced. I thought the important thing was the material itself." After the remixing was announced, a $13 million lawsuit was filed against Zappa by Jimmy Carl Black, Bunk Gardner and Don Preston, who were later joined by Ray Collins, Art Tripp and Motorhead Sherwood, increasing the claim to $16.4 million, stating that they had received no royalties from Zappa since 1969.

Zappa told interviewers that the oxide was falling off the tapes, and that he had to replace the drum and bass performances. Barrow disputed this, stating "how could the oxide be falling off the tape on one track and not on other tracks? But it's Frank's album. It's his music. He can certainly do what he likes with it. But I think it would be nice for those of us that like the original version to put that out also [...] As for Ruben & The Jets, I kinda think that's bad too. Because one of the coolest things about that album originally was the tape loops for the drums. It sounded like a machine, it was a great sound."

In addition to the revised masters, Zappa prepared a "Mystery Disc" for two of the box sets, but not for the third Old Masters box.

Additionally, the third box did not include the albums Zappa in New York, Sleep Dirt, Studio Tan, and Orchestral Favorites, which Zappa had delivered to Warner Bros. Records in March 1977. Zappa later re-configured these 4 individual albums into the 4 LP Läther, which was scheduled for release in October 1977. Zappa said that he did this because Warner had not paid him for the 4 individual albums. Zappa in New York, Sleep Dirt, Studio Tan and Orchestral Favorites were subsequently released on compact disc by Barking Pumpkin in 1991, and Läther was released by Rykodisc in 1996.

All of the albums included in this set were subsequently issued on compact disc, in editions that used the masters which appeared on these boxes; the "Mystery Discs" were subsequently combined into a single release, Mystery Disc, released by Rykodisc in 1998. On this release, the tracks "Big Leg Emma" and "Why Don't You Do Me Right?" were excluded, as they had previously appeared on the compact disc edition of Absolutely Free.

== Track listing ==
The Old Masters Box I

- Freak Out!
- Absolutely Free
- We're Only in It for the Money
- Lumpy Gravy
- Cruising with Ruben & the Jets
- Mystery Disc

The Old Masters Box II

- Uncle Meat
- Hot Rats
- Burnt Weeny Sandwich
- Weasels Ripped My Flesh
- Chunga's Revenge
- Fillmore East, June 1971
- Just Another Band from L.A.
- Mystery Disc

The Old Masters Box III

- Waka/Jawaka
- The Grand Wazoo
- Over-Nite Sensation
- Apostrophe (')
- Roxy & Elsewhere
- One Size Fits All
- Bongo Fury
- Zoot Allures

== Reception ==
Professional ratings
Review scores
| Source | Rating |
|---|---|
| Allmusic Box I | 4.5/5 stars |
| Allmusic Box II | 4.5/5 stars |
| Allmusic Box III | 4.5/5 stars |

The individual box sets were well received. Allmusic reviewer William Ruhlmann gave each box 4.5 out of 5 stars. However, the remixing of the albums received some criticism from fans.
