= Jazz from Hell =

Studio album with live elements by Frank Zappa
- Released: November 1986
- Recorded: 1985–1986
- Studios: UMRK (Los Angeles) (except "St. Etienne": May 28, 1982 at Palais des Sports, Saint-Étienne, France)
- Genres: Electronic; experimental; computer music
- Length: 34:26
- Labels: Barking Pumpkin (US); EMI (UK)
- Producer: Frank Zappa

Frank Zappa chronology
The Old Masters Box II (1986)	Jazz from Hell (1986)	London Symphony Orchestra, Vol. II (1987)

Jazz from Hell is an instrumental album whose selections were all composed and recorded by American musician Frank Zappa. It was released in November 1986, by Barking Pumpkin Records on vinyl and cassette, and in 1987 by Rykodisc on CD.

Jazz from Hell was Zappa's final studio album released in his lifetime; for the remaining seven years of his life, he would only release live concert albums, although the posthumous Civilization Phaze III (1994) was completed shortly before his death.

== Background ==
Frank Zappa explained that the album title was a political reference: "Things in America can be from hell. Right now we have a president from hell (Ronald Reagan), and a National Security Council from hell, so we should add Jazz from Hell also." 1987's Video from Hell, in which the quote is featured, is titled similarly.

All compositions were executed by Frank Zappa on the Synclavier DMS with the exception of "St. Etienne", a guitar solo excerpted from a live performance Zappa gave of "Drowning Witch" from his Ship Arriving Too Late to Save a Drowning Witch album, during a concert in Saint-Étienne, France, on his 1982 tour.

"While You Were Art II" is a Synclavier performance based on a transcription of Zappa's improvised guitar solo on the track "While You Were Out" from the album Shut Up 'n Play Yer Guitar (1981). The unreleased original Synclavier performance was done using only the unit's FM synthesis, while the recording found here was Zappa's "deluxe" arrangement featuring newer samples and timbres.

"Night School" was possibly named for a late-night show that Zappa pitched to ABC; the network did not pick it up.

In 1986, Zappa explained that "the main advantage for me with the Synclavier is that I can imagine rhythms that human beings have difficulty contemplating, let alone executing. ... Why subject the musician to that punishment and torture when you can just type it in and get the thing mathematically exact." He added in 1987: "If I have access to a machine that will do impossible things, I want to make sure that the composition that results from the use of the machine contains at least a few of the impossibilities...runs going by at speeds that would be impossible to do on a guitar." "G-Spot Tornado" was later arranged for and performed by Ensemble Modern on the concert recording The Yellow Shark (1993).

== Releases ==
In the initial European CD release, the album was featured as the second album on a "two for the price of one compilation," with nine tracks from Frank Zappa Meets the Mothers of Prevention (1985) on the same disc.

It has been widely reported, including on message boards and by author Peter Blecha, and writer Charles Shaar Murray in The Independent, that, despite being entirely instrumental, Jazz from Hell received a Parental Advisory label for explicit content, in an act of retaliation by the Parents Music Resource Center (PMRC), whom Zappa testified against before a U.S. Senate committee. Josh Jones of Open Culture and the author Dave Thompson clarify that, although it did not receive the sticker on its original 1986 release, it instead was given a unique 'explicit lyrics' warning in 1990 by the department store chain Fred Meyer, likely due to the use of "hell" in the title and reference to the G-spot in the name of the fifth track, "G-Spot Tornado". In Censorship: A World Encyclopedia (2001), Zappa is described as "[holding] the distinction of having the only instrumental album (Jazz from Hell) to receive a warning label." Similarly, Jones refers to it as "the only fully instrumental album to receive an 'Explicit Lyrics' warning, inspired by, if not directly ordered by, the PMRC."

== Reception ==
Professional ratings
Review scores
Source	Rating
AllMusic	4/5 stars
Pitchfork	8.0/10

David Fricke of Rolling Stone wrote that "there is nothing particularly hellish about the eight pieces on the album, though it may have been a bitch to program these densely packed parcels of subdivided rhythms and Chinese-checker themes", also remarking that "it would have been nice to hear Zappa tear up his digital soundscape here and there with a little more real-sound guitar". A retrospective review from Sam Goldner of Pitchfork called the album "a MIDI-powered vision of the uncanny and bizarre future of music", with Goldner writing that "for all its complexity, Jazz from Hell is hardly a serious listen—it squiggles and dashes about like stock music that's broken out of its cage, begging to find new ways to be played with".

== Awards ==
Zappa won a 1988 Grammy Award for Best Rock Instrumental Performance for this album.

== Music videos ==
Zappa produced music videos for the songs "G-Spot Tornado" and "Night School". "G-Spot Tornado" features footage he shot in 1961 at a county fair, as well as some 1959 footage of Captain Beefheart and his family. "Night School" is a clay animation piece by Bruce Bickford.

== Track listing ==
All tracks are written by Frank Zappa.

Side one
No.	Title	Length
1.	"Night School"	4:47
2.	"The Beltway Bandits"	3:25
3.	"While You Were Art II"	7:17
4.	"Jazz from Hell"	2:58
Total length:		19:17

Side two
No.	Title	Length
5.	"G-Spot Tornado"	3:17
6.	"Damp Ankles"	3:45
7.	"St. Etienne"	6:26
8.	"Massaggio Galore"	2:31
Total length:		16:31

== Personnel ==
- Frank Zappa – lead guitar, Synclavier, keyboards, production

On "St. Etienne"

- Steve Vai – rhythm guitar
- Ray White – rhythm guitar
- Tommy Mars – keyboards
- Bobby Martin – keyboards
- Scott Thunes – bass guitar
- Chad Wackerman – drums
- Ed Mann – percussion

Technical personnel

- Greg Gorman – cover photo
- Bob Rice – computer assistant
- Bob Stone – engineering
