= Joe's Menage =

Live album by Frank Zappa
- Released: October 1, 2008
- Recorded: November 1, 1975
- Venues: College of William and Mary (Williamsburg, VA)
- Genre: Rock
- Length: 45:52
- Label: Vaulternative
- Producer: Frank Zappa

Frank Zappa chronology
One Shot Deal (2008)	Joe's Menage (2008)	Lumpy Money Project/Object (2009)

Professional ratings
Review scores
Source	Rating
AllMusic	4/5 stars

Joe's Menage is a live album by Frank Zappa, posthumously released on October 1, 2008. It contains previously unreleased material from 1975. It is the fourth album in the "Joe's Corsage" series, which is devoted to various rarities compiled by Joe Travers for the Zappa Family Trust. This album contains material from a concert in Williamsburg on November 1, 1975 (the middle part). It presents for the first time extensive recordings featuring vocalist and alto saxophonist Norma Jean Bell, who was only in Zappa's touring band for a brief period in late 1975.

== Overview ==
The album first germinated in 1978 when Zappa gave fan Ole Lysgaard several cassette tapes, including one of this 1975 concert. In 2004, Lysgaard sent the tapes to Gail Zappa who decided to release this particular dub made by Zappa. It was not possible to retrieve Zappa's original tapes, but the tape reel from which Zappa had produced the cassette dub was located in the vault. It was restored by Joe Travers and mastered by John Polito.

== Track listing ==
All tracks are written by Frank Zappa.

No.	Title	Length
1.	"Honey, Don't You Want a Man Like Me?"	3:57
2.	"The Illinois Enema Bandit"	8:42
3.	"Carolina Hard-Core Ecstasy"	6:02
4.	"Lonely Little Girl"	2:46
5.	"Take Your Clothes Off When You Dance"	2:10
6.	"What's the Ugliest Part of Your Body?"	1:16
7.	"Chunga's Revenge"	14:18
8.	"Zoot Allures"	6:41

== Personnel ==
- Frank Zappa – guitar and vocals
- Norma Jean Bell – alto saxophone and vocals
- Napoleon Murphy Brock – tenor saxophone and vocals
- Andre Lewis – keyboards and vocals
- Roy Estrada – bass and vocals
- Terry Bozzio – drums and vocals

== Album credits ==
- Original recording and cassette produced by Frank Zappa
- CD Compilation reconstruction and vaultmeisterment: Joe Travers
- Recordist: Davey Moire
- Mastering and audio restoration: John Polito
- Art direction: Gail Zappa
- Title layout: Keith Lawler
- Production manager: Melanie Starks
