= Abnuceals Emuukha Electric Symphony Orchestra =

The Abnuceals Emuukha Electric Symphony Orchestra was a group of Hollywood session musicians organized by Frank Zappa in 1967 to record music for his first solo album, Lumpy Gravy. Some of these musicians are thought to have worked together in various combinations under the leadership of Ken Shroyer as far back as 1959. However, it was Zappa who gave them the name several years later. Lumpy Gravy peaked at 159 on the Billboard 200 in 1968.

In 1975, Zappa organized another group using the same name which involved a few of the same musicians. This group recorded music for his album Orchestral Favorites, released in 1979.

== Musician credits for Lumpy Gravy ==
Musician credits
Piano, Celeste
Electric Harpsichord
Pete Jolly
Mike Lang
Lincoln Mayorga
Paul Smith
Drums
Frank Capp
John Guerin
Shelly Manne
Percussion (Note: Gongs, Bells, Vibes, Marimba, Timpani, Timbales & assorted insanity)
Alan Estes
Gene Estes
Victor Feldman
Emil Richards
Woodwinds (Note: Flute, Bass Flute, Piccolo, Oboe, English Horn, Eb Clarinet, Bb Clarinet, Bass Clarinet, Contrabass Clarinet, Alto Sax, Bass Sax, Bassoon & Contrabassoon)
Don Christlieb
Gene Cipriano
Bunk Gardner
Jules Jacob
Ted Nash
John Rotella
French Horns
Vincent DeRosa
Arthur Maebe
Richard Parisi
Trumpet
Jimmy Zito
Trombone
Kenneth Shroyer

Musician credits
Guitars
Dennis Budimir
Jim Haynes
Tony Rizzi
Tommy Tedesco
Al Viola
Bass
John Balkin
Chuck Berghofer
Jimmy Bond
Lyle Ritz
Bob West
Strings
Harold Ayres
Arnold Belnick
Harold G. Bemko
Joseph DiFiore
Jess Ehrlich
James Getzoff
Philip Goldberg
Harry Hyams
Raymond J. Kelly
Jerome A. Kessler
Alexander Koltun
Bernard Kundell
William Kurasch
Leonard Malarsky
Jerome J. Reisler
Ralph Schaeffer
Leonard Selic
Tibor Zelig
