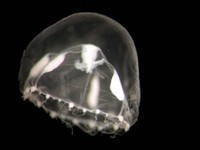
- Phialella zappai

Scientific classification
- Kingdom: Animalia
- Phylum: Cnidaria
- Class: Hydrozoa
- Order: Leptothecata
- Family: Phialellidae; Russell, 1953
- Genus: Phialella; Browne, 1902

= Phialella =

Genus of hydrozoans

Phialella is a genus of hydrozoans. It is the only genus within the monotypic family Phialellidae.

== Species ==
The following species are recognized within the genus Phialella:

- Phialella belgicae (Hartlaub, 1904)
- Phialella chilensis (Hartlaub, 1905)
- Phialella chiquitita (Millard, 1959)
- Phialella falklandica Browne, 1902
- Phialella fragilis (Uchida, 1938)
- Phialella macrogona Xu, Huang & Wang, 1985
- Phialella parvigastra (Mayer, 1900)
- Phialella quadrata (Forbes, 1848)
- Phialella xiamenensis Huang, Xu, Lin & Guo, 2010
- Phialella zappai Boero, 1987
