= Lumpy Gravy =

1968 album by Frank Zappa

Studio album by Francis Vincent Zappa and the Abnuceals Emuukha Electric Symphony Orchestra & Chorus
- Released: May 13, 1968
- Recorded: February 13 – October 1967
- Genres: Sound collage; orchestral; musique concrète; experimental rock
- Length: 31:45
- Label: Verve
- Producer: Nick Venet

Frank Zappa chronology
We're Only in It for the Money (1968)	Lumpy Gravy (1968)	Cruising with Ruben & the Jets (1968)

Lumpy Gravy is a 1968 solo album by Frank Zappa (originally credited as Francis Vincent Zappa, and as Frank Vincent Zappa on reissues), written by Zappa and performed by a group of session players he dubbed the Abnuceals Emuukha Electric Symphony Orchestra & Chorus. Zappa conducted the orchestra but did not perform on the album. It is his third album overall (fourth released): his previous releases had been under the name of his group, the Mothers of Invention.

An entirely orchestral version of the album was commissioned and briefly released, on August 7, 1967, by Capitol Records in the 4-track Stereo-Pak format only and then withdrawn due to a lawsuit from MGM Records. MGM claimed that the album violated Zappa's contract with their subsidiary, Verve Records. In 1968 it was reedited and released by Verve on May 13, 1968. The new album consisted of two musique concrète pieces that combined elements from the original orchestral performance with elements of surf music and spoken word. It was praised for its music and editing.

Produced simultaneously with We're Only in It for the Money, Zappa saw Lumpy Gravy as the second part of a conceptual continuity that later included his final album, Civilization Phaze III.

== Recording ==
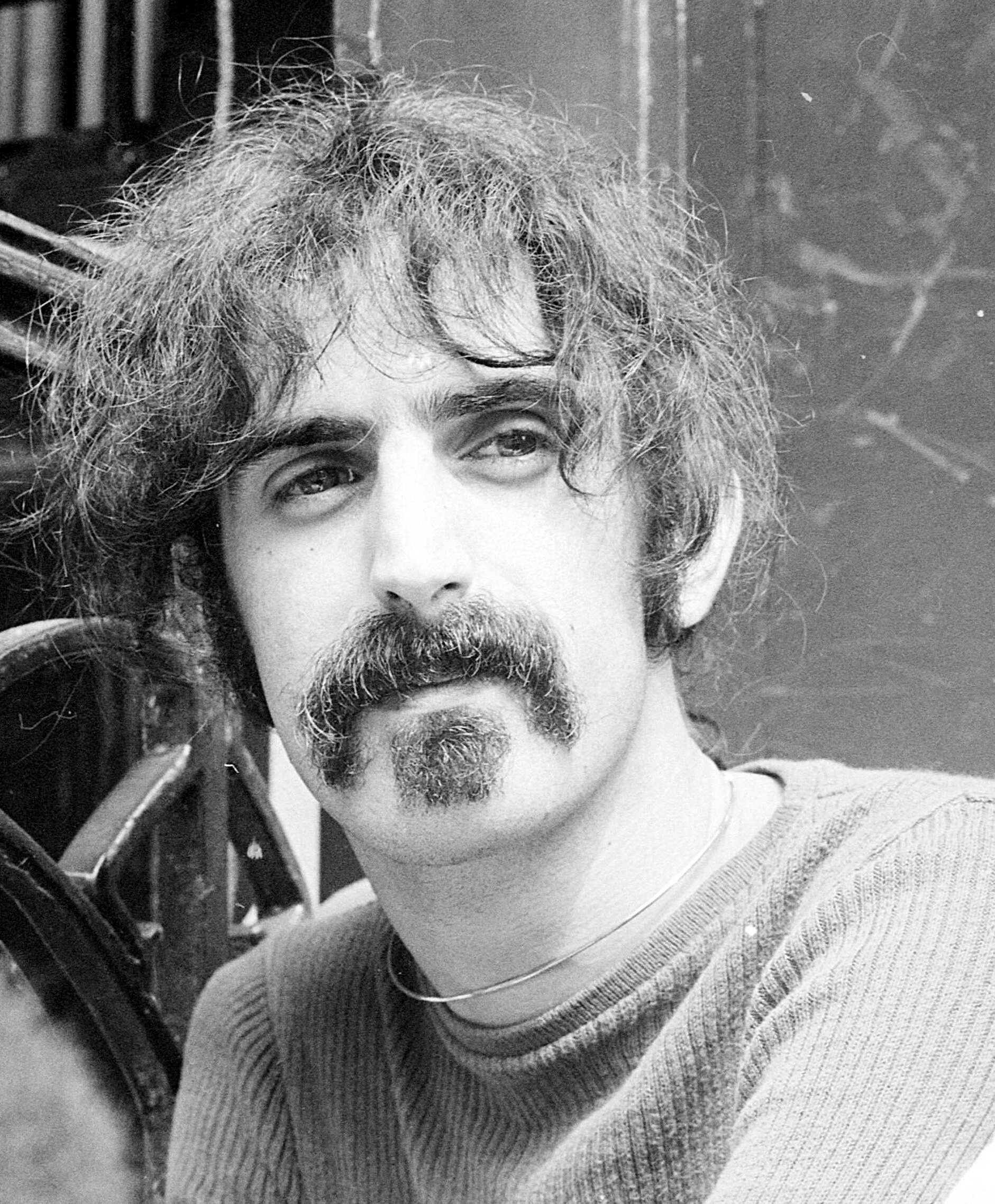
In 1966, Frank Zappa was commissioned to compose Lumpy Gravy for Capitol Records.

Following the release of Freak Out!, the debut album of the rock band the Mothers of Invention, Capitol Records A&R representative Nick Venet commissioned an album of orchestral music composed by the Mothers of Invention's leader, Frank Zappa, a self-taught composer. Venet spent $40,000 on the album. Because Zappa's contract with Verve and MGM Records did not allow for him to perform on albums recorded for any other label, he could not play any instrument on the proposed album, and instead served as the conductor of an orchestra consisting of session musicians hired for the recording. Zappa stated that "my contract [with MGM] did not preclude me from doing that. I wasn't signed as a conductor." Lumpy Gravy was conceived as a short oratorio, written in eleven days. Zappa named the group assembled for the sessions the "Abnuceals Emuukha Electric Symphony Orchestra & Chorus".

Percussionist Emil Richards recalled that he did not know who Zappa was and did not take him seriously as the recording sessions began, believing that Zappa was merely the guitarist for a rock band. However, upon meeting them, Zappa handed the musicians the scores for the pieces, which were dense, complex and varied in time signatures. Richards' close friend, guitarist Tommy Tedesco, was another member of the recording sessions. Tedesco mocked Zappa, believing that Zappa did not know what he was doing. The bassoonist and bass clarinetist hired for the sessions refused to perform their parts, declaring them impossible to play. Zappa responded, "If I play your part, will you at least try it?" Zappa then used his guitar to demonstrate the parts for the musicians, who then agreed to perform their assigned parts. By the end of the recording sessions, Richards and Tedesco became convinced of Zappa's talent and befriended him. Richards later performed on sessions which appeared on Zappa's album Orchestral Favorites.

== Release, lawsuit and reediting ==
Capitol released the original all-orchestral Lumpy Gravy album on August 7, 1967, only on the 4-track cartridge format, apparently in limited numbers. Capitol also intended to release a single consisting of the pieces "Gypsy Airs" and "Sink Trap" to promote its release. In response to the album's release, MGM threatened a lawsuit, claiming that its release violated Zappa's contract.

During the litigation, Zappa expanded and significantly edited the album, adding spoken word and musique concrète interludes, as well as some pieces of music from his pre-Mothers archives. The original Lumpy Gravy was not re-released until 2009, with the Zappa Records triple-CD release, The Lumpy Money Project/Object.

Lumpy Gravy is edited together out of hundreds, maybe thousands of tiny pieces of tape which took a long time to collect. First of all you have to find just the right little noise and things that are going to go in there, and then you have to manually cut these pieces of tape together with a razor blade.

— Frank Zappa (1987)

The dialogue segments were recorded at Apostolic Studios in New York City after Zappa discovered that the strings of the studio's grand piano would resonate if a person spoke near those strings. The "piano people" experiment involved Zappa having various speakers improvise dialogue using topics offered by Zappa. Most of the dialogue on the reedited Lumpy Gravy, recorded simultaneously with We're Only in It for the Money, was spoken by a small group which included Motorhead Sherwood, Roy Estrada, Spider Barbour, All-Night John (the manager of the studio) and Louis Cuneo, who was noted for his laugh, which sounded like a "psychotic turkey". The concept of the reedited album derived from Zappa's "big note" theory, which states that the universe consists of a single element, and that atoms are vibrations of that element, a "big note".

The revised album proved to be very difficult to make, as the orchestral master tapes recovered from Capitol featured many poor splices. The reedited version also incorporated additional musical content not on the original release of the album, including previously recorded surf music and a 1963 Zappa-produced demo recording of a tune that later appeared in a 1967 recording under the title "Take Your Clothes Off When You Dance" on We're Only in It for the Money. Some of the editing was done in Zappa's living room. On the 1967 and 1968 releases of the album, Zappa was credited as "Francis Vincent Zappa", as Zappa had believed that this was his real name. He later learned that his birth name was Frank Vincent Zappa, and this mistake was subsequently corrected in reissues of the album.

== Reception and legacy ==
Professional ratings
Review scores
Source	Rating
AllMusic	4/5 stars
Encyclopedia of Popular Music	3/5 stars
The Great Rock Discography	6/10
The Rolling Stone Album Guide	3.5/5 stars
Uncut	7/10

The 1968 Lumpy Gravy album was well received by critics, and Zappa called it one of his favorite albums out of his own work, stating that it contains his favorite music. Barry Miles, writing in International Times, described the album as fusing John Cage's Fontana Mix (1958) and John Carisi's "Moon Taj" (1962) with Zappa's distinctive style of "lyricism and cynicism", and praised Zappa's editing of the "loaded" conversation snippets, deeming them "masterpieces of editing". In a mixed review, Jim Miller of Rolling Stone called it Zappa's "most curious" album to date, finding it to represent the extreme of his "fragmented musical approach", but believed it to be overall "rather inert" and criticised the spoken sections for seeming forced. However, they deemed it an important album, concluding: "It might be said that Zappa makes mistakes other rock composers would be proud to call their own best music; Lumpy Gravy is an idiosyncratic musical faux pas that is worth listening to for that reason alone."

Retrospectively, AllMusic writer François Couture wrote, "The starting point of Zappa's 'serious music,' Lumpy Gravy suffers from a lack of coherence, but it remains historically important and contains many conceptual continuity clues for the fan." David Cavanagh of Uncut wrote that the "collage-style concept album" features "some of his most avant-garde music as well as some of his most bizarre encounters with his fellow Mothers." Ian Stonehouse of The Rough Guide to Rock wrote that the album shows Zappa at his "most original", noting its cut-up blend of musique concrète, R&B, jazz and "mumblings from inside a grand piano", and deemed it a "masterpiece that anticipated sampling technology". Miles, writing for The History of Rock, wrote that the record "owed far more to Varèse and Stravinsky than to rock'n'roll."

Edwin Pouncey of The Wire writes that the album is "[t]he culmination of Zappa's commitment to contemporary classical and electronic music", and deemed it crucial for combining "classically motivated interludes, electronic abstractions and rambling spoken word compositions within a basic rock structure. Whereas other 'rock stars' frequently toyed with vague notions of musique concrète and experimental music, Zappa incorporated them into a medium that extended his musical repertoire and pushed the prowess of The Mothers Of Invention to new heights of skill and endurance." Ultimate Classic Rock writer Ryan Reed describes it as an "avant-garde masterpiece" which has become overlooked in Zappa's discography for being one of his more unorthodox recordings, "branching from musique concrete to gorgeous jazz-fusion to proto-electronic hysteria to pitch-shifted rock grooves". They write that it has had "a sizable influence on both rock and avant-garde artists over the years".

In 1984, the second version of Lumpy Gravy was remixed by Zappa, with new overdubs by bassist Arthur Barrow and drummer Chad Wackerman. This third version of the album was not released in full at the time; an excerpt appeared in a The Old Masters sampler sent to radio stations. Additional dialogue from the "piano people" sessions was included on Zappa's later album Frank Zappa Meets the Mothers of Prevention, and his final album, Civilization Phaze III in 1993. In 2009, the box set Lumpy Money was released, containing the 1967 and 1984 versions of Lumpy Gravy, and audio documentary material derived from the sessions that produced the original 1967 orchestral sessions, dialogue which appeared in the 1968 release of Lumpy Gravy, and the album We're Only in It for the Money.

== Track listing ==
All tracks composed by Frank Zappa.

Side one
No.	Title	Length
1.	"Part I"	15:45

Side two
No.	Title	Length
1.	"Part II"	15:56

=== 1995 CD indexes ===
CD reissues have two tracks like the original LP, but the 1995 Rykodisc CD also has many indexes within the two tracks; these are listed below.

Part one
No.	Title	Length
1.	"The Way I See It, Barry"	0:06
2.	"Duodenum"	1:32
3.	"Oh No"	2:03
4.	"Bit of Nostalgia"	1:35
5.	"It's from Kansas"	0:30
6.	"Bored Out 90 Over"	0:31
7.	"Almost Chinese"	0:25
8.	"Switching Girls / Oh No Again / At the Gas Station" ( (Note: The back cover of the CD lists 12 indexes for part one, "Oh No Again" being #9 and "At the Gas Station" being #10, however they are actually both on the same index as "Switching Girls". The indexes on the CD, not the back cover, are given here.))	4:23
9.	"Another Pickup"	0:54
10.	"I Don't Know If I Can Go Through This Again"	3:49
Total length:		15:51

Part two
No.	Title	Length
1.	"Very Distraughtening"	1:33
2.	"White Ugliness"	2:22
3.	"Amen"	1:33
4.	"Just One More Time"	0:58
5.	"A Vicious Circle"	1:12
6.	"King Kong"	0:43
7.	"Drums Are Too Noisy"	0:58
8.	"Kangaroos"	0:57
9.	"Envelops the Bath Tub"	3:42
10.	"Take Your Clothes Off"	1:53
Total length:		15:51

== Personnel ==
Musicians – Abnuceals Emuukha Electric Symphony Orchestra & Chorus with maybe even some of the Mothers of Invention

- Frank Zappa – conductor

Piano, celeste, electric harpsichord:

- Paul Smith
- Mike Lang
- Lincoln Mayorga
- Pete Jolly

Drums:

- Johnny Guerin
- Frankie Capp
- Shelly Manne

Percussion (Gongs, bells, vibes, marimba, timpani, timbales & assorted insanity):

- Emil Richards
- Gene Estes
- Alan Estes
- Victor Feldman
- Kenneth Watson (uncredited)
- Thomas Poole (uncredited)

Woodwinds (Flute, bass flute, piccolo, oboe, English horn, Eb clarinet, Bb clarinet, bass clarinet, contrabass clarinet, alto sax, bass sax, bassoon & contrabassoon):

- Ted Nash
- Jules Jacob
- John Rotella
- Bunk Gardner
- Don Christlieb
- Gene Cipriano

French horns:

- Arthur Maebe
- Vincent De Rosa
- Richard Parisi
- Arthur E. Briegleb (uncredited)
- David A. Duke (uncredited)
- George F. Price (uncredited)

Trumpet:

- Jimmy Zito

Trombone:

- Kenneth Shroyer
- Lew McCreary (uncredited)

Guitars:

- Jim Helms (credited as Jim Haynes)
- Tommy Tedesco
- Tony Rizzi
- Al Viola
- Dennis Budimer

Bass:

- Bob West
- John Balkin
- Jimmy Bond
- Lyle Ritts
- Chuck Berghofer

Strings:

- Alexander Koltun
- Tibor Zelig
- Ralph Schaeffer
- Bernard Kundell
- William Kurasch
- James Getzoff
- Philip Goldberg
- Leonard Selic
- Arnold Belnick
- Leonard Malarsky
- Harold Ayres
- Jerome J. Reisler
- Harry Hyams
- Joseph DiFiore
- Jerome A. Kessler
- Raymond J. Kelly
- Joseph Saxon
- Jessa Ehrlich
- Harold G. Bemko
- Sid Sharp (uncredited)

Chorus: (omit last names)

- Louie the Turkey [Louis Cuneo]
- Ronnie ~~Williams~~
- ~~Dick Barber~~ Foon the Younger
- Roy ~~Estrada~~
- Spider [James G. "Spider" Barbour]
- Motorhead [Jim Sherwood]
- J.K. [Adams] & Tony [Bongiovi]
- Gilly [Townley] and the girls from Apostolic (get their names) (Maxine, Gilly [Townley], Becky [Wentworth], Monica [Boscia])
- All Night John [Kilgore]
- Cal [Schenkel] & the other John [Townley]
- ~~Pumkin~~ Pumpkin [Gail Zappa]
- Larry Fanoga [also Jim Sherwood]
- Eric ~~Clapton~~ & Charlotte [Martin]
- Monica [Boscia]
- Jimmy Carl Black (the Indian of the group)
- Susan Kelly (uncredited)

Also:

- Sammy [Whiteside]
- Harold [Kelling]
- Charlie [Phillips]
- Bruce [Hampton]
- and the rest of the guys from Atlanta

Production credits

- Frank Zappa – producer, composer
- Magnificently engineered by: Joe, Rex, Pete, Jim, Bob & Gary & Dick
- Liner put together by Cal Schenkel

Special thanks to:

- Sid Sharp
- Bob Ross & Smiling Jack
- Ben Barrett
- Normal & Max
- My pumpkin/Hurby & John Judnich
- Moon

== Charts ==
Chart (1968)	Peak position
US Billboard 200	159
