= Take Your Clothes Off When You Dance =

Song by The Mothers of Invention

from the album We're Only in It for the Money
- Released: March 4, 1968
- Recorded: July 31 – September 1967
- Studio: Mayfair Studios, New York City
- Length: 1:35
- Label: Verve
- Songwriter: Frank Zappa
- Producer: Frank Zappa

Transcription of Take Your Clothes Off When You Dance (1961) (out of copyright)

"Take Your Clothes Off When You Dance" is a song written by Frank Zappa, with the first officially available version being recorded and released by The Mothers of Invention on their 1968 album We're Only in It for the Money. The song was originally recorded as an instrumental by Frank Zappa in 1961 at Pal Recording Studio.

== History ==
The first instance of lyrics being written for the melody is on a 1965 demo tape by The Mothers Of Invention on which the song is recorded as "I'm So Happy I Could Cry". The lyrics describe the sincere love of a man to a "girl he left behind him when he went out to see this great, big world". This version, released on the posthumous Frank Zappa album Joe's Corsage, also contains a bridge section that is not included in any other version of the song, save for the instrumental version that appears at the end of the "Lumpy Gravy" LP. At one point, the tune (without lyrics) was referred to by a working title of "Never On Sunday" (coincidentally the title of another very popular and oft-recorded song by Greek composer Manos Hatzidakis, written around the same time that Zappa wrote his song).

Two years later, in 1967, Zappa wrote entirely new lyrics to the tune and it was finally re-recorded by The Mothers Of Invention (in a more abbreviated arrangement, with the bridge section excised) as "Take Your Clothes Off When You Dance" for the album We're Only in It for the Money. The song would be known by this title from that point on. The lyrics to this version are a satirical look at social classes and the hippie subculture of the sixties.

The song was once again re-recorded by Frank Zappa for his album Lumpy Gravy under the shortened title "Take Your Clothes Off", this time in its more common instrumental form and, as previously mentioned, with the original bridge section that was excluded from the "We're Only In It For The Money" version of the track fully reincorporated. Most live performances of the song by Frank Zappa are instrumental jams.

== Song form ==
The music itself is somewhat lighthearted, but conforming to the style of most of Zappa's other material from the same period. It is musically sophisticated and somewhat complex, but based upon a very simple chord progression.

== Versions recorded By Frank Zappa ==
The song appears on the following Frank Zappa albums:

- We're Only in It for the Money (First version released. Length of 1:34)
- Lumpy Gravy (Instrumental. Original version, demo recorded in 1963. Length of 1:52)
- The Lost Episodes (Instrumental. Length of 3:51)
- FZ:OZ (Live version with vocals. Length of 2:02)
- You Can't Do That on Stage Anymore, Vol. 6 (Instrumental jam. Length of 3:46)
- Joe's Corsage (First version recorded with lyrics. As "I'm So Happy I Could Cry". Length of 2:43)
- Joe's Menage (Live version with vocals. Length of 2:10)

== Covers ==
The composition has been covered by the Dutch progressive rock band Gruppo Sportivo as part of their song "Superman", from their album "10 Mistakes" (1978).
