= We're Only in It for the Money =

- Original censored release cover

Studio album by The Mothers of Invention
- Released: March 4, 1968
- Recorded: March 6, 1967; July – October 8, 1967
- Studios: TTG (Hollywood); Capitol (Hollywood); Mayfair (New York); Apostolic (New York)
- Genres: Avant-garde; psychedelic rock; acid rock; experimental rock
- Length: 39:15
- Label: Verve
- Producer: Frank Zappa

Frank Zappa chronology
Lumpy Gravy (1967)	We're Only in It for the Money (1968)	Lumpy Gravy (1968)

Alternative cover
- Zappa's intended cover, used on reissues

We're Only in It for the Money is the third album by American rock band the Mothers of Invention, released on March 4, 1968, by Verve Records. As with the band's first two LP's, it is a concept album, written and composed by bandleader and guitarist Frank Zappa. The album satirizes left- and right-wing politics, the 1960s counterculture, the corporatization of rock music and youth culture, particularly the hippie subculture, as well as general American culture and society. It was conceived as part of a project called No Commercial Potential, which produced three other albums: Lumpy Gravy, Cruising with Ruben & the Jets, and Uncle Meat.

The album's originally intended cover artwork was arranged by Cal Schenkel and Jerry Schatzberg as a parody of the Beatles' Sgt. Pepper's Lonely Hearts Club Band. The photoshoot was financed by Zappa and featured Jimi Hendrix. However, Verve decided to package the album with the parody cover as interior artwork, with the original interior artwork (which parodied Sgt. Pepper's interior gatefold art) as the main sleeve out of fear of legal action. The original intended main sleeve artwork was later featured on the front cover of subsequent releases. Artists such as Eric Clapton, Rod Stewart and Tim Buckley would contribute to the recording sessions of the album.

We're Only in It for the Money encompasses experimental music and psychedelic rock, with orchestral segments taken from the recording sessions for Zappa's Lumpy Gravy, which had previously been issued by Capitol Records as a solo instrumental album in 1967. MGM claimed that Zappa was under contractual obligation to record for them and withdrew the album. Subsequently, Zappa re-edited Lumpy Gravy, releasing a drastically different version on Verve in 1968, produced simultaneously with We're Only in It for the Money. The album is the first "phase" of a conceptual continuity, which continued with the reedited Lumpy Gravy and concluded with Zappa's final album Civilization Phaze III (1994).

The album was unexpectedly embraced by the hippie subculture it criticized, peaking at number 30 on the Billboard 200, the highest position of any Mothers album. In August 1987, Rolling Stone ranked it number 77 on their article, "The Top 100: The Best Albums of the Last Twenty Years", and number 297 on their 2015 list of the 500 greatest albums of all time. It was also placed at number 343 in the third edition of Colin Larkin's All Time Top 1000 Albums (2000) and is featured in the book 1001 Albums You Must Hear Before You Die along with their 1966 debut album Freak Out!.

In 2005, We're Only in It for the Money was selected for preservation in the National Recording Registry by the United States' Library of Congress, who deemed it "culturally, historically, and aesthetically significant" and "a scathing satire on hippiedom and America's reactions to it".

== Background ==
While filming Uncle Meat, Frank Zappa recorded in New York City for a project called No Commercial Potential, which ended up producing four albums: We're Only in It for the Money; Lumpy Gravy (1968); Cruising with Ruben & the Jets (1968); and Uncle Meat (1969), which served as the soundtrack to the film of the same name, which finally saw a release in 1987, albeit in incomplete form.

In July 1967, singer Ray Collins had left the Mothers before the New York recording sessions took place, which led to Zappa singing lead vocals for most of the songs on the album, though they were slightly pitched up in post-production. Gary Kellgren was hired as an engineer for the project, and subsequently wound up delivering whispered pieces of dialogue for the album. Collins later rejoined when the band was recording the doo-wop songs that formed the album Cruising with Ruben & the Jets. As the recording sessions continued, the Beatles released their acclaimed album Sgt. Pepper's Lonely Hearts Club Band. In response to the album's release, Zappa decided to change the album's concept to parody the Beatles album, because he felt that the Beatles were insincere and "only in it for the money". The Beatles were targeted as a symbol of Zappa's objections to the corporatization of youth culture, and the album served as a criticism of them as well as the psychedelic and hippie movement as a whole.

In reference to the record being a "concept album", Zappa stated, "It's all one album. All the material in the albums is organically related and if I had all the master tapes and I could take a razor blade and cut them apart and put it together again in a different order it still would make one piece of music you can listen to. Then I could take that razor blade and cut it apart and reassemble it a different way, and it still would make sense. I could do this twenty ways. The material is definitely related."

== Recording and production ==
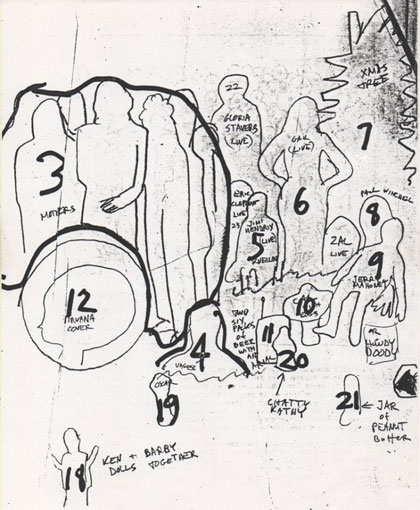
Sketch of the album cover made by Zappa. First shown by Cal Schenkel on Facebook in 2016

Recording for We're Only in it for the Money began on March 6, 1967, with the basic tracking of "Who Needs the Peace Corps?" at TTG Studios which was then under the title of "Fillmore". The working title was inspired by a series of performance the Mothers of Invention held at the Fillmore Auditorium, finishing a day prior to the recording session. Zappa would then inaugurate a three-day recording stint at Capital Studios to record Lumpy Gravy from March 14–16, 1967. The band returned to New York in the following week, where Zappa became acquainted to then Cream guitarist Eric Clapton during an acoustic guitar led jam at his home. The band subsequently spent from April to June rehearsing and gigging locally in support of their previous album Absolutely Free, which released on May 26, 1967. Popular contemporaries such as guitarist Jimi Hendrix, and singer-songwriter Essra Mohawk, joined the Mothers of Invention during their New York shows.

Primary recording sessions ran from July until September 1967 at Mayfair Studios in New York. During this period of work on the album, the band recorded at a continuous rate, only taking breaks on the weekends. While the Jimi Hendrix Experience occupied Mayfair Studios on July 19 and 20, to record "The Stars That Play with Laughing Sam's Dice", the band worked on and executed ideas for the cover art for We're Only in it for the Money. Hendrix would make an appearance in the Sgt. Pepper's Lonely Hearts Club Band mock cover, blending in with the cardboard cutouts of other major figures. Weekday work was only halted again on August 4, when Bob Dylan booked the studio to mix and press an acetate disc of "Too Much Of Nothing". A majority of the basic tracks would be finished in August, and September was spent mostly overdubbing onto the basic recordings. On September 4, the Velvet Underground, who the Mothers of Invention then detested, entered the studio's second recording space with Tom Wilson, the band's previous producer, to record their sophomore album, White Light/White Heat. Both bands did however co-operate in the studio, and Zappa even suggested to Velvet Underground front-man Lou Reed that he record himself stabbing a cantaloupe with a wrench in the band's song "The Gift". The Mothers of Invention halted work on September 22 to pursue what is considered to be their first European tour, before returning to Apostolic Studios, also in New York, from October 3–8 in order to finish the album off, with final overdubs and mixing occurring.

While recording We're Only in It for the Money, Zappa discovered that the strings of Apostolic Studios' grand piano would resonate if a person spoke near those strings. The "piano people" experiment involved Zappa having various speakers improvise dialogue using topics offered by Zappa. Various people contributed to these sessions, including Eric Clapton, Rod Stewart and Tim Buckley, who Zappa became familiar with after a concert in December 1966. The "piano people" voices primarily consisted of Motorhead Sherwood, Roy Estrada, Spider Barbour, All-Night John (the manager of the studio) and Louis Cuneo, who was noted for his laugh, which sounded like a "psychotic turkey".

"What's the Ugliest Part of Your Body?" (sample)

During the production, Zappa experimented with recording and editing techniques which produced unusual textures and musique concrète compositions; the album featured abbreviated songs interrupted by segments of dialogue and unrelated music which changed the continuity of the album. Segments of orchestral music included on the album came from a solo orchestral album by Zappa previously released by Capitol Records under the title Lumpy Gravy in 1967. MGM claimed that Zappa was under contractual obligation to record for them, and subsequently Zappa re-edited Lumpy Gravy, releasing a drastically different version on Verve Records, after the release of We're Only in It for the Money. The 1968 version consisted of two musique concrète pieces that combined elements from the original orchestral performance with aspects of surf music and spoken word. The artwork of Lumpy Gravy identified it as "phase 2 of We're Only in It for the Money", while We're Only in It for the Money was identified in its artwork as "phase one of Lumpy Gravy", alluding to the conceptual continuity of the two albums.

=== Censorship and reissues ===
We're Only in It for the Money was heavily censored upon release, with several different alternate versions of tracks being featured on later reissues. During the recording sessions, Verve requested that Zappa remove the entire verse containing "shut your fucking mouth about the length of my hair" and "you shitty little person" from the song "Mother People". Zappa complied, but reversed the recording and included the backwards verse as part of the dialogue track "Hot Poop", concluding the album's first side, though on some versions, even with the reverse effect, the line "fucking" is still cut. The entire reversed line would be removed by Verve themselves on subsequent represses of their own. Also censored on all copies was the line "don't come in me", which was a Lenny Bruce reference in "Harry, You're A Beast", which was also reversed and manipulated through tape effects by Zappa.

For some pressings of the album, MGM censored several tracks without Zappa's knowledge, involvement or permission. On the song "Absolutely Free", the line "I don't do publicity balling for you anymore" was edited by MGM to remove the word "balling", changing the meaning of the sentence. Additionally, on "Let's Make the Water Turn Black", the line "and I still remember Mama, with her apron and her pad, feeding all the boys at Ed's Cafe" was removed. Zappa later learned that this line was censored because an MGM executive thought that the word "pad" referred to a sanitary napkin, rather than a waitress's order pad. The other line that was censored ("Flower power sucks!") was cut entirely. On some versions of the album, the line "I will love the police as they kick the shit out of me on the street" was removed from "Who Needs the Peace Corps?".

The Kellgren dialogue segment in "Concentration Moon" was also re-edited, due to Kellgreen labelling the Velvet Underground "as shitty a group as Frank Zappa's group", the censorship made it seem like he was calling the Velvet Underground "Frank Zappa's group", while on later versions, the line is cut entirely. Zappa later declined to accept an award for the album upon being made aware of the censorship, stating "I prefer that the award be presented to the guy who modified this record, because what you're hearing is more reflective of his work than mine."

== Music and lyrics ==
In his lyrics for We're Only in It for the Money, Zappa speaks as a voice for "the freaks—imaginative outsiders who didn't fit comfortably into any group", according to AllMusic writer Steve Huey. Subsequently, the album satirizes hippie culture and left-wing politics, as well as targeting right-wing politics, describing both political sides as "prisoners of the same narrow-minded, superficial phoniness." Zappa later stated in 1978, "hippies were pretty stupid. ... the people involved in [youth] processes ... are very sensitive to criticism. They always take themselves too seriously. So anybody who impugns the process, whether it's a peace march or love beads or whatever it is – that person is the enemy and must be dealt with severely. So we came under a lot of criticism, because we dared to suggest that perhaps what was going on was really stupid."

Another element of the album's lyrical content came from the Los Angeles Police Department's harassment and arrests of young rock fans, (which later led to the Sunset Strip curfew riots) made it difficult for the band to perform on the West Coast, leading the band to move to New York City for better financial opportunities. Additionally, Zappa made reference to comedian Lenny Bruce; the song "Harry, You're A Beast" quotes Bruce's routine "To Is A Preposition, Come Is A Verb".

The song "Flower Punk" parodies the flower power movement and the garage rock staple "Hey Joe", and depicts a youth going to San Francisco to become a flower child, join a psychedelic rock band, smoke weed and acquire groupies. Additionally, the track makes a reference to "Wild Thing", one of the songs that defined the counterculture of that period. The rhythmic pattern of "Flower Punk" is complex, consisting of 4 bars of a fast 5 (2–3), followed by 4 bars of 7 (2–2–3).

On the album’s original liner notes, Zappa instructs listeners to read Franz Kafka’s In the Penal Colony before listening to the final track on the album, “The Chrome Plated Megaphone of Destiny”.

== Packaging and cover art ==
The intended front cover of the album was a parody of the Beatles' Sgt. Pepper's Lonely Hearts Club Band. At the insistence of the record company, the image was swapped with the gatefold sleeve.

Zappa's art director Cal Schenkel and Jerry Schatzberg photographed a collage for the album cover, which parodied the Beatles' Sgt. Pepper's Lonely Hearts Club Band. Zappa spent US$4,000 (equivalent to $37,000 in 2025) on the photo shoot, which he stated was "a direct negative" of the Sgt. Pepper album cover. "[Sgt. Pepper] had blue skies ... we had a thunderstorm." Jimi Hendrix, a friend of Zappa, took part in the photo shoot. Sgt. Pepper's inner gatefold and back cover artwork were also parodied.

Notable figures displayed on the cover art include Lee Harvey Oswald, Lyndon B. Johnson, Franz Kafka, Big Mama Thornton, Lon Chaney Jr., Sgt. Fury, Cal Schenkel, Ginevra de' Benci, Jim Leavelle, Pope Paul III, Count Orlok (Max Schreck), George Liberace, Eddie Haskell, Ed Wynn, Eric Burdon, Pauline Butcher (Zappa's secretary), Lloyd Price, Rod Serling, Richard E. Byrd, David Crosby, Theda Bara, Gracie Allen, Mary Martin, Statue of Liberty, Herb Cohen, Captain Beefheart, Nancy Sinatra, Hieronymus Bosch, Sandy Hurvitz (Suzy Creamcheese), Elvis Presley, Albert Einstein, Gail Zappa and Frank Zappa's fathers. Other figures include Frank Zappa's parents, family members, associates, high school teachers and classmates.

Zappa phoned Paul McCartney, seeking permission for the parody. McCartney told him that it was an issue for business managers, but Zappa responded that the artists themselves were supposed to tell their business managers what to do. Nevertheless, Capitol objected, and the album's release was delayed for five months. Verve decided to package the album with inverted cover artwork, placing the parody cover as interior artwork (and the original interior artwork as the main sleeve) out of fear of legal action. Zappa was angered over the decision; Schenkel felt that the Sgt. Pepper parody "was a stronger image" than the final released cover. Later reissues of the album showcased the intended front cover.

== Remix ==
In 1984, Zappa prepared a remix of the album for its compact disc reissue and the vinyl box set The Old Masters I. The remix reinstated audio that had been censored by Verve, as well as the original "Mother People" verse. It also featured new rhythm tracks recorded by bassist Arthur Barrow and drummer Chad Wackerman. Zappa would later do the same with Cruising with Ruben & the Jets, stating "The master tapes for Ruben and the Jets were in better shape, but since I liked the results on We're Only in It for the Money, I decided to do it on Ruben too. But those are the only two albums on which the original performances were replaced. I thought the important thing was the material itself."

Lumpy Gravy was also remixed by Zappa, but not released at the time. After the remixing was announced, a $13 million lawsuit was filed against Zappa by Jimmy Carl Black, Bunk Gardner and Don Preston, who were later joined by Ray Collins, Art Tripp and Motorhead Sherwood, increasing the claim to $16.4 million, stating that they had received no royalties from Zappa since 1969.

Zappa would later prepare a CD of the original stereo mix for release by Rykodisc in 1995. Unlike the remix, this retained the censorship applied to "Concentration Moon," "Harry You're a Beast" and "Mother People" on the original releases.

In 2009, the audio documentary box set The Lumpy Money Project/Object was released, which chronicles the production of We're Only in It for the Money, including the 1967 version of Lumpy Gravy, a 1968 mono mix of We're Only in It for the Money and 1984 remixes of We're Only in It for the Money and the 1968 Lumpy Gravy album, as well as additional material from the original recording sessions.

== Critical reception ==
Professional ratings
Review scores
Source	Rating
AllMusic	5/5 stars
Chicago Tribune	4/4 stars
The Encyclopedia of Popular Music	4/5 stars
Entertainment Weekly	A
The Great Rock Bible	8.5/10
MusicHound Rock	5/5 stars
Q	5/5 stars
The Rolling Stone Album Guide	5/5 stars
Tom Hull	B−
The Village Voice	A

We're Only In It For the Money was released on March 4, 1968, by Verve Records. The album was unexpectedly embraced by the hippie subculture it criticized. It peaked at number 30 on the Billboard 200, making it the most successful Mothers album. Zappa biographer Barry Miles notes that Zappa’s satire was often misread as affectionate or self-referential humor by those he was mocking, which was later most evident with the success of his single "Valley Girl".

Barret Hansen praised the album in an April 1968 review for Rolling Stone. He felt it was the most "advanced" rock album released up to that date, though not necessarily the "best"; he compared Zappa with the Beatles, and felt that the wit and sharpness of Zappa's lyrics was more intelligent, but unless one were to adopt a utilitarian view, he would not deny the beauty of the Beatles' music. He concluded that while the initial listening may be significantly profound, due to the reliance on shock, subsequent listening may be reduced in value; and he returns to a comparison with the Beatles, in which he feels that Zappa has the greater musical genius, but is less comfortable to listen to.

AllMusic writer Steve Huey wrote, "the music reveals itself as exceptionally strong, and Zappa's politics and satirical instinct have rarely been so focused and relevant, making We're Only in It for the Money quite possibly his greatest achievement." Robert Christgau gave the album an A, writing, "With bohemia permanent and changed utterly, this early attack on its massification hasn't so much dated as found its context. Cheap sarcasm is forever." In 2012, Uncut described the album as a "satirical psych-rock gem".

It was voted number 343 in the third edition of Colin Larkin's All Time Top 1000 Albums (2000). As of 2015, the album was ranked number 297 on Rolling Stone magazine's list of the 500 greatest albums of all time. Additionally, Rolling Stone ranked the album number 77 in its August 1987 article, "The Top 100: The Best Albums of the Last Twenty Years". It is also included in the book 1001 Albums You Must Hear Before You Die along with their album Freak Out!.

== Legacy ==
In 2005, the U.S. National Recording Preservation Board included We're Only in It for the Money in the National Recording Registry, calling it "culturally, historically, and aesthetically significant" and "a scathing satire on hippiedom and America's reactions to it".

In 2008, Dutch philosopher Jos de Mul and the Belgian author Annelies Verbeke chose We're Only in It for the Money as their desert island discs.

== Track listing ==
All tracks are written by Frank Zappa.

Side one
No.	Title	Length
1.	"Are You Hung Up?"	1:23
2.	"Who Needs the Peace Corps?"	2:34
3.	"Concentration Moon"	2:22
4.	"Mom & Dad"	2:16
5.	"Bow Tie Daddy" (intro split into "Telephone Conversation" on subsequent releases)	1:22
6.	"Harry, You're a Beast"	1:22
7.	"What's the Ugliest Part of Your Body?"	1:03
8.	"Absolutely Free"	3:24
9.	"Flower Punk"	3:03
10.	"Hot Poop"	0:26
Total length:		19:14

Side two
No.	Title	Length
1.	"Nasal Retentive Calliope Music"	2:03
2.	"Let's Make the Water Turn Black"	2:01
3.	"The Idiot Bastard Son"	3:18
4.	"Lonely Little Girl" (listed as "It's His Voice on the Radio" on the original LP sleeve)	1:09
5.	"Take Your Clothes Off When You Dance"	1:35
6.	"What's the Ugliest Part of Your Body? (Reprise)"	0:57
7.	"Mother People"	2:32
8.	"The Chrome Plated Megaphone of Destiny"	6:25
Total length:		20:00 39:15

== Personnel ==
The Mothers Today / The Mothers Yesterday

- Frank Zappa – guitar, piano, lead vocals & editing
- Billy Mundi – drums, vocal, yak & black lace underwear
- Bunk Gardner – all woodwinds, mumbled weirdness
- Roy Estrada – electric bass, vocals, asthma
- Don Preston – retired
- Jimmy Carl Black – Indian of the group, drums, trumpet, vocals
- Ian Underwood – piano, woodwinds, wholesome
- Euclid James "Motorhead" Sherwood – road manager, soprano & baritone saxophone, all purpose weirdness & teen appeal (we need it desperately)
- Suzy Creamcheese (Pamela Zarubica) – telephone
- Dick Barber – snorks

Also

- Gary Kellgren – creepy whispering
- Dick Kunc – cheerful interruptions
- Eric Clapton – has graciously consented to speak to you in several critical areas
- Spider – wants you to turn your radio around

Uncredited

- Charlotte Martin – voice on "Are You Hung Up?"
- Vicki Kellgren – telephone
- Dave Aerni – guitars on "Nasal Retentive Calliope Music"
- Paul Buff – drums, bass, organ, saxes on "Nasal Retentive Calliope Music"
- Ronnie Williams – backwards voice on "Let's Make the Water Turn Black"
- Bob Stone – engineer on 1984 remix
- Arthur Barrow – bass on 1984 remix
- Chad Wackerman – drums on 1984 remix

Production

- Frank Zappa – composer, arranger, producer
- Sid Sharp – conductor of orchestral segments
- Jerrold Schatzberg – photography
- Tiger Morse – fashions
- Cal Schenkel – plaster figures & all other artwork
- Tom Wilson – executive producer
- Nifty, Tough & Bitchen Youth Market Consultants for Bizarre Productions – packaging concept
- Gary Kellgren – engineer for two months of basic sessions at Mayfair Studios
- Dick Kunc – record & re-mix engineer for the final months of recording at Apostolic Studios

== Charts ==
Chart (1968)	Peak position
US Billboard 200	30
