= Are You Hung Up? =

Song by The Mothers of Invention

from the album We're Only in It for the Money
- Released: March 4, 1968
- Recorded: October 1967
- Studio: Apostolic Studios, New York City
- Genre: Musique concrète, experimental rock
- Length: 1:24
- Label: Verve/Bizarre/Rykodisc
- Songwriter(s): Frank Zappa
- Producer(s): Frank Zappa

"Are You Hung Up?" is the opening track on the 1968 album We're Only in It for the Money by The Mothers of Invention.

== Song structure ==
"Are You Hung Up?" is a short montage of dialogue and musique concrète, lasting 1 minute and 24 seconds. It includes stuttering hippie vocals by Eric Clapton, "Uh, out of sight. Are, are you hung up?", engineer Gary Kellgren whispering about Frank Zappa's mighty, omniscient presence in the control room, a brief guitar lick and Jimmy Carl Black saying "Hi, boys and girls, I'm Jimmy Carl Black and I'm the Indian of the group" and then laughing. Black's statement, a catchphrase used frequently by him in concert, is also used on the song "Concentration Moon" and resurfaces on later recordings by the Mothers of Invention.
