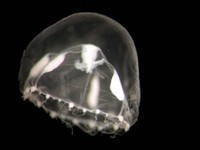

Scientific classification
- Kingdom: Animalia
- Phylum: Cnidaria
- Class: Hydrozoa
- Order: Leptothecata
- Family: Phialellidae
- Genus: Phialella
- Species: P. zappai

Binomial name
- Phialella zappai Boero, 1987

= Phialella zappai =

Species of hydrozoan

Phialella zappai is a species of cnidarian in the family Phialellidae. It was named for musician Frank Zappa by Ferdinando "Nando" Boero, a jellyfish expert from Genova, Italy who wrote to Zappa hoping to meet the musician whom he admired. Zappa replied saying "there is nothing I would like better than having a jellyfish with my name", leading to a meeting and eventually a friendly acquaintance between the biologist and the musician.

== See also ==
- List of organisms named after famous people (born 1925–1949)
