= Let's Make the Water Turn Black =

Song by The Mothers of Invention

from the album We're Only in It for the Money
- Released: March 4, 1968
- Recorded: August 3 – October 1967
- Studio: Mayfair Studios, New York City; Apostolic Studios, New York City
- Genre: Psychedelic rock
- Length: 2:01
- Label: Verve
- Songwriter: Frank Zappa
- Producer: Frank Zappa

"Let's Make the Water Turn Black" is a patter song which first appeared on the 1968 Mothers of Invention album We're Only in It for the Money and later on the 1995 compilation album Strictly Commercial. An uptempo instrumental version is featured on the 1991 live album Make a Jazz Noise Here.

== Background ==
"Let's Make The Water Turn Black" tells the true story of brothers Ronald and Kenneth Williams (referred to as "Ronnie" and "Kenny" respectively), neighbors of the song's composer Frank Zappa in the early 1960s, when he was living in Ontario, California.

It says that while their father, known as "Daddy Dinky" (Dalton Williams), was away at work "selling lamps and chairs to San Ber'dino squares" and while their mother (Signa), worked "feeding all the boys at Ed's Café" (on Holt Blvd. in Ontario, Ca.), the brothers occupied their after-school time with such activities as igniting each other's flatulence. In the original release, a reference to their mother "in her apron and her pad" was cut from the record; although the reference was about an order pad, a record executive thought it was a veiled reference to a sanitary napkin.

Further references can be found in the opening line of the chorus: "Whizzing and pasting and pooting through the day". "Whizzing" referred to Kenny's need to urinate in jars because he and Mothers of Invention saxophone player Jim "Motorhead" Sherwood were living in a garage on the Williams property, one which lacked plumbing. The results were "Kenny's little creatures on display", a reference to what Zappa described in a 1987 interview with Rolling Stone as "mutant tadpoles" which had appeared over time in the urine and could be seen swimming in it. "Pasting" is a reference to another part of the song which states that Ronnie saved his "pneumies" on a bedroom window, described rather bluntly in the song as "dysentery green". During the aforementioned Rolling Stone interview, Zappa related how the mess was soon discovered by the boys' mother. So thick was the dried mass that removal required "chisels and Ajax". "Pooting" refers to the act of flatulating.

The song's final verse includes references to the boys' adulthood, namely how Ronnie had joined the military, Kenny was "taking pills" and how they both yearned "to see a bomber burn". This may have a double meaning both as a reference to the burgeoning movement against the Vietnam War and as a reference to an African-American nickname for an exceptionally large marijuana cigarette. The final line, "Wait 'til the fire turns green," may be a final reference to igniting each other's flatulence. While the song itself is up to interpretation Frank Zappa discusses the song in detail in the book by Frank Zappa and Peter Occhiogrosso titled The Real Frank Zappa Book. The song title and lyric "Let's make the water turn black" are in reference to Ronnie and Kenny's procedure for producing alcohol from raisins. The lyric "Ronnie helping Kenny helping burn his poots away" is a reference to lighting farts. Ronnie would light Kenny's poots on fire, "wait till the fire turns green," then use the burning plastic as a heat source to heat the raisins prior to the fermenting process.

It ends when recording engineer Dick Kunc opens the talkback line to the recording studio to introduce "a little bit of vocal teenage heaven right here on earth". What follows are several seconds of backwards, distorted, guttural vocalizing by Ronald Williams himself.

The next song on the album "The Idiot Bastard Son" revisits the story of the Williams brothers in a more sedate style.
