= Absolutely Free (song) =

Song by The Mothers of Invention

from the album We're Only in It for the Money
- Released: March 4, 1968
- Recorded: July 31 – September 1967
- Studio: Mayfair Studios, New York City
- Genre: Psychedelic rock; experimental rock
- Length: 3:25
- Label: Verve/Bizarre/Rykodisc
- Songwriter: Frank Zappa
- Producer: Frank Zappa

"Absolutely Free" is a song written by Frank Zappa and released on the Mothers of Invention album We're Only in It for the Money in 1968. The song is not to be confused with the Mothers of Invention album of the same name.

== Lyrics and censorship ==
Like many of the songs on We're Only in It for the Money, "Absolutely Free" criticizes the hippie movement and the Summer of Love. The song's lyrics are a parody of psychedelia, especially the idea of expanding one's consciousness through the use of drugs. To this end, the song frequently mentions the word "discorporate", which is explained by Zappa in the spoken introduction to the song ("The first word in this song is discorporate. It means to leave your body"). "Discorporate" plays heavily in Robert Heinlein's science fiction novel Stranger in a Strange Land, which was very popular among hippies and inspired several songs by Jefferson Airplane.

The lyric also alludes to the song "Mellow Yellow" by singer-songwriter Donovan, who is often associated with the hippie movement ("The dreams as they live them are all mellow yellow").

On some pressings of the album, especially on earlier releases, two lines of the lyrics were censored. The first is the sentence "I don't do publicity balling for you anymore", uttered at the very beginning of the song by the character of Suzy Creamcheese. The word "balling" was cut from this line. The other line that was censored ("Flower power sucks!") was cut entirely.

== Musical structure ==
The song starts off with a piano intro, followed by a brief spoken part containing the aforementioned utterances by Zappa and Suzy Creamcheese. From then on, the song proper begins, a Waltz featuring a harpsichord, acoustic guitar, and a heavy use of reverb and other sound effects, which give the song a pseudo-psychedelic feel.
