= Freak Out! My Life with Frank Zappa =

2011 book by Pauline Butcher

- First edition
- Author: Pauline Butcher
- Genre: Non-fiction
- Publisher: Plexus Publishing
- Publication date: 2011

Freak Out! My Life with Frank Zappa is a 2011 book by British author Pauline Butcher, which is an account of the four years (1967–1971) she was rock and roll musician Frank Zappa's secretary.

Butcher was a 21-year-old secretary whose firm sent her to type up the lyrics from Zappa’s second album, Absolutely Free, for the free London newspaper, International Times. After arriving in California, Butcher first helped Zappa work on a book on politics, helped manage a group of female musicians Zappa founded, and managed the correspondence with his fans.

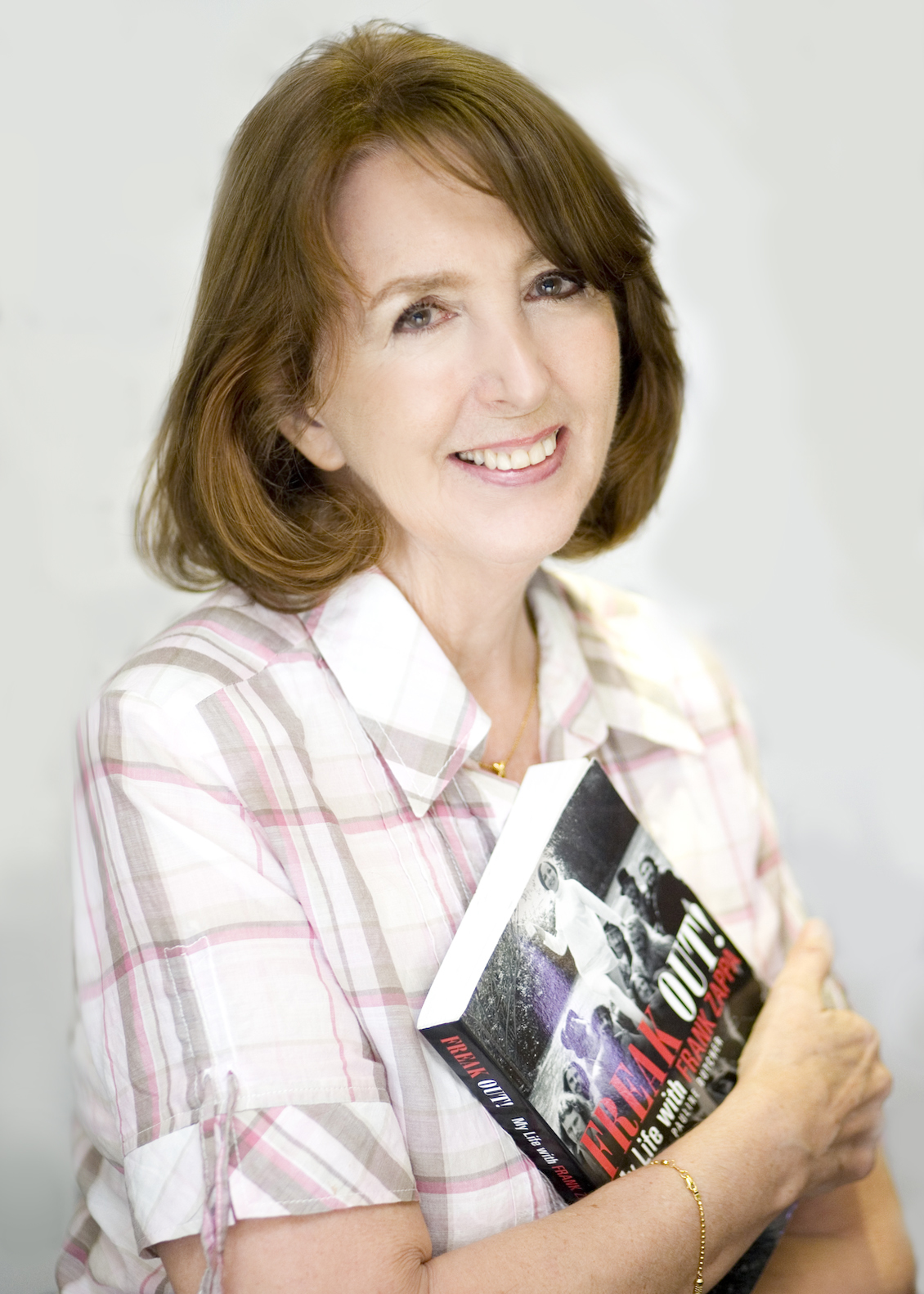
Author Pauline Butcher with a copy of Freak Out! My Life with Frank Zappa

In 2008, Butcher began to write her memoir; she used as source material her mother's detailed letters. Her mother had kept them in a shoe-box for 40 years. They were letters Butcher wrote while living in California.

Reviewers asserted Butcher brought a different perspective to the study of Zappa's work than other members of Zappa's entourage. A review in Critics at large described Butcher as a "a cultured and fashionable secretary out of Swinging London," and characterized her book as "a reverse of Pygmalion". Jim Caligiuri, writing in the Austin Chronicle, concluded his review saying, "Offering deeply personal glimpses of Zappa, Butcher's coming-of-age story is so captivating and vividly told that many will be surprised to discover it's her first book."

According to Deborah Orr of The Guardian, the book "captures a particularly intense experience of a very brief, yet enormously influential, period in the evolution of western womanhood ... the interstitial time between 'sexual liberation' and 'women's liberation'".

The Telegraph published an excerpt from the book.

During an interview in 2012, Butcher spoke about taking the advice of a writing mentor who was at the BBC; she was told to "write something that no one else could write.". She worked to develop a script for a series based on her time with Zappa, only to learn that the BBC had approved a documentary about Zappa which would be hosted by Germaine Greer. When she was advised the BBC would not fund two Zappa projects, she decided to publish a book with her research.

In 2014 BBC Radio adapted the book into a radio drama.
