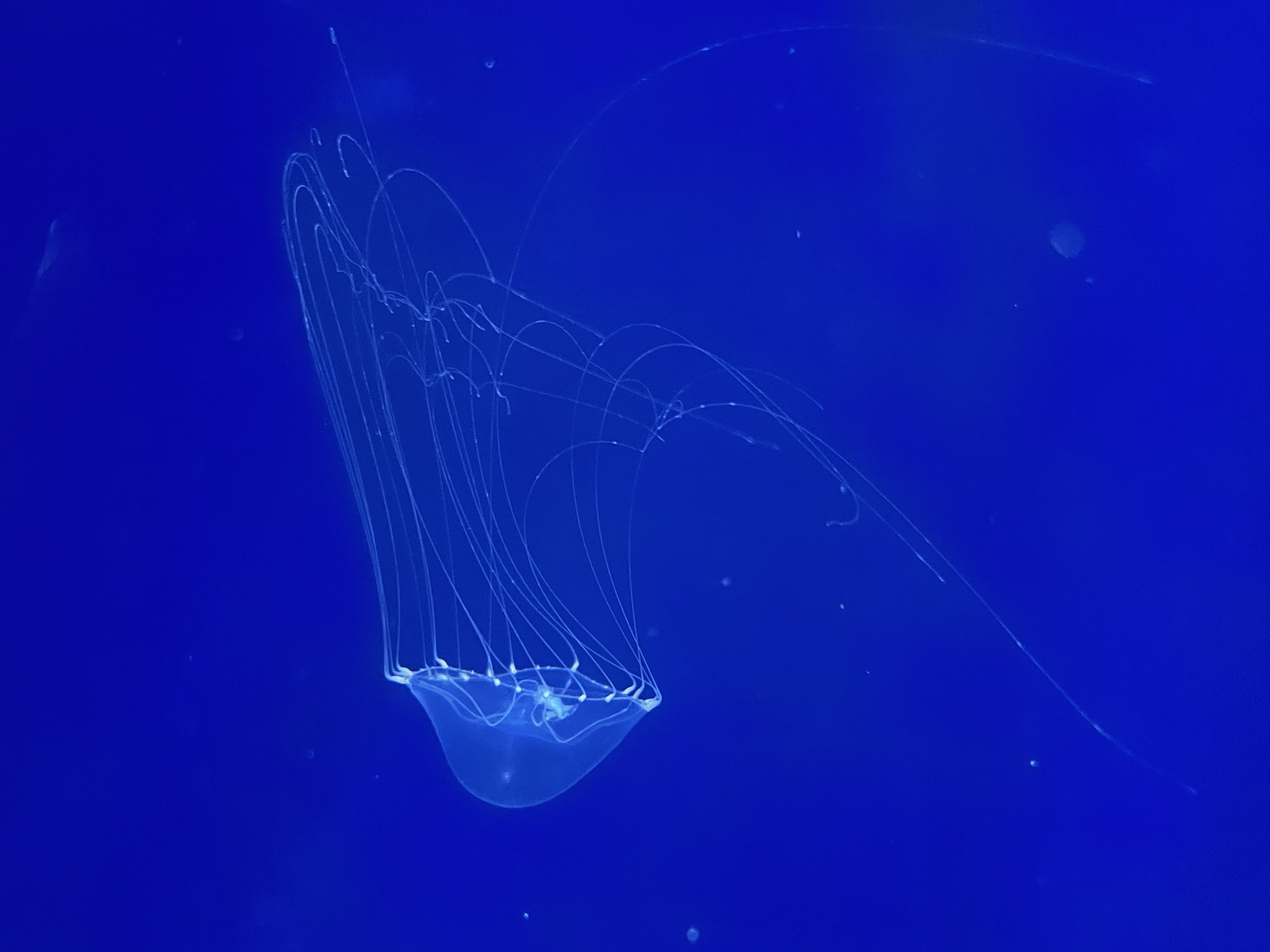

Scientific classification
- Kingdom: Animalia
- Phylum: Cnidaria
- Class: Hydrozoa
- Order: Leptothecata
- Family: Eirenidae
- Genus: Tima
- Species: T. nigroannulata

Binomial name
- Tima nigroannulata Calder et al, 2021

= Tima nigroannulata =

Species of hydrozoa

Tima nigroannulata, commonly known as the elegant jellyfish, is a recently discovered colonial hydrozoa found on the Pacific coast of Japan.

== Taxonomy ==
Tima nigroannulata is in the genus Tima and belongs to the order Leptothecata within the class Hydrozoa. Tima nigroannulata are a part of the family Eirenidae, that include colonial cnidarians like jellyfish, sea anemones, corals, hydras, and other related organisms. Due to the evolutionary relationships of Eirenidae needing more research, its closest relatives are unknown. There are other species of Tima that belong to the family Eirenidae that share a few morphological characteristics like the forming of a branched colony with hydrothecae. More research is needed to better understand its relationship to other species.

== Habitat and distribution ==
Tima has been found in various marine environments including warm, shallow tropical waters and the deep sea. Tima has been found in the Gulf of Mexico, Caribbean Sea, and the southeastern coast of the United States. T. nigroannulata was initially found in the shallow waters on the Pacific coast of Japan.

Tima nigroannulata is a species commonly found growing on rocks and shells as polyps and drifting through the water as medusae.

== Description ==
Tima nigroannulata is a small, gelatinous, marine animal that does not have distinctive or complex organs or tissue. It is a colonial hydrozoan, so it consists of multiple individual organisms zooid that form a large colony. Individual zooids are cylindrical in shape and small in size. T. nigroannulata is hemispherical, approximately the size of a human hand, and can have over 50 tentacles. Their bodies are translucent and has mesoglea that is found between two layers of living cells. T. nigroannulata has zooids with tentacles that are specialized for various functions like feeding, defense, reproduction and sensory perception to a certain degree.

The large colony has branches that are composed of various zooids that are arranged in a fan like pattern. Its name comes from the dark annular rings surrounding the base of each individual zooid that gives its rather pigment less body a distinctive look.

== Reproduction and life cycle ==
More research needs to be done to better understand the reproductive and life cycle of T. nigroannulata. Because T. nigroannulata was found from medusae, it is currently understood that their life cycle consists of both polyp and medusa stages. According to current literature, T. nigroannulata follows similar reproductive and life cycle like other hydrozoans. This begins with the release of gametes from the adult polyps into the water column. These gametes are fertilized to then become zygotes that develop into planula. The planula settles onto a hard substrate like a rock where it continues to develop into a small polyp that eventually becomes a large adult colony. Some of the polyps will metamorphizes into medusae which specialize in sexual reproduction by releasing gametes into the water, starting the process over. Those who remain polyps may undergo asexual reproduction through budding and polyp fission (fragmentation).

== Feeding ==
It is possible for T. nigroannulata to have similar dietary habits to other hydrozoans, but there is limited research on their diet specifically. Hydrozoans are diverse in their feeding habits. Some are filter feeders that consume particles from the water column while others utilize the tentacles of the zooid to trap small planktonic organisms like zooplankton. Based on literature, their predation may be influenced by the depth at which they are found as that effects the distribution and availability of prey.

Tima nigroannulata like other jellyfish provide a source of food to various predators making them a key component in benthic environments.

== Similar species ==
There are other species within the Tima genus. Many of them are understudied as they are fairly recent findings. When T. nigroannulata was discovered, it was initially believed to be another hydrozoan by the name of Tima formosa. The two hydroids look fairly similar and share characteristics of their class, but genetic testing proved that they are two distinct species.

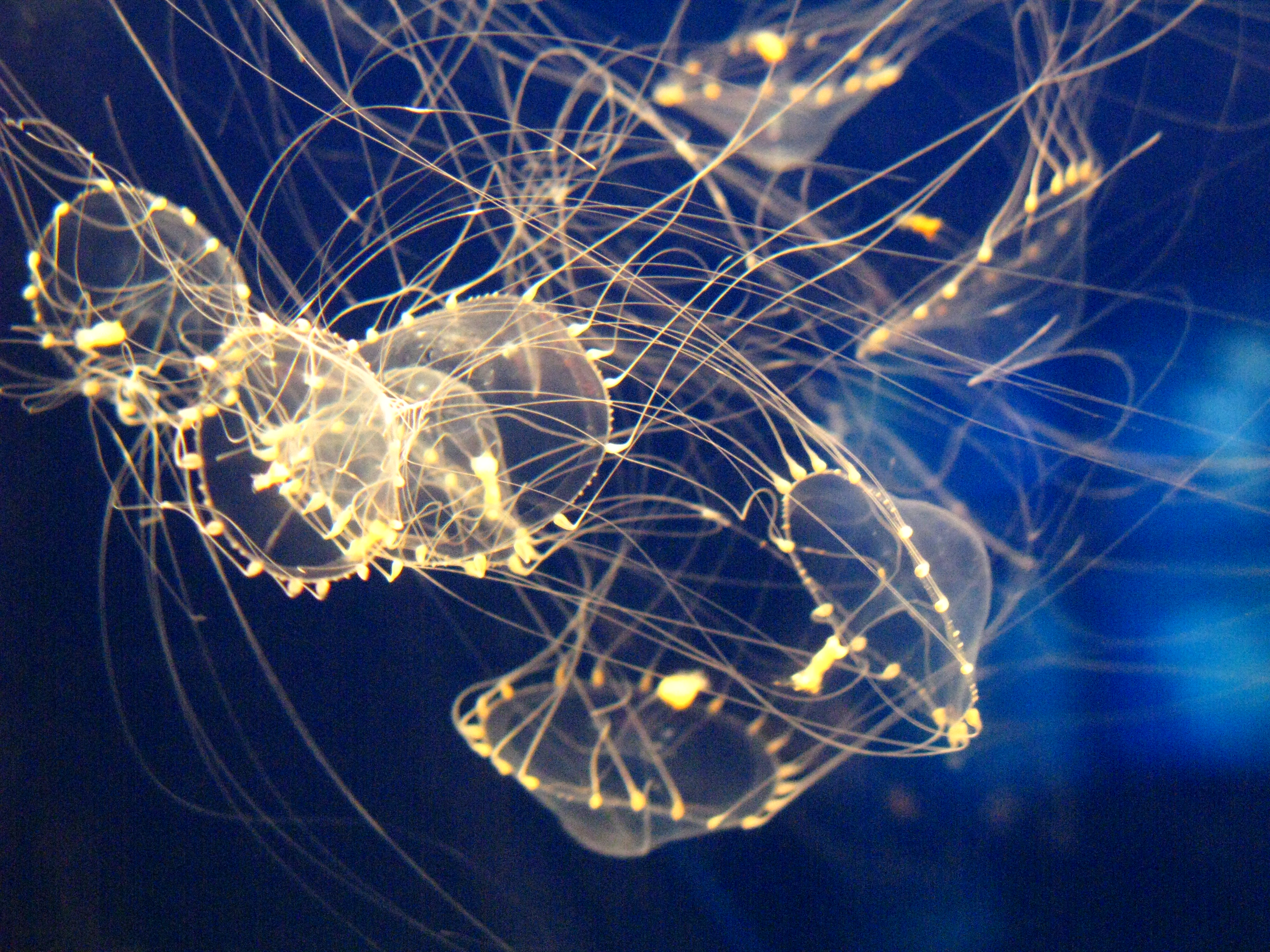
The jellyfish species, Tima formosa.
