= Neotima galeai =

Scientific classification
- Kingdom: Animalia
- Phylum: Cnidaria
- Class: Hydrozoa
- Order: Leptothecata
- Family: Eirenidae
- Genus: Neotima
- Species: N. galeai

Binomial name
- Neotima galeai Schuchert, 2017

Species of hydrozoan

Neotima galeai is a species of hydrozoan in the family Eirenidae. The holotype of this organism was collected in the Persian Gulf at a depth of 0 meters.

== Description ==
The bell of N. galeai has a diameter of 9-11 mm, and has 26-28 tentacles in pairs around it. The gonads are relatively thin.
