= Phialopsis =

Scientific classification
- Kingdom: Animalia
- Phylum: Cnidaria
- Class: Hydrozoa
- Order: Leptothecata
- Family: Eirenidae
- Genus: Phialopsis; Torrey, 1909

Genus of hydrozoans

Phialopsis is a genus of hydrozoans in the family Eirenidae.

== Species ==
The genus contains the following species:

- Phialopsis averruciformis Huang, Xu & Lin, 2013
- Phialopsis diegensis Torrey, 1909
