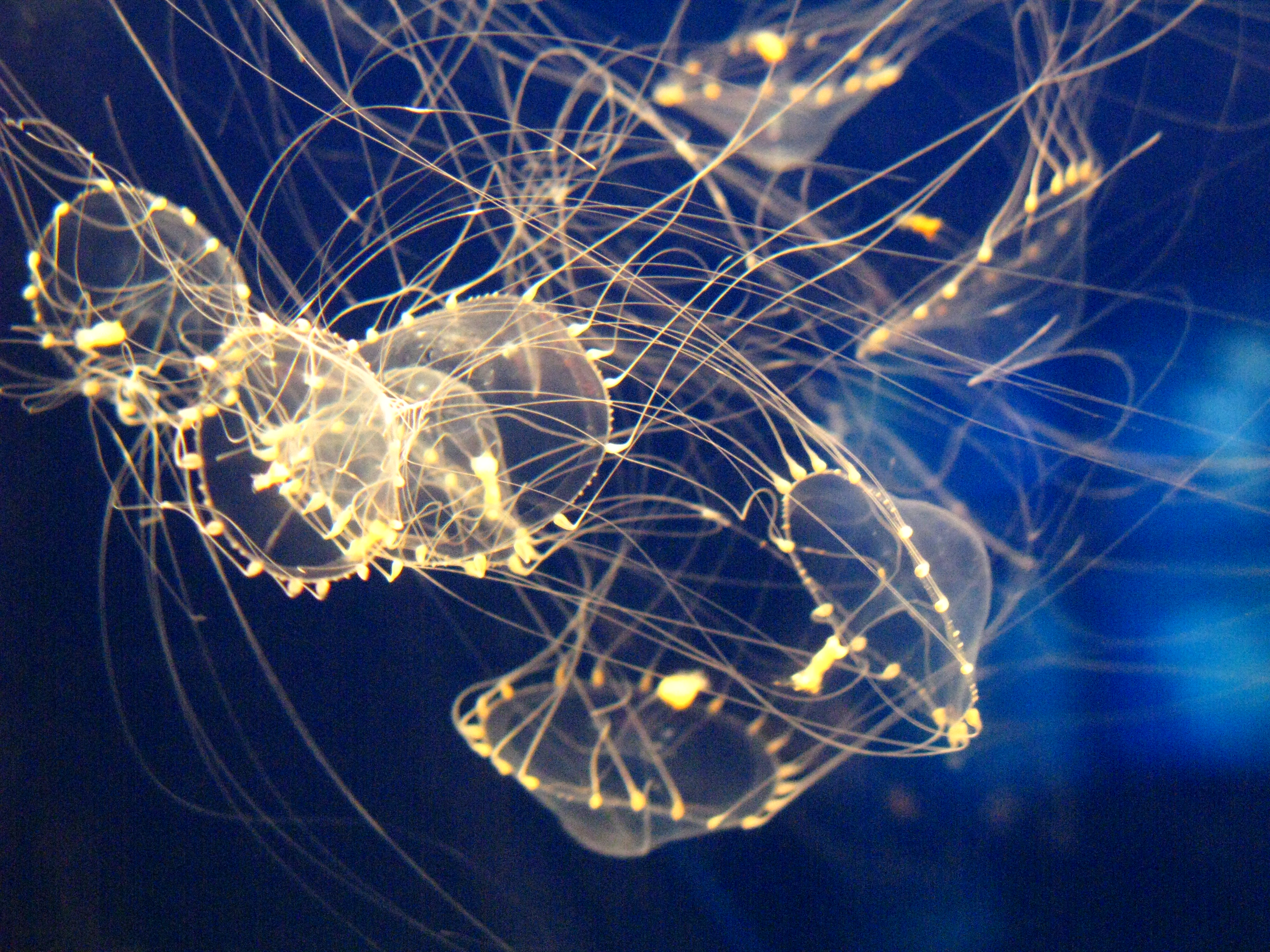
- Tima formosa

Scientific classification
- Kingdom: Animalia
- Phylum: Cnidaria
- Class: Hydrozoa
- Order: Leptothecata
- Family: Eirenidae
- Genus: Tima; Eschscholtz, 1829

= Tima (cnidarian) =

Genus of hydrozoans

Tima is a genus of hydrozoans in the family Eirenidae.

== Species ==
The genus contains the following species:

- Tima bairdii (Johnston, 1833)
- Tima flavilabris Eschscholtz, 1829
- Tima formosa L. Agassiz, 1862
- Tima nigroannulata Calder et al., 2021
- Tima saghalinensis Bigelow, 1913
