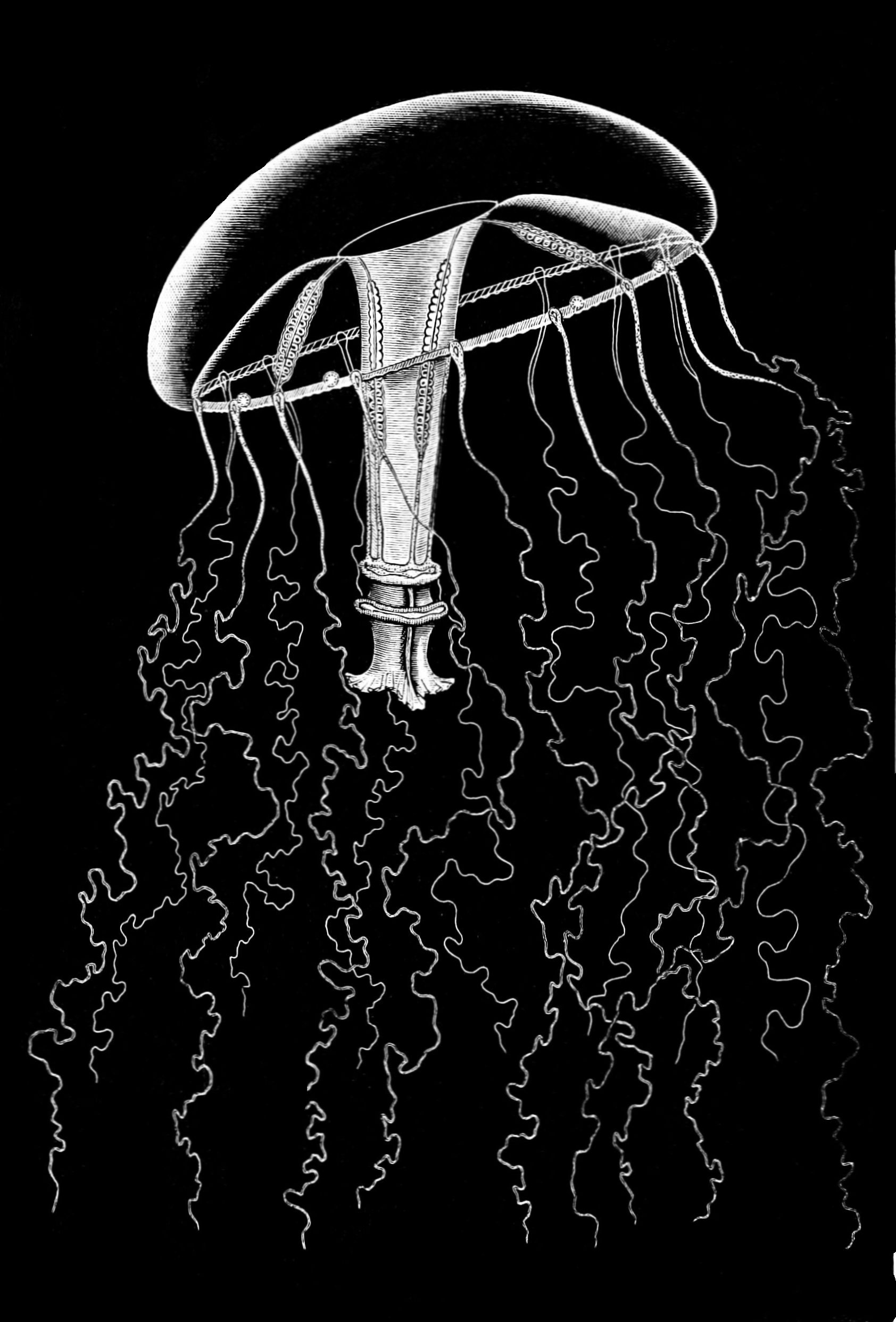
- Drawing of unknown member of Eutima
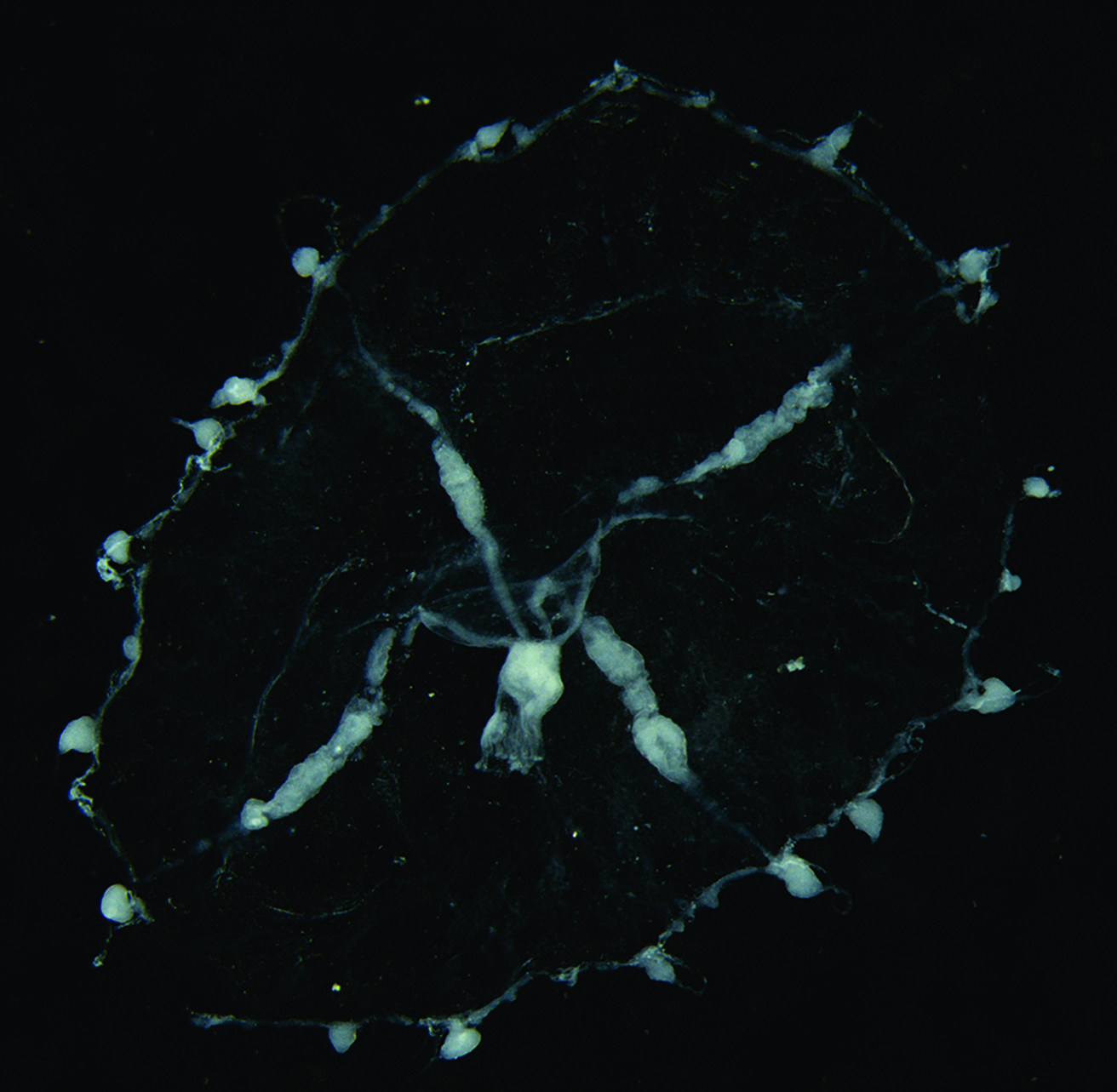
- Eutima marajoara

Scientific classification
- Kingdom: Animalia
- Phylum: Cnidaria
- Class: Hydrozoa
- Order: Leptothecata
- Family: Eirenidae
- Genus: Eutima; McCrady, 1859

Synonyms
- Eutima (Octorchis) Haeckel, 1864; Eutimeta Haeckel, 1879; Eutimium Haeckel, 1879; Goodsirea Wright, 1859; Halanthus Hadži, 1914; Liriopsis Claus, 1877; Octorchandra Haeckel, 1879; Octorchidium Haeckel, 1879; Octorchis Haeckel, 1864; Plancia Forbes & Goodsir, 1853; Siphonorhynchus Keferstein, 1862

= Eutima =

Genus of cnidarians

Eutima is a genus of hydrozoans in the family Eirenidae.

== Species ==
The genus contains the following species:

- Eutima cirrhifera Kakinuma, 1964
- Eutima coerulea Agassiz, 1862
- Eutima commensalis Santhakumari, 1970
- Eutima curva Browne, 1905
- Eutima diademata Kramp, 1959
- Eutima gegenbauri Haeckel, 1864
- Eutima gentiana Haeckel, 1879
- Eutima gracilis Forbes & Goodsir, 1853
- Eutima hartlaubi Kramp, 1958
- Eutima japonica Uchida, 1925
- Eutima levuka Agassiz & Mayer, 1899
- Eutima longigonia Bouillon, 1984
- Eutima marajoara Tosetto, Neumann-Leitão & Nogueira, 2020
- Eutima mira McCrady, 1859
- Eutima modesta Hartlaub, 1909
- Eutima mucosa Bouillon, 1984
- Eutima neucaledonia Uchida, 1964
- Eutima onahamaensis Toshino, Ishii & Mizutani, 2024
- Eutima orientalis Browne, 1905)
- Eutima ostrearum Mattox & Crowell, 1951
- Eutima sapinhoa Narchi & Hebling, 1975
- Eutima suzannae Allwein, 1967
- Eutima taiwanensis Xu, Huang & Guo, 2019
- Eutima variabilis McCrady, 1859
- Eutima suzannae Allwein, 1967
- Eutima curva Browne, 1905
- Eutima mira McCrady, 1859
- Eutima gracilis Forbes & Goodsir, 1853)
- Eutima diademata Kramp, 1959)
- Eutima cuculata Brooks, 1883
