= Irenium =

Scientific classification
- Kingdom: Animalia
- Phylum: Cnidaria
- Class: Hydrozoa
- Order: Leptothecata
- Family: Eirenidae
- Genus: Irenium; Haeckel, 1879

Genus of cnidarians

Irenium is a genus of hydrozoans in the family Eirenidae.

== Species ==
The genus contains the following species:

- Irenium alabiatum Zamponi, Suárez-Moreales & Gasca, 1999
- Irenium labiatum Zamponi, Suárez-Moreales & Gasca, 1999
- Irenium polynemum Huang, Xu & Guo, 2010
- Irenium quadrigatum Haeckel, 1879
- Irenium teuscheri Haeckel, 1879
