= Neotima =

Scientific classification
- Kingdom: Animalia
- Phylum: Cnidaria
- Class: Hydrozoa
- Order: Leptothecata
- Family: Eirenidae
- Genus: Neotima; Petersen, 1962

Genus of cnidarians

Neotima is a genus of hydrozoans in the family Eirenidae.

== Species ==
The genus contains the following species:

- Neotima galeai Schuchert, 2017
- Neotima lucullana Delle Chiaje, 1823
- Neotima peterseni Bouillon, 1984
