= Eugymnanthea =

Scientific classification
- Kingdom: Animalia
- Phylum: Cnidaria
- Class: Hydrozoa
- Order: Leptothecata
- Family: Eirenidae
- Genus: Eugymnanthea; Palombi, 1936

Synonyms
- Anthohydra Salvini Plawen & Rao, 1973; Mytilhydra Cerruti, 1941; Ostreohydra Yamada, 1950

Genus of cnidarians

Eugymnanthea is a genus of hydrozoans in the family Eirenidae.

== Species ==
The genus contains the following species:

- Eugymnanthea inquilina Palombi, 1936
- Eugymnanthea japonica Yamada, 1950
- Eugymnanthea psammobionta Salvini-Plawen & Rao, 1973
