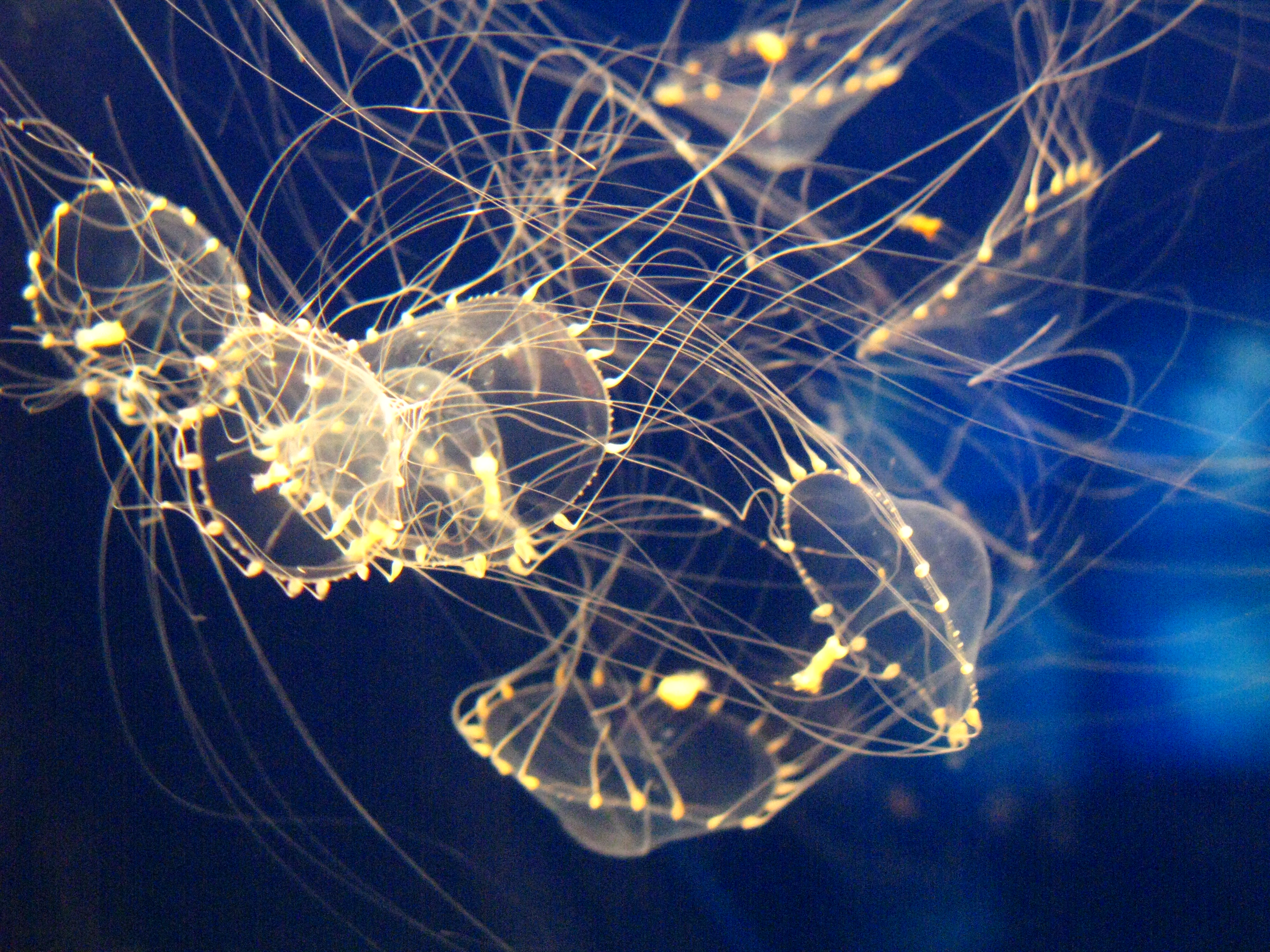

Scientific classification
- Kingdom: Animalia
- Phylum: Cnidaria
- Class: Hydrozoa
- Order: Leptothecata
- Family: Eirenidae
- Genus: Tima
- Species: T. formosa

Binomial name
- Tima formosa L. Agassiz, 1862

= Tima formosa =

Species of hydrozoan

Tima formosa or Small Fringed Jellyfish is a colonial species of marine hydrozoan in the family Eirenidae. They live in northern parts of the Atlantic Ocean, in the upper epipelagic zone.

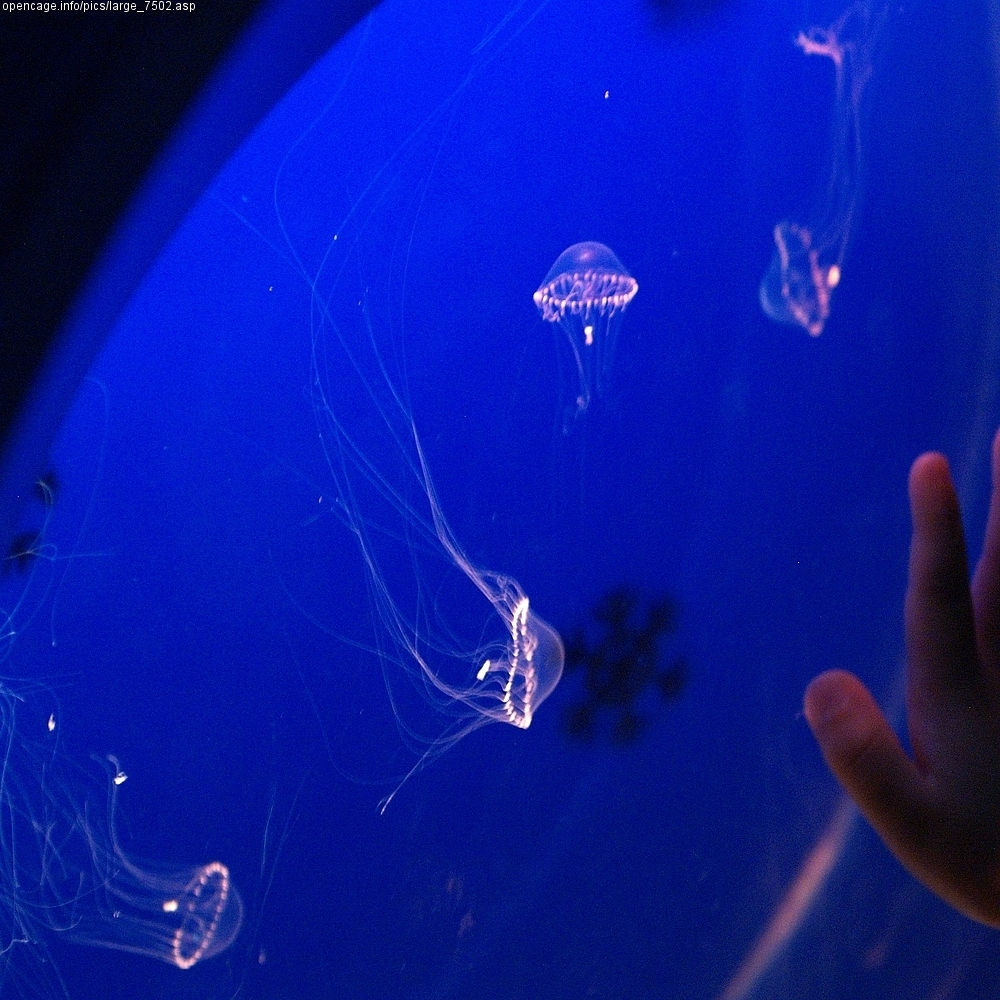

It is also the name of a 2010 album by musical artist Oren Ambarchi with Jim O'Rourke and Keiji Haino (Black Truffle).
