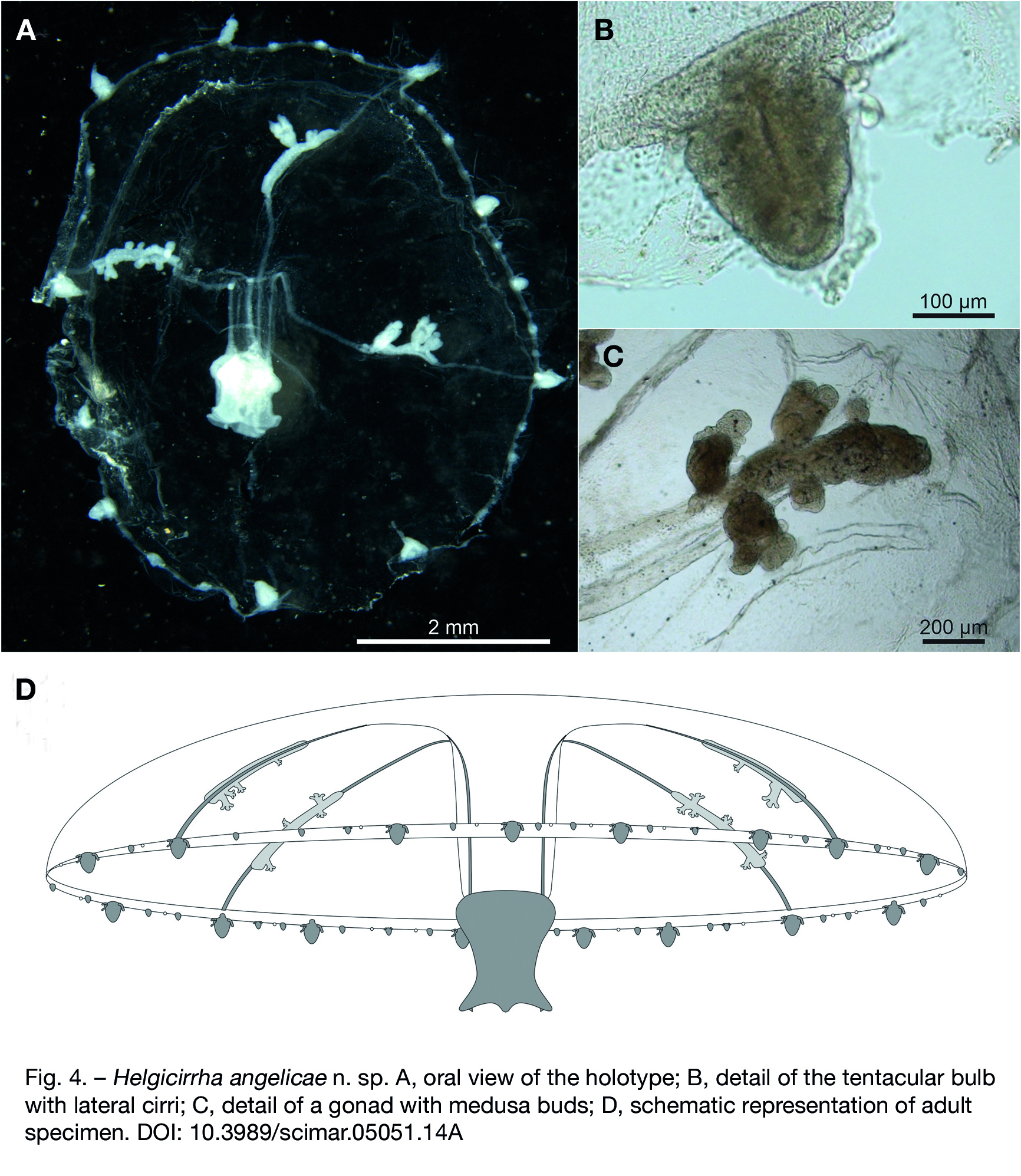

Scientific classification
- Kingdom: Animalia
- Phylum: Cnidaria
- Class: Hydrozoa
- Order: Leptothecata
- Family: Eirenidae
- Genus: Helgicirrha; Hartlaub, 1909

= Helgicirrha =

Genus of cnidarians

Helgicirrha is a genus of hydrozoans in the family Eirenidae.

== Species ==
The genus contains the following species:

- Helgicirrha angelicae Tosetto, Neumann-Leitão & Nogueira, 2020
- Helgicirrha brevistyla Xu & Huang, 1983
- Helgicirrha cari Haeckel, 1864)
- Helgicirrha cornelii Bouillon, 1984
- Helgicirrha danduensis Bigelow, 1904
- Helgicirrha gemmifera Bouillon, 1984
- Helgicirrha irregularis Bouillon, Boero & Seghers, 1988
- Helgicirrha malayensis Stiasny, 1928
- Helgicirrha medusifera Bigelow, 1909
- Helgicirrha ovalis Huang, Xu, Lin & Guo, 2010
- Helgicirrha sinuata Xu, Huang & Du, 2012
- Helgicirrha weaveri Allwein, 1967
- Helgicirrha cari Haeckel, 1864
- Helgicirrha sinuata Xu, Huang & Du, 2012
