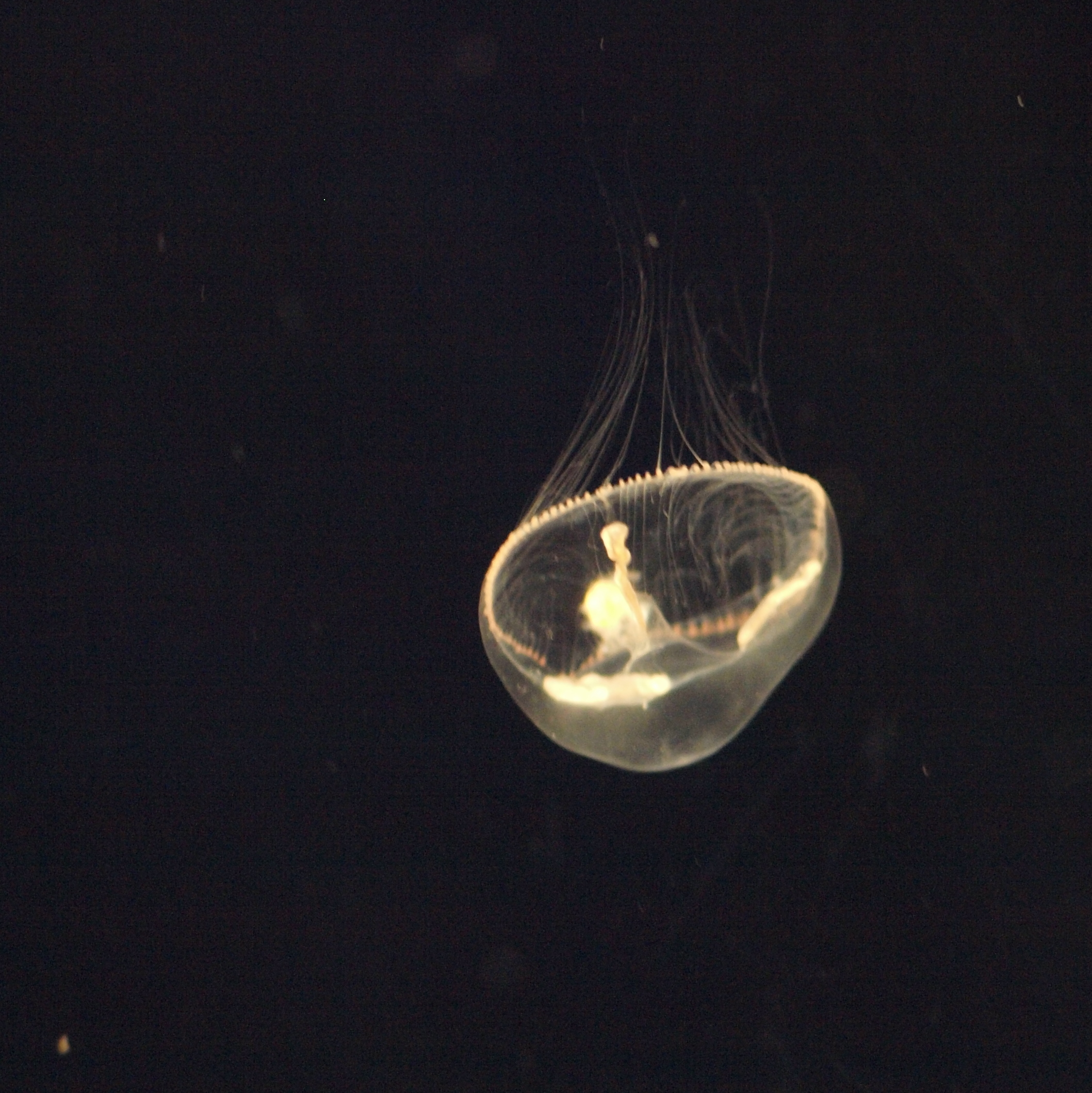
- Eutonina indicans

Scientific classification
- Domain: Eukaryota
- Kingdom: Animalia
- Phylum: Cnidaria
- Class: Hydrozoa
- Order: Leptothecata
- Family: Eirenidae
- Genus: Eutonina; Hartlaub, 1897

= Eutonina =

Genus of aquatic animals

Eutonina is a genus of cnidarians belonging to the family Eirenidae.

The species of this genus are found in Europe and Northern America.

Species:

- Eutonina indicans (Romanes, 1876)
- Eutonina scintillans (Bigelow, 1909)
