= Eutimalphes =

Scientific classification
- Kingdom: Animalia
- Phylum: Cnidaria
- Class: Hydrozoa
- Order: Leptothecata
- Family: Eirenidae
- Genus: Eutimalphes; Haeckel, 1879

Genus of cnidarians

Eutimalphes is a genus of hydrozoans in the family Eirenidae.

== Species ==
The genus contains the following species:

- Eutimalphes brownei Torrey, 1909
- Eutimalphes pretiosa Haeckel, 1879
