= Eirene (cnidarian) =

Scientific classification
- Kingdom: Animalia
- Phylum: Cnidaria
- Class: Hydrozoa
- Order: Leptothecata
- Family: Eirenidae
- Genus: Eirene; Eschscholtz, 1829

Synonyms
- Campanopsis Claus, 1881; Geryonopsis Forbes, 1848; Irene Haeckel, 1879 [lapsus]; Irenopsis Goette, 1886; Phortis McCrady, 1859

Genus of cnidarians

Eirene is a genus of hydrozoans in the family Eirenidae.

== Species ==
The genus contains the following species:

- Eirene averuciformis Du, Xu, Huang & Guo, 2010
- Eirene brevigona Kramp, 1959
- Eirene brevistyloides Du, Xu, Huang & Guo, 2010
- Eirene brevistylus Huang & Xu, 1994
- Eirene ceylonensis Browne, 1905
- Eirene conica Du, Xu, Huang & Guo, 2010
- Eirene elliceana (Agassiz & Mayer, 1902)
- Eirene gibbosa (McCrady, 1859)
- Eirene hexanemalis (Goette, 1886)
- Eirene kambara Agassiz & Mayer, 1899
- Eirene lactea (Mayer, 1900)
- Eirene lacteoides Kubota & Horita, 1992
- Eirene menoni Kramp, 1953
- Eirene mollis Torrey, 1909
- Eirene palkensis Browne, 1905
- Eirene parvitentaculata Bouillon, 1984
- Eirene pentanemalis Lin, Xu & Huang, 2013
- Eirene proboscidea Bouillon & Barnett, 1999
- Eirene pyramidalis (Agassiz, 1862)
- Eirene tenuis (Browne, 1905)
- Eirene troglodyta Watson, 1998
- Eirene viridula (Péron & Lesueur, 1810)
- Eirene xiamenensis Huang, Xu & Lin, 2010
