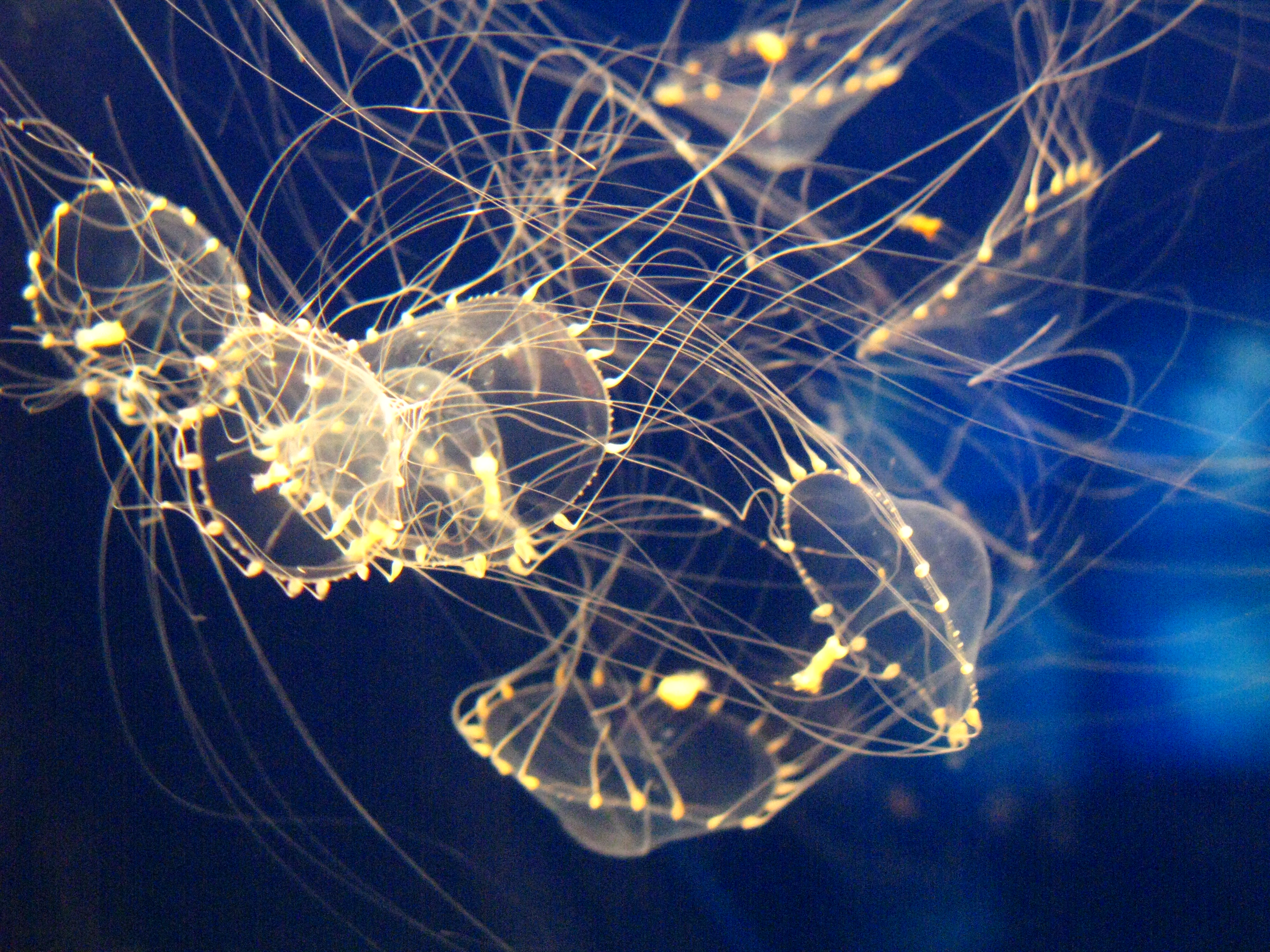
- Tima formosa

Scientific classification
- Kingdom: Animalia
- Phylum: Cnidaria
- Class: Hydrozoa
- Order: Leptothecata
- Family: Eirenidae; Haeckel, 1879

Synonyms
- Eutimidae Haeckel, 1879; Irenidae Haeckel, 1879

= Eirenidae =

Family of hydrozoans

Eirenidae is a family of hydrozoans.

== Genera ==
The following genera are recognized within the family Eirenidae:

- Eirene Eschscholtz, 1829
- Eugymnanthea Palombi, 1936
- Eutima McCrady, 1859
- Eutimalphes Haeckel, 1879
- Eutonina Hartlaub, 1897
- Helgicirrha Hartlaub, 1909
- Irenium Haeckel, 1879
- Neotima Petersen, 1962
- Phialopsis Torrey, 1909
- Tima Eschscholtz, 1829
