= Abietinella operculata =

Scientific classification
- Domain: Eukaryota
- Kingdom: Animalia
- Phylum: Cnidaria
- Class: Hydrozoa
- Order: Leptothecata
- Family: Zygophylacidae
- Genus: Abietinella; Levinsen, 1913
- Species: A. operculata

Binomial name
- Abietinella operculata (Jäderholm, 1903)

Genus of cnidarians

Abietinella is a monotypic genus of cnidarians belonging to the family Zygophylacidae. The only species is Abietinella operculata.

The species is found in near Antarctica.
