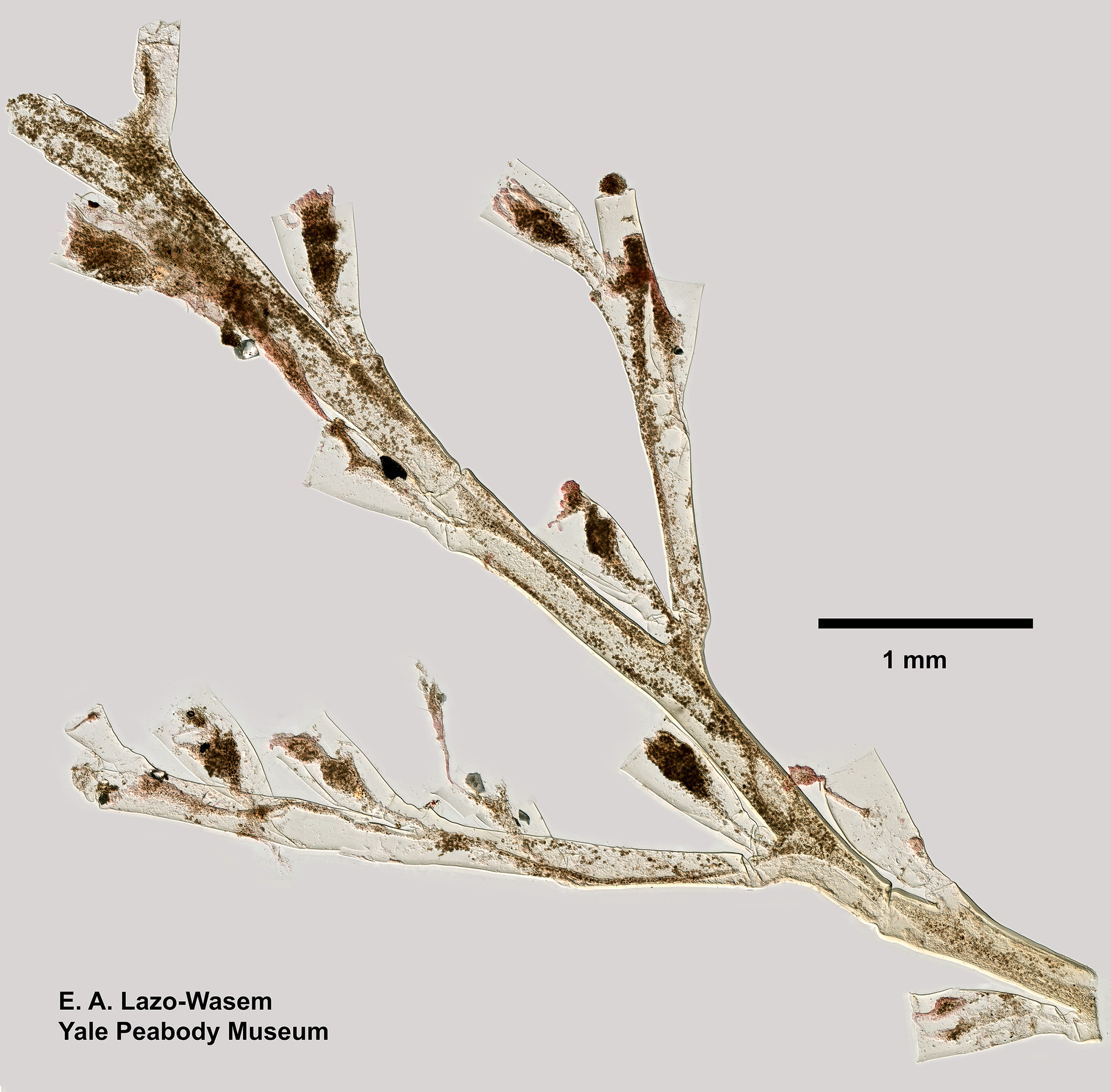

Scientific classification
- Domain: Eukaryota
- Kingdom: Animalia
- Phylum: Cnidaria
- Class: Hydrozoa
- Order: Leptothecata
- Family: Zygophylacidae
- Genus: Zygophylax
- Species: Z. pinnata

Binomial name
- Zygophylax pinnata (G.O. Sars, 1874)

Synonyms
- Halecium robustum Verrill, 1873; Lafoea halecioides Allman, 1874; Lafoea pinnata G.O. Sars, 1874; Lictorella halecioides (Allman, 1874); Lictorella pinnata (G.O. Sars, 1874); Lictorella pinnata var. annelata Pictet & Bedot, 1900

= Zygophylax pinnata =

Species of cnidaria

Zygophylax pinnata is a species of cnidaria in the family Zygophylacidae. The species is carnivorous. Individuals can get up to 270 μm. They also reproduce asexually.

The species occurs in northern parts of the Atlantic Ocean, the western parts of Indian Ocean, and the Arctic Ocean. In the Barents Sea the species occurs in the bathyal zone in low temperatures.
