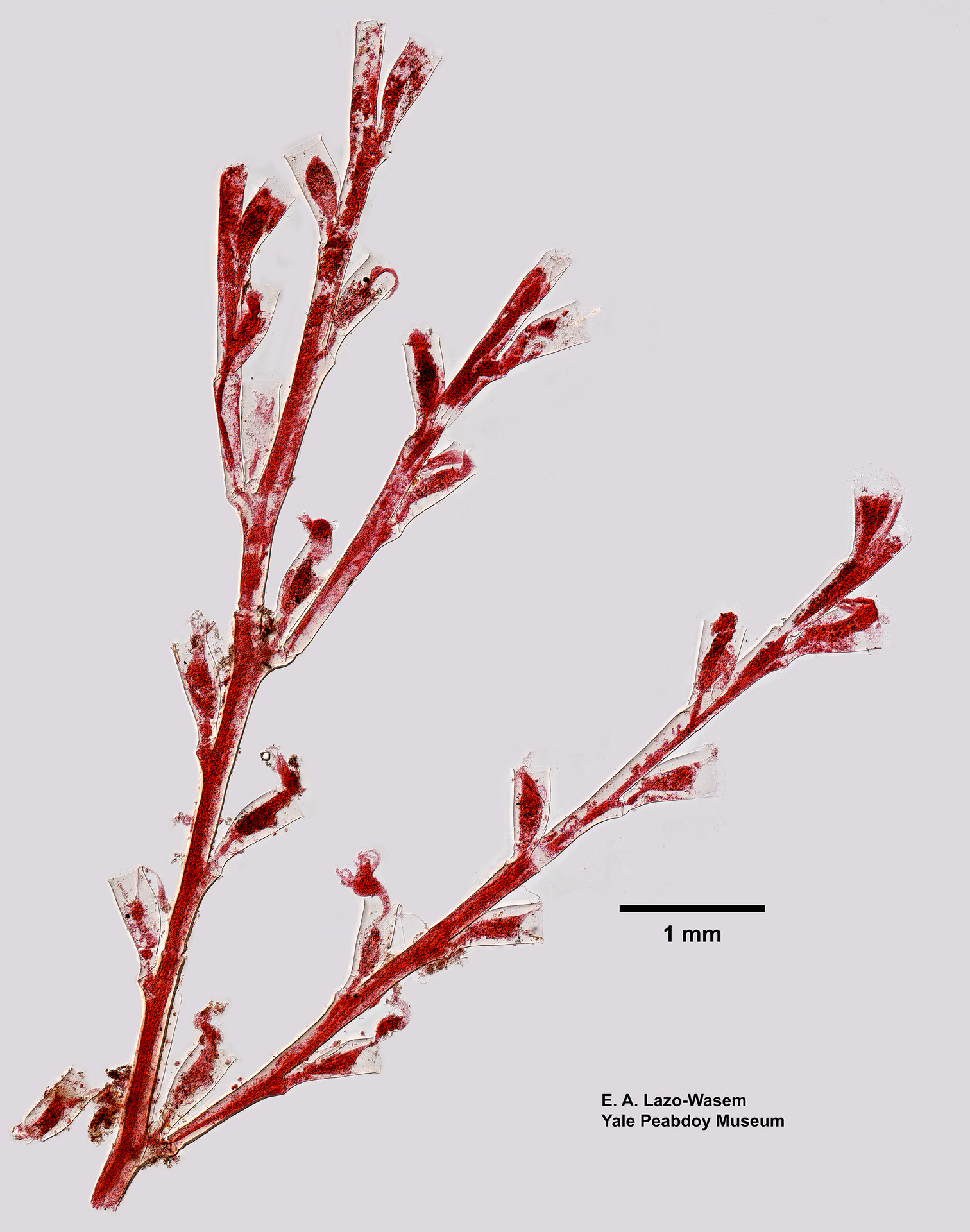

Scientific classification
- Domain: Eukaryota
- Kingdom: Animalia
- Phylum: Cnidaria
- Class: Hydrozoa
- Order: Leptothecata
- Family: Zygophylacidae
- Genus: Zygophylax; Quelch, 1885

= Zygophylax =

Genus of hydrozoans

Zygophylax is a genus of cnidarians belonging to the family Zygophylacidae.

They reproduce asexually and are carnivores.

The genus has almost cosmopolitan distribution.

== Species ==
Species:

- Zygophylax abyssicola (Stechow, 1926)
- Zygophylax adhaerens (Fraser, 1938)
- Zygophylax africana Stechow, 1923
- Zygophylax antipathes (Lamarck, 1816)
- Zygophylax arborescens Leloup, 1931
- Zygophylax armata (Ritchie, 1907)
- Zygophylax bathyphila Leloup, 1940
- Zygophylax biarmata Billard, 1905
- Zygophylax bifurcata Billard, 1942
- Zygophylax binematophoratus Vervoort & Watson, 2003
- Zygophylax brevitheca Jäderholm, 1919
- Zygophylax brownei Billard, 1924
- Zygophylax carolina (Fraser, 1911)
- Zygophylax cervicornis (Nutting, 1906)
- Zygophylax concinna (Ritchie, 1911)
- Zygophylax convallaria (Allman, 1877)
- Zygophylax crassicaulis(Fraser, 1943)
- Zygophylax crassitheca(Fraser, 1941)
- Zygophylax crozetensis Millard, 1977
- Zygophylax curvithecaStechow, 1913
- Zygophylax cyathifera (Allman, 1888)
- Zygophylax dispersa Peña Cantero, 2020
- Zygophylax echinata Calder & Vervoort, 1998
- Zygophylax elongata Ramil & Vervoort, 1992
- Zygophylax encarnae Peña Cantero, 2020
- Zygophylax geminocarpaMillard, 1958
- Zygophylax geniculata (Clarke, 1894)
- Zygophylax infundibulum Millard, 1958
- Zygophylax kakaiba Campos, Marques, Puce & Pérez, 2016
- Zygophylax kurilensis Antsulevich, 1988
- Zygophylax laertesi Peña Cantero, 2020
- Zygophylax leloupi Ramil & Vervoort, 1992
- Zygophylax levinseni (Saemundsson, 1911)
- Zygophylax medeae Peña Cantero, 2020
- Zygophylax millardae Rees & Vervoort, 1987
- Zygophylax naomiae Campos, Pérez, Puce & Marques, 2020
- Zygophylax niger Galea, 2019
- Zygophylax niobae Peña Cantero, 2020
- Zygophylax pacifica Stechow, 1920
- Zygophylax parabiarmata Vervoort, 2006
- Zygophylax parapacificus Vervoort & Watson, 2003
- Zygophylax pinnata (G.O. Sars, 1874)
- Zygophylax polycarpa Vervoort & Watson, 2003
- Zygophylax profunda Quelch, 1885
- Zygophylax pseudafricanus Vervoort & Watson, 2003
- Zygophylax pseudoabietinella Peña Cantero, 2020
- Zygophylax reflexa (Fraser, 1948)
- Zygophylax robustus (Verrill, 1873)
- Zygophylax rufa (Bale, 1884)
- Zygophylax sagamiensis Hirohito, 1983
- Zygophylax sibogae Billard, 1918
- Zygophylax stechowi (Jäderholm, 1919)
- Zygophylax tizardensis Kirkpatrick, 1890
- Zygophylax tottoni Rees & Vervoort, 1987
- Zygophylax unilateralis Totton, 1930
- Zygophylax valdiviae Stechow, 1923
- Zygophylax elegans (Fewkes, 1881)
- Zygophylax junceoides (Borradaile, 1905)
- Zygophylax recta Jarvis, 1922
- Zygophylax chazaliei (Versluys, 1899)
- Zygophylax convallarius (Allman, 1877)
- Zygophylax elegantula Leloup, 1940
- Zygophylax grandis Vanhöffen, 1910
- Zygophylax inconstans Millard, 1977
- Zygophylax operculata Jäderholm, 1903
- Zygophylax rigida (Fraser, 1948)
