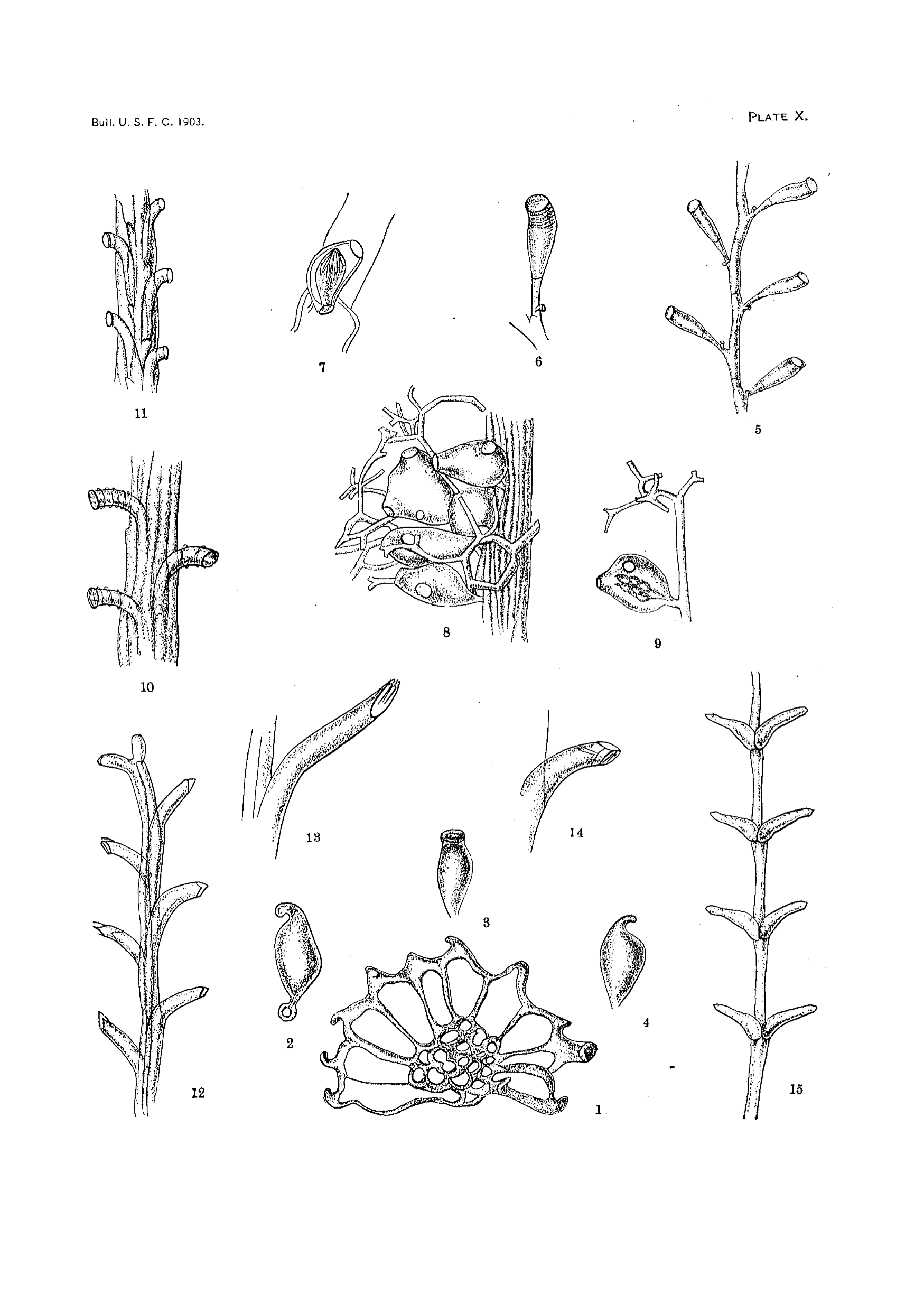
- Hydroids of the Hawaiian Islands collected by the steamer Albatross in 1902 in Bulletin of the United States Fish Commission for 1903, vol. 23, Nutting, 1906

Scientific classification
- Domain: Eukaryota
- Kingdom: Animalia
- Phylum: Cnidaria
- Class: Hydrozoa
- Order: Leptothecata
- Family: Zygophylacidae
- Genus: Cryptolaria; Busk, 1857

Species
- See text

Synonyms
- Eucryptolaria Fraser, 1938; Euperisiphonia Fraser, 1942; Perisiphonia Allman, 1888

= Cryptolaria =

Genus of cnidarians

Cryptolaria is a genus of hydrozoans in the family Zygophylacidae.

== Species ==
The following species are recognized in the genus:

- Cryptolaria exserta Busk, 1858
- Cryptolaria pectinata (Allman, 1888)
- Cryptolaria prima Busk, 1858
- Cryptolaria rigida (Fraser, 1942)
- Cryptolaria spinosa Millard, 1980
