= Zygophylacidae =

Scientific classification
- Kingdom: Animalia
- Phylum: Cnidaria
- Class: Hydrozoa
- Order: Leptothecata
- Family: Zygophylacidae; Quelch, 1885

Family of hydrozoans

Zygophylacidae is a family of hydrozoans.

== Genera ==
The following genera are recognized in the family Zygophylacidae:

- Abietinella Levinsen, 1913
- Cryptolaria Busk, 1857
- Zygophylax Quelch, 1885
