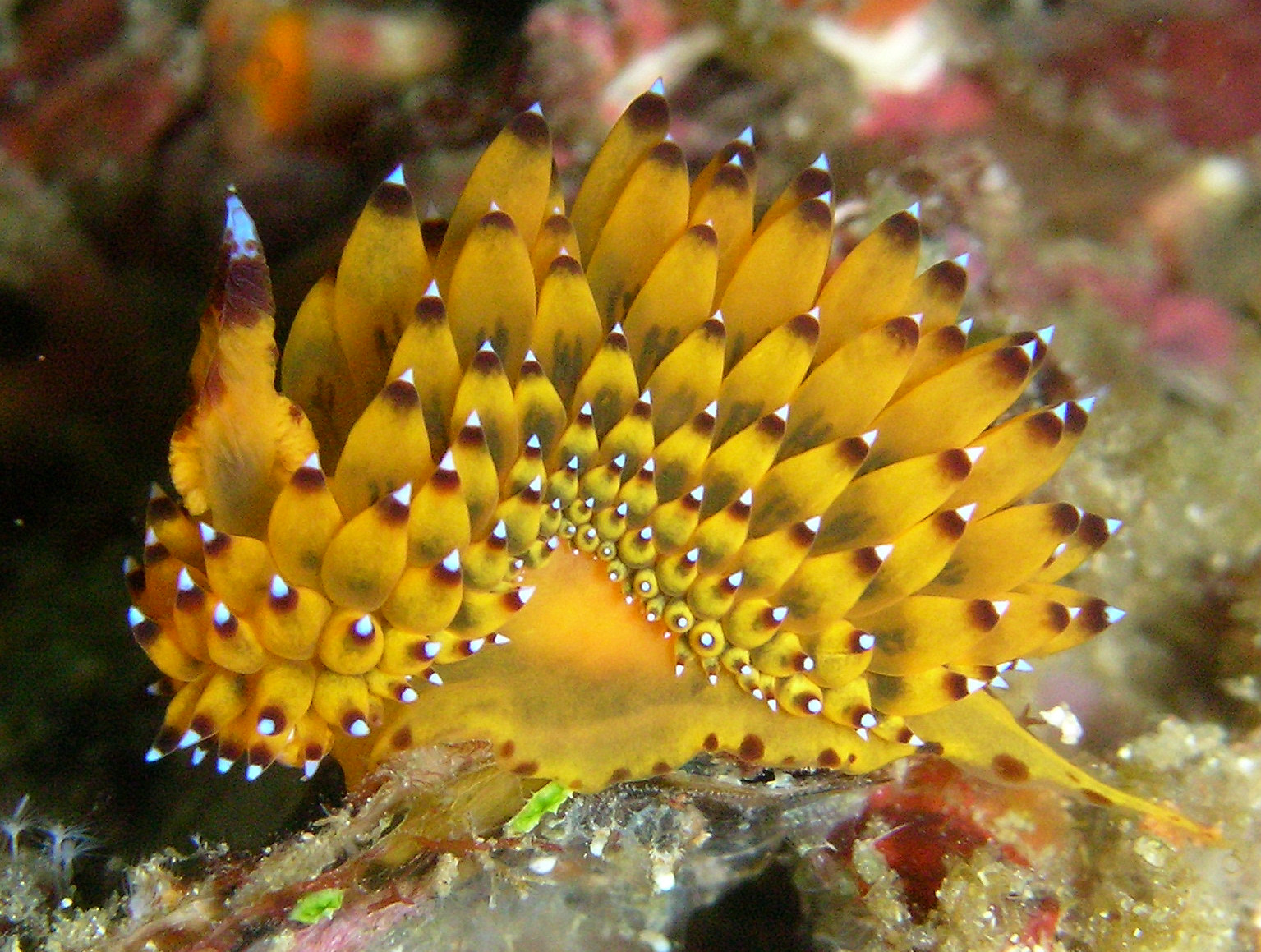

Scientific classification
- Kingdom: Animalia
- Phylum: Mollusca
- Class: Gastropoda
- Order: Nudibranchia
- Suborder: Cladobranchia
- Family: Janolidae
- Genus: Janolus; Bergh, 1884

Type species
- Janolus australis Bergh, 1884

Species
- See text

Synonyms
- Janus Vérany, 1844 (invalid: junior homonym of Janus Stephens, 1829 [Hymenoptera])

= Janolus =

Genus of gastropods

Janolus is a genus of small to large sea slugs, or more accurately nudibranchs, marine gastropod mollusks, in the family Janolidae. The name Janolus is derived from the two-headed god Janus, in ancient Roman mythology.

== Description ==
Adult individuals of Janolus species can be between 2.5 cm to 8 cm long, depending on the species. They are semi-translucent and the body is covered in short cerata.

== Distribution ==
Janolus species are found in many areas world-wide, including Europe, Australia, Japan and Africa.

== Ecology ==
=== Habitat ===
This genus of nudibranch is found in shallow and subtidal waters.

=== Feeding habits ===
Janolus species feed on Bryozoa, moss animals.

=== Predators ===
In California, Navanax is a known predator of Janolus. Navanax tracks the slime of Janolus by using chemoreceptors. When Janolus is about to be caught, it rolls into a ball, leaving its cerata exposed.

== Species ==
Species in the genus Janolus include:

- Janolus anulatus Camacho-Garcia & Gosliner, 2006
- Janolus australis Bergh, 1884
- Janolus chilensis M.A. Fischer, Cervera & Ortea, 1997
- Janolus comis Er. Marcus, 1955
- Janolus eximius Miller & Willan, 1986
- Janolus faustoi Ortea & Llera, 1988
- Janolus flavoanulatus Pola & Gosliner, 2019
- Janolus hyalinus (Alder and Hancock, 1854)
- Janolus ignis Miller & Willan, 1986
- Janolus incrustans Pola & Gosliner, 2019
- Janolus kinoi Edmunds & Carmona, 2017
- Janolus mirabilis Baba & Abe, 1970
- Janolus mokohinau Miller & Willan, 1986
- Janolus mucloc (Er. Marcus, 1958)
- Janolus rebeccae Schrödl, 1996
- Janolus savinkini Martynov & Korshunova, 2012
- Janolus toyamensis Baba & Abe, 1970
- Janolus tricellariodes Pola & Gosliner, 2019

Species brought into synonymy

- Janolus barbarensis (J. G. Cooper, 1863):synonym of Antiopella barbarensis (J. G. Cooper, 1863)
- Janolus capensis Bergh, 1907:synonym of Antiopella capensis (Bergh, 1907) (original combination)
- Janolus costacubensis Ortea & Espinosa, 2000:synonym of Janolus comis Er. Marcus, 1955
- Janolus cristatus (Delle Chiaje, 1841):synonym of Antiopella cristata (Delle Chiaje, 1841)
- Janolus flagellatus Eliot, 1906:synonym of Janolus hyalinus (Alder & Hancock, 1854) (dubious synonym)
- Janolus fuscus O'Donoghue, 1924:synonym of Antiopella fusca (O'Donoghue, 1924) (original combination)
- Janolus longidentatus Gosliner, 1981:synonym of Antiopella longidentata (Gosliner, 1981) (original combination)
- Janolus nakaza (Gosliner, 1981):synonym of Bonisa nakaza Gosliner, 1981
- Janolus novozealandicus (Eliot, 1907):synonym of Antiopella novozealandica Eliot, 1907
- Janolus praeclarus (Bouchet, 1975):synonym of Antiopella praeclara Bouchet, 1975
