= Paralicornia obtecta =

Scientific classification
- Kingdom: Animalia
- Phylum: Bryozoa
- Class: Gymnolaemata
- Order: Cheilostomatida
- Family: Candidae
- Genus: Paralicornia
- Species: P. obtecta

Binomial name
- Paralicornia obtecta Haswell, 1880

Synonyms
- Scrupocellaria obtecta Haswell, 1880

Species of bryozoa

Paralicornia obtecta is a species of bryozoan, found in Australian waters. It has an avicularium with three protrusions, a feature also found in Paralicornia hamata and Paralicornia sinuosa.
