= Janolus flavoanulatus =

Scientific classification
- Kingdom: Animalia
- Phylum: Mollusca
- Class: Gastropoda
- Order: Nudibranchia
- Suborder: Cladobranchia
- Family: Janolidae
- Genus: Janolus
- Species: J. flavoanulatus

Binomial name
- Janolus flavoanulatus Pola & Gosliner, 2019

Species of gastropod

Janolus flavoanulatus is a sea slug species. The specific name is derived from Latin words flavus (“yellow”) and anulatus (“ringed”). These soft-bodied mollusks are known for their extraordinary colors and prominent forms. The first description of this species was reported by researcher Terry Gosliner, a leading researcher in the evolutionary history of nudibranchs. Upon his conducted research in the Philippines, Gosliner named Janolus flavoanulatus for its yellow ring around its cerata.

== Distribution ==
The presence of this species has been found in regions of Indian and Western Pacific oceans, the Philippines, Papua New Guinea, Japan, Solomon Islands, Red Sea, Indonesia, Vanuatu, Indonesia, and Australia. Although the global population of J. flavoanulatus is unassigned, researchers are drawing observations that suggest these species are becoming scarce due to the decline in biodiversity.

== Habitat and ecology ==
The genus of Janolus resides in fluctuating temperatures within shallow, subtidal water levels and can even be identified far beneath the ocean surface. Those that inhabit areas closer to the surface are considered to be in an ideal photic zone that yields a stable and illuminated environment for marine mammals. Habitat loss and pollution possess great threats to these marine animals.

=== Diet ===
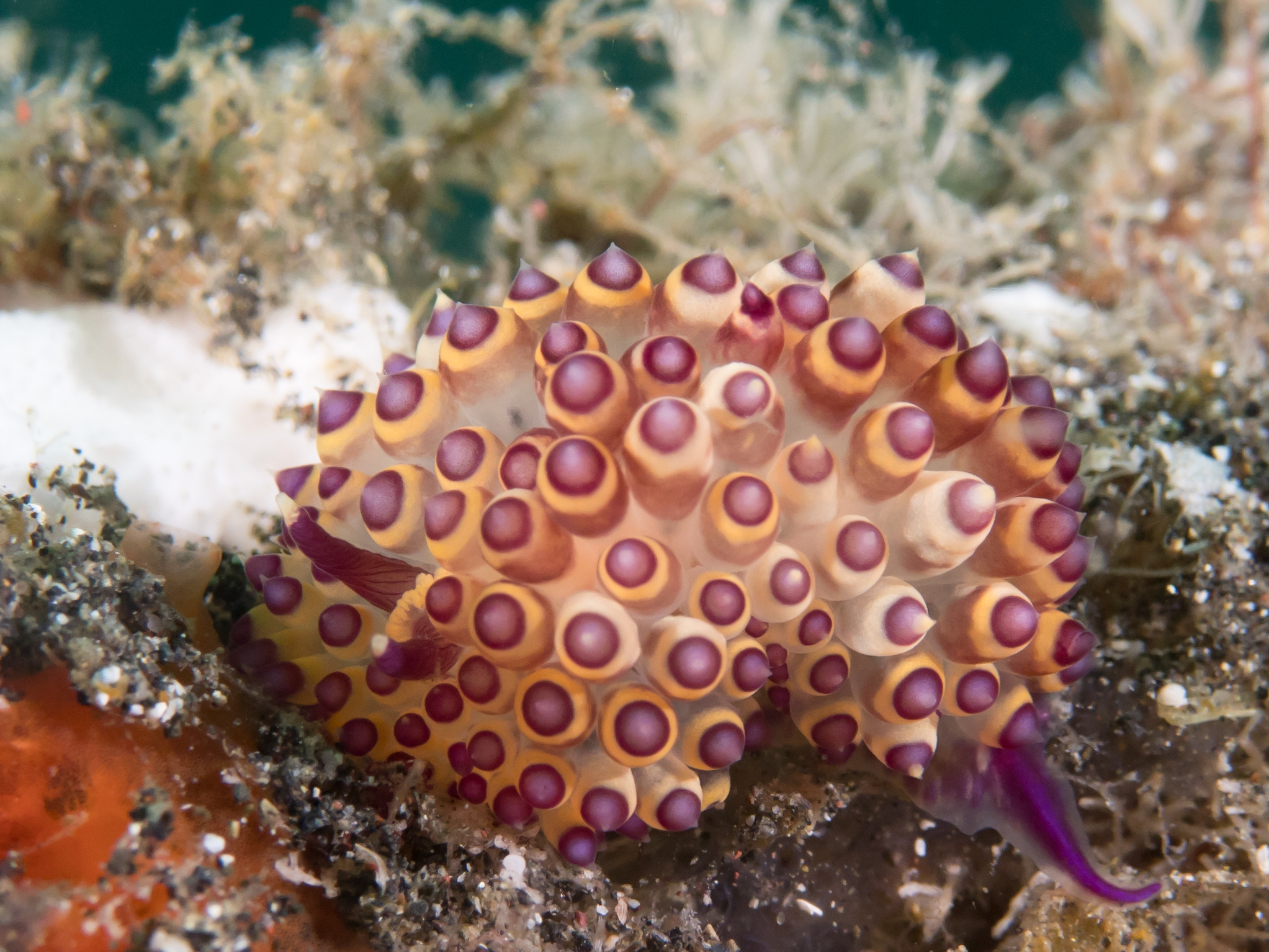
Up-close image of the intricate anatomy of Janolus flavoanulatus.

Such species feed on moss animals such as Bryozoa, which are filter feeders to these invertebrate Janolus’. These nudibranchs use a radula which allows them to scrape prey off of rocks that they may be attached to. The meticulous diet of Janolus flavoanulatus has been known to influence their bright colors. In addition to grazing on coral reefs in efforts to acquire algae, these flamboyant marine species are carnivorous animals that feed on the decaying biological matter on the ocean floor, essentially benefiting the rest of the marine environment in which they inhabit.

== Morphology ==
Janolus flavoanulatus are shell-less, elongated mollusks that reach about 50mm in length. Displaying numerous round pointed papillae which exhibit striking forms and colors. These nudibranchs are bilaterally symmetric externally and display their female and male openings on the side of their soft bodies. They lack a mantle cavity, which covers the visceral mass, but contain a simple gut and radula. Right behind the rhinophores, are two eyes and a pair of finger-like oral tentacles that reach out from either side of its head. Such structures serve as crucial anatomical features for their sense of the world.

Janolus flavoanulatus are distinguishable by their unique coloring. They have translucent white bodies and cerata. The tips of the cerata are violet purple with a bright blue apex. Below the purple subapical ring are an additional yellow and brown rings. Their rhinophores are brownish-purple with white tips, also displaying their caruncle as a pale color. Their foot has a slight blue lining.

== Predators ==
Due to their stationary nature and physical anatomy, these species are frequently exposed making them a popular prey for neighboring marine animals. Predators to these species include Navanax inermis. Although lacking visual recognition, it searches for prey using chemoreceptors, allowing them to trace the slime of these sea slugs. Other threats to J. flavoanulatus include other animals such as lobsters, fish, and even humans.

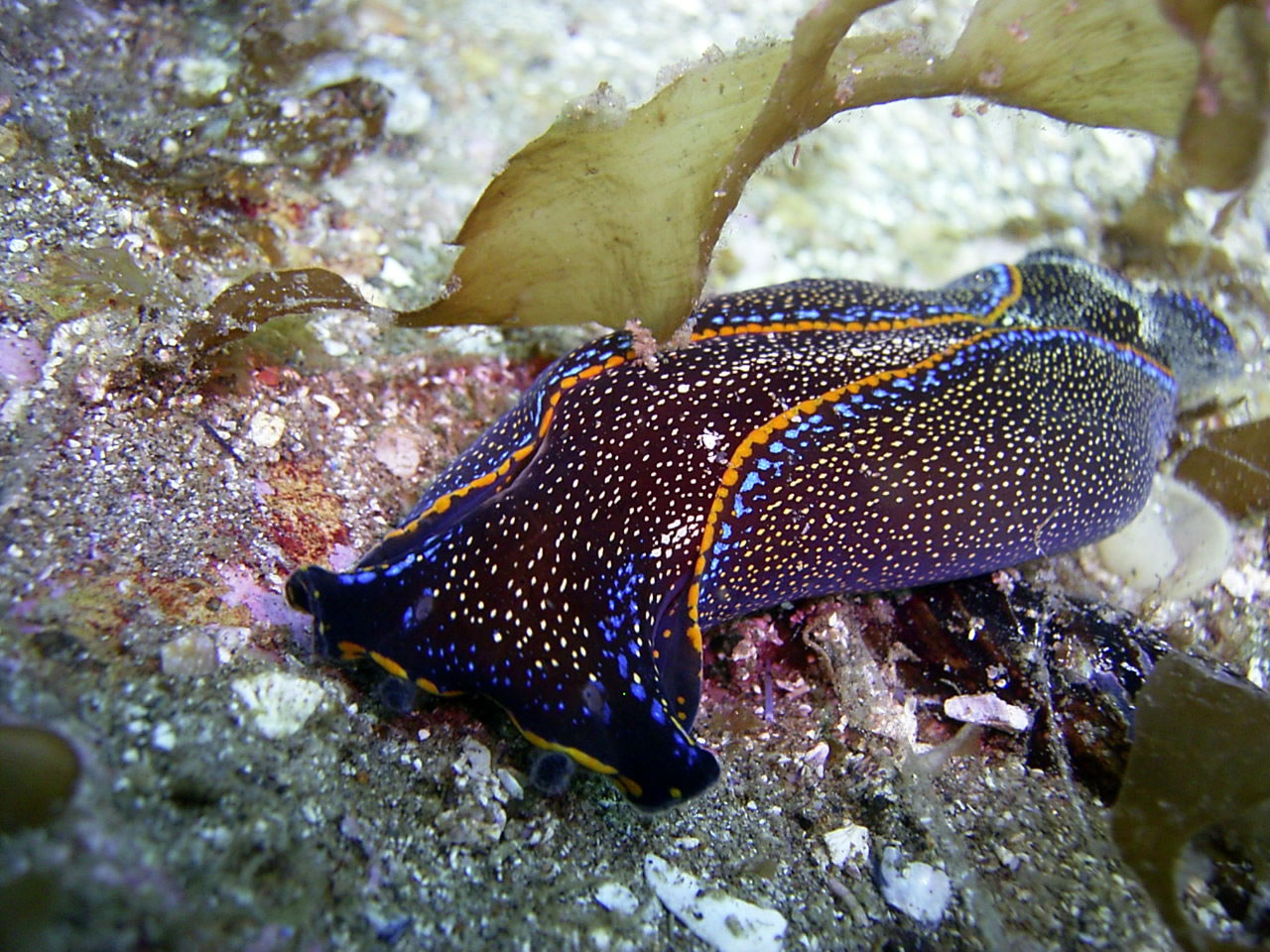
A threatening carnivorous predator to these sea slugs, Navanax inermis

=== Defense mechanisms ===
In response to predators, the genus Janolus exhibit an adaptive mechanism in which they roll into a ball, exposing its cerata. Brightly colored animals are generally toxic which is advantageous to deter potential threats. For this marine species, the exhibition of such vibrant colors is an interesting mechanism in terms of their survival. Additionally, the ability to secrete acids from their cerata act as a crucial advantage against predators and has become part of the species' defense system.

== Reproduction ==
Like many nudibranchs, Janolus flavoanulatus are hermaphrodites, displaying reproductive organs of both sexes. Because they are solitary in nature, this form of reproduction is convenient and they are capable to mate with any neighbor that passes by. The eggs that are dispersed by this species form into free-swimming larvae that sink to the ocean surface, eventually maturing as adults. The eggs are within the capsules and can hatch in about a week depending on ideal temperatures. The larvae drift with water currents and feed on plankton before morphing into adults, eventually leaving behind their shells upon metamorphosis.

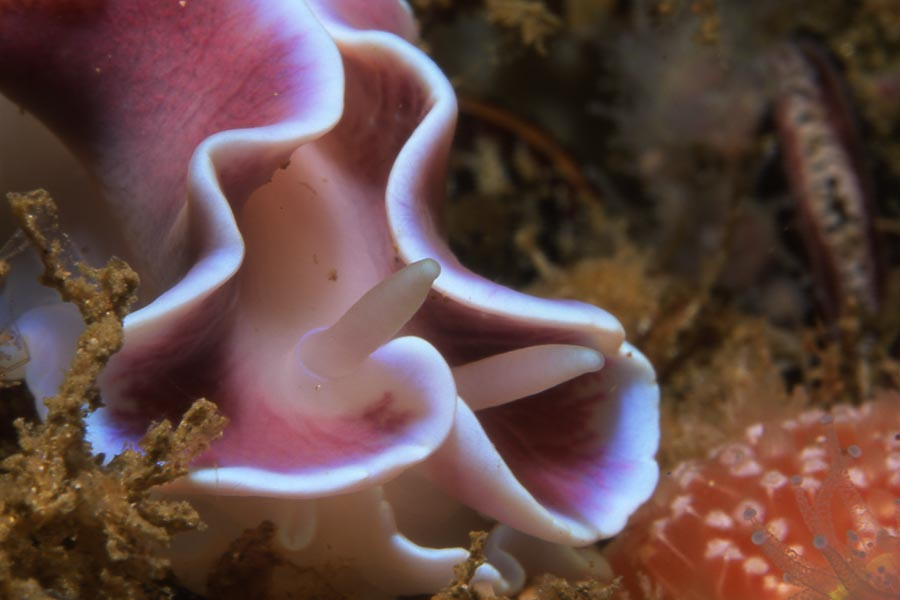
Chemosensory rhinophores found among nudibranchs and Janolus flavoanulatus
