= Licornia peltata =

Scientific classification
- Kingdom: Animalia
- Phylum: Bryozoa
- Class: Gymnolaemata
- Order: Cheilostomatida
- Family: Candidae
- Genus: Licornia
- Species: L. peltata

Binomial name
- Licornia peltata (Tilbrook & Vieira, 2012)

Synonyms
- Scrupocellaria peltata Tilbrook & Vieira, 2012

Species of moss animal

Licornia peltata is a species of gymnolaematan bryozoan (sea mat) first described from the Queensland coast. Originally placed in the genus Scrupocellaria, it has now been classified within the genus Licornia.
