= Licornia prolata =

Scientific classification
- Kingdom: Animalia
- Phylum: Bryozoa
- Class: Gymnolaemata
- Order: Cheilostomatida
- Family: Candidae
- Genus: Licornia
- Species: L. prolata

Binomial name
- Licornia prolata (Tilbrook & Vieira, 2012)

Synonyms
- Scrupocellaria prolata Tilbrook & Vieira, 2012

Species of moss animal

Licornia prolata is a species of gymnolaematan bryozoan (sea mat) first described from the Queensland coast. Originally placed in the genus Scrupocellaria, it is now classified in the genus Licornia.
