= Paralicornia limatula =

Scientific classification
- Kingdom: Animalia
- Phylum: Bryozoa
- Class: Gymnolaemata
- Order: Cheilostomatida
- Family: Candidae
- Genus: Paralicornia
- Species: P. limatula

Binomial name
- Paralicornia limatula (Hayward, 1988)

Synonyms
- Scrupocellaria limatula Hayward, 1988

Species of bryozoa from Mauritius

Paralicornia limatula is a species of bryozoan, found near the island of Mauritius.
