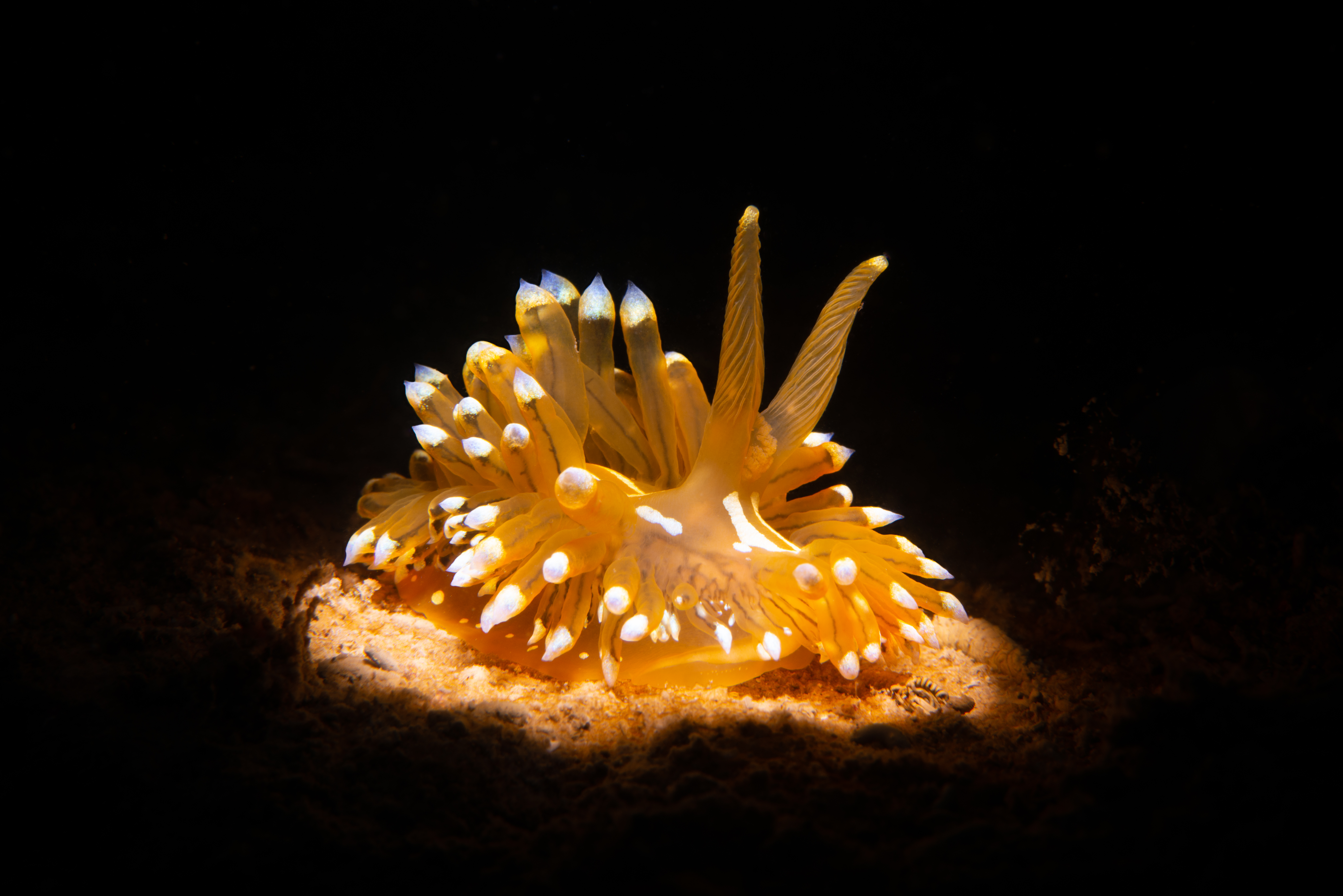
- Antiopella cristata from the Mediterranean

Scientific classification
- Kingdom: Animalia
- Phylum: Mollusca
- Class: Gastropoda
- Order: Nudibranchia
- Suborder: Cladobranchia
- Family: Janolidae
- Genus: Antiopella; Hoyle, 1902

Species
- See text

Synonyms
- Antiopa Alder & Hancock, 1848 (invalid: junior homonym of Antiopa Meigen, 1800 [Diptera]; Antiopella is a replacement name)

= Antiopella =

Genus of gastropods

Antiopella is a genus of small to large sea slugs, or more accurately nudibranchs, marine gastropod mollusks, in the family Janolidae.

== Description ==
Species of Antiopella were included in Janolus for a period of time.

== Ecology ==
=== Habitat ===
This genus of nudibranch is found in shallow and subtidal waters.

=== Feeding habits ===
Antiopella species feed on Bryozoa, moss animals.

== Species ==
Species in the genus Antiopella include:

- Antiopella barbarensis (J. G. Cooper, 1863)
- Antiopella capensis (Bergh, 1907)
- Antiopella cristata (Delle Chiaje, 1841)
- Antiopella fusca (O'Donoghue, 1924)
- Antiopella longidentata (Gosliner, 1981)
- Antiopella novozealandica Eliot, 1907
- Antiopella praeclara Bouchet, 1975

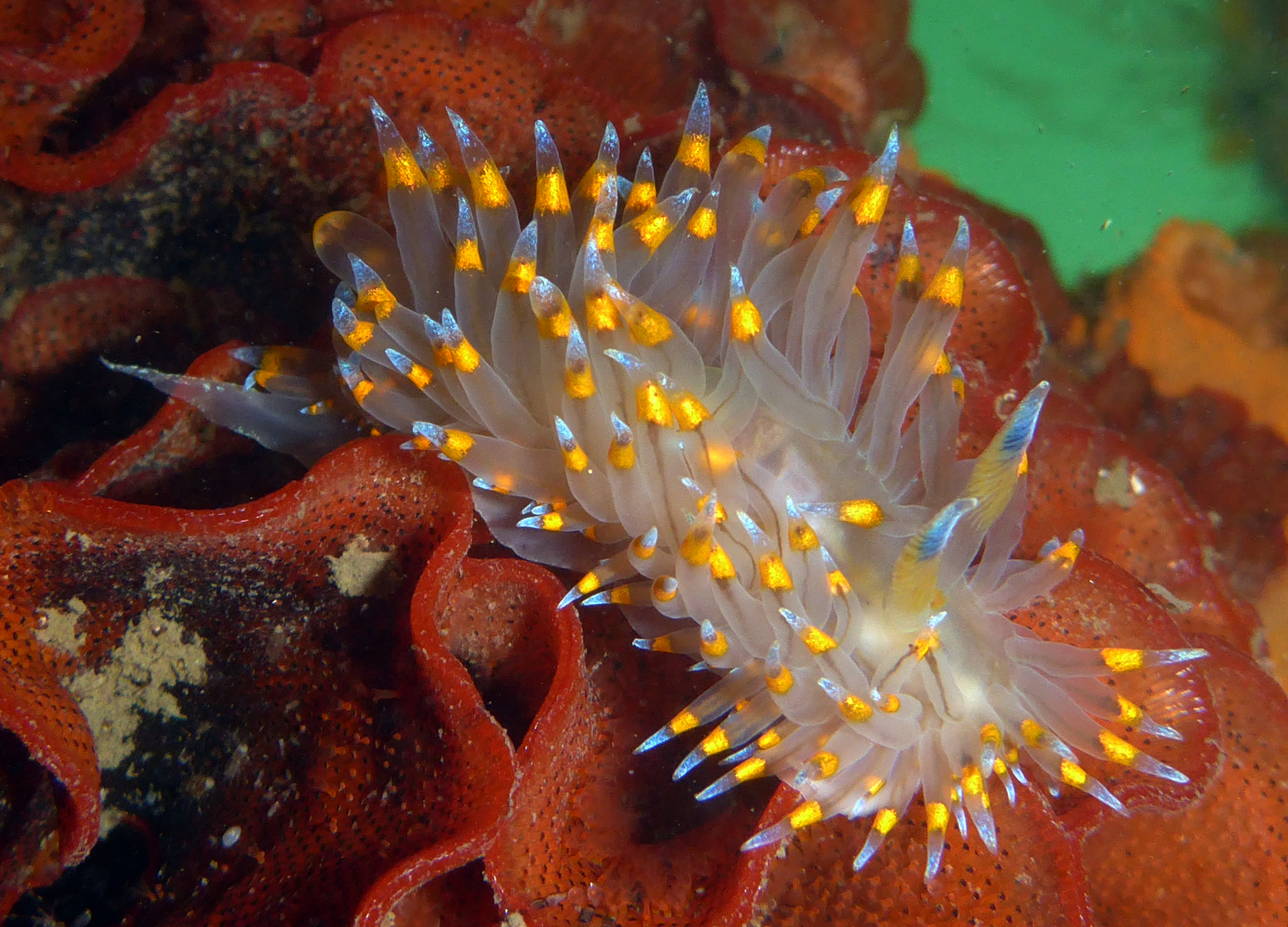
Antiopella barbarensis

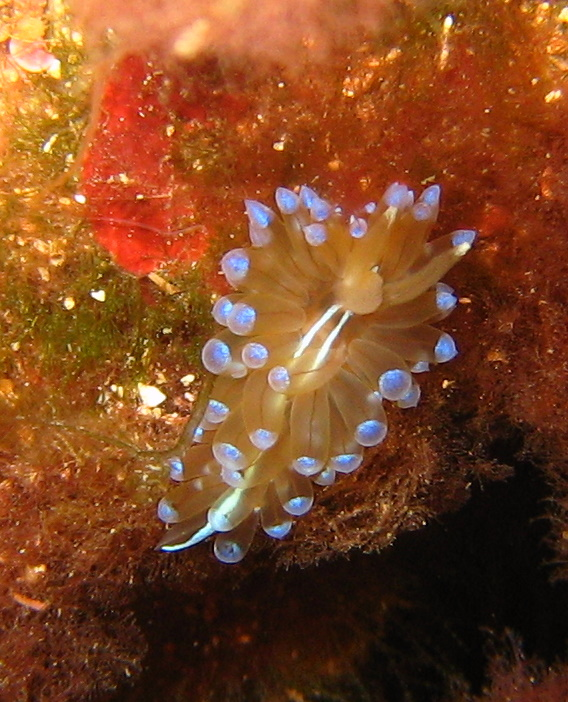
Antiopella cristata

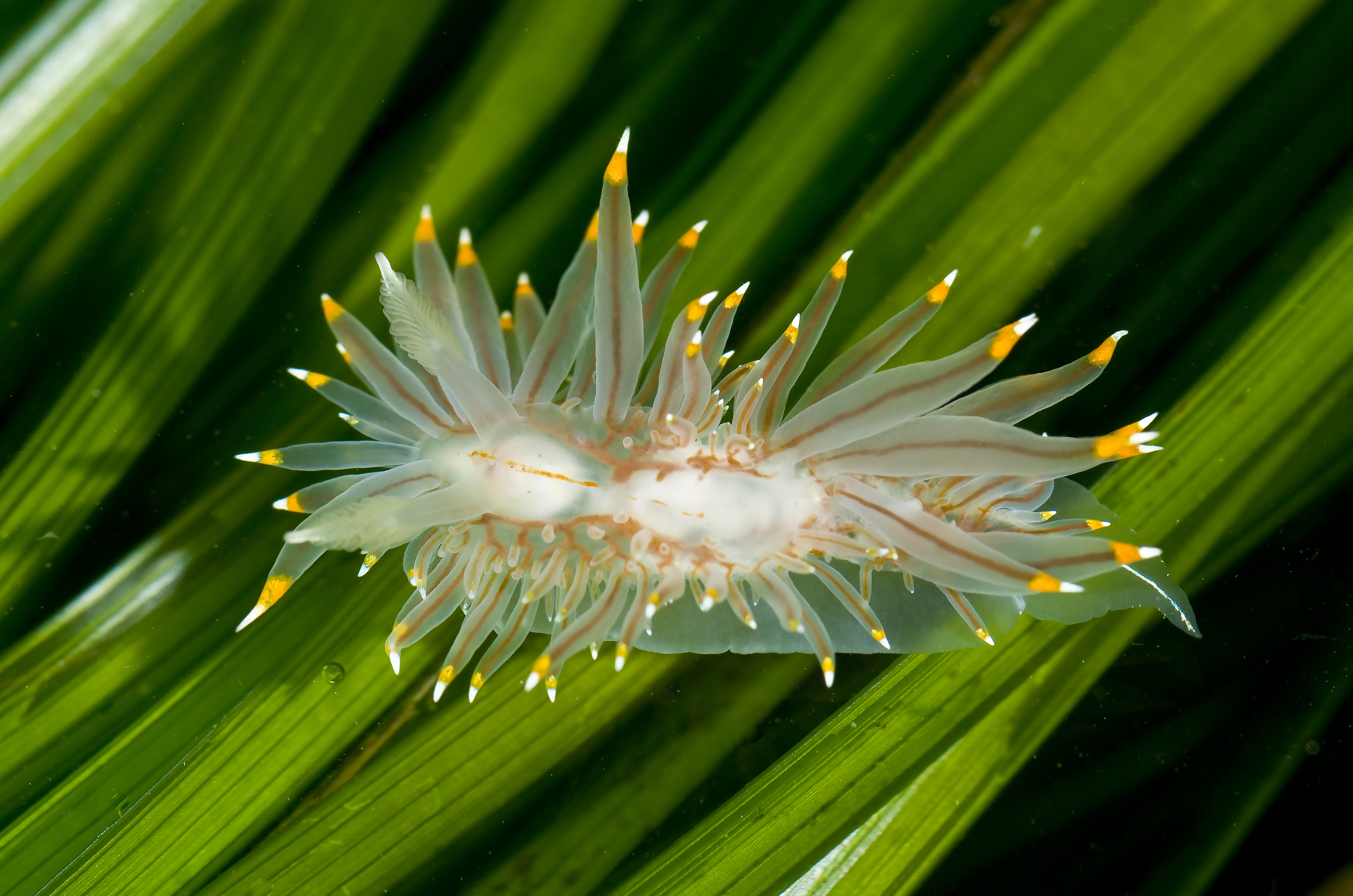
Antiopella fusca
