= Paralicornia hamata =

Scientific classification
- Kingdom: Animalia
- Phylum: Bryozoa
- Class: Gymnolaemata
- Order: Cheilostomatida
- Family: Candidae
- Genus: Paralicornia
- Species: P. hamata

Binomial name
- Paralicornia hamata (Tilbrook & Vieira, 2012)

Synonyms
- Scrupocellaria hamata Tilbrook & Vieira, 2012

Species of moss animal

Paralicornia hamata is a species of gymnolaematan bryozoan (sea mat) first described from the Queensland coast. Originally placed in the genus Scrupocellaria, it is now classified in the genus Paralicornia.
