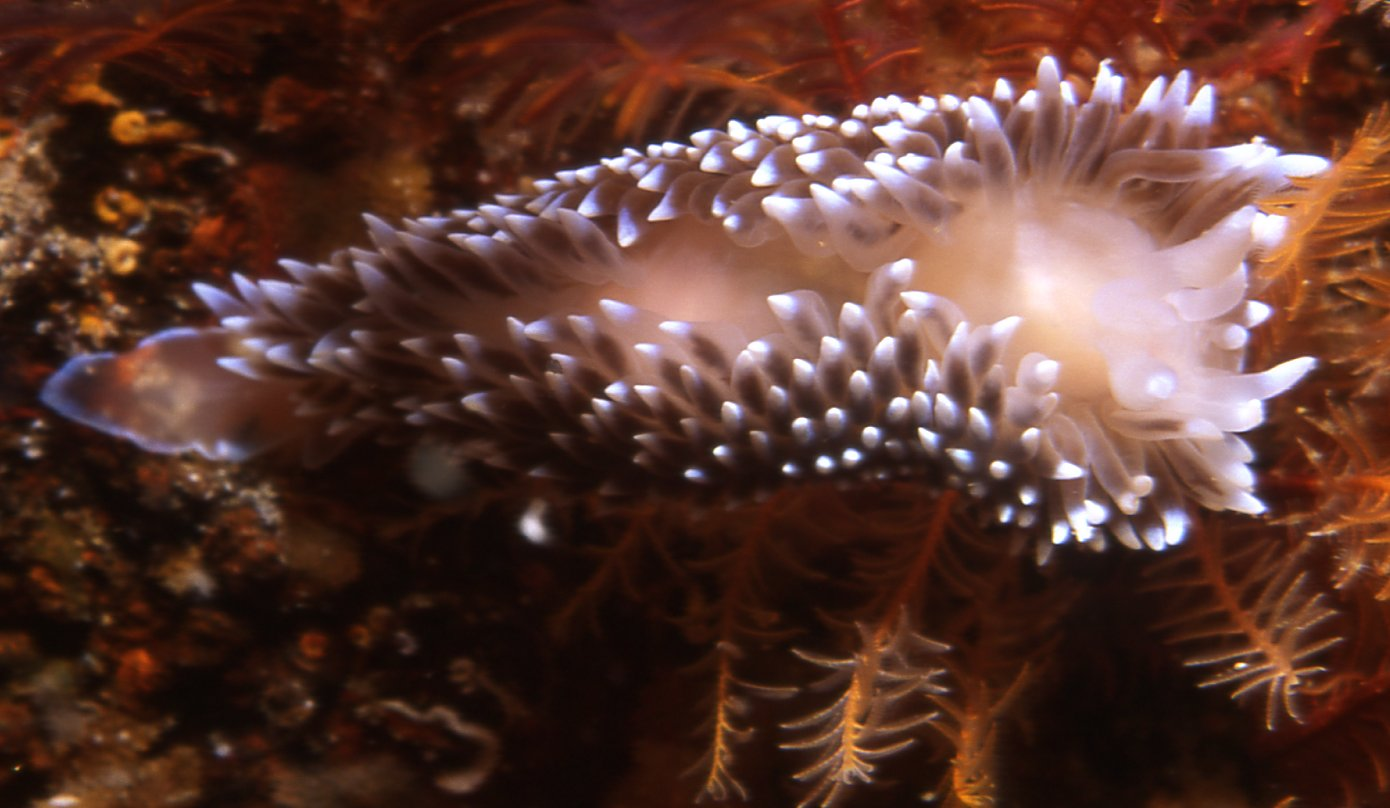
- A silvertip nudibranch, either A. capensis or A. longidenetata

Scientific classification
- Kingdom: Animalia
- Phylum: Mollusca
- Class: Gastropoda
- Order: Nudibranchia
- Suborder: Cladobranchia
- Family: Janolidae
- Genus: Antiopella
- Species: A. capensis

Binomial name
- Antiopella capensis (Bergh, 1907)

Synonyms
- Janolus capensis Bergh, 1907

= Antiopella capensis =

Species of gastropod

Antiopella capensis, originally described as Janolus capensis, the Cape silvertip nudibranch, is a beautiful species of nudibranch, or sea slug. It is a marine gastropod mollusc in the family Janolidae.

Apart from striking differences in the egg ribbons, individuals of this species are externally not distinguishable from Antiopella longidentata.

== Distribution ==
This species is endemic to the South African coast and is found only from Saldanha Bay to East London, from the intertidal border to at least 40 m.

== Description ==
The Cape silvertip nudibranch grows up to 40 mm in total length. It is a pale-bodied nudibranch with dark- to tan-coloured cerata with white tips. Its rhinophores are white and rolled. They are separated from one another by an opaque white spherical mass of unknown function known as the rhinophoral crest.

== Ecology ==
This species of nudibranch feeds on moss animals, bryozoans such as Menipea triseriata and Onchoporella buskii. The egg mass is globular, convoluted and has numerous eggs per capsule. The egg ribbon of the medallion silvertip is diagnostic for the species: a flat spiral of capsules with only 5-7 eggs per capsule.
