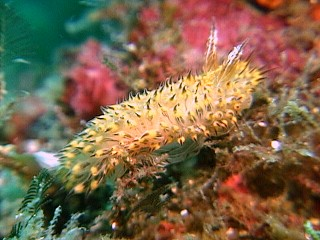

Scientific classification
- Kingdom: Animalia
- Phylum: Mollusca
- Class: Gastropoda
- Order: Nudibranchia
- Suborder: Cladobranchia
- Family: Janolidae
- Genus: Janolus
- Species: J. toyamensis

Binomial name
- Janolus toyamensis Baba & Abe, 1970

= Janolus toyamensis =

Species of gastropod

Janolus toyamensis, common name purple-tipped janolus, is a colorful sea slug, an arminina (a suborder of Janolus) nudibranch, a marine gastropod mollusc in the family Janolidae.
