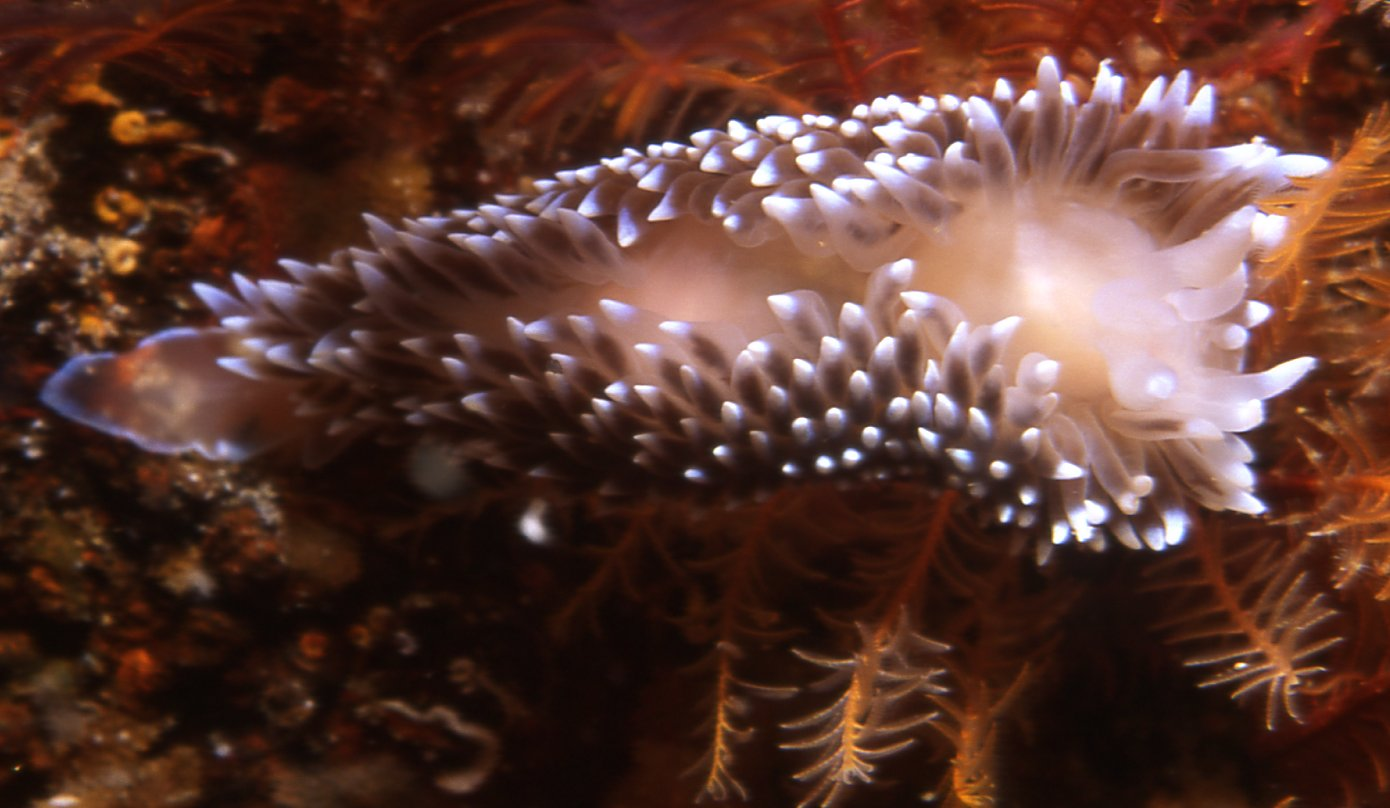
- A silvertip nudibranch, either A. longidentata or A. capensis

Scientific classification
- Kingdom: Animalia
- Phylum: Mollusca
- Class: Gastropoda
- Order: Nudibranchia
- Suborder: Cladobranchia
- Family: Janolidae
- Genus: Antiopella
- Species: A. longidentata

Binomial name
- Antiopella longidentata (Gosliner, 1981)

Synonyms
- Janolus longidentatus Gosliner, 1981

= Antiopella longidentata =

Species of gastropod

Antiopella longidentata (Gosliner, 1981), previously named Janolus longidentatus, the medallion silvertip nudibranch, is a species of nudibranch, or sea slug. It is a marine gastropod mollusc in the family Janolidae.

Apart from striking differences in the egg ribbons, individuals of this species are externally not distinguishable from Antiopella capensis.

== Distribution ==
This species is endemic to the South African coast and is found on both sides of the Cape Peninsula, from the intertidal border to at least 30 m.

== Description ==
The medallion silvertip nudibranch grows up to 40mm in total length. It is a pale-bodied nudibranch with dark- to tan-coloured cerata with white tips. Its rhinophores are white and rolled. They are separated from one another by an opaque white spherical mass of unknown function called the rhinophoral crest.

== Ecology ==
This species of nudibranch feeds on a bryozoan, the spiral moss animal, Menipea triseriata. The egg mass is a flat spiral of capsules with 5-7 eggs per capsule. The egg ribbon of the Cape silvertip nudibranch is globular, convoluted and has numerous eggs per capsule.
