= Paralicornia sinuosa =

Scientific classification
- Kingdom: Animalia
- Phylum: Bryozoa
- Class: Gymnolaemata
- Order: Cheilostomatida
- Family: Candidae
- Genus: Paralicornia
- Species: P. sinuosa

Binomial name
- Paralicornia sinuosa (Canu & Bassler, 1927)

Synonyms
- Scrupocellaria sinuosa Canu & Bassler, 1927

Species of aquatic invertebrate

Paralicornia sinuosa is a species of colonial bryozoan in the family Candidae, found in the Indo-Pacific region. It was originally classified in the genus Scrupocellaria.
