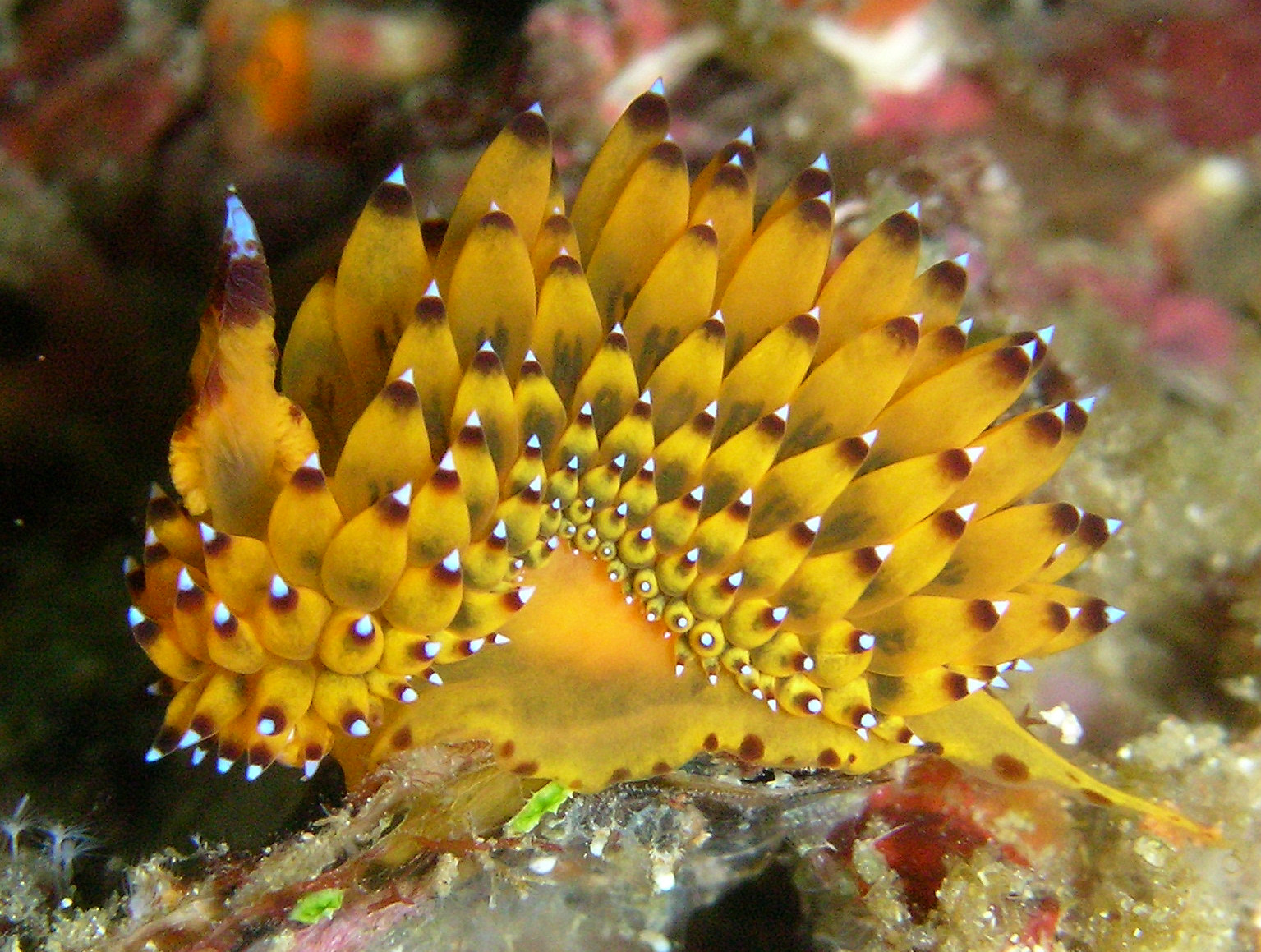

Scientific classification
- Kingdom: Animalia
- Phylum: Mollusca
- Class: Gastropoda
- Order: Nudibranchia
- Suborder: Cladobranchia
- Family: Janolidae
- Genus: Janolus
- Species: J. savinkini

Binomial name
- Janolus savinkini Martynov & Korshunova, 2012

= Janolus savinkini =

Species of gastropod

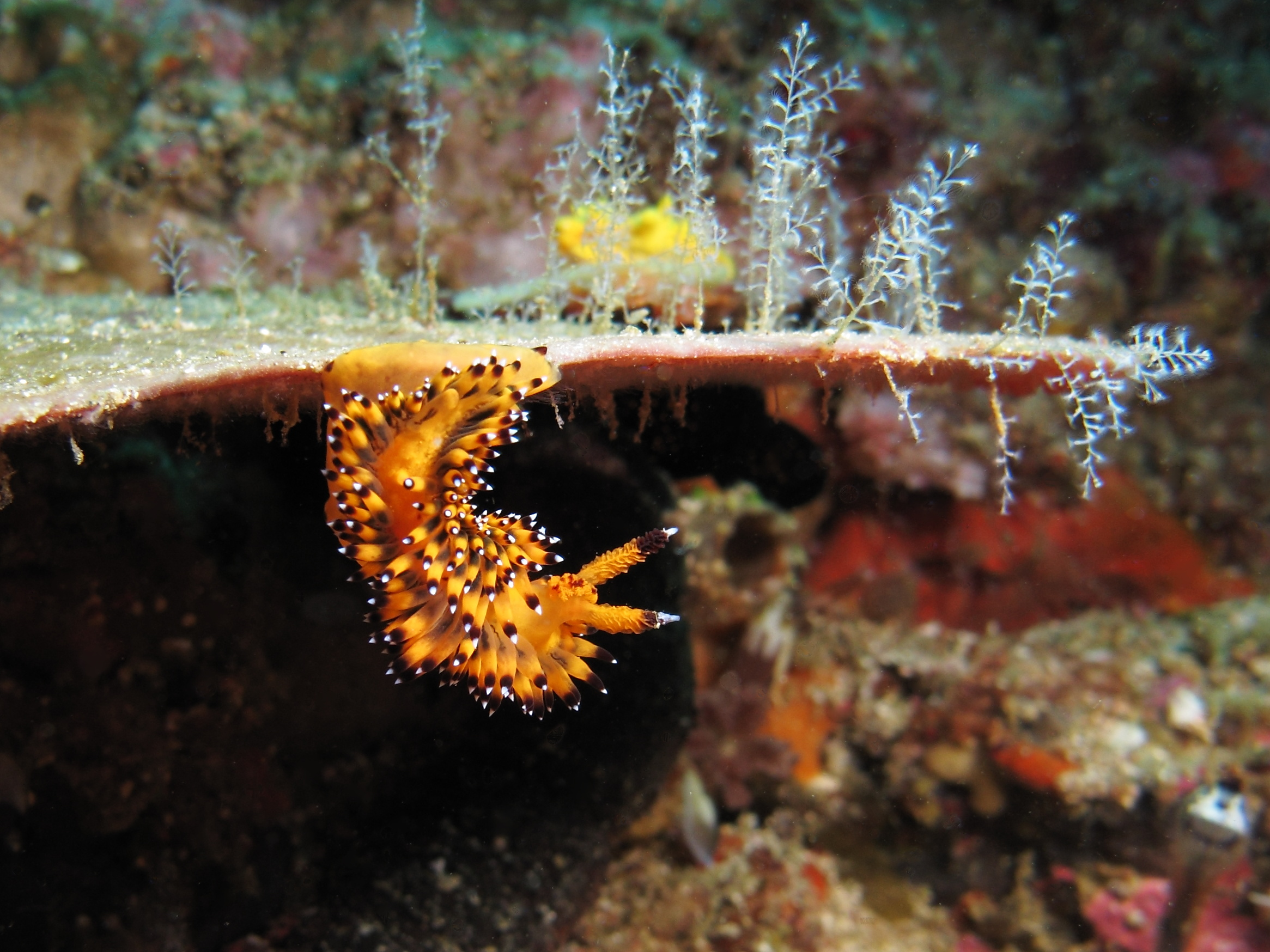

Janolus savinkini, common name purple-tipped janolus, is a colorful sea slug, an arminina (a suborder of Janolus) nudibranch, a marine gastropod mollusc in the family Janolidae. The body and caruncle of this species are yellow with a hue of light orange. The papillae and cerata are also this colour except for the tips, which are blue/purple, hence the common name. It is found in East Asian waters and is believed to be extremely rare in Okinawa.
