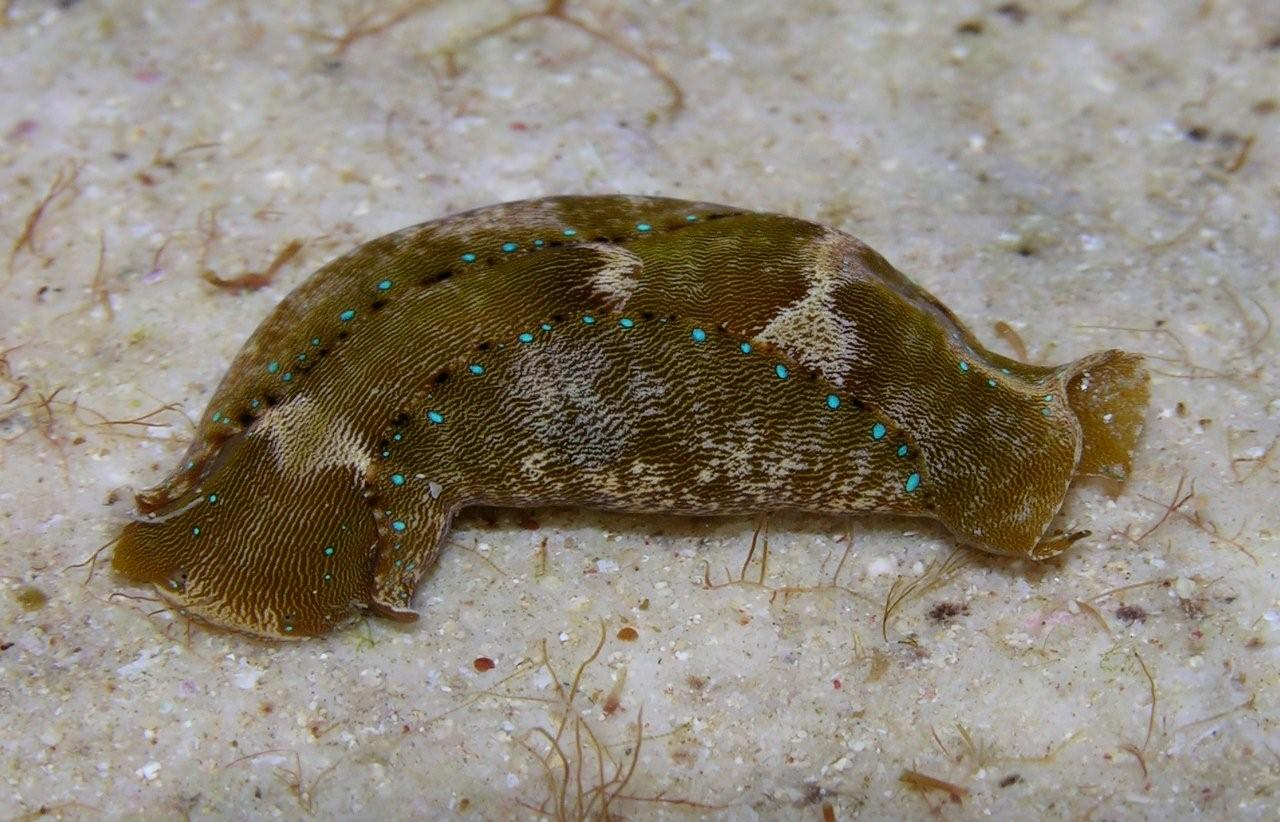

Scientific classification
- Kingdom: Animalia
- Phylum: Mollusca
- Class: Gastropoda
- Order: Cephalaspidea
- Family: Aglajidae
- Genus: Navanax
- Species: N. aenigmaticus

Binomial name
- Navanax aenigmaticus (Bergh, 1893)

Synonyms
- Navarchus aenigmaticus Bergh, 1893 (original combination)

= Navanax aenigmaticus =

Species of slug

Navanax aenigmaticus common name the mysterious aglaja is a species of Navanax found in the Pacific Coast of Central America.
