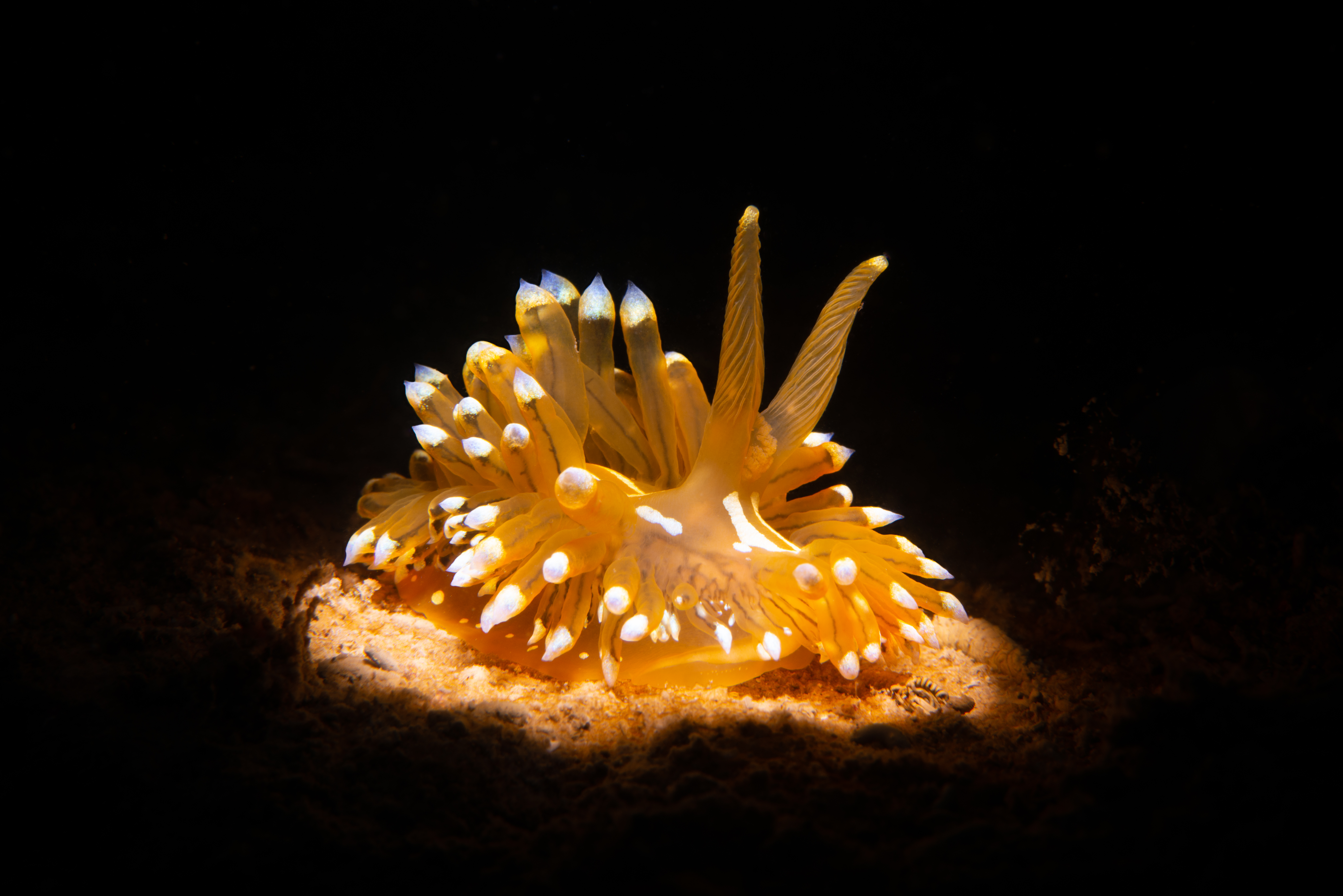
- Antiopella cristata

Scientific classification
- Kingdom: Animalia
- Phylum: Mollusca
- Class: Gastropoda
- Order: Nudibranchia
- Suborder: Janolacea
- Family: Janolidae
- Genus: Antiopella
- Species: A. cristata

Binomial name
- Antiopella cristata (Delle Chiaje, 1841)

Synonyms
- Antiopa splendida Alder & Hancock, 1848; Eolidia cristata (Delle Chiaje, 1841); Eolis cristata Delle Chiaje, 1841; Janolus cristatus (Delle Chiaje, 1841); Janus spinolae Vérany, 1846

= Antiopella cristata =

Species of gastropod

Antiopella cristata, sometimes known by the common name crested aeolis, is a species of nudibranch, a marine gastropod mollusc in the family Janolidae.

== Taxonomy ==
Previously some authors synonymised Antiopella with Janolus and assigned the genus Janolus to the Janolidae family (see ITIS.gov or AnimalDiversity), others (see Seaslug Forum) to the family of Zephyrinidae, and these were synonymised names of Proctonotidae (see WoRMS). In 2019 an integrated taxonomic study reinstated Antiopella and Janolus as separate genera and placed them in the family Janolidae.

== Description ==
This species is semi-transparent and has an oval-shaped outline. It is cream or light brown in colour, and grows to approximately 7.5 cm in length. The head has oral tentacles that are short.

The lateral cerata are numerous, have a smooth surface and an inflated appearance. The central digestive gland lobe is thin and brown in colour and can be seen through each ceras. These gland lobes divide at the tip of the cerata into numerous terminal branches, distinguishing Janolids from Aeolid nudibranchs. The tips of the cerata are bluish-white and iridescent.

The white surface colouration that is present on the cerata also appears in patches or lines along the bare central dorsum, as well as around the lamellate rhinophores and on the metapodium. The rhinophores are joined together at their bases with a swollen and wrinkled accessory caruncle. Both the rhinophores and median sensory caruncle are somewhat darker in colour than the rest of the body.

== Distribution ==
Antiopella cristata has been found as far north as Norway down through the British Isles and the French Atlantic coast. It has also been recorded in Moroccan waters as well as in the western Mediterranean Sea.

== Habitat ==
It is found at depths of up to 40 metres, only in calm, clean water, on hard substrata in the sublittoral zone.

== Biology ==
Antiopella cristata eats erect bryozoans of the species Alcyonidium gelatinosum, Bicellariella ciliata and in the genus Bugula and Bugulina, such as Bugulina turbinata, Bugula plumosa, Bugula neritina and possibly species in the genus Cellaria.

The spawn of this species appear as a light pink or white string forming a wavy, circular pattern. The eggs themselves are contained within packets with transparent patches in between. This gives them the appearance of beads.

== Gallery ==
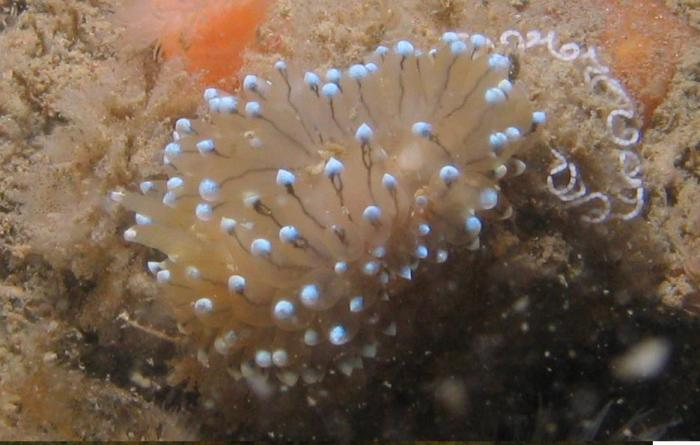
Antiopella cristata depositing eggs

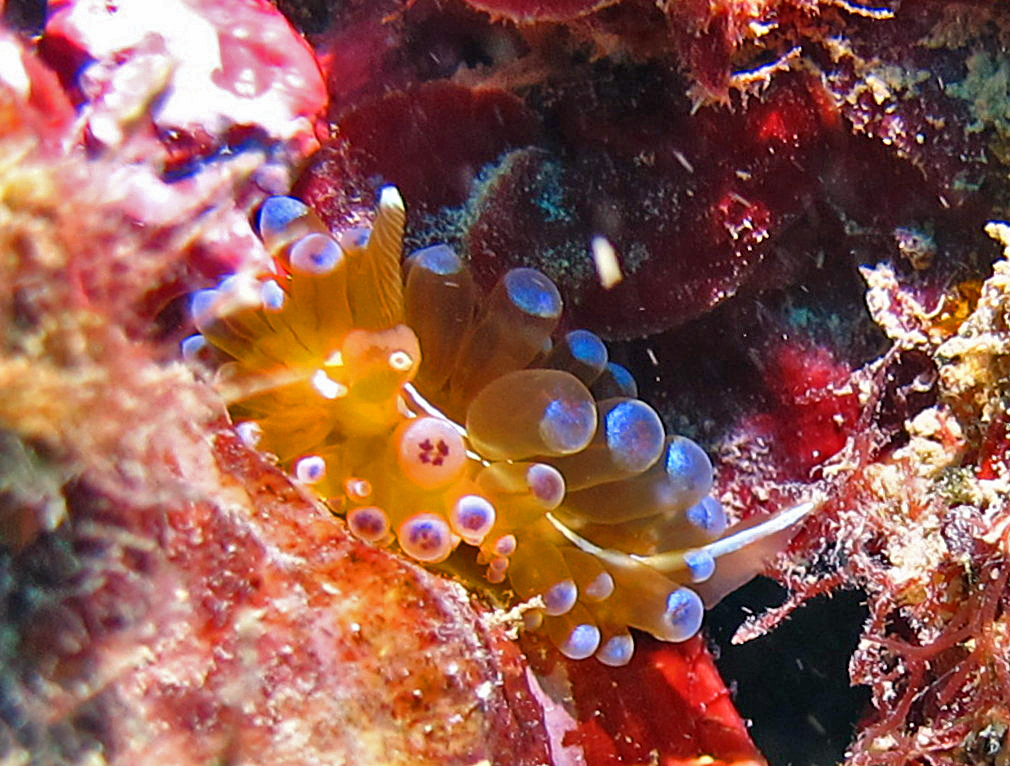
A. cristata in the Ligurian Sea (Levanto)

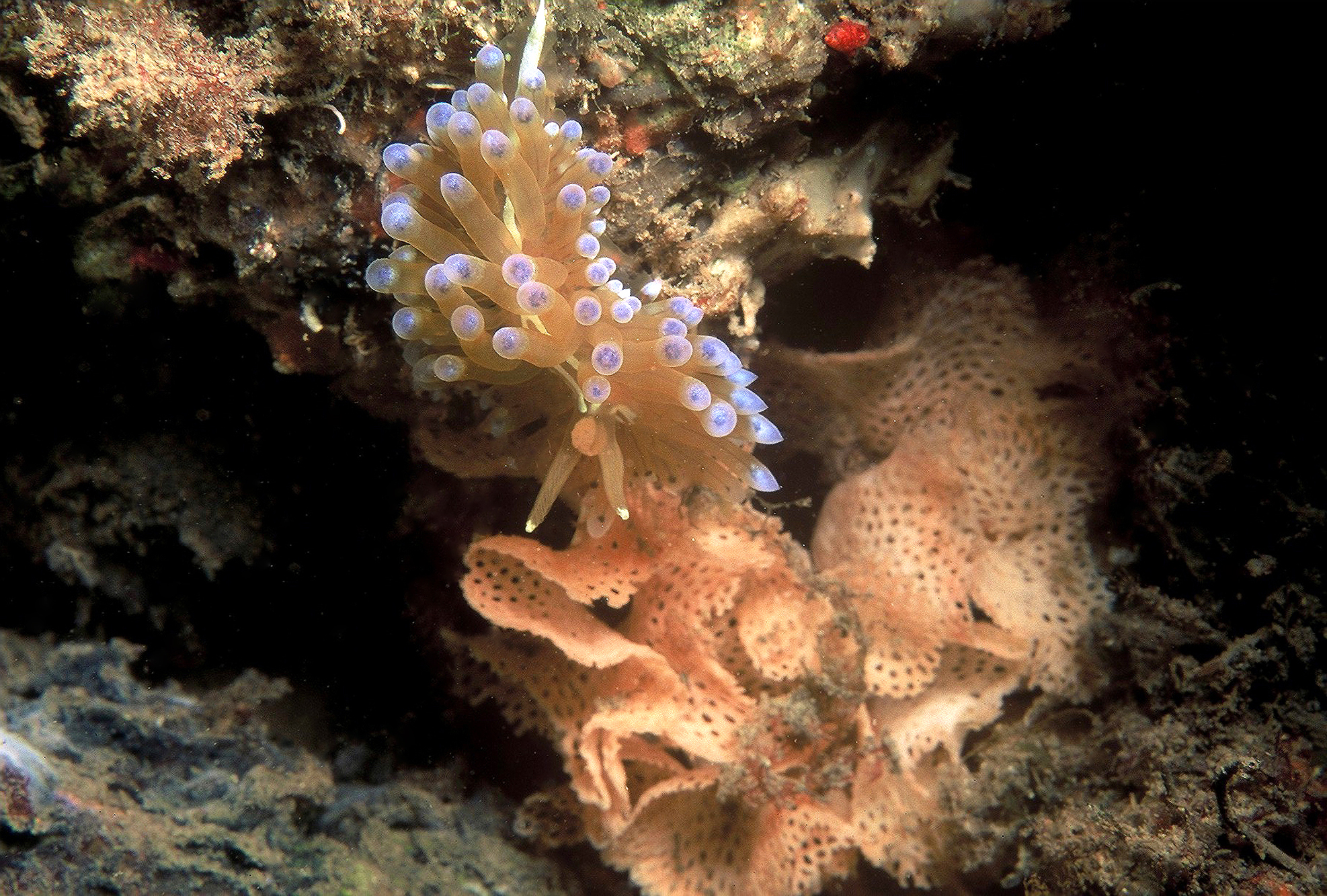
A. cristata on Reteporella grimaldii

Two A. cristata crawl across the bottom. Video clip
