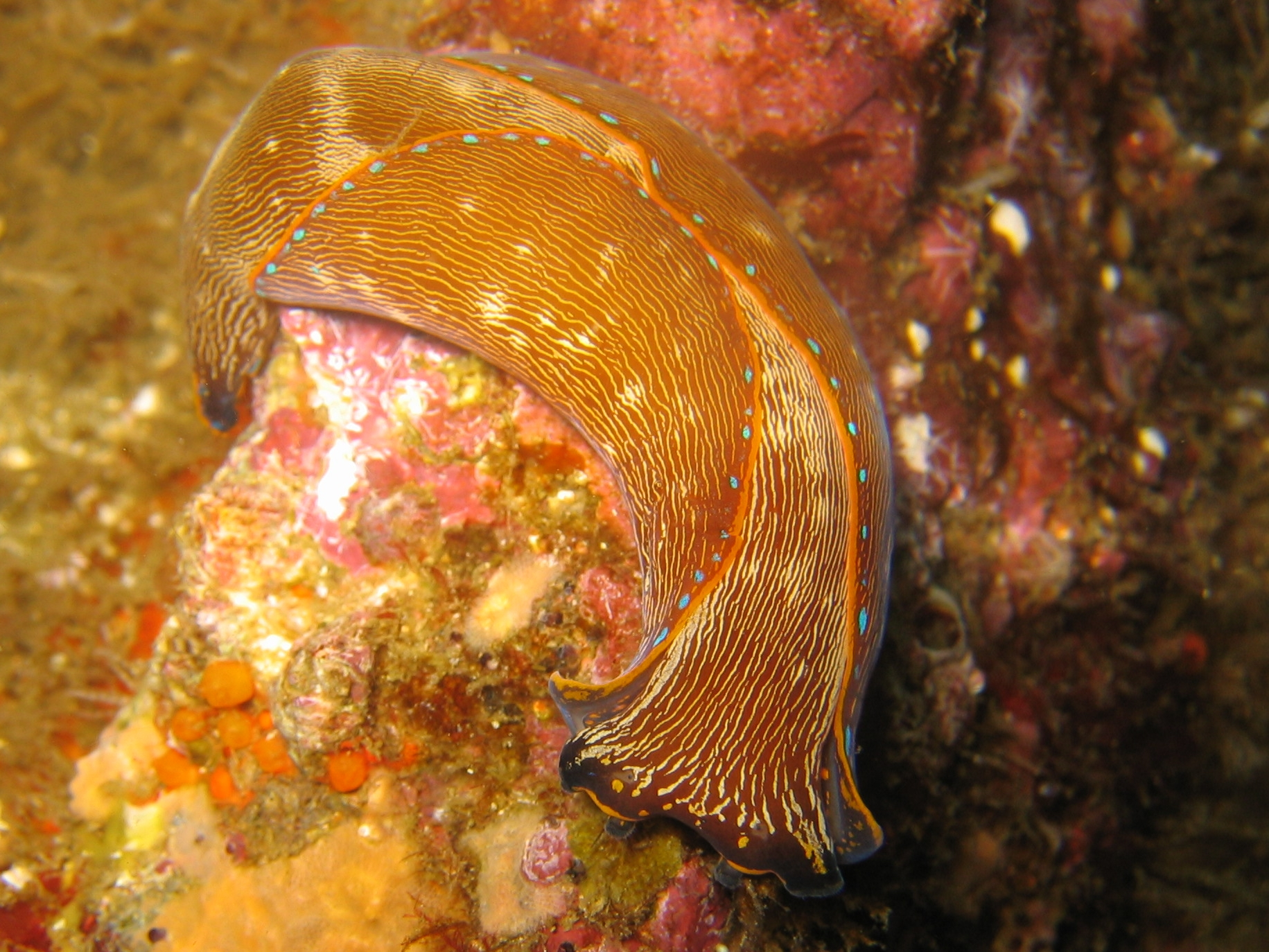
- Navanax inermis from Catalina Island, California

Scientific classification
- Kingdom: Animalia
- Phylum: Mollusca
- Class: Gastropoda
- Order: Cephalaspidea
- Family: Aglajidae
- Genus: Navanax; Pilsbry, 1895

Type species
- Strategus inermis J.G. Cooper, 1863

Species
- See text

Synonyms
- Navarchus J.G. Cooper, 1863 (Invalid: junior homonym of Navarchus Filippi & Verany, 1859 [Pisces]; Navanax is a replacement name); Posterobranchaea d'Orbigny, 1835; Strategus J.G. Cooper, 1863 (Invalid: junior homonym of Strategus Kirby & Spence, 1828 [Coleoptera]; Navarchus J.G. Cooper, 1863 and Navanax Pilsbry, 1895 are replacement names )

= Navanax =

Genus of gastropods

Navanax is a genus of sea slugs, marine opisthobranch gastropod molluscs in the family Aglajidae.

== Species ==
Species in the genus Navanax include:

- Navanax aenigmaticus (Bergh, 1893) - mysterious aglaja
- Navanax gemmatus (Mörch, 1863)
- Navanax inermis (J. G. Cooper, 1863) - California aglaja
- Navanax orbignyanus (Rochebrune, 1881)
- Navanax polyalphos (Gosliner & Williams, 1972) (taxon inquirendum)
