= Paralicornia =

Scientific classification
- Kingdom: Animalia
- Phylum: Bryozoa
- Class: Gymnolaemata
- Order: Cheilostomatida
- Family: Candidae
- Genus: Paralicornia; Vieira, Spencer Jones, Winston, Migotto & Marques, 2014

Type species
- Paralicornia sinuosa (Canu & Bassler, 1927)

Species
- See text

Genus of moss animals

Paralicornia is a genus of gymnolaematan bryozoans (sea mats).

== Species ==
The following species are recognised in the genus Paralicornia:

- Paralicornia electilis Winston & Jackson, 2021
- Paralicornia hamata (Tilbrook & Vieira, 2012)
- †Paralicornia interdigitata Di Martino, Taylor & Portell, 2017
- Paralicornia limatula (Hayward, 1988)
- Paralicornia obtecta (Haswell, 1880)
- Paralicornia pusilla (Smitt, 1872)
- Paralicornia sinuosa (Canu & Bassler, 1927)
- Paralicornia spatulatoidea (Liu, 1980)
- Paralicornia unguiculata (Osburn, 1950)
