= Licornia =

Scientific classification
- Kingdom: Animalia
- Phylum: Bryozoa
- Class: Gymnolaemata
- Order: Cheilostomatida
- Family: Candidae
- Genus: Licornia van Beneden, 1850

Type species
- Licornia jolloisii (Audouin, 1826)

Species
- See text

Synonyms
- Retiscrupocellaria d'Hondt, 1988

Genus of moss animals

Licornia is a genus of gymnolaematan bryozoans (sea mats).

== Species ==
The following species are recognised in the genus Licornia:

- Licornia annectens (MacGillivray, 1887)
- Licornia bifurcata (Liu, 2001)
- Licornia cervicornis (Busk, 1852)
- †Licornia cookei (Canu & Bassler, 1920)
- Licornia curvata (Harmer, 1926)
- Licornia cyclostoma (Busk, 1852)
- Licornia diadema (Busk, 1852)
- Licornia diegensis (Robertson, 1905)
- Licornia drachi (Marcus, 1955)
- Licornia ferox (Busk, 1852)
- Licornia gaspari (Thornely, 1907)
- Licornia jolloisii (Audouin, 1826)
- Licornia longispinosa (Harmer, 1926)
- Licornia macropora (Osburn, 1950)
- Licornia mexicana (Osburn, 1950)
- Licornia micheli (Marcus, 1955)
- †Licornia milneri (Canu & Bassler, 1920)
- Licornia peltata (Tilbrook & Vieira, 2012)
- Licornia prolata (Tilbrook & Vieira, 2012)
- Licornia pugnax (Osburn, 1950)
- †Licornia raigadensis (Badve & Sonar, 1997)
- Licornia regularis (Osburn, 1940)
- †Licornia resseri (Canu & Bassler, 1920)
- Licornia securifera (Busk, 1884)
- Licornia spinigera (Osburn, 1950)
- Licornia tridentata (Waters, 1918)
- Licornia vieirai Sokolover, Taylor & Ilan, 2016
- Licornia wasinensis (Waters, 1913)
