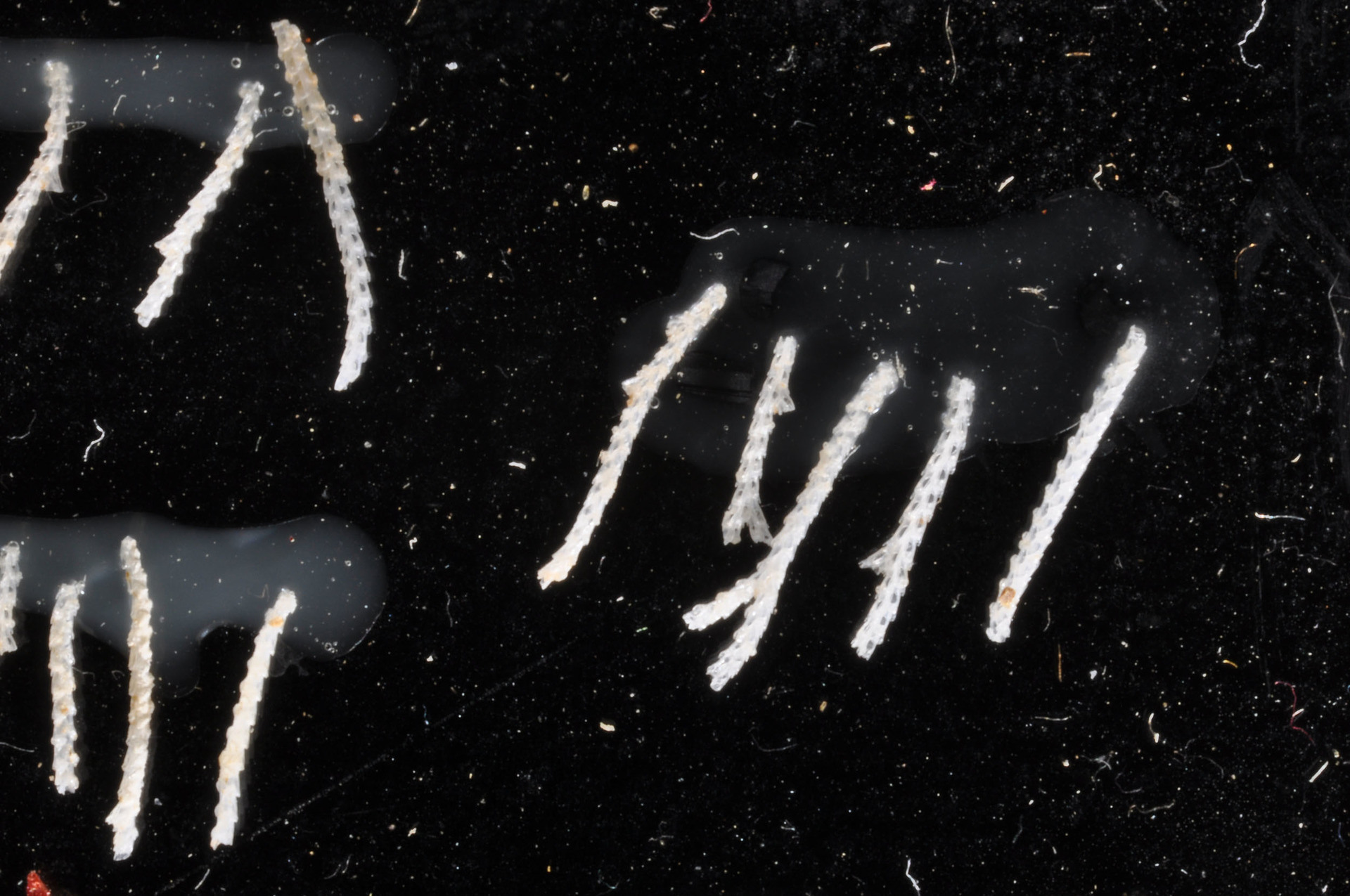

Scientific classification
- Kingdom: Animalia
- Phylum: Bryozoa
- Class: Gymnolaemata
- Order: Cheilostomatida
- Family: Candidae
- Genus: Canda; Lamouroux, 1816

= Canda (bryozoan) =

Genus of bryozoans

Canda is a genus of bryozoans belonging to the family Candidae.

The genus has an almost cosmopolitan distribution.

== Species ==
The following species are recognised in the genus Canda:

- Canda alsia Winston, Vieira & Woollacott, 2014
- Canda arachnoides sensu Busk, 1852
- Canda caraibica Levinsen, 1909
- Canda clypeata (Haswell, 1881)
- †Canda federicae Di Martino & Taylor, 2014
- Canda filifera (Lamarck, 1816)
- Canda foliifera Harmer, 1926
- Canda fossilis Waters, 1881
- †Canda giorgioi Di Martino & Taylor, 2014
- †Canda inermis MacGillivray, 1895
- Canda inermis Winston & Jackson, 2021
- Canda ligata (Jullien, 1882)
- †Canda lunata Di Martino, Rosso & Taylor, 2025
- Canda munita Winston & Jackson, 2021
- Canda pecten Thornely, 1907
- Canda philippinensis Canu & Bassler, 1929
- †Canda rathbuni (Canu & Bassler, 1920)
- †Canda rectangulata Udin, 1964
- Canda retiformis Pourtalès, 1867
- Canda scutata Harmer, 1926
- Canda simplex Busk, 1884
- Canda tenuis MacGillivray, 1885
- †Canda triangulata (Canu & Bassler, 1920)
- †Canda ukirensis Sonar, Pawar & Wayal, 2022
- †Canda williardi (Canu & Bassler, 1920)
