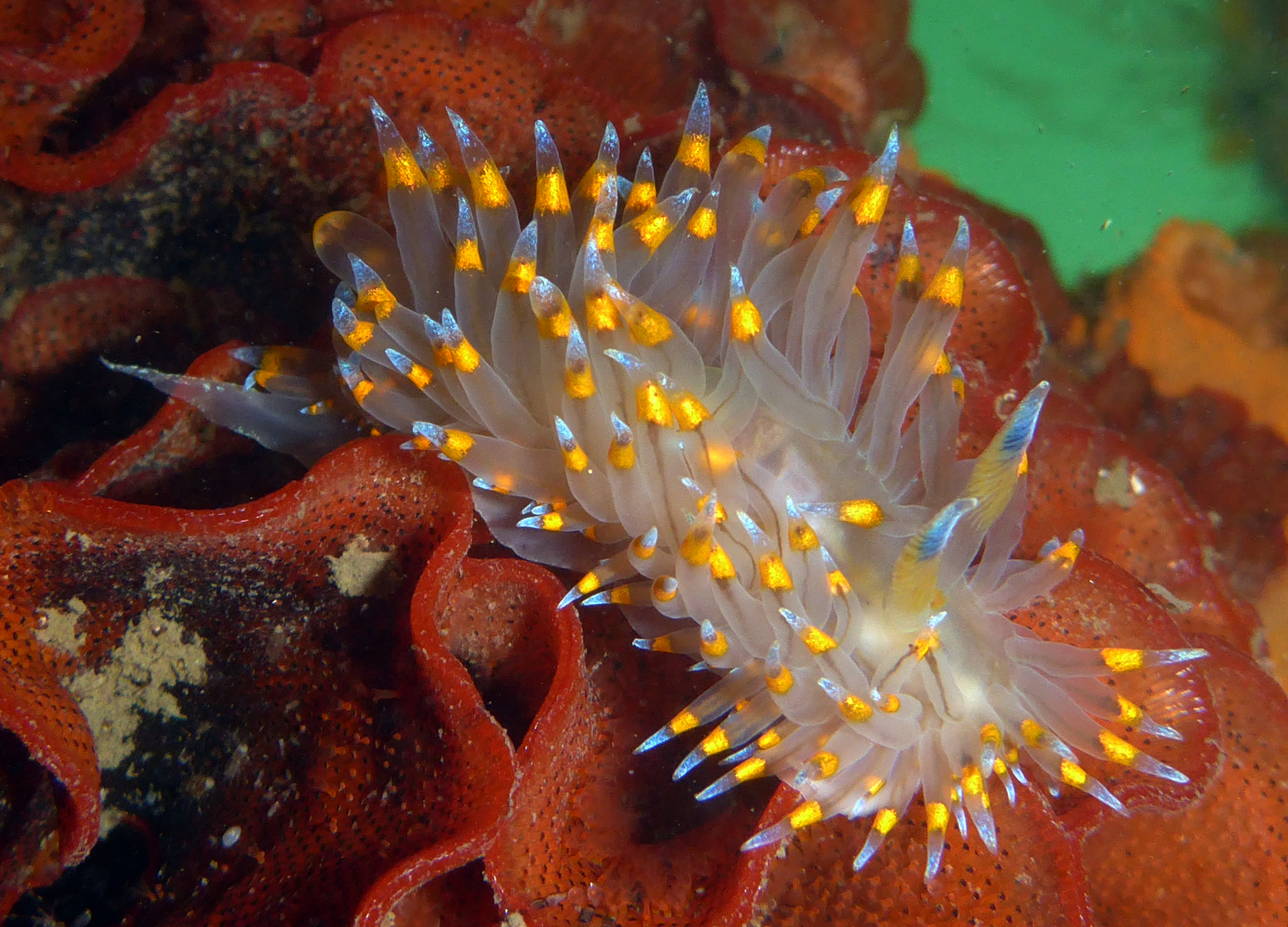
- Antiopella barbarensis from Santa Cruz, California

Scientific classification
- Kingdom: Animalia
- Phylum: Mollusca
- Class: Gastropoda
- Order: Nudibranchia
- Suborder: Cladobranchia
- Family: Janolidae
- Genus: Antiopella
- Species: A. barbarensis

Binomial name
- Antiopella barbarensis (J. G. Cooper, 1863)

Synonyms
- Janolus barbarensis (J. G. Cooper, 1863)

= Antiopella barbarensis =

Species of gastropod

Antiopella barbarensis, common name Santa Barbara janolus, is a colourful sea slug, a cladobranch nudibranch, a marine gastropod mollusc in the family Janolidae.

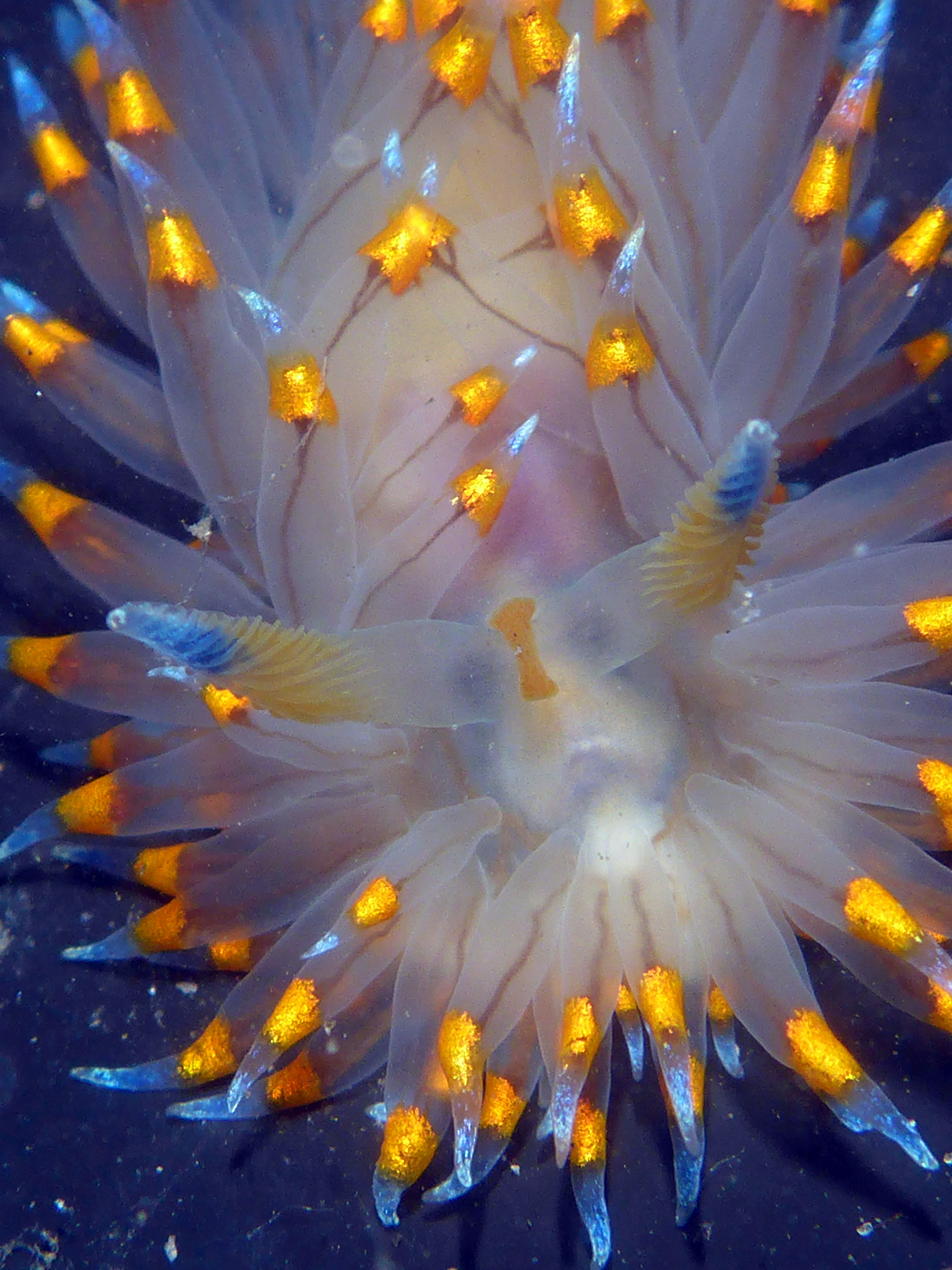
Antiopella barbarensis from Santa Cruz, California - head closeup

== Distribution ==
Antiopella barbarensis is a commonly found nudibranch on the Pacific coast inhabiting tide pools of La Jolla, California. Populations also expand to some parts of Costa Rica.

Behrens 1991 gives the distribution as "San Francisco Bay to Baja California, Gulf of California, Mexico".
