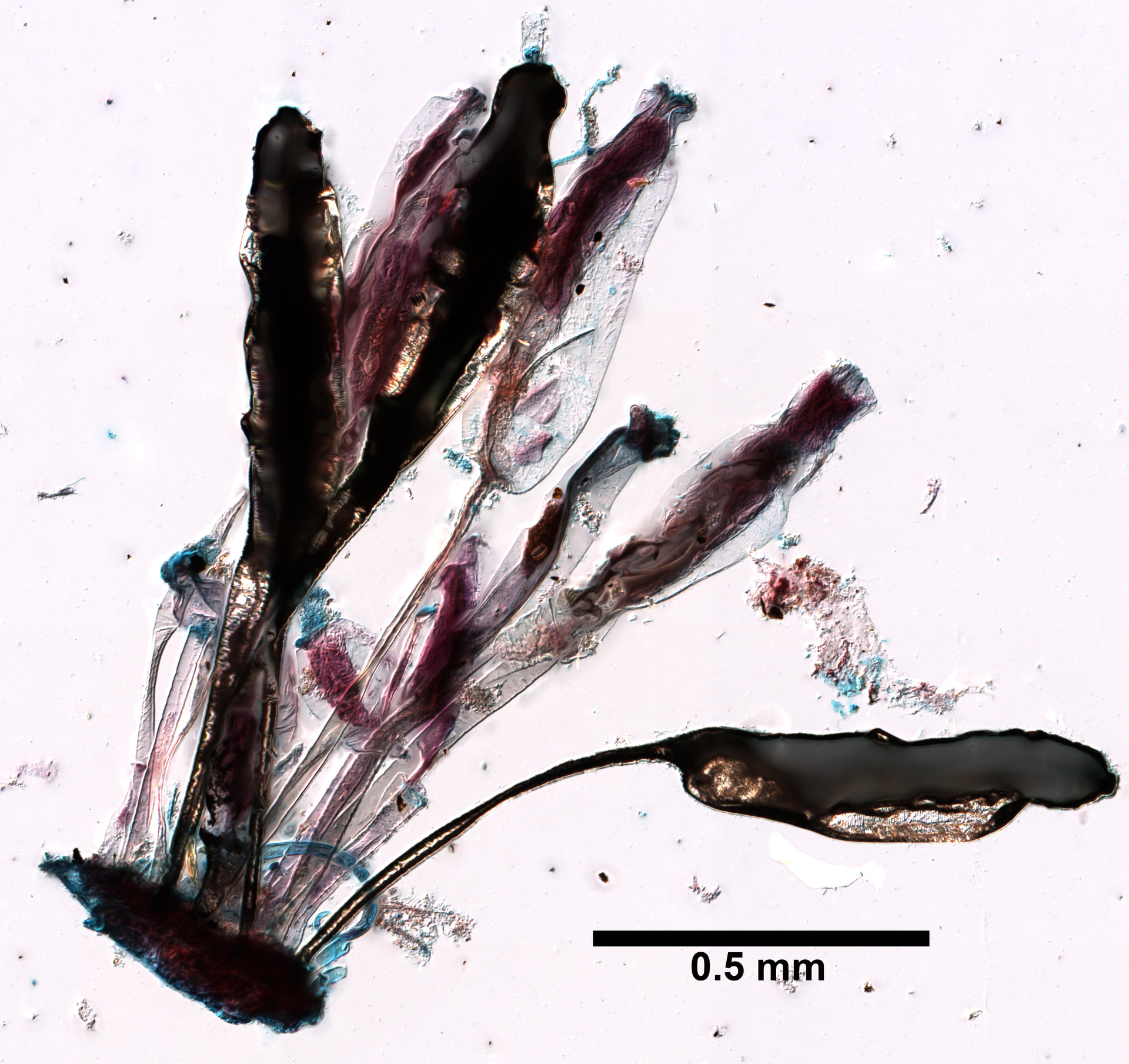

Scientific classification
- Kingdom: Animalia
- Phylum: Bryozoa
- Class: Gymnolaemata
- Order: Cheilostomatida
- Family: Candidae
- Genus: Tricellaria; Fleming, 1828

Synonyms
- Cellarina van Beneden, 1848; Ternicellaria d'Orbigny, 1851

= Tricellaria =

Genus of bryozoans

Tricellaria is a genus of bryozoans belonging to the family Candidae. The genus has an almost cosmopolitan distribution.

== Species ==
The following species are recognised in the genus Tricellaria:

- Tricellaria aculeata d'Orbigny, 1842
- Tricellaria aquilina Harmer, 1926
- Tricellaria arctica Busk, 1855
- Tricellaria catalinensis (Robertson, 1905)
- Tricellaria circumternata Soule, Soule & Chaney, 1995
- Tricellaria dubia Silén, 1941
- Tricellaria elongata (Smitt, 1868)
- Tricellaria erecta Robertson, 1900
- Tricellaria gracilis (Van Beneden, 1848)
- Tricellaria inopinata d'Hondt & Occhipinti Ambrogi, 1985
- Tricellaria longispinosa (Yanagi & Okada, 1918)
- Tricellaria multispinosa Liu, 1984
- Tricellaria occidentalis (Trask, 1857)
- Tricellaria porteri (MacGillivray, 1889)
- Tricellaria praescuta Osburn, 1950
- Tricellaria pribilofi Robertson, 1905
- Tricellaria scalariformis Harmer, 1926
- Tricellaria sympodia (Yanagi & Okada, 1918)
- Tricellaria ternata (Ellis & Solander, 1786)
- Tricellaria varia Hayward & Cook, 1979
- Tricellaria ziczac Silén, 1941
