= Galeojanolus =

Scientific classification
- Kingdom: Animalia
- Phylum: Mollusca
- Class: Gastropoda
- Order: Nudibranchia
- Suborder: Cladobranchia
- Family: Proctonotidae
- Genus: Galeojanolus; Miller, 1971

Species
- See text

Genus of gastropods

Galeojanolus is a genus of sea slugs, specifically nudibranchs, marine gastropod molluscs in the family Proctonotidae.

== Species ==
The only species in the genus Galeojanolus determined to date is:

- Galeojanolus ioannae Miller, 1971
