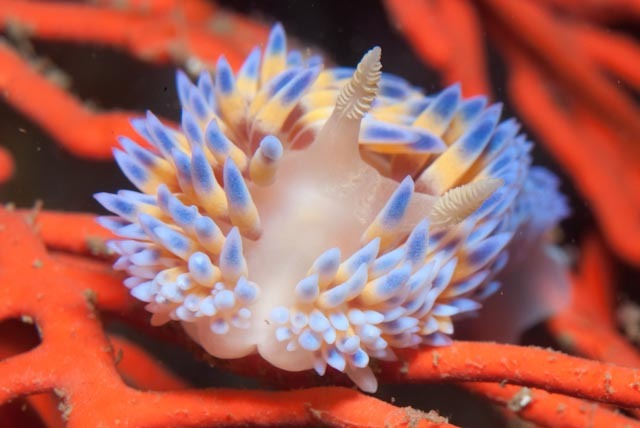

Scientific classification
- Kingdom: Animalia
- Phylum: Mollusca
- Class: Gastropoda
- Order: Nudibranchia
- Suborder: Cladobranchia
- Family: Janolidae
- Genus: Bonisa; Gosliner, 1981
- Species: B. nakaza

Binomial name
- Bonisa nakaza Gosliner, 1981

Synonyms
- Janolus nakaza (Gosliner, 1981)

= Gasflame nudibranch =

Gasflame nudibranch Bonisa nakaza

Species of gastropod

The gasflame nudibranch (Bonisa nakaza) is a very colourful species of nudibranch, or sea slug. It is a marine gastropod mollusc in the family Proctonotidae. Bonisa nakaza is the only species in the genus Bonisa.

== Distribution ==
This species is endemic to the South African coast and is found only from the Atlantic coast of the Cape Peninsula to Port Elizabeth, from the intertidal border to at least 30 m.

== Description ==
The gasflame nudibranch is a large nudibranch densely covered with cerata. It is usually between 50 and 80 mm in length, but may reach 120 mm. It has highly variable coloration and may be pale-bodied with orange ceratal tips, yellow-bodied with blue ceratal tips, salmon-coloured with brown tips or even black with blue ceratal tips. Its rhinophores are perfoliate and vary in coloration with rest of animal, separated by a rhinophoral crest of unknown function.

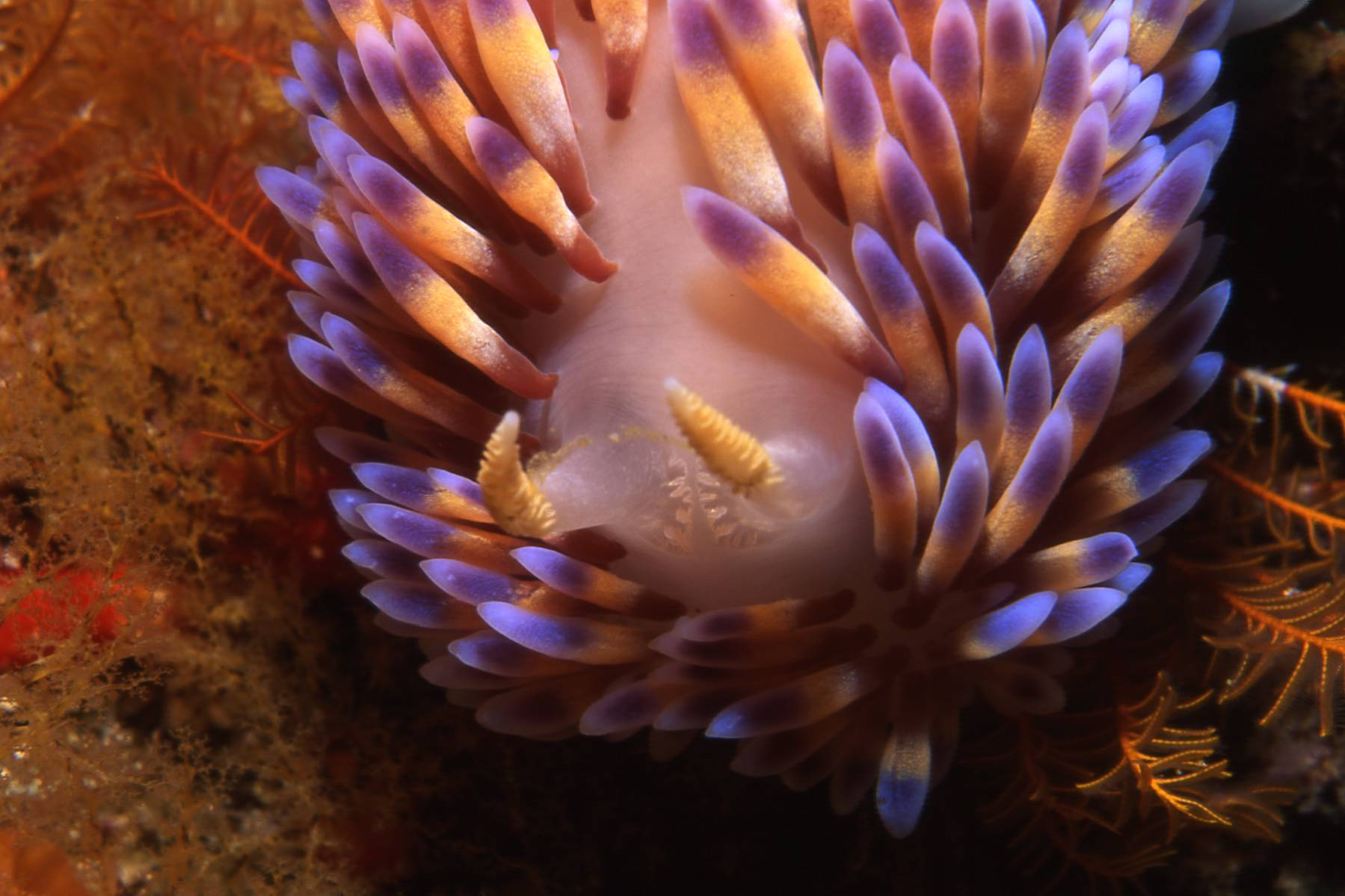
Rhinophores and rhinophoral crest

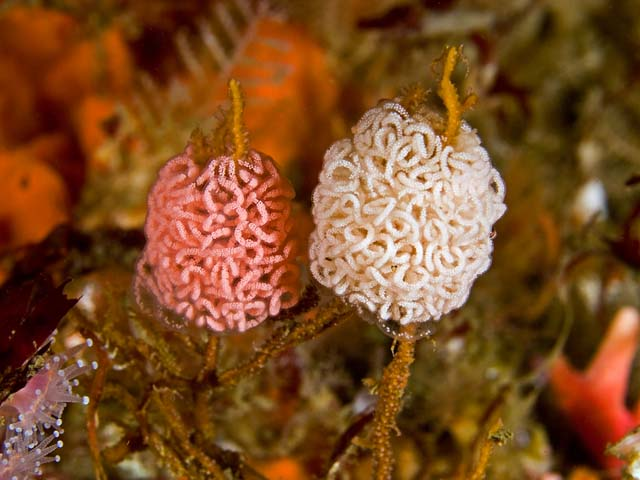
Egg ribbon

== Ecology ==
This species of nudibranch feeds on bryozoans. The egg mass is globular, highly convoluted and usually attached to branched organisms, such as gorgonian sea fans. It is usually cream coloured, but may be pinkish.
