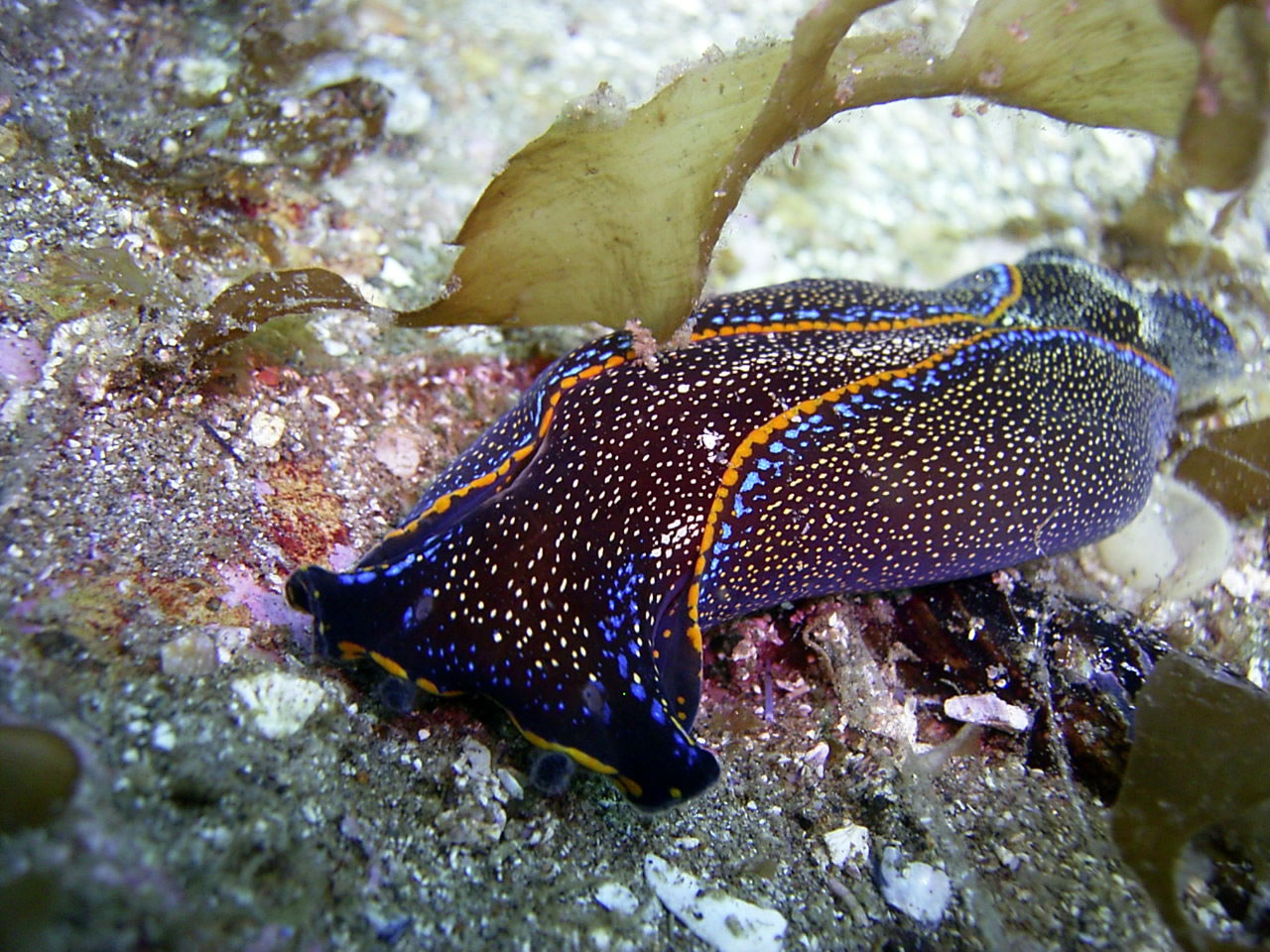
- From Santa Barbara, California

Scientific classification
- Kingdom: Animalia
- Phylum: Mollusca
- Class: Gastropoda
- Order: Cephalaspidea
- Family: Aglajidae
- Genus: Navanax
- Species: N. inermis

Binomial name
- Navanax inermis (Cooper, 1863)

Synonyms
- Doridium purpureum (Bergh, 1894); Posterobranchaea maculata d'Orbigny, 1835 (nomen oblitum); Strategus inermis J.G. Cooper, 1863 (basionym)

= Navanax inermis =

California aglaja

Species of gastropod

Navanax inermis, common name the California aglaja, is a large species of predatory sea slug, a marine opisthobranch gastropod mollusk in the family Aglajidae. Navanax is not a nudibranch, even though it somewhat resembles one; it belongs to a more ancient lineage of opisthobranchs called the cephalaspideans or head shield slugs and snails.

== Description ==
The body of N. inermis can be tan, black, or purple, with yellowish streaks. Yellow or orange streaks and blue dots are visible on the margins. It has two large parapodial folds that run the length of either side of the body, and almost touch at the midsection. This species possesses a small internal shell. Individuals are typically between 2.5 and 10 inches in length.

Navanax inermis does not possess a radula or organs associated with vision.

== Distribution and habitat ==
This species occurs in the eastern Pacific Ocean and Gulf of California. Its range is from Monterey, California to Baja California.

Navanax inermis can commonly be found on rocky intertidal regions and subtidal mudflats.

== Ecology ==
=== Diet ===
Navanax inermis is a voracious carnivorous predator. Common prey items include other sea slugs, like bubble snails and nudibranchs, and small fish. As N. inermis lacks visual perception, it finds prey by using its chemoreceptors to follow the slime trails of other organisms.

=== Reproduction ===
Navanax inermis is a simultaneous hermaphrodite. Copulation can occur in groups, commonly referred to as chains, of up to four individuals. In the southern portion of its range, N. inermis spawns year round, producing upwards of 800,000 eggs at a time. After 7 to 19 days of development, embryos are released and live as plankton.

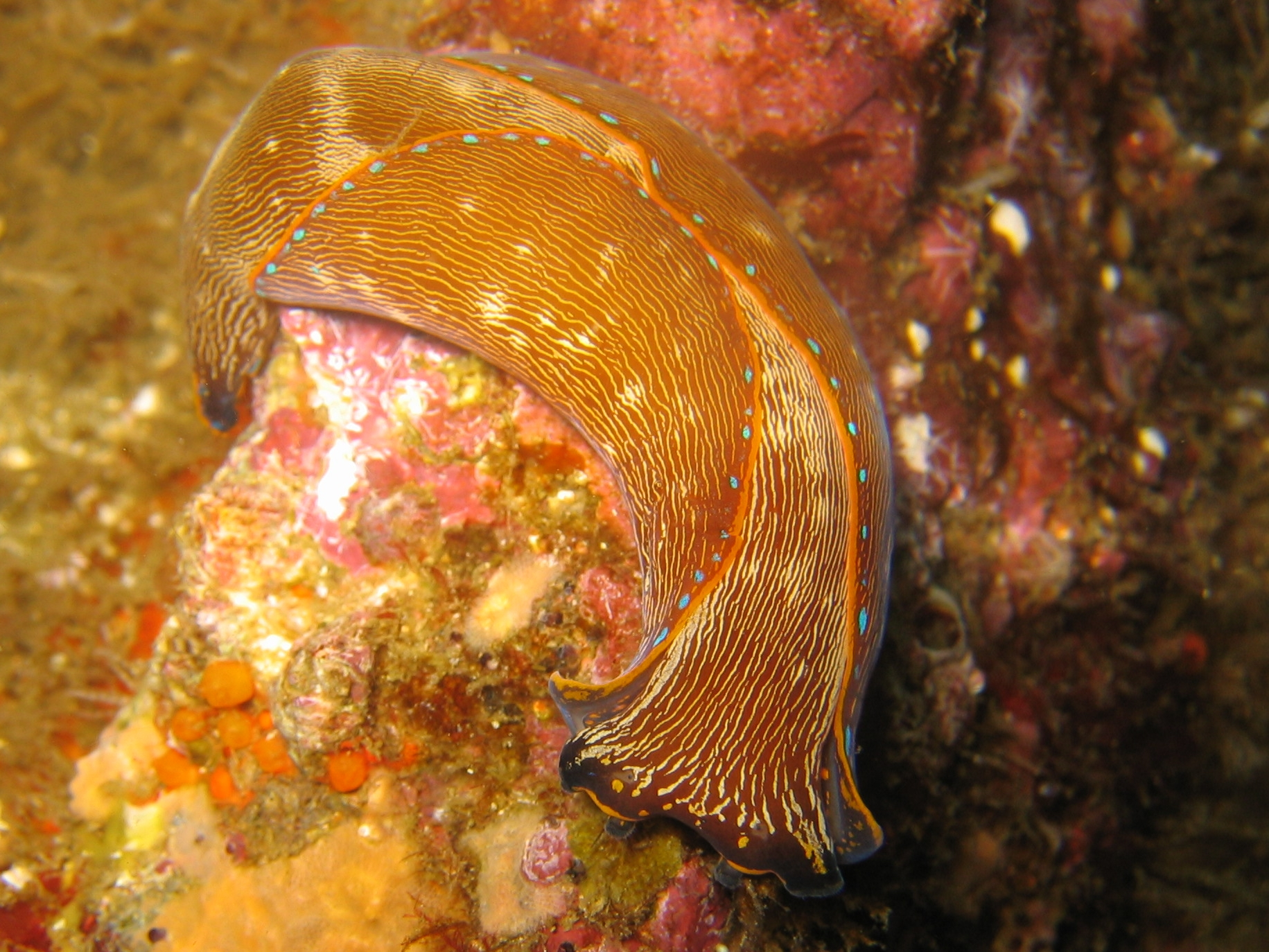
N. inermis with a yellow base color

=== Locomotion ===
Navanax inermis slides over surfaces with the help of a mucopolysaccharide slime trail.

=== Defense ===
When disturbed, N. inermis secretes a bright yellow substance into its slime trail, which can persist for several hours. This secretion causes some other organisms to break pursuit of the slug.
