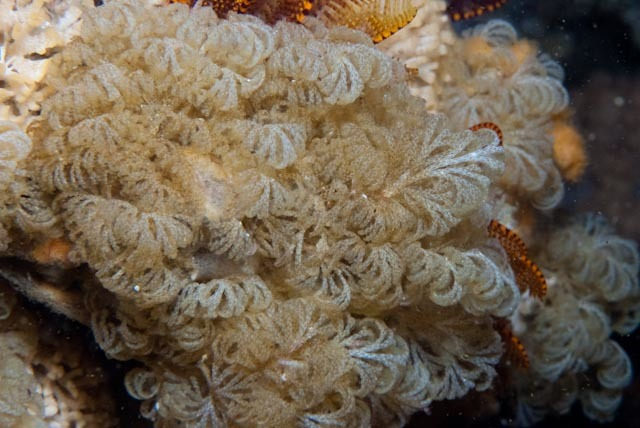
- Menipea crispa

Scientific classification
- Kingdom: Animalia
- Phylum: Bryozoa
- Class: Gymnolaemata
- Order: Cheilostomatida
- Family: Candidae
- Genus: Menipea; Lamouroux, 1812

Synonyms
- Craspedozoum MacGillivray, 1886

= Menipea =

Genus of bryozoans

Menipea is a genus of bryozoans belonging to the family Candidae.

The genus has an almost cosmopolitan distribution.

== Species ==
The following species are recognised in the genus Menipea:

- †Menipea biaviculata Maplestone, 1900
- †Menipea bicellata Maplestone, 1900
- Menipea columnaris d'Hondt, 1985
- Menipea crassa (Canu & Bassler, 1929)
- Menipea crispa (Pallas, 1766)
- †Menipea elongata (Canu & Bassler, 1935)
- Menipea flagellifera Busk, 1884
- †Menipea innocua Waters, 1882
- Menipea integra Ortmann, 1890
- Menipea kempi Hastings, 1943
- Menipea ligulata (MacGillivray, 1886)
- †Menipea lineata MacGillivray, 1895
- Menipea marionensis Busk, 1884
- Menipea multipartita (Yang & Lu, 1981)
- Menipea multiseriata Busk, 1852
- Menipea ornata (Busk, 1852)
- Menipea patagonica Busk, 1852
- †Menipea retroversa Maplestone, 1900
- Menipea roborata (Hincks, 1881)
- Menipea salvati d'Hondt, 1996
- Menipea spicata (MacGillivray, 1886)
- Menipea triseriata Busk, 1852
- †Menipea uniserialis Maplestone, 1911
- Menipea unyoi Okada, 1918
- Menipea vectifera Harmer, 1923
- Menipea vera Gordon, 1986
- Menipea zelandica Hastings, 1943
