= Scrupocellaria =

Scientific classification
- Kingdom: Animalia
- Phylum: Bryozoa
- Class: Gymnolaemata
- Order: Cheilostomatida
- Family: Candidae
- Genus: Scrupocellaria van Beneden, 1845

Synonyms
- Scupocellaria

Genus of bryozoans

Scrupocellaria is a genus of bryozoans belonging to the family Candidae. The genus has a cosmopolitan distribution.

== Species ==
The following species are recognised in the genus Scrupocellaria:

- Scrupocellaria aegeensis Harmelin, 1969
- Scrupocellaria delilii (Audouin, 1826)
- Scrupocellaria harmeri Osburn, 1947
- Scrupocellaria incurvata Waters, 1897
- Scrupocellaria inermis Norman, 1867
- Scrupocellaria intermedia Norman, 1893
- Scrupocellaria jullieni Hayward, 1978
- Scrupocellaria minor Kluge, 1915
- Scrupocellaria minuta (Kirkpatrick, 1888)
- Scrupocellaria muricata (Lamouroux, 1816)
- Scrupocellaria puelcha (d'Orbigny, 1841)
- Scrupocellaria scrupea Busk, 1851
- Scrupocellaria scruposa (Linnaeus, 1758)
