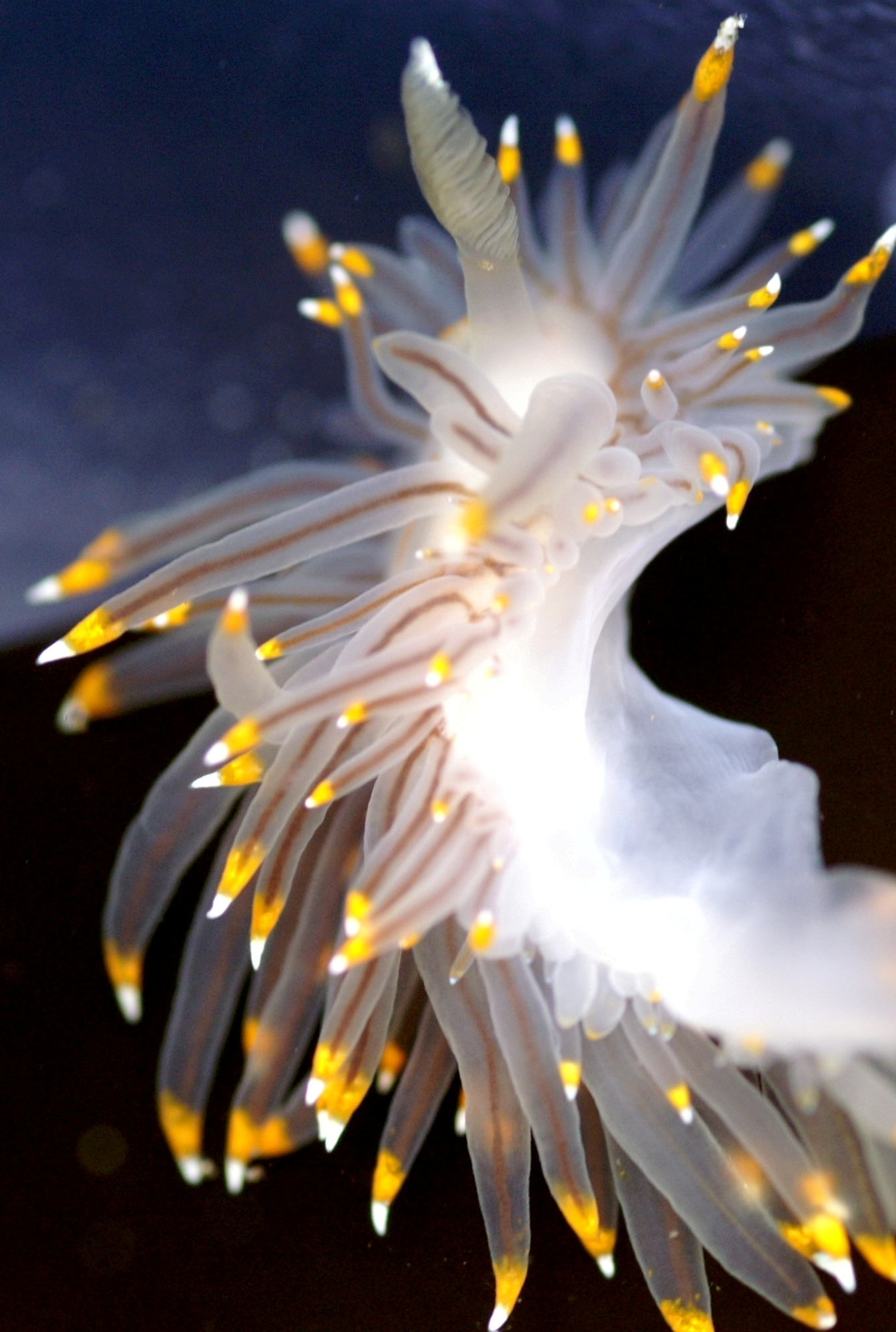

Scientific classification
- Kingdom: Animalia
- Phylum: Mollusca
- Class: Gastropoda
- Order: Nudibranchia
- Suborder: Cladobranchia
- Superfamily: Proctonotoidea
- Family: Janolidae; Pruvot-Fol, 1933

Genera
- See text

Synonyms
- Janinae Gray, 1847 (inv.); Antiopidae Locard, 1886 (inv.); Antiopellidae Odhner, 1934

= Janolidae =

Family of gastropods

Janolidae is a family of sea slugs, nudibranchs, marine gastropod molluscs, in the clade Euthyneura.

== Genera ==
Genera in the family Janolidae include:

- Antiopella Hoyle, 1902
- Bonisa Gosliner, 1981
- Galeojanolus Miller, 1971
- Janolus Bergh, 1884

Genera brought into synonymy

- Janus Vérany, 1844: synonym of Janolus Bergh, 1884
