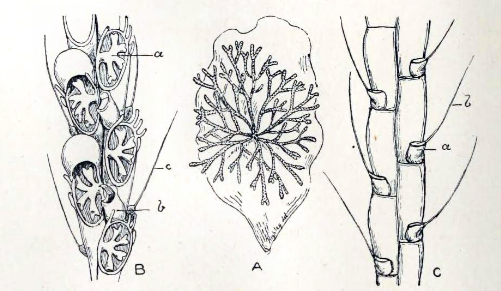
- Scrupocellaria reptans

Scientific classification
- Kingdom: Animalia
- Phylum: Bryozoa
- Class: Gymnolaemata
- Order: Cheilostomatida
- Suborder: Flustrina
- Family: Candidae d'Orbigny, 1851

Genera
- See text

Synonyms
- Cabereidae Busk, 1852; Scrupocellariidae Levinsen, 1909

= Candidae =

Family of moss animals

Candidae is a family of gymnolaematan bryozoans (sea mats).

== Genera ==
The following genera are recognised in the family Candidae:

- Amastigia Busk, 1852
- Aquiloniella Vieira, Spencer Jones, Winston, Migotto & Marques, 2014
- Aspiscellaria Vieira, Spencer Jones, Winston, Migotto & Marques, 2014
- †Bactrellaria Marsson, 1887
- Bathycellaria Vieira, Spencer Jones, Winston, Migotto & Marques, 2014
- Bobinella d'Hondt, 1981
- Bugulopsis Verrill, 1880
- Caberea Lamouroux, 1816
- Cabereopsis Hasenbank, 1932
- Canda Lamouroux, 1816
- Candoscrupocellaria d'Hondt & Gordon, 1996
- Cradoscrupocellaria Vieira, Spencer Jones & Winston, 2013
- Diplobicellariella d'Hondt, 1985
- Emma Gray, 1843
- †Eoscrupocellaria Voigt, 1991
- Eupaxia Hasenbank, 1932
- Hoplitella Levinsen, 1909
- Licornia van Beneden, 1850
- Maplestonia MacGillivray, 1885
- Menipea Lamouroux, 1812
- Monartron Canu & Bassler, 1929
- Notoplites Harmer, 1923
- Notoplitesigia d'Hondt, 1987
- Paralicornia Vieira, Spencer Jones, Winston, Migotto & Marques, 2014
- Penemia Gordon, 1986
- Pomocellaria Vieira, Spencer Jones, Winston, Migotto & Marques, 2014
- Pseudoporicellaria d'Hondt, 1987
- Scrupocaberea Vieira, Spencer Jones, Winston, Migotto & Marques, 2014
- Scrupocellaria van Beneden, 1845
- Scrupocellarinella d'Hondt & Schopf, 1985
- Scutoplites Reverter-Gil, Souto & Berning, 2025
- Semibugula Kluge, 1929
- Sinocellaria Vieira, Spencer Jones, Winston, Migotto & Marques, 2014
- †Synaptacella Maplestone, 1911
- Tricellaria Fleming, 1828
