= Pseudotritonia gracilidens =

Scientific classification
- Kingdom: Animalia
- Phylum: Mollusca
- Class: Gastropoda
- Order: Nudibranchia
- Suborder: Janolacea
- Family: Curnonidae
- Genus: Pseudotritonia
- Species: P. gracilidens

Binomial name
- Pseudotritonia gracilidens Odhner, 1944

Species of gastropod

Pseudotritonia gracilidens is a species of sea slug, a dorid nudibranch, a shell-less marine gastropod mollusk in the family Curnonidae.

== Distribution ==
Pseudotritonia gracilidens is found along the Atlantic sector of the Antarctic coast and islands and in the Southern Ocean. They have been found at depths between 3 and 40 meters (10 and 131 ft).
