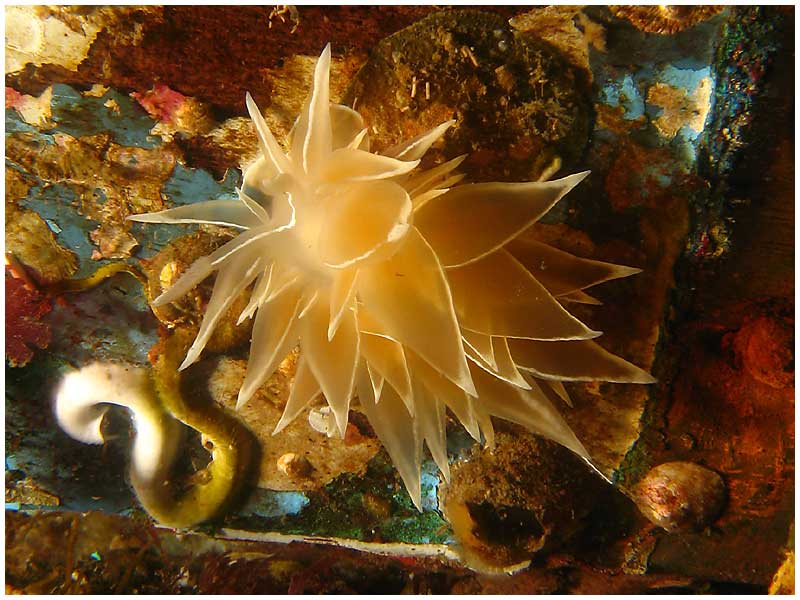
- Dirona albolineata in Puget Sound

Scientific classification
- Kingdom: Animalia
- Phylum: Mollusca
- Class: Gastropoda
- Order: Nudibranchia
- Suborder: Janolacea
- Family: Dironidae
- Genus: Dirona
- Species: D. albolineata

Binomial name
- Dirona albolineata MacFarland in Cockerell & Eliot, 1905

= Dirona albolineata =

Species of gastropod

The alabaster nudibranch, white-lined Dirona, or frosted sea slug (Dirona albolineata) is an Eastern Pacific Ocean opisthobranch gastropod mollusk in the family Dironidae.

== Distribution ==
This species occurs in the Eastern Pacific Ocean from Alaska to San Diego, California.

== Description ==
Dirona albolineata can reach a length of about 180 mm (7.1 in). This species, like others in the genus, is translucent with large, broad and quite flat cerata. In these nudibranchs the cerata lack cnidosacs.

The most common D. albolineata is translucent with opalescent white outlining the cerata and the midline of the tail, but the color varies from white through rose pink, pale orange, lavender to a rufous shade.

== Biology ==
These nudibranchs are carnivores that feed on a wide variety of prey, mostly on bryozoans, on small crustaceans, hydroids, ascidians, and snails. They can be found all the year around in the shallow subtidal cold waters, at depths of 0 to 28 m.

They are simultaneous hermaphrodites. Consequently both individuals darts their penis to penetrate the body of the other, then both act simultaneously as male and female. Spawning occurs in both the winter and summer.

== Gallery ==
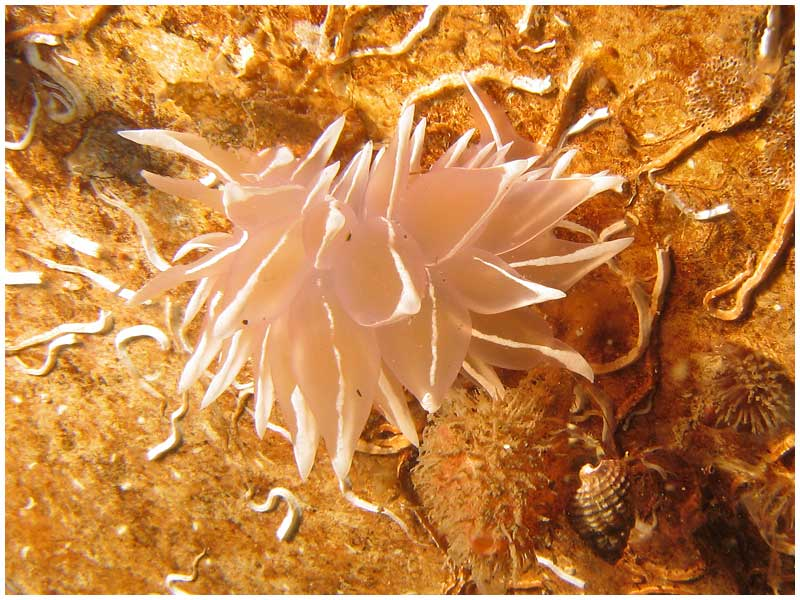
Dirona albolineata

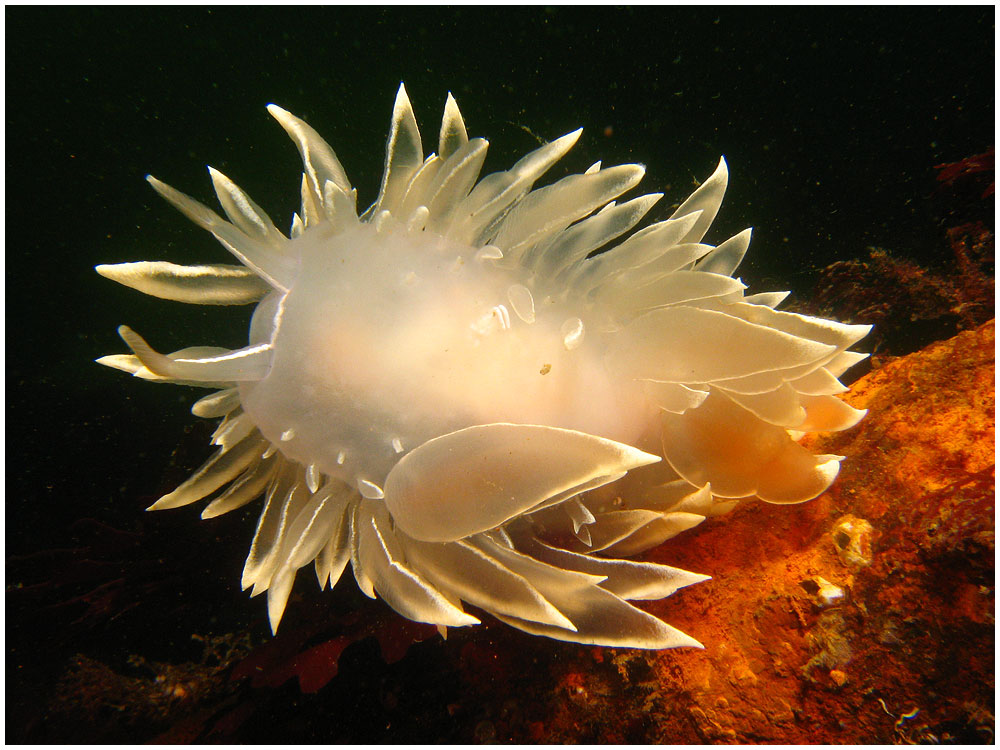
D. albolineata at Sund Rock

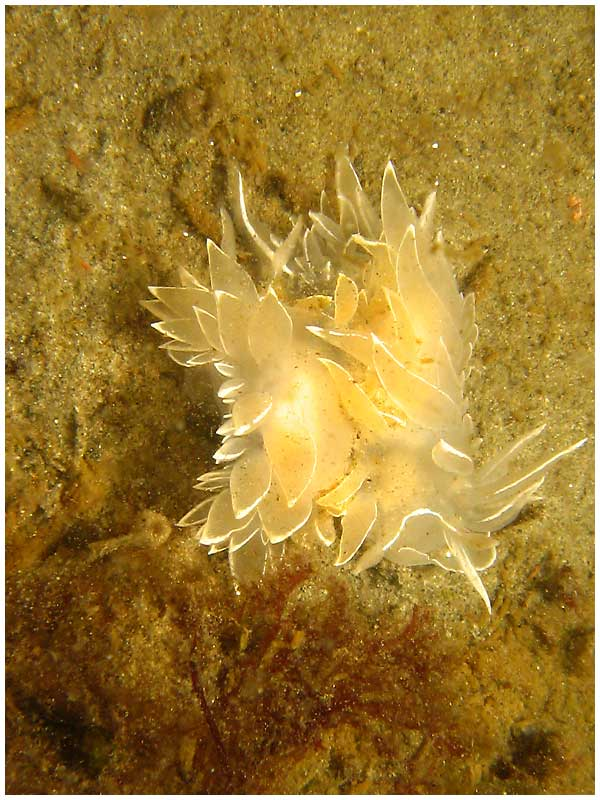
Mating couple

Video clip

== Bibliography ==
- Gary R. McDonald, University of California Santa Cruz, Nudibranch Systematic Index, University of California Santa Cruz, in Institute of Marine Sciences
- Behrens, David W. 1991. Pacific Coast Nudibranchs. Sea Challengers: Monterey, California.
- Goddard, J.H.R. 1998. A summary of the prey of nudibranch molluscs from Cape Arago, Oregon. Opisthobranch Newsletter, 24: 11-14.
- Robilliard, G.A. (1971) Predation by the nudibranch Dirona albolineata on three species of prosobranchs. Pacific Science, 25: 429-435.
- Turgeon, D. D., A. E. Bogan, E. V. Coan, W. K. Emerson, W. G. Lyons, W. Pratt, et al. (1988) Common and scientific names of aquatic invertebrates from the United States and Canada: mollusks, American Fisheries Society Special Publication 16
- Turgeon, D. D., J. F. Quinn, Jr., A. E. Bogan, E. V. Coan, F. G. Hochberg, W. G. Lyons, et al. (1998) Common and scientific names of aquatic invertebrates from the United States and Canada: Mollusks, 2nd ed., American Fisheries Society Special Publication 26
