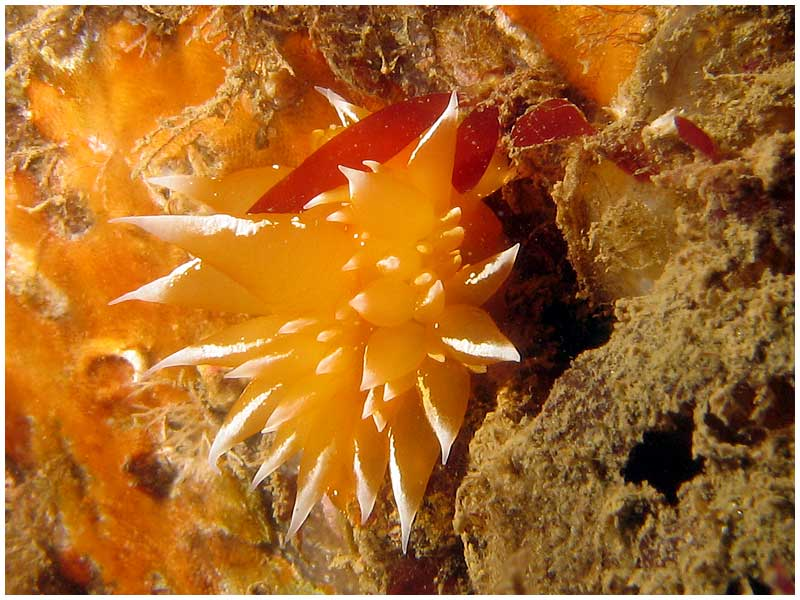
- Dirona pellucida

Scientific classification
- Kingdom: Animalia
- Phylum: Mollusca
- Class: Gastropoda
- Order: Nudibranchia
- Suborder: Janolacea
- Family: Dironidae
- Genus: Dirona
- Species: D. pellucida

Binomial name
- Dirona pellucida Volodchenko, 1941

= Dirona pellucida =

Species of gastropod

Dirona pellucida is a species of sea slug, a northern Pacific Ocean nudibranch, a marine, opisthobranch gastropod mollusk in the family Dironidae.

This species feeds on the bryozoan species Bugula pacifica.

== Distribution ==
This nudibranch occurs from Oregon to Alaska, and across the Bering Sea south to Japan and Korea.

== Description ==
This species, like others in the genus, is translucent with large, broad cerata. The color is various shades of orange, with a white line on the edge of all of the cerata.
