= Pseudotritonia quadrangularis =

Scientific classification
- Kingdom: Animalia
- Phylum: Mollusca
- Class: Gastropoda
- Order: Nudibranchia
- Suborder: Janolacea
- Family: Curnonidae
- Genus: Pseudotritonia
- Species: P. quadrangularis

Binomial name
- Pseudotritonia quadrangularis Thiele, 1912

Species of gastropod

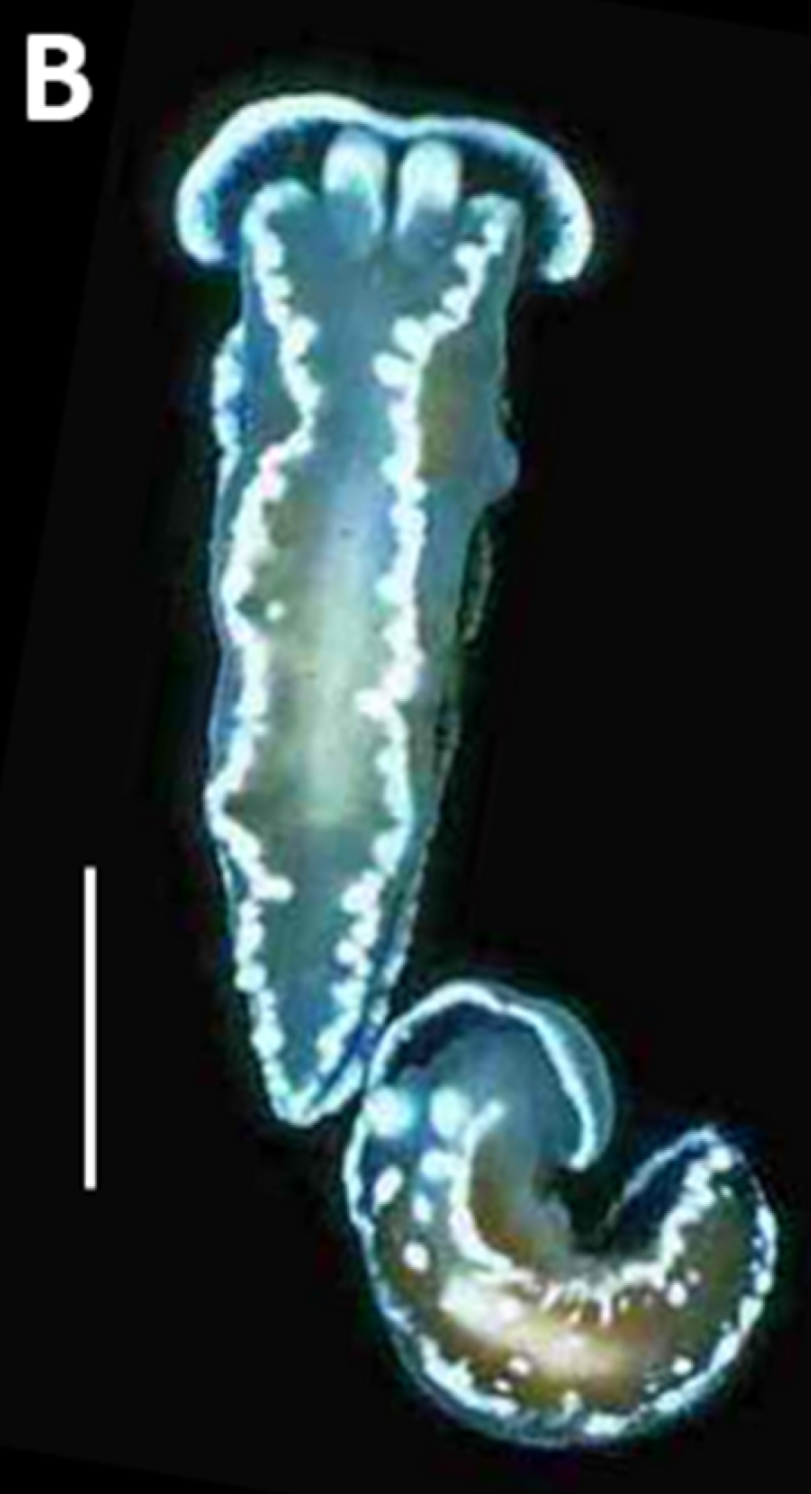
Pseudotritonia quadrangularis specimen

Pseudotritonia quadrangularis is a species of sea slug, an aeolid nudibranch, a shell-less marine gastropod mollusk in the family Charcotiidae.

== Distribution ==
Pseudotritionia quadrangularis are found in Antarctic waters, the Antarctic peninsula, and other nearby islands.
