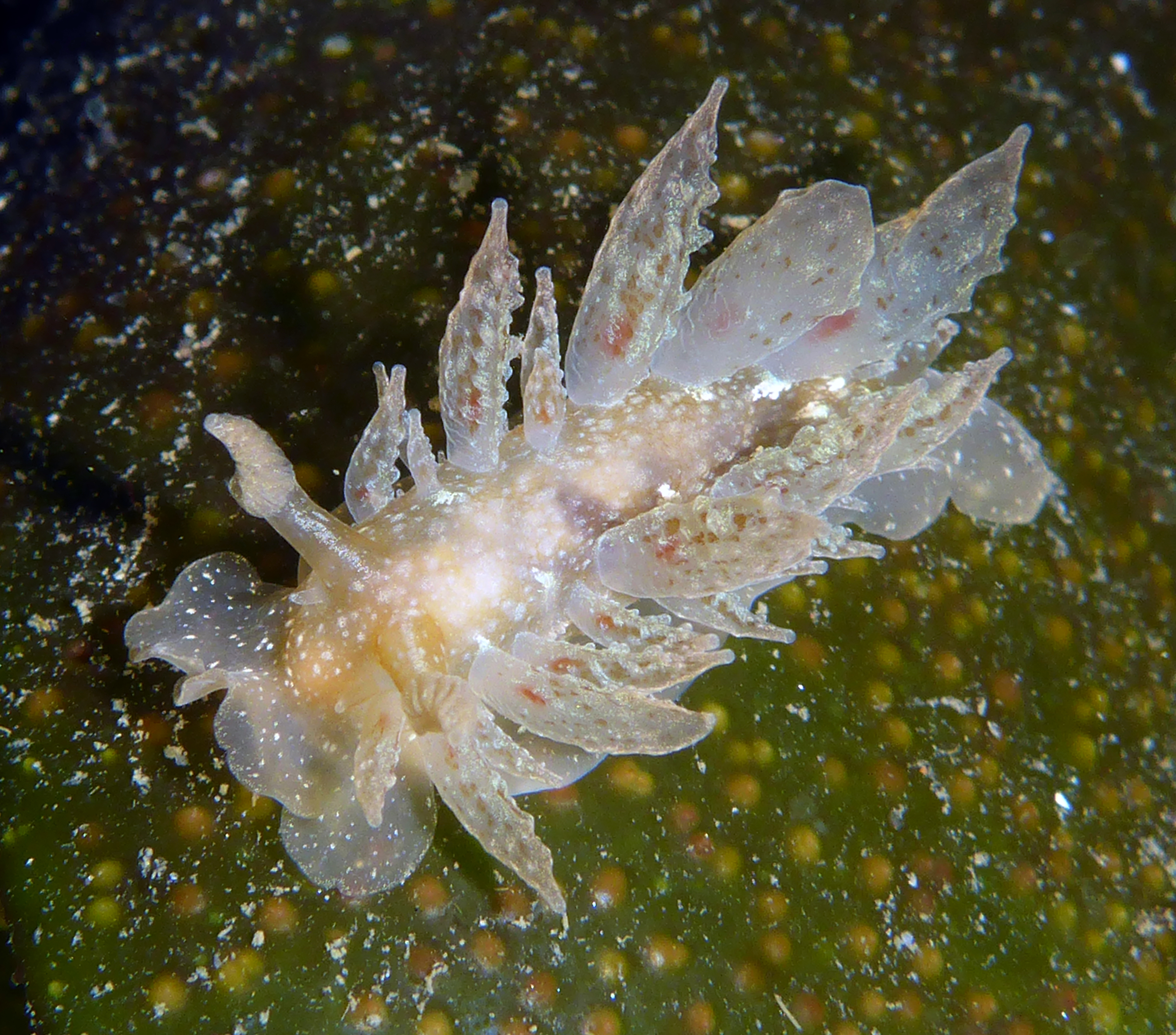
- Dirona picta from Pillar Point, California

Scientific classification
- Domain: Eukaryota
- Kingdom: Animalia
- Phylum: Mollusca
- Class: Gastropoda
- Order: Nudibranchia
- Suborder: Cladobranchia
- Family: Dironidae
- Genus: Dirona
- Species: D. picta

Binomial name
- Dirona picta Volodchenko, 1941

= Dirona picta =

Species of gastropod

Dirona picta, common name colorful dirona, is a species of sea slug, an Eastern Pacific Ocean nudibranch, a marine, opisthobranch gastropod mollusk in the family Dironidae.

== Distribution ==
This marine species occurs from Northern Oregon, USA to Baja California Sur, Mexico. Also reported from Japan.

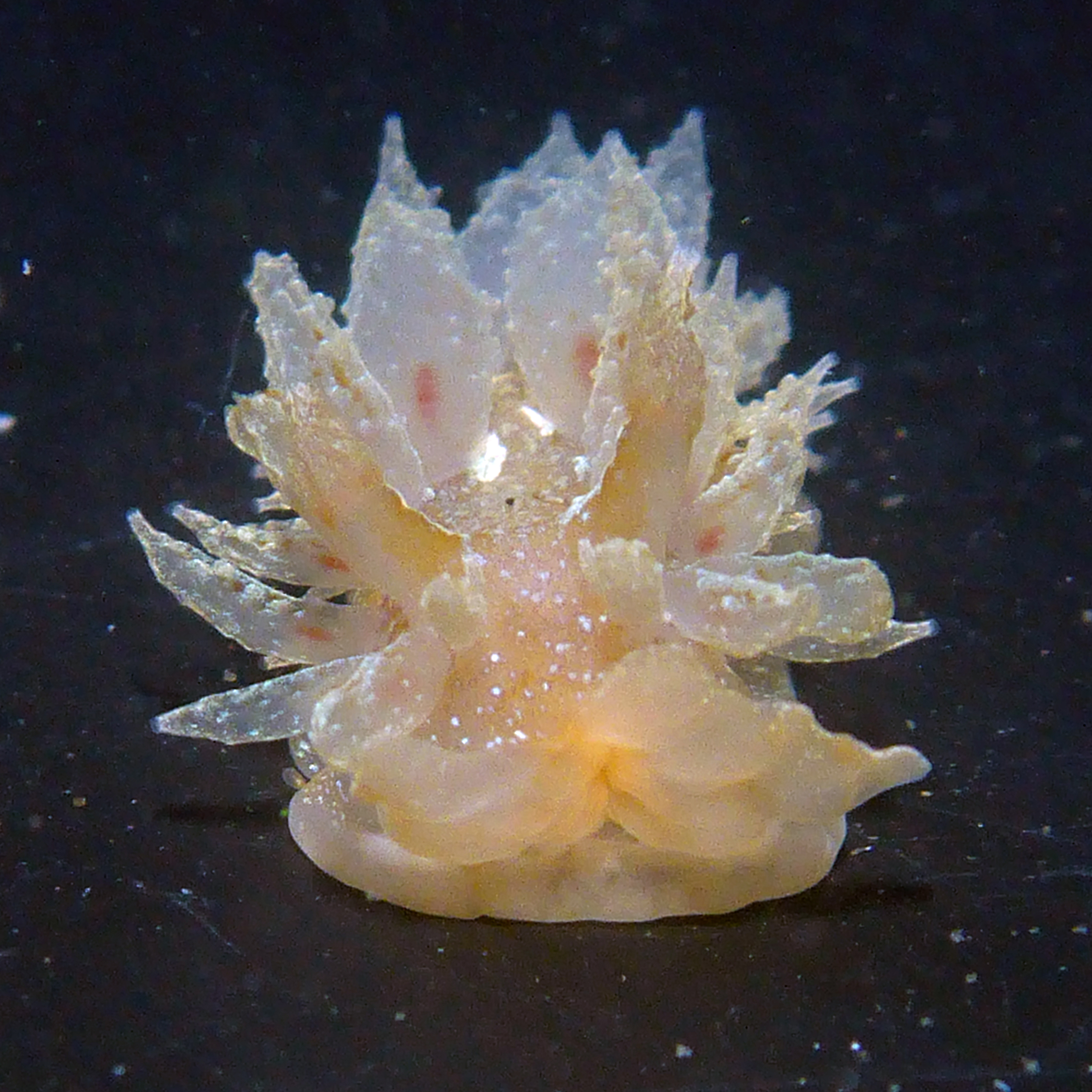
Dirona picta from Santa Cruz, California head-on view
