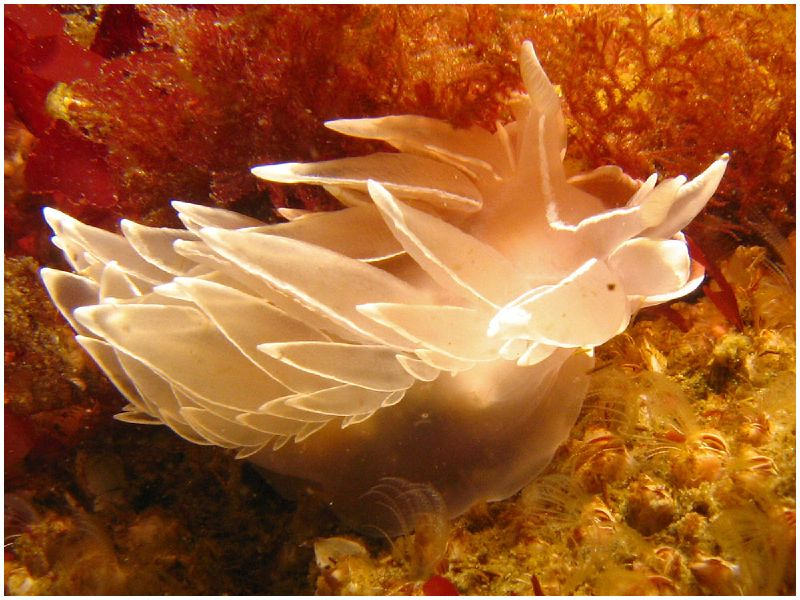
- Dirona albolineata

Scientific classification
- Kingdom: Animalia
- Phylum: Mollusca
- Class: Gastropoda
- Order: Nudibranchia
- Suborder: Cladobranchia
- Family: Dironidae
- Genus: Dirona; MacFarland, 1905

= Dirona =

Genus of gastropods

Dirona is a genus of sea slugs, Pacific Ocean nudibranchs, marine, opisthobranch gastropod mollusks in the family Dironidae.

Dirona is the type genus of the family Dironidae.

This genus is characterized by large, broad cerata.

== Distribution ==
These nudibranchs live on the West Coast of North America and Central America, some extending west into Japanese and Russian waters.

== Habitat ==
Dironids live in various habitats, including the intertidal zone of rocky shores, bays and estuaries.

== Life habits ==
Most species in this genus eat various species of bryozoans. Some also feed on hydroids and ascidians.

== Species ==
Species within this genus include:

- Dirona akkeshiensis Baba, 1957
- Dirona albolineata MacFarland, 1905
- Dirona pellucida Volodchenko, 1941
- Dirona picta MacFarland, 1905

Species brought into synonymy

- Dirona aurantia Hurst, 1966: synonym of Dirona pellucida Volodchenko, 1941
