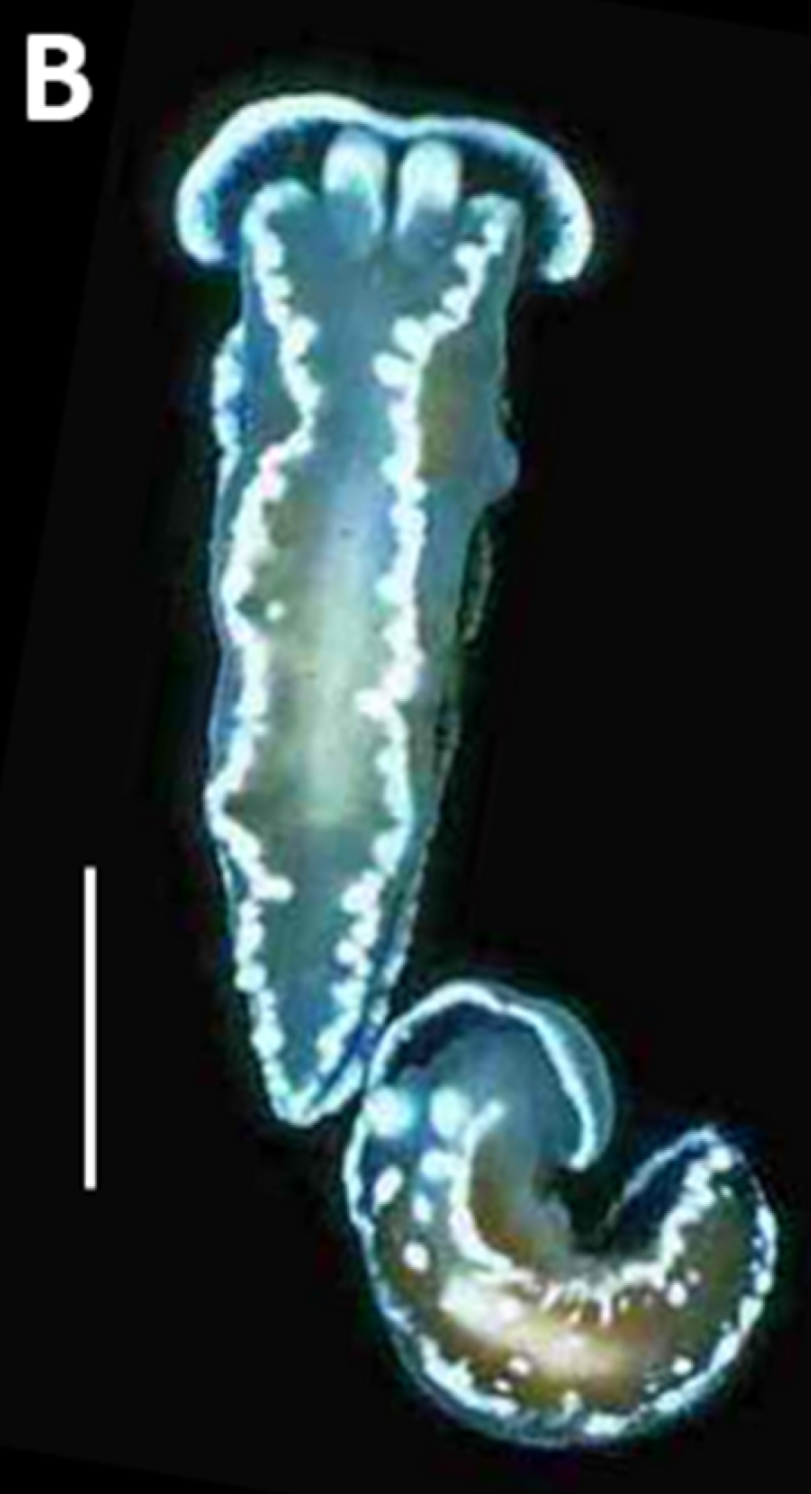
- Specimen of Pseudotritonia quadrangularis from the Antarctic Peninsula

Scientific classification
- Kingdom: Animalia
- Phylum: Mollusca
- Class: Gastropoda
- Order: Nudibranchia
- Suborder: Cladobranchia
- Family: Curnonidae
- Genus: Pseudotritonia; Thiele, 1912

Synonyms
- Telarma Odhner, 1934

= Pseudotritonia =

Genus of sea slugs

Pseudotritonia is a small genus of sea slugs.

Species in it include:

- Pseudotritonia antarctica (Odhner, 1934)
- Pseudotritonia gracilidens (Odhner, 1944)
- Pseudotritonia quadrangularis (Thiele, 1912)
