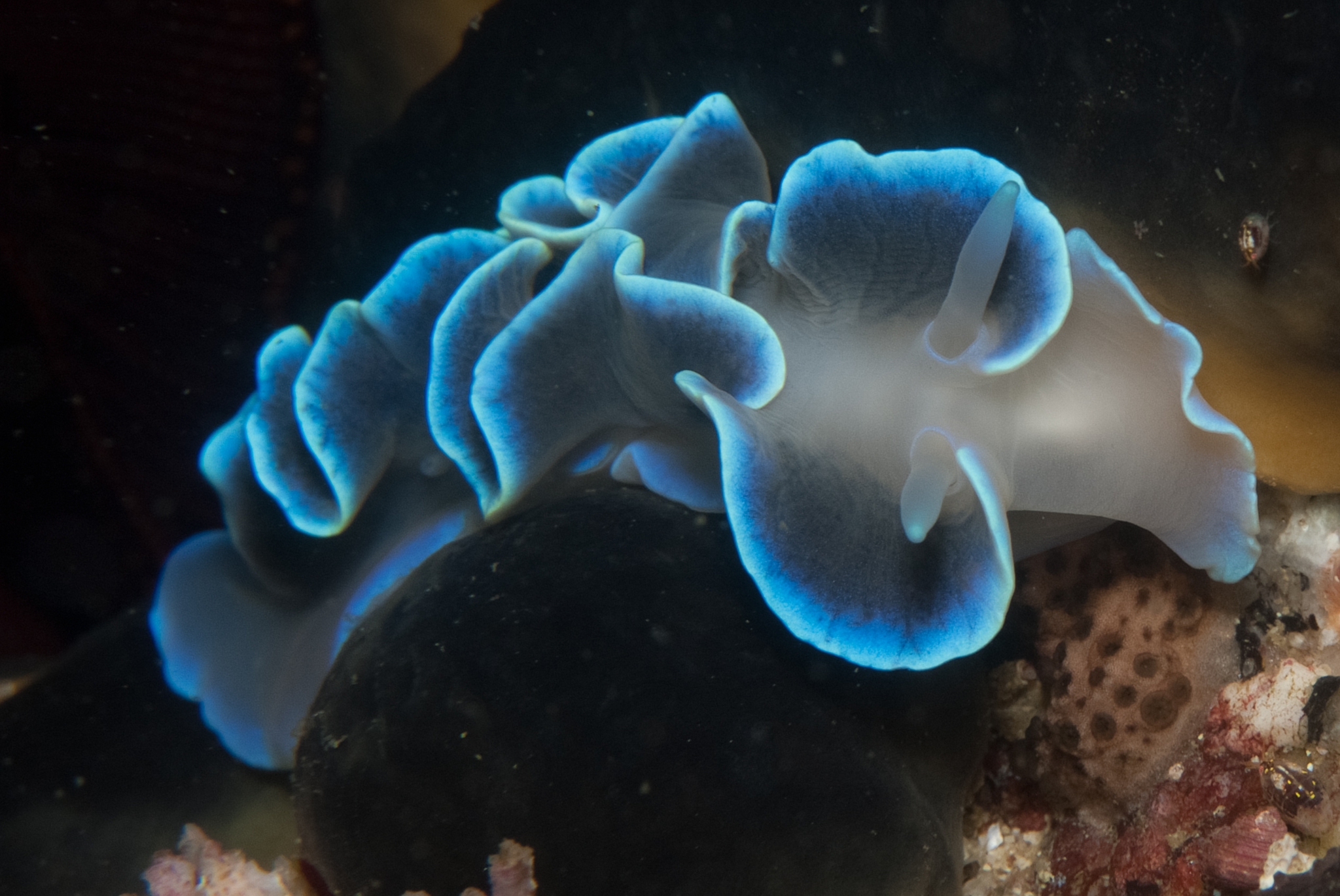

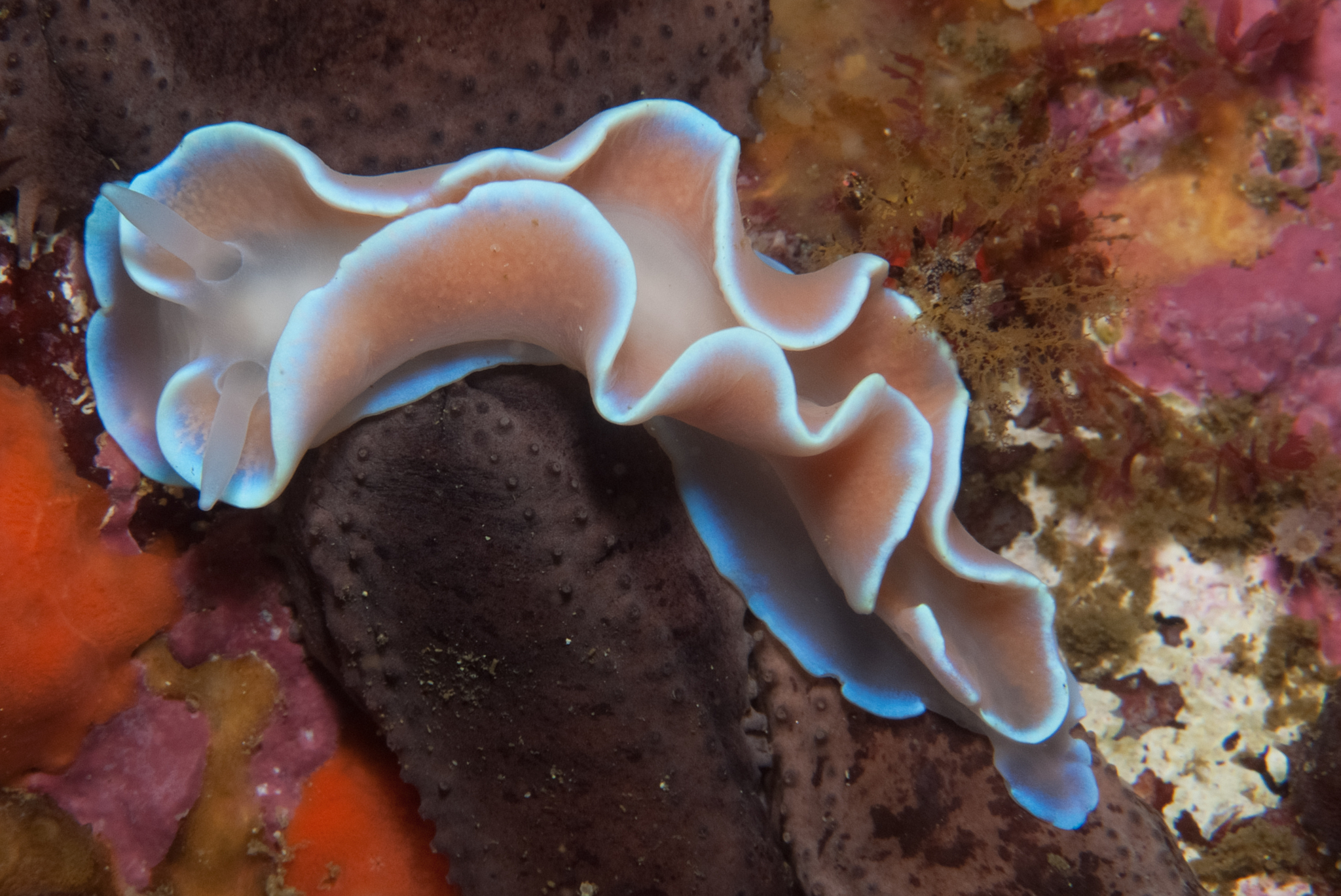
- The frilled nudibranch, Leminda millecra

Scientific classification
- Kingdom: Animalia
- Phylum: Mollusca
- Class: Gastropoda
- Order: Nudibranchia
- Suborder: Janolacea
- Superfamily: Proctonotoidea
- Family: Lemindidae; R. J. Griffiths, 1985
- Genus: Leminda; R. J. Griffiths, 1985
- Species: L. millecra

Binomial name
- Leminda millecra R. J. Griffiths, 1985

= Leminda =

Genus of gastropods

Leminda is a genus of nudibranchs, shell-less marine gastropod molluscs or sea slugs, and the only member of the family Lemindidae. It is a monotypic genus, represented by the single species Leminda millecra, the frilled nudibranch. It has so far only been found around the South African coast.

== Distribution ==
This species is endemic to the South African coast and is found from the Atlantic coast of the Cape Peninsula to Port Elizabeth at 10–40 m. Deep water specimens have been trawled off the KwaZulu-Natal coast.

== Description ==
It is a large (up to 90 mm) smooth-bodied nudibranch with a frilled appearance. The body of these animals is robust and elevated, and has a velum, or anterior veil. The body may have pink or brown pigmentation, depending on the food colour in its digestive gland ducts, with the margin of the mantle having a white or bright bluish edge. The margin is expanded and waving with large sinuous folds, and is held above the body. It bears an anterior break along the mantle edge between its rhinophores (chemosensory tentacles), which are pale, smooth, tapering, and do not retract into pockets.

The foot is large and well-developed. The radula is broad and arranged in multiple series with hook-shaped teeth. The digestive gland branches extensively into the mantle margin. The animal has no eyes. A bag used in copulation opens between the male and female reproductive openings

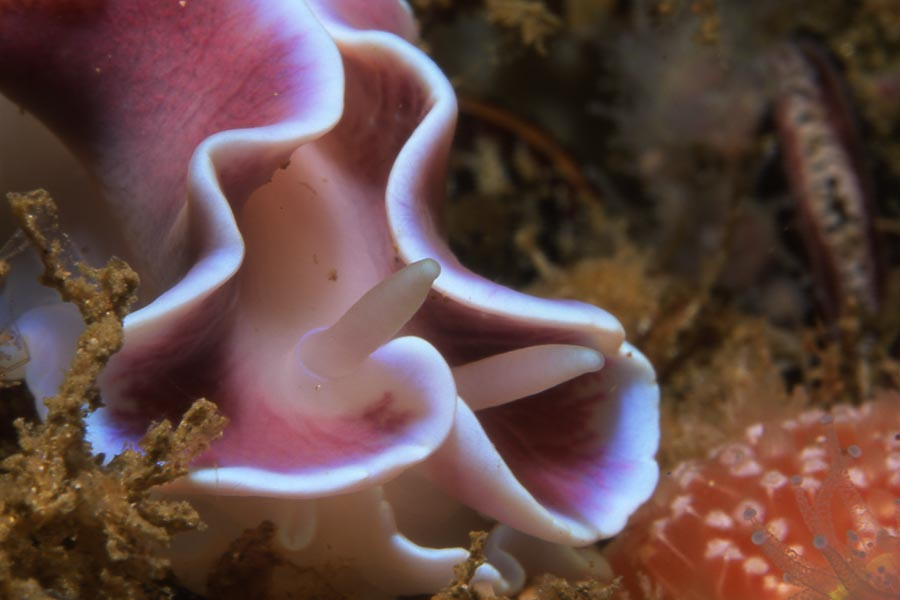
Close-up of the head showing the smooth rhinophores

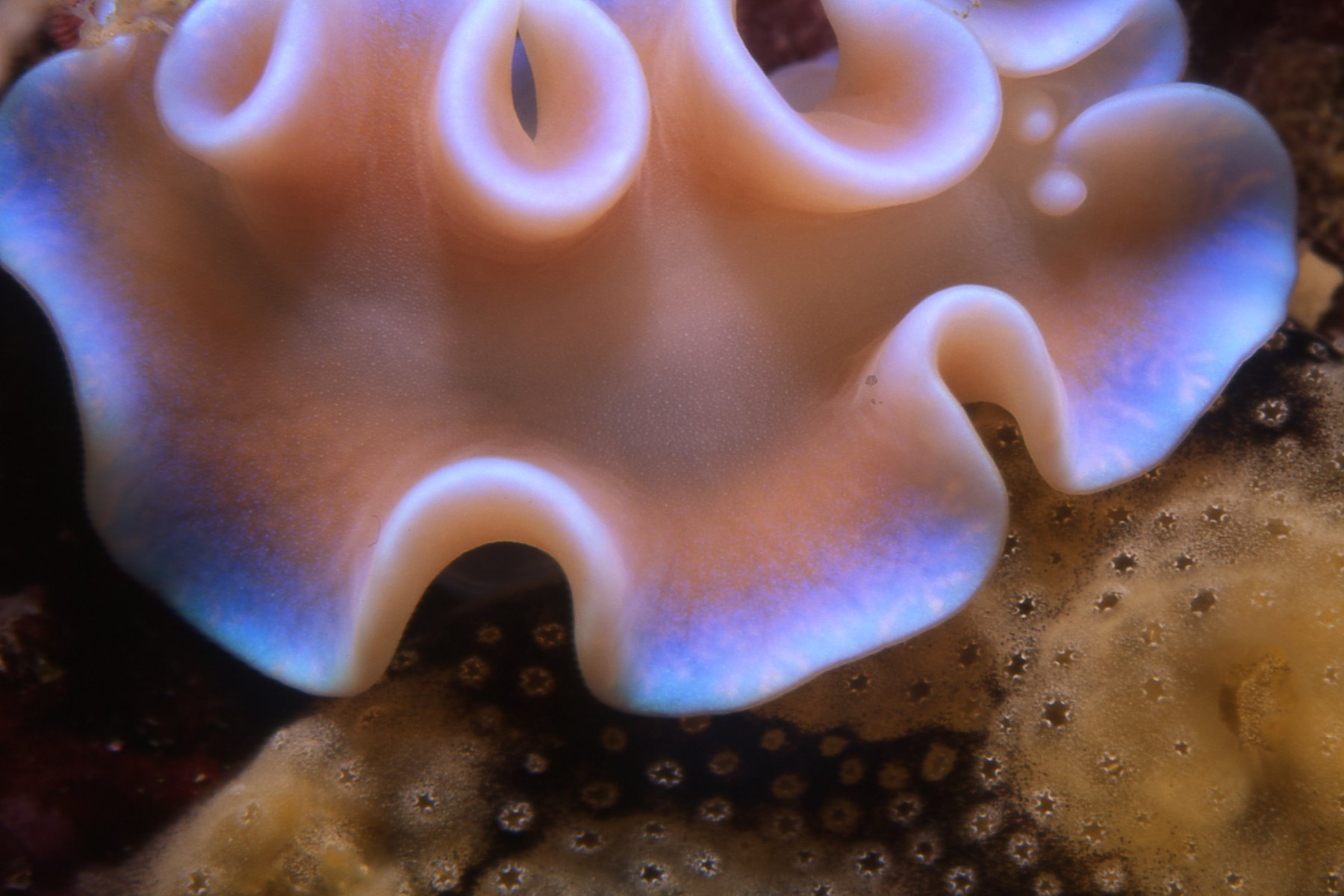
Close-up of the mantle showing the branching digestive system in the mantle margin

== Ecology ==
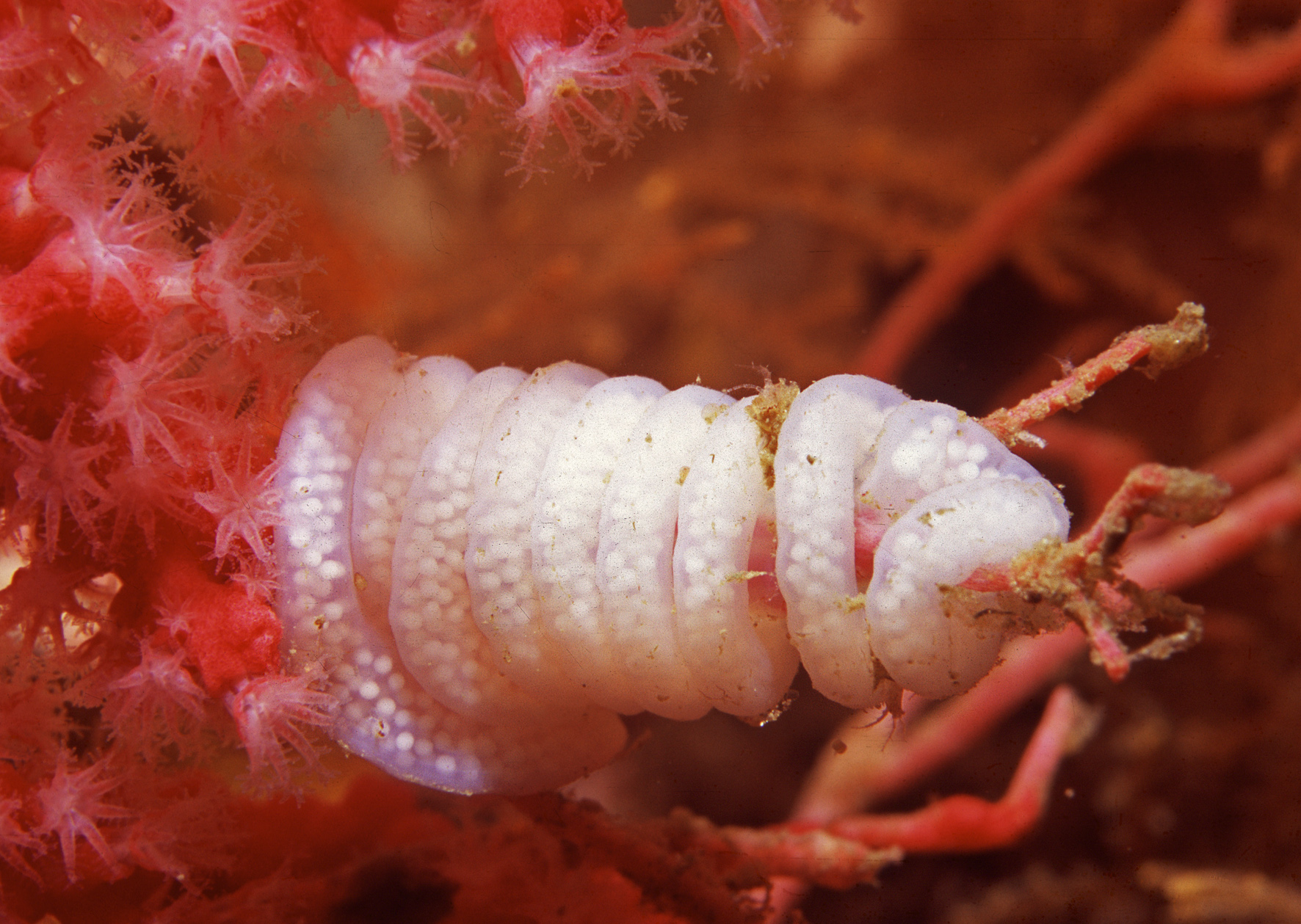
Egg ribbon

The egg mass of Leminda millecra consists of fat white convoluted curls with large eggs distinctly visible.

It is reported to feed on the soft coral Alcyonium fauri.

== Etymology ==
The genus name comes from an adaptation of the describing author's daughter's name.
