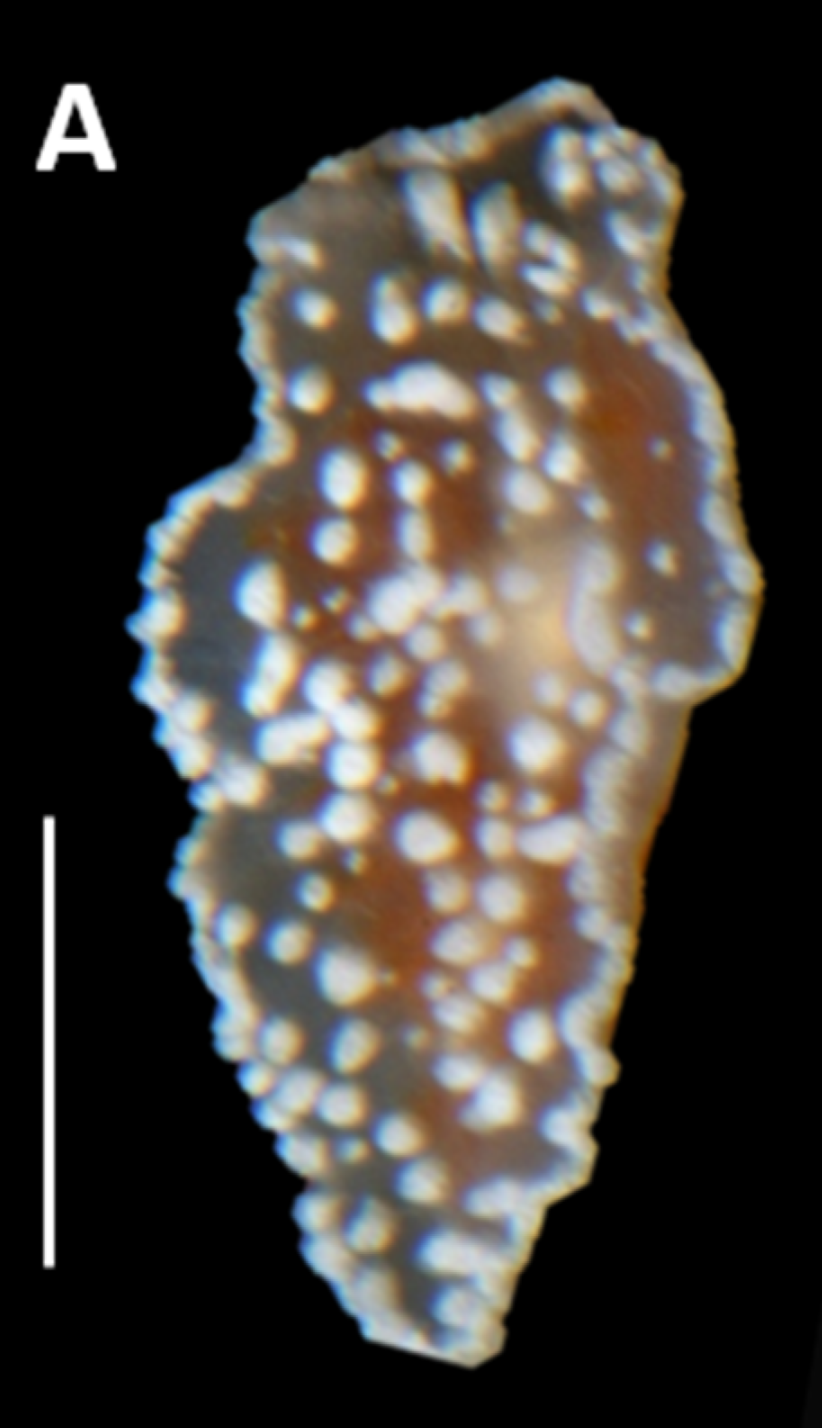
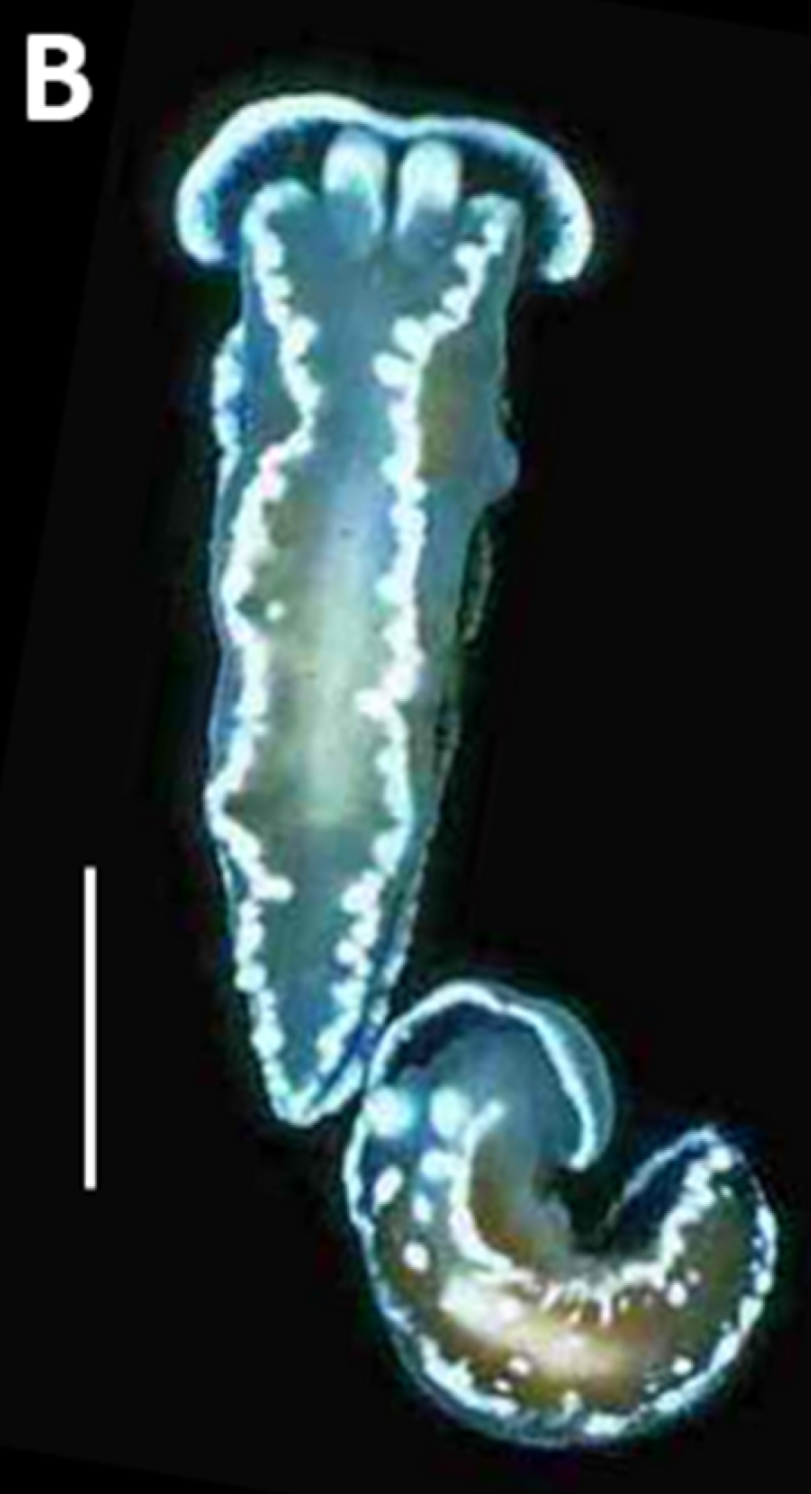
- Specimens of Curnon granulosa (left), and Pseudotritonia quadrangularis (right)

Scientific classification
- Kingdom: Animalia
- Phylum: Mollusca
- Class: Gastropoda
- Order: Nudibranchia
- Suborder: Janolacea
- Superfamily: Proctonotoidea
- Family: Curnonidae d'Udekem d'Acoz, 2017

Genera
- See text

Synonyms
- Charcotiidae Odhner, 1926 (type genus is a junior homonym)

= Curnonidae =

Family of gastropods

Curnonidae is a family of nudibranchs, shell-less marine gastropod molluscs or sea slugs, in the superfamily Proctonotoidea.

== Description ==
The Curnonidae are a small family of nudibranchs with representatives in the Southern Ocean including South Africa.

== Etymology ==
The genus name was originally a tribute to Dr. Jean Charcot, who led the expedition which discovered this species.

== Genera ==
The following genera are recognised in the family Curnonidae:

- Curnon d'Udekem d'Acoz, 2017 [= Charcotia Vayssière, 1906 (junior homonym)]
- Pseudotritonia Thiele, 1912 [= Telarma Odhner, 1934]
