= Sund Rock =

Conservation area on Hood Canal, Washington, USA

Sund Rock is a designated conservation area on the U.S. state of Washington's Hood Canal. The area is known for abundant and diverse life, including but not limited to Lingcod, Giant Pacific Octopus, Wolf Eel, as well as nudibranch, anemone, and sea cucumber.

The area is well known to regional scuba divers, especially for its two major walls, known colloquially as the north and south walls. These walls have depths 70 to 80 feet (21 to 24 m), depending upon the tide. Several other walls exist, some going down beyond 100 feet (30 m) in depth. One of these is called "fish pen wall." Additional features include the "fish bowl"—a reef-like area full of life—a large sunken boat just to the north of the north wall, and a small wrecked boat between the north and south walls.

Recreational and technical divers alike find Sund Rock attractive for various reasons. Recreational divers appreciate Sund Rock because it is not a current-sensitive area, the main walls are easily within recreational dive limits, and for abundant sea life. Technical divers enjoy the deeper walls and other areas that allow them to dive well beyond recreational limits.

Because Sund Rock is a conservation area, no hunting or gathering of any kind is permitted. Two ways exist of entering the waters in the area. One option involves a somewhat steep but short hike and surface swim of 250 to 600 metres (820 to 1,970 ft). An alternative method is to access a private beach nearby.

The boundaries of the area are

description	coordinate
nw corner	47.44°N 123.11834°W
ne corner	47.44°N 123.115°W
se corner	47.43333°N 123.11501°W
sw corner	47.43333°N 123.12245°W
rough center	47.4366°N 123.1174°W
