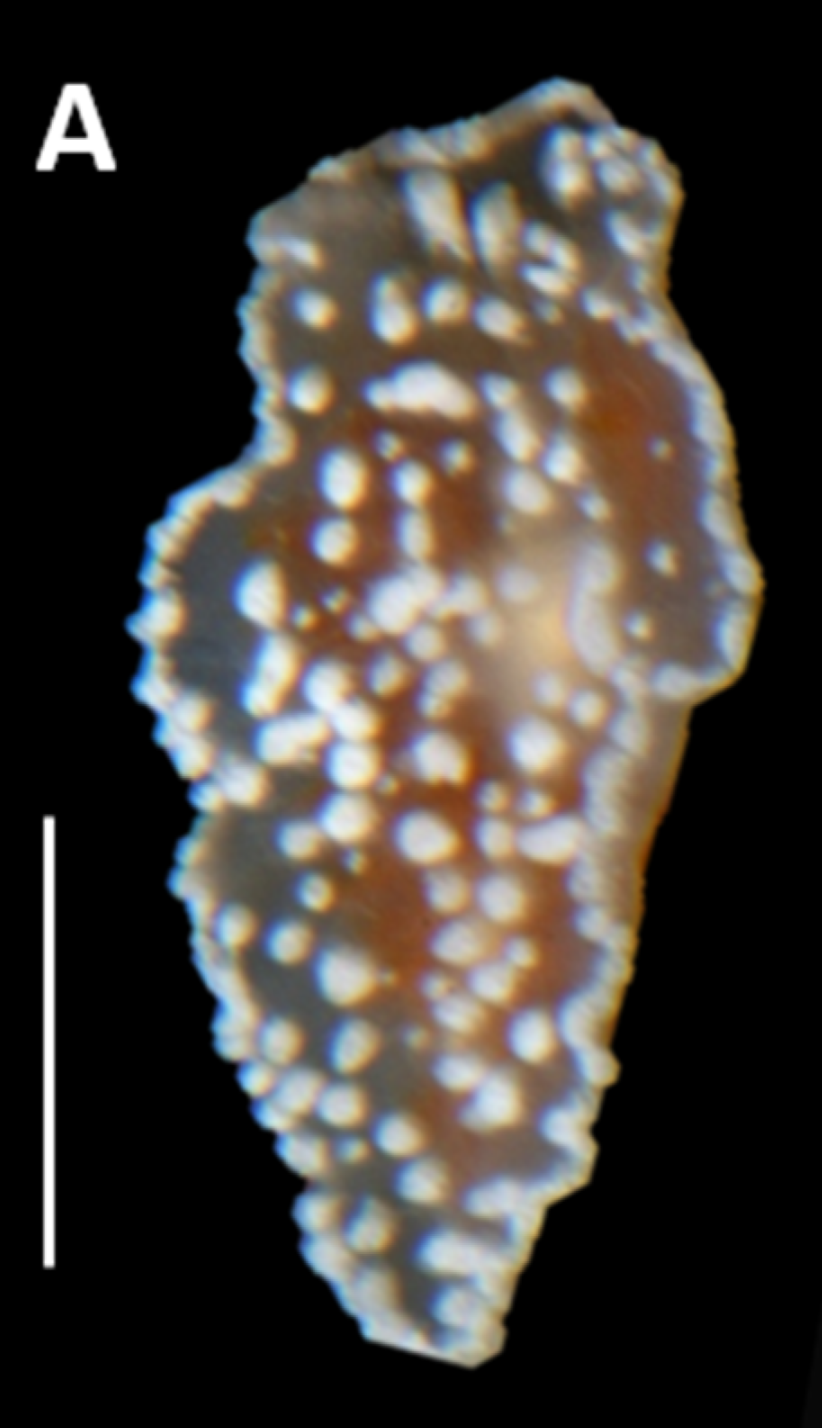
- Specimen of Curnon granulosa from King George Island

Scientific classification
- Kingdom: Animalia
- Phylum: Mollusca
- Class: Gastropoda
- Order: Nudibranchia
- Suborder: Cladobranchia
- Family: Curnonidae
- Genus: Curnon d'Udekem d'Acoz, 2017
- Species: C. granulosa

Binomial name
- Curnon granulosa (Vayssière, 1906)

Synonyms
- Charcotia granulosa Vayssière, 1906 (original combination)

= Curnon =

Genus of gastropods

Curnon granulosa is a species of sea slug, a nudibranch, a marine gastropod mollusc in the family Curnonidae. It is the only species in the genus Curnon.

== Etymology ==
The genus name was originally a tribute to Dr. Jean Charcot, who led the expedition which discovered this species.

== Distribution ==
This species was described from a single specimen found at 40 m depth at Booth Island, Antarctica. It has been described in more detail from specimens collected at Signy Island, Antarctica.

== Description ==
The body of Curnon granulosa is translucent white with branches of the pink digestive gland showing through the skin. The mantle is bordered by an opaque white band and the dorsal surface is covered by pointed tubercles which are tipped with white pigment. The rhinophores are translucent and tipped with white.
