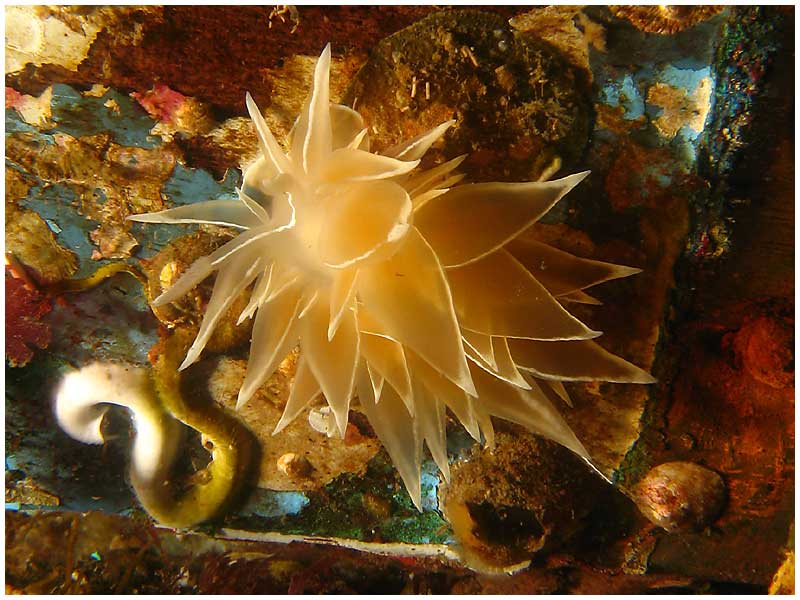
- Dirona albolineata

Scientific classification
- Kingdom: Animalia
- Phylum: Mollusca
- Class: Gastropoda
- Order: Nudibranchia
- Suborder: Cladobranchia
- Superfamily: Proctonotoidea
- Family: Dironidae; Eliot, 1910

Species
- See text

= Dironidae =

Family of gastropods

Dironidae is a family of nudibranchs, marine gastropod molluscs, in the clade Euthyneura. There are no subfamilies in Dironidae.

== Genera ==
- Dirona MacFarland, in Cockerell & Eliot, 1905 - type genus
