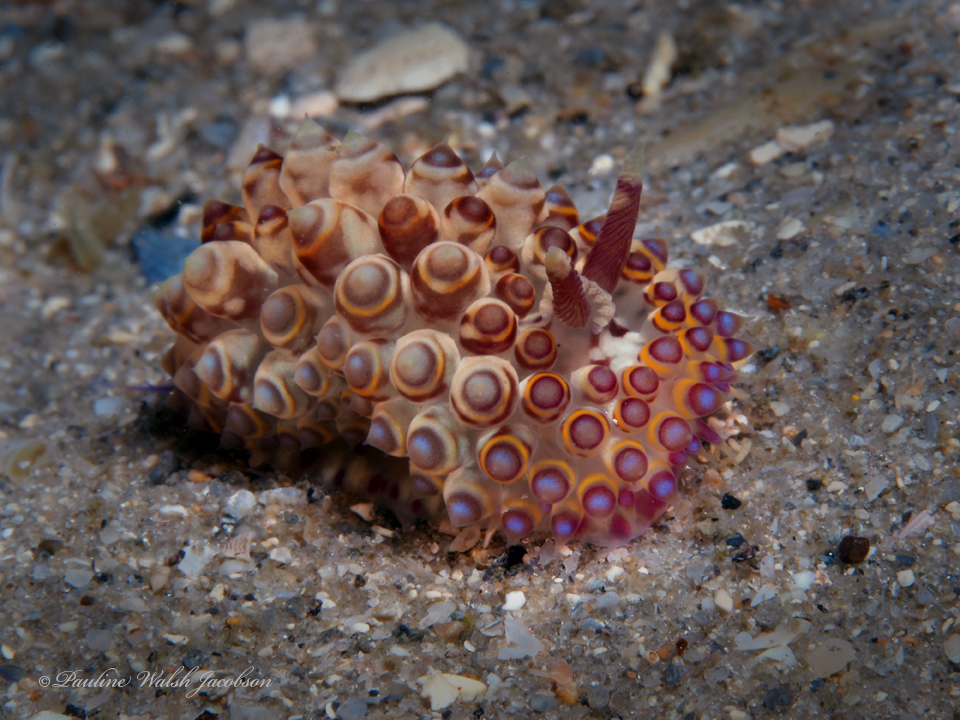
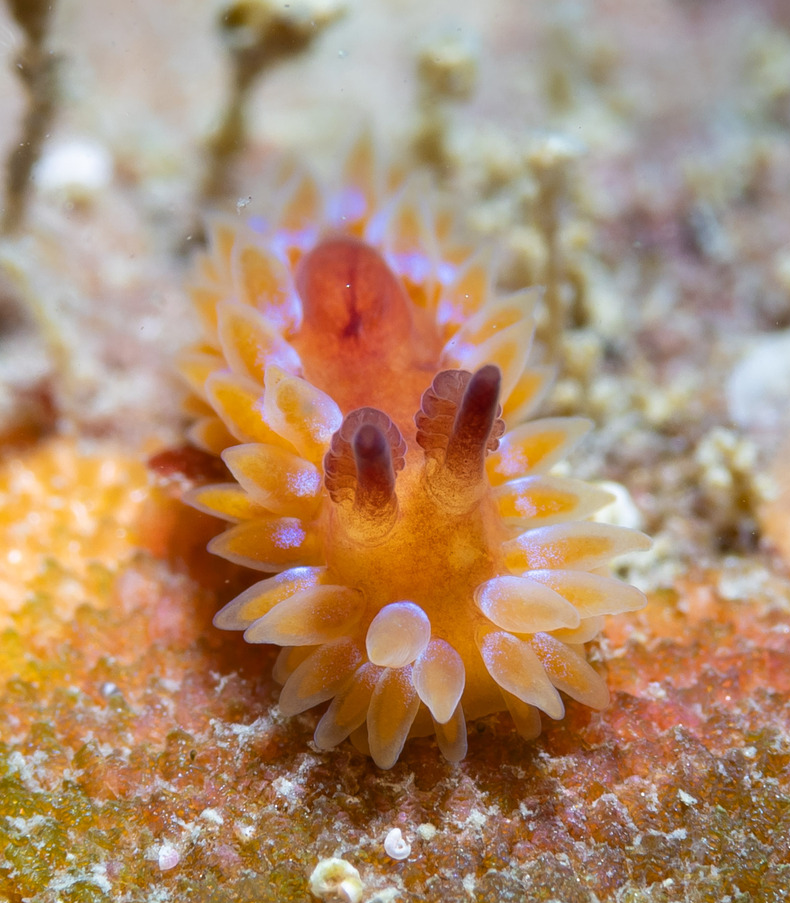
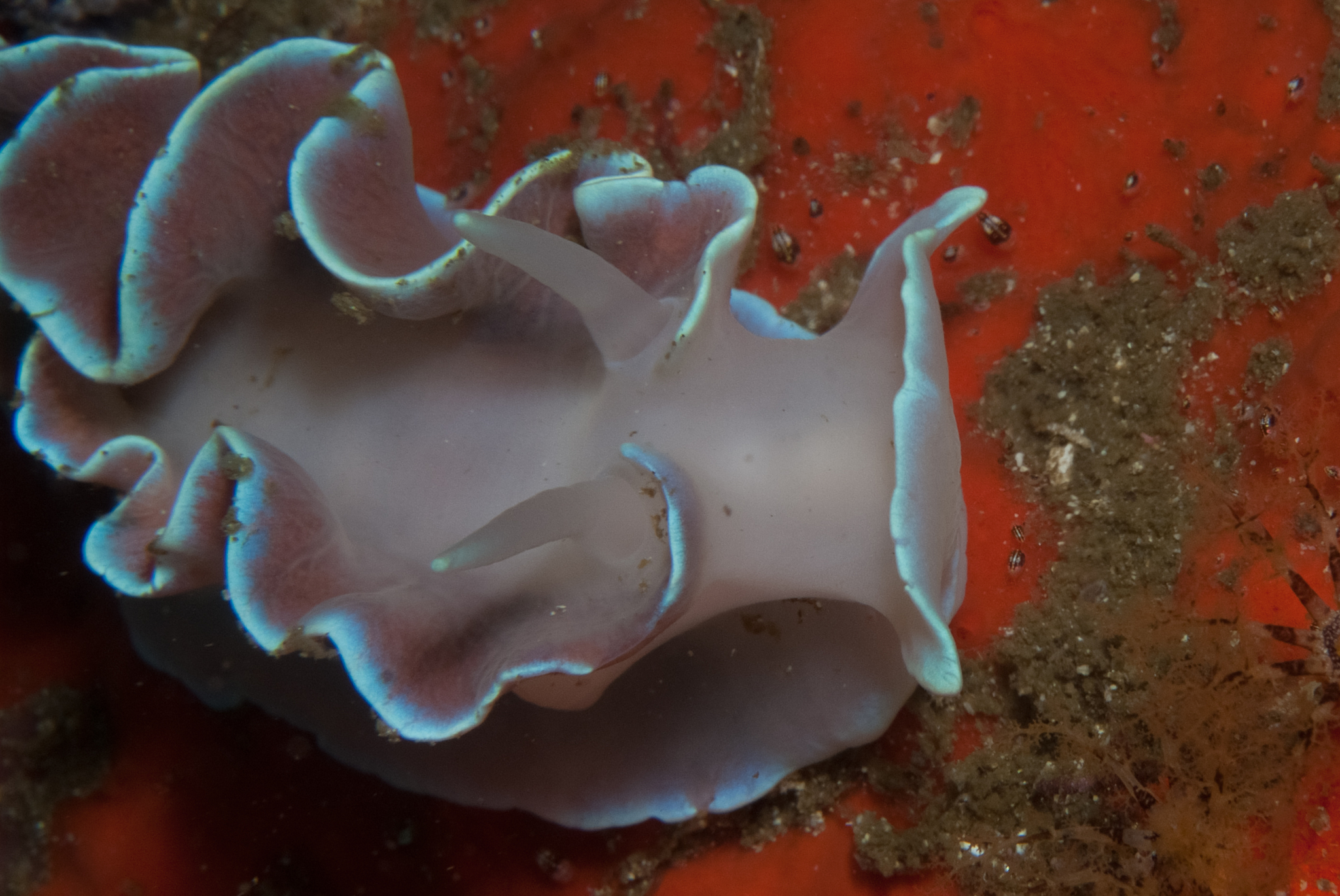
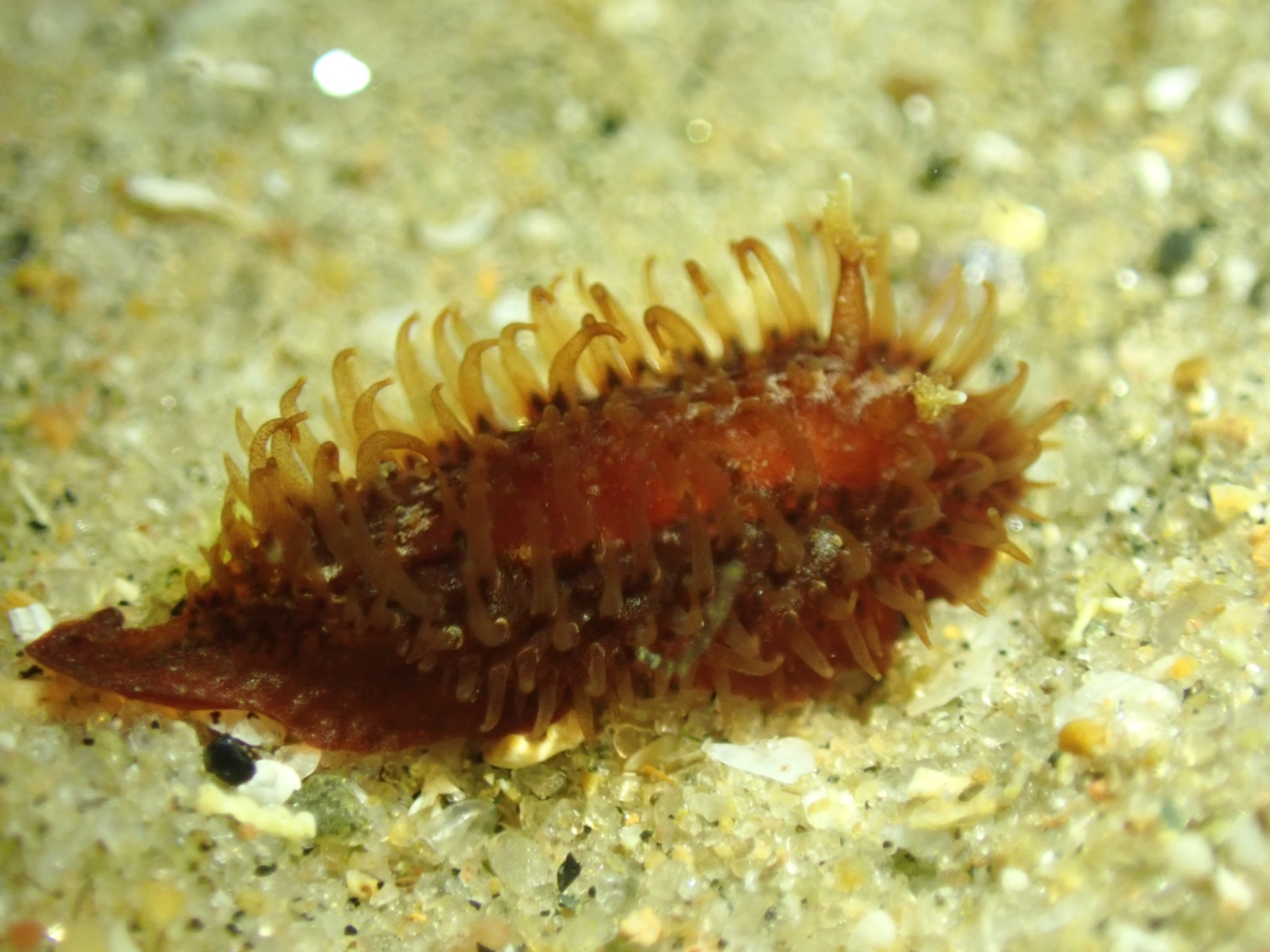
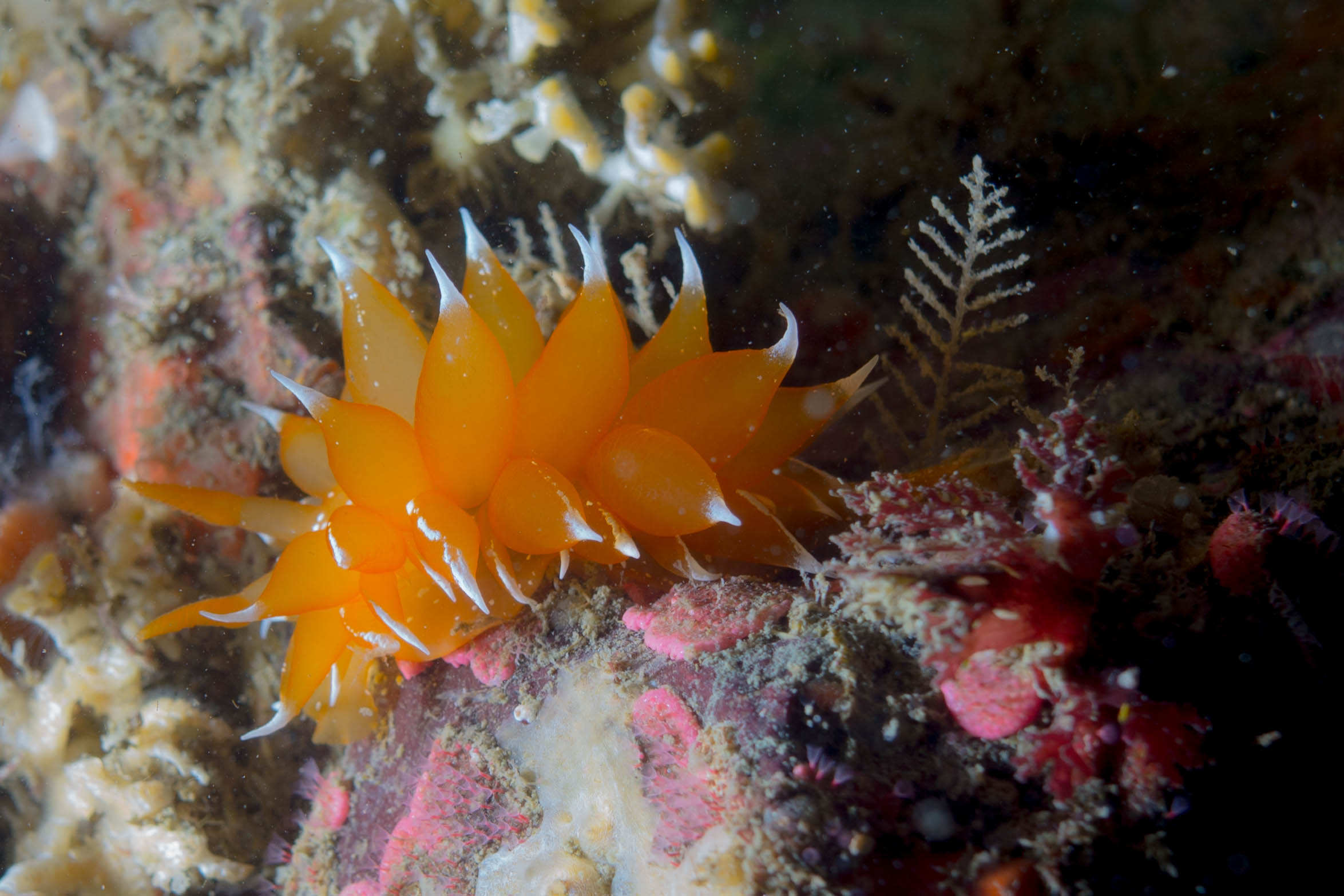
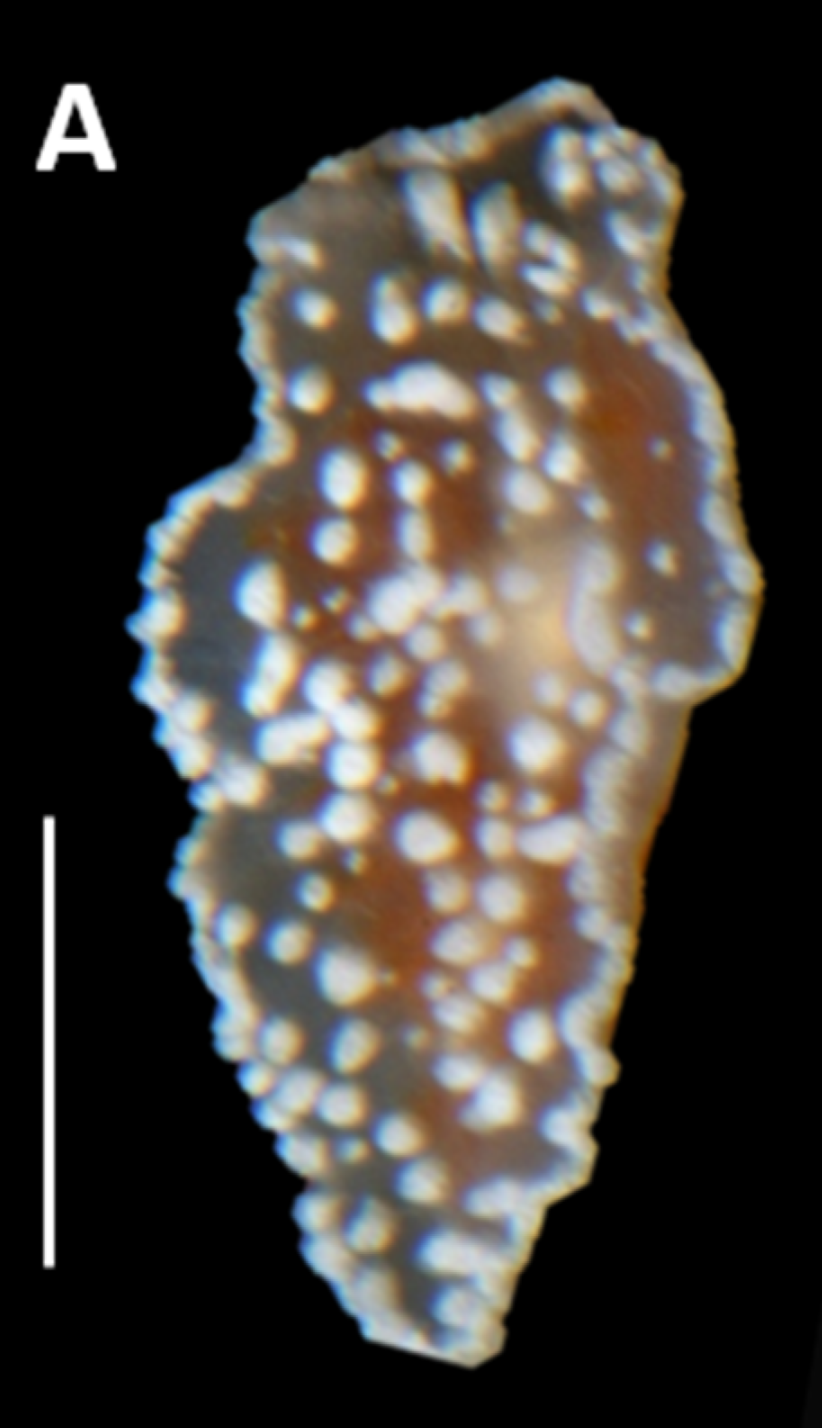
- From left to right in each row, top to bottom: Janolus flavoanulatus (Janolidae), Caldukia rubiginosa (Proctonotidae), Leminda millecra (Lemindidae), Madrella ferruginosa (Madrellidae), Dirona pellucida (Dironidae), Curnon granulosa (Curnonidae)

Scientific classification
- Kingdom: Animalia
- Phylum: Mollusca
- Class: Gastropoda
- Order: Nudibranchia
- Suborder: Janolacea; Minichev & Starobogatov, 1979
- Superfamily: Proctonotoidea; J. E. Gray, 1853

Families
- See text

= Proctonotoidea =

Superfamily of gastropods

Proctonotoidea is a superfamily of nudibranchs, shell-less marine gastropod molluscs or sea slugs, and the only member of the suborder Janolacea.

== Families ==
The following families are recognised in the superfamily Proctonotoidea:

- Family Curnonidae d’Udekem d’Acoz, 2017
- Family Lemindidae Griffiths, 1985
- Family Dironidae Eliot, 1910
- Family Madrellidae Preston, 1911
- Family Proctonotidae Gray, 1853
- Family Janolidae Pruvot-Fol, 1933
- Family ?Goniaeolididae Odhner, 1907
