= The Very Best of Jean-Luc Ponty =

Greatest hits album by Jean-Luc Ponty
- Released: June 20, 2000
- Recorded: January 1975–August 1985
- Genre: Jazz fusion
- Label: Rhino
- Producer: Jean-Luc Ponty

Jean-Luc Ponty chronology
| Le Voyage: The Jean-Luc Ponty Anthology (1996) | The Very Best of Jean-Luc Ponty (2000) | The Best of the Pacific Jazz Years (2001) |

Professional ratings
Review scores
| Source | Rating |
|---|---|
| Allmusic | 4/5 stars |

The Very Best of Jean-Luc Ponty is a compilation album by French jazz fusion artist Jean-Luc Ponty, released in 2000. It mainly focuses on his work while on the Atlantic label.

== Track listing ==
All songs by Jean-Luc Ponty.

1. "Bowing-Bowing" – 4:53
2. "Aurora, Pt. 2" – 6:15
3. "Renaissance" – 5:48
4. "New Country" – 3:10
5. "Enigmatic Ocean, Pt. 3" – 3:37
6. "Mirage" – 4:54
7. "Egocentric Molecules" – 5:49
8. "Cosmic Messenger" – 4:41
9. "I Only Feel Good With You" – 3:18
10. "No Strings Attached" (live) – 6:02
11. "A Taste for Passion" – 5:25
12. "Forms of Life" – 4:50
13. "Rhythms of Hope" – 4:03
14. "Final Truth, Pt. 1" – 4:54
15. "Individual Choice" – 4:56
16. "Infinite Pursuit" – 5:59

== Personnel ==
- Jean-Luc Ponty – violin, autoharp, keyboards, electronic percussion, violectra
- Chris Rhyne – synthesizer, piano, synthesizer bass
- Patrice Rushen – organ, synthesizer, piano, clavichord, clavinet
- Allan Zavod – keyboards, clavinet
- Jamie Glaser – guitar
- Scott Henderson – guitar
- Allan Holdsworth – guitar
- Joaquin Lievano – guitar, guitar synth
- Peter Maunu – guitar, guitar synth
- Dan Sawyer – guitar
- Daryl Stuermer – guitar
- Ralphe Armstrong – bass
- Baron Browne – bass
- Tom Fowler – bass
- Randy Jackson – bass
- Leon "Ndugu" Chancler – drums, percussion
- Mark Craney – drums, percussion
- Rayford Griffin – drums, percussion
- Norman Fearrington – drums, percussion
- Casey Scheuerell – drums, percussion
- Steve Smith – drums, percussion
- Paulinho Da Costa – percussion
