= Better Late Than Never (Anderson Ponty Band album) =

Live album by Anderson Ponty Band (Jon Anderson & Jean-Luc Ponty)
- Released: 25 September 2015
- Recorded: 20 September 2014
- Venue: Wheeler Opera House, Aspen, Colorado, United States
- Genre: Progressive rock
- Length: 60.57 (CD) + 65 min (DVD)
- Label: Liaison Records / earMUSIC Verycords

Anderson Ponty Band (Jon Anderson & Jean-Luc Ponty) chronology
The Living Tree in Concert Part One (2011)	Better Late Than Never (2015)	Invention of Knowledge (2016)

Better Late Than Never is a live album by the Anderson Ponty Band, released in September 2015.

== Overview ==
The Anderson Ponty Band is a progressive rock band formed in summer 2014, centred around the French violinist Jean-Luc Ponty and the British singer/songwriter and founding member of Yes, Jon Anderson.

Ponty was approached by Jon Anderson with the idea of working together in the 1980s, but the idea did not come to fruition until about 30 years later when the project was put up on Kickstarter and was successfully funded by August 2014.

Better Late Than Never was largely recorded during the band's debut concert on 20 September 2014 at the Wheeler Opera House in Aspen, Colorado, but the released recording also includes studio embellishments and overdubs. It presents new musical compositions, rearrangements of classic Yes hits such as "Owner of a Lonely Heart", "Roundabout" and "Wonderous Stories", as well as Ponty compositions with lyrics written by Anderson such as "Infinite Mirage" (based on Enigmatic Ocean's "Mirage") and "Listening with Me" (based on A Taste for Passion's "Stay with Me").

The band's original line-up, which played at Aspen, included the bass guitarist Baron Browne, the drummer Rayford Griffin, the keyboardist Wally Minko and the guitarist Jamie Dunlap. By January 2015, Dunlap had left the band and Ponty's guitarist, Jamie Glaser, subsequently overdubbed all of Dunlap's original parts for the album.

== Releases ==
Better Late Than Never is a double disc Digipak including the 14-track audio CD, an hour-long 10-song performance bonus DVD (including artist interviews) and a 20-page booklet with complete song lyrics.

A videography documenting the making of Better Late Than Never was due to be released along with videos and performances.

== Tours ==
In support of the new release, a North America tour named the "Better Late Than Never" tour was scheduled: a 17-date autumn 2015 leg began on 23 October 2015 in Stroudsburg, Pennsylvania, and ended on 21 November 2015 in Scottsdale, Arizona. An 18-date spring 2016 leg followed, from 28 April 2016 in Tucson, Arizona, to 27 May 2016 in Québec City.

== Track listing ==
No.	Title	Length
1.	"Intro"	1:17
2.	"One in the Rhythm of Hope"	4:34
3.	"A for Aria"	3:22
4.	"Owner of a Lonely Heart"	5:04
5.	"Listening with Me"	5:39
6.	"Time and a Word"	5:30
7.	"Infinite Mirage"	3:48
8.	"Soul Eternal"	4:58
9.	"Wonderous Stories"	4:01
10.	"And You and I"	3:00
11.	"Renaissance of the Sun"	6:36
12.	"Roundabout"	5:27
13.	"I See You Messenger"	3:50
14.	"New New World"	3:46

Bonus DVD
No.	Title	Length
1.	"Intro"
2.	"One in the Rhythm of Hope"
3.	"A for Aria"
4.	"Owner of a Lonely Heart"
5.	"Listening with Me"
6.	"Time and a Word"
7.	"Infinite Mirage"
8.	"Soul Eternal"
9.	"Wonderous Stories"
10.	"Renaissance of the Sun"
11.	"Roundabout"

== Personnel ==
- Jon Anderson – lead vocals, acoustic guitars
- Jean-Luc Ponty – violin
- Jamie Glaser – guitars (Jamie Dunlap was part of the original line-up of APB and thus performed live on 20 September 2014 at the Wheeler Opera House, Aspen, Colorado, but, by January 2015, he had left the band and had been replaced by Ponty's guitarist Jamie Glaser who, as a result, overdubbed all Dunlap's parts on the present live album)
- Wally Minko – keyboards, piano
- Baron Browne – bass guitar
- Rayford Griffin – drums and percussion

== Complete setlist of the show in Aspen ==
The album tracks are in bold.

Part 1:

- "**Intro**" →
- "**One In The Rhythm of Hope**" (2015)
- "**A for Aria**" (2015)
- "Yours Is No Disgrace" (1971/not yet published)
- "**Listening With Me**" (2015)
- "**Time and A Word**" (1970/2015)
- "Jig" (not yet published)
- "**Infinite Mirage**" (2015)
- "**Soul Eternal**" (2015)
- "**I See You Messenger**" (2015)
- "**Owner of a Lonely Heart**" (1983/2015)

Part 2:

- "New Country" (1976/not yet published)
- "**Wonderous Stories**" (1977/2015)
- "Long Distance Runaround" (1971/not yet published)
- "**Renaissance of the Sun**" (1976/2015)
- "Enigmatic Ocean Parts 1 & 2" (incl. drums solo) (1977/not yet published)
- "**New New World**" (2015)
- "**And You and I**" (1972/2015)
- "Starship Trooper" (1971/not yet published)
- "Bass solo" (not yet published) →
- "**Roundabout**" (1971/2015)
