= The Best of Jean-Luc Ponty =

Greatest hits album by Jean-Luc Ponty
- Released: March 12, 2002
- Recorded: May 11, 1987–March 27, 1991
- Genre: Jazz fusion
- Label: Columbia
- Producer: Jean-Luc Ponty

Jean-Luc Ponty chronology
Life Enigma (2001)	The Best of Jean-Luc Ponty (2002)	Live at Semper Opera (2002)

Professional ratings
Review scores
Source	Rating
Allmusic	3/5 stars

The Best of Jean-Luc Ponty is a compilation album by French jazz fusion artist Jean-Luc Ponty, released in 2002. It focuses on his work while on the Columbia label.

== Track listing ==
All songs by Jean-Luc Ponty unless otherwise noted.

1. "Prologue" – 1:03
2. "Faith in You" – 4:52
3. "Tchokola" (Brice Wassy) – 5:48
4. "Spring Episode" – 5:52
5. "Metamorphosis" – 5:53
6. "Tender Memories" – 5:20
7. "Mouna Bowa" (Ponty, Guy N'Sangue) – 6:33
8. "In the Fast Lane" – 4:10
9. "The Gift of Time" – 5:06
10. "After the Storm" – 4:21
11. "Bottle Bop" (Yves N'Djock, Nsangue, Wassy) – 4:52
12. "Prelude No. 20, Op. 28" (Chopin) – 2:59

== Personnel ==
- Jean-Luc Ponty – violin, synthesizer, Synclavier, keyboards
- Rayford Griffin – drums, percussion
- Baron Browne – bass
- Jamie Glaser – guitar
- Pat Thomi – guitar
- Wally Mino – piano, keyboards
- Clara Ponty – piano
- Patrice Rushen – synthesizer
- Grover Washington Jr. – synthesizer, soprano saxophone
- Kurt Wortman – percussion
- Martin Atangana – guitar
- Yves N'Djock – guitar
- Guy N'Sangue – bass
- Brice Wassy – drums, percussion
- Moustapha Cisse – percussion
- Angélique Kidjo – vocals
- Myriam Betty – vocals
- Kémo Kouyaté – harp, background vocals, Balafon, Kora
- Abdou M'Boup – percussion, bongos, vocals, Sabar, Tama, Bugarabu
- Willy N'For – vocals
