= Fables (Jean-Luc Ponty album) =

Studio album by Jean-Luc Ponty
- Released: September 23, 1985
- Recorded: July–August 1985
- Studios: La Tour d'Ivoire (Los Angeles, California); Bill Schnee (North Hollywood, California); Cherokee (Hollywood, California); Ocean Way Recording (Los Angeles, California); The Village Recorder (West Los Angeles, California)
- Genre: Jazz fusion
- Length: 35:12
- Label: Atlantic
- Producer: Jean-Luc Ponty

Jean-Luc Ponty chronology
Open Mind (1984)	Fables (1985)	The Gift of Time (1987)

Fables is an album by French jazz fusion artist Jean-Luc Ponty, released in 1985.

== Background ==
Guitarist Scott Henderson joined Ponty's band for Fables after Allan Holdsworth, who had toured and recorded with Ponty on Enigmatic Ocean and Individual Choice between 1977 and 1983, left the group. According to Henderson, Holdsworth had heard him performing with bassist Jeff Berlin's band, which had opened for Holdsworth's own group, and recommended him to Ponty sight unseen. Henderson's inclusion on Fables, alongside bassist Baron Browne and drummer Rayford Griffin, gave Ponty a full rhythm section in the studio; as AllMusic's Richard S. Ginell later put it, Ponty was "lonely for some company in the studio" and brought in the trio to accompany his violins, keyboards and sequencers.

== Reception ==
Professional ratings
Review scores
Source	Rating
AllMusic	3/5 stars

AllMusic's Richard S. Ginell noted that "Ponty's sound has opened up considerably", but that he "continues to explore the high-tech, electronic, sequenced ostinato world that he opened the door to on Individual Choice" and that the album is "very even... without any extreme peaks or dips".

Fables is one of several of Ponty's albums that has been acknowledged as an influence on Detroit techno artists. In 2014, DJ Rolando cited it as his favourite album.

== Track listing ==
All songs by Jean-Luc Ponty. Adapted from liner notes.

No.	Title	Length
1.	"Infinite Pursuit"	5:58
2.	"Elephants in Love"	5:21
3.	"Radioactive Legacy"	6:16
4.	"Cats Tales"	4:54
5.	"Perpetual Rondo"	4:42
6.	"In the Kingdom of Peace"	4:03
7.	"Plastic Idols"	3:58
Total length:		35:12

== Personnel ==
- Jean-Luc Ponty – Zeta & Barcus-Berry electric violins, Prophet-5 & Synclavier synthesizers, electronic percussion, vocals
- Scott Henderson – electric guitar (tracks 1–5)
- Baron Browne – electric bass (tracks 1–5)
- Rayford Griffin – drums, percussion (tracks 1–5)

Production

- Jean-Luc Ponty – producer
- David Ahlert – engineer
- David Eaton – engineer
- Dan Garcia – engineer
- Cliff Jones – engineer
- Peter R. Kelsey – engineer

== Charts ==
Year	Chart	Position
1985	Billboard Jazz Albums	9
1985	Billboard 200	166
