= Live at Chene Park =

Live at Aretha Franklin Park

Live album by Jean-Luc Ponty
- Released: October 23, 1996
- Recorded: June 29, 1996
- Venue: Chene Park (Detroit)
- Genre: Jazz fusion
- Length: 70:56
- Label: Atlantic
- Producer: Ralph Simon, Joe Barbaria

Jean-Luc Ponty chronology
Le Voyage: The Jean-Luc Ponty Anthology (1996)	Live at Aretha Franklin Park (1996)	The Very Best of Jean-Luc Ponty (2000)

Professional ratings
Review scores
Source	Rating
Allmusic	3/5 stars

Live at Chene Park is a live album by French jazz fusion artist Jean-Luc Ponty, released in 1996.

== Track listing ==
All songs by Jean-Luc Ponty.

1. "Introduction" – 0:48
2. "Infinite Pursuit" – 7:47
3. "Tender Memories" – 7:12
4. "Between Sea and Sky" – 5:50
5. "Caracas" – 6:36
6. "Faith in You" – 5:14
7. "After the Storm" – 7:08
8. "The Gift of Time" – 6:05
9. "Eulogy for Oscar Romero" – 2:53
10. "The Amazon Forest" – 4:21
11. "The Story Teller" – 4:28
12. "Elephants in Love" – 5:31
13. "A Journey's End" – 5:56

== Personnel ==
- Jean-Luc Ponty – violin
- Jamie Glaser – guitar
- Chris Rhyne – piano, keyboards
- Baron Browne – bass guitar
- Michael Barsimanto – drums

== Charts ==
Chart (1997)	Peak position
US Top Contemporary Jazz Albums (Billboard)	15
