= The Atacama Experience =

Studio album by Jean-Luc Ponty
- Released: May 8, 2007
- Genres: Jazz fusion, world fusion
- Label: Koch
- Producer: Jean-Luc Ponty

Jean-Luc Ponty chronology
Jean-Luc Ponty in Concert (2003)	The Atacama Experience (2007)	D-Stringz with Stanley Clarke, Bireli Lagrene (2015)

The Atacama Experience is an album by French violinist Jean-Luc Ponty, released in 2007. It reached number 24 on the Billboard Top Jazz Albums chart, Ponty's first charting album since Live at Chene Park in 1996. It is his first studio album in six years since Life Enigma. The album personnel consists of Ponty's regular touring band with guest appearances by guitarists Allan Holdsworth (on track 4) and Philip Catherine (on tracks 2, 5 and 12). The title refers to the Atacama Desert on the Pacific coast of Chile. In the first edition of the album the name "Acatama" was used by mistake.

== Critical reception ==
Professional ratings
Review scores
Source	Rating
All About Jazz	4/5 stars
AllMusic	4/5 stars

Critical reception for The Atacama Experience was generally favorable. Michael G. Nastos states in his AllMusic review, "Considering Ponty's most recent work...this recording is not only a welcome change of pace, but a return to the great music that made Ponty an important figure in contemporary music. This one is recommended with no hesitation, and is the brilliant violinist's best effort in nearly 30 years." In his All About Jazz review, John Kelman called it "...a welcome return to form. Thoroughly engaging, it possesses the enduring compositional depth and unmistakable solo acumen that's kept Ponty's name alive, even during years when he's been away from the public eye." Jesse Hamlin of SFGate stated that Ponty "sounds sensational" on the album, describing it as "a sort of musical travelogue featuring music partly inspired by his trips to India, Ireland and the vast Atacama desert of northern Chile."

== Track listing ==
All songs by Jean-Luc Ponty unless otherwise noted.

1. "Intro" – 0:15
2. "Parisian Thoroughfare" (Bud Powell) – 4:39
3. "Premonition" – 3:43
4. "Point of No Return" – 6:45
5. "Back in the 60's" – 4:03
6. "Without Regrets" – 4:29
7. "Celtic Steps" – 5:52
8. "Desert Crossing" – 3:03
9. "Last Memories of Her" – 5:21
10. "The Atacama Experience" – 2:01
11. "On My Way to Bombay" – 4:32
12. "Still in Love" – 5:07
13. "Euphoria" (William Lecomte) – 4:49
14. "To and Fro" – 4:21

== Personnel ==
- Jean-Luc Ponty – violin, keyboards, synthesizer, effects
- William Lecomte – piano, keyboards
- Philip Catherine – guitar (tracks 2, 5 and 12)
- Allan Holdsworth – guitar (track 4)
- Guy N'Sangue – bass guitar
- Thierry Arpino – drums
- Taffa Cissé – percussion

Production

- Jean-Luc Ponty – producer, engineer
- Greg Calbi – mastering
- Karim Sai – engineer, mixing
- David Wilkes – A&R
- Claudia Ponty – cover photo
- Kimberly Wright – photography
- Frederic Houis – photography
- Jacky Lepage – photography

Year	Chart	Position
2007	Billboard Top Jazz Albums	24
