= Live (Jean-Luc Ponty album) =

Live album by Jean-Luc Ponty
- Released: April 18, 1979
- Recorded: December 1978
- Genre: Jazz fusion
- Length: 39:59
- Label: Atlantic
- Producer: Jean-Luc Ponty

Jean-Luc Ponty chronology
Cosmic Messenger (1978)	Live (1979)	A Taste for Passion (1979)

Professional ratings
Review scores
Source	Rating
AllMusic	4/5 stars
The Rolling Stone Jazz Record Guide	4/5 stars

Live is a live album by French jazz fusion artist Jean-Luc Ponty, recorded in December 1978 and released on April 18, 1979. It was reissued on Atlantic Records on CD in 1990 and 1992.

== Critical reception ==
Ace Adams of the New York Daily News called Live "a dazzling musical of fireworks and technical brilliance and it shows him as the wizard of the violin. This is one of the best European jazz albums today."

== Track listing ==
No.	Title	Writer(s)	Length
1.	"Aurora, Pt. 1"	Jean-Luc Ponty	2:53
2.	"Aurora, Pt. 2"	Jean-Luc Ponty	6:18
3.	"Imaginary Voyage, Pt. 3"	Jean-Luc Ponty	4:25
4.	"Imaginary Voyage, Pt. 4"	Jean-Luc Ponty	7:09
5.	"Mirage"	Jean-Luc Ponty	5:46
6.	"No Strings Attached"		5:59
7.	"Egocentric Molecules"		7:26

== Personnel ==
- Jean-Luc Ponty – violin, piano, keyboards
- Allan Zavod – electric piano, keyboards, synthesizers
- Jamie Glaser – electric guitar
- Joaquin Lievano – electric guitar
- Ralphe Armstrong – fretless bass, bass
- Casey Scheuerell – drums, percussion

== Production ==
- Assistant engineers (Chateau Recorders): Brian Leshon, Russ Bracher
- Assistant engineers (Record Plant Mobile): Jimmy Sandweiss, Mark Eshelman, Walter Borchers
- Assistant engineers (Wally Heider Mobile): Billy Youdelman, Dennis Mays, Doug Field, Gray O'Dell, Les Cooper, Mike Carver, Phil McConnell, Walter Dawes
- Mastered by Stan Ricker

Recorded live in December 1978 during a concert tour in the U.S. with the Wally Heider Mobile Studio and the Record Plant Mobile Studio, both from Los Angeles, California.
Mixed at Chateau Recorders, North Hollywood, California.
Mastered at JVC Cutting Center, Hollywood, California.

== Chart positions ==
Year	Chart	Position
1979	Billboard Jazz Albums	8
1979	Billboard Pop Albums	68
