= Live at Donte's (Jean-Luc Ponty album) =

Live album by Jean-Luc Ponty
- Released: 1981
- Recorded: March 12–13, 1969
- Venues: Donte's, North Hollywood, California
- Genre: Jazz
- Length: 38:43
- Label: Blue Note
- Producer: Richard Bock

Jean-Luc Ponty chronology
Civilized Evil (1980)	Live at Donte's (1981)	Mystical Adventures (1982)

Live at Donte's is a live album by jazz violinist Jean-Luc Ponty. It was recorded on March 12 and 13, 1969, at Donte's in North Hollywood, California, but was not officially released until 1981 by Blue Note on vinyl. In 1995, Pacific Jazz reissued the album on CD with four bonus tracks (5–8).

== Track listing ==
1. "Hypomode de Sol" (Jean-Luc Ponty) – 12:45
2. "People" (Jule Styne, Bob Merrill) – 7:53
3. "California" (Jean-Luc Ponty) – 9:42
4. "Eighty-One" (Ron Carter) – 12:20
5. "Foosh" (George Duke) – 7:54
6. "Sara’s Theme" (Michel Legrand) – 3:41
7. "Pamukkale" (Wolfgang Dauner) – 9:26
8. "Cantaloupe Island" (Herbie Hancock) – 8:12

== Personnel ==
- Jean-Luc Ponty – violin
- George Duke – piano
- John Heard – bass
- Al Cecchi – drums

Technical

- Richard Bock – recording engineer
- Michael Cuscuna – reissue producer
- Malcolm Addey – mastering
- Jim Marshall – photography
- Patrique Roques – design
