= Storytelling (Jean-Luc Ponty album) =

Jazz fusion album by Jean-Luc Ponty

Studio album by Jean-Luc Ponty
- Released: July 26, 1989
- Studios: Can-Am Recorders, La Tour d'Ivoire & Legonks (Los Angeles, California); Sigma Sound (Philadelphia, Pennsylvania)
- Genre: Jazz fusion
- Label: Columbia
- Producer: Jean-Luc Ponty

Jean-Luc Ponty chronology
| The Gift of Time (1987) | Storytelling (1989) | Tchokola (1991) |

Professional ratings
Review scores
| Source | Rating |
|---|---|
| AllMusic | 4/5 stars |

Storytelling is an album by French jazz fusion artist Jean-Luc Ponty, released in 1989 as his second album on the Columbia label.

== Track listing ==
All songs by Jean-Luc Ponty unless otherwise noted.

1. "In the Fast Lane" – 4:09
2. "Tender Memories" – 5:20
3. "Spring Episode" – 5:52
4. "Pastoral Harmony" – 4:22
5. "The Storyteller" – 4:26
6. "The Amazon Forest" – 4:27
7. "After the Storm" – 4:21
8. "A Journey's End" – 4:24
9. "Chopin Prelude No. 20 (with violin improvisation)" (Frédéric Chopin) – 2:59

== Personnel ==
- Jean-Luc Ponty – violin, Synclavier synthesizer, keyboards
- Grover Washington Jr. – soprano saxophone on "Tender Memories"
- Jamie Glaser – electric guitar
- Wally Minko – piano, keyboards
- Clara Ponty – piano on "Chopin Prelude No. 20 (w/improvisation)"
- Patrice Rushen – synthesizer on "Tender Memories", synth solo on "After the Storm"
- Baron Browne – electric bass
- Rayford Griffin – drums, percussion
- Kurt Wortman – percussion on "The Amazon Forest"

Production

- Jean-Luc Ponty – producer
- Brian Malouf – producer, engineer, mixing
- John Anthony – engineer
- Erik Zobler – engineer
- Peter Kelsey – overdub engineer
- Jeff Poe – assistant engineer, assistant tracking engineer
- Bernie Grundman – mastering
- David Coleman – art direction
- Nancy Donald – art direction
- John Cutcliffe – production coordination
- Kevin Fisher – studio assistant
- Lawrence Fried – studio assistant
- Adam Silverman – studio assistant

== Charts ==
| Year | Chart | Position |
|---|---|---|
| 1989 | Billboard Top Contemporary Jazz Albums | 4 |
