= Cosmic Messenger =

Studio album by Jean-Luc Ponty
- Released: August 10, 1978
- Recorded: April 1978
- Studios: Cherokee & Chateau Recorders (Hollywood, California)
- Genre: Jazz fusion
- Length: 37:45
- Label: Atlantic
- Producer: Jean-Luc Ponty

Jean-Luc Ponty chronology
Enigmatic Ocean (1977)	Cosmic Messenger (1978)	Live (1979)

Professional ratings
Review scores
Source	Rating
AllMusic	3/5 stars
Music Week	3/4 stars
The Rolling Stone Jazz Record Guide	3/5 stars

Cosmic Messenger is an album by French jazz fusion artist Jean-Luc Ponty, released in 1978.

== Track listing ==
All songs by Jean-Luc Ponty.

1. "Cosmic Messenger" – 4:38
2. "The Art of Happiness" – 4:33
3. "Don't Let the World Pass You By" – 6:23
4. "I Only Feel Good with You" – 3:05
5. "Puppets' Dance" – 3:40
6. "Fake Paradise" – 5:41
7. "Ethereal Mood" – 4:03
8. "Egocentric Molecules" – 5:44

== Personnel ==
- Jean-Luc Ponty – acoustic & electric violin, five-string electric violin, organ, lead synthesizer, Vako Orchestron
- Allan Zavod – keyboards
- Joaquin Lievano – acoustic & electric guitar
- Peter Maunu – acoustic & electric guitar, guitar synthesizer
- Ralphe Armstrong – electric bass guitar, fretless bass guitar
- Casey Scheuerell – drums, percussion

Production

- Engineer & mixing: Ed E. Thacker
- Assistant engineers: Brian Leshon, Chris Gregg, Rick Collins, Russ Bracher
- Mastered by Greg Calbi
- Claudia Ponty – cover concept
- Daved Levitan – front cover painting
- Gary Heery – back cover photo
- Sam Emerson – inner sleeve photos

Recorded at Cherokee Studios, Hollywood, California, and Chateau Recorders, North Hollywood, California.
Mixed at Chateau Recorders.
Mastered at Sterling Sound Inc., New York City, New York.

== Chart positions ==
Year	Chart	Position
1978	Billboard Jazz Albums	2
1978	Billboard Pop Albums	36
