= Imaginary Voyage =

Studio album by Jean-Luc Ponty
- Released: November 4, 1976
- Recorded: July – August 1976
- Studios: Kendun Studios (Burbank, California)
- Genre: Jazz fusion
- Length: 38:10
- Label: Atlantic
- Producer: Jean-Luc Ponty

Jean-Luc Ponty chronology
Aurora (1976)	Imaginary Voyage (1976)	Enigmatic Ocean (1977)

Professional ratings
Review scores
Source	Rating
AllMusic	4/5 stars
The Rolling Stone Jazz Record Guide	3/5 stars

Imaginary Voyage is a studio album by French jazz fusion artist Jean-Luc Ponty. It features guitarist Daryl Stuermer and bassist Tom Fowler (both of whom had played on Ponty’s previous album), along with keyboardist Allan Zavod and drummer Mark Craney. It was released in 1976 on Atlantic Records.

"New Country" was released as a single from the album, with Record World believing that the "brisk sound of the melody" could result in chart success.

== Track listing ==
All songs by Jean-Luc Ponty.

Side one

1. "New Country" – 3:07
2. "The Gardens of Babylon" – 5:06
3. "Wandering on the Milky Way" – 1:50
4. "Once upon a Dream" – 4:08
5. "Tarantula" – 4:04

Side two

1. "Imaginary Voyage" – 19:55
  - "Part I" – 2:22
  - "Part II" – 4:05
  - "Part III" – 5:28
  - "Part IV" – 8:00

== Personnel ==
- Jean-Luc Ponty – acoustic & electric violins, organ, background synthesizers
- Daryl Stuermer – acoustic & electric guitars
- Allan Zavod – acoustic piano & electric keyboards
- Tom Fowler – electric bass
- Mark Craney – drums & percussion

Recorded at Kendun Studios, Burbank, California - July and August 1976.
Mixed at Paramount Studios, Los Angeles, California - August 1976.
Mastered at Atlantic Recording Studios, New York City, New York.

== Chart positions ==
Year	Chart	Position
1977	Billboard Jazz Albums	2
1977	Billboard Pop Albums	67
