= Life Enigma =

Studio album by Jean-Luc Ponty
- Released: August 21, 2001
- Genre: Jazz fusion
- Label: JLP
- Producer: Jean-Luc Ponty

Jean-Luc Ponty chronology
The Very Best of Jean-Luc Ponty (2000)	Life Enigma (2001)	The Best of Jean-Luc Ponty (2002)

Life Enigma is an album by French jazz fusion artist Jean-Luc Ponty, released in 2001. It is his first on his own label, JLP and arrives seven years since his last solo studio release No Absolute Time (1993).

== Critical reception ==
Professional ratings
Review scores
Source	Rating
AllMusic	4/5 stars

Todd Jenkins stated in All About Jazz that "Ponty shows he’s up to the task of carrying the spirit of fusion into the new millennium instead of just mining the same old spent lodes. Though it was a while in coming, Life Enigma was worth every minute of the wait." Glenn Astarita stated that "if you're expecting some of the innovative pyrotechnics and high-octane jazz-fusion witnessed on some of his previous sessions you might be disappointed." Ken Dryden in AllMusic proclaimed, "This is easily one of Jean-Luc Ponty's most compelling releases."

== Track listing ==
All songs by Jean-Luc Ponty.

1. "Two Thousand-One Years Ago" – 4:20
2. "Signals from Planet Earth" – 6:03
3. "The Infinite Human Caravan" – 6:37
4. "Lonely Among All" – 4:25
5. "Firmament" – 7:22
6. "Pizzy Cat" – 3:16
7. "Life Enigma" – 5:56
8. "Even the Sun Will Die" – 5:37
9. "Love at Last Sight" – 5:15
10. "And Life Goes On" – 6:01

== Personnel ==
- Jean-Luc Ponty – violin, keyboards, Synclavier, electronic percussion, electronic drums, effects
- William Lecomte – piano
- Guy N'Sangue – bass
- Thierry Arpino – drums, shaker
- Moustapha Cisse – percussion

Production notes

- Jean-Luc Ponty – producer, engineer
- Karim Sai – mixing, engineer
- Greg Calbi – mastering
- Alan Chappell – art direction, design
- Adam Rogers – photography
- Alvaro Yanez – cover photo
