= The Gift of Time =

Studio album by Jean-Luc Ponty
- Released: 1987
- Studio: La Tour d'Ivoire & Image Recording Studios (Los Angeles, California)
- Genre: Jazz fusion
- Length: 35:12
- Label: Columbia
- Producer: Jean-Luc Ponty

Jean-Luc Ponty chronology
Fables (1985)	The Gift of Time (1987)	Storytelling (1989)

Professional ratings
Review scores
Source	Rating
AllMusic	3.5/5 stars

The Gift of Time is an album by French jazz fusion artist Jean-Luc Ponty, released in 1987. It was his first recording for Columbia Records after twelve albums on the Atlantic label. It was reissued on CD in 1991.

== Track listing ==
All songs by Jean-Luc Ponty.

1. "Prologue" – 1:01
2. "New Resolutions" – 4:47
3. "Faith in You" – 4:46
4. "No More Doubts" – 4:47
5. "Between Sea and Sky" – 5:04
6. "Metamorphosis" – 5:51
7. "Introspective Perceptions" – 7:30
8. "The Gift of Time" – 5:05

== Personnel ==
- Jean-Luc Ponty – violin, Prophet-5 & Synclavier synthesizers, electronic percussion, effects
- Pat Thomi – electric guitar (tracks 2, 4–6)
- Baron Browne – electric bass (tracks 2–6, 8)
- Rayford Griffin – drums, percussion (tracks 2–6, 8)

Production notes

- Jean-Luc Ponty – producer
- David Hentschel – engineer, mixing
- Bernie Grundman – mastering
- Joe Gastwirt – remastering

== Charts ==
Year	Chart	Position
1987	Billboard Top Contemporary Jazz Albums	5
