= Vital Information =

American band

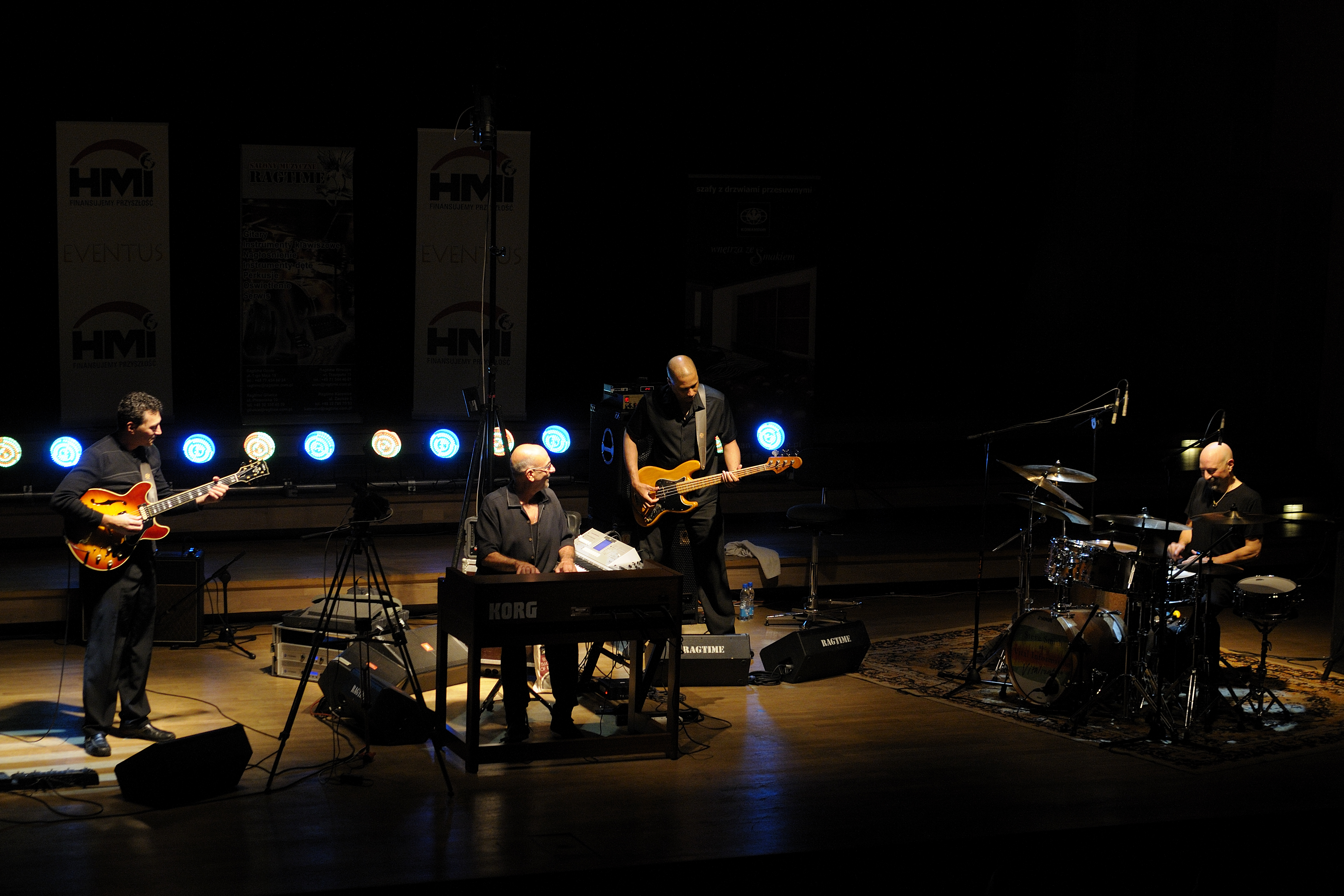
Steve Smith and Vital Information (2009)

Steve Smith and Vital Information is an American jazz fusion group led by drummer Steve Smith.

== History ==
The first line-up of Vital Information — Steve Smith (drums), Tim Landers (bass), and Dave Wilczewski (sax) — met in 1971 during their high school years while playing together in the Bridgewater State College Big Band, a Boston-area college band under the direction of Vincent Gannon. By 1977 Smith was touring with Jean-Luc Ponty, Landers with Al Di Meola, and Wilczewski with Freddie Hubbard. They reunited annually in Boston with guitarists such as Dean Brown, Daryl Stuermer, or Barry Finnerty to complete the band. From 1977 to 1982 the three band members wrote many compositions, played a number of gigs, and developed the sound and concept that became the first edition of Vital Information.

After Smith was in the band Journey for a few years, he signed a contract with Columbia to make his first solo album. The group recorded Vital Information (1983), consisting of Landers, Wilczewski, and guitarists Dean Brown and Mike Stern. The album was recorded in Warren, Rhode Island in January 1983 and released that summer. In September 1983 the band toured the U.S with Dutch guitarist Eef Albers, who was on tour with Miles Davis and Jaco Pastorius. At the end of the tour the group returned to Rhode Island and recorded Orion (1984).

After leaving Journey in 1985, Smith continued as bandleader of Vital Information. Tim Landers and Dave Wilczewski eventually left the group to pursue their own careers. Landers became a studio musician in Los Angeles while Wilczewski moved to Stockholm, Sweden. He died on August 22, 2009. Tom Coster (keyboards), formerly of Santana, joined Vital Information in 1986 and appeared on Global Beat (1987), which integrated hand percussion and steel drums. Kai Eckhardt (bass) joined Vital Information in 1986 and 1987 for tours in the U.S. and Europe. He appeared on the album Fiafiaga (1988), which continued with the Global Beat direction with computer-based and funkier sounds.

A jazzier version of the band consisting of Smith, Coster, Larry Schneider (saxophone), Frank Gambale (guitar), and Larry Grenadier (double bass) recorded Vitalive! (1990). Jeff Andrews (bass) joined the band in the early 1990s, recording Easier Done Than Said (1992) and Ray of Hope (1996).

Vital Information became more groove-oriented on Where We Come From (1998). Baron Browne (bass) joined the band in 1998, which continued their funk-oriented approach. Smith, Coster, Gambale, and Browne recorded Live Around the World (2000), Show 'Em Where You Live (2001), and Live from Mars (2002). On Come on In (2004) Smith introduced Indian rhythms to the band's music. Vinny Valentino joined on Vitalization (2007). Smith continued his interest in Indian rhythm by adding konnakol, a form of vocal percussion.

Smith toured with a version of the band called "Vital Information NYC Edition" that included Valentino, Browne, Mark Soskin on keyboards, and Andy Fusco on alto saxophone. Fusco and Soskin are from Smith's other bands, Buddy's Buddies and Jazz Legacy.

At the Drumeo Festival 2020, Smith formed a new Vital Information trio with bassist Janek Gwizdala and pianist Manuel Valera, which continued into the 2020s. The trio's 2025 album New Perspective featured, for the first time, Vital Information reenvisionings of Journey songs, covering "Don't Stop Believin'", "Who's Crying Now", and "Open Arms."

== Members ==
- Steve Smith – drums (1977–present)
- Janek Gwizdala – bass (2020–present)
- Manuel Valera – piano (2020–present)

=== Former members ===
- Tim Landers – bass (1977–1985)
- Dave Wilczewski – saxophone (1977–1985)
- Dean Brown – guitars (1983–1985)
- Mike Stern – guitars (1983–1985)
- Tom Coster – keyboards (1986–2012)
- Larry Schneider – saxophone (1990–1998)
- Frank Gambale – guitar (1990–2007)
- Larry Grenadier – double bass (1990–1998)
- Jeff Andrews – bass (1992–1998)
- Baron Browne – bass (1998–2020)
- Vinny Valentino – guitar (2007–2020)
- Mark Soskin – keyboards (2017–2020)
- Andy Fusco – alto saxophone (2017–2020)

== Discography ==
- Vital Information (Columbia, 1983)
- Orion (Columbia, 1984)
- Global Beat (Columbia, 1986)
- Fiafiaga (Celebration) (Columbia, 1988)
- Vitalive! (Manhattan, 1991)
- Easier Done Than Said (Manhattan, 1992)
- Ray of Hope (Intuition, 1996)
- Where We Come from (Intuition, 1998)
- Live from Mars (Official concert bootleg, 2001)
- Live Around the World (Intuition, 2000)
- Show 'Em Where You Live (Tone Center, 2002)
- Come on In (Tone Center, 2004)
- Vitalization (Hudson Music, 2007)
- Live! One Great Night (BFM Jazz, 2012)
- Viewpoint (BFM Jazz, 2015)
- Heart of the City (BFM Jazz, 2017)
- Time Flies (Wounded Bird Records, 2023)
- New Perspective (Drum Legacy Records, 2025)
