= Le Voyage =

Le Voyage may refer to:

- Le voyage (Paul Motian album), 1979
- Le Voyage (Sandi Patty album), 1993
- Le Voyage: The Jean-Luc Ponty Anthology, a 1996 compilation album by Jean-Luc Ponty
- Le Voyage, the 1996 graphic novel by Edmond Baudoin
- Le voyage, a 1984 film with Victoria Abril
