= A Taste for Passion =

Studio album by Jean-Luc Ponty
- Released: September 19, 1979
- Recorded: June – July 1979
- Studio: Village Recorders (West Los Angeles, California)
- Genre: Jazz fusion
- Length: 40:22
- Label: Atlantic
- Producer: Jean-Luc Ponty

Jean-Luc Ponty chronology
Live (1979)	A Taste for Passion (1979)	Civilized Evil (1980)

A Taste for Passion is an album by French jazz fusion artist Jean-Luc Ponty, released in 1979. It was reissued by Atlantic Records on CD in 1990 and 1992. The track "Beach Girl" received a nomination for Best Rock Instrumental Performance at the 1981 Grammy Awards.

== Critical reception ==
Professional ratings
Review scores
Source	Rating
AllMusic	3/5 stars
The Rolling Stone Jazz Record Guide	3/5 stars

The Globe and Mail wrote that Ponty's "music is well conceived and realized, structurally sound and texturally colorful (Genesis-ish in spots), drawing equally on rock and classical as a backdrop for jazz improvisation."

== Track listing ==
All songs by Jean-Luc Ponty.

1. "Stay with Me" – 5:35
2. "Sunset Drive" – 5:45
3. "Dreamy Eyes" – 4:18
4. "Beach Girl" – 4:56
5. "A Taste for Passion" – 5:22
6. "Life Cycles" – 5:45
7. "Reminiscence" – 1:26
8. "Give Us a Chance" – 3:02
9. "Obsession" – 0:40
10. "Farewell" – 3:06

== Personnel ==
- Jean-Luc Ponty – acoustic violin, 5-string electric violin; organ & electric piano (tracks 3, 5); grand piano (track 7)
- Joaquin Lievano – acoustic & electric guitar, guitar synth; guitar solos (tracks 3–5)
- Jamie Glaser – electric guitar; guitar solos (tracks 2, 6)
- Allan Zavod – keyboards, synthesizer; synthesizer solos (tracks 6, 8)
- Ralphe Armstrong – fretless electric bass; bass solo (track 2)
- Casey Scheuerell – drums, percussion

Production

- Engineer: Ed E. Thacker
- Assistant engineers: Lenise Bent, Cheech d'Amico
- Mastered by Greg Calbi
- Gary Heery – photography
- Tim Messer – production coordination

Recorded at Village Recorders, West Los Angeles, California.
Mixed at Cherokee Studios, Hollywood, California - June & July 1979.
Mastered at Sterling Sound, New York City.

== Chart positions ==
Year	Chart	Position
1979	Billboard Jazz Albums	4
1979	Billboard Pop Albums	54

== Awards ==
Title	Event	Award	Result
"Beach Girl"	1981 Grammys	Best Rock Instrumental Performance	Nominated
