= Lord Browne =

Lord Browne or Lord Brown may refer to

- Wilfred Brown, Baron Brown (1908–1985), metals company executive
- George Brown, Baron George-Brown (1914–1985), British Labour politician
- Nicholas Browne-Wilkinson, Baron Browne-Wilkinson (born 1930), jurist
- Simon Brown, Baron Brown of Eaton-under-Heywood (born 1937), British jurist
- Wallace Browne, Baron Browne of Belmont (born 1947), Northern Ireland Unionist politician
- John Browne, Baron Browne of Madingley (born 1948), former BP executive
- Des Browne, Baron Browne of Ladyton (born 1952), Scottish Labour politician

== See also ==
- Baron Browne, American musician
