= Cantaloupe Island (album) =

Compilation album by Jean-Luc Ponty
- Released: 1976
- Recorded: 1969
- Studios: Hollywood, California
- Genres: Jazz, avant-garde jazz
- Length: 84:39
- Label: Blue Note
- Producer: Dick Bock

Jean-Luc Ponty chronology
Cantaloupe Island (1976)	Le Voyage: The Jean-Luc Ponty Anthology (1996)

Professional ratings
Review scores
Source	Rating
All About Jazz	(favorable)
Allmusic	4/5 stars
The Rolling Stone Jazz Record Guide	4/5 stars

Cantaloupe Island is a compilation album by French violinist Jean-Luc Ponty that was recorded in 1969 and released in 1976 by Blue Note. It combines two previously issued albums: King Kong: Jean-Luc Ponty Plays the Music of Frank Zappa and Jean-Luc Ponty Experience with the George Duke Trio, both recorded in 1969 for the World Pacific label.

== Reissues ==
- Cantaloupe Island was digitally re-mastered and reissued on CD by BGO in 2006.

== Track listing ==
1. "King Kong" (Frank Zappa) – 4:58
2. "Idiot Bastard Son" (Zappa) – 4:01
3. "Twenty Small Cigars" (Zappa) – 5:35
4. "How Would You Like to Have a Head Like That" (Ponty) – 7:18
5. "Music for Electric Violin and Low Budget Orchestra" (Zappa) – 19:25
6. "America Drinks and Goes Home" (Zappa) – 2:42
7. "Foosh" (George Duke) – 9:01
8. "Pamukkale" (Dauner) – 6:33
9. "Contact" (Ponty) – 7:15
10. "Cantaloupe Island" (Herbie Hancock) – 8:28
11. "Starlight, Starbright" (Jean-Bernard Eisinger) – 9:23

== Personnel ==
- Jean-Luc Ponty – violin, electric violin, baritone violin
- Ernie Watts – alto and tenor saxophone
- Ian Underwood – tenor saxophone
- George Duke – piano
- Frank Zappa – guitar
- Wilton Felder – bass
- John Heard – bass
- Buell Neidlinger – bass
- Dick Berk – drums
- John Guerin – drums
- Art Tripp – drums
- Gene Estes – percussion, vibraphone
- Arthur Maebe – flugelhorn, French horn, tuben
- Vincent DeRosa – French horn, descant
- Gene Cipriano – English horn, oboe
- Jonathan Meyer – flute
- Donald Christlieb – bassoon
- Milton Thomas – viola
- Harold Bemko – cello, electronic sounds

== Production notes ==
- Richard Bock – producer
- Frank Zappa – arranger, composer, conductor
- Ian Underwood– conductor
- Leonard Feather – liner notes
- David Brand – engineer
- Dick Klune – engineer
- Andrew Thompson – remastering
- Michael Cuscuna – reissue producer
