= Eddy Louiss =

French jazz musician (1941–2015)

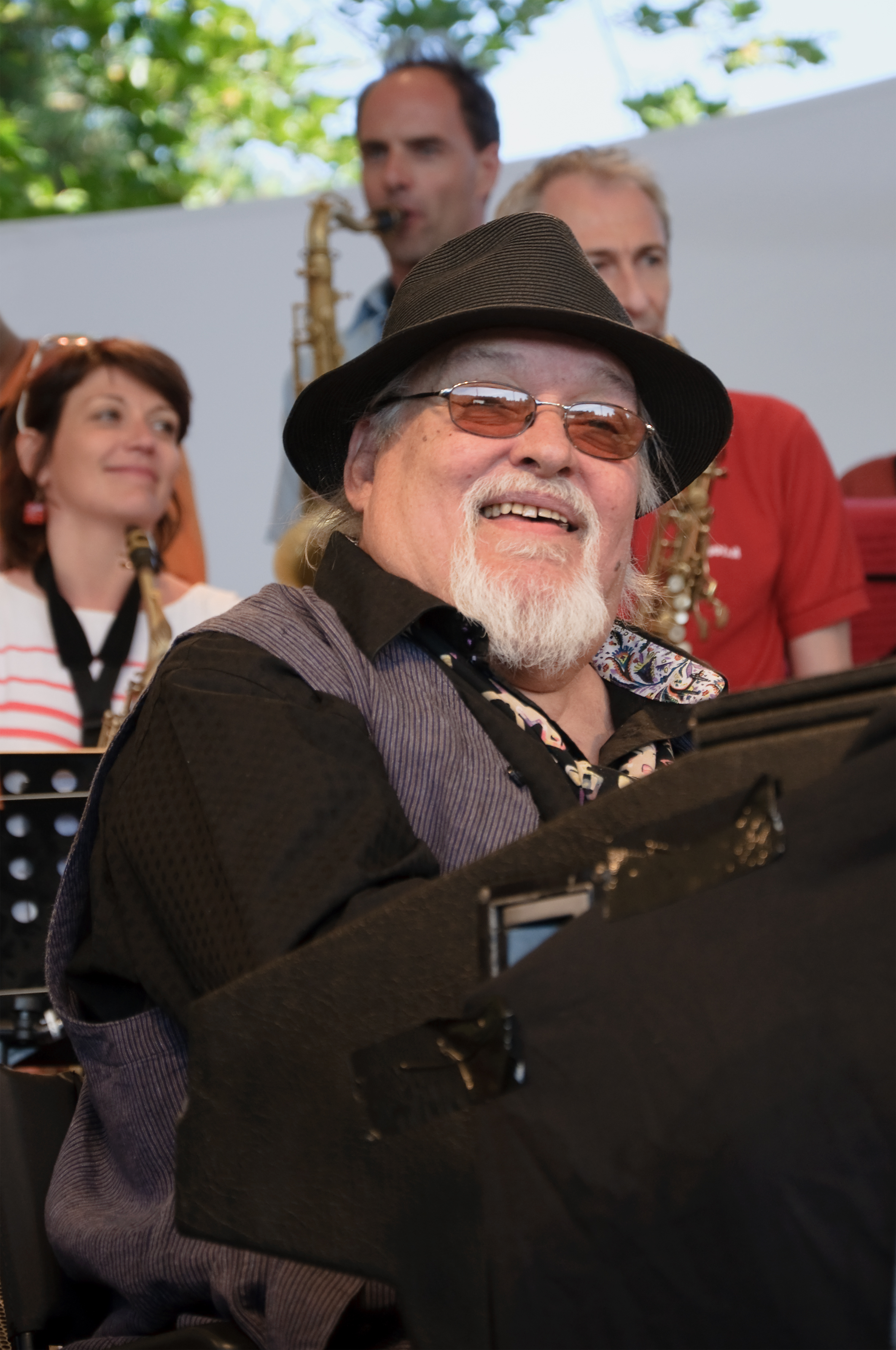
- Eddy Louiss at Paris Jazz Festival, 2011

Background information
- Born: Édouard Louise; 2 May 1941; Paris, France
- Died: 30 June 2015 (aged 74) Poitiers, Vienne, France
- Genres: Jazz, jazz fusion
- Occupation: Musician
- Instruments: Hammond organ, vocals
- Years active: 1957–2015

Eddy Louiss (2 May 1941 – 30 June 2015) was a French jazz musician.

== Career ==
Eddy started playing in his father Pierre's orchestra in the 1950s. Pierre changed the family name from Louise to Louiss. As a vocalist, he was a member of Les Double Six of Paris from 1961 through 1963. During this time his primary instrument became the Hammond organ.

In 1964, he was awarded the Prix Django Reinhardt.

For 13 years, between 1964 and 1977, he played with leading French musician Claude Nougaro. After that, he made the decision, one that his son Pierre described as "not that easy", to split from Nougaro to head out on a solo career.

He worked with Kenny Clarke, René Thomas, and Jean-Luc Ponty. In 1971 he was a member of the Stan Getz quartet (with René Thomas and Bernard Lubat) that recorded the Getz album Dynasty (1971).

Louiss's composition "Blues for Klook," which appeared on his 1987 album Sang mêlé, was likely named for drummer Kenny Clarke, who was nicknamed "Klook." The song became a popular composition among gymnasts and figure skaters. It was used in competition by Silvia Mitova, Maya Usova and Alexander Zhulin, Daisuke Takahashi, among others.

Eddy Louiss had his left leg amputated in the early 1990s after suffering artery problems, following which he made few public appearances.

In duet, he recorded with pianist Michel Petrucciani (1994) and accordionist Richard Galliano (2002). His later recordings, such as Sentimental Feeling and Récit proche, combined jazz with rock and world music.

== Discography ==
- Jazz Long Playing with Daniel Humair and Jean-Luc Ponty (1964)
- Trio HLP with Daniel Humair and Jean-Luc Ponty (All Life, 1966)
- Eddy Louiss Trio with Kenny Clarke, René Thomas (1968)
- Our Kind of Sabi with John Surman, Niels-Henning Ørsted Pedersen and Daniel Humair, 1970
- Orgue, Vols. 1 & 2, with Kenny Clarke, Jimmy Gourley, Guy Pedersen (America, 1971)
- Bohemia After Dark, with Jimmy Gourley, Guy Pedersen, Kenny Clarke, 1973
- Histoire Sans Parole, 1979
- Sang mêlé, 1987
- Eddy Louiss/Michel Petrucciani (live), 1994
- Conférence de presse with Michel Petrucciani, 1994
- Conférence de presse, Vol. 2, 1995
- Louissiana, 1995
- Floméla with Marc Bertaux, Tony Bonfils, Steve Ferrone, Bob Garcia, Jo Maka, Luigi Trussardi, Jean-Louis Viale, 1996
- Multicolor Feeling Fanfare, 1989
- WéBé, 2000
- Recit Proche with Xavier Cobo, Jean Marie Ecay, Paco Sery, 2001
- Jazz in Paris: Bohemia After Dark with Kenny Clarke, Jimmy Gourley, Guy Pedersen, 2001
- Jazz in Paris: Porgy & Bess 2001
- Face to Face with Richard Galliano, 2001
- Ô Toulouse...Hommage à Claude, 2006

With Stan Getz

- Dynasty (Verve, 1971)
- Communications '72 (Verve, 1972)
