= Donte's =

Jazz club and bar in North Hollywood, California, U.S.

Coordinates: 34.14742°N 118.36442°W

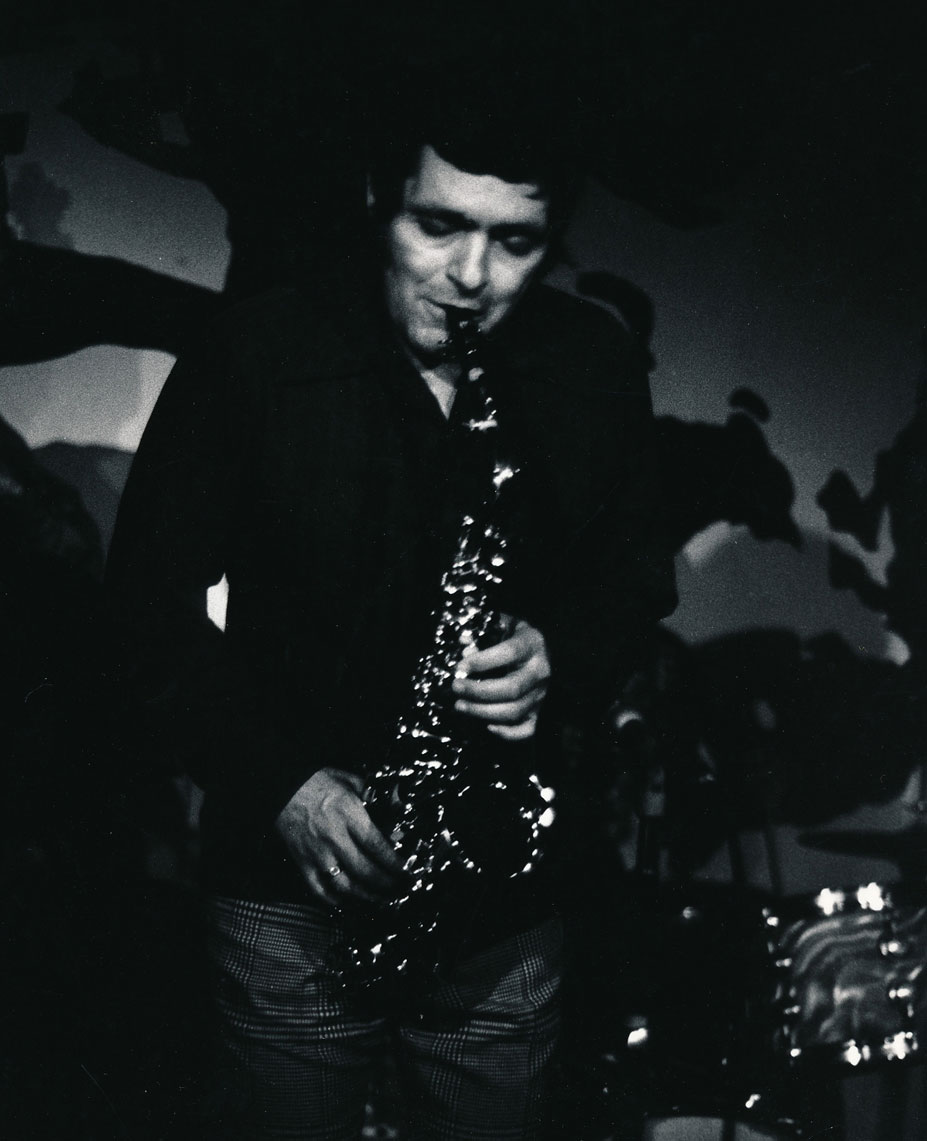
Art Pepper performing at the club in 1980

Donte's was a jazz club and diner and cocktail bar at 4269 Lankershim Boulevard in North Hollywood, Los Angeles, to the north of Universal Studios. One of the West Coast's best known jazz clubs in the 1970s and 1980s, it opened in 1966 and closed in 1988.

== History ==
Donte's was established in 1966. Early performers included Woody Herman, Dizzy Gillespie, Mercer Ellington and Count Basie, and Buddy Rich, Toshiko Akiyoshi, Gerald Wilson, Don Piestrup, Don Menza and Bill Holman all brought their bands to the club. Jazz guitarists Joe Pass and Larry Carlton became regular performers. Pass would play on Monday evenings, which was "Guitar Night", organized by studio guitarist Jack Marshall. Art Pepper would perform on New Year's Eve. Clint Eastwood and Frank Sinatra frequently visited the club. Guitarist Lenny Breau was giving weekly seminars at the club before his death in 1984.

In December 1987, saxophonist Warne Marsh collapsed and died of a heart attack while performing the tune "Out of Nowhere" at the club. Donte's closed in April 1988. The site is now a Century West BMW auto dealer.

== Recordings ==
Numerous albums were recorded at the club, including Jean-Luc Ponty's Live at Donte's (recorded March 12–13 1969), Lenny Breau's Live at Donte's (recorded May 1969) and a second album recorded at Donte's LA Bootleg 1984 (recorded shortly before his Death in 1984 and released in 2014) and Joe Pass's Live at Donte's and Resonance albums (recorded December 8–9, 1974).
