= The Rite of Strings =

Studio album by Al Di Meola, Stanley Clarke and Jean-Luc Ponty
- Released: July 17, 1995
- Recorded: April 1995
- Studio: Studio 56, Hollywood, California
- Genre: Jazz; jazz fusion
- Length: 55:34
- Label: Gai Saber
- Producer: Al Di Meola, Stanley Clarke, Jean-Luc Ponty

Jean-Luc Ponty chronology
No Absolute Time (1993)	The Rite of Strings (1995)	Le Voyage: The Jean-Luc Ponty Anthology (1996)

Stanley Clarke chronology
East River Drive (1993)	The Rite of Strings (1995)	At the Movies (1995)

Professional ratings
Review scores
Source	Rating
AllMusic	4/5 stars

The Rite of Strings is a collaborative album by Al Di Meola, Stanley Clarke, and Jean-Luc Ponty. It was recorded after their world tour in 1995. The album was recorded at Studio 56, Hollywood.

The trio reunited for a performance at the French jazz festival called "Jazz in Marciac" in 2007.

Material from the album was performed on tour by Trio! in 2005, also featuring Clarke and Ponty, with Béla Fleck on banjo instead of Di Meola on guitar.

== Track listing ==
No.	Title	Writer(s)	Length
1.	"Indigo"	Al Di Meola	7:15
2.	"Renaissance"	Jean-Luc Ponty	4:33
3.	"Song to John (dedicated to the memory of John Coltrane)"	Stanley Clarke, Chick Corea	6:00
4.	"Chilean Pipe Song"	Di Meola	6:12
5.	"Topanga"	Clarke	5:50
6.	"Morocco"	Di Meola	5:45
7.	"Change of Life"	Ponty	5:30
8.	"La Cancion De Sofia"	Clarke	8:30
9.	"Memory Canyon"	Ponty	6:00
Total length:			55:35

== Personnel ==
- Al Di Meola – guitar
- Stanley Clarke – double bass
- Jean-Luc Ponty – violin

== Chart performance ==
Year	Chart	Position
1995	Billboard Top Contemporary Jazz Albums	4
