= Casey Scheuerell =

American drummer

- Genres: Jazz, rock, fusion, new-age
- Instrument(s): Drums, percussion
- Website: www.caseyscheuerell.com

Casey Scheuerell is an American jazz, rock and new-age drummer and percussionist.

Scheuerell lived in Sun Prairie, Wisconsin, in the 1970s. He has toured internationally with several musicians.

== Discography ==
- A Pauper in Paradise (Gino Vannelli - 1977)
- Cosmic Messenger (Jean-Luc Ponty - 1978)
- Live (Jean-Luc Ponty album) (Jean-Luc Ponty - 1979)
- A Taste for Passion (Jean-Luc Ponty - 1979)
- What Cha' Gonna Do for Me - "And the Melody Still Lingers (Night in Tunisia)" (Chaka Khan - 1981)
- Gino Vannelli (Gino Vannelli - 1982)
- The Music (Sheree Brown - 1982)
- Clics modernos (Charly García - 1983)
- Open Mind (Jean-Luc Ponty - 1984)
- Kitarō: Live in America (Kitarō - 1991)
- Across a Rainbow Sea (Steve Kindler - 1992)
- The Show Must Go On: The Anthology (Leo Sayer - 1996)
- Red Heat (Vaya) (Jimmy Haslip 2000)

== Drum method ==
- Stickings and Orchestrations for Drum Set (Casey Scheuerell)
