= Mark Craney =

American drummer (1952–2005)

- Born: August 26, 1952; Minneapolis, Minnesota, U.S.
- Died: November 26, 2005 (aged 53) Sherman Oaks, California, U.S.
- Genres: Rock, jazz
- Occupation: Musician
- Instrument: Drums
- Formerly of: Jethro Tull

Mark Craney (August 26, 1952 – November 26, 2005) was an American rock and jazz drummer.

== Biography ==
Craney grew up in Sioux Falls, South Dakota. His father had played the drums and was a big influence on his musical career. He was a left-handed player. Craney initially played with local bands, beginning with the "Vandals" and later, while living in Vermillion, South Dakota, he played with "Zero Ted".

He played on Tommy Bolin's last tour in 1976, Gino Vannelli's album Brother to Brother, released in 1978 and the following tour, and with Jean-Luc Ponty on the famous Imaginary Voyage in 1976 as well as the 1980 album Civilized Evil. He also played with the band Jethro Tull from June 1980 to May 1981, on their album A (1980) and its following tour. Craney also appeared on several tracks from Ph.D. In the mid-1990s he was the drummer for Eric Burdon's I band.

Though his resume was impressive, Craney's greatest commercial success was drumming for the Gino Vannelli single "I Just Wanna Stop" which soared to #4 in the US and #1 in Canada. Craney died of complications from diabetes and pneumonia in Sherman Oaks, California, at the age of 53.
