= Jazz Long Playing =

Studio album by Jean-Luc Ponty
- Released: 1964
- Recorded: June 1 – July 6, 1964
- Genre: Jazz
- Label: Philips
- Producer: Daniel Richard

Jean-Luc Ponty chronology
| Jazz Long Playing (1964) | Sunday Walk (1967) |

Jazz Long Playing - Import
- Jazz Long Playing - Import

Professional ratings
Review scores
| Source | Rating |
|---|---|
| AllMusic | 4/5 stars |

Jazz Long Playing is the debut album by French violinist Jean-Luc Ponty recorded in Paris in June and July 1964. It was reissued in 2000. Jazz Long Playing is one of two albums produced by Ponty; Sunday Walk in 1967 was his second.

== Track listing ==
1. "Une nuit au violin" (Martial Solal) – 4:43
2. "Modo Azul" (Jef Gilson) – 4:38
3. "Spanish Castels" (George Gruntz) – 3:40
4. "Sniffin' the Blues" (Jef Gilson) – 3:28
5. "Postlude in C" (Raymond Fol) – 3:21
6. "Au Privave" (Charlie Parker) – 3:45
7. "Manoir de mes rêves" (Django Reinhardt) – 3:05
8. "YTNOP Blues" (Jean-Luc Ponty) – 3:10
9. "I Want to Talk About You" (Billy Eckstine) – 3:48
10. "A Night in Tunisia" (Dizzy Gillespie) – 3:02
11. "Satin Doll" (Duke Ellington) – 4:20

Tracks 1 & 3 recorded June 1, 1964.
Tracks 2 & 6 recorded June 17, 1964.
Tracks 4, 8 & 11 recorded June 15, 1964.
Tracks 5, 7, 8 & 10 recorded July 6, 1964.

== Personnel ==
- Jean-Luc Ponty – acoustic violin (tracks 2, 4–11), electric violin (tracks 1, 3)
- Michel Portal – flute (tracks 2, 6)
- Eddy Louiss – piano (tracks 1–3, 5–8, 10); organ(tracks 4, 9, 11)
- Gilbert Rovère – double bass (tracks 1–4, 6, 9, 11)
- Guy Pedersen – double bass (tracks 5, 7, 8, 10)
- Daniel Humair – drums

Production

- Producer: Daniel Richard
- Recorded by François Dentan
- Photography by Stan Wiezniak
- Liner notes by Jean Tronchot
