= Mystical Adventures =

Studio album by Jean-Luc Ponty
- Released: January 18, 1982
- Recorded: August–September 1981
- Studios: Cherokee (Los Angeles, California)
- Genre: Jazz fusion
- Length: 41:16
- Label: Atlantic
- Producers: Jean-Luc Ponty, Arif Mardin

Jean-Luc Ponty chronology
Civilized Evil (1980)	Mystical Adventures (1982)	Individual Choice (1983)

Professional ratings
Review scores
Source	Rating
AllMusic	3/5 stars
The Rolling Stone Jazz Record Guide	3/5 stars

Mystical Adventures is an album by French jazz fusion artist Jean-Luc Ponty, released in 1982.

== Track listing ==
All tracks are written by Jean-Luc Ponty unless otherwise noted.

Side one
No.	Title	Length
1.	"Mystical Adventures (Suite) Part I"	3:29
2.	"Mystical Adventures (Suite) Part II"	3:36
3.	"Mystical Adventures (Suite) Part III"	7:29
4.	"Mystical Adventures (Suite) Part IV"	0:47
5.	"Mystical Adventures (Suite) Part V"	5:04

Side two
No.	Title	Writer(s)	Length
6.	"Rhythms of Hope"		4:02
7.	"As"	Stevie Wonder, arranged by Jean-Luc Ponty
8.	"Final Truth Part I"		4:54
9.	"Final Truth Part II"		2:06
10.	"Jig"		3:56
Total length:			41:16

== Personnel ==
- Jean-Luc Ponty – acoustic & electric violins; Yamaha electric piano (tracks 1, 4); Yamaha organ (tracks 2–6, 9, 10); synthesizer (tracks 1, 3, 5, 9); vocoder (tracks 3, 7); voice (track 3)
- Chris Rhyne – grand piano (tracks 2, 5, 8); Fender Rhodes electric piano (tracks 2, 3, 5–7, 10); Prophet-5 & Oberheim Eight Voice synthesizers (tracks 2, 3, 5–10)
- Jamie Glaser – electric guitar (tracks 2, 3, 5–9); acoustic guitar (track 10)
- Randy Jackson – electric bass (tracks 2, 3, 5–10)
- Rayford Griffin – drums (tracks 1–3, 5–10); percussion (track 9); voice (tracks 3, 7)
- Paulinho Da Costa – percussion (tracks 6, 7, 10)

Production

- Producer: Jean-Luc Ponty
- Co-producer: Arif Mardin (track 7)
- Recording engineer: Dee Robb
- Assistant recording engineer: Brad Gilderman
- Overdubs engineers: Bruce Robb, Stuart Graham
- Mixing engineer: Peter R. Kelsey
- Mastered by Bernie Grundman
- Front cover painting by Daved Levitan
- Cover concept by Claudia Ponty
- Back cover photography by Sam Emerson

Recorded at Cherokee Recording Studios, Los Angeles, California, August and September, 1981.

== Charts ==
Year	Chart	Position
1982	Billboard Jazz Albums	1
1982	Billboard Pop Albums	44
