= Tchokola =

Studio album by Jean-Luc Ponty
- Released: May 21, 1991
- Recorded: 1990–1991
- Studio: Davout, Paris, France
- Genre: Jazz fusion
- Length: 53:49
- Label: Epic
- Producer: Jean-Luc Ponty, Brice Wassy

Jean-Luc Ponty chronology
Storytelling (1989)	Tchokola (1991)	No Absolute Time (1993)

Professional ratings
Review scores
Source	Rating
AllMusic	2.5/5 stars

Tchokola is an album by French jazz fusion artist Jean-Luc Ponty, released in 1991. The rhythm section was recorded on analog tape. All other recording was digitally recorded.

== Track listing ==
1. "Mam'maï" (Abdou M'Boup, Willy N'For, Jean-Luc Ponty) – 6:00
2. "Sakka Sakka" (Myriam Betty, N'For, Guy N'Sangue, Brice Wassy) – 5:22
3. "Tchokola" (Wassy) – 5:47
4. "Mouna Bowa" (N'sangue, Ponty) – 6:32
5. "N'Fan Môt" (Ponty, Wassy) – 6:10
6. "Yé ké yé ké" (Mory Kanté) – 4:58
7. "Bamako" (Yves N'Djock, Ponty, Wassy) – 4:31
8. "Rhum 'N' Zouc" (Ponty) – 5:04
9. "Cono" (Salif Keita) – 4:56
10. "Bottle Bop" (NDjock, Nsangue, Wassy) – 4:49

== Personnel ==
- Jean-Luc Ponty – violin, keyboards, electric violin and viola
- Martin Atangana – guitar
- Yves N'Djock – guitar
- Guy N'Sangue – bass
- Brice Wassy – drums, percussion
- Moustapha Cisse – percussion
- Angélique Kidjo – vocals
- Myriam Betty – vocals
- Esther Dobong'Na Essiène (aka Estha Divine)-vocals
- Kémo Kouyaté – harp, background vocals, Balafon, Kora
- Abdou M'Boup – percussion, bongos, vocals, Sabar, Tama, Bugarabu
- Willy N'For – vocals

Production notes

- Jean-Luc Ponty – producer
- Brice Wassy – producer
- Peter Kelsey – engineer, mixing
- David Coleman – art direction, design
- Nancy Donald – art direction

== Charts ==
Chart (1991)	Peak position
US Top Contemporary Jazz Albums (Billboard)	5
