= Thee Experience =

Nightclub in Hollywood, California, United States

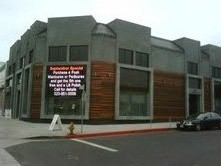
- Location of Thee Experience on Sunset Strip 2011
- Interactive map of Thee Experience
- Former names: Thee Image
- Location: 7551 Sunset Blvd; Hollywood, California 90069
- Coordinates: 34.0984°N 118.3541°W
- Owner: Marshall Brevitz
- Type: nightclub
- Event: rock and roll

Construction
- Opened: March 14, 1969
- Closed: December 1969

Thee Experience was a psychedelic nightclub in Hollywood, California, United States. It was located at 7551 Sunset Boulevard, on the Sunset Strip.

== History ==
Thee Experience was located on Sunset Boulevard, Hollywood, California, from the grand opening on March 14 through December 1969. It has been erroneously listed as located at 7751 Sunset Boulevard; however, the address is clearly visible on period advertisements as 7551 Sunset Blvd. Thee Experience was the brainstorm of owner and founder Marshall Brevitz, who had earlier opened a night club of the same name in 1967 in Hollywood, Florida. The club, which stayed open until 3 am, was so popular it outgrew its space. Brevitz later opted for a larger location, moving the club in early winter of 1968. Marshall had located a disused 32-lane bowling alley known as the Sunny Isles Bowling Center and, with others, converted it into a psychedelic ballroom. The name of the club was changed to "Thee Image Club" located at 18330 Collins Avenue in Miami Beach, Florida., honoring the house- and very popular local band, the Blues Image. Opening night (and two consecutive nights following) featured Frank Zappa and the Mothers of Invention, in March 1968.

By early 1969 Brevitz was persuaded by the likes of Frank Zappa and Eric Burdon to relocate to Southern California. Once he had found the new location for his club, he changed the name back to the original "Thee Experience" and hired someone to paint the exterior as an enlarged portrait of Jimi Hendrix with the front door as his mouth.

== Performers ==
Here is a partial list of some of the bands and performers that played and/or recorded at the club during its brief existence: Alice Cooper (who played the opening night), Frank Zappa, Jean Luc Ponty Experience, Albert Collins, The Flying Burrito Brothers, John Lee Hooker, Big Mama Thornton, Joe Cocker, Eric Burdon, Buddy Miles Express, Elvin Bishop, George Duke Trio, Captain Beefheart, The New Yardbirds (Led Zeppelin), T.I.M.E. (Trust In Men Everywhere), Steve Young, Magical Berri Lee, A.B. Skhy, Fair Be Fall, Rockin' Foo. Pogo (before they changed their name to Poco), Blues Magoos, Southwind, Black Pearl, Junior Markham & the Tulsa Rhythm Revue, Bobby Doyle. Colwell-Winfield Blues Band, SRC, Blues Image, Screaming Lord Sutch & the Mighty Fat, Fields, Illinois Speed Press, Linn County, C.K. Strong, Sons of Champlin, T.S. Song, Joe Cocker & the Grease Band, Bluesberry Jam, Bangor Flying Circus, Roxy Music, War (with Eric Burdon), Lonnie Mack, Baby, Stoneface, Grand Funk Railroad, Tyrannosaurus Rex, Tarantula, Albert Lee, Spencer Davis Group, Jimi Hendrix, The Young Bloods and many others.

== See also ==
- Rainbow Bar and Grill
- Roxy Theatre
- Sunset Strip
- Troubadour
- Viper Room
