= Jean-Luc Ponty in Concert =

Live album by Jean-Luc Ponty
- Released: 2003
- Recorded: Warsaw, Poland
- Genre: Jazz fusion
- Label: JLP Productions
- Producer: Jean-Luc Ponty

Jean-Luc Ponty chronology
| Live at Semper Opera (2002) | Jean-Luc Ponty in Concert (2003) | The Atacama Experience (2007) |

Professional ratings
Review scores
| Source | Rating |
|---|---|
| Allmusic | 4.5/5 stars |

Jean-Luc Ponty in Concert is a DVD and live CD by French jazz fusion artist Jean-Luc Ponty, released in 2003. Originally, the DVD with the concert performance in Warsaw, Poland was released.

== Track listing ==
All songs by Jean-Luc Ponty unless otherwise noted.

1. "Rhythms of Hope" – 7:57
2. "Jig" – 8:07
3. "No Absolute Time" – 10:38
4. "Pastoral Harmony" – 8:25
5. "Caracas" – 8:36
6. "Memories of California" – 5:41
7. "Mouna Bowa" (Ponty, Guy N'Sangue) – 8:59
8. "Enigmatic Ocean, Pt. 2" – 7:16
9. "Open Mind" – 5:14

== Personnel ==
- Jean-Luc Ponty – violin, keyboards, Synclavier, electronic percussion, electronic drums, effects
- William Lecomte – piano
- Guy N'Sangue – bass
- Thierry Arpino – drums
- Moustapha Cisse – percussion
