= Open Mind (album) =

Studio album by Jean-Luc Ponty
- Released: July 5, 1984
- Recorded: May – July 1984
- Studio: La Tour d'Ivoire & Mad Hatter (Los Angeles, California); The Village Recorder (West Los Angeles, California); The Enterprise (Burbank, California); Atlantic (New York City, New York)
- Genre: Jazz fusion
- Length: 39:18
- Label: Atlantic
- Producer: Jean-Luc Ponty

Jean-Luc Ponty chronology
Individual Choice (1983)	Open Mind (1984)	Fables (1985)

Professional ratings
Review scores
Source	Rating
AllMusic	3.5/5 stars
The Rolling Stone Jazz Record Guide	3/5 stars

Open Mind is an album by French jazz fusion artist Jean-Luc Ponty, released in 1984.

== Track listing ==
All songs by Jean-Luc Ponty.

1. "Open Mind" – 8:05
2. "Solitude" – 6:05
3. "Watching Birds" – 4:57
4. "Modern Times Blues" – 7:17
5. "Orbital Encounters" – 5:14
6. "Intuition" – 7:40

== Personnel ==
- Jean-Luc Ponty – violin, violectra, piano, organ, synthesizer, keyboards, vocals, rhythm programming
- George Benson – electric guitar (track 4)
- Chick Corea – synthesizer (tracks 1, 3)
- Casey Scheuerell – drums, tabla (track 3)
- Rayford Griffin – drums, percussion (track 5)

Production notes

- Jean-Luc Ponty – producer
- Dan Nash – engineer
- Peter R. Kelsey – engineer, mixing
- Steve Hirsch – engineer, assistant engineer
- Dave Marquette – engineer, assistant engineer
- John Molino – engineer, assistant engineer
- Jay Willis – engineer, assistant engineer
- Dan Warme – engineer, assistant engineer
- Gary Wagner – engineer, assistant engineer
- Claudia Ponty – cover art concept

== Charts ==
Year	Chart	Position
1984	Billboard Jazz Albums	5
1984	Billboard 200	171
