= Isaiah Stewart (drummer) =

American jazz musician (born 1966)

Isaiah Stewart (January 6, 1966) is an American jazz-funk drummer, composer, producer and recording artist.

== Biography ==
Stewart has released six albums, the most recent featuring Randy Brecker, Eumir Deodato, Tom Scott, and Jamie Glaser with additional engineering and production by Jason Miles.

His song "Summer Girl" was nominated for "Best Jazz Composition" by the Hollywood Music in Media Awards in 2018.

Stewart's highest selling album to date Thrill Ride, featuring Glaser, remained in ReverbNation's top ten worldwide rankings for eight consecutive weeks.

He studied musical composition and arrangement at the Berklee College of Music and drumming with Steve Gadd, Billy Cobham, Tony Williams, Dave Weckl, Mike Portnoy, and Virgil Donati.

Stewart resides in Salt Lake City, Utah.

== Discography ==
2000: Life Games (Fortress Hill)

2005: Urban Playground (Fortress Hill)

2010: Won World (Fortress Hill)

2010: Groove Garden (Fortress Hill)

2015: Thrill Ride (Fortress Hill)

2018: Summer Beat (Fortress Hill)
