= Jimmy Gourley =

American jazz guitarist (1926–2008)

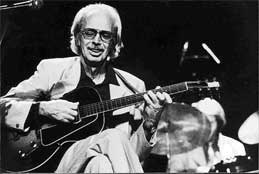

Background information
- Birth name: James Pasco Gourley, Jr.
- Born: June 9, 1926; St. Louis, Missouri, U.S.
- Died: December 7, 2008 (aged 82); Villeneuve-Saint-Georges, France
- Genres: Jazz
- Occupation: Musician
- Instrument: Guitar
- Years active: 1940–2008
- Labels: Elabeth

James Pasco Gourley, Jr. (June 9, 1926 – December 7, 2008) was an American jazz guitarist who spent most of his life in Paris.

Gourley was born in St. Louis in 1926. He met saxophonist Lee Konitz in Chicago when both were members of the same high school band. He credits Konitz with encouraging him to become a serious musician. Gourley's father started the Monarch Conservatory of Music in Hammond, Indiana, though he didn't teach, and he bought Gourley his first guitar. Gourley took his first guitar classes at the school. He became interested in jazz while listening to the radio, enjoying in particular Nat King Cole. For his first professional experience as a performer, he dropped out of high school to play with a jazz band in Oklahoma City.

From 1944–1946, Gourley served in the U.S. Navy. After he returned to Chicago, he met guitarist Jimmy Raney and wanted to play like him. He worked in bars and clubs with Jackie Cain & Roy Kral, Anita O'Day, Sonny Stitt, and Gene Ammons. Through the G.I. Bill, he received tuition for three years to any college in the world.

Beginning in 1951, Gourley spent the rest of his life in France, working with Henri Renaud, Lou Bennett, Kenny Clarke, Richard Galliano, Stéphane Grappelli, Bobby Jaspar, Eddy Louiss, Martial Solal, and Barney Wilen. He played with American musicians who were passing through, including Bob Brookmeyer, Clifford Brown, Stan Getz, Gigi Gryce, Roy Haynes, Lee Konitz, Bud Powell, Zoot Sims, Lucky Thompson, and Lester Young.

== Discography ==
=== As leader ===
- Americans in Europe Vol. 1 (Impulse!, 1963)
- Graffitti (Promophone, 1977)
- No More (Musica, 1981)
- The Jazz Trio with Marc Johnson & Philippe Combelle (Bingow, 1983)
- Jimmy Gourley and the Paris Heavyweights (52e Rue Est, 1984)
- The Left Bank of New York (Uptown, 1986)
- Flyin' the Coop with Richard Galliano (52e Rue Est, 1991)
- Repetition (Elabeth, 1995)
- Double Action (Elabeth, 1999)
- Straight Ahead Express (Elabeth, 2004)
- Our Delight (Elabeth, 2006)

=== As sideman ===
With Lou Bennett

- Amen (RCA 1960)
- Lou Bennett et Son Quintette Avec Kenny Clarke (Bel Air, 1964)
- Dansez et Revez (Phono, 2017)

With Stan Getz

- In Paris 1958–1959 (Royal, 1987)
- Pennies from Heaven (Eclipse, 1990)
- Sweetie Pie (Philology, 1992)
- With European Friends (LRC, 1990)
- 1959 (Fremeaux, 2018)

With Stephane Grappelli

- Les Valseuses (Festival, 1974)
- Satin Doll (Festival, 1974)
- Stephane Grappelli Plays George Gershwin (Festival,)

With Lee Konitz

- Lee Konitz Plays (Vogue, 1953)
- Quintets (Vogue, 1992)
- Ezz-thetic! (Prestige, 1970)

With others

- Buddy Banks, Jazz de Chambre (Le Club Francais, 1956)
- Clifford Brown, The Clifford Brown Sextet in Paris (Prestige, 1970)
- Bob Brookmeyer, Bob Brookmeyer Quintet (Vogue, 1956)
- Donald Byrd & Barney Wilen, Jazz in Camera (Sonorama, 2012)
- Nathan Davis, Peace Treaty (SFP, 2007)
- Christian Escoude, Gipsy Waltz (Mercury, 1989)
- Samson Francois, L' Edition Integrale (EMI, 2010)
- Gigi Gryce & Clifford Brown, Jazz Time Paris Vol. 11 (Vogue, 1954)
- Roy Haynes, Roy Haynes Modern Group (Swing, 1955)
- Chubby Jackson, Chubby's Back! (Jazz Beat 512)
- Bobby Jaspar & Henri Renaud, New Sound from Belgium Vol. 4 (Vogue, 1953)
- Guy Lafitte, Jambo! (RCA Victor, 1968)
- Eddy Louiss, Orgue (America, 1972)
- Eddy Louiss, Orgue Vol. 2 (America, 1973)
- Brew Moore, Live in Europe 1961 (Sonorama, 2015)
- Sandy Mosse, Chicago Scene (Argo, 1957)
- Nat Pierce, Dick Collins, Ralph Burns, Play Paris (Fantasy, 2001)
- Henri Renaud, Henri Renaud et Son Trio (Vogue, 1997)
- Henri Renaud, Modern Sounds: France (Contemporary, 1953)
- Zoot Sims, Zoot Goes to Town: (Vogue, 1953)
- Zoot Sims, Zoot Sims & Frank Rosolino (Vogue, 1986)
- Sugar Blue, Cross Roads (Blue Sound, 1979)
- Sugar Blue, From Paris to Chicago (EPM, 1988)
- Lucky Thompson, Bop & Ballads (Sonorama, 2016)
- Benny Waters, In Paris (President, 1967)
- Lester Young, Le Dernier Message de Lester Young (Barclay, 1959)
- Lester Young, Lester Young in Paris (Verve, 1960)
