= Randy Jackson =

American record executive, television presenter and musician (born 1956)

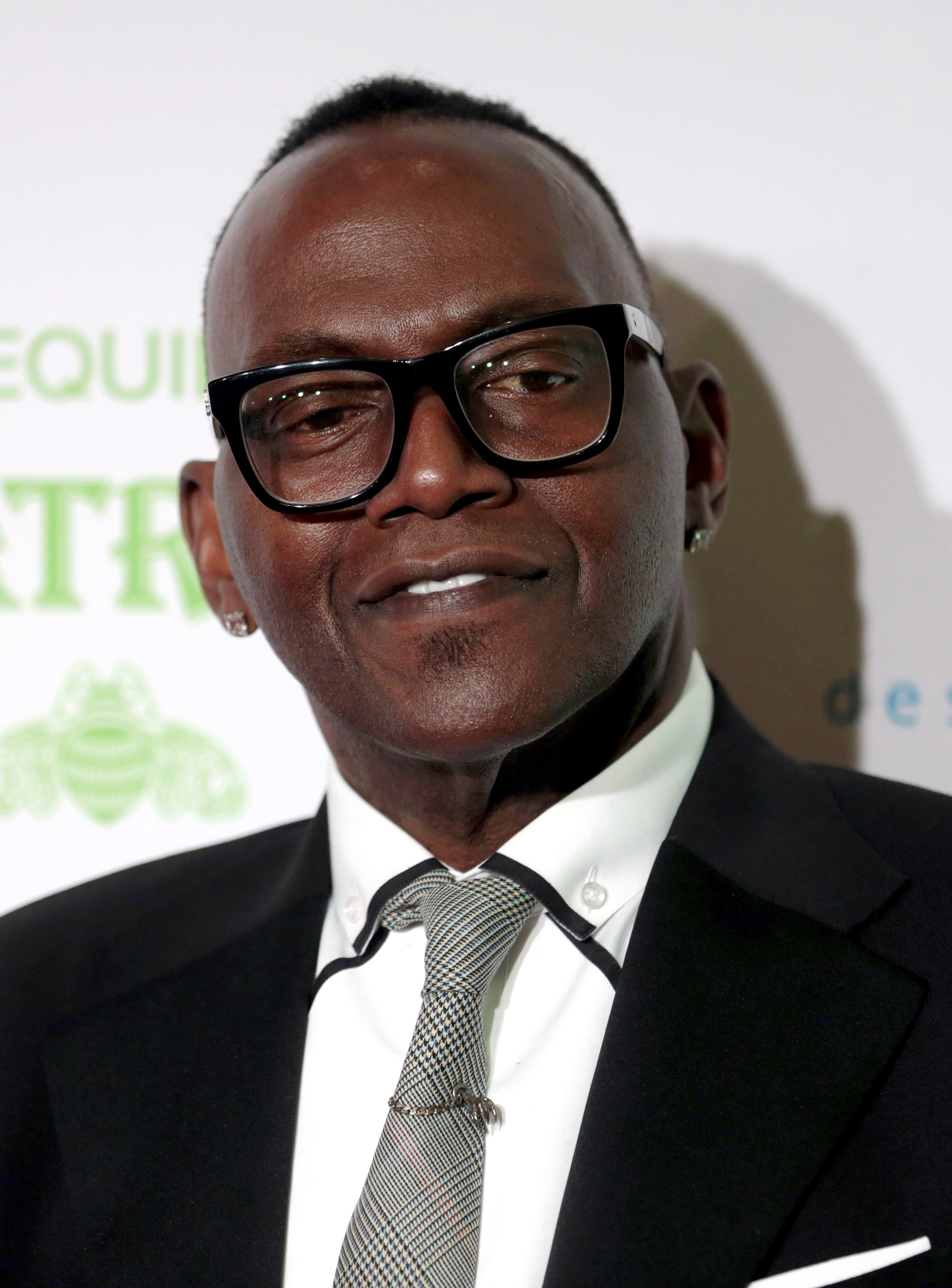
- Jackson in March 2018

Background information
- Born: Randall Darius Jackson; June 23, 1956 (age 70); Baton Rouge, Louisiana, U.S.
- Education: Southern University (BM)
- Occupations: Record executive; television presenter; musician; record producer
- Instruments: Bass; keyboards
- Years active: 1983–present
- Labels: Dream Merchant 21; Concord; Columbia
- Formerly of: Divinyls; Journey
- Spouse(s): Elizabeth Jackson (m. 1990; ann. 1990) Erika Riker (m. 1995; div. 2019)

Randall Darius Jackson (born June 23, 1956) is an American record executive, television presenter and musician, best known as a judge on American Idol from 2002 to 2013.

Jackson has a prolific career as a session musician, primarily playing bass guitar for an array of jazz, pop, rock, and R&B performers since the 1980s. He moved on to work in music production and in the A&R department at Columbia Records and MCA Records. Jackson is best known from his appearances as the longest-serving judge on American Idol and executive producer for MTV's America's Best Dance Crew.

In May 2020, Jackson was rehired as bassist for Journey following their sudden split with founding member Ross Valory.

== Early life ==
Jackson was born June 23, 1956, in Baton Rouge, Louisiana, the son of Julia, a homemaker, and Herman Jackson, a plant foreman. He graduated from Southern University in 1979 with a bachelor's degree in music.

== Music career ==
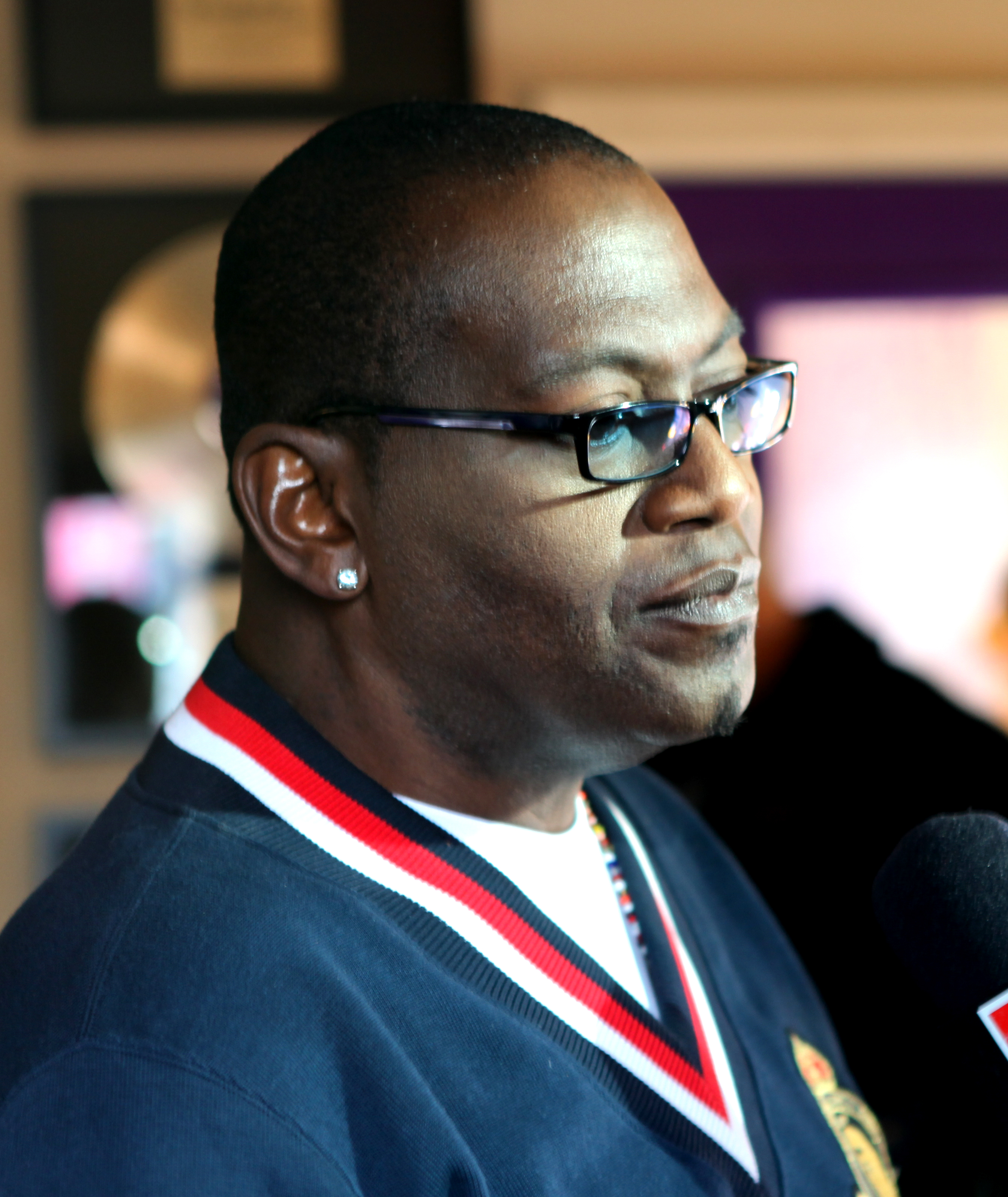
Jackson in 2009

Throughout his career, Jackson performed on more than 1,000 recordings, and is thus connected to more than 200 million record sales worldwide.

=== As a session musician ===
In the early 1980s, he played on three albums for Jean-Luc Ponty and with the rock band Taxxi. From 1986 to 1987, he joined the rock group Journey, initially as a session musician for their 1986 album Raised on Radio, before joining the band for the subsequent tour. He moved to Italy in the late 1980s and played on a record by Italian pop star Zucchero. The record, Zucchero and the Randy Jackson Band, was produced by Corrado Rustici who played guitar with Jackson on many albums in the early 1980s. Zucchero and Jackson presented the album's lead single "Donne" at the 35th edition of the Sanremo Music Festival.

In 1985, Keith Richards was asked to provide music for the Whoopi Goldberg comedy vehicle Jumpin' Jack Flash. Richards assembled an all-star band which included Aretha Franklin on piano and lead vocals and Jackson on bass guitar. This song was the fourth track on Aretha's 1986 album titled Aretha. Jackson can be seen in the song's video. In the late 1980s, Jackson was still doing sessions. He was notably on the first solo album by famed session guitarist Steve Lukather. Jackson was a featured bass guitarist on five songs on Maze's 1989 "Silky Soul" album. He also performed on several of Kenny G's albums.

Jackson was the bass guitarist on the 1991 self-titled Divinyls album (which features the song "I Touch Myself") as well as featured bassist on several tracks of Tracy Chapman's 1992 release, Matters of the Heart. He performed on the singles "Bang Bang Bang", "Open Arms", and "Dreaming on a World". That same year, Jackson also played bass on Bruce Springsteen's song "Human Touch".

=== Solo career ===
On March 11, 2008, Jackson released an album produced entirely by himself, titled Randy Jackson's Music Club, Vol. 1. The album's release was preceded by the single "Dance Like There's No Tomorrow" sung by Paula Abdul. In 2009, Randy began working with former Idol finalist Kimberley Locke, producing her 4th album. The lead single, "Strobe Light", was released March 16, 2010.

Jackson is the manager for the Charlotte-based band Paper Tongues. With the help of Jackson, they signed with a major label, A&M/Octone Records. He has also worked as an executive, spending eight years as vice president of artists and repertoire (A&R) at Columbia Records and four years heading A&R at MCA Records.

=== Radio program ===
Jackson also hosts a radio top 40 countdown known as Randy Jackson's Hit List, which is syndicated by Westwood One. Every week, Jackson counts down his top 30 Urban AC and Mainstream AC hits. He also gives behind-the-scenes information on American Idol on the internet radio station Artist Underground.

== Television ==
=== American Idol ===
Starting in 2002, Jackson was one of the panel judges on the Fox Network reality television series American Idol, along with Paula Abdul (2002–2009), Simon Cowell (2002–2010), Kara DioGuardi (2009–2010), Ellen DeGeneres (2010), Jennifer Lopez (2011–2012), Steven Tyler (2011–2012), Nicki Minaj (2013), Mariah Carey (2013), and Keith Urban (2013). As a result of Cowell's departure, Jackson was left as the sole original judge on American Idol. His role was originally going to be reduced to that of a mentor, so the 2013 season would have all new judges, but it was later decided that he would remain as a judge for season 12. On May 9, 2013, Jackson announced that he would be leaving American Idol after twelve seasons due to him wanting to focus on other business ventures. On September 3, 2013, it was announced that Jackson would replace Jimmy Iovine as the in-house mentor on American Idol. He departed the series for good in November 2014.

=== America's Best Dance Crew ===
Jackson produced America's Best Dance Crew, an American group dance competition and reality television show, which premiered on February 7, 2008, on MTV and was cancelled in 2012 due to declining ratings. Each week, the teams showcased their creative talents in choreography and their dance skills, and one crew was eliminated by the judges. The competition continued until the sole winning dance crew was awarded the title of America's Best Dance Crew, and a cash prize of $100,000.

=== Name That Tune ===
Jackson served as bandleader on the revival of Name That Tune from January 2021 until December 2025. On July 14, 2026, it was announced that Jackson had decided to leave the show, being replaced by Robin Thicke.

== Personal life ==
Jackson's first marriage, to Elizabeth Jackson, was dissolved in 1990; they had one daughter named Taylor. In 1995, Jackson married Erika Riker, with whom he has two children, a daughter named Zoe and a son named Jordan. In 2014, Riker filed for divorce citing irreconcilable differences; it was finalized in 2019.

In 2003, Jackson lost 114 pounds (52 kilograms) following gastric bypass surgery. He stated in a February 2008 television commercial that he has type 2 diabetes.

== Discography ==
=== Albums ===
Year	Album details	Chart positions	
Year	Album details	US	US R&B
2008	Randy Jackson's Music Club, Vol. 1: Released: March 11, 2008; Label: Dream Merchant	50	33

=== Singles ===
Year	Single	Peak chart positions					Album
Year	Single	US	US Pop	US Dance	US AC	CAN	Album
2008	"Dance Like There's No Tomorrow" (with Paula Abdul)	62	48	2	29	68	Randy Jackson's Music Club, Vol. 1
2008	"Real Love" (with Katharine McPhee and Elliott Yamin)	—	—	—	—	—	Randy Jackson's Music Club, Vol. 1
"—" denotes releases that did not chart

=== As sideman ===
With Journey

- Frontiers (Columbia, 1983) (bass on "After the Fall")
- Raised on Radio (Columbia, 1986)
- Freedom (BMG, 2022)

With Richard Marx

- Repeat Offender (Capitol, 1989)

With Neal Schon

- Late Nite (Columbia, 1989)

With Jean-Luc Ponty

- Civilized Evil (Atlantic, 1980)
- Mystical Adventures (Atlantic, 1982)
- Individual Choice (Atlantic, 1983)

With Stryper

- Against the Law (Enigma, 1990) (bass on "Shining Star")
