= Electric Connection =

Studio album by Jean-Luc Ponty
- Released: May 1969
- Recorded: March 3–4, 1969
- Genre: Jazz
- Length: 38:43
- Label: World Pacific Jazz
- Producer: Richard Bock

Jean-Luc Ponty chronology
More Than Meets The Ear (1968)	Electric Connection (1969)	Jean-Luc Ponty Experience with the George Duke Trio (1969)

Professional ratings
Review scores
Source	Rating
AllMusic	4/5 stars
All About Jazz	4/5 stars

Electric Connection is a jazz album by Jean-Luc Ponty released in 1969 on vinyl by World Pacific Jazz and reissued in 1993 on CD by One Way Records. The album is the first recorded collaboration between Ponty and keyboardist George Duke, whom Ponty later recommended to Frank Zappa.

== Track listing ==
=== Side one ===
1. "Summit Soul" (Jean-Luc Ponty) – 4:55
2. "Hypomode del Sol" (Jean-Luc Ponty) – 6:27
3. "Scarborough Fair/Canticle" (Art Garfunkel, Paul Simon) – 3:02
4. "The Name of the Game" (Dave Grusin) – 5:27

=== Side two ===
1. "The Loner" (Ronnie Mathews, Cedar Walton) – 4:29
2. "Waltz for Clara" (Jean-Luc Ponty) – 5:09
3. "Forget" (Don Sebesky) – 4:25
4. "Eighty-One" (Ron Carter) – 6:35

== Personnel ==
- Jean-Luc Ponty – violin
- George Duke – piano
- Wilbert Longmire – guitar
- Bob West – bass
- Paul Humphrey – drums
- Tony Ortega – flute
- Bud Shank – alto saxophone
- Richard Aplan – baritone saxophone
- William Peterson, Tony Rusch, Larry McGuire, Paul Hubinon – trumpet
- Frank Strong – trombone
- Thurman Green – trombone
- Mike Wimberly – bass trombone

Technical

- Gerald Wilson – arranger, conductor
- Lanky Linatrot – engineer
- Richard Bock – producer
