= Clara Ponty =

- Born: Paris, France
- Genres: Jazz, classical crossover, pop
- Occupation: Musician
- Instrument: Piano
- Years active: 1997–present
- Labels: Philips, Harmonia Mundi, Eden Records, C.M.G.
- Website: claraponty.com

Clara Ponty is a French-American pianist, vocalist, and composer.

== Early life and education ==
Ponty is the daughter of jazz violinist and composer Jean-Luc Ponty. Born in Paris but raised in Los Angeles since age four, she began studying violin and piano at the age of five. By the time she was eight, she had written her first piece. She participated in local competitions in Los Angeles and won her first award at age eleven.

Clara Ponty continued her studies into her early teens when she was accepted into the prestigious music program at Interlochen Arts Academy in Michigan.

== Career ==
Ponty moved to Manhattan, New York City where her debut recording for Philips Music Group / Universal Records simply titled Clara Ponty was recorded and released in 1997. It featured the artist performing original works for solo piano.

It was followed in 1999, her second album The Embrace on which Ponty revealed her depth as a composer, pianist and vocalist with ten new original works. Both recordings have met with critical acclaim. Featured prominently in mainstream media such as "People" and "Forbes magazines", Ponty's appeal transcends genres. "The Embrace" reached number 1 on New Age Voice's "Airwaves Top 100", a playlist reported by radio programmers across America. Following the release of these recordings, she performed concerts in the US, Canada, and Europe.

Fond of Indian culture, one of Clara's dreams materialized in December 2002 when she performed in Bombay and New Delhi for the first time.

Ponty wrote twelve new pieces for her third album entitled Mirror of Truth released in North America on J.L.P. Productions in August 2004 and in Europe in 2006. Her father co-produced this new project with her and contributed a couple of violin solos and strings arrangements, besides the collaboration of cello, guitar, bass and percussion.

In November 2010, a compilation album called ECHOES was released in Europe. This jazz album of thirteen instrumental pieces was written by Clara Ponty. She is joined and in collaboration with renowned European jazz musicians, Wolfgang Haffner on drums, Dieter ILg on bass and Ernst Ströer on percussion. Guest trumpet artists, Sebastien Studnitsky and Nils Wulker also appear on a couple of tracks.

In 2011 her new vocal album Into the Light was released in France and Canada. It was released worldwide in April 2012.

== Personal life ==
She currently resides in Paris.

== Discography ==
- Clara Ponty (1997)
- L'étreinte (1999)
- Miroir de vérité (2005)
- Echoes (2010)
- Dans la lumière (2019)
- Mon album piano (2024)
- Mon album jazz (2025)
