= More Than Meets The Ear =

Studio album by Jean-Luc Ponty
- Released: 1968
- Recorded: 1968
- Genre: Jazz
- Length: 34:34
- Label: World Pacific Jazz
- Producer: Sigi Loch

Jean-Luc Ponty chronology
Sunday Walk (1967)	More Than Meets The Ear (1968)	Electric Connection (1969)

Professional ratings
Review scores
Source	Rating
AllMusic	4/5 stars

More Than Meets The Ear is a jazz album by jazz violinist Jean-Luc Ponty released in 1968 on vinyl by World Pacific Jazz.

== Track listing ==
=== Side one ===
1. "With A Little Help From My Friends" (John Lennon, Paul McCartney) – 2:50
2. "3 + 2 = 1" (George Gruntz) – 5:54
3. "California" (Jean-Luc Ponty) – 5:46
4. "Gimme Little Sign" (Alfred Smith, Jerry Winn, Joe Hooven) – 2:35

=== Side two ===
1. "Pata Pata" (Jerry Ragavoy, Miriam Makeba) – 3:05
2. "Pebble Peach Walk" (George Gruntz) – 4:15
3. "Pacific Drove" (Jean-Luc Ponty) – 5:34
4. "Fort Ord Canon" (George Gruntz) – 4:35

== Personnel ==
- Jean-Luc Ponty – violin
- George Gruntz – piano
- Guy Pedersen – bass
- Daniel Humair – drums
- Leo Wright – alto saxophone, flute
- Carmell Jones – trumpet

Production

- Sigi Loch – producer
- George Gruntz – arranger
- Woody Woodward – art direction
- Gabor Halmos – design
- Peter Whorf – photography
