= Live at Semper Opera =

Live album by Jean-Luc Ponty
- Released: July 23, 2002
- Recorded: May 25, 2001
- Venue: Semper Opera, Dresden, Germany
- Genre: Jazz fusion
- Label: JLP Productions
- Producer: Jean-Luc Ponty

Jean-Luc Ponty chronology
The Best of Jean-Luc Ponty (2002)	Live at Semper Opera (2002)	Jean-Luc Ponty in Concert (2003)

Professional ratings
Review scores
Source	Rating
Allmusic	3/5 stars
All About Jazz	(very favourable)

Live at Semper Opera is a live album by French jazz fusion artist Jean-Luc Ponty, released in 2002.

== Track listing ==
All songs by Jean-Luc Ponty unless otherwise noted.

1. "Imaginary Voyage - Infinite Pursuit" – 11:16
2. "Jig" – 9:39
3. "Forever Together" – 6:18
4. "No Absolute Time" – 10:48
5. "Mirage" – 3:57
6. "Enigmatic Ocean, Pts. 1 & 2" – 10:26
7. "Band Introduction" – 2:10
8. "Mouna Bowa" (Ponty, Guy N'Sangue) – 8:44
9. "Caracas" – 8:56

== Personnel ==
- Jean-Luc Ponty – violin, keyboards, Synclavier, electronic percussion, electronic drums, effects
- William Lecomte – piano
- Guy N'Sangue – bass
- Thierry Arpino – drums
- Moustapha Cisse – percussion
