= Enigmatic Ocean =

Studio album by Jean-Luc Ponty
- Released: September 1, 1977
- Recorded: June – July 1977
- Studio: Kendun Studios (Burbank, California)
- Genre: Jazz fusion, jazz-rock
- Length: 40:27
- Label: Atlantic
- Producer: Jean-Luc Ponty

Jean-Luc Ponty chronology
Imaginary Voyage (1976)	Enigmatic Ocean (1977)	Cosmic Messenger (1978)

Professional ratings
Review scores
Source	Rating
AllMusic	4.5/5 stars
The Rolling Stone Jazz Record Guide	3/5 stars

Enigmatic Ocean is a studio album by French jazz fusion artist Jean-Luc Ponty, released in 1977. It features guitarists Allan Holdsworth and Daryl Stuermer, keyboardist Allan Zavod, bassist Ralphe Armstrong (with whom Ponty had played in Mahavishnu Orchestra), and drummer Steve Smith. It reached #1 on the Billboard Jazz album chart in 1977.

== Track listing ==
All music composed, orchestrated and conducted by Jean-Luc Ponty (from the original album cover).

1. "Overture" – 0:47
2. "The Trans-Love Express" – 3:59
3. "Mirage" – 4:53
4. "Enigmatic Ocean - Part I" – 2:23
5. "Enigmatic Ocean - Part II" – 3:35
6. "Enigmatic Ocean - Part III" – 3:42
7. "Enigmatic Ocean - Part IV" – 2:26
8. "Nostalgic Lady" – 5:24
9. "The Struggle of the Turtle to the Sea - Part I" – 3:35
10. "The Struggle of the Turtle to the Sea - Part II" – 3:34
11. "The Struggle of the Turtle to the Sea - Part III" – 6:03

== Personnel ==
- Jean-Luc Ponty – electric violin, five-string electric violin, violectra, bells; grand piano on "Nostalgic Lady"
- Allan Holdsworth – lead electric guitar
- Daryl Stuermer – lead & rhythm electric guitar
- Allan Zavod – organ, synthesizer, electric piano, grand piano, Hohner clavinet
- Ralphe Armstrong – electric basses, fretless bass
- Steve Smith – drums and percussion

=== Solos ===
- (2) : JL Ponty (violin) & D. Stuermer (guitar)
- (3) : JL Ponty (violin) & A. Zavod (synthesizer)
- (5) : JL Ponty (violin), D. Stuermer (guitar), A. Zavod (synthesizer) & A. Holdsworth (guitar)
- (6) : A. Holdsworth (guitar) & JL Ponty (violin)
- (8) : JL Ponty (violin) & A. Holdsworth (guitar)
- (9) : A. Zavod (synthesizer)
- (10) : JL Ponty (violectra)
- (11) : R. Armstrong (bass straight and with devices), D. Stuermer (guitar), S. Smith (drums) & A. Holdsworth (guitar)

== Production ==
- Producer: Jean-Luc Ponty
- Engineer: Larry Hirsch
- Tape handler technician: Mitch Gibson
- Mastered by John Golden
- Front cover photography by Andy Kent
- Liner photography by Frank Moscati

== Chart positions ==
Year	Chart	Position
1977	Billboard Jazz Albums	1
1977	Billboard Pop Albums	35
