= The Jean-Luc Ponty Experience with the George Duke Trio =

Live album by Jean-Luc Ponty and George Duke
- Released: December 1969
- Recorded: September 22, 1969
- Venues: Thee Experience, Hollywood
- Genre: Jazz fusion
- Length: 39:26
- Label: Pacific Jazz
- Producer: Dick Bock

Jean-Luc Ponty chronology
Electric Connection (1969)	The Jean-Luc Ponty Experience with the George Duke Trio (1969)	King Kong: Jean-Luc Ponty Plays the Music of Frank Zappa (1970)

Professional ratings
Review scores
Source	Rating
AllMusic	3/5 stars

The Jean-Luc Ponty Experience with the George Duke Trio is a jazz album released in 1969 by Jean-Luc Ponty on World Pacific Jazz in the US, and is considered to be one of the earliest jazz fusion albums. This was the third album of note for pianist George Duke.

== History ==
The Jean-Luc Ponty Experience with the George Duke Trio album was recorded live in Hollywood, California in mid-September, 1969. A number of jazz musicians were experimenting with the jazz-rock fusion that would become so popular in the 1970s, but Jean-Luc Ponty is one of the earliest to get it down on vinyl. Ponty was inspired by Miles Davis to explore this new fusion form and is considered the first significant jazz musician to record on the electric violin. Later, in the 1970s, he pioneered the use of five- and six-string violins and was the first to combine the violin with MIDI, distortion boxes, phase shifters, and wah-wah pedals.

== Reissues ==
- Jean-Luc Ponty Experience with the George Duke Trio was reissued on the Pausa label in 1980 and 1991.
- One Way Records reissued The Jean-Luc Ponty Experience with the George Duke Trio on CD in 1993.

== Back cover quotes ==
"Jean-Luc Ponty is a young marvel and my nomination for Jazz man of the year." —Leonard Feather, Los Angeles Times

"Jean-Luc Ponty send electric chills up and down the walls of Thee Experience with a most exciting and personal blending of Rock and Jazz music." —Los Angeles Herald Examiner

== Track listing ==
1. "Foosh" (George Duke) – 8:48
2. "Pamukkale" (Wolfgang Dauner) – 6:15
3. "Contact" (Jean-Luc Ponty) – 7:03
4. "Cantaloupe Island" (Herbie Hancock) – 8:20
5. "Starlight, Starbright" (Jean-Bernard Eisinger) – 9:00

== Personnel ==
- Jean-Luc Ponty - electric violin
- George Duke - electric piano
- John Heard - amplified bass
- Dick Berk - drums

Technical

- Richard Bock - producer
- David Brand - engineer
- Kevin Leveque - cover, sleeve illustration
