= Civilized Evil =

Studio album by Jean-Luc Ponty
- Released: September 19, 1980
- Recorded: June–July 1980
- Studio: Village Recorders (West Los Angeles, California)
- Genre: Jazz fusion
- Length: 39:40
- Label: Atlantic
- Producer: Jean-Luc Ponty

Jean-Luc Ponty chronology
| A Taste for Passion (1979) | Civilized Evil (1980) | Mystical Adventures (1982) |

Professional ratings
Review scores
| Source | Rating |
|---|---|
| AllMusic | 3/5 stars |
| The Rolling Stone Jazz Record Guide | 3/5 stars |

Civilized Evil is an album by French jazz fusion artist Jean-Luc Ponty, released in 1980. It was reissued by Atlantic Records on CD in 1992.

== Track listing ==
All songs by Jean-Luc Ponty.

1. "Demagomania" – 6:25
2. "In Case We Survive" – 4:06
3. "Forms of Life" – 4:48
4. "Peace Crusaders" – 5:38
5. "Happy Robots" – 4:14
6. "Shape Up Your Mind" – 5:15
7. "Good Guys, Bad Guys" – 4:41
8. "Once a Blue Planet" – 4:02

== Personnel ==
- Jean-Luc Ponty – acoustic & electric violins; keyboards & synth bass (track 3)
- Chris Rhyne – keyboards (tracks 1, 2, 4–8)
- Joaquin Lievano – electric rhythm guitar (tracks 1, 2, 4–7); acoustic guitar (track 8)
- Darryl Stuermer - guitar solo (tracks 5,7)
- Randy Jackson – electric bass (tracks 1, 2, 4–7)
- Mark Craney – drums (tracks 1, 2, 4–7)

Production

- Gary Starr – engineer
- Karen Siegel – engineer, assistant engineer
- Mark Hanauer – photography
- Bernie Grundman – mastering
- Claudia Ponty – cover art concept

== Chart positions ==
| Year | Chart | Position |
|---|---|---|
| 1980 | Billboard Jazz Albums | 3 |
| 1980 | Billboard Pop Albums | 73 |
