= No Absolute Time =

Studio album by Jean-Luc Ponty
- Released: July 19, 1993
- Recorded: December 1992 – March 1993
- Studio: Davout, Paris, France, Westlake, Los Angeles, Home Studio, Santa Monica, CA
- Genre: Jazz fusion
- Length: 56:53
- Label: Atlantic
- Producer: Jean-Luc Ponty

Jean-Luc Ponty chronology
Tchokola (1991)	No Absolute Time (1993)	The Rite of Strings (1995)

Professional ratings
Review scores
Source	Rating
AllMusic	3/5 stars

No Absolute Time is an album by French jazz fusion artist Jean-Luc Ponty, released in 1993. It marks his return to the Atlantic label.

== Track listing ==
All songs by Jean-Luc Ponty.

1. "No Absolute Time" – 5:42
2. "Savannah" – 9:18
3. "Lost Illusions" – 5:03
4. "Dance of the Spirits" – 4:59
5. "Forever Together" – 5:46
6. "Caracas" – 3:53
7. "The African Spirit" – 4:58
8. "Speak Out" – 6:23
9. "Blue Mambo" – 6:12
10. "The Child in You" – 4:33

== Personnel ==
- Jean-Luc Ponty – violin, keyboards, electric violin and viola, synthesizer
- Martin Atangana – guitar
- Kevin Eubanks – guitar (on "Blue Mambo")
- Guy N'Sangue – bass, sound effects
- Moustapha Cisse – percussion
- Kémo Kouyaté – harp, background vocals, Balafon, Kora
- Abdou M'Boup – percussion, drums, sound effects, tambourine, bells, shaker, cowbell, bougarabou drums
- Mokhtar Samba – percussion, drums, timbales, cowbell, doundoumba, bougarabou drums
- Sydney Thiam – percussion, sound effects, bells, shaker, doundoumba
- Wally Minko – piano, keyboards

Production notes

- Jean-Luc Ponty – producer
- Eduardo Chermont – engineer
- Steve Harrison – engineer
- Peter Kelsey – engineer
- Patrice Lazareff – engineer
- Bernie Grundman – mastering

== Charts ==
Year	Chart	Position
1993	Billboard Top Contemporary Jazz Albums	5
