= Individual Choice =

Studio album by Jean-Luc Ponty
- Released: August 1, 1983
- Recorded: March–May 1983
- Studios: Music Grinder and Cherokee (Hollywood, California)
- Genres: Jazz fusion, electronic
- Length: 37:05
- Labels: Atlantic; 80098
- Producer: Jean-Luc Ponty

Jean-Luc Ponty chronology
Mystical Adventures (1982)	Individual Choice (1983)	Open Mind (1984)

Professional ratings
Review scores
Source	Rating
AllMusic	3.5/5 stars
The Rolling Stone Jazz Record Guide	3/5 stars

Individual Choice is an album by French jazz fusion violinist Jean-Luc Ponty, released in 1983.

A music video for the title track was produced by Louis Schwarzberg in 1984, consisting of time-lapsed footage of New York City, Chicago, and Seattle. In 1996, the song “Computer Incantations for World Peace” became the basis of the house-music track “Love, Love, Love” by Those Guys.

== Track listing ==
All tracks are written by Jean-Luc Ponty.

No.	Title	Length
1.	"Computer Incantations for World Peace"	5:41
2.	"Far from the Beaten Paths"	5:59
3.	"In Spiritual Love"	7:01
4.	"Eulogy to Oscar Romero"	2:32
5.	"Nostalgia"	5:02
6.	"Individual Choice"	4:56
7.	"In Spite of All"	5:55

== Personnel ==
- Jean-Luc Ponty – violin (all), synthesizers (1–6), keyboard bass (3, 5, 6), rhythm computer (3), organ (5)
- George Duke – Minimoog solo (3)
- Allan Holdsworth – guitar (5, 7)
- Randy Jackson – bass (2, 7)
- Rayford Griffin – drums (2, 7), percussion (6)

Production notes

- Jean-Luc Ponty – producer
- Gary Skardina – drum recordings
- Peter R. Kelsey – engineer, mixing
- Stuart Graham – engineer, assistant engineer
- Steve Hall – engineer, mastering
- Mark Hanauer – photography
- Bob Defrin – art direction

== Charts ==
Chart (1983)	Position
US Billboard Traditional Jazz Albums	2
US Billboard Top Current Album Sales	134
US Billboard 200	85
