= Le Voyage: The Jean-Luc Ponty Anthology =

Compilation album by Jean-Luc Ponty
- Released: January 23, 1996
- Recorded: May 25, 1975–March 1993
- Genre: Jazz fusion
- Length: 141:57
- Label: Rhino
- Producer: Jean-Luc Ponty

Jean-Luc Ponty chronology
Cantaloupe Island (1976)	Le Voyage: The Jean-Luc Ponty Anthology (1996)	The Very Best of Jean-Luc Ponty (2000)

Professional ratings
Review scores
Source	Rating
Allmusic	4.5/5 stars

Le Voyage: The Jean-Luc Ponty Anthology is a compilation album by French jazz fusion artist Jean-Luc Ponty, released in 1996.

== Track listing ==
All songs by Jean-Luc Ponty.

1. "Question with No Answer" – 3:29
2. "Bowing-Bowing" – 4:53
3. "Echoes of the Future" – 3:11
4. "Aurora, Pt. 2" – 6:15
5. "Waking Dream" – 2:26
6. "Renaissance" – 5:48
7. "New Country" – 3:09
8. "Enigmatic Ocean, Pt. 2" – 3:37
9. "Enigmatic Ocean, Pt. 3" – 3:43
10. "Mirage" – 4:54
11. "Egocentric Molecules" – 5:49
12. "Cosmic Messenger" – 4:41
13. "Ethereal Mood" – 4:04
14. "I Only Feel Good with You" – 3:17
15. "No Strings Attached" (live) – 6:02
16. "Stay with Me" – 5:36
17. "A Taste for Passion" – 5:25
18. "Once a Blue Planet" – 4:05
19. "Forms of Life" – 4:49
20. "Rhythms of Hope" – 4:03
21. "Mystical Adventures, Pt. 4" – 0:47
22. "Mystical Adventures, Pt. 5" – 5:06
23. "Jig" – 3:58
24. "Final Truth, Pt. 1" – 4:55
25. "Computer Incantations for World Peace" – 5:41
26. "Individual Choice" – 4:57
27. "Nostalgia" – 5:03
28. "Eulogy to Oscar Romero" – 2:34
29. "Infinite Pursuit" – 5:59
30. "In the Kingdom of Peace" – 4:04
31. "Caracas" – 3:51
32. "Forever Together" – 5:46
