= Allan Zavod =

Australian musician (1945–2016)

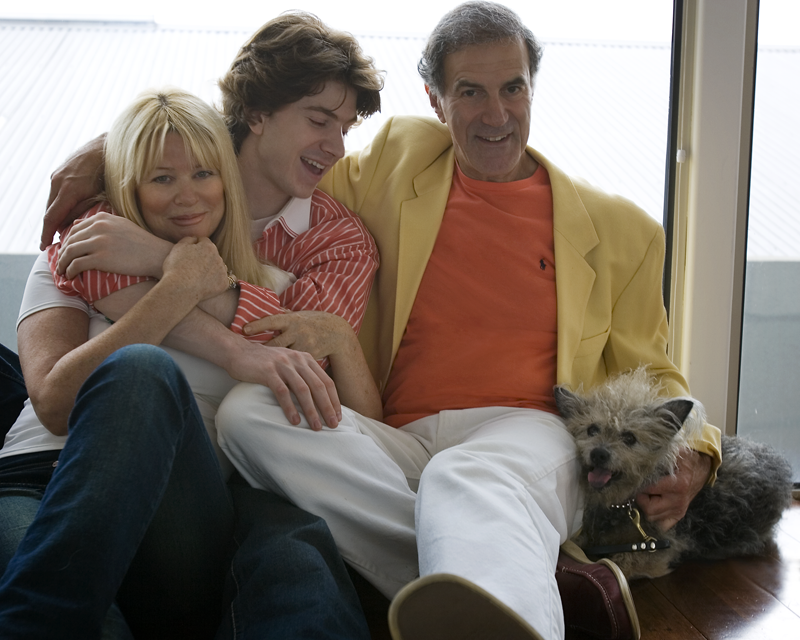
- Pianist Allan Zavod

Background information
- Born: 16 October 1945; Melbourne, Victoria, Australia
- Died: 29 November 2016 (aged 71) Melbourne, Victoria, Australia
- Genres: Jazz fusion, jazz
- Occupations: Musician, actor
- Instruments: Piano, electric piano
- Years active: 1972–2016
- Formerly of: Glenn Miller Orchestra
- Website: www.allanzavod.com

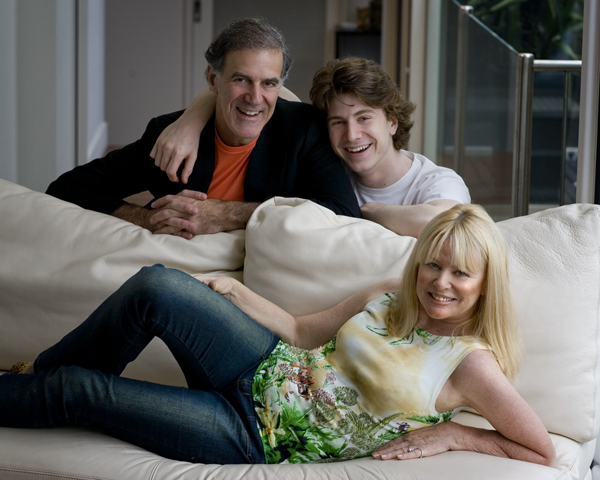

Allan Zavod OAM (16 October 1945 – 29 November 2016) was an Australian pianist, composer, jazz musician and occasional conductor whose career was mainly in America.

Zavod completed a music degree from the Melbourne Conservatorium, University of Melbourne in 1969. His talent as a pianist was recognised by Duke Ellington, who arranged for him to study at the Berklee College of Music, Boston – where Zavod was later a professor of music.

The University of Melbourne awarded Zavod the Degree of Doctor of Music in recognition of his international achievements as a composer.

Zavod wrote "Time Can't Keep Us Apart" which represented Australia at the 1987 ABU Popular Song Contest. It was performed by Kate Ceberano and won.

== Discography ==
=== Albums ===
List of albums, with selected details
Title	Details
What's New!	Released: 1980; Label: Jazznote (JNLP 024); Format: LP
Death of a Soldier (Original Motion Picture Soundtrack)	Released: 1985; Label: Avan-Guard (SBL 12001); Format: LP
The Time Guardian (Original Motion Picture Soundtrack)	Released: 1987; Label: Avan-Guard (SBL 12001); Format: LP

== Awards ==
In 2009, he was awarded the Doctor of Music Degree by the University of Melbourne. Being one of only four recipients of an earned doctorate in composition over the history of the university, this higher doctorate is awarded to scholars who have "made an international contribution to music knowledge".
