= Baron Browne =

American jazz musician (1955–2021)

Baron Browne (March 5, 1955 – September 2, 2021) was an American bass guitarist.

== Career ==
Born and raised in Georgia, USA, Baron Browne gravitated to music at a very early age, learning to play his uncle's drumset at 7 years old. As a teenager he dabbled in piano lessons and at age 12 played guitar for a year before realizing that bass guitar was to be his instrument. At age 18, Baron was launched into the professional music scene right out of high school, moving to Boston and studying at the Berklee College of Music. After studying at the prestigious school for a year, he began working full-time in Boston with artists such as Kevin Eubanks, Tiger Okoshi, Mike Stern, Bill Frisell and Dean Brown.

In 1983, Baron received a call from jazz-fusion violinist Jean-Luc Ponty. After touring for three years and recording three albums with Ponty, Billy Cobham came calling. Baron traveled extensively throughout Europe and the U.S. with the drummer. After three years and two albums with Cobham, Baron returned to the Ponty band for more work. In 1992, Baron joined the group Steps Ahead featuring Mike Mainieri and Saturday Night Live saxophonist Alex Foster. One year later he was invited by renowned jazz vibraphonist Gary Burton to join him for tours of Japan, Europe and the US.

Baron's versatility with playing all styles of music allowed him to also perform with R&B and Pop artists such as Brian McKnight, Tom Jones and Exposé. In 1996, Ponty called on Baron once again to record his first live album in over 20 years (Live at Chene Park). The album received rave reviews from jazz critics. In 1997 Baron's talents were secured by renowned Journey drummer Steve Smith for a European tour with his group Vital Information.

The bassist has made several television appearances, including The Pat Sajak Show on CBS and Ohne Filter in Germany. Baron can be heard on many albums by jazz recording artist Walter Beasley. Walter's album For Your Pleasure reached the number one spot on the Billboard magazine contemporary jazz chart. Because of Baron's musical experience, Walter also made Baron musical director of his touring band.

In 1999 Baron went on an extensive tour of Europe, the U.S., Australia and New Zealand with Vital Information to help promote their CD entitled Where We Come From. A double live CD called Live Around The World documenting the band on that tour was released in 2000.

In the year 2002 Baron continued to tour with Vital Information to promote the CD Show ‘Em Where You Live. He was also included in the writing and producing of this album. While working with Vital Information, Steve Smith also used Baron for his Buddy Rich tribute band Buddy's Buddies with Mark Soskin and Buddy Rich alumnus Steve Marcus and Andy Fusco. They have released two live recordings showcasing that lineup, Very Live At Ronnie Scott's Set Number One and Very Live At Ronnie Scott's Set Number Two.

As of 2004, Baron continues to write and perform with Vital Information as a full-fledged member. Their latest release Come On In received rave reviews from jazz critics around the world. Baron has continued to play a role in the music industry. He has expanded his range to include producing and arranging for other artists as well as his own projects.

Baron has also toured and performed with Angela Bofill, Stanley Clarke, Tom Browne, Billy Cobham, Kevin Eubanks, Lonnie Liston Smith, Noel Pointer, Freddie Hubbard, Tiger Okoshi, Kenny G, Jean-Luc Ponty, Dave Valentine, Stanley Turrentine, Gary Burton, Larry Coryell, Randy Brecker, Al Di Meola, Exposé, Tom Jones, Brian McKnight, Walter Beasley, and Aydın Esen, Tommy Campbell, Sa Davis and Andrea Bocelli.

Browne died on September 2, 2021, aged 61.

== Discography ==
- Tiger Okoshi, Muddcake (JVC)
- Frank Quintero, Frank Quintero (CBS Venezuela)
- Kevin Eubanks, Sundance (GRP)
- Jean-Luc Ponty, Fables (Atlantic)
- Jean-Luc Ponty, The Gift of Time (Atlantic)
- Jean-Luc Ponty, Storytelling (Atlantic)
- Jean-Luc Ponty, Live at Chene Park (Atlantic)
- Billy Cobham, Warning (GRP)
- Billy Cobham, Power Play (GRP)
- Mark O'Conner, Heroes (CBS)
- Walter Beasley, Tonight We Love (Shenachie) (also listed as Arranger)
- Walter Beasley, For Your Pleasure (Shenachie) (also listed as Producer)
- Gabriela Anders, Wanting (CBS)
- Walter Beasley, Won't You Let Me Love You (Shenachie)
- Walter Beasley, Rendezvous (Shenachie) (also listed as Producer)
- Walter Beasley, Go With The Flow (Shenachie)
- Vital Information, Live Around The World (Intuition)
- Aydın Esen, Timescape (BMG)
- Vital Information, Show ‘Em Where You Live (Tone Center)
- Steve Smith and Buddy's Buddies, Very Live At Ronnie Scott's - Set One (Tone Center)
- Steve Smith and Buddy's Buddies, Very Live At Ronnie Scott's - Set Two (Tone Center)
- Steve Smith and Vital Information, Come On In (Tone Center)
- Andrea Bocelli, Andrea (Sugar)
- Mike Visconti, Take 3
- Mike Visconti, In Other Words
- Mike Visconti, Boston Accent
