= Jamie Glaser =

American guitarist (born 1955)

Jamie Glaser (born January 21, 1955, in New York City), is an American guitarist best known for his guitar work on popular television shows like Seinfeld, Saved by the Bell, and Married... with Children. He has recorded and toured with Bryan Adams, Jean-Luc Ponty, Chick Corea, The Manhattan Transfer, Lenny White, and Gloria Trevi.

The album The Dream was his European solo release in 1989.

Gander Guitars has released a Jamie Glaser signature model.

Gelvin Guitars had released a Jamie Glaser signature model called the JG 2.0, it had been replaced with the JG 3.0.

Glaser was a guest artist on the Isaiah Stewart albums Thrill Ride (2015), and Summer Beat (2018), which featured Randy Brecker, Eumir Deodato, and Tom Scott, with additional engineering and production by Jason Miles.

Currently living in Utah, Glaser is the musical director for the trumpet group the Brunson Brothers.
