= Jean-Luc Ponty =

French jazz violinist and composer

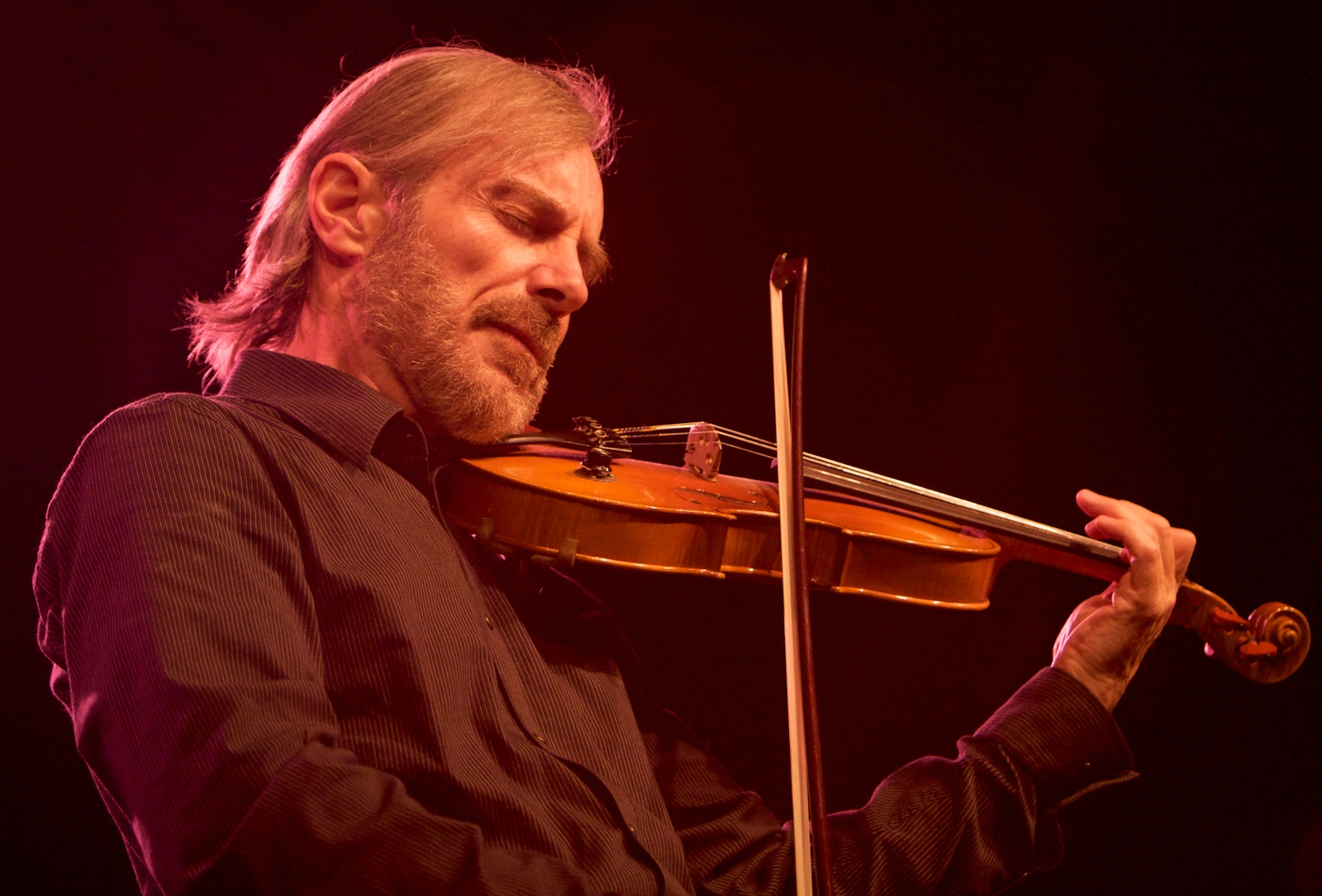
- Jean-Luc Ponty at the Nice Jazz Festival in 2008

Background information
- Born: 29 September 1942 (age 84); Avranches, France
- Genres: Jazz; jazz fusion
- Occupation: Musician
- Instruments: Violin; keyboards
- Years active: 1958–present
- Labels: Atlantic; Columbia; Blue Note; Prestige; World Pacific Records; Philips; Epic; Koch; Polygram; J.L.P. Productions
- Website: ponty.com

Jean-Luc Ponty (French pronunciation: [ʒɑ̃lyk pɔ̃ti]; born 29 September 1942) is a French jazz and jazz fusion violinist and composer. He is considered a pioneer of jazz-rock, particularly for his use of the electric violin starting in the 1970s. He rose to prominence for his collaborations with popular musical artists Frank Zappa and Elton John. In addition to his solo work, he has performed with symphony orchestras in France, the United States, Canada, and Japan.

== Early life ==
Ponty was born into a family of classical musicians in Avranches, France. His father taught violin, and his mother taught piano. At sixteen, he was admitted to the Conservatoire National Supérieur de Musique de Paris, graduating two years later with the institution's highest diploma, Premier Prix (first prize). He was hired by the Orchestre Lamoureux in which he played for three years.

While still a member of the orchestra in Paris, Ponty picked up a side job playing clarinet (which his father had taught him) for a college jazz band that regularly performed at local parties. It proved life-changing. A growing interest in Miles Davis and John Coltrane compelled him to take up tenor saxophone. One night after an orchestra concert, and still wearing his tuxedo, Ponty found himself at a local club with only his violin. Within four years, he was widely accepted as the leading figure in "jazz fiddle".

At that time, Ponty was leading a dual musical life: rehearsing and performing with the orchestra while also playing jazz at clubs throughout Paris. The demands of that schedule eventually brought him to a crossroads. Critic Joachim-Ernst Berendt wrote that "Since Ponty, the jazz violin has been a different instrument".

== Success with the violin ==
At first, the violin proved to be challenging; few at the time viewed the instrument as having a legitimate place in the modern jazz vocabulary. With a powerful sound that eschewed vibrato, Ponty distinguished himself with bebop phrasing and a punchy style influenced more by horn players than by anything previously tried on the violin. In 1964, at age 22, he released his debut album, Jazz Long Playing. He performed on stage in Basel, Switzerland, with string players Stuff Smith, Stéphane Grappelli, and Svend Asmussen. The performance was released as the album Violin Summit (1966).

John Lewis of the Modern Jazz Quartet invited Ponty to perform at the Monterey Jazz Festival in 1967, which led to a recording contract with the World Pacific label and the albums Electric Connection (1969) with the Gerald Wilson Big Band and Jean-Luc Ponty Experience with the George Duke Trio (1969). That year also brought Sunday Walk (1967), the first collaboration between Ponty and Niels-Henning Ørsted Pedersen.

== Frank Zappa and emigration to the United States ==
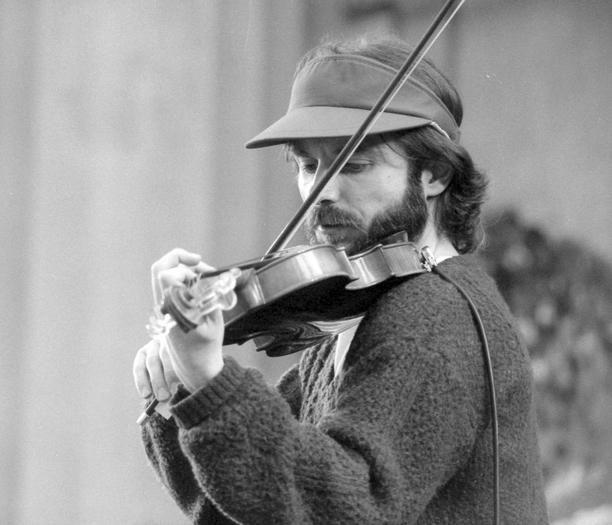
Jean-Luc Ponty at Berkeley Jazz Festival 1982

In 1969, Frank Zappa composed the music for Ponty's solo album King Kong: Jean-Luc Ponty Plays the Music of Frank Zappa (World Pacific, 1970). In 1972, Elton John invited Ponty to contribute to his Honky Chateau (1972) album. At the urging of Zappa and The Mothers of Invention, who wanted him to join their tour, Ponty emigrated with his wife and two young daughters to the United States and made his home in Los Angeles. He continued to work on a variety of projects – including two of John McLaughlin's Mahavishnu Orchestra albums Apocalypse (1974) and Visions of the Emerald Beyond (1975) and tours until 1975, when he signed with Atlantic.

For the next decade, Ponty toured the world repeatedly and recorded 12 consecutive albums, each of which reached the Billboard jazz charts top five, selling millions of albums. His early Atlantic recordings, such as 1976's Aurora and Imaginary Voyage, established Ponty as one of the leading figures in jazz-rock. He went on to crack the Top 40 with the album Enigmatic Ocean in 1977 and Cosmic Messenger in 1978. In 1984, a video of time-lapse images of New York City and Chicago was produced by Louis Schwarzberg for the song "Individual Choice" (1983).

Besides recording and touring with his own group, Ponty performed with the Pittsburgh New Music Ensemble, the Radio City Orchestra in New York, and symphony orchestras in Montreal, Toronto, Oklahoma City, and Tokyo. In the late 1980s he recorded the albums The Gift of Time (1987) and Storytelling (1989) for Columbia.

On Tchokola (Epic, 1991) Ponty combined acoustic and electric violins for the first time with polyrhythmic sounds of West Africa. He performed for two months in the U.S. and Canada with African expatriates he had met in Paris. In 1993, he returned to Atlantic with the album No Absolute Time. In 1995, he joined guitarist Al Di Meola and bassist Stanley Clarke to record an acoustic album, The Rite of Strings. That trio undertook a six-month tour of North America, South America, and Europe. He reunited his American band in 1996 for live performances following the release of a double album for Atlantic titled Le Voyage: The Jean-Luc Ponty Anthology. One of these concerts was recorded in Detroit, Michigan on June 29, 1996, and released in October 1996 by Atlantic under the title Live at Chene Park.

In 1997, Ponty reunited his group of Western and African musicians to pursue the fusion music he had begun to explore in 1991. They toured for three years from the Hawaiian Islands to Poland and in North America and Europe. Ponty performed a duet with bassist Miroslav Vitous in December 1999. In January 2000, he participated in Lalo Schifrin's recording Esperanto. In June 2001 he performed duets with Russian violinist Vadim Repin and at the Film Music Festival in Poland with American jazz violinist Regina Carter.

In August 2001, Ponty released his album Life Enigma on his label (J.L.P. Productions), a return to his concept from the 1970s with modern production. He played all the instruments on some tracks and was joined by band members for others. He gave a concert with his band in his native town of Avranches in Normandy on 21 September 2001. He was honored during a ceremony at City Hall. He then embarked on a tour in the U.S. in October and November 2001. In May 2001, he recorded a concert with the same musicians at the opera house in Dresden, Germany. That recording was released in July 2002 on Live at Semper Opera. In January 2003, he toured India for the first time, seven shows in six major cities for the Global Music Festival organized by Indian violinist L. Subramaniam.

Ponty performed on a reunion tour with Stanley Clarke and Al Di Meola from June to October 2004 in the U.S. and Canada. In 2005, he toured with Trio! with Stanley Clarke and Béla Fleck. In 2006, he reunited Jean-Luc Ponty & His Band and toured in the U.S., Chile, Venezuela, Western and Eastern Europe, Russia, The Middle East and India; they recorded a studio album called The Atacama Experience (2007) with guitarists Allan Holdsworth and Philip Catherine. In April 2012, Ponty performed in an acoustic trio with Clarke and guitarist Bireli Lagrene for the second set of a concert at the Chatelet Theatre in Paris to celebrate five decades in music. The first set featured Ponty with a string orchestra. In 2014, he recorded a jazz album entitled D-Stringz with Clarke and Lagrene. In March of 2014, Jon Anderson, the lead singer of Yes announced he was forming a new band with Jean Luc Ponty as the result of a mutual friend, Michael Lewis. The project was originally called Inventioning. In July of 2014, the band was formally introduced as the Anderson/Ponty Band.

== Work with Return to Forever ==
In 2011, Ponty was invited by bandleader/keyboardist Chick Corea to join the group Return to Forever for a series of concerts throughout that year. The group was labeled 'Return to Forever IV', as it is the fourth incarnation of the group. Ponty had first recorded with Corea on his 1976 solo album My Spanish Heart.

== Personal life ==
Ponty is married and has two daughters. One daughter, Clara Ponty, is a pianist and composer; Ponty has collaborated with Clara on several projects, including her third album, Mirror of Truth (2004).

== Discography ==
=== As leader ===
- Jazz Long Playing (Philips, 1964)
- Sunday Walk (SABA, 1967)
- Violin Summit with Stuff Smith, Stephane Grappelli, Svend Asmussen (SABA, 1967)
- As Trio HLP with Daniel Humair, Eddy Louiss (All Life, 1968 [1980])
- More Than Meets The Ear (World Pacific, 1968)
- Electric Connection (World Pacific, 1969)
- Live at Donte's (Blue Note/UA, 1969 [1981])
- Jean-Luc Ponty Experience with the George Duke Trio (World Pacific, 1969)
- King Kong: Jean-Luc Ponty Plays the Music of Frank Zappa (World Pacific, 1970)
- Astrorama [live] with Masahiko Sato (Far East/Toshiba EMI, 1970)
- New Violin Summit with Don "Sugar Cane" Harris, Michal Urbaniak (MPS/BASF, 1971)
- Open Strings (MPS/BASF, 1971)
- Live at Montreux 72 (Pierre Cardin, 1972)
- Ponty/Grappelli with Stephane Grappelli (America, 1973)
- Jean-Luc Ponty Meets Giorgio Gaslini (Pausa, 1973 [1976])
- Upon the Wings of Music (Atlantic, 1975)
- Aurora (Atlantic, 1976)
- Cantaloupe Island (Blue Note/UA, 1976)
- Imaginary Voyage (Atlantic, 1976)
- Enigmatic Ocean (Atlantic, 1977)
- Cosmic Messenger (Atlantic, 1978)
- Live (Atlantic, 1979)
- A Taste for Passion (Atlantic, 1979)
- Civilized Evil (Atlantic, 1980)
- Mystical Adventures (Atlantic, 1982)
- Individual Choice (Atlantic, 1983)
- Open Mind (Atlantic, 1984)
- Fables (Atlantic, 1985)
- The Gift of Time (Columbia, 1987)
- Storytelling (Columbia, 1989)
- Puss in Boots with Tracey Ullman (Rabbit Ears/BMG Kidz, 1991)
- Tchokola (Epic, 1991)
- Volume 1 with Daniel Humair, Eddy Louiss (Dreyfus, 1991)
- Volume 2 with Daniel Humair, Eddy Louiss (Dreyfus, 1991)
- No Absolute Time (Atlantic, 1993)
- The Rite of Strings with Stanley Clarke, Al Di Meola (Gai Saber/I.R.S., 1995)
- Live at Chene Park (Atlantic, 1996)
- Life Enigma (J.L.P. Productions, 2001)
- Live at Semper Opera (Le Chant Du Monde, 2002)
- Jean-Luc Ponty in Concert (Le Chant Du Monde, 2003)
- The Atacama Experience (Koch, 2007)
- D-Stringz with Stanley Clarke, Bireli Lagrene (Impulse!, 2015)
- Better Late Than Never with Jon Anderson (Ear Music, 2015)

=== As sideman ===
With Chick Corea

- My Spanish Heart (Polydor, 1976)
- Chick Corea (Polydor, 1987)
- Music Forever & Beyond (GRP, 1996)
- Forever (Concord, 2011)

With Mahavishnu Orchestra

- Apocalypse (Columbia, 1974)
- Visions of the Emerald Beyond (Columbia, 1975)
- The Mahavishnu Orchestra & John McLaughlin (Amiga, 1979)

With Frank Zappa

- Hot Rats (Bizarre/Reprise, 1969)
- The Mothers, Over-Nite Sensation (Discreet/Reprise, 1973)
- Apostrophe (Discreet/Reprise, 1974)
- Shut Up 'n Play Yer Guitar (Barking Pumpkin, 1981)
- You Can't Do That On Stage Anymore Vol. 6 (Rykodisc, 1992)
- The Lost Episodes (Rykodisc, 1996)
- One Shot Deal (Zappa Records, 2008)
- Road Tapes, Venue 2 (Vaulternative, 2013)
- The Crux Of The Biscuit (Zappa Records, 2016)

With others

- Inventioning, Some People (Michael Lewis/Blue Street Artists, 2021)
- Jon Anderson, 1000 Hands: Chapter One (Opio Media, 2019)
- Sam Bush, Laps in Seven (Sugar Hill, 2006)
- Michel Colombier, Wings (A&M 1971)
- Wolfgang Dauner, Free Action (SABA, 1967)
- George Duke, Night After Night (Elektra, 1989)
- Serge Gainsbourg, Histoire De Melody Nelson (Light in the Attic, 2009)
- George Gruntz, Barock Sex & Jazz-Sechs (Electrola, 1966)
- George Gruntz, Noon in Tunisia (SABA, 1967)
- Andre Hodeir, Anna Livia Plurabelle (Philips, 1966)
- Elton John, Honky Chateau (UNI, 1972)
- Jeff Lorber, Hacienda (Heads Up, 2013)
- Clara Ponty, Mirror of Truth (Eden, 2005)
- Clara Ponty, Into the Light (Le Chant Du Monde, 2010)
- Return to Forever, The Mothership Returns (Eagle 2012)
- Lalo Schifrin, Esperanto (Aleph, 2000)
- Alan Sorrenti, Aria (Harvest, 1972)
- Gerald Wilson, Eternal Equinox (World Pacific, 1969)

== Films ==
- 1999: L. Subramaniam: Violin from the Heart (Directed by Jean Henri Meunier; includes a scene with Ponty and L. Subramaniam performing together)
