= Corinthia Grand Hotel Astoria Brussels =

Hotel in Brussels, Belgium

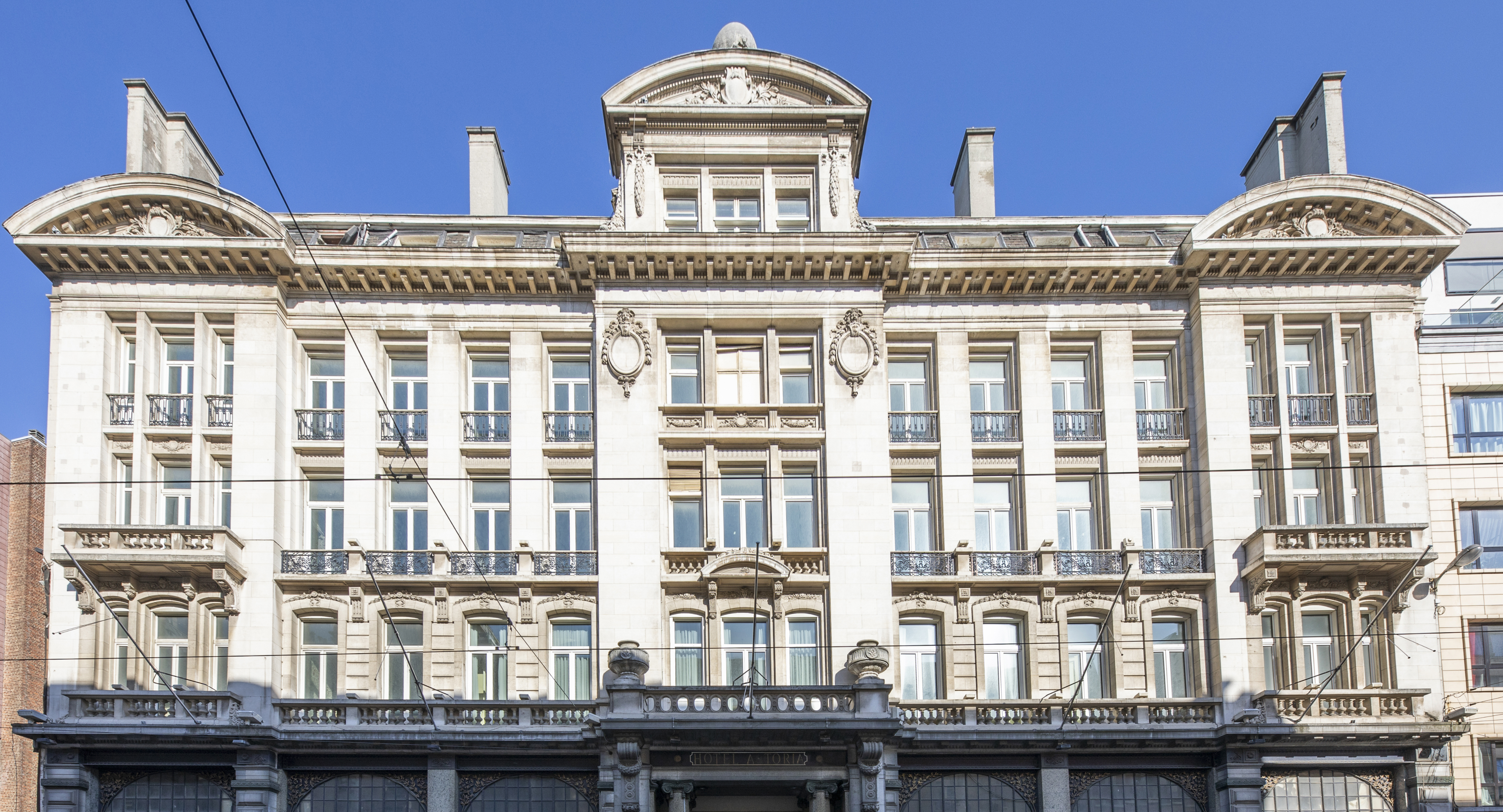
- The Corinthia Grand Hotel Astoria Brussels seen from the Rue Royale/Koningsstraat
- Former names: Hotel Astoria
- Alternative names: Grand Hotel Astoria, Corinthia Brussels
- Hotel chain: Corinthia Hotels International

General information
- Type: Hotel
- Architectural style: Eclectic; Beaux-Arts
- Location: Rue Royale / Koningsstraat 101–103, 1000 City of Brussels, Brussels-Capital Region, Belgium
- Coordinates: 50°51′4″N 4°21′54″E
- Opening: 1910 (116 years ago); 2024 (2 years ago)
- Closed: 2007 (original)

Design and construction
- Architect: Henri Van Dievoet
- Designations: Protected (21/09/2000)

Other information
- Number of rooms: 126
- Facilities: Gastronomic restaurant, Belgian Brasserie, Spa, Bar, Palm Court lounge, Retail space
- Public transit: Brussels-Congress; 1 5 Parc/Park and 2 6 Botanique/Kruidtuin

Website
- www.corinthia.com/brussels

The Corinthia Grand Hotel Astoria Brussels is a historic five-star luxury hotel in the Freedom Quarter of Brussels, Belgium. Built in 1909 as the Hotel Astoria for the Brussels International Exposition of 1910, in a true Parisian spirit, the hotel's Louis XVI façade and majestic interior lend it a distinctly aristocratic appearance. It is considered among the finest luxury hotels in the world, and has served as a meeting place for statesmen, artists and other personalities. The hotel closed for renovation in 2007 and reopened in December 2024.

The hotel is located at 101–103, rue Royale/Koningsstraat, not far from the Congress Column and Brussels Park.

== History ==
=== Origins and early history ===
The Hotel Astoria was built in 1909 in preparation for the Brussels International Exposition of 1910, at the request of King Leopold II, to accommodate visitors to the event. It replaced the former Hotel Mengelle, a neoclassical complex designed in the second quarter of the 19th century by the architect Tilman-François Suys. The original establishment, which had developed a reputation as a family-run hotel, had become too small to meet the growing demand for luxury accommodation in Brussels. The new hotel was commissioned by the Devillers-Mengelle family and designed by Henri Van Dievoet, a nephew of the architect Joseph Poelaert, in an eclectic Beaux-Arts style, mixing borrowings from the Louis XV and Louis XVI styles. The laying of the first stone took place in 1909, and the hotel opened in 1910, just in time for the International Exposition.

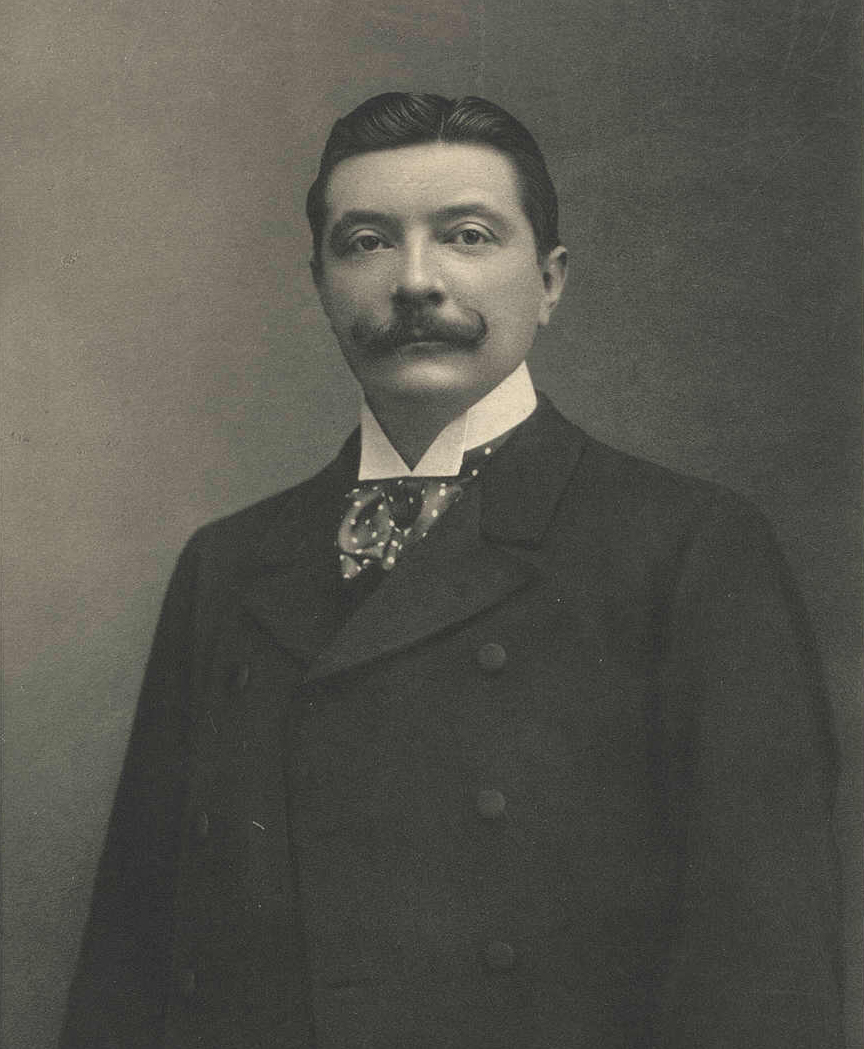
The Hotel Astoria's architect, Henri Van Dievoet

One of the three most famous hotels in Brussels during the Belle Époque—together with the Grand Hotel on the Boulevard Anspach/Anspachlaan (currently destroyed) and the Hotel Métropole on the Place de Brouckère/De Brouckèreplein—the Hotel Astoria belonged to the category of large European hotels of the time. Van Dievoet furnished the hotel's original 108 rooms in the Louis XV style, with luxurious amenities such as hot water and electric chandeliers. After the First World War, the hotel resumed its activities under the management of Georges Marquet, who went on to create many luxurious hotels across Europe.

The Hotel Astoria in the early 20th century

From 1975, the hotel hosted the Astoria Concerts, a series of Sunday morning chamber music performances. For the wedding of then-Prince Philippe and Princess Mathilde in 1999, King Albert II and Queen Paola organised a grand reception at the hotel. Also in 1999, the hotel underwent a partial renovation as a property managed by Accor. Two years later, it was also there that then-Prime Minister Guy Verhofstadt and Minister Johan Vande Lanotte concluded an agreement with Swissair about the fate of Belgium's national airline, Sabena, in secrecy. On 21 September 2000, the hotel was listed as a protected monument by the Monuments and Sites Directorate of the Brussels-Capital Region.

=== Closure, renovation and reopening ===
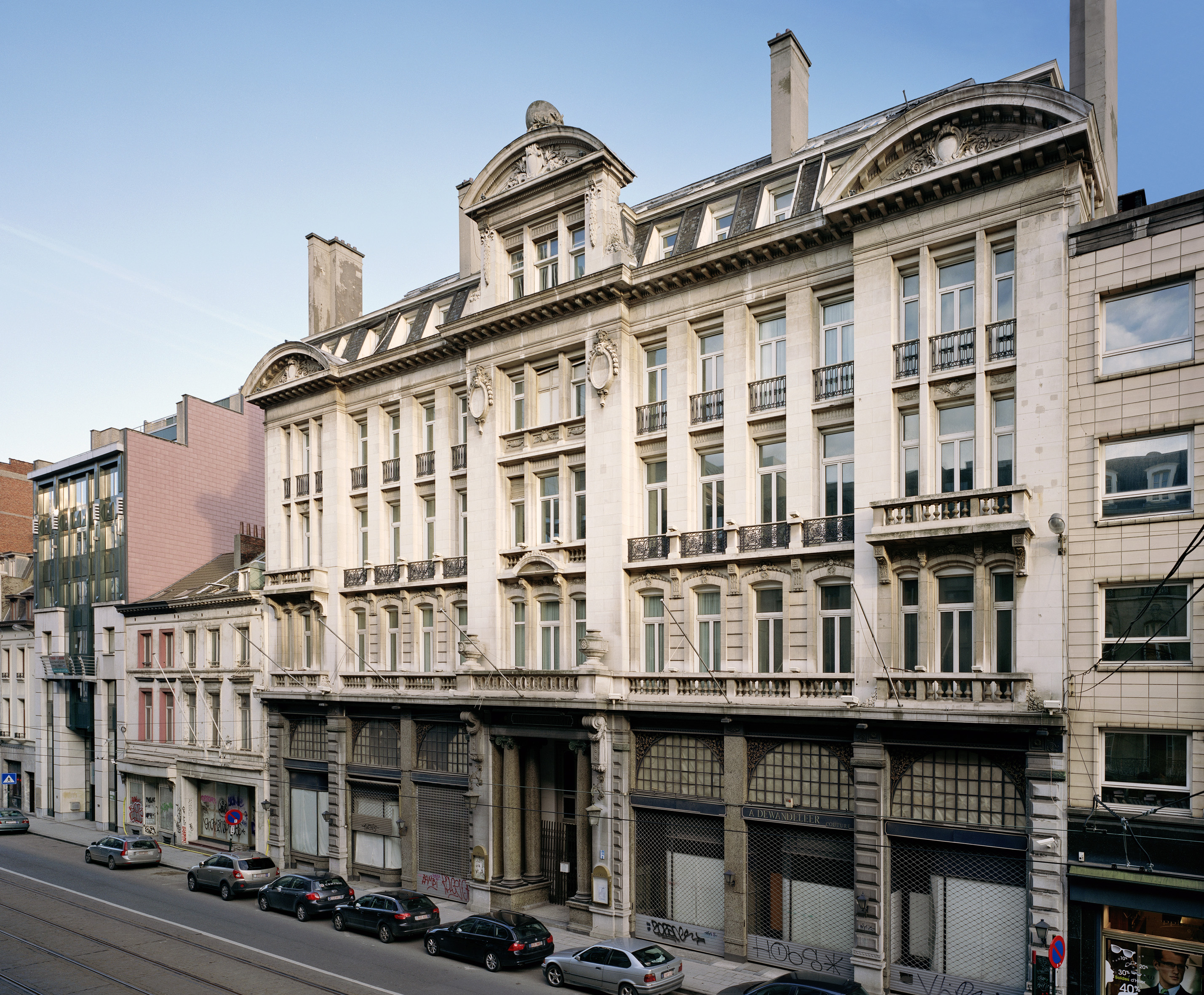
The Hotel Astoria in 2011, before renovation

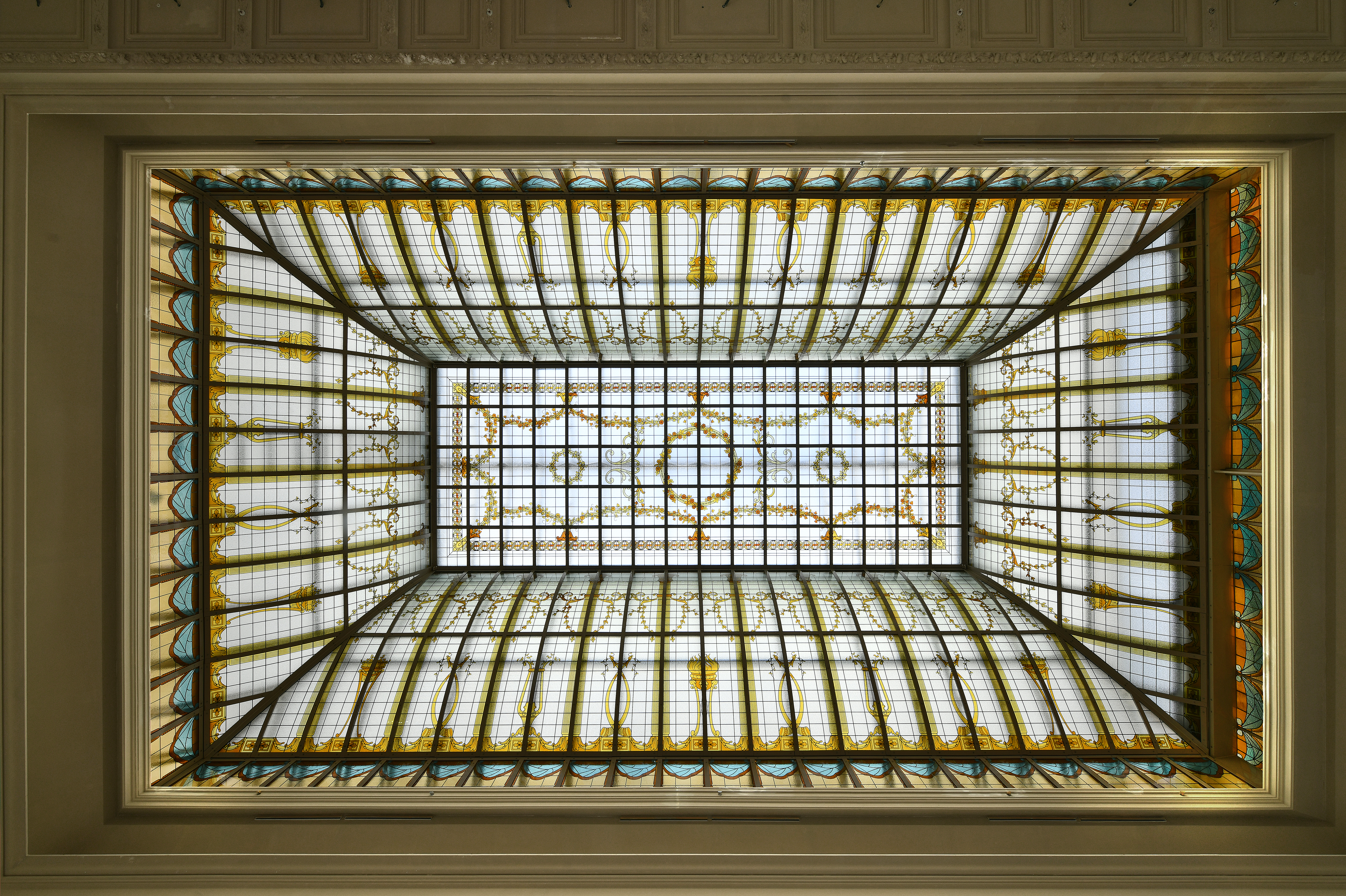
The reconstructed glass roof

By the early 21st century, the building no longer met the requirements of the contemporary luxury hotel market. In 2007, the hotel ceased its operation as a Sofitel-branded business, closed, and was sold to Global Hotels & Resorts, owned by the Saudi Arabian Sheikh Mohamed El-Khereji. The architect Francis Metzger, from the architectural office MA² - Metzger et Associés Architecture, was appointed to lead the renovation and restoration of its historic façade and interiors, as well as its extension into five adjacent buildings (one of them was demolished in 2010 to make way for a new hotel wing). However, the project encountered substantial delays and the hotel remained vacant for several years.

The property was acquired by the Maltese group Corinthia Hotels in 2016. The restoration work resumed under the direction of Francis Metzger and a team composed of the architects Monica Marteaux and Frédéric Huwaert; it was completed in 2023. Particular attention was given to the Palm Court, the hotel's central lounge, where the two-storey-high, 15-metre-long (49 ft) glass roof, which disappeared after 1947 because of watertightness issues, was reconstructed with the help of period photographs, and is again adorned with its original coloured and painted stained glass. The Waldorf Room, where banquets were held, was also restored.

The hotel reopened under the name Corinthia Grand Hotel Astoria Brussels on 9 December 2024. The restaurants are also open to the public and the other accommodations will officially become available in April 2025.

== Building and amenities ==
Before restoration, the hotel had 118 rooms. With its new configuration, it now offers 126 rooms, including 31 suites and five signature suites. The establishment also houses Corinthia Spa by Sisley, a 1,200 m^{2} (13,000 sq ft) spa and wellness centre; expanded modular meeting rooms complete with technological equipment; a Palm Court lounge; Under the stairs, a bar created by the mixologist Hannah Van Ongevalle; Palais Royal, a gourmet restaurant by the Michelin-starred chef David Martin; Le Petit bon bon, a gourmet brasserie by the chef Christophe Hardiquest; Coutume, a concept store of Belgian luxury brands; as well as a private members' club.

== Famous guests ==
The hotel has become a mythical place in Brussels. For a century, it has been the meeting place for the rich and the famous. In the guestbook, many personalities can be found: heads of state and prime ministers like Adenauer, Ben-Gurion, Churchill, Eisenhower, Edward Heath, Édouard Herriot, Hirohito and the Shah; artists like Dalí; writers like James Joyce and Marguerite Yourcenar; actors like Pierre Fresnay and Gérard Philippe; singers like Maurice Chevalier; and musicians like Khachaturian, Menuhin, Oistrakh and Rubinstein.

== See also ==
- Lists of hotels
- Hotel Le Plaza, Brussels
- Hotel Métropole, Brussels
- History of Brussels
- Belgium in the long nineteenth century
