= Palace Hotel Madrid =

The Palace Hotel Madrid
- Hotel Palace (Spanish)
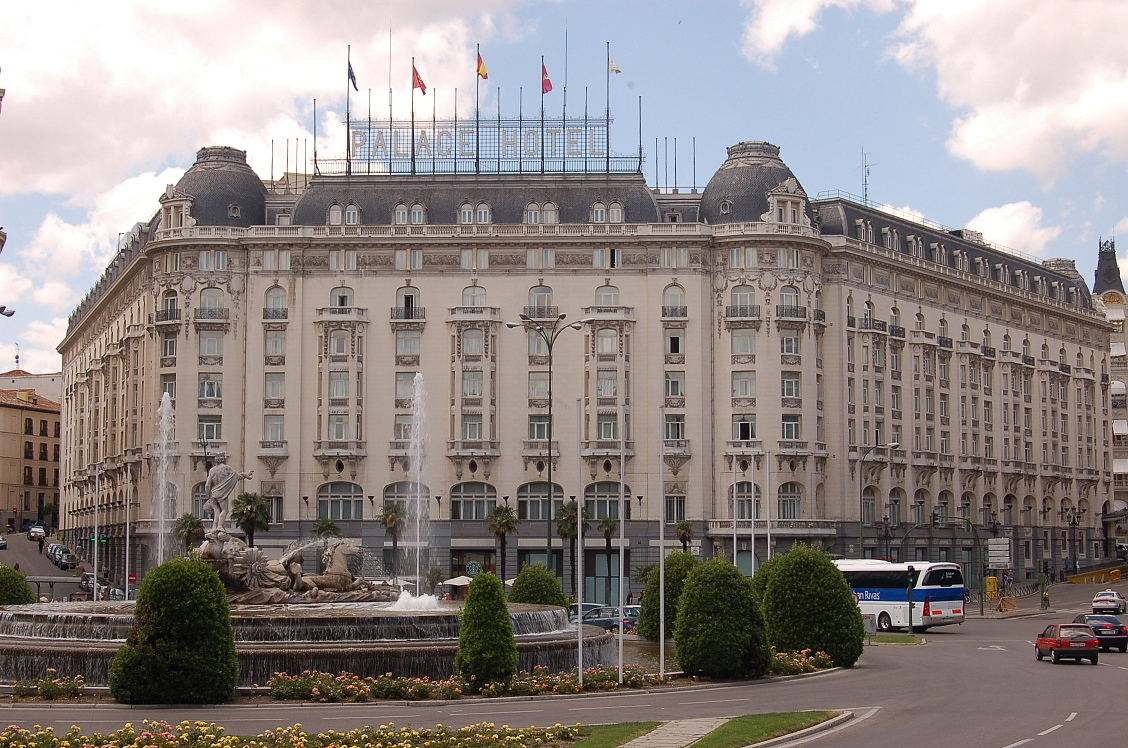

- Location within Spain
- 40.415486°N 3.696133°W
- Location: Madrid, Spain

History
- Built: 1912

Site notes
- Area: Centro
- Architect: Leon Eduard Ferrés i Puig
- Architectural style: Art Nouveau

Spanish Cultural Heritage
- Official name: Hotel Palace
- Type: Non-movable
- Criteria: Monument
- Designated: 1999
- Reference no.: RI-51-0010459

The Palace Hotel Madrid (Spanish: Hotel Palace) is a historic luxury hotel located in the Centro neighborhood of Madrid, Spain.

== History ==
The Palace Hotel was developed by Belgian entrepreneur Georges Marquet by personal suggestion of King Alfonso XIII. Designed by the Monnoyer Studio and architect Leon Eduard Ferrés i Puig, It celebrated its grand opening on October 12, 1912.

The Palace was the first hotel in Spain (and only the second in the world) to have a bathroom in each guest room. It was also the first hotel in Spain to have a telephone in each room. Notable guests of the hotel during its first few decades were Igor Stravinsky, Pablo Picasso, Marie Curie, Mata Hari, Josephine Baker, Buster Keaton, Richard Strauss, Federico García Lorca, Luis Buñuel and Salvador Dalí. During the Spanish Civil War from 1936-9, the hotel became a military hospital. The famous glass-domed lounge was used as an operating theatre, due to the abundant natural light. After the war, the hotel was restored in 1939 at a cost of four million Pesetas.

After World War II, the Palace welcomed such guests as Ernest Hemingway, Orson Welles, Lauren Bacall, Rita Hayworth, Ava Gardner, and the Duke and Duchess of Windsor.

Georges Marquet's heirs sold the Palace to Spanish businessman Enrique Maso in 1977. During the February 23, 1981 coup, the hotel's general manager's office was taken over by members of the interim government, while over 200 international journalists filled the hotel. The Spanish Socialist Workers' Party celebrated their landslide victory in the 1982 elections in the hotel. Maso sold the hotel in 1989 to CIGA hotels, an Italian luxury chain owned by the Aga Khan. The hotel hosted participants in the Madrid Conference of 1991 between Israel and the Palestinians.

ITT Sheraton purchased CIGA in 1995, and placed the hotel in its ITT Sheraton Luxury Collection. Starwood Hotels purchased Sheraton in 1997, and made The Luxury Collection into a separate brand. The hotel was declared Bien de Interés Cultural in 1999. Starwood moved the hotel to its Westin Hotels division on March 1, 2000, renaming the property The Westin Palace Madrid. In 2005, Starwood sold the hotel to Host Marriott as part of a package of 38 international hotel properties, for $4.1 billion. In 2006, the hotel property was sold to Archer Hotel Capital, an investment group owned jointly by Singapore-based GIC Real Estate and Dutch pension investment company APG.

The new owners of the hotel began gradually renovating its guest rooms floor by floor in 2008 and started major renovations of the public areas in June 2023. On March 1, 2024, Archer Hotel Management assumed direct operation of the hotel. At the conclusion of the renovation work, on March 14, 2025, the hotel was transferred from Marriott's Westin brand back to The Luxury Collection brand and renamed The Palace, a Luxury Collection Hotel, Madrid.
