= Oscar Michiels =

Belgian army officer

Lieutenant-General Oscar Michiels
- Born: 24 July 1881; Brussels, Belgium
- Died: 14 June 1946 (aged 64); Brussels, Belgium
- Military career
- Allegiance: Belgium
- Branch: Belgian Army
- Service years: 1897–1945
- Rank: Lieutenant general
- Commands: Chief of the General Staff of the Belgian Army
- Conflicts: World War I; German invasion of Belgium; World War II; Battle of Belgium
- Awards: Croix de Guerre (1915); Commander of the Legion of Honour

François-Fidèle-Oscar Michiels (24 July 1881 – 14 June 1946) was a Belgian military officer who served in World War I and World War II.

== Biography ==
Oscar Michiels was born in central Brussels on 24 July 1881. He enrolled in a military school aged 11. Three years later he attended cadet school in Namur, graduating in 1897 as a corporal. After being promoted to sergeant, he returned to the school in 1901. Finishing two years later, he was made a lieutenant.

In 1913 Michiels was stationed at the fortified position of Liège. On 1 August 1914 he was attached to the staff of the Third Division, where he would remain for the duration of World War I. Following the Battle of the Yser Michiels was promoted to the rank of captain. In September 1915 he was moved to the front lines, but was injured several weeks later in an accident and returned to the Third Division's headquarters. In November he became captain-commandant. On 20 July 1917 he was awarded the Croix de guerre. Following a successful operation at Merkem in April 1918, Michiels was made a Commander of the Legion of Honour by Ferdinand Foch.

In March 1919 Michiels became a professor at the Instruction Center of Staff (later the War College, part of the Royal Military Academy), where he would work for nearly 12 years. As a major, he would privately instruct Prince (later King) Leopold III on war studies. In 1927 Michiels was due to be transferred out of the school and given command of a battalion, but his commanding officer objected. He left his position at the college as a lieutenant colonel in June 1931 and became chief of staff of the First Army Corps. In March of the following year he was made colonel. Two years later he was made commander of the First Grenadiers Regiment. In June 1937 Michiels was promoted to major general and made head of the personnel department of the Defence Ministry.

Following the outbreak of World War II in September 1939, Michiels took command of the 7th Infantry Division to oversee its mobilization. This division was soon assigned the task of improving the defensive line along the Dyle. After several weeks, it was moved to protect the Albert Canal. Michiels was appointed King Leopold III's chief of staff on 2 February 1940. He subsequently served in this capacity during the Battle of Belgium. During the Belgian Army's last stand at the Battle of the Lys on 27 May, Michiels suggested that the king send a representative to the Germans to negotiate a ceasefire. King Leopold III followed this advice, and eventually agreed to surrender to the Germans the following morning. British Admiral Roger Keyes commended Michiels for his display of high morale during the campaign.

On 30 May, Michiels gave a speech to all the senior Belgian officers, thanking them for their service. He asked the army staff to remain with him to assist in managing the confused state of affairs following the capitulation. The Germans inquired him on Belgium's observance of neutrality before the invasion and on the Mechelen incident, but he refused to offer them any answers. Michiels was then taken prisoner by the Germans. He was deported with the army staff to prisoner of war camps in central Europe. The Germans offered to return him to Belgium in 1943 and hand him control of the National Office of Veterans Affairs, but he refused on the account that he would be leaving his subordinates behind. He was liberated from a camp near Prenzlau by the Red Army on 7 May 1945.

Repatriated, Michiels retired from the army in late 1945 and began writing a book on the Battle of Belgium. Michiels died on 14 June 1946 and was buried with full military honors. His book, 18 jours de guerre en Belgique, was published posthumously the following year.
