= Henri Van Dievoet =

Belgian architect (1869–1931)

Henri van Dievoet
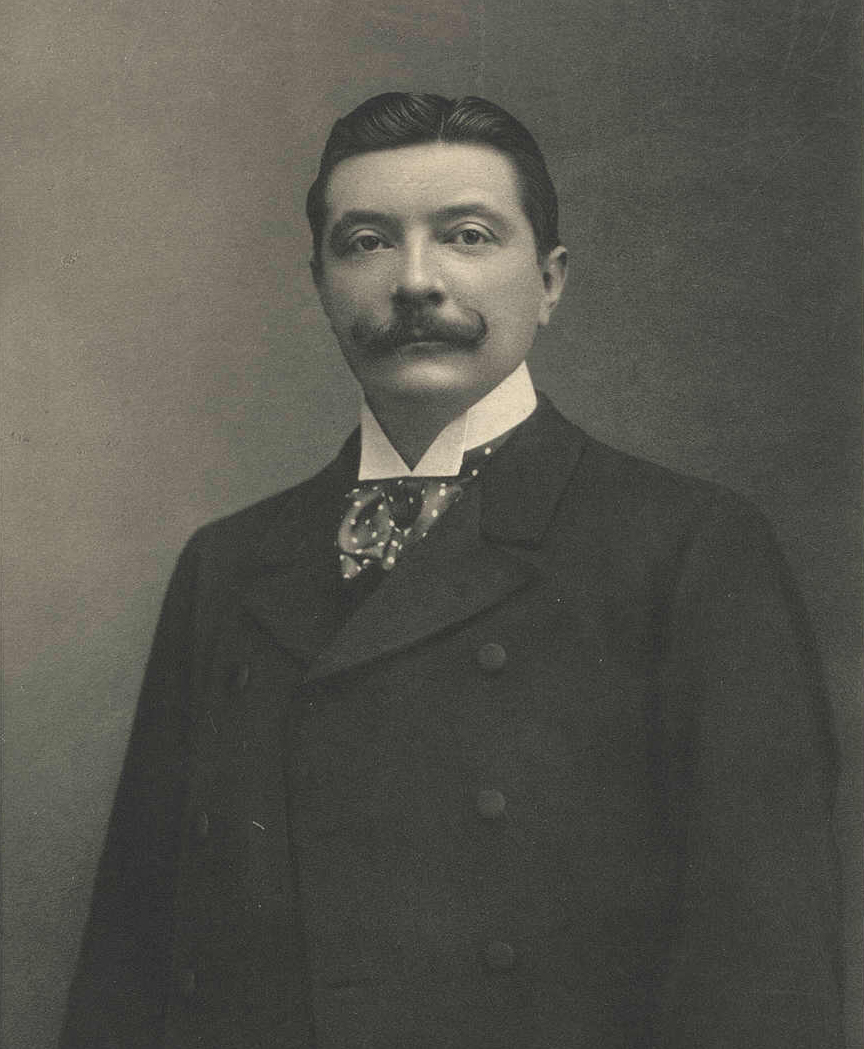
- Henri van Dievoet, 1908
- Born: Henri Joseph Léon Van Dievoet; 19 January 1869; Brussels
- Died: 24 April 1931 (aged 62)
- Education: Académie Royale des Beaux-Arts
- Occupation: Architect
- Known for: Hotel Astoria, Royal Military Academy
- Family: Van Dievoet family

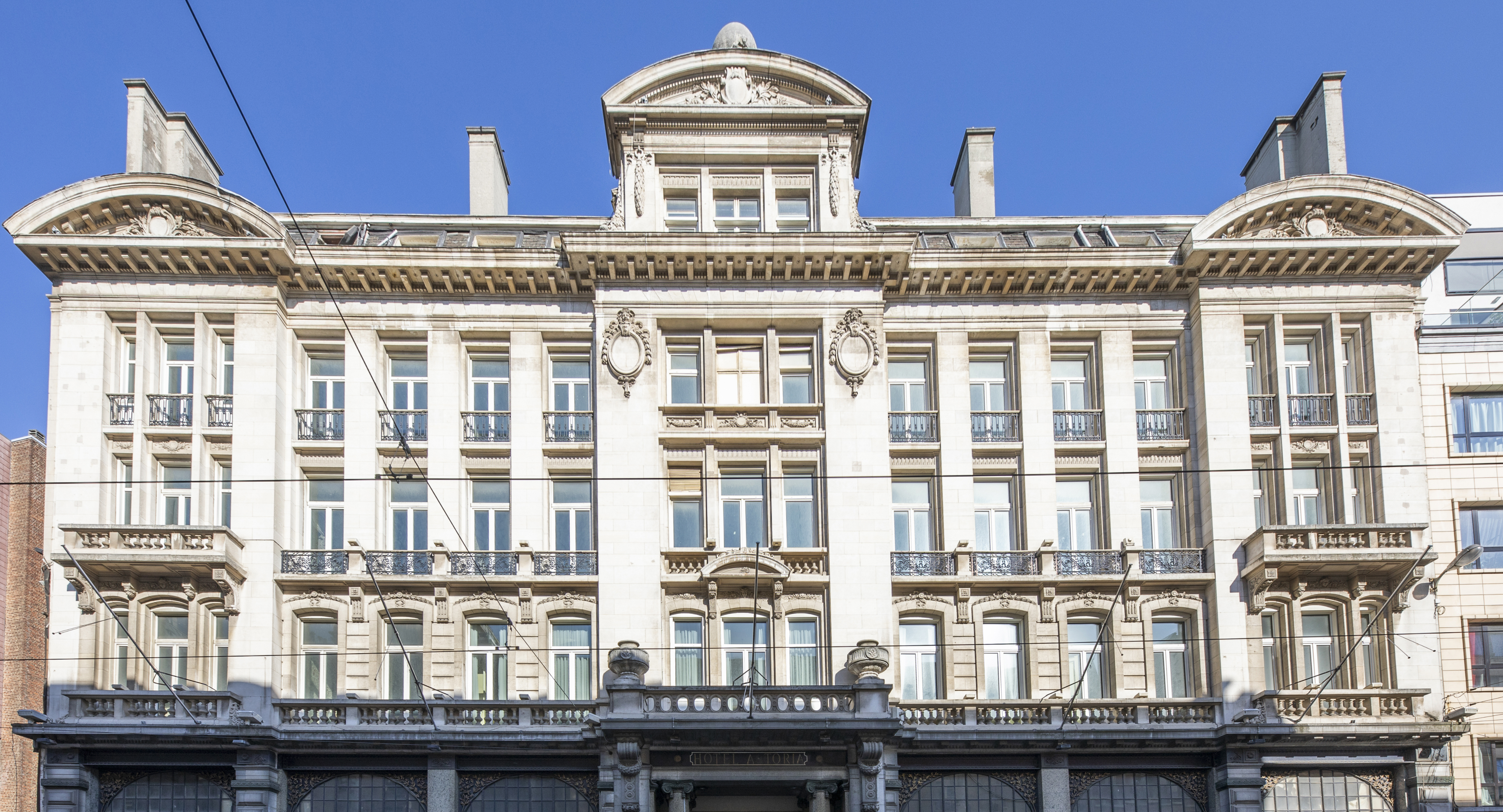
Hotel Astoria by Henri Van Dievoet

Henri van Dievoet (/ˈdiːvʊt/, 19 January 1869 – 24 April 1931) was a Belgian architect.

== Biography ==
=== Early life ===
Van Dievoet was born into an old family of Brussels descended from the Sweerts lineage, one of the Seven Noble Houses of Brussels, which had already shone in the fine arts at the time of Louis XIV. His great-granduncles were the goldsmith Philippe Van Dievoet and the sculptor Peter Van Dievoet, one of the creators of the Grand-Place of Brussels. Joseph Poelaert was his great-uncle.

=== Education ===
Henri Van Dievoet enrolled at the Académie Royale des Beaux-Arts on 1 August 1884 and took courses there until 1892. He was a brilliant student and distinguished himself by received numerous awards: the geometry award, the perspective award, the construction award, the archaeology award, the art history award, the hygiene award, the jurisprudence award, and the architecture history award.

He also received a formation by architect Ernest Acker, who would eventually be a witness at his wedding.

=== His architectural work ===
His first house (1889) was the house and artist's studio built for stockbroker Félix Rodberg, 30 rue Washington in Ixelles.

In 1890, he participated in the Salon d' Architecture de l'Exposition des Beaux-Arts de Bruxelles alongside his friend Victor Horta and Maurice Van Ysendijck.

In 1894, he won the Grand Prix d'architecture of the City of Brussels for his project "House of Parliament for a constitutional country".

He also won the Prix de Rome.

In 1901, he conceived a series of buildings with apartments on rue Campenhout in Brussels. Other works include a house and artist's studio built for stockbroker Félix Rodberg in rue Washington (1889); the Evangelical Church in Haine Saint Paul Jolimont (1890); four houses on the rue General Patton (1895); the Royal Military Academy on the avenue de la Renaissance, with fellow architect Henri Maquet (1908); and the Hotel Astoria, rue Royale (1909).

Among his disciples appears Joseph Van Neck, who worked as draftsman in his workshop.

=== Positions held ===
He was for many years the secretary of the Central Société of Architecture of Brussels.

Starting in 1910, he was professor at the Académie Royale des Beaux-Arts in Brussels.

From 1924 to 1931, From 1924 to 1931 he taught architectural drawing and perspective at the Academy of Fine Arts in Saint Gilles.

Henri van Dievoet picture gallery
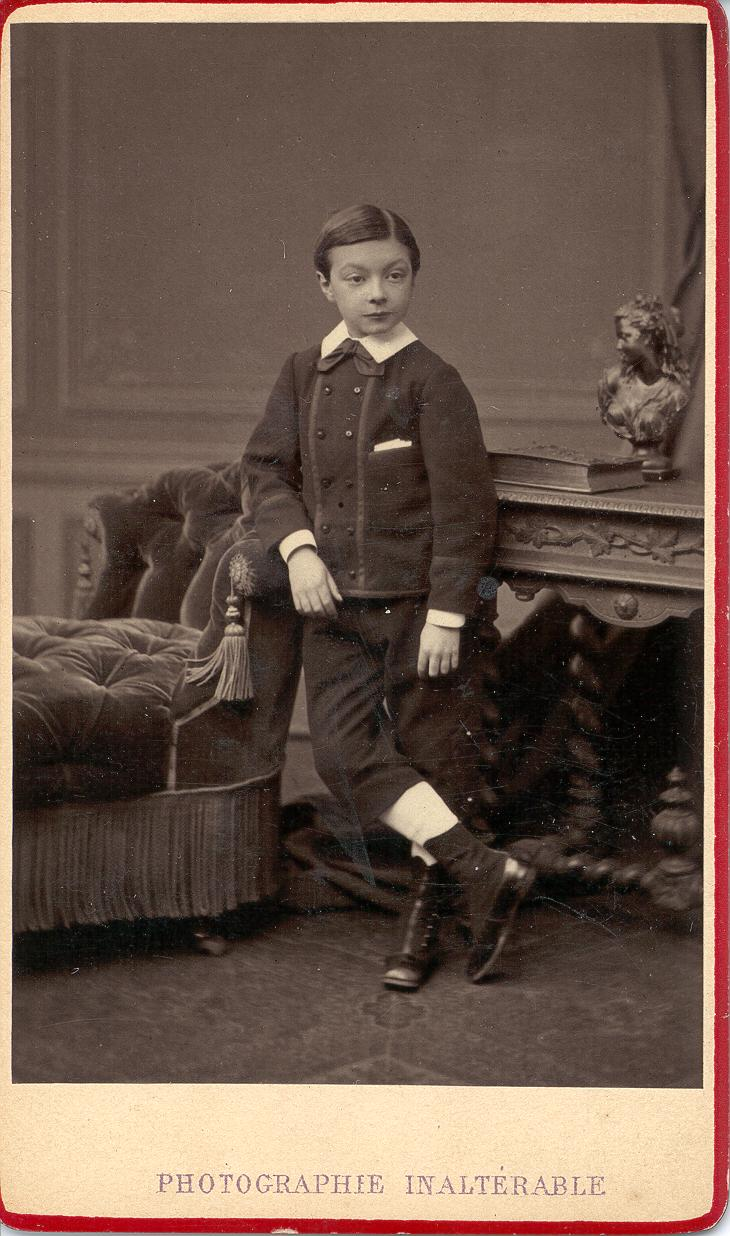
Henri van Dievoet as a child, by Géruzet of Brussels

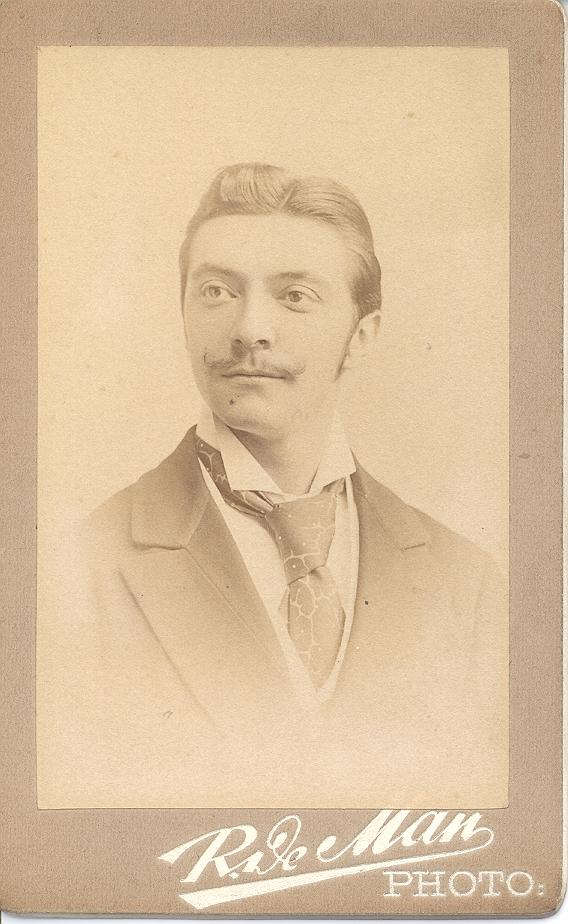
Henri van Dievoet, c. 1896. Photo by R. De Man

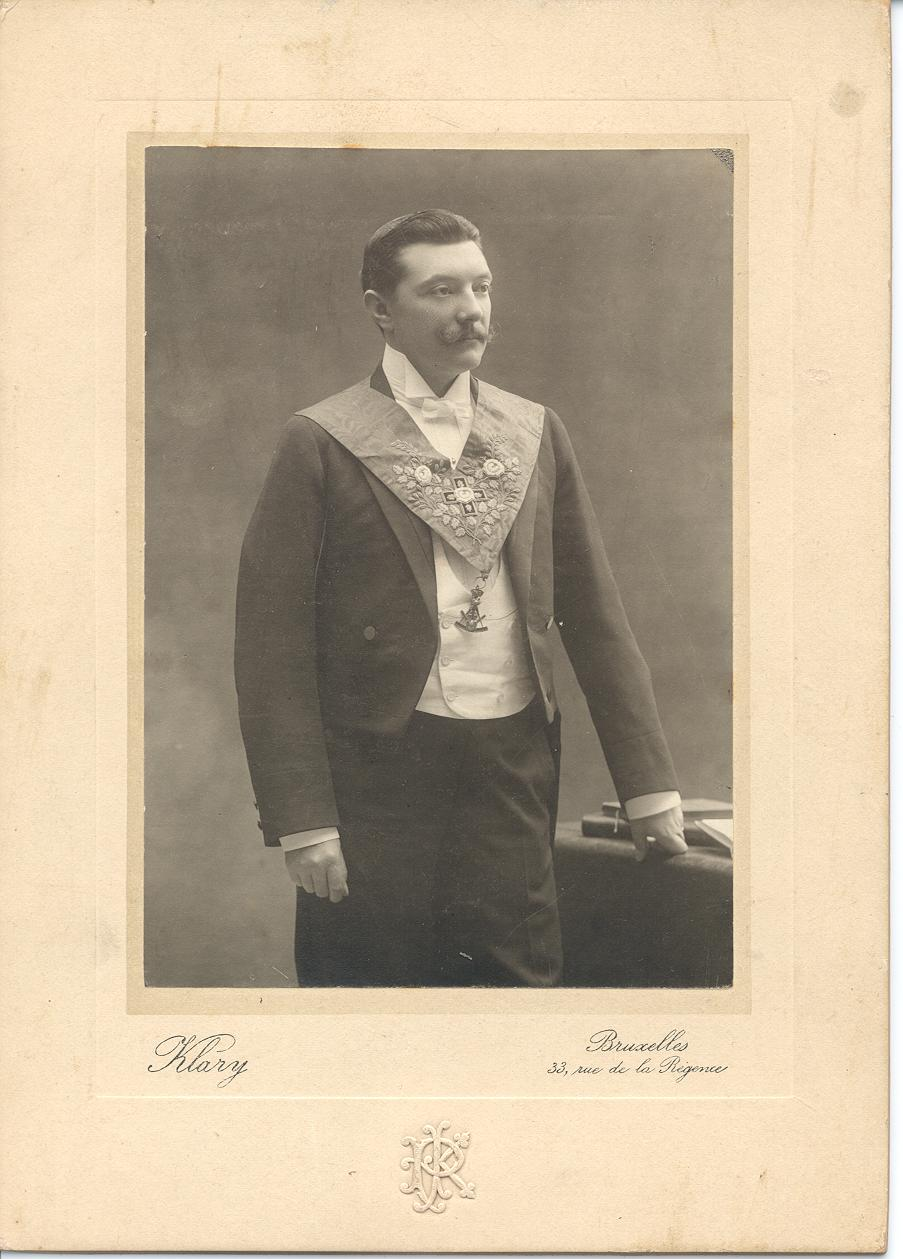
The architect Henri van Dievoet as a freemason

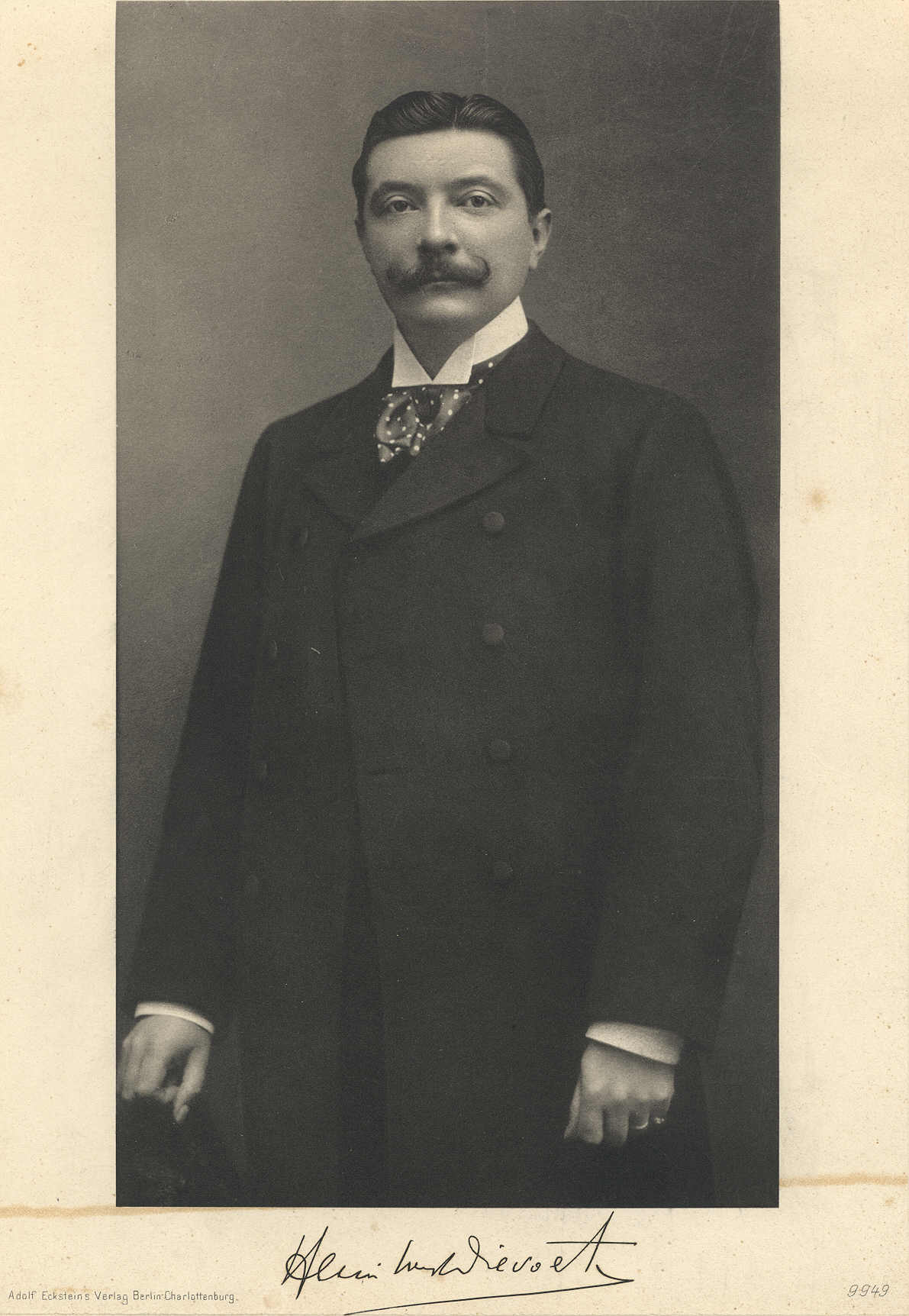
Portrait of Henri van Dievoet circa 1908

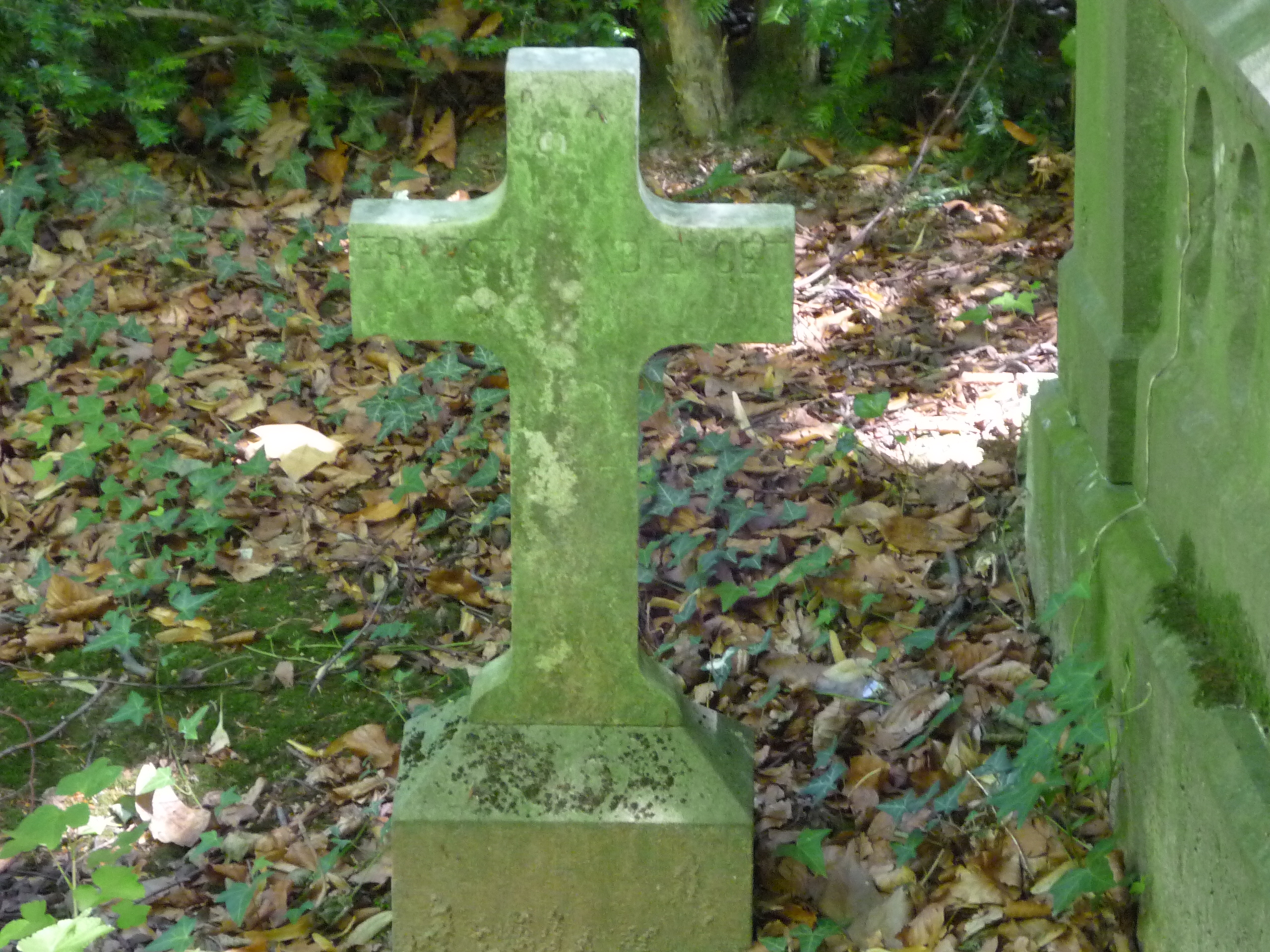
Henri van Dievoet's tomb in the Brussels Cemetery (Grande allée centrale, n°218)

== End of his life ==
Henri van Dievoet died at the Brugmann Hospital, and, according to his wishes, only his close friends and family were present, among whom was his friend Victor Horta. His burial took place in Brussels Cemetery in Evere. He is buried in the large central alley, n° 218, under a simple cross.

== His work ==
His work marks the urban landscape of Brussels :

- House and artist's studio built for stockbroker Félix Rodberg, 28 and 30 rue Washington in Ixelles. This workshop was rented by Félix Rodberg to several artists.
- Protestant Temple of Haine-Saint-Paul-Jolimont, rue Henri Aubry, dedicated 1 November 1890.
- Hotel Astoria (1909), rue Royale, 103. built for the Brussels International Expo (1910)
- Firm of Muds, quay de Willebroeck, 22.
- Arsenal of Cartage, boulevard Louis Schmidt, 1–29.
- Royal Military Academy, avenue de la Renaissance, 30, in collaboration with Henri Maquet.
- Diamond Deluxe Hotel, (the future Aegidium), heightening of part of the Moorish room, in Saint-Gilles (Brussels).
- The hotel De Leeuw, in 1897, decorated with Sgraffite (" Maronniers") by his brother Gabriel van Dievoet
- Houses on the boulevard General Jacques
- Villas in Watermael-Boitsfort on the periphery of Brussels
- Monument of Leon Rodberg (1832–1888), of Art nouveau style in the Cimetière of Robermont.
- In Hasselt, he drew the designs of the National Bank.

== Writings ==
- "Exposure of work of the pupils of the Co-educational school of drawing and industry of Schaerbeek", in the Emulation, Brussels, 1893, E. Lyon-Claesen, pp. 152 to 154.
- "Applied Art to the Artistic Circle", in the Chronicle of Public works and Finance, Brussels, 2 February 1896.
- "Decorative Art", in the Chronicle of Public works and Finance, Brussels, 7 June 1896.
- "Art with Ixelles", in the Chronicle of Public works and Finance, Brussels, 5 July 1896.
- "Obituary: Joseph Naert", in the Emulation, Brussels, 1910, n°11, pp. 83–84.

== Gallery of his architectural work ==
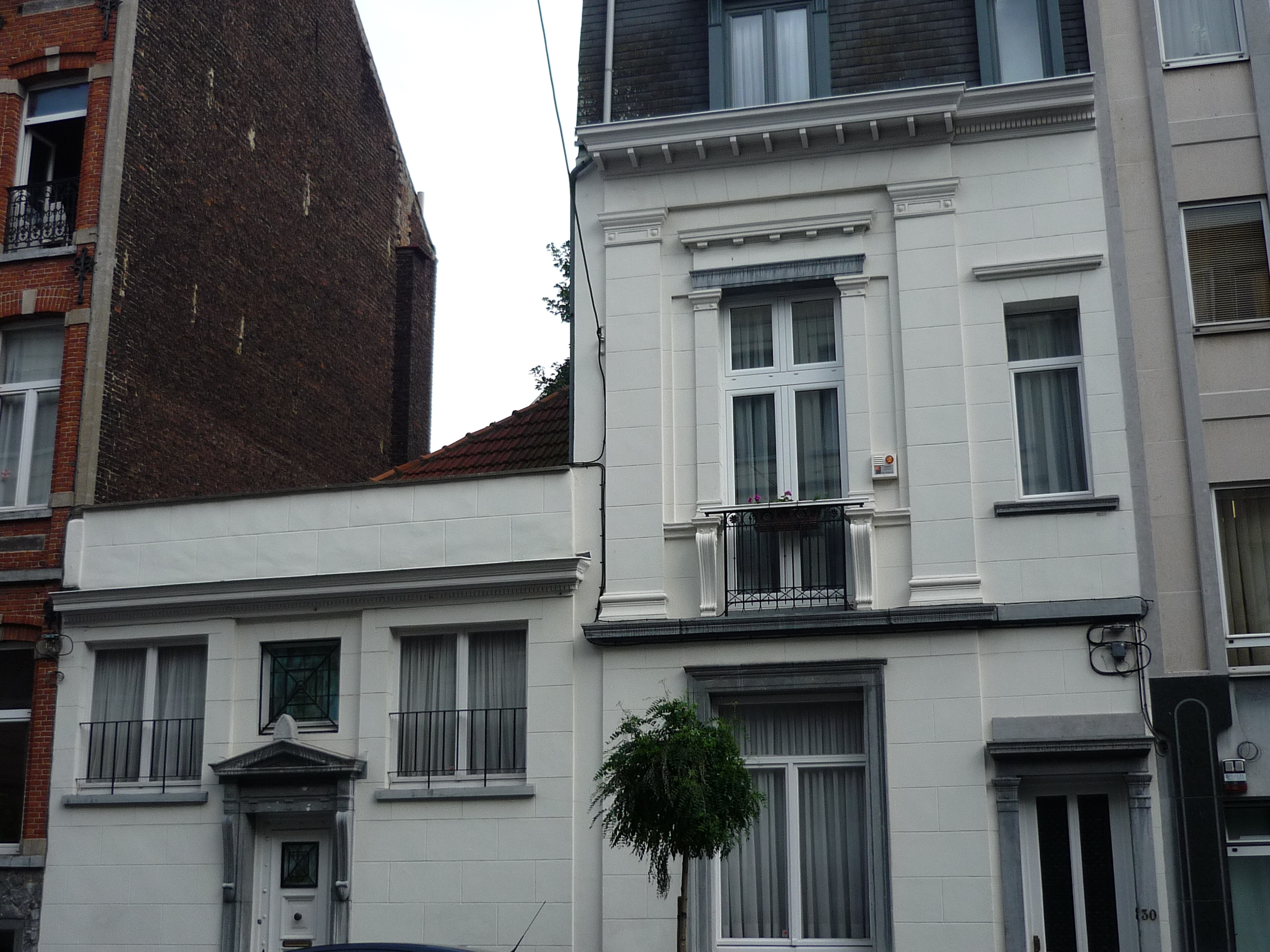
1889 - House and artist's studio built for stockbroker Félix Rodberg, 28 and 30 rue Washington in Ixelles. This workshop was rented by Félix Rodberg to several artists.

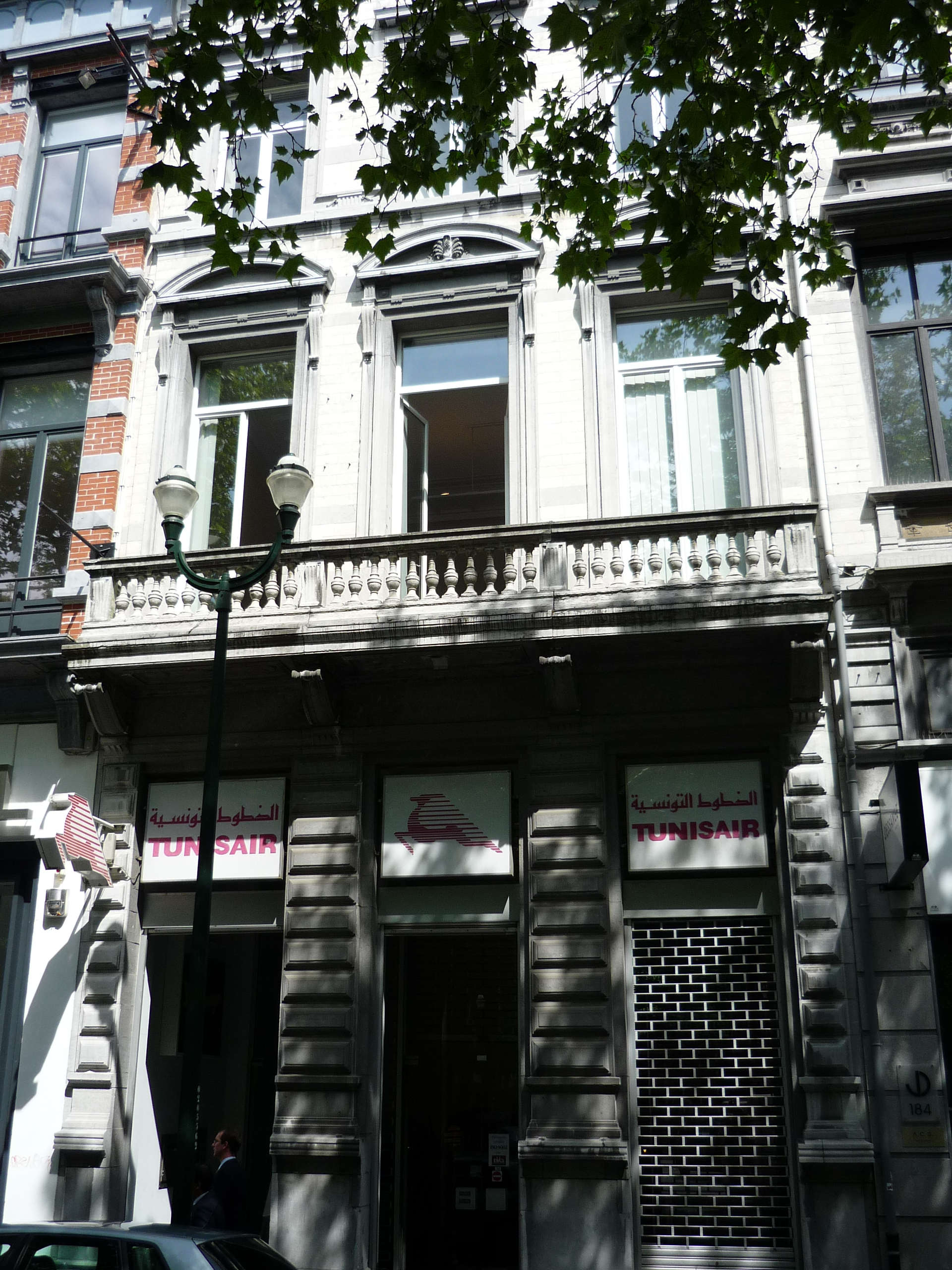
1897 - Avenue Louise, 182, Maison De Leeuw

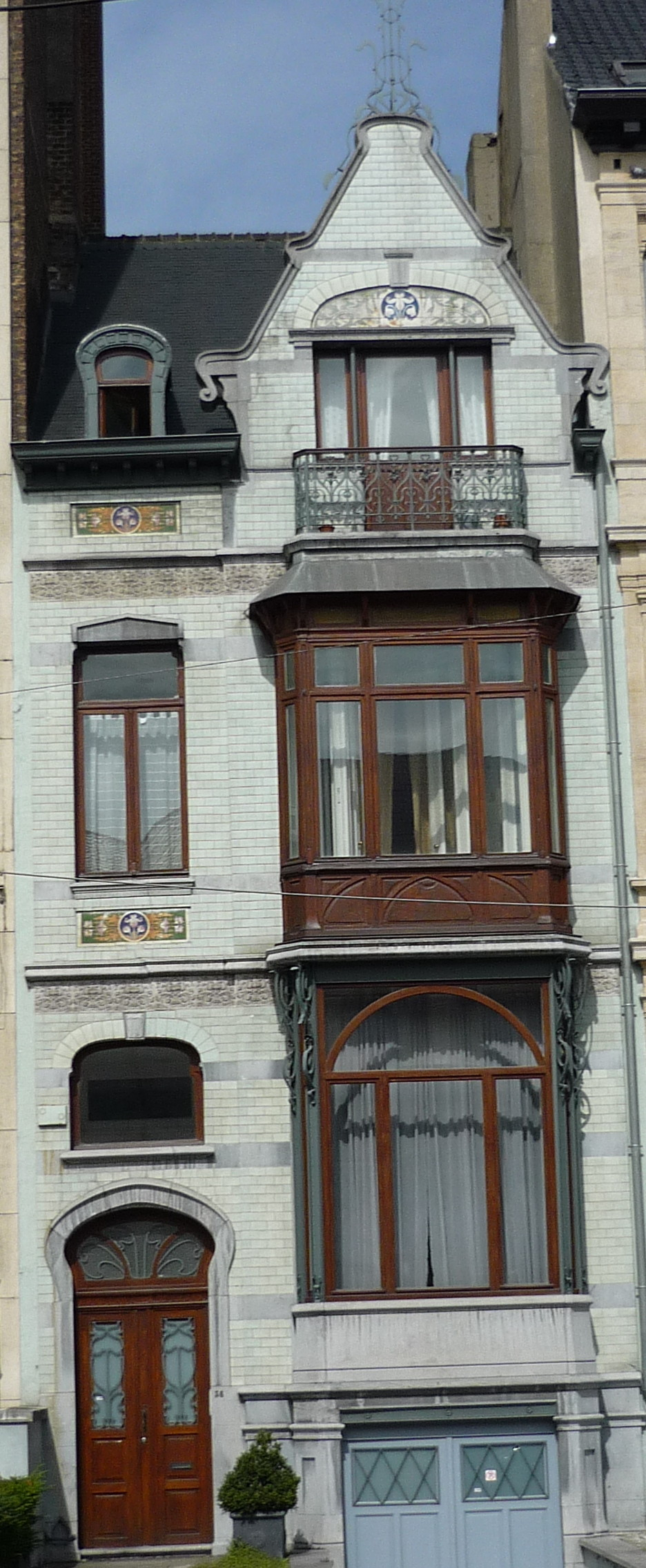
vers 1900 - Maison boulevard Général Jacques, 36, à Etterbeek, Brussels

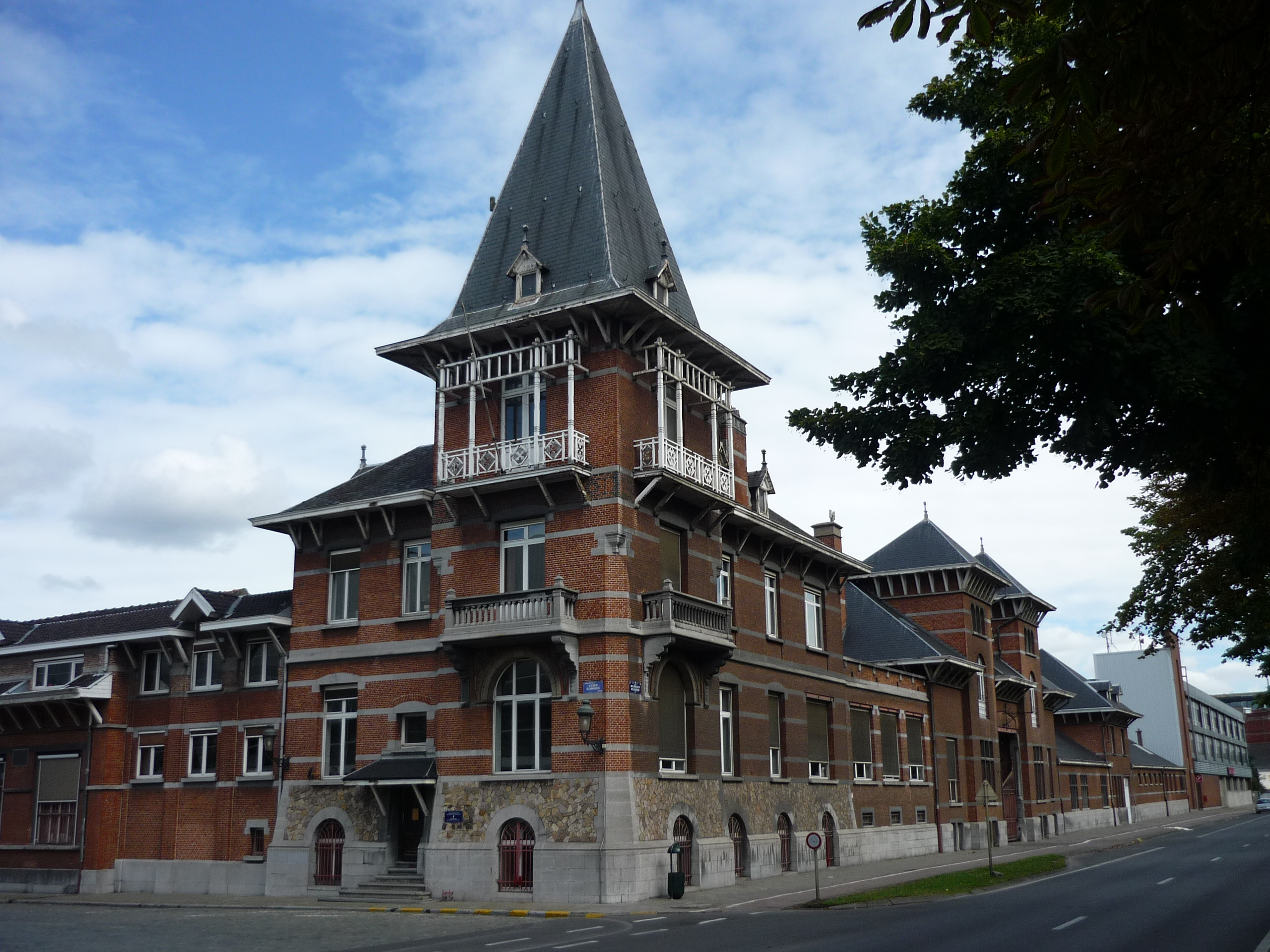
1901 - Ferme des Boues à Bruxelles, Quai de Willebroeck, 22, 1901

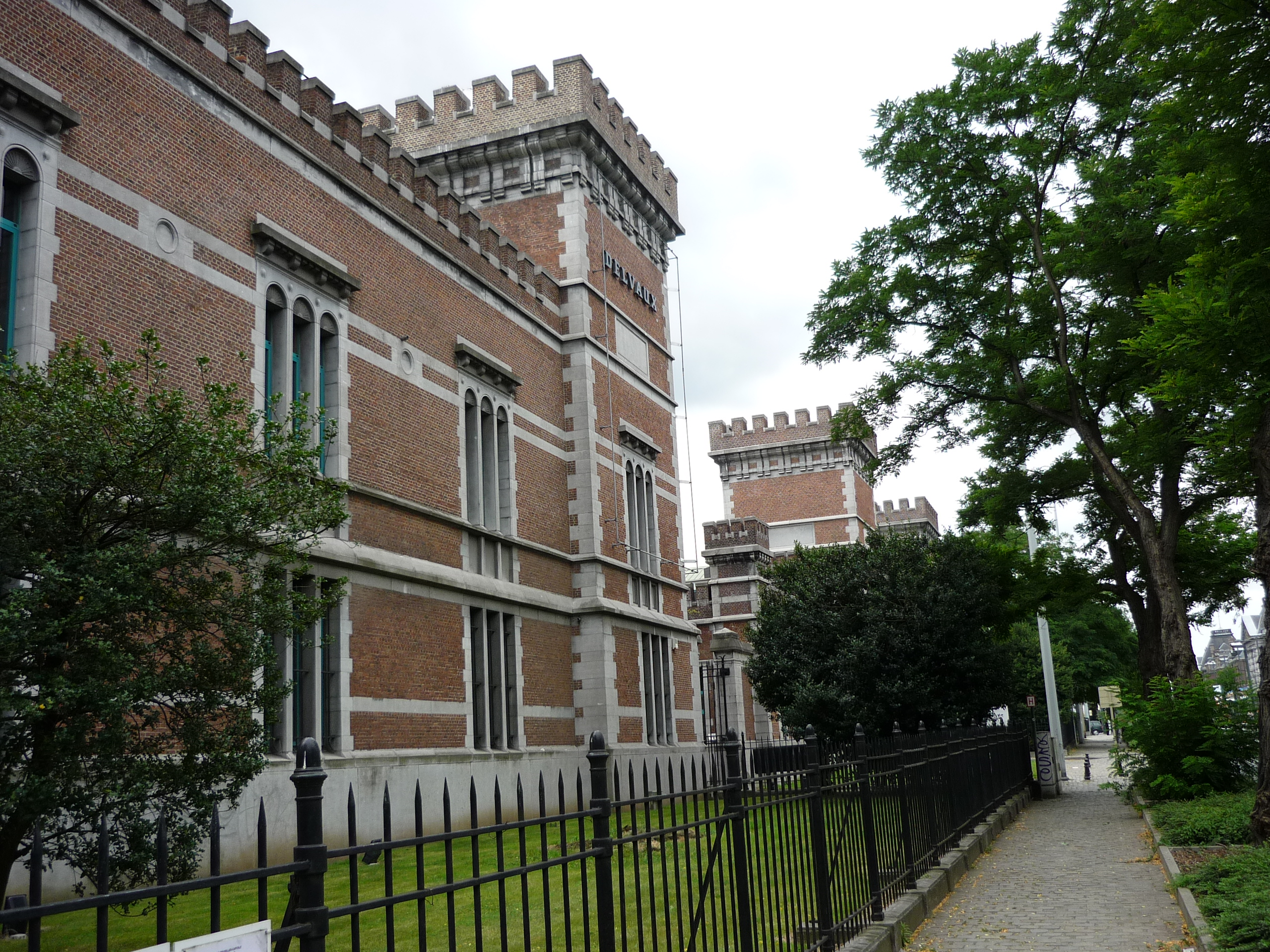
1901–1904 - L'Arsenal du Charroi à Etterbeek, Brussels

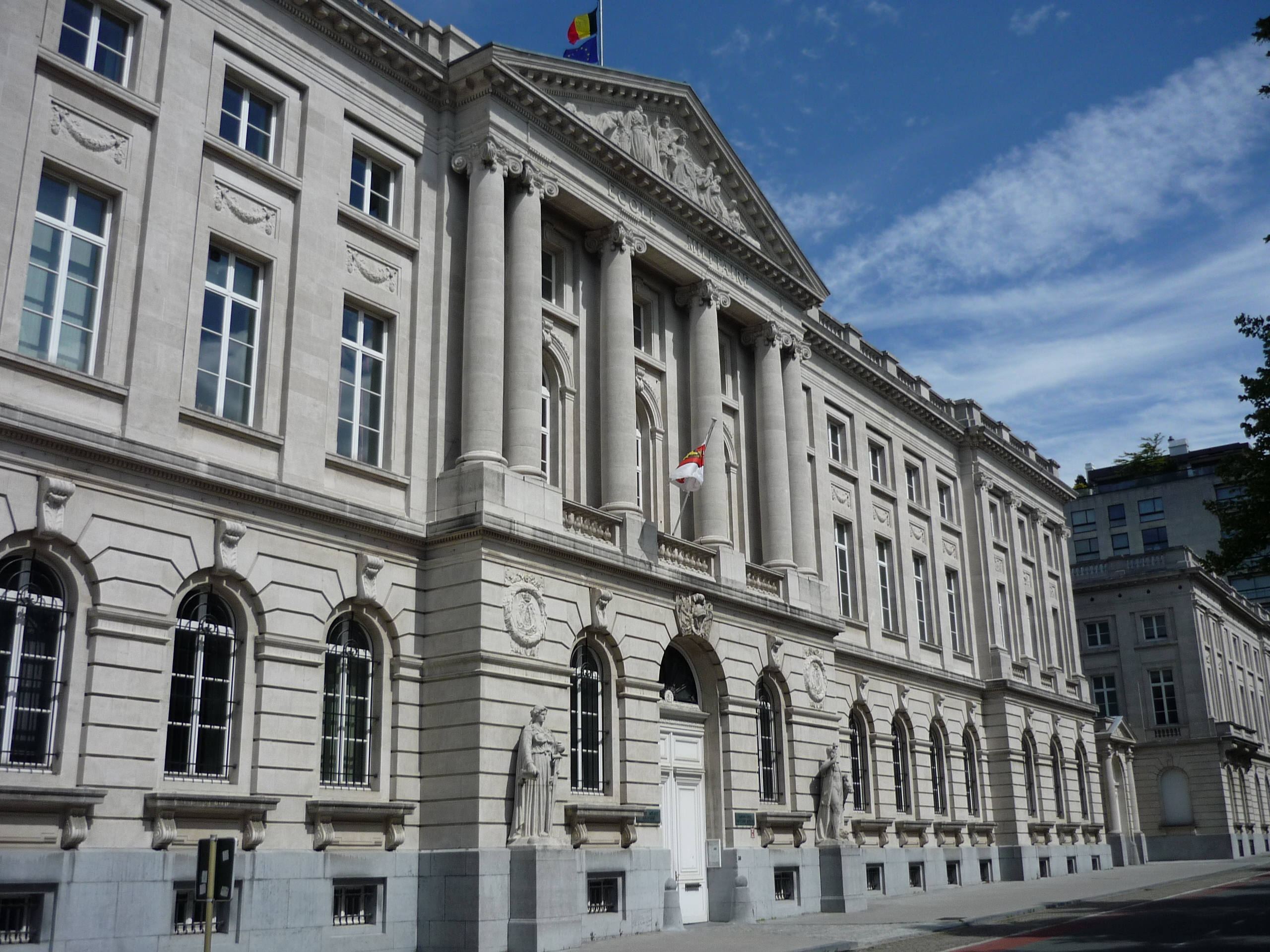
1908 - École royale militaire, avenue de la Renaissance, 30, Brussels by Henri Maquet and Henri van Dievoet.

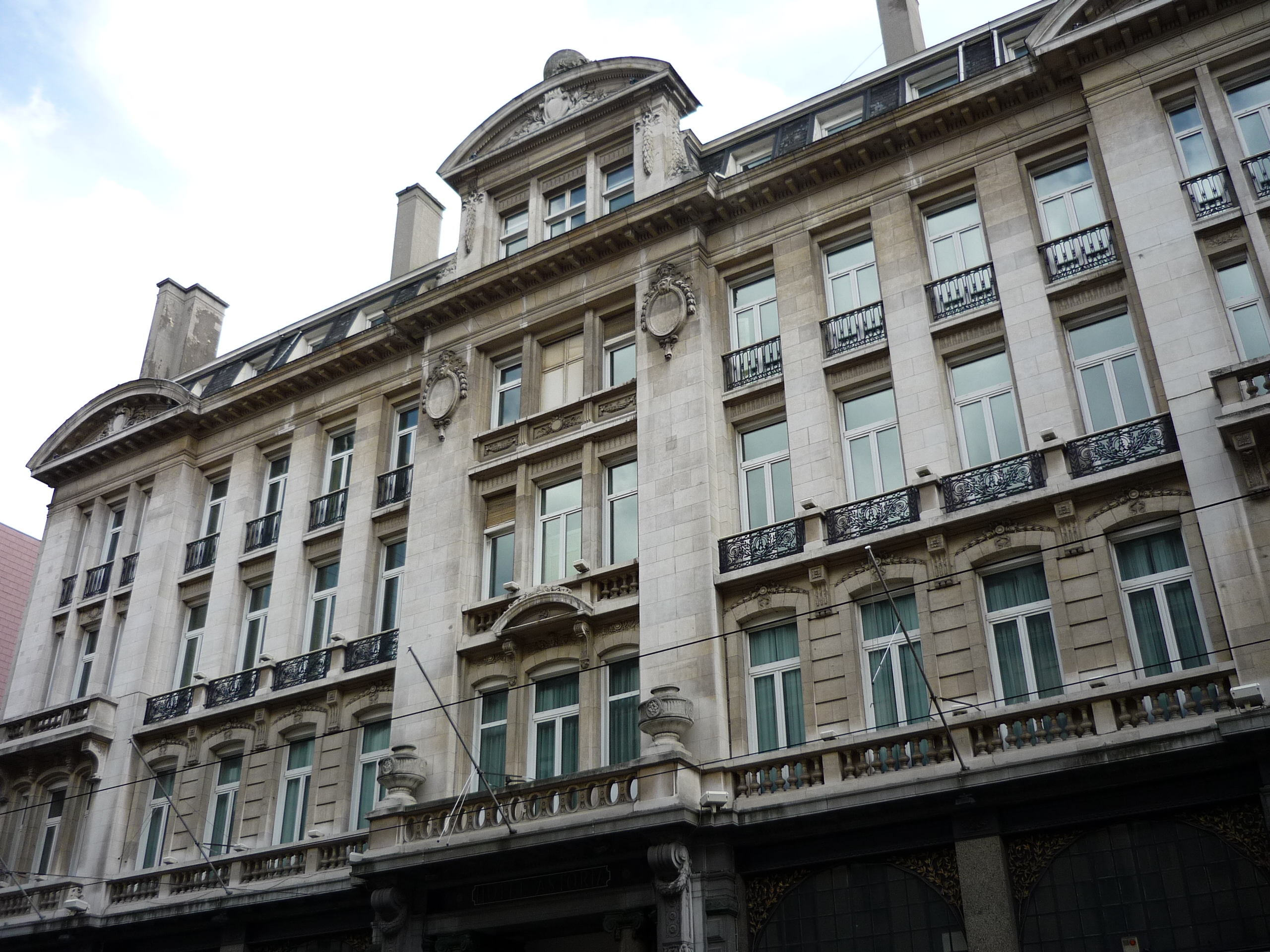
1909 - Hôtel Astoria in Brussels, 1909.

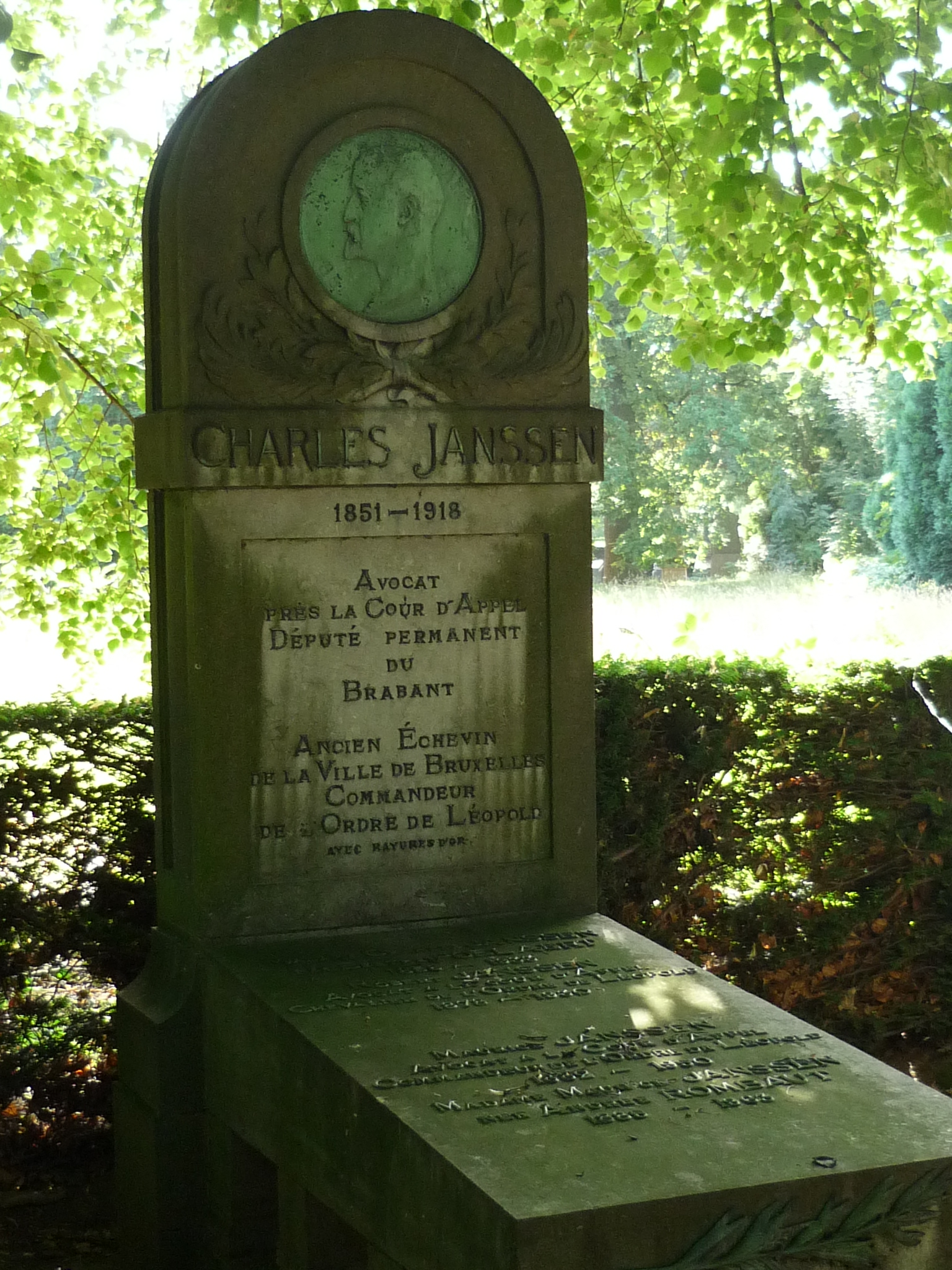
1918 - Family tomb of the cousins Charles Janssen-Poelaert, Brussels

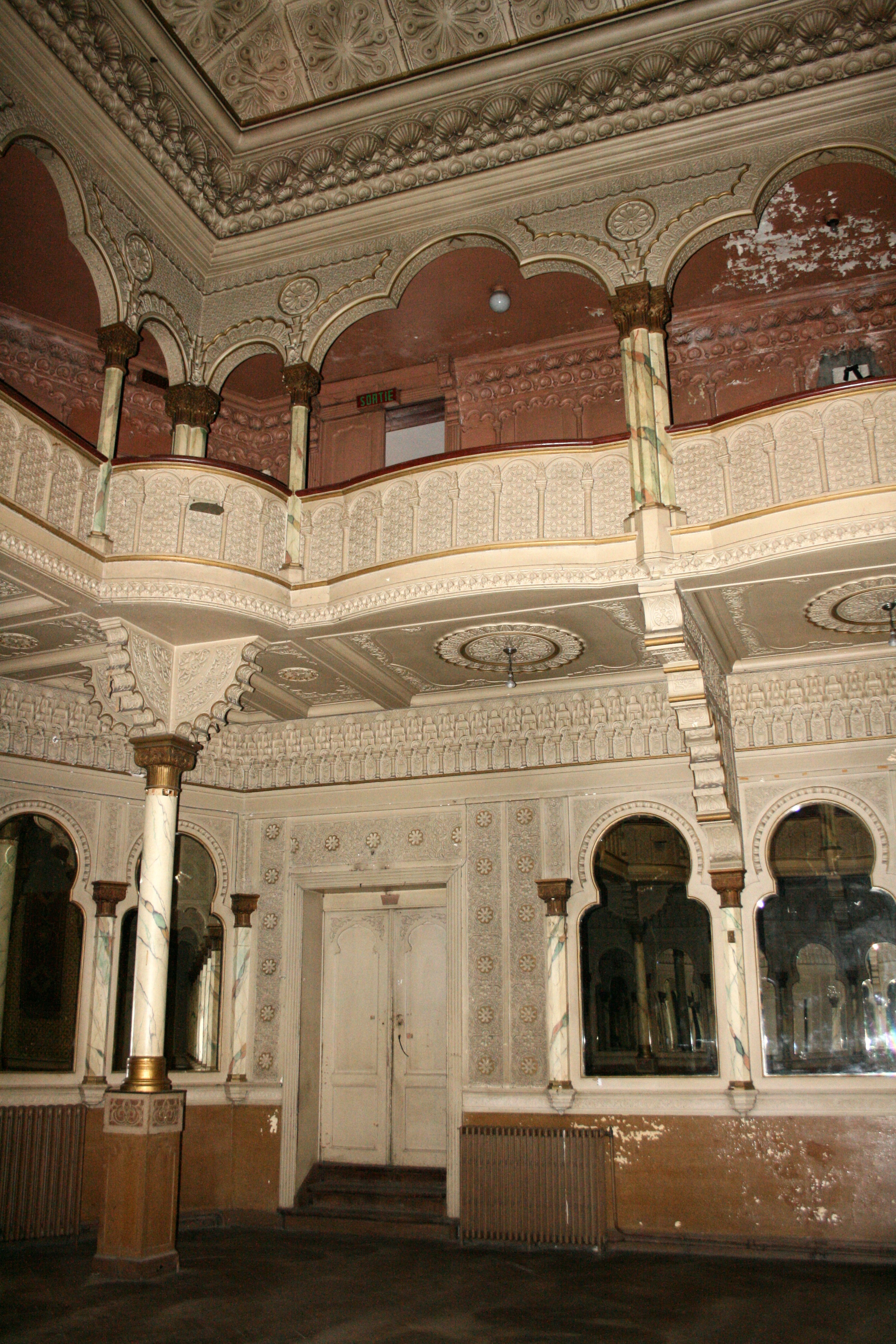
Diamond Deluxe Hotel, (the future Aegidium), part of the Moorish room, in Saint-Gilles.

== Family ==
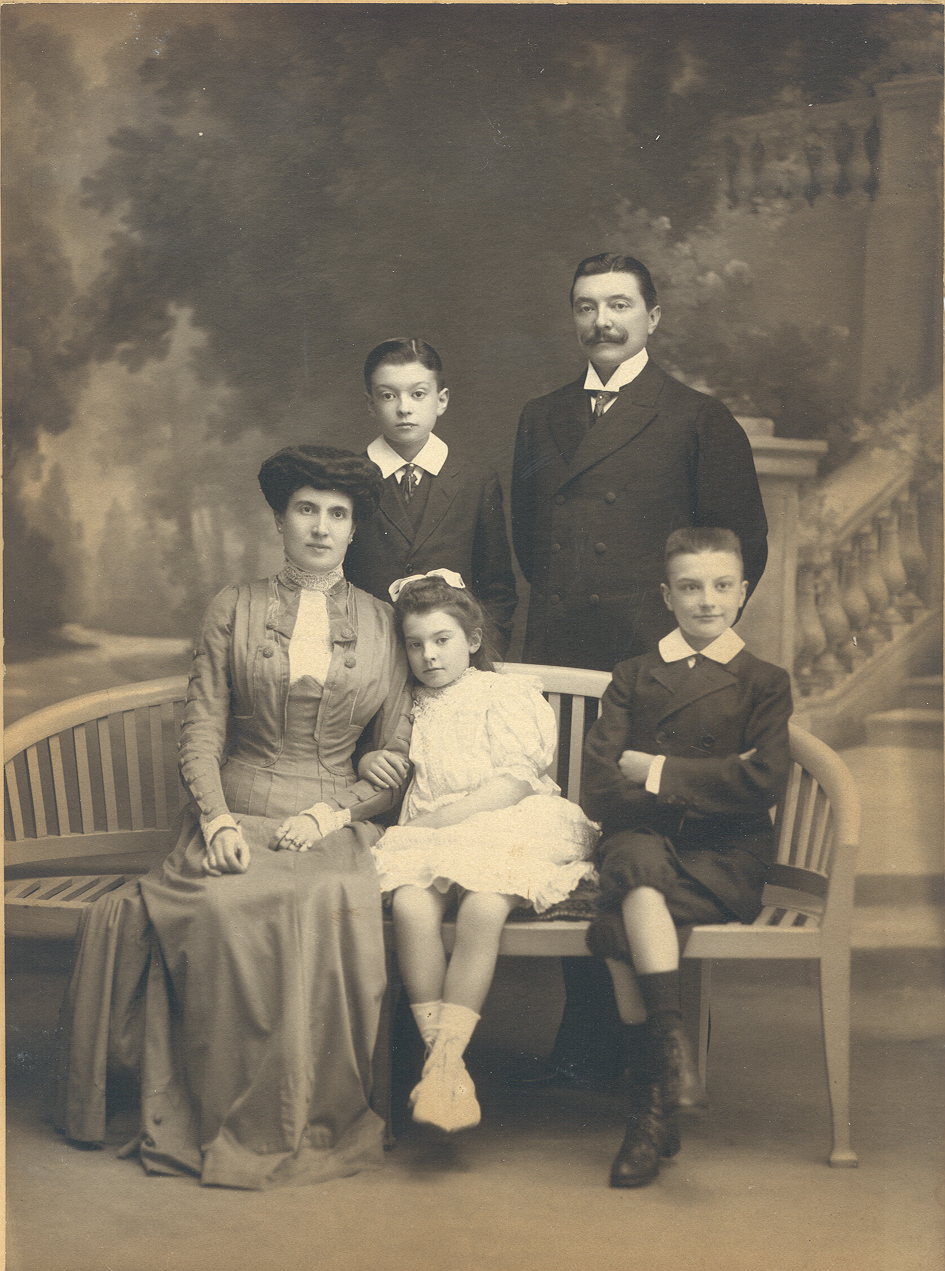
Henri van Dievoet with his family

He married Eugenie Ernestine Clémence Hortense Masson in Ixelles on 2 October 1894. She was born in Ixelles on 9 July 1872, daughter of Captain Stanislas Jean Ernest Masson, knight of the Ordre of Léopold, and Marie Eugenie Louise Clémence Mounoury.

His son, Paul Van Dievoet (born Brussels, 23 August 1896, died Schaerbeek 7 September 1947), was architect for the municipality of Schaerbeek, but also produced private work.

His daughter, Germaine Van Dievoet (born Brussels 26 September 1899, died 30 October 1990 at Uccle), was a championship swimmer who took part in the 1920 Summer Olympics in Antwerp.

Henri Van Dievoet was the brother of the famous decorator and modern-style sgraffitist Gabriel Van Dievoet (1875–1934), whose works still decorate many frontages of Brussels.

He also had a sister, Louise van Dievoet, (born in Brussels on 3 November 1880, died in Paris on 26 December 1964) who married André Gachassin-Lafite, Viscount of Orthez, Knight of the Legion of Honor, captain to the 3rd regiment of Hunters of Africa (quartered with Constantine, Algérie). He was Military Assistant-Attache at the Embassy of France in Brussels, then Member of the High Commission of the Ministry for the War near the factories Schneider, Creusot (1915–1918).

== Works of other Van Dievoet architects ==
Several members of Van Dievoet's family were also architects.

- Paul Van Dievoet (1896–1947), his son, architect of the Commune of Schaerbeek
- Gabriel Van Dievoet (1875–1934), his brother, author of many projects of sgraffitos
- Eugène Van Dievoet (1862–1937), his first cousin, engineer, professor at the Military academy and architect, member of the Royal Company of Archeology of Brussels, designer of the Brison House, boulevard Reyers, 120 (blue Stone-built house, style Louis XV).
- Léon Van Dievoet (1907–1993), his nephew, who in addition to an architectural work left hundreds of drawings, watercolours, paintings and engravings of Brussels that were completed between 1923 and 1993 and which preserve a record of many places that have now disappeared.

== See also ==
- Van Dievoet family
