= Battle of the Lys (1940) =

Part of the German invasion of Belgium

- Part of the Invasion of Belgium of World War II
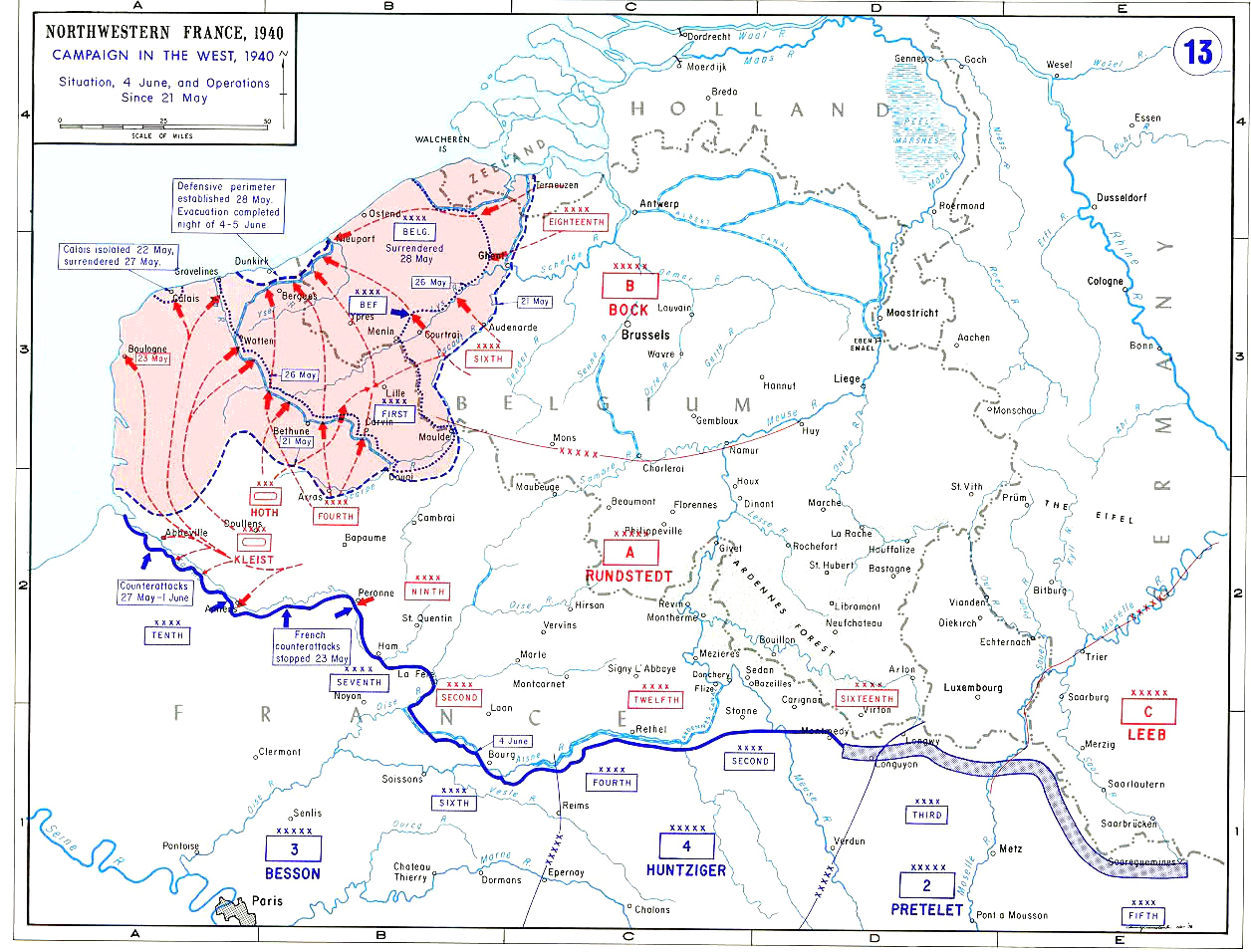
- Final defensive positions of the Allies along the Lys River
| Date | 24–28 May 1940 |
| Location | Region of Kortrijk (Southwest Flanders), Belgium 51°3′18″N 3°44′3″E |
| Result | German victory: Vinkt massacre; Belgian surrender on 28 May |

Belligerents
| Belgium; France; United Kingdom | Germany |

Commanders and leaders
| (Belgium) Leopold III (POW) (Belgium) Oscar Michiels (POW) (French Third Republic) Georges Blanchard (United Kingdom) Alan Brooke | (Nazi Germany) Fedor von Bock (Nazi Germany) Georg von Küchler |

Strength
| 500,000 | 12 divisions |

Casualties and losses
| 40,000+ casualties | Unknown |

The Battle of the Lys (French: Bataille de la Lys, Dutch: Leieslag) was a major battle between Belgian and German forces during the German invasion of Belgium of 1940 and the final major battle fought by Belgian troops before their surrender on 28 May. The battle was the bloodiest of the 18 Days' Campaign. The battle was named after the Leie (French: Lys), the river at which the battlefield occurred.

== Battle ==
=== Initial fighting ===
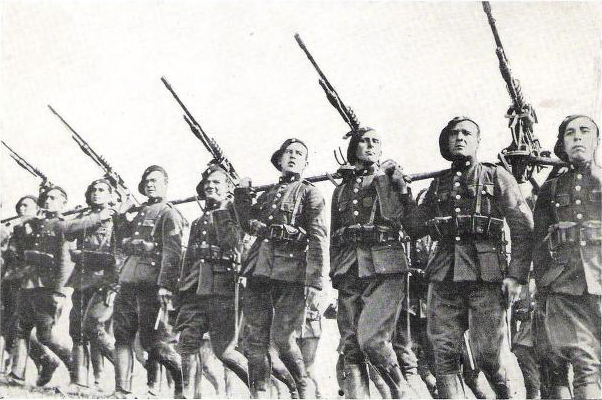
Chasseurs Ardennais, Belgium's elite soldiers tasked with defending Vinkt

On 24 May, a heavy German attack forced Allied troops to fall back at Kortrijk over the Lys to the 1st and 3rd Belgian divisions. The Belgians had been persuaded to abandon the Scheldt and withdraw to relieve British troops for an Allied counter-offensive, but that strategically did little to alleviate the situation at the front. With the Allied line facing four German divisions, the 9th and 10th Belgian Divisions rushed in to reinforce the position. The Belgian II Army Corps launched a counter-attack and captured 200 German soldiers. Belgian artillery opened up effectively on the Germans, but Allied lines were subject to numerous bombing raids and strafing runs, with negligible air support of their own. A German division from Menen moved up to Ypres, threatening to cut the Belgian Army off from the British. The Belgians' 2nd Cavalry Brigade and 6th Infantry Division came in to support the area and managed to hold off the Germans.

On 25 May, the British, realizing that further counteroffensives were no longer possible, began to withdraw to the port of Dunkirk. All hopes of saving the Belgian Army were lost. It became clear from this point on that all the Belgians could do was buy enough time for the Allies to evacuate. The British spared a brigade and a machine gun battalion, their only reserves, to assist in the delay. At 06:30, the 12th Royal Lancers, an armoured car regiment, was dispatched to the north of the Lys to cover the left flank of the British 2nd Army Corps and reestablish contact with the Belgians in the area. The regiment reported that the Belgians were retreating in the face of superior forces, and they themselves sporadically engaged the Germans. In an order to his troops that day, King Leopold III informed the Army, "Whatever may happen, I shall share your fate". Low morale prompted sections of the Belgian 5th and 17th regiments to surrender the bridgehead at Meigem without a fight. That was in direct contradiction of their officer's orders, which were ignored. In one instance, fed-up soldiers shot their superiors. The elite Chasseurs Ardennais were deployed to the small village of Vinkt. Here the 1st Division successfully repulsed numerous attacks by Germany's 56th Infantry Division. Lieutenant Colonel George Davy, head of the British Military Mission to the Belgian Army Headquarters, was informed that the Belgians would be unable to extend their front any further. Starting that night, 2,000 wagons were lined up side by side along the rail line from Roeselare to Ypres to act as an improvised anti-tank barrier.

=== Belgian position worsens ===
By 26 May the Allied position was becoming desperate. The Belgians were struggling to hold Izegem, Nevele, and Ronsele. The Chasseurs Ardennais held their ground against the 56th division, which was subsequently replaced by the 225th Infantry Division. The German 256th Infantry Division managed to cross over the canal at Balgerhoeck and attack Eeklo. The Belgian Lanciers Regiment abandoned Passchendaele and Zonnebeke, and British engineers blew up the Menin Gate bridge. Fresh German units threatened to split the Belgian and British lines, but their attack was blunted by a Belgian infantry division and a cavalry division. An additional infantry division maintained the integrity of the defensive line. All of Belgium's reserves were deployed, and auxiliary troops began arming themselves with 75mm guns from training centers to form the rear. The Belgian Command began resorting to flooding the canals to contain the Germans. At midday the Belgian Army informed the French head of the mission to the Army Headquarters, General Pierre Champon that "the Army has nearly reached the limits of its endurance". At 18:00, French General Georges Blanchard arrived to inform Leopold that the British were withdrawing further to the rear on the Lille-Ypres line. Lord Gort ordered Major General Harold Franklyn to man the dry Comines-Ypres Canal with the 5th Infantry Division to cover the withdrawal towards Dunkirk. That evening, Leopold began making plans to relocate his headquarters to Middelkerke.

=== Near collapse and surrender of the Belgian Army ===
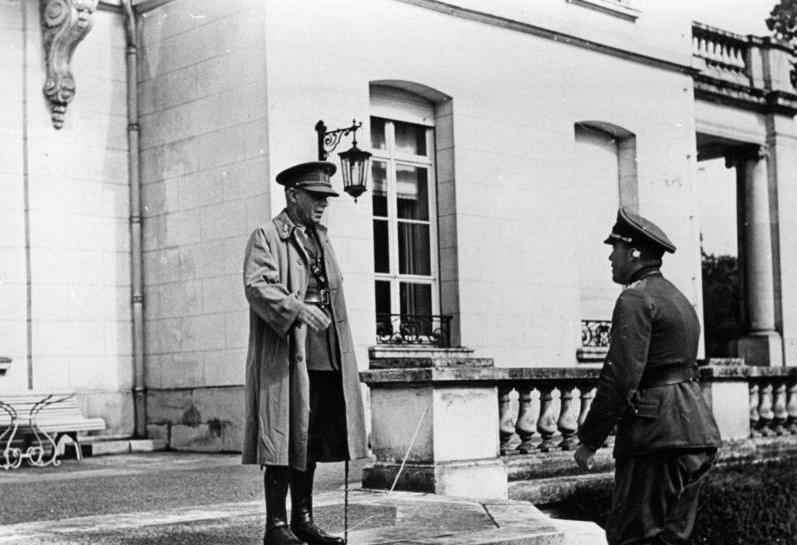
Negotiations for the Belgian surrender

The Belgian Army began to collapse on 27 May. The railways were out of service, the roads were clogged with 1.5 million refugees (in addition to the 800,000 people already living in the area), ammunition and food were running low and no fresh troops were available. The Belgians began destroying their artillery as they exhausted their munitions and retreated. By 11:00, the line had been breached north of Maldegem, in the centre near Ursel and to the right near Thielt and Roeselare. Bruges was the only major Belgian city not yet taken by the Germans. At 16:00, the Chasseurs Ardennais were forced to abandon Vinkt, which left the Germans in control. They had lost 39 men while managing to kill 170 Germans. In the subsequent Vinkt massacre, 86 civilians in the village were killed by vengeful German troops. However, a counterattack by the 4th Carabiners Cyclists at Knesselaere yielded 120–200 German prisoners.

Around the same time, the Belgian Command came to accept:

"(1) From the national point of view, the Belgian Army had carried out its task; it had resisted to the limit of its capacity; its units were unable to continue the fight. There could be no retreat to the Yser; it would do more to destroy the units than the fighting in progress; it would increase the congestion of the Allied forces to the highest pitch;
(2) from the international point of view, the dispatch of an envoy to ask for terms for the cessation of hostilities would have the advantage of allowing the Allies the night of the 27th–28th and part of the morning of the 28th, an interval that, if the fighting were continued, could be gained only at the cost of the complete destruction of the Army".

The Belgian army's chief of staff, Lieutenant General Oscar Michiels, recommended that a representative be sent to the Germans to negotiate a ceasefire. At 17:00, Leopold decided to send the army's deputy chief of staff, Major General Olivier Derousseaux, to the headquarters of the German 18th Army. Two French Army divisions were withdrawn via truck towards Dunkirk while Belgian flags and battle standards were hidden for safekeeping. A final order of retreat was issued from the Belgian Army headquarters at 20:00. General Derousseaux returned at 22:00 hours with the reply: "The Führer demands that arms be laid down unconditionally". King Leopold was disappointed by the demand but acknowledged that there were no options for the Belgian Army. At 23:00, with the full support of his staff, he accepted the demand and agreed to a ceasefire at 04:00.

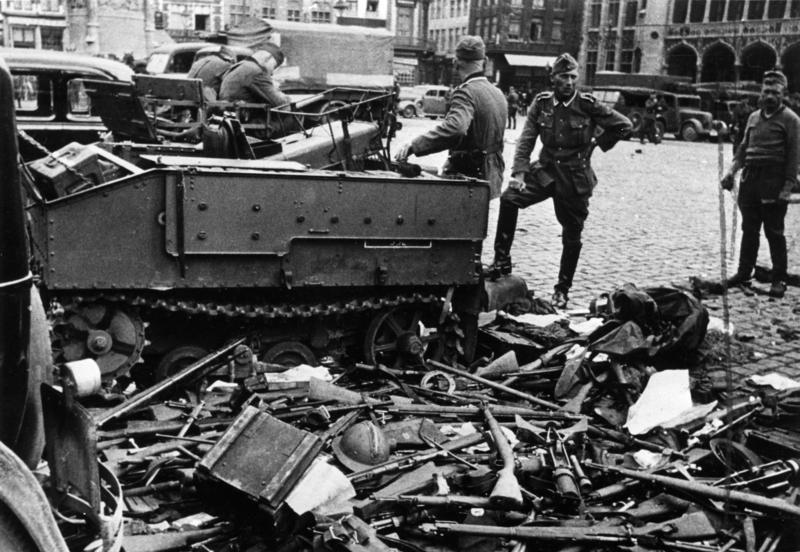
Belgian weapons discarded in Bruges after the surrender of 28 May 1940

The Belgians laid down their arms at 04:00 on 28 May. Fighting continued at the Roeselare-Ypres line until 06:00, when the troops stationed there finally received the order to capitulate. Leopold made one final proclamation to his men:

"Plunged unexpectedly into a war of unparalleled violence, you have fought courageously to defend your homeland step by step. Exhausted by an uninterrupted struggle against an enemy very much superior in numbers and material, we have been forced to surrender. History will relate that the Army did its duty to the full. Our Honour is safe. This violent fighting, these sleepless nights, cannot have been in vain. I enjoin you not to be disheartened, but to bear yourselves with dignity. Let your attitude and your discipline continue to win you the esteem of the foreigner. I shall not leave you in our misfortune, and I shall watch over your future and that of your families. Tomorrow we will set to work with the firm intention of raising our country from its ruins."

== Aftermath ==
In spite of the Belgians' attempts to delay the Germans for as long as possible, the surrender angered the Allies, whose armies' north-western flank was now vulnerable to German attack. French civilians became increasingly hostile to Belgians in their midst.

The battle was one of the bloodiest of the Belgian campaign. Of Belgium's 80,000 casualties from the invasion, 40,000 occurred between 25 and 27 May.

On 30 May, General Michiels gave a speech to all the senior Belgian officers to thank them for their service.

Leopold's decision to remain with his army and surrender was seen as traitorous by Hubert Pierlot and the Belgian government in exile. After the war, public suspicion of his loyalties would lead to the Royal Question. In the end, Leopold abdicated the throne in favor of his son.

== Commemoration ==
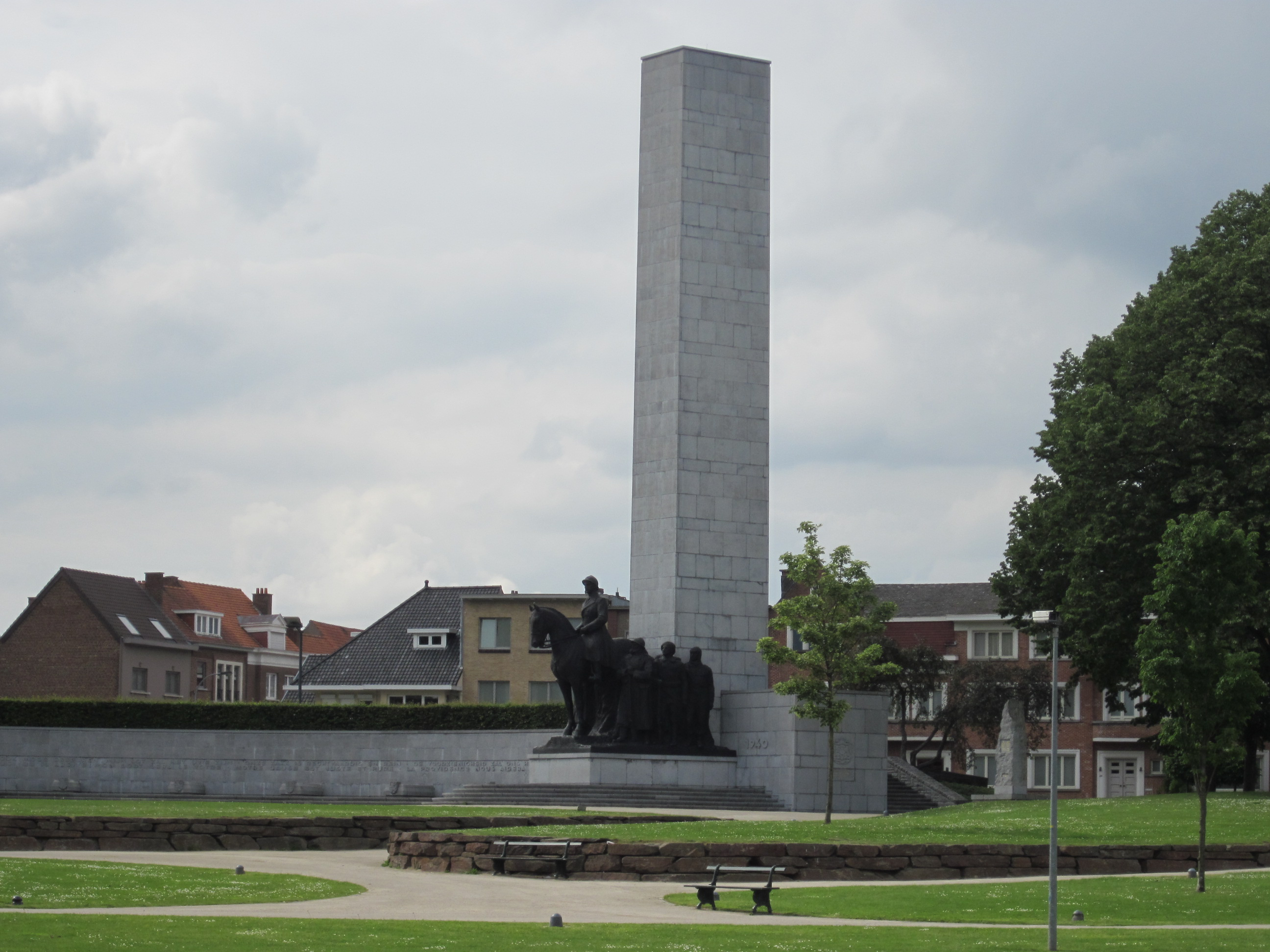
The Leiemonument (Monument of the Lys)

In the Albertpark, in the centre of Kortrijk, the Battle of the Lys is commemorated every year near the city's Monument of the Lys.

== See also ==
- Manstein Plan

== Sources ==
- Dildy, Doug (2010). Dunkirk 1940: Operation Dynamo. Bloomsbury USA. ISBN 9781846034572.
- Epstein, Jonathan A. (2014). Belgium's Dilemma: The Formation of the Belgian Defense Policy, 1932–1940 (reprint ed.). Brill. ISBN 9789004269736.
- More, Charles (2013). The Road to Dunkirk: The British Expeditionary Force and the Battle of the Ypres-Comines Canal, 1940. Frontline. pp. 45–53. ISBN 9781473831605.
- Veranneman, Jean-Michel (2014). Belgium in the Second World War (illustrated ed.). Pen and Sword. ISBN 9781783376070.
