= Henri Maquet =

Belgian architect

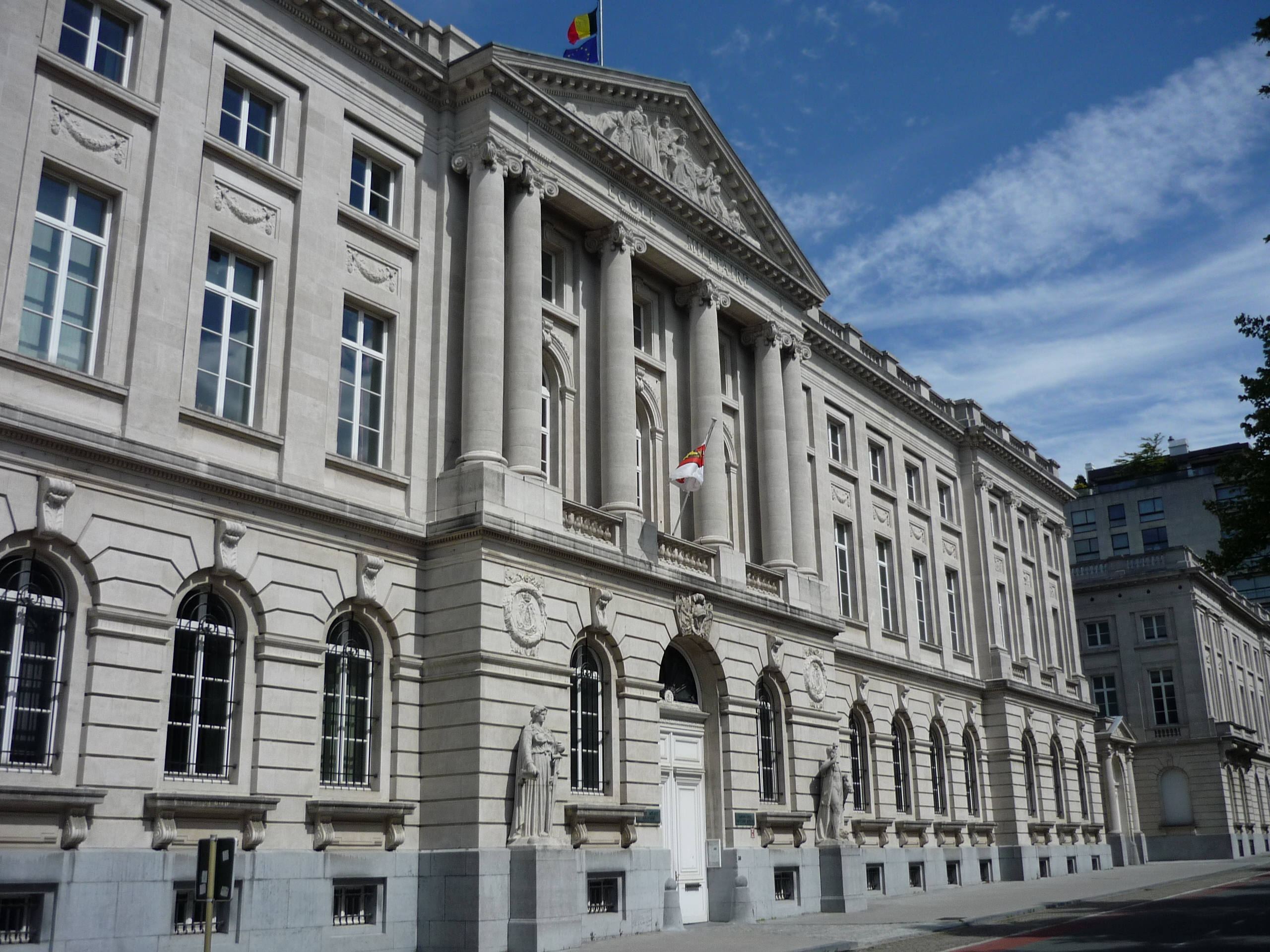
Royal Military School, with Henri van Dievoet

Henri Maquet (French pronunciation: [ɑ̃ʁi makɛ]; 30 August 1839 – 27 November 1909) was a Belgian architect, best known for his work for King Leopold II of Belgium.

Born in Brussels, Maquet trained in Liège, at the Académie Royale des Beaux-Arts in Brussels, then worked in the office of Hendrik Beyaert. His work includes:

- Venetian Galleries, Ostend, 1900-1903
- Royal Military Academy, Avenue de la Renaissance, with Henri Van Dievoet, circa 1900
- Completion of the Royal Palace of Brussels, 1904
- Work at the Brussels Park, 1907

== Sources ==
- Henri Maquet at archINFORM
