= Royal Military Academy (Belgium) =

Military university of Belgium

- École royale militaire (French); Koninklijke Militaire School (Dutch); Königliche Militärakademie (German)
- Type: Military academy
- Established: 7 February 1834; 192 years ago
- Academic affiliations: ISMS (2011-2017)
- Commandant: Major general An-Roos De Potter
- Students: 850
- Location: Brussels, Belgium; 50°50′41″N 4°23′32″E
- Website: www.rma.ac.be
- Polytechnique faculty S.M.S. faculty

The Royal Military Academy (French: École royale militaire, pronounced [ekɔl ʁwajal militɛʁ]; Dutch: Koninklijke Militaire School, pronounced [ˈkoːnɪŋkləkə miliˈtɛːrə ˈsxoːl]) is the military university of Belgium. The institution is responsible for the education of the officers of the five components of the Belgian defence (Army, Air Force, Cyber, Navy, Medical) and is located in Brussels in a building constructed by the architects Henri Maquet and Henri Van Dievoet. The courses are given in French, Dutch, and English. The institution's predecessor was the Royal Military and Mathematics Academy of Brussels.

The academy comprises two faculties:

- The Faculty of Applied Sciences (Polytechnique, X): Master of Science in engineering sciences; comparable to the French École polytechnique (also nicknamed "X" and founded by one of its ex-students, Jean Chapelié)
- The Faculty of Social and Military Sciences (S.M.S.): Master in Social and Military Sciences

The Royal Higher Institute for Defence, the highest military academic institute in Belgium is also located at the RMA campus (cf. Defence College, previously War College).

== Admission ==
Admission to the university is only possible through public exams.

First, candidates must pass a military test common to all Belgian military categories (Medical, Endurance and physical tests, and a psychologic evaluation). After passing these, applying students have to compete with each other in public exams. These consist of mathematics and French & Dutch written language tests. The university can only accommodate a certain number of students each year (rough estimate: 150/year) (strongly influenced by the need for officers of the Belgian military). Applicants compete with each other for these limited places.

== Bologna ==
Since 2003, the academy made some changes to its faculties to conform with the Bologna Process. Both degrees are now taught within a five-year span. After the first three years, students receive a bachelor degree. The master's degree can be attained in succeeding the following two years. In contrast to the common Bologna implementation, flexibility in attaining the degrees is not greatly augmented. Student can only fail for one year within all five. Re-exams are, however, possible. Student cannot take courses with them to the next year; they have to pass the re-exams. Before 2003 most courses were fixed, but students had a limited choice of optional courses. A lot of flexibility regarding course choices was added by implementing course modules. Students can opt for certain modules which each hold specific and related courses. For example:

- Law module
- Psychology module
- Weapon systems module (ballistics)
- Management module
- Marine science module
- History module
- Communication & Information Systems module (telecom, computer security, electricity)

The choice of course module is not always free, but is related with the chosen military speciality of the student (infantry, logistics, transmission, air traffic control, artillery, naval forces..) and often mandatory. The majority of the courses remains fixed in the bachelor years. In the master's years, the students follow more modules than fixed courses.

== Nationalities ==
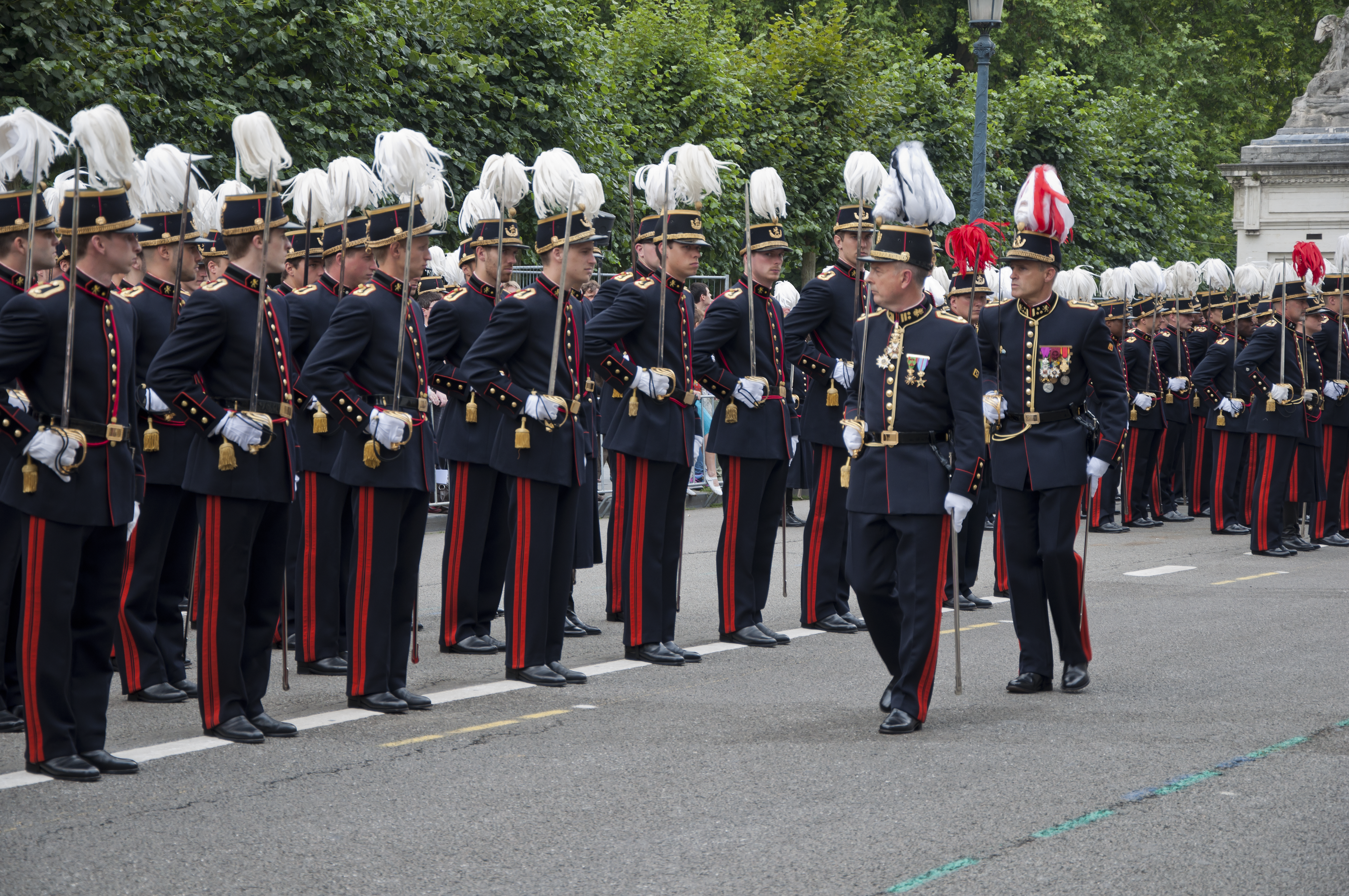
Officers-Students at the Royal Military Academy on parade on Belgian National Day, 2011

The vast majority of the students have Belgian nationality, but cooperation with other countries has opened up the university to other nationalities. Many Luxembourgish officers receive their education in the university and have a long history in it.

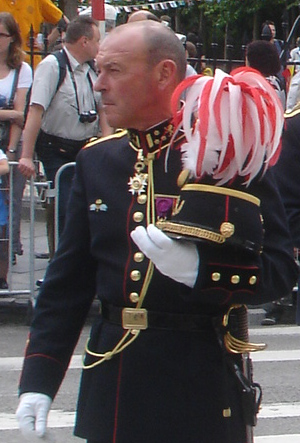
The parade uniform

More recently the university received military students from Canada, Lebanon, United States, Niger, the Democratic Republic of the Congo, Morocco, Tunisia and Rwanda, thanks to military cooperation, training and development programs. However, these students often belong to the social elite of their home country. The foreign students, in contrast to the Belgian students, have no obligation to follow the Dutch language courses.

== Notable alumni ==
=== Royal family ===
The tradition of the royal princes to study at the academy is continuous.

- Prince Alexander of Belgium: 116th promotion POL (1960–61)
- Prince Philippe, King of Belgians: 118th TAW promotion (1978)
- Prince Laurent of Belgium: 123rd TAW (1983)
- Prince Amedeo of Belgium: 144th SSMW (2004–2005 academic year)
- Princess Elisabeth, Duchess of Brabant: 160th SSMW (2020–2021 academic year)
- Prince Gabriel of Belgium: 162th SSMW (2022–present)

=== Others ===
- Frank, Viscount De Winne, engineer, fighter pilot, test pilot, ESA astronaut
- Fernand Jacquet, World War I fighter ace
- Michel Micombero, President of Burundi
- Jean-Baptiste Piron, Belgian Army Chief of Staff
- Henri Alexis Brialmont, Belgian Army, politician, writer known as a military architect and fortress designer
- Antonin de Selliers de Moranville, Chief Commander of the Belgian army during World War I.
- Alphonse Jacques de Dixmude, Commander of the Belgian 12th Regiment of the Line during the Battle of the Yser during World War I
- Alexandros Papagos, the only professional officer to hold the rank of field marshal in the Hellenic Army; after World War II, elected as Prime Minister of Greece

== Notable faculty ==
- Émile Janssens (1902–1989), history
- Oscar Michiels (1881–1946), military staffing
- Jean Stas (1813–1891), chemistry

== Affiliation ==
The Belgian Staff College was voted into the International Society of Military Sciences during the November 2011 meeting, it withdrew its membership in 2017.
