= Georges Marquet =

Belgian politician (1866–1947)

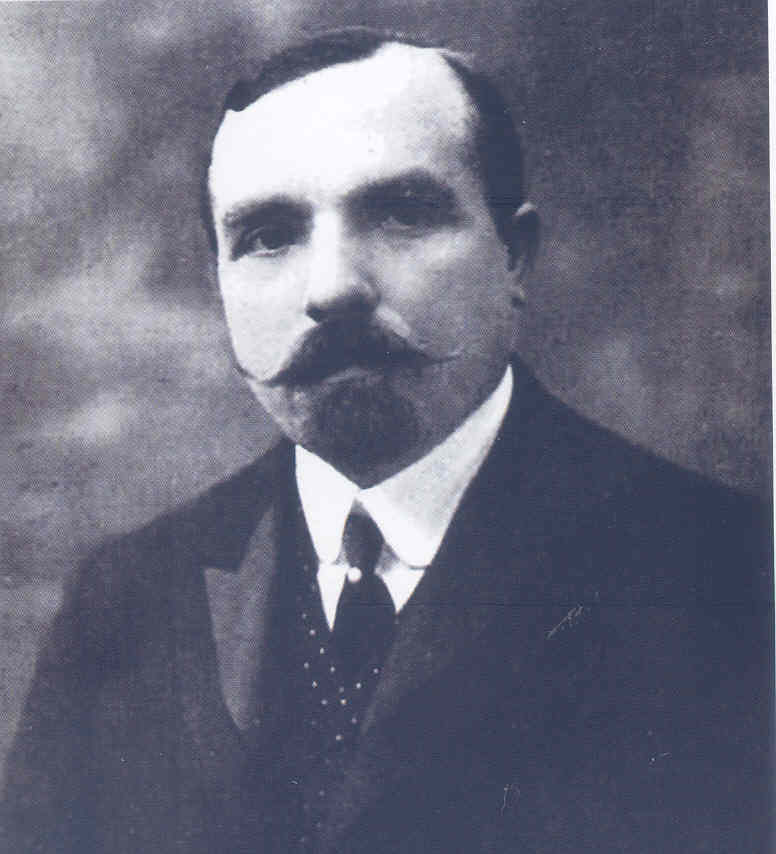
Georges Marquet

Georges Marquet (born 18 September 1866 in Jemeppe-sur-Meuse – died 27 March 1947 in Nice) was a Belgian hotel manager and owner of several luxurious hotels across Europe. He founded the Compagnie Internationale des Grands Hôtels Européens, which later became part of the Compagnie Internationale des wagons-lits group, established by his fellow Belgian Georges Nagelmackers, the inventor of the Orient-Express, among other accomplishments.

After acquiring the most luxurious hotels of Madrid, Spain, namely, the Ritz Madrid and the Palace Hotel (today called Westin Palace), his son moved to Madrid and took charge of managing the Ritz Madrid direction.

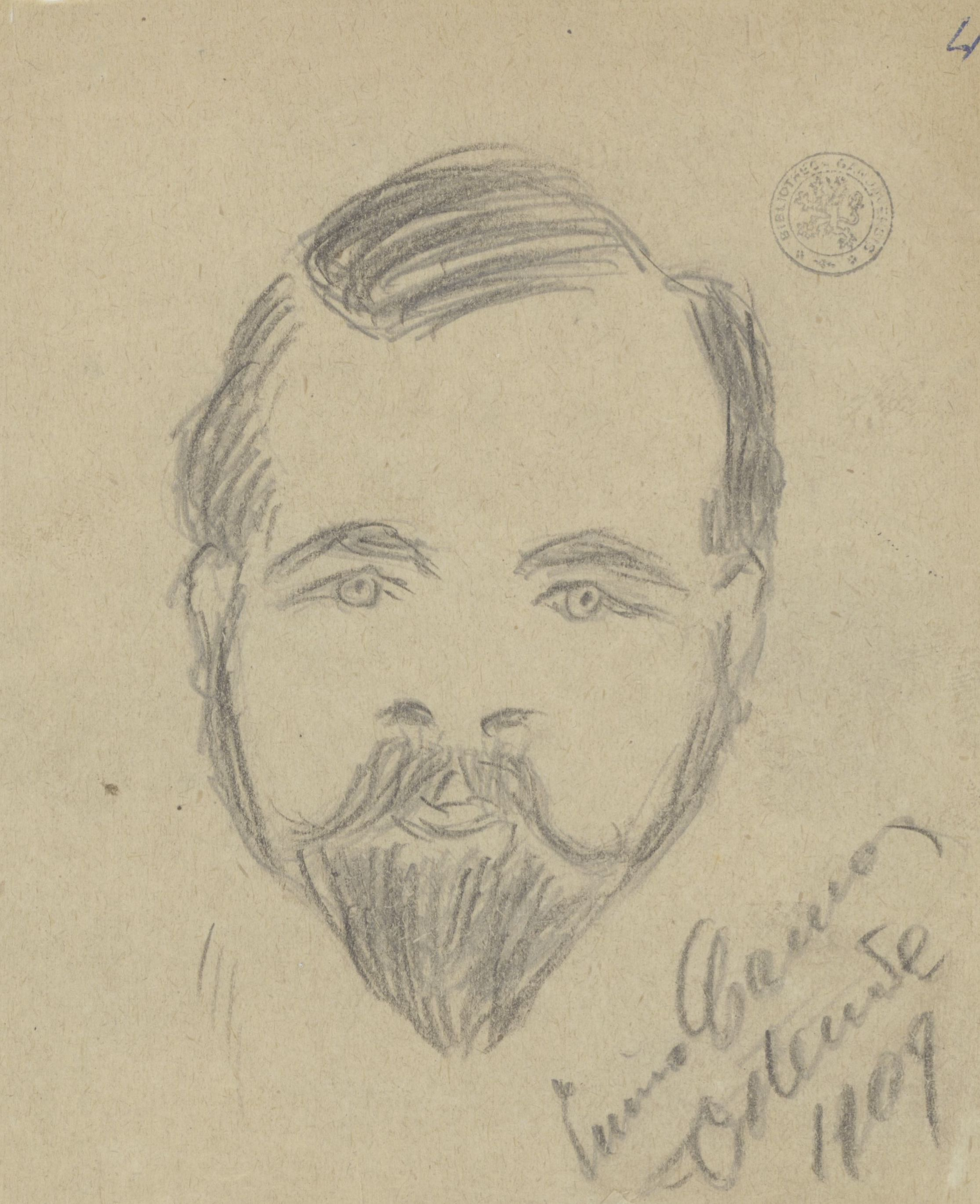
Portrait of Georges Marquet by Enrico Caruso, 1909, Ghent University Library

Georges Marquet was a member of the Belgian Parliament for the Liberal Party, from 1929 until 1936.
