= Christophe Hardiquest =

Belgian chef

- Born: 20 October 1975 (age 50); Waremme, Belgium
- Education: École hôtelière de la province de Namur
- Culinary career
- Current restaurant(s): Bon Bon (2001–2022) Menssa (2023–present)
- Award(s) won: Two Michelin stars (Bon Bon) Five toques, Gault&Millau

Christophe Hardiquest, born on 20 October 1975 in Waremme, is a Belgian chef.

He is the chef of the restaurant Bon Bon in Woluwe-Saint-Pierre (Brussels), with two stars in the Michelin Guide and five toques in the Gault Millau.

== Biography ==
Hardiquest grew up in Ans (Liège Province). His childhood left him memories of the simple tastes of chicons au gratin, boulets à la liégeoise and frites à la graisse de bœuf (French fries made with dripping). He developed a taste for cooking through contact with his Flemish grandmother, from Tongeren, who made her own bread and hams in the countryside. At the age of 14, Hardiquest chose his path and entered the École hôtelière de la province de Namur.

The training lasts four years and Hardiquest, passionate, multiplies the courses. He did a three-month internship in the United States and, back in Liège, met his partner Stéphanie in 1995 He decided to move to Brussels and started to work at the restaurant l'Amandier sleeping in his Honda Civic, parked in front of la Villa Lorraine restaurant, because he could not afford accommodation. He then moved with his girlfriend to Anderlecht, thanks to his first salaries. He worked for Yves Mattagne at SAS Radisson, where he did all the jobs for a year. He then alternated between starred and non-starred restaurants, working for Roland Debuyst in Nossegem, before going back to the United States.

Back in Belgium, he worked for two and a half years with Pascal Simon, where he became sous-chef. He then became head chef for the first time in a restaurant in Brussels, Voyage à travers les sens.

In 2001, he launched his restaurant Bon Bon with only €2500. The restaurant is located in an Indonesian furniture shop in Uccle. In 2004, he was awarded a Michelin star.

In 2011, Hardiquest moved his restaurant Bon Bon to Woluwe-Saint-Pierre and in November 2013, he received a second star in the Guide Michelin vintage 2014.

In October 2019, Hardiquest took part in the shooting of the fourth episode of season 11 of Top Chef, broadcast on 11 March 2020 on M6 and 16 March on RTL-TVI.

Bon Bon was closed in June 2022 and Hardiquest opened a new restaurant, Menssa, on the same site on 7 February 2023

Christophe Hardiquest is a member of the Association des Maîtres-Cuisiniers de Belgique, and of the Grandes Tables du Monde.
