= Roland Licker =

Luxembourgish sprint canoer

Roland Licker (3 February 1932 – 6 January 1974) was a Luxembourgish sprint canoeist who competed in the early 1950s. He was born in Luxembourg City. At the 1952 Summer Olympics in Helsinki, he finished 18th in the K-1 10000 m being eliminated in heats of the K-1 1000 m event.
