= Grand Ducal Palace, Luxembourg =

Official residence of the Grand Duke of Luxembourg

Coordinates: 49°36′39.2″N 06°07′58.2″E

Grand Ducal Palace
- Groussherzogleche Palais
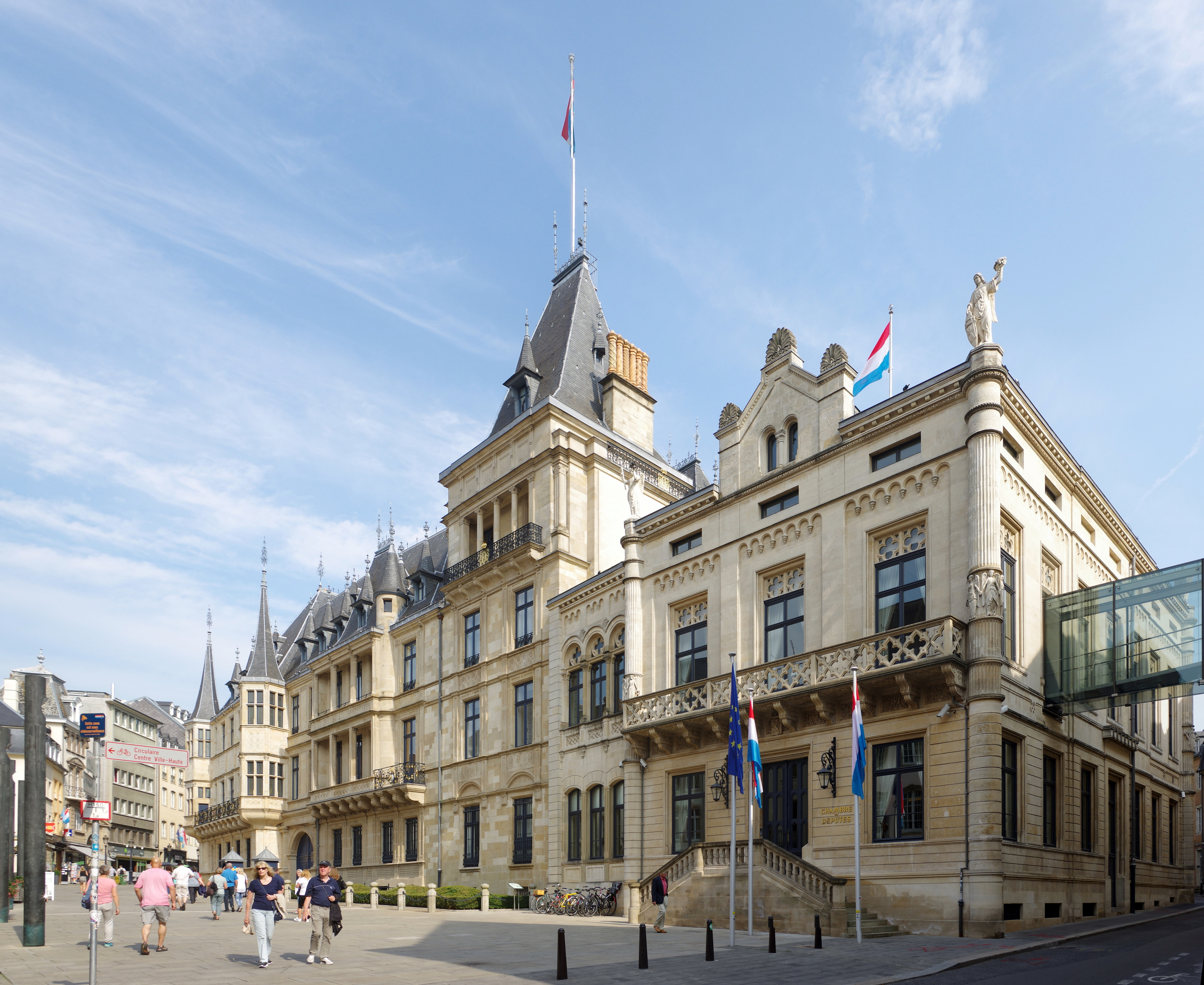
- The façade of the Grand Ducal Palace

General information
- Type: Palace
- Location: Luxembourg City, Luxembourg

The Grand Ducal Palace (Luxembourgish: Groussherzogleche Palais, French: Palais grand-ducal, German: Großherzogliches Palais) is a palace in Luxembourg City, in southern Luxembourg. It is the official residence of the grand duke of Luxembourg, and where he performs most of his duties as head of state of the grand duchy, though his principal residence is Berg Castle, in Colmar-Berg.

== History ==
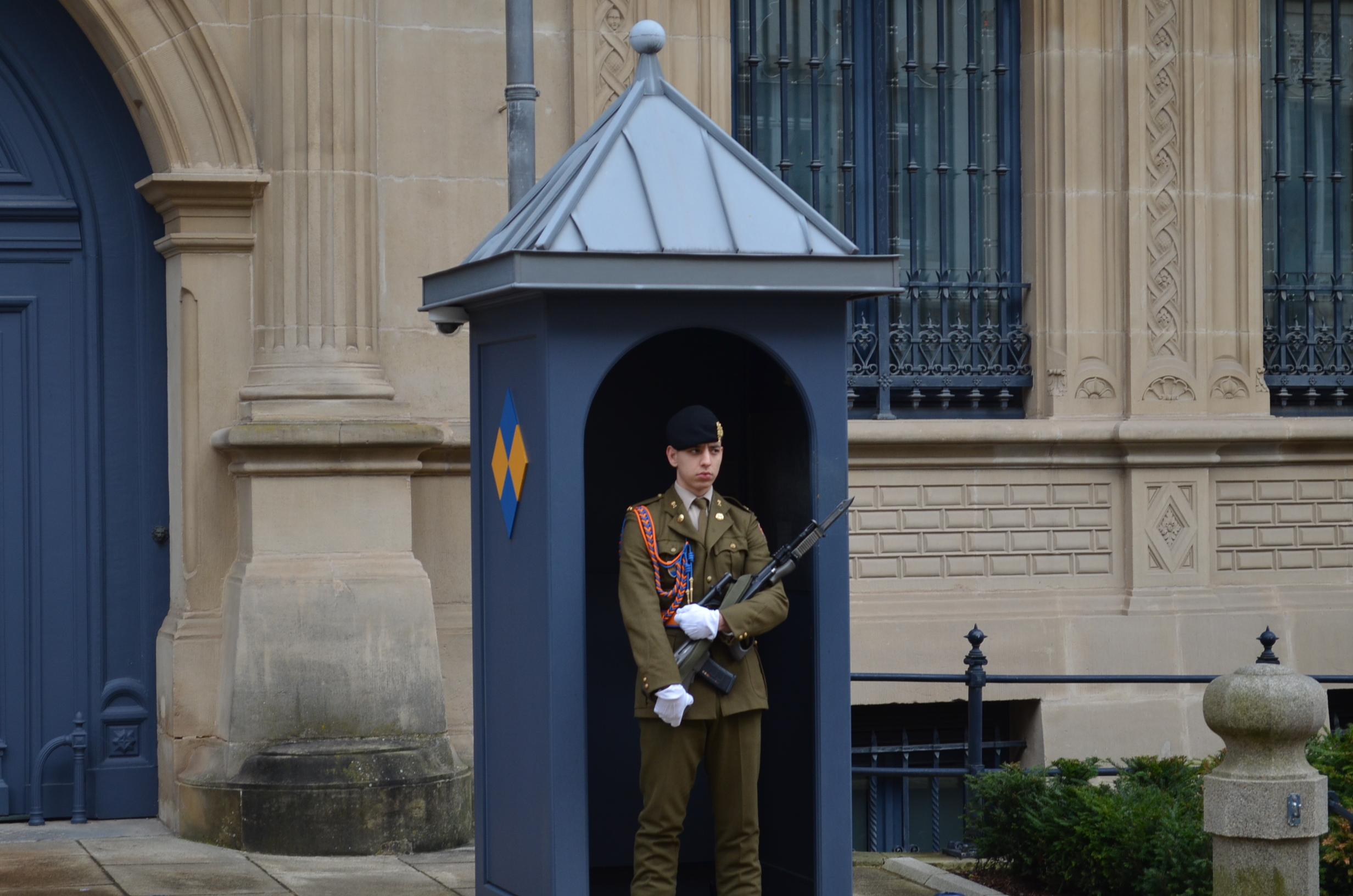
A guard in front of the Palace.

The building was first the city hall of Luxembourg from 1572 to 1795, the seat of the prefecture of the Département des Forêts in 1795, and then the headquarters of the Luxembourg Government in 1817.

From 1817, the palace became the residence of the governor, the representative of the Dutch grand dukes. As such, it was used by Prince Henry, during his time as lieutenant-representative of Luxembourg. The building's interior was renovated in 1883, in preparation of a visit by King William III and Queen Emma, grand duke and grand duchess of Luxembourg.

With the accession of the House of Nassau-Weilburg in 1890, the palace was reserved exclusively for the grand duke and his family. Under Grand Duke Adolphe, it was comprehensively renovated and a new wing, containing family rooms and guest accommodation, was built by the Belgian architect Gédéon Bordiau and the Luxembourgish state architect, Charles Arendt.

During the German occupation of Luxembourg in World War II, the Grand Ducal Palace was used by the Nazis as a concert hall and tavern. Much of the palace's furniture, art collections and jewels were ruined. Large swastika flags were hung down the front. With the return of Grand Duchess Charlotte from exile in 1945, the palace once again became the seat of the grand ducal court.

Under the supervision of Charlotte, the palace was redecorated during the 1960s. It was thoroughly restored between 1991 and 1996. The interior of the palace has been regularly renovated to match modern tastes and standards of comfort.

From 1945 to 1966 the Grand Ducal Guard mounted ceremonial guard duties at the palace. From 1966 to today soldiers of the military of Luxembourg perform guard duties.

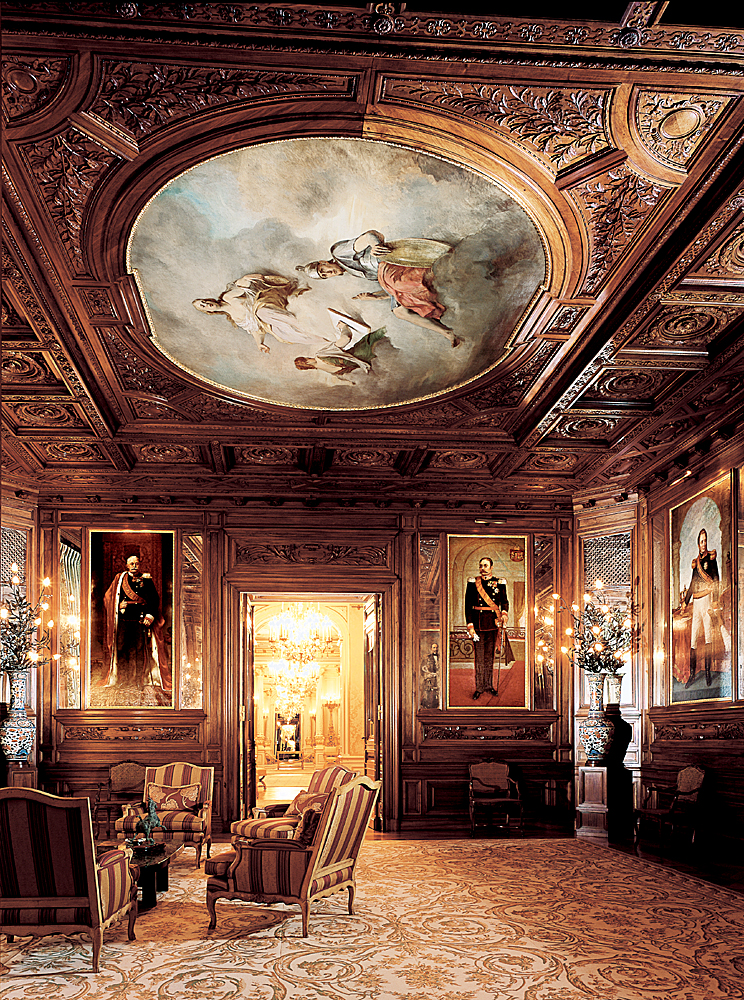
The King's Lounge

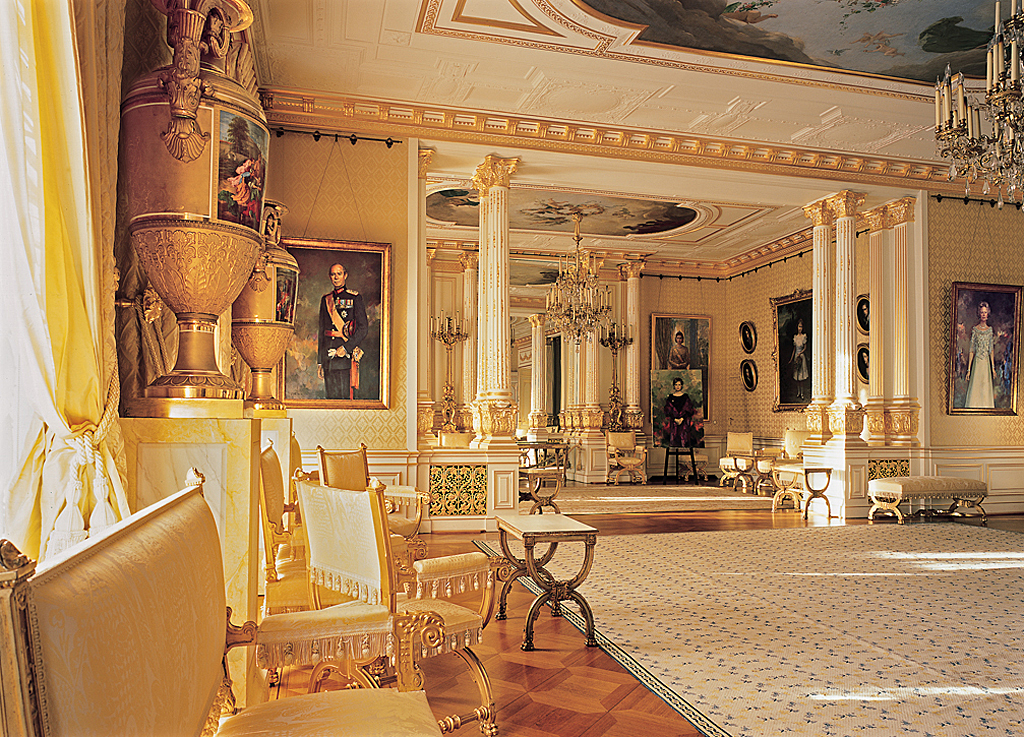
The Ballroom

In December 2024, former Speaker of the United States House of Representatives Nancy Pelosi fell on marble stairs while visiting the palace, and sustained a hip fracture.

== The Palace today ==
As the official residence of the grand duke, the palace is used by him in the exercise of his official functions. He and the Grand Duchess, together with their staff, have their offices at the palace, and the state rooms on the first floor are used for a variety of meetings and audiences. On Christmas Eve, the Grand Duke's Christmas message is broadcast from the Yellow Room.

Foreign heads of state are accommodated at the palace, as guests of the grand duke and grand duchess, during official visits to Luxembourg, and the Ballroom is the setting for state banquets in their honour. Throughout the year, numerous other receptions take place at the palace, such as the New Year's reception given for members of the Government and the Chamber of Deputies.

In the summer months, the palace is open to the public for guided tours. Most years, tours run from mid-July to mid-September with tours offered in Luxembourgish, French, English and German.

== See also ==
- List of castles in Luxembourg
