= Sotnikov =

Sotnikov (masculine, Russian: Сотников) or Sotnikova (feminine, Russian: Сотникова) is a Russian surname. Notable people with the surname include:

- Adelina Sotnikova (born 1996), Russian figure skater
- Alyona Sotnikova (born 1992), Ukrainian tennis player
- Dmitry Sotnikov (born 1984), Russian rally raid truck driver
- Ivan Sotnikov (1913–2004), Soviet sprint canoeist
- Tatiana Sotnikova (born 1981), Russian ice hockey player
- Vera Sotnikova (born 1960), Soviet–Russian actress
- Vladimir Sotnikov (born 2004), Russian Paralympic swimmer
- Yevgen Sotnikov (1980–2021), Ukrainian judoka
- Yuliya Sotnikova (born 1970), Russian sprinter
