= Leon Roth =

Leon Roth may refer to:

- Léon Roth (canoeist), Luxembourgian sprint canoer
- Leon Roth (scholar), English philosopher and historian of philosophy.

== See also ==
- Leon-Henri Roth, resistance fighter
