= Hansruedi Engler =

Swiss canoeist (1928–2011)

Hansruedi Engler (24 March 1928 – 23 December 2011) was a Swiss sprint canoeist who competed in the early 1950s. He competed in the K-1 1000 m event at the 1952 Summer Olympics in Helsinki, but was eliminated in the heats.
