= Grand Ducal Guard =

The Grand Ducal Guard (French: Corps de la Garde Grand-Ducale) was the ceremonial guard unit of the military of Luxembourg from 1945 to 1966.

== History ==
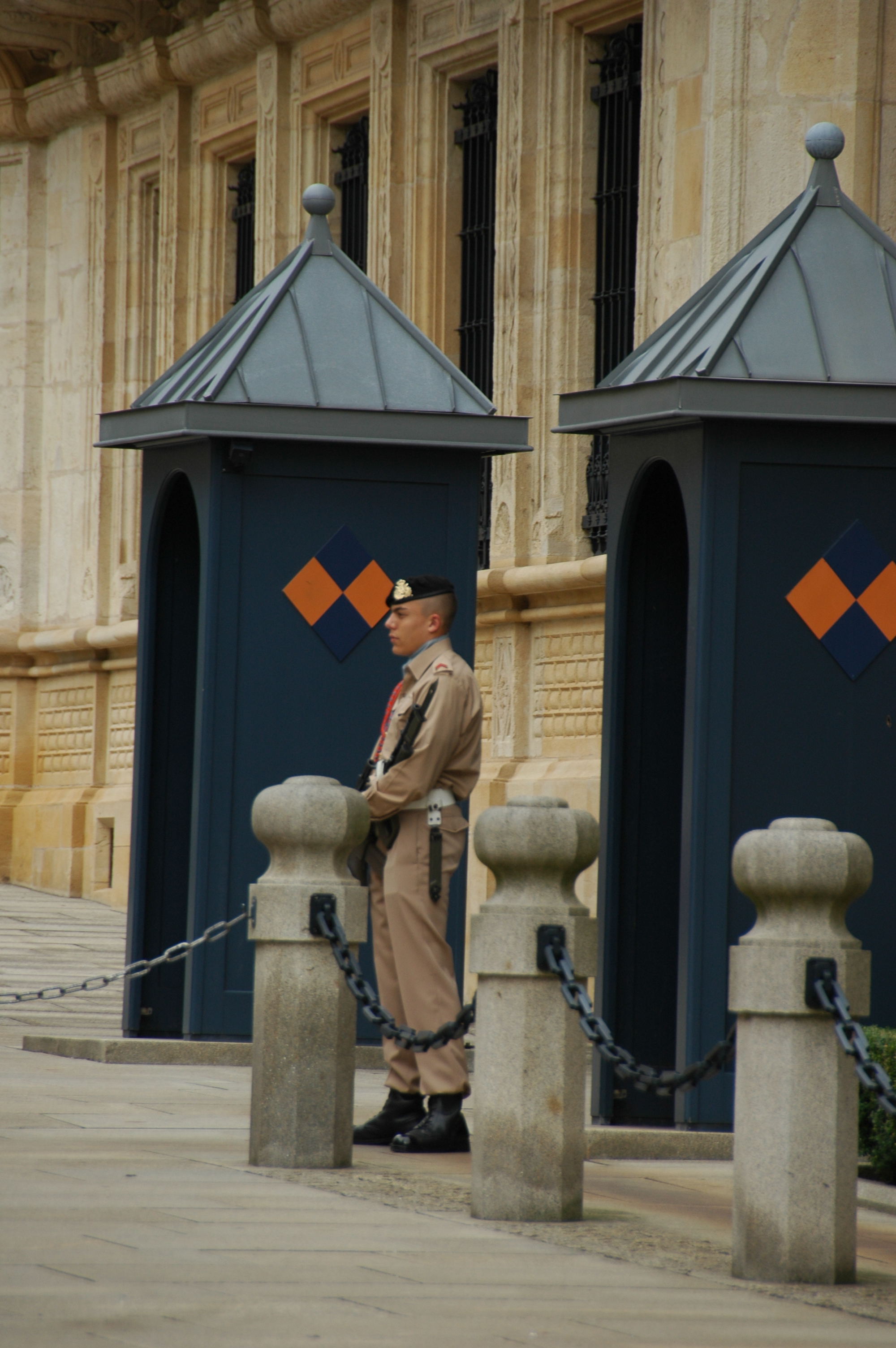
A soldier of the Luxembourg Army standing guard at the palace in 2007

Formed in March 1945 the Company of Guards of 120 men was organised into three platoons. The Company mounted its first postwar guard at the Grand Ducal Palace on 12 April 1945. Though it was planned for the Guard to be at battalion strength, it never was larger than a company. From 1947 the company was referred to as the Corps de la Garde Grand-Ducale.

The Corps performed their final Changing of the Guard at the Palace on 29 January 1966 with the Guard being disbanded on 28 February 1966.

Troops of the Army of Luxembourg perform the duty today, with frequently only one guard visible at the palace.
