= Geoffrey Colyer =

British sprint canoer

Geoffrey John Colyer (born 18 May 1931) is a British canoe sprinter who competed in the early 1950s. At the 1952 Summer Olympics in Helsinki, he finished 12th in the K-1 10000 m event while being eliminated in the heats of the K-1 1000 m event. He was born in Romford, England.
