= Raymond Kamber =

Swiss canoeist

Personal information
- Nationality: Swiss
- Born: 26 December 1929
- Died: 8 January 2010 (aged 80); Dornach, Solothurn, Switzerland

Sport
- Country: Switzerland
- Sport: Canoe sprint
- Event: K-1 10000 m

Raymond Kamber (26 December 1929 – 8 January 2010) was a Swiss canoe sprinter who competed in the early 1950s. He finished 16th in the K-1 10000 m event at the 1952 Summer Olympics in Helsinki.

Kamber was also a sports journalist and chaired the canoe/kayak commission of the International Sport Press Association (AIPS). In 2008, he became an honorary member of the International Canoe Federation.
