= Herrenberg (Luxembourg) =

Coordinates: 49°53′N 6°10′E

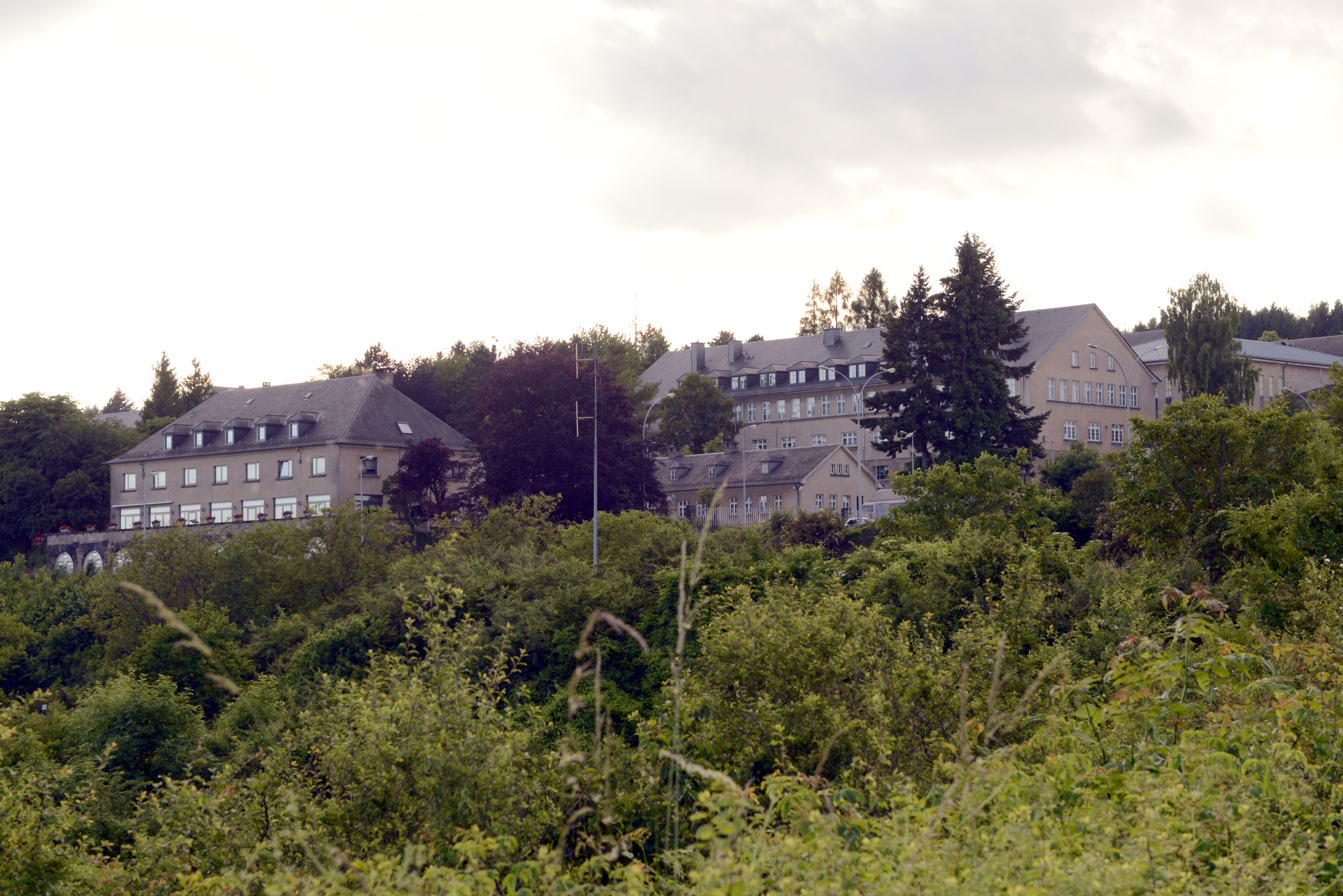
Herrenberg-Barracks

Herrenberg (Luxembourgish: Härebierg) is a hill in the commune of Diekirch, in north-eastern Luxembourg. It is 394 metres (1,293 ft) tall, and lies between the towns of Diekirch, Bastendorf, and Gilsdorf. It is the site of the headquarters of the Luxembourg military, Centre Militaire (Military Centre), located in the "Caserne Grand-Duc Jean" barracks.
