= Lubomír Vambera =

Czechoslovak sprint canoeist

Lubomír Vambera (3 March 1925 – 31 January 2007) was a Czechoslovak sprint canoeist who competed in the late 1940s and early 1950s. Competing in two Summer Olympics, he earned his best finish of sixth in the K-1 1000 m event at Helsinki in 1952.
