= Henri Losch =

Luxembourgish actor, writer, and teacher (1931–2021)

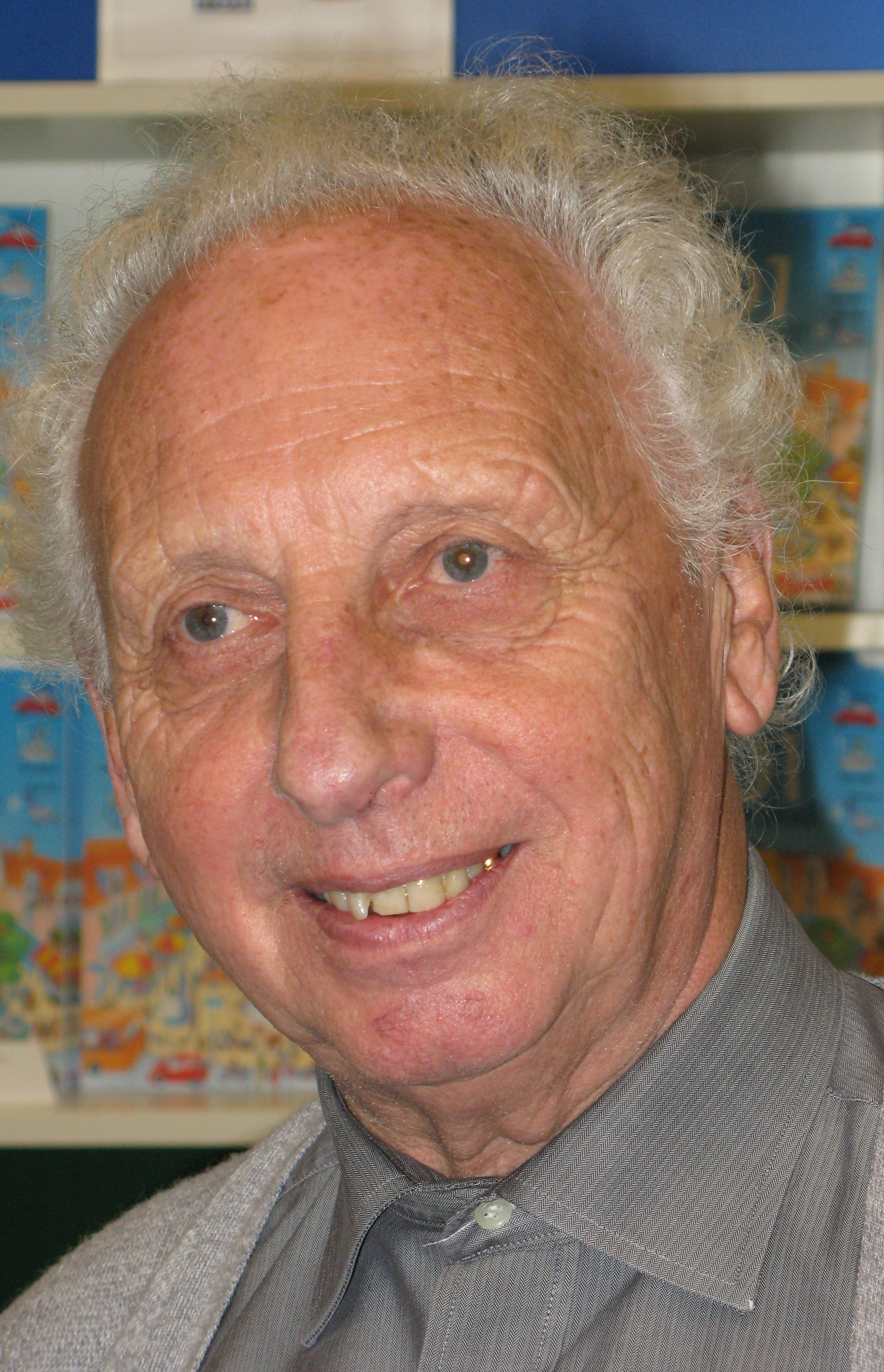
- Born: 16 July 1931; Diekirch, Luxembourg
- Died: 26 December 2021 (aged 90)
- Occupations: Actor; Writer; Teacher

Henri Losch (16 July 1931 – 26 December 2021) was a Luxembourgish actor, writer, and teacher.

== Life and career ==
Losch taught at the Conservatory of Esch-sur-Alzette and acted with the Lëtzebuerger Theater from 1962 to 1973. He worked for RTL and sought to defend the Luxembourgish language.

He died on 26 December 2021, at the age of 90.

== Bibliography ==
- Grouss a Kleng am Krich (1985)
- Eng Zaubertéingeschicht, e musikalescht Mäerchen mam OPL
- Tun Deutsch (1995)
- En drolege Schlasshär (2002)
- Am grujelegen Tunnel (2003)
- E Bouf erzielt (2004)
- En Däiwelsgesiicht (2005)
- Häerzerkinnek. E Krimi (2007)
- Lëtzebuerg, e Land a seng Leit (2007)
- De Geescht an där aler Brauerei e Roman fir Kanner mat Biller vum Patty Thielen (2009)
- Chrëschtdag hautdesdaags, e Chrëschtmusical
- Koppeges a Bosseges. E Schoulmeeschter erzielt (2012)
- D’Rennscheier – E Guide erzielt (2015)
- Mamer Meng Gemeng - Wissenswertes aus Geschichte, Geographie und Kultur (2015)
- Mamer Ma commune - Informations concernant sa géographie, son histoire et sa culture (2015)
- De Kregéiler - E Frënd vun der Natur erzielt (2017)
- Sympatesch Kauzen (2018)

== Filmography ==
- Congé fir e Mord (1983)
- E Fall fir sech (1984)
- Déi zwéi vum Bierg (1985)
- De falschen Hond (1989)
- Mumm Sweet Mumm (1989)
- Three Shake-a-leg Steps to Heaven (1993)
- Lorenz im Land der Lügner (1997)
- Schockela, Knätschgummi a brong Puppelcher (2010)
- D'Belle Époque (2012)
- D'Fifties zu Lëtzebuerg (2013)
- De Superjhemp retörns (2017)
