= Lev Nikitin =

Soviet sprint canoer

Lev Nitikin (1926 – 3 April 1989) was a Soviet sprint canoer who competed in the early 1950s. At the 1952 Summer Olympics in Helsinki, he finished eighth in the K-1 1000 m event.
