= Giorgio Piccinelli =

Italian canoeist 1930–2000

Giorgio Piccinelli (13 January 1930 – 14 October 2000) was an Italian sprint canoer who competed in the early 1950s. He competed in the K-1 1000 m event at the 1952 Summer Olympics in Helsinki, but was eliminated in the heats. He was born in Mariano Comense.

Piccinelli died on 14 October 2000 in Vasto, aged 70.
