= Aldo Albera =

Italian canoeist

Aldo Albera (19 January 1923 – 15 February 2003) was an Italian sprint canoer who competed in the early 1950s. He finished 15th in the K-1 10000 m event at the 1952 Summer Olympics in Helsinki.
