= Michael Budrock =

American canoeist

Michael Burdock (September 3, 1929 – February 13, 1998) was an American sprint canoer who competed in the early 1950s. He competed in the K-1 1000 m event at the 1952 Summer Olympics in Helsinki, but was eliminated in the heats.
