= Canoeing at the 1952 Summer Olympics – Men's K-1 1000 metres =

These are the results of the men's K-1 1000 metres competition in canoeing at the 1952 Summer Olympics. The K-1 event is raced by single-man canoe sprint kayaks. Heat and semifinals took place on July 28.

== Medalists ==
| Gold | Silver | Bronze |
| Gert Fredriksson (SWE) | Thorvald Strömberg (FIN) | Louis Gantois (FRA) |

== Heats ==
The 20 competitors first raced in three heats. The top three finishers in each heat moved directly to the final.

Heat 1
| 1. | Hendrik Vebrygghe (BEL) | 4:27.7 | QF |
| 2. | Lubomir Vambera (TCH) | 4:30.1 | QF |
| 3. | Bert Oldershaw (CAN) | 4:30.7 | QF |
| 4. | Giorgio Piccinelli (ITA) | 4:38.5 |
| 5. | Michael Budrock (USA) | 4:39.5 |
| 6. | Hansruedi Engler (SUI) | 4:39.7 |
| 7. | Geoffrey Colyer (GBR) | 4:39.9 |
Heat 2
| 1. | Wim van der Kroft (NED) | 4:20.3 | QF |
| 2. | Meinrad Mittenberger (GER) | 4:21.2 | QF |
| 3. | Louis Gantois (FRA) | 4:22.2 | QF |
| 4. | Knud Albjerg (DEN) | 4:24.2 |
| 5. | Per Johnsen (NOR) | 4:25.2 |
| 6. | Josip Lipokatič (YUG) | 4:35.2 |
| 7. | Roland Licker (LUX) | 4:48.1 |
Heat 3
| 1. | Thorvald Strömberg (FIN) | 4:15.5 | QF |
| 2. | Lev Nikitin (URS) | 4:17.1 | QF |
| 3. | Gert Fredriksson (SWE) | 4:17.6 | QF |
| 4. | János Urányi (HUN) | 4:20.9 |
| 5. | Herbert Schreiner (AUT) | 4:22.9 |
| 6. | Mircea Anastasescu (ROU) | 4:32.9 |

== Final ==
| Gold | Gert Fredriksson (SWE) | 4:07.9 |
| Silver | Thorvald Strömberg (FIN) | 4:09.7 |
| Bronze | Louis Gantois (FRA) | 4:20.1 |
| 4. | Wim van der Kroft (NED) | 4:20.8 |
| 5. | Meinrad Mittenberger (GER) | 4:21.6 |
| 6. | Lubomir Vambera (TCH) | 4:24.0 |
| 7. | Hendrik Verbrugghe (BEL) | 4:25.0 |
| 8. | Lev Nikitin (URS) | 4:26.2 |
| 9. | Bert Oldershaw (CAN) | 4:26.5 |
