= Diekirch =

Diekirch Dikrech (Luxembourgish)
- Commune
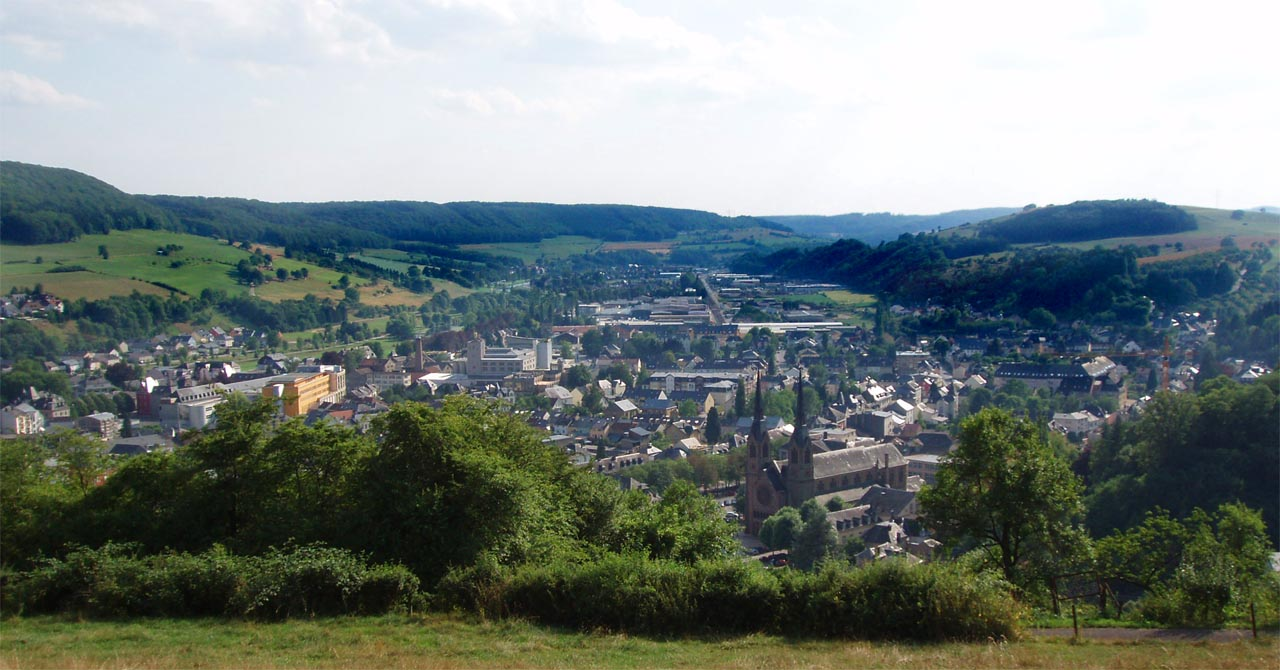

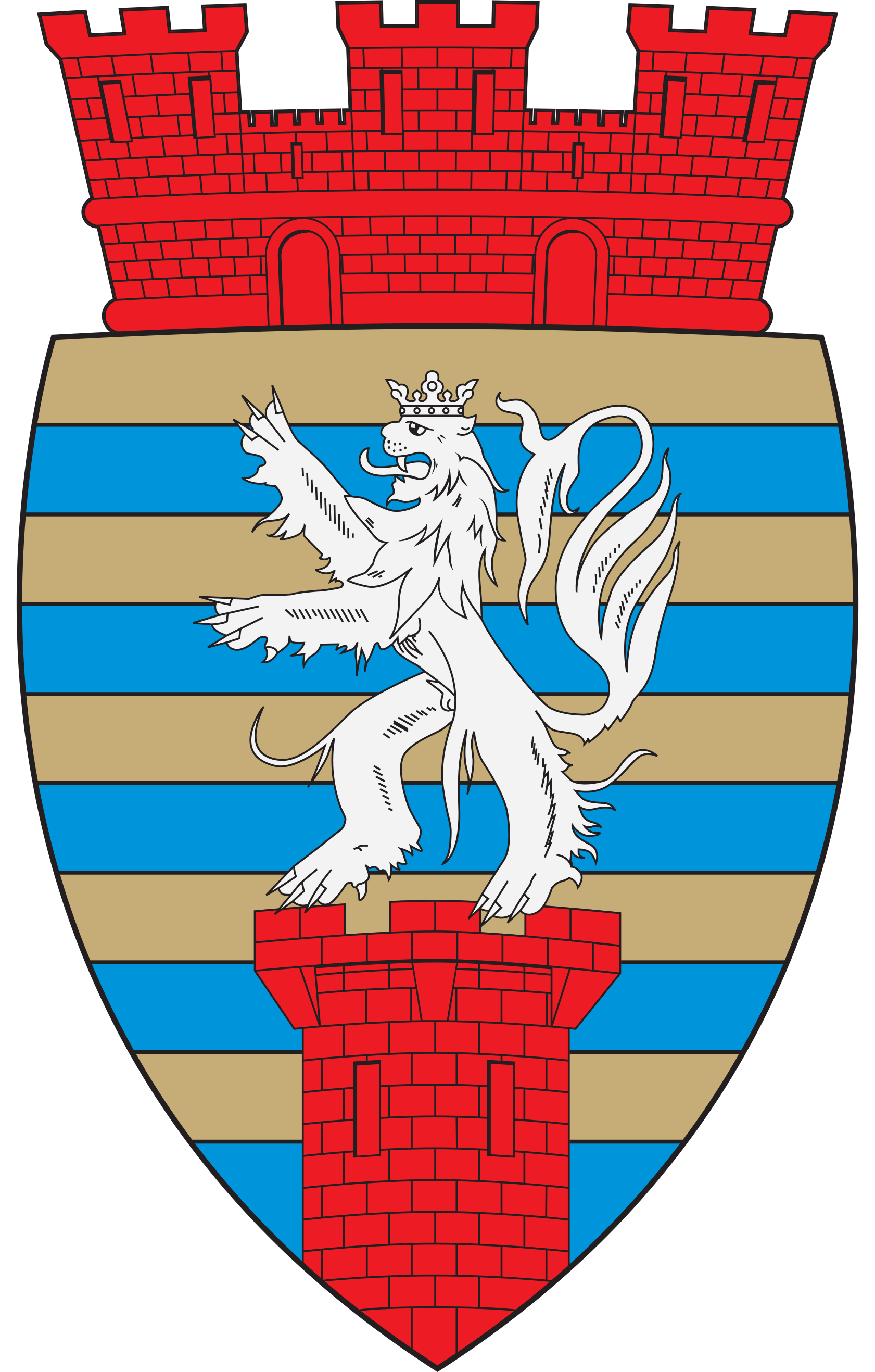
- Flag Coat of arms

- Map of Luxembourg with Diekirch highlighted in orange, and the canton in dark red
- Interactive map of Diekirch
- Coordinates: 49.8681°N 6.1567°E
- Country: Luxembourg
- Canton: Diekirch

Government
  - Mayor: Charles Weiler (CSV)

Area
  - Total: 12.42 km^{2} (4.80 sq mi)
  - Rank: 87th of 100
- Highest elevation: 396 m (1,299 ft)
  - Rank: 54th of 100
- Lowest elevation: 187 m (614 ft)
  - Rank: 20th of 100

Population (2025)
  - Total: 7,336
  - Rank: 21st of 100
  - Density: 590.7/km^{2} (1,530/sq mi)
  - Rank: 16th of 100
- Time zone: UTC+1 (CET)
  - Summer (DST): UTC+2 (CEST)
- LAU 2: LU0000603
- Website: diekirch.lu

Diekirch (French pronunciation: [dikiʁʃ]; German pronunciation: [ˈdiːkɪʁç]; Luxembourgish: Dikrech [ˈdikʀəɕ] or (locally) Dikrich [ˈdikʀiɕ]; from Diet-Kirch, i.e. "people's church") is a commune with city status in north-eastern Luxembourg, in the canton of Diekirch and, until its abolition in 2015, the district of Diekirch. The town is situated on the banks of the Sauer river.

The town's heraldic shield, showing a crowned lion on a castle, was granted in 1988. It is based on the town's 14th-century seal and arms.

In 1977, Diekirch became the first town in Luxembourg to have a pedestrian zone.

Diekirch is home to a brewery of national importance carrying the town's name.

Three secondary schools are located in Diekirch: Lycée classique de Diekirch, Lycée technique hôtelier Alexis Heck and Nordstadlycée.

The town is home to the national operational headquarters of the Luxembourgish Army at the Haerebierg Military Centre (located on the hill Herrenberg) and the National Museum of Military History, reflecting Diekirch's pivotal role in the Battle of the Bulge, a major battle of World War II. It was here that the river Sauer was crossed on the night of January 18, 1945, by the US 5th Infantry division.

The town is also the seat of one of the six regional headquarters of the Grand Ducal Police and one of Luxembourg's two judicial districts.

== History ==
The town received its name, according to old sources, when Charlemagne in the late 8th century resettled Saxons, in order to bring them under his control. One of the centres of these settlements was in the area of Diekirch. In order to convert the pagan Saxons to Christianity, a church was built, which gave the settlement its name: "Diet-Kirch" ("people's church"). In Old Franconian, thioda (Old High German: "diota" – the people). Þeudō is a reconstructed word from Germanic, which plays a role in the etymology of the term "Deutsch".

In the 14th century, John the Blind, King of Bohemia and Count of Luxembourg, fortified it, surrounding the place with a castellated wall and a ditch supplied by a stream. It remained more or less fortified until the beginning of the 19th century when the French, during their occupation, levelled the old walls and substituted avenues of trees.

In the course of extensive excavation in the 1960s, it was shown that the St. Laurence church is a Roman building. In the early 20th century, wall ruins and mosaics were found north of the town center. Archaeological investigations in 1992–1993, 1999, and 2008 enabled the reconstruction of a large Roman villa, which extended over all the land of the medieval town and was abandoned in the early 5th century.

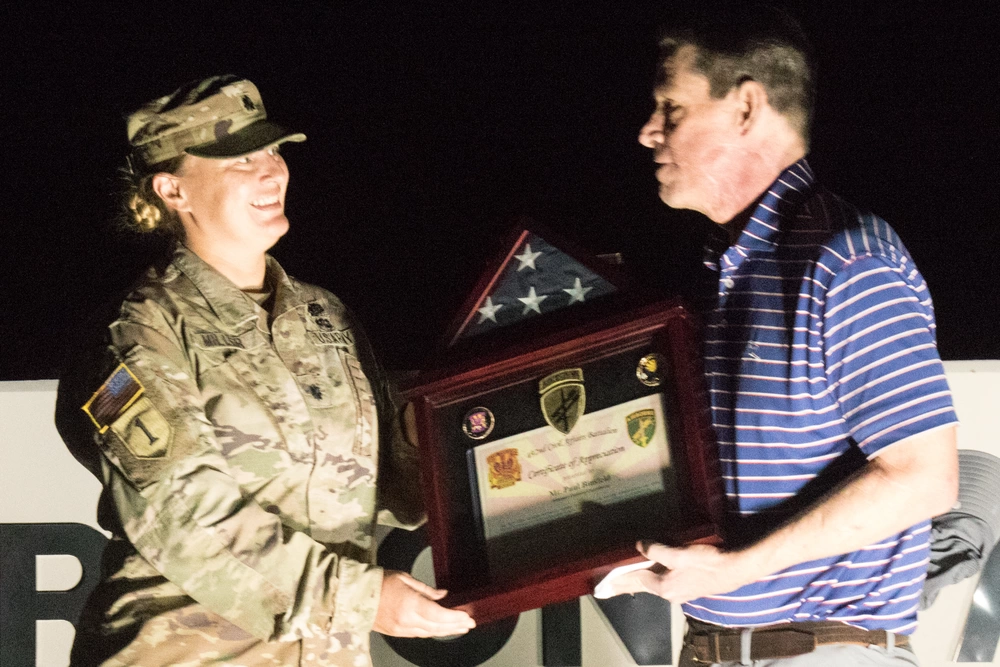
LTC Laura Miller, Commander of the 492nd Civil Affairs Battalion with Paul Binsfeld, the Luxembourg honorary Consul prior to the Marche Internationale de Diekirch event in Buckeye, Arizona 2022.

== Sport ==
Diekirch hosts the "International March of Diekirch", a 20 km up to 40 km road walking event. Held since 1968, it is open to both the military and civilians, with finishers earning the Medal of the "Marche de L’Armée", a Luxembourgish Army award. The marches of 2020 and 2021 were canceled due to the Coronavirus Pandemic, and held as a virtual event in 2022, with the distances walked in different locations across the world. The march drew significant interest from service members across NATO countries. This included the United States Army, with the 492nd Civil Affairs Battalion based out of Buckeye, Arizona hosting the largest individual marching event in the United States that year. In 2023 the march returned to being only held as a live event in Diekirch.

Diekirch has an annual cross country running competition — the Eurocross — which is an IAAF permit meeting and attracts world-class runners, with Gabriela Szabo and Irina Mikitenko among past winners.

== Mascot ==
The town's mascot is the donkey. There is a donkey fountain in the centre of Diekirch. The yearly cavalcade (carnival procession) is held under the sign of the donkey.

== Population ==
Historical population

Year	Pop.	±%
1821	1,793	—
1851	2,846	+58.7%
1900	3,838	+34.9%
1910	3,777	−1.6%
1922	3,590	−5.0%
1935	3,842	+7.0%

Year	Pop.	±%
1947	3,809	−0.9%
1960	4,397	+15.4%
1970	5,059	+15.1%
1981	5,585	+10.4%
1990	5,549	−0.6%
2000	5,786	+4.3%

Year	Pop.	±%
2005	6,268	+8.3%
2010	6,390	+1.9%
2015	6,728	+5.3%
2020	7,042	+4.7%
2021	7,047	+0.1%

Source data

== Notable people ==
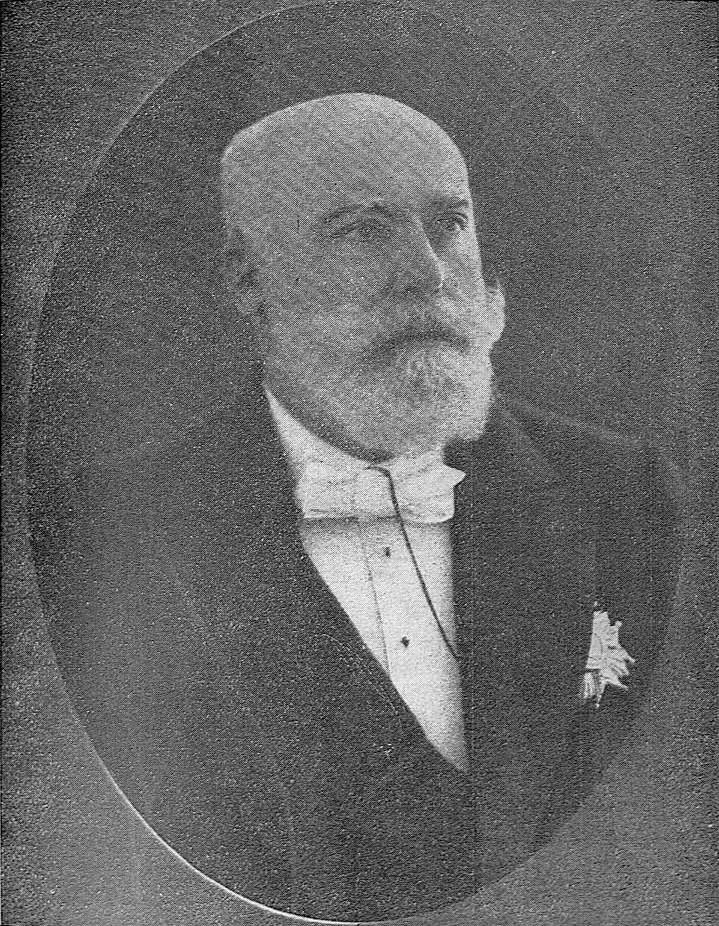
Paul Eyschen

- Paul Eyschen (1841–1915), a Luxembourgish politician, statesman, lawyer and diplomat. He was the 8th Prime Minister of Luxembourg, serving for 27 years, 1888–1915.
- Alphonse Munchen (1850–1917), a Luxembourgish engineer and politician; Mayor of Luxembourg City from 1904 to 1915.
- Joseph Bech (1887–1975), a Luxembourgish politician and lawyer. He was the 15th Prime Minister of Luxembourg, serving for 11 years, from 1926 to 1937.
- Henri Losch (1931–2021), a Luxembourgish actor, writer, and teacher.
- Ali Kaes (born 1955) a Luxembourgish politician, mayor of Tandel
- General Gaston Reinig (born 1956) a Luxembourgish soldier and a former Chief of Defence of the Luxembourg Army

=== Sport ===
- Alfred Albert Joe de Re la Gardiur (1881–1941), a Professional wrestler.
- Léon Roth (born 1926) a Luxembourgish sprint canoer, competed in the 1952 Summer Olympics
- Johnny Lucas (1931–1993) a Luxembourgish sprint canoer, competed in the 1952 Summer Olympics
- Michael Pinto (born 1993) a Portuguese footballer, played over 250 games and 31 for Luxembourg

== Twin towns ==
Diekirch is twinned with:

- Arlon, Belgium
- Bitburg, Germany since 1962
- Hayange, France
- Liberty, United States
- Monthey, Switzerland

== Gallery ==
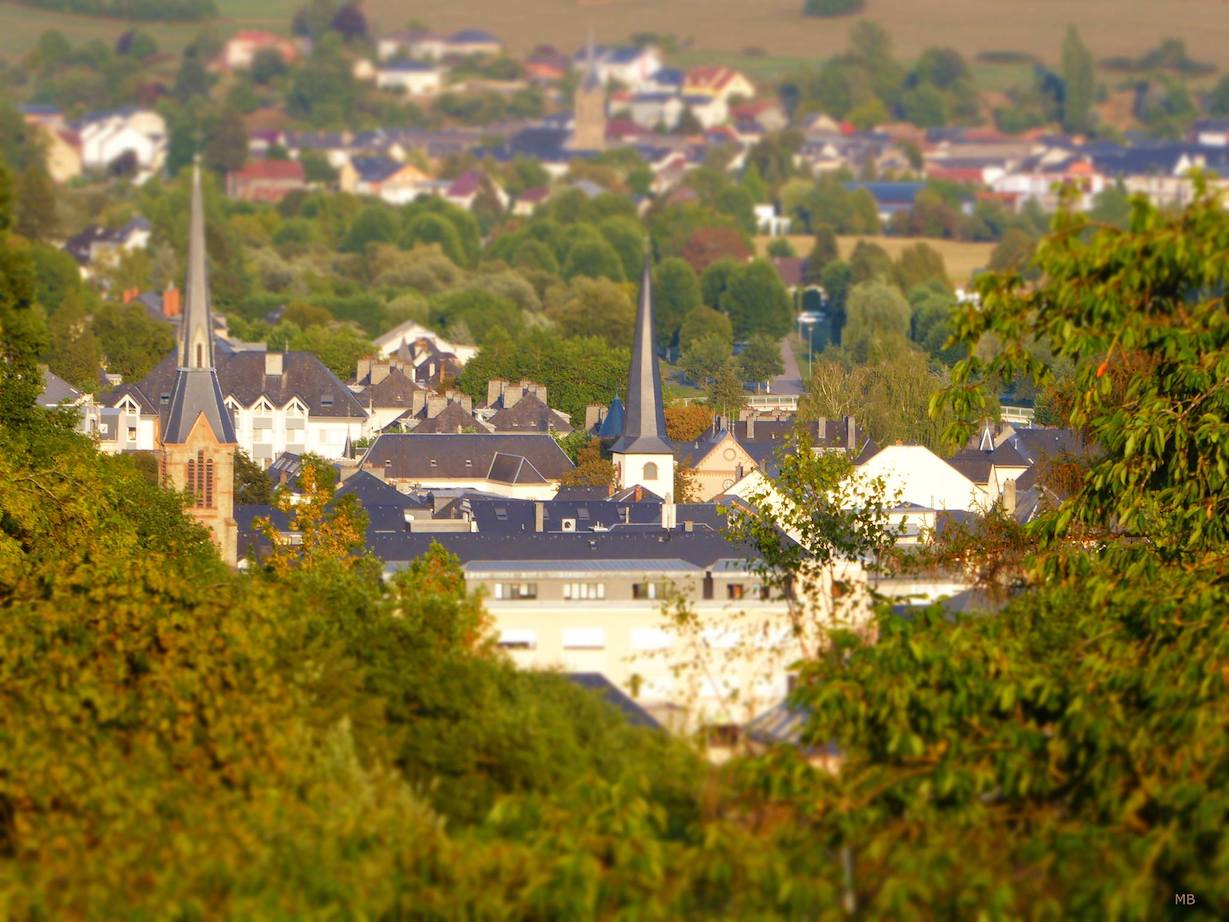
Diekirch city centre

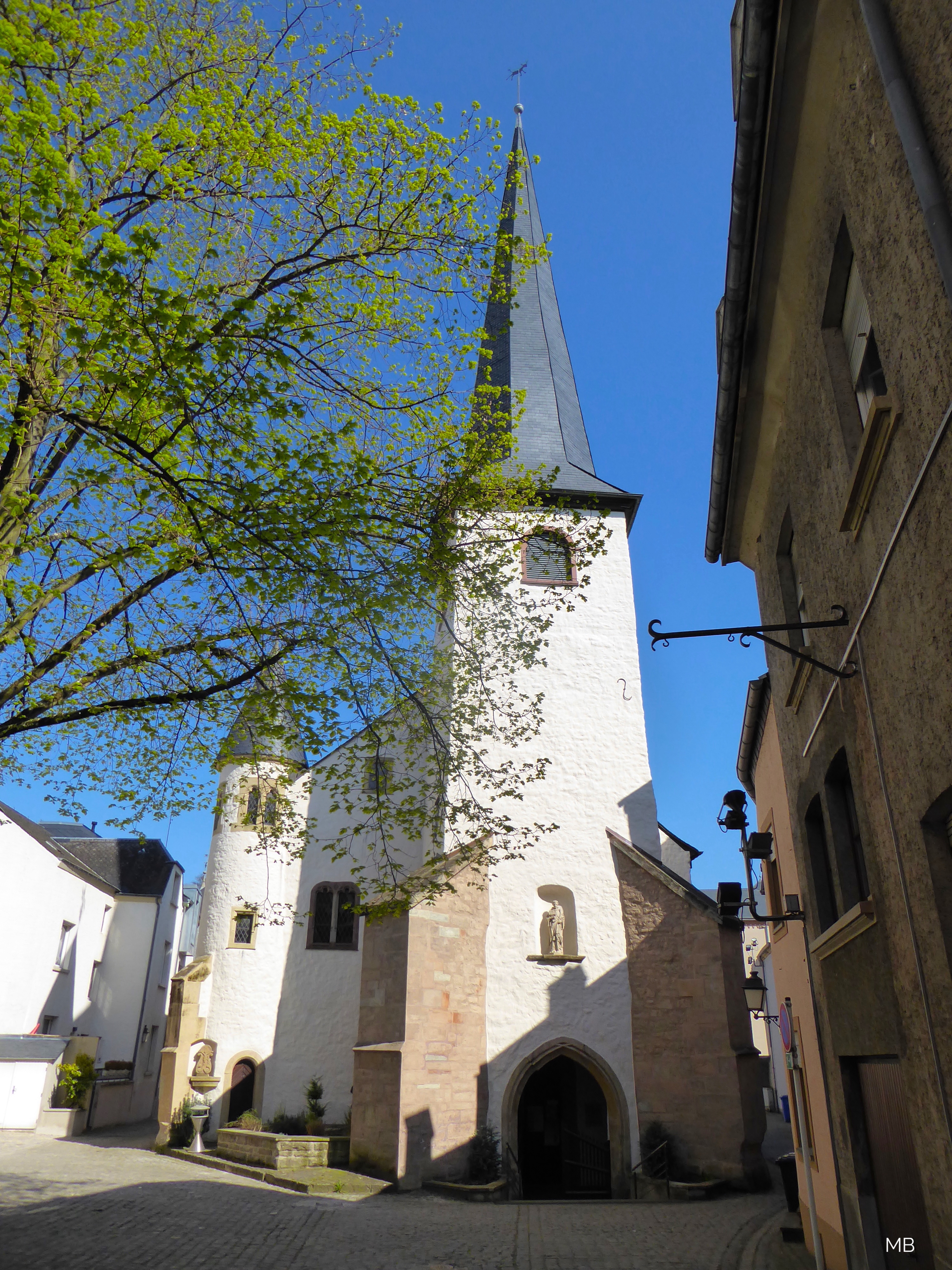
The Old Church of St Lawrence was built on a Gallo Roman base

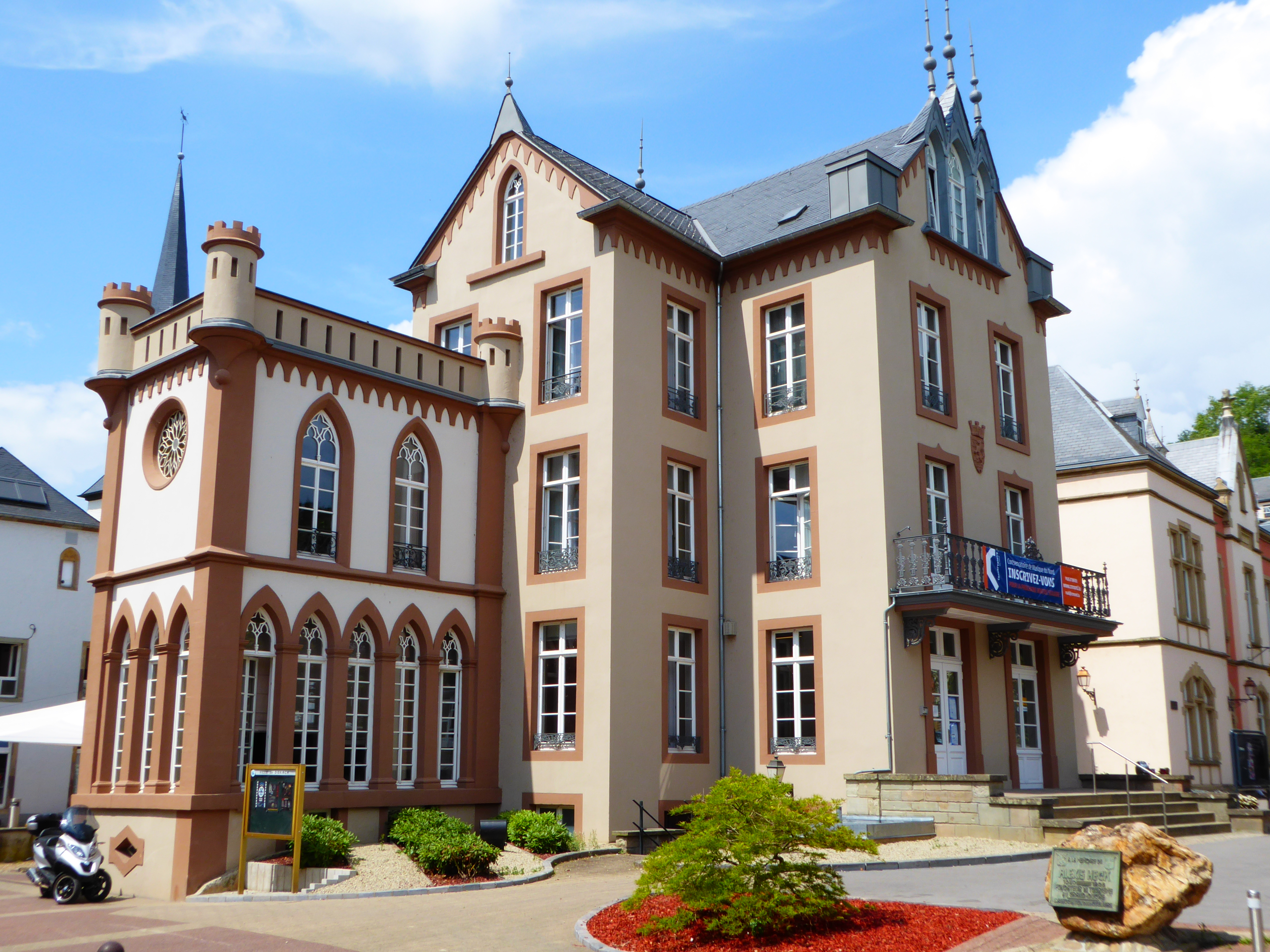
The Wirtgensschlass or Schloss Wirtgen is nowadays used as one building of the conservatory of music.

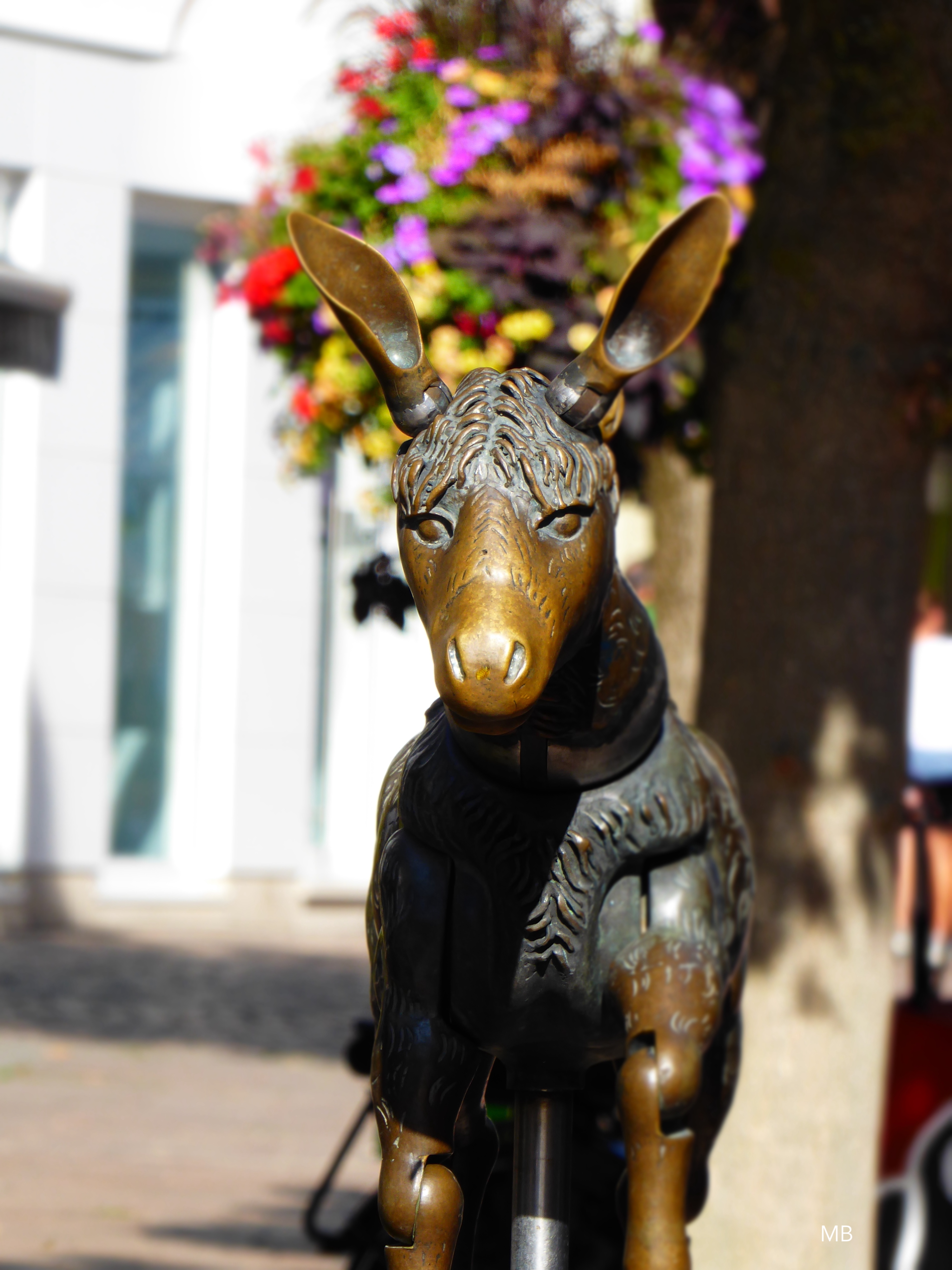
Detail of one of the donkey fountains in the city centre

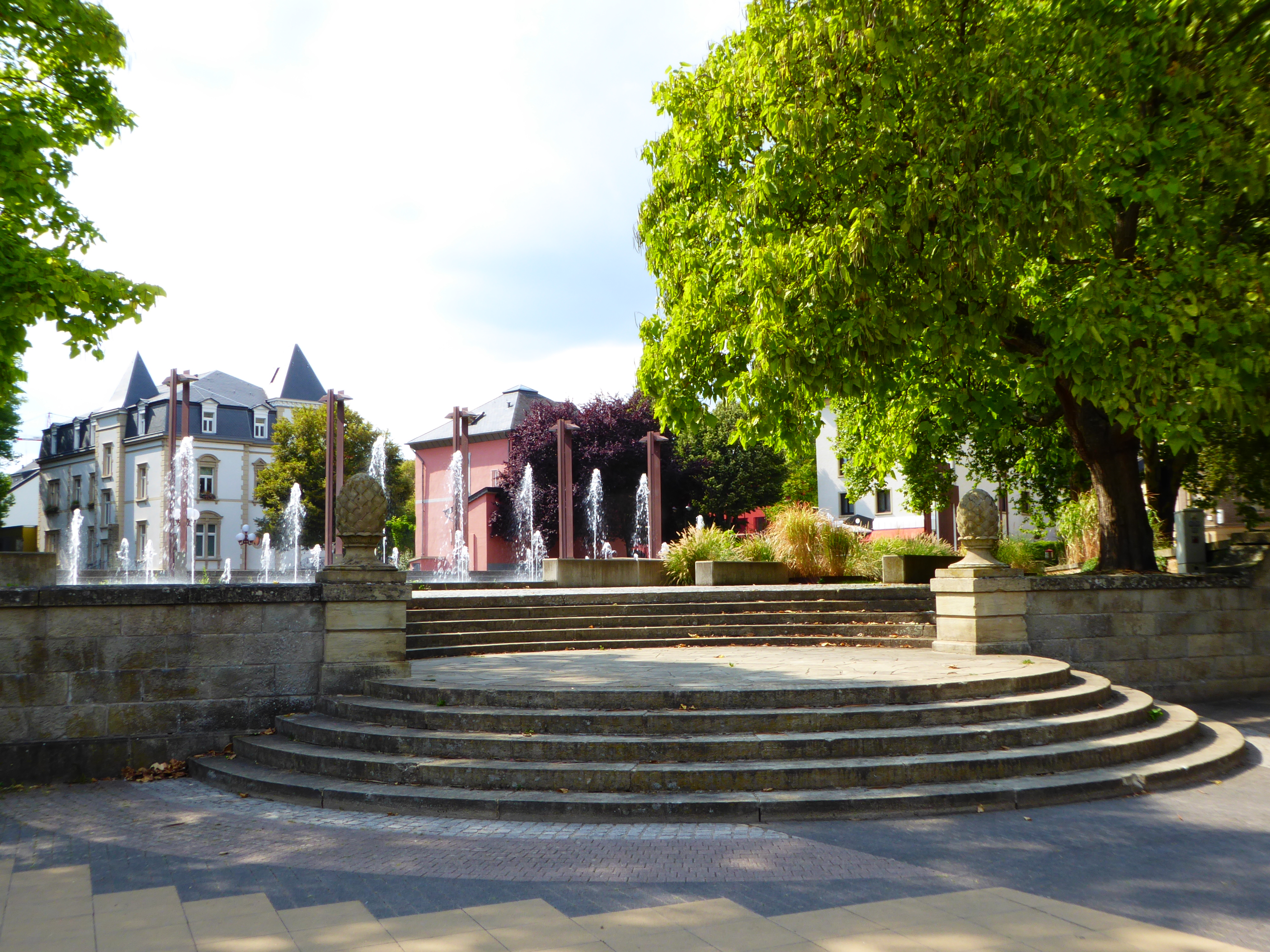
Fountains in the municipal park

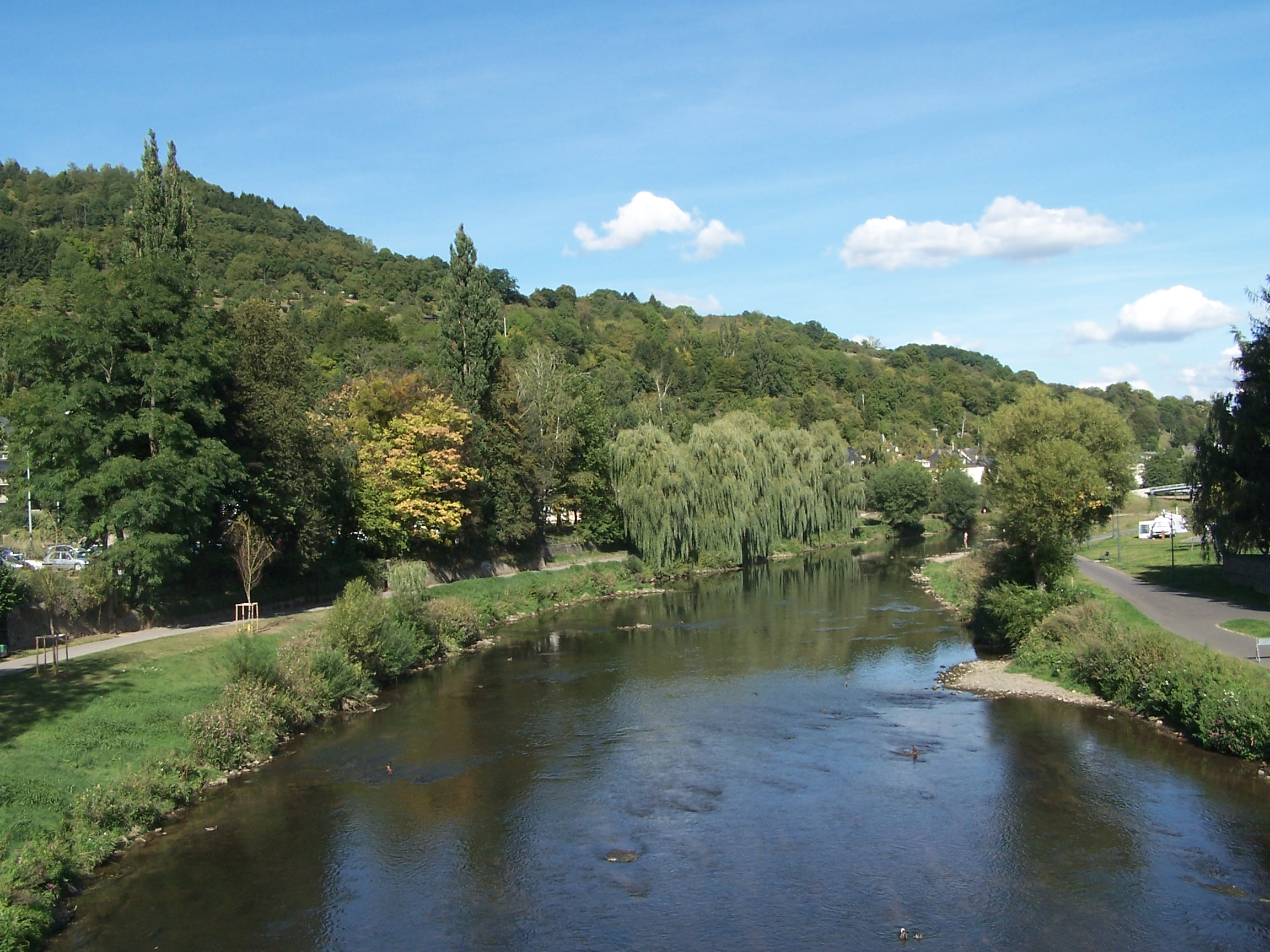
The Sauer river flows through Diekirch.
