= Per Johnsen =

Norwegian canoeist (1926–2018)

Per Johnsen (2 September 1926 – 29 July 2018) was a Norwegian sprint canoer who competed in the early 1950s. At the 1952 Summer Olympics in Helsinki, he was eliminated in heats of the K-1 1000 m event.
