= Thorvald Strömberg =

Finnish canoeist

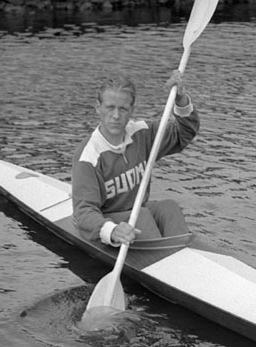
- Strömberg at the 1952 Olympics

Personal information
- Born: 17 March 1931 Kirkkonummi, Finland
- Died: 9 December 2010 (aged 79) Ekenäs, Finland

Sport
- Sport: Canoe sprint
- Club: Kanotklubben Wågen, Raseborg
Medal record
Representing Finland
Olympic Games
Gold medal – first place	1952 Helsinki	K-1 10000 m
Silver medal – second place	1952 Helsinki	K-1 1000 m
World Championships
Gold medal – first place	1950 Copenhagen	K-1 10000 m
Gold medal – first place	1958 Prague	K-1 10000 m
Silver medal – second place	1950 Copenhagen	K-1 1000 m

Lennart Thorvald Strömberg (17 March 1931 – 9 December 2010) was a Finnish sprint canoeist who competed at the 1952 and 1956 Olympics in the individual 1000 m and 10,000 m events. He won a gold and a silver medal in 1952 and placed fourth over 10,000 m in 1956.

Strömberg also won three medals at the ICF Canoe Sprint World Championships with two golds (K-1 10000 m: 1950, 1958) and a silver (K-1 1000 m: 1950).

After retiring from competitions Strömberg was the chairman of his canoe club in Ekenäs and a member of the Finnish canoe/kayak federation. In 2000, he received a Pro-sports award from the Finnish ministry of education.
