= Josip Lipokatić =

Josip Lipokatić (born 13 November 1921; date of death unknown), was a Yugoslav sprint canoeist from Maribor who competed in the early 1950s. At the 1952 Summer Olympics in Helsinki, he finished 13th in the K-1 10000 m event while being eliminated in heats of the K-1 1000 m event..
