= Knud Albjerg =

Danish canoeist

Personal information
- Full name: Knud Thormod Albjerg
- Nationality: Danish
- Born: 16 November 1929 Ting Jellinge, Næstved, Denmark
- Died: 28 September 2003 (aged 73) Slagelse, Sjælland, Denmark

Sport
- Country: Denmark
- Club: Odense Kajakklub, Odense

Knud Albjerg (16 November 1929 – 28 September 2003) was a Danish sprint canoeist who competed in the early 1950s. At the 1952 Summer Olympics in Helsinki, he was eliminated in heats of the K-1 1000 m event.

== Biography ==
=== Early life ===
Knud Thormod Albjerg was born on 16 November 1929 in Ting Jellinge near Næstved on the island of Sjælland, Denmark. He later became involved in competitive canoeing and joined Odense Kajakklub, which was an important centre for Danish sprint kayaking during the period.

=== Canoeing career ===
Albjerg trained and competed with Odense Kajakklub in the early 1950s and became part of the Danish sprint canoeing community during the post-war period. His performances at club and regional level led to his selection for international competition, although detailed records of domestic results from this period remain limited.

He represented Denmark at the 1952 Summer Olympics in Helsinki in the men's K-1 1000 metres event. Competing at the Taivallahti course, Albjerg finished fourth in his heat with a time of 4:24.2 and did not advance to the final, which was reserved for the top three finishers in each heat.

=== Later life ===
After his Olympic appearance, Albjerg did not participate in further major international canoeing competitions. In the mid-1950s he briefly competed in amateur boxing events in Odense, including the Fyn championship tournaments, representing Odense Amatør Bokseklub.

Outside sport, Albjerg worked professionally as a tinsmith. He married Britta Albjerg, and the couple had two children. The family later lived in the Slagelse area on the island of Zealand.

=== Death and legacy ===
Knud Albjerg died on 28 September 2003 in Slagelse, Denmark, at the age of 73. He is buried at Skælskør Kirkegård. His legacy is primarily connected to his participation in the 1952 Olympic Games as part of the early generation of Danish post-war Olympic canoeists.
