= Louis Gantois =

French canoeist

Medal record

Men's canoe sprint

Olympic Games
Bronze medal – third place	1952 Helsinki	K-1 1000 m

World Championships
Silver medal – second place	1954 Mâcon	K-1 1000 m
Bronze medal – third place	1954 Mâcon	K-4 1000 m

Louis Gantois (15 November 1929 – 26 February 2011) was a French sprint canoeist who competed in the early to mid-1950s. He won a bronze medal in the K-1 1000 m event at the 1952 Summer Olympics in Helsinki. Gantois also won two medals at the 1954 ICF Canoe Sprint World Championships in Mâcon with a silver in the K-1 1000 m and a bronze in the K-4 1000 m events.
