= Military ranks of Luxembourg =

The Military ranks of Luxembourg are the military insignia used by the Luxembourg Army. Luxembourg has an air force but no navy. The insignia is inspired by the British ranks.

== Commissioned Officers ==
The rank insignia of commissioned officers.

Special ranks	Général
Combat uniform
Service uniform
	Commandant en Chef (Note: Rank reserved to the Grand Duke in his quality of Commander in Chief.)	Chef d'État-Major (post September 2017)	Chef d'État-Major (pre September 2017)

NATO code	OF-10	OF-9	OF-8	OF-7	OF-6	OF-5	OF-4	OF-3	OF-2	OF-1
Combat uniform
Luxembourg Army
Luxembourg Army					Général	Colonel	Lieutenant-colonel	Major	Capitaine	Lieutenant en premier	Lieutenant
NATO code	OF-10	OF-9	OF-8	OF-7	OF-6	OF-5	OF-4	OF-3	OF-2	OF-1

=== Student officer ranks ===
Rank group	Student officer
Luxembourg Army
Luxembourg Army	Aspirant-officier

== Enlisted ==
The rank insignia of non-commissioned officers and enlisted personnel.

NATO code	OR-9		OR-8	OR-7	OR-6	OR-5	OR-4		OR-3		OR-2		OR-1
Combat uniform
Luxembourg Army
Luxembourg Army	Adjudant-major	Adjudant-chef	Adjudant	Sergent-chef	Premier sergent	Sergent	Premier caporal-chef	Caporal-chef	Caporal de première classe	Caporal	Premier soldat-chef	Soldat-chef	Soldat de première classe	Soldat
NATO code	OR-9		OR-8	OR-7	OR-6	OR-5	OR-4		OR-3		OR-2		OR-1

Special ranks

Rank group	Senior appointments
Luxembourg Army
Luxembourg Army	Adjudant-Major - Adjudant de Corps

== Historical ranks ==
Officers

NATO code	OF-10	OF-9	OF-8	OF-7	OF-6	OF-5	OF-4	OF-3	OF-2	OF-1
Luxembourg Army c. 1988
Luxembourg Army c. 1988						Colonel	Lieutenant-colonel	Major	Capitaine	Lieutenant en premier	Lieutenant

Student officer ranks

Rank group	Student officer
Luxembourg Army c. 1988
Luxembourg Army c. 1988	Aspirant-officier

Enlisted

NATO code	OR-9		OR-8	OR-7	OR-6	OR-5	OR-4	OR-3	OR-2	OR-1
Luxembourg Army c. 1988
Luxembourg Army c. 1988	Adjudant-major	Adjudant-chef	Adjudant	Sergent-chef	Premier sergent	Sergent	Caporal-chef	Caporal		Soldat de première classe	Soldat

Rank group	Senior appointments
Luxembourg Army c. 1988
Luxembourg Army c. 1988	Adjudant de Corps
