= Herbert Schreiner =

Austrian canoeist (1931–2025)

Herbert Schreiner (23 January 1931 – 20 August 2025) was an Austrian sprint canoer who competed in the early 1950s. At the 1952 Summer Olympics in Helsinki, he was eliminated in the heats of the K-1 1000 m event.

Schreiner died on 20 August 2025, at the age of 94.
