= Luxembourg Armed Forces =

National military force of Luxembourg

- Lëtzebuerger Arméi; Armée luxembourgeoise
- Luxembourg Armed Forces emblem
- Founded: 16 December 1881 (145 years, 259 days)
- Current form: 29 June 1967 (59 years, 126 days)
- Headquarters: Military Centre "Caserne Grand-Duc Jean", Diekirch

Leadership
- Grand Duke: Guillaume V
- Minister for Defence: Yuriko Backes
- Chief of Defence: Colonel Claude Robinet

Personnel
- Military age: 18–26
- Active personnel: 1,200 (2026)

Expenditure
- Budget: 1.254 billion Euro (2025)
- Percent of GDP: 2.00% (2025)

Related articles
- History: Military history of Luxembourg
- Ranks: Military ranks of Luxembourg

The Luxembourg Armed Forces (Luxembourgish: Lëtzebuerger Arméi; French: Armée luxembourgeoise) are the national military force of Luxembourg. The army has been a fully volunteer military since 1967. As of 2024, it has 1,197 personnel.

The army is under civilian control, with the grand duke as commander-in-chief. The minister for defence, currently Yuriko Backes, oversees army operations. The professional head of the army is the Chief of Defence, who answers to the minister and holds the rank of general. The current office holder is General Steve Thull.

Luxembourg has provided military personnel for UN, NATO and EU peacekeeping missions since 1992. It has been a member of Eurocorps since 1994.

== History ==
=== Militia (1817–1841) ===
On 8 January 1817, William I, Grand Duke of Luxembourg, published a constitutional law governing the organization of a militia, the main provisions of which were to remain in force until the militia was abolished in 1881. The law fixed the militia's strength at 3,000 men. Until 1840, Luxembourg's militiamen served in units of the Royal Netherlands Army. Enlisted men served for five years: the first year consisted of active service, but during each of the subsequent four years of service they were mobilised only three times per year.

=== Federal Contingent (1841–1867) ===
In 1839, William I became a party to the Treaty of London by which the Grand-Duchy lost its western, francophone territories to the Belgian province of Luxembourg. Due to the country's population having been halved, with the loss of 160,000 inhabitants, the militia lost half its strength. Under the terms of the treaty, Luxembourg and the newly formed Duchy of Limburg, both members of the German Confederation, were together required to provide a federal contingent consisting of a light infantry battalion garrisoned in Echternach, a cavalry squadron in Diekirch, and an artillery detachment in Ettelbruck. In 1846, the cavalry and artillery units were disbanded and the Luxembourg contingent was separated from that of Limburg. The Luxembourg contingent now consisted of two light infantry battalions, one in Echternach and the second in Diekirch; two reserve companies; and a depot company.

In 1866, the Austro-Prussian War resulted in the dissolution of the German Confederation. Luxembourg was declared neutral in perpetuity by the 1867 Treaty of London, and in accordance, its fortress was demolished in the following years. In 1867, the Prussian garrison left the fortress, and the two battalions of Luxembourg light infantry entered the city of Luxembourg that September.

A new military organization was established in 1867, consisting of two battalions, known as the Corps des Chasseurs Luxembourgeois, having a total strength of 1,568 officers and men. In 1868, the contingent came to consist of one light infantry battalion of four companies, with a strength of 500 men. On 16 February 1881, the light infantry battalion was disbanded with the abolition of the militia-based system.

=== Gendarmes and Volunteers Corps ===
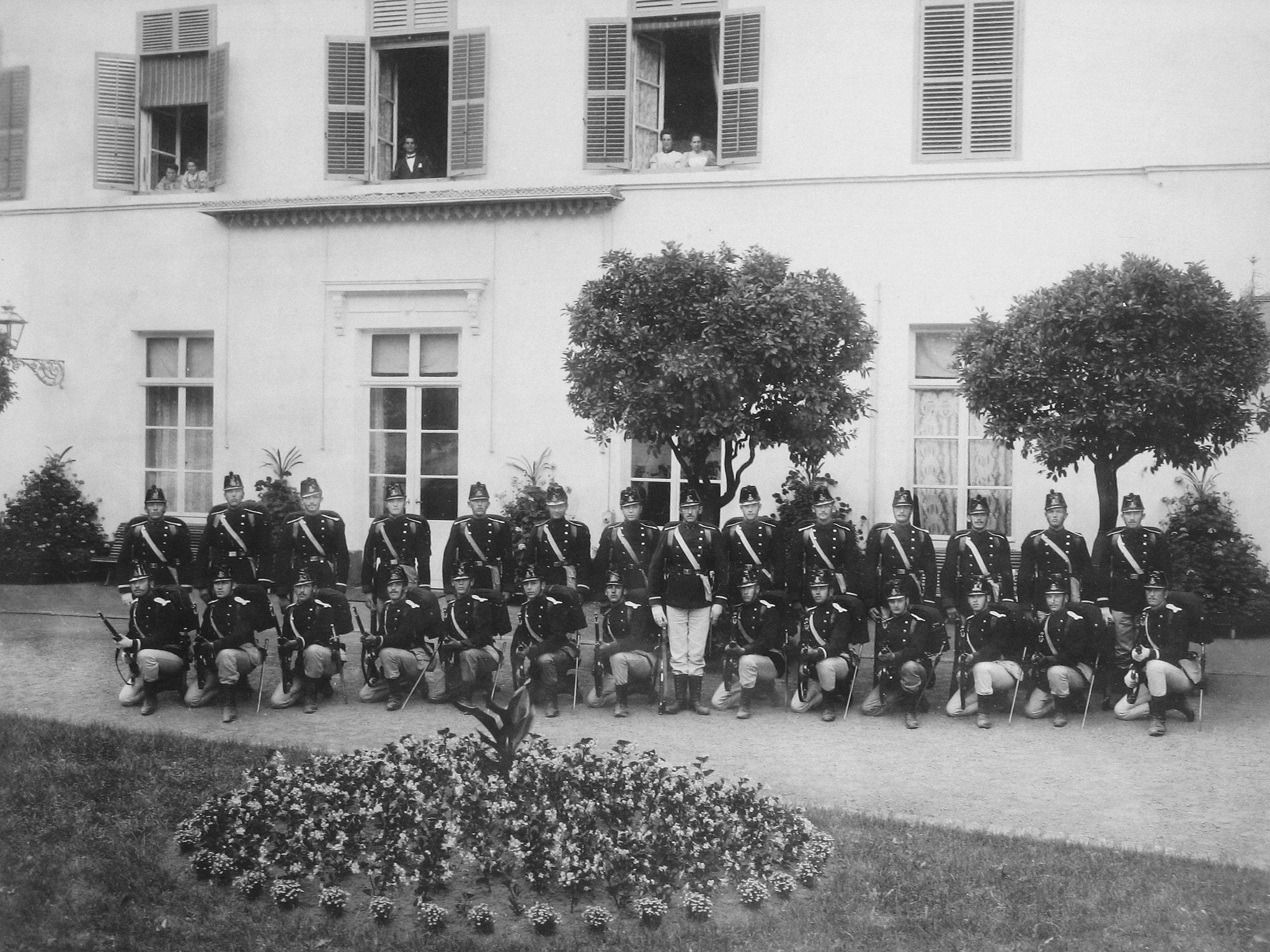
Soldiers of the Corps des Gendarmes et Volontaires pose for a photograph, 1910

On 16 February 1881, the Corps des Gendarmes et Volontaires (Corps of Gendarmes and Volunteers) was established. It was composed of two companies, a company of gendarmes and one of volunteers. In 1939, a corps of auxiliary volunteers was established and attached to the company of volunteers. Following the occupation of Luxembourg by Germany in May 1940, recruitment for the company of volunteers continued until 4 December 1940, when they were moved to Weimar, Germany, to be trained as German police.

In November 1918 Luxembourg faced two small communist rebellions in Luxembourg City and Esch-sur-Alzette. Both were quickly suppressed by police. In December 1918 a group of soldiers attempted a mutiny in the Luxembourg City barracks.

On 9 January 1919, a group of socialist and liberal deputies, tabled a motion to make Luxembourg a republic. A crowd gathered at the barracks of the Corps of Volunteers, close to the Chamber. Then Émile Servais, a left-wing politician, walked out the Chamber, addressed the crowd and demanded a republic. The crowd then rushed the Chamber and the deputies called in the Corps of Volunteers but the soldiers refused the orders to disperse the crowd. Part of the deputies then fled the Chamber. The remaining deputies, mainly left-wing, formed the Committee of Public Safety with Servais as its leader. The committee had no public support and the French Army under the command of General de La Tour soon quelled the turmoil.

=== Luxembourg Battery ===
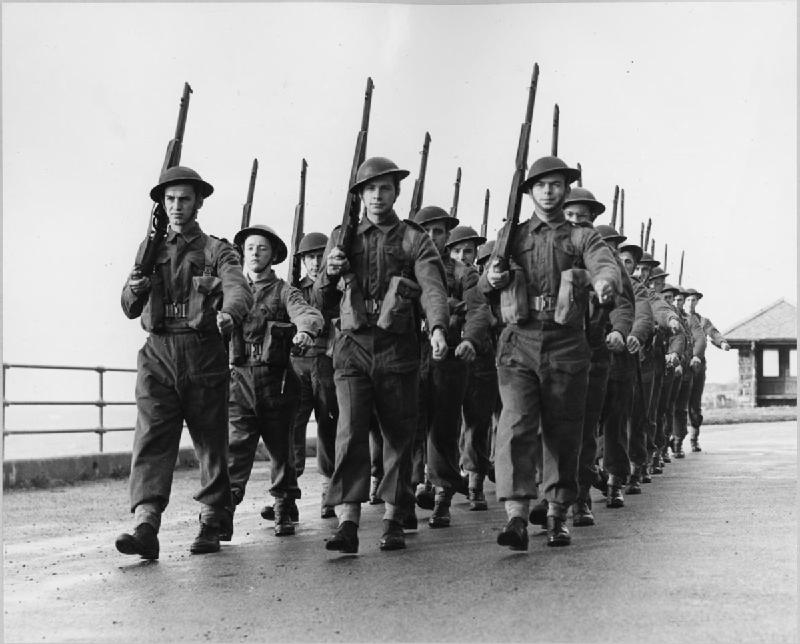
Luxembourg troops training in an English seaside town in 1943

In 1944 during World War II, the Luxembourg Government, while exiled in London, made agreements for a group of seventy Luxembourg volunteers to be assigned to the Artillery Group of the 1st Belgian Infantry Brigade, commonly known as Brigade Piron, Jean-Baptiste Piron being the chief of this unit. This contingent was named the Luxembourg Battery. Initially, it was built up and trained by two Belgian officers. Later, from August 1944, these were joined by Luxembourg officers, who had received training in Britain.

Several Luxembourg NCOs and half of the country's troops had fought in North Africa in the French Foreign Legion. The rest were people who had escaped from Luxembourg, and young men evading forcible conscription into the Wehrmacht by fleeing to Britain. The Luxembourg unit landed in Normandy on 6 August 1944—at approximately the same time as the Dutch Princess Irene Brigade and the French 2nd Armoured Division ("2e Division blindée") commanded by General Leclerc—two months after the D-Day landings.

The Luxembourg Battery was equipped with four Ordnance QF 25 pounder howitzers, which were named after the four daughters of Grand Duchess Charlotte: Princesses Elisabeth, Marie Adelaide, Marie Gabriele and Alix.

=== Post-liberation ===
Following liberation in September 1944, conscription was introduced in Luxembourg for the first time in November 1944. In 1945, the Corps de la Garde Grand Ducale (Grand Ducal Guard Corps) garrisoned in the Saint-Esprit barracks in Luxembourg City and the 1st and 2nd infantry battalions were established, one in Walferdange and the other in Dudelange. The Luxembourg Armed Forces took charge of part of the French occupation zone in Germany, the 2nd Battalion occupying part of the Bitburg district and a detachment from the 1st Battalion part of the Saarburg district. The 2nd Battalion remained in Bitburg until 1955. The strength of the army rose to 2,150 men. Luxembourg signed the Treaty of Brussels in March 1948, and the North Atlantic Treaty in 1949.

Setting up an army after the war proved more difficult than predicted. To a certain extent, the authorities could rely on escaped German conscripts and Luxembourgers who had joined Allied armies; however, they had to find a way to train officers. Initially, British military advisers came to Luxembourg, where training was carried out by British officers and NCOs. But officer training, in the long term, would have to be done in military schools abroad. Belgium and France were both interested in helping and offered solutions. In the end, the government opted for a compromise solution, by sending some officer cadets to the École spéciale militaire de Saint-Cyr in France and others to the Royal Military Academy in Belgium. This eventually led to disunity within the Luxembourg officer corps due to differences in training and promotion.

In 1951, the Grand Ducal Guard relocated to Walferdange and integrated with the Commandement des Troupes. The Guard had special units for reconnaissance, radiac reconnaissance, and anti-air warfare. From 1955, it was organised into a headquarters company, a garrison platoon, a reconnaissance company and two training companies. In 1959, the Commandement des Troupes was disbanded and the Grand Ducal Guard was integrated into the Commandement du Territoire (Territorial Command). The force was reduced to a single company, a corporals' training school, and a weapons platoon. In 1960, the Grand Ducal Guard was again reorganised into four platoons, temporarily grouped into intervention and reinforcement detachments. In 1964, the Grand Ducal Guard was organized into a HQ, three platoons, a reinforcement platoon, and the NCO school. On 28 February 1966, the Grand Ducal Guard was officially disbanded.

=== Korean War ===
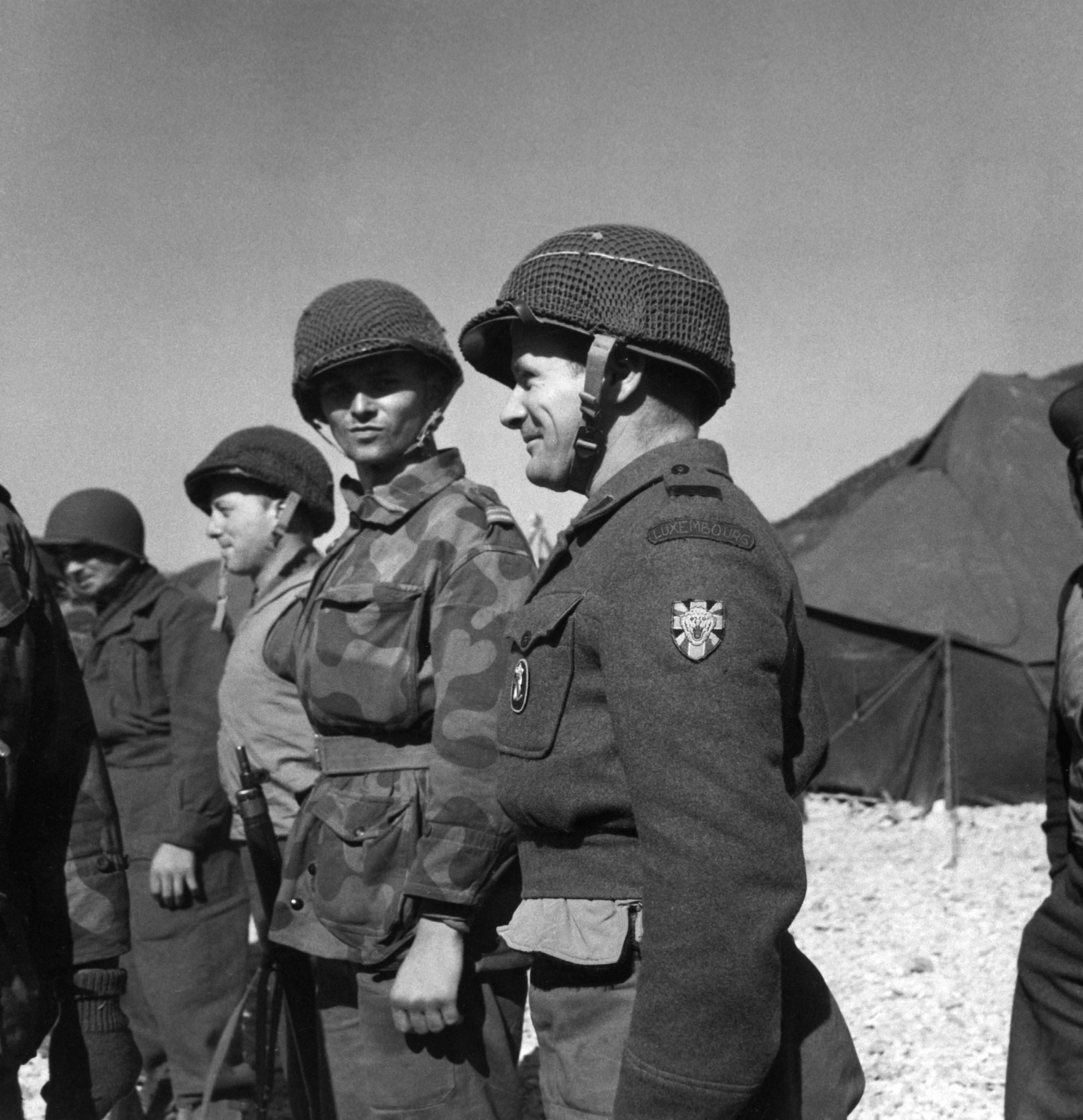
A Luxembourgish soldier in Korea, 1953

In 1950, seventeen countries, including Luxembourg, decided to send armed forces to assist the Republic of Korea. The Luxembourg contingent was incorporated into the Belgian United Nations Command or the Korean Volunteer Corps. The Belgo-Luxembourgish battalion arrived in Korea in 1951, and was attached to the US 3rd Infantry Division. Two Luxembourger soldiers were killed and 17 were wounded in the war. The Belgo-Luxembourg battalion was disbanded in 1955.

=== Groupement Tactique Régimentaire and Home Command ===
In 1954, the Groupement Tactique Régimentaire (GTR) (Regimental Tactical Group) was established as Luxembourg's contribution to NATO. It consisted of three infantry battalions, an artillery battalion, and support, medical, transport, signals, engineering, heavy mortar, reconnaissance, and headquarters companies. By 1954, its overall strength had risen to 5,200 men. The GTR was disbanded in 1959.

In addition to the GTR, the Army also included the Territorial Command, composed of headquarters, military police, movement and transportation companies, a static guard battalion, and a mobile battalion. By 1954, it numbered some 2,500 men. At the same date, some 2.45 percent of the country's population was serving in the military.

=== 1st Artillery Battalion ===
In 1961, the 1st Artillery Battalion was placed at NATO's disposal. The battalion was organised into three batteries, each with six 105 millimetres (4.1 in) field howitzers (British 25 pounder guns converted to 105 mm caliber) from the former GTR artillery battalion, an HQ battery, and a service battery. In 1963, the battalion was attached to the US 8th Infantry Division. In 1966, the Grand Ducal Guard was disbanded and its tasks were transferred to and performed by the 1st Artillery Battalion until it too was disbanded, in 1967.

=== 1st Infantry Battalion ===
Compulsory military service was abolished in 1967 by which time some 34,700 men had served at some point in the Luxembourg Army. As part of a major reorganisation of the military, the 1st Infantry Battalion was established, consisting of a headquarters and services unit, two motorized infantry companies, and a reconnaissance company with two reconnaissance (recce) platoons and an anti-tank platoon. From 1968 onwards, it formed a part of NATO's ACE Mobile Force (Land) (AMF(L)). In 1985, a reinforced company—consisting of an AMF Company with two recce platoons and an anti-tank platoon, a forward air-control team, a national support element for logistics, and a medical support element—replaced the battalion. In 2002 the AMF(L) was dissolved.

=== Recent international operations ===
Luxembourg started financially supporting international peacekeeping missions in 1991, citing the Persian Gulf War, Rwanda and in Albania. Luxembourg has been deploying military personnel for peacekeeping missions since 1992.

Luxembourg has contributed troops to the UNPROFOR from April 1992 to August 1993, deploying in total 40 military personnel in a Belgian battalion. In 1996 Luxembourg contributed to IFOR missions in former Yugoslavia in a multinational transport company. This was followed by a small contingent in the NATO SFOR mission in Bosnia and Herzegovina, completing 9 personnel rotations. The Luxembourg Armed Forces were integrated into the Multinational Beluga Force under Belgian command.

Luxembourg has contributed over 18 years in NATO KFOR, totalling 1200 military personnel. Luxembourg deployed a reconnaissance platoon first from 2000 to 2006 under Belgian command and from 2007 to 2011 under a French detachment. From 2011 to 2017 Luxembourg was subordinated to the headquarters in Pristina, collaborating with an Austrian reconnaissance company.

Together with Belgium, Luxembourg contributed military personnel to UNIFIL in Lebanon from 2006 to 2014.

Over 35 rotations, Luxembourg troops have been deployed to Afghanistan from 2003 to 2014 to support ISAF in Kabul and Kandahar. The army has also participated in humanitarian relief missions such as setting up refugee camps for Kurds and providing emergency supplies to Albania. Furthermore, Luxembourg participated in the RSM in Mazar-i-Sharif from 2015 to 2021 and provided evacuation support during the August 2021 Taliban offensive in Kabul.

The Luxembourg Armed Forces have also been active in Africa, supporting the EU Security Reform Mission in the Democratic Republic of the Congo (EUSEC RDC), the EU Military Operation in Eastern Chad and North Eastern Central African Republic (EUFOR Chad/CAR), following with the MINURCAT. From 2013 to 2022 Luxembourg provided support to EUTM in Mali.

Luxembourg is also active in the NATO eFP, contributing logistical and satellite transmission support in Lithuania since 2017.

== Luxembourg Armed Forces Organization ==
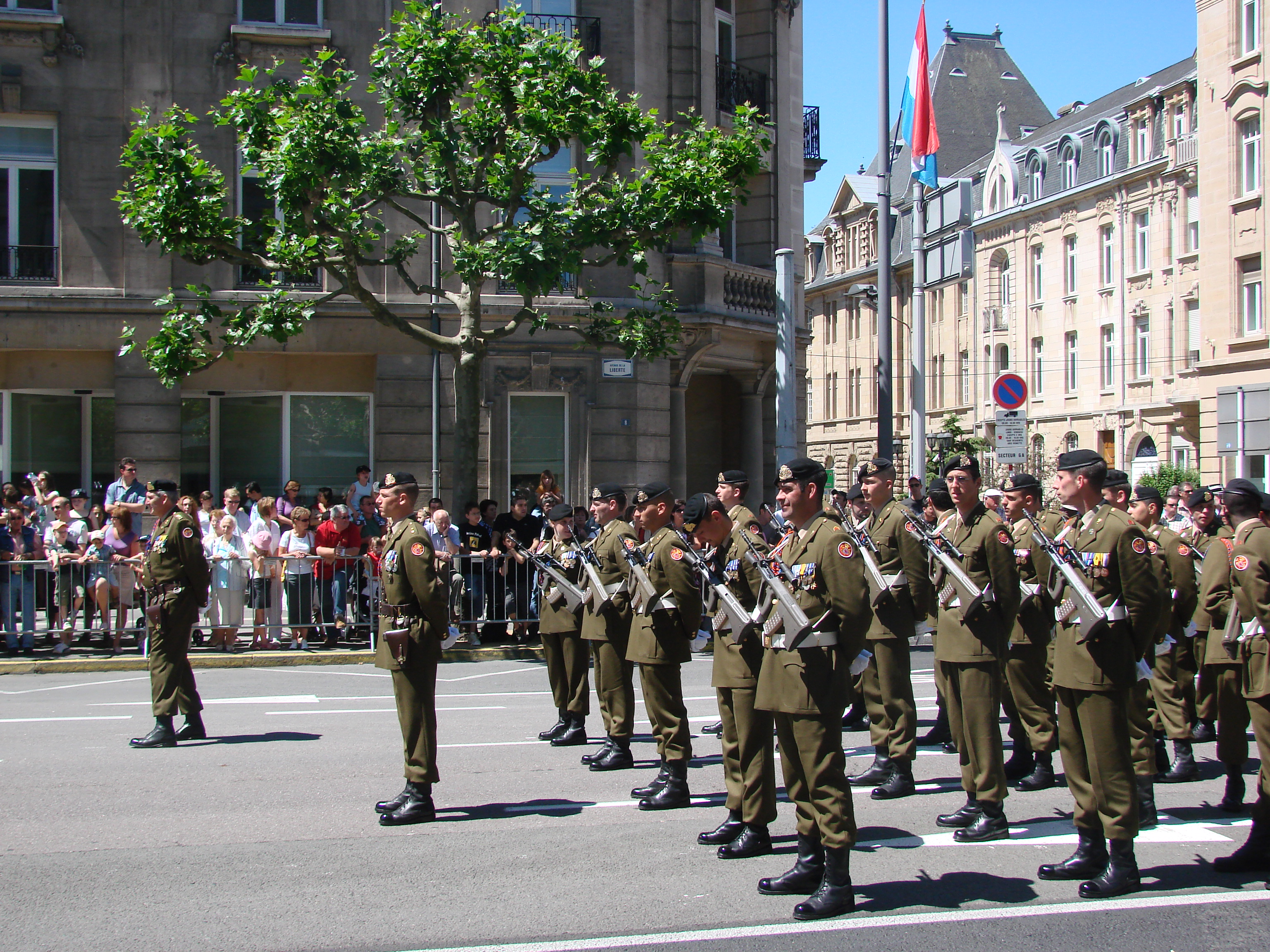
Luxembourg soldiers during National Day

The army is under civilian control, with the Grand Duke as Commander-in-Chief. The Minister for Defence oversees army operations. The professional head of the army is the Chief of Defence, currently Steve Thull, who answers to the minister. The Grand Duke and the Chief of Defence are the only generals, with colonels as Deputy Chief of Defence and head of the Military Training Centre.

Until 1999, the army was integrated into the Force Publique (Public Force), which included the Gendarmerie and the Police, until the Gendarmerie was merged with the Grand Ducal Police under a different minister in 2000. The army has been an all-volunteer force since 1967. It has a strength of around 900 professional soldiers and 200 civilians with a total budget of approximately $389 million, or 0.57% of GDP in 2021.

The Luxembourg Army is a battalion-sized formation with four separate compagnies (companies) under the control of the Centre Militaire (Military Centre), located in the Caserne Grand-Duc Jean barracks on Herrenberg hill near the town of Diekirch. Luxembourg has no navy, as the country is landlocked. It has an air force since 2021 and an aircraft.

=== Compagnie A ===
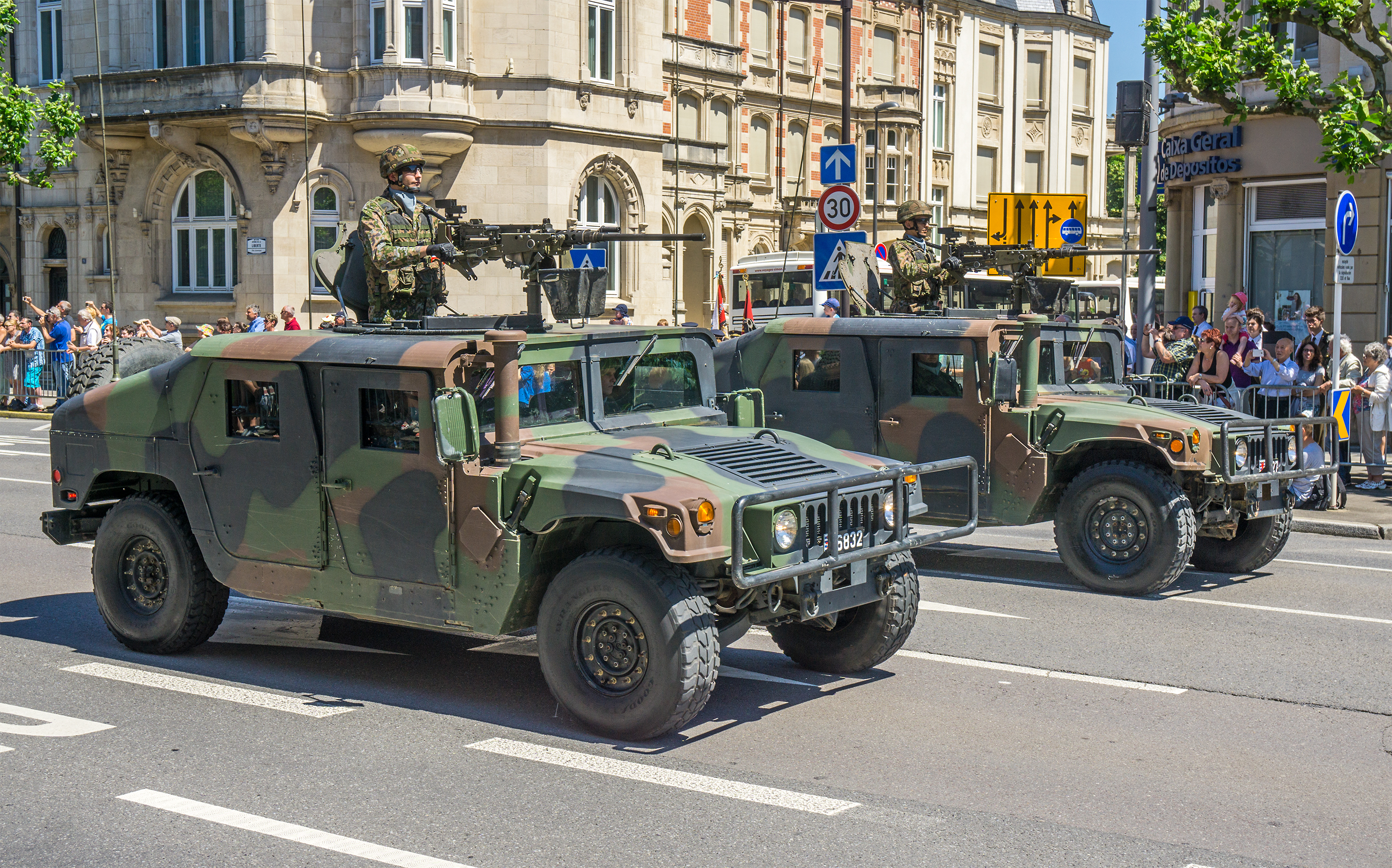
Luxembourg army troops are seen using Humvee as their military vehicle, with .50 BMG Heavy Machine Gun

Compagnie A, the first of two rifle companies that forms the Luxembourg contingent of the Eurocorps, is normally integrated into the Belgian contribution during operations. As such, it participates in Eurocorps' contribution to the NATO Response Force (entire company) and the EU Battlegroups (one platoon). The company consists of a command element and three reconnaissance platoons of four sections each, plus a command section. Each section is equipped with two armoured M1114 HMMWVs, each armed with a .50 caliber M2 Browning machine gun. The command section has a MAN X40 truck in addition to its pair of HMMWVs.

=== Compagnie B ===
Compagnie B, currently known as the Reconversion Service, is the educational unit of the Army, providing various educational courses for personnel to take in preparation for advancement. On 19 May 2011, Company B was redesignated as the Service de Reconversion (Reconversion Service) with the mission to prepare volunteer soldiers for the return to civilian life. The service includes the L'Ecole de l'Armee (Army School). In order to attend this school a soldier must have at least eighteen months of service. The school is divided into two sections:

- Level B - is open to all soldiers at the end of their first eighteen months of service. Soldiers follow two six-month periods of tuition in both general and military-based subjects prior to taking examinations. Upon gaining 75% pass marks, they can proceed to the next level.
- Level A - is open to soldiers who have achieved the required passes at Level B, or who have attained the equivalent in civilian life prior to their enlistment. Soldiers do a single six-month period of tuition in the same subjects as Level B, but for a longer period each week.

=== Compagnie C ===
Compagnie C, better known as the Compagnie Commandement et Instruction (Staff & Instruction Company), is the main military training unit of the Luxembourg Armed Forces, with instruction given in:

- Basic soldiering
- Driving
- Physical training

This company is also responsible for the army's Elite Sports Section, reserved for sportsmen in the Army. Following their basic training, these soldiers join the Section de Sports d'Elite de l'Armée (SSEA).

=== Compagnie D ===
Compagnie D is the second rifle company – it provided Luxembourg's contribution to NATO's ACE Mobile Force (Land) (disbanded in 2002) as the Luxembourg Reconnaissance Company. Luxembourg's participation in various UN, EU, and NATO missions is drawn from Compagnie D, which mirrors Compagnie A in organisation, with a command element and three reconnaissance platoons.

== Aircraft of the Luxembourg Air Wing ==
Luxembourg has a small air wing. All NATO AWACS planes are registered to the LAF and sport the Luxembourg Armed Forces roundel.

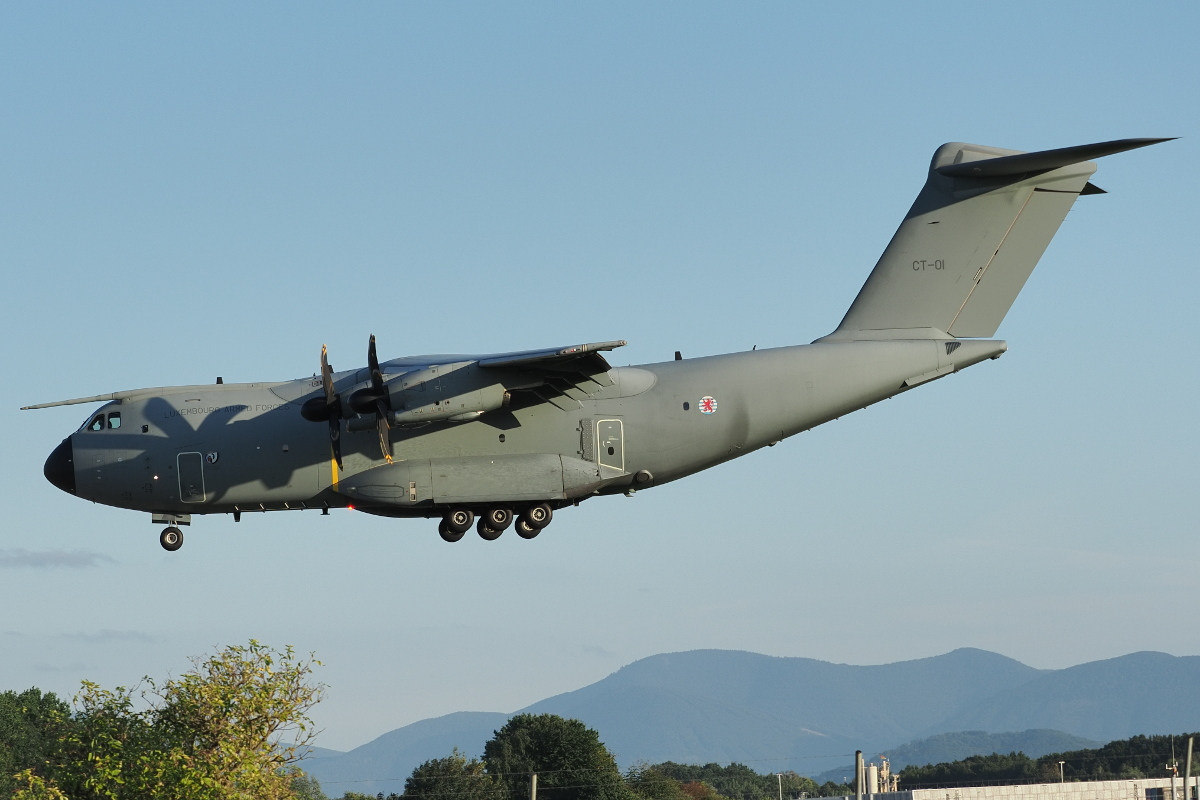
Airbus A400M Atlas CT-01 in service with Luxembourg

=== Luxembourg Air Wing ===
Aircraft	Variant	Origin	Type	In service	Notes
Airbus A400M	—	Belgium France Germany Spain Turkey United Kingdom	Strategic transport / Tactical airlift	1 (Luxembourg); 8 (total bi-national unit)	Bi-national military transport unit, with the first aircraft delivered to Luxembourg in October 2020. 7 A400M and 2 refuelling kits for the A400M are operated by the Belgian 15th Air Transport Wing. The bi-national (Belgium and Luxembourg) unit operates 8 A400Ms in total. The final aircraft was delivered in 2024.
Airbus H145	H145M	Germany	Light utility helicopter	1	2 H145M received in January 2020, 1 for the Police, and 1 for the Luxembourg Air Wing.

=== Co-owned aircraft ===
Model	Variant	Operators	Image	Origin	Type	Quantity	Notes
Tanker / Transport
Airbus A330 MRTT Multi-Role Tanker Transport	A330-200 MRTT	MMF Multinational MRTT Fleet: Belgium; Czech Republic; Denmark; Germany; Luxembourg; Netherlands; Norway; Sweden		France Germany Spain United Kingdom	Tanker / Transport aircraft	9 (+3 on order)	Based at the Eindhoven Air Base in the Netherlands.: 2 ordered in July 2016 (first members Netherlands and Luxembourg); 5 ordered in September 2018 (Germany and Norway joined the programme); 1 ordered in February 2018 (Belgium joined the programme); 1 ordered in September 2020 (Luxembourg increases participation); 1 ordered in March 2023 (Belgium increases participation); 2 ordered in June 2025 (arrival of Sweden and Denmark in the programme); The first aircraft entered service in June 2020, the ninth in February 2025.
Air surveillance
Boeing E-3 Sentry	E-3A	NAEW&CF programme NATO Airborne Early Warning & Control Force: Belgium; Canada; Czech Republic; Denmark; Germany; Greece; Hungary; Italy; Luxembourg; Netherlands; Norway; Poland; Portugal; Romania; Turkey; Spain; United States		United States	AEW&C Airborne early warning and control	14	Based at NATO Air Base Geilenkirchen, Germany. 18 E-3 used initially, and to be replaced by the E-7 Wedgetail, of which 6 ordered in January 2024.
Boeing E-7 Wedgetail	E-7A	NAEW&CF programme NATO Airborne Early Warning & Control Force: Belgium; Canada; Czech Republic; Denmark; Germany; Greece; Hungary; Italy; Luxembourg; Netherlands; Norway; Poland; Portugal; Romania; Turkey; Spain; United States		United States	AEW&C Airborne early warning and control	0 (+6 on order)	Based at NATO Air Base Geilenkirchen, Germany. 18 E-3 used initially, and to be replaced by the E-7 Wedgetail, of which 6 ordered in January 2024.
UAV
RQ-4 Global Hawk	RQ-4D Phoenix (Block 40)	AGS Alliance Ground Surveillance: Bulgaria; Czechia; Denmark; Estonia; Germany; Italy; Latvia; Lithuania; Luxembourg; Norway; Poland; Romania; Slovakia; Slovenia; United Kingdom; United States		United States	UAV HALE, ISR, Combat Unmanned aerial vehicle high altitude long endurance, intelligence surveillance reconnaissance	5	

=== Retired aircraft ===
Previous aircraft operated were 3 Piper PA-18 Super Cubs from 1952 to 1968.

== Uniform ==
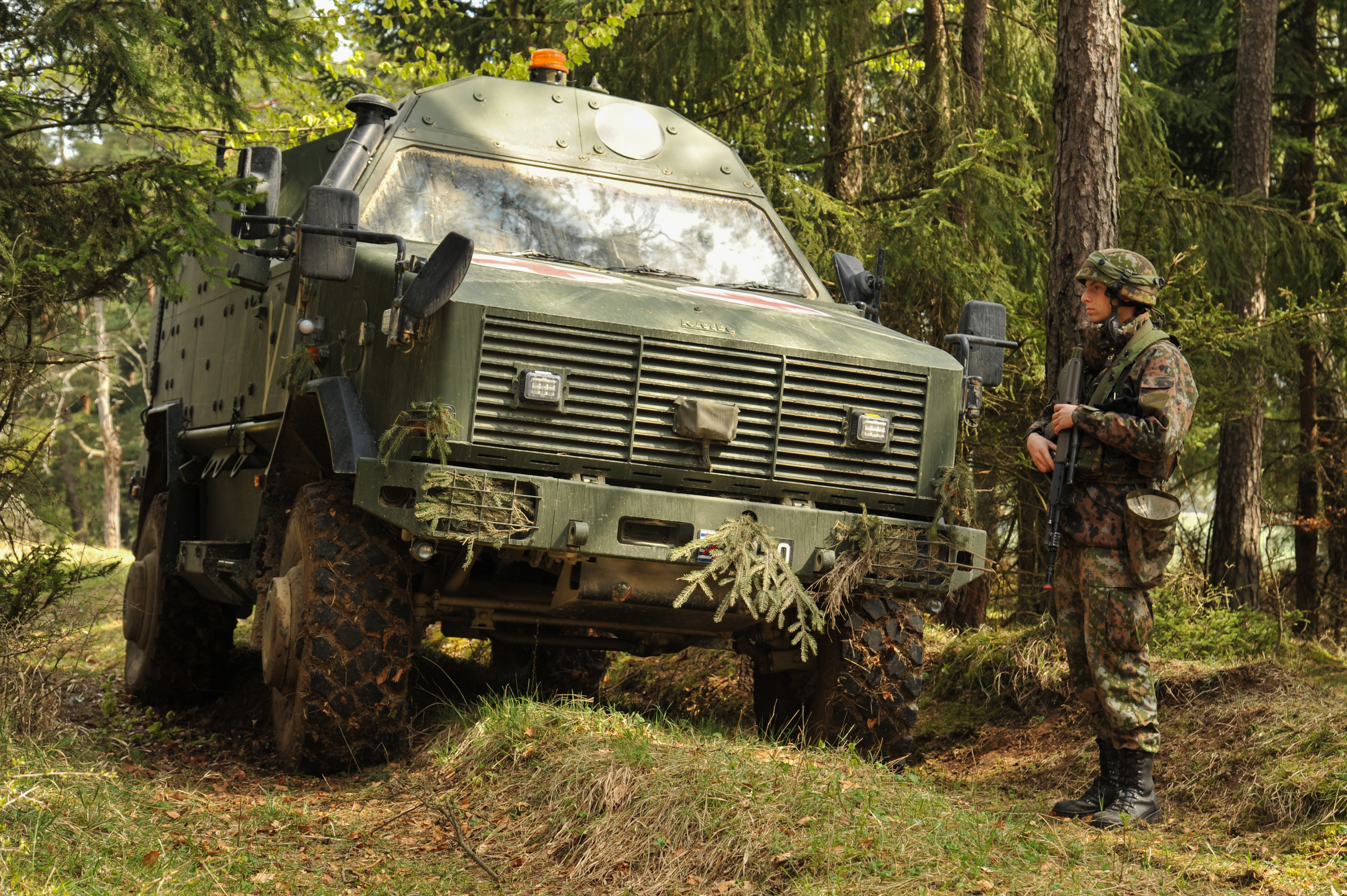
Soldier in front of a Dingo ambulance vehicle in 2015

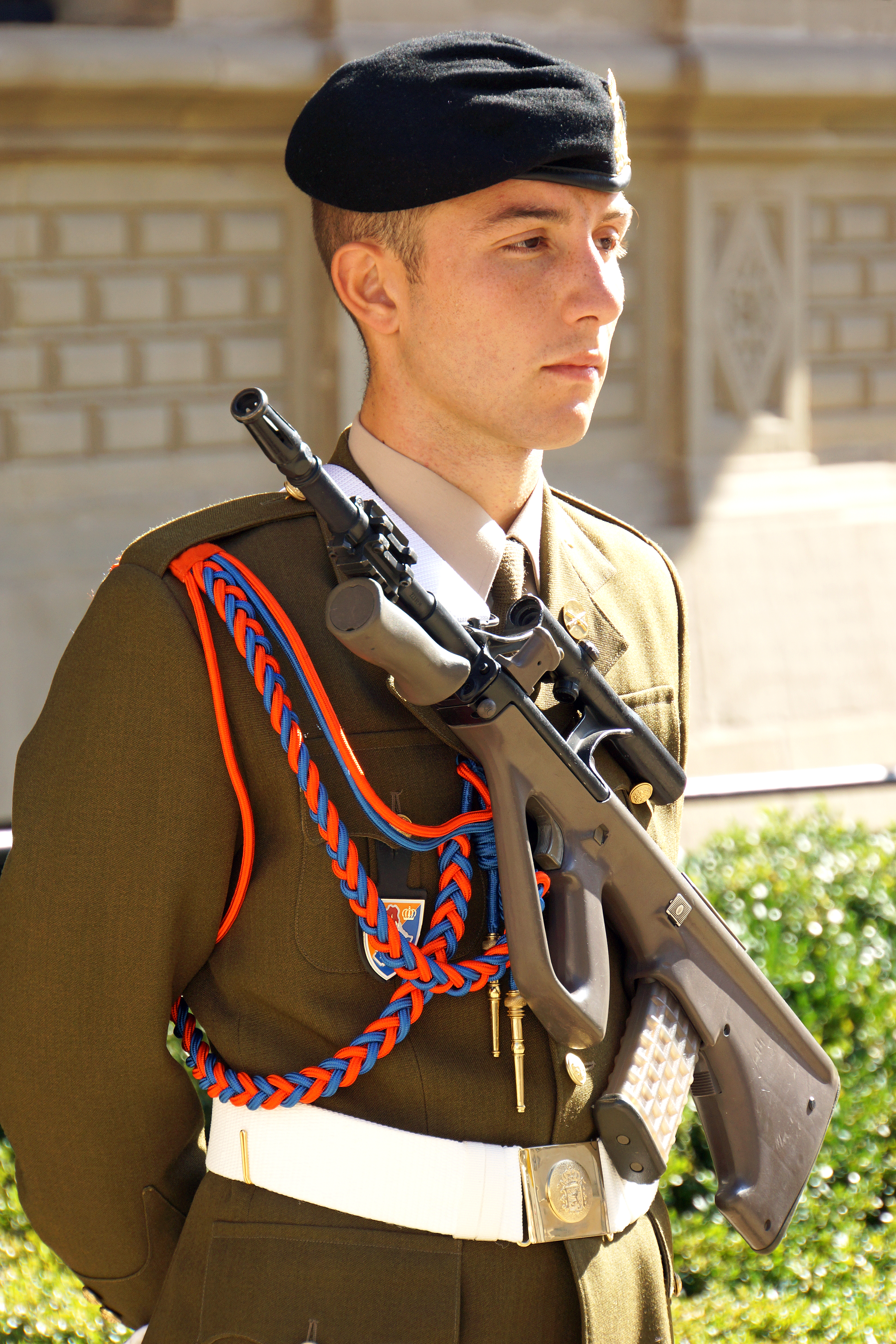
A guard in front of the Grand Ducal Palace seen carrying AUG A1

Luxembourg military uniforms consist of dress, service (or garrison) and field uniforms, often worn with a black beret. Dress uniforms are worn mostly on formal occasions, while service uniforms are worn for daily duty. Luxembourg Armed Forces uniforms consist of service and field attire for summer and winter, as well as a dress uniform and mess jacket for officers. The winter service dress uniform, of olive drab wool, consists of a single-breasted coat having patch pockets with flaps, a khaki shirt and tie, and trousers that are usually cuffless. The summer uniform is similar, but made of light tan material.

Combat uniforms use either a temperate or desert camouflage pattern resembling the Finnish M05 pattern. These patterns were adopted in 2010–11 to replace the U.S. Woodland pattern used since 1985.

== Grades ==
=== Officers ===
Those who have completed high school will enter a special thirteen-week basic training in the Army as warrant officers, then attend the military officer school for five years (normally in Brussels, Belgium), before becoming a lieutenant in the Luxembourg Armed Forces.

Aspiring officers are sent to the Belgian École Royale Militaire in Brussels, or the Ecole Spéciale Militaire de Saint-Cyr in France. After the first two years at these schools, officer-cadets receive the title of lieutenant.

After leaving the military academy, officer candidates become probationary officers for a period of twenty-four months. The probation period consists of specialised military-branch training at a school abroad, and practical service within one of the Army's units. If they succeed during this probation, their appointment as lieutenants is made permanent.

=== NCOs ===
Those who have completed five years of high school and have served four months as voluntary soldiers, will do a nine-month stage at the Infantry Training Department of the Belgian Army in Arlon, before becoming sergeants in the Luxembourg Armed Forces.

=== Career Corporals ===
Those who have not completed five years of high school may, after three years of service, become career corporals in the Luxembourg Armed Forces, if they pass physical and mental tests. They also have to pass a part of the NCO School in Belgium.

== Insignia ==
=== Officers ===
NATO code	OF-10	OF-9	OF-8	OF-7	OF-6	OF-5	OF-4	OF-3	OF-2	OF-1
Luxembourg Army
Luxembourg Army					Général	Colonel	Lieutenant-colonel	Major	Capitaine	Lieutenant en premier	Lieutenant

=== NCOs and enlisted ===
NATO code	OR-9		OR-8	OR-7	OR-6	OR-5	OR-4		OR-3		OR-2		OR-1
Luxembourg Army
Luxembourg Army	Adjudant-major	Adjudant-chef	Adjudant	Sergent-chef	Premier sergent	Sergent	Premier caporal-chef	Caporal-chef	Caporal de première classe	Caporal	Premier soldat-chef	Soldat-chef	Soldat de première classe	Soldat

== Military industry ==
Luxembourg has a law permitting companies to only produce such material for the armed forces (domestic or foreign) that is not a lethal weapon. As lethal weapon production is banned, Luxembourg Armed Forces sources its weapons from abroad. Luxembourg does however have some production of military and dual-use equipment that are not lethal weapons; about 75 firms in Luxembourg produce (directly or indirectly) material that armed forces use. Such equipment is for example armored rescue vehicles (inter alia ambulances) and drones. Luxembourg has been growing its defense industry after Russian attack on Ukraine and discussion about modifying the lethal weapons ban have taken place.

== Space ==
Luxembourg has a satellite in orbit, the GovSat-1, which is used in military communications. Luxembourg has 4 dedicated government/military satellite communications ground stations. Luxembourg's satellite communications work in co-operation with NATO allies.
