= Canoeing at the 1952 Summer Olympics – Men's K-1 10000 metres =

These are the results of the men's K-1 10000 metres competition in canoeing at the 1952 Summer Olympics. The K-1 event is raced by single-man canoe sprint kayaks.

== Medalists ==
Gold	Silver	Bronze
Thorvald Strömberg (FIN)	Gert Fredriksson (SWE)	Michael Scheuer (GER)

== Final ==
The final took place on July 27.

Gold	Thorvald Strömberg (FIN)	47:22.8
Silver	Gert Fredriksson (SWE)	47:34.1
Bronze	Michael Scheuer (GER)	47:54.5
4.	Ejvind Hansen (DEN)	47:58.8
5.	Hans Martin Gulbrandsen (NOR)	48:12.9
6.	Miloš Pech (TCH)	48:25.8
7.	Ivan Sotnikov (URS)	48:36.8
8.	Jochem Bobeldijk (NED)	49:36.2
9.	Alfred Schmidtberger (AUT)	49:45.6
10.	Pierre Derivery (FRA)	49:48.5
11.	Hilaire Deprez (BEL)	50:20.6
12.	Geoffrey Colyer (GBR)	50:55.3
13.	Josip Lipokatič (YUG)	51:01.3
14.	William Schuette (USA)	52:44.6
15.	Aldo Albera (ITA)	53:49.2
16.	Raymond Kamber (SUI)	54:57.3
17.	Léon Roth (LUX)	56:02.9
