= Léon Roth (canoeist) =

Luxembourgish canoeist (born 1926)

Léon Roth (born 10 September 1926) is a Luxembourgish sprint canoer who competed in the early 1950s. He was born in Diekirch. At the 1952 Summer Olympics in Helsinki, he finished 17th in the K-1 10000 m event. He was eliminated in the heats of the K-2 1000 m event. In 2008 he was promoted to the rank of Chevalier in the Order of Merit of the Grand Duchy of Luxembourg.
