= Ivan Sotnikov =

Soviet sprint canoeist

Ivan Sotnikov (15 August 1913 in Oleshky – January 2004) was a Soviet sprint canoeist who competed in the early 1950s. He finished seventh in the K-1 10000 m event at the 1952 Summer Olympics in Helsinki.
