= George Ward =

George Ward may refer to:

== Sportspeople ==
- G. B. Ward (1878–1942), American college football player and coach
- George Ward (canoeist) (1932–2008), Canadian Olympic canoer
- George Ward (footballer, born 1877) (1877–1921), Australian rules football player for Essendon
- George Ward (footballer, born 1889) (1889–1928), Australian rules football player for Richmond
- George Ward (footballer, born 1908) (1908–1981), English footballer
- George Ward (rugby union) (1885–1962), English rugby union player
- George Ward (rugby league) (1910–1991), Australian rugby league player
- George S. Ward (1867–1940), vice president of the Brooklyn Federal League Baseball Club

== Politicians ==
- George Ward, 1st Viscount Ward of Witley (1907–1988), British Conservative Party politician
- George Ward (Liberal politician) (1878–1951), member of parliament for Bosworth
- George B. Ward (1867–1940), mayor of Birmingham, Alabama
- George Taliaferro Ward (1810–1862), cotton plantation owner and politician from Leon County, Florida
- George F. Ward (born 1945), former United States ambassador to Namibia

== Others ==
- Cherry Valentine (1993–2022), English drag queen
- George Ward (luthier) (died c. 1769), Irish luthier
- George Ward (priest) (1862–1946), Archdeacon of Wisbech
- George Hull Ward (1826–1863), soldier and Union officer in the American Civil War
- George W. Ward (1867–1932), principal of Maryland State Normal School (now Towson University)
- George Ward (1933–2012), co-owner of Grunwick Film Processing Laboratories during the 1976–78 Grunwick dispute
- George Ward (died 1901), lynched by a white mob in Terre Haute, Indiana

== See also ==
- George Warde (1725–1803), British Army officer
