= Annalisa (given name) =

Annalisa is an Italian feminine given name. Notable people named Annalisa include:

- Annalisa Bona (born 1982), Italian tennis player
- Annalisa Bucci (born 1983), Italian kickboxer
- Annalisa Buffa (born 1973), Italian mathematician
- Annalisa Ceresa (born 1978), Italian alpine skier
- Annalisa Cochrane (born 1996), American actress
- Annalisa Coltorti (born 1963), Italian épée fencer
- Annalisa Crannell, American mathematician
- Annalisa Cucinotta (born 1986), Italian track cyclist
- Annalisa Drew (born 1993), American freestyle skier
- Annalisa Durante (1990–2004), 14-year-old girl shot by the Camorra
- Annalisa Ericson (1913–2011), Swedish actress
- Annalisa Insardà (born 1978), Italian actress
- Annalisa Malara (born 1982), Italian intensive care physician
- Annalisa Marzano (born 1969), Italian-American archaeologist and academic
- Annalisa Minetti (born 1976), Italian blind singer and Paralympian
- Annalisa Nisiro (born 1973), Italian swimmer
- Annalisa Piras, Italian journalist and film director
- Annalisa Scarrone (born 1985), Italian singer-songwriter
- Annalisa Turci (born 1976), Italian softball player

== See also ==
- Annalise
