= Canoeing at the 1952 Summer Olympics – Men's K-2 10000 metres =

These are the results of the men's K-2 10000 metres competition in canoeing at the 1952 Summer Olympics. The K-2 event is raced by two-man canoe sprint kayaks.

== Medalists ==
| Gold | Silver | Bronze |
| Kurt Wires and Yrjö Hietanen (FIN) | Gunnar Åkerlund and Hans Wetterström (SWE) | Ferenc Varga and József Gurovits (HUN) |

== Final ==
The final took place July 27.

| Gold | Kurt Wires and Yrjö Hietanen (FIN) | 44:21.3 |
| Silver | Gunnar Åkerlund and Hans Wetterström (SWE) | 44:21.7 |
| Bronze | Ferenc Varga and József Gurovits (HUN) | 44:26.6 |
| 4. | Max Raub and Herbert Wiedermann (AUT) | 44:29.1 |
| 5. | Ivar Mathisen and Knut Østby (NOR) | 45:04.7 |
| 6. | Karl-Heinz Schäfer and Meinrad Miltenberger (GER) | 45:15.2 |
| 7. | Rudolf Klabouch and Bedřich Dvořák (TCH) | 45:39.6 |
| 8. | Ingvard Nørregaard and Svend Frømming (DEN) | 45:59.6 |
| 9. | Cees Koch and Jan Klingers (NED) | 46:09.6 |
| 10. | Igor Feoktistov and Nikolay Teterkin (URS) | 47:00.9 |
| 11. | William Brigden and James Nickel (CAN) | 47:53.2 |
| 12. | Heinrich Hess and Kurt Zimmer (SAA) | 48:05.6 |
| 13. | Josy Koelsch and Georges Kunz (FRA) | 48:23.2 |
| 14. | John Anderson and Paul Bochenwich (USA) | 48:30.7 |
| 15. | Graham Palmer and Raymond Parker (GBR) | 48:32.6 |
| 16. | Werner Müller and Werner Bieri (SUI) | 49:21.2 |
| 17. | Raffaele Bastoni and Dante Agostini (ITA) | 49:21.8 |
| 18. | Eugène Hanck and Roland Licker (LUX) | 50:08.4 |
