= Duranti =

Duranti is an Italian surname derived from the given name Durante. Notable people with the surname include:

- Agnese Duranti (born 2000), Italian group rhythmic gymnast
- Alessandro Duranti (born 1950), Italian anthropologist and academic
- Daniel Duranti (1633–1712/1713), Italian Roman Catholic prelate
- Doris Duranti (1917–1995), Italian film actress
- Durante Duranti (1507–1557), Italian Roman Catholic cardinal
- Faustino Duranti (1695–1766), Italian painter
- Fortunato Duranti (1787–1863), Italian painter and collector
- Francesca Duranti (1935–2025), Italian writer
- Giorgio Duranti (1683–1768), Italian painter and cleric
- Guillaume de Duranti-Concressault (1791–1856), French politician
- Jalel Duranti (born 1994), Italian road cyclist
- Jean-Étienne Duranti (1534–1589), French magistrate
- Lamberto Duranti (1890–1915), Italian patriot and journalist
- Luciana Duranti (born 1950), archival theorist and professor at the University of British Columbia

== See also ==
- Durante
- Durant (disambiguation)
- Aromobates duranti, a species of frog
- Hyalinobatrachium duranti, a species of frog
