= Josy =

Given name

Josy is a given name. Notable people with the name include:

- Josy Ajiboye, Nigerian artist and cartoonist who worked at the Daily Times
- Josy Barthel (1927–1992), Luxembourgish athlete
- Josy Braun (1938–2012), Luxembourg writer, journalist and translator who wrote mainly in Luxembourgish
- Josy Doyon (1932–2011), Swiss farmer and writer
- Josy Dubié, Belgian reporter, politician and a member of Ecolo
- Josy Eisenberg (1933–2017), French television producer and rabbi
- Josy Gyr-Steiner (1949–2007), Swiss politician from the Canton of Schwyz, member of the Swiss National Council
- Josy Joseph, Indian investigative journalist and author
- Josy Koelsch (1926–1985), French sprint canoeist who competed in the early 1950s
- Josy Moinet (1929–2018), French politician who served as a Senator for Charente-Maritime
- Josy Poueyto, French politician representing the Democratic Movement
- Josy Staudt (1904–1937), Luxembourgish gymnast
- Josy Stoffel (1928–2021), Luxembourgish gymnast

== See also ==
- Lycée Technique Josy Barthel (English: Josy Barthel High School), a high school in Mamer, in south-western Luxembourg
- Stade Josy Barthel, the former national stadium of Luxembourg and the former home of the Luxembourg national football team
