= Dontay =

Dontay is an English-language masculine given name, an altered form of Dante or Donte, meaning "lasting" or "enduring". It is often found among African Americans. Notable people with the given name include:

- Dontay Demus Jr. (born 2000), American football wide receiver
- Dontay Moch (born 1988), American former football linebacker

== See also ==
- Dontae
- Deontay
