= Durante =

Durante is both an Italian masculine given name and a surname. Notable people with the name include:

== Given name ==
- Durante Alberti (1538–1613), Italian painter
- Durante degli Alighieri (1265–1321), known as Dante Alighieri, Italian poet
- Durante Duranti (1507–1557), Italian Roman Catholic cardinal
- Durante Nobili (1518–c. 1553), Italian painter

== Surname ==
- Adriano Durante (1940–2009), Italian road bicycle racer
- Alessia Durante (born 1999), Italian weightlifter
- Andrew Durante (born 1982), Australian football (soccer) player
- Anita Durante (1897–1994), Italian actress
- Annalisa Durante (1990–2004), Italian murder victim
- Anthony Durante (1967–2003), American professional wrestler
- Caitlin Durante (born 1986), American writer, comedian and podcaster
- Carlo Durante (1946–2020), Italian paralympic athlete
- Castore Durante (1529–1590), Italian physician, botanist and poet
- Charlotte Durante (born 1944), American businesswoman and community activist
- Checco Durante (1893–1976), Italian film actor
- Daniel Castillo Durante, Argentine-Canadian author and academic
- Danna Durante (born 1973), American gymnastics coach
- David Durante (born 1980), American artistic gymnast
- Eli Durante, Brazilian football (soccer) player
- Fortunato Durante (1655–1714), Italian Roman Catholic prelate
- Francesca Durante (born 1997), Italian football (soccer) player
- Francesco Durante (1684–1755), Neapolitan composer
- Francesco Durante (surgeon) (1844–1934), Italian politician and surgeon
- Hanka Durante (born 1976), German volleyball player
- Jimmy Durante (1893–1980), Italian-American entertainer
- Kristina Durante (born 1973), American evolutionary psychologist, writer and academic
- Marco Durante, multiple people
- Margaret Durante (born 1988), American country music singer
- Mark Durante, American pedal steel guitarist
- Nicandro Durante (born 1956), Brazilian businessman
- Richard Durante (1930–2003), Canadian politician
- Sebastiano Deli di Castel Durante (16th century), Italian Roman Catholic prelate
- Silvestro Durante (died 1672), Italian church musician and composer
- Stefano Gallini-Durante, Italian-American film producer
- Viviana Durante (born 1967), Italian-born English prima ballerina

== See also ==
- Carolina Durante, Spanish indie rock band
- Durante (grape), another name for the Italian wine grape Coda di Volpe
- Durant (disambiguation)
- Dante (disambiguation), originally a contracted version of Durante
- Duranti
