= Dante (name) =

Italian given name and surname

Dante is an Italian given name and surname. Etymologically, it is short for an old given name, Durante, and was first made popular by the Italian poet Dante Alighieri, whose real name was Durante.

Notable people with the name include:

== Given name ==
=== Arts and entertainment ===
- Dante Agostini (1920–1980), Italian-born French drummer and pedagogue
- Dante Alighieri, 14th-century Tuscan author of The Divine Comedy
- Dante Basco (born 1975), Filipino-American actor
- Dante Daniel Bonaduce (born 1959), American actor, comedian, radio personality, television personality, and professional wrestler, known professionally as Danny Bonaduce
- Dante Bowe (born 1993), American Christian musician
- Dante Cappelli (1866–1948), Italian actor
- Dante Carver (born 1977), American actor
- Dante David (1955–2008), Filipino radio disc jockey known as "Howlin' Dave"
- Dante DeCaro (born 1981), Canadian guitarist/songwriter
- Dante Ferretti (born 1943), Italian art director
- Dante Leonelli (born 1931), American sculptor
- Dante da Maiano, 13th-century Italian poet
- Dante Maggio (1909–1992), Italian film actor
- Dante Marioni (born 1964), American glass artist
- Dante Micheaux (living), American poet
- Dante Pereira-Olson (born 2008), American actor
- Dante Quinterno (1909–2003), Argentine comics artist
- Dante Gabriel Rossetti (1828–1882), English painter
- Dante Smith, birth name of Yasiin Bey (born 1973) (formerly known as Mos Def)
- Dante Spinetta (born 1976), Argentine singer/composer
- Dante Spinotti (born 1943), Italian cinematographer
- Dante Testa (1861–1923), Italian actor and director
- Dante Tomaselli (born 1969), American screenwriter and director

=== Politics and law ===
- Dante Arthurs (born 1984), Australian child murderer
- Dante Caputo (1943–2018), Argentine politician
- Dante Carnesecchi (1892–1921), Italian anarchist
- Dante Fascell (1917–1998), American politician
- Dante "Tex" Gill (1930−2003), American gangster and massage parlor owner
- Dante Tiñga (born 1939), Filipino politician and jurist
- Dante Troisi (1920–1989), Italian writer and magistrate

=== Sports ===
- Dante Agostini (canoeist) (born 1923), Italian sprint canoeist
- Dante Amaral (born 1980), Brazilian volleyball player
- Dante Benedetti (1919–2005), American baseball coach and restaurateur
- Dante Bichette (born 1963), American Major League Baseball player
- Dante Bichette Jr. (born 1992), American baseball player
- Dante Bonfim Costa Santos (born 1983), Brazilian footballer
- Dante Boninfante (born 1977), Italian volleyball player
- Dante Booker (born 1977), American football player
- Dante Brown (born 1980), American football player
- Dante Calabria (born 1973), American basketball player
- Dante Campbell (born 1999), Canadian soccer player
- Dante Cunningham (born 1987), American basketball player
- Dante Dowdell (born 2005), American football player
- Dante Exum (born 1995), Australian basketball player
- Dante Fowler (born 1994), American football player
- Dante Hall (born 1978), American football player
- Dante Harris (born 2000), American basketball player
- Dante Hughes (born 1985), American football player
- Dante Lavelli (1923–2009), American football player
- Dante López (born 1983), Paraguayan football player
- Dante Love (born 1986), American college football player
- Dante Magnani (1917–1985), American football player
- Dante Marini (born 1992), American soccer player
- Dante Marsh (born 1981), Canadian football player
- Dante Micheli (1939–2012), Italian football player
- Dante Miller (born 1999), American football player
- Dante Mircoli (born 1947), Argentine footballer
- Dante Moore (born 2005), American football player
- Dante Nori (born 2004), Canadian-born American baseball player
- Dante Olson (born 1997), American football player
- Dante Anthony Pastorini (born 1949), American football quarterback known as Dan Pastorini
- Dante Pettis (born 1995), American football player
- Dante Ridgeway (born 1984), American arena football player
- Dante Rivera (born 1974), American mixed martial arts fighter
- Dante Rosario (born 1984), American football player
- Dante Rossi (1936–2013), Italian water polo player
- Dante Scarnecchia (born 1948), American offensive line coach, assistant head coach for the New England Patriots
- Dante Senger (born 1983), Argentine footballer
- Dante Stills (born 1999), American football player
- Dante Washington (born 1970), American soccer player
- Dante Wesley (born 1979), American football player

=== Other ===
- Dante Giacosa (1905–1996), Italian car designer
- Dante Lauretta (born 1970), American chemist

== Surname ==
- Joe Dante (born 1946), American director
- Michael Dante (born 1931), American actor, stage and screen director and former professional athlete
- N'Faly Dante (born 2001), Malian basketball player
- Peter Dante (born 1968), American actor

== Fictional characters ==
- Dante (Devil May Cry), the protagonist of the video game series Devil May Cry
- Dante (Fullmetal Alchemist), a villainess in the anime Fullmetal Alchemist
- Dante (The Walking Dead), from The Walking Dead comic book series and the television series of the same name
- Dante, one of the Titans in the Legends of Dune series of novels
- Dante, in the American television series One Tree Hill
- Dante, the leader of the Mountain Men in The 100 TV series
- Dante, a playable character in the video game Fire Emblem: Fortune's Weave
- Dante, in the James Joyce novel A Portrait of the Artist as a Young Man
- Dante, in the comic strip Sheldon
- Dante, the main character of Demon Lord Dante
- Dante, a Mexican hairless dog from the 2017 Pixar movie Coco
- Dante Adams, in the 2010 video game Medal of Honor
- Dante Alighieri, the main character in Tage Danielsson's book and film The Man Who Quit Smoking
- Dante Dalmatian, a puppy on 101 Dalmatian Street
- Dante Damiano, on the soap opera The Bold and the Beautiful
- Dante Falconeri, on the soap opera General Hospital
- Dante Fiero (Dennis Feinstein), a businessman in the American sitcom Parks and Recreation
- Dante Hicks, a character from the View Askewniverse and the protagonist of Clerks, Clerks II, Clerks III, and Clerks: The Animated Series
- Dante Koryu, main protagonist in the anime Beyblade Burst Rise
- Inferno (Dante Pertuz), a Marvel Comics superhero
- Dante Quintana, from the novel Aristotle and Dante Discover the Secrets of the Universe by Benjamin Alire Sáenz
- Dante Vale, a major character from Huntik: Secrets & Seekers series
- Dante Zogratis, villain in the anime Black Clover
- Baron Dante, the villain of video games Croc: Legend of the Gobbos and Croc 2
- Jack Dante, the evil genius inventor in the film Death Machine
- Kerberos Dante, a Saint Seiya character
- Silvio Dante, on the HBO TV series The Sopranos
- Dante, the protagonist of the video game Limbus Company
- Dante, a playable frame from the video game Warframe
- Lord-Commander Dante, a Space Marine leader in the tabletop game Warhammer 40,000
- Dante, a dateable object in the video game Date Everything!

== See also ==
- Daunte, given name
- Donta, given name and surname
- Dontae, given name
- Donte, given name
- Edmond Dantès, the lead character in the classic Alexandre Dumas novel The Count of Monte Cristo
