= William Brigden =

Canadian canoeist

William Brigden (April 11, 1916 – January 16, 2005) was a Canadian sprint canoer who competed in the 1940s and early 1950s. He finished 11th in the K-2 10000 m event at the 1952 Summer Olympics in Helsinki.

In addition to his Olympic performance and other successes in sprint racing, Brigden was a successful marathon racer and an avid canoe tripper. He was well known as a designer and builder of canoes, kayaks, and paddles. He hand-made over 1,000 canoes during his lifetime, pioneering the use of fibreglass for this purpose and continuing this vocation into his 80s.

Brigden's selection to the Canadian Olympic team in 1952 was notable due to his age and his province of origin. He was 36 years old at the Games, unusually old for an Olympic "rookie" and the oldest member of that Canadian canoe sprint team. His K-2 partner in Helsinki, James Nickel, was 14 years his junior. Since Brigden in 1952, no athlete from Manitoba has been selected to an Olympic canoe sprint team.

Brigden lived his entire life in Winnipeg and had three children. He was inducted into the Manitoba Sports Hall of Fame in 1992.
