= Canoeing at the 1952 Summer Olympics – Men's K-2 1000 metres =

These are the results of the men's K-2 1000 metres competition in canoeing at the 1952 Summer Olympics. The K-2 event is raced by two-man canoe sprint kayaks. Heats and final took place on July 28.

== Medalists ==
Gold	Silver	Bronze
Kurt Wires and Yrjö Hietanen (FIN)	Lars Glassér and Ingemar Hedberg (SWE)	Maximilian Raub and Herbert Wiedermann (AUT)

== Heats ==
The 19 teams first raced in three heats. The top three teams in each heat advanced directly to the final.

Heat 1
1.	Lars Glassér and Ingemar Hedberg (SWE)	3:51.7	QF
2.	Kurt Wires and Yrjö Hietanen (FIN)	3:53.0	QF
3.	Egon Dyg and Andreas Lind (DEN)	3:53.3	QF
4.	Anatoly Troshenkov and Igor Kuznetsov (URS)	3:54.0
5.	Jan Matocha and Otto Kroutil (TCH)	3:56.3
6.	Eligio Valentino and Pio Vennettilli (ITA)	4:03.8
7.	Frank Prout and Roland Prout (GBR)	4:07.6
Heat 2
1.	Max Raub and Herbert Wiedermann (AUT)	3:55.2	QF
2.	Gustav Schmidt and Helmut Noller (GER)	3:55.7	QF
3.	Ivar Mathisen and Knut Østby (NOR)	3:58.2	QF
4.	Heinrich Hess and Kurt Zimmer (SAA)	4:01.4
5.	Anton Kuster and Hans Straub (SUI)	4:14.9
6.	Johnny Lucas and Léon Roth (LUX)	4:21.6
Heat 3
1.	Cees Koch and Jan Klingers (NED)	3:54.3	QF
2.	István Granek and János Kulcsár (HUN)	3:54.5	QF
3.	Maurice Graffen and Marcel Renaud (FRA)	3:54.8	QF
4.	Frans Van den Berghen and Albert Van de Vliet (BEL)	3:59.2
5.	Thomas Horton and John Eiseman (USA)	4:02.9
6.	Robert Cordner and George Ward (CAN)	4:27.5

== Final ==
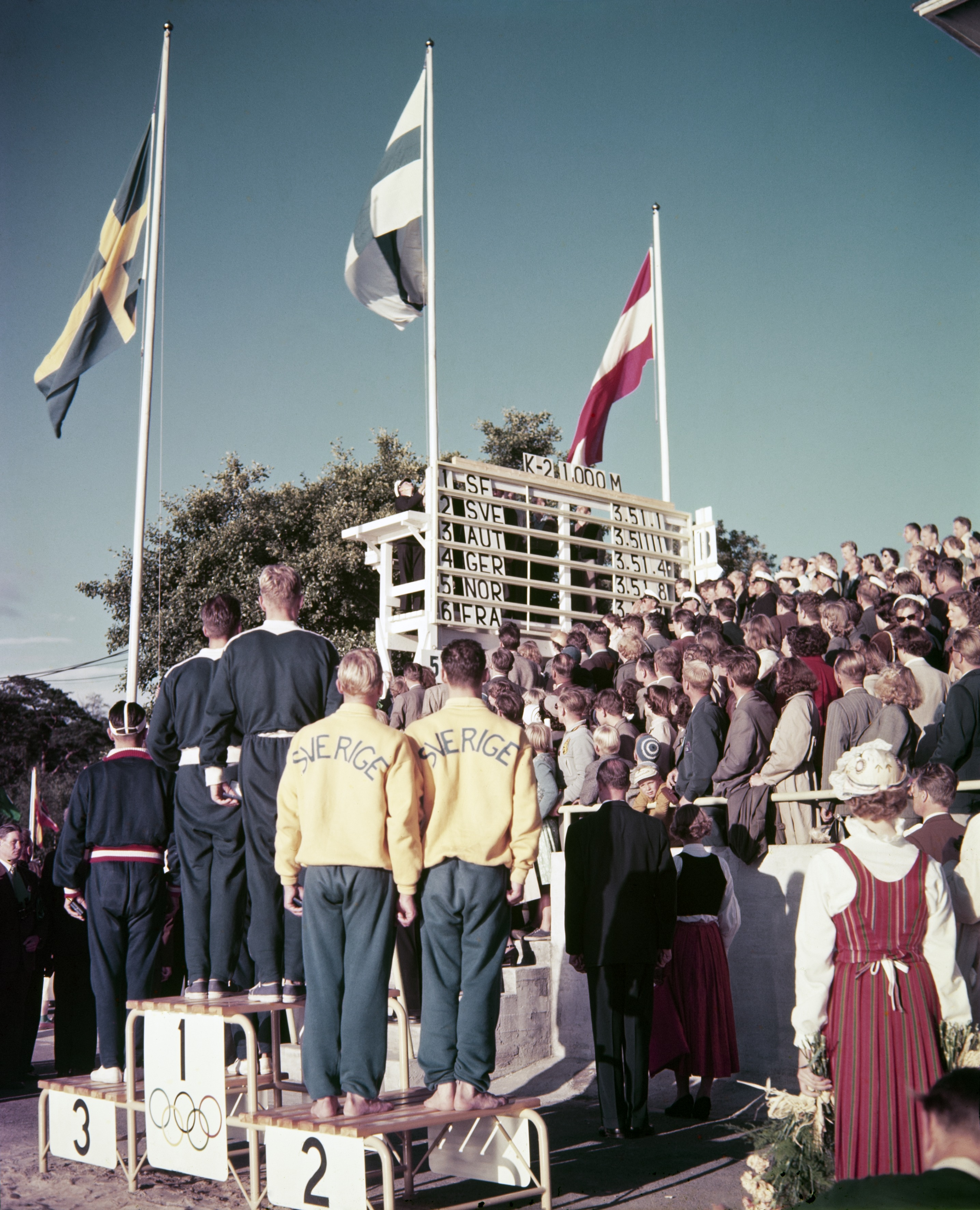
Medal ceremony

Gold	Kurt Wires and Yrjö Hietanen (FIN)	3:51.1
Silver	Lars Glassér and Ingemar Hedberg (SWE)	3:51.1
Bronze	Max Raub and Herbert Wiedermann (AUT)	3:51.4
4.	Gustav Schmidt and Helmut Noller (GER)	3:51.8
5.	Ivar Mathisen and Knut Østby (NOR)	3:54.7
6.	Maurice Graffen and Marcel Renaud (FRA)	3:55.1
7.	István Granek and János Kulcsár (HUN)	3:55.1
8.	Cees Koch and Jan Klingers (NED)	3:55.8
9.	Egon Dyg and Andreas Lind (DEN)	3:59.3

The Finnish duo won the gold medal after studying a photo finish of the event.
