= Marzano =

Marzano may refer to:

- Marzano, Pavia, a municipality in Lombardy, Italy
- Marzano (surname), an Italian surname
- Marzano Appio, a municipality in Campania, Italy
- Marzano di Nola, a municipality in Campania, Italy
- Marzano family, a medieval Italian noble family
- Marzano, Vibo Valentia, a village near Dasà, Italy
- Marzano, Lodi, a village near Merlino, Italy
- Marzano, Torino, a village near Mompantero, Italy
- Marzano, Parma, a village near Terenzo, Italy
- Marzano, Genova, a village near Torriglia, Italy

== See also ==
- San Marzano (disambiguation)
