= Cees Koch =

Cees Koch may refer to:

- Cees Koch (canoeist) (1925–2024), Dutch sprint canoer
- Cees Koch (discus thrower) (1936–2021), Dutch discus thrower and shot putter
