= Bastoni =

Bastoni is an Italian surname. Notable people with the surname include:

- Alessandro Bastoni (born 1999), Italian footballer
- Guglielmo Bastoni (1544–1609), Italian Roman Catholic Bishop of Pavia and Apostolic Nuncio to Naples
- Pietro Bastoni (1570–1622), Italian Roman Catholic bishop
- Raffaele Bastoni (1925–1992), Italian sprint canoeist
- Simone Bastoni (born 1996), Italian football player
- Steve Bastoni (born 1966), Australian actor
