= Duranty =

Duranty may refer to:

- Louis Edmond Duranty (1833–1880), French journalist and art critic
- Walter Duranty (1884–1957), Anglo-American propagandist, Moscow bureau chief of The New York Times 1922–1936

== See also ==
- Durante
