= Deontay =

Deontay is an English-language masculine given name, meaning 'of Zeus' or 'lasting, enduring'. It is often found among African Americans. Notable people with the given name include:

- Deontay Burnett (born 1997), American football wide receiver
- Deontay Greenberry (born 1994), American former football wide receiver
- Deontay Wilder (born 1985), American professional boxer

== See also ==
- Dontay
- Deonte
