= Igor Kuznetsov =

Igor Kuznetsov may refer to:

- Igor Kuznetsov (ice hockey) (born 1955), Kazakhstani-German ice hockey player and businessman
- Igor Kuznetsov (canoeist) (1929–2000), Soviet sprint canoer
