= Werner Müller =

Werner Müller may refer to:

- Werner Müller (ethnologist) (1907–1990), German ethnologist and symbologist
- Werner Müller (musician) (1920–1998), German musician
- Werner Müller (canoeist) (born 1922), Swiss canoeist
- Werner Müller (politician) (1946–2019), German manager and politician, Minister for Economics
- Werner Müller (mathematician) (born 1949), German mathematician
- Werner Mueller (sport shooter), Austrian competitor in shooting at the 1988 Summer Paralympics

== See also ==
- Otto-Werner Mueller (1926–2016), German-born conductor
