= Paul Bochenwich =

American canoeist

Paul Bochnewich (January 28, 1925 in Yonkers, New York - November 14, 2001) was an American sprint canoer who competed in the early 1950s. He finished 14th in the K-2 10000 m event at the 1952 Summer Olympics in Helsinki.
