= Marzano (surname) =

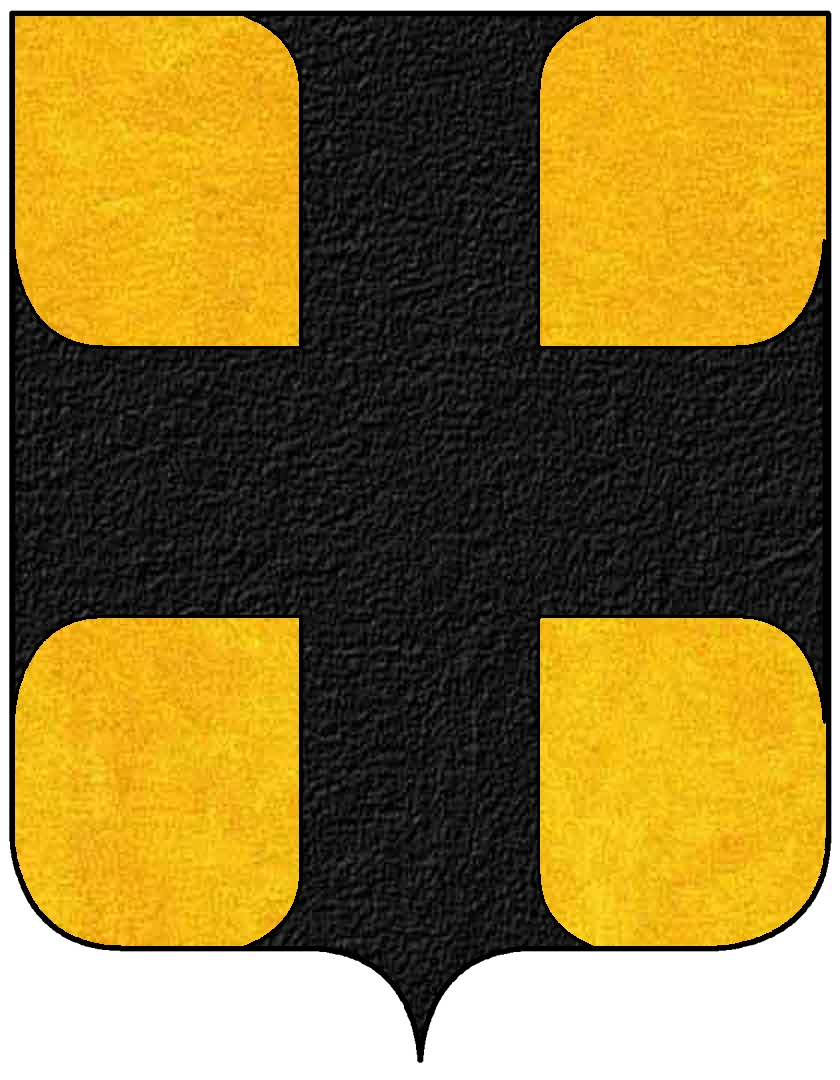
Coat of arms of the Marzano noble family

The Marzano family was an old medieval Italian noble family originated in the Kingdom of Naples. The Head of the family held the titles Prince of Rossano, Duke of Sessa and Duke of Squillace. Members of the family intermarried with other most significant families of the region. They went extinct at the beginning of the 16th century.

== Notable members of the family ==
- Goffredo Marzano, Count of Squillace (1300–1362), Grand admiral of Naples
- Goffredo Marzano, Count of Alife (1350-1404), Grand chamberlain of Naples

== Marzano (surname) ==
Marzano is also an Italian surname.

== Notable people with surname Marzano ==
- Annalisa Marzano (born 1969), Italian-American archaeologist
- Antonio Marzano (born 1935), Italian economist and politician
- John Marzano (1963–2008), American baseball player
- Marco Marzano (born 1980), Italian cyclist
- Michela Marzano (born 1970), Italian writer and politician
- Robert J. Marzano, American educational researcher
- Stefano Marzano (born 1950), Italian designer
