= Daunte =

Daunte is a given name. Notable people with the name include:

- Daunte Culpepper (born 1977), American football player
- Daunte Wright (died 2021), African American man fatally shot during an arrest

== See also ==
- Dante (name), given name and surname
