= Yrjö Hietanen =

Finnish canoeist (1927–2011)

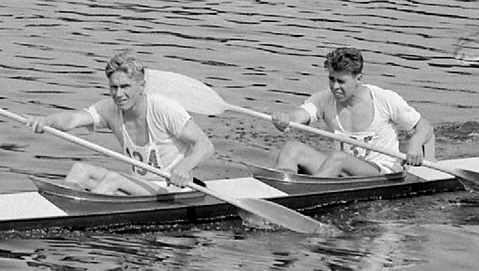
- Hietanen (left) and Kurt Wires at the 1952 Olympics

Personal information
- Born: 12 July 1927 Helsinki, Finland
- Died: 26 March 2011 (aged 83) Helsinki, Finland
- Height: 174 cm (5 ft 9 in)
- Weight: 72–74 kg (159–163 lb)

Sport
- Sport: Canoe racing
- Club: Merimelojat, Helsinki
Medal record
Representing Finland
Olympic Games
Gold medal – first place	1952 Helsinki	K-2 1000 m
Gold medal – first place	1952 Helsinki	K-2 10000 m

Yrjö Jalmari "Yka" Hietanen (12 July 1927 – 26 March 2011) was a Finnish canoe sprinter who competed at the 1952 and 1956 Olympics. In 1952 he won two gold medals with Kurt Wires in the 1000 m and 10000 m events. In 1956 he placed seventh over 10000 m.
