= Dante (disambiguation) =

Dante Alighieri was a 13th–14th century Florentine poet.

Dante may also refer to:

== Arts and entertainment ==
- Dante Sonata, by Franz Liszt, 1849
- Dante Symphony, a choral symphony by Franz Liszt, 1857
- Dante (album), by Show Luo, 2012
- Dante XXI, a 2006 album by Brazilian thrash metal band Sepultura
- Danté and The Evergreens, an American pop group in 1960
- Dante et Béatrice, an 1890 opera by Benjamin Godard
- Dante (TV series), a 1960–61 NBC crime drama

== People ==
- Dante (name), a given name and surname, including a list of people and fictional characters with the name
- Dante (comedian) (Jay Dante Rusciolelli, born 1970)
- Dante (footballer) (Dante Bonfim Costa Santos, born 1983)
- Bernabe Buscayno (fl. 1960–1976), or Kumander Dante, founder of the New People's Army in the Philippines
- Dante the Great, stage name of Oscar Eliason (1869–1899)
- Dante the Magician, stage name of Harry August Jansen (1883–1955)
- Count Dante, American karate instructor John Timothy Keehan (1939–1975)
- Dante, a pseudonym of Roger Squires (1932–2023), British crossword compiler

== Places ==
- Dante, South Dakota, U.S.
- Dante, Virginia, U.S.
- Dante (crater), on the Moon
- Dante (Naples Metro), Italy, a metro station
- Dante (Turin Metro), Italy, a metro station
- Dante Park, in New York City, U.S.
- Dante River, in Guam
- Hafun, Somalia, known as Dante during Italian colonial rule

== Science and technology ==
- DANTE (Delivery of Advanced Network Technology to Europe), a computer networking organisation
- Dante (networking), a commercial audio-over-Ethernet protocol
- Deutschsprachige Anwendervereinigung TeX (DANTE e.V.), the German-language TeX users group

== Other uses ==
- Dante (bar), in New York City, U.S.
- Dante (horse), a British Thoroughbred racehorse
  - Dante Stakes, a British horse race
- Dante (typeface), a typeface designed by Giovanni Mardersteig
- Dante (collection), a fashion collection by Alexander McQueen

== See also ==
- Dante and Beatrice (disambiguation)
- Dante's Inferno (disambiguation)
- X-chair, also known as a Dante chair
