= Robert Cordner =

Canadian canoeist (1932–2025)

- Born: February 1, 1932; Verdun, Québec, Canada
- Died: June 10, 2025 (aged 93); Montréal (LaSalle), Québec, Canada

Robert Cordner (February 1, 1932 – June 10, 2025) was a Canadian sprint canoer who competed in the early 1950s. At the 1952 Summer Olympics in Helsinki, he was eliminated in the heats of the K-2 1000 m event.

After his Olympic career, Cordner became the longest-serving city councilor of LaSalle, holding office from 1971 to 1983 and again from 1991 to 1995.

Cordner died on June 10 2025, at the age of 93.
