= Johnny Lucas (canoeist) =

Luxembourgish canoeist

Personal information
- National team: Luxembourg
- Born: 12 August 1931 Diekirch, Luxembourg
- Died: 19 October 1993 (aged 62) Diekirch, Luxembourg
- Years active: Early 1950s

Sport
- Sport: Canoe sprint

Johnny Lucas (12 August 1931 – 19 October 1993) was a Luxembourgish sprint canoer who competed in the early 1950s. He was born and died in Diekirch. Competing alongside Léon Roth at the 1952 Summer Olympics in Helsinki, he was eliminated in the heats of the K-2 1000 m event.
