= Egon Dyg =

Danish sprint canoer

Egon Dyg (5 February 1927 – 3 October 2013) was a Danish sprint canoeist who competed in the early 1950s. He finished ninth in the K-2 1000 m event at the 1952 Summer Olympics in Helsinki.
