= Heinrich Hess (canoeist) =

Saar sprint canoeist (1928–1993)

Heinrich Hess (27 February 1928 – 18 August 1993) was a Saar sprint canoeist who competed in the early 1950s. He was born in Saarbrücken. At the 1952 Summer Olympics in Helsinki, he finished 12th in the K-2 10000 m event while being eliminated in the heats of the K-2 1000 m event.
