= Karl-Heinz Schäfer =

German canoeist

Karl-Heinz Schäfer (born 3 May 1921) is a German sprint canoeist who competed in the early 1950s. He finished sixth in the K-2 10000 m event at the 1952 Summer Olympics in Helsinki.
