= János Kulcsár =

Hungarian canoeist

János Kulcsár (2 March 1927 – 27 June 1989) was a Hungarian sprint canoeist who competed in the early 1950s. At the 1952 Summer Olympics in Helsinki, he finished seventh in the K-2 1000 m event. He was born in Budapest.
