= Jan Klingers =

Dutch canoeist

Jan Klingers (28 August 1929 in Zaandam – 22 April 1994 in Zaandam) was a Dutch sprint canoer who competed in the early 1950s. At the 1952 Summer Olympics in Helsinki, he finished eighth in the K-2 1000 m event and ninth in the K-2 10000 m event.
