= Donta =

Donta is a given name and surname. Notable people with the name include:

== Given name ==
- Donta Abron (born 1972), American football player
- Donta Hall (born 1997), American professional basketball player
- Donta Jones (born 1972), American football player
- Donta Smith (born 1983), American-Venezuelan basketball player, 2014 Israeli Basketball Premier League MVP

== Surname ==
- Eleni Donta (born 1980), Greek marathon runner
- Praveen Kumar Donta (born 1990), Indian Computer Science Researcher working in Austria - (https://dsg.tuwien.ac.at/team/pdonta/)

== See also ==
- Dont'a Hightower (born 1990), American football player
- D'Onta Foreman (born 1996), American football player
- Dontae, given name
- Donte, given name
