= Anton Kuster =

Swiss canoeist

Anton Kuster (born 31 July 1923) is a Swiss sprint canoeist who competed in the early 1950s. At the 1952 Summer Olympics in Helsinki, he was eliminated in the heats of the K-2 1000 m event.
