= Faustino Duranti =

Italian painter

Count Faustino Duranti (1695–1766) was an Italian painter, mainly of illumination and miniature portraits. He was also a cleric of the Baroque period, mainly active in his native Brescia which was for all his life part of the Republic of venice. He became an abbot after his brother, Giorgio Duranti's death.
