= Werner Bieri =

Swiss sprint canoer (1924–2016)

Werner Bieri (26 July 1924 – 18 January 2010) was a Swiss sprint canoer who competed in the early 1950s. He finished 16th in the K-2 10000 m event at the 1952 Summer Olympics in Helsinki. Bieri died in 2010.

== Sources ==
- Werner Bieri's profile at Sports Reference.com
