= Dontae =

Dontae is a given name. Notable people with the given name include:

- Dontae Balfour (born 2002), American football player
- Dontae Fleming (born 2001), American football player
- Dontae Johnson (born 1991), American football player
- Dontae' Jones (born 1975), American basketball player
- Dontae Morris (born 1985), American serial killer
- Dontae Richards-Kwok (born 1989), Canadian sprinter

== See also ==
- Donta, given name and surname
- Donte, given name
- Dontay, given name
