= Pio Vennettilli =

Italian canoeist

Pio Vennettilli (29 October 1927 – 6 July 1976) was an Italian sprint canoer who competed in the early 1950s. He was eliminated in the heats of the K-2 1000 m event at the 1952 Summer Olympics in Helsinki.
