= Kurt Wires =

Finnish canoeist

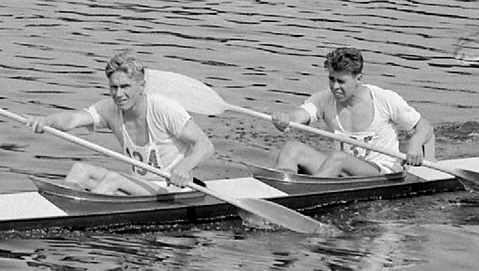
- Wires (right) and Yrjö Hietanen at the 1952 Olympics

Personal information
- Born: 28 April 1919 Helsinki, Finland
- Died: 22 February 1992 (aged 72) Espoo, Finland
- Height: 176 cm (5 ft 9 in)
- Weight: 74 kg (163 lb)

Sport
- Sport: Canoe racing
Medal record
Representing Finland
Olympic Games
Silver medal – second place	1948 London	K-1 10000 m
Gold medal – first place	1952 Helsinki	K-2 1000 m
Gold medal – first place	1952 Helsinki	K-2 10000 m

Kurt Oskar "Kurre" Wires (28 April 1919 – 22 February 1992) was a Finnish canoe sprinter who competed in the 1948 and 1952 Olympics. In 1948 he won a silver medal in the individual 10000 m event. Four years later he earned two gold medals in the 1000 m and 10000 m doubles, together with Yrjö Hietanen.

== Personal life ==
Wires served in the Finnish Army during the Second World War and lost his right eye during the Continuation War.
