= Kurt Zimmer =

German canoeist (1924–2008)

Kurt Zimmer (19 July 1924 – 19 January 2008) was a Saar sprint canoer who competed in the early 1950s. He was born in Saarbrücken. At the 1952 Summer Olympics in Helsinki, he finished 12th in the K-2 10000 m event while being eliminated in the heats of the K-2 1000 m event.
