= István Granek =

Hungarian canoeist

István Granek (23 December 1926 - 21 June 1971) was a Hungarian sprint canoeist who competed in the early 1950s. At the 1952 Summer Olympics in Helsinki, he finished seventh in the K-2 1000 m event.
