= Eugène Hanck =

Luxembourgish canoeist

Eugène Hanck (1 February 1928 – 13 November 2013) was a Luxembourgish sprint canoeist born in Attert, Belgium, who competed in the early 1950s. He finished 18th in the K-2 10000 m event at the 1952 Summer Olympics in Helsinki. In 2008, he was promoted to the rank of Chevalier in the Order of Merit of the Grand Duchy of Luxembourg.
