= Eligio Valentino =

Italian canoeist

Eligio Valentino (19 July 1925 – 10 October 2012) was an Italian canoe sprinter who competed in the early 1950s. He was eliminated in the heats of the K-2 1000 m event at the 1952 Summer Olympics in Helsinki.
