= Helmut Noller =

German canoeist (1919–2009)

Medal record

Men's canoe sprint

World Championships
Bronze medal – third place	1954 Mâcon	K-2 1000 m

Helmut Noller (16 November 1919 – 28 March 2009) was a German sprint canoeist who competed in the early 1950s. He finished fourth in the K-2 1000 m event at the 1952 Summer Olympics in Helsinki.
