= John Anderson (canoeist) =

American canoeist

John J. Anderson (April 2, 1924 – March 15, 2001) was an American sprint canoer who competed in the early 1950s. He finished 14th in the K-2 10000 m event at the 1952 Summer Olympics in Helsinki.
