= Georges Kunz =

French canoeist

Georges Kunz (17 January 1922 – 4 September 2014) was a French sprint canoeist who competed in the early 1950s. He finished 13th in the K-2 10000 m event at the 1952 Summer Olympics in Helsinki.
