= József Gurovits =

Hungarian canoeist (1928–2021)

Olympic medal record

Men's canoe sprint
Bronze medal – third place	1952 Helsinki	K-2 10000 m

József Gurovits (23 November 1928 – 3 March 2021) was a Hungarian sprint canoer who competed in the early 1950s. He won a bronze medal in the K-2 10000 m event at the 1952 Summer Olympics in Helsinki. Gurovits was born in Budapest. He was married to speed skater Mária Földvári-Boér. As of 2018 they had been living together in Zürich, Switzerland for 62 years and went back to Hungary once or twice a year. In 2021, Gurovits died in Zurich at the age of 92.
