= Raymond Parker (canoeist) =

British sprint canoeist

Raymond Parker (24 October 1919 – 19 January 2009) was a British sprint canoeist who competed in the early 1950s. He finished 15th in the K-2 10000 m event at the 1952 Summer Olympics in Helsinki.
