= Nikolay Teterkin =

Soviet sprint canoer

Nikolay Teterkin (Russian: Николай Тетеркин) (28 July 1924 – 9 February 2003) was a Soviet sprint canoeist who competed in the early 1950s. He finished tenth in the K-2 10000 m event at the 1952 Summer Olympics in Helsinki.
