= San Marzano =

San Marzano may refer to:

- San Marzano tomato, Italian variety of tomatoes
- San Marzano di San Giuseppe, Italian municipality in the Province of Taranto, Apulia
- San Marzano Oliveto, Italian municipality in the Province of Asti, Piedmont
- San Marzano sul Sarno, Italian municipality in the Province of Salerno, Campania

== See also ==
- Marzano (disambiguation)
