= George Ward (footballer, born 1877) =

Australian rules footballer

Personal information
- Full name: George Henry Ward
- Born: 22 April 1877; Richmond, Victoria
- Died: 2 August 1921 (aged 44); Alphington, Victoria
- Original team: Richmond City Juniors

Playing career^{1}
Years	Club	Games (Goals)
1901	Essendon	1 (0)
- ^{1} Playing statistics correct to the end of 1901.

George Henry Ward (22 April 1877 – 2 August 1921) was an Australian rules footballer who played with Essendon in the Victorian Football League (VFL).

== Family ==
The son of Arthur James Ward (1847-1914), and Helen Ward (1846-1928), née Gardner, George Henry Ward was born in Richmond, Victoria on 22 April 1877.

== Military service ==
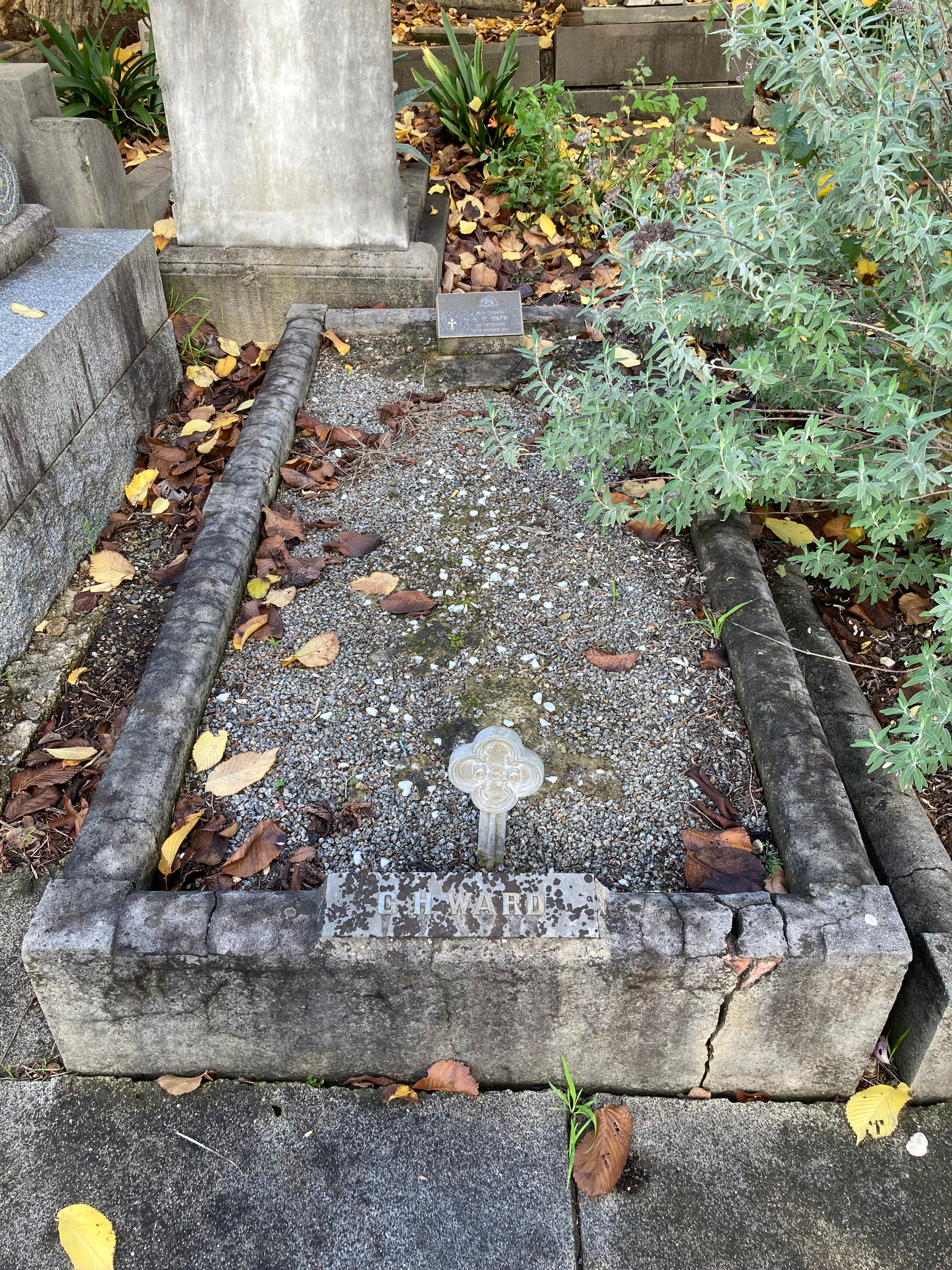
Ward's grave at Boroondara General Cemetery

He enlisted in the First AIF on 6 July 1915, and served overseas with the 60th Battalion. He was wounded in action, in France, on 19 July 1916, where he sustained gunshot wounds to his right arm and left leg. He required four operations, and his left leg was amputated mid-thigh, in France. He was repatriated to England, and spent more than 12 months hospitalized there. He was declared unfit for general service in November 1917, and left England in March 1918, returning to Australia in May 1918.

== Death ==
He killed himself "while suffering from [war caused] mental depression" in the dressing shed at the Yarra bathing ground, in Alphington, Victoria, in August 1921 (he was last seen on 2 August 1921, and his body was discovered, with the throat cut, and a razor lying near the body, on 11 August 1921). He was buried at the Boroondara General Cemetery on 13 August 1921.
