= Graham Palmer =

British sprint canoeist (1921-1994)

Graham Palmer (23 January 1921 – 24 December 1994) was a British sprint canoeist, born in London, who competed in the early 1950s. He finished 15th in the K-2 10,000m event at the 1952 Summer Olympics in Helsinki. He also competed in other events.

The 18 year old Palmer fought in World War II and was taken prisoner in France in 1940. The account of his five years of captivity is detailed in his memoirs: Prisoner of Death: A Gripping Memoir of Courage and Survival Under the Third Reich. After the war, he resumed his career as a quantity surveyor, eventually becoming a partner in a firm during 20 years. He later established his own company on the continent, till he retired. He died in 1994, 73 years old, survived by two sons, a daughter and eight grandchildren.
