= Maximilian Raub =

Austrian sprint canoer (1926–2019)

Medal record

Men's canoe sprint

Olympic Games
Bronze medal – third place	1952 Helsinki	K-2 1000 m
Bronze medal – third place	1956 Melbourne	K-2 1000 m

World Championships
Gold medal – first place	1954 Mâcon	K-2 10000 m
Bronze medal – third place	1950 Copenhagen	K-1 4 x 500 m
Bronze medal – third place	1950 Copenhagen	K-2 500 m
Bronze medal – third place	1954 Mâcon	K-1 4 x 500 m

Maximilian "Max" Raub (Vienna, 13 April 1926 – 17 November 2019) was an Austrian sprint canoer who competed in the 1950s. Competing in two Summer Olympics, he won two bronze medals in the K-2 1000 m event (1952, 1956). Raub also won four medals at the ICF Canoe Sprint World Championships with a gold (K-2 10000 m: 1954) and three bronzes (K-1 4 x 500 m: 1950, 1954; K-2 500 m: 1950).
