= Igor Kuznetsov (canoeist) =

Soviet sprint canoer

Igor Kuznetsov (1929–2000) was a Soviet sprint canoer who competed in the early 1950s. He was eliminated in the heats of the K-2 1000 m event at the 1952 Summer Olympics in Helsinki.
