= Live at Donte's =

Live at Donte's may refer to:

- Live at Donte's (Jean-Luc Ponty album)
- Live at Donte's (Joe Pass album)
- Live at Donte's (Lenny Breau album)
