= George Ward (footballer, born 1889) =

Australian rules footballer

Personal information
- Full name: George Grant Ward
- Born: 4 July 1889; Hawthorn, Victoria
- Died: 18 February 1928 (aged 38); Prahran, Victoria

Playing career^{1}
Years	Club	Games (Goals)
1909	Richmond	1 (0)
- ^{1} Playing statistics correct to the end of 1909.

George Grant Ward (4 July 1889 – 18 February 1928) was an Australian rules footballer who played with Richmond in the Victorian Football League (VFL).

== Death ==
He died on 18 February 1928.
