= Werner Müller (canoeist) =

Swiss canoeist (born 1922)

Werner Müller (born 7 September 1922) is a Swiss sprint canoer who competed in the early 1950s. He finished 16th in the K-2 10000 m event at the 1952 Summer Olympics in Helsinki.
