= Josy Doyon =

Austrian-Swiss writer and translator

Josy Doyon-Hofstetter (12 May 1932 – 24 August 2011) was an Austrian-Swiss mountain farmer and writer. Doyon was a self-taught writer and began her literary career as a poet. She later turned to writing prose, including stories and novels. Her works often focused on the lives and struggles of mountain farmers in Switzerland and Austria. She is considered an important figure in the Swiss-German literature of the 20th century.

== Early life and career ==
Josy Doyon was born on 12 May 1932, in Innsbruck, Austria. Her mother died when Doyon was ten, and her father died in the Czech Republic at the end of the Second World War. When she was eighteen, Doyon moved to Switzerland to live with adoptive mother Alice Hofstetter, in Spiez. Doyon married Georges Doyon on 25 May 1957, and they had four children together. The family lived in Spiez and then in Thun, before moving to a farm in Zihl, in the Frutigen region. In 1971 they moved again, to Adelboden and then back to Spiez, due to Georges' deteriorating health.

Doyon was a self-taught writer and began her literary career as a poet. She later turned to writing prose, including stories and novels. One of her first works was an account of the 'adventure' of becoming a mountain farmer. Her works often focused on the lives and struggles of mountain farmers in Switzerland and Austria. She is considered an important figure in the Swiss-German literature of the 20th century. She contributed to a 1973 issue of the literary journal Guten Schriften, translating works by authors such as Marie-Louise Dreier. Doyon was a member of the Bernese Writers' Association.

Doyon died on 24 August 2011. She had twelve grandchildren.

== Publications ==
Year	Title	Place published	ISBN
1966	Shepherds without mercy	Zürich	
1980	Becoming a mountain farmer, what an adventure	Blaukreuz, Bern	3-85580-126-6
1980	Zryd Rösli and her village	Blaukreuz, Bern	85580-110-X .
