= Annalisa Insardà =

Italian actress (born 1978)

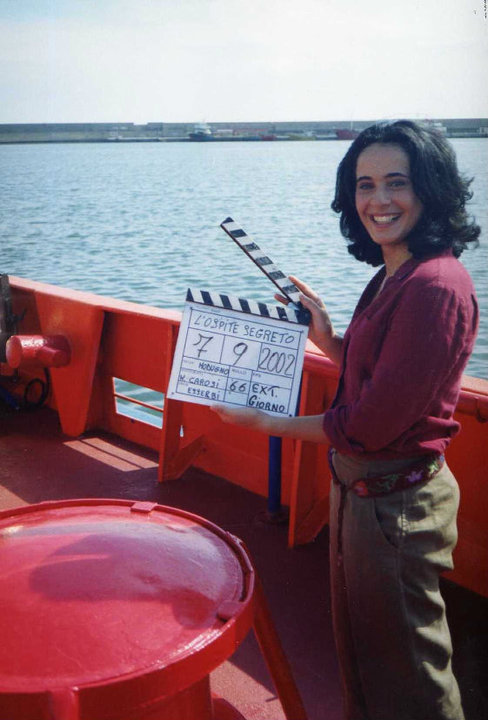
Annalisa (2002)

Annalisa Insardà (born October 13, 1978 in Polistena), grown up in Laureana di Borrello (province of Reggio Calabria, southern Italy), is an Italian film, TV, theater and voice actress. She is also an acting teacher in Rome.

== Theatre (in Italy) ==
- 1998 The Threepenny Opera
- 1998 The Trojan Women
- 2005 Seven Against Thebes
- 2005 When Love Speaks
- 2005 Medea
- 2006 Don Giovanni (Mozart) di Franco Ricci
- 2006 Viaggio vuol dire mare di autori contemporanei, regia di Manuel Giliberti
- 2006 Lasciami stare regia di Manuel Giliberti (2006)
- 2007 Edipo e la sfinge, regia di Manuel Giliberti
- 2008 Didone, directed di Manuel Giliberti
- 2012 Gaber... scik come me! testi di Giorgio Gaber e Luporini (2012)
- 2013 Reality Shock with Annalisa Insardà (2013)
- 2016 Matrimoni ed altri effetti collaterali di Ivan Campillo, regia di Manuel Giliberti (2016)
- 2017 Medea di Antonio Tarantino (2017)
- 2019 Manipolazione indolore Annalisa Insardà
- 2020 Novantanovesimo cancello by Enza Tomaselli

== Filmography ==
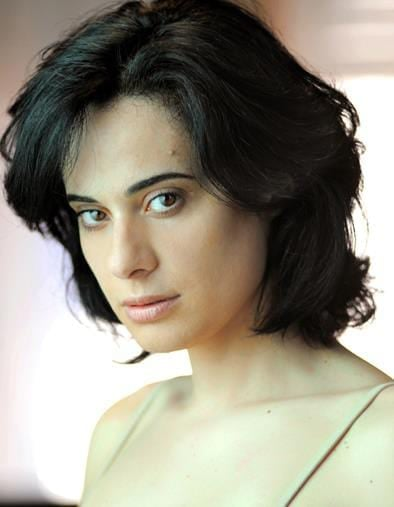
Annalisa in 2011

- 2000 Ricominciare (Italian soap opera)
- 2002 Vivere (Italian soap opera)
- 2003 L'ospite segreto (movie)
- 2004 Un battito di vita (Short subject)
- 2005 Lettere dalla Sicilia (movie)
- 2006 Carabinieri 6 (fiction)
- 2007 Un caso di coscienza 3 (fiction)
- 2007 É tempo di cambiare (movie)
- 2009 Pochi giorni per capire (film), directed by Carlo Fusco;
- 2009 "Grigioscuro" (corto), directed by Enzo Carone
- 2011 "Invidia" directed by Robert Gilbert
- 2011 "Alberi al vento", directed by Luca Fortino
- 2011 "Tienimi stretto", directed by Luca Fortino ...Lucia altri interpreti Peppino Mazzotta, Salvatore Lazzaro
- 2011 “Piacere io sono Piero”, directed by Enzo Carone ..Lucia Licata
- 2017 Primula rossa, regia di Franco Jannuzzi
- 2018 “I nostri figli”, (fiction) directed by Andrea Porporati ..Lorenza Carbone
- 2020 “Come una madre”, (fiction) ..Matilde
- 2021 Doc ..Milena
- 2023 Lolita Lobosco, directed by Luca Miniero -
- 2023Imma Tataranni - Sostituto procuratore , directed by Francesco Amato - serie TV,
- 2022 La festa del ritorno di Lorenzo Adorisio
- 2023 Come le tartarughe, regia di Monica Dugo
- 2023 Il migliore dei mali directed by Violetta Rovetto
