= Donte =

Donte is a given name. Notable people with the given name include:

- Donté Clark (born 1977), American poet
- Donté Curry (born 1978), American football player
- Donte DiVincenzo (born 1997), American basketball player
- Donte Foster (born 1990), American football player
- Donte Gamble (born 1978), American football player
- Donté Greene (born 1988), American basketball player
- Donte Jackson (American football) (born 1995), American football player
- Donte Jackson (basketball) (born 1979), American basketball coach
- Donte Kent (born 2001), American football player
- Donte Moncrief (born 1993), American football player
- Donte Nicholson (born 1981), American football player
- Donte Paige-Moss (born 1991), American football player
- Donté Stallworth (born 1980), American football player
- Dont'e Thornton (born 2002), American football player
- Donte Whitner (born 1985), American football player
- Donte Williams (born 1982), American football coach

== Fictional characters ==
- Donté Drumm, The Confession
- The rebooted version of Dante from the Devil May Cry series that featured in DmC: Devil May Cry.
- Donte Charles from the series Waterloo Road.

== Places ==
- Donte’s - a defunct jazz club in Los Angeles

== See also ==
- Live at Donte's (disambiguation)
- Dante (name)
- Dontae, given name
