= Annalisa Malara =

Italian intensive care physician (born 1982)

- Born: 1982 (age 43–44)
- Occupation: medical doctor

Annalisa Malara is an Italian doctor and author. She is an intensivist and anaesthesiologist in Codogno, Italy. She treated the first COVID-19 patient in Italy. She was named "personality of the year" by SkyTg24, a satellite news channel. She has written a book about her work. In October 2020, she was appointed as Knight of the Order of Merit of the Italian Republic.

== Life ==
Malara was born in Cremona in Lombardy, and trained in anaesthesiology and resuscitation and at the University of Pavia. She worked at the Policlinico San Matteo in Pavia, and at the Civil Hospital of Vigevano and then at the Ospedale Maggiore in Lodi.

Malara is an intensivist and anaesthesiologist in Codogno, Italy. She tested, diagnosed and treated the first COVID-19 patient in Italy. On 20 February 2020 Malara was called in to attend a 38 year old male patient who presented with a high fever and pneumonia in both lungs. Malara learned from the patient's wife that he had dined two weeks previously with a colleague who had just returned from China. Malara tested the patient for COVID-19, even though guidelines at the time recommended only testing patients who had been in China themselves. When the test returned a positive result, he became "patient one", the first European COVID-19 patient to have caught the disease in Europe.

== Awards ==
Malara was named "personality of the year" by SkyTg24, a satellite news channel. She has written a book about her work, a memoir covering the months after patient one was diagnosed. In 2020 Malara was awarded a Rosa Camuna by the President of the Lombardy Region, Attilio Fontana.

In October 2020, she was appointed as Knight of the Order of Merit of the Italian Republic.
