= Deonte =

Deonte is a given name. Notable people with the given name include:

- Deonte Anderson (born 2002), American football player
- Deonte Banks (born 2001), American football player
- Deonte Brown (born 1998), American football player
- Deonte Burton (basketball, born 1991) (born 1991), American basketball player
- Deonte Burton (basketball, born 1994) (born 1994), American basketball player
- Deonte Harris (born 1997), American football player
- Deonte Thompson (born 1989), American football player
- Deonte Wells-Taylor (born 1991), American football player, A7FL
