= James Nickel =

Canadian canoeist

Personal information
- Nationality: Canadian
- Born: 9 February 1930
- Died: 28 March 1990 (aged 60)

James Nickel (9 February 1930 – 30 March 1990) was a Canadian canoe sprinter who competed in the early 1950s. He finished 11th in the K-2 10000 m event at the 1952 Summer Olympics in Helsinki. He was a member of the Royal Canadian Mounted Police at the time, and remained with the RCMP until his retirement from the position of Commanding Officer of Regina Subdivision in 1987. During his career he was posted at RCMP detachments in Uranium Lake, Tisdale, Regina, Kipling, Punnichy, Hudson Bay, Swift Current, and Winnipeg.
