= Kristina Durante =

American evolutionary psychologist

Kristina M. Durante
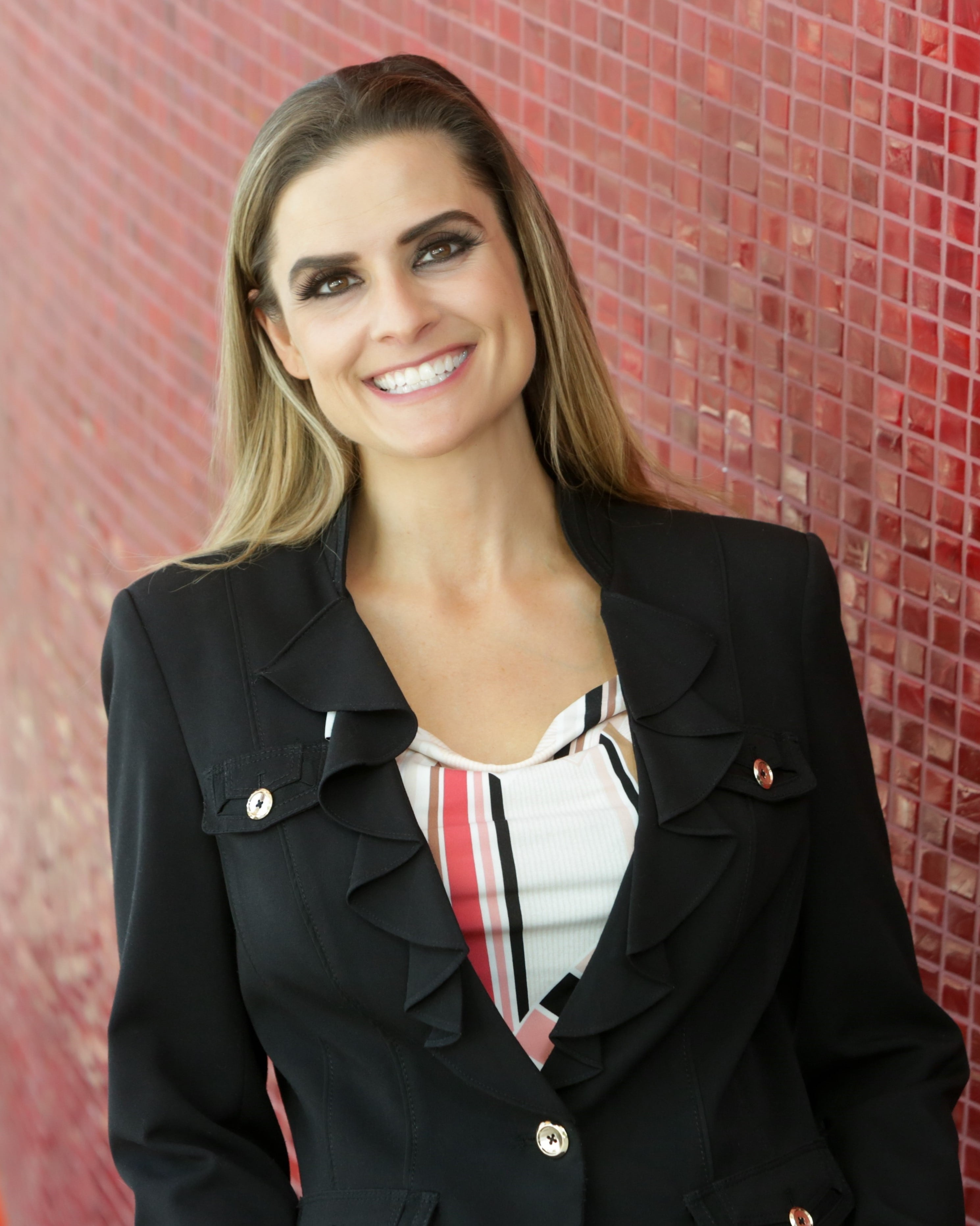
- Born: November 10, 1973 (age 52)
- Occupations: Evolutionary psychologist, field evolutionary psychology, author and academic
- Spouse: Alan Gajda (m. 2024)
- Children: 2

Academic background
- Education: Boston University (BS); University of Chicago (MA); University of Texas at Austin (PhD)
- Alma mater: Boston University; University of Texas at Austin

Kristina M. Durante (born November 10, 1973) is an American evolutionary psychologist, author, and academic. She is a chaired professor at Rutgers Business School – Newark and New Brunswick.

Durante is most known for her contributions to the field of evolutionary psychology, particularly in the areas of consumer behavior, romantic relationships, parenting, and wellbeing. Her work combines biological knowledge with various fields of psychology and has been featured in media outlets, and in a TEDx talk. She is the author of the book, SIMPLE: Yesterday's Brain, Today's World, and the Forgotten Science of Living Well (Hachette Book Group)

== Education ==
Durante obtained a Bachelor of Science degree in Mass Communication from Boston University in 1995. She went on to pursue a Master of Arts degree in Social Psychology from the University of Chicago and completed it in 2004. In 2009, she obtained a PhD in Social Psychology from the University of Texas at Austin. She also completed a Post-doctoral Fellowship at the University of Minnesota, Carlson School of Management from 2009 to 2011.

== Career ==
Durante began her academic career in 2011 when she joined the Alvarez College of Business at the University of Texas, San Antonio as an assistant professor of marketing and served until 2015. In 2015, she joined Rutgers Business School, Newark, and New Brunswick, where she held multiple appointments including serving as an associate professor of marketing from 2015 to 2021. As of 2020, she is the vice chair of the Marketing Department while concurrently serving as professor of marketing at the Rutgers Business School – Newark and New Brunswick.

== Research ==
Durante's work combines insights from evolutionary mismatch theory to better understand and promote emotional wellness and stress management. She has authored numerous publications spanning the areas of business psychology, stress, hormones, close relationships, and consumer behavior.

=== Evolutionary mismatch ===
Durante's research is focused on understanding deficits to mental and physical wellbeing through the lens of evolutionary mismatch—the idea that the human brain is designed for and adapted to conditions of an ancestral environment that existed thousands of years ago, not the modern environment. She writes opinion articles on this topic for multiple outlets and publishes regularly on her Substack, Evolve SIMPLE.

=== Evolutionary relationship psychology ===
Durante's research in evolutionary psychology has contributed to the contemporary understanding of the adaptive functions and origins of various human behaviors, emotions, and cognitive processes. Her early research highlighted that the way humor is expressed, rather than simply the act of being humorous, has a considerable influence on the creation of romantic attraction in both genders. In related research, her work provided a framework called the conflict-confluence model which integrated two distinct perspectives on human mating i.e. the evolutionary psychology perspective and the relationship science perspective. She explored the paradoxical phenomenon where women in western dual-educated marriages initiate divorce more often than men and fare better psychologically after divorce despite facing greater financial and childcare burdens and proposed an evolutionary mismatch perspective to explain this phenomenon. The research suggested that modern marriage arrangements can conflict with women's evolved preferences, causing dissatisfaction, and that women's growing career opportunities enable them to leave unsatisfactory marriages, while social expectations for both genders can exacerbate these vulnerabilities.

=== Effect of fertility on women's life choices ===
Durante has conducted research on fertility, particularly its impact on a woman's life choices and decisions, ranging from career goals to relationship dynamics. While investigating the interplay between social behavior, fertility, and mate competition in women, her work presented evidence that a woman's fertility can have an impact on how women behave toward one another, particularly concerning competition for mates. She proposed that women who exhibit higher fertility levels may display more assertive and antagonistic behavior towards other women, perceiving them as prospective rivals for mates.

=== Consumer psychology ===
Focusing her research efforts on the fundamental insights of evolutionary theory and their application to the study of consumer behavior, her work brought attention to the misconceptions that often arise with an evolutionary approach to behavior and highlighted the application of specific evolutionarily-informed theories in four core areas of consumer research including self-control and temporal preferences, competition and luxury consumption, risk preference, and the consumer behavior of women and families. In further research, she explored the role of serendipity (or chance encounters) on consumer satisfaction. It was revealed in her research that, compared to a condition where consumers chose for themselves, enjoyment increased when consumers received a movie or song that appeared to have been delivered at random. Her research suggests that companies can capitalize on the power of serendipity by increasing the positive, unexpected, and chance nature of product encounters.

== Personal life ==
Durante was born in Milwaukee and grew up in Elkhorn, Wisconsin. She worked as a publicist in Los Angeles and New York before becoming an academic.

== Selected articles ==
- Roney, J. R., Hanson, K. N., Durante, K. M., & Maestripieri, D. (2006). Reading men's faces: Women's mate attractiveness judgments track men's testosterone and interest in infants. Proceedings of the Royal Society B: Biological Sciences, 273(1598), 2169–2175.
- Durante, K. M., Li, N. P., & Haselton, M. G. (2008). Changes in women's choice of dress across the ovulatory cycle: Naturalistic and laboratory task-based evidence. Personality and Social Psychology Bulletin, 34(11), 1451–1460.
- Li, N. P., Griskevicius, V., Durante, K. M., Jonason, P. K., Pasisz, D. J., & Aumer, K. (2009). An evolutionary perspective on humor: Sexual selection or interest indication?. Personality and Social Psychology Bulletin, 35(7), 923–936.
- Durante, K. M., Griskevicius, V., Hill, S. E., Perilloux, C., & Li, N. P. (2011). Ovulation, female competition, and product choice: Hormonal influences on consumer behavior. Journal of Consumer Research, 37(6), 921–934.
- Hill, S. E., Rodeheffer, C. D., Griskevicius, V., Durante, K., & White, A. E. (2012). Boosting beauty in an economic decline: mating, spending, and the lipstick effect. Journal of personality and social psychology, 103(2), 275.
- Chang, Y., & Durante, K. M. (2022). Why consumers have everything but happiness: An evolutionary mismatch perspective. Current Opinion in Psychology, 46, 1–6.
