= Josy Koelsch =

French canoeist

Auguste Joseph André "Josy" Koelsch (5 October 1926 – 30 August 1985) was a French sprint canoer who competed in the early 1950s. He finished 13th in the K-2 10000 m event at the 1952 Summer Olympics in Helsinki.
