= Silvestro Durante =

Italian church musician and composer

Silvestro Durante (died 1672) was an Italian church musician and composer.

Durante was a student of the composer Giacomo Carissimi. From 1645 to 1662, he was maestro di cappella of the Basilica of Santa Maria in Trastevere in Rome, although in December 1637, he was already referred to as the "maestro" of church music at the Basilica, and in 1664, he was still called maestro di capella.

Some of Durante's works are in the Düben collection in the Uppsala University Library.
