= Dontae Morris =

American criminal on death row

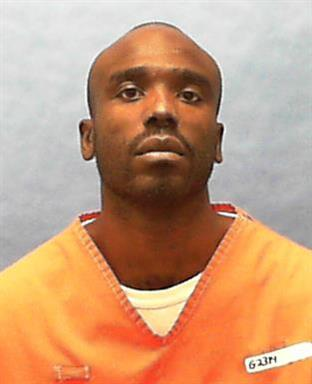
- Morris in 2014
- Born: Dontae Rashawn Morris; August 24, 1985 (age 41); Tampa, Florida, U.S.
- Convictions: First degree murder (4 counts); Attempted armed robbery Escape
- Penalty: Death

Details
- Victims: 5–7
- Span of crimes: May 18 – June 29, 2010
- Country: United States
- State: Florida
- Date apprehended: July 2, 2010
- Imprisoned at: Florida State Prison

Dontae Rashawn Morris (born August 24, 1985) is an American serial killer who shot and killed five people in Tampa between May and June 2010. He was initially sentenced to three death sentences in two cases (10-CF-10203A in 2014 & 10-CF-10373A in 2015). After a 2016 change in Florida law requiring a jury to recommend death unanimously, Morris appealed all of his death penalty verdicts. In case 2010-CF-10203A, the murder of Tampa Police officers David Curtis and Jeffrey Kocab, the jury had returned a unanimous verdict recommending death. As such, in 2021, the Florida Supreme Court affirmed his sentence of death in that case. In 2010-CF-10373, the murder of Derek Anderson, death was recommended by a majority, rather than unanimously. In 2021, Morris appealed and instead of retrying the case, State Attorney Andrew Warren elected to agree to re-sentencing Morris to life in prison on that case. Morris was also sentenced to life in prison for the murder of Rodney Jones.

== Biography ==
Dontae Morris was born in Tampa on August 24, 1985. His mother, who was 16 at the time of his birth, suffered from depression, and his father was murdered when he was two years old; the crime remains unsolved. Morris grew up partially with his sick grandmother and changed schools several times. He has two younger stepsiblings from his mother being in another relationship. Morris is said to be a member of the "Bloods" street gang according to prison records. He would become a father to a son who was 7 years old as of 2013.

His aunt, Carolyn Riggins, worked at the Tampa Police Department and was released in July 2010, as the authorities discovered that she withheld important information that could have led to Morris being arrested earlier.

His girlfriend, Cortnee Brantley, who had driven the car on the night of the June 29 murder, was sentenced to a one-year prison sentence for fleeing from a crime scene and concealing a dangerous weapon.

== Murders ==
Between May 18 and June 8, 2010, Morris shot and killed 21-year-old Derek Anderson, 42-year-old Rodney Jones and 25-year-old Harold Wright. According to the investigation, the reason was due to drug trades. The crime scenes were located in the Kenneth Court Apartments, the Cotton Club Bar and Palm River-Clair Mel, all located in Tampa.

On June 29, 2010, Morris shot and killed police officers Jeffrey Kocab and David Curtis as they attempted to arrest him in East Tampa. Morris was a passenger in his girlfriend's vehicle when they were stopped on the corner of Martin Luther King Jr. Blvd and 50th Street for missing license plates. As there was an arrest warrant for Morris from Jacksonville for check fraud, Curtis requested assistance from his partner Kocab. When they asked him to put his hands behind his back, Morris shot both officers in the head with a pistol and then fled on foot.

== Investigations and arrest ==
A witness alerted the police, who started a search for the culprit with a large contingent. The murders of the two officers had been recorded by the dashcam of David Curtis' patrol car, which helped identify Dontae Morris as the perpetrator. His girlfriend, who had fled the car and hid in an apartment, was also identified from the dashcam video. It was the most deadly day of the Tampa Police Department in over twelve years since May 19, 1998, when detectives Ricky Childers and Randy Bell were shot dead by Hank Earl Carr.

In the following days, the search for Morris became the biggest manhunt in Tampa's history. More than 1,000 officers and employees from 22 agencies were involved in the search, including FBI and ATF officials, SWAT teams, armored vehicles, dog teams and helicopters with thermal imagers. In addition, about 300 homes were searched and a media-assisted search was launched, with hundreds of wanted posters installed in Florida and two other states. The reward for clues leading to his arrest was increased to $101,000.

The authorities announced that Morris' criminal record was 14 pages long and he had twice been in jail. Offenses included disturbances on the street, car theft, drug possession, drug trafficking, violation of the weapons law, resistance to arrest, assault, violation of probation, attempted robbery and dangerous bodily harm. He was also charged with murder, but acquitted. At press conferences, the police also announced that Morris was suspected of two more murders of African-American residents of Tampa.

On July 2, Dontae Morris was arrested by law enforcement at a law firm in south Tampa and was taken to an isolated cell in the Orient Road Jail.

== Charges and convictions ==
His trial began in July 2012 for the murder of Rodney Jones, who was shot dead on May 31, 2010, after leaving the Cotton Club Bar on North Albany Avenue. Based on text messages and testimonies, Morris was convicted and sentenced in March 2013 for murder and attempted robbery to a life sentence without parole, plus an additional 25 years.

In November 2013, his trial began for the murder of the two police officers, Jeffrey Kocab and David Curtis. Since Morris had been filmed during the killings by the dashcam of Curtis' patrol car and his name and date of birth were picked up, the jury only needed four hours to convict him of double murder. Following the ruling, Morris was sentenced to death in May 2014 by a judge in Hillsborough County.

In June, a judge announced that he would begin a new trial for Morris for the murder of Derek Anderson on July 20. Anderson had been shot dead in front of his home on May 18, 2010, after he had previously had an argument with Morris on a basketball court. A ballistic expert and a police spokeswoman also announced that the same weapon had been used in the murder of Anderson as in the murder of the two police officers. In July 2015, he was convicted by a jury after three days of deliberation and again sentenced to death.

The authorities also announced that Morris was accused of the July 8, 2010, murder of Harold Wright, who was robbed next to his vehicle on 51st Street and killed with a headshot. At that time, Morris' fingerprints had been secured at the crime scene. An acquaintance of his told the authorities that Morris had planned to rob Wright. However, in December 2015, the prosecutor announced without further public statement that the state would not bring this last murder charge to court. Judge William Fuente then ordered Morris be transferred onto the death row of Florida State Prison.

In April 2017, his appeal against the death penalty in the case of the two police officers was rejected by the Florida Supreme Court. However, in January 2018, the Florida Supreme Court reversed the death penalty in the Derek Anderson case on the grounds that the jury's verdict was not unanimous.

As of May 2019, Morris was listed as one of Florida's 19 inmates condemned to death row for murders that took place within Hillsborough County.

== See also ==
- Capital punishment in Florida
- List of death row inmates in the United States § Florida
- List of serial killers in the United States
