= Lynching of George Ward =

Lynching of a black man in Indiana

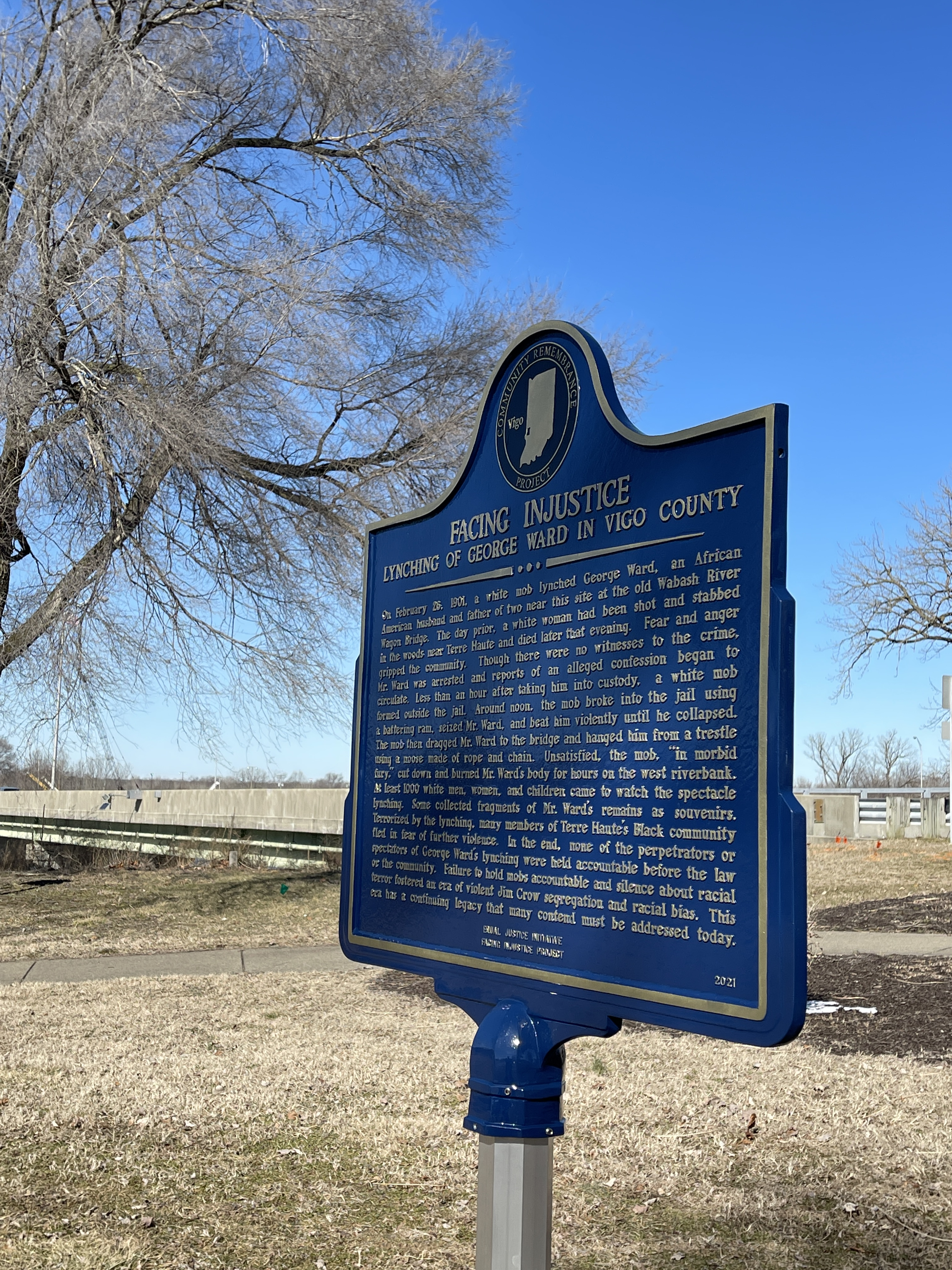
- Marker memorializing George Ward in Fairbanks Park in Terre Haute, Indiana, United States, commissioned by the Facing Injustice Project and the Equal Justice Initiative.
- Date: February 26, 1901
- Location: Terre Haute, Indiana
- Type: Lynching
- Motive: Ward was suspected of murdering a white woman
- Target: George Ward
- Participants: Certain residents of Vigo County, Indiana
- Inquiries: A grand jury was convened but no charges were returned

A mob of white Vigo County, Indiana, residents lynched George Ward, a black man, on February 26, 1901, in Terre Haute, Indiana, for the suspected murder of a white woman. An example of a spectacle lynching, the event was public in nature and drew a crowd of over 1,000 white participants. Ward was dragged from a jail cell in broad daylight, struck in the back of the head with a sledgehammer, hanged from a bridge, and burned. His toes and the hobnails from his boots were collected as souvenirs. A grand jury was convened but no one was ever charged with the murder of Ward. It is the only known lynching in Vigo County. The lynching was memorialized 120 years later with a historical marker and ceremony.

== Life ==
George Ward was born in Kentucky, raised by his grandmother in Circleville, Ohio, and moved to Terre Haute, Indiana around 1896. Ward worked at the Filbeck Hotel as a porter, as a coal miner in nearby Seeleyville, and at the Terre Haute Car and Manufacturing Company. According to newspaper reports at the time of his death, Ward was considered by co-workers to be a good worker. He had a previous conviction for burglary and was jailed for 30 days in 1899.

He married Ruth Roberts in 1897 or 1898 and had two children under the age of three in 1901. His wife was from Lost Creek Township in Vigo County, Indiana, which was a Freedmen's town. They lived at 1610 Spruce Street, Terre Haute.

== Lynching ==
George Ward was lynched on February 26, 1901. He had been arrested earlier that morning by Terre Haute police officers and taken to the county jail. Early in the afternoon that same day, a crowd of white people formed at the jail. The jailers feared that violence would break out and made arrangements for Ward to be transferred to Indianapolis. Before the transfer could be made, the mob used a 25-foot long piece of timber tipped with steel to break into the jail through a side door and pulled Ward from his cell. The jailer and three deputies resisted the crowd, were fired upon and the deputies were injured in the melee.

Outside the jail, the mob beat Ward violently and he was struck in the back of the head with a sledgehammer which was most likely what killed him. The white mob dragged Ward's body to a nearby drawbridge on the Wabash River, where they hanged him. The Fort Wayne Sentinel described that "the east bank of the river, the bridges up and down the stream, and hundreds of housetops were black with spectators from whom not a word of pity escaped." Later, the mob removed Ward from the bridge and burned his body on the banks of the river. Varying reports estimate that a crowd of at least a thousand people participated, including women and children. Chicago newspapers reported that after the white mob burned Ward's body, some participants cut off his toes and collected the unburned hobnails from his boots as souvenirs.

Ward was suspected of the murder of Ida Finkelstein, who had been attacked on February 25, 1901. Finkelstein, a young white woman and local teacher, was attacked and severely injured from a shotgun blast and pen knife wound. Before her death, she is reported to have described her attacker as "a colored man dressed in hunting clothes". Ward was known to be an avid squirrel hunter. He had purchased a shotgun for hunting in late 1900 and newspapers reported that he was seen in hunting clothes riding on the same streetcar that Finkelstein rode earlier that day. On the morning of February 26, 1901, Terre Haute police officers arrested Ward for her murder and asserted that a pen knife with a missing blade that matched the one that was left behind in the assault was in Ward's possession.

Ward allegedly confessed to the crime at the county jail. His case was never tried in court, and no one from the sizeable mob was ever charged with attacking the jail or the murder of Ward. A grand jury was convened on March 11 but no indictments were returned. Members of the local black community were terrorized by the lynching and fled fearing future violence against them.

In Indiana, between 1877 and 1950, there were at least eighteen black people lynched. The death of George Ward is the only known lynching in Vigo County.

== Memorialization ==
Nearly 120 years after the lynching of George Ward, the city of Terre Haute began memorialization efforts for Ward. In 2019, an organization called Facing Injustice formed as part of the Equal Justice Initiative’s Community Remembrance Project. Facing Injustice's goal is to assist the Terre Haute community in reckoning with past racial injustices and building towards a more equitable future. One of Facing Injustice's first initiatives was a soil collection ceremony on March 1, 2020. The soil was collected from the site of Ward's lynching and sent to the Equal Justice Initiative's Legacy Museum in Montgomery, Alabama.

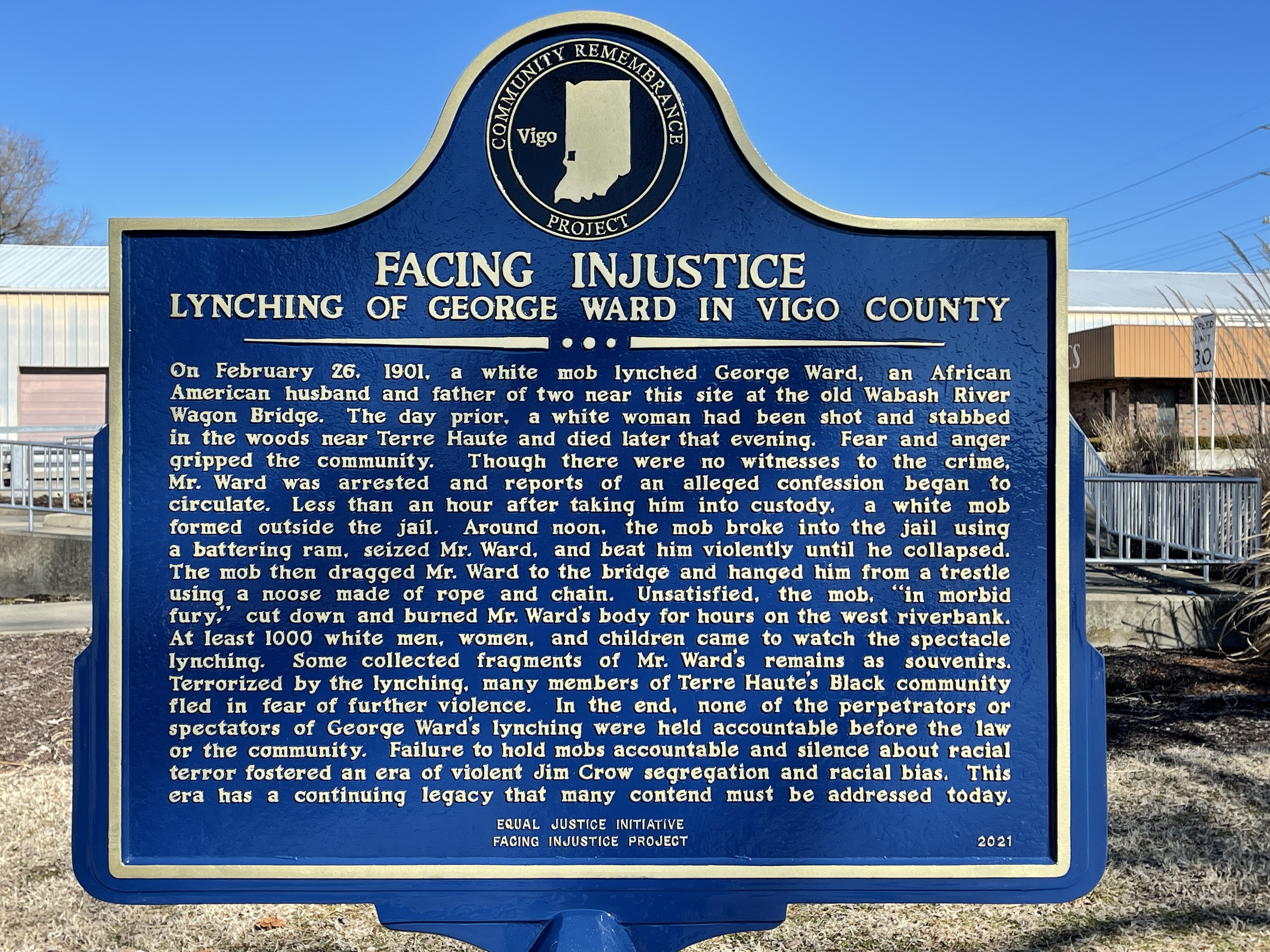
Straight on photo of the Equal Justice Initiative Marker commemorating the lynching of George Ward. While the bridge where the hanging took place no longer exists, the U.S. 150 bridge crosses nearby.

On April 21, 2021, the Indiana State Senate passed State Resolution 72 and presented it to Ward's family. The resolution memorialized George Ward for the 120th anniversary of his death. It acknowledged that Ward's family and his descendants "continue to be affected" by the event to this day. It recognized that although past injustices, such as Ward's murder, cannot be rectified, Indiana can recognize its history of lynching to begin healing and prevent injustices in the future.

Facing Injustice unveiled a historical marker dedicated to Ward and the legacy of lynching in Indiana during a ceremony on September 26, 2021. The marker is close to the site where the white mob lynched Ward in North Fairbanks Park. Four generations of Ward's descendants attended the unveiling ceremony, including his great-grandson, Terry Ward, who spoke at the event. Terry Ward explained that the ceremony helped lift shame off his family, whom Vigo County residents had labeled as criminals for generations after the lynching.
