= George Ward (canoeist) =

Canadian canoeist

George Ward (February 23, 1932 – October 23, 2008) was a Canadian sprint canoeist who competed in the early 1950s. At the 1952 Summer Olympics in Helsinki, he was eliminated in the heats of the K-2 1000 m event.
