= Raffaele Bastoni =

Italian canoeist

Raffaele Bastoni (15 May 1925 – 17 November 1992) was an Italian sprint canoer, born in Rome, who competed in the early 1950s. He finished 17th in the K-2 10000 m event at the 1952 Summer Olympics in Helsinki.
