= Dante Agostini (canoeist) =

Italian canoeist (born 1923)

Dante Orfeo Mosè Agostini (born 18 November 1923) is an Italian sprint canoeist who competed in the early 1950s. He finished 17th in the K-2 10000 m event at the 1952 Summer Olympics in Helsinki.

Agostini was sentenced in absentia to 22 years imprisonment for war crimes whilst he was in Finland.
