= George Ward (rugby league) =

Australian rugby league footballer

George 'Mick' Ward
- George 'Mick' Ward in 1930

Personal information
- Full name: George Daniel Ward
- Born: 4 August 1910 Rockdale, New South Wales, Australia
- Died: 20 December 1991 (aged 81) Blakehurst, New South Wales, Australia

Playing information
- Position: Centre
Club
| Years | Team | Pld | T | G | FG | P |
|---|---|---|---|---|---|---|
| 1929–31 | St. George | 29 | 5 | 0 | 0 | 18 |
| 1933–34 | St. George | 15 | 2 | 0 | 0 | 6 |
| | Total | 44 | 7 | 0 | 0 | 24 |

George Daniel 'Mick' Ward (1910–1991) was an Australian rugby league footballer who played in the 1920s and 1930s.

== Playing career ==
George Ward (known as Mick Ward) came to St. George via the Arncliffe junior league and was graded in 1928. He was also a noted local cricketer, playing for St. George Cricket Club for 25 years. After three seasons at Saints, 'Mick' Ward took up a captain/coach position at Queanbeyan, New South Wales for 1932, before returning to St. George for two more years. Ward lived at Arncliffe, New South Wales for many years before locating to Blakehurst, New South Wales after his 1937 wedding.

== Death ==
'Mick' Ward died on 20 December 1991 at Blakehurst, New South Wales age 81.
