= Annalisa Marzano =

Italian-American archaeologist and academic

Annalisa Marzano, FRHistS FSA, MAE (born 1969 in New York) is an Italian-American archaeologist and academic. She is Professor of Classical Archaeology at the University of Bologna and has been Professor of Ancient History at the University of Reading in England. She specializes in Roman social and economic history.

== Education ==
Marzano grew up in Positano and attended the Liceo Classico P. Virgilio Marone in Meta di Sorrento. She received her Bachelor's and master's degrees in Classics (Laurea in Lettere Classiche) in 1994 with honours (110/110 summa cum laude) from the University of Florence, where she continued her studies with a post-master diploma in ‘Science for the Conservation of Cultural Heritage’ (1996). She then undertook postgraduate research at Columbia University under the supervision of William V. Harris, receiving her Master of Philosophy (MPhil) degree in 1999, and completing her Doctor of Philosophy (PhD) degree in 2004, with distinction. Her doctoral thesis was titled ‘Villas and Roman Society in Central Italy: From the Late Republic to the Middle Empire’.

== Academic career ==
Marzano began her academic career in the UK as research assistant to Prof. Andrew Wilson at the Institute of Archaeology, University of Oxford (2004–2007) and was a member of the research team for the Oxford Roman Economy Project (2005–2008). She was appointed as Lecturer in Classics in 2008 and, subsequently, promoted to Reader in 2011 in the Department of Classics at the University of Reading; in 2013 she was appointed Professor of Ancient History. She has been Head of Department (2013–2016) and Director of the Centre for Economic History (2013–2016).

She has held various fellowships, both in the US and the UK. While at Columbia University she was awarded a Whiting Foundation Dissertation Fellowship (2002–2003). Once at Oxford, she was appointed W. Golding Jr. Research Fellow at Brasenose College (2005–2008). In 2010 she was visiting research scholar at the Institute for the Study of the Ancient World, and was nominated Hugh Last Fellow at the British School at Rome in autumn 2016. In 2016 she has also been awarded a Leverhulme Major Research Fellowship for the period 2017–2019. At Reading, she has been Member of the University Senate. She is a trustee of the Herculaneum Society, and was a member of council and trustee for The Society for the Promotion of Roman Studies.

== Honours ==
Marzano became a Fellow of the Higher Education Academy in January 2011, and was recognized as Senior Fellow in 2016. She was elected as Fellow of the Royal Historical Society (12/2011) and as Fellow of the Society of Antiquaries of London (10/2013). In 2020 she has been elected a Member of the Academia Europaea in the section Classics and Oriental Studies

== Selected bibliography ==
=== Books ===
- Marzano, Annalisa (2022). Plants, Politics and Empire in Ancient Rome. Cambridge: Cambridge University Press (ISBN 978-1-009-10066-3).
- A. Marzano (ed.) (2021). Villas, Peasant Agriculture, and the Roman Rural Economy. Proceedings of the 19th International Congress of Classical Archaeology Cologne/Bonn, 22 – 26 May 2018: Archaeology and Economy in the Ancient World. Heidelberg: Propylaeum.
- Marzano, Annalisa and Guy P.R. Métraux (eds)(2018). The Roman Villa in the Mediterranean Basin: Late Republic to Late Antiquity. Cambridge: CUP. (ISBN 9781107164314)
- Marzano, Annalisa (2013). Harvesting the Sea: The Exploitation of Marine Resources in the Roman Mediterranean. (Oxford Studies on the Roman Economy). Oxford: OUP. ISBN 9780199675623.
- Marzano, Annalisa (2007). Roman Villas in Central Italy. A Social and Economic History. (Columbia Studies in the Classical Tradition, Vol. 30), Leiden & Boston: Brill. ISBN 9789004160378.

=== Articles and book chapters ===
- Marzano, Annalisa (2021). ‘Maritime Villas and Seasonality’, in R. Raja and A. Lichtenberger (eds), The Archaeology of Seasonality (Studies in Classical Archaeology 11). Turnhout, 263–278.
- Marzano, Annalisa (2021). ‘Capital Accumulation and Production: A View from the Roman World’, in M. Kelly and P. Pacha (eds), Capitalism’s Past. An Inquiry into the Possibility of Pre-Modern Capitalism. (Open Access, https://capitalismspast.org/symposium-1/).
- Marzano, Annalisa (2021). ‘Fishing and the Development of Human Societies’, Argos – Journal of the Maritime Museum of Ílhavo 8, 6–8.
- C. Barrett, K. Gleason, and A. Marzano, ‘The Casa della Regina Carolina (CRC) Project, Pompeii: Preliminary Report on 2018 and 2019 Field Seasons’, Fasti Online-Documents & Research 2020, 492 (Open Access, digital publication: http://www.fastionline.org/docs/FOLDER-it-2020-492.pdf).
- Marzano, Annalisa (2020). ‘Caesar’s triumphal banquet of 46 BC: A Hypothesis on its Political Significance on the Basis of a Recent Epigraphic Discovery from Pompeii’, Politica antica 10: 99–107.
- Marzano, Annalisa (2020).‘Agriculture in Imperial Italy’, in D. Hollander and T. Howe (eds), A Companion to Ancient Agriculture (Blackwell's Companions to the Ancient World). Hoboken, 431–446.
- Marzano, Annalisa (2020). ‘A story of land and water: Capital and investment in large-scale fishing and fish-salting operations’, in P. Erdkamp and K. Verboven (eds), Capital, Investment, and Innovation in the Roman World. Oxford, 275–306.
- Marzano, Annalisa (2019). ‘Food, Popinae, and the Emperor: Some Considerations on the Early-Imperial Policies on the Sale of Food’, in G.A. Cecconi, R. Lizzi Testa, A. Marcone (eds), The Past as Present. Essays on Roman History in Honour of Guido Clemente (Studi e Testi tardoantichi 17). Turnhout: Brepols, 435–458.
- Marzano, Annalisa (2018). ‘Large-scale fishing and the Roman production and trade in salted fish: some organizational aspects’, in B. Woytek (ed.) Infrastructure and Distribution in Ancient Economies: Proceedings of a conference held at the Austrian Academy of Sciences, 28–31 October 2014. Vienna: Österreichischen Akademie der Wissenschaften, 393–407.
- Marzano, Annalisa (2018). ‘Fish and Seafood’, in P. Erdkamp and C. Holleran (eds), The Routledge Handbook of Diet and Nutrition in the Roman World. London and New York: Routledge, 163–173.
- Marzano, Annalisa (2018). ‘Maritime villas and the resources of the sea’, in A. Marzano & G. Metraux (eds), The Roman Villa in the Mediterranean Basin: From the Late Republic Through Late Antiquity. Cambridge, 125–140.
- Marzano, Annalisa and G. P.R. Métraux (2018). ‘Introduction’, in A. Marzano & G. Metraux (eds), The Roman Villa in the Mediterranean Basin: From the Late Republic Through Late Antiquity. Cambridge, xxviii-xxxvi.
- Marzano, Annalisa and G. P.R. Métraux (2018). ‘The Roman villa in the Mediterranean: an overview’, in A. Marzano & G. Metraux (eds), The Roman Villa in the Mediterranean Basin: From the Late Republic Through Late Antiquity. Cambridge, 1-41.
- Marzano, Annalisa and G. P.R. Métraux (2018). ‘Conclusions’, in A. Marzano & G. Metraux (eds), The Roman Villa in the Mediterranean Basin: From the Late Republic Through Late Antiquity. Cambridge, 485–489.
- Marzano, Annalisa (2018). ‘Fish and Fishing in the Roman World’, Journal of Maritime Archaeology 13, 2018: 437–447. doi:10.1007/s11457-018-9195-1
- Marzano, Annalisa (2018). ‘Cicero, Paradoxa Stoicorum ad M. Brutum 38: an allusion to a new slave specialization?’, Latomus: revue d’études latines 77.1: 161–176.
- Marzano, Annalisa (2017). ‘Classical Archaeology and the Ancient Economy’, in A. Lichtenberger and R. Raja (eds), The Diversity of Classical Archaeology. Turnhout, 101–14.
- Marzano, Annalisa (2016). ‘Sergio Orata e il Lago Lucrino: alcune considerazioni sull’allevamento di ostriche nella Campania romana’, Oebalus. Studi sulla Campania nell’antichità 10 (2015): 131–150.
- Marzano, Annalisa (2015). ‘Villas as Instigators and Indicators of Economic Growth’. In P. Erdkamp and K. Verboven (eds.), Structure and Performance in the Roman Economy. Models, Methods and Case Studies. Brussels: Latomus, 197–221.
- Marzano, Annalisa (2015). ‘Reshaping the Past, Shaping the Present: Andrea De Jorio and Naples’ Classical Heritage’. In C. Buongiovanni & J. Hughes (eds.) Remembering Parthenope: The Reception of Classical Naples from Antiquity to the Present. (Classical Presences). Oxford: OUP, 266–283.
- Marzano, Annalisa (2014). ‘Roman gardens, military conquests, and elite self-representation’. In K. Coleman (ed.), Le jardin dans l’Antiquité. (Entretiens sur l’Antiquité classique 60). Genève: Fondation Hardt, 195–244.
- Marzano, Annalisa (2013). ‘Agricultural Production in the Hinterland of Rome: Wine and Olive Oil’. In A. Bowman and A. Wilson (eds.), The Roman Agricultural Economy. Organization, Investment, and Production. (Oxford Studies on the Roman Economy). Oxford: OUP, 85–106.
- Marzano, Annalisa (2011). ‘Rank-size Analysis and the Roman Cities of the Iberian Peninsula and Britain: Some considerations’. In A. Bowman & A. Wilson (eds.), Settlement, Urbanization, and Population. (Oxford Studies on the Roman Economy). Oxford: OUP, 196–228.
- Marzano, Annalisa (2012). ‘Snails, Wine and Winter Navigation’. In W. V. Harris & K. Iara (eds.). Maritime Technology in the Ancient Economy: Ship-design and navigation. (JRA Supplements 84). Portsmouth, Rhode Island: 179–187.
- Marzano, Annalisa (2009). ‘Trajanic Building Projects on Base-Metal Denominations and Audience Targeting’, Papers of the British School at Rome 77: 125–158.
- Marzano, Annalisa, and Giulio, Brizzi (2009). ‘Costly Display or Economic Investment? A Quantitative Approach to the Study of Roman Marine Aquaculture’, Journal of Roman Archaeology 22: 215–230.
- Marzano, Annalisa (2009). ‘Hercules and the Triumphal Feast for the Roman People’, in I. B. Antela-Bernárdez and T. Ñaco del Hoyo (eds.), Transforming Historical Landscapes in the Ancient Empires. (British Archaeological Reports International Series 1986). Oxford: John and Erica Hedges: 83–97.
