= Giorgio Duranti =

Italian painter

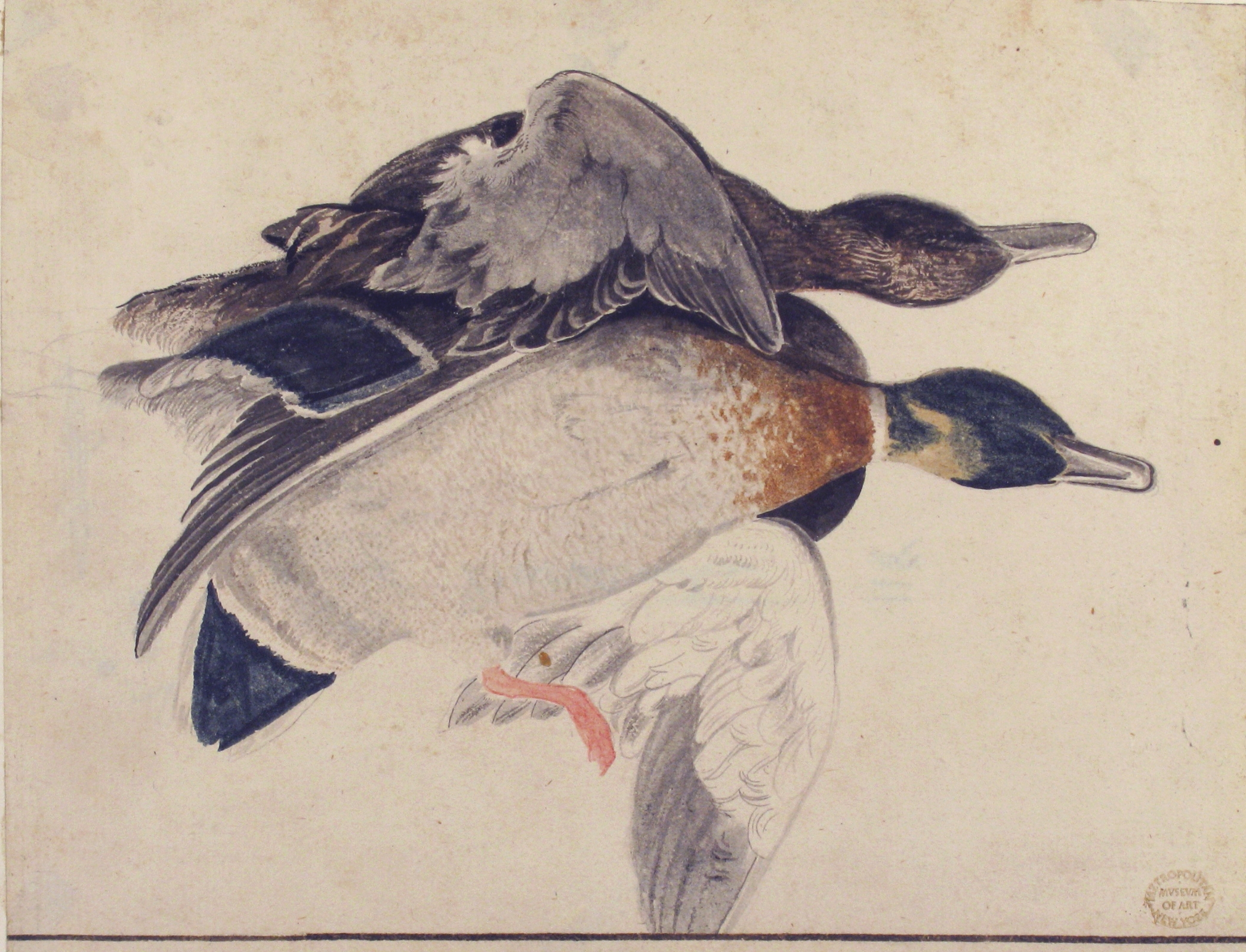
Drawing depicting Two Dead Ducks from Metropolitan Museum of Art, New York

Giorgio Duranti (1683 – 5 November 1768) was an Italian painter and cleric of the Baroque period, mainly active in Brescia, where he was born. An entry in Dandolo's study of the late Venetian Republic states 1755 as the year of death, and that many of his works were in the Royal Gallery of Turin, which was the nucleus of the Sabauda Gallery.

Duranti was also an abbot, count and knight. He studied sciences and music; he was known as an excellent player of the violoncello. He specialized in still life paintings of flowers. Many of those, he donated to the church of Palazzolo sull'Oglio who sold to the royal court of Spain. His brother Faustino (1606–1766), who became abbot after his brother's death, was also a painter specializing mainly in miniature portraits.
