= Annalisa Durante =

Murdered Italian child

Annalisa Durante

Annalisa Durante (Italian pronunciation: [annaˈliːza duˈrante]; February 19, 1990 – March 27, 2004) was a 14-year-old Italian girl and a victim of the Camorra, the Neapolitan Mafia. She was killed in the Forcella quarter of Naples, during a clash between two rival Camorra clans. While chatting with a friend and cousin outside her home, she was shot in the back of the head by Salvatore Giuliano, who was engaged in a shooting by the Bove-Mazzarella clan. She died after being in a coma for several days.

The local priest accused the state of leaving the neighbourhood to the mercy of the Camorra. A message on a bouquet of flowers left on the street where Annalisa was shot appeared to speak for many in the neighbourhood: "Free us from these monsters, Goodbye Annalisa." Thousands turned out for the emotionally charged funeral. Many mourners were in tears as they packed a parish church to pay tribute to Annalisa.

Salvatore Giuliano, a member of the Giuliano clan who once controlled the Forcella neighbourhood, was arrested on March 30, 2004. In March 2006, he received a 24-year jail sentence for the killing.

== Diary ==
In 2005, her diary was published in Italian:

- Andolfo, Matilde (2005). Il diario di Annalisa, Naples: Tullio Pironti ISBN 88-7937-358-7

== See also ==
- Gomorrah, book about the Camorra
