= Cees Koch (canoeist) =

Dutch canoeist (1925–2024)

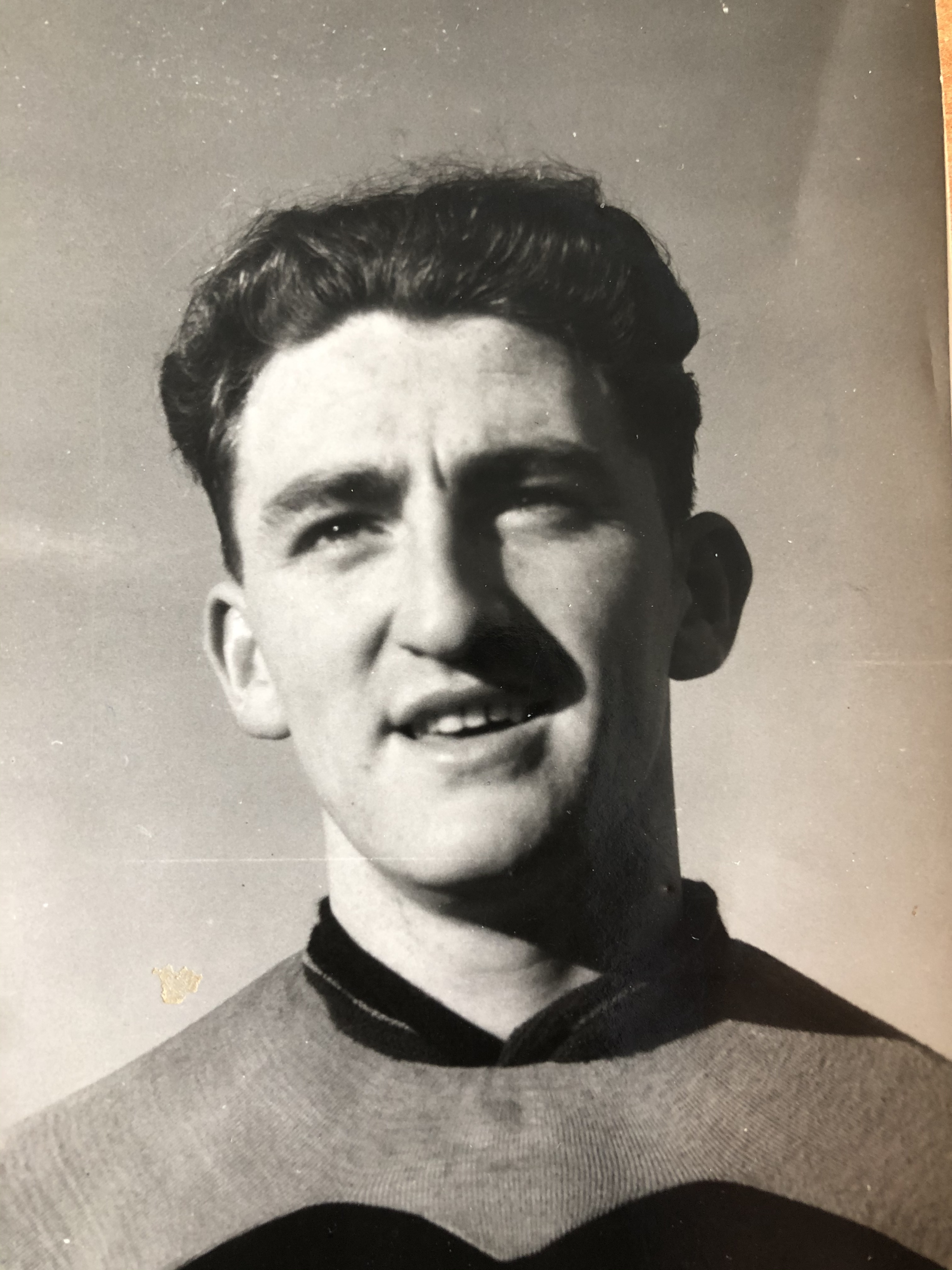
Koch in 1952

Cornelis "Cees" Koch (30 December 1925 – 13 February 2024) was a Dutch sprint canoeist who competed from the late 1940s to the late 1950s. Competing in two Summer Olympics, he earned his best finish of sixth in the K-2 10000 m event at London in 1948. Koch was born in Zaandam. He died in Alkmaar on 13 February 2024, at the age of 98.

== Sources ==
- Evans, Hilary; Gjerde, Arild; Heijmans, Jeroen; Mallon, Bill; et al. "Cees Koch". Olympics at Sports-Reference.com. Sports Reference LLC. Archived from the original on 18 April 2020.
- "Cees Koch". Olympischsporterfgoed.nl. Dutch Olympic Committee.
- "Cees Koch". Olympedia.
