= Alain Duschène =

Luxembourg Army general (born 1960)

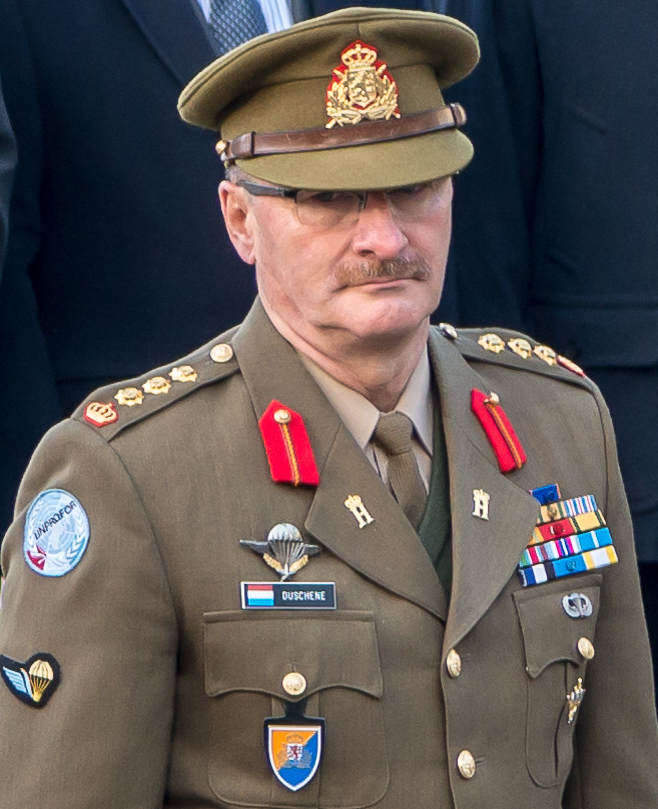
- Alain Duschène in 2016
- Born: 19 March 1960 (age 66); Esch-sur-Alzette
- Children: 2 daughters
- Military career
- Rank: General

Alain Duschène (born 19 March 1960) is a former Luxembourg Army general. On the 30 September 2017, he became Luxembourg's Chief of Defence, the professional head of the country's military, replacing former defence chief General Romain Mancinelli. He was succeeded by Steve Thull in 2020.

He graduated in 1984 from the École Royale Militaire (ERM) in Brussels.

== Decorations and awards ==
- Officier avec Couronne, Order of Adolphe of Nassau
- Commander, Order of the Oak Crown
- Commander, Order of Merit of the Grand Duchy of Luxembourg
- Croix d’Honneur et de Mérite militaire en Bronze
- 25 Years Service Cross
- Prince Jean de Luxembourg Commemorative Medal
- Medal for Sports Merit en vermeil
