= Nico Ries =

Luxembourgish soldier and former Chief of Defence of the Luxembourg Army

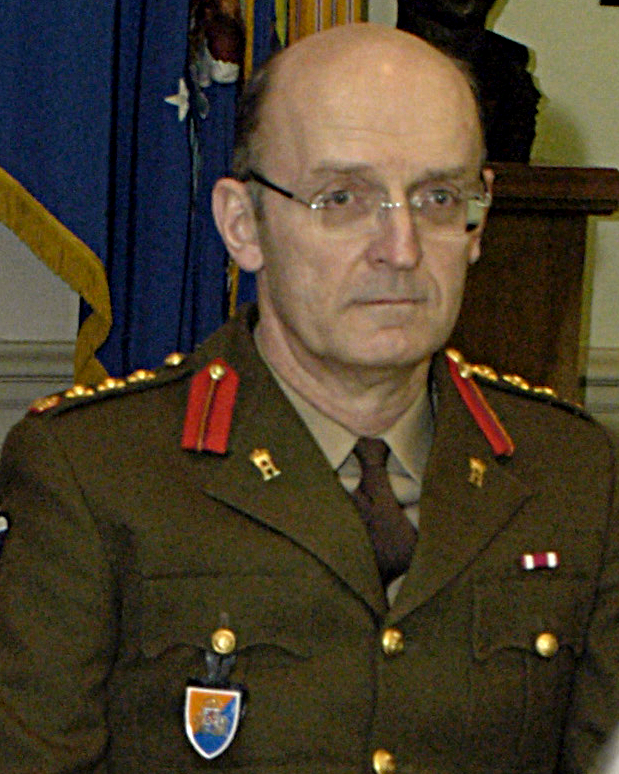
Nico Ries

Colonel Nico Ries (born 30 July 1953 in Luxembourg City) is a Luxembourgish soldier and former Chief of Defence of the Luxembourg Army. He served as Chief of Defence from 2002 to 2008, having previously been Assistant Chief of Defence.

In 2008, he was transferred by the Minister for Defence, Jean-Louis Schiltz, to the Ministry of the Interior, and was replaced as Chief of Defence by Gaston Reinig. He has challenged the constitutionality of this act, and sought the return of his job as Chief of Defence. In October 2010, the Administrative Court ruled that moving Ries amounted to a breach of Article 10 of the Constitution, which guarantees equality before the law. In January 2011, both Ries and Reinig were placed on leave, with Alain Duschene taking over the title of Chief of Defence in the interim.

== Footnotes ==
Military offices
Preceded by Pierre Freichel	Assistant Chief of Defence; 1998–2002	Succeeded by Fernand Guth
Preceded by Guy Lenz	Chief of Defence; 2002–2008	Succeeded by Gaston Reinig
