= Gaston Reinig =

Former Luxembourgish Chief of Defence

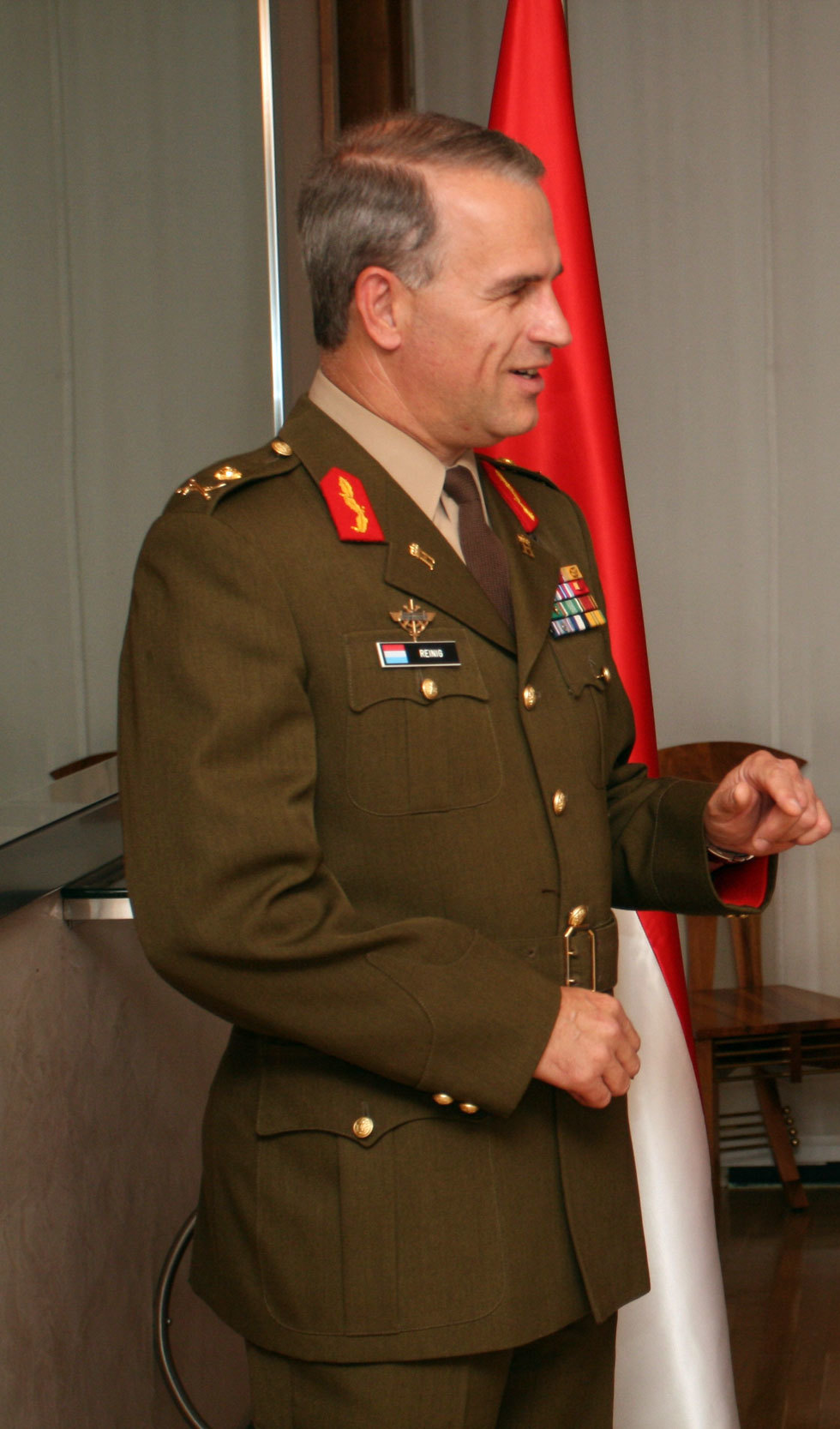
Gaston Reinig

General Gaston Reinig (born 17 November 1956 in Diekirch) is a Luxembourgish soldier and a former Chief of Defence of the Luxembourg Army. He replaced Nico Ries in 2008, having previously been Commander of the Military Training Centre in his hometown of Diekirch. He was promoted to general in March 2008, and was the first Chief of Defence to hold the rank.

Military offices
Preceded by Fernand Guth	Commander of the Military Training Centre; 2002–2008	Succeeded by Romain Mancinelli
Preceded by Nico Ries	Chief of Defence; 2008 – 2013	Succeeded by Mario Daubenfeld
