= Reinig =

Reinig is a place name for a former community that has been subsumed into Wasserliesch, Germany.

Reinig is a surname. Notable people with the surname include:

- Christa Reinig (1926–2008), German poet, fiction, and non-fiction writer and dramatist
- Gaston Reinig (born 1956), Luxembourgian soldier
