= Jean Ellis =

American physician (1946–2006)

Jean Ellis

Jean Ellis (November 23, 1946 – May 15, 2006) was an emergency department physician who practiced the latter part of his career at St. Vincent Healthcare located in Billings, Montana, and was nationally known for his accomplishments as a climber.

== Background ==
Jean Eliis was born in Esch, Luxembourg to Afro-American father and Italian mother. He earned his medical degree from the University of Cincinnati in 1976 and had his family practice residency completed at the UC Irvine Medical Center. Ellis worked in several emergency departments in California before moving to Billings in 1992 to work at Deaconess Billings Clinic. He joined the staff at St. Vincent Healthcare in September 1994.

Ellis made two attempts to climb Mount Everest, the world's highest mountain. In 1988, he was part of the expedition that was successful in putting the first two American women on the summit. Ellis, who also had been a long-distance runner who had previously qualified as an Olympic distance runner before he became a climber, was drawn to climbing in 1981 after seeing Mount Everest while at a seminar on Third World medicine in Nepal. Ellis qualified for the U.S. Olympic Trials as a marathon runner in 1980, the year the United States boycotted the Summer Games in Moscow. In 1996, Ellis became the first African-American to summit an 8,000 meter peak.

== Death ==
Ellis died on May 15, 2006, while cycling along Old Hardin Road at Dickie Road in Lockwood, Montana.
