= Steve Thull =

Luxembourgish military officer

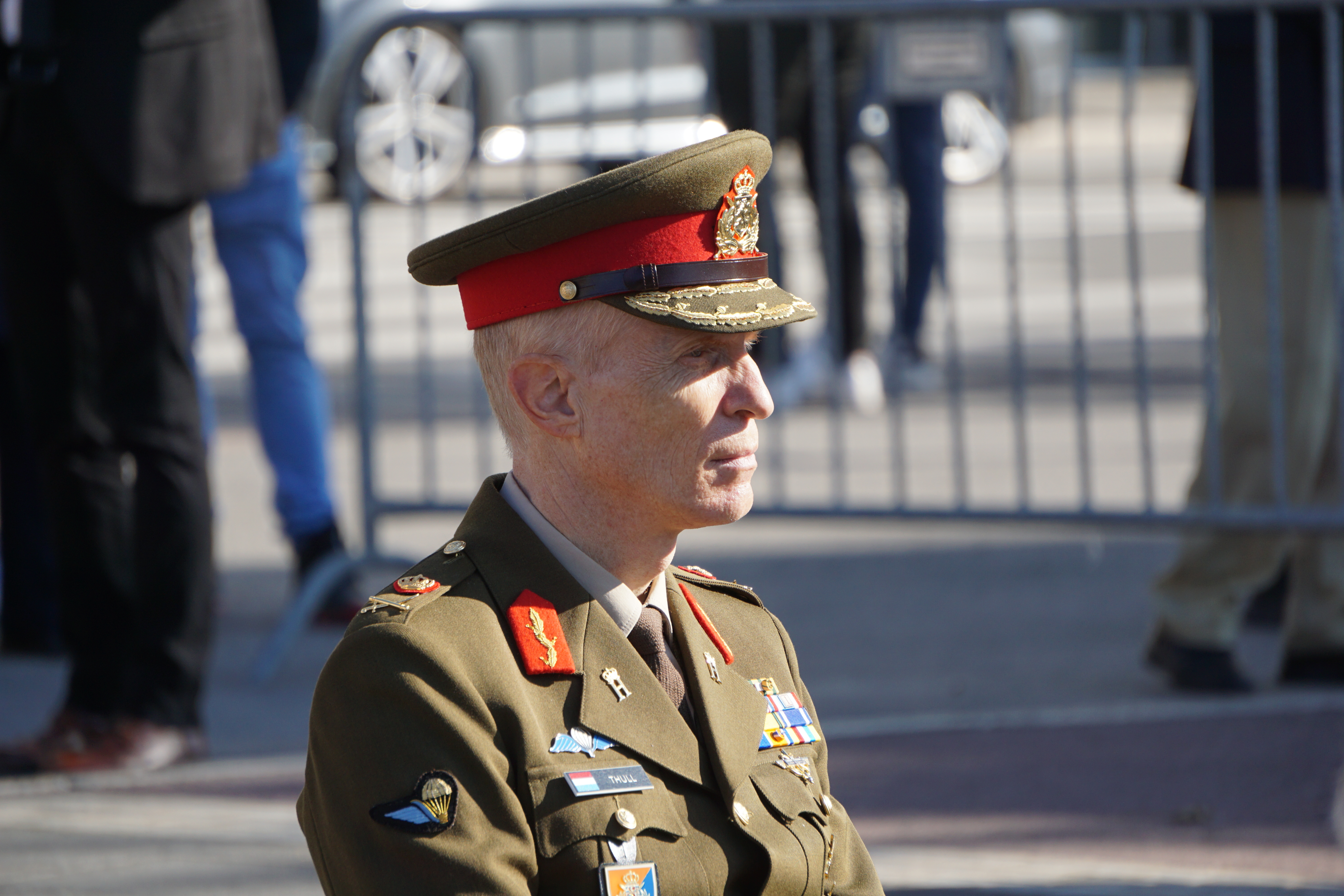
- Born: 23 April 1967 (age 59); Esch-sur-Alzette, Luxembourg
- Military career
- Allegiance: Luxembourg
- Service years: 1985–2026
- Rank: General

Steve Thull (born 23 April 1967) is a Luxembourg Army general who served as Luxembourg's Chief of Defence, the professional head of the country's military, from 2020 to 2026.

== Career ==
Thull succeeded General Alain Duschène as Chief of Defence on 29 September 2020. He was trained as an officer candidate at the Royal Military Academy in Brussels from 1987 to 1991. After completion of training he joined as lieutenant at Luxembourg Army on 1 October 1991. Later, he participated in NATO's Operation IFOR in Bosnia and Herzegovina in 1997 and Operation EUFOR in Chad and the Central African Republic in 2008. During his army career, he served as Personnel officer and Deputy Commander at the Military Center. He also served as a mortar platoon leader, anti-tank platoon leader, and scout platoon leader in his early armed forces career. On 29 September 2020 he became Chief of Defense and was promoted to the rank of General.

Thull was replaced as Chief of Defence in September 2026 by Claude Robinet.
