= Lankelz Railway =

Miniature railway in Luxembourg

Coordinates: 49°30′37″N 06°58′45″E

The Lankelz Railway in Esch-sur-Alzette, south-eastern Luxembourg, is a miniature railway on a scale of one third normal size (7 1/4 in (184 mm) gauge). The railway operates on Sunday afternoons and public holidays from May to mid-October.

Constructed in 1997, the narrow-gauge tracks, complete with bridges, tunnels and a station, are arranged in two sections; one is 1,000 metres long, the other 350 metres. There is one steam locomotive, two diesel engines and a tram. Trips can be made by steam train or diesel train.
