= Karin Monschauer =

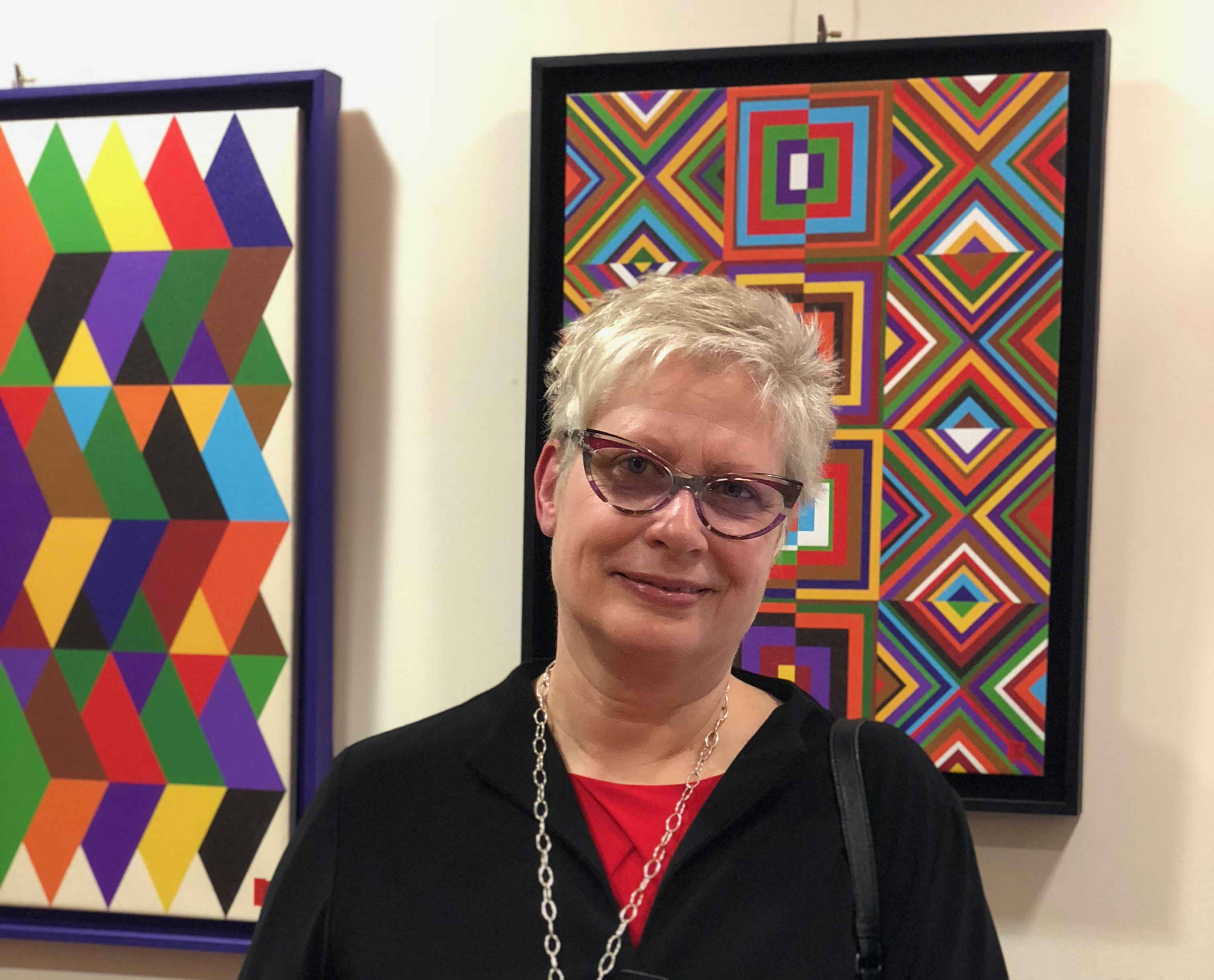
Karin Monschauer (2018)

Karin Monschauer (born 1960) is a Luxembourgish embroiderer who embarked on her artistic career in the 1980s. Since 2010, she has used computer graphics software to create digital art works presenting interwoven geometrical patterns of colours and shapes. In June 2022, in collaboration with Roma Tre University, her work was exhibited at Rome's Galleria Accademica d’Arte Contemporanea. Four of her works are in the permanent collection of the Bois du Cartier Museum in Charleroi, Belgium. As of March 2023, Monschauer lives in Muralto, Swirzerland.

== Early life ==
Born in Esch-sur-Alzette, Luxembourg, on 2 September 1960, Karin Monschauer graduated from high school specializing in mathematics. Although she began to embroider while still young, she is a self-taught artist.

== Career ==
In 1988, Monschauer began to embroider brightly coloured geometrical works in half cross-stitch. By 2010, she was experimenting with computerized art design programs. In December 2017, after spending 35 years in Italy, she was able to present a large selection of her digital art work in the premises of her former high school in Esch-sur-Alette. Her move to computerized support had not been easy and had proved much more time-consuming than might have been imagined. After first designing pullovers, she turned to geometrical representations. One advantage of working with fully digitized art was that it could be transported far more easily. Several of the works she exhibited created a three-dimensional effect, inspired perhaps by her interest in the Dutch artist M. C. Escher, though quite different.

Drawing on her experience of the Arabic art of raqm weaving, she was able to create ornamental designs with threads of different colours. Her works are then printed on canvas, inducing the perception of movement and continuity. By 2019, Monschauer had advanced with her digital work and was able to present 18 new works at the Swiss Art Expo in Zürich. Works such as Kreisel and Fissazione displayed impressive contrasts in colour and form thanks to the exceptionally high quality of the prints. In June 2022, in collaboration with Roma Tre University, her work was exhibited at Rome's Galleria Accademica d’Arte Contemporanea.
