= Esch-sur-Alzette =

Esch-sur-Alzette Esch-Uelzecht (Luxembourgish) Esch an der Alzette (German)
- City and commune
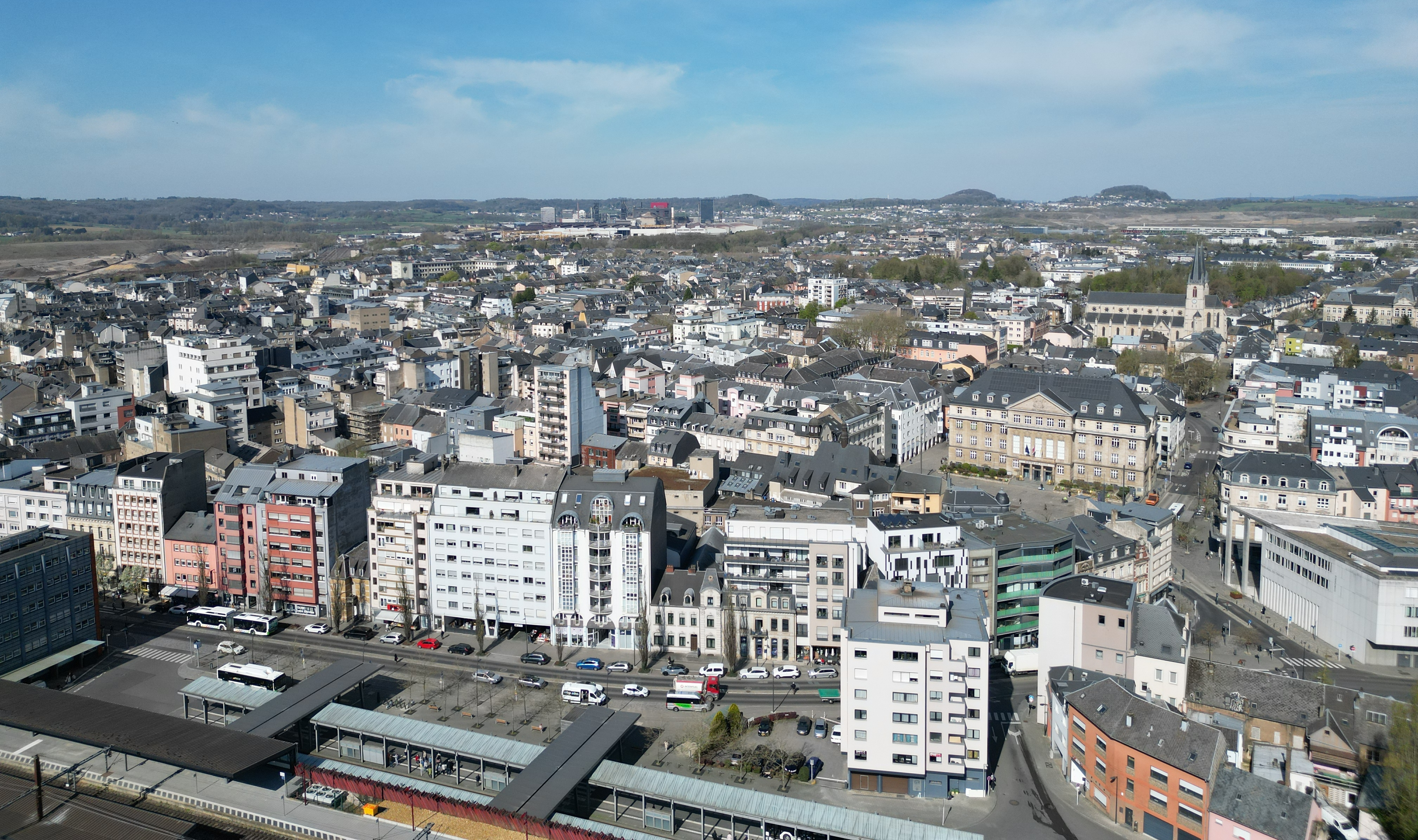
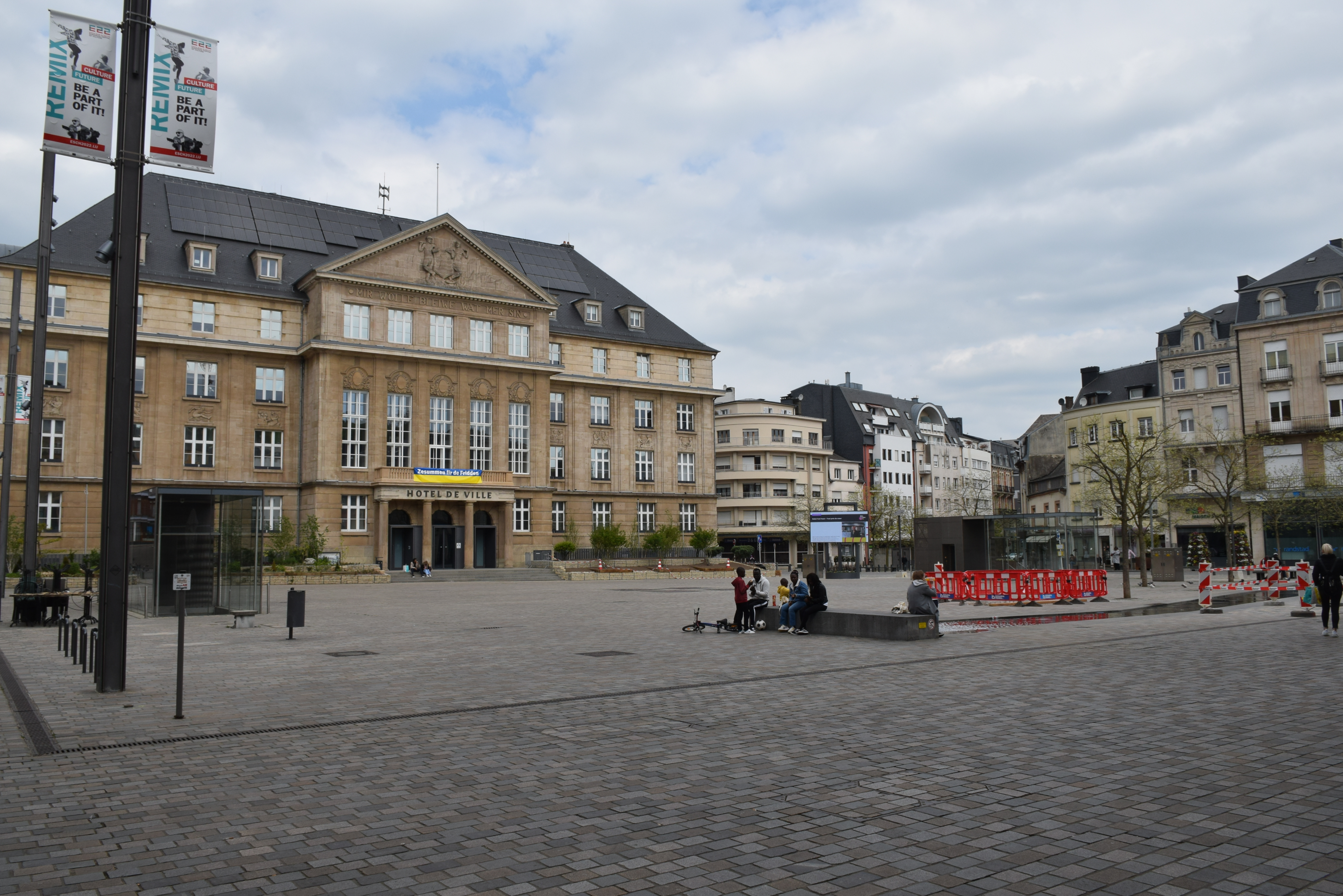
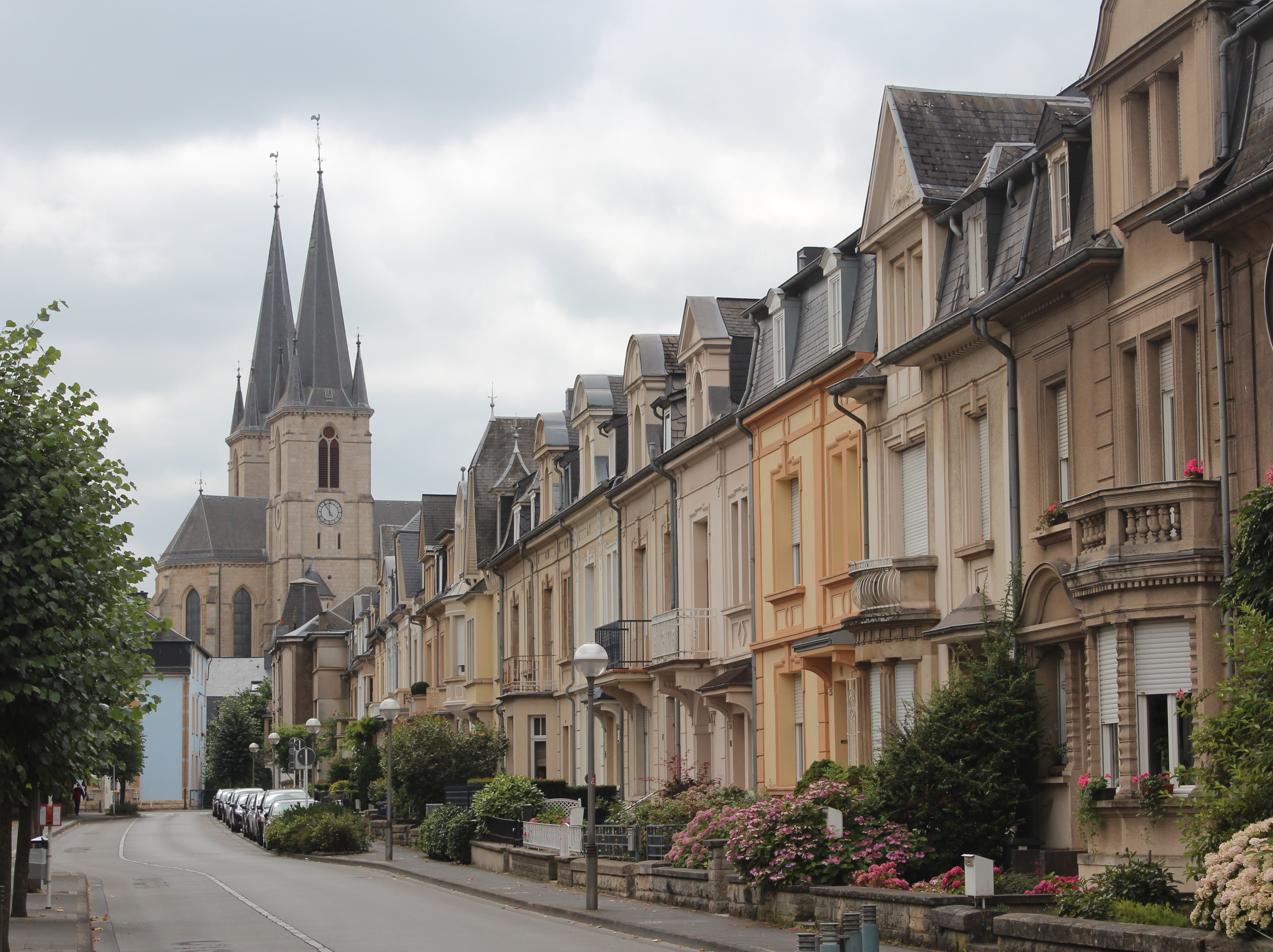
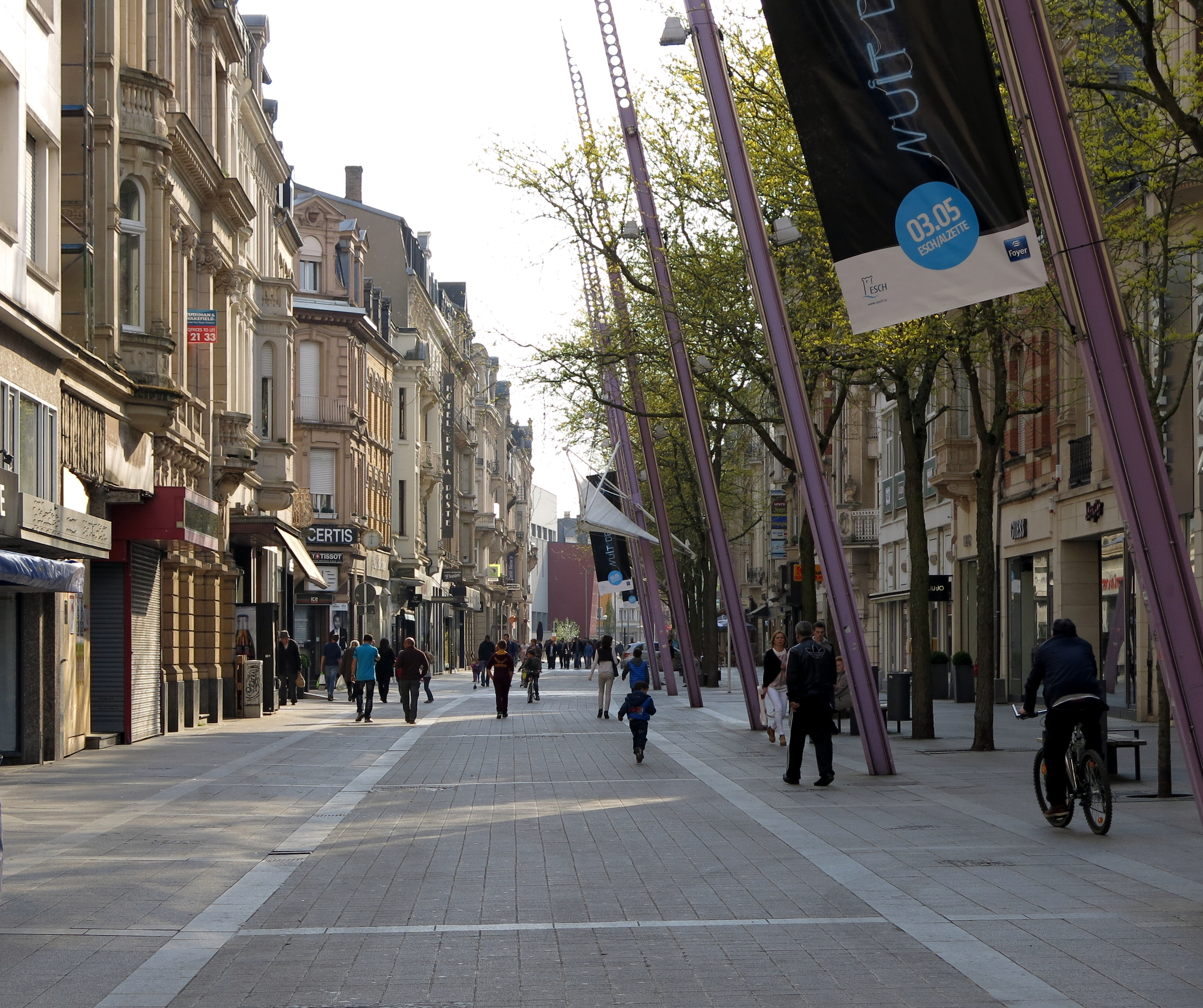
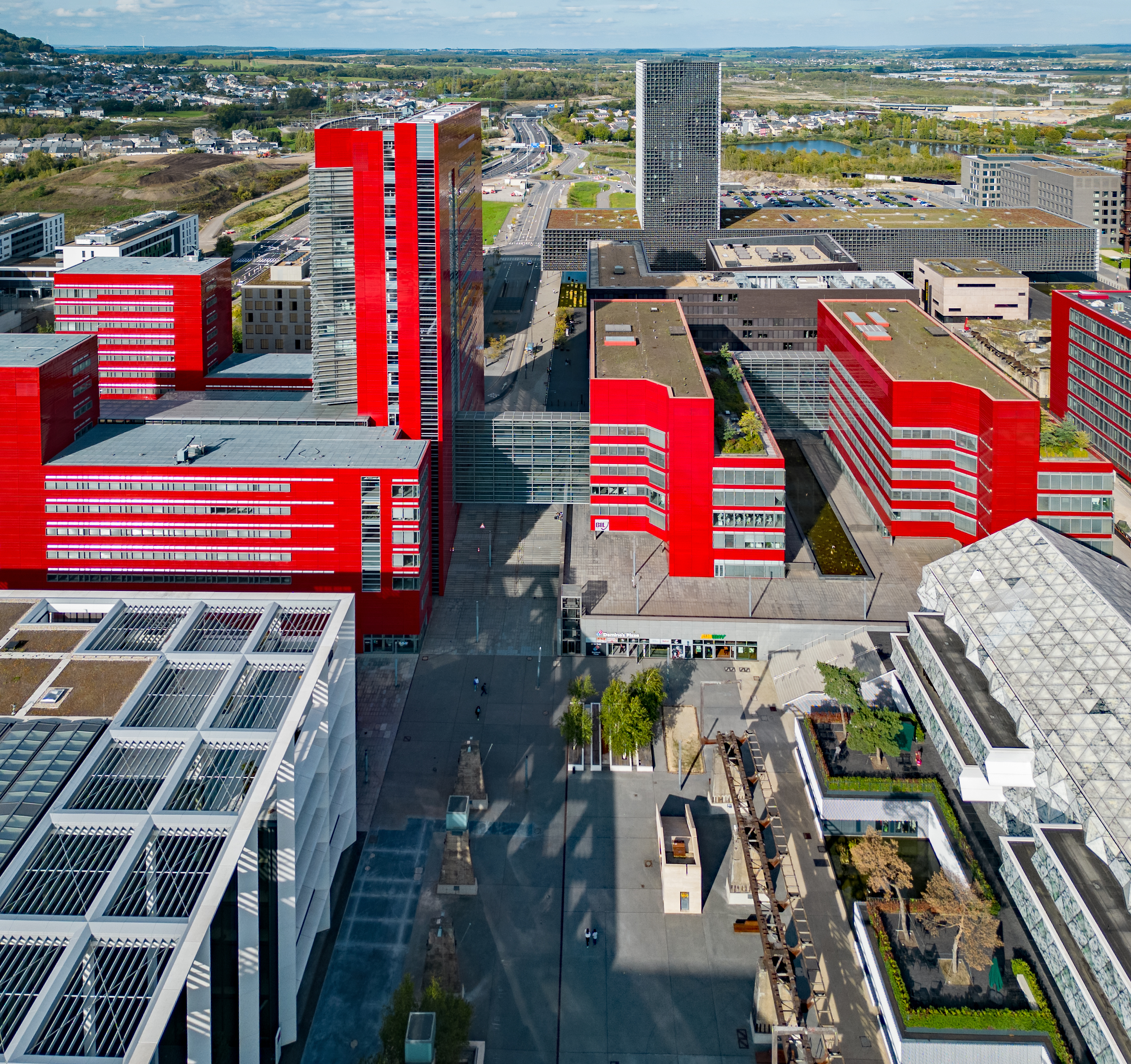
- Esch-sur-Alzette seen from the south-east (2025) City Hall Rue de l'Hôpital and St Joseph's Church Rue de l'Alzette Belval Campus

- Coat of arms Logo

- Map of Luxembourg with Esch-sur-Alzette highlighted in orange and the canton in dark red
- Interactive map of Esch-sur-Alzette
- Coordinates: 49.4969°N 5.9806°E
- Country: Luxembourg
- Canton: Esch-sur-Alzette

Government
  - Mayor: Christian Weis (CSV)

Area
  - Total: 14.35 km^{2} (5.54 sq mi)
  - Rank: 81st of 100
- Highest elevation: 426 m (1,398 ft)
  - Rank: 32nd of 100
- Lowest elevation: 279 m (915 ft)
  - Rank: 84th of 100

Population (2026)
  - Total: 38,305
  - Rank: 2nd of 100
  - Density: 2,669/km^{2} (6,914/sq mi)
  - Rank: 2nd of 100
- Time zone: UTC+1 (CET)
  - Summer (DST): UTC+2 (CEST)
- LAU 2: LU0000204
- Website: www.esch.lu

Esch-sur-Alzette (Note: French pronunciation: [ɛʃ syʁ alzɛt], lit. 'Esch on Alzette'; Luxembourgish: Esch-Uelzecht [ˌæʒ ˈu̯əltsəɕt]; German: Esch an der Alzette [ˈɛʃ ʔan deːɐ̯ ʔalˈzɛt] or Esch an der Alzig) is a city in Luxembourg and the country's second-most populous commune, with a population of 37,922 inhabitants, as of 2025. It lies in the south-west of the country, on the border with France and in the valley of the Alzette, which flows through the city. The city is usually referred to as just Esch; however, the full name distinguishes it from the village and commune of Esch-sur-Sûre which lies 45 kilometres (28 mi) further north. The country's capital, Luxembourg City, is roughly 15 km (9.3 mi) to the north-east.

The town, first mentioned in the Middle Ages, remained a modest settlement for centuries until the discovery of iron ore in the 19th century transformed it into one of Luxembourg's main industrial centres. The rapid expansion of mining and steel production attracted workers from across Europe, shaping Esch into a multicultural urban community. After the decline of the steel industry in the late 20th century, the city underwent structural change.

Esch was selected as the European Capital of Culture for 2022, alongside Kaunas and Novi Sad.

== History ==
The town was mentioned for the first time in 12 April 1128 in a message for Pope Honorius II. For a long time Esch was a small farming village in the valley of the Uelzecht river. This changed when important amounts of iron ore were found in the area in the 1850s. With the development of the mines and the steel industry the town's population multiplied tenfold in a couple of decades. In 1911 the steel- and iron-producing company ARBED was founded. The development of the steel industry, especially in the south of the country, provided Luxembourg with sustained economic growth during the second half of the 19th century.

In the 1970s, as a result of the steel crisis, the mines and many of the blast furnaces were shut down, the last one, in Esch-Belval, definitively halting its operations in 1997. The blast furnaces were replaced by an electric furnace that is fed with scrap metal rather than iron ore.

Today the industrial wastelands on Belval left behind by the steel industry, are being redeveloped and converted into a new, modern town quarter. New cultural buildings such as the cinema Kinepolis Belval in the Belval Plaza shopping mall and the Rockhal, Luxembourg's biggest concert hall have been made.

The area around the old blast furnaces hosts different structures of the University of Luxembourg, many research centres and the national archives.

== Government and politics ==
=== Local ===
Esch is governed by its communal council, consisting of 19 councillors. Communal elections take place every 6 years, under a system of proportional representation. Currently the mayor is Christian Weis, of the Christian Social People's Party (CSV). The governing majority on the council consists of the CSV, the DP and The Greens.

2017 election results
Party		Popular vote	Seats	Change
G	Christian Social People's Party (CSV)	30.87%	6	▲2
	Luxembourg Socialist Workers' Party (LSAP)	27.86%	6	▼3
G	The Greens	13.54%	3	▲1
G	Democratic Party (DP)	9.11%	2	▲1
	The Left	9.53%	2	0
	Communist Party of Luxembourg (KPL)	4.14%	-	▼1
	Alternative Democratic Reform Party (ADR)	3.29%	-	
	Pirate Party of Luxembourg	1.66%	-	
	Total		19	

2023 election results
Party		Popular vote	Seats	Change
	Luxembourg Socialist Workers' Party (LSAP)	29.57%	6	0
G	Christian Social People's Party (CSV)	29.55%	6	0
G	Democratic Party (DP)	10.85%	2	0
G	The Greens	9.17%	2	▼1
	The Left	7.92%	1	▼1
	Alternative Democratic Reform Party (ADR)	5.56%	1	▲1
	Pirate Party of Luxembourg	5.31%	1	▲1
	Communist Party of Luxembourg (KPL)	2.08%	-	
	Total		19	

== Demographics ==
Historical population

Year	Pop.	±%
1821	810	—
1851	1,489	+83.8%
1871	3,946	+165.0%
1880	5,082	+28.8%
1890	6,855	+34.9%
1900	10,971	+60.0%
1910	16,461	+50.0%
1922	20,437	+24.2%
1930	29,429	+44.0%

Year	Pop.	±%
1947	26,851	−8.8%
1960	27,954	+4.1%
1970	27,574	−1.4%
1981	25,144	−8.8%
1991	24,018	−4.5%
2001	27,146	+13.0%
2011	30,125	+11.0%
2021	36,228	+20.3%

Source: Le Portail des Statistiques du Luxembourg

== Places of interest ==
The Lankelz miniature railway operates on Sunday afternoons and public holidays from May to mid-October.

Esch is home to the Esch Conservatory of Music.

The city has the longest shopping street in Luxembourg.

== Culture ==
=== Film production ===
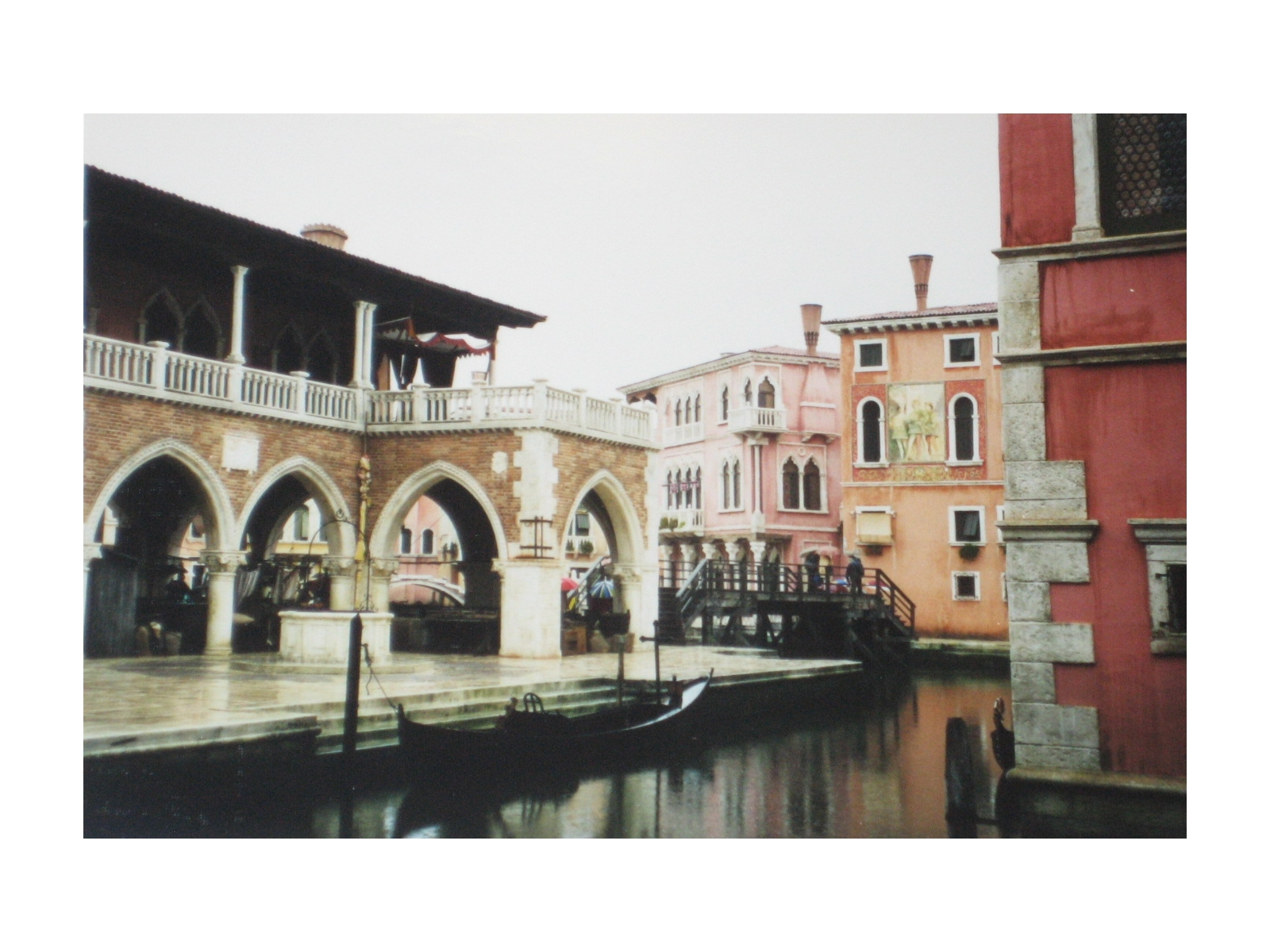
The Venice filmset in Esch (2001)

In 2001, a Luxembourg film production company had depicted a 40,000 m^{2} and 15 meter high backdrop built for the feature film Secret Passage with John Turturro on the Terre Rouge, a site of a former steelwork in Esch-sur Alzette. The filmset represents the contemporary Venice of the 16th century with a 600 meter long copy of the Grand Canal and 118 house facades. The "Venice-sur-Alzette" was built for around 5 million Euro and was one of the largest open-air film sets in European film history.

Between 2001 and 2007 many film productions used the gigantic filmset. Among others the feature films The Merchant of Venice with Al Pacino and The Girl with the Pearl Earring with Scarlett Johansson were shot in Esch. In the summer of 2007, the filmset was torn down because the weather was affecting the buildings.

=== European Capital of Culture for 2022 ===
The city of Esch-sur-Alzette was selected as the European Capital of Culture for 2022, alongside Kaunas and Novi Sad.

== Transport ==
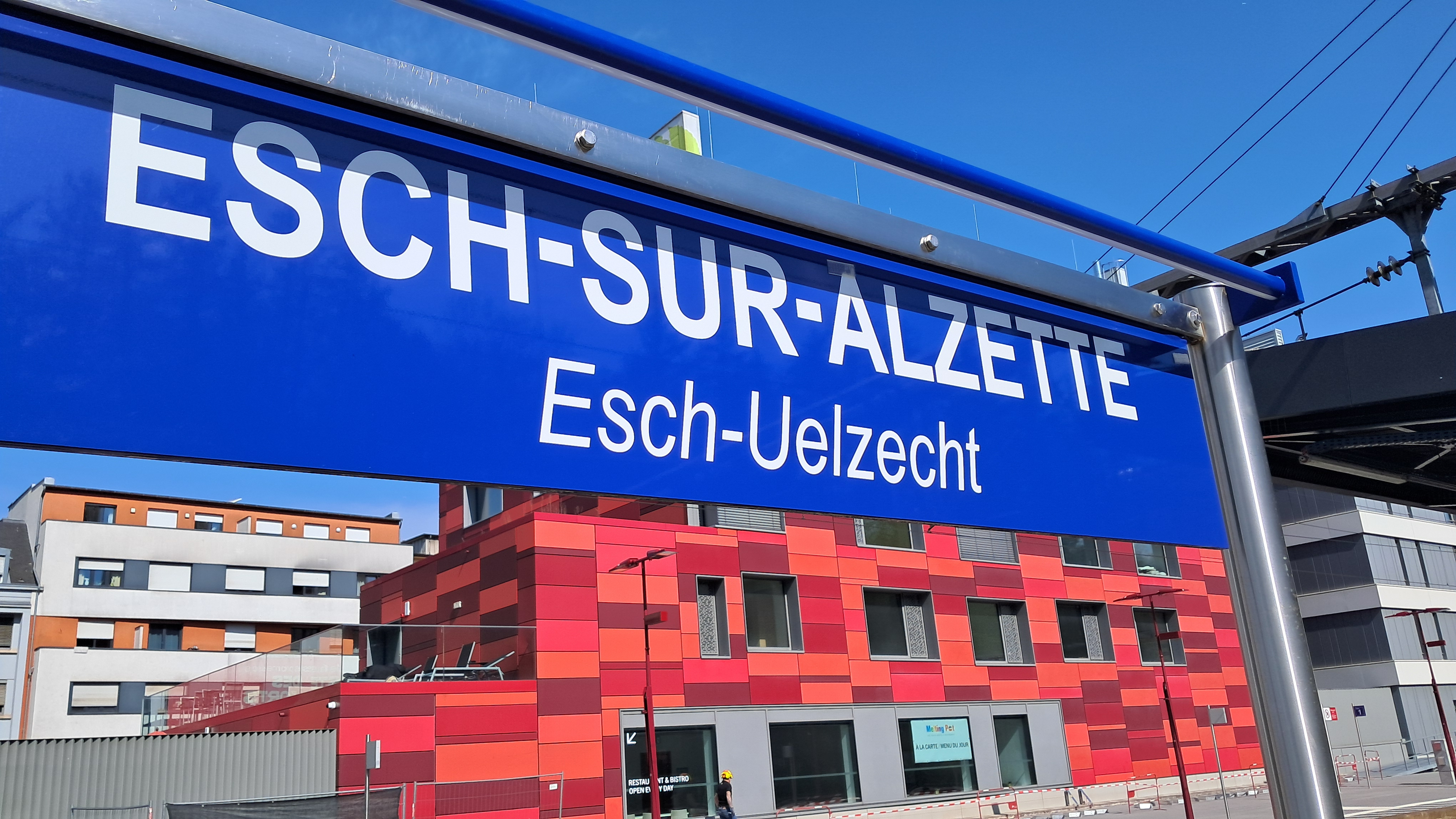
Sign at Esch-sur-Alzette railway station

Esch is connected by the bus lines 1, 2, 3, 4, 5, 7, 12, 13, 15 and 17 of the communal public transport company T.I.C.E. (transports intercommunales du canton Esch/Alzette, intercommunal transportation of the canton Esch/Alzette). Their maintenance depot and headquarter is situated in Esch, and Esch also is connected by lines 307, 312, 313 and 314 of the R.G.T.R.

== Notable people ==
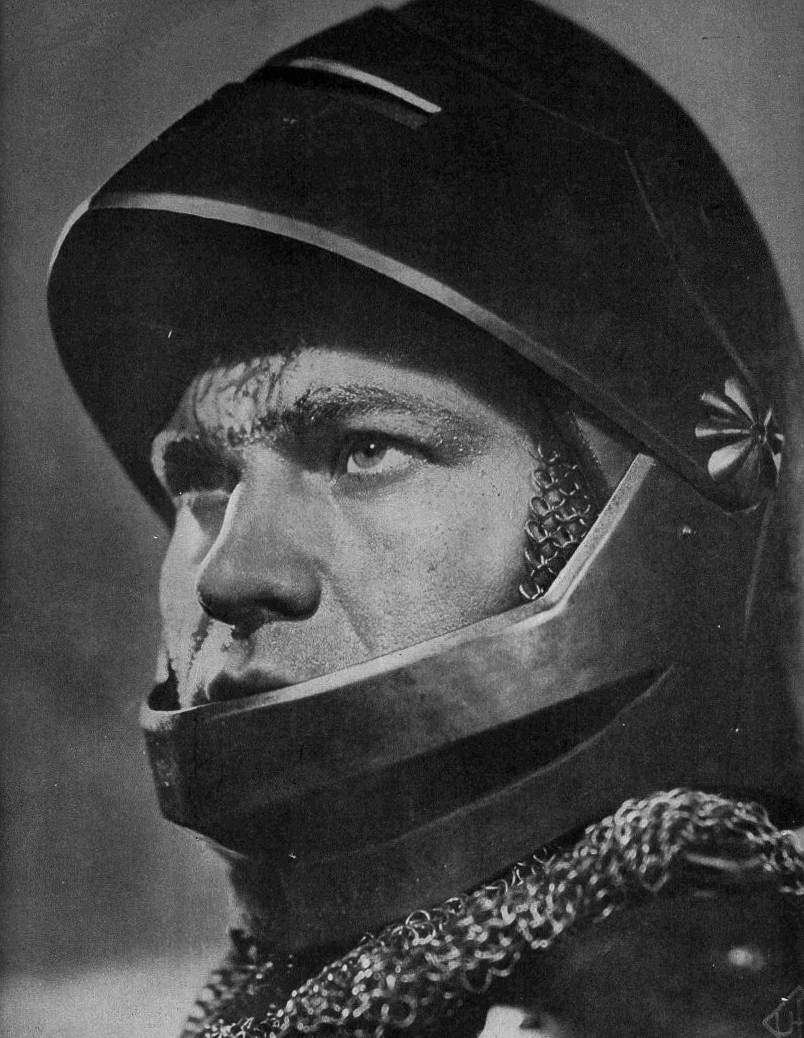
René Deltgen, 1935

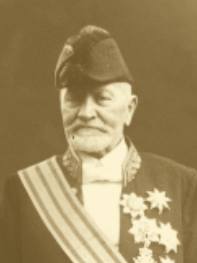
Victor Thorn

- François Biltgen (born 1958), politician, Minister for Justice and judge at the European Court of Justice
- Dominique Brasseur (1833–1906), politician and jurist, Mayor of Luxembourg City 1891/1894.
- René Deltgen (1909–1979), stage and film actor
- Jean Ellis (1946–2006), emergency department physician and climber
- Camillo Felgen (1920–2005), singer, lyricist, disc jockey and TV presenter
- Fernand Franck (born 1934), prelate of the Catholic Church and Archbishop of Luxembourg, 1990/2011.
- Luc Frieden (born 1963), politician and lawyer, 25th Prime Minister of Luxembourg
- Gust Graas (1924–2020), abstract painter and businessman, helped develop radio and television group RTL.
- Pierre Gramegna (born 1958), career diplomat and politician
- Émile Hamilius (1897–1971), footballer, politician and Mayor of Luxembourg City, 1946/1963
- Paul Helminger (1940–2021), politician who was Mayor of Luxembourg City, 1999/2011
- William Justin Kroll (1889–1973), metallurgist, invented the Kroll process in 1940
- Gérard López (born 1971), Luxembourgish-Spanish businessman
- Karin Monschauer (born 1960), embroiderer and digital artist
- Désirée Nosbusch (born 1965), actress and TV presenter.
- Viviane Reding (born 1951), politician, MEP, European Commissioner & Vice-president of the European Commission
- Maggy Stein (1931–1999), sculptor, died locally
- Victor Thorn (1844–1930), politician and the 11th Prime Minister of Luxembourg, 1916/1917.
- Steve Thull (born 1967), Army general and Chief of Defence (Luxembourg)
- Laura Thorn (born 2000), singer and music teacher, represented Luxembourg in the Eurovision Song Contest 2025

=== Sport ===
- Gilles Bettmer (born 1989), footballer with over 240 games and 58 for Luxembourg
- Mandy Minella (born 1985), former tennis player, now Member of Parliament
- Louis Pilot (1940–2016), footballer and manager, played over 450 games and 49 for Luxembourg

== Twin towns – sister cities ==
Esch-sur-Alzette is twinned with:

- Coimbra, Portugal
- Cologne, Germany
- Liège, Belgium
- Lille, France
- Mödling, Austria
- Offenbach am Main, Germany
- Puteaux, France
- Rotterdam, Netherlands
- Turin, Italy
- Velletri, Italy
- Zemun, Serbia
- Stryi, Ukraine
