= Mario Daubenfeld =

General Mario Daubenfeld
- Born: 16 January 1958 (age 68); Wasserbillig, Luxembourg
- Children: 1
- Military career
- Allegiance: Luxembourg
- Branch: Luxembourg Armed Forces
- Rank: General

General Mario Daubenfeld (born 16 January 1958) is a Luxembourgish soldier and a former Chief of Defence of the Luxembourg Army. He is also a political activist.

He replaced Gaston Reinig as Chief of Defence in 2013. He was replaced by Romain Mancinelli in 2014.

He is an active member of the Alternative Democratic Reform Party (ADR), a conservative political party in Luxembourg. Since 2016, he has been the President of the Bezierk Center.

Military offices
Preceded by Gaston Reinig	Chief of Defence; 2013 – 2014	Succeeded by Romain Mancinelli
