= Chief of Defence (Luxembourg) =

Head of the army of Luxembourg

- Chef d’État-major de l'Armée (French)

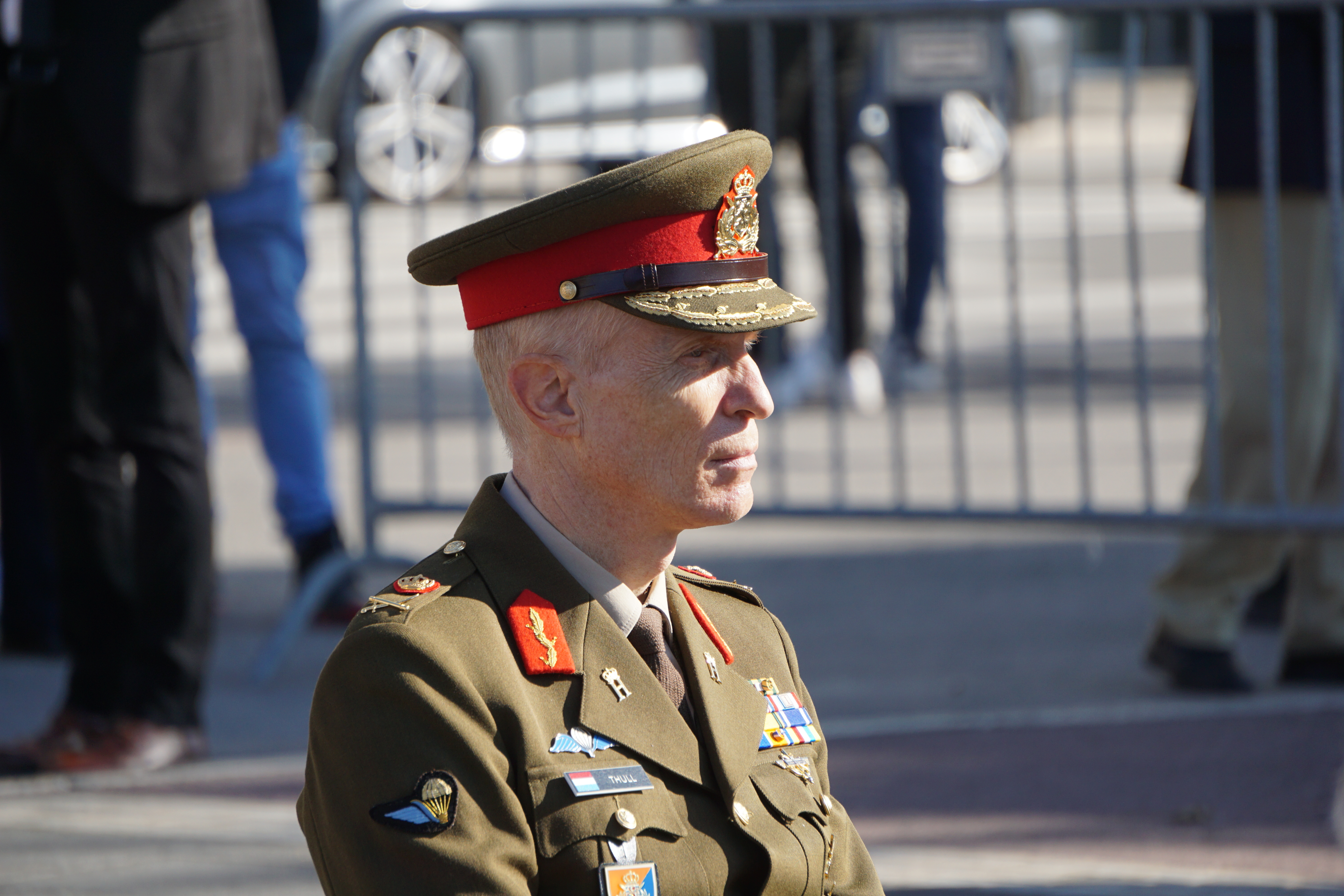
- Incumbent; General Steve Thull since 29 September 2020
- Luxembourg Army
- Member of: Ministry for Defence
- Reports to: The Grand Duke
- Formation: 15 July 1967
- First holder: Colonel Michel Mayer
- Deputy: Deputy Chief of Defence
- Website: Official website

The Chief of Defence (French: Chef d’État-major de l'Armée) is a position in the military of Luxembourg and head of the Luxembourg Army. The Chief of Defence is the professional head of the armed forces, and in charge of the day-to-day operation. The current Chief of Defence is Steve Thull.

He is formally subordinate to the Grand Duke, whom the Constitution names as the commander-in-chief, but answers to the Minister for Defence in the civilian government.

== List of Chiefs of Defence ==
No.	Portrait	Chief of Defence	Took office	Left office	Time in office
1	Michel Mayer	Colonel; Michel Mayer	15 July 1967	9 October 1972	5 years, 86 days
2	Pierre Dauffenbach	Colonel; Pierre Dauffenbach	9 October 1972	4 February 1976	3 years, 118 days
3	Jean Betz	Colonel; Jean Betz	4 February 1976	9 March 1980	4 years, 34 days
4	François Welfring	Colonel; François Welfring	9 March 1980	13 May 1984	4 years, 65 days
5	Nicolas Ley	Colonel; Nicolas Ley	13 May 1984	21 February 1988	3 years, 284 days
6	Armand Bruck	Colonel; Armand Bruck	21 February 1988	4 November 1994	6 years, 256 days
7	Michel Gretsch	Colonel; Michel Gretsch	4 November 1994	2 July 1998	3 years, 240 days
8	Guy Lenz	Colonel; Guy Lenz (born 1946)	2 July 1998	28 January 2002	3 years, 210 days
9	Nico Ries	Colonel; Nico Ries (born 1953)	28 January 2002	15 January 2008	5 years, 352 days
10	Gaston Reinig	General; Gaston Reinig (born 1956)	15 January 2008	1 February 2013	5 years, 17 days
11	Mario Daubenfeld	General; Mario Daubenfeld (born 1958)	1 February 2013	1 December 2014	1 year, 303 days
12	Romain Mancinelli	General; Romain Mancinelli (born 1959)	1 December 2014	29 September 2017	2 years, 302 days
13	Alain Duschène	General; Alain Duschène (born 1960)	29 September 2017	29 September 2020	3 years, 0 days
14	Steve Thull	General; Steve Thull (born 1967)	29 September 2020	Incumbent	5 years, 343 days

Source: Army of Luxembourg
