= Romain Mancinelli =

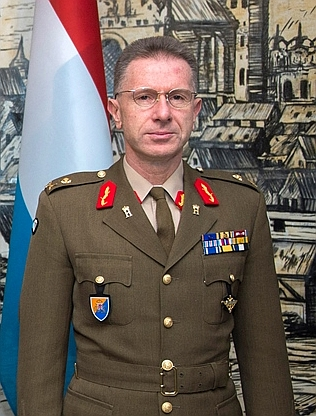
- Romain Mancinelli in 2015
- Born: June 19, 1959 (age 67)
- Children: 2 daughters
- Military career
- Rank: General

Romain Mancinelli (born 19 June 1959) is a retired Luxembourg Army general. On 1 December 2014, he became Luxembourg's Chief of Defence, the professional head of the country's military, replacing former chief of defence General Mario Daubenfeld. He retired on 29 September 2017.

He graduated in 1982 from the École Royale Militaire (ERM) in Brussels.

== Decorations and awards ==
- Commander, Order of Merit of the Grand Duchy of Luxembourg
- 25 Years Service Cross
- Croix d'Honneur et de Mérite Militaire in Bronze
- Prince Jean de Luxembourg Commemorative Medal
- Commander, Order of the Oak Crown
- Officer, Order of Adolphe of Nassau
