= Fernand Guth =

Luxembourgish footballer

Personal information
- Date of birth: 3 May 1926
- Place of birth: Luxembourg, Luxembourg
- Date of death: 23 August 1977 (aged 51)
- Place of death: Luxembourg, Luxembourg

International career
| Years | Team | Apps | (Gls) |
- Luxembourg

Fernand Guth (3 May 1926 – 23 August 1977) was a Luxembourgish footballer. He competed in the men's tournament at the 1952 Summer Olympics.
