= List of performers on Frank Zappa records =

This is a list of musicians who have performed on officially released Frank Zappa recordings. This list does not include musicians who have performed as guest musicians at Frank Zappa concerts unless they appear on official live recordings. Additionally, this list does not include musicians who have only appeared on the London Symphony Orchestra albums or bootleg recordings.

== A ==
Name	Year(s)	Appeared on	Instrument
Murray Adler	1978, 1996	Studio Tan, Läther	Violin
Phyllis Altenhaus	1987	Uncle Meat	Voice
Mike Altschul	1972, 1978–1981, 1996, 2004, 2007, 2008	Waka/Jawaka, The Grand Wazoo, Studio Tan, Orchestral Favorites, Tinseltown Rebellion, Läther, QuAUDIOPHILIAc, Wazoo, One Shot Deal	Woodwinds
Jay Anderson	1983–1985	The Man from Utopia, Thing-Fish, Cruising with Ruben & the Jets (1985 Remix)	Bass
Peter Arcaro	1962, 1996	The Lost Episodes	Trumpet, Conductor
Harold Ayres	1968	Lumpy Gravy	Violin

== B ==
Name	Year(s)	Appeared on	Instrument
John Balkin	1967–1970	Absolutely Free, Lumpy Gravy, Burnt Weeny Sandwich	Bass
Spider Barbour	1968, 1985, 1994	We're Only in It for the Money, Lumpy Gravy, Frank Zappa Meets the Mothers of Prevention, Civilization, Phaze III	Voice
Philip Barnett	1962, 1996	The Lost Episodes	Oboe, English horn
Gary Barone	1972, 2006, 2008	Imaginary Diseases, One Shot Deal	Trumpet, Flugelhorn
Benjamin Barrett	1966	Freak Out!	Violin
Arthur Barrow	1979–1985, 1988, 1991–1992, 1996, 1997, 2003, 2006, 2007, 2008	Joe's Garage, Tinseltown Rebellion, Shut Up 'n Play Yer Guitar, You Are What You Is, Ship Arriving Too Late to Save a Drowning Witch, The Man from Utopia, Them or Us, Thing-Fish, We're Only in It for the Money (1985 Remix), Cruising with Ruben & the Jets (1985 Remix), Frank Zappa Meets the Mothers of Prevention, Guitar, You Can't Do That on Stage Anymore, Vol. 1, You Can't Do That on Stage Anymore, Vol. 4, You Can't Do That on Stage Anymore, Vol. 6, The Lost Episodes, Frank Zappa Plays the Music of Frank Zappa: A Memorial Tribute, Have I Offended Someone?, Halloween, Trance-Fusion, Buffalo, One Shot Deal	Bass, Organ, Keyboards, Guitar, Synth, Vocals
Massimo Bassoli	1987, 1989	Uncle Meat (1987 Version), You Can't Do That on Stage Anymore, Vol. 3	Voice, Vocals
Edwin V. Beach	1966	Freak Out!	Cello
Bobby Beausoleil	1966	Freak Out!	Vocals
Adrian Belew	1977–1978, 1983, 1988, 1989, 1992, 1996, 1997, 2004, 2006, 2008	Sheik Yerbouti, Baby Snakes, You Can't Do That on Stage Anymore, Vol. 1, You Can't Do That on Stage Anymore, Vol. 3, You Can't Do That on Stage Anymore, Vol. 6, Have I Offended Someone?, QuAUDIOPHILIAc, Trance-Fusion, One Shot Deal	Guitar, Vocals
Norma Jean Bell	1975, 1996	Frank Zappa Plays the Music of Frank Zappa: A Memorial Tribute	Alto sax, Vocals
Arnold Belnick	1968	Lumpy Gravy	Violin
Harold G. Bemko	1968	Lumpy Gravy	Cello
Max Bennett	1969, 1970, 1978, 1996, 2004	Hot Rats, Chunga's Revenge, Studio Tan, The Lost Episodes, Läther, QuAUDIOPHILIAc	Bass
John Bergamo	1978, 1978, 1981, 1996, 2004, 2008	Zappa in New York, Studio Tan, Orchestral Favorites, Tinseltown Rebellion, Läther, QuAUDIOPHILIAc, One Shot Deal	Percussion
Charles Berghofer	1968	Lumpy Gravy	Bass
Paul Bergstrom	1966	Freak Out!	Cello
John Berkman	1978, 1996	Studio Tan, Läther	Piano
Rodney Bingenheimer	1987	Uncle Meat (1987 CD Version)	Voice
Jimmy Carl Black	1966–1971, 1981, 1988, 1966, 1991, 1992, 1993, 1996, 1997, 2004	Freak Out!, Absolutely Free, We're Only in It for the Money, Lumpy Gravy, Cruising with Ruben & the Jets, Uncle Meat, Burnt Weeny Sandwich, Weasels Ripped My Flesh, 200 Motels, You Are What You Is, You Can't Do That on Stage Anymore, Vol. 1, You Can't Do That on Stage Anymore, Vol. 4, You Can't Do That on Stage Anymore, Vol. 5, You Can't Do That on Stage Anymore, Vol. 6, Ahead of Their Time, The Lost Episodes, Have I Offended Someone?, Joe's Corsage	Drums, Trumpet, Vocals
James E. Bond	1968	Lumpy Gravy	Bass
Monica Boscia	1968, 1985, 1994	Lumpy Gravy, Frank Zappa Meets the Mothers of Prevention, Civilization, Phaze III	Voice
Andreas Böttger	1993, 1994, 1999	The Yellow Shark, Civilization, Phaze III, Everything Is Healing Nicely	Percussions
Pierre Boulez	1984	Boulez Conducts Zappa: The Perfect Stranger	Conductor
Dale Bozzio	1979, 1984, 1996, 1997	Joe's Garage, Thing-Fish, The Lost Episodes, Läther, Have I Offended Someone?	Voice, Vocals
Terry Bozzio	1975–1979, 1981, 1984, 1977, 1983, 1984, 1988, 1989, 1991, 1992, 1996, 1997, 2002, 2004, 2006, 2008	Bongo Fury, Zoot Allures, Zappa in New York, Studio Tan, Sleep Dirt, Sheik Yerbouti, Orchestral Favorites, Joe's Garage, Shut Up 'n Play Yer Guitar, Baby Snakes, Thing-Fish, You Can't Do That on Stage Anymore, Vol. 1, You Can't Do That on Stage Anymore, Vol. 3, You Can't Do That on Stage Anymore, Vol. 4, You Can't Do That on Stage Anymore, Vol. 6, The Lost Episodes, Läther, Frank Zappa Plays the Music of Frank Zappa: A Memorial Tribute, Have I Offended Someone?, FZ:OZ, QuAUDIOPHILIAc, Trance-Fusion, One Shot Deal	Drums, Vocals
Michael Brecker	1976, 1978, 1992, 1996, 1997	Zappa in New York, You Can't Do That on Stage Anymore, Vol. 6, The Lost Episodes, Have I Offended Someone?	Tenor saxophone, Flute
Randy Brecker	1976, 1978, 1992, 1996, 1997	Zappa in New York, You Can't Do That on Stage Anymore, Vol. 6, The Lost Episodes, Have I Offended Someone?	Trumpet
Don Brewer	1978, 1996	Studio Tan, Läther	Bongos
Arthur E. Briegleb	1968, 1978, 1979, 1981, 1996, 2004, 2008	Lumpy Gravy, Studio Tan, Orchestral Favorites, Tinseltown Rebellion, Läther, QuAUDIOPHILIAc, One Shot Deal	French horn
Napoleon Murphy Brock	1973–1976, 1979, 1973, 1984, 1988, 1989, 1991, 1992, 1996, 1997, 2002, 2004, 2004, 2007, 2008	Apostrophe, Roxy & Elsewhere, One Size Fits All, Bongo Fury, Zoot Allures, Sheik Yerbouti, Them or Us, Thing-Fish, You Can't Do That on Stage Anymore, Vol. 1, You Can't Do That on Stage Anymore, Vol. 2, You Can't Do That on Stage Anymore, Vol. 3, You Can't Do That on Stage Anymore, Vol. 4, You Can't Do That on Stage Anymore, Vol. 6, Frank Zappa Plays the Music of Frank Zappa: A Memorial Tribute, Have I Offended Someone?, FZ:OZ, QuAUDIOPHILIAc, The Dub Room Special, One Shot Deal	Saxophone, Flute, Vocals
Jack Bruce	1974	Apostrophe (')	Bass
Phyllis Bryn-Julson	1971	200 Motels	Vocals
Dennis Budimir	1968	Lumpy Gravy	Guitar
Paul C. Buff	1996	The Lost Episodes	Fuzz bass
Eric Buxton	1988	Broadway the Hard Way	Voice
Bill Byers	1972	Waka/Jawaka, The Grand Wazoo	Trombone, Baritone horn

== C ==
Name	Year(s)	Appeared on	Instrument
Robert "Frog" Camarena	1974–1975, 2014	Apostrophe, Roxy & Elsewhere, Bongo Fury, Joe's Camouflage	Vocals, Guitar
Frankie Capp	1968	Lumpy Gravy	Drums
Paul Carman	1988, 1991, 1992, 2006	Broadway the Hard Way, The Best Band You Never Heard in Your Life, You Can't Do That on Stage Anymore, Vol. 4, Make a Jazz Noise Here, You Can't Do That on Stage Anymore, Vol. 6, Trance-Fusion	Saxophone
Chuck Carter	1985, 1996	The Lost Episodes	Saxophone, Flute
Chuck Connolly	1973, 1974	Over-nite Sensation	Percussions, vocals
Roy Caton	1966	Freak Out!	Saxophone, Flute
Donald Christlieb	1968, 1996	Lumpy Gravy, The Lost Episodes	Saxophone, Flute
Gene Cipriano	1968	Lumpy Gravy	Woodwinds
Eric Clapton	1968	We're Only in It for the Money	Voice
Lee Clement	1972	The Grand Wazoo	Gong
Lisa Cohen	1967	Absolutely Free	Voice
Vinnie Colaiuta	1978–1981, 1983, 1988, 1991, 1992, 1996, 1997, 2003, 2006, 2007, 2008	Joe's Garage, Tinseltown Rebellion, Shut Up 'n Play Yer Guitar, The Man from Utopia, Guitar, You Can't Do That on Stage Anymore, Vol. 1, You Can't Do That on Stage Anymore, Vol. 4, You Can't Do That on Stage Anymore, Vol. 6, The Lost Episodes, Frank Zappa Plays the Music of Frank Zappa: A Memorial Tribute, Have I Offended Someone?, Halloween, Trance-Fusion, Buffalo, One Shot Deal	Drums, Voice
Brad Cole	1984	Them or Us	Piano
Ray Collins	1965–1970, 1974, 1985, 1986, 1992, 1996, 2004, 2005, 2006	Freak Out!, Absolutely Free, Lumpy Gravy, Cruising with Ruben & the Jets, Uncle Meat, Weasels Ripped My Flesh, Apostrophe, You Can't Do That on Stage Anymore, Vol. 5, The Lost Episodes, Joe's Corsage, Joe's XMASage	Tambourine, Harmonica, Vocals
Ronnie Cuber	1976, 1978, 1992, 1996, 1997	Zappa in New York, You Can't Do That on Stage Anymore, Vol. 6, Läther, Have I Offended Someone?	Saxophone, Clarinet
Warren Cuccurullo	1978, 1979, 1981, 1983, 1988, 1991, 1992, 1996, 1997, 2006, 2008	Joe's Garage, Tinseltown Rebellion, Shut Up 'n Play Yer Guitar, Baby Snakes, You Can't Do That on Stage Anymore, Vol. 1, You Can't Do That on Stage Anymore, Vol. 4, You Can't Do That on Stage Anymore, Vol. 6, Frank Zappa Plays the Music of Frank Zappa: A Memorial Tribute, Have I Offended Someone?, Trance-Fusion, One Shot Deal	Guitar, Electric sitar, Vocals
Louis Cuneo	1968, 1981, 1994	Lumpy Gravy, Shut Up 'n Play Yer Guitar, Civilization, Phaze III	Voice

== D ==
Name	Year(s)	Appeared on	Instrument
Friedemann Dähn	1993, 1994, 1999	The Yellow Shark, Civilization, Phaze III, Everything Is Healing Nicely	Cello
Jay Daversa	1978, 1996	Studio Tan, Läther	Trumpet
Vincent DeRosa	1968	Lumpy Gravy	French horn
Eugene Di Novi	1966	Freak Out!	Piano
Uwe Dierksen	1993, 1994, 1999	The Yellow Shark, Civilization, Phaze III, Everything Is Healing Nicely	Trombone, Voice
Joseph DiFiore	1968	Lumpy Gravy	Viola
Alvin Dinkin	1967	Absolutely Free	Viola
Roland Diry	1993, 1994, 1999	The Yellow Shark, Civilization, Phaze III, Everything Is Healing Nicely	Clarinet
Alex Dmochowski	1972, 1974, 1996, 2004	Waka/Jawaka, The Grand Wazoo, Apostrophe, The Lost Episodes, QuAUDIOPHILIAc, Joe's Domage	Bass, Vocals
Stefan Dohr	1993, 1994, 1999	The Yellow Shark, Civilization, Phaze III, Everything Is Healing Nicely	French horn, Voice
Chuck Domanico	1985, 1996	The Lost Episodes	Bass
Bobby Dubow	1978, 1979, 1981, 1996, 2004, 2008	Studio Tan, Orchestral Favorites, Tinseltown Rebellion, Läther, QuAUDIOPHILIAc, One Shot Deal	Violin
David E. Duke	1968, 1978, 1979, 1981, 1996, 2004, 2008	Lumpy Gravy, Studio Tan, Orchestral Favorites, Tinseltown Rebellion, Läther, QuAUDIOPHILIAc, One Shot Deal	French horn
George Duke	1970–1975, 1978, 1979, 1984, 1988, 1989, 1991, 1992, 1996, 1997, 2004, 2007	Chunga's Revenge, 200 Motels, Waka/Jawaka, The Grand Wazoo, Over-Nite Sensation, Apostrophe, Roxy & Elsewhere, One Size Fits All, Bongo Fury, Studio Tan, Sleep Dirt, Them or Us, You Can't Do That on Stage Anymore, Vol. 1, You Can't Do That on Stage Anymore, Vol. 2, You Can't Do That on Stage Anymore, Vol. 3, You Can't Do That on Stage Anymore, Vol. 4, You Can't Do That on Stage Anymore, Vol. 6, Playground Psychotics, The Lost Episodes, Läther, Frank Zappa Plays the Music of Frank Zappa: A Memorial Tribute, Have I Offended Someone?, QuAUDIOPHILIAc, The Dub Room Special, One Shot Deal	Trombone, Keyboards, Vocals
Earle Dumler	1972, 1978, 1979, 1981, 1996, 2004, 2006, 2007, 2008	The Grand Wazoo, Studio Tan, Orchestral Favorites, Joe's Garage, Tinseltown Rebellion, Läther, QuAUDIOPHILIAc, Imaginary Diseases, Wazoo, One Shot Deal	Woodwinds
Aynsley Dunbar	1970–1972, 1974, 1972, 1987, 1988, 1989, 1992, 1996, 2004	Chunga's Revenge, Fillmore East - June 1971, 200 Motels, Just Another Band from L.A., Waka/Jawaka, The Grand Wazoo, Apostrophe, Uncle Meat (1987 CD Version), You Can't Do That on Stage Anymore, Vol. 1, You Can't Do That on Stage Anymore, Vol. 3, You Can't Do That on Stage Anymore, Vol. 6, Playground Psychotics, The Lost Episodes, QuAUDIOPHILIAc, Joe's Domage	Drums, Percussions, Voice
Tony Duran	1972, 1974, 2004, 2006, 2007, 2008	Waka/Jawaka, The Grand Wazoo, Apostrophe, Joe's Domage, Imaginary Diseases, Wazoo, One Shot Deal	Guitar

== E ==
Name	Year(s)	Appeared on	Instrument
Jesse Ehrlich	1968	Lumpy Gravy	Cello
Joan Elardo	1978, 1979, 1981, 1996, 2004, 2006	Studio Tan, Orchestral Favorites, Tinseltown Rebellion, Läther, QuAUDIOPHILIAc, One Shot Deal	Oboe, English horn
Don Ellis	1967	Absolutely Free	Trumpet
Jock Ellis	1978, 1979, 1981, 1996, 2004, 2006	Studio Tan, Orchestral Favorites, Tinseltown Rebellion, Läther, QuAUDIOPHILIAc, One Shot Deal	Trombone
Alan Estes	1968, 1972, 1978, 1979, 1981, 1996, 2004, 2006	Lumpy Gravy, The Grand Wazoo, Studio Tan, Orchestral Favorites, Tinseltown Rebellion, Läther, QuAUDIOPHILIAc, One Shot Deal	Percussions
Gene P. Estes	1966, 1968	Freak Out!, Lumpy Gravy	Percussions
Roy Estrada	1966–1970, 1972, 1976, 1982–1984, 1988, 1989, 1991–1997, 2004	Freak Out!, Absolutely Free, We're Only in It for the Money, Lumpy Gravy, Cruising with Ruben & the Jets, Uncle Meat, Burnt Weeny Sandwich, Weasels Ripped My Flesh, Zoot Allures, Shut Up 'n Play Yer Guitar, Ship Arriving Too Late to Save a Drowning Witch, The Man from Utopia, Baby Snakes, Them or Us, Thing-Fish, You Can't Do That on Stage Anymore, Vol. 1, You Can't Do That on Stage Anymore, Vol. 3, You Can't Do That on Stage Anymore, Vol. 4, You Can't Do That on Stage Anymore, Vol. 5, You Can't Do That on Stage Anymore, Vol. 6, Ahead of Their Time, Civilization, Phaze III, Läther, Frank Zappa Plays the Music of Frank Zappa: A Memorial Tribute, Have I Offended Someone?, FZ:OZ, Joe's Corsage, QuAUDIOPHILIAc	Bass, Vocals
Virgil Evans	1966	Freak Out!	Trumpet

== F ==
Name	Year(s)	Appeared on	Instrument
Dick Fegy	1983	The Man from Utopia	Mandolin
Victor Feldman	1968	Lumpy Gravy	Percussions
Janet-Neville Ferguson Hof	1970, 1972, 1987	Burnt Weeny Sandwich, Waka/Jawaka, The Grand Wazoo, Uncle Meat (1987 CD Version)	Vocals
Glenn Ferris	2006, 2007, 2008	Imaginary Diseases, Wazoo, One Shot Deal	Trombone, Euphonium
Thomas Fichter	1993, 1994, 1999	The Yellow Shark, Civilization, Phaze III, Everything Is Healing Nicely	Bass
Jim Fielder	1967	Absolutely Free	Guitar
Floyd	2005	Joe's XMASage	Vocals
William Formann	1993, 1994, 1999	The Yellow Shark, Civilization, Phaze III, Everything Is Healing Nicely	Woodwinds
Chuck Foster	1965, 1996	The Lost Episodes	Trumpet
Bruce Fowler	1972–1981, 1988, 1989, 1991, 1992, 1996, 2004, 1992, 2007, 2008	Over-Nite Sensation, Apostrophe, Roxy & Elsewhere, Bongo Fury, Zoot Allures, Studio Tan, Sleep Dirt, Orchestral Favorites, Tinseltown Rebellion, You Can't Do That on Stage Anymore, Vol. 1, Broadway the Hard Way, You Can't Do That on Stage Anymore, Vol. 3, The Best Band You Never Heard in Your Life, You Can't Do That on Stage Anymore, Vol. 4, Make a Jazz Noise Here, You Can't Do That on Stage Anymore, Vol. 6, The Lost Episodes, Läther, QuAUDIOPHILIAc, Imaginary Diseases, Trance-Fusion, Wazoo, One Shot Deal	Trombone
Tom Fowler	1973–1975, 1978, 1988, 1989, 1991, 1992, 1996, 1997, 2004, 2007, 2008	Over-Nite Sensation, Apostrophe, Roxy & Elsewhere, Bongo Fury, Studio Tan, You Can't Do That on Stage Anymore, Vol. 1, You Can't Do That on Stage Anymore, Vol. 2, You Can't Do That on Stage Anymore, Vol. 3, You Can't Do That on Stage Anymore, Vol. 4, You Can't Do That on Stage Anymore, Vol. 6, The Lost Episodes, Läther, Frank Zappa Plays the Music of Frank Zappa: A Memorial Tribute, Have I Offended Someone?, QuAUDIOPHILIAc, The Dub Room Special, One Shot Deal	Bass
Walt Fowler	1974, 1988, 1991, 1992, 1994, 1992	Roxy & Elsewhere, Broadway the Hard Way, The Best Band You Never Heard in Your Life, Make a Jazz Noise Here, You Can't Do That on Stage Anymore, Vol. 6, Civilization, Phaze III, Trance-Fusion	Trumpet, Flugel horn, Keyboards, Voice
Kim Fowley	1966	Freak Out!	Hypophone

== G ==
Name	Year(s)	Appeared on	Instrument
John Leon Bunk Gardner (Guarnera)	1967–1970, 1988, 1991, 1992, 1993	Absolutely Free, We're Only in It for the Money, Lumpy Gravy, Cruising with Ruben & the Jets, Uncle Meat, Burnt Weeny Sandwich, Weasels Ripped My Flesh, You Can't Do That on Stage Anymore, Vol. 1, You Can't Do That on Stage Anymore, Vol. 4, You Can't Do That on Stage Anymore, Vol. 5, Ahead of Their Time	Woodwinds
Charles Buzz Gardner (Guarnera)	1970, 1988, 1991, 1992, 1993	Burnt Weeny Sandwich, Weasels Ripped My Flesh, You Can't Do That on Stage Anymore, Vol. 1, You Can't Do That on Stage Anymore, Vol. 4, You Can't Do That on Stage Anymore, Vol. 5	Trumpet, Vocals
Lowell George	1968–1969, 1970, 1988, 1991, 1992	Hot Rats, Burnt Weeny Sandwich, Weasels Ripped My Flesh, You Can't Do That on Stage Anymore, Vol. 1, You Can't Do That on Stage Anymore, Vol. 4, You Can't Do That on Stage Anymore, Vol. 5	Guitar, Vocals
Jim Getzoff	1967, 1968	Absolutely Free, Lumpy Gravy	Violin
Terry Gilliam	1966, 1967	Freak Out!, Absolutely Free	Voice, Noises
Chuck Glave	1996	The Lost Episodes	Drums
Susie Glover	1974	Apostrophe (')	Vocals
Gene Goe	1978–1981, 1996, 2004, 2008	Studio Tan, Orchestral Favorites, Tinseltown Rebellion, Läther, QuAUDIOPHILIAc, One Shot Deal	Trumpet
Phillip Goldberg	1968	Lumpy Gravy	Viola
Pamela Goldsmith	1978–1981, 1996, 2004, 2008	Studio Tan, Orchestral Favorites, Tinseltown Rebellion, Läther, QuAUDIOPHILIAc, One Shot Deal	Viola
Jim Gordon	1972, 1974, 1996, 2006, 2007, 2008	Apostrophe, Imaginary Diseases, Wazoo, One Shot Deal	Drums, Steel drums
Ralph Grierson	1978–1981, 1996, 2004, 2008	Studio Tan, Orchestral Favorites, Tinseltown Rebellion, Läther, QuAUDIOPHILIAc, One Shot Deal	Keyboards
Michael Gross	1993, 1994, 1999	The Yellow Shark, Civilization, Phaze III, Everything Is Healing Nicely	Brass, Voice
John Guerin	1968–1970, 1974, 1996	Lumpy Gravy, Hot Rats, Chunga's Revenge, Apostrophe, The Lost Episodes	Drums
Norman Gunston (aka Garry McDonald)	1976	FZ:OZ	Harmonica, Vocals

== H ==
Name	Year(s)	Appeared on	Instrument
Bruce Hampton	1968	Lumpy Gravy	Voice
Bob Harris	1971, 1992	Fillmore East - June 1971, You Can't Do That on Stage Anymore, Vol. 6, Playground Psychotics	Keyboards, Vocals
Bob Harris	1980–1984, 1997, 2007	Tinseltown Rebellion, Shut Up 'n Play Yer Guitar, You Are What You Is, Ship Arriving Too Late to Save a Drowning Witch, The Man from Utopia, Them or Us, You Can't Do That on Stage Anymore, Vol. 6, Have I Offended Someone?, Buffalo	Keyboards, Trumpet, Vocals
Don "Sugarcane" Harris	1969, 1970, 1974, 1996	Hot Rats, Burnt Weeny Sandwich, Weasels Ripped My Flesh, Chunga's Revenge, Apostrophe, The Lost Episodes	Violin, Organ, Vocals
Suzannah Harris	1969, 1991	Them or Us, Sleep Dirt (1991 CD Version)	Vocals
Jim Haynes	1968	Lumpy Gravy	Guitar
Danny Helferin	1996	The Lost Episodes	Piano
Bob Henderson	1978–1981, 1996, 2004, 2008	Studio Tan, Orchestral Favorites, Tinseltown Rebellion, Läther, QuAUDIOPHILIAc, One Shot Deal	French horn
Jeff Hollie	1979	Joe's Garage	Saxophone
Geordie Hormel	1979	Joe's Garage	Vocals
Dana Hughes	1978–1981, 1996, 2004, 2008	Studio Tan, Orchestral Favorites, Tinseltown Rebellion, Läther, QuAUDIOPHILIAc, One Shot Deal	Bass trombone
Paul Humphrey	1969, 1978, 1996	Hot Rats, Studio Tan, Läther	Drums
Ralph Humphrey	1973, 1974, 1988, 1989, 1991, 1992, 1996, 1997, 2008	Over-Nite Sensation, Apostrophe, Roxy & Elsewhere, You Can't Do That on Stage Anymore, Vol. 1, You Can't Do That on Stage Anymore, Vol. 3, You Can't Do That on Stage Anymore, Vol. 4, You Can't Do That on Stage Anymore, Vol. 6, The Lost Episodes, Läther, Have I Offended Someone?, One Shot Deal	Drums
Huun-Huur-Tu	1994	Civilization, Phaze III	Vocals
Harry Hyams	1968	Lumpy Gravy	Viola

== I ==
Name	Year(s)	Appeared on	Instrument
Elliot Ingber	1966, 1968, 1992, 1996	Freak Out!, Lumpy Gravy, You Can't Do That on Stage Anymore, Vol. 5, The Lost Episodes	Guitar
Barbara Issak	1979	Joe's Garage	Vocals

== J ==
Name	Year(s)	Appeared on	Instrument
Fred Jackson, Jr.	1972	The Grand Wazoo	Woodwinds
Jules Jacob	1968	Lumpy Gravy	Woodwinds
Janschi	1985, 1996	The Lost Episodes	Bass
Eddie Jobson	1976–1978, 1981, 1992, 1996, 1997	Zappa in New York, Studio Tan, Shut Up 'n Play Yer Guitar, You Can't Do That on Stage Anymore, Vol. 6, Läther, Have I Offended Someone?	Keyboards, Violin, Vocals
John Johnson	1966	Freak Out!	Tuba
Plas Johnson	1966	Freak Out!	Saxophone
Pete Jolly	1968	Lumpy Gravy	Keyboards

== K ==
Name	Year(s)	Appeared on	Instrument
Armand Kaproff	1967	Absolutely Free	Cello
Carol Kaye	1966	Freak Out!	12-string guitar
Howard Kaylan	1970–1972, 1988, 1989, 1992	Chunga's Revenge, Fillmore East - June 1971, 200 Motels, Just Another Band from L.A., You Can't Do That on Stage Anymore, Vol. 1, You Can't Do That on Stage Anymore, Vol. 3, You Can't Do That on Stage Anymore, Vol. 6	Vocals, Percussions
Raymond Kelley	1966, 1968	Freak Out!, Lumpy Gravy	Cello
Gary Kellgren	1968	We're Only in It for the Money	Voice
Harold Kelling	1968	Lumpy Gravy	Voice
Mike Keneally	1988, 1991, 1992, 2006	Broadway the Hard Way, The Best Band You Never Heard in Your Life, You Can't Do That on Stage Anymore, Vol. 4, Make a Jazz Noise Here, You Can't Do That on Stage Anymore, Vol. 6, Trance-Fusion	Guitar, Keyboards, Vocals
Jerome A. Kessler	1968, 1978, 1979, 1981, 1996, 2004, 2007, 2008	Lumpy Gravy, Studio Tan, Orchestral Favorites, Tinseltown Rebellion, Läther, QuAUDIOPHILIAc, Wazoo, One Shot Deal	Cello
Kaigal-ool Khovalyg	1994	Civilization, Phaze III	Vocals
John Kilgore	1968, 1981, 1985, 1994	Lumpy Gravy, Shut Up 'n Play Yer Guitar, Frank Zappa Meets the Mothers of Prevention, Civilization, Phaze III	Voice
Pete Kleinow	1972	Waka/Jawaka	Pedal steel
Alexander Koltun	1968	Lumpy Gravy	Violin
Hermann Kretzschmar	1993, 1994, 1999	The Yellow Shark, Civilization, Phaze III, Everything Is Healing Nicely	Piano, Harpsichord, Celeste, Voice
Marty Krystall	1983	The Man from Utopia	Saxophone
Bernard Kundell	1968	Lumpy Gravy	Violin
William Kurasch	1968	Lumpy Gravy	Violin

== L ==
Name	Year(s)	Appeared on	Instrument
Ruben Ladron de Guevara	1974, 1976	Apostrophe, Roxy & Elsewhere, Zoot Allures	Vocals
Patrolman LaFamine	1996	The Lost Episodes	Voice
Ricky Lancelotti	1973, 1996	Over-Nite Sensation, The Lost Episodes, Läther	Vocals
Michael A. Lang	1968, 1978–1981, 1996, 2004, 2008	Lumpy Gravy, Studio Tan, Orchestral Favorites, Tinseltown Rebellion, Läther, QuAUDIOPHILIAc, One Shot Deal	Keyboards
Neil LeVang	1966	Freak Out!	Guitar
John Lennon	1971, 1992	Playground Psychotics	Guitar, Vocals
André Lewis	1976, 1979, 1981, 1989, 1996, 1997, 2002, 2004, 2008	Zoot Allures, Sheik Yerbouti, Shut Up 'n Play Yer Guitar, You Can't Do That on Stage Anymore, Vol. 3, You Can't Do That on Stage Anymore, Vol. 6, Läther, Frank Zappa Plays the Music of Frank Zappa: A Memorial Tribute, Have I Offended Someone?, FZ:OZ, QuAUDIOPHILIAc, One Shot Deal	Keyboards, Vocals
Mort Libov	2007	The Dub Room Special	Vocals
Martin Lickert	1971, 1992	200 Motels, Playground Psychotics	Bass, Voice
David Logeman	1981, 1989, 1991	Tinseltown Rebellion, You Are What You Is, You Can't Do That on Stage Anymore, Vol. 1, You Can't Do That on Stage Anymore, Vol. 4	Drums
Wayne Lyles	1996	The Lost Episodes	Voice

== M ==
Name	Year(s)	Appeared on	Instrument
Arthur Maebe	1966, 1968	Freak Out!, Lumpy Gravy	Brass
Elwood Madeo	1996	The Lost Episodes	Voice
Leonard Malarsky	1968	Lumpy Gravy	Violin
Al Malkin	1979, 1997	Joe's Garage, Have I Offended Someone?	Vocals
Tom Malone	1978, 1992, 1996, 1997, 2003, 2006, 2007, 2008	Zappa in New York, You Can't Do That on Stage Anymore, Vol. 6, Läther, Have I Offended Someone?, Halloween, Imaginary Diseases, Wazoo, One Shot Deal	Brass
Ed Mann	1977–1989, 1991, 1992, 1996, 1997, 2002, 2004, 2006, 2007, 2008	Zappa in New York, Sheik Yerbouti, Joe's Garage, Tinseltown Rebellion, Shut Up 'n Play Yer Guitar, You Are What You Is, Ship Arriving Too Late to Save a Drowning Witch, The Man from Utopia, Baby Snakes, London Symphony Orchestra, Vol. 1, Them or Us, Thing-Fish, Frank Zappa Meets the Mothers of Prevention, Jazz from Hell, London Symphony Orchestra, Vol. 2, Guitar, You Can't Do That on Stage Anymore, Vol. 1, Broadway the Hard Way, You Can't Do That on Stage Anymore, Vol. 3, The Best Band You Never Heard in Your Life, You Can't Do That on Stage Anymore, Vol. 4, Make a Jazz Noise Here, You Can't Do That on Stage Anymore, Vol. 5, You Can't Do That on Stage Anymore, Vol. 6, Frank Zappa Plays the Music of Frank Zappa: A Memorial Tribute, Have I Offended Someone?, Halloween, QuAUDIOPHILIAc, Trance-Fusion, The Dub Room Special, One Shot Deal	Percussions, Vocals
Shelly Manne	1968	Lumpy Gravy	Drums
Lou Marini	1972, 1992, 1996, 1997, 2003	Zappa in New York, You Can't Do That on Stage Anymore, Vol. 6, Läther, Have I Offended Someone?, Halloween	Woodwinds
Jose Salvador Marquez	1972–1974, 1976, 1992, 1996, 1997, 2004, 2007, 2008	Waka/Jawaka, The Grand Wazoo, Over-Nite Sensation, Apostrophe, Zoot Allures, You Can't Do That on Stage Anymore, Vol. 6, The Lost Episodes, Have I Offended Someone?, QuAUDIOPHILIAc, Joe's Domage, Wazoo, One Shot Deal	Brass, Vocals
Tommy Mars	1979–1989, 1991, 1992, 1996, 1997, 2002, 2004, 2006, 2007, 2008	Sheik Yerbouti, Joe's Garage, Tinseltown Rebellion, Shut Up 'n Play Yer Guitar, You Are What You Is, Ship Arriving Too Late to Save a Drowning Witch, The Man from Utopia, Baby Snakes, Them or Us, Thing-Fish, Frank Zappa Meets the Mothers of Prevention, Uncle Meat (1987 CD Version), Jazz from Hell, Guitar, You Can't Do That on Stage Anymore, Vol. 1, You Can't Do That on Stage Anymore, Vol. 3, You Can't Do That on Stage Anymore, Vol. 4, You Can't Do That on Stage Anymore, Vol. 5, You Can't Do That on Stage Anymore, Vol. 6, The Lost Episodes, Frank Zappa Plays the Music of Frank Zappa: A Memorial Tribute, Have I Offended Someone?, Halloween, QuAUDIOPHILIAc, Trance-Fusion, Buffalo, The Dub Room Special, One Shot Deal	Keyboards, Vocals
Bobby Martin	1981–1989, 1991, 1992, 1997, 2006, 2007, 2008	Ship Arriving Too Late to Save a Drowning Witch, The Man from Utopia, Baby Snakes, Them or Us, Thing-Fish, Frank Zappa Meets the Mothers of Prevention, Does Humor Belong in Music?, Jazz from Hell, Guitar, You Can't Do That on Stage Anymore, Vol. 1, Broadway the Hard Way, You Can't Do That on Stage Anymore, Vol. 3, The Best Band You Never Heard in Your Life, You Can't Do That on Stage Anymore, Vol. 4, Make a Jazz Noise Here, You Can't Do That on Stage Anymore, Vol. 5, You Can't Do That on Stage Anymore, Vol. 6, Have I Offended Someone?, Trance-Fusion, The Dub Room Special, One Shot Deal	Keyboards, Saxophone, Vocals
Lincoln Mayorga	1968	Lumpy Gravy	Keyboards
Bill Mays	1978–1981, 1996, 2004, 2008	Studio Tan, Orchestral Favorites, Tinseltown Rebellion, Läther, QuAUDIOPHILIAc, One Shot Deal	Clavinet
Les McCann	1966	Freak Out!	Piano
Lew McCreary	1968	Lumpy Gravy	Trombone
Kurt McGettrick	1988, 1991, 1992, 2006	Broadway the Hard Way, The Best Band You Never Heard in Your Life, You Can't Do That on Stage Anymore, Vol. 4, Make a Jazz Noise Here, You Can't Do That on Stage Anymore, Vol. 6, Trance-Fusion	Saxophone
JoAnn McNab	1968, 1978–1981, 1996, 2004, 2008	Lumpy Gravy, Studio Tan, Orchestral Favorites, Tinseltown Rebellion, Läther, QuAUDIOPHILIAc, One Shot Deal	Bassoon
Malcolm McNab	1968, 1978–1981, 1996, 2004, 2006, 2008	Lumpy Gravy, Studio Tan, Orchestral Favorites, Tinseltown Rebellion, Läther, QuAUDIOPHILIAc, Joe's Domage, Imaginary Diseases, One Shot Deal	Trumpet
Edward Meares	1978, 1996	Studio Tan, Läther	Bass
Jay Migliori	1978–1981, 1996, 2004, 2007, 2008	Studio Tan, Orchestral Favorites, Tinseltown Rebellion, Läther, QuAUDIOPHILIAc, Joe's Domage, Wazoo, One Shot Deal	Clarinet, Saxophone
Todd Miller	1978–1981, 1996, 2004, 2008	Studio Tan, Orchestral Favorites, Tinseltown Rebellion, Läther, QuAUDIOPHILIAc, Joe's Domage, One Shot Deal	French horn
Catherine Milliken	1993, 1994, 1999	The Yellow Shark, Civilization, Phaze III, Everything Is Healing Nicely	Oboe, English horn, Didgeridoo, Voice
Meredith Monk	1987	Uncle Meat (1987 CD Version)	Voice
Tommy Morgan	1978–1981, 1996, 2004, 2008	Studio Tan, Orchestral Favorites, Tinseltown Rebellion, Läther, QuAUDIOPHILIAc, Joe's Domage, One Shot Deal	Harmonica
Victor Morosco	1978–1981, 1996, 2004, 2008	Studio Tan, Orchestral Favorites, Tinseltown Rebellion, Läther, QuAUDIOPHILIAc, Joe's Domage, One Shot Deal	Clarinet, Saxophone
Billy Mundi	1967–1970, 1992	Absolutely Free, We're Only in It for the Money, Uncle Meat, Burnt Weeny Sandwich, You Can't Do That on Stage Anymore, Vol. 5	Drums
Ron Myers	1996	The Lost Episodes	Trombone

== N ==
Name	Year(s)	Appeared on	Instrument
Ted Nash	1968	Lumpy Gravy	Woodwinds
Lou Anne Neill	1976, 1978–1981, 1996, 2004, 2008	Zoot Allures, Zappa in New York, Studio Tan, Orchestral Favorites, Tinseltown Rebellion, Läther, QuAUDIOPHILIAc, Joe's Domage, One Shot Deal	Harp

== O ==
Name	Year(s)	Appeared on	Instrument
Patrick O'Hearn	1978–1984, 1988, 1991, 1992, 1996, 1997, 2003, 2004, 2006, 2008	Zappa in New York, Sleep Dirt, Sheik Yerbouti, Joe's Garage, Tinseltown Rebellion, Shut Up 'n Play Yer Guitar, Ship Arriving Too Late to Save a Drowning Witch, Baby Snakes, Them or Us, You Can't Do That on Stage Anymore, Vol. 1, You Can't Do That on Stage Anymore, Vol. 4, You Can't Do That on Stage Anymore, Vol. 6, Läther, Frank Zappa Plays the Music of Frank Zappa: A Memorial Tribute, Have I Offended Someone?, Halloween, QuAUDIOPHILIAc, Trance-Fusion, One Shot Deal	Bass, Vocals
David Ocker	1976, 1981, 1983, 1984, 2004	Sheik Yerbouti, You Are What You Is, London Symphony Orchestra, Vol. 1, Francesco Zappa, London Symphony Orchestra, Vol. 2, QuAUDIOPHILIAc	Clarinet, Synclavier
Lady Bianca Odin	1991, 1992, 2009	You Can't Do That on Stage Anymore, Vol. 4, You Can't Do That on Stage Anymore, Vol. 6, Philly '76	Vocals and Keyboard
Lucy Offerall	1987	Uncle Meat (1987 CD Version)	Voice
Rumi Ogawa-Helferich	1993, 1994, 1999	The Yellow Shark, Civilization, Phaze III, Everything Is Healing Nicely	Percussions, Vocals
Franck Ollu	1993, 1994, 1999	The Yellow Shark, Civilization, Phaze III, Everything Is Healing Nicely	Brass, Voice
Yoko Ono	1971, 1992	Playground Psychotics	Vocals
Tony Ortega	1972, 2004	The Grand Wazoo, Joe's Domage	Woodwinds
Shuggie Otis	1969	Hot Rats	Bass
Charles M. Owens	1972, 2007	Wazoo	Woodwinds

== P ==
Name	Year(s)	Appeared on	Instrument
Les Papp	2005	Joe's XMASage	Drums
Don Pardo	1978, 1996	Zappa in New York, Läther	Narration
Linda Sue Parker	1976, 1997	Zoot Allures, Have I Offended Someone?	Vocals
Dave Parlato	1976, 1978, 1979, 1981, 1996, 2004, 2006, 2007, 2008	Zoot Allures, Studio Tan, Sleep Dirt, Orchestral Favorites, Tinseltown Rebellion, Läther, Frank Zappa Plays the Music of Frank Zappa: A Memorial Tribute, QuAUDIOPHILIAc, Imaginary Diseases, Wazoo, One Shot Deal	Bass
Marty Perellis	1989	You Can't Do That on Stage Anymore, Vol. 3	Voice
Richard Perissi	1968	Lumpy Gravy	French horn
Joel Peskin	1972	Waka/Jawaka, The Grand Wazoo	Woodwinds
Kris Peterson	1972	Waka/Jawaka	Vocals
Charlie Phillips	1968	Lumpy Gravy	Voice
Mark Pinske	1981	You Are What You Is	Voice
Jim Pons	1971, 1988, 1989, 1991, 1992	Fillmore East - June 1971, 200 Motels, Just Another Band from L.A., You Can't Do That on Stage Anymore, Vol. 1, You Can't Do That on Stage Anymore, Vol. 3, You Can't Do That on Stage Anymore, Vol. 6, Playground Psychotics	Bass, Vocals
Jean-Luc Ponty	1969, 1973, 1974, 1981, 1992, 1996, 2008	Hot Rats, Over-Nite Sensation, Apostrophe, Shut Up 'n Play Yer Guitar, You Can't Do That on Stage Anymore, Vol. 6, The Lost Episodes, One Shot Deal	Violin
Thomas Poole	1968	Lumpy Gravy	Percussions
Lisa Popeil	1982, 1992	Ship Arriving Too Late to Save a Drowning Witch, You Can't Do That on Stage Anymore, Vol. 6	Vocals
Roy Poper	1978–1981, 1996, 2004, 2008	Studio Tan, Orchestral Favorites, Tinseltown Rebellion, Läther, QuAUDIOPHILIAc, Joe's Domage, One Shot Deal	Trumpet
Don Preston	1967–1974, 1988, 1989, 1991, 1992, 1993, 1996, 2004	Absolutely Free, We're Only in It for the Money, Cruising with Ruben & the Jets, Uncle Meat, Burnt Weeny Sandwich, Weasels Ripped My Flesh, Fillmore East - June 1971, Just Another Band from L.A., Waka/Jawaka, The Grand Wazoo, Roxy & Elsewhere, You Can't Do That on Stage Anymore, Vol. 1, You Can't Do That on Stage Anymore, Vol. 3, You Can't Do That on Stage Anymore, Vol. 4, You Can't Do That on Stage Anymore, Vol. 5, You Can't Do That on Stage Anymore, Vol. 6, Playground Psychotics, Ahead of Their Time, The Lost Episodes, QuAUDIOPHILIAc	Keyboards, Vocals
George F. Price	1966, 1968	Freak Out!, Lumpy Gravy	French horn

== R ==
Name	Year(s)	Appeared on	Instrument
Tom Raney	1978–1981, 1996, 2004, 2008	Studio Tan, Orchestral Favorites, Tinseltown Rebellion, Läther, QuAUDIOPHILIAc, Joe's Domage, One Shot Deal	Percussions
Michael Rapaport	1994	Civilization, Phaze III	Voice
Mac Rebennack	1966	Freak Out!	Piano
Ray Reed	1978–1981, 1996, 2004, 2008	Studio Tan, Orchestral Favorites, Tinseltown Rebellion, Läther, QuAUDIOPHILIAc, Joe's Domage, One Shot Deal	Woodwinds
Kurt Reher	1966	Freak Out!	Cello
Jerome J. Reisler	1968	Lumpy Gravy	Violin
Emil Richards	1968, 1978–1981, 1996, 2004, 2008	Lumpy Gravy, Studio Tan, Orchestral Favorites, Tinseltown Rebellion, Läther, QuAUDIOPHILIAc, Joe's Domage, One Shot Deal	Percussions
Lyle Ritz	1968	Lumpy Gravy	Bass
Trefoni Rizzi	1968	Lumpy Gravy	Guitar
Tony Rodriquenz	1996	The Lost Episodes	Saxophone
Rainer Römer	1993, 1994, 1999	The Yellow Shark, Civilization, Phaze III, Everything Is Healing Nicely	Percussions
Linda Ronstadt	1987	Uncle Meat (1987 CD Version)	Voice
John Rotella	1966–1968, 1972, 1978, 1996	Freak Out!, Absolutely Free, Lumpy Gravy, The Grand Wazoo, Studio Tan, Läther	Woodwinds
Alan Rubin	2003	Halloween	Trumpet
Jürgen Ruck	1993, 1994, 1999	The Yellow Shark, Civilization, Phaze III, Everything Is Healing Nicely	Guitar, Banjo
Peter Rundel	1993, 1994, 1999	The Yellow Shark, Civilization, Phaze III, Everything Is Healing Nicely	Violin

== S ==
Name	Year(s)	Appeared on	Instrument
Claudia Sack	1993, 1999	The Yellow Shark, Everything Is Healing Nicely	Violin
Bobby Saldana	2005	Joe's XMASage	Bass
Dave Samuels	1976, 1978, 1992, 1996, 1997	Zappa in New York, You Can't Do That on Stage Anymore, Vol. 6, Läther, Have I Offended Someone?	Percussions
Sheldon Sanov	1978, 1996	Studio Tan, Läther	Violin
Emmet Sargeant	1966	Freak Out!	Cello
Lewis Saul	1989	You Can't Do That on Stage Anymore, Vol. 3	Voice
Joseph Saxon	1966, 1968	Freak Out!, Lumpy Gravy	Cello
Ralph Schaeffer	1968	Lumpy Gravy	Violin
Jürgen Ruck	1993, 1994, 1999	The Yellow Shark, Civilization, Phaze III, Everything Is Healing Nicely	Bassoon
Leonard Selic	1968	Lumpy Gravy	Viola
Ron Selico	1969	Hot Rats	Drums
Lakshminarayana Shankar	1992, 1999, 2003	You Can't Do That on Stage Anymore, Vol. 6, Everything Is Healing Nicely, Halloween	Violin
Sidney "Sid" Sharp	1968	We're Only in It for the Money, Lumpy Gravy	Conductor
Archie Shepp	1991	You Can't Do That on Stage Anymore, Vol. 4	Saxophone
Kay Sherman	2005	Joe's XMASage	Voice
Jim Sherwood	1966–1970, 1981, 1984, 1988, 1991, 1992, 1993, 1994, 1996	Freak Out!, We're Only in It for the Money, Lumpy Gravy, Cruising with Ruben & the Jets, Uncle Meat, Burnt Weeny Sandwich, Weasels Ripped My Flesh, You Are What You Is, Thing-Fish, You Can't Do That on Stage Anymore, Vol. 1, You Can't Do That on Stage Anymore, Vol. 4, You Can't Do That on Stage Anymore, Vol. 5, Ahead of Their Time, Civilization, Phaze III, Läther	Saxophone, Percussions, Vocals
David Shostac	1978–1981, 1996, 2004, 2008	Studio Tan, Orchestral Favorites, Tinseltown Rebellion, Läther, QuAUDIOPHILIAc, Joe's Domage, One Shot Deal	Flute, Saxophone
Kenneth Shroyer	1968, 1972, 1978, 1979, 1981, 1996, 2004, 2007, 2008	Lumpy Gravy, Waka/Jawaka, The Grand Wazoo, Studio Tan, Orchestral Favorites, Tinseltown Rebellion, Läther, QuAUDIOPHILIAc, Joe's Domage, Wazoo, One Shot Deal	Brass
Jeff Simmons	1970, 1972, 1974, 1988, 1992	Chunga's Revenge, Waka/Jawaka, Roxy & Elsewhere, You Can't Do That on Stage Anymore, Vol. 1, You Can't Do That on Stage Anymore, Vol. 6, Playground Psychotics	Guitar, Bass, Vocals
Mark Simone	2003	Halloween	Voice
Linda Sims	1973, 1974, 1997	Over-Nite Sensation, Apostrophe, Roxy & Elsewhere, Have I Offended Someone?	Vocals
Daryl Smith	1993, 1994, 1999	The Yellow Shark, Civilization, Phaze III, Everything Is Healing Nicely	Tuba, Voice
Paul Smith	1968	Lumpy Gravy	Keyboards
Marshall Sosson	1967	Absolutely Free	Violin
Craig Steward	1979, 1981, 1983	Joe's Garage, You Are What You Is, The Man from Utopia	Harmonica
Sting	1988	Broadway the Hard Way	Vocals
Sheridan Stokes	1978–1981, 1996, 2004, 2008	Studio Tan, Orchestral Favorites, Tinseltown Rebellion, Läther, QuAUDIOPHILIAc, Joe's Domage, One Shot Deal	Flute, Saxophone
Wolfgang Stryi	1993, 1994, 1999	The Yellow Shark, Civilization, Phaze III, Everything Is Healing Nicely	Woodwinds
Stumuk	1979, 1987	Joe's Garage, Uncle Meat (1987 CD Version)	Saxophone, Voice
Hilary Sturt	1993, 1994, 1999	The Yellow Shark, Civilization, Phaze III, Everything Is Healing Nicely	Viola, Voice
Mike Svoboda	1993, 1994, 1999	The Yellow Shark, Civilization, Phaze III, Everything Is Healing Nicely	Trombone, Euphonium, Didgeridoo, Alphorn, Conch, Voice

== T ==
Name	Year(s)	Appeared on	Instrument
Ernie Tack	1972	The Grand Wazoo	Brass
Mathias Tacke	1993, 1994, 1999	The Yellow Shark, Civilization, Phaze III, Everything Is Healing Nicely	Violin
Thomas J. Tedesco	1968	Lumpy Gravy	Guitar
Detlef Tewes	1993, 1994, 1999	The Yellow Shark, Civilization, Phaze III, Everything Is Healing Nicely	Mandolin
Chester Thompson	1974–1975, 1978, 1979, 1988, 1989, 1991, 1996, 2004, 2007, 2008	Roxy & Elsewhere, One Size Fits All, Bongo Fury, Studio Tan, Sleep Dirt, You Can't Do That on Stage Anymore, Vol. 1, You Can't Do That on Stage Anymore, Vol. 2, You Can't Do That on Stage Anymore, Vol. 3, You Can't Do That on Stage Anymore, Vol. 4, The Lost Episodes, Läther, Frank Zappa Plays the Music of Frank Zappa: A Memorial Tribute, QuAUDIOPHILIAc, The Dub Room Special, One Shot Deal	Drums
Randy Thornton	1976, 1997, 2004	Sheik Yerbouti, Have I Offended Someone?, QuAUDIOPHILIAc	Vocals
Scott Thunes	1981–1989, 1991, 1992, 1997, 2002, 2006, 2007, 2008	Ship Arriving Too Late to Save a Drowning Witch, The Man from Utopia, Them or Us, Thing-Fish, Frank Zappa Meets the Mothers of Prevention, Does Humor Belong in Music?, Uncle Meat (1987 CD Version), Jazz from Hell, Guitar, You Can't Do That on Stage Anymore, Vol. 1, Broadway the Hard Way, You Can't Do That on Stage Anymore, Vol. 3, The Best Band You Never Heard in Your Life, You Can't Do That on Stage Anymore, Vol. 4, Make a Jazz Noise Here, You Can't Do That on Stage Anymore, Vol. 5, You Can't Do That on Stage Anymore, Vol. 6, Have I Offended Someone?, Trance-Fusion, The Dub Room Special, One Shot Deal	Bass, Keyboards, Vocals
Gilma Townley	1968, 1994	Lumpy Gravy, Civilization, Phaze III	Voice
John Townley	1968	Lumpy Gravy	Voice
Bobby Tricarico	1978–1981, 1996, 2004, 2008	Studio Tan, Orchestral Favorites, Tinseltown Rebellion, Läther, QuAUDIOPHILIAc, Joe's Domage, One Shot Deal	Bassoon
Arthur Dyer Tripp III	1968–1970, 1988, 1991, 1992, 1993, 1996	Cruising with Ruben & the Jets, Uncle Meat, Burnt Weeny Sandwich, Weasels Ripped My Flesh, You Can't Do That on Stage Anymore, Vol. 1, You Can't Do That on Stage Anymore, Vol. 4, You Can't Do That on Stage Anymore, Vol. 5, Ahead of Their Time, The Lost Episodes	Drums, Percussions, Voice
Tina Turner	1973, 1974, 1997, 2016	Over-Nite Sensation, Apostrophe, Have I Offended Someone?, Crux Of The Biscuit	Vocals (Originally uncredited at the insistence of Ike Turner)

== U ==
Name	Year(s)	Appeared on	Instrument
Ian Underwood	1968–1976, 1988, 1989, 1991, 1992, 1993, 1996, 2004, 2007, 2008	We're Only in It for the Money, Cruising with Ruben & the Jets, Uncle Meat, Hot Rats, Burnt Weeny Sandwich, Weasels Ripped My Flesh, Chunga's Revenge, Fillmore East - June 1971, 200 Motels, Just Another Band from L.A., Over-Nite Sensation, Apostrophe, Zoot Allures, You Can't Do That on Stage Anymore, Vol. 1, You Can't Do That on Stage Anymore, Vol. 3, You Can't Do That on Stage Anymore, Vol. 4, You Can't Do That on Stage Anymore, Vol. 5, You Can't Do That on Stage Anymore, Vol. 6, Playground Psychotics, Ahead of Their Time, The Lost Episodes, QuAUDIOPHILIAc, Joe's Domage, Wazoo, One Shot Deal	Woodwinds, Keyboards, Synthesizer, Guitar, Vocals
Ruth Underwood	1969–1979, 1984, 1988, 1989, 1991, 1992, 1996, 1997, 2007, 2008	Uncle Meat, Burnt Weeny Sandwich, 200 Motels, Over-Nite Sensation, Apostrophe, Roxy & Elsewhere, One Size Fits All, Zoot Allures, Zappa in New York, Studio Tan, Sleep Dirt, Thing-Fish, You Can't Do That on Stage Anymore, Vol. 1, You Can't Do That on Stage Anymore, Vol. 2, You Can't Do That on Stage Anymore, Vol. 3, You Can't Do That on Stage Anymore, Vol. 4, You Can't Do That on Stage Anymore, Vol. 6, The Lost Episodes, Läther, Have I Offended Someone?, The Dub Room Special, Wazoo, One Shot Deal	Percussions, Synthesizer

== V ==
Name	Year(s)	Appeared on	Instrument
Steve Vai	1981–1989, 1991, 1992, 1997, 2006, 2007, 2008	Tinseltown Rebellion, Shut Up 'n Play Yer Guitar, You Are What You Is, Ship Arriving Too Late to Save a Drowning Witch, The Man from Utopia, Them or Us, Thing-Fish, Frank Zappa Meets the Mothers of Prevention, Jazz from Hell, Guitar, You Can't Do That on Stage Anymore, Vol. 1, You Can't Do That on Stage Anymore, Vol. 3, You Can't Do That on Stage Anymore, Vol. 4, You Can't Do That on Stage Anymore, Vol. 5, You Can't Do That on Stage Anymore, Vol. 6, Have I Offended Someone?, Imaginary Diseases, Buffalo, The Dub Room Special, One Shot Deal	Guitar, Vocals
David Van Asch	1971	200 Motels	Conductor
Don Van Vliet	1969, 1975, 1976, 1978, 1984, 1991, 1996	Hot Rats, One Size Fits All, Bongo Fury, Zoot Allures, Orchestral Favorites, Thing-Fish, You Can't Do That on Stage Anymore, Vol. 4, The Lost Episodes	Harmonica, Saxophone, Vocals
Jeannie Vassoir	1966	Freak Out!	Voice
Kin Vassy	1973, 1997	Over-Nite Sensation, Have I Offended Someone?	Vocals
Henry Vestine	2004	Joe's Corsage	Guitar
Alfred Viola	1968	Lumpy Gravy	Guitar
Mark Volman	1970–1972, 1988, 1989, 1992	Chunga's Revenge, Fillmore East - June 1971, 200 Motels, Just Another Band from L.A., You Can't Do That on Stage Anymore, Vol. 1, You Can't Do That on Stage Anymore, Vol. 3, You Can't Do That on Stage Anymore, Vol. 6, Playground Psychotics	Vocals, Percussions, Guitar

== W ==
Name	Year(s)	Appeared on	Instrument
Chad Wackerman	1981–1989, 1991, 1992, 1996, 1997, 2006, 2007, 2008	Ship Arriving Too Late to Save a Drowning Witch, The Man from Utopia, London Symphony Orchestra, Vol. 1, Them or Us, Thing-Fish, We're Only in It for the Money (1985 Remix), Cruising with Ruben & the Jets (1985 Remix), Frank Zappa Meets the Mothers of Prevention, Does Humor Belong in Music?, Uncle Meat (1987 CD Version), Jazz from Hell, London Symphony Orchestra, Vol. 2, Guitar, You Can't Do That on Stage Anymore, Vol. 1, Broadway the Hard Way, You Can't Do That on Stage Anymore, Vol. 3, The Best Band You Never Heard in Your Life, You Can't Do That on Stage Anymore, Vol. 4, Make a Jazz Noise Here, Uncle Meat (1991 CD Version), You Can't Do That on Stage Anymore, Vol. 5, You Can't Do That on Stage Anymore, Vol. 6, Läther, Have I Offended Someone?, Trance-Fusion, The Dub Room Special, One Shot Deal	Drums, Percussions
Don Waldrop	1978–1981, 1996, 2004, 2008	Studio Tan, Orchestral Favorites, Tinseltown Rebellion, Läther, QuAUDIOPHILIAc, Joe's Domage, One Shot Deal	Brass
Nelcy Walker	1969	Uncle Meat	Vocals
Denny Walley	1975–1988, 1991, 1992, 1997, 2003, 2006, 2008	Bongo Fury, Joe's Garage, Tinseltown Rebellion, Shut Up 'n Play Yer Guitar, You Are What You Is, Thing-Fish, Guitar, You Can't Do That on Stage Anymore, Vol. 1, You Can't Do That on Stage Anymore, Vol. 4, You Can't Do That on Stage Anymore, Vol. 6, Have I Offended Someone?, Halloween, Trance-Fusion, One Shot Deal	Guitar, Vocals
Caronga Ward	1996	The Lost Episodes	Bass
Johnny "Guitar" Watson	1975, 1984, 1985, 1997	One Size Fits All, Them or Us, Thing-Fish, Frank Zappa Meets the Mothers of Prevention, Have I Offended Someone?	Guitar, Vocals
Kenneth Watson	1966, 1968	Freak Out!, Lumpy Gravy	Percussions
Ernie Watts	1972	The Grand Wazoo	Saxophone
Ellen Wegner	1993, 1999	The Yellow Shark, Everything Is Healing Nicely	Harp
David Wells	1966	Freak Out!	Trombone
Becky Wentworth	1968, 1994	Lumpy Gravy, Civilization, Phaze III	Voice
A. West	1991	The Best Band You Never Heard in Your Life	Voice
Robert West	1968	Lumpy Gravy	Bass
Ray White	1976–1989, 1991, 1992, 1996, 1997, 2006, 2007, 2008	Zappa in New York, Tinseltown Rebellion, Shut Up 'n Play Yer Guitar, You Are What You Is, Ship Arriving Too Late to Save a Drowning Witch, The Man from Utopia, Them or Us, Thing-Fish, Frank Zappa Meets the Mothers of Prevention, Does Humor Belong in Music?, Jazz from Hell, Guitar, You Can't Do That on Stage Anymore, Vol. 1, You Can't Do That on Stage Anymore, Vol. 3, You Can't Do That on Stage Anymore, Vol. 4, You Can't Do That on Stage Anymore, Vol. 5, You Can't Do That on Stage Anymore, Vol. 6, The Lost Episodes, Läther, Have I Offended Someone?, Trance-Fusion, Buffalo, The Dub Room Special, One Shot Deal	Guitar, Vocals
Dietmar Wiesner	1993, 1994, 1999	The Yellow Shark, Civilization, Phaze III, Everything Is Healing Nicely	Flutes
Ueli Wiget	1993, 1994, 1999	The Yellow Shark, Civilization, Phaze III, Everything Is Healing Nicely	Keyboards, Harp
Chuck Wild	1984	Thing-Fish	Piano
Kenny Williams	1996	The Lost Episodes	Vocals
Ronald Lloyd Williams	1968, 1996	We're Only in It for the Money, Lumpy Gravy, The Lost Episodes	Vocals
Ike Willis	1978–1989, 1991, 1992, 1996, 1997, 2003, 2006, 2007, 2008	Joe's Garage, Tinseltown Rebellion, Shut Up 'n Play Yer Guitar, You Are What You Is, Ship Arriving Too Late to Save a Drowning Witch, The Man from Utopia, Them or Us, Thing-Fish, Frank Zappa Meets the Mothers of Prevention, Does Humor Belong in Music?, Guitar, You Can't Do That on Stage Anymore, Vol. 1, Broadway the Hard Way, You Can't Do That on Stage Anymore, Vol. 3, The Best Band You Never Heard in Your Life, You Can't Do That on Stage Anymore, Vol. 4, Make a Jazz Noise Here, You Can't Do That on Stage Anymore, Vol. 6, The Lost Episodes, Have I Offended Someone?, Halloween, Trance-Fusion, Buffalo, One Shot Deal	Guitar, Effects, Vocals
Debbie Wilson	1973, 1974, 1997	Over-Nite Sensation, Apostrophe, Roxy & Elsewhere, Have I Offended Someone?	Vocals
Terry Wimberly	1996	The Lost Episodes	Voice
Albert Wing	1988, 1991, 1992, 2006	Broadway the Hard Way, The Best Band You Never Heard in Your Life, You Can't Do That on Stage Anymore, Vol. 4, Make a Jazz Noise Here, You Can't Do That on Stage Anymore, Vol. 6, Trance-Fusion	Saxophone
John Winter	1978–1981, 1996, 2004, 2008	Studio Tan, Orchestral Favorites, Tinseltown Rebellion, Läther, QuAUDIOPHILIAc, Joe's Domage, One Shot Deal	Oboe, English horn
John Wittenberg	1978–1981, 1996, 2004, 2008	Studio Tan, Orchestral Favorites, Tinseltown Rebellion, Läther, QuAUDIOPHILIAc, Joe's Domage, One Shot Deal	Violin
Peter Wolf	1977–1983, 1988, 1989, 1991, 1992, 1996, 1997, 2003, 2004, 2006, 2007	Sheik Yerbouti, Joe's Garage, Tinseltown Rebellion, Shut Up 'n Play Yer Guitar, Baby Snakes, Guitar, You Can't Do That on Stage Anymore, Vol. 1, You Can't Do That on Stage Anymore, Vol. 4, You Can't Do That on Stage Anymore, Vol. 6, Frank Zappa Plays the Music of Frank Zappa: A Memorial Tribute, Have I Offended Someone?, Halloween, QuAUDIOPHILIAc, Trance-Fusion, One Shot Deal	Keyboards
Lauren Wood	1972	The Grand Wazoo	Vocals
Paul Woods	2005	Joe's XMASage	Bass

== Y ==
Name	Year(s)	Appeared on	Instrument
James "Bird Legs" Youman	1975, 1978, 1979, 1996	One Size Fits All, Studio Tan, Sleep Dirt, Läther	Bass, Guitar
Graham Young	1978, 1996	Studio Tan, Läther	Trumpet

== Z ==
Name	Year(s)	Appeared on	Instrument
Ahmet Zappa	1981	You Are What You Is	Vocals
Bobby Zappa	1996	The Lost Episodes	Guitar
Carl Zappa	1987	Uncle Meat (1987 CD Version)	Voice
Dweezil Zappa	1984–1986, 1989, 1994	Them or Us, Frank Zappa Meets the Mothers of Prevention, Does Humor Belong in Music?, You Can't Do That on Stage Anymore, Vol. 3, Civilization, Phaze III	Guitar, Voice
Moon Unit Zappa	1981–1985, 1994, 1997	You Are What You Is, Ship Arriving Too Late to Save a Drowning Witch, Them or Us, Frank Zappa Meets the Mothers of Prevention, Civilization, Phaze III, Have I Offended Someone?	Vocals
Allan Zavod	1984, 1986, 1988, 1989, 1991, 1992, 1997, 2006	Does Humor Belong in Music?, Guitar, You Can't Do That on Stage Anymore, Vol. 1, You Can't Do That on Stage Anymore, Vol. 3, You Can't Do That on Stage Anymore, Vol. 4, You Can't Do That on Stage Anymore, Vol. 6, Have I Offended Someone?, Trance-Fusion	Keyboards
Michael Zearott	1978–1981, 1996, 2004, 2008	Studio Tan, Orchestral Favorites, Tinseltown Rebellion, Läther, QuAUDIOPHILIAc, Joe's Domage, One Shot Deal	Piano, Conductor
Tibor Zelig	1968	Lumpy Gravy	Violin
Bob Zimmitti	1972	The Grand Wazoo	Percussions
James C. Zito	1968	Lumpy Gravy	Trumpet
