= Wazoo (album) =

Live album by Frank Zappa
- Released: October 30, 2007
- Recorded: September 24, 1972
- Venues: Music Hall (Boston, Massachusetts)
- Genres: Jazz fusion; big band
- Length: 96:05; 51:35 (Disc 1); 44:30 (Disc 2)
- Label: Vaulternative
- Producer: Frank Zappa

Frank Zappa chronology
The Dub Room Special (2007)	Wazoo (2007)	One Shot Deal (2008)

Professional ratings
Review scores
Source	Rating
AllMusic	4/5 stars
Rolling Stone	4/5 stars

Wazoo is a live album by Frank Zappa, posthumously released in October 2007 as a 2-CD set consisting of the complete concert given by "The Mothers of Invention/Hot Rats/Grand Wazoo" 20-piece big band on September 24, 1972 at the Music Hall, Boston, Massachusetts, United States. It is the third installment on the Vaulternative Records label that is dedicated to the posthumous release of complete Zappa concerts, following the releases of FZ:OZ (2002) and Buffalo (2007).

== Overview ==
It is the last concert of a brief series of shows that marked Zappa's return to the stage after his forced temporary retirement from the touring scene due to the injuries he suffered from an assault during a concert at the Rainbow Theatre in London on December 10, 1971.

The material showcases Zappa's endeavors in jazz-based music, and many of the compositions were featured on the 1972 studio albums The Grand Wazoo and Waka/Jawaka and on the 1978 studio album Studio Tan. Rehearsals leading to these albums and concerts are documented on Joe's Domage (2004), while Imaginary Diseases (2006) presents live recordings with a stripped-down version of the big band named 'Petit Wazoo'.

== Production ==
=== Sleeve design ===
The album cover is a visual parody of Slave Market with the Disappearing Bust of Voltaire, by Salvador Dalí. Frank Zappa's face replaces that of Voltaire's in the original, among other changes.

== Track listing ==
All tracks are written by Frank Zappa.

Disc one
No.	Title	Length
1.	"Intro Intros"	3:19
2.	"The Grand Wazoo (Think It Over)"	21:17
3.	"Approximate"	14:35
4.	"Big Swifty"	11:49

Disc two
No.	Title	Length
1.	"Ulterior Motive"	3:19
2.	"The Adventures of Greggery Peccary: Movement I – 4:50; Movement II – 9:07; Movement III – 12:33; Movement IV - The New Brown Clouds - 7:35"	32:37
3.	"Penis Dimension"	3:35
4.	"Variant I Processional March"	3:28

At the concert, "Big Swifty" was played between "The Adventures of Greggery Peccary" and "Penis Dimension".

== Personnel ==
The Mothers of Invention / Hot Rats / Grand Wazoo:

- Frank Zappa – guitar and white stick with cork handle
- Tony Duran – slide guitar
- Ian Underwood – electric piano and synthesizer
- Jerry Kessler – electric cello
- Dave Parlato – bass
- Tom Raney – vibes and electric percussion
- Ruth Underwood – marimba and electric percussion
- Jim Gordon – acoustic & electric drums
- Mike Altshul – piccolo flute, bass clarinet and other winds
- Jay Migliori – flute, tenor sax and other winds
- Earl Dumler – oboe, contrabass sarrusophone and other winds
- Ray Reed – clarinet, tenor sax and other winds
- Charles Owens – soprano sax, alto sax and other winds
- Joann McNab – bassoon
- Malcolm McNab – trumpet in D
- Sal Marquez – trumpet in B^{b}
- Tom Malone – trumpet in B^{b}, also tuba
- Bruce Fowler – trombone of the upper atmosphere
- Glenn Ferris – trombone and euphonium
- Kenny Shroyer – trombone and baritone horn
