= Barking Pumpkin Records discography =

Barking Pumpkin is an American independent record label founded by Frank Zappa in 1981 with initial distribution by CBS Records. Some releases on the label were sold only by mail order.

The catalog has included The Old Masters box sets, which consisted of boxed reissues of albums previously released by Zappa on other labels and original material by Frank Zappa which has since been nationally released by Rykodisc in different versions, as well as original and reissued by other artists, such as Dweezil Zappa and the group Z, which consisted of Dweezil and Ahmet Zappa. After Frank Zappa died in 1993, Barking Pumpkin continued to release his posthumous albums, and new content by Z.

== Catalog ==
Year	Artist	Title	Peak chart positions			RIAA Certification (sales thresholds)
Year	Artist	Title	US	US Indie	US Heat	RIAA Certification (sales thresholds)
1981	Frank Zappa	Tinsel Town Rebellion	#66			
1981	Frank Zappa	Shut Up 'N Play Yer Guitar				
1981	Frank Zappa	You Are What You Is	#93			
1982	Frank Zappa	Ship Arriving Too Late To Save A Drowning Witch	#23			
1983	Frank Zappa	The Man From Utopia	#153			
1983	Frank Zappa	Baby Snakes				
1983	Frank Zappa	London Symphony Orchestra, Vol. I				
1984	Frank Zappa	Them Or Us				
1984	Frank Zappa	Thing-Fish				
1984	Frank Zappa	Francesco Zappa				
1985	Frank Zappa	The Old Masters				
1985	Frank Zappa	Frank Zappa Meets The Mothers Of Prevention	#153			
1986	Dweezil Zappa	Havin' a Bad Day				
1986	Frank Zappa	The Old Masters II				
1986	Frank Zappa	Jazz from Hell				
1987	Frank Zappa	London Symphony Orchestra, Vol. II				
1987	Frank Zappa	The Old Masters III				
1988	Frank Zappa	Guitar				
1988	Frank Zappa	Broadway The Hard Way				
1991	Dweezil Zappa	Confessions				
1991	Frank Zappa	The Best Band You Never Heard In Your Life				
1991	Frank Zappa	Make A Jazz Noise Here				
1992	Frank Zappa & The Mothers of Invention	Playground Psychotics				
1993	Frank Zappa	Ahead Of Their Time				
1993	Frank Zappa	The Yellow Shark				
1994	Z	Shampoohorn				
1994	Frank Zappa	Civilization Phaze III				
1996	Frank Zappa	Frank Zappa Plays the Music of Frank Zappa: A Memorial Tribute				
1999	Frank Zappa	Everything Is Healing Nicely				
2004	Frank Zappa	QuAUDIOPHILIAc				
