= Have I Offended Someone? =

Compilation album by Frank Zappa
- Released: April 8, 1997
- Recorded: 1973–1985
- Genre: Hard rock; comedy rock
- Length: 63:45
- Label: Rykodisc
- Producer: Frank Zappa

Frank Zappa chronology
| Frank Zappa Plays the Music of Frank Zappa: A Memorial Tribute (1996) | Have I Offended Someone? (1997) | Mystery Disc (1998) |

Professional ratings
Review scores
| Source | Rating |
|---|---|
| AllMusic | 4/5 stars |

Have I Offended Someone? is a compilation album featuring music by American musician Frank Zappa, and was posthumously released in 1997. As indicated by the title, it compiles a number of Zappa's songs that have gained notoriety as being particularly offensive, and often satirical or parodic. Most of the tracks on the collection were previously available on other albums, but nearly all appear here in remixed form. The live version of "Dumb All Over" is a premiere recording. The 1984 recording of "Tinsel Town Rebellion" is listed as a premiere recording, as well, though it had previously appeared in the home video release Does Humor Belong in Music?.

The cover artwork was done by Ralph Steadman. The liner notes were written by Ed Sanders.

== Track listing ==
All tracks are written by Frank Zappa, except where noted.

| No. | Title | Original release | Length |
|---|---|---|---|
| 1. | "Bobby Brown Goes Down" | Sheik Yerbouti (remixed) | 2:43 |
| 2. | "Disco Boy" | Zoot Allures (reconstructed & remixed) | 4:23 |
| 3. | "Goblin Girl" | You Are What You Is (remixed & slowed down) | 4:19 |
| 4. | "In France" | Them or Us (remixed) | 3:30 |
| 5. | "He's So Gay" | Thing-Fish (remixed) | 2:45 |
| 6. | "SEX" | The Man from Utopia | 3:44 |
| 7. | "Titties 'n Beer" | Zappa in New York (edited) | 4:37 |
| 8. | "We're Turning Again" | Frank Zappa Meets the Mothers of Prevention (remixed) | 4:56 |
| 9. | "Dumb All Over" | Previously unreleased (live) | 5:43 |
| 10. | "Catholic Girls" | Joe's Garage (edited) | 3:51 |
| 11. | "Dinah-Moe Humm" | Over-Nite Sensation (remixed & edited) | 7:14 |
| 12. | "Tinsel Town Rebellion" | Does Humor Belong in Music? | 4:24 |
| 13. | "Valley Girl" (Frank Zappa/Moon Unit Zappa) | Ship Arriving Too Late to Save a Drowning Witch | 4:50 |
| 14. | "Jewish Princess" | Sheik Yerbouti | 3:15 |
| 15. | "Yo Cats" (Frank Zappa/Tommy Mariano) | Frank Zappa Meets the Mothers of Prevention (remixed) | 3:32 |
