= Joe's Xmasage =

Compilation album by Frank Zappa
- Released: December 21, 2005
- Recorded: 1963
- Genre: Spoken word, Rock and roll
- Length: 55:33
- Label: Vaulternative
- Producer: Joe Travers

Frank Zappa chronology
QuAUDIOPHILIAc (2004)	Joe's Xmasage (2005)	Imaginary Diseases (2006)

Professional ratings
Review scores
Source	Rating
AllMusic	3.5/5 stars

Joe's Xmasage is a compilation album featuring music recorded by Frank Zappa from 1962 to 1965. It was released in December 2005. It is the third in a series of releases put together by archivist Joe Travers which started with Joe's Corsage (2004).

The album is a mix of recordings at Pal Recording Studio (also known as Studio Z), live tracks and field recordings. It includes a much longer version of "The Uncle Frankie Show" which was originally released on the Mystery Disc.

== Track listing ==
All tracks are written by Frank Zappa.

No.	Title	Length
1.	"Mormon Xmas Dance Report"	1:51
2.	"Prelude to 'The Purse'"	2:24
3.	"Mr. Clean (Alternate Mix)"	2:04
4.	"Why Don'tcha Do Me Right?"	5:01
5.	"The Muthers/Power Trio"	3:15
6.	"The Purse"	11:38
7.	"The Moon Will Never Be the Same"	1:10
8.	"GTR Trio"	11:21
9.	"Suckit Rockit"	4:11
10.	"Mousie's First Xmas"	0:56
11.	"The Uncle Frankie Show"	11:42
