= One Shot Deal =

Live album by Frank Zappa
- Released: June 13, 2008
- Recorded: Various locations 1972–1981
- Genres: Rock, progressive rock, instrumental
- Length: 51:51
- Label: Zappa
- Producers: Gail Zappa, Frank Zappa, Joe Travers

Frank Zappa chronology
Wazoo (2007)	One Shot Deal (2008)	Joe's Menage (2008)

Professional ratings
Review scores
Source	Rating
AllMusic	4/5 stars

One Shot Deal is an album by Frank Zappa, posthumously released in June 2008.

== Overview ==
The track "Occam's Razor" is a guitar solo extract from a live version of the song "Inca Roads". The solo was used in the song "On the Bus" from the album Joe's Garage (1979). This is an example of Zappa's xenochrony technique. Tracks 3 and 9 feature the Abnuceals Emuukha Electric Symphony Orchestra.

== Track listing ==
All tracks are written by Frank Zappa, except where noted.

No.	Title	Recording date and venue.	Length
1.	"Bathtub Man" (George Duke, Napoleon Murphy Brock and Zappa)	Sep. 26, 1974 Palais des Sports, Paris, France	5:43
2.	"Space Boogers"	Nov. 8, 1974 Capitol Theatre, Passaic, New Jersey (late show)	1:24
3.	"Hermitage"	Sep. 18, 1975 Royce Hall, UCLA, Los Angeles	2:00
4.	"Trudgin' Across the Tundra"	Nov. 11, 1972 DAR Constitution Hall, Washington DC (early show)	4:01
5.	"Occam's Razor"	Mar. 21, 1979 Rhein-Neckar-Halle, Eppelheim, Germany; guitar solo from "Inca Roads"	9:11
6.	"Heidelberg"	Feb. 24, 1978 Rhein-Neckar-Halle, Eppelheim, Germany; guitar solo from "Yo' Mama"	4:46
7.	"The Illinois Enema Bandit"	Oct. 31, 1981 The Palladium, New York City (late show)	9:27
8.	"Australian Yellow Snow"	Jun. 25, 1973 Hordern Pavilion, Sydney, Australia	12:26
9.	"Rollo"	Sep. 18, 1975 Royce Hall, UCLA, Los Angeles	2:57

== Personnel ==
1. "Bathtub Man"
  - Frank Zappa – guitar
  - Napoleon Murphy Brock – vocals, saxophone
  - George Duke – keyboards, vocals
  - Tom Fowler – bass
  - Chester Thompson – drums
  - Ruth Underwood – percussion
2. "Space Boogers"
  - Frank Zappa – guitar
  - George Duke – keyboards
  - Chester Thompson – drums
3. "Hermitage"
  - Frank Zappa – guitar, composer
  - Ralph Grierson, Mike Lang, Ian Underwood – keyboards
  - Bill Mays – clavinet
  - Bobby Dubow, John Wittenberg – violin
  - Pamela Goldsmith – viola
  - Jerry Kessler – cello
  - Lou Anne Neill – harp
  - Dave Shostac – flute, tenor sax
  - Gary Foster – 2nd flute (and doubles)
  - Ray Reed – flute, alto sax
  - Vic Morosco – clarinet, alto sax
  - Jay Migliori – clarinet, tenor sax
  - Mike Altschul – bass clarinet, baritone sax
  - Earle Dumler – oboe, English horn, bass oboe
  - John Winter – oboe, English horn
  - David Sherr – 2nd oboe and tenor saxophone
  - JoAnn Caldwell – bassoon
  - Bobby Tricarico – bassoon, contra bassoon
  - Gene Goe, Malcolm McNab, Roy Poper – trumpet
  - Arthur Briegleb, David Duke, Bob Henderson, Todd Miller – French horn
  - Jock Ellis, Bruce Fowler, Kenny Shroyer – trombone
  - Dana Hughes – bass trombone
  - Don Waldrop – tuba and contrabass trombone
  - Dave Parlato – bass
  - Terry Bozzio – drums
  - Alan Estes, John Bergamo, Emil Richards, Tom Raney – percussion
4. "Trudgin' Across the Tundra"
  - Frank Zappa – conductor, guitar
  - Tony Duran – slide guitar
  - Earle Dumler – oboe, saxophone, sarrusophone
  - Malcolm McNab – trumpet
  - Gary Barone – trumpet (solo)
  - Tom Malone – trumpet, trombone, tuba, piccolo, saxophone
  - Bruce Fowler – trombone
  - Glenn Ferris – trombone
  - Dave Parlato – bass
  - Jim Gordon – drums, steel drums
5. "Occam's Razor"
  - Frank Zappa – guitar solo
  - Warren Cuccurullo – guitar
  - Denny Walley – guitar, backing vocal
  - Tommy Mars – keyboards
  - Peter Wolf – keyboards
  - Arthur Barrow – bass
  - Vinnie Colaiuta – drums
  - Ed Mann – percussion
  - Ike Willis – backing vocal
6. "Heidelberg"
  - Frank Zappa – guitar solo
  - Adrian Belew – guitar
  - Tommy Mars – keyboards
  - Peter Wolf – keyboards
  - Patrick O'Hearn – bass
  - Terry Bozzio – drums
  - Ed Mann – percussion
7. "The Illinois Enema Bandit"
  - Frank Zappa – guitar, vocals
  - Ray White – vocals, guitar
  - Steve Vai – guitar
  - Tommy Mars – keyboards
  - Robert Martin – keyboards, vocals
  - Scott Thunes – bass
  - Chad Wackerman – drums
  - Ed Mann – percussion
8. "Australian Yellow Snow"
  - Frank Zappa – guitar, vocals
  - George Duke – keyboards, vocals
  - Jean-Luc Ponty – violin
  - Ian Underwood – woodwinds, synthesizer
  - Sal Marquez – trumpet, vocals
  - Bruce Fowler – trombone
  - Tom Fowler – bass
  - Ralph Humphrey – drums
  - Ruth Underwood – percussion
9. "Rollo"
  - Same as song 3. "Hermitage"

=== Credits ===
- Bernie Grundman – mastering
- Michael Mesker – design, layout design
- Melanie Starks – production coordination
- Joe Travers – producer, vault research
- Gail Zappa – producer, package concept, text
