= The Perfect Stranger (Frank Zappa album) =

Studio album by Frank Zappa
- Released: August 23, 1984
- Recorded: January – April 1984
- Studio: IRCAM (Paris); UMRK (Los Angeles)
- Genre: Electronic; classical
- Length: 38:43
- Label: Angel
- Producer: Frank Zappa

Frank Zappa chronology
London Symphony Orchestra, Vol. 1 (1983)	The Perfect Stranger (1984)	Them or Us (1984)

Singles from The Perfect Stranger
- 1. "The Girl in the Magnesium Dress" Released: 1984

The Perfect Stranger is a 1984 album featuring the music of Frank Zappa, conducted in part by Pierre Boulez. It was originally issued on vinyl in 1984 and on CD in 1985 by Angel Records, and then in remixed and re-sequenced form on CD by Barking Pumpkin in 1992. Later reissues (of the same master) were by Rykodisc in 1995 and Zappa/Universal in 2012.

Boulez conducted three tracks ("The Perfect Stranger", "Naval Aviation in Art?" and "Dupree's Paradise"), recorded at IRCAM, Paris on January 10 and January 11, 1984, and performed by Boulez's Ensemble InterContemporain. The title track was also commissioned by Boulez, and contains references to Zappa's 1971 film, 200 Motels. The remaining four tracks are credited to 'The Barking Pumpkin Digital Gratification Consort'—in fact, Zappa's Synclavier. "Outside Now Again" is a Synclavier performance based on a transcription of Zappa's guitar solo in the song "Outside Now" from the 1979 Joe's Garage album.

The track "Jonestown" is a reference to the 1978 Jonestown massacre in Guyana, where cult leader Jim Jones drove his followers to collective suicide.

== Reception ==
Professional ratings
Review scores
Source	Rating
Allmusic	3/5 stars

== Track listing ==
All tracks are written by Frank Zappa.

Side one
No.	Title	Length
1.	"The Perfect Stranger"	12:42
2.	"Naval Aviation in Art?"	2:28
3.	"The Girl in the Magnesium Dress"	3:27
Total length:		19:43

Side two
No.	Title	Length
4.	"Outside Now Again"	4:06
5.	"Love Story"	1:00
6.	"Dupree's Paradise"	7:53
7.	"Jonestown"	7:07
Total length:		19:01

CD releases (Barking Pumpkin, Rykodisc and Zappa/Universal)
No.	Title	Length
1.	"The Perfect Stranger"	12:44
2.	"Naval Aviation in Art?"	2:45
3.	"The Girl in the Magnesium Dress"	3:13
4.	"Dupree's Paradise"	7:54
5.	"Love Story"	0:59
6.	"Outside Now Again"	4:06
7.	"Jonestown"	5:27

Different track timings are probably due to mislisting. There are no reports of tracks being longer or shorter on the original vinyl.

== Personnel ==
Per the album liner notes:

The Ensemble InterContemporain (tracks 1, 2, 4)

- Pierre Boulez – President, conductor
- Péter Eötvös – Musical Director
- Lawrence Beauregard, Sophie Cherrier – flutes
- Laszlo Hadady, Didier Pateau – oboes
- Alain Camien, Paul Meyer – clarinets
- Guy Arnaud – bass clarinet
- Jean-Marie Lamothe – bassoon
- Jacques Delepancque, Jens McManama – horns
- Antoine Curé, Jean-Jacques Gaudon – trumpets
- Jérôme Naulais, Benny Sluchin – trombones
- Gérard Buquet – tuba
- Pierre-Laurent Aimard, Alain Neveux – pianos
- Marie-Claire Jamet – harp
- Charles-André Unale, Jacques Ghestem, Maryvonne Le Dizès – violins
- Garth Knox, Jean Sulem – violas
- Chrichan Larsson, Pierre Strauch – cellos
- Frédéric Stochl – double bass
- Vincent Bauer, Michel Cerutti, Daniel Ciampolini – percussions

The Barking Pumpkin Digital Gratification Consort (tracks 3, 5–7)

- Frank Zappa – Synclavier
- David Ocker – computer programmer
- Steve DiFuria – special software

Production

- Frank Zappa – producer, liner notes
- Didier Arditi – recording engineer (tracks 1, 2, 4)
- Bob Stone – remix engineer (original release)
- Spence Chrislu – 1992 remix and EQ engineer
- John Matousek – mastering
- Don Hunstein – photography
- Donald Roller Wilson – cover painting
