= The Dub Room Special! (soundtrack) =

Live album / soundtrack album by Frank Zappa
- Released: August 24, 2007
- Recorded: August 27, 1974; October 31, 1981
- Genre: Rock
- Length: 64:28
- Label: Zappa
- Producer: Frank Zappa

Frank Zappa chronology
Buffalo (2007)	The Dub Room Special! (2007)	Wazoo (2007)

Professional ratings
Review scores
Source	Rating
Allmusic	4/5 stars

The Dub Room Special! is an album by American musician Frank Zappa, released in August 2007. It is the soundtrack for the film of the same name, and combines recordings from a TV special performance on August 27, 1974, and from two concerts in New York City on October 31, 1981. The album, originally prepared for vinyl release by Zappa, was first sold at Zappa Plays Zappa shows in the United States during August 2007. Shortly thereafter, it became available for mail order. For a limited time, each copy of the CD contained a small souvenir piece of tape from Zappa's Utility Muffin Research Kitchen studio.

== Track listing ==
All music is composed by Frank Zappa.

No.	Title	Length
1.	"A Token of My Extreme" (Vamp)	2:29
2.	"Stevie's Spanking"	5:54
3.	"The Dog Breath Variations"	1.42
4.	"Uncle Meat"	2:16
5.	"Stink-Foot"	3:58
6.	"Easy Meat"	6:51
7.	"Montana"	4:24
8.	"Inca Roads"	9:46
9.	"Room Service"	9:15
10.	"Cosmik Debris"	7:44
11.	"Florentine Pogen"	10:13
Total length:		64:28

== Personnel ==
=== Those Who Play This ===
August 1974 band (tracks 1, 3–5 and 7–11)

- FZ – guitar, vocals and percussion
- George Duke – keyboards and vocals
- Ruth Underwood – percussion
- Napoleon Murphy Brock – flute, saxophone and vocals
- Tom Fowler – bass
- Chester Thompson – drums

Halloween 1981 band (tracks 2 and 6)

- FZ – lead guitar and vocals
- Tommy Mars – keyboards and vocals
- Ed Mann – percussion and vocals
- Steve Vai – guitar and vocals
- Ray White – guitar and vocals
- Bobby Martin – keyboards, saxophone and vocals
- Scott Thunes – bass and vocals
- Chad Wackerman – drums

=== Production ===
- FZ – producer, composer, arranger, performer; mixing & editing; title script
- Ahmet Zappa – enthusiasm, insistence & thumbs up
- Dweezil Zappa – mastering session super vision & sequencing
- Joe Travers – vaultmeisterment
- Kerry McNabb, Bob Stone – FZ engineers
- Steve Hall – mastering at Future Disc, April 2003
- John Frusciante – liner notes
- GZ – liner notes; art direction & text
- Michael Mesker – package renderment
- Melanie Starks – production containment
- Eric White – "In the Dub Room" (oil on canvas)
