= Quaudiophiliac =

Compilation album by Frank Zappa
- Released: September 14, 2004
- Recorded: March 1, 1970–1978
- Genre: Rock
- Length: 50:36
- Label: Barking Pumpkin
- Producers: Frank Zappa, Dweezil Zappa

Frank Zappa chronology
Joe's Domage (2004)	Quaudiophiliac (2004)	Joe's Xmasage (2005)

Professional ratings
Review scores
Source	Rating
Allmusic	4/5 stars

Quaudiophiliac (styled QuAUDIOPHILIAc) is an album featuring music by Frank Zappa, released in DVD-Audio format by Barking Pumpkin Records in 2004. It compiles recordings he made while experimenting with quadraphonic, or four-channel, sound during the 1970s.

Zappa had previously made quadraphonic mixes for some 1970s albums for his DiscReet Records label. Both Over-Nite Sensation (1973) and Apostrophe (') (1974) were released on LP using the Quadradisc process. However, this album consists entirely of recordings that were either never previously unreleased, or previously unreleased in quadraphonic sound.

Quaudiophiliac was produced by Zappa, and completed by his son, Dweezil Zappa. "Chunga Basement", is a different version of the title track from Chunga's Revenge (1970). Also included are three tracks from the 1975 Royce Hall, UCLA concerts with the Abnuceals Emuukha Electric Orchestra which would become Orchestral Favorites (1979); plus a quad remix of a segment of Zappa's 1968 musique concrète masterpiece Lumpy Gravy. "Waka/Jawaka" is a previously unreleased four-channel mix of the title track from the 1972 album, and "Wild Love" had previously appeared in stereo on Sheik Yerbouti in 1979.

== Track listing ==
No.	Title	Length
1.	"Naval Aviation in Art?"	1:34
2.	"Lumpy Gravy"	1:05
3.	"Rollo"	6:00
4.	"Drooling Midrange Accountants on Easter Hay"	2:15
5.	"Wild Love"	4:07
6.	"Ship Ahoy"	5:47
7.	"Chunga Basement"	11:48
8.	"Venusian Time Bandits"	1:54
9.	"Waka/Jawaka"	13:23
10.	"Basement Music #2"	2:43

== Personnel ==
=== Musicians ===
- Frank Zappa – guitar, vocals, arranger, conductor
- Napoleon Murphy Brock – vocals
- Adrian Belew – guitar
- George Duke – keyboards
- Andre Lewis – keyboards
- Ian Underwood – keyboards
- Tommy Mars – keyboards, vocals
- Don Preston – Minimoog
- Max Bennett – bass guitar
- Alex Dmochowski – bass guitar
- Roy Estrada – bass guitar
- Tom Fowler – bass guitar
- Patrick O'Hearn – bass guitar
- Terry Bozzio – drums, vocals
- Aynsley Dunbar – drums
- Chester Thompson – drums
- Ed Mann – percussion
- Mike Altschul – bass clarinet, bass flute, piccolo, bass saxophone, tenor saxophone
- Sal Marquez – trumpet, flugelhorn
- Billy Byers – trombone, baritone horn
- Kenny Shroyer – trombone, baritone horn

=== Production ===
- Frank Zappa – producer, engineer, mixing
- Dweezil Zappa – producer, engineer
- Jeff Skillen – executive producer
- Gail Zappa – executive producer, art direction, photography
- Art Kelm – technical support
- Richard Landers – technical support
- Fred Maher – technical support, artist relations
- Stephen Marcussen – mastering
- Jeff Levison – production supervisor
- Jaime Ramírez – production coordination
- Joe Travers – vault research
- John "Buddy" Williams – photography, cover photo
- Keith Lawler – package layout, design, photography
