= Trance-Fusion =

Live album by Frank Zappa
- Released: October 24, 2006
- Recorded: 1977–1988
- Genre: Instrumental rock
- Length: 61:40
- Label: Zappa
- Producer: Frank Zappa

Frank Zappa chronology
The MOFO Project/Object (2006)	Trance-Fusion (2006)	Buffalo (2007)

Trance-Fusion is an album by Frank Zappa. Released posthumously in 2006, 13 years after the musician's death, the album forms the third in a trilogy of instrumental albums which focus on Zappa's improvised guitar solos, after Shut Up 'n Play Yer Guitar (1981) and Guitar (1988). Trance-Fusion was among the last albums completed by Zappa before his death, along with The Rage & The Fury: The Music Of Edgard Varèse, Dance Me This and Civilization Phaze III. It was also among the first releases by Zappa to be made available digitally via iTunes through Gail Zappa's distribution deal with Universal Music Enterprises.

== Reception ==
Professional ratings
Review scores
Source	Rating
AllMusic	4/5 stars

AllMusic wrote that Trance-Fusion "took way too long to see the light of day (and with cover art more suited to a Kitaro album), but for the FZ faithful it was worth the wait. Keep your fingers crossed for more."

== Track listing ==
All tracks are written by Frank Zappa.

No.	Title	Recording date and venue	Length
1.	"Chunga's Revenge"	Performed at Wembley Arena, London, UK: April 19, 1988. Features Dweezil Zappa	7:01
2.	"Bowling on Charen" (Originally called "The Squirm")	Guitar solo from "Wild Love", performed at The Palladium, NYC: October 28, 1977 (early show)	5:03
3.	"Good Lobna"	Guitar solo from "Let's Move to Cleveland", performed at Orpheum Theater, Memphis, Tennessee: December 4, 1984	1:39
4.	"A Cold Dark Matter"	Guitar solo from "Inca Roads", performed at Memorial Hall, Allentown, Pennsylvania: March 19, 1988	3:31
5.	"Butter or Cannons"	Guitar solo from "Let's Move to Cleveland", performed at The Pier, NYC: August 25, 1984	3:24
6.	"Ask Dr. Stupid"	Guitar solo from "Easy Meat", performed at Rhein-Neckarhalle, Eppelheim, Germany: March 21, 1979	3:20
7.	"Scratch & Sniff"	Guitar solo from "City of Tiny Lights", performed at Brighton Centre, Brighton, UK: April 16, 1988	3:56
8.	"Trance-Fusion"	Guitar solo from "Marque-Son's Chicken", performed at Liederhalle, Stuttgart, Germany: May 24, 1988	4:19
9.	"Gorgo"	Guitar solo from "The Torture Never Stops", performed at Johanneshovs Isstadion, Stockholm: May 1, 1988	2:41
10.	"Diplodocus"	Guitar solo from "King Kong", performed at Civic Center, Providence, Rhode Island: October 26, 1984	3:22
11.	"Soul Polka"	Guitar solo from "Oh No", performed at Memorial Hall, Allentown, Pennsylvania: March 19, 1988	3:17
12.	"For Giuseppe Franco"	Guitar solo from "Hot-Plate Heaven at the Green Hotel", performed at Paramount Theatre, Seattle, Washington: December 17, 1984 (late show)	3:48
13.	"After Dinner Smoker"	Guitar solo from "The Torture Never Stops", performed at Palasport, Genoa, Italy: June 9, 1988	4:45
14.	"Light Is All That Matters"	Guitar solo from "Let's Move to Cleveland", performed at Paramount Theatre, Seattle, Washington December 17, 1984 (late show)	3:46
15.	"Finding Higgs' Boson"	Guitar solo from "Hot-Plate Heaven at the Green Hotel", performed at Stadthalle, Vienna, Austria: May 8, 1988	3:41
16.	"Bavarian Sunset"	Guitar solo from post-"I Am the Walrus" jam, performed at Rudi-Sedlmeyer Sporthalle, Munich, Germany: May 9, 1988	4:00

== Personnel ==
- Frank Zappa – guitar, all tracks
- Dweezil Zappa – guitar on tracks 1 and 16
- Adrian Belew – rhythm guitar on track 2
- Warren Cuccurullo – rhythm guitar on track 6
- Mike Keneally – rhythm guitar and keyboards on tracks 1, 4, 7, 8, 9, 11, 13, 15, and 16
- Denny Walley – slide guitar on track 6
- Ray White – rhythm guitar on tracks 3, 5, 10, 12, and 14
- Ike Willis – rhythm guitar on tracks 3, 5, 10, 12, and 14
- Tommy Mars – keyboards on tracks 2 and 6
- Bobby Martin – keyboards on tracks 1, 3, 4, 5, 7, 8, 9, 10, 11, 12, 13, 14, 15, and 16
- Peter Wolf – keyboards on tracks 2 and 6
- Allan Zavod – keyboards on tracks 3, 5, 10, 12, and 14
- Scott Thunes – bass and mini-Moog on tracks 1, 3, 4, 5, 7, 8, 9, 10, 11, 12, 13, 14, 15, and 16
- Patrick O'Hearn – bass on track 2
- Arthur Barrow – bass on track 6 (uncredited in the booklet)
- Chad Wackerman – drums and percussion on tracks 1, 3, 4, 5, 7, 8, 9, 10, 11, 12, 13, 14, 15, and 16
- Terry Bozzio – drums on track 2
- Ed Mann – percussion on tracks 1, 2, 4, 6, 7, 8, 9, 11, 13, 15, and 16
- Paul Carman – alto, soprano, and baritone saxophone on tracks 1, 4, 7, 8, 9, 11, 13, 15, and 16
- Albert Wing – tenor saxophone on tracks 1, 4, 7, 8, 9, 11, 13, 15, and 16
- Kurt McGettrick – baritone, bass saxophone and contrabass clarinet on tracks 1, 4, 7, 8, 9, 11, 13, 15, and 16
- Walt Fowler – trumpet, flugelhorn and keyboards on tracks 1, 4, 7, 8, 9, 11, 13, 15, and 16
- Bruce Fowler – trombone on tracks 1, 4, 7, 8, 9, 11, 13, 15, and 16
- Vinnie Colaiuta – drums on track 6
