= London Symphony Orchestra (Zappa albums) =

Album series by Frank Zappa

London Symphony Orchestra, Vol. I

Studio album by Frank Zappa
- Released: June 9, 1983
- Recorded: January 12–14, 1983
- Studio: Twickenham Film Studios (London)
- Genre: 20th-century classical
- Length: 51:55
- Label: Barking Pumpkin
- Producer: Frank Zappa

Frank Zappa chronology
Baby Snakes (1983)	London Symphony Orchestra, Vol. I (1983)	The Perfect Stranger (1984)

Professional ratings
Review scores
Source	Rating
Allmusic	3/5 stars

London Symphony Orchestra, Vol. II

Studio album by Frank Zappa
- Released: September 17, 1987
- Recorded: January 12–14, 1983
- Studio: Twickenham Film Studios (London)
- Genre: 20th-century classical
- Length: 43:37
- Label: Barking Pumpkin
- Producer: Frank Zappa

Frank Zappa chronology
Jazz from Hell (1986)	London Symphony Orchestra, Vol. II (1987)	The Old Masters Box III (1987)

Professional ratings
Review scores
Source	Rating
Allmusic	3/5 stars

London Symphony Orchestra Vol. 1 & 2

Compilation album by Frank Zappa
- Released: April 18, 1995
- Recorded: January 12–14, 1983
- Studio: Twickenham Film Studios (London) (recording); UMRK (Los Angeles) (remix)
- Genre: 20th-century classical
- Length: 95:47
- Label: Rykodisc
- Producer: Frank Zappa

Professional ratings
Review scores
Source	Rating
Allmusic	4/5 stars

London Symphony Orchestra is a pair of albums by Frank Zappa, featuring his original symphonic compositions conducted by Kent Nagano. They were recorded at the same sessions in January 1983, and originally released as London Symphony Orchestra, Vol. I in 1983, London Symphony Orchestra, Vol. II, in 1987, and later combined and reissued on a Rykodisc CD as London Symphony Orchestra Vol. 1 & 2 in 1995.

== Background ==
Volume I features the London Symphony Orchestra performing four instrumental compositions — "Sad Jane", "Pedro's Dowry", "Envelopes", and "Mo 'n Herb's Vacation" — from sessions recorded in January 1983. The album was Zappa's second to employ a full-scale symphony orchestra, following 200 Motels (1971) with the Royal Philharmonic Orchestra. However, Zappa had previously formed a number of ad hoc orchestras to record his classical music (e.g. Lumpy Gravy 1967, Studio Tan 1978, Orchestral Favorites 1979) and big band music (e.g. The Grand Wazoo 1972).

The album was recorded using a digital 24-track Sony PCM-3324 tape recorder. It was one of the earliest digital multitrack recordings of an orchestra. By recording the orchestra with many microphones very close to the instruments the album sounds more detailed than possible with previous stereo recording techniques. Extensive use of editing was employed to fix musical mistakes.

The original vinyl LP recordings were tweaked in the studio to hide out-of-tune and wrong notes as well as to add in a sheen of reverb to further obscure parts. These audio "enhancements" were removed when the recordings were remixed for the compact disc re-issue in 1995. This version of the album was combined with London Symphony Orchestra, Vol. II (1987), and re-released on a Rykodisc CD as London Symphony Orchestra Vol. I & II.

== Track listings ==
=== Volume One ===
All tracks are written by Frank Zappa.

Side one
No.	Title	Length
1.	"Sad Jane"	10:05
2.	"Pedro's Dowry"	10:26
3.	"Envelopes"	4:11
Total length:		24:20

Side two
No.	Title	Length
4.	"Mo 'n Herb's Vacation: First Movement – 4:50; Second Movement – 10:05; Third Movement – 12:56"	27:11
Total length:		27:42

=== 1986 abridged CD ===
No.	Title	Length
1.	"Sad Jane"	9:53
2.	"Mo 'N Herb's Vacation I"	4:50
3.	"Mo 'N Herb's Vacation II"	10:04
4.	"Mo 'N Herb's Vacation III"	12:52
5.	"Bogus Pomp"	24:32

=== Volume Two ===
Side one
No.	Title	Length
1.	"Bogus Pomp"	24:32
Total length:		24:32

Side two
No.	Title	Length
2.	"Bob in Dacron"	12:12
3.	"Strictly Genteel"	6:53
Total length:		19:04

=== 1995 remixed and resequenced combined CD ===
Disc one
No.	Title	Length
1.	"Bob in Dacron, First Movement"	5:36
2.	"Bob in Dacron, Second Movement"	6:34
3.	"Sad Jane, First Movement"	4:46
4.	"Sad Jane, Second Movement"	5:04
5.	"Mo 'N Herb's Vacation, First Movement"	4:47
6.	"Mo 'N Herb's Vacation, Second Movement"	10:04
7.	"Mo 'N Herb's Vacation, Third Movement"	12:50

Disc two
No.	Title	Length
1.	"Envelopes"	4:06
2.	"Pedro's Dowry"	10:25
3.	"Bogus Pomp"	24:34
4.	"Strictly Genteel"	6:56

== Personnel ==
=== Musicians ===
- The London Symphony Orchestra conducted by Kent Nagano
- David Ocker – clarinet
- Chad Wackerman – drums
- Ed Mann – percussion

=== Production staff ===
- Frank Zappa – producer
- Mark Pinske – recording engineer
- John Vince – cover design
- James Stagnita – graphic design (Vol II)
- Mark Hanauer – cover photo (Vol II)
