= Baby Snakes (soundtrack) =

1983 soundtrack album by Frank Zappa

- 1995 and 2012 CD reissue cover depicting the front of the original picture disc

Soundtrack album by Frank Zappa
- Released: March 28, 1983
- Recorded: October 28–31, 1977
- Venue: The Palladium (New York City)
- Genre: Hard rock; progressive rock; art rock; comedy rock
- Length: 37:02
- Label: Barking Pumpkin
- Producer: Frank Zappa

Frank Zappa chronology
The Man from Utopia (1983)	Baby Snakes (1983)	London Symphony Orchestra, Vol. I (1983)

Alternate cover
- 1988 CD reissue cover

Professional ratings
Review scores
Source	Rating
AllMusic	3.5/5 stars

Baby Snakes is the soundtrack to Frank Zappa's film of the same name. It features seven songs from the film.

== Overview ==
The track "Baby Snakes" is the studio recording which appears on Sheik Yerbouti, but omits the opening riff (instead starting at the first verse). All other tracks are live recordings, unique to this album and the film.

Like the Shut Up 'n Play Yer Guitar set, this LP was originally offered for sale only as a mail order item through Columbia Records' Record Club division in Terre Haute, IN. The LP was later offered to distributors for conventional brick-and-mortar store sales.

== Track listing ==
Side one
No.	Title	Length
1.	"Baby Snakes"	1:45
2.	"Titties & Beer"	6:13
3.	"The Black Page #2"	2:50
4.	"Jones Crusher"	2:53
5.	"Disco Boy"	3:51
Total length:		18:19

Side two
No.	Title	Length
6.	"Dinah-Moe Humm"	6:37
7.	"Punky's Whips"	11:29
Total length:		18:43

CD version
No.	Title	Length
1.	"Intro Rap"	0:37
2.	"Baby Snakes"	1:46
3.	"Titties 'n' Beer"	6:13
4.	"The Black Page #2"	2:51
5.	"Jones Crusher"	2:53
6.	"Disco Boy"	3:52
7.	"Dinah Moe Humm"	6:37
8.	"Punky's Whips"	11:30
Total length:		36:19

== Credits ==
- Frank Zappa – director, keyboards, vocals, guitar
- Adrian Belew – vocals, guitar
- Tommy Mars – keyboards, vocals
- Peter Wolf – keyboards
- Patrick O'Hearn – bass guitar
- Terry Bozzio – drums, vocals on "Titties & Beer" and "Punky's Whips"
- Ed Mann – percussion

== Production ==
- Arranged & Produced by Frank Zappa
- Engineered & Mixed by Joe Chiccarelli
- Mastered by Bob Stone
- Norman Seeff – photography
- Lynn Goldsmith – photography
