= Joe's Domage =

Compilation album by Frank Zappa
- Released: October 1, 2004
- Recorded: 1972
- Genre: Jazz fusion
- Length: 55:34
- Label: Vaulternative
- Producer: Joe Travers

Frank Zappa chronology
Joe's Corsage (2004)	Joe's Domage (2004)	QuAUDIOPHILIAc (2004)

Professional ratings
Review scores
Source	Rating
Allmusic	4/5 stars

Joe's Domage is an album featuring a portion of the rehearsal tape for the album Waka/Jawaka (1972) by Frank Zappa, posthumously released in October 2004. It is the second in a series of releases put together by archivist Joe Travers which started with Joe's Corsage (2004).

== Track listing ==
All tracks are written by Frank Zappa.

No.	Title	Length
1.	"When it's perfect..."	3:18
2.	"The New Brown Clouds"	2:44
3.	"Frog Song"	17:23
4.	"It Just Might Be a One Shot Deal"	1:57
5.	"The ending line..."	3:12
6.	"Blessed Relief/The New Brown Clouds"	5:03
7.	"It Ain't Real So What's the Deal"	13:14
8.	"Think It Over (some)/Think It Over (some more)"	5:20
9.	"Another Whole Melodic Section"	1:53
10.	"When it feels natural..."	1:27

== Personnel ==
- Frank Zappa – guitar, vocals
- Tony Duran – guitar, vocals
- Ian Underwood – organ
- Sal Marquez – trumpet
- Malcolm McNab – trumpet
- Ken Shroyer – trombone
- Tony Ortega – baritone saxophone
- Alex Dmochowski (a.k.a. Erroneous) – bass guitar, vocals
- Aynsley Dunbar – drums
