= Halloween (Frank Zappa album) =

Live album by Frank Zappa
- Released: February 4, 2003
- Recorded: October 27–31, 1978
- Venue: The Palladium (New York City)
- Genre: Rock
- Length: 70:22
- Label: Vaulternative
- Producer: Dweezil Zappa

Frank Zappa chronology
FZ:OZ (2002)	Halloween (2003)	Joe's Corsage (2004)

Professional ratings
Review scores
Source	Rating
Allmusic	3/5 stars

Halloween is a live album by Frank Zappa, released in DVD-Audio format by Vaulternative Records in 2003. It features recordings compiled from various shows at The Palladium, New York City in late October 1978—including a Halloween show on October 31—along with some video content from the same period. In 2025, the full Halloween concert and the early show from October 27 were released in a box-set with a Frank Zappa devil costume.

== Overview ==
The set includes a performance of "Ancient Armaments", which appears on the album for the first time in digital form, having previously been included as the B-side to "I Don't Wanna Get Drafted" in 1980. The album cover art resembles the cover art of 1969's Hot Rats.

== Track listing ==
All tracks are written by Frank Zappa.

No.	Title	Recording venue and date	Length
1.	"NYC Audience"	The Palladium, October 31, 1978	1:17
2.	"Ancient Armaments"	The Palladium, October 31, 1978	8:23
3.	"Dancin' Fool"	The Palladium, October 31, 1978	4:35
4.	"Easy Meat"	The Palladium, October 27, 1978	6:03
5.	"Magic Fingers"	The Palladium, October 27 & 31, 1978	2:33
6.	"Don't Eat the Yellow Snow"	The Palladium, October 31, 1978	2:24
7.	"Conehead"	The Palladium, October 28, 1978	4:02
8.	"Zeets" (Vinnie Colaiuta)	The Palladium, October 31, 1978	2:58
9.	"Stink-Foot"	The Palladium, October 31, 1978	8:51
10.	"Dinah-Moe Humm"	The Palladium, October 27, 1978	5:27
11.	"Camarillo Brillo"	The Palladium, October 27, 1978	3:14
12.	"Muffin Man"	The Palladium, October 27, 1978	3:32
13.	"Black Napkins (The Deathless Horsie)"	The Palladium, October 31, 1978	16:56

Tricks Or Treats
No.	Title	Recording location and date	Length
1.	"Suicide Chump" (Black and white video)	Capitol Theatre, October 13, 1978	9:31
2.	"Dancin' Fool" (Color video)	Saturday Night Live, October 21, 1978	3:48
3.	"Radio interview" (Audio only)	WPIX with Mark Simone, October 30, 1978	9:41

== Personnel ==
- Frank Zappa – lead guitar, vocals
- Denny Walley – guitar, vocals
- Tommy Mars – keyboards
- Peter Wolf – keyboards
- Arthur Barrow – bass guitar
- Patrick O'Hearn – bass guitar
- Vinnie Colaiuta – drums
- Ed Mann – percussion
- L. Shankar – violin (tracks 7 and 13)
