= Buffalo (Frank Zappa album) =

Live album by Frank Zappa
- Released: April 1, 2007
- Recorded: October 25, 1980
- Venue: Buffalo Memorial Auditorium (Buffalo, New York)
- Genre: Rock
- Length: 140:35
- Label: Vaulternative
- Producers: Frank Zappa; Gail Zappa; Joe Travers

Frank Zappa chronology
Trance-Fusion (2006)	Buffalo (2007)	The Dub Room Special (2007)

Professional ratings
Review scores
Source	Rating
AllMusic	3.5/5 stars

Buffalo is a live album by Frank Zappa, posthumously released in April 2007 as a two-CD set, consisting of the complete concert given on October 25, 1980 at the Buffalo Memorial Auditorium in Buffalo, New York with a band that has previously been heard on Tinsel Town Rebellion (1981) and Shut Up 'n Play Yer Guitar (1981). It is the second installment on the Vaulternative Records label that is dedicated to the posthumous release of complete Zappa concerts, the first release being FZ:OZ, the concert on January 20, 1976 at the Hordern Pavilion in Sydney.

== Track listing ==
All tracks are written by Frank Zappa.

Disc one
No.	Title	Length
1.	"Chunga's Revenge"	8:34
2.	"You Are What You Is"	4:12
3.	"Mudd Club"	3:02
4.	"The Meek Shall Inherit Nothing"	3:21
5.	"Cosmik Debris"	3:50
6.	"Keep It Greasy"	2:58
7.	"Tinsel Town Rebellion"	4:19
8.	"Buffalo Drowning Witch"	2:44
9.	"Honey, Don't You Want a Man Like Me?"	4:36
10.	"Pick Me, I'm Clean"	10:15
11.	"Dead Girls of London"	3:02
12.	"Shall We Take Ourselves Seriously?"	1:36
13.	"City of Tiny Lites"	9:58

Disc two
No.	Title	Length
1.	"Easy Meat"	9:26
2.	"Ain't Got No Heart"	2:00
3.	"The Torture Never Stops"	23:36
4.	"Broken Hearts Are for Assholes"	3:39
5.	"I'm So Cute"	1:38
6.	"Andy"	8:14
7.	"Joe's Garage"	2:12
8.	"Dancin' Fool"	3:36
9.	"The "Real World" Thematic Extrapolations"	8:53
10.	"Stick It Out"	5:36
11.	"I Don't Wanna Get Drafted"	2:48
12.	"Bobby Brown"	2:42
13.	"Ms Pinky"	3:48

== Musicians ==
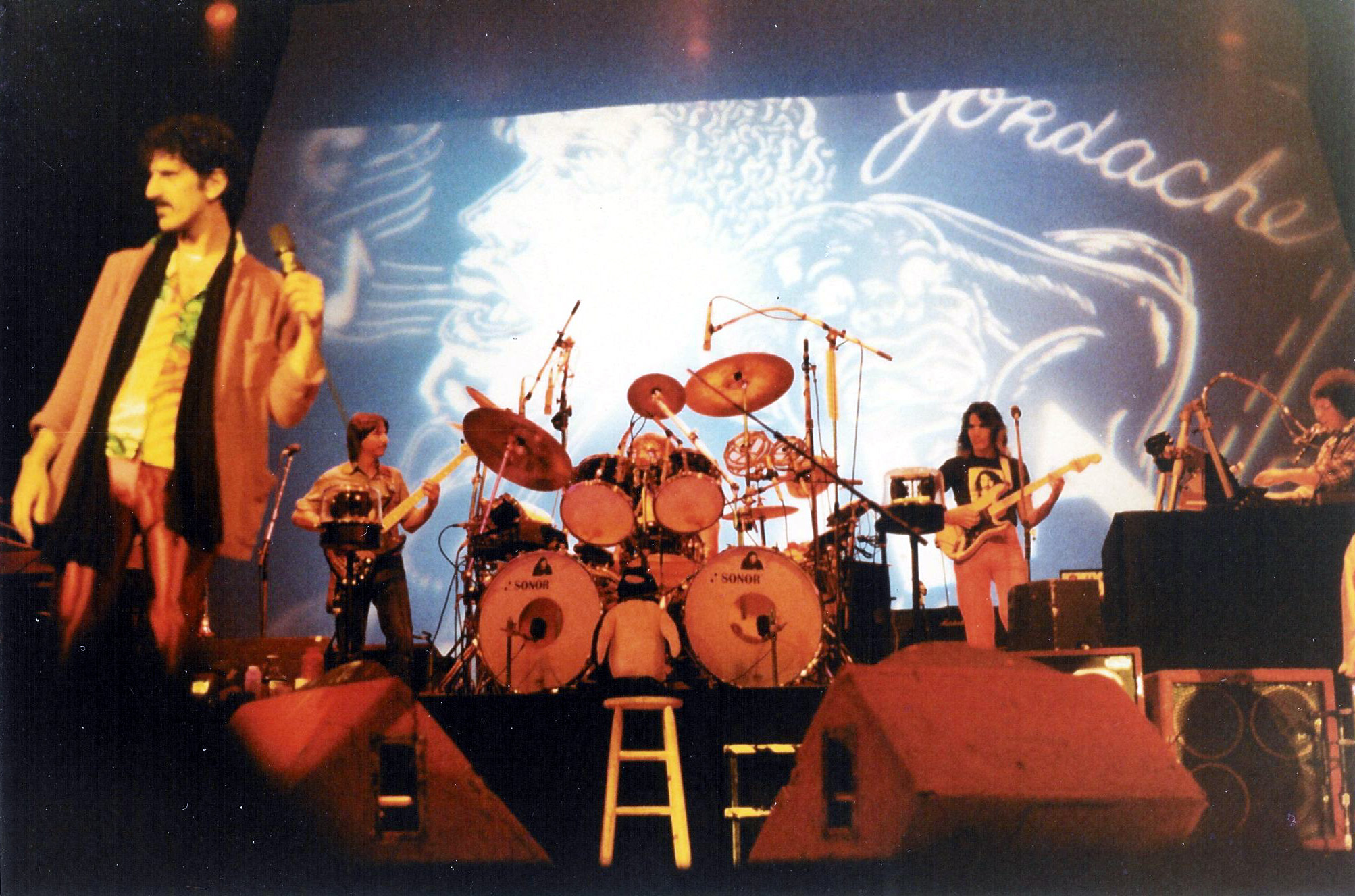
Frank Zappa and band during the concert, Memorial Auditorium, Buffalo, NY. 25 Oct 1980

- Frank Zappa – lead guitar & vocals
- Steve Vai – stunt guitar & background vocals
- Ray White – vocals & rhythm guitar
- Ike Willis – vocals & rhythm guitar
- Tommy Mars – keyboards & vocals
- Bob Harris – keyboards, trumpet & high vocals
- Arthur Barrow – bass & vocals
- Vinnie Colaiuta – drums, vocals

== Album credits ==
- Frank Zappa – music, performance, band & recordings
- Gail Zappa & Joe Travers – CD production
- Frank Filipetti – mix
- John Polito – mastering
- George Douglas – original recording engineer
- Gail Zappa – art direction/concept & text
- Keith Lawler – design, layout & art execution
- Kaushal Parekh – cover photo
