= Joe's Corsage =

Compilation album by Frank Zappa
- Released: May 30, 2004
- Recorded: 1964–1965
- Genre: Rock
- Length: 35:39
- Label: Vaulternative
- Producer: Joe Travers

Frank Zappa chronology
Halloween (2003)	Joe's Corsage (2004)	Joe's Domage (2004)

Professional ratings
Review scores
Source	Rating
AllMusic	(favorable)
Uncut	3/5 stars

Joe's Corsage is a compilation album featuring music recorded by Frank Zappa with The Mothers of Invention in the mid-1960s, before the recording of their debut album Freak Out! (1966). The album was compiled by archivist Joe Travers, and its title is a play on Zappa's 1979 work Joe's Garage.

== Overview ==
A number of the recordings featured on Joe's Corsage are demo versions of songs that would later appear on Freak Out!. The first set of demos, probably recorded in 1965, feature Henry Vestine on guitar, who would later be a member of Canned Heat. Also included are covers of the Righteous Brothers' "My Babe", and Marvin Gaye's "Hitch Hike". The opening and closing tracks are excerpts from an interview with Frank Zappa circa 1967.

== Track listing ==
All tracks are written by Frank Zappa.

No.	Title	Length
1.	"Pretty Pat"	0:33
2.	"Motherly Love"	2:21
3.	"Plastic People" (Richard Berry, Zappa)	3:05
4.	"Anyway the Wind Blows"	2:55
5.	"I Ain't Got No Heart"	3:50
6.	"The Phone Call/My Babe" (Bobby Hatfield, Bill Medley)	4:06
7.	"Wedding Dress Song/Handsome Cabin Boy" (Trad.)	1:02
8.	"Hitch Hike" (William "Mickey" Stevenson, Clarence Paul, Marvin Gaye)	2:54
9.	"I'm So Happy I Could Cry"	2:43
10.	"Go Cry on Somebody Else's Shoulder" (Zappa, Ray Collins)	3:29
11.	"How Could I Be Such a Fool?"	3:00
12.	"We Made Our Reputation Doing It That Way..."	5:34

== Personnel ==
- Frank Zappa – guitar, vocals
- Ray Collins – vocals, tambourine, harmonica (tracks 6–8)
- Henry Vestine (tracks 2–5) – guitar
- Roy Estrada – bass guitar
- Jimmy Carl Black – drums
