= Everything Is Healing Nicely =

EIHN (Everything Is Healing Nicely)

Studio album by Frank Zappa
- Released: December 21, 1999
- Recorded: July 1991
- Genre: 20th century classical
- Length: 68:32
- Label: UMRK
- Producer: Frank Zappa

Frank Zappa chronology
Mystery Disc (1998)	EIHN (Everything Is Healing Nicely) (1999)	FZ:OZ (2002)

Professional ratings
Review scores
Source	Rating
Allmusic	3/5 stars

EIHN (Everything Is Healing Nicely) is an album by Frank Zappa, posthumously released through the Zappa Family Trust in December 1999. It features recordings made with the Ensemble Modern in preparation for The Yellow Shark (1993). The recording features violinist L. Shankar on "Roland's Big Event/Strat Vindaloo" and "9/8 Objects".

== Track listing ==
All tracks are written by Frank Zappa, except where noted.

No.	Title	Length
1.	"Library Card"	7:42
2.	"This Is a Test"	1:35
3.	"Jolly Good Fellow"	4:34
4.	"Roland's Big Event/Strat Vindaloo"	5:56
5.	"Master Ringo"	3:35
6.	"T'Mershi Duween"	2:30
7.	"Nap Time"	8:02
8.	"9/8 Objects"	3:06
9.	"Naked City"	8:42
10.	"Whitey (Prototype)"	1:12
11.	"Amnerika Goes Home"	3:00
12.	"None of the Above (Revised & Previsited)"	8:38
13.	"Wonderful Tattoo!"	10:01
