= The Yellow Shark =

Live album by Frank Zappa and Ensemble Modern
- Released: 2 November 1993
- Recorded: 17–28 September 1992
- Venue: Alte Oper (Frankfurt); Berliner Philharmonie (Berlin); Konzerthaus, Vienna (Vienna)
- Genre: 20th century classical
- Length: 72:02
- Label: Barking Pumpkin
- Producer: Frank Zappa

Frank Zappa and Ensemble Modern chronology
Ahead of Their Time (1993)	The Yellow Shark (1993)	Civilization Phaze III (1994)

Professional ratings
Review scores
Source	Rating
Allmusic	4/5 stars

The Yellow Shark is an album of orchestral music by American musician Frank Zappa. Released in November 1993, it was the last album Zappa released in his lifetime, almost exactly a month before he died of cancer, which he had suffered from for several years. It features live recordings from the Ensemble Modern's 1992 performances of Zappa's compositions. In the album's notes, Zappa describes The Yellow Shark as one of the most fulfilling projects of his career, and as the best representation of his orchestral works.

Singer Tom Waits has listed it as one of his favourite albums, commenting: "The ensemble is awe-inspiring. It is a rich pageant of texture in colour. It's the clarity of his perfect madness, and mastery. Frank governs with Elmore James on his left and Stravinsky on his right. Frank reigns and rules with the strangest tools."

== History ==
In 1991, Zappa was chosen to be one of four featured composers at the Frankfurt Festival in 1992 (the others were John Cage, Karlheinz Stockhausen and Alexander Knaifel). Zappa was approached by the German chamber ensemble, Ensemble Modern, which was interested in playing his music for the event. Although ill, Zappa invited them to Los Angeles for rehearsals of new compositions and new arrangements of older material. In addition to being satisfied with the ensemble's performances of his music, Zappa also got along with the musicians, and the concerts in Germany and Austria were set up for the fall. The Canadian choreographer Édouard Lock, the Canadian dancer Louise Lecavalier, and his company La La La Human Steps were part of the show. In September 1992, the concerts went ahead as scheduled, but Zappa could only appear at two in Frankfurt due to illness. At the first concert, he conducted the opening "Overture", and the final "G-Spot Tornado" as well as the theatrical "Food Gathering in Post-Industrial America, 1992" and "Welcome to the United States" (the remainder of the program was conducted by the ensemble's regular conductor Peter Rundel). The first concert was aired live by German pay TV channel Premiere, presented by the station's "Special" host Christian Eckert. Zappa received a 20-minute ovation. It would become his last professional public appearance, as the cancer was spreading to such an extent that he was in too much pain to enjoy an event that he otherwise found "exhilarating". Recordings from the concerts appeared on The Yellow Shark, Zappa's last release during his lifetime.

The posthumous album Everything Is Healing Nicely, released in 1999, contains recordings from around the same time, made in preparation for the performances documented on The Yellow Shark.

== Track listing ==
No.	Title	Length
1.	"Intro"	1:43
2.	"Dog Breath Variations"	2:07
3.	"Uncle Meat"	3:24
4.	"Outrage at Valdez"	3:27
5.	"Times Beach II"	7:31
6.	"III Revised"	1:45
7.	"The Girl in the Magnesium Dress"	4:33
8.	"Be-Bop Tango"	3:43
9.	"Ruth Is Sleeping"	5:56
10.	"None of the Above"	2:17
11.	"Pentagon Afternoon"	2:28
12.	"Questi Cazzi Di Piccione (Note: Zappa intended the song title to mean "These fucking pigeons", a concept conveyed in Italian by using a slang term for penis. But his title is incorrectly translated, given that "Questi Cazzi di Piccione" actually translates as "These pigeon penises". "These fucking pigeons" is correctly translated in Italian as "Questi Cazzo Di Piccioni".)"	3:03
13.	"Times Beach III"	4:26
14.	"Food Gathering in Post-Industrial America, 1992"	2:52
15.	"Welcome to the United States"	6:39
16.	"Pound for a Brown"	2:12
17.	"Exercise #4"	1:37
18.	"Get Whitey"	7:00
19.	"G-Spot Tornado"	5:17

== Personnel ==
Musicians

- Frank Zappa – conductor, producer, performer
- Peter Rundel – conductor, violin
- Dietmar Wiesner – flute
- Catherine Milliken – oboe, english horn, bass oboe, (Note: Bass oboe uncredited, but visible on ARTE TV broadcast ("Get Whitey" segment).) didjeridu
- Roland Diry – clarinet
- Wolfgang Stryi – bass clarinet, tenor saxophone, contrabass clarinet
- Veit Scholz – bassoon, contrabassoon
- Franck Ollu, Stefan Dohr – french horn
- William Formann, Michael Gross – cornet, flugelhorn, piccolo trumpet, trumpet
- Uwe Dierksen – trombone, soprano trombone
- Michael Svoboda – trombone, euphonium, didjeridu, alphorn
- Daryl Smith – tuba
- Hermann Kretzschmar – celeste, harpsichord, voices, piano
- Ueli Wiget – celeste, harpsichord, harp, piano
- Rumi Ogawa-Helferich – cymbalom, percussion
- Andreas Böttger – percussion
- Detlef Tewes – mandolin
- Jürgen Ruck – banjo, guitar
- Ellen Wegner – harp
- Mathias Tacke, Claudia Sack – violin
- Hilary Sturt – violin, voices
- Friedemann Dähn – violoncello
- Thomas Fichter – contrabass, Fichter electric upright bass
- Ensemble Modern – main performer

Technical staff

- Todd Yvega – synclavier assistance
- Spencer Chrislu – engineer, mixing
- Harry Andronis – engineer
- Brian Johnson – art direction, design
- Hans Jörg Michel – photography
- Henning Lobner – photography
- Dave Dondorf – engineer, coordination
- Jesse Di Franco – art direction, design
- Mark Beam – Yellow Shark Sculpture
- Ali N. Askin – arranger
- Fritz Brinckmann – photography
- Rip Rense – liner notes booklet

== Charts ==
Billboard (United States)

Year	Chart	Position
1993	Top Classical Crossover	2

== See also ==
- Frank Zappa
- Ensemble Modern
