= Imaginary Diseases =

Live album by Frank Zappa
- Released: January 13, 2006
- Recorded: October 27 – December 15, 1972
- Genre: Progressive rock; jazz fusion
- Length: 63:14
- Label: Zappa
- Producer: Frank Zappa

Frank Zappa chronology
Joe's Xmasage (2005)	Imaginary Diseases (2006)	The MOFO Project/Object (2006)

Professional ratings
Review scores
Source	Rating
Allmusic	4.5/5 stars

Imaginary Diseases is an album of material by Frank Zappa from the Petit Wazoo tour of 1972. It is one of two finished CD projects from the tour containing material mastered by Zappa before his death. The name of the album is derived from a lyric in the Apostrophe (') (1974) song "Stink-Foot".

== Track listing ==
All tracks are written by Frank Zappa.

No.	Title	Recording venue and date	Length
1.	"Oddients"	Montreal Forum, October 27, 1972	1:13
2.	"Rollo"	Irvine Auditorium, November 10, 1972	3:21
3.	"Been to Kansas City in A Minor"	Cowtown Ballroom, December 2, 1972	10:15
4.	"Farther O'Blivion"	unknown	16:02
5.	"D.C. Boogie"	DAR Constitution Hall, November 11, 1972	13:27
6.	"Imaginary Diseases"	Palace Theater, November 1, 1972	9:45
7.	"Montreal"	Montreal Forum, October 27, 1972	9:11

== Personnel ==
- Frank Zappa – conductor, guitar, vocals
- Earl Dumler – woodwinds
- Tom Malone – saxes, piccolo trumpet, trumpet, tuba
- Malcolm McNab – trumpet
- Gary Barone – trumpet, flugelhorn
- Glenn Ferris – trombone
- Bruce Fowler – trombone
- Tony Duran – slide guitar
- Dave Parlato – bass
- Jim Gordon – drums

Composed/Produced/Performed/Edited/Mixed/Tweaked by Frank Zappa

Vaultmeistered by Joe Travers. Mastered by Doug Sax & Robert Hadley

Liner notes by Steve Vai.
