= The Man from Utopia =

- Cover art by Tanino Liberatore

Studio album with live elements by Frank Zappa
- Released: March 28, 1983
- Recorded: October 1980– October 1982
- Genre: Hard rock; progressive rock; art rock; comedy rock
- Length: 36:34
- Label: Barking Pumpkin
- Producer: Frank Zappa

Frank Zappa chronology
Ship Arriving Too Late to Save a Drowning Witch (1982)	The Man from Utopia (1983)	Baby Snakes (1983)

Singles from The Man from Utopia
- 1. "The Man from Utopia Meets Mary Lou" Released: 1983; 2. "Cocaine Decisions" Released: 1983

Professional ratings
Review scores
Source	Rating
AllMusic	2/5 stars

The Man from Utopia is the 36th album by American musician Frank Zappa, released in March 1983 by Barking Pumpkin Records. The album is named after a 1950s song, written by Donald and Doris Woods, which Zappa covers as part of "The Man from Utopia Meets Mary Lou".

== Production ==
"The Dangerous Kitchen", "Mōggio" and "The Jazz Discharge Party Hats" were all prepared for Zappa's unreleased album Chalk Pie.

The album was the second of two to credit Steve Vai with "impossible guitar parts", the first album being the preceding Ship Arriving Too Late to Save a Drowning Witch (1982).

== Cover art ==
The sleeve art features the work of Tanino Liberatore. It portrays Zappa on stage trying to kill mosquitoes. That is a reference to a concert held in Italy in 1982, the year before the release of the album, on 7 July at Parco Redecesio (which is also referred in a street sign on the album cover) in Segrate, near Milan. While Zappa was playing, a huge number of mosquitoes began flying on stage and gave the band a hard time. The back cover shows the audience as seen from the stage during the 1982 concert in Palermo, which ended in a riot.

The sleeve art is also a reference to Liberatore's comic character RanXerox.

== Music and lyrics ==
The album's opening track "Cocaine Decisions", with its groove redolent of skiffle washboards, is an attack on drug-influenced businessmen and features a harmonica. "The Dangerous Kitchen" satirizes dirty, unkempt kitchens.

"The Dangerous Kitchen", "The Radio Is Broken", and "The Jazz Discharge Party Hats" all feature Zappa's "meltdown" style of generally pre-written but sometimes improvised singing/speaking. For "Jazz" and "Kitchen", Zappa had guitarist Steve Vai overdub complex guitar parts for the entire length of the songs, which perfectly copied both the rhythm and pitch of Zappa's every word and syllable. This unique type of overdub was a one-time experiment that Zappa never repeated. Hungarian composer Péter Eötvös said in an interview:

"Dangerous Kitchen", off the album "The Man From Utopia", grew to become a basic piece for me, especially in later years, after I began working on operas. The technique that he uses in this particular song is very interesting: it's this half-sung, half-spoken performing method that's not quite like Sprechgesang, but what makes it so interesting is that he accompanies it with an instrumental solo. I was very surprised to find out that the guitar part was recorded separately. As it seemed so synchronous, I was convinced that Zappa had sung and played at the same time. Nevertheless the technique itself, the idea of "the singing instrument" comes from "Dangerous Kitchen".

== Release history ==
The album was originally released on vinyl in 1983. An unauthorized CD of this edition (with the exception of a remixed "Mōggio") coupled with Ship Arriving Too Late to Save a Drowning Witch was issued by EMI in the UK in 1988. The album was issued (in remixed and resequenced form with one additional track) on CD in 1993 by Barking Pumpkin. The later 1995 Rykodisc and 2012 Universal Music Group reissues are identical to the Barking Pumpkin CD.

== Track listing ==
All tracks are written by Frank Zappa, except where noted.

Side one
No.	Title	Length
1.	"Cocaine Decisions"	2:56
2.	"The Dangerous Kitchen"	2:51
3.	"Tink Walks Amok"	3:40
4.	"The Radio Is Broken"	5:52
5.	"Mōggio"	3:05
Total length:		18:28

Side two
No.	Title	Length
6.	"The Man from Utopia Meets Mary Lou" (Donald and Doris Woods, Obie Jessie)	3:19
7.	"Stick Together"	3:50
8.	"SEX"	3:00
9.	"The Jazz Discharge Party Hats"	4:30
10.	"We Are Not Alone"	3:31
Total length:		18:18

1993 CD release
No.	Title	Length
1.	"Cocaine Decisions"	3:53
2.	"SEX"	3:44
3.	"Tink Walks Amok"	3:39
4.	"The Radio Is Broken"	5:51
5.	"We Are Not Alone"	3:18
6.	"The Dangerous Kitchen"	2:51
7.	"The Man from Utopia Meets Mary Lou"	3:22
8.	"Stick Together"	3:14
9.	"The Jazz Discharge Party Hats"	4:29
10.	"Luigi & the Wise Guys"	3:25
11.	"Mōggio"	2:35
Total length:		40:20

== Personnel ==
- Frank Zappa – guitar, vocals, drum machine, ARP 2600, Prophet 5 Synthesizer
- Steve Vai – guitar, acoustic guitar, impossible guitar parts
- Ray White – guitar, vocals
- Roy Estrada – vocals
- Bob Harris – boy soprano
- Ike Willis – vocals
- Bobby Martin – keyboards, saxophone, vocals
- Tommy Mars – keyboards
- Arthur Barrow – keyboards, bass, micro bass, rhythm guitar
- Ed Mann – percussion
- Scott Thunes – bass
- Jay Anderson – string bass
- Chad Wackerman – drums
- Vinnie Colaiuta – drums
- Craig Twister Steward – harmonica
- Dick Fegy – mandolin
- Marty Krystall – saxophone

== Charts ==
Album - Billboard (United States)

Year	Chart	Position
1983	Billboard 200	153
