= The Grand Wazoo =

- original issue cover

Studio album by The Mothers
- Released: November 27, 1972
- Recorded: April–May 1972
- Studios: Paramount Studios (Hollywood, CA)
- Genres: Jazz fusion; big band; progressive rock
- Length: 38:06
- Label: Bizarre/Reprise
- Producer: Frank Zappa

Frank Zappa chronology
| Waka/Jawaka (1972) | The Grand Wazoo (1972) | Over-Nite Sensation (1973) |

The Mothers chronology
| Just Another Band from L.A. (1972) | The Grand Wazoo (1972) | Over-Nite Sensation (1973) |

Singles from The Grand Wazoo
- 1. "Cletus Awreetus-Awrightus" Released: 1972 (Note: Promo issue, with A-Side Mono (DJ airplay) version & B-Side Stereo version of same track.)

Professional ratings
Review scores
| Source | Rating |
|---|---|
| AllMusic | 4.5/5 stars |

The Grand Wazoo is the eleventh album by The Mothers, sixteenth overall by Frank Zappa, released in November 1972. It was written and recorded during Zappa's period of convalescence after being assaulted in December 1971 in London, UK.

== Overview ==
Along with its predecessor Waka/Jawaka (July 1972), this album represents Zappa's foray into big band music, the logical progression from Hot Rats (1969) (which used a much smaller lineup). This was the last release on Zappa's own Bizarre Records label.

== Recording and production ==
This was the second Zappa album released in a period where he needed to use a wheelchair. Zappa was unable to tour after being assaulted and pushed offstage into an orchestra pit during a concert on December 10, 1971, at the Rainbow Theatre in London, UK.

The album is mostly made up of instrumental pieces, similar in style to those of three previous albums: Hot Rats (October 1969), Burnt Weeny Sandwich (February 1970), and Waka/Jawaka (July 1972).

== Track listing ==
All tracks are written by Frank Zappa.

Side one
| No. | Title | Length |
|---|---|---|
| 1. | "For Calvin (And His Next Two Hitch-Hikers)" | 6:05 |
| 2. | "The Grand Wazoo" | 13:18 |
| Total length: | | 19:59 |

Side two
| No. | Title | Length |
|---|---|---|
| 3. | "Cletus Awreetus-Awrightus" | 2:57 |
| 4. | "Eat That Question" | 6:42 |
| 5. | "Blessed Relief" | 8:00 |
| Total length: | | 18:07 |

1990 Zappa Records compact disc
| No. | Title | Length |
|---|---|---|
| 1. | "The Grand Wazoo" | 13:19 |
| 2. | "For Calvin (And His Next Two Hitch-Hikers)" | 6:06 |
| 3. | "Cletus Awreetus-Awrightus" | 2:57 |
| 4. | "Eat That Question" | 6:42 |
| 5. | "Blessed Relief" | 7:59 |

== Personnel ==
=== Musicians ===
"The Grand Wazoo" and "For Calvin (And His Next Two Hitch-Hikers)"

- Mike Altschul – woodwind
- Billy Byers – trombone (including solo on "The Grand Wazoo")
- Joanna Caldwell – woodwind
- Earl Dumler – woodwind
- Aynsley Dunbar – drums
- Tony Duran – guitar (including bottleneck guitar solo on "The Grand Wazoo")
- Erroneous (Alex Dmochowski) – bass
- Alan Estes – percussion
- Fred Jackson – woodwind
- Sal Marquez – vocals, trumpet (including solo on "The Grand Wazoo")
- Malcolm McNab – brass
- Janet Neville-Ferguson – vocals
- Tony "Bat Man" Ortega – woodwind
- Don Preston – minimoog (including solo on "The Grand Wazoo")
- Johnny Rotella – woodwind
- Ken Shroyer – brass, "contractor and spiritual guidance"
- Ernie Tack – brass
- Frank Zappa – guitar (including opening solo on "The Grand Wazoo")
- Bob Zimmitti – percussion

"Cletus Awreetus-Awrightus"

- Mike Altschul – woodwind
- "Chunky" (Lauren Wood) – vocals
- George Duke – keyboards, vocals
- Erroneous (Alex Dmochowski) – bass
- Aynsley Dunbar – drums
- Sal Marquez – brass
- Ken Shroyer – trombones
- Frank Zappa – vocals, guitar

with:

- Ernie Watts – C Melody Saxophone (the "Mystery Horn") solo

"Eat That Question"

- Mike Altschul – woodwind
- George Duke – keyboards
- Aynsley Dunbar – drums
- Erroneous (Alex Dmochowski) – bass
- Sal Marquez – "multiple toots" (brass)
- Joel Peskin – woodwind
- Frank Zappa – guitar, percussion

with:

- Lee Clement – gong

"Blessed Relief"

- Mike Altschul – woodwind
- George Duke – keyboards
- Aynsley Dunbar – drums
- Tony Duran – rhythm guitar
- Erroneous (Alex Dmochowski) – bass
- Sal Marquez – brass
- Joel Peskin – woodwind
- Frank Zappa – lead guitar

=== Production ===
- Producer: Frank Zappa
- Engineer: Kerry McNabb
- Arranger: Frank Zappa
- Special assistance: Paul Hof
- Photography: Ed Caraeff, Tony Esparza, Barry Feinstein
- Cover illustration: Cal Schenkel
- Art direction: Frank Zappa
- Spiritual advisor: Kenny Shroyer
- Contractor: Kenny Shroyer
- Burritos: Ernie's Taco House
- Pizza: two guys from Italy
- Barbecue desiccated chicken: Hollywood Ranch Market
