= FZ:OZ =

Frank Zappa album

Live album by Frank Zappa
- Released: August 16, 2002
- Recorded: January 20, 1976
- Venues: Hordern Pavilion, Sydney, Australia
- Genres: Progressive rock; art rock; experimental rock
- Length: 146:56
- Label: Vaulternative
- Producer: Dweezil Zappa

Frank Zappa chronology
EIHN (Everything Is Healing Nicely) (1999)	FZ:OZ (2002)	Halloween (2003)

Professional ratings
Review scores
Source	Rating
AllMusic	4/5 stars

FZ:OZ (pronounced "eff-zee oh-zee"; in imitation of "Aussie") is a live album by Frank Zappa, released in 2002 as a two-CD set and is the first release on the Vaulternative Records label from the Zappa Family Trust. It contains almost all of the January 20, 1976 concert at the Hordern Pavilion in Sydney, Australia.

== Overview ==
Only one reel-to-reel tape machine was available to record the concert, resulting in gaps in some songs as the tape needed to be changed. However, these gaps have been filled in with bootleg recordings from the same tour. As a result, there is a drop in sound quality during these sections, but the concert is preserved almost in its entirety. Yet, two songs are missing: "Honey, Don't You Want a Man Like Me?" (played between "Advance Romance" and "The Illinois Enema Bandit") and "Tryin' to Grow a Chin" (played between "Wind Up Workin' in a Gas Station" and "The Torture Never Stops").

Much of the featured material had not been released at the time of the recording, including "Canard Toujours", which later became "Kreega Bondola", then later changed to "Let's Move to Cleveland", which was included on Does Humor Belong in Music? (1986), and several tracks that would later appear on Zoot Allures (1976). One song, "Kaiser Rolls", appears for the first time on FZ:OZ, and in two versions—the recording from the concert, which has had a missing section edited in, and a rehearsal version recorded before the start of the tour which is included at the end of disc two, entitled "Kaiser Rolls (Du Jour)". The lengthy guitar solo on "Zoot Allures" contains a section with extensive use of a VCF (voltage-controlled filter). This part was subsequently entitled "Ship Ahoy" when Zappa released its counterpart from Osaka (February 3, 1976) on Shut Up 'n Play Yer Guitar in 1981. However, it wasn't separated into its own track on FZ:OZ.

== Track listing ==
All tracks are written by Frank Zappa.

Disc one
No.	Title	Length
1.	"Hordern Intro (Incan Art Vamp)"	3:10
2.	"Stink-Foot"	6:35
3.	"The Poodle Lecture"	3:05
4.	"Dirty Love"	3:13
5.	"Filthy Habits"	6:18
6.	"How Could I Be Such a Fool?"	3:27
7.	"I Ain't Got No Heart"	2:26
8.	"I'm Not Satisfied"	1:54
9.	"Black Napkins"	11:57
10.	"Advance Romance"	11:17
11.	"The Illinois Enema Bandit"	8:45
12.	"Wind Up Workin' in a Gas Station"	4:14
13.	"The Torture Never Stops"	7:12

Disc two
No.	Title	Length
1.	"Canard Toujours"	3:22
2.	"Kaiser Rolls"	3:17
3.	"Find Her Finer"	3:48
4.	"Carolina Hard-Core Ecstasy"	6:12
5.	"Lonely Little Girl"	2:39
6.	"Take Your Clothes Off When You Dance"	2:02
7.	"What's the Ugliest Part of Your Body?"	1:07
8.	"Chunga's Revenge"	15:41
9.	"Zoot Allures"	12:50
10.	"Keep It Greasy"	4:40
11.	"Dinah-Moe Humm"	6:54
12.	"Camarillo Brillo"	3:58
13.	"Muffin Man"	3:41
14.	"Kaiser Rolls (Du Jour)"	3:00

"Zoot Allures" includes the VCF section known elsewhere as "Ship Ahoy".

== Personnel ==
- Frank Zappa – guitar, vocals
- Terry Bozzio – drums, vocals
- Napoleon Murphy Brock – tenor sax, vocals
- Roy Estrada – bass, vocals
- Andre Lewis – keyboards, vocals
- Norman Gunston – guest harmonica on "The Torture Never Stops" (credited as "a fine, fine TV show host & very reasonable harmonica player with exceedingly funny persuasions")

Production

- Frank Zappa – music, performance, band & recordings
- Sydney, Australia – audience
- Dweezil Zappa – producer
- Joe Travers – vaultmeisterment
- Spencer Chrislu – mixing at UMRK
- Steve Hall – mastering at Future Disc
- Gail Zappa with Dweezil & Joe – executive producer/liner notes
- GZ – package concept
- Tracy Veal & Eric Josephbek – design rendering for Creative Portal
- Kent Huffnagle – timewarp pitch adjustment on "Zoot" bootleg
- Bill Lantz – "thanks (you bastard) for (not saying by what means you came by) this tape and cooperating (anyway)"
- Jenny Brown – honorable mention
