= Malcolm McNab =

American musician

Malcolm Boyd McNab
- Born: March 25, 1943 (age 83); Cleveland, Ohio, United States
- Origin: Los Angeles, California
- Genres: Freelance studio, all musical styles
- Occupations: Trumpeter, session musician
- Instruments: Trumpet, piccolo trumpet
- Years active: 1963–present
- Label: Kinnell House Records
- Website: www.MalcolmMcNab.com
- Military service
- Allegiance: United States
- Branch: United States Army
- Service years: 1966–1969
- Unit: USMA Band

Malcolm Boyd McNab (born March 25, 1943) is a trumpeter and player of other brass instruments, and a Los Angeles-based session musician.

== Education ==
Raised in the San Gabriel Valley, McNab began studying the trumpet at the age of nine, with his father as his first teacher. Later, he studied with Pasadena maestro Walter Laursen, and performed with the Pasadena Symphony at the age of fourteen while still attending Mark Keppel High School in Alhambra.

In 1958 at the age of 15, McNab began playing with the Young Musicians Foundation Debut Orchestra under conductors Dr. Miklos Rosza, Lawrence Foster, Gerhard Samuel and Henry Lewis.

It was at that time that McNab began his studies with James Stamp.

After touring with the San Francisco Ballet and service in the U.S. Army, playing with the West Point band, he studied privately in New York City with John Ware and William Vacchiano.

== Professional career ==
On returning to Southern California, McNab began working as a session musician as well as playing live solo performances with various regional orchestras. Since 1970, he has recorded classical music with such organizations as the Los Angeles Philharmonic Orchestra, the Los Angeles Chamber Orchestra, and the New York City Opera.

His recording credits in popular music include albums with Dionne Warwick, Peggy Lee, Chicago, and The Carpenters. He has also appeared on albums by Frank Zappa, including; Joe's Domage, Studio Tan, Imaginary Diseases and The Grand Wazoo (credited as Malcolm McNabb).

He has performed on albums by jazz musicians such as Les McCann.

== Films and television ==
McNab has played on the soundtracks of over a thousand films and TV shows. McNab has contributed to numerous major film and television scores, particularly in orchestral and solo trumpet roles.

McNab has twice been the recipient of the Most Valuable Player Award of the National Academy of Recording Arts and Sciences.
