= Waka/Jawaka =

- original issue cover

Studio album by Frank Zappa
- Released: July 5, 1972
- Recorded: April 17–21 and May 5, 1972
- Studio: Paramount Studios, Los Angeles, California
- Genre: Jazz fusion; progressive rock; big band
- Length: 36:08
- Label: Bizarre/Reprise
- Producer: Frank Zappa

Frank Zappa chronology
Just Another Band from L.A. (1972)	Waka/Jawaka (1972)	The Grand Wazoo (1972)

Frank Zappa (solo) chronology
Chunga's Revenge (1970)	Waka/Jawaka (1972)	Apostrophe (') (1974)

Audio sample
- Sample of the album's title track: file; help

Waka/Jawaka (also known as Waka/Jawaka — Hot Rats) is the fourth solo album (and fifteenth album counting the work with his band the Mothers of Invention) by Frank Zappa, released in July 1972. The album is the jazz-influenced precursor to The Grand Wazoo (November 1972), and as the front cover indicates, a sequel of sorts to 1969's Hot Rats. According to Zappa, the title "is something that showed up on a Ouija board at one time."

== Songs ==
"Big Swifty" is a jazz-fusion tune, similar to many of Zappa's pieces from the jazz period of his compositional timeline. It features many horns to achieve a thick brassy sound as well as room for improvisation and use of multiple time signatures. The tune initially alternates between 7/8 and 3/4 time signatures, soon settling on a 4/4 swing feel for several extended solos. Known recorded live versions expanded rhythmic diversification to 11/8 and rubato parts (e.g. live in Texas, 1973).

The track "It Just Might Be a One-Shot Deal" is a strange tale of hallucinations sung by Sal Marquez and Janet Ferguson (the "tough-minded" groupie in 200 Motels). Sneaky Pete Kleinow's pedal steel guitar sets up a dream-like, smooth quality, but with the words "but you should be diggin' it while it's happening cause it just might be a one-shot deal", though played in real time rather than achieved with a splice, it again sounds as if the music has started to run backwards.

== Critical reception ==
Professional ratings
Review scores
Source	Rating
AllMusic	3.5/5 stars
Christgau's Record Guide	B
Kerrang!	2.5/5 stars
Rolling Stone	(favorable)

Initial reviews for the album were mixed. Rolling Stone's Rob Houghton compared it to "second-rate Miles Davis," but concluded that Waka/Jawaka was "one of Zappa’s most enjoyable, less hypertense efforts." Village Voice critic Robert Christgau was less charitable: "With Sal Marquez playing 'many trumpets' all over 'Big Swifty,' there are times you could drop the needle and think you were listening to recent Miles Davis. That's certainly what Zappa's been doing. But where Davis is occasionally too loose, Zappa's always too tight—he seems to perceive only what is weird and alienating in his influences, never what is humane. Also, Sal Marquez doesn't play trumpet(s) as good as Miles." However, the album's reputation has improved over time. In UDiscoverMusic in 2022, Jamie Atkins wrote, "Waka/Jawaka stands up on its own as one of Zappa’s most vibrant and enjoyable explorations of jazz-rock."

== Reissues ==
The album was reissued in a digitally remastered version on CD by Rykodisc in 1988 (with much digital reverb added and missing the original back cover artwork) and in 1995 (restoring the rear cover, but with identical sound). In 2012, Universal Music released a CD containing a remastered version of the original vinyl mix.

On December 16, 2022, Universal Music released Dolby Atmos & Dolby TrueHD mix of this album along with The Grand Wazoo as part of a 4CD+1Blu-Ray set named Waka/Wazoo, to celebrate the 50th Anniversary of the albums. The album was also released in black and colored vinyl to celebrate the 50th Anniversary.

== Track listing ==
All tracks are written by Frank Zappa.

Side one
No.	Title	Length
1.	"Big Swifty"	17:22
Total length:		17:22

Side two
No.	Title	Length
2.	"Your Mouth"	3:12
3.	"It Just Might Be a One-Shot Deal"	4:16
4.	"Waka/Jawaka"	11:18
Total length:		18:43

== Personnel ==
=== Musicians on the album ===
- Frank Zappa – guitar (all tracks, including acoustic guitar on track 3), percussion (1), electric bed springs and uncredited vocals (3)
- Sal Marquez – trumpets (all tracks), vocals (2, 3); chimes (1, 4), flugelhorn (4)
- Erroneous (Alex Dmochowski) – electric bass (all tracks), vocals (3), fuzz bass (4)
- Aynsley Dunbar – drums (all tracks), washboard and tambourine (3)
- Tony Duran – slide guitar (1-3), vocals (3)
- George Duke – ring-modulated & echoplexed electric piano (1), tack piano (2)
- Mike Altschul – baritone saxophone and piccolo (2, 4), bass flute, bass clarinet and tenor sax (4)
- Kris Peterson – vocals (2, 4)
- Joel Peskin – tenor sax (2)
- Jeff Simmons – Hawaiian guitar and vocals (3)
- Sneaky Pete Kleinow – pedal steel guitar solo (3)
- Janet Ferguson – vocals (3)
- Don Preston – piano and Minimoog (4)
- Billy Byers – trombone and baritone horn (4)
- Ken Shroyer – trombone and baritone horn (4)

=== Production ===
- Producer: Frank Zappa
- Engineers: Marshall Brevitz, Kerry McNabb
- Mastering: Frank Zappa
- Supervisor: Marshall Brevitz
- Concept: Sal Marquez
- Creative consultant: Sal Marquez
- Design: Cal Schenkel
- Cover Design: Cal Schenkel
- Cover illustration: Marvin Mattelson
- Illustrations: Marvin Mattelson
- Photography: Philip Schartz
- Back cover: Philip Schwartz
- Packaging: Cal Schenkel
- Repackaging: Ferenc Dobronyi

== Charts ==
1972 chart performance for Waka/Jawaka
Chart (1972)	Peak position
US Billboard 200	152

2022 chart performance for Waka/Jawaka
Chart (2022)	Peak position
German Albums (Offizielle Top 100)	24
