= Frank Zappa discography =

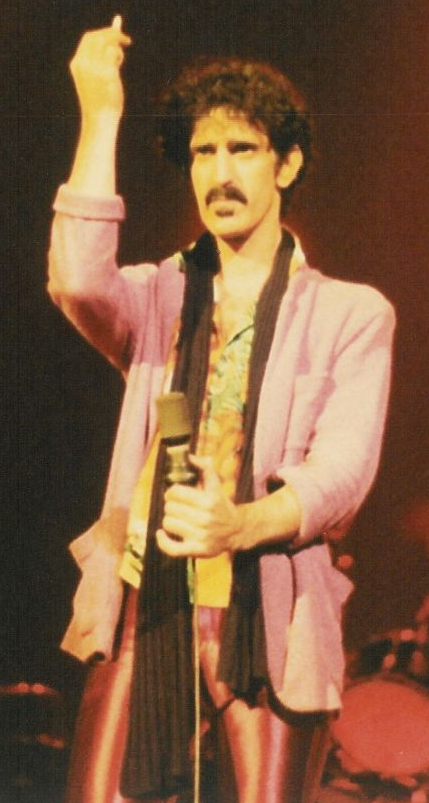
- Zappa in 1980
- Official releases: 62
- Posthumous official releases: 74
- Singles: 39
- Films and videos: 11
- Compilations: 19

This is a list of albums by Frank Zappa, including all those credited to the Mothers of Invention. During his lifetime, Zappa released 62 albums. Since 1994, the Zappa Family Trust has released 74 posthumous albums and box sets as of December 2026, making a total of 136 official releases.

In 2012 the distribution of Zappa's recorded output moved to Universal Music Enterprises. In June 2022 the Zappa Trust announced that it had sold Zappa's entire catalog to Universal Music, including master tapes, song copyrights and trademarks.

A list of albums of Zappa's music as performed by other artists is also included here.

== Official releases ==
Released			Title	Peak chart positions							Certifications (sales thresholds)
No.	Year	Month	Title	US	UK	GER	NOR	SWE	AUS	AUT	Certifications (sales thresholds)
1	1966	Jun	Freak Out! (with the Mothers of Invention)	130	—	—	—	—	—	—	
2	1967	May	Absolutely Free (with the Mothers of Invention)	41	—	—	—	—	—	—	
4	1968	Mar	We're Only in It for the Money (with the Mothers of Invention)	30	31	—	—	—	—	—	
3	1968	May	Lumpy Gravy (with the Abnuceals Emuukha Electric Symphony Orchestra & Chorus)	159	—	—	—	—	—	—	
5	1968	Dec	Cruising with Ruben & the Jets (with the Mothers of Invention)	110	—	—	—	—	—	—	
7	1969	Mar	Mothermania (with the Mothers of Invention)	151	—	—	—	—	—	—	
6	1969	Apr	Uncle Meat (with the Mothers of Invention)	43	—	—	—	—	—	—	
8	1969	Oct	Hot Rats	173	9	45	—	—	19	—	
9	1970	Feb	Burnt Weeny Sandwich (with the Mothers of Invention)	94	17	—	—	—	—	—	
10	1970	Aug	Weasels Ripped My Flesh (with the Mothers of Invention)	189	28	—	—	—	—	—	
11	1970	Oct	Chunga's Revenge	119	43	—	—	—	24	—	
12	1971	Aug	Fillmore East – June 1971 (with the Mothers of Invention)	38	—	—	—	—	22	—	
13	1971	Oct	200 Motels (with the Mothers of Invention and the Royal Philharmonic Orchestra)	59	—	44	—	—	48	—	
14	1972	Mar	Just Another Band from L.A. (with the Mothers of Invention)	85	—	—	—	—	41	—	
15	1972	Jul	Waka/Jawaka	152	—	24	—	—	—	—	
16	1972	Nov	The Grand Wazoo (with the Mothers of Invention)	—	—	—	—	—	—	—	
17	1973	Sep	Over-Nite Sensation (with the Mothers of Invention)	32	—	21	15	10	47	—	US: Gold
18	1974	Mar	Apostrophe (')	10	—	7	6	6	71	—	US: Gold
19	1974	Sep	Roxy & Elsewhere (with the Mothers of Invention)	27	—	—	14	4	—	—	
20	1975	Jun	One Size Fits All (with the Mothers of Invention)	26	—	—	5	6	81	—	
21	1975	Oct	Bongo Fury (with Captain Beefheart and the Mothers of Invention)	66	—	—	11	—	—	—	
22	1976	Oct	Zoot Allures	61	—	—	16	17	82	—	UK: Silver
23	1978	Mar	Zappa in New York	57	55	20	6	24	74	—	
24	1978	Sep	Studio Tan	147	—	—	—	30	92	—	
25	1979	Jan	Sleep Dirt	175	—	—	16	19	—	—	
26	1979	Mar	Sheik Yerbouti	21	32	10	5	4	53	6	CAN: Gold
27	1979	May	Orchestral Favorites	168	—	48	—	—	—	—	
28	1979	Sep	Joe's Garage Act I	27	62	41	1	2	94	8	CAN: Gold
29	1979	Nov	Joe's Garage Acts II & III	53	75	31	3	4	—	9	
30	1981	May	Tinsel Town Rebellion	66	55	23	13	8	—	9	
31	1981	May	Shut Up 'n Play Yer Guitar	—	—	—	—	—	—	—	
32	1981	May	Shut Up 'n Play Yer Guitar Some More	—	—	—	—	—	—	—	
33	1981	May	Return of the Son of Shut Up 'n Play Yer Guitar	—	—	—	—	—	—	—	
34	1981	Sep	You Are What You Is	93	51	—	12	22	—	—	
35	1982	May	Ship Arriving Too Late to Save a Drowning Witch	23	61	65	20	26	—	—	
31/32/33	1982	Sep	Shut Up 'n Play Yer Guitar (All three albums reissued together)	—	—	—	—	—	—	—	
36	1983	Mar	The Man from Utopia	153	87	—	—	23	—	—	
37	1983	Mar	Baby Snakes	—	—	67	—	—	—	—	
38	1983	Jun	London Symphony Orchestra, Vol. I (Kent Nagano conducting the London Symphony Orchestra)	—	—	—	—	—	—	—	
39	1984	Aug	The Perfect Stranger (with Pierre Boulez conducting the Ensemble InterContemporain)	—	—	—	—	—	—	—	
40	1984	Oct	Them or Us	—	53	42	—	22	—	—	
41	1984	Nov	Thing-Fish	—	—	—	—	—	—	—	
42	1984	Nov	Francesco Zappa	—	—	—	—	—	—	—	
43	1985	Apr	The Old Masters, Box I	—	—	—	—	—	—	—	
44	1985	Nov	Frank Zappa Meets the Mothers of Prevention	153	—	—	—	—	—	—	
45	1986	Jan	Does Humor Belong in Music?	—	—	—	—	—	—	—	
46	1986	Nov	The Old Masters, Box II	—	—	—	—	—	—	—	
47	1986	Nov	Jazz from Hell	—	—	—	—	—	—	—	
28/29	1987	Jun	Joe's Garage, Acts I, II & III (All three acts reissued together)	—	—	—	—	—	—	—	
48	1987	Sep	London Symphony Orchestra, Vol. II (Kent Nagano conducting the London Symphony Orchestra)	—	—	—	—	—	—	—	
49	1987	Dec	The Old Masters, Box III	—	—	—	—	—	—	—	
50	1988	Apr	Guitar	—	82	40	—	—	—	25	
51	1988	May	You Can't Do That on Stage Anymore, Vol. 1	—	—	—	—	—	—	—	
52	1988	Oct	You Can't Do That on Stage Anymore, Vol. 2	—	—	—	—	—	—	—	
53	1988	Oct	Broadway the Hard Way	—	—	—	—	—	—	—	
54	1989	Nov	You Can't Do That on Stage Anymore, Vol. 3	—	—	—	—	—	—	—	
55	1991	Apr	The Best Band You Never Heard in Your Life	—	—	—	—	—	—	—	
57	1991	Jun	Make a Jazz Noise Here	—	—	—	—	—	—	—	
56	1991	Jun	You Can't Do That on Stage Anymore, Vol. 4	—	—	—	—	—	—	—	
58	1992	Jul	You Can't Do That on Stage Anymore, Vol. 5	—	—	—	—	—	—	—	
59	1992	Jul	You Can't Do That on Stage Anymore, Vol. 6	—	—	—	—	—	—	—	
60	1992	Oct	Playground Psychotics (with the Mothers of Invention)	—	—	—	—	—	—	—	
61	1993	Mar	Ahead of Their Time (with the Mothers of Invention)	—	—	—	—	—	—	—	
62	1993	Oct	The Yellow Shark (with Ensemble Modern)	—	—	61	—	—	—	30	
"—" denotes a recording that did not chart or was not released in that territory.

== Posthumous official releases ==
Released			Title	Peak chart positions	
No.	Year	Month	Title	GER	SWE
63	1994	Dec	Civilization Phaze III	87	—
38/48	1995	Apr	London Symphony Orchestra, Vol. I & II (Remixed versions of both volumes)	—	—
64	1996	Feb	The Lost Episodes	—	54
65	1996	Sep	Läther	—	50
66	1996	Oct	Frank Zappa Plays the Music of Frank Zappa: A Memorial Tribute	—	—
67	1997	May	Have I Offended Someone?	—	—
68	1998	Sep	Mystery Disc	—	—
69	1999	Dec	EIHN - Everything Is Healing Nicely	—	—
70	2002	Aug	FZ:OZ	—	—
71	2003	Feb	Halloween (DVD-Audio)	—	—
72	2004	May	Joe's Corsage	—	—
74	2004	Sep	QuAUDIOPHILIAc (DVD-Audio)	—	—
73	2004	Oct	Joe's Domage	—	—
75	2005	Dec	Joe's XMASage	—	—
76	2006	Jan	Imaginary Diseases	—	—
79	2006	Nov	Trance-Fusion	—	—
78	2006	Dec	The MOFO Project/Object	—	—
77	2006	Dec	The MOFO Project/Object (fazedooh)	—	—
80	2007	Apr	Buffalo	—	—
81	2007	Aug	The Dub Room Special!	—	—
82	2007	Oct	Wazoo	—	—
83	2008	Jun	One Shot Deal	—	—
84	2008	Sep	Joe's Menage	—	—
85	2009	Jan	The Lumpy Money Project/Object	—	—
86	2009	Dec	Philly '76	—	—
87	2010	Apr	Greasy Love Songs	—	—
88	2010	Sep	"Congress Shall Make No Law..."	—	—
89	2010	Nov	Hammersmith Odeon	—	—
90	2011	Sep	Feeding the Monkies at Ma Maison	—	—
91	2011	Oct	Carnegie Hall (with the Mothers of Invention)	—	—
93	2012	Oct	Understanding America	—	—
92	2012	Nov	Road Tapes, Venue #1	—	—
94	2012	Dec	Finer Moments	—	—
95	2012	Dec	AAAFNRAA — Baby Snakes — The Compleat Soundtrack (Download only)	—	—
96	2013	Oct	Road Tapes, Venue #2	—	—
97	2013	Nov	A Token of His Extreme Soundtrack	—	—
98	2014	Jan	Joe's Camouflage	—	—
99	2014	Mar	Roxy by Proxy	—	—
100	2015	Jun	Dance Me This	—	—
102	2015	Oct	Roxy — The Soundtrack (with the Mothers of Invention; included in Roxy the Movie DVD/CD or BD/CD, CD not sold separately)	39	—
101	2015	Nov	200 Motels: The Suites (Esa-Pekka Salonen conducting the Los Angeles Philharmonic and the Los Angeles Master Chorale)	—	—
103	2016	May	Road Tapes, Venue #3	—	—
104	2016	Jul	The Crux of the Biscuit	—	—
105	2016	Jul	Frank Zappa for President	—	—
106	2016	Sep	ZAPPAtite: Frank Zappa's Tastiest Tracks	—	—
107	2016	Nov	Meat Light: The Uncle Meat Project/Object Audio Documentary (with the Mothers of Invention)	—	—
108	2016	Nov	Chicago '78	—	—
109	2016	Nov	Little Dots	—	—
110	2017	Oct	Halloween 77 (Costume Box Set containing a 24-bit WAV audio USB stick of the complete 6 shows: 10.28.77 (2 shows), 10.29.77 (2 shows), 10.30.77, 10.31.77) (Note: The package contains: the Frank Zappa 1977 mask and costume, a USB stick containing six concerts in 24-bit WAV audio, and a 32-page PDF digital booklet with extensive liner notes.)	—	—
110K	2017	Oct	Halloween 77: October 31, 1977 (Note: The bonus section four tracks on disc three (tracks 8-11) are taken from the 10-30-77 show.)	—	—
111	2018	Feb	The Roxy Performances (with the Mothers of Invention)	55	—
112	2019	Mar	Zappa in New York 40th Anniversary Edition	—	—
113	2019	Aug	Orchestral Favorites 40th Anniversary Edition	—	—
114	2019	Oct	Halloween 73 (Costume Box Set containing 4 CDs of both 10.31.73 shows complete, as well as rehearsals from 10.20.73 and 10.21.73) (Note: The elaborately designed package set contains both of Zappa's live sets from that day and a further disc of rehearsal tapes; and features a "costume box" that houses the four CDs and a "FRANKenZAPPA" mask and gloves set.)	—	—
114Z	2019	Oct	Halloween 73 Highlights (Note: A 16-song compilation featuring selections from the two shows.)	—	—
115	2019	Dec	The Hot Rats Sessions	—	—
116	2020	Jun	The Mothers 1970 (with the Mothers of Invention)	30	—
117	2020	Oct	Halloween 81 (Costume Box Set containing 6 CDs of the complete 3 shows: 10.31.81 (2 shows), 11.01.81)	—	—
117Z	2020	Oct	Halloween 81 Highlights	—	—
118	2020	Nov	Zappa - Original Motion Picture Soundtrack	—	—
119	2021	Jun	Zappa '88: The Last U.S. Show	9	—
120	2021	Dec	200 Motels 50th Anniversary Edition	87	—
121	2022	Mar	The Mothers 1971 (with the Mothers of Invention)	18	—
122	2022	Jun	Zappa/Erie	22	—
123	2022	Oct	Zappa '75: Zagreb/Ljubljana	61	—
124	2022	Dec	Waka/Wazoo	—	—
125	2023	Mar	Zappa '80: Mudd Club/Munich	33	—
125A	2023	Mar	Zappa '80: Mudd Club	75	—
125B	2023	Mar	Zappa '80: Munich	—	—
126	2023	Jun	Funky Nothingness	15	—
127	2023	Nov	Over-Nite Sensation 50th Anniversary Edition	—	—
128	2024	Jun	Whisky a Go Go, 1968 (with the Mothers of Invention)	67	—
129	2024	Sep	Apostrophe (') 50th Anniversary Edition	—	—
130	2025	May	Cheaper Than Cheep	14	—
131	2025	Aug	One Size Fits All 50th Anniversary Edition (with the Mothers of Invention)	—	—
132	2025	Oct	Halloween 78 (Costume Box Set containing 5 CDs of 2 complete shows: 10.31.78 and 10.27.78)	55	—
132	2025	Oct	Halloween 78 Highlights: Live at the Palladium, New York	—	—
133	2026	Mar	Bongo Fury 50th Anniversary Edition (with Captain Beefheart and the Mothers of Invention)	—	—
134	2026	May	Zappa '66 Vol. 1: Live at TTG Studios (Note: Featuring 17 recordings (16 of them previously unreleased) from 1966, around the time of the Mothers of Invention's debut album, Freak Out!, this is the first album to be released under the Vaulternative label since 2016's Chicago '78.)	—	—
135	2026	Sep	Freak Out! 60th Anniversary Edition (with the Mothers of Invention)		
136	2026	Dec	Zoot Allures 50th Anniversary Edition		

== Beat the Boots! series ==
Released		Title
1991	Jul	Beat the Boots!
1992	Jun	Beat the Boots! #2
2009	Jan	Beat the Boots! III (Download only)

== AAAFNRAA Birthday Bundle series ==
Released		Title
Year	Month	Title
2006	Dec	The Frank Zappa AAAFNRAA Birthday Bundle 2006 (Download only)
2008	Dec	The Frank Zappa AAAFNRAAA Birthday Bundle 2008 (Download only)
2010	Dec	The Frank Zappa AAAFNRAAAA Birthday Bundle 2010 (Download only)
2011	Dec	The Frank Zappa AAAFNRAAAAAM Birthday Bundle 2011 (Download only)
2014	Dec	The Frank Zappa AAAFNRAA Birthday Bundle 21.12.2014 (Download only)

== Compilation albums ==
Released		Title	Peak chart positions			
Year	Month	Title	US	AUS	GER	UK
1969	Oct	The **** of the Mothers (with the Mothers of Invention)	—	—	—	—
1971	Mar	The Worst of the Mothers (with the Mothers of Invention)	201	—	—	—
1987	Jun	The Guitar World According to Frank Zappa	—	—	—	—
1988	Apr	You Can't Do That on Stage Anymore Sampler	—	—	—	—
1995	Aug	Strictly Commercial	—	63	51	45
1997	May	Strictly Genteel	—	—	—	—
1997	Sep	Zappa En La Radio (Zappa On The Radio)	—	—	—	—
1998	Feb	Cucamonga	—	—	—	—
1998	Apr	Cheap Thrills	—	—	—	—
1999	Apr	Son of Cheep Thrills	—	—	—	—
2020	Dec	A Very Zappa Birthday EP (Download only)	—	—	—	—
"—" denotes a recording that did not chart or was not released in that territory.

== Singles ==
Year	Single (A-side, B-side) Both sides from same album except where indicated	Peak Chart positions								Album
Year	Single (A-side, B-side) Both sides from same album except where indicated	US	US Rock	CAN	GER	SWI	AUT	NOR	SWE	Album
1966	"How Could I Be Such a Fool?" b/w "Help, I'm a Rock (3rd Movement: It Can't Happen' Here)" (both tracks with the Mothers of Invention)	—	—	—	—	—	—	—	—	Freak Out!
1966	"Who Are the Brain Police?" b/w "Trouble Comin' Every Day" (both tracks with the Mothers of Invention)	—	—	—	—	—	—	—	—	Freak Out!
1967	"Big Leg Emma" b/w "Why Don't You Do Me Right?" (both tracks with the Mothers of Invention)	—	—	—	—	—	—	—	—	Non-album tracks (both later included on all CD releases of Absolutely Free)
1967	"Son of Suzy Creamcheese" b/w "Big Leg Emma" (both tracks with the Mothers of Invention)	—	—	—	—	—	—	—	—	Absolutely Free
1967	"Lonely Little Girl" b/w "Mother People" (from We're Only In It for the Money) (both tracks with the Mothers of Invention)	—	—	—	—	—	—	—	—	Non-album version (later included on The Lumpy Money Project/Object, different version on We're Only In It for the Money)
1968	"Motherly Love" b/w "I Ain't Got No Heart" (both tracks with the Mothers of Invention)	—	—	—	—	—	—	—	—	Freak Out!
1968	"Deseri" b/w "Jelly Roll Gum Drop" (both tracks with the Mothers of Invention, credited to Ruben & the Jets)	—	—	—	—	—	—	—	—	Cruising with Ruben & the Jets
1968	"Anyway the Wind Blows" b/w "Jelly Roll Gum Drop" (both tracks with the Mothers of Invention, credited to Ruben & the Jets)	—	—	—	—	—	—	—	—	Cruising with Ruben & the Jets
1969	"WPLJ" b/w "My Guitar" (Non-album track, later included on You Can't Do That On Stage Anymore, Vol. 5) (both tracks with the Mothers of Invention)	—	—	—	—	—	—	—	—	Burnt Weeny Sandwich
1969	"My Guitar" b/w "Dog Breath" (both tracks with the Mothers of Invention)	—	—	—	—	—	—	—	—	Non-album tracks ("My Guitar" later included on You Can't Do That on Stage Anymore, Vol. 5, "Dog Breath" later included on Meat Light)
1970	"Tell Me You Love Me" b/w "Will You Go All the Way for the U.S.A.?" [sic]	—	—	—	—	—	—	—	—	Chunga's Revenge
1971	"Tears Began to Fall" (remix) b/w "Junier Mintz Boogie" (non-album track, later included on The Mothers 1971) (both tracks with the Mothers of Invention)	—	—	—	—	—	—	—	—	Fillmore East – June 1971
1971	"Magic Fingers" b/w "Daddy, Daddy, Daddy"	—	—	—	—	—	—	—	—	200 Motels
1971	"What Will This Evening Bring Me This Morning" b/w "Daddy, Daddy, Daddy"	—	—	—	—	—	—	—	—	200 Motels
1972	"Cletus Awreetus-Awrightus" b/w "Eat That Question" (both tracks with the Mothers of Invention)	—	—	—	—	—	—	—	—	The Grand Wazoo
1973	"I'm the Slime" (single mix with different guitar solo) b/w "Montana" (both tracks with the Mothers of Invention)	—	—	—	—	—	—	—	—	Over-Nite Sensation
1974	"Don't Eat the Yellow Snow" b/w "Cosmik Debris"	86	—	—	—	—	—	—	—	Apostrophe (')
1975	"Du Bist Mein Sofa" b/w "Stink Foot" (from Apostrophe ('))	—	—	—	—	—	—	—	—	One Size Fits All
1976	"Find Her Finer" b/w "Zoot Allures"	—	—	—	—	—	—	—	—	Zoot Allures
1976	"Disco Boy" b/w "Ms. Pinky"	105	—	—	—	—	—	—	—	Zoot Allures
1979	"Dancin' Fool" b/w "Baby Snakes"	45	—	—	—	—	—	—	—	Sheik Yerbouti
1979	"Bobby Brown" b/w "Stick It Out" (from Joe's Garage Acts II & III)	—	—	—	4	5	2	1	1	Sheik Yerbouti
1979	"Joe's Garage" b/w "Central Scrutinizer"	—	—	—	—	—	—	4	14	Joe's Garage Act I
1979	"Stick It Out" b/w "Why Does It Hurt" (from Joe's Garage Act I)	—	—	—	—	—	—	—	—	Joe's Garage Acts II & III
1980	"I Don't Wanna Get Drafted" b/w "Ancient Armaments"	103	—	—	71	—	—	—	3	Non-album tracks (alternate mix of "I Don't Wanna Get Drafted" later included on The Lost Episodes, "Ancient Armaments" later included on Halloween)
1981	"Love of My Life" b/w "For the Young Sophisticate"	—	—	—	—	—	—	—	—	Tinsel Town Rebellion
1981	"Harder Than Your Husband" b/w "Dumb All Over"	—	—	—	—	—	—	—	—	You Are What You Is
1981	"You Are What You Is" b/w "Pink Napkins" (from Shut Up 'n Play Yer Guitar)	—	—	—	—	—	—	—	—	You Are What You Is
1981	"Goblin Girl" b/w "Pink Napkins" (from Shut Up 'n Play Yer Guitar)	—	—	—	—	—	—	—	—	You Are What You Is
1982	"Valley Girl" (with Moon Zappa) b/w "You Are What You Is" (from You Are What You Is)	32	12	18	—	—	—	—	—	Ship Arriving Too Late to Save a Drowning Witch
1983	"The Man from Utopia Meets Mary Lou" b/w "SEX"	—	—	—	—	—	—	—	—	The Man from Utopia
1983	"Cocaine Decisions" b/w "SEX"	—	—	—	—	—	—	—	—	The Man from Utopia
1984	"The Girl in the Magnesium Dress" b/w "Outside Now, Again"	—	—	—	—	—	—	—	—	Boulez Conducts Zappa: The Perfect Stranger
1984	"Baby Take Your Teeth Out" b/w "Stevie's Spanking"	—	—	—	—	—	—	—	—	Them Or Us
1984	True Glove 4-track maxi single ("In France" / "Be In My Video" / "He's So Gay" / "Won Ton On")	—	—	—	—	—	—	—	—	Tracks 1 and 2 from Them Or Us, track 3 from Thing-Fish, track 4 non-album version (different version on Thing-Fish)
1987	"Peaches en Regalia" b/w "I'm Not Satisfied" (from Crusing with Ruben & the Jets) and "Lucille Has Messed My Mind Up" (from Joe's Garage Act I)	—	—	—	—	—	—	—	—	Hot Rats
1988	"Sexual Harassment in the Workplace" b/w "Watermelon in Easter Hay"	—	—	—	—	—	—	—	—	Guitar
1988	"Zomby Woof" b/w "You Didn't Try to Call Me"	—	—	—	—	—	—	—	—	You Can't Do That on Stage Anymore, Vol. 1
1991	"Stairway to Heaven" b/w "Bolero"	—	—	—	—	9	—	—	—	The Best Band You Never Heard in Your Life
2022	"Valley Girl (Flux Pavilion Remix)" (with Moon Zappa)	—	—	—	—	—	—	—	—	Non-album track (remix of "Valley Girl" from Ship Arriving Too Late to Save a Drowning Witch)
"—" denotes releases that did not chart.

== Videos ==
- Frank Zappa's 200 Motels (Cinema 1971, VHS 1984, DVD 2009)
- A Token of His Extreme (TV 1976, DVD 2013)
- Baby Snakes (Cinema 1979, VHS - edited version 1983, VHS - complete version 1987, DVD 2003)
- Live at the Palladium / The Torture Never Stops (TV 1981, VHS 1983, DVD 2008)
- The Dub Room Special! (VHS 1982, DVD 2005)
- Does Humor Belong in Music? (VHS 1985, DVD 2003)
- Video from Hell (VHS 1987)
- Uncle Meat (VHS 1987)
- The True Story of Frank Zappa's 200 Motels (VHS 1987)
- The Amazing Mr. Bickford (VHS 1987)
- Roxy the Movie (DVD/BD 2015)
- Zappa (Cinema 2020, DVD/BD 2021)
- Cheaper Than Cheep (BD 2025 - available as part of Cheaper Than Cheep 2CD+BD or 2CD+3LP+BD)

== Other appearances ==
- The Masters - "Breaktime", B-side of "Sixteen Tons", Zappa wrote and performed on the B-side (Emmy, 1961)
- The Hollywood Tornadoes - "The Inebriated Surfer", B-side of "Moon Dawg", Zappa produced the B-side (Aertaun, 1962)
- The Penguins - "Memories of El Monte", writer and arranger (Original Sound, 1963)
- Bob Guy - "Dear Jeepers", B-side "Letter from Jeepers", writer, arranger and producer (Del-Fi, 1963)
- Baby Ray & the Ferns - "The World's Greatest Sinner", B-side "How's Your Bird?", writer, performer and producer with Ray Collins on vocals (Donna, 1963)
- The Persuaders - "Grunion Run", B-side of "Tijuana Surf", Zappa wrote and performed on the B-side (Original Sound, 1963; reissued the same year on Regency under the name the Hollywood Persuaders with "Tijuana Surf" retitled "Tijuana")
- Brian Lord & the Midnighters - "The Big Surfer", performer and producer (Vigah!, 1963 also issued on Capitol Records)
- Ned & Nelda - "Hey Nelda", B-side "Surf Along with Ned & Nelda", written and performed by Zappa (Ned) and Ray Collins (Nelda) (Vigah!, 1963)
- Ron Roman - "Love of My Life", B-side of "Tell Me", Zappa wrote and performed on the B-side with Ray Collins on vocals (Daani, 1963)
- The Rotations - "Heavies", B-side "The Crusher", producer only (Original Sound, 1964), a few seconds of "Heavies" appears in "Nasal Retentive Calliope Music" on We're Only in It for the Money
- The Heartbreakers - "Every Time I See You", B-side "Cradle Rock", writer and performer (Del-Fi, 1964)
- Mr. Clean - "Mr. Clean", B-side "Jessie Lee", writer, performer and producer (Original Sound, 1964)
- Bobby Jameson - "Gotta Find My Roogalator", B-side "Reconsider Baby", Zappa uncredited (Penthouse, 1966)
- The Animals - Animalism, writer and arranger (MGM, 1966)
- Burt Ward - "Boy Wonder I Love You", writer, producer and arranger (MGM, 1966)
- Barry Goldberg - "Carry On" (Verve/Folkways, 1967)
- Wild Man Fischer - An Evening with Wild Man Fischer, writer, performer and producer (Bizzare/Reprise, 1968)
- The GTOs - Permanent Damage, producer only (Straight/Reprise, 1969)
- Captain Beefheart - Trout Mask Replica, producer and can be heard speaking on "Pena" and "The Blimp"; the backing track of "The Blimp" is the Mothers of Invention rehearsing a Zappa song known as "Charles Ives" (Reprise, 1969)
- Lenny Bruce - The Berkeley Concert, producer only, recorded 1965 (Bizarre/Reprise, 1969)
- Jeff Simmons - Lucille Has Messed My Mind Up, writer, performer and producer (Straight, 1970)
- Jean-Luc Ponty - King Kong: Jean-Luc Ponty Plays the Music of Frank Zappa, writer, performer and producer (World Pacific/Liberty, 1970)
- John Lennon - Some Time in New York City, writer and performer (Apple, 1972)
- Ruben and the Jets - For Real!, writer, performer and producer (Mercury, 1973)
- George Duke - Feel, credited as Obdewl'l X (Verve, 1974)
- Grand Funk Railroad - Good Singin', Good Playin', performer and producer (MCA, 1976)
- Robert Charlebois - Swing Charlebois Swing (Solution/RCA France, 1977)
- Flint - Flint (Columbia, 1978)
- L. Shankar - Touch Me There, credited as Stucco Homes, performer and producer (Zappa, 1979)
- Dweezil Zappa - Havin' a Bad Day, producer only (Barking Pumpkin, 1986)
- Pražský výběr - Adieu C. A. (Art Production K, 1992)
- Lowell George & the Factory - Lightning-Rod Man, performer and producer on "Lightning-Rod Man" and "The Loved One", both recorded 1966 (Edsel, 1993)
- Captain Beefheart - Bat Chain Puller, producer only, recorded 1976 (Vaulternative, 2012)

== Albums by other artists ==
- Jean-Luc Ponty - King Kong: Jean-Luc Ponty Plays the Music of Frank Zappa (1970)
- BRT Big Band - The BRT Big Band Plays Frank Zappa (1990)
- Yahonza - Yahozna Plays Zappa (1992)
- Joel Thome/Orchestra of Our Time - Zappa's Universe — A Celebration of 25 Years of Frank Zappa's Music (1993)
- Meridian Arts Ensemble - Smart Went Crazy (1993)
- Harmonia Ensemble - Harmonia Meets Zappa (1994)
- Jon Poole - What's the Ugliest Part of Your Body? (1994)
- Omnibus Wind Ensemble - Music by Frank Zappa (1995)
- Warren Cuccurullo - Thanks to Frank (1995)
- Meridian Arts Ensemble - Prime Meridian (1995)
- Meridian Arts Ensemble - Anxiety of Influence (1996)
- Muffin Men - Frankincense: The Muffin Men Play Zappa (1997)
- The Ed Palermo Big Band - Plays the Music of Frank Zappa (1997)
- CoCö Anderson - Dischordancies Abundant (1997)
- Various Artists - UNMATCHED - Evangelio 2⁰ - TRIBUTO A ZAPPA (1997)
- Pierre-Jean Gaucher - Zappe Zappa (1998)
- Meridian Arts Ensemble - Ear Mind I (1998)
- Ossi Duri - Sta Chitarra Ammazzera 'Tua Madre (1998)
- The Persuasions - Frankly a Cappella (2000)
- Ensemble Ambrosius - The Zappa Album (2000)
- Bohuslän Big Band - Bohuslän Big Band plays Frank Zappa (2000)
- Nasal Retentive Orchestra - Fric Out ! (2001)
- Nasal Retentive Orchestra - Have a Bun (2002)
- Le Concert Impromptu & Bossini - Prophetic Attitude (2002)
- Ensemble Modern - Ensemble Modern Plays Frank Zappa: Greggery Peccary & Other Persuasions (2003)
- UMO Jazz Orchestra - UMO plays Frank Zappa feat. Marzi Nyman (2003)
- Nasal Retentive Orchestra - Tales of Brave Flegmar (2003)
- LeBocal - Oh No!... Just Another Frank Zappa Memorial Barbecue! (2003)
- Prząśniczki & Tymon Tymański - Zapparcie, czyli uboczne skutki jedzenia żółtego śniegu (2003)
- BRTN Philharmonic Orchestra & Zucchini Rocking Teenage Combo - The Purple Cucumber - A Zappa Tribute (2003)
- Nasal Retentive Orchestra - NRO Live (2004)
- Lemme Take You to the Beach: Surf Instrumental Bands Playing the Music of Zappa (2005)
- Colin Towns and the NDR bigband - Frank Zappa's Hot Licks (and Funny Smells) (2005)
- Marc Guillermont - Zappostrophe (2005)
- The Ed Palermo Big Band - Take Your Clothes Off When You Dance (2006)
- Nasal Retentive Orchestra - Music for Hungry People (2007)
- Struber Z'Tett - Struber Z'Tett Plays Zappa Live : Les Noces de Dada (2007)
- Pierre-Jean Gaucher & Christophe Godin - 2G (2007)
- Dweezil Zappa - Zappa Plays Zappa (2008)
- The Ed Palermo Big Band - Eddy Loves Frank (2009)
- The Norwegian Wind Ensemble - The Brass from Utopia (A Frank Zappa Tribute) (2013)
- The Norwegian Radio Orchestra - Perfect Strangers (Heiner Goebbels, Frank Zappa) (2014)
- Stefano Bollani - Sheik Yer Zappa (2014)
- Marco Pacassoni Group - Frank & Ruth (2018)

== Videos by other artists ==
- Joel Thome/Orchestra of Our Time - Zappa's Universe — A Celebration of 25 Years of Frank Zappa's Music (VHS 1993)
- Dweezil Zappa - Zappa Plays Zappa (DVD 2007)
- Quintorigo con Roberto Gatto - Around Zappa (Live at Blue Note Milano) (DVD 2015)

== Sales awards ==
- Australia (70,000 sales)
  - January 1976: Gold record for Just Another Band From LA
  - January 1976: Gold record for Fillmore East
- Austria (50,000 sales)
  - November 1991: Gold record for "Bobby Brown"
- Canada (100,000 sales)
  - September 1979: Gold record for Sheik Yerbouti
  - November 1979: Gold record for Joe's Garage
- European Union (1,000,000 sales)
  - 1991: Gold record for European releases
- France (100,000 sales)
  - December 1979: Gold record for Sheik Yerbouti
- Germany (500,000 sales)
  - January 1980: Gold record for Sheik Yerbouti
  - January 1980: Gold record for "Bobby Brown"
- Norway (50,000 sales)
  - January 1980: Gold record for "Bobby Brown"
- Sweden (50,000 sales)
  - October 1993: Gold record for "Bobby Brown"
- Switzerland (50,000 sales)
  - December 1980: Gold record for "Bobby Brown"
- United Kingdom (60,000 sales)
  - March 1979: Silver record for Zoot Allures
- United States (1,100,000 sales)
  - April 1976: Gold record for Apostrophe (')
  - November 1976: Gold record for Over-Nite Sensation
  - June 2006: Gold record for Does Humor Belong in Music? video
  - February 2015: Gold record for Baby Snakes video
