= Halloween 81 =

Box set by Frank Zappa
- Released: October 2, 2020
- Recorded: October 31 – November 1, 1981
- Venues: The Palladium, NYC
- Genres: Comedy rock; experimental rock; jazz-fusion; progressive rock
- Length: 417:17 6CD; 76:43 Highlights CD
- Label: Zappa Records
- Producers: Ahmet Zappa; Joe Travers

Frank Zappa chronology
The Mothers 1970 (2020)	Halloween 81 (2020)	Zappa (2020)

Halloween 81 is a live box set by Frank Zappa released posthumously on October 2, 2020. It is a compilation of live material in six CDs. Recorded between October 29 and November 1, 1981, it is the third album released in the Halloween box set series of live concerts that Frank Zappa performed yearly for Halloween. The live concert was the first live simulcast in cable history. It was also broadcast over the then-recently launched channel MTV. Material from these shows was used in later projects, such as the videos The Dub Room Special and The Torture Never Stops.

== Track listing ==
Disc one - 10/31/81 8PM Show
No.	Title	Length
1.	"Chunga's Revenge"	5:30
2.	"“The Finest Night of the Year”"	3:05
3.	"You Are What You Is - Take 1"	1:13
4.	"You Are What You Is - Take 2"	3:46
5.	"Mudd Club"	2:53
6.	"The Meek Shall Inherit Nothing"	3:13
7.	"Dumb All Over"	5:42
8.	"Heavenly Bank Account"	4:06
9.	"Suicide Chump"	5:43
10.	"Jumbo Go Away"	3:53
11.	"Envelopes"	3:08
12.	"Drowning Witch"	8:46
13.	"What’s New in Baltimore?"	3:48
14.	"Moggio"	2:45
15.	"We’re Turning Again"	5:04
16.	"Alien Orifice"	5:20
Total length:		69:09

Disc two - 8PM Show Continued
No.	Title	Length
1.	"Teen-age Prostitute"	2:32
2.	"Flakes"	5:14
3.	"Broken Hearts Are for Assholes"	4:10
4.	"The Blue Light"	4:46
5.	"Tinsel Town Rebellion"	4:56
6.	"Yo Mama"	9:46
7.	"Bobby Brown Goes Down"	2:40
8.	"City of Tiny Lites"	9:40
9.	"“We’re Not Gonna Stand for It!”"	1:53
10.	"Strictly Genteel"	7:30
11.	"Dancin’ Fool"	3:44
12.	"Whipping Post"	7:06
Total length:		63:47

Disc three - 10/31/81 12AM Show
No.	Title	Length
1.	"Black Napkins"	5:09
2.	"“A Historical Event”"	2:03
3.	"Montana"	3:48
4.	"Easy Meat"	6:50
5.	"Society Pages"	2:33
6.	"I’m a Beautiful Guy"	1:55
7.	"Beauty Knows No Pain"	2:56
8.	"Charlie’s Enormous Mouth"	3:40
9.	"Fine Girl"	3:13
10.	"Teen-age Wind"	3:01
11.	"Harder Than Your Husband"	2:35
12.	"Bamboozled by Love"	5:32
13.	"Sinister Footwear II"	6:55
14.	"Stevie’s Spanking"	6:09
15.	"Commercial Break"	1:55
Total length:		59:31

Disc four - 12AM Show Continued
No.	Title	Length
1.	"Cocaine Decisions"	3:46
2.	"Nig Biz"	5:12
3.	"Doreen"	2:07
4.	"Goblin Girl"	1:49
5.	"The Black Page #2"	7:06
6.	"Tryin’ to Grow a Chin"	2:29
7.	"Strictly Genteel"	7:46
8.	"The Torture Never Stops"	11:48
9.	"“The Real Show Keeps Going”"	1:10
10.	"Joe’s Garage"	2:30
11.	"Why Does It Hurt When I Pee?"	2:48
12.	"The Illinois Enema Bandit"	9:23
13.	"“The Halloween Tradition”"	2:32
14.	"King Kong"	11:07
15.	"Auld Lang Syne"	1:52
Total length:		73:45

Disc five - 11-01-81 Show
No.	Title	Length
1.	"Zoot Allures"	7:17
2.	"“The Last of Our Halloween Shows""	2:59
3.	"I'm the Slime"	2:39
4.	"Pound for a Brown"	10:02
5.	"Dave & Al"	5:20
6.	"Cosmik Debris"	4:05
7.	"Montana"	3:47
8.	"Easy Meat"	7:39
9.	"Dumb All Over"	6:34
10.	"Heavenly Bank Account"	4:03
11.	"Suicide Chump"	5:43
12.	"Jumbo Go Away"	3:50
13.	"Envelopes"	2:56
14.	"Drowning Witch"	9:57
Total length:		76:20

Disc six - 11-01-81 Show Continued
No.	Title	Length
1.	"What’s New in Baltimore?"	4:59
2.	"Moggio"	2:40
3.	"We’re Turning Again"	5:02
4.	"Alien Orifice"	5:13
5.	"Teen-age Prostitute"	2:34
6.	"Sinister Footwear II"	6:29
7.	"Stevie’s Spanking"	6:34
8.	"Cocaine Decisions"	3:40
9.	"Nig Biz"	5:06
10.	"Goblin Girl"	2:25
11.	"The Black Page #2"	8:25
12.	"Whipping Post"	7:18
13.	"Broken Hearts Are for Assholes"	4:09
14.	"The Torture Never Stops"	12:19
Total length:		79:03

Halloween 81 Highlights
No.	Title	Length
1.	"Chunga's Revenge"	5:30
2.	"The Finest Night of the Year"	2:50
3.	"I'm the Slime"	2:37
4.	"Montana"	3:48
5.	"Easy Meat"	7:40
6.	"Joe's Garage"	2:30
7.	"Why Does It Hurt When I Pee?"	2:27
8.	"Sinister Footwear II"	6:55
9.	"Stevie's Spanking"	6:30
10.	"Goblin Girl"	2:25
11.	"The Black Page #2"	9:00
12.	"Strictly Genteel"	6:33
13.	"Whipping Post"	6:59
14.	"The Torture Never Stops"	10:59

== Personnel ==
- Frank Zappa – lead guitar, vocals, baton
- Ray White – rhythm guitar, vocals
- Steve Vai – stunt guitar, vocals
- Tommy Mars – keyboards, vocals
- Robert Martin – keyboards, saxophone, vocals
- Ed Mann – percussion, vocals
- Scott Thunes – bass guitar, vocals
- Chad Wackerman – drums
