= Hammersmith Odeon (album) =

Live album by Frank Zappa
- Released: November 6, 2010
- Recorded: January 25–27 & February 28, 1978
- Venues: Hammersmith Odeon (London, UK)
- Genre: Rock
- Length: 174:02
- Label: Vaulternative Records
- Producers: Frank Zappa; Gail Zappa; Joe Travers

Frank Zappa chronology
Congress Shall Make No Law... (2010)	Hammersmith Odeon (2010)	Feeding the Monkies at Ma Maison (2011)

Professional ratings
Review scores
Source	Rating
All About Jazz	(very favourable)
AllMusic	4.5/5 stars

Hammersmith Odeon is a triple album by Frank Zappa, recorded on January 25, 26 & 27, 1978 and February 28, 1978, and released posthumously in 2010 by the Zappa Family Trust. It is the fifth installment on the Vaulternative Records label that is dedicated to the posthumous release of complete Zappa concerts, following the releases of FZ:OZ (2002), Buffalo (2007), Wazoo (2007) and Philly '76 (2009).

== History ==
Frank Zappa played London's Hammersmith Odeon five times in 1978: on 24, 25, 26 & 27 January 1978 and on 28 February 1978.

The 25, 26 & 27 January 1978 and 28 February 1978 concerts provided the source for the basic tracks for Zappa's 1979 album Sheik Yerbouti.

The Hammersmith Odeon 3-CD set was designed to celebrate Frank Zappa's 70th birthday on 21 December 2010. Mixed in NYC by Frank Filipetti, none of the tracks have been previously released and the track listing mirrors and/or parallels the set lists of the concerts.

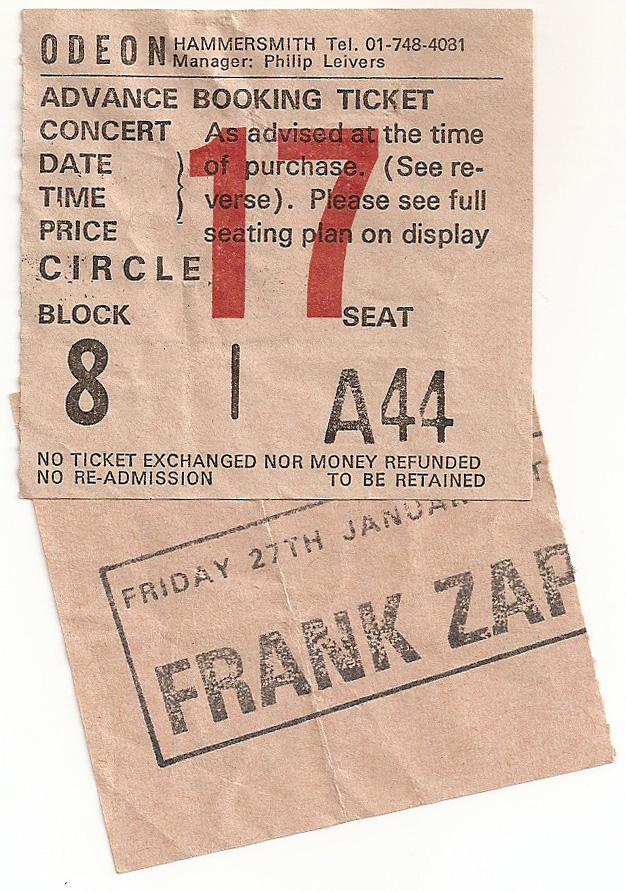
Ticket stub from one of the nights featured on the CD

== Track listing ==
Disc one
No.	Title	Date performed	Length
1.	"Convocation/The Purple Lagoon"	January 27, 1978	2:18
2.	"Dancin' Fool"	January 27, 1978	3:43
3.	"Peaches en Regalia"	February 28, 1978	2:36
4.	"The Torture Never Stops"	February 28, 1978	13:52
5.	"Tryin' to Grow a Chin"	February 28, 1978	3:37
6.	"City of Tiny Lites"	February 28, 1978	7:01
7.	"Baby Snakes"	February 28, 1978	1:54
8.	"Pound for a Brown"	February 28, 1978	20:39
Total length:			55:40

Disc two
No.	Title	Date performed	Length
1.	"I Have Been in You"	January 26, 1978	13:55
2.	"Flakes"	February 28, 1978	6:39
3.	"Broken Hearts Are for Assholes"	February 28, 1978	3:54
4.	"Punky's Whips"	January 26, 1978	10:26
5.	"Titties 'n Beer"	January 26, 1978	4:49
6.	"Audience Participation"	January 26, 1978	3:32
7.	"The Black Page #2"	January 26, 1978	2:49
8.	"Jones Crusher"	January 25, 1978	3:01
9.	"The Little House I Used to Live In"	January 25, 1978	7:13
Total length:			56:18

Disc three
No.	Title	Date performed	Length
1.	"Dong Work for Yuda"	January 25, 1978	2:56
2.	"Bobby Brown Goes Down"	January 26, 1978	4:54
3.	"Envelopes"	January 26, 1978	2:16
4.	"Terry Firma"	January 26, 1978	4:10
5.	"Disco Boy"	January 26, 1978	6:43
6.	"King Kong"	February 28, 1978	10:10
7.	"Watermelon in Easter Hay (Prequel)"	January 27, 1978	3:55
8.	"Dinah-Moe Humm"	January 26, 1978	6:10
9.	"Camarillo Brillo"	January 26, 1978	3:23
10.	"Muffin Man"	January 26, 1978	6:18
11.	"Black Napkins"	January 25, 1978	5:16
12.	"San Ber'dino"	January 25, 1978	5:54
Total length:			62:05

== Personnel ==
- Frank Zappa – lead guitar, vocals
- Adrian Belew – guitar, vocals
- Tommy Mars – keyboards, vocals
- Peter Wolf – keyboards
- Patrick O'Hearn – bass, vocals
- Terry Bozzio – drums, vocals
- Ed Mann – percussion
