= Halloween 77 =

Live album by Frank Zappa
- Released: October 31, 2017
- Recorded: October 28–31, 1977
- Venue: Palladium (New York City)
- Genre: Progressive rock
- Length: 208:57 (3CD); 945:29 (Digital)
- Label: Zappa Records
- Producer: Joe Travers

Frank Zappa chronology
Little Dots (2016)	Halloween 77 (2017)	The Roxy Performances (2018)

Professional ratings
Review scores
Source	Rating
AllMusic	3.5/5 stars

Halloween 77 is a live album by Frank Zappa, released in October 2017, consisting of six recordings of shows performed in late October 1977 at the Palladium in New York City. Portions of the October 29th, 30th and 31st concerts were previously released on the album Sheik Yerbouti and in the film Baby Snakes, both released in 1979.

It was released as a USB containing 24-bit WAV audio and as a 3-CD box set, containing a total of 158 tracks. The USB box set was designed to resemble a Halloween mask package containing a mask of Zappa's likeness. This format was replicated for the follow-up releases Halloween 73 (2019), Halloween 81 (2020) and Halloween 78 (2025).

== Track listing ==
=== Digital Version ===
All tracks are written by Frank Zappa.

First show - 10-28-77 (early)
No.	Title	Prior Release	Length
1.	"10-28-77 Show 1 Start/Introductions"		3:28
2.	"Peaches en Regalia"		2:42
3.	"The Torture Never Stops"		13:05
4.	"Trying to Grow a Chin"		3:37
5.	"City of Tiny Lites"		6:04
6.	"Pound for a Brown"		8:05
7.	"Bobby Brown Goes Down"		4:33
8.	"Conehead (Instrumental)"		9:19
9.	"Flakes"		4:03
10.	"Big Leg Emma"		1:47
11.	"Envelopes"		2:29
12.	"Terry's Solo #1"		4:42
13.	"Disco Boy"		3:53
14.	"Läther"		3:36
15.	"Wild Love"	same performance as "Bowling on Charen" from Trance-Fusion (guitar solo only)	24:05
16.	"Tittie's 'n Beer"		7:16
17.	"Audience Participation #1"		0:48
18.	"The Black Page #2"		3:02
19.	"Jones Crusher"		2:48
20.	"Broken Hearts Are for Assholes"		3:52
21.	"Punky's Whips"		9:43
22.	"Encore Audience #1"		1:21
23.	"Dinah-Moe Humm"		4:55
24.	"Camarillo Brillo"		3:35
25.	"Muffin Man"		4:36
Total length:			137:24

Second show - 10-28-77 (late) [previously unreleased]
No.	Title	Length
1.	"10-28-77 Show 2 Start/Introductions"	3:13
2.	"Peaches en Regalia"	2:42
3.	"The Torture Never Stops"	12:33
4.	"Trying to Grow a Chin"	3:37
5.	"City of Tiny Lites"	8:00
6.	"Pound for a Brown"	9:19
7.	"Bobby Brown Goes Down"	5:36
8.	"Conehead (Instrumental)"	9:18
9.	"Flakes"	4:10
10.	"Big Leg Emma"	1:48
11.	"Envelopes"	2:33
12.	"Terry's Solo #2"	4:17
13.	"Disco Boy"	3:54
14.	"Läther"	3:42
15.	"Wild Love"	26:01
16.	"Tittie's 'n Beer"	7:50
17.	"Audience Participation #2"	2:37
18.	"The Black Page #2"	3:14
19.	"Jones Crusher"	2:58
20.	"Broken Hearts Are for Assholes"	3:54
21.	"Punky's Whips"	9:51
22.	"Encore Audience #2"	2:13
23.	"Dinah-Moe Humm"	4:01
24.	"Camarillo Brillo"	3:36
25.	"Muffin Man"	6:20
Total length:		147:17

Third show - 10-29-77 (early) [previously unreleased]
No.	Title	Length
1.	"10-29-77 Show 1 Start/Introductions"	4:06
2.	"Peaches en Regalia"	2:42
3.	"The Torture Never Stops"	12:59
4.	"Trying to Grow a Chin"	3:34
5.	"City of Tiny Lites"	7:15
6.	"Pound for a Brown"	8:26
7.	"Bobby Brown Goes Down"	6:06
8.	"Conehead (Instrumental)"	5:50
9.	"Flakes"	3:53
10.	"Big Leg Emma"	1:52
11.	"Envelopes"	2:42
12.	"Terry's Solo #3"	3:51
13.	"Disco Boy"	3:57
14.	"Läther"	3:40
15.	"Wild Love"	22:51
16.	"Tittie's 'n Beer"	6:01
17.	"Audience Participation #3"	2:42
18.	"The Black Page #2"	3:05
19.	"Jones Crusher"	2:53
20.	"Broken Hearts Are for Assholes"	3:50
21.	"Punky's Whips"	9:18
22.	"Encore Audience #3"	1:46
23.	"Dinah-Moe Humm"	5:12
24.	"Camarillo Brillo"	3:29
25.	"Muffin Man"	5:09
Total length:		137:09

Fourth show - 10-29-77 (late) [previously unreleased]
No.	Title	Length
1.	"10-28-77 Show 2 Start/Introductions"	4:21
2.	"Peaches en Regalia"	2:42
3.	"The Torture Never Stops"	11:30
4.	"Trying to Grow a Chin"	3:36
5.	"City of Tiny Lites"	7:01
6.	"Pound for a Brown"	9:05
7.	"Bobby Brown Goes Down"	9:12
8.	"Conehead (Instrumental)"	6:29
9.	"Flakes"	3:28
10.	"Big Leg Emma"	1:49
11.	"Envelopes"	2:52
12.	"Terry's Solo #4"	4:07
13.	"Disco Boy"	3:54
14.	"Läther"	3:56
15.	"Wild Love"	27:33
16.	"Tittie's 'n Beer"	8:12
17.	"Audience Participation #4"	5:02
18.	"The Black Page #2"	2:57
19.	"Jones Crusher"	2:49
20.	"Broken Hearts Are for Assholes"	3:48
21.	"Punky's Whips"	9:36
22.	"Encore Audience #4"	2:23
23.	"Dinah-Moe Humm"	6:19
24.	"Camarillo Brillo"	3:30
25.	"Muffin Man"	6:02
Total length:		152:13

Fifth show - 10-30-77
No.	Title	Prior Release	Length
1.	"10-30-77 Show Start/Introductions"		1:40
2.	"Stink-Foot"		7:45
3.	"The Poodle Lecture"	same performance as You Can't Do That on Stage Anymore, Vol. 6	5:10
4.	"Dirty Love"		2:32
5.	"Peaches en Regalia"		2:40
6.	"The Torture Never Stops"		12:53
7.	"Tryin’ to Grow a Chin"		3:32
8.	"City of Tiny Lites"		7:36
9.	"Pound for a Brown"		10:03
10.	"I Have Been in You"	same performance as You Can't Do That on Stage Anymore, Vol. 6, including "Is That Guy Kidding or What?" (spoken intro)	8:35
11.	"Dancin' Fool (World Premiere)"		4:50
12.	"Jewish Princess (Prototype)"	same performance as Sheik Yerbouti and Have I Offended Someone?, with overdubs	4:41
13.	"King Kong"		8:45
14.	"Terry's Solo #5"		5:07
15.	"Disco Boy"		4:01
16.	"Envelopes"		2:19
17.	"A Halloween Treat with Thomas Nordegg"		6:17
18.	"Läther"		3:47
19.	"Wild Love"		25:19
20.	"Titties 'n Beer"		7:01
21.	"Audience Participation #5"		8:28
22.	"The Black Page #2"		2:59
23.	"Jones Crusher"		2:53
24.	"Broken Hearts Are for Assoles"		3:52
25.	"Punky's Whips"		12:36
26.	"Encore Rap"		1:11
27.	"Dinah-Moe Humm"		6:06
28.	"Camarillo Brillo"		3:27
29.	"Muffin Man"		5:18
30.	"San Ber'dino"		6:20
Total length:			187:43

Sixth show - 10-31-77
No.	Title	Prior Release	Length
1.	"10-31-77 Show Start/Introductions"		3:11
2.	"Peaches en Regalia"		2:42
3.	"The Torture Never Stops"		13:54
4.	"Trying to Grow a Chin"	same performance as You Can't Do That on Stage Anymore, Vol. 6	3:35
5.	"City of Tiny Lites"		8:17
6.	"Pound for a Brown"		13:40
7.	"The Demise of the Imported Rubber Goods Mask"		8:33
8.	"Bobby Brown Goes Down"		3:49
9.	"Conehead (Instrumental)"		8:21
10.	"Flakes"		3:04
11.	"Big Leg Emma"		1:58
12.	"Envelopes"		2:25
13.	"Terry's Halloween Solo"		4:38
14.	"Disco Boy"		3:55
15.	"Läther"		3:58
16.	"Wild Love"		30:11
17.	"Tittie's 'n Beer"		7:24
18.	"Halloween Audience Participation"		7:04
19.	"The Black Page #2"		2:55
20.	"Jones Crusher"	same performance as Sheik Yerbouti, with overdubs	2:58
21.	"Broken Hearts Are for Assholes"		3:52
22.	"Punky's Whips"		11:23
23.	"Halloween Encore Audience"		2:07
24.	"Dinah-Moe Humm"		6:41
25.	"Camarillo Brillo"		3:24
26.	"Muffin Man"		5:21
27.	"San Ber'dino"		5:01
28.	"Black Napkins"		9:19
Total length:			183:43

=== 3CD Version ===
Disc one - (10-31-77 Show)
No.	Title	Length
1.	"10-31-77 Show Start/Introductions"	3:11
2.	"Peaches en Regalia"	2:42
3.	"The Torture Never Stops"	13:54
4.	"Trying to Grow a Chin"	3:35
5.	"City of Tiny Lites"	8:17
6.	"Pound for a Brown"	13:40
7.	"The Demise of the Imported Rubber Goods Mask"	8:33
8.	"Bobby Brown Goes Down"	3:49
9.	"Conehead (Instrumental)"	8:21
10.	"Flakes"	3:04
11.	"Big Leg Emma"	1:58
Total length:		71:04

Disc two - 10-31-77 Show
No.	Title	Length
1.	"Envelopes"	2:25
2.	"Terry's Halloween Solo"	4:38
3.	"Disco Boy"	3:55
4.	"Läther"	3:58
5.	"Wild Love"	30:11
6.	"Tittie's 'n Beer"	7:24
7.	"Halloween Audience Participation"	7:04
8.	"The Black Page #2"	2:55
9.	"Jones Crusher"	2:58
10.	"Broken Hearts Are for Assholes"	3:52
Total length:		69:20

Disc three - 10-31-77 Show
No.	Title	Length
1.	"Punky's Whips"	11:23
2.	"Halloween Encore Audience"	2:07
3.	"Dinah-Moe Humm"	6:41
4.	"Camarillo Brillo"	3:24
5.	"Muffin Man"	5:21
6.	"San Ber'dino"	5:01
7.	"Black Napkins"	9:19

10-30-77 Show Bonus Tracks
No.	Title	Length
8.	"King Kong"	8:17
9.	"A Halloween Treat with Thomas Nordegg"	6:15
10.	"Audience Participation #5"	7:46
11.	"The Black Page #2"	2:59
Total length:		68:33

== Personnel ==
Players

- Frank Zappa – guitar, vocals
- Adrian Belew – guitar, vocals
- Tommy Mars – keyboards, vocals
- Peter Wolf – keyboards
- Patrick O'Hearn – bass
- Terry Bozzio – drums, vocals
- Ed Mann – percussion

Special Guests

- Roy Estrada – gas mask, vocals on "Dinah Moe-Humm" (10-29-77 early show), "Jewish Princess (Prototype)", "King Kong", "A Halloween Treat with Thomas Nordegg", "Audience Participation #5", and "The Demise of the Imported Rubber Goods Mask"
- Thomas Nordegg – "some magic tricks" on "A Halloween Treat with Thomas Nordegg"
- Phil Kaufman – "human trombone" on "King Kong"

Technical

- Frank Zappa – original recording producer
- Kerry McNabb – original recording engineer
- Ahmet Zappa – release producer
- Joe Travers – release producer, digital transfers
- Craig Parker Adams – 2016 re-mix, audio restoration and mastering engineer
