= Zappa '80 Mudd Club/Munich =

Zappa '80: Mudd Club/Munich

Live album by Frank Zappa
- Released: March 3, 2023
- Recorded: May 8, 1980; July 3, 1980
- Venue: Mudd Club, NYC, USA; Olympiahalle, Munich, Germany
- Genre: Experimental rock; jazz-fusion; progressive rock
- Length: 163:50 3CD; 56:45 Mudd Club 2LP; 107:05 Munich 3LP
- Label: Zappa Records
- Producer: Ahmet Zappa; Joe Travers

Frank Zappa chronology
| Waka/Wazoo (2022) | Zappa '80: Mudd Club/Munich (2023) | Funky Nothingness (2023) |

Zappa '80: Mudd Club/Munich is a live album by Frank Zappa, released posthumously on March 3, 2023. It is a 3CD set that contains two complete shows recorded during the tour of the spring and summer of 1980.

== Background ==
The first of the two shows was performed at the Mudd Club nightclub in New York City, on May 8. The setlist features songs that would be frequented throughout 1980, as well as early versions of tracks that would later appear on the album You Are What You Is (1981) including "The Meek Shall Inherit Nothing", the title track, and Zappa's homage to the club itself, "Mudd Club". The second show was performed at the Olympiahalle in Munich, Germany, much later in the tour on July 3.

Mudd Club/Munich is the first official release that would showcase the 5-piece band (significantly reduced from the previous tour's 8-piece) that would only be on tour for a few months. It is also the only lineup to feature drummer David Logeman, who was briefly stepping in for Vinnie Colaiuta. Much of the material on the album is previously unreleased, with the exception of "You Didn't Try to Call Me" from the Munich show and "Love of My Life" from the Mudd Club show, which appear on the albums You Can't Do That on Stage Anymore, Vol. 1 (1988) and You Can't Do That on Stage Anymore, Vol. 4 (1991), respectively.

== Track listing ==
All tracks are written by Frank Zappa, except where noted.

Disc one - Mudd Club New York, NY May 8th, 1980
| No. | Title | Length |
|---|---|---|
| 1. | "Mudd Club Show Start" | 1:03 |
| 2. | "Chunga’s Revenge" | 4:03 |
| 3. | "Keep It Greasy" | 3:03 |
| 4. | "Outside Now" | 5:55 |
| 5. | "City Of Tiny Lites" (Edited) | 6:39 |
| 6. | "Pound For A Brown" | 3:46 |
| 7. | "You Are What You Is" | 3:46 |
| 8. | "You Didn’t Try To Call Me" | 3:46 |
| 9. | "I Ain’t Got No Heart" | 2:07 |
| 10. | "Love Of My Life" | 2:11 |
| 11. | "Easy Meat" | 7:25 |
| 12. | "Mudd Club" | 3:35 |
| 13. | "The Meek Shall Inherit Nothing" | 3:15 |
| 14. | "Joe’s Garage" | 2:25 |
| 15. | "Why Does It Hurt When I Pee?" | 3:46 |
| Total length: | | 56:45 |

Disc two - Munich, Germany Olympiahalle July 3rd, 1980
| No. | Title | Length |
|---|---|---|
| 1. | "Munich ’80 Show Start" | 0:56 |
| 2. | "Chunga’s Revenge" | 7:14 |
| 3. | "Keep It Greasy" | 3:09 |
| 4. | "Pick Me, I’m Clean" | 6:45 |
| 5. | "City Of Tiny Lites" | 9:11 |
| 6. | "Pound For A Brown" | 13:33 |
| 7. | "Cosmik Debris" | 4:11 |
| 8. | "You Didn’t Try To Call Me" | 3:39 |
| 9. | "I Ain’t Got No Heart" | 2:02 |
| 10. | "Love Of My Life" | 1:56 |
| 11. | "You Are What You Is" | 3:22 |
| Total length: | | 55:58 |

Disc three - Munich, Germany Olympiahalle July 3rd, 1980 (cont'd)
| No. | Title | Length |
|---|---|---|
| 1. | "Easy Meat" | 11:02 |
| 2. | "Mudd Club" | 3:08 |
| 3. | "The Meek Shall Inherit Nothing" | 3:08 |
| 4. | "Joe’s Garage" | 2:19 |
| 5. | "Why Does It Hurt When I Pee?" | 3:16 |
| 6. | "Dancin’ Fool" | 3:32 |
| 7. | "Bobby Brown Goes Down" | 2:41 |
| 8. | "Ms. Pinky" | 3:49 |
| 9. | "Stick It Out" | 5:31 |
| 10. | "Nite Owl (T. Allen)" | 2:20 |
| 11. | "The Illinois Enema Bandit" | 10:21 |
| Total length: | | 51:07 |

=== Mudd Club 2LP ===
Side A
| No. | Title | Length |
|---|---|---|
| 1. | "Mudd Club Show Start" | 1:03 |
| 2. | "Chunga’s Revenge" | 4:03 |
| 3. | "Keep It Greasy" | 3:03 |
| 4. | "Outside Now" | 5:55 |
| Total length: | | 14:04 |

Side B
| No. | Title | Length |
|---|---|---|
| 1. | "City Of Tiny Lites" (Edited) | 6:39 |
| 2. | "Pound For A Brown" | 3:46 |
| 3. | "You Are What You Is" | 3:46 |
| Total length: | | 14:11 |

Side C
| No. | Title | Length |
|---|---|---|
| 1. | "You Didn’t Try To Call Me" | 3:46 |
| 2. | "I Ain’t Got No Heart" | 2:07 |
| 3. | "Love Of My Life" | 2:11 |
| 4. | "Easy Meat" | 7:25 |
| Total length: | | 15:29 |

Side D
| No. | Title | Length |
|---|---|---|
| 1. | "Mudd Club" | 3:35 |
| 2. | "The Meek Shall Inherit Nothing" | 3:15 |
| 3. | "Joe’s Garage" | 2:25 |
| 4. | "Why Does It Hurt When I Pee?" | 3:46 |
| Total length: | | 13:01 |

=== Munich 3LP ===
Side A
| No. | Title | Length |
|---|---|---|
| 1. | "Munich '80 Show Start" | 0:56 |
| 2. | "Chunga’s Revenge" | 7:14 |
| 3. | "Keep It Greasy" | 3:09 |
| 4. | "Pick Me, I’m Clean" | 6:45 |
| Total length: | | 18:04 |

Side B
| No. | Title | Length |
|---|---|---|
| 1. | "City Of Tiny Lites" | 9:11 |
| 2. | "Pound For A Brown" | 13:33 |
| Total length: | | 22:44 |

Side C
| No. | Title | Length |
|---|---|---|
| 1. | "Cosmik Debris" | 4:11 |
| 2. | "You Didn’t Try To Call Me" | 3:39 |
| 3. | "I Ain’t Got No Heart" | 2:02 |
| 4. | "Love Of My Life" | 1:56 |
| 5. | "You Are What You Is" | 3:22 |
| Total length: | | 15:10 |

Side D
| No. | Title | Length |
|---|---|---|
| 1. | "Easy Meat" | 11:02 |
| 2. | "Mudd Club" | 3:08 |
| 3. | "The Meek Shall Inherit Nothing" | 3:08 |
| 4. | "Joe’s Garage" | 2:19 |
| 5. | "Why Does It Hurt When I Pee?" | 3:16 |
| Total length: | | 22:53 |

Side E
| No. | Title | Length |
|---|---|---|
| 1. | "Dancin’ Fool" | 3:32 |
| 2. | "Bobby Brown Goes Down" | 2:41 |
| 3. | "Ms. Pinky" | 3:49 |
| 4. | "Stick It Out" | 5:31 |
| Total length: | | 15:33 |

Side F
| No. | Title | Length |
|---|---|---|
| 1. | "Nite Owl (T. Allen)" | 2:20 |
| 2. | "The Illinois Enema Bandit" | 10:21 |
| Total length: | | 12:41 |

== Personnel ==
- Frank Zappa - lead guitar, vocals
- Ike Willis - vocals, guitar
- Ray White - vocals, guitar
- Arthur Barrow - bass
- Tommy Mars - keyboards
- David Logeman - drums
