= The Frank Zappa AAAFNRAAA Birthday Bundle =

The Frank Zappa AAAFNRAAA Birthday Bundle 2008

Compilation album by Frank Zappa
- Released: December 21, 2008
- Genre: Rock
- Producer: Frank Zappa, Joe Travers, Dweezil Zappa, Linda Perry

Frank Zappa chronology
Joe's Menage (2008)	The Frank Zappa AAAFNRAAA Birthday Bundle 2008 (2008)	Congress Shall Make No Law... (2010)

The Frank Zappa AAAFNRAAA Birthday Bundle 2008 was released as a digital download on iTunes on December 21, 2008. It consists of five previously unreleased tracks performed by Frank Zappa, and new tracks featuring Zappa's children, producer Joe Travers and others. It is the second iTunes album by Frank Zappa, the first being The Frank Zappa AAAFNRAA Birthday Bundle (2006). (AAAFNRAA stands for "Anything Anytime Anywhere for No Reason At All", Zappa's motto of sorts.) The additional A in this release's title stands for "Again".

== Track listing ==
1. "Dancin' Fool" (Disco Version) - 6:18 (Frank Zappa)
  - Artist: Frank Zappa
  - Producer: Frank Zappa
  - Originally released April 1979 on a 12” single. Released in 1995 by Rykodisc on Strictly Commercial
2. "More Trouble Every Day" - 5:48 (Frank Zappa)
  - Artist: Frank Zappa
  - Producer: Frank Zappa
  - Recorded live in Wien, Austria, May 8, 1988
3. "Gorgeous Inca" - 3:25 (Frank Zappa)
  - Artist: Frank Zappa
  - Producer: Frank Zappa
  - Recorded live in Graz, Austria, March 23, 1979
4. "Ancient Armaments" - 4:09 (Frank Zappa)
  - Artist: Frank Zappa
  - Producer: Frank Zappa
  - Originally released as a B-side to the single "I Don’t Want To Get Drafted". Recorded live in New York City, October 31, 1978
5. "America the Beautiful" - 3:35 (Traditional)
  - Artist: Frank Zappa
  - Producer: Frank Zappa
  - Recorded live in Uniondale, New York, March 25, 1988
6. "You're a Mean One, Mr. Grinch" - 3:12 (Dr. Seuss & Albert Hague)
  - Artist: Dweezil Zappa with Ahmet Zappa (vocals)
  - Producer: Dweezil Zappa
  - Originally released in 2000 on the Dweezil Zappa CD Automatic
7. "Saturday Girl" - 2:50 (Dweezil Zappa)
  - Artist: Dweezil Zappa
  - Producer: Dweezil Zappa
8. "Alice" - 5:12
  - Artist: Diva Zappa
  - Producer: Dweezil Zappa
9. "Espanoza" - 3:26
  - Artist: Diva Zappa
  - Producer: Dweezil Zappa
10. "Dumb All Over" - 5:46 (Frank Zappa)
  - Artist: Melanie Starks
  - Producer: Joe Travers
11. "Twenty Small Cigars" - 5:49 (Frank Zappa)
  - Artist: Joe Travers
  - Producer: Joe Travers
12. "Lacksadaisial" - 5:44 (Joe Travers)
  - Artist: Joe Travers
  - Producer: Joe Travers
13. "Dirty Love" - 4:04 (Frank Zappa)
  - Artist: Cree Summer
  - Ahmet Zappa (background vocals) & Dweezil Zappa (guitar)
  - Producer: Linda Perry
