= Cheap Thrills (Frank Zappa album) =

1998 compilation album by Frank Zappa

Compilation album by Frank Zappa
- Released: April 28, 1998
- Genre: Experimental rock, progressive rock
- Label: Rykodisc
- Producer: FZ (original recordings); David Greenberg (compilation)

Frank Zappa chronology
Cucamonga (1998)	Cheap Thrills (1998)	Mystery Disc (1998)

Professional ratings
Review scores
Source	Rating
Allmusic	3/5 stars

Cheap Thrills is a compilation album by Frank Zappa, with material from previously released albums.

The album spent five weeks on the UK Top 100 Chart, peaking at 83.

== Track listing ==
All tracks by Frank Zappa, except where noted.

1. "I Could Be a Star Now" (from Playground Psychotics, 1992)
2. "Catholic Girls" (live version) (from You Can't Do That on Stage Anymore, Vol. 6, 1992)
3. "Bobby Brown Goes Down" (live version) (from You Can't Do That on Stage Anymore, Vol. 3, 1989)
4. "You Are What You Is" (from Thing-Fish, 1984)
5. "We Are Not Alone" (from The Man from Utopia, 1983)
6. "Cheap Thrills" (from Cruising with Ruben & the Jets, 1968)
7. "The Mudshark Interview" (from Playground Psychotics, 1992)
8. "Hot Plate Heaven at the Green Hotel" (from Broadway the Hard Way, 1988)
9. "Zomby Woof" (live version) (from You Can't Do That on Stage Anymore, Vol. 1, 1988)
10. "The Torture Never Stops (Original Version)" (from You Can't Do That on Stage Anymore, Vol. 4, 1991)
11. "Joe's Garage" (live version) (from You Can't Do That on Stage Anymore, Vol. 3, 1984)
12. "My Guitar Wants to Kill Your Mama" (live version) (from You Can't Do That on Stage Anymore, Vol. 4, 1984)
13. "Going for the Money" (from Playground Psychotics, 1992)

== Credits ==
- Original recordings produced by FZ
- Compilation produced by David Greenberg
- Mastered by Toby Mountain, Northeastern Digital Recording
- Art & design by Cal Schenkel
- News analysis by David Baker
