= The Frank Zappa AAAFNRAAAAAM Birthday Bundle 2011 =

Compilation album by Frank Zappa
- Released: December 21, 2011
- Genre: Rock
- Label: Zappa

Frank Zappa chronology
The Frank Zappa AAAFNRAAAA Birthday Bundle 2010 (2010)	The Frank Zappa AAAFNRAAAAAM Birthday Bundle 2011 (2011)

The Frank Zappa AAAFNRAAAAAM Birthday Bundle 2011 is a compilation album released as a digital download through the Zappa Family Trust on Frank Zappa's 71st birthday, December 21, 2011. It features both recordings by Zappa himself, as well as various covers of his material.

The first track, "Wowie Zowie", features a new vocal by Zappa's granddaughter Mathilda, over the original instrumental track for the song from the 1966 album Freak Out!. Coincidentally, December 21, 2011 is Mathilda's seventh birthday.

== Track list ==
1. "Wowie Zowie" (Mathilda Plum Doucette Zappa)
2. "Bobby Brown" (Se Upp För F-N)" (Lise & Gertrud)
3. "Yellow Snow" (Serj Tankian)
4. "Magic Fingers" (Rama Duke)
5. "Dirty Love" (The Dirty Diamond)
6. "Why Does It Hurt When I Pee?" (Pancho and Sancho)
7. "Dead Girls of London (vm)" (L. Shankar and Frank Zappa, with Van Morrison)
8. "Another Variation Of The Formerly Secret" (Frank Zappa)
9. "Peaches (Vienna 88)" (Frank Zappa)
10. "Cosmik Debris" (Frank Zappa, with Dweezil Zappa and Zappa Plays Zappa)
11. "Sleep Dirt" (Pete Griffin)
12. "Evelyn, A Modified Dog" (Jamie Kime)
13. "Love of My Life" (Jerry Lawson)
