= Chicago '78 =

Live album by Frank Zappa
- Released: November 4, 2016
- Recorded: September 29, 1978 (late show)
- Venue: Uptown Theatre, Chicago
- Genre: Rock
- Length: 119:47
- Label: Zappa Records
- Producer: Gail Zappa; Joe Travers

Frank Zappa chronology
Meat Light (2016)	Chicago '78 (2016)	Little Dots (2016)

Chicago '78 is a two-disc live album by guitarist, singer, and songwriter Frank Zappa, released in November 2016, consisting of the recording of the entire second concert performed on September 29, 1978 at the Uptown Theatre in Chicago, Illinois.

== Production ==
When creating the album, co-producer Joe Travers found that there were several gaps in the main concert recording, caused by the changing of tape reels. He was able to capture the entire show by splicing in recordings from two other sources.

== Critical reception ==
Professional ratings
Review scores
Source	Rating
AllMusic	3.5/5 stars

On AllMusic, Sean Westergaard said, "This album is the entire show and fans are going to love it.... Some of the songs are merely performed well, but there are enough surprises and great solos that fans will be pleased. This isn't the place to start your Zappa collection, but releases of full FZ shows are rare and hearing another full show with Vinnie Colaiuta on drums is a treat."

== Track listing ==
All tracks are written by Frank Zappa.

Disc one
No.	Title	Length
1.	"Chicago Walk-On"	1:20
2.	"Twenty-One"	8:26
3.	"Dancin' Fool"	3:29
4.	"Easy Meat"	5:41
5.	"Honey, Don't You Want a Man Like Me?"	4:21
6.	"Keep It Greasy"	3:41
7.	"Village of the Sun"	9:15
8.	"The Meek Shall Inherit Nothing"	3:29
9.	"Bamboozled By Love"	8:32
10.	"Sy Borg"	4:36
Total length:		52:49

Disc two
No.	Title	Length
1.	"Little House I Used to Live In"	9:38
2.	"Paroxysmal Splendor (includes: FZ & Pig/I'm a Beautiful Guy/Crew Slut)"	7:14
3.	"Yo Mama"	12:28
4.	"Magic Fingers"	2:37
5.	"Don't Eat the Yellow Snow"	18:36
6.	"Strictly Genteel"	8:25
7.	"Black Napkins"	8:01
Total length:		66:58

== Personnel ==
Musicians

- Frank Zappa – guitar, vocals
- Ike Willis – guitar, vocals
- Denny Walley – slide guitar, vocals
- Tommy Mars – keyboards, vocals
- Peter Wolf – keyboards
- Ed Mann – percussion, vocals
- Arthur Barrow – bass, vocals
- Vinnie Colaiuta – drums, vocals

Production

- Original recordings produced by Frank Zappa
- Produced for release by Gail Zappa and Joe Travers
- 1978 mix engineer: Davy Moire
- 1978 recordist: Claus Weideman
- 2014 re-mix engineer: Craig Parker Adams, Winslow CT Studio, Hollywood CA
- 2014 mastering engineer: Bob Ludwig, Gateway Mastering
