= Funky Nothingness =

Compilation album by Frank Zappa
- Released: June 30, 2023
- Recorded: February–March 1970
- Studio: Record Plant, Los Angeles, California, Frank Zappa's basement, Los Angeles, California
- Length: 210:54 (3CD); 74:58 (2LP)
- Label: Zappa Records
- Producer: Ahmet Zappa; Joe Travers

Frank Zappa chronology
| Zappa '80 Mudd Club/Munich (2023) | Funky Nothingness (2023) | Whisky a Go Go, 1968 (2024) |

Funky Nothingness is an album by Frank Zappa, released on June 30, 2023. It is a 3-CD set that primarily contains unreleased songs written and recorded in 1970, shortly after sessions concluded for the album Hot Rats.

== Background ==
While the first incarnation of the Mothers of Invention was in the process of disbanding, Frank Zappa embarked on a solo career and created the predominantly instrumental and jazz oriented Hot Rats, which would become one of his most acclaimed works. The album, rather than having a core group of musicians, utilized various session players from track to track. In February and March 1970, Zappa re-assembled a core group from these sessions to record new material. The group consisted of Ian Underwood, Max Bennett and Don "Sugarcane" Harris, as well as newcomer Aynsley Dunbar, who had recently relocated to Los Angeles and moved in with Zappa.

Many of the tracks on Funky Nothingness were recorded by the five-piece group at the newly opened Record Plant studio, some of which initially appeared in edited form on other Zappa albums. A hybrid edit of "Chunga's Revenge" and much shorter edits of "Transylvania Boogie" and "The Clap" would appear on Chunga's Revenge (1970). A longer version of "Chunga's Revenge (Basement Version)" was released on the DVD-Audio album Quaudiophiliac (2004), under the title "Chunga's Basement". "Sharleena (1970 Record Plant Mix)" appeared on the posthumous compilation The Lost Episodes (1996) in newly remixed form. The title track originates from 1967, at the end of a recording session for Uncle Meat. It features the original Mothers' bassist, and James "Motorhead" Sherwood on rhythm guitar.

== Track listing ==
All tracks are written by Frank Zappa, except where noted.

CD1: Funky Nothingness – The Album
| No. | Title | Writer(s) | Length |
|---|---|---|---|
| 1. | "Funky Nothingness" | | 1:49 |
| 2. | "Tommy/Vincent Duo I" | | 0:45 |
| 3. | "Love Will Make Your Mind Go Wild" | Curtis Williams | 2:46 |
| 4. | "I'm a Rollin' Stone" | Jerry West, Otis Hicks | 12:20 |
| 5. | "Chunga's Revenge" (Basement Version) | | 9:22 |
| 6. | "Basement Jam" | | 6:27 |
| 7. | "Work with Me Annie / Annie Had a Baby" | Henry Ballard, Jerry West / Henry Glover, Sydney Nathan | 2:48 |
| 8. | "Tommy/Vincent Duo II" | | 6:42 |
| 9. | "Sharleena" (1970 Record Plant Mix) | | 12:15 |
| 10. | "Khaki Sack" | | 8:09 |
| 11. | "Twinkle Tits" | | 11:35 |
| Total length: | | | 74:58 |

CD 2: Zappa/Hot Rats '70: Session Masters and Bonus Nothingness
| No. | Title | Writer(s) | Length |
|---|---|---|---|
| 1. | "Chunga's Revenge" (Take 5) | | 16:16 |
| 2. | "Love Will Make Your Mind Go Wild" (Take 4) | Curtis Williams | 3:16 |
| 3. | "Transylvania Boogie" (Unedited Master) | | 18:13 |
| 4. | "Sharleena" (Unedited Master) | | 14:56 |
| 5. | "Work with Me Annie/Annie Had a Baby" (Alternate edit) | Henry Ballard, Jerry West / Henry Glover, Sydney Nathan | 4:29 |
| 6. | "Twinkle Tits" (Take 1, False Start) | | 0:48 |
| 7. | "Twinkle Tits" (Take 2) | | 13:00 |
| Total length: | | | 70:58 |

CD 3: Zappa/Hot Rats '70: More Session Masters and Bonus Nothingness
| No. | Title | Length |
|---|---|---|
| 1. | "The Clap" (Unedited Master – Part I) | 11:28 |
| 2. | "The Clap" (Unedited Master – Part II) | 4:38 |
| 3. | "Tommy/Vincent Duo" (Unedited Master) | 21:53 |
| 4. | "Chunga's Revenge" (Take 8) | 19:48 |
| 5. | "Halos and Arrows" | 3:03 |
| 6. | "Moldred" | 3:22 |
| 7. | "Fast Funky Nothingness" | 0:46 |
| Total length: | | 64:58 |

=== 2LP vinyl ===
Side A
| No. | Title | Writer(s) | Length |
|---|---|---|---|
| 1. | "Funky Nothingness" | | 1:49 |
| 2. | "Tommy/Vincent Duo I" | | 0:45 |
| 3. | "Love Will Make Your Mind Go Wild" | Curtis Williams | 2:46 |
| 4. | "I'm a Rollin' Stone" | Jerry West, Otis Hicks | 12:20 |
| Total length: | | | 17:40 |

Side B
| No. | Title | Length |
|---|---|---|
| 1. | "Chunga's Revenge" (Basement Version) | 9:22 |
| 2. | "Basement Jam" | 6:27 |
| Total length: | | 15:49 |

Side C
| No. | Title | Writer(s) | Length |
|---|---|---|---|
| 1. | "Work with Me Annie / Annie Had a Baby" | Henry Ballard, Jerry West / Henry Glover, Sydney Nathan | 2:48 |
| 2. | "Tommy/Vincent Duo II" | | 6:42 |
| 3. | "Sharleena" (1970 Record Plant Mix) | | 12:15 |
| Total length: | | | 21:45 |

Side D
| No. | Title | Length |
|---|---|---|
| 1. | "Khaki Sack" | 8:09 |
| 2. | "Twinkle Tits" | 11:35 |
| Total length: | | 19:44 |

== Personnel ==
- Frank Zappa – guitar, vocals, percussion (all tracks)
- Aynsley Dunbar – drums (1–2 to 2–7, 3–3, 3–4)
- Max Bennett – electric bass, acoustic bass (1–3 to 1–7, 1–9 to 2–7, 3–4)
- Ian Underwood – keyboards, saxophone, rhythm guitar (1–3 to 1–7, 1–9 to 2–7, 3–4)
- Don "Sugarcane" Harris – violin, organ, vocals (1–3 to 1–7, 1–9 to 2–7, 3–4)
- James "Motorhead" Sherwood – rhythm guitar (1–1, 3-7)
- Roy Estrada – bass (1–1, 3-7)

== Charts ==
Chart performance for Funky Nothingness
| Chart (2023) | Peak position |
|---|---|
| Belgian Albums (Ultratop Flanders) | 36 |
| Belgian Albums (Ultratop Wallonia) | 174 |
| Dutch Albums (Album Top 100) | 35 |
| French Albums (SNEP) | 171 |
| German Albums (Offizielle Top 100) | 15 |
| Swiss Albums (Schweizer Hitparade) | 21 |
| Scottish Albums (OCC) | 29 |
| UK Rock & Metal Albums (OCC) | 4 |
