= I Have Been in You =

Song by Frank Zappa

from the album Sheik Yerbouti
- Released: March 3, 1979
- Recorded: Hammersmith Odeon, London; January 25, 1978
- Genre: Comedy rock
- Length: 3:33
- Label: Zappa Records, CBS Records International
- Songwriter(s): Frank Zappa
- Producer(s): Frank Zappa

"I Have Been in You", by Frank Zappa, is the opening song on the 1979 album Sheik Yerbouti. Taking the structure of a love song pastiche, Zappa used the composition to ridicule Peter Frampton's 1977 album and single I'm in You. Zappa's parody was directed at Frampton's change from the earnest musician to teen pop idol, replete with bare chested album cover, and syrupy love ballads. The song is in the same vein as the Mothers of Invention's lampooning of the Beatles with We're Only in It for the Money.

Lyrically, it describes a sex scene between a boy and girl, "I have been in you, baby/And you have been in me". Recorded live at the Hammersmith Odeon in London, Zappa later re-recorded the vocals at his personal studio, the Utility Muffin Research Kitchen facility, using a close micing technique. Musically, the bass singer and the bass guitar are giving a counter melody. When Zappa begins singing the song develops into a slow reggae beat. At various points Zappa sings slightly off beat, letting the speech lengths of the syllables prevail, which emphasises the lyrics. In concert, "I Have Been in You" was usually performed as part of a long medley, featuring "Flakes" and "Broken Hearts Are for Assholes".

Zappa explained the song's origin in the track "Is This Guy Kidding or What?" which was recorded in 1977, and released on the 1992 live album, You Can't Do That on Stage Anymore, Vol. 6.

== Personnel ==
- Frank Zappa – lead guitar, lead and backing vocals, arranger, composer, producer, remixing
- Davey Moire – backing vocals, engineer
- Napoleon Murphy Brock – backing vocals
- Andre Lewis – backing vocals
- Randy Thornton – backing vocals
- Adrian Belew – rhythm guitar, backing vocals
- Tommy Mars – keyboards, backing vocals
- Peter Wolf – keyboards
- Patrick O'Hearn – bass, backing vocals
- Terry Bozzio – drums, backing vocals
- Ed Mann – percussion, backing vocals
