= Strictly Commercial =

Greatest hits album by Frank Zappa
- Released: August 2, 1995
- Recorded: 1966–1988
- Genres: Hard rock, progressive rock, art rock, comedy rock, experimental rock, jazz fusion
- Length: 76:45 (US CD), 77:01 (Europe CD)
- Label: Rykodisc
- Producer: Tom Wilson

Frank Zappa chronology
The Guitar World According to Frank Zappa (1987)	Strictly Commercial (1995)	Strictly Genteel (1997)

Professional ratings
Review scores
Source	Rating
AllMusic	4.5/5 stars
Entertainment Weekly	A

Strictly Commercial is a compilation album by Frank Zappa. It was released in 1995, two years after his death. The album was named as part of a 2011 lawsuit by Gail Zappa towards Rykodisc, claiming the label released several vault masters without the permission of the Zappa Family Trust on this and other releases, specifically the single edits of some songs, such as the 12" disco Remix of "Dancin' Fool". The disc is currently out of print and has been replaced in Zappa's catalog by the 2016 compilation album ZAPPAtite.

== Track listing ==
All songs written and performed by Frank Zappa, except where noted.

The title of the album is taken from a lyric in "Don't Eat The Yellow Snow Suite" and maintains Zappa's conceptual continuity.

=== Strictly Commercial ===
==== Vinyl release ====
Side one

1. "Peaches en Regalia" - 3:37
2. "Don't Eat the Yellow Snow" (Single version) - 3:34
3. "Dancin' Fool" (12" disco mix) - 6:15
  - The American and European CD issues had the album mix instead of the 12" disco mix.
4. "San Ber'dino" - 5:57
5. "Let's Make the Water Turn Black" - 1:45

Side two

1. "Dirty Love" - 2:57
2. "My Guitar Wants to Kill Your Mama" - 3:31
3. "Cosmik Debris" - 4:14
4. "Trouble Every Day" - 5:49
5. "Disco Boy" - 5:08

Side three

1. "Bobby Brown (Goes Down)" - 2:49
2. "I'm the Slime" - 3:34
3. "Joe's Garage" (Single version) - 4:08
4. "Fine Girl" - 3:29
5. "Planet of the Baritone Women"
6. "Sexual Harassment in the Workplace"

Side four

1. "Tell Me You Love Me"
2. "Montana" (Single version)
3. "Valley Girl" (F. Zappa, Moon Unit Zappa)
4. "Be in My Video"
5. "Muffin Man"

==== American CD release ====
1. "Peaches en Regalia" – 3:37
2. "Don't Eat the Yellow Snow" (Single version) – 3:34
3. "Dancin' Fool" – 3:43
4. "San Ber'dino" – 5:57
5. "Dirty Love" – 2:57
6. "My Guitar Wants to Kill Your Mama" – 3:31
7. "Cosmik Debris" – 4:14
8. "Trouble Every Day" – 5:49
9. "Disco Boy" – 5:08
10. "Fine Girl" – 3:29
11. "Sexual Harassment in the Workplace" – 3:42
12. "Let's Make the Water Turn Black" – 2:01
13. "I'm the Slime" – 3:34
14. "Joe's Garage" (Single version) – 4:08
15. "Tell Me You Love Me" – 2:33
16. "Montana" (Single version) – 4:47
17. "Valley Girl" (F. Zappa, M. Zappa) – 4:50
18. "Be In My Video" – 3:39
19. "Muffin Man" – 5:32

On the European CD, "Tell Me You Love Me" was replaced by "Bobby Brown Goes Down," which was Zappa's biggest hit in Europe, but extremely controversial in the United States, and never aired on the radio. A version released in Australia and New Zealand was identical to the U.S. CD, but included the track "Elvis Has Just Left the Building" on a separate disc.

==== Japanese CD release ====
1. "Peaches en Regalia"
2. "Don't Eat the Yellow Snow" (Single version)
3. "San Ber'dino"
4. "Dirty Love"
5. "My Guitar Wants to Kill Your Mama"
6. "Who Are the Brain Police?"
  - The American and European CD issues had "Cosmik Debris" instead of this track.
7. "Trouble Every Day"
8. "Disco Boy"
9. "Fine Girl"
10. "Sexual Harassment in the Workplace"
11. "Let's Make the Water Turn Black"
12. "I'm the Slime"
13. "Joe's Garage" (Single version)
14. "Tell Me You Love Me"
15. "Montana" (Single version)
16. "Valley Girl" (F. Zappa, M. Zappa)
17. "Be in My Video"
18. "Muffin Man"
19. "Dancin' Fool" (12" disco mix)
  - The American and European CD issues had the album mix instead of the 12" disco mix.

==== Japanese CD paper sleeve re-release ====
===== Disc 1 =====
1. "Peaches en Regalia"
2. "Don't Eat the Yellow Snow" (Single version)
3. "Dancin' Fool" (12" disco mix)
4. "San Ber'dino"
5. "Let's Make the Water Turn Black"
6. "Dirty Love"
7. "My Guitar Wants to Kill Your Mama"
8. "Cosmik Debris"
9. "Trouble Every Day"
10. "Disco Boy"

===== Disc 2 =====
1. "Bobby Brown Goes Down"
2. "I'm the Slime"
3. "Joe's Garage" (Single version)
4. "Fine Girl"
5. "Planet of the Baritone Women"
6. "Sexual Harassment in the Workplace"
7. "Tell Me You Love Me"
8. "Montana" (Single version)
9. "Valley Girl" (F. Zappa, M. Zappa)
10. "Be in My Video"
11. "Muffin Man"

=== The Best of Frank Zappa ===
1. "Peaches en Regalia" – 3:37
2. "Don't Eat the Yellow Snow" (Single version) – 3:34
3. "Dancin' Fool" – 3:43
4. "San Ber'dino" – 5:57
5. "Dirty Love" – 2:57
6. "My Guitar Wants to Kill Your Mama" – 3:31
7. "Cosmik Debris" – 4:14
8. "Disco Boy" – 5:08
9. "Fine Girl" – 3:29
10. "I'm the Slime" – 3:34
11. "Joe's Garage" (Single version) – 4:08
12. "Bobby Brown Goes Down" – 2:49
13. "Montana" (Single version) – 4:48
14. "Valley Girl" (Frank Zappa, Moon Zappa) – 4:50
15. "Muffin Man" – 5:33

== Personnel ==
- Frank Zappa – composer, producer, vocals, main performer, guitar
- Tom Wilson – producer
- Warren Cuccurullo – rhythm guitar
- Dan Ouellette – liner notes
- Tom Fowler – bass
- Bruce Fowler – trombone
- Captain Beefheart – vocals, soprano sax
- Terry Gilliam – liner notes
- Cal Schenkel – photography
- Ebet Roberts – photography
- Michael Hochanadel – photography
- Baron Wolman – photography
- Jean-Pierre Leloir – photography
- Joseph Sia – photography
- Ann Rhoney – photography
- Norman Seeff – photography
- Dr. Toby Mountain – mastering
- Joe Chiccarelli – mixing, recording
- Steven Jurgensmeyer – package design

== Charts ==
Chart performance for Strictly Commercial
Chart (1995)	Peak position
Australian Albums (ARIA)	63
Belgian Albums (Ultratop Flanders)	33
Canada Top Albums/CDs (RPM)	52
German Albums (Offizielle Top 100)	51
Norwegian Albums (VG-lista)	7
Swedish Albums (Sverigetopplistan)	2
Swiss Albums (Schweizer Hitparade)	12
UK Albums (Official Charts)	45
