= The Mothers 1970 =

Box set by Frank Zappa
- Released: June 26, 2020
- Recorded: 1970
- Studio: Trident Studios, London (Disc 1)
- Genre: Comedy rock; jazz-rock; jam band; blues rock; spoken word
- Length: 269:20
- Label: Zappa Records
- Producer: Ahmet Zappa; Joe Travers

Frank Zappa chronology
The Hot Rats Sessions (2019)	The Mothers 1970 (2020)	Halloween 81 (2020)

Professional ratings
Review scores
Source	Rating
Loudersound	3.5/5 stars

The Mothers 1970 is a 4-CD box set celebrating the 50th anniversary of the short-lived 1970 line-up of The Mothers. It compiles 70 unreleased tracks recorded during this era of the band.

== Content ==
The album contains three discs of previously unreleased material, The first disc features studio recordings from Trident Studios that would eventually evolve into Chunga's Revenge. These studio recordings were engineered by a then-unknown Roy Thomas Baker who would go on to be the producer for many bands such as Queen, The Cars, and Alice Cooper. The remaining three discs contain live concerts from this era, The first two discs contain the first official release of the bootlegged "Piknik" live broadcast as well as live concerts in Santa Monica, California, and Spokane, Washington. Due to not being entirely recorded, these concerts were put together in a hybrid concert. The third disc consists of live highlights that were recorded throughout the US occasionally broken up with candid moments recorded in dressing rooms, motel lobbies, and on stage. These were recorded by Frank Zappa who took his UHER recorder everywhere. All of these recordings were sourced from their original vault tapes and digitally compiled and transferred by Joe Travers in 2020.

== Reception ==
Writing for Loudersound, Hugh Fielder liked the album. He states that the first disc is "somewhat tentative" and states how the live discs show that this band line-up is far better than the album Chunga's Revenge's performances. He also states that the live concerts show the band moving towards what would eventually become 200 Motels.

== Track listing ==
Disc one – Trident Studios, London, England June 21–22, 1970
No.	Title	Length
1.	"Red Tubular Lighter"	4:51
2.	"Lola Steponsky"	3:29
3.	"Trident Chatter"	1:45
4.	"Sharleena" (Roy Thomas Baker Mix)	4:04
5.	"Item 1"	5:47
6.	"Wonderful Wino" (FZ Vocal)	5:12
7.	"“Enormous Cadenza”"	1:11
8.	"Envelopes"	8:23
9.	"Red Tubular Lighter" (Unedited Master)	9:25
10.	"Wonderful Wino" (Basic Tracks, Alt. Take)	4:56
11.	"Giraffe - Take 4"	8:12
12.	"Wonderful Wino" (FZ Vocal, Alt. Solo)	5:55
Total length:		63:09

Disc two – Live Highlights Part 1 – “Piknik” VPRO June 18, 1970 / Pepperland September 26, 1970
No.	Title	Length
1.	"Introducing...The Mothers"	3:52
2.	"Wonderful Wino"	4:54
3.	"Concentration Moon"	2:30
4.	"Mom & Dad"	3:13
5.	"The Air"	3:18
6.	"Dog Breath"	2:09
7.	"Mother People"	2:10
8.	"You Didn't Try To Call Me"	4:21
9.	"Agon (Stravinsky)"	0:37
10.	"Call Any Vegetable"	7:14
11.	"King Kong Pt. I"	4:31
12.	"Igor's Boogie"	1:09
13.	"King Kong Pt. II"	7:09
14.	"What Kind Of Girl Do You Think We Are?"	4:26
15.	"Bwana Dik"	2:48
16.	"Daddy, Daddy, Daddy"	2:47
17.	"Do You Like My New Car?"	4:28
18.	"Happy Together"	2:00
Total length:		63:34

Disc three – Live Highlights Part 2 – Hybrid Concert: Santa Monica August 21, 1970 / Spokane September 17, 1970
No.	Title	Length
1.	""Welcome To El Monte Legion Stadium""	2:18
2.	"Agon (Stravinsky)"	0:48
3.	"Call Any Vegetable" (Edited)	8:28
4.	"Pound For A Brown"	4:37
5.	"Sleeping In A Jar"	2:45
6.	"Sharleena"	4:07
7.	"The Air"	3:56
8.	"Dog Breath"	2:00
9.	"Mother People"	2:05
10.	"You Didn't Try To Call Me"	4:32
11.	"King Kong Pt. I"	4:03
12.	"Igor's Boogie"	1:11
13.	"King Kong Pt. II"	8:28
14.	""Eat Yourself...""	0:47
15.	"Trouble Every Day"	4:05
16.	""A Series Of Musical Episodes""	2:09
17.	"Road Ladies"	3:57
18.	""The Holiday Inn Motel Chain""	2:06
19.	"What Will This Morning Bring Me This Evening?"	2:39
20.	"What Kind Of Girl Do You Think We Are?"	3:27
Total length:		68:29

Disc four – Live Highlights Part 3 - FZ Tour Tape Recording
No.	Title	Length
1.	""What's The Deal, Dick?""	1:25
2.	"Another M.O.I. Anti-Smut Loyalty Oath"	2:26
3.	"Paladin Routine #1"	1:24
4.	"Portuguese Fenders"	2:48
5.	"The Sanzini Brothers"	1:26
6.	"Guitar Build '70"	5:17
7.	"Would You Go All The Way?"	3:43
8.	"Easy Meat"	5:44
9.	""Who Did It?""	1:16
10.	"Turn It Down!"	4:13
11.	"A Chance Encounter In Cincinnati"	0:48
12.	"Pound For A Brown"	5:58
13.	"Sleeping In A Jar"	2:49
14.	"Beloit Sword Trick"	1:01
15.	"Kong Solos Pt. I"	15:23
16.	"Igor's Boogie"	1:13
17.	"Kong Solos Pt. II"	5:24
18.	"Gris Gris"	8:39
19.	"Paladin Routine #2"	1:38
20.	"King Kong - Outro"	1:32
Total length:		74:08

== Personnel ==
- Jeff Simmons - bass, vocals
- Frank Zappa - guitar, vocals, composer
- Aynsley Dunbar - drums
- Ian Underwood - organ, keyboards, guitar
- George Duke - piano, keyboards, trombone
- Flo & Eddie - vocals, percussion
