= Strictly Genteel =

Compilation album by Frank Zappa
- Released: May 20, 1997
- Recorded: 1964–1992
- Genre: 20th-century classical
- Length: 66:47
- Label: Rykodisc
- Producer: Frank Zappa

Frank Zappa chronology
Have I Offended Someone? (1997)	Strictly Genteel (1997)	Cucamonga (1998)

Professional ratings
Review scores
Source	Rating
AllMusic	4/5 stars

Strictly Genteel is a compilation album by Frank Zappa. It focuses on Zappa's "classical" and "serious" compositions, and as such is something of a companion to the previous Rykodisc-produced compilation, Strictly Commercial, which focused on "rock" songs with vocals. It was released in 1997.

== Track listing ==
No.	Title	Original album	Length
1.	"Uncle Meat: Main Title Theme"	Uncle Meat	01:55
2.	"Regyptian Strut"	Sleep Dirt	04:13
3.	"Pedro's Dowry"	Orchestral Favorites	07:41
4.	"Outrage at Valdez"	The Yellow Shark	03:09
5.	"Little Umbrellas"	Hot Rats	03:03
6.	"Run Home Slow Theme"	The Lost Episodes	01:25
7.	"Dwarf Nebula Processional March & Dwarf Nebula"	Weasels Ripped My Flesh	02:12
8.	"Dupree's Paradise"	The Perfect Stranger	07:53
9.	"Opus 1 - #3: 2nd movement - Presto"	Francesco Zappa	01:50
10.	"The Duke of Prunes"	Orchestral Favorites	04:20
11.	"Aybe Sea"	Burnt Weeny Sandwich	02:47
12.	"Naval Aviation in Art?"	The Perfect Stranger	02:42
13.	"G-Spot Tornado"	Jazz From Hell	03:17
14.	"Bob In Dacron"	London Symphony Orchestra Vol. II	05:36
15.	"Opus 1 - #4: 2nd movement - Allegro"	Francesco Zappa	03:01
16.	"Dog Breath Variations"	The Yellow Shark	02:06
17.	"Uncle Meat"	The Yellow Shark	02:51
18.	"Strictly Genteel"	London Symphony Orchestra Vol. II	06:57

== Credits ==
=== Production ===
- Jill Christiansen - Compilation producer
- Toby Mountain - Mastering
- Don Menn - Liner notes
- Guido Harari - Cover photograph
- Ferenc Dobronyi - Package design
