= Waka/Wazoo =

Box set by Frank Zappa
- Released: December 16, 2022
- Recorded: April–December, 1972
- Studios: Paramount Studios, Los Angeles, California
- Genres: Progressive rock; jazz fusion; experimental rock
- Length: 330:14
- Label: Zappa Records
- Producers: Ahmet Zappa, Joe Travers, Jeff Fura

Frank Zappa chronology
Zappa '75: Zagreb/Ljubljana (2022)	Waka/Wazoo (2022)	Zappa '80: Mudd Club/Munich (2023)

Waka/Wazoo is a boxset by Frank Zappa, released posthumously on December 16, 2022. It is a 4CD/1-Blu-ray set composed of various material recorded in 1972, during a period when Zappa was forced away from live performances due to injuries sustained during a concert on December 10, 1971. This includes recordings from the same Paramount Studios sessions which birthed the albums Waka/Jawaka (7/1972) and The Grand Wazoo (11/1972), and live material from the following tours of the same year.

== Content ==
The first two discs consist of alternate takes, alternate mixes, and outtakes of songs from Waka/Jawaka and The Grand Wazoo. The third disc consists of demo material of jazz keyboardist and band member at the time George Duke (including an early, instrumental version of the song "Uncle Remus" which would eventually be released with lyrics on Zappa's Apostrophe (')), an unreleased September 24 recording of the piece "Approximate" at the Boston Music Hall from the Grand Wazoo tour (the same show featured on the album Wazoo (2007), performed by the 19-piece incarnation of the band), and the first two tracks of a nearly complete show recorded during the Petit Wazoo tour (with the 10-piece band). The fourth disc consists of the remainder of this show. Also included in the set is a Blu-ray Audio disc containing various higher quality mixes of Waka/Jawaka and The Grand Wazoo.

== Track listing ==
CD1: Paramount Studios Recording Session Alternates and Outtakes
No.	Title	Length
1.	"Your Mouth" (Take 1)	5:28
2.	"Big Swifty" (Alternate Take)	15:11
3.	"Minimal Art" (Eat That Question – Version 1, Take 2)	10:28
4.	"Blessed Relief" (Outtake Version)	10:19
5.	"Think It Over (The Grand Wazoo)" (Outtake Version)	11:23
6.	"For Calvin (And His Next Two Hitch-Hikers)" (Outtake Version)	8:10
7.	"Waka/Jawaka" (Outtake Version)	13:41
Total length:		74:40

CD2: Paramount Studios Recording Session Alternates and Outtakes (cont'd)
No.	Title	Length
1.	"Cletus Awreetus-Awrightus" (Alternate Take)	2:51
2.	"Eat That Question" (Version 2, Alternate Take)	11:08
3.	"Big Swifty" (Alternate Mix)	14:52
4.	"For Calvin (And His Next Two Hitch-Hikers)" (Alternate Mix)	6:29
5.	"It Just Might Be a One-Shot Deal" (Alternate Mix)	4:18
6.	"Waka/Jawaka" (Alternate Mix)	15:53
7.	"Cletus Awreetus-Awrightus" (Alternate Mix)	2:57
8.	"Eat That Question" (Alternate Mix)	5:43
Total length:		64:11

CD3: George Duke Demos – The Master Versions
No.	Title	Length
1.	"For Love (I Come Your Friend)"	4:56
2.	"Psychosomatic Dung"	5:12
3.	"Uncle Remus" (Instrumental)	3:57
4.	"Love"	3:32

George Duke Session Outtakes
No.	Title	Length
5.	"For Love (I Come Your Friend)" (Basic Track, Take 1)	5:02
6.	"Psychosomatic Dung" (Basic Track, Take 2)	2:51
7.	"Love" (Basic Track, Take 1)	7:13

The Grand Wazoo - Live / Boston Music Hall, Boston, MA - 09-24-1972
No.	Title	Length
8.	"Approximate" (Live – FZ Record Plant Mix)	11:06

10-Piece/Petite Wazoo – Live / Winterland Ballroom, San Francisco, CA – 12-15-1972
No.	Title	Length
9.	"Winterland ’72 Opening and Band Introductions"	4:47
10.	"Little Dots"	18:09
Total length:		63:13

CD4: 10-Piece/Petite Wazoo – Live / Winterland Ballroom, San Francisco, CA – 12-15-1972 (cont'd)
No.	Title	Length
1.	"America Drinks"	6:48
2.	"Montana"	6:57
3.	"Farther O’Blivion"	15:02
4.	"Cosmik Debris"	8:11
5.	"Chunga’s Revenge"	18:04
Total length:		55:02

=== Blu Ray Audio ===
Waka/Jawaka Blu Ray Audio 48kHz 24-bit Dolby Atmos, 48kHz 24-bit Dolby TrueHD 5.1, 96kHz 24-bit PCM Stereo
No.	Title	Length
1.	"Big Swifty"	17:25
2.	"Your Mouth"	3:12
3.	"It Just Might Be a One-Shot Deal"	4:16
4.	"Waka / Jawaka"	11:16

The Grand Wazoo Blu Ray Audio 48kHz 24-bit Dolby Atmos, 48kHz 24-bit Dolby TrueHD 5.1, 96kHz 24-bit PCM Stereo
No.	Title	Length
1.	"The Grand Wazoo"	13:19
2.	"For Calvin (And His Next Two Hitch-Hikers)"	6:05
3.	"Cletus Awreetus-Awrightus"	2:56
4.	"Eat That Question"	6:40
5.	"Blessed Relief"	7:59
Total length:		73:08

== Personnel ==
=== Paramount Studios Recording Sessions ===
- Frank Zappa – guitar (all tracks), conductor (all tracks), vocals ("Cletus Awreetus-Awrightus", "It Just Might Be a One-Shot Deal"), acoustic guitar ("It Just Might Be a One-Shot Deal"), percussion ("Big Swifty", "Eat That Question"), electric bed springs ("It Just Might Be a One-Shot Deal")
- Aynsley Dunbar – drums (all tracks), washboard and tambourine ("It Just Might Be a One-Shot Deal")
- Alex Dmochowski ("Erroneous") – bass (all tracks), vocals ("It Just Might Be a One-Shot Deal"), fuzz bass ("Waka/Jawaka")
- Sal Marquez – trumpet ("Your Mouth", "Big Swifty", "Think It Over (The Grand Wazoo)", "For Calvin (And His Next Two Hitch-Hikers)", "Waka/Jawaka", "It Just Might Be a One-Shot Deal"), brass ("Eat That Question", "Blessed Relief", "Cleetus Awreetus-Awrightus"), vocals ("Your Mouth", "For Calvin (And His Next Two Hitch-Hikers)", "It Just Might Be a One-Shot Deal")
- Tony Duran – slide guitar ("Your Mouth", "Big Swifty", "Think It Over (The Grand Wazoo)", "For Calvin (And His Next Two Hitch-Hikers)", "It Just Might Be a One-Shot Deal"), vocals ("It Just Might Be a One-Shot Deal"), rhythm guitar ("Blessed Relief")
- George Duke – keyboards ("Eat That Question", "Blessed Relief", "Cleetus Awreetus-Awrightus"), ring modulated and echoplexed electric piano ("Big Swifty"), tack piano ("Your Mouth")
- Mike Altschul – woodwinds ("Eat That Question", "Blessed Relief", "Think It Over (The Grand Wazoo)", "For Calvin (And His Next Two Hitch-Hikers)", "Cleetus Awreetus-Awrightus"), baritone saxophone and piccolo ("Your Mouth", "Waka/Jawaka"), bass flute, bass clarinet and tenor sax ("Waka/Jawaka")
- Kenny Shroyer – brass ("Think It Over (The Grand Wazoo)", "For Calvin (And His Next Two Hitch-Hikers)"), trombone ("Waka/Jawaka", "Cletus Awreetus-Awrightus"), baritone horn ("Waka/Jawaka")
- Billy Byers – trombone ("Think It Over (The Grand Wazoo)", "For Calvin (And His Next Two Hitch-Hikers)", "Waka/Jawaka"), baritone horn ("Waka/Jawaka")
- Don Preston – minimoog ("Think It Over (The Grand Wazoo)", "Waka/Jawaka"), piano ("Waka/Jawaka")
- Malcolm McNab – brass ("Think It Over (The Grand Wazoo)", "For Calvin (And His Next Two Hitch-Hikers)")
- Ernie Tack – brass ("Think It Over (The Grand Wazoo)", "For Calvin (And His Next Two Hitch-Hikers)")
- Tony "Batman" Ortega – woodwinds ("Think It Over (The Grand Wazoo)", "For Calvin (And His Next Two Hitch-Hikers)")
- Earl Dumler – woodwinds ("Think It Over (The Grand Wazoo)", "For Calvin (And His Next Two Hitch-Hikers)")
- Fred Jackson – woodwinds ("Think It Over (The Grand Wazoo)", "For Calvin (And His Next Two Hitch-Hikers)")
- Joann Caldwell McNab – woodwinds ("Think It Over (The Grand Wazoo)", "For Calvin (And His Next Two Hitch-Hikers)")
- Joel Peskin – woodwinds ("Eat That Question", "Blessed Relief")
- Alan Estes – percussion ("Think It Over (The Grand Wazoo)", "For Calvin (And His Next Two Hitch-Hikers)")
- Bob Zimmitti – percussion ("Think It Over (The Grand Wazoo)", "For Calvin (And His Next Two Hitch-Hikers)")
- Lee Clement – percussion ("Eat That Question")
- Kris Peterson – vocals ("Your Mouth", "Waka/Jawaka")
- Janet Furgeson – vocals ("It Just Might Be a One Shot-Deal")
- Jeff Simmons – hawaiian guitar ("It Just Might Be a One-Shot Deal")
- Sneaky Pete Kleinow – pedal steel guitar ("It Just Might Be a One Shot-Deal")
- Lauren Wood ("Chunky") – vocals ("Cleetus Awreetus-Awrightus")

=== George Duke Demos ===
- George Duke – keyboards, vocals
- Aynsley Dunbar – drums
- Alex Dmochowski ("Erroneous") – bass
- Frank Zappa – guitar
- Sal Marquez – trumpet
- Lauren Wood ("Chunky") – vocals
- Tony "Batman" Ortega – woodwinds (most likely)
- Earl Dumler – woodwinds (most likely)
- Joel Peskin – woodwinds (most likely)
- Mike Altschul – woodwinds (most likely)
- Bob Zimmitti – percussion (possibly)
- Emil Richards – percussion (possibly)

=== The Grand Wazoo – Live ===
- Frank Zappa – conductor, guitar
- Sal Marquez – trumpet in B^{b}
- Bruce Fowler – trombone
- Tony Duran – slide guitar
- Dave Parlato – bass
- Jim Gordon – drums
- Ian Underwood – electric piano and synthesizer
- Ruth Underwood – marimba and percussion
- Tom Raney – vibes and percussion
- Glen Ferris – trombone and euphonium
- Kenny Shroyer – trombone and baritone horn
- Tom Malone – trumpet in B^{b}, tuba
- Malcolm McNab – trumpet in D
- Jerry Kessler – cello
- Jay Migliori – flute, tenor sax and other winds
- Mike Altshul – piccolo flute, bass clarinet and other winds
- Ray Reed – clarinet, tenor sax and other winds
- Charles Owens – soprano sax, alto sax and other winds
- Joann McNab – bassoon
- Earl Dumler – oboe, contrabass sarrusophone and other winds

=== 10-Piece/Petite Wazoo – Live ===
- Frank Zappa – conductor, guitar, vocals
- Bruce Fowler – trombone
- Tony Duran – slide guitar
- Jim Gordon – drums
- Dave Parlato – bass
- Gary Barone – trumpet
- Glen Ferris – trombone
- Kenny Shroyer – trombone
- Malcolm McNab – trumpet
- Tom Malone – tuba, piccolo trumpet, trumpet
- Earl Dumler – woodwinds

=== Production Staff ===
- Producer: Ahmet Zappa (boxset), Joe Travers (boxset, Blu-ray Audio), Jeff Fura (Blu-Ray Audio)
- Production Manager: Melanie Starks
- Engineer [recorded by]: Barry Keene (Petit Wazoo – Live)
- Engineer [tweezed by]: Davey Moire ("Approximate")
- Mixed by: Craig Parker Adams, Erich Gobel (surround mix), Karma Auger (surround mix), John Polito (Petit Wazoo – Live)
- Mastered by: John Polito
- Mastered by [Hi-Res Stereo]: Robert Hadley (Blu-ray Audio), Sangwook "Sunny" Nam (Blu-ray Audio), Doug Sax (Blu-ray Audio)
- Art Direction, Design: Michael Mesker
- Artwork [Original Art Elements], Typography [Original]: Cal Schenkel
- Authoring, Design [Blu-ray]: Meedja
- Liner Notes: Joe Travers, Scott Parker
- Transferred by: Joe Travers
