= Little Dots =

Live album by Frank Zappa
- Released: November 4, 2016
- Recorded: October–December 1972
- Genre: Jazz fusion, progressive rock
- Length: 71:07
- Label: Zappa Records
- Producer: Original recordings and mixes produced by Frank Zappa; Produced for release by Ahmet Zappa & Joe Travers

Frank Zappa chronology
Chicago '78 (2016)	Little Dots (2016)	Halloween 77 (2017)

Professional ratings
Review scores
Source	Rating
AllMusic	3.5/5 stars

Little Dots is a live album by Frank Zappa, released in November 2016, consisting of recordings from the 1972 Petit Wazoo tour. It is the conceptual sequel to 2006's Imaginary Diseases, also featuring performances from the 1972 Petit Wazoo tour.

== Track listing ==
All tracks are written by Frank Zappa.

No.	Title	Recording venue and date	Length
1.	"Cosmik Debris"	DAR Constitution Hall, November 11, 1972	5:40
2.	"Little Dots (Part 1)"	Park Center Arena, November 4, 1972	11:00
3.	"Little Dots (Part 2)"	Park Center Arena, November 4, 1972	12:59
4.	"Rollo (includes: Rollo/ The Rollo Interior Area/ Rollo Goes Out)"	Cowtown Ballroom, December 2, 1972	9:04
5.	"Kansas City Shuffle"	Cowtown Ballroom, December 2, 1972	6:46
6.	"Columbia, S.C. (Part 1)"	Township Auditorium, November 5, 1972	8:58
7.	"Columbia, S.C. (Part 2)"	Township Auditorium, November 5, 1972	16:40

== Personnel ==
Musicians

- Frank Zappa – Conductor, Guitar, Vocals
- Malcolm McNab – Trumpet
- Gary Barone – Trumpet
- Tom Malone – Tuba/Saxes/Piccolo Trumpet/Trumpet
- Earl Dumler – Woodwinds
- Glenn Ferris – Trombone
- Bruce Fowler – Trombone
- Tony Duran – Slide Guitar
- Dave Parlato – Bass
- Jim Gordon – Drums, Steel Drum
- Maury Baker – Drums, Steel Drum (“Columbia, SC”)

Production

- 1972 4-Track ½-inch analog tape show masters recorded by Barry Keene
- Mix Engineers: Frank Zappa, Michael Braunstein, Kerry McNabb
- Mastering: Gavin Lurssen & Reuben Cohen at Lurssen Mastering, 2016
- Audio Transfers and Compilation by Joe Travers, UMRK 2016
