= Feeding the Monkies at Ma Maison =

Album by Frank Zappa

Compilation album by Frank Zappa
- Released: September 22, 2011
- Recorded: 1986
- Studio: UMRK
- Genre: Electronic
- Length: 55:20
- Labels: Zappa Records; Catalog Number: ZR 20012
- Producer: Frank Zappa

Frank Zappa chronology
Hammersmith Odeon (2010)	Feeding the Monkies at Ma Maison (2011)	Carnegie Hall (2011)

Professional ratings
Review scores
Source	Rating
AllMusic	4/5 stars

Feeding the Monkies at Ma Maison is an album by Frank Zappa, which was released posthumously in 2011 by The Zappa Family Trust on Zappa Records.

== History ==
Executed by Frank Zappa on his Synclavier at the Utility Muffin Research Kitchen circa 1986, it was originally intended as a vinyl release. It has been cited as a missing link between Jazz from Hell (1986) and Civilization Phaze III (1994). Of the track "Worms from Hell" 28 seconds first appeared as opening title music for the Video from Hell VHS release in 1987.

== Track listing ==
All tracks are written by Frank Zappa.

No.	Title	Length
1.	"Feeding the Monkies at Ma Maison"	20:12
2.	"Buffalo Voice"	11:34
3.	"Secular Humanism"	6:37

CD version bonus tracks
No.	Title	Length
4.	"Worms from Hell"	5:31
5.	"Samba Funk"	11:29

== Personnel ==
- Frank Zappa – synclavier
- Moon Zappa – vocals
