= Dance Me This =

Studio album by Frank Zappa
- Released: June 21, 2015
- Recorded: 1993
- Studio: UMRK
- Length: 48:20
- Label: Zappa Records; Catalog Number: ZR 20018
- Producer: Frank Zappa

Frank Zappa chronology
Roxy by Proxy (2014)	Dance Me This (2015)	200 Motels: The Suites (2015)

Dance Me This is an album by Frank Zappa. Released posthumously in June 2015, it was among the last releases completed by Zappa before his death, along with The Rage & The Fury: The Music Of Edgard Varèse, Trance-Fusion and Civilization Phaze III.

== Overview ==
In the liner notes, Todd Yvega comments, "It is remarkable that Frank was able to construct such a cohesive arc, juxtaposing and superimposing such disparate materials, some of which had been in the works for years, while others were the fruit of the previous week's happenstance. Thrown into the creative mix were the incidentals (it was FZ's bent to be open to changing course and making use of whatever happens along). Earlier that year, on February 15, 1993 - the Zappa family hosted a birthday party for Matt Groening; in attendance was a trio of throat singers from Tuva in southern Siberia who were on a U.S. concert tour. Naturally a recording session ensued, and the Tuvans' vocals ultimately became prominent on several tracks. Dweezil had set up his guitar rig in the studio, and Frank decided to take it for a spin overdubbing on the piece we were tracking that day. As far as we know, that was the last time he played guitar."

Prior to his death, Zappa described Dance Me This as "a Synclavier album [...] which is designed to be used by modern dance groups."

== Track listing ==
All tracks are written by Frank Zappa, except where noted.

No.	Title	Length
1.	"Dance Me This"	2:01
2.	"Pachuco Gavotte"	3:27
3.	"Wolf Harbor"	8:02
4.	"Wolf Harbor II"	6:53
5.	"Wolf Harbor III"	6:09
6.	"Wolf Harbor IV"	3:38
7.	"Wolf Harbor V"	3:09
8.	"Goat Polo"	3:04
9.	"Rykoniki"	1:59
10.	"Piano"	7:09
11.	"Calculus" (Todd Yvega, Frank Zappa)	2:49

== Personnel ==
- Frank Zappa – guitar, Synclavier
- Anatolii Kuular, Kaigal-ool Khovalyg, Kongar-ool Ondar – vocals
- Todd Yvega – algorithm and Synclavier assistance
