= Cucamonga (album) =

Compilation album by Frank Zappa
- Released: February 17, 1998/September 14, 2004
- Recorded: 1963–1964
- Genre: Surf music, doo-wop, garage rock, rock and roll
- Label: Del-Fi Records/Rhino Records

Frank Zappa chronology
Strictly Genteel (1997)	Cucamonga (1998)	Cheap Thrills (1998)

Cucamonga is a compilation album consisting of songs recorded with the involvement of Frank Zappa and Paul Buff at Pal Recording Studio in 1963-1964. In 2004, Rhino Records re-released the album with extra tracks and a new track order, after acquiring Del-Fi. The two songs performed by Paul Buff and the two songs performed by the Pauls have no Zappa involvement.

== Track listing 1998 version ==
1. "Dear Jeepers" – Bob Guy
2. "World's Greatest Sinner" – Baby Ray & The Ferns
3. "How's Your Bird" – Baby Ray & The Ferns
4. "Every Time I See You" – The Heartbreakers
5. "Cradle Rock" – The Heartbreakers
6. "Slow Bird" – Paul Buff
7. "Blind Man's Buff" – Paul Buff
8. "Mr. Clean" – Mr. Clean
9. "Jesse Lee" – Mr. Clean
10. "Cathy My Angel" – The Pauls
11. "'Til September" – The Pauls
12. "Heavies" – The Rotations
13. "The Cruncher" – The Rotations
14. "Letter from Jeepers" – Bob Guy

== Track listing 2004 version ==
1. Dear Jeepers - Bob Guy
2. Memories of El Monte - The Penguins
3. How's Your Bird? - Baby Ray & The Ferns
4. World's Greatest Sinner - Baby Ray & The Ferns
5. Everytime I See You - The Heartbreakers
6. Cradle Rock - The Heartbreakers
7. Slow Bird - Paul Buff
8. Blind Man's Buff - Paul Buff
9. Tijuana Surf - The Hollywood Persuaders
10. Grunion Run - The Hollywood Persuaders
11. Mr. Clean - Mr. Clean
12. Jessie Lee - Mr. Clean
13. Cathy My Angel - The Pauls
14. 'Til September - The Pauls
15. Heavies - The Rotations
16. The Cruncher - The Rotations
17. Letter from Jeepers - Bob Guy
