= Cocaine Decisions =

Single by Frank Zappa

from the album The Man from Utopia
- B-side: "SEX"
- Released: 1982
- Recorded: 1982
- Genre: Jazz rock; comedy rock
- Length: 2:56
- Label: Barking Pumpkin
- Songwriter: Frank Zappa
- Producer: Frank Zappa

Frank Zappa singles chronology
"The Man From Utopia Meets Mary Lou" (1983)	"Cocaine Decisions" (1982)	"Baby Take Your Teeth Out" (1984)

"Cocaine Decisions" is a 1983 single by American musician Frank Zappa, from his 36th album The Man from Utopia. A live version was on the album You Can't Do That on Stage Anymore, Vol. 3 (1989). It was played in concert from 1981 to 1984.

== Meaning ==
Zappa had earlier anti-drug songs including "Who Needs the Peace Corps?" from We're Only in It for the Money (1968), "Cosmik Debris" from Apostrophe (') (1974), "Charlie's Enormous Mouth" from You Are What You Is (1981), and "I Come From Nowhere" from Ship Arriving Too Late to Save a Drowning Witch (1982). Though unlike the hippies, drug dealers, youth, and junkies mentioned in previous songs, the targets of this song are instead rich Wall Street executives, doctors, and lawyers. Specifically the lyrics...

"I don't wanna know 'bout the things that you pull
Outta your nose, or where they goes
But if you are wasted
from the stuff you're stickin' in it
I get madder every day
'cause what you do 'n' what you say
affects my life in such a way
I learn to hate it every minute!"

...are targeted at music business executives. The vocals display a tone making it one of Zappa's more angry songs. In 2000, the CMJ Music Marathon magazine jokingly stated that "Cocaine Decisions" would be a great song to characterize presidential candidate George W. Bush.

== Riot ==
During a concert in Palermo, Italy in 1982, a riot occurred during "Cocaine Decisions" in which the police shot tear gas into the crowd. Zappa was reported stating "We played for an hour and a half with tear-gas in our face and everything else, and when it was all over we went off stage and we were trapped inside this place". The riot inspired the back cover of the album The Man from Utopia.

== Track listing ==
A. "Cocaine Decisions" – 2:56
B. "SEX" – 3:00
