= Congress Shall Make No Law... =

Compilation album by Frank Zappa
- Released: September 19, 2010
- Recorded: 1985–1993, various locations
- Genre: Spoken word
- Length: 63:50
- Label: Zappa Records
- Producer: Gail Zappa

Frank Zappa chronology
| Greasy Love Songs (2010) | "Congress Shall Make No Law..." (2010) | Hammersmith Odeon (2010) |

"Congress Shall Make No Law..." is an album by Frank Zappa, released posthumously in 2010 by the Zappa Family Trust on Zappa Records. It contains a full recording of Zappa's September 19, 1985 testimony before the United States Senate Committee on Commerce, Science and Transportation, during which he spoke in support of the recording industry and against censorship. In his testimony, Zappa criticized the Parents Music Resource Center, formed in 1985 with the stated goal of increasing parental control over the access of children to recordings deemed to have violent, drug-related or sexual themes by labeling them with Parental Advisory stickers. The album's release commemorates the 25th anniversary of the hearings.

The album's title refers to the First Amendment to the United States Constitution, which states,

"Congress shall make no law respecting an establishment of religion, or prohibiting the free exercise thereof; or abridging the freedom of speech, or of the press; or the right of the people peaceably to assemble, and to petition the government for a redress of grievances."

In a press release, Gail Zappa said of the album,

"'Congress Shall Make No Law...' is released as an educational project, representing Zappa's tireless commitment to the First Amendment which he felt his duty to protect by providing (in his words) "stimulating digital audio entertainment" in the form of "material which a truly free society would neither fear nor suppress."

"Congress Shall Make No Law..." also includes Zappa's testimony before the Maryland State Legislature the following year, as well as various quotes and interview excerpts on the subject of censorship and an alternate version of the piece "Reagan at Bitburg", one of the last pieces Zappa finished before his death in 1993. The track was first released on his 1994 album Civilization Phaze III. Most of the tracks are named after the Ten Commandments, each corresponding to the particular topic of Zappa's opinion.

== Track listing ==
All music is composed by Frank Zappa.

| No. | Title | Length |
|---|---|---|
| 1. | "Congress Shall Make No Law" | 32:46 |
| 2. | "Perhaps in Maryland" | 10:54 |
| 3. | "Thou shalt have no other gods before Me" | 2:56 |
| 4. | "Thou shalt not make unto thee any graven image - any likeness of anything in heaven above, nor in the earth beneath, nor in the water under the earth" | 2:31 |
| 5. | "Thou shalt not take the name of the Lord thy God in vain" | 2:26 |
| 6. | "Thou shalt keep holy the Sabbath day" | 2:05 |
| 7. | "Thou shalt honor thy father and thy mother" | 2:21 |
| 8. | "Thou shalt not Kill" | 2:06 |
| 9. | "Thou shalt not commit adultery" | 0:55 |
| 10. | "Thou shalt not steal" | 0:39 |
| 11. | "Thou shalt not bear false witness against thy neighbor" | 1:48 |
| 12. | "Thou shalt not covet the house of thy neighbor, the wife of thy neighbor, nor his male servant, nor his female servant, nor his ass, nor anything that belongs to thy neighbor" | 1:13 |
| 13. | "Reagan at Bitburg Some More" | 1:10 |

== Personnel ==
- Gail Zappa – CD producer; program assemblage with Joe Travers and a little help from Todd Yvega; art direction, concept & text
- Frank Zappa – music composer, performer & recorder; burp art performances producer & conductor; spoken words; statements audio selecting and transferring
- Jade Teta – burp art performances
- Joe Travers – vaultmeisterment for UMRK
- Moses – 10 Commandments transcription
- John Polito – mastering & audio restoration
- American Artist Bill Miller – "Congress Shall Make No Law" - reclaimed vintage linoleum assemblage
- Larry Stein – liner notes
- Michael Mesker – layout design & execution & cover photo
- Diva Zappa – Frank Zappa bust photo in Vilnius
- Melanie Starks – production management
- Kurt Morgan & Susan Ledgerwood – research & seizure
- Jack – archgoatliness
