= The Torture Never Stops (song) =

1976 song by Frank Zappa

Song by Frank Zappa

from the album Zoot Allures
- Recorded: 1976
- Genre: Blues rock
- Length: 9:45
- Songwriter: Frank Zappa

"The Torture Never Stops" is a song by Frank Zappa from the 1976 album Zoot Allures. Other versions appear on Zappa in New York, Thing-Fish, You Can't Do That on Stage Anymore, Vol. 1, You Can't Do That on Stage Anymore, Vol. 4, The Best Band You Never Heard in Your Life, FZ:OZ, Cheap Thrills, Buffalo, Philly '76, and Hammersmith Odeon.

Zappa played "The Torture Never Stops" in concert from 1975 to 1978, in 1981 and again in 1988.

The song debuted in 1975 as "Why Doesn't Somebody Get Him a Pepsi?" though few of the instrument parts were similar to the album version. Critics have written that while performing the song, Zappa comes off as calm yet passive-aggressive. Michel Delville, in his essay Frank Zappa, Captain Beefheart and the Secret History of Maximalism contrasted the tone of "The Torture Never Stops" with Brian Eno's album Ambient 1: Music for Airports.

== Rat Tomago ==
"Rat Tomago"

Song by Frank Zappa

from the album Sheik Yerbouti
- Recorded: 1978
- Genre: Rock, Instrumental rock
- Length: 5:17
- Songwriter: Frank Zappa

A live solo from the song, called "Rat Tomago", appears on the 1979 album Sheik Yerbouti. It contains the same basic structure, bass line, and female moaning as "The Torture Never Stops". "Rat Tomago" was nominated for the inaugural Grammy Award for Best Rock Instrumental Performance in 1980, but lost to Paul McCartney and Wings' "Rockestra Theme".

== Personnel ==
Studio version

- Frank Zappa – guitar, bass, keyboards, lead vocals
- Terry Bozzio – drums
