= The Black Page =

Piece of music by Frank Zappa

"The Black Page #1" is a piece by American composer Frank Zappa known for being extraordinarily difficult to play. Originally written for the drum kit and melodic percussion (as "The Black Page Drum Solo"), the piece was later rearranged in several versions, including the "easy teenage New York version" (commonly referred to as "The Black Page #2") and a so-called "new-age version", among others.

Drummer Terry Bozzio said of the piece:

He wrote it, because we had done this 40-piece orchestra gig together and he was always hearing the studio musicians in LA, that he was musing on that, talking about the fear of going into sessions some morning and being faced with "the black page". So he decided to write his "Black Page". Then he gave it to me, and I could play parts of it right away. But it wasn't a pressure thing, it just sat on my music stand and for about 15 minutes every day for 2 weeks, before we would rehearse, I would work on it. And after 2 weeks I had it together and I played it for him. And he said, "Great!", took it home, wrote the melody and the chord changes, brought it back in. And we all started playing it.

"The Black Page Drum Solo/Black Page #1"
One of Zappa's complex, percussion-based compositions featured on Zappa in New York.

On the double live album Zappa in New York (recorded 12/1976, released 3/1978), Zappa noted the "statistical density" of the piece. It is written in common time with extensive use of tuplets, including tuplets inside tuplets (nested tuplets). At several points there is a quarter note triplet (sixth notes) in which each beat is counted with its own tuplet of 5, 5 and 6; at another is a half note triplet (third notes) in which the second beat septuplet, and the third beat is divided into tuplets of 4 and 5. The song ends with a quarter note triplet composed of tuplets of 5, 5, and 6, followed by two tuplets of 11 in the space of one.

Zappa would re-arrange the song into "The Black Page #2" shortly after his band's mastery of the piece. This second version has a disco beat, but nevertheless retains nearly every metric complexity from #1. One notable difference in this version is that the final set of tuplets feature a rhythmic change and are repeated three times to conclude the song. The 1991 live album Make a Jazz Noise Here includes a so-called "new age version", which incorporates lounge and reggae music. The 1991 album You Can't Do That on Stage Anymore, Vol. 4 featured a performance from 1984 that had a ska motif. Both of these versions included guitar solos from Zappa.

== Performances ==
In 2001, Terry Bozzio and Chad Wackerman released the video "Solos and Duets" which features "The Black Page" played as a duet between the two ex-Zappa drummers with a transcription of the piece scrolling along the bottom of the screen as it is being played. In 2006, "The Black Page" was featured on Zappa Plays Zappa - Tour de Frank, an ambitious effort by Dweezil Zappa to bring Zappa music to the stage again, played by himself and a new band. The 2006 tour also included, as special guests, Zappa alumni; singer & woodwind player Napoleon Murphy Brock, drummer Bozzio, and guitarist Steve Vai. In the 2006 shows, "The Black Page" was played first as a drum solo by Bozzio and then a second time as a guitar duet with Steve Vai.

In 2014 "The Black Page" was immortalized by Terry Bozzio in the form of art he calls Rhythm & Sketch. On canvas Terry's sketch of Zappa with "The Black Page" is layered with a rhythmic pattern of light traces from Terry's drumsticks. This was a limited run of 25 canvases and sold out quickly.

Drummer Morgan Ågren and guitarist Mike Keneally played the piece as an encore during Devin Townsend's "Empath Vol. 1" - Tour in 2019/2020.
