= Sheik Yerbouti =

Live album with studio elements by Frank Zappa
- Released: March 3, 1979
- Recorded: Mostly: January 25–27 & February 28, 1978, Hammersmith Odeon, London, UK; October 30–31, 1977, The Palladium, NYC
- Studio: The Manor Mobile
- Genres: Experimental rock; comedy rock
- Length: 74:03
- Labels: Zappa; CBS International
- Producer: Frank Zappa

Frank Zappa chronology
Sleep Dirt (1979)	Sheik Yerbouti (1979)	Orchestral Favorites (1979)

Singles from Sheik Yerbouti
- 1. "Dancin' Fool" Released: 1979; 2. "Bobby Brown" Released: 1979

Sheik Yerbouti is the twenty-sixth album by American musician Frank Zappa, a double album released on March 3, 1979, as the first release on Zappa Records; it was distributed by Phonogram Inc. in the United States and Canada. The album was released in other countries by CBS Records. It is mostly made up of live material recorded in 1977 and 1978, with extensive overdubs added in the studio. In an October 1978 interview, Zappa gave the working album title as Martian Love Secrets. It was later released on a single CD.

Sheik Yerbouti is Zappa's biggest selling album with over 2 million units sold worldwide.

== Inspiration ==
Zappa appears on the cover in character in Arab headdress. The title is a play on words and is pronounced like the 1976 disco hit "Shake Your Booty" by KC and the Sunshine Band.

"Bobby Brown"

The album has some of Zappa's most satirical and controversial lyrics. "Bobby Brown" was banned from US airplay due to its sexually explicit lyrics. "I Have Been in You" pokes fun at Peter Frampton's 1977 hit "I'm in You" while emphasizing an explicit meaning. "Dancin' Fool", a Grammy nominee, became a popular disco hit despite its obvious parodical reflection of disco music. "Flakes", about lazy union workers in California, includes a parody of Bob Dylan. "Jewish Princess", a humorous look at Jewish stereotyping, attracted attention from the Anti-Defamation League, to which Zappa denied an apology, arguing: "Unlike the unicorn, such creatures do exist—and deserve to be 'commemorated' with their own special opus".

"Rat Tomago" was edited from a live performance of "The Torture Never Stops", which originally appeared on Zoot Allures (1976); likewise, "The Sheik Yerbouti Tango" is taken from a live version of "Little House I Used to Live in", originally recorded for Burnt Weeny Sandwich in 1970.

Some of the songs also appeared in Baby Snakes, Zappa's 1979 concert film. A clip of "City of Tiny Lites" with clay animation by Bruce Bickford was shown on the Old Grey Whistle Test.

== Writing and recording ==
Songs on side two, such as "Rat Tomago", are linked by brief pieces of musique concrète, and studio dialog from Zappa band members Terry Bozzio and Patrick O'Hearn. In making "Rubber Shirt", Zappa combined a track of Bozzio playing drums in one musical setting with one of O'Hearn playing the bass in another. The original performances differed in time signature and in tempo. Zappa described this technique as xenochrony.

The album was engineered by Joe Chiccarelli. He later explained: "[Zappa's] engineer couldn’t make the session and so he decided to take a chance on me. I’m so thankful ever since that day because he gave me a career."

== Critical reception ==
Professional ratings
Review scores
Source	Rating
AllMusic	4/5 stars
Christgau's Record Guide	C
Music Week	4/4 stars
Rolling Stone	(favorable)

Initially, the album was met with mixed reviews, due to the lyrical content. Despite this, the album remains a cult favorite among Zappa fans to this day. The song "Bobby Brown" was extremely popular in Scandinavia. Zappa was reportedly so astounded by its success that he wanted CBS to hire an anthropologist to study why the song became such a big hit.

In a 1979 review of this album Robert Christgau wrote: "If this be social 'satire,' how come its sole targets are ordinary citizens whose weirdnesses happen to diverge from those of the retentive gent at the control board? Or are we to read his new fixation on buggery as an indication of approval? Makes you wonder whether his primo guitar solo on 'Yo' Mama' and those as-unique-as-they-used-to-be rhythms and textures are as arid spiritually as he is. As if there were any question after all these years." In response to Christgau's review, Zappa said: "Let me tell you about guys like that: they’re gnats, they’re xxxxing gnats. They ought to be licensed to, touch a typewriter. [...] So what am I supposed to do? Go around and tell everyone how moral I am because Robert Christgau thinks I’m immoral? The guy’s a xxxxing pinhead, let’s face it."

== Track listing ==
All tracks are written by Frank Zappa, except where noted.

Side one
No.	Title	Recording dates and venues; amounts of over-dubs	Length
1.	"I Have Been in You"	Basic track: January 25, 1978 – Hammersmith Odeon, London, UK; Over-dubs: lots of 'em	3:33
2.	"Flakes"	Basic track: January 25, 1978 – Hammersmith Odeon, London, UK; Over-dubs: lots	6:41
3.	"Broken Hearts Are for Assholes"	Basic track: January 27, 1978 – Hammersmith Odeon, London, UK; Over-dubs: lots	3:42
4.	"I'm So Cute"	Basic track: January 25–27 or February 28, 1978 – Hammersmith Odeon, London, UK; Over-dubs: lots Ending cropped on some CD and cassette reissues, reducing the run time to 3:09; restored on 2012 remaster.	4:27
Total length:			18:57

Side two
No.	Title	Recording dates and venues; amounts of over-dubs	Length
5.	"Jones Crusher"	Basic track: October 31, 1977 – The Palladium, NYC; Over-dubs: feedback guitar	2:49
6.	"What Ever Happened to All the Fun in the World"	incl. a quotation from "I Have Seen The Pleated Gazelle", recorded at Pinewood Studios, London, January–February 1971	0:33
7.	"Rat Tomago" (Composition co-credited to Frank and Ahmet Zappa on the 2012 CD – a note states that "'Rat Tomago' is Ahmet Zappa's title")	Guitar solo from "The Torture Never Stops" played live on February 15, 1978 – Deutschlandhalle, Berlin, Germany; Over-dubs: none	5:17
8.	"We've Got to Get into Something Real" (Listed under the title "Wait a Minute" on the CD version)		0:31
9.	"Bobby Brown" (Listed under the title "Bobby Brown Goes Down" on the CD version)	Basic track: January 27, 1978 – Hammersmith Odeon, London, UK; Over-dubs: lots	2:49
10.	"Rubber Shirt" (Zappa/Bozzio/O'Hearn)	Bass part recorded as a studio overdub on a guitar solo from September 25, 1974 – Gothenburg, Sweden	2:45
11.	"The Sheik Yerbouti Tango" (Listed as simply "The Sheik Yerbouti" on some CD copies)	Basic track: Guitar solo from "The Little House I Used to Live in" played live on February 15, 1978 – Deutschlandhalle, Berlin, Germany; Over-dubs: none	3:56
Total length:			19:22

Side three
No.	Title	Recording dates and venues; amounts of over-dubs	Length
12.	"Baby Snakes"	Basic track: January 25, 1978 – Hammersmith Odeon, London, UK; Over-dubs: lots	1:50
13.	"Tryin' to Grow a Chin"	Basic track: January 27, 1978 – Hammersmith Odeon, London, UK; Over-dubs: a few	3:31
14.	"City of Tiny Lites"	Basic track: January 27, 1978 – Hammersmith Odeon, London, UK; Over-dubs: a few	5:32
15.	"Dancin' Fool"	Basic track: February 28, 1978 – Hammersmith Odeon, London, UK; Over-dubs: lots	3:43
16.	"Jewish Princess"	Basic track: October 30, 1977 – The Palladium, NYC; Over-dubs: lots	3:16
Total length:			18:25

Side four
No.	Title	Recording dates and venues; amounts of over-dubs	Length
17.	"Wild Love"	Basic track: February 28, 1978 – Hammersmith Odeon, London, UK; Over-dubs: lots	4:09
18.	"Yo' Mama"	Basic track for vocal sections: February 28, 1978 – Hammersmith Odeon, London, UK; Guitar solo: February 25, 1978 – Hemmerleinhalle, Neunkirchen am Brand, Germany; Basic track for middle of guitar solo: January 27, 1978 – Hammersmith Odeon, London, UK; Over-dubs: lots	12:36
Total length:			16:45

Dates and venue information from Information Is Not Knowledge

== Personnel ==
=== Musicians ===
- Frank Zappa – lead guitar, lead (1–3, 9, 12, 15–18) and backing vocals, arranger, composer, producer, remixing
- Davey Moire – lead (6, 8) and backing vocals, engineer
- Napoleon Murphy Brock – lead (17) and backing vocals
- Andre Lewis – backing vocals
- Randy Thornton – lead (17) and backing vocals
- Adrian Belew – rhythm guitar, lead (5, 14) and backing vocals, Bob Dylan impersonation (2)
- Tommy Mars – keyboards, backing and lead (17) vocals
- Peter Wolf – keyboards, butter, Flora margarine
- Patrick O'Hearn – bass, lead (3, 6, 8) and backing vocals
- Terry Bozzio – drums, lead (3, 4, 6, 8, 13, 17) and backing vocals
- Ed Mann – percussion, backing vocals
- David Ocker – clarinet (17)

=== Production staff ===
- Joe Chiccarelli – remixing, overdub engineer
- Lynn Goldsmith – photography, cover photo
- Peter Henderson – engineer
- Jon Walls – engineer
- Bob Ludwig – mastering engineer
- Kerry McNabb – engineer
- John Williams – art direction
- Gail Zappa – photography
- Amy Bernstein – artwork, layout design
- Barbara Isaak – assistant
- Bob Ludwig – mastering (original LP), remastering (2012 CD and 2015 LP reissue)
- Bob Stone – digital remastering (1989, used on 1990 and 1995 CDs)

== Charts ==
=== Weekly charts ===
Chart (1979)	Peak position
Australian Albums (Kent Music Report)	52
Austrian Albums (Ö3 Austria)	6
Canadian Albums (RPM)	13
Dutch Albums (Album Top 100)	21
French Albums (SNEP)	5
German Albums (Offizielle Top 100)	10
New Zealand Albums (RMNZ)	36
Norwegian Albums (VG-lista)	5
Swedish Albums (Sverigetopplistan)	4
UK Albums (Official Charts)	32
US Billboard 200	21

=== Year-end charts ===
Chart (1979–1980)	Position
Canadian Albums (RPM)	88
German Albums (Offizielle Top 100)	56
US Billboard 200	92

== Certifications and sales ==
Region	Certification	Certified units/sales
Canada (Music Canada)	Gold	50,000^{^}
Germany (BVMI)	Gold	250,000^{^}
^{^} Shipments figures based on certification alone.
