= Joe's Garage (song) =

Single by Frank Zappa

from the album Joe's Garage Act I
- Released: 1979
- Genre: Rock
- Length: 6:10 (album version); 4:08 (single version)
- Label: CBS Records
- Songwriter: Frank Zappa
- Producer: Frank Zappa

Frank Zappa singles chronology
"Bobby Brown (Goes Down)" (1979)	"Joe's Garage" (1979)	"Stick It Out" (1979)

Official audio
- "Joe's Garage" on YouTube

"Joe's Garage" is a single on Frank Zappa's 1979 album Joe's Garage Act I. After the introductory track, "The Central Scrutinizer", this song begins the story of Joe's Garage. Although it only charted in Norway and Sweden (where it was a top 20 hit in both countries), it was one of Zappa's songs which had the most airplay on American FM radio, at the time still album-centered. The song was played in concert from 1980 to 1988 along with the song "Why Does it Hurt When I Pee?" in all tours of Zappa's after the single's release. The single version of the song lacks many of the special effects that the album version contains. The single version of "Joe's Garage" was put onto Zappa's best-of Strictly Commercial.

== The story ==
The song introduces the main character Joe and another band member, Larry Fanoga. It explains that Joe, Larry, and their friends were in a band together in Joe's garage, in Canoga Park, Los Angeles, and would play the same simple, repetitive three-chord song. This was a mocking commentary on many garage and punk bands of the era. They started to play this one song in a go go bar and eventually their repetitive music became well enough known where they were offered a record deal, but when the promised "good times" never materialized, the band abruptly broke up. The song then flashes back to the band playing a distorted parody of their song in the garage at a loud and annoying volume, much to the chagrin of Joe's mother and a complaining neighbor.

As the years go past, heavy metal, glam rock ("snotty boys with lipsick on"), disco and new wave each successively become popular, the band's song comes back into style and it is implied they reunite, when the same complaining neighbor calls the police who, with car sirens blaring, surround the garage. Then it's explained that this is "Joe's first confrontation with the law," implying that later in the story he would have more trouble with the police. The officer lets him off. The Central Scrutinizer explains that Joe was advised to "stick closer to church oriented social activities" – a reference to how adults of the era felt religion was a good cleanser of the evil sins of rock.

== Overture ==
The song foreshadows musical styles to be later used in the album such as sleigh bells more prominent in "Why Does it Hurt When I Pee?" an odd-sounding guitar line used in "He Used to Cut the Grass", and the line "It makes its own sauce if you add water" (a slogan for Gravy Train dog food) is later stated in the song "Crew Slut." These foreshadowings make the song more of an overture to the album.

== Themes ==
The underlying themes of the song as well as most of the album was based upon Zappa's hatred for censorship, corporate abuse, and untalented bands becoming famous. The song was more commercial sounding than most of the other tracks on the album because it was intended to be a single as well as the main song on the album.

== Differences live ==
When played live, the song tended to be played at a faster tempo as well as having inside jokes inserted into it.

== Track listing ==
7" single (CBS 7950)

- A. "Joe's Garage" – 4:07
- B. "Catholic Girls" – 4:00

== Charts ==
Chart (1979)	Peak position
Norway (VG-lista)	4
Sweden (Sverigetopplistan)	14
