= Dancin' Fool =

Single by Frank Zappa

from the album Sheik Yerbouti
- Released: 1979
- Recorded: 1979
- Genre: Comedy rock; disco
- Length: 6:15 (12" version)
- Label: CBS Records
- Songwriter: Frank Zappa
- Producer: Frank Zappa

Frank Zappa singles chronology
| "Disco Boy" (1976) | "Dancin' Fool" (1979) | "Bobby Brown (Goes Down)" (1979) |

"Dancin' Fool" is a song by Frank Zappa from his 1979 album Sheik Yerbouti. It was the first of two singles released from the album, followed by "Bobby Brown (Goes Down)." The song premiered on stage on October 30, 1977.

"Dancin' Fool" peaked at #45 on the U.S. Billboard Hot 100 chart on May 26, 1979. It was Zappa's highest-charting U.S. single to that point, only surpassed later by his 1982 song "Valley Girl". "Dancin' Fool" was nominated for the Grammy award for "Best Male Vocal", but it did not win. It was later included on the compilation Strictly Commercial.

== Background ==
Much like Zoot Allures' closing track "Disco Boy", it mocks the disco culture of the 1970s, but unlike "Disco Boy", the song directly focuses on the dancing aspect of the culture. Specifically, the character Zappa is singing that he cannot help but dance, despite how awful he is at it. He refers to his dancing as "social suicide" and says, "The beat goes on and I'm so wrong." He mentions as part of the reason for his bad dancing that, "One of my legs is shorter than the other," a reference to a severe injury Zappa sustained at the Rainbow Theatre in 1971.

== Saturday Night Live ==
On October 21, 1978, Zappa was a guest host and musician for Saturday Night Live. After the episode, he was banned from the show for "being difficult". Many in the cast, save Laraine Newman and John Belushi, were standoffish the entire night. The songs he performed were "Dancin' Fool", "The Meek Shall Inherit Nothing", and "Rollo". The SNL performance gave Zappa some of his most widespread media attention in the US.

== Track listing ==
7"
A."Dancin' Fool" - 3:45
B."Baby Snakes" - 2:02

U.S. 12" (MK-83)
A."Dancin' Fool" - 6:15
B."Dancin' Fool" - 6:15

== Chart performance ==
| Chart (1979) | Peak position |
|---|---|
| US Billboard Hot 100 | 45 |
