= Bobby Brown (song) =

Single by Frank Zappa

from the album Sheik Yerbouti
- Released: March 3, 1979
- Recorded: 1978
- Genre: Comedy rock; experimental
- Length: 2:49
- Label: CBS
- Songwriter: Frank Zappa
- Producer: Frank Zappa

Frank Zappa singles chronology
| "Dancin' Fool" (1979) | "Bobby Brown" (1979) | "Joe's Garage" (1979) |

Audio sample
- file; help

"Bobby Brown (Goes Down)" is a song by American musician Frank Zappa released on his double album Sheik Yerbouti (1979). The song was successful in Europe, where it was a number-one-hit in Norway and Sweden, number 4 in Germany, and was featured on the vinyl and European CD version of Zappa's best of compilation, Strictly Commercial (1995).

== Plot ==
The song centers on Bobby Brown, a college age student whose life is the archetypical American Dream until a traumatic encounter with Freddie, a dyke from the women's liberation movement, transforms him into a leisure suit-wearing, closeted homosexual who works in radio promotions and engages in S&M.

Zappa was astounded by the song's surprise success in Europe given its pervasive vulgarity, and in an interview with Swedish radio, he remarked that he once suggested to his record label that they should hire an anthropologist to find out how and why it became so popular there.

== Track listing ==
Version 1:

A. "Bobby Brown" – 2:43
B. "Baby Snakes" – 1:50

Version 2:

A. "Bobby Brown" – 2:43
B. "Stick It Out" – 4:33

== Chart positions ==
=== Weekly charts ===
| Chart (1979–1991) | Peak position |
|---|---|
| Austria (Ö3 Austria Top 40) | 2 |
| Norway (VG-lista) | 1 |
| Sweden (Sverigetopplistan) | 1 |
| Switzerland (Schweizer Hitparade) | 5 |
| West Germany (GfK) | 4 |

=== Year-end charts ===
| Chart (1980) | Position |
|---|---|
| West Germany (Official German Charts) | 6 |

| Chart (1991) | Position |
|---|---|
| Austria (Ö3 Austria Top 40) | 7 |

=== Decade-end charts ===
| Chart (1990–1999) | Position |
|---|---|
| Austria (Ö3 Austria Top 40) | 34 |

== Certifications ==
| Region | Certification | Certified units/sales |
|---|---|---|
| Austria (IFPI Austria) | Gold | 50,000^{*} |
| Norway (IFPI Norway) | Gold | 5,000^{*} |
| Sweden (GLF) | Gold | 25,000^{^} |
| Switzerland (IFPI Switzerland) | Gold | 25,000^{^} |
^{*} Sales figures based on certification alone.^{^} Shipments figures based on certification alone.
