= Francesco Zappa (album) =

Album by Frank Zappa

Studio album by Frank Zappa
- Released: November 21, 1984
- Recorded: February – April 1984
- Studio: UMRK (Los Angeles)
- Genres: Chamber music, electronic
- Length: 37:46
- Label: Barking Pumpkin
- Producer: Frank Zappa

Frank Zappa chronology
Thing-Fish (1984)	Francesco Zappa (1984)	The Old Masters Box I (1985)

Professional ratings
Review scores
Source	Rating
Allmusic	2.5/5 stars

Francesco Zappa is a 1984 album by American musician Frank Zappa. It features synthesized arrangements of chamber music by Italian composer Francesco Zappa, who composed between 1763 and 1788.

== Album origins ==
According to recording engineer Mark Pinske, musician David Ocker introduced Francesco Zappa's music to Frank Zappa because it was popular with some college music students. Ocker discovered the music in what Pinske describes as "the Mormon library or something". The exact location where the scores were found was not specified by Pinske, but was possibly archives for the music department at Brigham Young University which is owned by the Church of Jesus Christ of Latter-day Saints (popularly known as Mormons). Frank initially thought Ocker was joking about an earlier composer who shared his name.

Frank Zappa was impressed by the scores and realized they were not copyrighted, and subsequently obtained a copyright for the works of Francesco Zappa. He then programmed some of these pieces into his new Synclavier synthesizer.

== Finding the composer's works ==
Frank found an entry for Francesco in the Grove Dictionary of Music and Musicians and then researched his sheet music in the library at UC Berkeley. While Frank and Francesco have similar first names and share the same surname, according to The Real Frank Zappa Book, the two musicians are not related.

== Album content ==
Francesco Zappa was the first full album on which Frank used the Synclavier, but Synclavier pieces appeared on The Perfect Stranger earlier that year, as well as Thing-Fish, also released in 1984 but recorded earlier.

== Track listing ==
All music is composed by Francesco Zappa.

Side one
No.	Title	Length
1.	"Opus I: No. 1 1st Movement: Andante"	3:32
2.	"Opus I: No. 1 2nd Movement: Allegro con brio"	1:27
3.	"Opus I: No. 2 1st Movement: Andantino"	2:14
4.	"Opus I: No. 2 2nd Movement: Minuetto grazioso"	2:04
5.	"Opus I: No. 3 1st Movement: Andantino"	1:52
6.	"Opus I: No. 3 2nd Movement: Presto"	1:50
7.	"Opus I: No. 4 1st Movement: Andante"	2:20
8.	"Opus I: No. 4 2nd Movement: Allegro"	3:04

Side two
No.	Title	Length
1.	"Opus I: No. 5 2nd Movement: Minuetto grazioso"	2:29
2.	"Opus I: No. 6 1st Movement: Largo"	2:08
3.	"Opus I: No. 6 2nd Movement: Minuet"	2:03
4.	"Opus IV: No. 1 1st Movement: Andantino"	2:47
5.	"Opus IV: No. 1 2nd Movement: Allegro assai"	2:02
6.	"Opus IV: No. 2 2nd Movement: Allegro assai"	1:20
7.	"Opus IV: No. 3 1st Movement: Andante"	2:24
8.	"Opus IV: No. 3 2nd Movement: Tempo di minuetto"	2:00
9.	"Opus IV: No. 4 1st Movement: Minuetto"	2:10

== Personnel ==
- Performed by The Barking Pumpkin Digital Gratification Consort (Frank Zappa, conductor)
- Produced and orchestrated by Frank Zappa
- Synclavier document encryption: David Ocker
- Engineered by Bob Stone & Mark Pinske
- Cover painting by Donald Roller Wilson
- Collage by Gabrielle Raumberger
- Graphics by New Age Art
