= Ensemble Ambrosius =

Ensemble Ambrosius is a Finnish chamber music group that plays modern music on baroque instruments. It originated in 1995 when three music students performed music of Frank Zappa at a school concert. They added a fourth member and began touring in 1997, adding original music to their repertoire. They have since increased to eight members and have produced two albums, The Zappa Album, and Metrix, the latter being original compositions blending classical, jazz, and rock.

== Members ==
=== Current members ===
- Olli Virtaperko (cello)
- Ere Lievonen (harpsichord)
- Eira Karlson (violin)
- Eija Kankaanranta (kantele)
- Susanne Kujala (organ)
- Veli Kujala (accordion)
- Joni Leino (drums)

=== Past members ===
- Jonte Knif (keyboards etc.)
- Matti Vanhamäki (baroque violin)
- Anni Haapaniemi (baroque oboe)
- Jani Sunnarborg (baroque bassoon)
- Tuukka Terho (archlute)
- Ricardo Padilla (percussion)
- Jasu Moisio (baroque oboe, 1995–2000)

== Albums ==
=== The Zappa Album ===
(Bis Records BIS-NL-CD-5013, 2000)

1. Night School
2. Sofa
3. Black Page #2
4. Uncle Meat
5. Igor's Boogie
6. Zoot Allures
7. Big Swifty
8. T'mershi Duween
9. Alien Orifice
10. The Idiot Bastard Son
11. Rdnzl
12. The Orange County Lumber Truck
13. Echidna's Arf (Of You)
14. Inca Roads
15. G-Spot Tornado

=== Metrix ===
(Ambrosius Entertainment AMBRACD 002, 2002)

1. Wällkommen II (Virtaperko & Knif)
2. Pienet sienet (Knif)
3. John (Virtaperko)
4. USO (Knif)
5. Momentum (Ensemble Ambrosius)
6. Metrix (Virtaperko)
7. Laiska Anni (Virtaperko)
8. Hymni (Virtaperko)
