= Frank Zappa =

American musician (1940–1993)

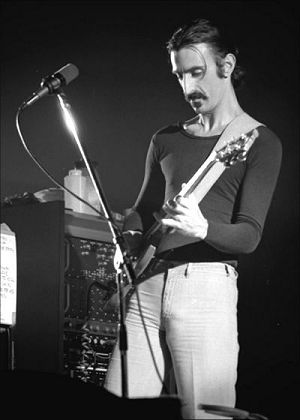
- Zappa performing at Ekeberghallen in Oslo, Norway, in 1977
- Born: Frank Vincent Zappa; December 21, 1940; Baltimore, Maryland, U.S.
- Died: December 4, 1993 (aged 52); Los Angeles, California, U.S.
- Resting place: Pierce Brothers Westwood Village Memorial Park and Mortuary
- Other names: Billy Dexter; Frank Vincent Zappa Jr.; Francis Vincent Zappa; LaMarr Bruister; Obdew'l X; Ruben Sano; Stucco Homes; Zappa
- Occupations: Composer; songwriter; conductor; actor; filmmaker
- Years active: 1955–1993
- Spouses: Kay Sherman (m. 1960; div. 1963); Gail Sloatman (m. 1967)
- Children: Moon; Dweezil; Ahmet; Diva
- Musical career
- Origin: Los Angeles, California, U.S.
- Genres: Rock; progressive rock; blues; experimental; jazz; fusion; classical; pop; avant-garde; doo-wop; comedy; electronic; musique concrète
- Instruments: Guitar; vocals; bass guitar; Synclavier; drums; percussion
- Works: Discography
- Labels: Verve; Bizarre; Straight; DiscReet; Zappa; Barking Pumpkin; Rykodisc
- Formerly of: The Mothers of Invention
- Website: zappa.com

Frank Vincent Zappa (Note: Until discovering his birth certificate as an adult, Zappa believed he had been christened "Francis Vincent Zappa" after his father, and he is credited as Francis on some of his early albums. However, the name on his birth certificate is "Frank".) (December 21, 1940 – December 4, 1993) was an American musician, actor, satirist, filmmaker, and activist. In a career spanning more than 30 years, Zappa composed rock, pop, jazz, jazz fusion, orchestral and musique concrète works; he additionally produced nearly all the 60-plus albums he released with his band the Mothers of Invention and as a solo artist. His discography is characterized by nonconformity, improvisation, sonic experimentation, musical virtuosity and satire of American culture. Zappa also directed feature-length films and music videos, and designed album covers. He is considered one of the most innovative and stylistically diverse musicians of the 20th century.

As a mostly self-taught composer and performer, Zappa had diverse musical influences that led him to create music that was sometimes difficult to categorize. While in his teens, he acquired a taste for 20th-century classical modernism, African-American rhythm and blues, and doo-wop music. He began writing classical music in high school, while simultaneously playing drums in rhythm-and-blues bands, later switching to electric guitar. His debut studio album with the Mothers of Invention, Freak Out! (1966), combined satirical but seemingly conventional rock-and-roll songs with extended sound collages. He continued this eclectic and experimental approach throughout his career.

Zappa's output is unified by a conceptual continuity he termed "Project/Object", with numerous musical phrases, ideas and characters reappearing throughout his albums. His lyrics reflected his iconoclastic views of established social and political processes, structures and movements, often humorously so, and he has been described as the "godfather" of comedy rock. He was a strident critic of mainstream education and organized religion, and a forthright and passionate advocate for freedom of speech, self-education, political participation and the abolition of censorship. Unlike many other rock musicians of his generation, he disapproved of recreational drug use, but supported decriminalization and regulation.

Zappa was a highly productive and prolific musician with a controversial critical standing; supporters of his music admired its compositional complexity, while detractors found it lacking emotional depth. He had greater commercial success outside the U.S., particularly in Europe. Though he worked as an independent artist, Zappa mostly relied on distribution agreements he had negotiated with the major record labels. He remains a major influence on musicians. His many honors include his posthumous 1995 induction into the Rock and Roll Hall of Fame and the 1997 Grammy Lifetime Achievement Award.

== 1940–1965: Early life and career ==
=== Childhood ===
Zappa was born on December 21, 1940, in Baltimore, Maryland, to Rose Marie (née Colimore) and Francis Vincent Zappa. His father was born in Partinico, Sicily. Zappa was predominantly of Sicilian descent, but also had Greek, Arbëreshë, and French ancestors. (Note: "My ancestry is Sicilian, Greek, Arbëreshë, and French. My mother's mother was French and Sicilian, and her Dad was Italian (from Naples). She was first-generation. The Greek-Arab side is from my Dad. He was born in a Sicilian village called Partinico ...") Frank was the second of five children, preceded by his half-sister Ann and followed by his brothers Bobby and Carl and sister Patrice (also known as Candy).

He was raised in an Italian-American household where Italian was often spoken by his grandparents. The family moved often because his father, a chemist and mathematician, worked in the defense industry. After a time in Florida in the 1940s, the family returned to Maryland, where Zappa's father worked at the Edgewood Arsenal chemical warfare facility—since incorporated into the adjacent Aberdeen Proving Ground—run by the U.S. Army. Due to their home's proximity to the arsenal, which stored mustard gas, gas masks were kept in the home in case of an accident. This living arrangement had a profound effect on Zappa, and references to germs, germ warfare, ailments and the defense industry occur frequently throughout his work.

Zappa's father often brought mercury-filled lab equipment home from his workplace and gave it to Zappa to play with. Zappa said that as a child he "used to play with it all the time", often by putting liquid mercury on the floor and using a hammer to spray out mercury droplets in a circular pattern, eventually covering the entire floor of his bedroom with them.

Zappa was often sick as a child, suffering from asthma, earaches and sinus problems. A doctor treated his sinusitis by inserting a pellet of radium into each of Zappa's nostrils. At the time, little was known about the potential dangers of even small amounts of therapeutic radiation and mercury exposure.

Nasal imagery and references appear in his music and lyrics, as well as in the collage album covers created by his long-time collaborator Cal Schenkel. Zappa believed his childhood diseases might have been due to exposure to mustard gas released by the nearby chemical warfare facility, and his health worsened when he lived in Baltimore. In 1952, his family relocated for health reasons to Monterey, California, where his father taught metallurgy at the Naval Postgraduate School. They soon moved to the San Diego neighborhood of Clairemont, and then to the nearby city of El Cajon, before finally returning to San Diego.

=== First musical interests ===
Since I didn't have any kind of formal training, it didn't make any difference to me if I was listening to Lightnin' Slim, or a vocal group called the Jewels ..., or Webern, or Varèse, or Stravinsky. To me it was all good music.

— Frank Zappa, 1989

At the age of 12, Zappa started learning drum rudiments at a summer school group course in Monterey, California with a teacher named Keith McKillop. Frank said "Instead of drums, he had us practicing on wooden planks." Zappa joined his first band at Mission Bay High School in San Diego as a drummer. At about the same time, his parents bought a phonograph, which allowed him to develop his interest in music, and to begin building his record collection. According to The Rough Guide to Rock (2003), "as a teenager Zappa was simultaneously enthralled by black R&B (Johnny 'Guitar' Watson, Guitar Slim), doo-wop (The Channels, The Velvets), and modern composers, such as Igor Stravinsky, Anton Webern and Edgard Varèse."

R&B singles were early purchases for Zappa, starting a large collection he kept for the rest of his life. He was interested in sounds for their own sake, particularly the sounds of drums and other percussion instruments. By age twelve, he had obtained a snare drum and began learning the basics of orchestral percussion. Zappa's deep interest in modern classical music began when he read a LOOK magazine article about the Sam Goody record store chain that lauded its ability to sell an LP as obscure as The Complete Works of Edgard Varèse, Volume One. The article described Varèse's percussion composition Ionisation, produced by EMS Recordings, as "a weird jumble of drums and other unpleasant sounds". Zappa decided to seek out Varèse's music. After searching for over a year, Zappa found a copy (he noticed the LP because of the "mad scientist" looking photo of Varèse on the cover). Not having enough money with him, he persuaded the salesman to sell him the record at a discount. Thus began his lifelong passion for Varèse's music and that of other modern classical composers. He also liked the Italian classical music listened to by his grandparents, especially Puccini's opera arias.

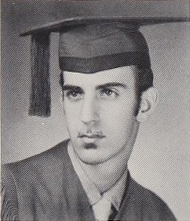
Zappa's senior yearbook photo, 1958

By 1956, the Zappa family had moved to Lancaster, a small aerospace and farming town in the Antelope Valley of the Mojave Desert close to Edwards Air Force Base. He would later refer to Sun Village (a town close to Lancaster) in the 1973 song "Village of the Sun". Zappa's mother encouraged him in his musical interests. Although she disliked Varèse's music, she was indulgent enough to give her son a long-distance call to the New York composer as a fifteenth birthday present. Unfortunately, Varèse was in Europe at the time, so Zappa spoke to the composer's wife and she suggested he call back later. In a letter, Varèse thanked him for his interest, and told him about a composition he was working on called "Déserts". Living in the desert town of Lancaster, Zappa found this very exciting. Varèse invited him to visit if he ever came to New York. The meeting never took place (Varèse died in 1965), but Zappa framed the letter and kept it on display for the rest of his life. (Note: On several of his earlier albums, Zappa paid tribute to Varèse by quoting his: "The present-day composer refuses to die.")

At Antelope Valley High School, Zappa met Don Glen Vliet (who later changed his name to Don Van Vliet and adopted the stage name Captain Beefheart). Zappa and Vliet became close friends, sharing an interest in R&B records and influencing each other musically throughout their careers. Around the same time, Zappa started playing drums in a local band, the Blackouts. The band was racially diverse and included Euclid James "Motorhead" Sherwood who later became a member of the Mothers of Invention. Zappa's interest in the guitar grew, and in 1957 he was given his first instrument. Among his early influences were Johnny "Guitar" Watson, Howlin' Wolf and Clarence "Gatemouth" Brown. In the 1970s and '80s, Zappa invited Watson to perform on several albums. Zappa considered guitar solos the equivalent of forming "air sculptures", and developed an eclectic, innovative and highly personal style. He was also influenced by Egyptian composer Halim El-Dabh, an early proponent of tape music.

Zappa's interest in composing and arranging flourished in his last high school years. By his final year, he was writing, arranging and conducting avant-garde performance pieces for the school orchestra. He graduated from Antelope Valley High School in 1958, and later acknowledged two of his music teachers on the sleeve of the 1966 album Freak Out! Due to his family's frequent moves, Zappa attended at least six different high schools, and as a student he was often bored and given to distracting the rest of the class with juvenile antics. In 1959, he attended Chaffey College but left after one semester, and maintained thereafter a disdain for formal education, taking his children out of school at age 15 and refusing to pay for their college. While in college, Zappa met Terry Kirkman and played gigs at local coffee houses with him.

Zappa left home in 1959, and moved into a small apartment in Echo Park, Los Angeles. After he met Kathryn J. "Kay" Sherman during his short period of private composition study with Prof. Karl Kohn of Pomona College, they moved in together in Ontario, California, and were married December 28, 1960. Zappa worked for a short period in advertising as a copywriter. His sojourn in the commercial world was brief, but gave him valuable insights into its workings. Throughout his career, he took a keen interest in the visual presentation of his work, designing some of his album covers and directing his own films and videos.

=== Studio Z ===
Zappa attempted to earn a living as a musician and composer, and played different nightclub gigs, some with a new version of the Blackouts. Zappa's earliest professional recordings, two soundtracks for the low-budget films The World's Greatest Sinner (1962) and Run Home, Slow (1965) were more financially rewarding. The former score was commissioned by actor-producer Timothy Carey and recorded in 1961. It contains many themes that appeared on later Zappa records. The latter soundtrack was recorded in 1963 after the film was completed, but it was commissioned by one of Zappa's former high school teachers in 1959 and Zappa may have worked on it before the film was shot. Excerpts from the soundtrack can be heard on the posthumous album The Lost Episodes (1996).

During the early 1960s, Zappa wrote and produced songs for other local artists, often working with singer-songwriter Ray Collins and producer Paul Buff. Their "Memories of El Monte" was recorded by the Penguins, although only Cleve Duncan of the original group was featured. Buff owned the small Pal Recording Studio in Cucamonga, which included a unique five-track tape recorder he had built. At that time, only a handful of the most sophisticated commercial studios had multi-track facilities; the industry standard for smaller studios was still mono or two-track. Although none of the recordings from the period achieved major commercial success, Zappa earned enough money to allow him in 1963 to stage a concert of his orchestral music and to broadcast and record it. In March of that same year Zappa appeared on Steve Allen's syndicated late night show playing a bicycle as a musical instrument— using drum sticks and a bow borrowed from the band's bass player he proceeded to pluck, bang, and bow the spokes of the bike, producing strange, comical sounds from his newfound instrument. With Captain Beefheart, Zappa recorded some songs under the name of the Soots. They were rejected by Dot Records. Later, in 1965, the Mothers were also rejected by Columbia Records for having "no commercial potential", a verdict Zappa subsequently quoted on the sleeve of Freak Out!. The Columbia Records demo tape was rediscovered by a collector in 1993 and quickly returned to the Zappa estate.

In 1964, after his marriage started to break up, he moved into the Pal studio and began routinely working 12 hours or more per day recording and experimenting with overdubbing and audio tape manipulation. This established a work pattern that endured for most of his life. Aided by his income from film composing, Zappa took over the studio from Paul Buff, who was now working with Art Laboe at Original Sound. It was renamed Studio Z. Studio Z was rarely booked for recordings by other musicians. Instead, friends moved in, notably James "Motorhead" Sherwood. Zappa started performing in local bars as a guitarist with a power trio, the Muthers, to support himself.

An article in the local press describing Zappa as "the Movie King of Cucamonga" prompted the local police to suspect that he was making pornographic films. In March 1965, Zappa was approached by a vice squad undercover officer, and accepted an offer of $100 (equivalent to $1,020 in 2025) to produce a suggestive audio tape for an alleged bachelor party. Zappa and a female friend recorded a faked erotic episode. When Zappa was about to hand over the tape, he was arrested, and the police stripped the studio of all recorded material. The press was tipped off beforehand, and next day's The Daily Report wrote that "Vice Squad investigators stilled the tape recorders of a free-swinging, a-go-go film and recording studio here Friday and arrested a self-styled movie producer". Zappa was charged with "conspiracy to commit pornography". This felony charge was reduced and he was sentenced to six months in jail on a misdemeanor, with all but ten days suspended. His brief imprisonment left a permanent mark, and was central to the formation of his anti-authoritarian stance. Zappa lost several recordings made at Studio Z in the process, as the police returned only 30 of 80 hours of tape seized. Eventually, he could no longer afford to pay the rent on the studio and was evicted. Zappa managed to recover some of his possessions before the studio was torn down in 1966.

== 1965–1970: The Mothers of Invention ==
=== Formation ===
By April 1965, Ray Collins, one of Zappa's friends during the early Studio Z days, was the singer of an R&B band called the Soul Giants, based in Pomona, California. That month, he asked Zappa to take over as guitarist in the Soul Giants, following a fight between Collins and the group's original guitarist. Zappa accepted, and soon assumed leadership and the role as co-lead singer (even though he never considered himself a singer, then or later). He convinced the other members that they should play his music to increase the chances of getting a record contract. The band – comprising Zappa, Collins, Roy Estrada, and Jimmy Carl Black – debuted at the Broadside Club and was renamed the Mothers since this gig took place on May 10, 1965 – Mother's Day. They increased their bookings after beginning an association with manager Herb Cohen, and gradually gained attention on the burgeoning Los Angeles underground music scene. Under Zappa's leadership, the Mothers' lineup would be ever-changing during their time together, with members including Collins, Estrada, Black, Elliot Ingber, brothers Bunk and Buzz Gardner, Don Preston, Billy Mundi, Jim Fielder, Jim "Motorhead" Sherwood, Ian Underwood, Art Tripp, and Lowell George.

=== Signing to Verve Records ===
In early 1966, the Mothers were spotted by leading record producer Tom Wilson when playing "Trouble Every Day", a song about the Watts riots. Wilson had earned acclaim as the producer for Bob Dylan and Simon & Garfunkel, and was one of the few African-Americans working as a major label pop music producer at this time. Wilson signed the Mothers to the Verve division of MGM, which had built up a strong reputation for its releases of modern jazz recordings in the 1940s and 1950s, but was attempting to diversify into pop and rock audiences. Verve insisted that the band change their name, as Mother was short for motherfucker—a term that, apart from its profane meanings, can denote a skilled musician. As a compromise, Zappa expanded the band's name to "The Mothers of Invention".

With Wilson credited as producer, the Mothers of Invention, augmented by a studio orchestra, recorded the groundbreaking Freak Out! (1966), which, after Bob Dylan's Blonde on Blonde, was the second rock double album ever released. It mixed R&B, doo-wop, musique concrète, and experimental sound collages that captured the Los Angeles freak scene. Although he was dissatisfied with the final product, Freak Out immediately established Zappa as a radical new voice in rock music, providing an antidote to the "relentless consumer culture of America". The sound was raw, but the arrangements were sophisticated. While recording in the studio, some of the additional session musicians were shocked that they were expected to read the notes on sheet music from charts with Zappa conducting them, since it was not standard when recording rock music. The lyrics praised non-conformity, disparaged authorities, and had dadaist elements. Yet, there was a place for seemingly conventional love songs. Most compositions are Zappa's, which set a precedent for the rest of his recording career. He had full control over the arrangements and musical decisions and did most overdubs. Wilson provided the industry clout and connections and was able to provide the group with the financial resources needed. Although Wilson was able to provide Zappa and the Mothers with an extraordinary degree of artistic freedom for the time, the recording did not go entirely as planned. In a 1967 radio interview, Zappa explained that the album's outlandish 11-minute closing track, "Return of the Son of Monster Magnet" was not finished. The track as it appears on the album was only a backing track for a much more complex piece, but MGM refused to allow the additional recording time needed for completion. Much to Zappa's chagrin, it was issued in its unfinished state.

"Hungry Freaks Daddy" (1966)
The opening track on Freak Out!. The album has "consistently been voted as one of top 100 greatest albums ever made".

During the recording of Freak Out!, Zappa moved into a house in Laurel Canyon with friend Pamela Zarubica, who appeared on the album. The house became a meeting (and living) place for many LA musicians and groupies of the time, despite Zappa's disapproval of their illicit drug use. After a short promotional tour following the release of Freak Out!, Zappa met Adelaide Gail Sloatman. He fell in love within "a couple of minutes", and she moved into the house over the summer. They married in 1967, had four children and remained together until Zappa's death.

Wilson nominally produced the Mothers' second album Absolutely Free (1967), which was recorded in November 1966, and later mixed in New York, although by this time Zappa was in de facto control of most facets of the production. It featured extended playing by the Mothers of Invention and focused on songs that defined Zappa's compositional style of introducing abrupt rhythm changes into songs that were built from diverse elements. Examples are "Plastic People" and "Brown Shoes Don't Make It", which contained lyrics that lampooned the hypocrisy and conformity of American society, but also of the counterculture of the 1960s. As Zappa put it, "[W]e're satirists, and we are out to satirize everything." At this time, Zappa had also recorded material for an album of orchestral works to be released under his own name, Lumpy Gravy, to be released by Capitol Records in 1967. Due to contractual problems, the album was held back. Zappa took the opportunity to radically restructure the material, adding newly recorded improvised dialogue. After the contractual problems were resolved, a new album of the same name was issued by Verve in 1968. It is an "incredible ambitious musical project", a "monument to John Cage", which intertwines orchestral themes, spoken words and electronic noises through radical audio editing techniques. (Note: The initial orchestra-only recordings were released posthumously on the box set Lumpy Money (2009). See Dolan, Casey (December 8, 2008). "The Resurrection of Frank Zappa's Soul". LA Weekly. Archived from the original on October 4, 2012.)

=== Move to New York and beginning of Straight and Bizarre Records ===
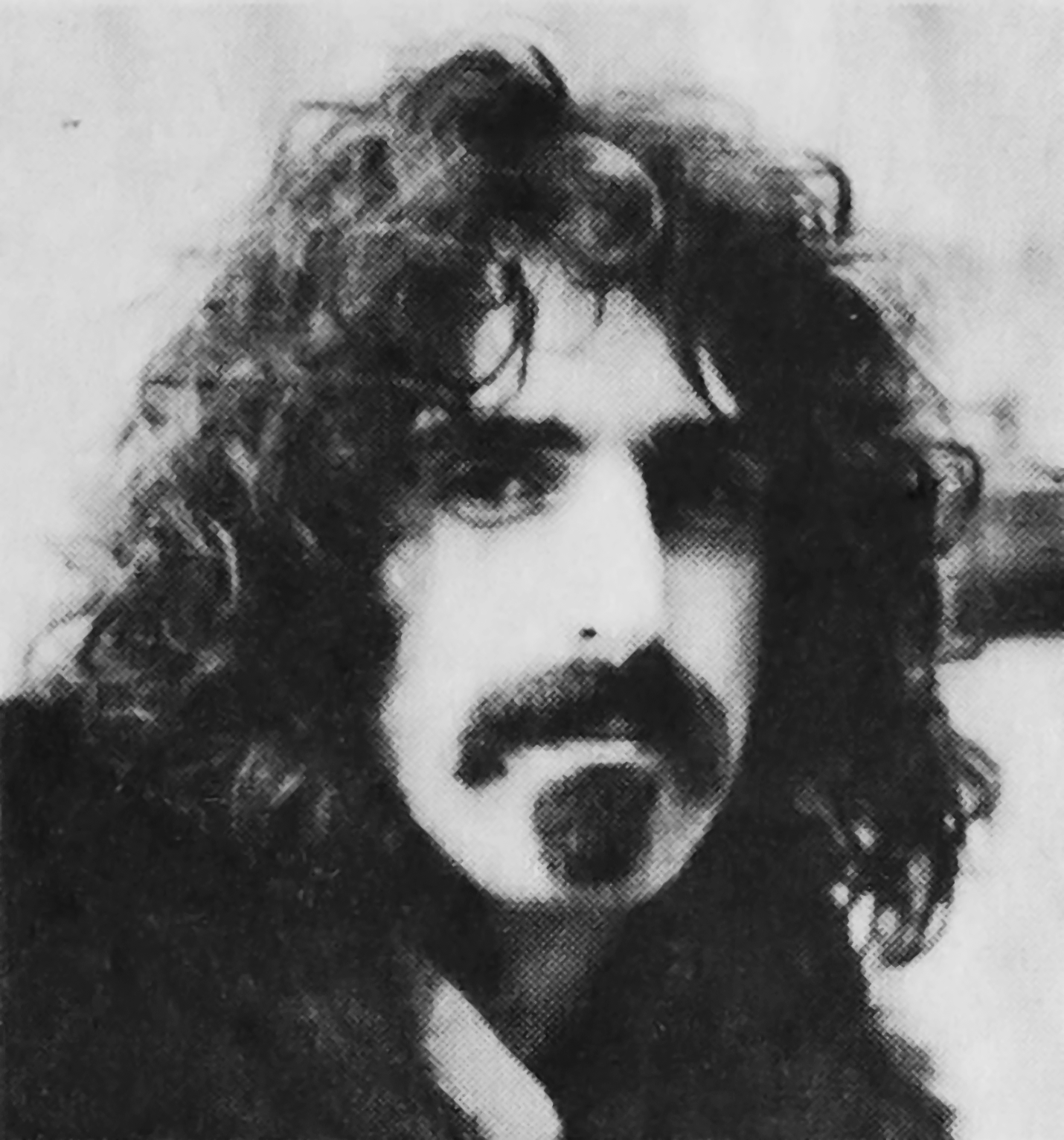
Zappa in 1967

The Mothers of Invention played in New York in late 1966 and were offered a contract at the Garrick Theater (at 152 Bleecker Street, above the Cafe au Go Go) during Easter 1967. This proved successful and Herb Cohen extended the booking, which eventually lasted half a year. As a result, Zappa and his wife Gail, along with the Mothers of Invention, moved to New York. Their shows became a combination of improvised acts showcasing individual talents of the band as well as tight performances of Zappa's music. Everything was directed by Zappa using hand signals. Guest performers and audience participation became a regular part of the Garrick Theater shows. One evening, Zappa managed to entice some U.S. Marines from the audience onto the stage, where they proceeded to dismember a big baby doll, having been told by Zappa to pretend that it was a "gook baby".

In 1967, filmmaker Ed Seeman paid Zappa $2,000 to produce music for a Luden's cough drops television commercial. Zappa's music was matched with Seeman's animation and the advertisement won a Clio Award for "Best Use of Sound". An alternate version of the soundtrack, called "The Big Squeeze", later appeared on Zappa's posthumous 1996 album The Lost Episodes. This version lacks Seeman's narration.

While living in New York City, and interrupted by the band's first European tour, the Mothers of Invention recorded the album widely regarded as the peak of the group's late 1960s work, We're Only in It for the Money (released 1968). It was produced by Zappa, with Wilson credited as executive producer. From then on, Zappa produced all albums released by the Mothers of Invention and as a solo artist. We're Only in It for the Money featured some of the most creative audio editing and production yet heard in pop music, and the songs ruthlessly satirized the hippie and flower power phenomena. He sampled surf music from his Studio Z days in the audio collage Nasal Retentive Caliope Music. The cover photo parodied that of the Beatles' Sgt. Pepper's Lonely Hearts Club Band. (Note: As the legal aspects of using the Sgt. Pepper concept were unsettled, the album was released with the cover and back on the inside of the gatefold, while the actual cover and back were a picture of the group in a pose parodying the inside of the Beatles album.) The cover art was provided by Cal Schenkel whom Zappa met in New York. This initiated a lifelong collaboration in which Schenkel designed covers for numerous Zappa and Mothers albums.

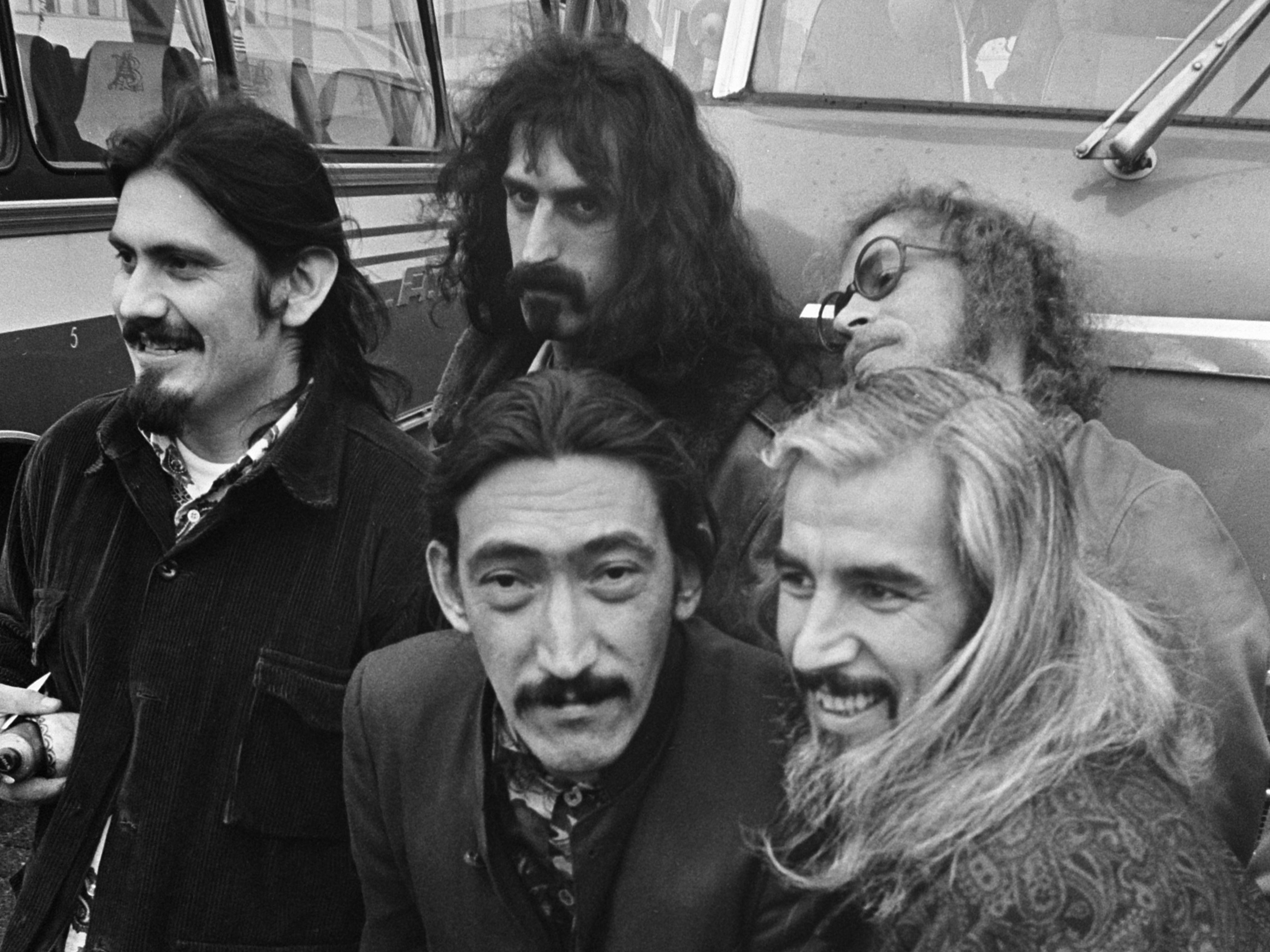
Zappa (back) with the Mothers, 1968

Reflecting Zappa's eclectic approach to music, the next album, Cruising with Ruben & the Jets (1968), was very different. It represented a collection of doo-wop songs; listeners and critics were not sure whether the album was a satire or a tribute. Zappa later remarked that the album was conceived like Stravinsky's compositions in his neo-classical period: "If he could take the forms and clichés of the classical era and pervert them, why not do the same ... to doo-wop in the fifties?" The opening theme from Stravinsky's The Rite of Spring is sung in "Fountain of Love".

In 1967 and 1968, Zappa made two appearances with the Monkees. The first appearance was on an episode of their TV series, "The Monkees Blow Their Minds", where Zappa, dressed up as Mike Nesmith, interviews Nesmith who is dressed up as Zappa. After the interview, Zappa destroys a car with a sledgehammer as the song "Mother People" plays. He later provided a cameo in the Monkees' movie Head where, leading a cow, he tells Davy Jones "the youth of America depends on you to show them the way." Zappa respected the Monkees and attempted to recruit Micky Dolenz to the Mothers but RCA/Columbia/Colgems would not release Dolenz from his contract.

During the late 1960s, Zappa continued to develop the business side of his career. He and Herb Cohen formed the Bizarre and Straight labels to increase creative control and produce recordings by other artists. These labels were distributed in the US by Warner Bros. Records. Zappa/Mothers recordings appeared on Bizarre along with Wild Man Fischer and Lenny Bruce. Straight released the double album Trout Mask Replica for Captain Beefheart, and releases by Alice Cooper, The Persuasions, and the GTOs. The Mothers' first album on Bizarre was 1969's Uncle Meat, which Zappa described as "most of the music from the Mothers' movie of the same name which we haven't got enough money to finish yet". A version of the Uncle Meat film was released direct-to-video in 1987. Principal photography having never been completed, the VHS videocassette is a "making of" documentary showing rehearsals and background footage from 1968 and interviews with people involved with the uncompleted production.

During the Mothers' second European tour in September/October 1968, they performed at the Internationale Essener Songtage at the Grugahalle in Essen, Germany; at the Tivoli in Copenhagen, Denmark; for TV programs in Germany (Beat-Club), France, and England; at the Concertgebouw in Amsterdam; at the Royal Festival Hall in London; and at the Olympia in Paris.

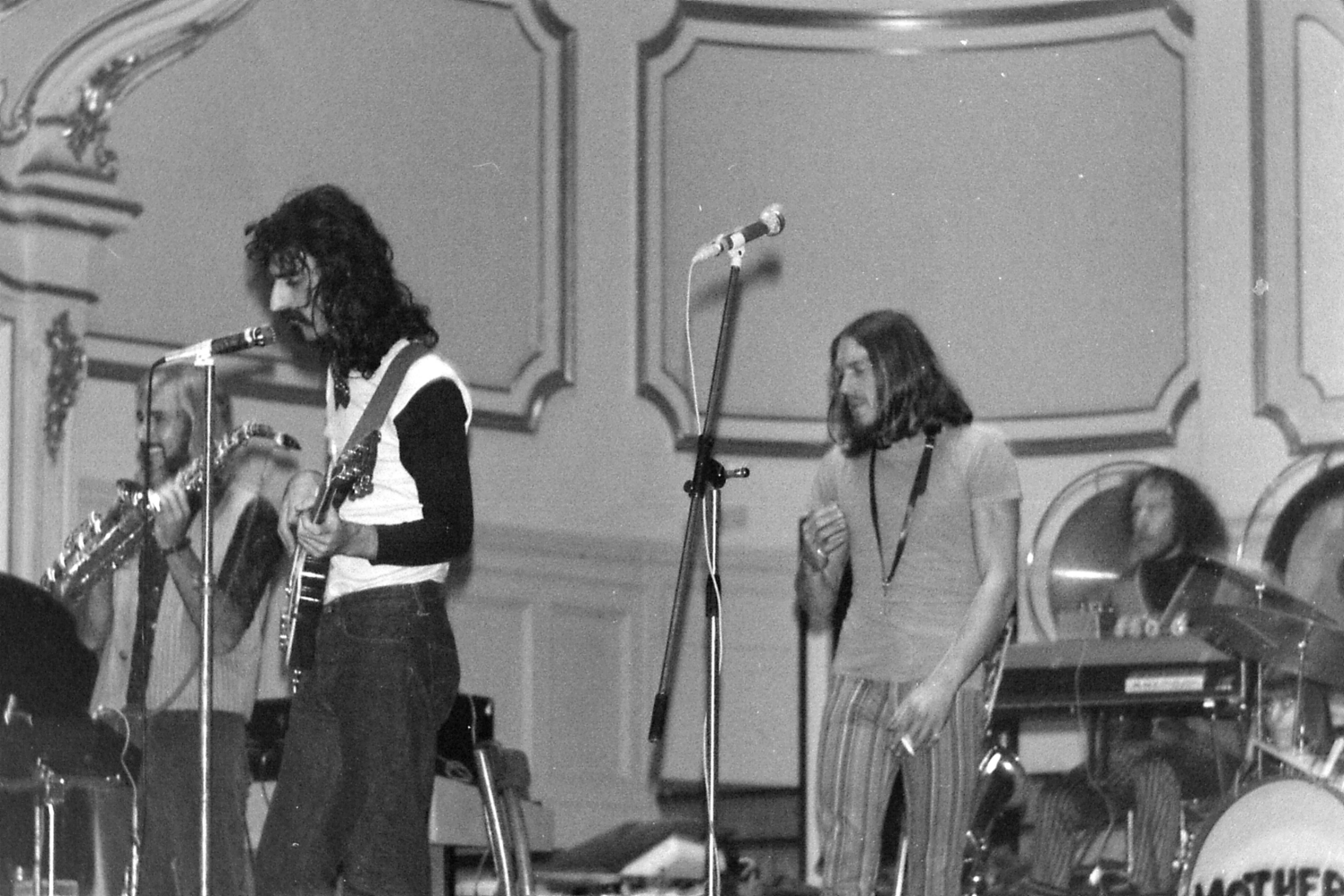
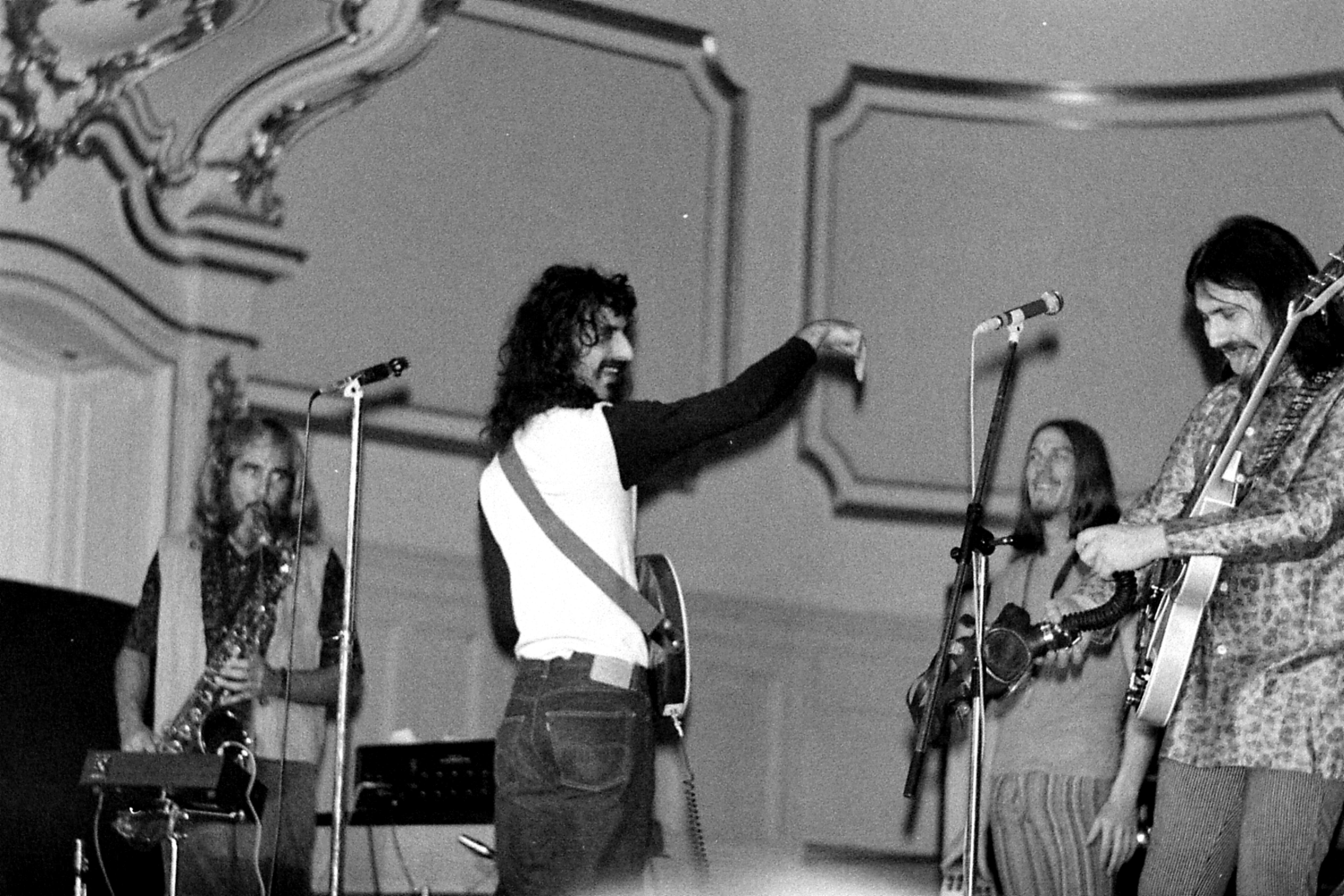
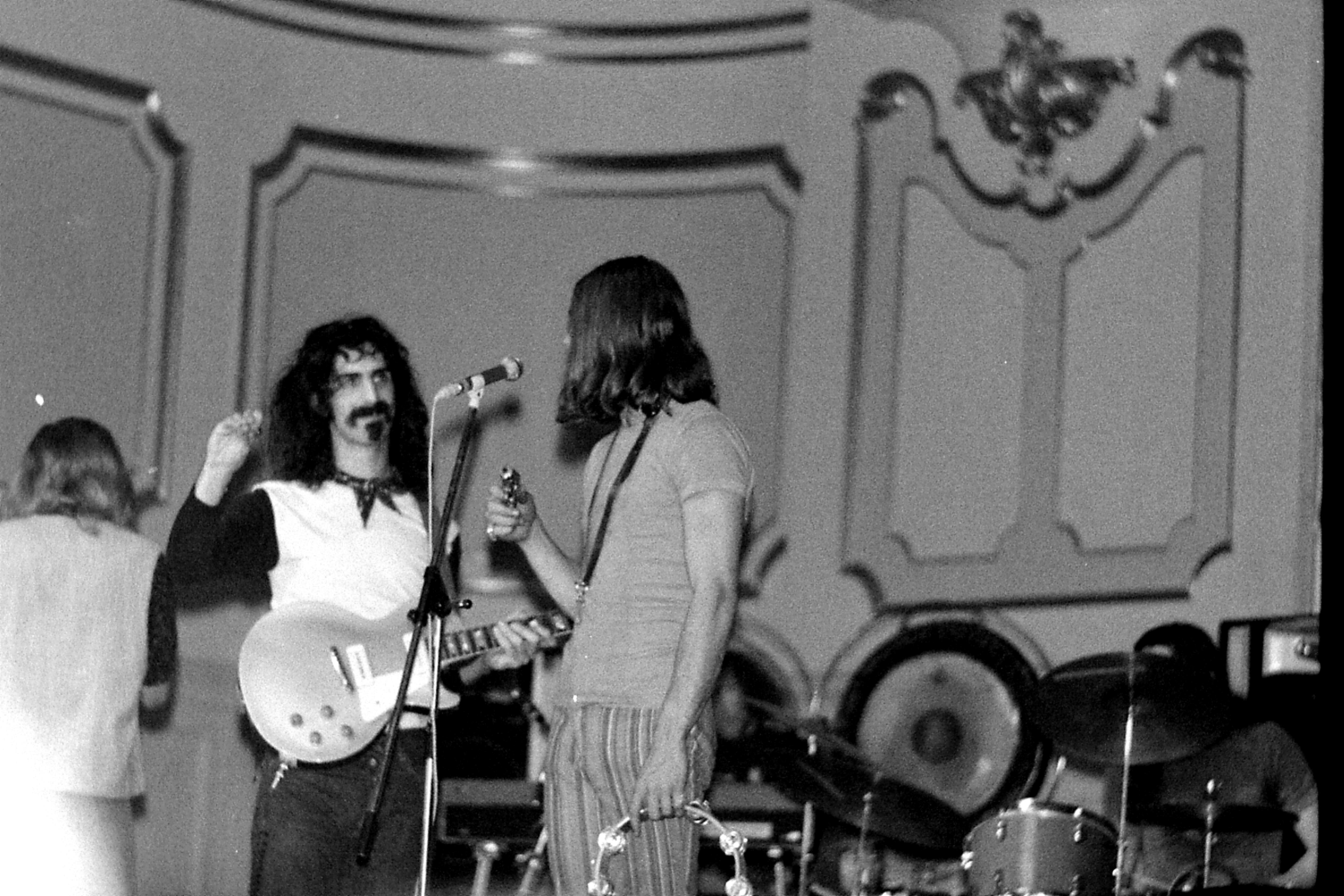
Zappa and the Mothers on stage in Hamburg, October 1968

=== Return to California and breakup ===
"Peaches En Regalia" (1969)
The opening track on Hot Rats is considered one of Zappa's most enduring compositions.

Zappa and the Mothers of Invention returned to Los Angeles in mid-1968; the Zappas moved into a house on Laurel Canyon Boulevard, only to move again to Woodrow Wilson Drive. This was Zappa's home for the rest of his life. Despite being successful in Europe, the Mothers of Invention were not doing well financially. Their first records were vocally oriented, but as Zappa wrote more instrumental jazz and classical style music for the band's concerts, audiences were confused. Zappa felt that audiences failed to appreciate his "electrical chamber music".

In 1969, there were nine band members and Zappa was supporting the group from his publishing royalties whether they played or not. In late 1969, Zappa broke up the band. He often cited the financial strain as the main reason, but also commented on the band members' lack of diligence. Many band members were bitter about Zappa's decision, and some took it as a sign of Zappa's perfectionism at the expense of human feeling. Others were irritated by 'his autocratic ways', exemplified by Zappa's never staying at the same hotel as the band members. Several members would play with Zappa again in subsequent years, while Lowell George and Roy Estrada went on to form the band Little Feat. Zappa assembled remaining unreleased recordings of the band on the albums Burnt Weeny Sandwich and Weasels Ripped My Flesh, both released in 1970.

After he disbanded the Mothers of Invention, Zappa released the acclaimed solo album Hot Rats (1969). It features, for the first time on record, Zappa playing extended guitar solos and contains one of his most enduring compositions, "Peaches en Regalia", which reappeared several times on future recordings. He was backed by jazz, blues and R&B session players including violinist Don "Sugarcane" Harris, drummers John Guerin and Paul Humphrey, multi-instrumentalist and former Mothers of Invention member Ian Underwood, and multi-instrumentalist Shuggie Otis on bass, along with a guest appearance by Captain Beefheart on the only vocal track, "Willie the Pimp". It became a popular album in England, and had a major influence on the development of jazz-rock fusion.

== 1970–1980: Highs and lows ==
=== Rebirth of the Mothers and filmmaking ===
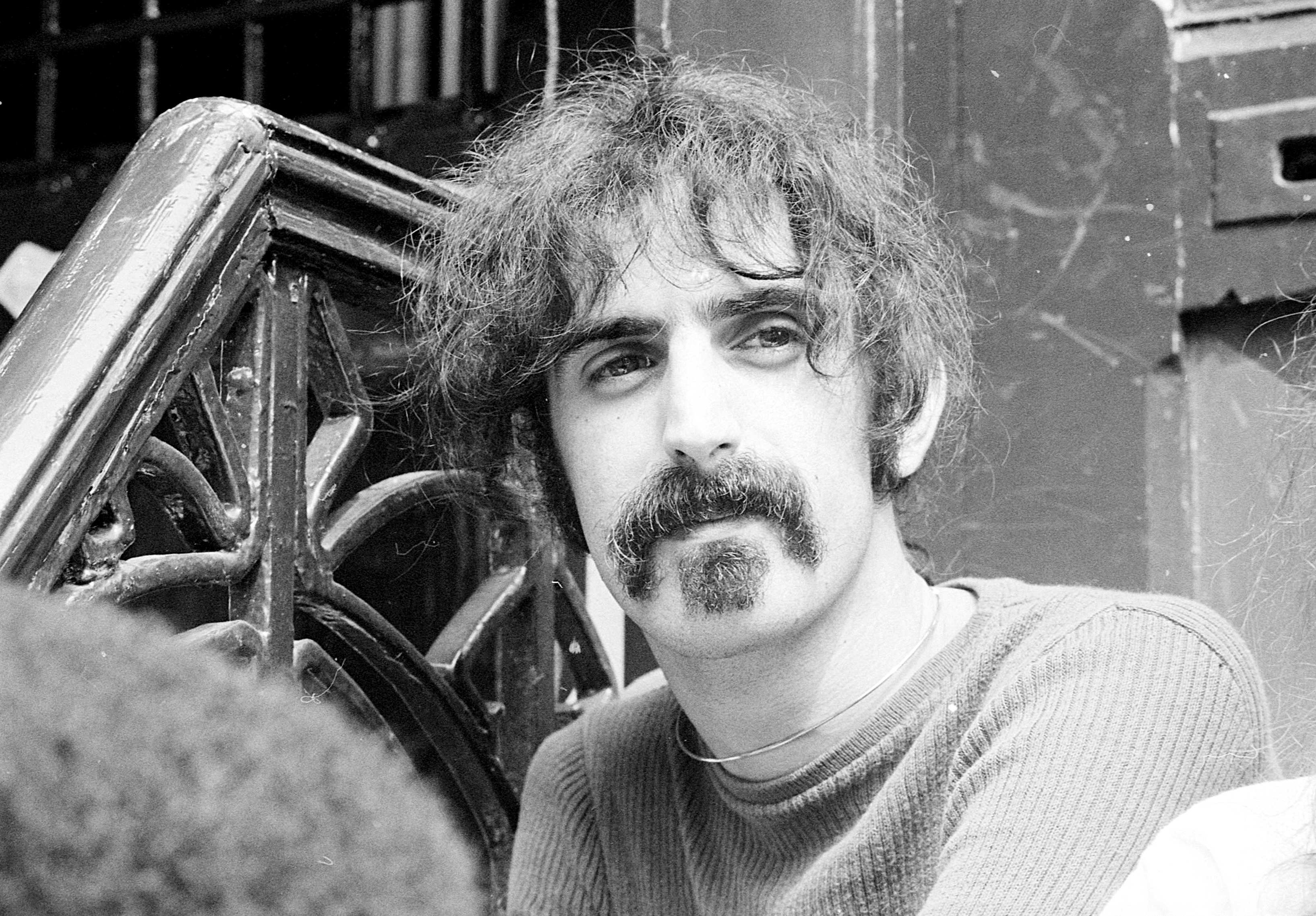
Zappa in 1970

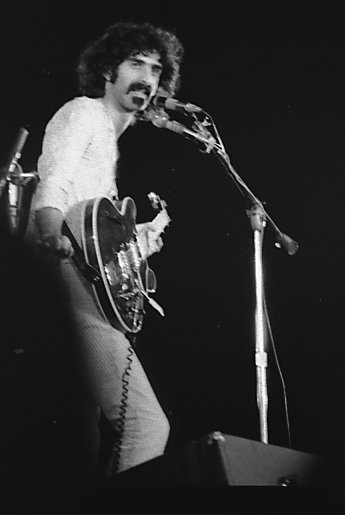
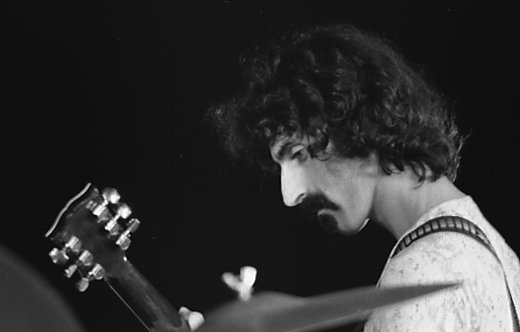
Zappa on stage at the Theatre de Clichy, Paris, 1971

In 1970, Zappa met conductor Zubin Mehta. They arranged a May 1970 concert where Mehta conducted the Los Angeles Philharmonic augmented by a rock band. According to Zappa, the music was mostly written in motel rooms while on tour with the Mothers of Invention. Some of it was later featured in the movie 200 Motels. Although the concert was a success, Zappa's experience working with a symphony orchestra was not a happy one. His dissatisfaction became a recurring theme throughout his career; he often felt that the quality of performance of his material delivered by orchestras was not commensurate with the money he spent on orchestral concerts and recordings.

Later in 1970, Zappa formed a new version of the Mothers (from then on, he mostly dropped the "of Invention"). Along with Ian Underwood, the new band also included British drummer Aynsley Dunbar, jazz keyboardist George Duke, bassist Jeff Simmons, and the two lead singers of the Turtles, Mark Volman and Howard Kaylan, who, due to persistent legal and contractual problems, adopted the stage name "The Phlorescent Leech and Eddie" or "Flo & Eddie" for short. Another member of the Turtles, Jim Pons, would join on bass in February 1971, following Simmons' departure the previous month and his brief replacement by Martin Lickert.

This version of the Mothers debuted on Zappa's next solo album Chunga's Revenge (1970), which was followed by the double-album soundtrack to the movie 200 Motels (1971), featuring the Mothers, the Royal Philharmonic Orchestra, Ringo Starr, Theodore Bikel, and Keith Moon. Co-directed by Zappa and Tony Palmer, it was filmed in a week at Pinewood Studios outside London. Tensions between Zappa and several cast and crew members arose before and during shooting. The film deals loosely with life on the road as a rock musician. It was the first feature film photographed on videotape and transferred to 35 mm film, a process that allowed for novel visual effects. It was released to mixed reviews. The score relied extensively on orchestral music, and Zappa's dissatisfaction with the classical music world intensified when a concert, scheduled at the Royal Albert Hall after filming, was canceled because a representative of the venue found some of the lyrics obscene. In 1975, he lost a lawsuit against the Royal Albert Hall for breach of contract.

After 200 Motels, the band went on tour, which resulted in two live albums, Fillmore East – June 1971 and Just Another Band from L.A.; the latter included the 20-minute track "Billy the Mountain", Zappa's satire on rock opera set in Southern California. This track was representative of the band's theatrical performances—which used songs to build sketches based on 200 Motels scenes, as well as new situations that often portrayed the band members' sexual encounters on the road. (Note: During the June 1971 Fillmore concerts Zappa was joined on stage by John Lennon and Yoko Ono. This performance was recorded, and Lennon released excerpts on his album Some Time in New York City in 1972. Zappa later released his version of excerpts from the concert on Playground Psychotics in 1992, including the jam track "Scumbag" and an extended avant-garde vocal piece by Ono (originally called "Au"), which Zappa renamed "A Small Eternity with Yoko Ono".)

=== Accident, attack, and aftermath ===
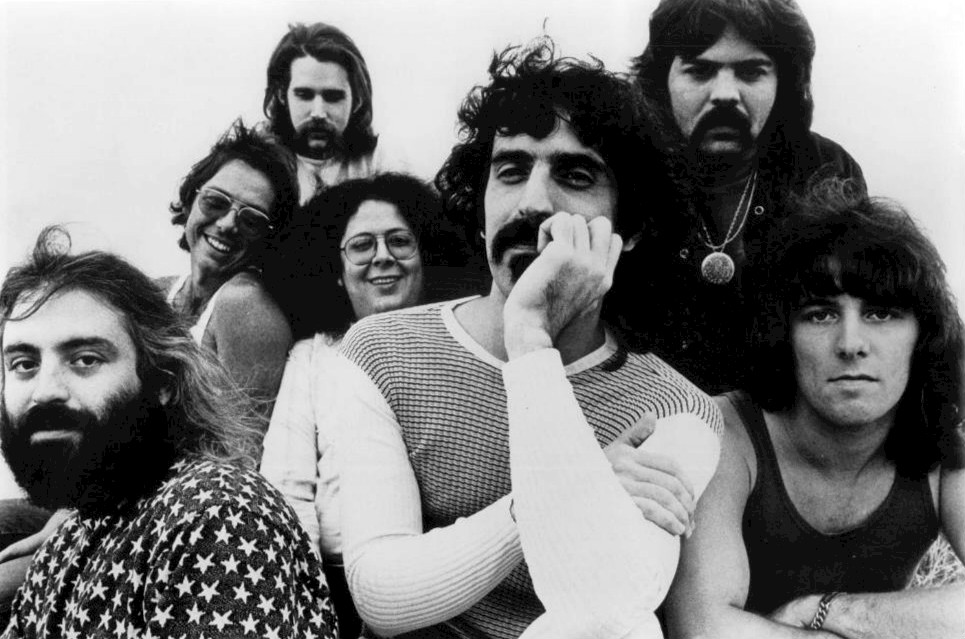
Zappa with the Mothers, 1971

On December 4, 1971, Zappa suffered his first of two serious setbacks. While performing at Casino de Montreux in Switzerland, the Mothers' equipment was destroyed when a flare set off by an audience member started a fire that burned down the casino. Deep Purple were booked to record in the casino after Zappa's performance, and wrote about the incident in their 1972 song "Smoke on the Water". A recording of the incident and immediate aftermath can be heard on the bootleg album Swiss Cheese/Fire, released legally as part of Zappa's Beat the Boots II box set. After losing $50,000 (equivalent to $397,000 in 2025) worth of equipment and a week's break, the Mothers played at the Rainbow Theatre, London, with rented gear. During the encore, an audience member, jealous because of his girlfriend's infatuation with Zappa, pushed him off the stage and into the concrete-floored orchestra pit. The band thought Zappa had been killed—he had suffered serious fractures, head trauma and injuries to his back, leg, and neck, as well as a crushed larynx, which ultimately caused his voice to drop a third after healing. A recording of the whole concert, including the attack, was released on the posthumous album The Mothers 1971 in 2022.

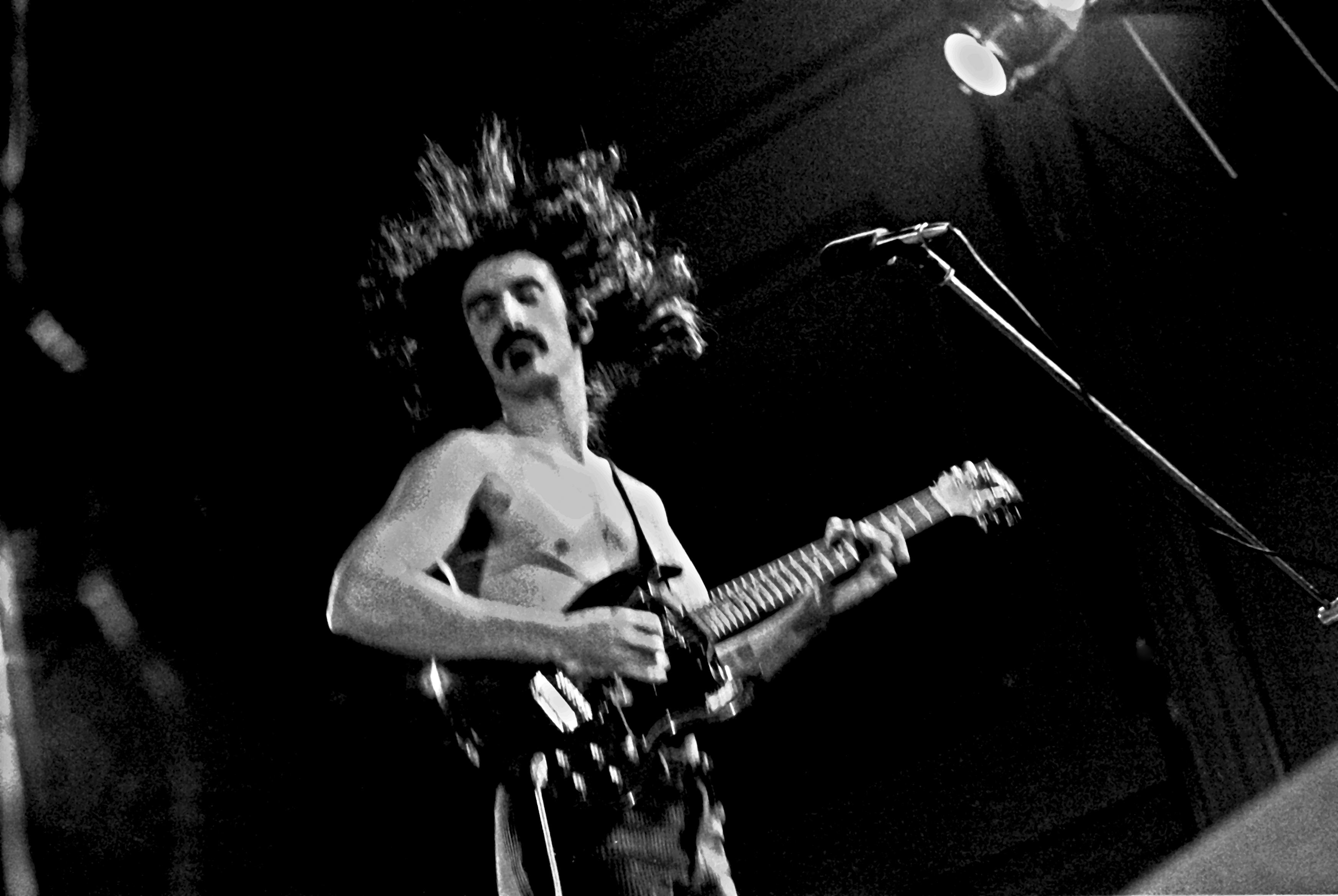
Zappa on Stage in Hamburg, December 1971

After the attack, Zappa needed to use a wheelchair for an extended period; this made touring impossible for over half a year. Upon return to the stage in September 1972, Zappa was still wearing a leg brace, had a noticeable limp and could not stand for very long while on stage. Zappa noted that one leg healed "shorter than the other" (a reference later found in the lyrics of songs "Zomby Woof" and "Dancin' Fool"), resulting in chronic back pain. Meanwhile, the Mothers were left in limbo and eventually formed the core of Flo and Eddie's band as they set out on their own.

=== Waka/Jawaka and The Grand Wazoo ===
"Waka/Jawaka" (1972)
The closing track on Waka/Jawaka, one of Zappa's jazz-oriented albums.

In 1972, Zappa released two strongly jazz-oriented solo LPs, Waka/Jawaka and The Grand Wazoo, which were recorded during the forced layoff from concert touring, using floating lineups of session players and Mothers alumni. Musically, the albums were akin to Hot Rats, in that they featured extended instrumental tracks with extended soloing. Zappa began touring again in late 1972. His first effort was a series of concerts in September 1972 with a 20-piece big band referred to as the Grand Wazoo. This was followed by a scaled-down version known as the Petit Wazoo that toured the U.S. for five weeks from October to December 1972.

In December 1972, David Walley published the first biography of Zappa, titled No Commercial Potential. Zappa was severely critical, calling it "a quickie, paperback, sensational book". He said that it contained "gross inaccuracies", described the writing as "not quality workmanship" and claimed that Walley had "just slung together a bunch of quotes". Despite Zappa's complaints, the book was later published in an updated edition in 1980 and again in 1996 after Zappa's death.

=== Beginning of DiscReet Records and commercial peak ===
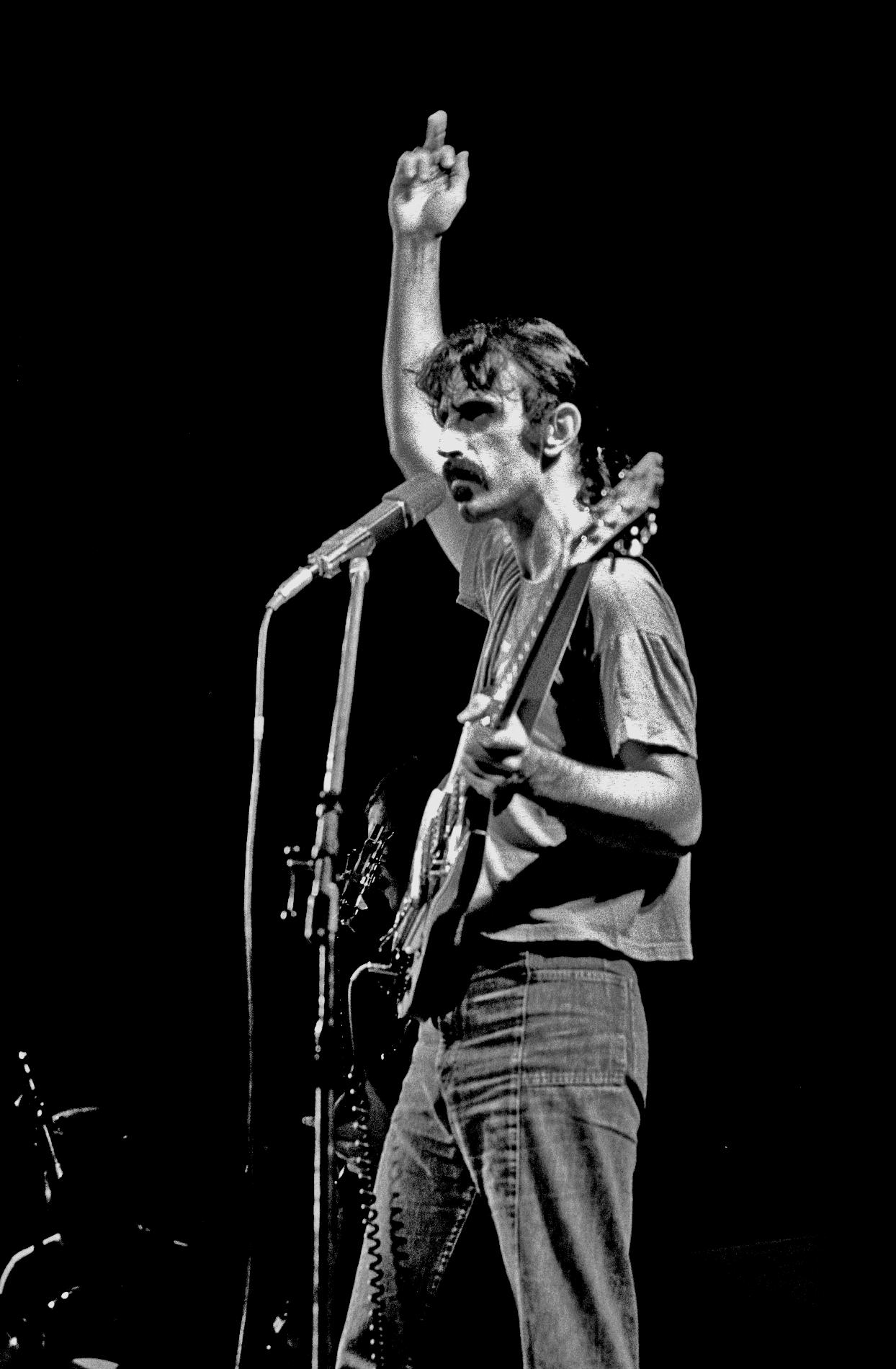
Zappa giving the finger during a show in Hamburg, September 1974

Zappa then formed and toured with smaller groups that variously included Ian Underwood (reeds, keyboards), Ruth Underwood (vibes, marimba), Sal Marquez (trumpet, vocals), Napoleon Murphy Brock (sax, flute and vocals), Bruce Fowler (trombone), Tom Fowler (bass), Chester Thompson (drums), Ralph Humphrey (drums), George Duke (keyboards, vocals), and Jean-Luc Ponty (violin).

By 1973, the Bizarre and Straight labels were discontinued. Zappa and Cohen then created DiscReet, also distributed by Warner. Zappa continued a high rate of production through the first half of the 1970s, including the album Apostrophe (') (1974), which reached a career-high No. 10 on the Billboard pop album charts helped by the No. 86 chart hit "Don't Eat The Yellow Snow". Other albums from the period are Over-Nite Sensation (1973), which contained several future concert favourites such as "Dinah-Moe Humm" and "Montana", as well as Roxy & Elsewhere (1974) and One Size Fits All (1975), which are notable for the tight renditions of highly difficult jazz fusion songs in such pieces as "Inca Roads", "Echidna's Arf (Of You)" and "Be-Bop Tango (Of the Old Jazzmen's Church)". A live recording from 1974, You Can't Do That on Stage Anymore, Vol. 2 (1988), captures "the full spirit and excellence of the 1973–1975 band".

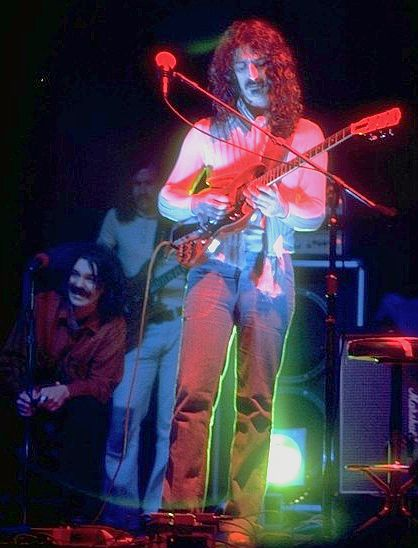
Zappa with Captain Beefheart, seated left, during a 1975 concert in New Haven, Connecticut

In April 1975 Zappa complained about ongoing contractual problems between DiscReet and Warner. He released Bongo Fury (1975), which featured a live recording at the Armadillo World Headquarters in Austin from a tour the same year that reunited him with Captain Beefheart for a brief period. They later became estranged for a period of years, but were in contact at the end of Zappa's life.

=== Business breakups and continued touring ===
In 1976, Zappa produced the album Good Singin', Good Playin' for Grand Funk Railroad. His relationship with long-time manager Herb Cohen ended in May 1976. After Cohen cashed one of Zappa's royalty checks from Warner and kept the money for himself, Zappa sued him. Zappa was also upset with Cohen for signing acts he did not approve. Cohen filed a lawsuit against Zappa in return, which froze the money the pair were expecting to receive from an out-of-court settlement with MGM/Verve over the rights to Zappa's early Mothers of Invention recordings. The MGM settlement was finalized in mid-1977 after two years of negotiations. Litigation with Cohen also prevented Zappa having access to any of his previously recorded material during the trials. Zappa therefore took his personal master copies of the album Zoot Allures (1976) directly to Warner, while bypassing DiscReet. Cohen countersued, claiming that the Warner release violated the terms of his DiscReet contract with Zappa. So the final four albums of Zappa's recording contract were then assigned back to DiscReet, against Zappa's objection. Following the split with Cohen, Zappa hired Bennett Glotzer as new manager.

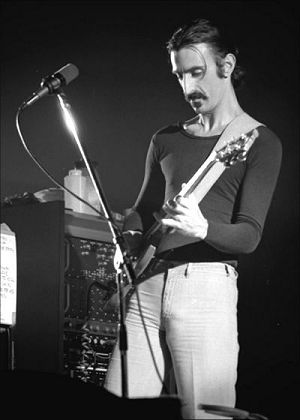
Zappa performing in Oslo, January 1977

By late 1976, Zappa was upset with Warner over inadequate promotion of his DiscReet recordings and he was eager to move on as soon as possible. In March 1977, Zappa delivered four albums (five full-length LPs) to Warner to complete his contract: Zappa in New York (a 2-LP set), Studio Tan, Sleep Dirt and Orchestral Favorites. These albums contained recordings mostly made between 1972 and 1976. Warner failed to pay Zappa on delivery of the four albums and to meet other contractual obligations. In response Zappa filed a multi-million dollar breach of contract lawsuit. During a lengthy legal debate, Warner eventually released the four disputed albums during 1978 and 1979, Zappa in New York having been censored to remove references to guitarist Punky Meadows. Following his completion of the Warner contract, Zappa reconfigured the four disputed albums, along with some other material, into a quadruple album called Läther (pronounced "leather") and negotiated distribution with Phonogram Inc. for release on the new Zappa Records label. Läther was scheduled for release on Halloween 1977, but legal action from Warner forced Zappa to shelve this project.

In December 1977, Zappa appeared on the Pasadena, California radio station KROQ-FM and played the entire Läther album, while encouraging listeners to make tape recordings of the broadcast. The album integrates many aspects of Zappa's 1970s work: heavy rock, orchestral works, and complex jazz instrumentals, along with Zappa's distinctive guitar solos. Läther was officially released posthumously in 1996. It has been debated as to whether Zappa had conceived the material as a four-LP set from the beginning, or only later when working with Phonogram. (Note: When the music was first released on CD in 1991, Zappa chose to re-release the four individual albums. In the liner notes to the 1996 release, Gail Zappa states that "As originally conceived by Frank, Läther was always a 4-record box set.") Gail Zappa claimed in 1996 that Läther was Zappa's original intention. However, Zappa himself stated in an October 1978 radio interview that "Läther was made out of four albums. Warners has released two of them already and they have two more that they're probably gonna release."

Although Zappa eventually gained the rights to all his material created under the MGM and Warner contracts, the various lawsuits meant that for a period Zappa's only income came from touring, which he therefore did extensively in 1975–1977 with relatively small, mainly rock-oriented, bands. Drummer Terry Bozzio became a regular band member, Napoleon Murphy Brock stayed on for a while, and original Mothers of Invention bassist Roy Estrada joined. Among other musicians were bassist Patrick O'Hearn, singer-guitarist Ray White and former Roxy Music keyboardist/violinist Eddie Jobson. In December 1976, Zappa appeared as a featured musical guest on the NBC television show Saturday Night Live. Zappa's song "I'm the Slime" was performed with a voice-over by SNL booth announcer Don Pardo, who also introduced "Peaches En Regalia" on the same airing. In 1978, Zappa served both as host and musical act on the show. The performances included an impromptu musical collaboration with cast member John Belushi during the instrumental piece "The Purple Lagoon". Belushi appeared as his Samurai Futaba character playing the tenor sax with Zappa conducting. However, he earned a ban from the show after the latter episode because he had done what producers called "a disastrous job of hosting" (Zappa reportedly did not get along with cast and crew in the lead-up to recording, then told the audience he was simply reading from cue cards).

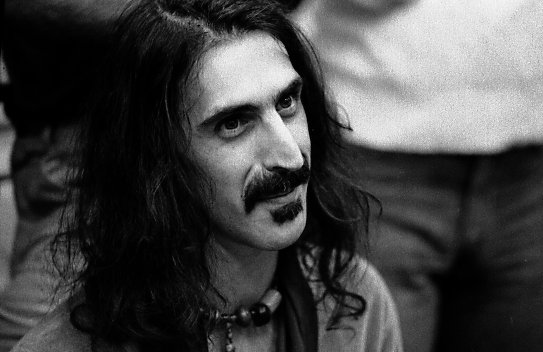
Zappa in Toronto, 1977

Zappa's band had a series of Christmas shows in New York City in 1976, recordings of which appear on Zappa in New York and Läther. The band included Ruth Underwood and a horn section featuring the Brecker Brothers. It mixes complex instrumentals such as "The Black Page" and humorous songs like "Titties and Beer". The former composition, written originally for drum kit but later developed for larger bands, is notorious for its complexity in rhythmic structure and short, densely arranged passages.

"The Black Page Drum Solo/Black Page #1" (recorded 1976, released 1978)
One of Zappa's complex, percussion-based compositions featured on Zappa in New York.

Zappa in New York also featured a song about sex criminal Michael H. Kenyon, "The Illinois Enema Bandit", in which Don Pardo provides the opening narrative. Like many songs on the album, it contained numerous sexual references, leading to many critics objecting and being offended by the content. Zappa dismissed the criticism by noting that he was acting as a "journalist" reporting on life as he saw it. Predating his later fight against censorship, he remarked: "What do you make of a society that is so primitive that it clings to the belief that certain words in its language are so powerful that they could corrupt you the moment you hear them?" The remaining albums released by Warner without Zappa's approval were Studio Tan in 1978 and Sleep Dirt and Orchestral Favorites in 1979. These releases were not promoted and were largely overlooked in the midst of the press about Zappa's legal problems. The 1991 CD releases of these albums marked the first time they were issued with Zappa's full approval.

=== Zappa Records ===
"Bobby Brown" (1979)
The single became a hit in non-English speaking countries and helped Sheik Yerbouti become a best-seller.

Zappa released two of his most important projects in 1979. The double LP Sheik Yerbouti appeared in March and was the first release on Zappa Records. It became the best-selling album of his career. The album contained the Grammy-nominated single "Dancin' Fool", which reached No. 45 on the Billboard charts. It also contained "Jewish Princess", which received attention when the Anti-Defamation League (ADL) attempted to prevent the song from receiving radio airplay due to its alleged antisemitic lyrics. Zappa vehemently denied any antisemitic sentiments, and dismissed the ADL as a "noisemaking organization that tries to apply pressure on people in order to manufacture a stereotype image of Jews that suits their idea of a good time." The album's commercial success was attributable in part to "Bobby Brown". Due to its explicit lyrics, the song did not get airplay in the U.S., but it topped the charts in several European countries where English is not the primary language.

Joe's Garage has been described as a "bona fide masterpiece". The project initially had to be released in two parts due to economic conditions. The first was a single LP Joe's Garage Act I in September 1979, followed by a double LP Joe's Garage Acts II and III in November 1979. The story features singer Ike Willis as the lead character in a rock opera about the danger of political systems, the suppression of freedom of speech and music—inspired in part by the 1979 Islamic Iranian revolution that had made music illegal—and about the "strange relationship Americans have with sex and sexual frankness". The Act I album reached number 27 on the Billboard 200 chart. It contains the song "Catholic Girls" (a riposte to the controversies of "Jewish Princess") and the title track, which was also released as a single. The second and third acts have extended guitar improvisations, which were recorded live, then combined with studio backing tracks. Zappa described this process as xenochrony. The band included drummer Vinnie Colaiuta (with whom Zappa had a particularly strong musical rapport) Included is one of Zappa's guitar "signature pieces", "Watermelon in Easter Hay". In 1987, all three acts were reissued together as a 3-LP and 2-CD set.

Zappa had been known for his long hair since the mid-1960s, but he had Gail cut it short around August 1979. That autumn he cancelled tour plans to stay home with newborn daughter Diva, and celebrate the birthdays of children Moon and Dweezil in September. At this time Zappa also completed the Utility Muffin Research Kitchen (UMRK) studios, which were located at his house, thereby giving him complete freedom in his work.

On Zappa's 39th birthday, December 21, 1979, his film Baby Snakes premiered in New York City. He described it as "A movie about people who do stuff that is not normal". The 2 hour and 40 minute film shows concerts in New York during Halloween 1977, with a band featuring keyboardist Tommy Mars, percussionist Ed Mann and guitarist Adrian Belew. It also contained clay animation by Bruce Bickford who's work had earlier appeared on Zappa's 1974 TV special A Token of His Extreme and later in the 1982 video The Dub Room Special. The movie had a highly successful initial release in Manhattan, but did not do well in theatrical distribution, It later won the Premier Grand Prix at the First International Music Festival in Paris in 1981.

== 1980–1993: Later years ==
=== Beginning of Barking Pumpkin Records ===
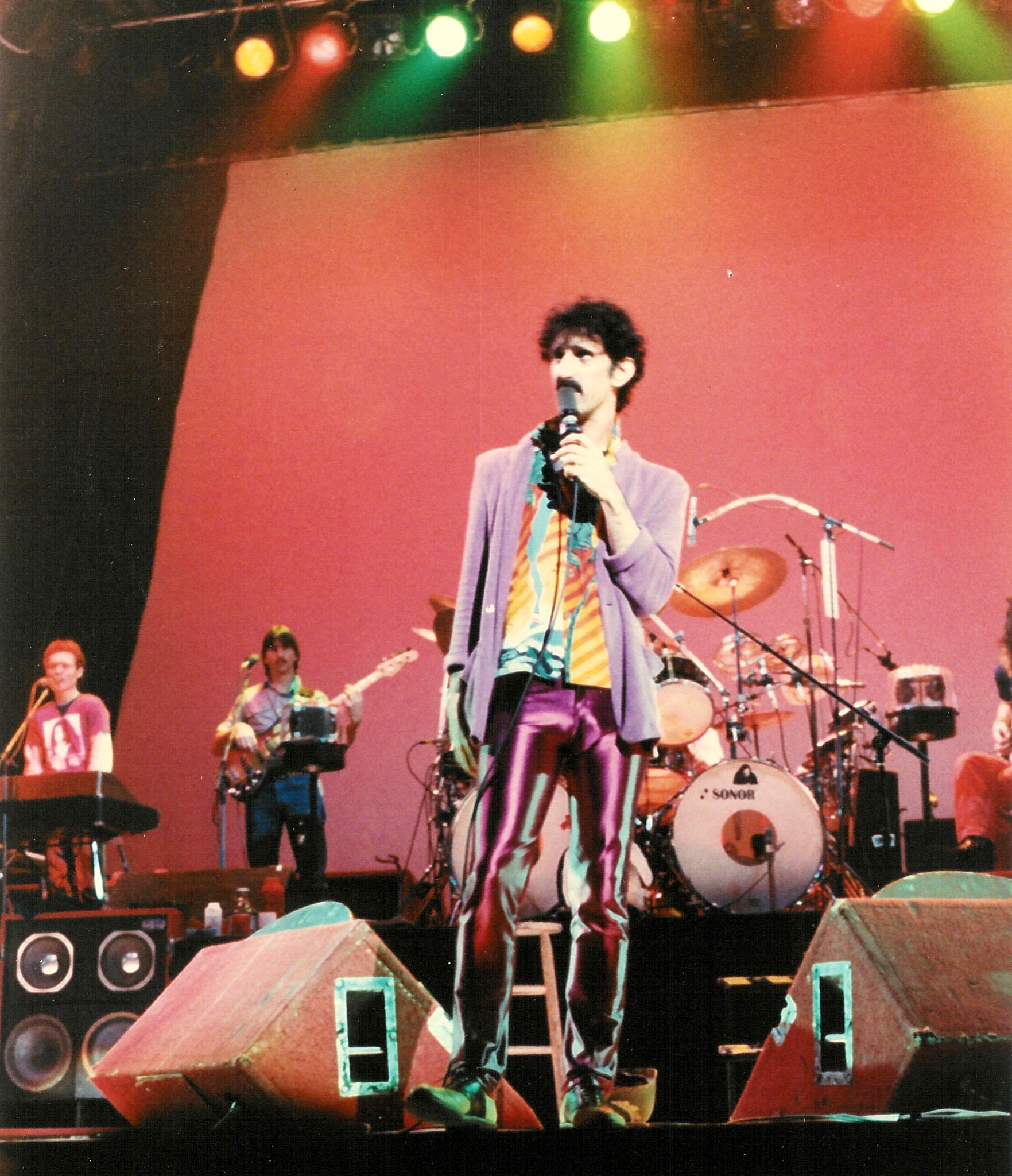
Zappa performing at the Memorial Auditorium, Buffalo, New York, October 1980. The concert was released in 2007 as Buffalo.

Zappa cut ties with Phonogram after the distributor refused to release his song "I Don't Wanna Get Drafted", which was recorded in February 1980. The single was released independently by Zappa in the United States and was picked up by CBS Records internationally.

After spending much of 1980 on the road, Zappa released Tinsel Town Rebellion in 1981. It was the first release on his own Barking Pumpkin Records, and featured live recordings from 1979 and 1980, as well as a new studio track, "Fine Girl". The album is a mixture of complicated instrumentals and Zappa's use of sprechstimme (speaking song or voice)—a compositional technique used by such composers as Arnold Schoenberg and Alban Berg—showcasing some of the most accomplished bands Zappa ever had (mostly featuring drummer Vinnie Colaiuta). While some lyrics still raised controversy among critics, some of whom found them sexist, the political and sociological satire in songs like the title track and "The Blue Light" have been described as a "hilarious critique of the willingness of the American people to believe anything". The album is also notable for the presence of guitarist Steve Vai, who joined Zappa's touring band in late 1980.

In 1981, Zappa also released three instrumental albums, Shut Up 'n Play Yer Guitar, Shut Up 'N Play Yer Guitar Some More, and The Return of the Son of Shut Up 'N Play Yer Guitar, which were initially sold via mail order, but later released as one 3-LP set through CBS Records (now Sony Music Entertainment) due to popular demand.

The albums consist entirely of tracks in which Zappa is featured as a guitar soloist, and they are predominantly live recordings from 1979 to 1980; they highlight Zappa's improvisational skills with "beautiful performances from the backing group as well". Another guitar-only album, Guitar, was released in 1988, and a third, Trance-Fusion, which Zappa completed shortly before his death, was released in 2006.

"Shut Up 'N Play Yer Guitar" (recorded 1979, released 1981)
The title track on Shut Up 'N Play Yer Guitar features Zappa's guitar improvisations.

The same year, the double album You Are What You Is was released. The album mainly consisted of rock songs with Zappa's sardonic social commentary—satirical lyrics directed at teenagers, the media, and religious and political hypocrisy. "Dumb All Over" is a tirade against religion, as is "Heavenly Bank Account", wherein Zappa rails against TV evangelists such as Jerry Falwell and Pat Robertson for their purported influence on the U.S. administration as well as their use of religion as a means of raising money. Songs like "Society Pages" and "I'm a Beautiful Guy" show Zappa's dismay with the Reagan era and its "obscene pursuit of wealth and happiness". Zappa made his only music video for a song from this album – "You Are What You Is" – directed by Jerry Watson, produced by Paul Flattery. The video was banned from MTV, though was later featured by Mike Judge in the Beavis & Butthead episode "Canoe". Also included is the guitar instrumental, "Theme from the 3rd Movement of Sinister Footwear" which he adapted from a ballet performed with the Berkeley Symphony Orchestra in 1984.

Zappa later expanded on his television appearances in a non-musical role. He was an actor or voice artist in episodes of Shelley Duvall's Faerie Tale Theatre, Miami Vice and The Ren & Stimpy Show. A voice part in The Simpsons never materialized, to creator Matt Groening's disappointment (Groening was a neighbor of Zappa and a lifelong fan).

=== "Valley Girl" and classical performances ===
In May 1982, Zappa released Ship Arriving Too Late to Save a Drowning Witch, which featured his biggest selling single ever, the Grammy Award-nominated song "Valley Girl" (topping out at No. 32 on the Billboard charts). In her improvised lyrics to the song, Zappa's daughter Moon satirized the patois of teenage girls from the San Fernando Valley, which popularized many "Valleyspeak" expressions such as "gag me with a spoon", "fer sure, fer sure", "grody to the max", and "barf out".

The first of Zappa's lawsuits against Warner was scheduled to go to court starting in January 1982. All of Zappa's Bizarre and DiscReet recordings also went out of print when the Warner distribution agreement ended in 1982. The Los Angeles Times quoted a Warner representative saying that Zappa's releases of the 1970s "consistently sold hundreds of thousands of units, which wasn't huge, but it was substantial." Zappa said in 1983 that a lawsuit had recently been resolved, and that he was once again able to access his vault of tape and film, which had been locked up by "another person". This allowed him to restart work on unfinished projects, such as the Uncle Meat film. The unnamed person was, presumably, his former manager Herb Cohen.

A 1983 album The Man from Utopia, featured an anti-drug single "Cocaine Decisions". "The Dangerous Kitchen" and "The Jazz Discharge Party Hats" are continuations of the sprechstimme vocal excursions on Tinseltown Rebellion, and the album also has jazzy rock instrumentals "Mōggio" and "We Are Not Alone". A second 1983 album, London Symphony Orchestra, Vol. I, includes orchestral Zappa compositions conducted by Kent Nagano and performed by the London Symphony Orchestra (LSO). A second record of these sessions, London Symphony Orchestra, Vol. II was released in 1987. The material was recorded under a tight schedule with Zappa providing all funding, helped by the commercial success of "Valley Girl". Zappa was not satisfied with the LSO recordings. He drew particular attention to the performance of "Strictly Genteel", which was recorded after the trumpet section had been out for drinks on a break: the track needed 40 edits to hide out-of-tune notes.

Conductor Nagano, who was pleased with the experience, noted that "in fairness to the orchestra, the music is humanly very, very difficult". Some reviews noted that the recordings were the best representation of Zappa's orchestral work so far. In 1984 Zappa teamed again with Nagano and the Berkeley Symphony Orchestra for a live performance of A Zappa Affair with augmented orchestra, life-size puppets, and moving stage sets. Although critically acclaimed, the work was a financial failure, and only performed twice. Zappa was invited by conference organizer Thomas Wells to be the keynote speaker at the American Society of University Composers at the Ohio State University. It was there Zappa delivered an address entitled "Bingo! There Goes Your Tenure", and had two of his orchestra pieces, "Dupree's Paradise" and "Naval Aviation in Art?" performed by the Columbus Symphony Orchestra and ProMusica Chamber Orchestra of Columbus. Zappa's management relationship with Bennett Glotzer ended in 1984. Starting in 1985 Gail began managing much of the Zappa business empire, which included a record label, a mail-order company, a video company and a music publishing firm.

=== Beginning of Synclavier works ===
"Naval Aviation in Art?" (1984)
A Zappa composition for classical ensemble from The Perfect Stranger (1984)

In 1983, Zappa began using the Synclavier, an early digital synthesizer that over time became his primary compositional and performance tool. According to Zappa, "With the Synclavier, any group of imaginary instruments can be invited to play the most difficult passages ... with one-millisecond accuracy—every time". Even though it essentially did away with the need for musicians, Zappa viewed the Synclavier and real-life musicians as separate.

In late 1984, he released four albums. The Perfect Stranger contains orchestral works commissioned and conducted by celebrated conductor, composer, and pianist Pierre Boulez (who was listed as an influence on Freak Out!), and performed by his Ensemble intercontemporain. These were juxtaposed with premiere Synclavier pieces. Again, Zappa was not satisfied with the performances of his orchestral works, regarding them as under-rehearsed, but in the album liner notes he respectfully thanks Boulez's demands for precision. The Synclavier pieces stood in contrast to the orchestral works, as the sounds were electronically generated and not, as became possible shortly thereafter, sampled.

Them or Us is a two LP set of studio and live rock recordings. It includes a version of the Allman Brothers Band song "Whipping Post" and "Be in My Video", Zappa's satirical take on perceived visual clichés of the MTV channel. Francesco Zappa, a Synclavier rendition of works by 18th-century composer Francesco Zappa, was also released in 1984.

The album Thing-Fish was an ambitious three-record set in the style of a Broadway play dealing with a dystopian "what-if" scenario involving feminism, homosexuality, manufacturing and distribution of the AIDS virus, and a eugenics program conducted by the United States government. New vocals were combined with previously released tracks and new Synclavier music; "the work is an extraordinary example of bricolage".

=== Merchandising ===
Zappa's mail-order merchandise business, Barfko-Swill, established during the 1980s by Zappa's wife Gail, offers t-shirts, videos, posters, sheet music, and collector's recordings, most of them unavailable through other media. Gail has explained why Barfko-Swill was founded: "Just piles and piles of fan mail sitting around unanswered or with no response. The first thing that we did was put a list together from the fan mail and made a Barking Pumpkin t-shirt available which we still have – same old shirt, same old logo, same old price – just to see what would happen. Everybody would write to us and ask us if there was something they could get besides records. ... That was really the primary reason for getting into the business – for setting up Barfko-Swill – in those days was to be independent. To not have to rely on a major record company's interest and ability to promote your product. And that was what the challenge was for me. I prefer the autonomy."

From 1983 to 1993, Barfko-Swill was run by Gerry Fialka; Fialka also worked for Zappa as archivist, production assistant, tour assistant, and factotum, and answered the phone for Zappa's Barking Pumpkin Records hotline. The 1987 VHS release of Zappa's film Baby Snakes includes, as an extra feature, Fialka giving a tour of Barfko-Swill. He is credited on-screen as "Gerald Fialka Cool Guy Who Wraps Stuff So It Doesn't Break". A short clip of this tour is also included in the 2020 documentary film Zappa.

=== Digital medium and last tour ===
Starting in the mid-1980s, Zappa undertook a comprehensive re-release program of his earlier vinyl recordings. He personally oversaw the remastering of all his 1960s, 1970s, and early 1980s albums for the new digital compact disc (CD) medium. (Note: For a comprehensive comparison of vinyl and CD releases, see "The Frank Zappa Album Versions Guide – Index". The Zappa Patio. lukpac.org.) Certain aspects of these re-issues have been criticized by some fans as being unfaithful to the original recordings, with changes made to We're Only in It for the Money, Cruising with Ruben & the Jets, Uncle Meat, and Sleep Dirt being the most strongly criticized. Nearly twenty years before the advent of online music stores, Zappa had proposed to replace "phonographic record merchandising" of music by "direct digital-to-digital transfer" through phone or cable TV (with royalty payments and consumer billing automatically built into the accompanying software). In 1989, Zappa considered his idea a "miserable flop".

The album Jazz from Hell, released in 1986, earned Zappa his first Grammy Award in 1988 for Best Rock Instrumental Performance. Except for one live guitar solo ("St. Etienne"), the album exclusively featured compositions brought to life by the Synclavier.

Zappa's last tour began on February 2, 1988, in Albany, New York and ended on June 6 in Genoa, Italy. By the end, the band had a repertoire of over 100 mostly Zappa compositions. With 12 members, it was one of his largest touring ensembles, including a five piece horn section. The group split up early under acrimonious circumstances before Zappa's intended completion date. The tour was documented on the albums Broadway the Hard Way (new material featuring songs with strong political emphasis); The Best Band You Never Heard in Your Life (Zappa "standards" and an eclectic collection of cover tunes, ranging from Maurice Ravel's Boléro to Led Zeppelin's "Stairway to Heaven"); and Make a Jazz Noise Here (a selection of Zappa's more instrumentally complex and jazz orientated material). An album of guitar solos from this tour also appeared as the posthumous 2006 album Trance-Fusion, a follow-up to the Shut Up 'n Play Yer Guitar and Guitar albums.

More recordings from the 1988 tour would appear as part of You Can't Do That on Stage Anymore, a series of six double CDs compiled by Zappa from unreleased live recordings, dating back to the earliest Mothers recordings from 1965. The six volumes were released between 1988 and 1992.

The Real Frank Zappa Book, co-written with Peter Occhiogrosso, was published by Poseidon Press in 1989. Zappa appeared on the TV interview show Larry King Live to promote it. He explained the title by saying he wrote it in response to previous unauthorized books, which he considered to be stupid and exploitative.

=== Health deterioration ===
"N-Lite" (recorded circa 1991-1992, released 1994)
One of Zappa's works for Synclavier on Civilization Phaze III, cited as his "last great work".

In 1990, Zappa was diagnosed with terminal prostate cancer. The disease had been developing unnoticed for years and was considered inoperable. After the diagnosis, Zappa devoted most of his energy to modern orchestral and Synclavier works. Shortly before his death in 1993 he completed Civilization Phaze III, a major Synclavier work that he had begun in the 1980s. (Note: It brought him a posthumous Grammy Award (with Gail Zappa) for Best Recording Package – Boxed in 1994. "Grammy Winners". National Academy of Recording Arts and Sciences.)

In 1991, Zappa was chosen to be one of four featured composers at the Frankfurt Festival in 1992 (the others were John Cage, Karlheinz Stockhausen, and Alexander Knaifel). Zappa was approached by the German chamber ensemble Ensemble Modern, which was interested in playing his music for the event. Although ill, he invited them to Los Angeles for rehearsals of new compositions and new arrangements of older material. Zappa also got along with the musicians, and the concerts in Germany and Austria were set up for later in the year. Zappa also performed in 1991 in Prague, claiming that "was the first time that he had a reason to play his guitar in 3 years", and that that moment was just "the beginning of a new country", and asked the public to "try to keep your country unique, do not change it into something else".

John Kricfalusi, creator of Nickelodeon's The Ren & Stimpy Show, idolized Zappa and got him to voice the Pope in the episode "Powdered Toast Man"; as Zappa was too ill to head to Spümcø at Los Angeles, he recorded his lines at his residence. The episode aired in August 1992 to significant controversy unrelated to Zappa's appearance.

In September 1992, the concerts went ahead as scheduled but Zappa could only appear at two in Frankfurt due to illness. At the first concert, he conducted the opening "Overture" and the final "G-Spot Tornado", as well as the theatrical "Food Gathering in Post-Industrial America, 1992" and "Welcome to the United States" (the remainder of the program was conducted by the ensemble's regular conductor Peter Rundel). Zappa received a 20-minute ovation. "G-Spot Tornado" was performed with Canadian dancer Louise Lecavalier. It was Zappa's last professional public appearance, as the cancer was spreading to such an extent that he was in too much pain to enjoy an event that he otherwise found "exhilarating". Recordings from the concerts appeared on The Yellow Shark (1993), Zappa's last release during his lifetime, and some material from studio rehearsals appeared on the posthumous Everything Is Healing Nicely (1999).

== Death ==
On December 4, 1993, Zappa died from prostate cancer at his home with his wife and children by his side. On December 6, his family publicly announced that "Composer Frank Zappa left for his final tour just before 6:00 P.M. on Saturday". He was buried at a private ceremony in a grave at the Westwood Village Memorial Park Cemetery, in Los Angeles. The grave remains unmarked and located just to the right of actor Lew Ayres' grave. Zappa was 52 years old.

== Artistry ==
=== Musical style and classification ===
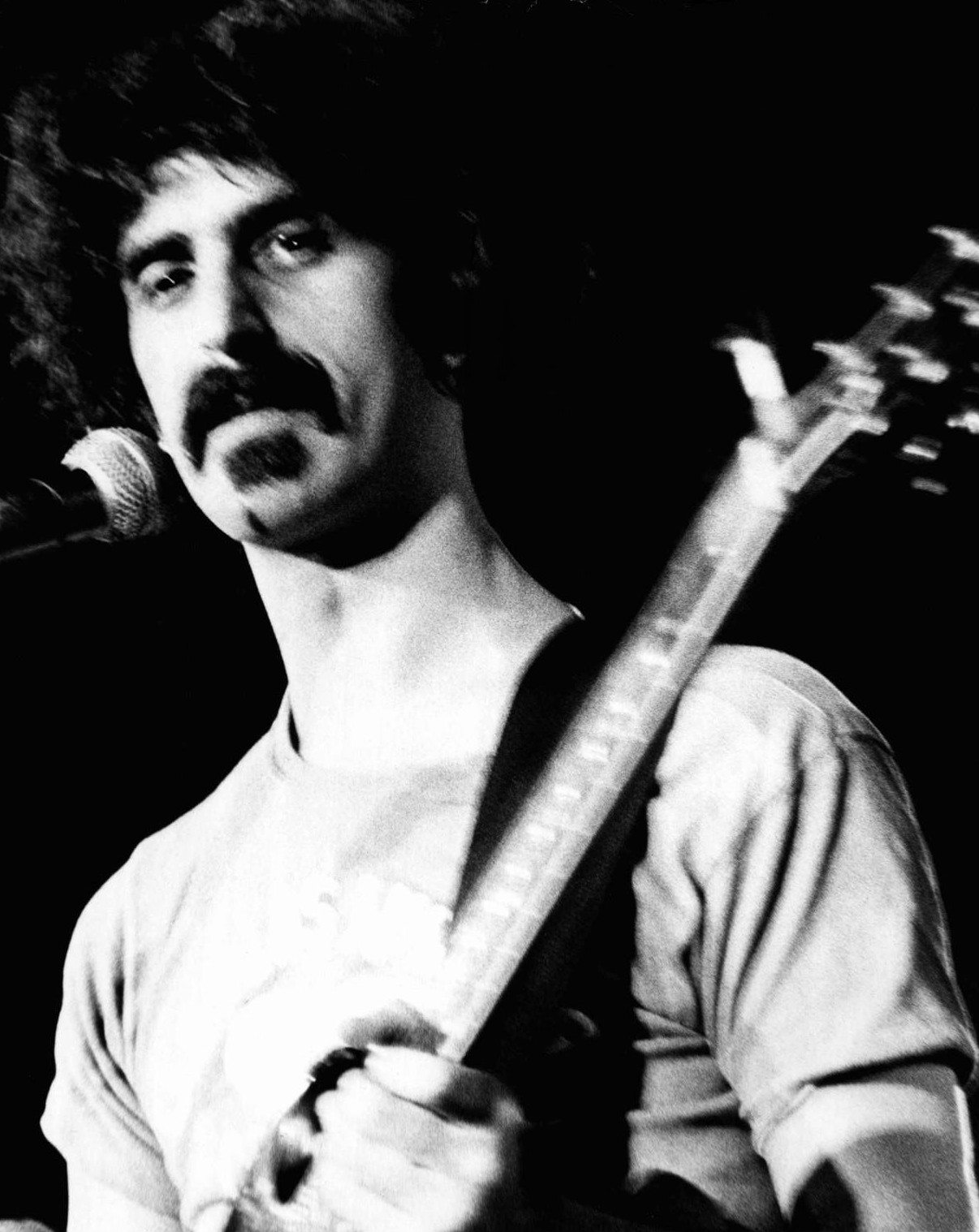
Zappa performing in 1973

The general phases of Zappa's music have been variously categorized under blues rock, experimental rock, jazz, classical, avant-pop, experimental pop, comedy rock, doo-wop, jazz fusion, progressive rock, proto-prog, avant-jazz, and psychedelic rock.

=== Influences ===
Zappa grew up influenced by avant-garde composers such as Edgard Varèse, Igor Stravinsky, and Anton Webern; 1950s blues artists Clarence "Gatemouth" Brown, Guitar Slim, Howlin' Wolf, Johnny "Guitar" Watson, and B.B. King; Egyptian composer Halim El-Dabh; R&B and doo-wop groups (particularly local pachuco groups); and modern jazz. His own heterogeneous ethnic background, and the diverse social and cultural mix in and around greater Los Angeles, were crucial in the formation of Zappa as a practitioner of underground music and of his later distrustful and openly critical attitude towards "mainstream" social, political and musical movements. He frequently lampooned musical fads like psychedelia, rock opera and disco. (Note: Among his many musical satires are the 1967 songs "Flower Punk" (which parodies the song "Hey Joe") and "Who Needs the Peace Corps?", which are critiques of the late-Sixties commercialization of the hippie phenomenon.) Television also exerted a strong influence, as demonstrated by quotations from show themes and advertising jingles found in his later works.

In his book The Real Frank Zappa Book, Zappa credited composer Spike Jones for his frequent use of funny sound effects, mouth noises, and humorous percussion interjections. After explaining his ideas on this, he said "I owe this part of my musical existence to Spike Jones."

=== Project/Object ===
Zappa's albums make extensive use of segued tracks, breaklessly joining the elements of his albums. His total output is unified by a conceptual continuity he termed "Project/Object", with numerous musical phrases, ideas, and characters reappearing across his albums. He also called it a "conceptual continuity", meaning that any project or album was part of a larger project. Everything was connected, and musical themes and lyrics reappeared in different form on later albums. Conceptual continuity clues are found throughout Zappa's entire œuvre.

=== Techniques ===
==== Guitar playing ====
Zappa is widely recognized as one of the most significant electric guitar soloists. In a 1983 issue of Guitar World, John Swenson declared: "the fact of the matter is that [Zappa] is one of the greatest guitarists we have and is sorely unappreciated as such." His idiosyncratic style developed gradually and was mature by the early 1980s, by which time his live performances featured lengthy improvised solos during many songs. A November 2016 feature by the editors of Guitar Player magazine wrote: "Brimming with sophisticated motifs and convoluted rhythms, Zappa's extended excursions are more akin to symphonies than they are to guitar solos." The symphonic comparison stems from his habit of introducing melodic themes that, like a symphony's main melodies, were repeated with variations throughout his solos. He was further described as using a wide variety of scales and modes, enlivened by "unusual rhythmic combinations". His left hand was capable of smooth legato technique, while Zappa's right was "one of the fastest pick hands in the business." In 2016, Dweezil Zappa explained a distinctive element of his father's guitar improvisation technique was relying heavily on upstrokes much more than many other guitarists, who are more likely to use downstrokes with their picking.

His song "Outside Now" from Joe's Garage poked fun at the negative reception of Zappa's guitar technique by those more commercially minded, as the song's narrator lives in a world where music is outlawed and he imagines "imaginary guitar notes that would irritate/An executive kind of guy", lyrics that are followed by one of Zappa's characteristically quirky solos in 11/8 time. Zappa transcriptionist Kasper Sloots wrote, "Zappa's guitar solos aren't meant to show off technically (Zappa hasn't claimed to be a big virtuoso on the instrument), but for the pleasure it gives trying to build a composition right in front of an audience without knowing what the outcome will be."

Zappa's guitar style was not without its critics. English guitarist and bandleader John McLaughlin, whose band Mahavishnu Orchestra toured with the Mothers of Invention in 1973, opined that Zappa was "very interesting as a human being and a very interesting composer" and that he "was a very good musician but he was a dictator in his band," and that he "was taking very long guitar solos [when performing live]—10–15 minute guitar solos and really he should have taken two or three minute guitar solos, because they were a little bit boring."

In 2000, he was ranked No. 36 on VH1's 100 Greatest Artists of Hard Rock. In 2004, Rolling Stone magazine ranked him at No. 71 on its list of the "100 Greatest Artists of All Time", and in 2011 at No. 22 on its list of the "100 Greatest Guitarists of All Time".

==== Tape manipulation ====
During recording sessions in New York in 1967, Zappa increasingly used tape editing as a compositional tool. A prime example is found on the double album Uncle Meat (1969), where the track "King Kong" is edited from various studio and live performances. Zappa had begun regularly recording concerts, (Note: In the process, he built up a vast archive of live recordings. In the late 1980s some of these recordings were collected for the 12-CD set You Can't Do That on Stage Anymore.) and because of his insistence on precise tuning and timing, he was able to augment his studio productions with excerpts from live shows, and vice versa. Later, he combined recordings of different compositions into new pieces, irrespective of the tempo or meter of the sources. He dubbed this process "xenochrony" (strange synchronizations)—ref from the Greek "xeno" (alien or strange) and "chronos" (time).

== Personal life ==
=== Family ===
Zappa was married to Kathryn J. "Kay" Sherman from 1960 to 1963. In 1967, he married Adelaide Gail Sloatman. He and his second wife had four children: Moon (born 1967), Dweezil (born 1969), Ahmet (born 1974), and Diva (born 1979). Moon and Ahmet sang on Frank's 1981 album You Are What You Is, while Moon also provided the "Valley girl" voice on the song of the same name on 1982's Ship Arriving Too Late to Save a Drowning Witch. The song became Frank's only US Top 40 hit single and is credited with popularizing valspeak and valley girl culture, despite being intended by Frank and Moon as a parody and criticism of it. An accomplished guitarist in his own right, Dweezil made several guest appearances on stage with Frank during the 1982, 1984, and 1988 tours, and Frank produced Dweezil's first album Havin' a Bad Day in 1986.

Following Zappa's death, his widow Gail created the Zappa Family Trust, which owns the rights to Zappa's music and some other creative output: 62 albums released during Zappa's lifetime and 74 released posthumously as of December 2026. Upon Gail's death in October 2015, the Zappa children received shares of the trust; Ahmet and Diva received 30% each, Moon and Dweezil received 20% each. The original trust, signed by Frank and Gail in 1990, assured the four children would receive equal shares, but this was altered by Gail sometime after Frank's death.

In the mid-1980s, Zappa learned of an obscure 18th century Italian composer and cellist named Francesco Zappa. Initially assuming him to be an ancestor, Frank recorded and released an album of Francesco's music, Francesco Zappa, in 1984. It was subsequently found that Frank and Francesco were not actually related, which Frank confirmed in The Real Frank Zappa Book in 1989.

=== Captain Beefheart ===
Zappa and Don Van Vliet met when they were both teenagers and shared an interest in rhythm and blues and Chicago blues. They collaborated from this early stage with Zappa's scripts for "teenage operettas", such as "Captain Beefheart & the Grunt People", with Vliet eventually adopting the Captain Beefheart name. The earliest known recording of either Zappa or Beefheart is a collaboration between them, "Lost in a Whirlpool", recorded around 1958/1959 and included on the posthumous Zappa album The Lost Episodes in 1996. In 1963, the pair recorded a demo at the Pal Recording Studio in Cucamonga as the Soots, seeking support from a major label. Their efforts were unsuccessful, as Vliet's Howlin' Wolf-influenced vocal style and Zappa's distorted guitar were "not on the agenda" at the time. In 1965, while Zappa formed the Mothers of Invention, Beefheart assembled Captain Beefheart and His Magic Band. Their third album, 1969's critically acclaimed Trout Mask Replica, was produced by Zappa. That same year, Beefheart provided the vocal on "Willie the Pimp" on the Hot Rats album. Beefheart also played the harmonica on "San Ber'dino" (credited as "Bloodshot Rollin' Red") on One Size Fits All (1975) and "Find Her Finer" on Zoot Allures (1976).

Over the years, Zappa and Beefheart's friendship was sometimes complicated by rivalry, as musicians drifted back and forth between their groups. Beefheart joined Zappa's band on the early 1975 tour, documented on the Bongo Fury album, mainly because conflicting contractual obligations made Beefheart unable to tour or record independently at the time. Their relationship grew acrimonious on the tour to the point that they refused to talk to one another. Zappa became irritated by Beefheart, who drew constantly, including while on stage, filling one of his large sketch books with rapidly executed portraits and warped caricatures of Zappa. Musically, Beefheart's primitive style contrasted sharply with Zappa's compositional discipline and abundant technique. Mothers of Invention drummer Jimmy Carl Black described the situation as "two geniuses" on "ego trips". Estranged for years afterwards, they reconciled by the end of Zappa's life.

== Beliefs and politics ==
=== Drugs ===
Zappa stated, "Drugs do not become a problem until the person who uses the drugs does something to you, or does something that would affect your life that you don't want to have happen to you, like an airline pilot who crashes because he was full of drugs." Zappa was a heavy tobacco smoker for most of his life, and critical of anti-tobacco campaigns. (Note: He considered such campaigns as yuppie inventions and noted that "Some people like garlic. ... I like pepper, tobacco and coffee. That's my metabolism." and once described tobacco as his "favorite vegetable",)

While he disapproved of drug use, he criticized the war on drugs, comparing it to alcohol prohibition; he stated that the United States Treasury would benefit from the decriminalization and regulation of drugs. Describing his philosophical views, Zappa stated, "I believe that people have a right to decide their own destinies; people own themselves. I also believe that, in a democracy, government exists because (and only so long as) individual citizens give it a 'temporary license to exist'—in exchange for a promise that it will behave itself. In a democracy, you own the government—it doesn't own you."

=== Government and religion ===
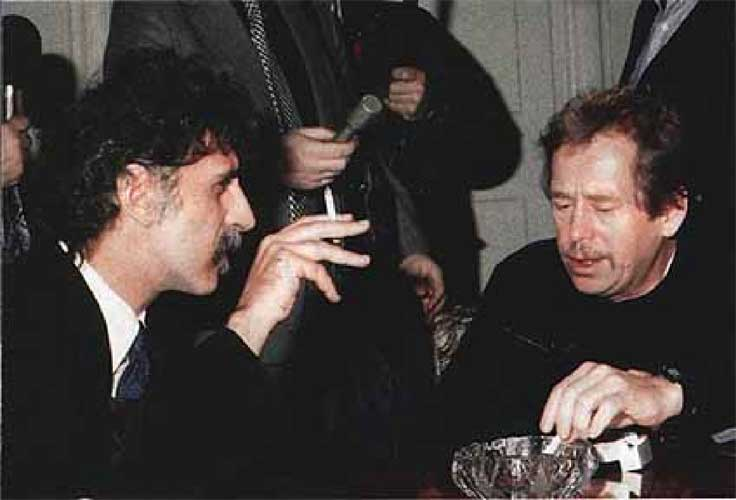
Zappa with Václav Havel, 1990

In a 1991 interview, Zappa reported that he was a registered Democrat but added "that might not last long—I'm going to shred that." Describing his political views, Zappa categorized himself as a "practical conservative". (Note: "Politically, I consider myself to be a (don't laugh) 'Practical Conservative'. I want a smaller, less intrusive government, and lower taxes. What? You too?") He favored limited government and low taxes; he also stated that he approved of national defense, social security, and other federal programs, but only if citizens are willing and able to pay for them. He opposed military drafts, saying that military service should be voluntary. He favored capitalism, entrepreneurship, and independent business, stating that musicians could make more from owning their own businesses than from collecting royalties. He opposed communism, stating, "A system that doesn't allow ownership... has—to put it mildly—a fatal design flaw." He had placed messages on his album covers to encourage his fans to register to vote; further, throughout 1988, Zappa had registration booths at his concerts. He even considered running for president of the United States as an independent.

Zappa was an atheist. He recalled his parents being "pretty religious" and trying to make him go to Catholic school despite his resentment. He felt disgust towards organized religion (Christianity in particular) because he believed that it promoted ignorance and anti-intellectualism. He held the view that the Garden of Eden story shows that the essence of Christianity is to oppose gaining knowledge. Some of his songs, concert performances, interviews and public debates in the 1980s criticized and derided Republicans and their policies—President Ronald Reagan, the Strategic Defense Initiative (SDI), televangelism, and the Christian Right—and warned that the United States government was in danger of becoming a "fascist theocracy".

In early 1990, Zappa visited Czechoslovakia at the request of President Václav Havel. The meeting had been arranged by keyboardist Michael Kocáb. A longtime admirer of Zappa's commitment to individualism, Havel designated him as Czechoslovakia's "Special Ambassador to the West on Trade, Culture and Tourism". Havel was a lifelong fan of Zappa, who had great influence in the avant-garde and underground scene in Central Europe in the 1970s and 1980s. The Plastic People of the Universe, a Czechoslovak jazz rock group associated with Prague underground culture, took its name from Zappa's 1967 song "Plastic People". Under pressure from Secretary of State, James Baker, Zappa's posting (as Czech 'Special Ambassador') was withdrawn. Havel made Zappa an unofficial cultural attaché instead. Zappa planned to develop an international consulting enterprise to facilitate trade between the former Eastern Bloc and Western businesses.

=== Anti-censorship activism ===
Zappa expressed opinions on censorship when he appeared on CNN's Crossfire TV series and debated issues with Washington Times commentator John Lofton in 1986. On September 19, 1985, Zappa testified before the United States Senate Commerce, Technology, and Transportation committee, attacking the Parents Music Resource Center (PMRC), an organization co-founded by Tipper Gore, wife of then-senator Al Gore. The PMRC consisted of many wives of politicians, including the wives of five members of the committee, and was founded to address the issue of song lyrics with sexual or satanic content. During Zappa's testimony, he stated that there was a clear conflict of interest between the PMRC due to the relations of its founders to the politicians who were then trying to pass what he referred to as the "Blank Tape Tax". Kandy Stroud, a spokeswoman for the PMRC, announced that Senator Gore (who co-founded the committee) was a co-sponsor of that legislation. Zappa suggested that record labels were trying to get the bill passed quickly through committees, one of which was chaired by Senator Strom Thurmond, who was also affiliated with the PMRC. Zappa further said that this committee was being used as a distraction from that bill being passed, which would lead only to the benefit of a select few in the music industry.

Zappa saw their activities as on a path towards censorship and called their proposal for voluntary labelling of records with explicit content "extortion" of the music industry.

In his prepared statement, he said:

The PMRC proposal is an ill-conceived piece of nonsense which fails to deliver any real benefits to children, infringes the civil liberties of people who are not children, and promises to keep the courts busy for years dealing with the interpretational and enforcemental problems inherent in the proposal's design. It is my understanding that, in law, First Amendment issues are decided with a preference for the least restrictive alternative. In this context, the PMRC's demands are the equivalent of treating dandruff by decapitation. ... The establishment of a rating system, voluntary or otherwise, opens the door to an endless parade of moral quality control programs based on things certain Christians do not like. What if the next bunch of Washington wives demands a large yellow "J" on all material written or performed by Jews, to save helpless children from exposure to concealed Zionist doctrine?

Zappa set excerpts from the PMRC hearings to Synclavier music in his composition "Porn Wars" on the 1985 album Frank Zappa Meets the Mothers of Prevention, and the full recording was released in 2010 as Congress Shall Make No Law... Zappa is heard interacting with Senators Fritz Hollings, Slade Gorton and Al Gore.

== Legacy ==
Zappa was a controversial figure. As Geoffrey Himes noted in 1993 after the artist's death, Zappa was hailed as a genius by conductor Kent Nagano and nominated by Czechoslovak President Václav Havel to the country's cultural ambassadorship; however, in his lifetime, Zappa was rejected twice for admission into the Rock and Roll Hall of Fame. In Christgau's Record Guide: Rock Albums of the Seventies (1981), Robert Christgau dismissed Zappa's music as "sexist adolescent drivel ... with meters and voicings and key changes that are as hard to play as they are easy to forget". According to Himes:

Admirers and detractors agree that Zappa's music—with its odd time signatures, unorthodox harmonies and fiendishly difficult lines—boasts a rare cerebral complexity. But that's where the agreement ends. Some fans find his sophomoric jokes ("Don't Eat the Yellow Snow") and pop music parodies ("Sheik Yerbouti") a crucial counterbalance to the rarefied density of the music; other devotees find the jokes an irrelevant sideshow to music best appreciated in a chamber or orchestral setting. The critics find the humor's smug iconoclasm a symptom of the essential emptiness of Zappa's intellectual exercises.

=== Acclaim and honors ===
Frank Zappa was one of the first to try tearing down the barriers between rock, jazz, and classical music. In the late Sixties his Mothers of Invention would slip from Stravinsky's "Petroushka" into The Dovells' "Bristol Stomp" before breaking down into saxophone squeals inspired by Albert Ayler.

— Miller 1980, p. 348

The Rolling Stone Album Guide (2004) writes: "Frank Zappa dabbled in virtually all kinds of music—and, whether guised as a satirical rocker, jazz-rock fusionist, guitar virtuoso, electronics wizard, or orchestral innovator, his eccentric genius was undeniable." Even though his work drew inspiration from many different genres, Zappa was seen as establishing a coherent and personal expression. In 1980, biographer David Walley noted that "The whole structure of his music is unified, not neatly divided by dates or time sequences and it is all building into a composite". On commenting on Zappa's music, politics and philosophy, Barry Miles noted in 2004 that they cannot be separated: "It was all one; all part of his 'conceptual continuity'."

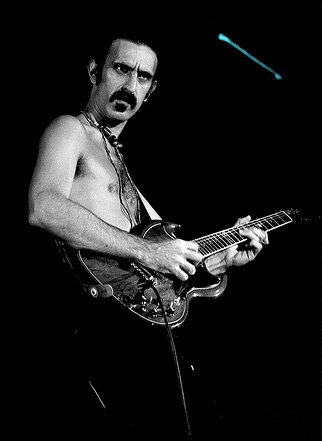
Zappa in 1977

Guitar Player devoted a special issue to Zappa in 1992, and asked on the cover "Is FZ America's Best Kept Musical Secret?" Editor Don Menn remarked that the issue was about "The most important composer to come out of modern popular music". Among those contributing to the issue was composer and musicologist Nicolas Slonimsky, who conducted premiere performances of works of Ives and Varèse in the 1930s. He became friends with Zappa in the 1980s, and said, "I admire everything Frank does, because he practically created the new musical millennium. He does beautiful, beautiful work ... It has been my luck to have lived to see the emergence of this totally new type of music." Conductor Kent Nagano remarked in the same issue that "Frank is a genius. That's a word I don't use often ... In Frank's case it is not too strong ... He is extremely literate musically. I'm not sure if the general public knows that." Pierre Boulez told Musician magazine's posthumous Zappa tribute article that Zappa "was an exceptional figure because he was part of the worlds of rock and classical music and that both types of his work would survive." In 1994, jazz magazine DownBeat's critics poll placed Zappa in its Hall of Fame. Zappa was posthumously inducted into the Rock and Roll Hall of Fame in 1995. There, it was written that "Frank Zappa was rock and roll's sharpest musical mind and most astute social critic. He was the most prolific composer of his age, and he bridged genres—rock, jazz, classical, avant-garde and even novelty music—with masterful ease". He was ranked No. 36 on VH1's 100 Greatest Artists of Hard Rock in 2000. In 2005, the U.S. National Recording Preservation Board included We're Only in It for the Money in the National Recording Registry as "Frank Zappa's inventive and iconoclastic album presents a unique political stance, both anti-conservative and anti-counterculture, and features a scathing satire on hippiedom and America's reactions to it". The same year, Rolling Stone magazine ranked him at No. 71 on its list of the 100 Greatest Artists of All Time. In 2011, he was ranked at No. 22 on the list of the 100 Greatest Guitarists of All Time by the same magazine. In 2016, Guitar World magazine placed Zappa atop its list of "15 of the best progressive rock guitarists through the years". The street of Partinico where his father lived at number 13, Via Zammatà, has been renamed to Via Frank Zappa. Since his death, several musicians have been considered by critics as filling the artistic niche left behind by Zappa, in view of their prolific output, eclecticism and other qualities, including Devin Townsend, Mike Patton and Omar Rodríguez-López.

==== Grammy Awards ====
In the course of his career, Zappa was nominated for nine competitive Grammy Awards, which resulted in two wins (one posthumous). In 1998, he received the Grammy Lifetime Achievement Award.

Year	Nominee / work	Award	Result
1980	"Rat Tomago"	Best Rock Instrumental Performance	Nominated
1980	"Dancin' Fool"	Best Male Rock Vocal Performance	Nominated
1983	"Valley Girl"	Best Rock Performance by a Duo or Group with Vocal	Nominated
1985	The Perfect Stranger	Best New Classical Composition	Nominated
1988	"Jazz from Hell"	Best Instrumental Composition	Nominated
1988	Jazz from Hell	Best Rock Instrumental Performance (Orchestra, Group or Soloist)	Won
1989	Guitar	Best Rock Instrumental Performance (Orchestra, Group or Soloist)	Nominated
1990	Broadway the Hard Way	Best Musical Cast Show Album	Nominated
1996	Civilization Phaze III	Best Recording Package – Boxed	Won
1997	Frank Zappa	Lifetime Achievement Award	Honored

=== Artists influenced by Zappa ===
Many musicians, bands and orchestras from diverse genres have been influenced by Zappa's music. Rock artists such as The Plastic People of the Universe, Alice Cooper, Larry LaLonde of Primus, Fee Waybill of the Tubes all cite Zappa's influence, as do progressive, alternative, electronic and avant-garde/experimental rock artists like Can, (Note: "CAN was formed by ex-student of Stockhausen Irmin Schmidt, who, fired by the sounds of Jimi Hendrix and Frank Zappa abandoned his career in classic music to form a group which could utilise and transcend all boundaries of ethnic, electronic experimental and modern classical music." "CAN – The Lost Tapes". Spoon Records..) Pere Ubu, (Note: "The group is very influenced by Capt. Beefheart and Frank Zappa. The roots of Pere Ubu lie in a comedy cover band called Rocket from the Tombs ..."George Gimarc (1994). Punk Diary: 1970–1979. Vintage. p. 22. ISBN 978-0-09-952211-9..) Yes, Soft Machine, Henry Cow, Faust, Devo, Kraftwerk, Trey Anastasio and Jon Fishman of Phish, Jeff Buckley, John Frusciante, Steven Wilson, and The Aristocrats.

Paul McCartney regarded Sgt. Pepper's Lonely Hearts Club Band as the Beatles' Freak Out!. Jimi Hendrix and heavy rock and metal acts like Black Sabbath, Living Colour, Simon Phillips, Mike Portnoy, Warren DeMartini, Alex Skolnick, Steve Vai, Strapping Young Lad, System of a Down, and Clawfinger have acknowledged Zappa as inspiration. On the classical music scene, Tomas Ulrich, Meridian Arts Ensemble, Ensemble Ambrosius and the Fireworks Ensemble regularly perform Zappa's compositions and quote his influence. Contemporary jazz musicians and composers Bobby Sanabria, Bill Frisell and John Zorn are inspired by Zappa, as is funk legend George Clinton.

Other artists affected by Zappa include ambient composer Brian Eno, new age pianist George Winston, electronic composer Bob Gluck, parodist artist and disk jockey Dr. Demento, parodist and novelty composer "Weird Al" Yankovic, industrial music pioneer Genesis P-Orridge, rapper and record producer Moka Only, singer Cree Summer, noise music artist Masami Akita of Merzbow, the Italian pianist Stefano Bollani, the Italian band Elio e le Storie Tese and Chilean composer Cristián Crisosto from Fulano and Mediabanda.

=== References in arts and sciences ===
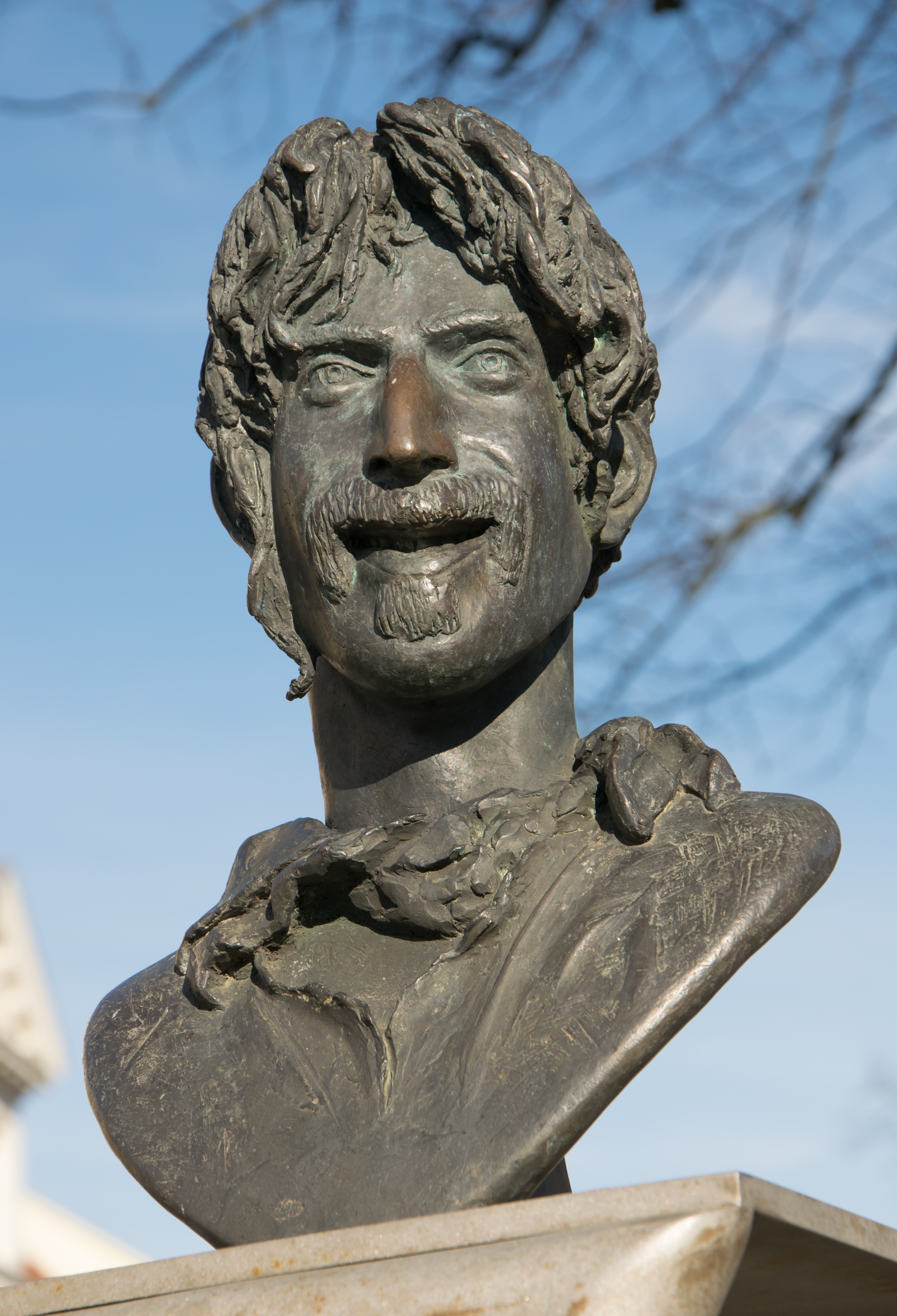
Frank Zappa bust by Vaclav Cesak in Bad Doberan, Germany

Scientists from various fields have honored Zappa by naming new discoveries after him. In 1967, paleontologist Leo P. Plas Jr., identified an extinct mollusc in Nevada and named it Amaurotoma zappa with the motivation that, "The specific name, zappa, honors Frank Zappa".

In the 1980s, biologist Ed Murdy named a genus of gobiid fishes of New Guinea Zappa, with a species named Zappa confluentus. Biologist Ferdinando Boero named a Californian jellyfish Phialella zappai (1987), noting that he had "pleasure in naming this species after the modern music composer".

Belgian biologists Bosmans and Bosselaers discovered in the early 1980s a Cameroonese spider, which they in 1994 named Pachygnatha zappa because "the ventral side of the abdomen of the female of this species strikingly resembles the artist's legendary moustache".

A gene of the bacterium Proteus mirabilis that causes urinary tract infections was in 1995 named zapA by three biologists from Maryland. In their scientific article, they "especially thank the late Frank Zappa for inspiration and assistance with genetic nomenclature". Repeating regions of the genome of the human tumor virus KSHV were named frnk, vnct and zppa in 1996 by Yuan Chang and Patrick S. Moore who discovered the virus. Also, a 143 base pair repeat sequence occurring at two positions was named waka/jwka. In the late 1990s, American paleontologists Marc Salak and Halard L. Lescinsky discovered a metazoan fossil, and named it Spygori zappania to honor "the late Frank Zappa ... whose mission paralleled that of the earliest paleontologists: to challenge conventional and traditional beliefs when such beliefs lacked roots in logic and reason".

In 1994, lobbying efforts initiated by psychiatrist John Scialli led the International Astronomical Union's Minor Planet Center to name an asteroid in Zappa's honor: 3834 Zappafrank. The asteroid was discovered in 1980 by Czechoslovak astronomer Ladislav Brožek, and the citation for its naming says that "Zappa was an eclectic, self-trained artist and composer ... Before 1989 he was regarded as a symbol of democracy and freedom by many people in Czechoslovakia". In 1995, a bust of Zappa by sculptor Konstantinas Bogdanas was installed in Vilnius, Lithuania. The choice of Zappa was explained as "a symbol that would mark the end of communism, but at the same time express that it wasn't always doom and gloom." A replica was offered to the city of Baltimore in 2008, and on September 19, 2010—the twenty-fifth anniversary of Zappa's testimony to the U.S. Senate—a ceremony dedicating the replica was held, and the bust was unveiled at a library in the city.

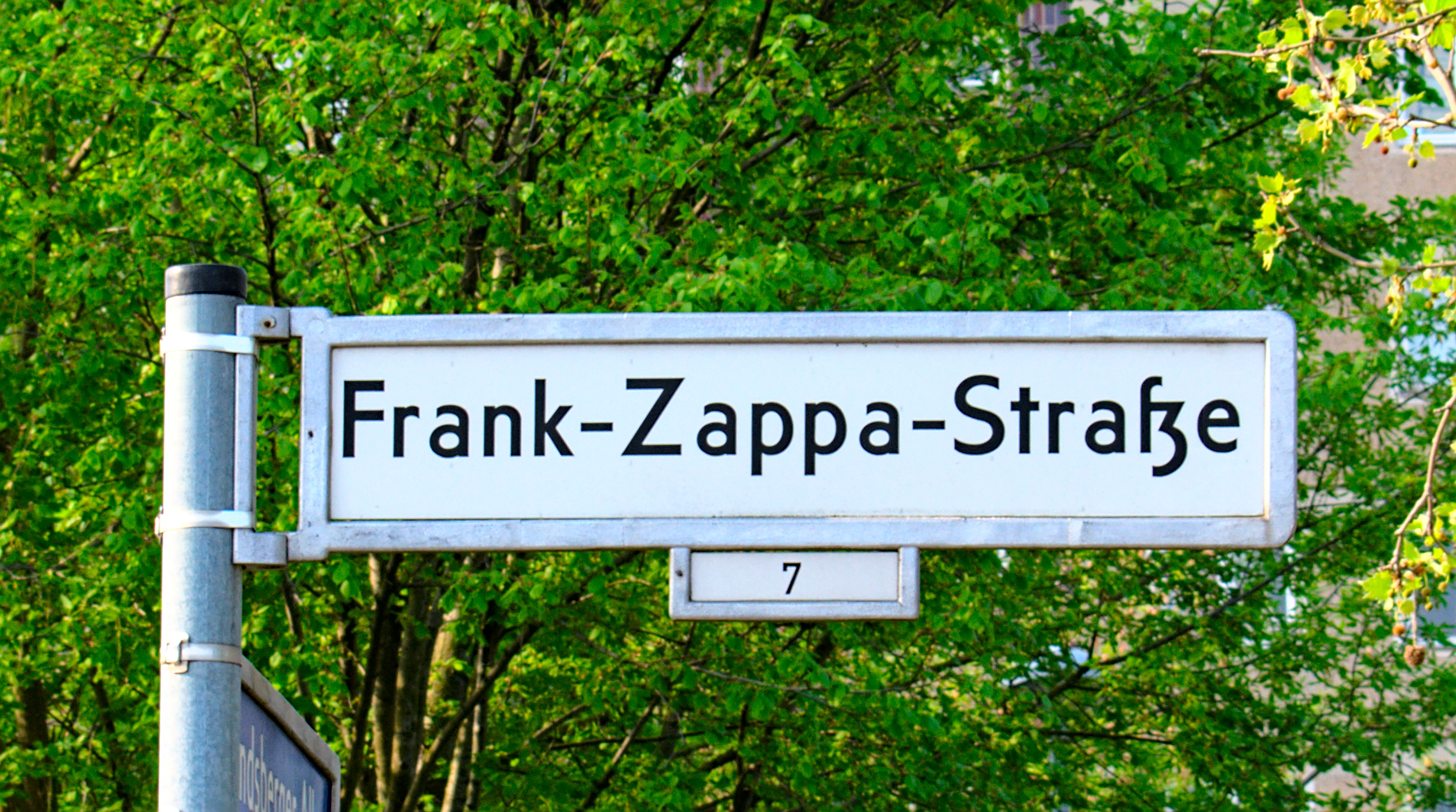
Frank-Zappa-Straße in Berlin

In 2002, a bronze bust was installed in German city Bad Doberan, location of the Zappanale since 1990, an annual music festival celebrating Zappa. At the initiative of musicians community ORWOhaus, the city of Berlin named a street in the Marzahn district "Frank-Zappa-Straße" in 2007. The same year, Baltimore mayor Sheila Dixon proclaimed August 9 as the city's official "Frank Zappa Day" citing Zappa's musical accomplishments as well as his defense of the First Amendment to the United States Constitution.

=== Films ===
Zappa co-directed the 1971 surrealist musical film 200 Motels with Tony Palmer. Featuring the Mothers of Invention, Ringo Starr, Keith Moon, and Theodore Bikel, the film satirizes the disorienting experience of touring as a rock musician.

Zappa directed Baby Snakes (1979), a concert film combining footage from his 1977 Halloween shows in New York City with backstage material and clay animation by Bruce Bickford.

The 2013 documentary Summer 82: When Zappa Came to Sicily, directed by Sicilian filmmaker Salvo Cuccia, revisits Zappa's July 1982 concert at Stadio Communale La Favorita, Palermo, Italy, the final date of his European tour, which was disrupted by clashes with the police. The back cover of The Man from Utopia shows the audience as seen from the stage.

In 2016, Thorsten Schütte directed Eat That Question: Frank Zappa in His Own Words, an archival-footage documentary about Zappa. The film presents Zappa exclusively through interviews and concert footage, tracing his views on music, politics, and the media over the course of his career.

The biographical documentary, released on November 27, 2020, Zappa, directed by Alex Winter, includes previously unreleased footage from Zappa's personal vault, to which he was granted access by the Zappa Family Trust.

== Discography ==
During his lifetime, Zappa released 62 albums. Since 1994, the Zappa Family Trust has released 74 posthumous albums, making a total of 136 albums. The distributor of Zappa's recorded output is Universal Music Enterprises. In June 2022, the Zappa Trust announced that it had sold Zappa's entire catalog to Universal Music, including master tapes, song copyrights and trademarks.

=== Albums ===
- Freak Out! (1966)
- Absolutely Free (1967)
- We're Only in It for the Money (1968)
- Lumpy Gravy (1968)
- Cruising with Ruben & the Jets (1968)
- Mothermania (1969)
- Uncle Meat (1969)
- Hot Rats (1969)
- Burnt Weeny Sandwich (1970)
- Weasels Ripped My Flesh (1970)
- Chunga's Revenge (1970)
- Fillmore East – June 1971 (1971)
- 200 Motels (1971)
- Just Another Band from L.A. (1972)
- Waka/Jawaka (1972)
- The Grand Wazoo (1972)
- Over-Nite Sensation (1973)
- Apostrophe (') (1974)
- Roxy & Elsewhere (1974)
- One Size Fits All (1975)
- Bongo Fury (1975)
- Zoot Allures (1976)
- Zappa in New York (1978)
- Studio Tan (1978)
- Sleep Dirt (1979)
- Sheik Yerbouti (1979)
- Orchestral Favorites (1979)
- Joe's Garage, Act I (1979)
- Joe's Garage, Acts II & III (1979)
- Tinsel Town Rebellion (1981)
- Shut Up 'n Play Yer Guitar (1981)
- Shut Up 'n Play Yer Guitar Some More (1981)
- Return of the Son of Shut Up 'n Play Yer Guitar (1981)
- You Are What You Is (1981)
- Ship Arriving Too Late to Save a Drowning Witch (1982)
- The Man from Utopia (1983)
- Baby Snakes (1983)
- London Symphony Orchestra, Vol. I (1983)
- Boulez Conducts Zappa: The Perfect Stranger (1984)
- Them or Us (1984)
- Thing-Fish (1984)
- Francesco Zappa (1984)
- Old Masters, Box I (1985)
- Frank Zappa Meets the Mothers of Prevention (1985)
- Does Humor Belong in Music? (1986)
- Old Masters, Box II (1986)
- Jazz from Hell (1986)
- London Symphony Orchestra, Vol. II (1987)
- Old Masters, Box III (1987)
- Guitar (1988)
- You Can't Do That on Stage Anymore, Vol. 1 (1988)
- You Can't Do That on Stage Anymore, Vol. 2 (1988)
- Broadway the Hard Way (1988)
- You Can't Do That on Stage Anymore, Vol. 3 (1989)
- The Best Band You Never Heard in Your Life (1991)
- Make a Jazz Noise Here (1991)
- You Can't Do That on Stage Anymore, Vol. 4 (1991)
- You Can't Do That on Stage Anymore, Vol. 5 (1992)
- You Can't Do That on Stage Anymore, Vol. 6 (1992)
- Playground Psychotics (1992)
- Ahead of Their Time (1993)
- The Yellow Shark (1993)

=== Posthumous albums ===
- Civilization Phaze III (1994)
- The Lost Episodes (1996)
- Läther (1996)
- Frank Zappa Plays the Music of Frank Zappa: A Memorial Tribute (1996)
- Have I Offended Someone? (1997)
- Mystery Disc (1998)
- Everything Is Healing Nicely (1999)
- FZ:OZ (2002)
- Halloween (2003)
- Joe's Corsage (2004)
- Joe's Domage (2004)
- Quaudiophiliac (2004)
- Joe's Xmasage (2005)
- Imaginary Diseases (2006)
- The MOFO Project/Object (2006)
- The MOFO Project/Object (fazedooh) (2006)
- Trance-Fusion (2006)
- Buffalo (2007)
- The Dub Room Special! (2007)
- Wazoo (2007)
- One Shot Deal (2008)
- Joe's Menage (2008)
- The Lumpy Money Project/Object (2009)
- Philly '76 (2009)
- Greasy Love Songs (2010)
- Congress Shall Make No Law... (2010)
- Hammersmith Odeon (2010)
- Feeding the Monkies at Ma Maison (2011)
- Carnegie Hall (2011)
- Road Tapes, Venue 1 (2012)
- Understanding America (2012)
- Finer Moments (2012)
- AAAFNRAA: Baby Snakes: The Compleat Soundtrack (2012)
- Road Tapes, Venue 2 (2013)
- A Token of His Extreme (2013)
- Joe's Camouflage (2014)
- Roxy by Proxy (2014)
- Dance Me This (2015)
- 200 Motels: The Suites (2015)
- Roxy The Soundtrack (2015)
- Road Tapes, Venue 3 (2016)
- The Crux of the Biscuit (2016)
- Frank Zappa for President (2016)
- ZAPPAtite: Frank Zappa's Tastiest Tracks (2016)
- Meat Light (2016)
- Chicago '78 (2016)
- Little Dots (2016)
- Halloween 77 (2017)
- The Roxy Performances (2018)
- Zappa in New York 40th Anniversary Edition (2019)
- Orchestral Favorites 40th Anniversary Edition (2019)
- Halloween 73 (2019)
- The Hot Rats Sessions (2019)
- The Mothers 1970 (2020)
- Halloween 81 (2020)
- Zappa: Original Motion Picture Soundtrack (2020)
- Zappa '88: The Last U.S. Show (2021)
- 200 Motels 50th Anniversary Edition (2021)
- The Mothers 1971 (2022)
- Zappa/Erie (2022)
- Zappa '75: Zagreb/Ljubljana (2022)
- Waka/Wazoo (2022)
- Zappa '80: Mudd Club/Munich (2023)
- Funky Nothingness (2023)
- Over-Nite Sensation 50th Anniversary Edition (2023)
- Whisky a Go Go 1968 (2024)
- Apostrophe (') 50th Anniversary Edition (2024)
- Cheaper Than Cheep (2025)
- One Size Fits All 50th Anniversary Edition (2025)
- Halloween 78 (2025)
- Bongo Fury 50th Anniversary Edition (2026)
- Zappa '66 Vol. 1: Live at TTG Studios (2026)
- Freak Out! 60th Anniversary Edition (2026)
- Zoot Allures 50th Anniversary Edition (2026)

== Videography ==
- 1971 – 200 Motels
- 1976 – A Token of His Extreme
- 1979 – Baby Snakes
- 1981 – The Torture Never Stops
- 1982 – The Dub Room Special
- 1985 – Does Humor Belong in Music?
- 1987 – Video from Hell
- 1987 – Uncle Meat
- 1987 – The True Story of Frank Zappa's 200 Motels
- 1987 – The Amazing Mr. Bickford
- 2015 – Roxy The Movie
- 2020 – Zappa
- 2025 – Cheaper Than Cheep

== Tours ==
- July – December 1966: The Mothers of Invention US Tour
- January – December 1967: The Mothers of Invention World Tour (including residency at the Garrick Theatre in New York City during April – September)
- January – December 1968: The Mothers of Invention World Tour
- January – August 1969: The Mothers of Invention World Tour
- February – March 1970: Hot Rats US Tour
- May – December 1970: The Mothers of Invention World Tour
- May – August 1971: The Mothers of Invention North American Tour
- October – December 1971: The Mothers of Invention World Tour
- September – December 1972: The Grand Wazoo (big band, September) / The Petit Wazoo (small band, October – December) World Tour
- February – December 1973: Frank Zappa and The Mothers of Invention World Tour
- January – December 1974: Frank Zappa and The Mothers of Invention World Tour
- April – May 1975: Frank Zappa, Captain Beefheart, and The Mothers of Invention US Tour
- September – December 1975: Frank Zappa and The Mothers of Invention World Tour
- January – March 1976: Frank Zappa and The Mothers of Invention World Tour
- September – December 1976: Frank Zappa North American Tour
- January – February 1977: Frank Zappa European Tour
- September – December 1977: Frank Zappa North American Tour
- January – March 1978: Frank Zappa European Tour
- August – October 1978: Frank Zappa World Tour
- February – March 1979: Frank Zappa European Tour
- March – July 1980: Frank Zappa World Tour
- October – December 1980: Frank Zappa North American Tour
- September – December 1981: Frank Zappa North American Tour
- May – July 1982: Frank Zappa European Tour
- July – December 1984: Frank Zappa World Tour
- February – June 1988: Frank Zappa World Tour

== Books ==
- Them or Us, self-published, 1984, re-published Pinter & Martin Ltd, 2010
- The Real Frank Zappa Book, New York, Poseidon Press, 1989 with Peter Occhiogrosso
- Frank Zappa in His Own Words, Omnibus Press, 1993
- The Real Porn Wars, Gonzo Multimedia, 2014
- The Frank Zappa Guitar Book, Hal Leonard Publishing, 2017 compiled and transcribed by Steve Vai

== See also ==
- List of performers on Frank Zappa records
- Frank Zappa in popular culture

== Notes ==
=== Sources ===
- Day, Nancy (2001). Censorship: or Freedom of Expression?. Twenty-First Century Books. ISBN 978-0822526285.
- Gray, Michael (1984). Mother! Is the Story of Frank Zappa. London: Proteus Books. ISBN 978-0-86276-146-2.
- James, Billy (2000). Necessity Is ...: The Early Years of Frank Zappa & The Mothers of Invention. London: SAF Publishing Ltd. ISBN 978-0-946719-51-8.
- Lowe, Kelly Fisher (2006). The Words and Music of Frank Zappa. Westport: Praeger Publishers. ISBN 978-0-275-98779-4.
- Martin, Bill (2002). Avant Rock: Experimental Music from the Beatles to Björk. Peru, Illinois: Open Court Publishing Company. ISBN 978-0-8126-9500-7.
- MacDonald, Ian (1994). Revolution in the Head: The Beatles' Records and the Sixties. Fourth Estate Ltd. ISBN 978-1-85702-099-1.
- Menn, Don, ed. (1992). Zappa! Guitar Player Presents. San Francisco, California: Miller Freeman. p. 61. ISSN 1063-4533.
  - Groening, Matt. "The Mother of All Interviews. Act II: Matt Groening joins in on the scrutiny of the central decentralizer". In Menn (1992).
- Miles, Barry (2004). Frank Zappa. London: Atlantic Books. ISBN 978-1-84354-092-2.
- Miller, Jim, ed. (1980). The Rolling Stone Illustrated History of Rock & Roll (revised and updated ed.). New York: Random House. ISBN 0-394-51322-3 – via Internet Archive.
- Slaven, Neil (2003). Electric Don Quixote: The Definitive Story of Frank Zappa. London: Omnibus Press. ISBN 978-0-7119-9436-2.
- Romanowski, Patricia; George-Warren, Holly; Pareles, Jon, eds. (1995). "Frank Zappa". The New Rolling Stone Encyclopedia of Rock & Roll (completely revised and updated ed.). Fireside Books. pp. 1111–1114. ISBN 978-0-684-81044-7 – via Internet Archive.
- Walley, David (1980) [1972]. No Commercial Potential. The Saga of Frank Zappa. Then and Now. New York: E. P. Dutton. ISBN 978-0-525-93153-9.
- Watson, Ben (1996). Frank Zappa: The Negative Dialectics of Poodle Play. New York: St. Martin's Griffin. ISBN 978-0-312-14124-0.
- Watson, Ben; Leslie, Esther, eds. (2005). Academy Zappa: Proceedings of the First International Conference of Esemplastic Zappology. Dundrennan, UK: SAF Publishing. ISBN 978-0946719792.
- Watson, Ben (2005). Frank Zappa. The Complete Guide to His Music. London: Omnibus Press. ISBN 978-1-84449-865-9.
- Zappa, Frank; Occhiogrosso, Peter (1989). The Real Frank Zappa Book. New York: Poseidon Press. ISBN 978-0-671-63870-2.
