= The Real Frank Zappa Book =

1989 autobiography by Frank Zappa and Peter Occhiogrosso

- Author: Frank Zappa, Peter Occhiogrosso
- Cover artist: A. West (concept), Jackie Seow-Pracher (design), Greg Gorman (photography)
- Language: English
- Genre: Autobiography, memoir, essays
- Publisher: Poseidon Press (US); Picador (UK)
- Publication date: 1989
- Publication place: United States
- Media type: Hardcover
- Pages: 352 pp
- ISBN: 0-671-70572-5
- OCLC: 43484351

The Real Frank Zappa Book is a 1989 book by American musician Frank Zappa, co-written by Peter Occhiogrosso. It combines elements of autobiography and memoir with essays on political topics.

Zappa appeared on the TV interview show Larry King Live to promote the book. He explained the title by saying he wrote it in response to previous unauthorized books, which he considered to be stupid and exploitative.

== Contents ==
The Real Frank Zappa Book has 19 chapters:

0. INTRODUCTION Book? What book?
1. How Weird Am I, Anyway?
2. There Goes the Neighborhood
3. An Alternative to College
4. Are We Having a Good Time Yet?
5. The Log Cabin
6. Send In the Clowns
7. Drool, Britannia
8. All About Music
9. A Chapter for My Dad
10. The One You've Been Waiting For
11. Sticks & Stones
12. America Drinks and Goes Marching
13. All About Schmucks
14. Marriage (as a Dada Concept)
15. "Porn Wars"
16. Church and State
17. Practical Conservatism
18. Failure
19. The Last Word

== Reviews ==
Vanity Fair wrote of the book, "An autobiography of mostly hilarious stories...fireside war tales from the big bad days of the rockin' sixties...primer of the sonic avant-garde, the book bashes favorite Zappa targets and dashes a few myths about the man."

The New York Post said, "This book belongs in every home".
