= The Guitar World According to Frank Zappa =

Compilation album by Frank Zappa
- Released: June 1987
- Recorded: 1972–1984
- Genre: Instrumental rock
- Length: 32:08
- Label: Barking Pumpkin
- Producer: Frank Zappa

Frank Zappa chronology
| Mothermania (1969) | The Guitar World According to Frank Zappa (1987) | Strictly Commercial (1995) |

Professional ratings
Review scores
| Source | Rating |
|---|---|
| AllMusic | 3/5 stars |

The Guitar World According to Frank Zappa is a 1987 compilation album featuring guitar solos by Frank Zappa. It was issued as a cassette from Guitar World magazine, and has also been available in bootlegged versions as Guitar Hernia and Solo on Guitar. The cassette contains some unique material, including different takes and an excerpt from an unreleased remix of "Revised Music for Guitar and Low-Budget Orchestra" from the Studio Tan album, featuring drum overdubs by Chad Wackerman. The album was released on vinyl in April 2019 as part of Record Store Day.

Similar compilations of Zappa guitar solos include Guitar, Trance-Fusion, Frank Zappa Plays the Music of Frank Zappa: A Memorial Tribute, Shut Up 'n Play Yer Guitar, and One Shot Deal.

== Track listing ==
=== Side one ===
1. "Sleep Dirt" – 3:17
  - From the Sleep Dirt album.
2. "Friendly Little Finger" – 4:17
  - From the Zoot Allures album.
3. Excerpt from "Revised Music for Guitar and Low-Budget Orchestra" – 1:45 [booklet lists incorrectly 2:21]
  - Unreleased remix with drum overdubs from 1984.
4. "Things That Look Like Meat" – 6:06
  - Shortened version of a track later released on the Guitar album.

=== Side two ===
1. "Down in de Dew" – 2:54
  - Later released as part of the Läther box set.
2. "A Solo from Heidelberg" – 5:26
  - Later released on the One Shot Deal album.
3. "A Solo from Cologne" – 5:11
  - Longer version of a track later released on the Guitar album.
4. "A Solo from Atlanta" – 4:05
  - Longer version of a track later released on the Guitar album.
