= List of music directors of the Ojai Music Festival =

This is a complete list of music directors of the Ojai Music Festival, an American festival of classical music held annually in Ojai, California. The list is shown both alphabetically and chronologically.

== Alphabetical listing ==
=== A–E ===
- John Adams: 1993, 2021
- Pierre-Laurent Aimard: 2007
- Leif Ove Andsnes: 2012
- Emanuel Ax: 1997
- George Benjamin: 2010
- Pierre Boulez: 1967, 1970, 1984, 1989, 1992, 1996, 2003
- Aaron Copland: 1957–1958, 1976
- Robert Craft: 1954–1956, 1959, 1982
- Ingolf Dahl: 1957, 1964–1966
- Peter Maxwell Davies: 1988, 1991
- eighth blackbird: 2009
- Emerson String Quartet: 2002

=== F–J ===
- Lukas Foss: 1961–1963, 1979–1980, 1987
- Lawrence Foster: 1968
- Rhiannon Giddens 2023
- John Harbison: 1991
- Daniel Harding: 1997
- Thor Johnson: 1947–1950, 1952–1953

=== K–O ===
- Oliver Knussen: 2005
- Patricia Kopatchinskaja 2018
- Robert LaMarchina: 1968
- Daniel Lewis: 1981, 1983
- Nicholas McGegan: 1988
- Stefan Minde: 1969
- Stephen Mosko: 1986, 1990
- Kent Nagano: 1985, 1986, 1995, 2004

=== P-S ===
- Simon Rattle: 2000
- Edward Rebner: 1949
- David Robertson: 2008
- Esa-Pekka Salonen: 1999, 2001
- Gerhard Samuel: 1971
- Calvin Simmons: 1978
- Robert Spano: 2006
- William Steinberg: 1951
- Igor Stravinsky: 1955–1956

=== T–Z ===
- Henri Temianka: 1960
- Michael Tilson Thomas: 1968, 1969, 1973–1975, 1977, 1994
- Mitsuko Uchida: 1998
- Dawn Upshaw: 2011
- Diane Wittry: 1988
- Michael Zearott: 1969, 1972
- David Zinman: 1998

== Chronological listing ==
=== 1940s ===
- 1947 Thor Johnson
- 1948 Thor Johnson and Edward Rebner
- 1949 Thor Johnson

=== 1950s ===
- 1950 Thor Johnson
- 1951 William Steinberg
- 1952 Thor Johnson
- 1953 Thor Johnson
- 1954 Robert Craft
- 1955 Robert Craft and Igor Stravinsky
- 1956 Robert Craft and Igor Stravinsky
- 1957 Aaron Copland and Ingolf Dahl
- 1958 Aaron Copland
- 1959 Robert Craft

=== 1960s ===
- 1960 Henri Temianka
- 1961 Lukas Foss
- 1962 Lukas Foss
- 1963 Lukas Foss
- 1964 Ingolf Dahl
- 1965 Ingolf Dahl
- 1966 Ingolf Dahl
- 1967 Pierre Boulez
- 1968 Robert LaMarchina, Lawrence Foster and Michael Tilson Thomas
- 1969 Michael Zearott, Stefan Minde and Michael Tilson Thomas

=== 1970s ===
- 1970 Pierre Boulez
- 1971 Gerhard Samuel
- 1972 Michael Zearott
- 1973 Michael Tilson Thomas
- 1974 Michael Tilson Thomas
- 1975 Michael Tilson Thomas
- 1976 Aaron Copland
- 1977 Michael Tilson Thomas
- 1978 Calvin Simmons
- 1979 Lukas Foss

=== 1980s ===
- 1980 Lukas Foss
- 1981 Daniel Lewis
- 1982 Robert Craft
- 1983 Daniel Lewis
- 1984 Pierre Boulez
- 1985 Kent Nagano
- 1986 Kent Nagano and Stephen Mosko
- 1987 Lukas Foss
- 1988 Nicholas McGegan, Peter Maxwell Davies and Diane Wittry
- 1989 Pierre Boulez

=== 1990s ===
- 1990 Stephen Mosko
- 1991 John Harbison and Peter Maxwell Davies
- 1992 Pierre Boulez
- 1993 John Adams
- 1994 Michael Tilson Thomas
- 1995 Kent Nagano
- 1996 Pierre Boulez
- 1997 Emanuel Ax and Daniel Harding
- 1998 Mitsuko Uchida and David Zinman
- 1999 Esa-Pekka Salonen

=== 2000s ===
- 2000 Simon Rattle
- 2001 Esa-Pekka Salonen
- 2002 Emerson String Quartet
- 2003 Pierre Boulez
- 2004 Kent Nagano
- 2005 Oliver Knussen
- 2006 Robert Spano
- 2007 Pierre-Laurent Aimard
- 2008 David Robertson
- 2009 eighth blackbird

=== 2010s ===
- 2010 George Benjamin
- 2011 Dawn Upshaw
- 2012 Leif Ove Andsnes
- 2013 Mark Morris
- 2014 Jeremy Denk
- 2015 Steven Schick
- 2016 Peter Sellars
- 2017 Vijay Iyer
- 2018 Patricia Kopatchinskaja
- 2019 Barbara Hannigan

=== 2020s ===
- 2020 Matthias Pintscher
- 2021 John Adams
- 2022 American Modern Opera Company
- 2023 Rhiannon Giddens
- 2024 Mitsuko Uchida
- 2025 Claire Chase

== See also ==
- Lists of musicians
