= Orchestral Favorites =

- Cover art designed by Gary Panter

Studio album later released with additional live performances by Frank Zappa
- Released: May 4, 1979
- Recorded: September 17–19, 1975
- Venues: Royce Hall, UCLA
- Length: 33:55 LP; 151:22 40th Anniversary 3CD
- Label: DiscReet
- Producer: Frank Zappa

Frank Zappa chronology
Sheik Yerbouti (1979)	Orchestral Favorites (1979)	Joe's Garage (1979)

Alternative cover
- 40th anniversary deluxe edition

Orchestral Favorites is a studio album by American musician Frank Zappa, released in May 1979 on his own DiscReet Records label, distributed by Warner Bros. Records. The album is entirely instrumental and features music performed by the 37-piece Abnuceals Emuukha Electric Symphony Orchestra. It reached number 168 on the Billboard 200 album chart in the United States.

Though it was on his own label, Zappa did not authorize the original 1979 release of this album. Warner did no promotion and it was largely overlooked by fans upon release. At the same time Zappa gave interviews which described his legal problems with Warner and former manager Herb Cohen. The 1991 CD re-release was the first time the album was issued with Zappa's authorization.

When the Zappa Estate reissued the album as a 40th Anniversary Edition in 2019, after Frank's death, additional live recordings with the same musicians were added.

== Recording sessions ==
Zappa's intent was to record a studio album with no audience. The album was sourced from performances recorded September 17–19, 1975 at Royce Hall on the UCLA campus with conductor Michael Zearott. Zappa rehearsed with the group for several days prior to two nights of live concert performances on the 17th and 18th. All of this was to prepare for a final day of recording sessions without the audience on the 19th. The original 1979 album contained only studio performances from the last day of recording.

Zappa funded the entire production cost of about $200,000 from his own pocket, with the high cost due to the large number of musicians hired. The concert ticket sales helped cover a small part of the high production cost, but also allowed fans to enjoy live performances.

Additional recordings from the live concerts were added by the Zappa Estate for the 40th Anniversary Edition in 2019. These tracks are bonus material added after Zappa's death.

"Strictly Genteel" was heard earlier as part of the 200 Motels film and soundtrack album in 1971. "Bogus Pomp" is also made up of themes that were used in 200 Motels. The album contains a new arrangement of "Duke of Prunes", originally on the 1967 album Absolutely Free. There are no overdubs on the original version of the album other than Zappa's electric guitar solo, which he later added to this track.

== History ==
An early version of the album titled Six Things was cut as a demo acetate disc at Kendun Recorders in Burbank, California, in April 1976. This was a different edit which included "Re-Gyptian Strut" and "Music For Guitar & Low Budget Orchestra". These two tracks were not from the Royce Hall sessions and were later cut from the album. The same year Zappa negotiated a distribution deal for an orchestral album with Columbia Masterworks, but the deal fell through when Columbia did not agree to Zappa's terms. Zappa is also known to have played a demo disc of an unreleased orchestral album in 1976 for biographer Barry Miles.

In May 1976, Zappa's relationship with manager and business partner Herb Cohen ended in litigation. They were the co-owners of DiscReet Records which was distributed by Warner Bros. Records. After Zappa released Zoot Allures directly to the Warner Brothers Records label in October 1976, he was still contracted to deliver four more albums to Warner for release on Discreet.

In March 1977, Zappa delivered master tapes for all four albums to Warner to fulfill this contract. Zappa did not receive payment from Warner upon delivery of the tapes, which was a contract violation. In a 1978 radio interview, Zappa listed the four albums delivered to Warner and called this album by the title Zappa Orchestral Favorites.

During a long legal battle, Warner eventually released four Zappa albums on Discreet during 1978 and 1979: Zappa In New York, Studio Tan, Sleep Dirt and Orchestral Favorites. (Since Zappa In New York was configured as a two-LP set, the complete four individual album collection actually contains a total of five full-length LPs.)

Much of the material from these four albums was also edited by Zappa into a four-LP box set called Läther. Zappa announced this album in a mid September 1977 interview where he described it as his "current album". Three tracks from Orchestral Favorites also were included in Läther: "Pedro's Dowry", "Naval Aviation in Art?", and "Duke of Prunes" (titled there as "The Duke of Orchestral Prunes".)

Zappa negotiated a distribution deal with Phonogram Inc. to release Läther as the first release on the Zappa Records label. The album was scheduled for a Halloween October 31, 1977 release date. But Warner claimed ownership of the material and threatened legal action, forcing Zappa to shelve the project.

As Zappa had delivered only the tapes to Warner, Orchestral Favorites was released in May 1979 with no musician or music publishing credits. Warner also commissioned sleeve art by cartoonist Gary Panter, which was not approved by Zappa. The album went out of print when the Warner/Discreet distribution agreement ended in 1982.

== CD editions ==
Zappa chose to issue Orchestral Favorites on Compact Disc on his Barking Pumpkin label in 1991 with Panter's original artwork and added credits. It marked the first time the album was issued with Zappa's authorization. This edition has the stereo orientation of the left and right channels switched from the original release. This CD was reissued in 1995 by Rykodisc and at that time Panter provided additional art.

The Läther album was released on CD in 1996 after Zappa's death.

In 2012, Orchestral Favorites was reissued by the Zappa Records label. Despite new packaging the content is the same as previous CD releases.

The 40th Anniversary Edition, which released in 2019, uses the original stereo orientation as the 1979 LP. This release also adds two discs of previously unreleased live recordings from the 1975 concerts as bonus material.

== Critical reception ==
Professional ratings
Review scores
Source	Rating
AllMusic	3/5 stars
MusicHound Rock: The Essential Album Guide	3/5 stars
The Rolling Stone Album Guide	3/5 stars

The Gazette wrote that "the big arrangements here are in an imaginative melding of 20th century classical music such as Stravinsky, the wacky kitchen sink music of Spike Jones and the electric entanglements of Jimi Hendrix."

== Track listing ==
All tracks are written by Frank Zappa.

Side one
No.	Title	Length
1.	"Strictly Genteel"	7:04
2.	"Pedro's Dowry"	7:42
3.	"Naval Aviation in Art"	1:20
Total length:		16:06

Side two
No.	Title	Length
1.	"Duke of Prunes"	4:20
2.	"Bogus Pomp"	13:29
Total length:		17:49

=== 40th Anniversary Track Listing ===
Disc one - 40th Anniversary Remaster
No.	Title	Length

Disc one - Bonus Track
No.	Title	Length
6.	"Strictly Genteel" (Keyboard OD Version)	7:16
Total length:		41:09

Disc two - The Abnuceals Emuukha Electric Symphony Orchestra - Live At Royce Hall, September 18th, 1975
No.	Title	Length
1.	"Show Start/Bogus Pomp Explained"	6:28
2.	"Bogus Pomp"	15:01
3.	"Revised Music for Low-Budget Symphony Orchestra"	6:54
4.	"The Story Of Pedro's Dowry"	2:10
5.	"Pedro's Dowry"	8:08
6.	"The Story Of Rollo"	3:38
7.	"Rollo"	7:00
Total length:		49:19

Disc three - The Abnuceals Emuukha Electric Symphony Orchestra - Live At Royce Hall, September 18th, 1975
No.	Title	Length
1.	"Black Napkins Instructions"	4:34
2.	"Black Napkins"	7:30
3.	"Dog/Meat"	5:02
4.	"The Players"	1:07
5.	"Naval Aviation In Art?"	2:05
6.	""Another Weirdo Number""	1:04
7.	"Lumpy Gravy (Extract)/Improvisation"	7:01
8.	"Evening At The Hermitage"	3:23
9.	""A Special Guest Artist""	0:43
10.	"Duke Of Prunes"	5:40
11.	""Absolutely Disgusting""	1:43
12.	"The Adventures Of Greggery Peccary"	13:39
13.	"Strictly Genteel"	7:23
Total length:		60:54

== Personnel ==
- Frank Zappa – guitar, vocals
- Ian Underwood, Mike Lang & Ralph Grierson – keyboards
- Bill Mays – Clavinet
- Dave Parlato – bass
- Terry Bozzio – drums
- Emil Richards, Alan Estes, John Bergamo & Tom Raney – percussion
- Mike Altschul – flute and clarinet
- Malcolm McNab, Gene Goe & Ray Poper – trumpet
- Bruce Fowler, Jock Ellis & Kenny Shroyer – trombone
- Dana Hughes – bass trombone
- Don Waldrop – tuba & contrabass trombone
- Dave Shostac – flute, tenor sax
- Gary Foster – 2nd flute (and doubles)
- Ray Reed – flute, alto sax
- Vic Morosco – clarinet, alto sax
- Jay Migliori – clarinet, tenor sax
- Mike Altschul – bass clarinet, baritone sax
- Earle Dumler – oboe, English horn, bass oboe
- John Winter – oboe, English horn
- David Scherr – 2nd oboe, tenor sax
- Joann Caldwell – bassoon
- Bobby Tricarico – bassoon, contrabassoon
- David Duke, Arthur Briegleb, Todd Miller & Bob Henderson – French horn
- Tommy Morgan – harmonica (on "Duke Of Prunes")
- John Wittenberg & Bobby Dubow – violin
- Pamela Goldsmith – viola
- Jerry Kessler – cello
- Lou Anne Neill – harp
- Michael Zearott – conductor

== Charts ==
Album – Billboard (United States)

Year	Chart	Position
1979	Billboard 200	168

Chart (2019)	Peak position
German Albums (Offizielle Top 100)	48
Scottish Albums (Official Charts)	59
Swiss Albums (Schweizer Hitparade)	77
