= The Adventures of Greggery Peccary =

Song by Frank Zappa

from the album Studio Tan
- Released: September 15, 1978
- Recorded: 1972–1976
- Genre: Experimental rock, progressive rock, 20th-century classical
- Length: 21:00
- Label: DiscReet Records
- Songwriter: Frank Zappa
- Producer: Frank Zappa

Studio Tan track listing
- 1. "The Adventures of Greggery Peccary"; 2. "Lemme Take You to the Beach"; 3. "Revised Music for Guitar & Low-Budget Orchestra"; 4. "RDNZL"

"The Adventures of Greggery Peccary" is a musical composition by American Frank Zappa. It originally released as Greggery Peccary on the album Studio Tan in 1978. A slightly different version was also included on the Läther album; while Läther was recorded in 1977, it was officially released in 1996.

An instrumental version appears on the Wazoo CD featuring the original Wazoo ensemble; this version debuted at the Hollywood Bowl on September 10, 1972. The version is in four movements totalling 33.05 minutes on the CD. The song is an epic lasting nearly 21 minutes, mocking the rock opera style and reprising the extended story format used in "Billy the Mountain"; to some extent, it also continues the lengthy adventures outlined in the "Don't Eat the Yellow Snow Suite".

The piece required a large number of personnel to record, and received its basic tracking during The Grand Wazoo and Waka/Jawaka sessions in mid-1972. The piece remained unfinished at the time of release of those two LPs (later that year). Zappa would return to the recording on and off until its completion during the recording sessions for One Size Fits All in 1974. The long interludes of avant-garde classical arrangement that are prevalent in the track made for a much more sophisticated sound than "Billy the Mountain". Nonetheless, Zappa's use of absurdist humor and political commentary remains prominent in this piece.

== Story ==
Greggery Peccary is a small peccary, named after the actor Gregory Peck, and lives among the peccary population, which ranges from Texas to Paraguay and sometimes as far west as Catalina. Peccaries are notable for having a white collar pattern on their fur, but Greggery is part of a "bold new breed" of peccary that also has a wide tie below his collar, distinguishing it as a particularly exceptional swine.

Greggery owns a red Volkswagen and works in the part of the town where the government buildings are kept at a corporation known as "Big Swifty and Associates, Trend-mongers". As the name suggests, their line of work involves conceiving and promoting the many trends and fads within the world using whatever means science has to offer.

Greggery is popular among the air-headed lady stenographers at his company, who are impressed by Greggery and taken by his suave and particular cunning as an employer. Together they sing a song advertising the company's many time-wasting products, thus inspiring Greggery to return to his "ultra-avant, laminated, simulated, replica-mahogany desk" so that he may conceive a new trend, some "THING" to identify with. Guided by heavenly voices, he invents the calendar, a play on the Gregorian calendar introduced by Pope Gregory XIII.

The calendar, upon release, immediately causes chaos, as people suddenly can keep track of time and plan ahead, thus making life aggravatingly mechanical, and also allowing people to discover how old they were. A group of hunchmen, just a few of the "very hip young people" of the world, attack Greggery on the way home from his office one night, enraged at the prospect of birthdays and being aware of their own aging. Greggery is chased by them in his car, and narrowly escapes into a cave in a conveniently placed and nearby mountain.

The hunchmen (and hunchwomen) decide to abandon the chase in favour of a "love-in" and a party ensues among them. Greggery is safe from them, but suddenly discovers that he has parked within no ordinary cave, but the mouth of Billy the Mountain. Billy hacks up boulders and creates new brown clouds as he laughs, suddenly procuring Greggery's interest.

Greggery, unaware that he was parked within Billy the Mountain or that Billy had coughed up the clouds, ponders "who is making those new brown clouds", and makes a phone call to find a "philostopher" for an explanation of the presence of the brown clouds. He is sent to a man named Quentin Robert DeNameland, supposedly "the greatest living philostopher known to mankind", who hosts a group assembly. DeNameland's authenticity as a philostopher is questionable, as he merely proclaims that "time is an affliction" – more specifically, "the eons are closing" – before soliciting for payment for attendance to his assembly.

The adventure closes with Greggery still pondering the presence of the brown clouds, given DeNameland's lack of answers. Cynically he concludes: "If you ask a "philostopher" he'll see that you pays!"

== Variation ==
Zappa played an unreleased early version of this piece from an acetate disc on 99.1 WPLR FM radio in Connecticut on April 23, 1975. In this version Zappa introduces Quentin Robert DeNameland as the greatest living "two-headed philostopher" known to mankind. DeNameLand's philosophical spiel (delivered in Zappa's voice manipulated by a variable speed oscillator, in the style of "Dumb All Over" on You Are What You Is) lasts longer than the Studio Tan or Läther versions. The spiel is accompanied (in a madrigal style) by the musical accompaniment. The following is the entire philosophical speech as noted in the Zappa book, Them or Us.

Well folks as you can see for yourself the way this clock over here is behaving: time is an affliction. Now this might be cause for alarm on a portion of you that's from a certain experience I tend to proclaim: the eons are closing. Now what does this mean precisely to the layman? Simply this: Momentarily the need for the construction of the new light will no longer exist. Of course some of you will think, "Who is he to fell me from this light?" But in all seriousness, ladies and gentlemen, a quick glance at the erratic behavior of the large precision built time delineating apparatus beside me will show that it is perhaps only a few moments now... Look how funny it's going around there! Personally, I find mechanical behavior of this nature to be highly suspicious. When such a device doesn't go normal, the implication of such a behavior bodes not well (if you know what I mean). And quite naturally ladies and gentlemen if the mechanism in question is entrusted with the task of the delineation of time itself and ahh if such a mechanism goes "On the bum".... or the fritz... Well, it spells trouble.

The outro music of Greggery Peccary in this version is also quite different from the official CD released versions. In this version Zappa opts for a tighter, less cluttered bravura ending featuring a cartoonish, cascading marimba part.

Part of the story (Greggery driving his little red Volkswagen and hitting Billy the Mountain) is visualized in Baby Snakes.

== Musical themes ==
The work has some of its origins in a 1969 piece called "Some Ballet Music"; this had been performed several times by Frank Zappa and The Mothers of Invention live on tour but was never officially released on its own in an album until the release of the Beat the Boots box set in 1991. The music was completed in 1972 while Zappa was using a wheelchair during convalescence from multiple injuries. Unlike many of Zappa's previous lyrical compositions, "Greggery Peccary" relies only minimally on repetition.

The story unfolds through lyrics and instrumental passages, e.g., Greggery's drive to work in "his little red Volkswagen" is conveyed by a frenetic musical interlude, after which Greggery delivers the punchline "Boy, it's so hard to find a place to park around here".

The piece is a demonstration of Zappa's skills in composition much more than of his songwriting, which thus identifies it among the Läther canon. There are a few key "songs", however, within the piece as a whole. A miniature jingle accompanies Greggery's introduction and also returns in the piece after a long orchestral interlude taken from "Some Ballet Music", It also includes a piece before the steno pool section entitled "Join the March", previously the intro to "Father O'Blivion". The "Big Swifty" song during the steno pool sequence is a bizarre yet sophisticated jazz piece utilizing irrational rhythm. Greggery's pondering of the new brown clouds (a melody first heard in 1972 on The Grand Wazoo track "For Calvin and His Next Two Hitch-Hikers" appears twice, the latter time as a finale to the whole piece and, in concept, the Läther album).

Billy the Mountain and Ethel's presence in the story are hinted at early on during Greggery's escape, both by their identities as a mountain and tree with eyeballs on it, but also with a brief instrumental quote of the musical theme which accompanies the line "Billy was a mountain, Ethel was a tree growing off of his shoulder" as Greggery drives within the cave.

During the love-in, Zappa overlays several instrumental "pop music" songs with clever segues, explaining that the young people were listening to several different radios at once, all tuned to entirely different channels (similar to the aleatoric piece Imaginary Landscape No. 4 by John Cage).

The song features a variety of musical quotations. When Zappa talks about "slowly aging very hip young people," the music features a quote from Herbie Hancock's "Chameleon". Shortly after, Zappa makes reference to the My Three Sons television theme during the honky-tonk piano section.

== Performances by others ==
Directed by Jonathan Stockhammer, The Adventures of Greggery Peccary was interpreted by the Ensemble Modern on their 2003 album Ensemble Modern Plays Frank Zappa - Greggery Peccary & Other Persuasions.

The piece was also performed at the 25th night of the BBC Proms in 2013 together with "G-spot tornado" from The Yellow Shark in the Royal Albert Hall, the same venue from which Zappa was banned from performing 41 years earlier. The performance featured Mitch Benn as the narrator and Christopher Purves as Greggery, dressed in a pink pig costume.
