= The Crux of the Biscuit =

Compilation album by Frank Zappa
- Released: July 15, 2016
- Recorded: May 24, 1972– June 24, 1973
- Genre: Rock
- Length: 68:59
- Label: Zappa Records; Catalog Number: ZR20020
- Producer: Gail Zappa, Joe Travers

Frank Zappa chronology
| Road Tapes, Venue #3 (2016) | The Crux of the Biscuit (2016) | Frank Zappa For President (2016) |

The Crux of the Biscuit is a compilation album by American musician Frank Zappa, released in July 2016, originally intended to celebrate the 40th anniversary of his album Apostrophe ('). It is the fourth project in a series of 40th Anniversary FZ Audio Documentaries, following MOFO (2006), Lumpy Money (2009) and Greasy Love Songs (2010). The name is based on the same lyric from "Stink-Foot" that Apostrophe (') is based on—"the crux of the biscuit is the apostrophe."

== Track listing ==
All tracks are written by Frank Zappa except where noted.

| No. | Title | Length |
|---|---|---|
| 1. | "Cosmik Debris" | 4:21 |
| 2. | "Uncle Remus (Mix Outtake)" (Zappa, George Duke) | 3:59 |
| 3. | "Down in de Dew (Alternate Mix)" | 3:16 |
| 4. | "Apostrophe' (Mix Outtake)" (Zappa, Jim Gordon, Jack Bruce) | 9:07 |
| 5. | "The Story of Don't Eat the Yellow Snow/St. Alphonzo's Pancake Breakfast" | 2:25 |
| 6. | "Don't Eat the Yellow Snow/St. Alphonzo's Pancake Breakfast (Live)" | 19:26 |
| 7. | "Excentrifugal Forz (Mix Outtake)" | 1:34 |
| 8. | "Energy Frontier (Take 4)" | 3:04 |
| 9. | "Energy Frontier (Take 6 with Overdubs)" | 4:15 |
| 10. | "Energy Frontier (Bridge)" | 8:23 |
| 11. | "Cosmik Debris (Basic Tracks - Take 3)" | 5:11 |
| 12. | "Don't Eat the Yellow Snow (Basic Tracks - Alternate Take)" | 2:12 |
| 13. | "Nanook Rubs It (Basic Tracks - Outtake)" | 0:42 |
| 14. | "Nanook Rubs It (Session Outtake)" | 0:48 |
| 15. | "Frank's Last Words..." | 0:16 |
| Total length: | | 1:08:59 |
