= Studio Tan =

Studio album by Frank Zappa
- Released: September 15, 1978
- Recorded: Summer 1969*, December 1974 – Summer 1976 at The Record Plant, LA; Royce Hall, UCLA; (*) Whitney Studios, Glendale, CA; and Caribou Studios, Nederland, Colorado
- Genre: Jazz fusion
- Length: 40:14
- Label: DiscReet
- Producer: Frank Zappa

Frank Zappa chronology
Zappa in New York (1978)	Studio Tan (1978)	Sleep Dirt (1979)

Studio Tan is the twenty-fourth album by American musician Frank Zappa, released in September 1978 on his own DiscReet Records label, distributed by Warner Bros Records. It reached No. 147 on the Billboard 200 albums chart in the United States.

Though it was on his own label, Zappa did not authorize the original 1978 release of this album. Warner did no promotion and it was largely overlooked by fans upon release. At the same time Zappa gave interviews which described his legal problems with Warner and former manager Herb Cohen. The 1991 CD re-release was the first time the album was issued with Zappa's authorization.

== Recording sessions ==
The basic tracks for "Let Me Take You to the Beach" date from a 1969 session for the album Hot Rats. The rest of the material was recorded between 1974 and 1976. Primary recording locations included the Record Plant in Los Angeles and Caribou Ranch in Colorado.

== History ==
In April 1975 Zappa had a one sided demo acetate disc cut at Kendun Recorders in Burbank, California. This unreleased disc contains "Revised Music for Guitar and Low-Budget Orchestra", a nearly 8 minute version of "200 Years Old" and "Regyptian Strut".

In the notes to the June 1975 album One Size Fits All Zappa mentioned a planned studio album which never appeared. Many fans believe that this was to have included "The Adventures of Greggery Peccary", filling one side, and that the April acetate was to have been the other side. Instead, Zappa opted to release Bongo Fury, a new (mostly) live album in October the same year. This album contained a four-minute edit of the same "200 Years Old" studio recording.

In May 1976, Zappa's relationship with manager and business partner Herb Cohen ended in litigation. Zappa and Cohen's company DiscReet Records was distributed by Warner Bros. Records. When Zappa asked for a reassignment of his contract from DiscReet to Warner in order to advance the possibility of doing special projects without Cohen's involvement, Warner agreed. This led to the October 1976 release of Zoot Allures on Warner. But Warner changed its position following legal action from Cohen.

At this point Zappa was contracted to deliver four more albums to Warner for release on DiscReet. In March 1977 Zappa delivered all four albums to Warner to fulfill his contract. Zappa did not receive payment by Warner upon delivery of the tapes, which was a contract violation.

During a long legal battle between Zappa and Warner the material was eventually released during 1978 and 1979 on four individual albums: Zappa in New York (a two LP set), Studio Tan, Sleep Dirt and Orchestral Favorites.

Much of the material from these four albums was also re-edited by Zappa into a four-LP box set called Läther. Zappa announced this album in a mid September 1977 interview where he described it as his "current album". Zappa negotiated a distribution deal with Phonogram Inc. to release Läther as the first release on the Zappa Records label. The album was scheduled for a Halloween October 31, 1977 release date. But Warner claimed ownership of the material and threatened legal action, preventing the release of Läther and forcing Zappa to shelve the project.

All four tracks on Studio Tan were also included on the shelved Läther album. The songs on side two of Studio Tan are the same as side three of Läther; however, on Läther there are bits of musique concrète and dialog linking the songs. More of these same bits, or "grouts" as Zappa allegedly called them, appear on other albums such as Sheik Yerbouti. Läther was officially released posthumously in 1996.

As Zappa had delivered only the tapes to Warner, Studio Tan was initially released with no musician or songwriting credits. Warner also commissioned sleeve art by cartoonist Gary Panter, which was not approved by Zappa.

When the album was released in September 1978 Zappa said: "I delivered four tapes to Warner last March (1977) as our contract specified and they released this one without telling me. I have received no advance or no royalties from Warner. I consider it a bootleg or pirate album and I'm suing the record company in California."

An excerpt from an otherwise unreleased alternate version of "Revised Music for Guitar and Low-Budget Orchestra" appears on the 1987 compilation The Guitar World According to Frank Zappa, with drum overdubs by Chad Wackerman.

== Release history ==
The 1978 vinyl LP had an early fade out at the end of the track "The Adventures of Greggery Peccary". This shortens the song by about 30 seconds.

Studio Tan was first released on CD in October 1991 on Zappa's Barking Pumpkin label along with the Panter artwork and added credits. On this version the track "The Adventures of Greggery Peccary" was completely remixed. Also, the early fade out on this track was eliminated. The 1991 CD has the songs from side two in a slightly different order than on the 1978 vinyl edition.

Panter would later provide additional art for the album when it was reissued on CD by Ryko in 1995. When the album was reissued on CD in 2012, the complete original 1978 vinyl version was used, while also eliminating the early fade out on "The Adventures of Greggery Peccary".

== Reception ==
Professional ratings
Review scores
Source	Rating
AllMusic	3/5 stars
The Rolling Stone Album Guide	3/5 stars
DownBeat	4.5/5 stars

DownBeat gave the album 4.5 stars. The review says the album is "a well-balanced sampler of Zappa’s unissued ’70s work, including two major instrumental compositions, a hilarious parody of Southern California beach music, and a fully orchestrated, characteristically strange operatic piece . . . Studio Tan may be unauthorized, but, like Zappa’s best work, it’s both emotionally satisfying and a lot of fun. Records like that are rare".

== Track listing ==
All tracks are written by Frank Zappa.

Side one
No.	Title	Length
1.	"Greggery Peccary" (Titled "The Adventures of Greggery Peccary" on CD)	21:12
Total length:		21:12

Side two
No.	Title	Length
1.	"Let Me Take You to the Beach" (Titled "Lemme Take You to the Beach" on CD)	2:44
2.	"Revised Music for Guitar & Low-Budget Orchestra"	7:36
3.	"REDUNZL" (Titled "RDNZL" on CD)	8:12
Total length:		19:02

== Personnel ==
- Frank Zappa – guitar (Tracks A1–B3); vocals (Tracks A1, B1); percussion (Track B2)
- Davey Moire – vocals (Track B1)
- George Duke – keyboards (Tracks A1, B2, B3)
- Eddie Jobson – keyboards & yodeling (Track B1)
- Tom Fowler – bass guitar (Tracks A1, B2)
- Max Bennett – bass guitar (Tracks B1)
- James "Bird Legs" Youman – bass guitar (Tracks B3)
- Chester Thompson – drums (Tracks A1, B2, B3)
- Paul Humphrey – drums (Track B1)
- Don Brewer – bongos (Track B1)
- Ruth Underwood – percussion & synthesizer (Track B3)
- Michael Zearott – conductor (Track B2)
- John Rotella – woodwind instruments (Track B2)
- Mike Altschul – flute (Track B2)
- Ray Reed – flute (Track B2)
- Earle Dumler – oboe (Track B2)
- Victor Morosco – saxophone (Track B2)
- JoAnn Caldwell McNab – bassoon (Track B2)
- Graham Young – trumpet (Track B2)
- Jay Daversa – trumpet (Track B2)
- Malcolm McNab – trumpet (Track B2)
- Bruce Fowler – trombone (Tracks A1, B2)
- Don Waldrop – trombone (Track B2)
- Jock Ellis – trombone (Track B2)
- Dana Hughes – bass trombone (Track B2)
- Murray Adler – violin (Track B2)
- Sheldon Sanov – violin (Track B2)
- Pamela Goldsmith – viola (Track B2)
- Jerry Kessler – cello (Track B2)
- Edward Meares – upright bass (Track B2)
- John Berkman – piano (Track B2)
- Alan Estes – percussion (Track B2)
- Emil Richards – percussion (Track B2)
- Mike D. Stone of the Record Plant – engineer

== Charts ==
Chart (1978)	Peak position
United States (Billboard 200)	147
Australia (Kent Music Report)	92
