= Apostrophe (') =

Album by Frank Zappa

Studio album by Frank Zappa
- Released: March 22, 1974
- Recorded: 1969–1974
- Studios: Electric Lady Studios, New York City; Bolic Sound, Inglewood, California; and Paramount Recording Studios, Hollywood, California
- Genres: Jazz fusion; progressive rock
- Length: 31:51
- Label: DiscReet
- Producer: Frank Zappa

Frank Zappa chronology
Over-Nite Sensation (1973)	Apostrophe (') (1974)	Roxy & Elsewhere (1974)

Frank Zappa solo chronology
Waka/Jawaka (1972)	Apostrophe' (1974)	Zoot Allures (1976)

Singles from Apostrophe'
- 1. "Cosmik Debris" Released: 1974; 2. "Don't Eat the Yellow Snow" Released: 1974

Apostrophe (') is the fifth solo album and eighteenth in total by Frank Zappa, released in March 1974 in both stereo and quadraphonic formats. An edited version of its lead-off track, "Don't Eat the Yellow Snow", was the first of Zappa's three Billboard Top 100 hits, ultimately peaking at number 86. The album itself became the biggest commercial success of Zappa's career, reaching number 10 on the US Billboard 200.

== Overview ==
Apostrophe (') remains Zappa's most commercially successful album in the United States. It was certified gold by the RIAA on April 7, 1976 and peaked at number 10 (a career-high placement) on the Billboard 200 chart in 1974. Continuing from the commercial breakthrough of Over-Nite Sensation (1973), this album is a similar mix of short songs showcasing Zappa's humor and musical arrangements. The record's lyrical themes are often bizarre or obscure, with the exception of "Uncle Remus", which is an extension of Zappa's feelings on racism featured on his earlier song "Trouble Every Day".

== Music ==
The first half of the album loosely follows a continuing theme. "Don't Eat the Yellow Snow" and "Nanook Rubs It" tell of a dream the singer had where he saw himself as an Eskimo named Nanook. It continues into "St. Alfonzo's Pancake Breakfast", which Zappa said was inspired by a television commercial for Imperial margarine.

As was the case with many of Zappa's albums, Apostrophe (') was a melange of archival and recent recordings; side one of Apostrophe (') and the whole Over-Nite Sensation album (released as the immediate predecessor to Apostrophe (') in 1973) were recorded simultaneously during the spring of 1973. The tracks on side two originate from various 1972 sessions with overdubs recorded in 1973 and 1974, except for "Excentrifugal Forz", where the drum track (played by Johnny Guerin) originally came from the Hot Rats sessions in 1969 (along with the bass and drum tracks for "Lemme Take You to the Beach" on Studio Tan (1978) and Läther (1996), although in the case of "Excentrifugal Forz" this is not actually noted in either the album liner notes or official correspondence), and "Stinkfoot", where the basic track, possibly originally known as "The Bass & Drums Song", dates from the Chunga's Revenge sessions in early 1970 as the backing track to a cover of Lightnin' Slim's "I'm A Rolling Stone".

"Apostrophe'" is an instrumental featuring a very fuzzed bass part by Jack Bruce from Cream, and with session drummer Jim Gordon, who was on tour with Zappa's band at the time of the session in November 1972. Zappa stated of Bruce in one interview, "Well, that was just a jam thing that happened because he was a friend of (drummer) Jim Gordon. I found it very difficult to play with him; he's too busy. He doesn't really want to play the bass in terms of root functions; I think he has other things on his mind. But that's the way jam sessions go."

== Release and reception ==
Professional ratings
Review scores
Source	Rating
Allmusic	4.5/5 stars
Christgau's Record Guide	B−
Džuboks	favorable
Rolling Stone	favorable

Village Voice critic Robert Christgau wrote in his review: "Disillusioned acolytes are complaining that he's retreated, which means he's finally made top ten, but that's just his reward for professional persistence. If anything, the satire's improved a little, and the title piece—an improvisation with Jack Bruce, Jim Gordon, and rhythm guitarist Tony Duran—forays into quartet-style jazz-rock. Given Frank's distaste for 'Cosmik Debris' you'd think maybe he's come up with something earthier than Mahavishnu, but given his distaste for sex you can be sure it's more cerebral instead."

Apostrophe (') and Over-Nite Sensation, recorded with the same group of musicians, are the subject of a Classic Albums series documentary from Eagle Rock Entertainment, released on DVD May 1, 2007.

In July 2016, the Zappa Family Trust released a CD of alternate mixes, different takes and live versions of material from Apostrophe (') titled The Crux of the Biscuit. It includes early versions of "Down in De Dew", which Zappa considered for Apostrophe (') but later included on Läther.

On September 13, 2024 album was re-released with new remaster, additional studio material and concert performances from 1974 on six CD and Blu-Ray Audio discs.

== Track listing ==
All tracks are written by Frank Zappa, except "Apostrophe'" co-written with Jim Gordon and Jack Bruce, and "Uncle Remus" co-written with George Duke.

Side one
No.	Title	Length
1.	"Don't Eat the Yellow Snow"	2:07
2.	"Nanook Rubs It"	4:38
3.	"St. Alfonzo's Pancake Breakfast"	1:50
4.	"Father O'Blivion"	2:18
5.	"Cosmik Debris"	4:14
Total length:		14:27

Side two
No.	Title	Length
1.	"Excentrifugal Forz"	1:33
2.	"Apostrophe'"	5:50
3.	"Uncle Remus"	2:44
4.	"Stink-Foot"	6:33
Total length:		17:24

=== 50th Anniversary Edition ===
Disc one - Original 1974 Album – 2024 Remaster + Album Session Bonus Tracks
No.	Title	Length
10.	"Don't Eat the Yellow Snow" (Basic Tracks/Alternate Take)	2:12
11.	"Nanook Rubs It" (Basic Tracks/Outtake)	0:43
12.	"Nanook Rubs It" (Session Outtake)	0:49
13.	"Cosmik Debris" (Basic Tracks - Take 3)	5:10
14.	"Excentrifugal Forz" (Mix Outtake)	1:34
15.	"Apostrophe (')" (Mix Outtake)	9:07
16.	"Uncle Remus" (Mix Outtake)	3:59
17.	"Apostrophe'" (Unedited Master/2024 Mix)	11:07
18.	"Uncle Remus" (Piano and Vocal Mix 2024)	3:20

Disc two - Bonus Concert 1 – Colorado Springs, CO, 21 March 1974
No.	Title	Length
1.	"Show start/Band Intros"	2:05
2.	"Village of the Sun"	5:15
3.	"Echidna's Arf (Of You)"	3:52
4.	"Don't You Ever Wash That Thing?"	8:53
5.	"Babbette"	5:03
6.	"Approximate"	4:13
7.	"Cosmik Debris"	10:28
8.	"Pygmy Twylyte"	6:24
9.	"The Idiot Bastard Son"	2:14
10.	"Cheepnis"	5:20
11.	"Montana"	6:17
12.	"Dupree's Paradise Intro"	8:03

Disc three - Bonus Concert 1 – Colorado Springs, CO, 21 March 1974 (Continued)
No.	Title	Length
1.	"Dupree's Paradise"	19:05
2.	"Is There Anything Good Inside of You?"	11:03
3.	"Florentine Pogen"	4:19
4.	"Kung Fu"	1:08
5.	"Penguin in Bondage"	6:38
6.	"T'Mershi Duween"	1:51
7.	"The Dog Breath Variations"	1:41
8.	"Uncle Meat"	4:51
9.	"RDNZL"	4:49
10.	"Medley: King Kong/Chunga's Revenge/Son of Mr. Green Genes"	9:16

Disc four - Early 1974 Bonus Live Track + Bonus Concert #2 – Dayton, Ohio, Hara Arena, 20 November 1974
No.	Title	Length
1.	"Inca Roads" (Salt Lake City, Utah - 3-18-74 - Terrace Ballroom)	14:00
2.	"Tush Tush Tush (A Token of My Extreme)"	1:28
3.	"Stink-Foot"	6:45
4.	"RDNZL"	10:28
5.	"Village of the Sun"	4:44
6.	"Echidna's Arf (Of You)"	3:22
7.	"Don't You Ever Wash That Thing?"	6:25
8.	"Penguin in Bondage"	9:31
9.	"T'Mershi Duween"	3:46
10.	"The Dog Breath Variations"	1:36
11.	"Uncle Meat"	2:18
12.	"Building a Girl"	2:56

Disc five - Dayton, OH Show, 20 November 1974 (Continued) + Bonus
No.	Title	Length
1.	"Dinah-Moe Humm"	9:04
2.	"Camarillo Brillo"	4:08
3.	"Pygmy Twylyte"	9:56
4.	"Room Service"	3:15
5.	"Tush Tush Tush (End Vamp)"	1:30
6.	"Don't Eat the Yellow Snow"	2:52
7.	"Nanook Rubs It"	6:25
8.	"St. Alfonzo's Pancake Breakfast"	2:09
9.	"Father O'Blivion"	3:14
10.	"Apostrophe TV Ad"	0:27
11.	"Don't Eat the Yellow Snow - Single Edit"	3:37
12.	"Goteborg GTR"	5:10
13.	"Approximate"	2:23
14.	"…the poodle bites…"	1:16

== Personnel ==
=== Musicians ===
- Frank Zappa – vocals, guitar, bass, bouzouki
- Sal Marquez – trumpet
- Ian Underwood – saxophone
- Napoleon Murphy Brock – saxophone
- Bruce Fowler – trombone
- Tom Fowler – bass guitar
- Don "Sugarcane" Harris – violin
- Jean-Luc Ponty – violin
- Ruth Underwood – percussion, vibraphone
- George Duke – keyboards
- Tony Duran – rhythm guitar
- Harper May – bass guitar
- Erroneous (Alex Dmochowski) – bass guitar
- Jack Bruce – bass on "Apostrophe'"
- Ralph Humphrey – drums (side one)
- Johnny Guerin – drums on "Excentrifugal Forz"
- Aynsley Dunbar – drums on "Uncle Remus" and "Stink-Foot"
- Jim Gordon – drums on "Apostrophe"

=== Back-up vocals ===
- Lynn (Linda Sims of The Ikettes)
- Debbie (Debbie Wilson of The Ikettes)
- Tina Turner (uncredited)
- Robert "Frog" Camarena
- Ruben Ladron de Guevara
- Ray Collins
- Sue Glover
- Kerry McNabb
- George Duke
- Napoleon Murphy Brock

=== Production staff ===
- Cal Schenkel – artwork, graphic design
- Barry Keene – engineer
- Kerry McNabb – engineer, remixing
- Ferenc Dobronyi – cover design
- Bob Ludwig – technician
- Paul Hof – technician
- Oscar Kergaives – technician
- Brian Krokus – technician
- Mark Aalyson – photography
- Bob Stone – transfers, digital remastering
- Steve Desper – engineer
- Terry Dunavan – engineer
- Zach Glickman – marketing
- Bob Hughes – engineer

== Charts ==
1974 chart performance for Apostrophe (')
Chart (1974)	Peak position
Australian Albums (Kent Music Report)	71
Norwegian Albums (VG-lista)	6
US Billboard 200	10

2024 chart performance for Apostrophe (')
Chart (2024)	Peak position
Austrian Albums (Ö3 Austria)	31
Belgian Albums (Ultratop Flanders)	30
Belgian Albums (Ultratop Wallonia)	169
Croatian International Albums (HDU)	21
Dutch Albums (Album Top 100)	59
German Albums (Offizielle Top 100)	7
Scottish Albums (Official Charts)	22
Swiss Albums (Schweizer Hitparade)	30
UK Rock & Metal Albums (Official Charts)	3

2026 chart performance for Apostrophe (')
Chart (2026)	Peak position
Greek Albums (IFPI)	34
