= Disco Boy =

Disco Boy may refer to:

- "Disco Boy" (song), a 1976 song by Frank Zappa
- Disco Boy (film), a 2023 drama film

== See also ==
- The Disco Boys, a German DJ duo
