= Frank Zappa Plays the Music of Frank Zappa: A Memorial Tribute =

- Cover art designed by Matt Groening

Compilation album by Frank Zappa
- Released: October 1996
- Recorded: 1974–1979
- Genre: Progressive rock; art rock; hard rock; instrumental rock
- Length: 54:04
- Label: Barking Pumpkin
- Producer: Dweezil Zappa

Frank Zappa chronology
Läther (1996)	Frank Zappa Plays the Music of Frank Zappa: A Memorial Tribute (1996)	Have I Offended Someone? (1997)

Professional ratings
Review scores
Source	Rating
Allmusic	4/5 stars

Frank Zappa Plays the Music of Frank Zappa: A Memorial Tribute is a posthumous album by Frank Zappa.

According to the liner notes, Frank's son Dweezil talked with his father shortly before Frank's death about the songs Frank had written that he would consider to be his "signature" tunes. These were "Zoot Allures", "Black Napkins" and "Watermelon in Easter Hay". The album compiles the original album versions of these three pieces, along with an alternate, live take of each, and the track "Merely a Blues in A".

This release is similar in style to works such as Guitar, Trance-Fusion, Shut Up 'n Play Yer Guitar and The Guitar World According to Frank Zappa.

The album cover was designed by Matt Groening.

== Track listing ==
All tracks are written by Frank Zappa.

No.	Title	Recording date and location	Length
1.	"Black Napkins"	1975 11 22 Ljubljana YU	7:10
2.	"Black Napkins" (Zoot Allures album version)	1976 02 03 Osaka JP	4:15
3.	"Zoot Allures"	1976 02 05 Tokyo JP	15:45
4.	"Merely a Blues in A"	Paris in 1974	7:27
5.	"Zoot Allures" (Zoot Allures album version)		4:05
6.	"Watermelon in Easter Hay"	1978 02 24 Eppelheim DE	6:42
7.	"Watermelon in Easter Hay" (Joe's Garage album version)		8:42

== Personnel ==
- Frank Zappa – lead guitar, vocals
- Norma Bell – vocals
- Napoleon Murphy Brock – tenor saxophone, vocals
- Adrian Belew – rhythm guitar
- Warren Cuccurullo – rhythm guitar
- George Duke – keyboards, vocals
- André Lewis – keyboards, vocals
- Tommy Mars – keyboards
- Peter Wolf – keyboards
- Arthur Barrow – bass
- Roy Estrada – bass, vocals
- Tom Fowler – bass
- Patrick O'Hearn – bass
- Dave Parlato – bass
- Terry Bozzio – drums
- Vinnie Colaiuta – drums-optometric abandon
- Chester Thompson – drums
- Ed Mann – percussion
- Ruth Underwood – marimba
- Lou Anne Neill – harp
