= Erroneous =

Erroneous may refer to:

- Erroneous program, a program whose semantics are not well-defined, but where the language implementation is not obligated to signal an error.
- "Erroneous rendition", a euphemism used by the U.S. Central Intelligence Agency (CIA) for the forcible abduction and transfer to the U.S. of a target in another legal jurisdiction
- Erroneous, a pseudonym used by bassist Alex Dmochowski, so credited on the Frank Zappa albums Waka/Jawaka, The Grand Wazoo and Apostrophe (')

== See also ==
- Error
