= Zappa in New York =

Live album by Frank Zappa
- Released: March 3, 1978
- Recorded: December 26–29, 1976
- Venues: Palladium, NYC
- Genres: Jazz fusion; comedy rock; hard rock; progressive rock
- Length: 70:04 (1977 withdrawn version); 59:47 (1978 edited version); 101:53 (1991 CD version); 99:42 (2019 40th Anniversary 3LP); 301:33 (2019 40th Anniversary 5CD)
- Label: DiscReet
- Producer: Frank Zappa

Frank Zappa chronology
Zoot Allures (1976)	Zappa in New York (1978)	Studio Tan (1978)

Alternative cover
- 40th Anniversary Deluxe Edition

Professional ratings
Review scores
Source	Rating
AllMusic	4/5 stars

Zappa in New York is a double live album by Frank Zappa released on his own DiscReet Records label, distributed by Warner Bros. Records. It was recorded in December 1976 at a series of concerts at the Palladium in New York City.

The album was scheduled for release in mid-1977 and briefly released in October that year before it was almost immediately recalled. An edited version was widely reissued in March 1978. The album reached #57 on the Billboard 200 albums chart in the United States.

Though it was on his own label, Zappa did not authorize the 1977 or 1978 releases of this album and Warner did no promotion. At the same time Zappa gave interviews which described his legal problems with Warner and former manager Herb Cohen. The 1991 CD re-release was the first time the album was issued with Zappa's authorization.

== Music ==
The album features a variety of rock and jazz-rock tracks. "Sofa" had appeared in a different arrangement on a previous Zappa record and "Big Leg Emma" was a non-album B-side from 1967, while the other songs were entirely new. Backing musicians include a full horn section, containing members of the Saturday Night Live band, including Lou Marini and Tom Malone, as well as the Brecker Brothers. In addition, Don Pardo was invited by Zappa to the Palladium concerts, and he provides introductory narrations to "Punky's Whips" and "The Illinois Enema Bandit" (Michael H. Kenyon). After the December 1976 live performances Zappa spent time in the studio in early 1977 adding a significant number of overdubs, including additional percussion parts from Ruth Underwood, John Bergamo, and Ed Mann.

== History ==
The DiscReet label was co-owned by Zappa and his manager Herb Cohen and distributed by Warner Bros. Records. Zappa delivered four new individual albums to Warner for release on DiscReet in March 1977 to complete his contract. According to the contract Warner was required to pay Zappa $60,000 per album ($240,000 total) and release the recordings in the United States within six weeks. However, Warner failed to follow through on these terms.

The four individual albums delivered in March 1977 were Zappa in New York, Studio Tan, Sleep Dirt and Orchestral Favorites. Since Zappa in New York was configured as a two-LP set, the complete four-album collection contains a total of five full LPs.

Warner later scheduled the release of Zappa in New York on DiscReet in mid-1977. A "Dateline Burbank" advertisement in the June 30, 1977 issue of Rolling Stone magazine described the release of the album as "imminent". A few uncensored copies appeared by late 1977 but the album was quickly pulled from stores in November. Zappa objected to the release at this time and sued Warner. He also claimed that Warner first began to manufacture the album only when they heard he had negotiated to release the recordings with a competing company. The full eleven-song uncensored 1977 version of the album has never been officially re-issued.

Much of the material from these four individual albums was also edited by Zappa into a four-LP box set called Läther. Zappa announced this album in a mid September 1977 interview where he described it as his "current album". Zappa negotiated a distribution deal with Phonogram Inc. to release Läther as the first release on the Zappa Records label. The album was scheduled for a Halloween October 31, 1977 release date. But Warner claimed ownership of the material and threatened legal action, preventing the release of Läther and forcing Zappa to shelve the project.

Before re-issuing Zappa in New York in March 1978, Warner Bros. Records removed one of the longest songs, "Punky's Whips". The remaining songs were re-sequenced by moving "Big Leg Emma" from side two to side one. "Titties & Beer" was also edited to remove references to Punky Meadows, a member of the American glam rock band Angel. This cut more than 11 minutes from the album and reduced the playing time of side one to a mere ten minutes. The censorship and editing were done by Warner in violation of Zappa's contract.

Several of the songs on this album were also included on the shelved album Läther, which finally released officially in 1996. These songs are "The Illinois Enema Bandit", "The Black Page #1", "Big Leg Emma", "Titties & Beer”, “Punky's Whips", "The Purple Lagoon" and "I Promise Not to Come in Your Mouth" (under the title "Läther".)

== CD release, 1991 ==
Zappa re-issued Zappa in New York as a double CD album in 1991 with the addition of four bonus tracks ("Cruisin' for Burgers", "Punky's Whips", "I'm the Slime", "The Torture Never Stops"). The CD reissue was remixed to feature guitar overdubs that were recorded in 1976 but not included in previous releases. The CD reissue contained an alternate recording of "Punky's Whips" and the full recording of "Titties & Beer". On this version, Pardo also delivers a verse of "I'm the Slime" (he did the same for Zappa's 1976 Saturday Night Live appearance).

== 40th Anniversary releases, 2019 ==
For the 40th anniversary in 2019 there were two re-issues: a three-LP set and a five-CD deluxe box. The three-LP set combines the 1978 two-LP release with a bonus LP of vault material. The five-CD set was packaged in an embossed tin box shaped to look like a NYC street manhole cover. The five-CD box claims to contain the original uncensored 1977 vinyl version with eleven songs, but it only does so if one counts the bonus material, as "Chrissy Puked Twice" contains the entirety of what became "Titties & Beer," and what is labeled the "Unused Version" of "Punky's Whips" on disc 5 is the version that was supposed to be released in 1977. This material forms part of more than three hours of bonus live performances from the four nights at the Palladium; also included is a replica of a Palladium show ticket.

== Track listing ==
=== Withdrawn 1977 LP version ===
Side one
No.	Title	Length
1.	"Titties & Beer"	5:22
2.	"I Promise Not to Come in Your Mouth"	3:50
3.	"Punky's Whips"	10:51
Total length:		20:03

Side two
No.	Title	Length
1.	"Sofa"	3:15
2.	"Manx Needs Women"	1:40
3.	"The Black Page Drum Solo/Black Page #1"	4:06
4.	"Big Leg Emma"	2:17
5.	"Black Page #2"	5:25
Total length:		16:36

Side three
No.	Title	Length
1.	"Honey, Don't You Want a Man Like Me?"	4:15
2.	"The Illinois Enema Bandit"	12:31
Total length:		16:46

Side four
No.	Title	Length
1.	"The Purple Lagoon"	16:57
Total length:		16:57

=== Edited 1978 LP version ===
Side one
No.	Title	Length
1.	"Titties & Beer"	5:01
2.	"I Promise Not to Come in Your Mouth"	3:50
3.	"Big Leg Emma"	2:17
Total length:		11:08

Side two
No.	Title	Length
1.	"Sofa"	3:15
2.	"Manx Needs Women"	1:40
3.	"The Black Page Drum Solo/Black Page #1"	4:06
4.	"Black Page #2"	5:25
Total length:		14:26

Side three
No.	Title	Length
1.	"Honey, Don't You Want a Man Like Me?"	4:15
2.	"The Illinois Enema Bandit"	12:31
Total length:		16:46

Side four
No.	Title	Length
1.	"The Purple Lagoon"	16:57
Total length:		16:57

=== 1991 2-CD version ===
Disc one
No.	Title	Length
1.	"Titties & Beer"	7:36
2.	"Cruisin' for Burgers"	9:12
3.	"I Promise Not to Come in Your Mouth"	3:32
4.	"Punky's Whips"	10:51
5.	"Honey, Don't You Want a Man Like Me?"	4:12
6.	"The Illinois Enema Bandit"	12:41
Total length:		48:04

Disc two
No.	Title	Length
1.	"I'm the Slime"	4:24
2.	"Pound for a Brown"	3:41
3.	"Manx Needs Women"	1:51
4.	"The Black Page Drum Solo/Black Page #1"	3:50
5.	"Big Leg Emma"	2:17
6.	"Sofa"	2:56
7.	"Black Page #2"	5:36
8.	"The Torture Never Stops"	12:35
9.	"The Purple Lagoon/Approximate"	16:40
Total length:		53:50

=== 2019 40th Anniversary vinyl pressing ===
Side one
No.	Title	Length
1.	"Titties & Beer"	5:01
2.	"I Promise Not to Come in Your Mouth"	3:31
3.	"Big Leg Emma"	2:17
Total length:		10:49

Side two
No.	Title	Length
1.	"Sofa"	3:16
2.	"Manx Needs Women"	1:34
3.	"The Black Page Drum Solo/Black Page #1"	4:06
4.	"Black Page #2"	5:42
Total length:		14:38

Side three
No.	Title	Length
1.	"Honey, Don't You Want a Man Like Me?"	4:16
2.	"The Illinois Enema Bandit"	12:41
Total length:		16:57

Side four
No.	Title	Length
1.	"The Purple Lagoon"	16:57
Total length:		16:57

Side five
No.	Title	Length
1.	"Black Napkins"	10:56
2.	"Cruisin’ for Burgers" (1977 Mix)	9:08
Total length:		20:04

Side six
No.	Title	Length
1.	"The Black Page #2" (Piano Version)	3:14
2.	"I Promise Not to Come in Your Mouth" (Alternate Version)	3:55
3.	"Punky's Whips" (Unused Version)	10:55
4.	"The Black Page #1" (Piano Version)	2:13
Total length:		20:17

=== 2019 40th Anniversary 5-CD box set ===
Disc one (claims to be the 1977 version, but actually the edited 1978 version)
No.	Title	Length
1.	"Titties & Beer"	5:01
2.	"I Promise Not to Come in Your Mouth"	3:31
3.	"Big Leg Emma"	2:17
4.	"Sofa"	3:16
5.	"Manx Needs Women"	1:34
6.	"The Black Page Drum Solo/Black Page #1"	4:06
7.	"Black Page #2"	5:32
8.	"Honey, Don't You Want a Man Like Me?"	4:16
9.	"The Illinois Enema Bandit"	12:41
10.	"The Purple Lagoon"	17:12
Total length:		59:26

Disc two - Bonus Concert Performances
No.	Title	Length
1.	""The Most Important Musical Event of 1976""	3:23
2.	"Peaches en Regalia"	3:04
3.	"The Torture Never Stops"	11:27
4.	"The Black Page #2"	5:15
5.	"Punky’s Whips Intro"	1:25
6.	"Punky’s Whips"	11:35
7.	"I Promise Not to Come in Your Mouth"	4:03
8.	"Honey, Don't You Want a Man Like Me?"	4:12
9.	"The Illinois Enema Bandit"	15:41
10.	""Two for the Price of One""	1:51
11.	"Penis Dimension"	3:08
12.	"Montana"	8:04
Total length:		73:08

Disc three - Bonus Concert Performances
No.	Title	Length
1.	"America Drinks"	4:52
2.	""Irate Phone Calls""	1:37
3.	"Sofa #2"	3:04
4.	""The Moment You’ve All Been Waiting For""	0:58
5.	"I'm the Slime"	5:38
6.	"Pound for a Brown"	4:50
7.	"Terry's Solo"	2:47
8.	"The Black Page Drum Solo/Black Page #1"	3:53
9.	"Big Leg Emma"	2:19
10.	""Jazz Buffs and Buff-etts""	1:51
11.	"The Purple Lagoon"	17:00
12.	"Find Her Finer"	5:22
13.	"The Origin of Manx"	1:48
14.	"Manx Needs Women"	1:37
15.	"Chrissy Puked Twice"	6:40
16.	"Cruisin’ For Burgers"	9:56
Total length:		74:12

Disc four - Bonus Concert Performances
No.	Title	Length
1.	"The Purple Lagoon/Any Kind of Pain"	4:25
2.	""The Greatest New Undiscovered Group in America""	2:18
3.	"Black Napkins"	28:33
4.	"Dinah-Moe Humm"	6:18
5.	"Finale"	4:40
Total length:		46:14

Disc five - Bonus Vault Content
No.	Title	Length
1.	"The Black Page #2" (Piano Version)	3:16
2.	"I Promise Not to Come in Your Mouth" (Alternate Version)	3:55
3.	"Chrissy Puked Twice"	8:16
4.	"Cruisin’ for Burgers" (1977 Mix)	9:02
5.	"Black Napkins"	10:53
6.	"Punky’s Whips" (Unused Version)	10:58
7.	"The Black Page #1" (Piano Version)	2:13
Total length:		48:33

=== Musicians ===
- Frank Zappa – conductor, lead guitar, vocals, producer; guitar overdubs
- Ray White – rhythm guitar, vocals
- Eddie Jobson – keyboards, violin, vocals
- Patrick O'Hearn – bass guitar, vocals
- Terry Bozzio – drums, vocals
- Ruth Underwood – percussion, synthesizer, and various humanly impossible overdubs
- Lou Marini – alto sax, flute
- Mike Brecker – tenor sax, flute
- Ronnie Cuber – baritone sax, clarinet
- Randy Brecker – trumpet
- Tom Malone – trombone, trumpet, piccolo
- Don Pardo – sophisticated narration
- David Samuels – timpani, vibes
- John Bergamo – percussion overdubs
- Ed Mann – percussion overdubs
- Lou Anne Neill – osmotic harp overdub

=== Production staff ===
- Frank Zappa – production
- Bob Liftin – NYC live remote engineer
- Davey Moire – NYC live concert mix, studio engineer (overdubs)
- Rick Smith – studio engineer (overdubs)
- John Williams – package design
- Dweezil Zappa – cover photo
- Gail Zappa – other photos

== Charts ==
Chart (1978)	Peak position
United States (Billboard 200)	57
Australia (Kent Music Report)	74
