= Uncle Remus (song) =

Song written by Frank Zappa and George Duke

Song by Frank Zappa

from the album Apostrophe (')
- Released: March 1974
- Recorded: May 24, 1972–c. 1973
- Genre: Rock
- Length: 2:50
- Label: DiscReet
- Songwriters: Frank Zappa; George Duke
- Producer: Frank Zappa

"Uncle Remus" is a song written by American musicians Frank Zappa and George Duke, and first released on Zappa's 1974 album Apostrophe ('). The name of the song is derived from Uncle Remus, a fictional character found in works by writer Joel Chandler Harris. The song has been said to reflect Zappa's feelings about racism and the civil rights movement, themes which had previously been explored in his earlier song "Trouble Every Day".

== Composition ==
The lyrics of "Uncle Remus" have been said to reflect Zappa's thoughts regarding racial tensions in the United States, including the civil rights movement and civil rights work that has not been done. It has also been described as an extension of Zappa's feelings on racism featured on his earlier song "Trouble Every Day". The lyrics, "Just keep your nose, to the grindstone they say. Will that redeem us, Uncle Remus", questions whether despite their best efforts, if racial equality can ever be achieved. Author Ben Watson called the song "a gentle reprimand, noting how protest was being abandoned for fashion", citing Zappa's mention of growing a "'fro", along with water from fire hoses used in protests having the potential to harm "sharp" clothes. The song's lyrics also refer to lawn jockeys, statuettes that often depicted black figures with exaggerated features. Zappa sings about targeting jockeys on the lawns of "rich people" as a form of protest in Beverly Hills, suggesting a connection between class and race. George Duke is often credited as contributing to the song's distinctly Gospel inspired sound. Additionally, "Uncle Remus" is described as having Jazz and Blues influences.

== Release ==
"Uncle Remus" first appeared on Zappa's eighteenth album, Apostrophe ('), released in March 1974. An extended mix of the song, "Uncle Remus (Mix Outtake)", was included on the 2016 Zappa compilation album The Crux of the Biscuit. Duke released an alternate version of the song with a more gospel-like arrangement on his 1975 album The Aura Will Prevail. Another alternate version, this time instrumental, was released on Zappa's 2022 boxset Waka/Wazoo.

== Personnel ==
- Frank Zappa – vocals, lead guitar
- George Duke – piano
- Tom Fowler – bass guitar
- Aynsley Dunbar – drums
