= Over-Nite Sensation =

- original issue cover

Studio album by The Mothers
- Released: September 7, 1973
- Recorded: March 19–June 1, 1973
- Studios: Bolic Sound (Inglewood, CA) and Whitney Studios (Glendale, CA)
- Genres: Progressive rock, funk rock
- Length: 34:37
- Label: DiscReet
- Producer: Frank Zappa

Frank Zappa chronology
The Grand Wazoo (1972)	Over-Nite Sensation (1973)	Apostrophe (') (1974)

The Mothers of Invention chronology
The Grand Wazoo (1972)	Over-Nite Sensation (1973)	Roxy & Elsewhere (1974)

Singles from Over-Nite Sensation
- 1. "I'm the Slime" Released: 1973 (Alternative Mix)

Over-Nite Sensation is the twelfth album by The Mothers of Invention (credited as The Mothers), and the seventeenth album overall by Frank Zappa, released in September 1973. It was Zappa's first album released on his DiscReet label.

== Recording ==
Frank Zappa wanted to use backup singers on the songs "I'm the Slime", "Dirty Love", "Zomby Woof", "Dinah-Moe Humm" and "Montana". His road manager suggested The Ikettes, and Ike & Tina Turner were contacted. Ike Turner insisted that Zappa pay the singers, including Tina Turner, no more than $25 per song (equivalent to $180 in 2025). However, an invoice shows that they were actually paid $25 per hour, and in total $187.50 each for 7 1/2 hours of work (equivalent to $1,360 in 2025). During the recording sessions at Bolic Sound, Tina brought Ike into the studio to hear the highly difficult middle section of "Montana" which had taken the Ikettes a few days to learn and master. Ike listened to the tape and responded "What is this shit?" before leaving the studio. Ike later insisted that Zappa not credit the Ikettes on the released album. Zappa confirmed in 1973 that Tina and the Ikettes did appear on the record even though he was "not supposed" to say so.

The recording sessions which produced Over-Nite Sensation also produced Zappa's followup, Apostrophe (') (1974), released as a solo album rather than a Mothers of Invention release.

== Music and lyrics ==
Much of the album's lyrics deal with sex. For example, "Dinah-Moe Humm" describes a woman who wagers that the narrator can't give her an orgasm and is ultimately aroused by watching him have sex with her sister.

On other topics, "I'm the Slime" criticizes television, and the playful and absurd "Montana" describes moving to Montana to grow dental floss.

The music of Over-Nite Sensation draws from rock, jazz and pop music. "Zomby Woof" has been described as a "heavy metal hybrid of Louis Jordan and Fats Waller".

== Artwork ==
The cover was done by Dave McMacken as somewhat in the vein of Salvador Dalí's surreal imagery depicting a two-headed man sitting on a waterbed in a Holiday Inn hotel room surrounded by various objects like a Mothers backstage pass and a television set showing Zappa's face with slime oozing out of it.

== Reception ==
Professional ratings
Review scores
Source	Rating
AllMusic	4.5/5 stars
Robert Christgau	(C)
DownBeat	3.5/5 stars

The album initially received mixed reviews due to its lyrical content, which some critics found puerile. Rolling Stone magazine disliked the album, describing Zappa as a "spent force", and saying that his best work had been recorded with earlier incarnations of the Mothers. New Musical Express said that the album was "not one of Frank's most outstanding efforts." Robert Christgau gave the album a C, mocking the notion that Zappa's humor underscores serious commentary by asking "where's the serious stuff?"

Writing for DownBeat, Ray Townley gave the album 3.5 stars. "There's no pretentious concept behind the various tunes; just lots of electronically-twisted guitar runs, burning baritone violin, and a maze of sound colors/textures that pop in and out of the total picture without rhyme (but definitely with reason) . . . Compared to all the schlock being vomited onto the market these days, Over-night Sensation is a glass of quality cognac".

Later reviews evaluated the album far better, with AllMusic writer Steve Huey writing, "Love it or hate it, Over-Nite Sensation was a watershed album for Frank Zappa, the point where his post-'60s aesthetic was truly established". Kelly Fisher Lowe, in The Words and Music of Frank Zappa, wrote that "Over-Nite and Apostrophe (') are important [...] as a return to Mothers of Invention form and as close to traditional pop albums as Zappa would ever come."

The record was certified gold on November 9, 1976.

== Legacy ==
Over-Nite Sensation (1973) and Apostrophe (') (1974) are the subject of a Classic Albums series documentary from Eagle Rock Entertainment, released on DVD May 1, 2007.

The lines "She was buns-up kneelin' / Buns up! / I was wheelin an' dealin'" from "Dinah-Moe Humm" are quoted (as "So there she was / buns up and kneelin' / I was wheelin' and a-dealin'") in "Girl Keeps Coming Apart", on Aerosmith's Permanent Vacation. Zappa is credited in the liner notes.

== Track listing ==
All tracks are written by Frank Zappa.

Side one
No.	Title	Length
1.	"Camarillo Brillo"	4:01
2.	"I'm the Slime"	3:35
3.	"Dirty Love"	3:00
4.	"Fifty-Fifty"	6:08
Total length:		16:47

Side two
No.	Title	Length
1.	"Zomby Woof"	5:11
2.	"Dinah-Moe Humm"	6:05
3.	"Montana"	6:37
Total length:		17:50

=== 2023 50th Anniversary Super Deluxe Edition ===
Disc one - Original Album
No.	Title	Length

Disc one - Bonus Session Masters
No.	Title	Length
8.	"Wonderful Wino" (Complete Edit)	3:16
9.	"Inca Roads" (1973 Version) (2023 Mix)	3:49
10.	"RDNZL" (2023 Mix)	4:17
11.	"For the Young Sophisticate" (Dolby EQ Copy)	3:18
12.	"I'm the Slime" (Single Version)	3:04
13.	"Montana" (Single Edit with Intro)	5:29

Disc one - Bonus Vault Sessions
No.	Title	Length
14.	"Inca Roads" (Bolic Take-Home Mix)	3:47
15.	"RDNZL" (Take 2)	4:41
16.	"X-Forts (Echidna's Arf (of You))"	7:22

Disc two - Bonus Session Masters
No.	Title	Length
1.	"Camarillo Brillo" (Alternate Mix)	3:34
2.	"Face Down" (I'm the Slime - Demo)	2:11
3.	"I'm the Slime" (Basic Track Outtake)	5:56
4.	"Dirty Love" (Session Rehearsal)	3:53
5.	"Dirty Love" (with Quad Guitar)	4:13
6.	"Fifty-Fifty - Pipe Organ Improvisations"	4:02
7.	"Fifty-Fifty" (Basic Tracks, Take 7)	6:21
8.	"Dinah-Moe Humm" (Session Rehearsal)	2:05
9.	"Dinah-Moe Humm" (Bolic Take-Home Mix)	8:01
10.	"Montana" (Session Rehearsal)	7:23

Disc two - Live in Hollywood, California, March 23, 1973
No.	Title	Length
11.	"Montana"	7:26
12.	"Dupree's Paradise (Intro)"	8:19
13.	"Dupree's Paradise"	12:39

Disc three - Live in Hollywood, California, March 23, 1973
No.	Title	Length
1.	"Cosmik Debris"	6:35
2.	""The Dynamic Sal Marquez!""	2:05
3.	"Big Swifty"	12:47
4.	""...The Successor to Willie the Pimp""	0:58
5.	"The Curse of the Zomboids (I'm the Slime)"	6:10
6.	"Don't You Ever Wash That Thing?"	23:26
7.	"FZ & the Percussion Section"	5:17
8.	"Palladium Jam - Part 1"	3:56
9.	"Palladium Jam - Part 2"	9:01

Disc four - Live in Detroit, Michigan, May 12, 1973
No.	Title	Length
1.	"Cobo Hall '73 Band Intros and Sound Check"	6:08
2.	"Exercise #4"	2:27
3.	"Dog Breath"	1:16
4.	"The Dog Breath Variations"	1:32
5.	"Uncle Meat"	2:29
6.	"Fifty-Fifty"	7:21
7.	"Inca Roads"	11:47
8.	"FZ Introduces the Don't Eat the Yellow Snow Medley"	1:20
9.	"Don't Eat the Yellow Snow"	1:17
10.	"Nanook Rubs It"	6:04
11.	"St. Alfonzo's Pancake Breakfast"	2:14
12.	"Father O'Blivion"	2:34
13.	"St. Alfonzo's Pancake Breakfast (Reprise)"	5:25
14.	"Join the March"	0:59
15.	"Cosmik Debris"	7:34
16.	"Medley (King Kong / Chunga's Revenge / Son of Mr. Green Genes)"	12:36

== Personnel ==
Musicians

- Frank Zappa – guitar, vocals on all tracks except "Fifty-Fifty" and most of "Zomby Woof"
- Kin Vassy – vocals on "I'm the Slime", "Dinah-Moe Humm" and "Montana"
- Ricky Lancelotti – vocals on "Fifty-Fifty" and "Zomby Woof"
- Sal Marquez – trumpet, vocals on "Dinah-Moe Humm"
- Ian Underwood – clarinet, flute, alto saxophone, tenor saxophone
- Bruce Fowler – trombone
- Ruth Underwood – percussion, marimba, vibraphone
- Jean-Luc Ponty – violin, baritone violin
- George Duke – synthesizer, keyboards
- Tom Fowler – bass
- Ralph Humphrey – drums
- Tina Turner and the Ikettes – backing vocals on all tracks except "Camarillo Brillo" and "Fifty-Fifty" (uncredited)

Production

- Producer: Frank Zappa
- Engineers: Fred Borkgren, Stephen Desper, Terry Dunavan, Barry Keene, Bob Stone
- Remixing: Kerry McNabb
- Arranger: Frank Zappa
- Technician: Paul Hof
- Cover design: Ferenc Dobronyi
- Illustrations: Cover – David B. McMacken, Inside – Cal Schenkel

== Charts ==
=== Weekly charts ===
1973–1974 chart performance for Over-Nite Sensation
Chart (1973–1974)	Peak position
Australian Albums (Kent Music Report)	47
Norwegian Albums (VG-lista)	15
US Billboard 200	32

2023 chart performance for Over-Nite Sensation
Chart (2023)	Peak position
Austrian Albums (Ö3 Austria)	68
Belgian Albums (Ultratop Flanders)	64
Belgian Albums (Ultratop Wallonia)	190
Dutch Albums (Album Top 100)	86
German Albums (Offizielle Top 100)	21

=== Year-end charts ===
Year-end chart performance for Over-Nite Sensation
Chart (1974)	Position
US Billboard 200	72

== See also ==
- Mysterioso Pizzicato
