= Sleep Dirt =

Studio album by Frank Zappa
- Released: January 19, 1979
- Recorded: December 5–26, 1974 and 1976 at the Record Plant, LA, and Caribou Studios, Nederland, Colorado
- Genres: Jazz fusion; progressive rock
- Length: 40:32
- Label: DiscReet
- Producer: Frank Zappa

Frank Zappa chronology
Studio Tan (1978)	Sleep Dirt (1979)	Sheik Yerbouti (1979)

Professional ratings
Review scores
Source	Rating
AllMusic	3.5/5 stars
Christgau's Record Guide	B−
Music Week	2/4 stars
The Rolling Stone Album Guide	3/5 stars

Sleep Dirt is an album by Frank Zappa, released in January 1979 on his own DiscReet Records label, distributed by Warner Bros. Records. It reached No. 175 on the Billboard 200 album chart in the United States.

Zappa's original title for the album was Hot Rats III. As the original title implies, Zappa saw this as a sort of follow up to his earlier jazz-influenced rock albums such as Hot Rats (1969) and Waka/Jawaka (1972).

Though it was on his own label, Zappa did not authorize the original 1979 release of this album. Warner did no promotion and it was largely overlooked by fans upon release. At the same time Zappa gave interviews which described his legal problems with Warner and former manager Herb Cohen. The 1991 CD re-release was the first time the album was issued with Zappa's authorization.

Some of the songs on this album were originally written in 1972 for a Zappa stage musical called Hunchentoot. A complete script exists, but the recordings for this project were never completed.

== Recording sessions ==
The music was recorded at the Los Angeles Record Plant and at Caribou Ranch in Colorado during 1974 and 1976. The initial 1979 LP release of Sleep Dirt was entirely instrumental.

In 1982, Zappa asked singer Thana Harris to add her vocals to three songs from this album: "Flambay", "Spider of Destiny", and "Time is Money". Harris sings the part of a character named "Drakma: Queen of Cosmic Greed". Zappa stated in a 1992 interview that the vocal versions were the way that he originally intended to record them, but he could not find a female vocalist who could sing them at the time of the original recording.

At about the same time Chad Wackerman also overdubbed new drum tracks on "Flambay", "Spider of Destiny" and "Regyptian Strut", which replaced the original drum parts. Wackerman did not overdub drums on "Time is Money" even though he is credited for this in the CD notes.

== History ==
In May 1976 Zappa's relationship with manager and business partner Herb Cohen ended in litigation. Zappa and Cohen were the co-owners of DiscReet Records, which was distributed by Warner Bros. Records. When Zappa asked for a reassignment of his contract from DiscReet to Warner in order to advance the possibility of doing special projects without Cohen's involvement, Warner agreed. This led to the late 1976 release of Zoot Allures on Warner. But Warner changed its position following legal action from Cohen and Zappa's contract was assigned back to DiscReet.

This was one of four albums Zappa delivered to Warner in March 1977 for release on DiscReet to complete the contract. Zappa did not receive payment from Warner upon delivery of the tapes, which was a contract violation. The change of album title from Hot Rats III to Sleep Dirt was also done by Warner in violation of Zappa's contract.

During a long legal battle the four individual albums were eventually released during 1978 and 1979 as: Zappa in New York (a two LP set), Studio Tan, Sleep Dirt and Orchestral Favorites.

Much of the material from these four albums was also edited by Zappa into a four-LP box set called Läther. Zappa announced this album in a mid September 1977 interview where he described it as his "current album". Zappa negotiated a distribution deal with Phonogram Inc. to release Läther as the first release on the Zappa Records label. The album was originally scheduled for a Halloween 1977 release, but Warner claimed ownership of the material and threatened legal action, therefore preventing Zappa from releasing Läther.

Five of the album's seven tracks were included on the shelved Läther album. "Flambay" and "The Ocean Is the Ultimate Solution" appeared on that album in edited versions.

As Zappa had delivered only the tapes for Sleep Dirt to Warner Bros., the album was released in January 1979 with no musician or songwriting credits. Warner also commissioned sleeve art by cartoonist Gary Panter, which Zappa did not approve. Zappa described the cover as "horrible" and said that Warner had re-sequenced the songs without his approval. The creature shown on the cover is Hedorah from the 1971 Toho film Godzilla vs. Hedorah.

All of Zappa's DiscReet recordings were deleted when the Warner distribution agreement ended in 1982.

== CD releases ==
Zappa chose to reissue Sleep Dirt on CD in 1991, along with the Panter artwork and added credits. This release was on Zappa's Barking Pumpkin label. It included the vocal and drum overdubs added in the 1980s. The initial 1991 CDs retained the original version of "Regyptian Strut", but this was soon changed for later releases.

Panter would later provide additional art for the album when it was reissued by Rykodisc in 1995. Läther was finally officially released posthumously in 1996. Both versions of "Regyptian Strut" can also be heard on the 1996 edition of the Läther CD. A 2012 CD re-issue of Läther deletes four bonus tracks including the overdubbed version of "Regyptian Strut".

The 2012 remastered CD by Universal Music reverts to the original instrumental 1979 vinyl version of the album.

== Track listing ==
All tracks are written by Frank Zappa.

Side one
No.	Title	Length
1.	"Filthy Habits"	7:33
2.	"Flambay"	5:02
3.	"Spider of Destiny"	2:54
4.	"Regyptian Strut"	4:15
Total length:		20:22

Side two
No.	Title	Length
5.	"Time Is Money"	2:52
6.	"Sleep Dirt"	3:20
7.	"The Ocean Is the Ultimate Solution"	13:20
Total length:		20:10

== Personnel ==
Musicians

- Frank Zappa – guitar (1, 3, 5, 7), keyboards (1), percussion (4), acoustic lead guitar (6), synthesizer (7)
- Dave Parlato – bass guitar (1)
- Terry Bozzio – drums (1, 7)
- George Duke – keyboards (2–5), synth bass (5)
- Patrick O'Hearn – string bass (2, 3, 7), electric bass (7)
- Chester Thompson – drums (2–5, replaced by drum overdubs on CD remixes as noted below)
- Ruth Underwood – percussion (2–5)
- Bruce Fowler – brass (4)
- James "Bird Legs" Youman – bass guitar (4), acoustic rhythm guitar (6)
- Thana Harris – vocals (2, 3, 5 on 1991/1995 CD remix)
- Chad Wackerman – drum overdubs (2, 3, 5 on 1991/1995 CD remix) and (4 on 1995 CD remix)

Production

- Bob Stone – mastering, remastering, equalization
- Stephen Marcussen – mastering, equalization
- Gary Panter – art director, cover art

== Charts ==
Chart (1979)	Peak position
US Top LPs & Tape (Billboard)	175
