= Find Her Finer =

Single by Frank Zappa

from the album Zoot Allures
- B-side: "Zoot Allures"
- Released: 1976
- Recorded: 1976
- Genre: Rock, doo-wop, blues
- Length: 3:18
- Label: Warner Bros.
- Songwriter: Frank Zappa
- Producer: Frank Zappa

Frank Zappa singles chronology
"Du Bist Mein Sofa" (1975)	"Find Her Finer" (1976)	"Disco Boy" (1979)

"Find Her Finer" is a 1976 single by Frank Zappa from the album Zoot Allures. The song was recorded with Zappa's lips extremely close to the microphone, creating an intimate sound. Roy Estrada, a former member of Frank Zappa's former backing band, the Mothers of Invention, provided falsetto vocals to create a comic effect to the song. It was intended to be the lead single for Zoot Allures, but failed to chart, unlike its other single "Disco Boy". A live and sped up jazz version can also be found on the album The Best Band You Never Heard in Your Life. It was played in concert in 1976 and 1988.

== Meaning ==
The song's satirical lyrics suggest that the best way to win a girl over is to show that you are less intelligent than her. His reasoning for this is that women do not care for smart men, but instead a romantic. This parallels the stereotypical belief that men prefer unintelligent women. The songs also metaphorically refers to a clitoris being fingered, extra emphasized by the next track on the album: Friendly Little Finger.

== Track listing ==
7"

A."Find Her Finer" - 3:18
B."Zoot Allures" - 4:18

== Personnel ==
- Frank Zappa – guitar, synthesizer, bass, keyboards, lead vocals
- Terry Bozzio – drums, backing vocals
- Andre Lewis – backing vocals
- Roy Estrada – backing vocals
- Ruben Ladron de Guevara – backing vocals
- Captain Beefheart – harmonica (credited as "Donnie Vliet")
