= Mary Rawcliffe =

American soprano (1942–2023)

- Born: Mary Heller; October 29, 1942; Minneapolis, Minnesota, U.S.
- Died: January 12, 2023 (aged 80)
- Occupation: Soprano

Mary Rawcliffe (née Heller, October 29, 1942 – January 12, 2023) was an American soprano.

== Biography ==
Mary Heller was born in Minneapolis, Minnesota on October 29, 1942. In 1987 she appeared with the Los Angeles Master Chorale at the Beethoven Festival, alongside Michael Zearott and Thomas Wilcox. The following year, in February 1988 she performed with instrumentalist Stuart Fox at the Fine Arts Recital Hall in Orange Coast College, California, and in November 1988 supported fortepianist Steven Lubin in a Beethoven recital at Merkin Concert Hall in New York City. In 1994 she performed Handel's opera arias with the Los Angeles Musica Viva at Sunny Hills Arts Center. More recently she has performed with the Singing Strings Trio, with cellist Virginia Kron, and harpist Jennifer Sayre. She was affiliated with the California Polytechnic University in San Luis Obispo.

Rawcliffe died on January 12, 2023, at the age of 80.
