= Läther =

Studio album by Frank Zappa
- Released: September 24, 1996
- Recorded: 1969; 1972–1977
- Genres: Rock; orchestral; progressive rock; experimental rock; avant-garde; jazz fusion
- Length: 173:18
- Label: Rykodisc
- Producer: Frank Zappa

Frank Zappa chronology
| The Lost Episodes (1996) | Läther (1996) | Frank Zappa Plays the Music of Frank Zappa: A Memorial Tribute (1996) |

2012 Re-issue

Läther (/lɛðɜːr/, or "Leather") is the sixty-fifth official album by American musician Frank Zappa. It was released posthumously as a three-CD set on Rykodisc in 1996. The album's title is derived from bits of comic dialog that link the songs. Zappa also explained that the name is a joke, based on "common bastardized pronunciation of Germanic syllables by the Swiss."

Läther integrates many aspects of Zappa's musical oeuvre — heavy rock, orchestral works, and complex jazz flavored instrumentals, along with his distinctive electric guitar solos and satirical lyrics, all edited together in a seemingly random way.

Zappa said in 1978 that he originally configured the music on Läther as four individual albums, and that he completed these four albums in March 1977. Writing in the liner notes upon the album's release in 1996, Frank's wife Gail Zappa claimed a different story.

The Läther album was intended for release as a four-LP box set on Halloween, October 31, 1977. However, this release was cancelled. Prior to the official 1996 release, unauthorized bootleg recordings of this material were widely distributed.

A 1996 Goldmine magazine review compared Läther in importance to The Beach Boys' unfinished album Smile, describing it as "the Smile of the Freak Out! set: the great lost Uncle Frank album" and a "sprawling, flawed masterpiece".

== Background ==
Zappa's relationship with manager Herb Cohen ended in May 1976. Zappa and Cohen were the co-owners of the DiscReet record label, which was distributed by Warner Bros. Records. After Cohen cashed one of Zappa's royalty checks from Warner and kept the money for himself, Zappa sued him. Zappa was also upset with Cohen for signing acts he did not approve.

Cohen filed a lawsuit against Zappa in return, which froze money which the pair were expecting to receive from an out-of-court settlement with MGM/Verve over the rights to Zappa's early Mothers of Invention recordings. The MGM settlement was eventually finalized in mid 1977 after two years of negotiations. Zappa re-negotiated with Warner and had his contract re-assigned in October 1976. He delivered the album Zoot Allures directly to Warner that month, while bypassing DiscReet. Zappa had intended this as a double LP, but he was later forced to re-edit the release into a single LP at the insistence of Warner executives. Cohen countersued, claiming that the Warner release violated the terms of his DiscReet contract with Zappa. So the final four albums of Zappa's recording contract were then assigned back to DiscReet, against Zappa's objection.

== Recording sessions ==
Läther was assembled by Zappa in 1977 from a wide variety of recording sessions stretching back as far as eight years, but mostly between 1972 and 1976. The tracks utilize a constantly changing cast of backing musicians. Most of the songs on Läther are linked together with bits of musical sound effects (musique concrète) and comic dialog from Zappa band members, Terry Bozzio, Patrick O'Hearn, and Davey Moire. More of these same bits, or "grouts" as Zappa allegedly called them, appear on other albums such as Sheik Yerbouti.

The album's opener "Re-Gyptian Strut" comes from December 1974 sessions at Caribou Ranch in Colorado. "Flambé" and "Spider of Destiny" were also recorded at the ranch with additional overdubs in 1976 at the Los Angeles Record Plant. These three are among the songs written by Zappa in 1972 for a stage musical called Hunchentoot. A full script exists, but the Hunchentoot recordings were never completed.

Basic tracks for "Lemme Take You to the Beach" were recorded during The Hot Rats Sessions in 1969, with the working title "Dame Margret's Son To Be A Bride". The track was finished in 1976 at the Record Plant in Los Angeles. "Down in De Dew" comes from November 1972 sessions in New York and Los Angeles. "For The Young Sophisticate" is a 1973 studio recording from Bolic Sound and is different from the later live version on Tinsel Town Rebellion.

Most of the live tracks were recorded in December 1976 at the Palladium in New York City. The last recordings are live tracks including "Tryin' to Grow a Chin" from a February 1977 London show at the Hammersmith Odeon. This song also appeared in a different later recording on Sheik Yerbouti.

Many of the orchestral works come from a September 1975 session with the 37-piece Abnuceals Emuukha Electric Symphony Orchestra, which was recorded at Royce Hall with conductor Michael Zearott. Zappa said the 1975 Royce Hall sessions alone cost him about $200,000, due to the number of musicians hired.

The most substantial work is "The Adventures of Greggery Peccary", a story with Zappa's narration set to music, which lasts over 20 minutes. The piece is scored for a large orchestra and was recorded in Los Angeles between 1972 and 1974.

== History ==
In April 1975 Zappa complained about ongoing contractual disputes between DiscReet and Warner. The same month he had a one-sided demo acetate disc cut at Kendun Recorders in Burbank, California. This unreleased disc contains "Revised Music for Guitar and Low-Budget Orchestra", "200 Years Old" and "Re-Gyptian Strut". Zappa's liner notes in the June 1975 album One Size Fits All mention a planned studio follow up album which never appeared. Instead, Zappa released the (mostly) live album Bongo Fury in October 1975. Bongo Fury contained a four minute version of "200 Years Old" which was edited from the one on the April 1975 acetate.

A complete album titled Six Things was also cut as a demo acetate at Kendun in April 1976. This was an unreleased early edit of music from the Royce Hall orchestral sessions. The same year Zappa tried to negotiate release of an orchestral album with Columbia Masterworks, but the deal fell through when the label did not agree to Zappa's terms.

During the fall 1976 tour the Zappa band performed in front of slide projector images, one of which said "Warner Bros. Sucks!" Zappa was upset over inadequate promotion. By late 1976 he was determined to complete his Warner contract as soon as possible. As early as December that year Zappa talked about handing multiple individual albums over to Warner and had "more than four" currently in production. Contracts then stipulated that Zappa deliver four new albums to Warner for release on DiscReet. In December 1977 Zappa said:

"Between last October and December 31 of this year I was required to deliver to Warner Brothers four completed albums. I delivered all four in March of this year. According to the contract, upon receipt of the tapes, they have to pay me. They received the tapes and they did not pay me."

Warner was expecting to receive only one album at a time, not four. Upon delivery the label was required to pay an advance to Zappa of $60,000 per album ($240,000 total) and release the recordings in the United States within six weeks. Warner failed to honor these contractual terms. Zappa had paid in excess of $400,000 out of his own pocket to produce these tapes and in response, he filed a multi-million dollar breach of contract lawsuit.

Most of the material on Läther would be released during 1978 and 1979 on Zappa in New York, Studio Tan, Sleep Dirt (previously titled Hot Rats III), and Orchestral Favorites. In an October 1978 radio interview, Zappa identified these four individual albums as the ones he previously delivered to Warner and added "Läther was made out of four albums. Warners has released two of them already and they have two more that they're probably gonna release."

The first of these four albums was a two-LP live jazz rock album and was produced with Zappa approved cover art. Two others were single disc jazz rock studio albums, while the last was made up of orchestral recordings. Therefore, the complete four individual album collection actually fills a total of five full-length LPs. Zappa's contract with Warner defined a specific number of "units" and each individual release was counted as one album or one unit, regardless of the number of LP discs in the set.

After having violated the contract with Zappa, Warner scheduled the release of Zappa in New York on DiscReet. A Warner Bros. Records advertisement in the June 30, 1977, issue of Rolling Stone magazine described the release of the album as "imminent".

At approximately the same time Zappa was also planning a four-LP box set titled Läther. In 1979 Zappa said that he put the Läther album together based on the premise that Warner had not paid him for the four individual albums and this gave him the right to release the material elsewhere. Final editing for the album was completed at the Los Angeles Record Plant and Zappa's handwriting on the tape boxes show either EMI or Arista as the intended client. Both sets of recordings (five-LP and four-LP) have much of the same music, but each also has unique content.

Zappa attempted to get Läther released in the four-LP box configuration as the first release on the Zappa Records label. He briefly negotiated distribution with Capitol/EMI and then Phonogram Inc. At Phonogram the project reached the test pressing stage. Official documentation for the test pressing shows the project had a "Fixation Date" of 8/31/77 and a release scheduled for Halloween, October 31, 1977. But Warner interfered with these negotiations by claiming rights over the material. By this point Zappa had denied a music copyright license to Warner to reproduce the songs.

Zappa announced the release of Läther in a mid September 1977 interview, following a concert in San Diego, where he described it as his "current album". Zappa also wanted to release sides two and four as a single album. He said "it's only the rock 'n' roll, for people who can't afford the box." The single album release never appeared.

An article in Billboard magazine, dated October 22, 1977, described the upcoming release of Zappa in New York from Warner. The same article also stated that Phonogram would rush-release an unnamed all new four record set from Zappa with a list price of $27.92. A few uncensored full-length copies of Zappa in New York appeared but the album was quickly pulled from stores. Warner was forced to withdraw it by November due to legal action from Zappa. He objected to the release at this time and claimed that Warner began to manufacture the album only after they heard he had negotiated to release the recordings with a competing company.

Zappa appeared on WIOQ radio in Philadelphia on October 24, 1977 to promote his concert at The Spectrum the same night. While he played tracks from Läther, the broadcast also included a pre-recorded concert advertisement with a clip of Big Leg Emma from Zappa in New York. He complained about legal problems and pleaded with fans not to buy any of his Warner distributed recordings. Zappa did not indicate he was aware of the impending cancellation of Läther, which happened during the following week.

In December 1977 Zappa appeared on the Pasadena, California, radio station KROQ-FM and played the entire test pressing of Läther. While encouraging listeners to record the broadcast Zappa also counterclaimed that Warner did not have rights to the material. The same month Zappa said his breach of contract suit against Warner Bros. was for five million dollars but he later claimed that up to 20 million was at stake.

Bootlegs of the Läther recordings soon appeared in a variety of configurations. One was a four-LP box on the fictitious "Edison Record" label with a picture of Zappa on the cover but without his name. At least one bootleg version came directly from the test pressing, but most were lower quality ones sourced from broadcast tapes. Before the official release in 1996 bootlegs circulated widely.

Eventually, Warner issued all four individual albums starting in March 1978 and running through May of 1979. However, the label censored the 1978 version of Zappa in New York by removing the song Punky's Whips as well as another reference to Punky Meadows, a member of the American glam rock band Angel. The change of album title from "Hot Rats III" to "Sleep Dirt" and editing of the material were also done in violation of Zappa's contract. Since Zappa had supplied only the tapes for the final three albums they were released without musician or songwriting credits. Also, the artwork for these albums was not approved by Zappa. Instead, Warner commissioned the designs from cartoonist Gary Panter.

The first of Zappa's lawsuits against Warner was scheduled to go to court starting in January 1982. All four individual albums also went out of print when the DiscReet/Warner distribution agreement ended in 1982.

=== CD issues ===
Zappa chose to re-issue the four previously released individual albums on CD in 1991 along with the Panter artwork and added credits. Each of them were either remixed and or altered in various ways. These albums appeared in the US on Zappa's Barking Pumpkin label.

In 1995 Rykodisc again reissued Zappa's entire catalog up to that date. The 1995 CD versions of the four albums related to Läther have exactly the same audio content as the 1991 CDs.

One year later, Läther was released officially through Rykodisc as a three-CD album. This edition used new 1996 artwork and was released in a plastic jewel case. Gail Zappa confirmed that the stereo master tapes for the four-LP Läther box were used as the source. While Zappa's notes from the tape boxes show a slightly different track listing, the 1996 CD version of Läther is musically identical to the 1977 test pressings. The only difference is that four bonus tracks were also added. Among these is commentary from Zappa taken from his KROQ broadcast. Also, the title of the song "One More Time for the World" was changed to "The Ocean is the Ultimate Solution", the title under which a longer version the same song appears on the album Sleep Dirt.

Along with most of Zappa's material, a "mini-LP" CD edition was also released by Rykodisc in Japan, with the artwork reformatted to resemble the packaging of a vinyl album.

In December 2012 an official reissue of Läther appeared in cardboard packaging with the original intended 1977 artwork. This version omits the 1996 bonus tracks.

== Release and reception ==
Professional ratings
Review scores
| Source | Rating |
|---|---|
| Allmusic | 4/5 stars |

The official version of Läther was finally released with the authorization of Gail Zappa in September 1996, nearly three years after Frank's death.

It has been debated as to whether Frank Zappa had conceived the material as a four-LP box set from the beginning, or only later when working with Phonogram around September–October 1977. In the liner notes to the 1996 release, Gail Zappa says "As originally conceived by Frank, Läther was always a 4-record box set." She also claimed that Warner, wary of a four-LP box, had declined to release Läther. Despite Gail's claim, however, there is no evidence that Frank Zappa ever offered or delivered the four-LP Läther set to Warner, only the four individual albums. Frank himself actually contradicted Gail's posthumous claims that Warner had broken up Läther into other albums. Several interviews published in 1978 and an album review from 1996 explicitly state that Zappa re-edited the four individual albums into the Läther four-LP box and then presented it to Phonogram.

In a January 1978 Zappa interview the British publication New Musical Express said:

"Since his (Warner) contract had allegedly been breached, Zappa took his copy tapes of the four albums, added some new material, subtracted some old, and prepared a four-record set called "Läther", but pronounced "Leather".

Allmusic writer Richie Unterberger praised the album, but wrote that it would "appeal far more to the Zappa cultist than the general listener, though the Zappa cult – which has been craving Läther in its original format for years – is a pretty wide fan base in and of itself."

== Track listing ==
All tracks are written by Frank Zappa.

Disc one
| No. | Title | Original release | Length |
|---|---|---|---|
| 1. | "Re-Gyptian Strut" | Sleep Dirt | 4:36 |
| 2. | "Naval Aviation in Art?" | Orchestral Favorites | 1:32 |
| 3. | "A Little Green Rosetta" | Previously unreleased. A reworked version appears on Joe's Garage. This version has a guitar solo that can be heard on "Ship Ahoy" from Shut Up 'n Play Yer Guitar. | 2:48 |
| 4. | "Duck Duck Goose" | Previously unreleased | 3:01 |
| 5. | "Down in De Dew" | Previously unreleased | 2:57 |
| 6. | "For the Young Sophisticate" | Previously unreleased. A different version appears on Tinsel Town Rebellion. | 3:14 |
| 7. | "Tryin' to Grow a Chin" | Previously unreleased. A different version appears on Sheik Yerbouti. | 3:26 |
| 8. | "Broken Hearts Are for Assholes" | Previously unreleased. A different version appears on Sheik Yerbouti. | 4:40 |
| 9. | "The Legend of the Illinois Enema Bandit" | Zappa in New York | 12:41 |
| 10. | "Lemme Take You to the Beach" | Studio Tan | 2:46 |
| 11. | "Revised Music for Guitar & Low Budget Orchestra" | Studio Tan | 7:36 |
| 12. | "RDNZL" | Studio Tan | 8:14 |

Disc two
| No. | Title | Original release | Length |
|---|---|---|---|
| 1. | "Honey, Don't You Want a Man Like Me?" | Zappa in New York | 4:56 |
| 2. | "The Black Page #1" | Zappa in New York | 1:57 |
| 3. | "Big Leg Emma" | Zappa in New York | 2:11 |
| 4. | "Punky's Whips" | Zappa in New York (1977 edition) | 11:06 |
| 5. | "Flambé" | Sleep Dirt | 2:05 |
| 6. | "The Purple Lagoon" | Zappa in New York | 16:20 |
| 7. | "Pedro's Dowry" | Orchestral Favorites | 7:45 |
| 8. | "Läther" | Zappa in New York (under the title "I Promise Not to Come In Your Mouth") | 3:50 |
| 9. | "Spider of Destiny" | Sleep Dirt | 2:40 |
| 10. | "The Duke of Orchestral Prunes" | Orchestral Favorites | 4:21 |

Disc three
| No. | Title | Original release | Length |
|---|---|---|---|
| 1. | "Filthy Habits" | Sleep Dirt | 7:12 |
| 2. | "Titties & Beer" | Zappa in New York | 5:23 |
| 3. | "The Ocean Is the Ultimate Solution" | Sleep Dirt | 8:31 |
| 4. | "The Adventures of Greggery Peccary" | Studio Tan | 21:00 |

Bonus tracks (1996 Rykodisc CD and LP only)
| No. | Title | Original release | Length |
|---|---|---|---|
| 5. | "Regyptian Strut (1993)" | Sleep Dirt (remixed) | 4:42 |
| 6. | "Leather Goods" | Previously unreleased | 6:01 |
| 7. | "Revenge of the Knick Knack People" | Previously unreleased | 2:25 |
| 8. | "Time Is Money" | Sleep Dirt | 3:04 |

== Personnel ==
Credits are adapted from liner notes of 1996 Rykodisc release unless otherwise noted

Disc One, Track 1

- Frank Zappa – percussion
- George Duke – keyboards
- Bruce Fowler – all brass
- James "Bird Legs" Youman – bass
- Ruth Underwood – percussion
- Chester Thompson – drums

Disc One, Track 2; Disc Two, Track 7 & 10

- Frank Zappa – guitar
- Dave Parlato – bass
- Terry Bozzio – drums
- Emil Richards – percussion
- Orchestra conducted by Michael Zearott

Disc One, Track 3 (Part One)

- Frank Zappa – vocal
- George Duke – keyboards

Disc One, Track 3 (Part Two)

- Frank Zappa – lead guitar
- Andre Lewis – keyboards
- Roy Estrada – bass
- Terry Bozzio – drums

Disc One, Track 4, 7 & 8; Disc Three Track 6

- Frank Zappa – guitar, vocals
- Ray White – guitar, vocals
- Eddie Jobson – violin, keyboards
- Patrick O'Hearn – bass
- Terry Bozzio – drums, vocals

Disc One, Track 5

- Frank Zappa – all guitars, bass
- Jim Gordon – drums

Disc One, Track 6

- Frank Zappa – lead guitar, vocals
- George Duke – keyboards
- Tom Fowler – bass
- Ralph Humphrey – drums
- Ricky Lancelotti – vocals

Disc One, Track 9; Disc Two, Track 1, 2, 3, 4, 6, 8; Disc Three, Track 2

- Frank Zappa – lead guitar, vocals
- Ray White – rhythm guitar, vocals
- Eddie Jobson – keyboards, violin, vocals
- Patrick O'Hearn – bass, vocals
- Terry Bozzio – drums, vocals
- Ruth Underwood – percussion, synthesizer
- David Samuels – timpani, vibes
- Randy Brecker – trumpet
- Michael Brecker – tenor sax, flute
- Lou Marini – alto sax, flute
- Ronnie Cuber – baritone sax, clarinet
- Tom Malone – trombone, trumpet, piccolo
- Don Pardo – sophisticated narration

Disc One, Track 10

- Frank Zappa – guitar, vocals
- Davey Moire – vocals
- Eddie Jobson – keyboards, yodeling
- Max Bennett – bass
- Paul Humphrey – drums
- Don Brewer – bongos

Disc One, Track 11; Disc Three, Track 4

- Frank Zappa – guitar, vocals
- George Duke – keyboards
- Bruce Fowler – trombone
- Tom Fowler – bass
- Chester Thompson – drums

Disc One, Track 12; Disc Three, Track 8

- Frank Zappa – guitar
- George Duke – keyboards
- James "Bird Legs" Youman – bass
- Ruth Underwood – percussion, synthesizer
- Chester Thompson – drums

Disc Two, Track 5 & 9

- Frank Zappa – guitar
- George Duke – keyboards
- Patrick O'Hearn – bass
- Ruth Underwood – percussion
- Chester Thompson – drums

Disc Three, Track 1

- Frank Zappa – guitar, keyboards
- Dave Parlato – bass
- Terry Bozzio – drums

Disc Three, Track 3

- Frank Zappa – guitar, synthesizer
- Patrick O'Hearn – bass
- Terry Bozzio – drums

Disc Three, Track 4

- Frank Zappa – guitar, vocals
- George Duke – keyboards, vocals
- Tom Fowler – bass guitar
- Chester Thompson – drums
- Bruce Fowler – trombone
- Abnuceals Emuukha Electric Symphony Orchestra (uncredited)
  - John Berkman – piano
  - Michael Zearott – piano
  - Pamela Goldsmith – viola
  - Murray Adler – violin
  - Sheldon Sanov – violin
  - Jerry Kessler – cello
  - Edward Meares – bass
  - Don Waldrop – trombone
  - Jock Ellis – trombone
  - Dana Hughes – bass trombone
  - Earle Dumler – oboe
  - JoAnn Caldwell McNab – bassoon
  - Mike Altschul – woodwinds
  - Graham Young – trumpet
  - Jay Daversa – trumpet
  - Malcolm McNab – trumpet
  - Ray Reed – flute
  - Victor Morosco – sax
  - John Rotella – woodwinds
  - Alan Estes – percussion
  - Emil Richards – percussion

Disc Three, Track 5

- Frank Zappa – percussion
- George Duke – keyboards
- Bruce Fowler – all brass
- James "Bird Legs" Youman – bass
- Ruth Underwood – percussion
- Chad Wackerman – drum overdubs

Production credits

1977:

- Producer – Frank Zappa
- Engineers – Frank Zappa, Davey Moire, Rick Smith, Kerry McNabb

1996:

- Digital mastering & EQ – Spencer Chrislu
- Transfer engineers – David Dondorf, Spencer Chrislu
- Vaultmeisterment – Joe Travers
- Bonus section assembly, edits & mastering – Spencer Chrislu
- Cover concept – Dweezil Zappa
- Forward motion – Gail Zappa
- Deep-dish descriptives – Simon Prentis
- Cover execution & layout design – Steven Jurgensmeyer
- Enthusiasm – Jill Christiansen
- Special thanks to Susan S. Kaplan & Silvio

2012:

- Art direction – Frank Zappa
- Photography – Norman Seeff
- Refurbishment & layout – Michael Mesker for Frank Zappa
- Vaultmeisterment & digital transfers – Joe Travers, Utility Muffin Research Kitchen
- Production manager – Melanie Starks
