= I'm the Slime =

Single by Frank Zappa and The Mothers

from the album Over-Nite Sensation
- B-side: "Montana"
- Released: 1973
- Recorded: 1973
- Genre: Progressive rock, Funk rock, Comedy rock, Jazz fusion
- Length: 3:35 (album version); 3:02 (single version)
- Label: Warner Bros.
- Songwriter: Frank Zappa
- Producer: Frank Zappa

Frank Zappa singles chronology
"Cletus Awreetus-Awrightus" (1972)	"I'm the Slime" (1973)	"Cosmik Debris" (1974)

"I'm the Slime" is a 1973 single by Frank Zappa and The Mothers from the studio album Over-Nite Sensation. The single version is a different mix and edit from the version on the album.

Live recordings of the song can be found on Zappa in New York and You Can't Do That on Stage Anymore, Vol. 1, the latter version having been performed and recorded on the same night as the majority of tracks appearing on 1974's Roxy and Elsewhere. "I'm the Slime" and its b-side version of "Montana" were put on Zappa's best of Strictly Commercial. It was performed in concert from 1973 to 1977 and 1984.

== Lyrics and meaning ==
The song contains two parts; the first part is a riddle of insults in the form of "what am I?"

"I am gross and perverted. I'm obsessed 'n deranged. I have existed for years, but very little has changed. I'm the tool of the government and industry too, for I am destined to rule and regulate you. I may be vile and pernicious, but you can't look away. I make you think I'm delicious, with the stuff that I say. I'm the best you can get. Have you guessed me yet?"

The second part discusses the evils of the answer to the riddle: the various things seen on television.

== Ike & Tina Turner ==
For the recording of this song (and most of the Overnite Sensation LP), Zappa used Ike & Tina Turner's Bolic Sound studios in Inglewood. Tina Turner and the Ikettes sang backup vocals for various songs on Over-Nite Sensation including "I'm the Slime". According to Zappa, Ike Turner insisted that he pay them no more than $25 per song. However, an invoice shows that they were actually paid $25 per hour and a grand total of $187.50 each for 7 1/2 hours of service. Zappa recalled that after hearing one of the recordings in the studio, Ike Turner exclaimed, "What is this shit?" and later insisted that Tina and the Ikettes not be credited on the album.

== Saturday Night Live ==
Zappa performed "I'm the Slime", as well as "Purple Lagoon", and "Peaches en Regalia" in his first of two appearances on Saturday Night Live. NBC announcer Don Pardo was utilized for his distinctive delivery for the second movement (or B section) of "I'm the Slime". Zappa described this as the "highlight of [Don Pardo's] career." Moreover, Pardo was present and onstage live with Zappa in December 1976 at the Palladium in New York City during a performance of "I'm the Slime", as well as during parts of "Punky's Whips" and "The Illinois Enema Bandit", as documented in Zappa in New York.

== Track list ==
7"

A."I'm The Slime" – 3:08
B."Montana" – 4:39

== 40th Anniversary ==
The single was re-released to mark its 40th anniversary, as part of Record Store Day 2013. It was released on transparent green vinyl, highlighted with blue smoke lines, limited to a run of 3000 copies worldwide. The vinyl was cut from the original masters, and all profit went to the Frank Zappa foundation.

== Cover versions ==
Arjen Anthony Lucassen covered the song on his 2012 album Lost in the New Real. Lucassen's version updates the song by replacing the words "TV set" with "internet".

Czech alternative rock band Elektrobus made a cover version of this song in 1975, with Czech lyrics written by the band's drummer Vlastimil Marek. The January 1976 recording was released on the only Elektrobus album Nedefinitivní in 2001.

The industrial music band KMFDM included the lyrics in their song UAIOE from their 1989 album of the same name.

The dub/ska/rock band Long Beach Dub Allstars uses the song's hook in the intro of their song titled Luke from their 2001 album Wonders of the World.
