= Cosmik Debris =

Single by Frank Zappa

from the album Apostrophe (')
- A-side: "Don't Eat the Yellow Snow"
- Released: April 22, 1974
- Recorded: May 28, 1973
- Genre: Jazz rock, blues rock
- Length: 4:10
- Label: DiscReet Records
- Songwriter: Frank Zappa
- Producer: Frank Zappa

Frank Zappa singles chronology
"I'm the Slime" (1973)	"Cosmik Debris" (1974)	"Don't Eat the Yellow Snow" (1975)

"Cosmik Debris" is a song by American composer Frank Zappa, from his 1974 album Apostrophe (').

It concerns the Mystery Man, a typical guru or psychic, offering to help the narrator reach Nervanna [sic] for a "nominal service charge," and the narrator's refusal to buy into his act, "Look here, brother, who you jiving with that cosmik debris?" When the Mystery Man gets pushy, Zappa as the narrator tells how he snatched the crystal ball, hypnotized the Mystery Man, stole his belongings and blew his mind.

The song was popular on the Dr. Demento Show in the 1970s, and in Zappa's concerts, with memorable guitar solos from Zappa, also featuring George Duke on keyboard and Napoleon Murphy Brock on sax. The song was featured in the late-2010 Zappa Plays Zappa tour, where through video and editing (from 1970s-era shows), Frank Zappa on a large video screen both sang and played a guitar solo while the ZPZ band provided a live backing. This song was also a B-side to the single "Don't Eat the Yellow Snow."

== Connections to previous Zappa songs ==
References of previous songs are frequent in many Frank Zappa songs. "Cosmik Debris" shares the lyric "Now is that a real poncho or is that a Sears poncho?" which is a reference to the song "Camarillo Brillo" from the previous album "Over-Nite Sensation." The "dust of The Grand Wazoo" is also mentioned in the lyrics and refers to the album released by Zappa in 1972.

== Track list ==
A-side "Don't Eat The Yellow Snow" – 3:26 (Contains Don't Eat The Yellow Snow, Nanook Rubs it and the intro to St. Alfonzo's Pancake Breakfast)

B-side "Cosmik Debris" – 4:10
