= The Big Swifty =

- Origin: Florida, United States
- Genres: Experimental music, drone
- Years active: 1995–1999
- Label: Cherry Smash
- Members: Pat Pagano

The Big Swifty was a Florida-based ensemble that played loosely structured or improvised music. Led by multi-instrumentalist Pat Pagano, the group drew influence from minimalist and experimental music composers such as La Monte Young and Terry Riley. The project also took its name from the composition by Frank Zappa, whose early compositions Pagano admired. Their entire output was issued by Cherry Smash Records.

== History ==
The Big Swifty was formed by composer Pat Pagano in the mid-1990s, taking its name from Frank Zappa' 1972 composition from Waka/Jawaka. The ensemble featured an ever rotating line-up, with different musicians participating in live performances every show. The ensemble released their debut album Akroasis in 1999. The Big Swifty also recorded under the moniker Shri Swifty And The Mandali of Mantra and issued a second full-length album called The Canals of the Atlantean Plain in 1999.

== Discography ==
Studio albums

- Akroasis (1997)
- The Canals of the Atlantean Plain (1999)

EPs

- Movies for Your Ears (1995)
- Experimental Art Film (1996)
