= Sleep Dirt (instrumental) =

Instrumental by Frank Zappa

from the album Sleep Dirt
- Released: January 19, 1979
- Length: 3:20
- Label: DiscReet
- Songwriter(s): Frank Zappa
- Producer(s): Zappa

Sleep Dirt is an acoustic guitar duet featuring Frank Zappa and James Youman on Zappa's album Sleep Dirt.

The song's tone is described as intimate as Frank Zappa's sliding left hand gives it a special flavor. Zappa played a fast paced solo, while Youman played the accompaniment. The track has some of the dreamy intensity of half-conscious perception as Youman falters at the end and Zappa asks, "you getting tired?"; "no, my fingers got stuck."
