= Thor Johnson =

American conductor (1913–1975)

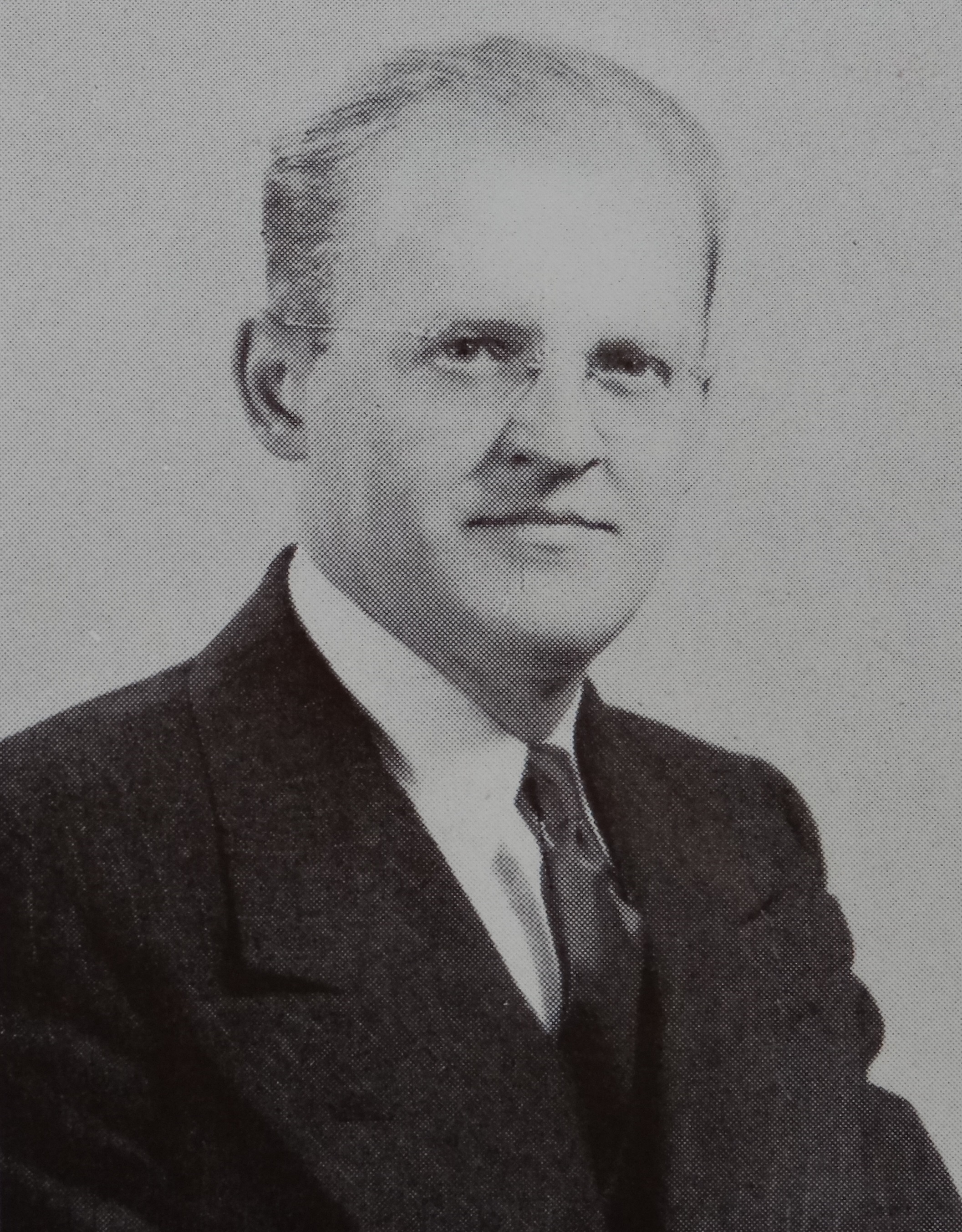
Thor Johnson

Thor Martin Johnson (June 10, 1913 – January 16, 1975) was an American conductor. He was born in Wisconsin Rapids, Wisconsin. He studied at the University of North Carolina at Chapel Hill, where he was president of the Alpha Rho chapter of Phi Mu Alpha Sinfonia fraternity. He was the first recipient of the fraternity's national Charles E. Lutton Man of Music Award in 1952. He was an initiate of the Alpha Xi chapter of Pi Kappa Alpha fraternity.

From 1940 to 1942, he was music director of the Grand Rapids Symphony in Grand Rapids, Michigan, which was a community orchestra at the time. In 1947 he was appointed conductor of the Cincinnati Symphony Orchestra, the youngest American born conductor of a major American orchestra at that time. That same year, Johnson was named the first music director of the Ojai Music Festival in Ojai, California. He served in that capacity from 1947–1950 and again from 1952–53.

A member of the Moravian Church, he was deeply devoted to promoting the music of his faith and was invited to organize and conduct the Early American Moravian Music Festivals from 1950 to 1974.

He visited Jean Sibelius on the personal invitation of the composer's oldest daughter, Eva Sibelius Paloheimo, in the summer of 1951 at his home Ainola (since 1972 a national museum in Järvenpää, Finland). In 1952, he was the first recipient of Phi Mu Alpha Sinfonia Fraternity's American Man of Music Award.

In 1953–54, Johnson made a series of early stereophonic recordings, primarily with the Cincinnati Symphony Orchestra, for Remington Records.

In 1955, he conducted the Naumburg Orchestral Concerts, in the Naumburg Bandshell, Central Park, in the summer series.

From 1958 to 1964, Johnson was a full professor and director of orchestral activities at Northwestern University at Evanston, Illinois. Johnson was appointed director of the Interlochen Arts Academy and conductor of the Interlochen Arts Academy Symphony Orchestra from 1964 to 1967. He founded the Peninsula Music Festival in Fish Creek, Wisconsin in 1952 and led its orchestra every summer until his death in 1975. The festival still plays every August. He is especially well regarded for the dozens of first performances that he personally commissioned and conducted.

He was a National Patron of Delta Omicron, an international professional music fraternity.

From 1967 to 1975, Johnson was music director for the Nashville Symphony in Nashville, Tennessee. Upon his death in 1975, Johnson was buried in God's Acre, the Moravian cemetery in the historic Old Salem area of Winston-Salem, North Carolina.
