= Zoot Allures =

1976 studio album by Frank Zappa

Studio album with live elements by Frank Zappa
- Released: October 29, 1976
- Recorded: May–June, 1976 at Record Plant Studios, Los Angeles, CA except: "Wonderful Wino" (1972/1973), "Friendly Little Finger" (1973/Oct. 1975) and "Black Napkins" (recorded live on Feb. 3, 1976 in Osaka, Japan)
- Genres: Jazz fusion; comedy rock; hard rock; blues rock
- Length: 43:40
- Label: Warner Bros.
- Producer: Frank Zappa

Frank Zappa chronology
| Bongo Fury (1975) | Zoot Allures (1976) | Zappa in New York (1978) |

Frank Zappa solo chronology
| Apostrophe (') (1974) | Zoot Allures (1976) | Zappa in New York (1978) |

Singles from Zoot Allures
- 1. "Find Her Finer" Released: 1976; 2. "Disco Boy" Released: 1976

Professional ratings
Review scores
| Source | Rating |
|---|---|
| AllMusic | 4/5 stars |

Zoot Allures is the 22nd album by the American rock musician Frank Zappa, released in October 1976. It was his only release on the Warner Bros. Records label.

In 1973 Zappa and his manager Herb Cohen became the co-owners of the DiscReet label, which was distributed by Warner Bros. Records. When their business relationship ended due to financial and legal disputes, Zappa re-negotiated his record contract. He had it reassigned from DiscReet to Warner Bros. in mid 1976, leading to the release of "Zoot Allures".

Cohen quickly filed a lawsuit against Warner and Zappa, based on his claim that this reassignment was in violation of previous contracts between himself and Zappa. Therefore, the final four albums of Zappa's recording contract were reassigned back to DiscReet against Zappa's objection, and the four albums eventually appeared in 1978 and 1979.

== Title ==
The title is a pun on the French expression "Zut alors!", which conveys "dammit!"

== Album information ==
In 1976, Zappa initially planned to release a double LP titled "Night of the Iron Sausage". However, Warner Bros. Records forced him to re-configure the material into a single LP, which Zappa renamed "Zoot Allures". For the single disc release Zappa, added some new songs and edited or remixed recordings from the 2 LP set.

Zappa played a test pressing of the 2 LP original album for Circus magazine in 1976. However, the magazine reported a partly erroneous track listing that included "Sleep Dirt", "The Ocean Is the Ultimate Solution", "Filthy Habits", and "Night of the Iron Sausage". The former three tracks eventually surfaced on the 1979 Sleep Dirt and the posthumous Läther; "Night of the Iron Sausage" was an early title for "Zoot Allures", while "The Ocean Is the Ultimate Solution" initially carried the title "Zoot Allures".

The exact contents of the "Night of the Iron Sausage" 2 LP set were unclear until the announcement that the album was to be finally released on December 2026 as part of the "Zoot Allures 50th Anniversary Deluxe Edition".

Early German copies of "Zoot Allures" had an incorrect early tracklist on the back cover including "Filthy Habits" along with six of the nine tracks from the released album. The misprinted covers suggest that there may have been another earlier version of the album that was never released.

Zappa recorded the album after completing a world tour with a band including Napoleon Murphy Brock on tenor sax and vocals, Andre Lewis on keyboards, Roy Estrada on bass and Terry Bozzio on drums. However, this band appeared only on the live track "Black Napkins" with only Bozzio retained to play on the sessions, although Lewis and Estrada contributed backing vocals.

By the time Zoot Allures was finished, Zappa had formed a new band, including Bozzio, bass player Patrick O'Hearn and keyboardist Eddie Jobson. This group was pictured on the cover with Zappa, although the latter two did not perform on the album.

== Songs ==
"Black Napkins", one of several guitar-driven pieces on Zoot Allures, began life accompanied by themes that would later make up "Sleep Dirt". The performance heard on the album was culled from Zappa's February 3, 1976 performance in Osaka, Japan, though it was edited for the official release. Along with "Zoot Allures" and "The Torture Never Stops", "Black Napkins" became a signature piece for Zappa, featuring heavily in nearly every subsequent tour and several official releases.

"Wonderful Wino" was originally released on Jeff Simmons's 1970 album, Lucille Has Messed My Mind Up. Zappa later attempted the song with the Mothers in a London June 1970 session released in 2020 on The Mothers 1970. Zappa reworked this recording in 1973 for a version that was eventually released on The Lost Episodes, while the Zoot Allures version includes an uncredited horn section apparently retained from the 1973 session.

On the liner notes to 1979's Sheik Yerbouti, Zappa noted that "Friendly Little Finger" (from Zoot Allures) was created using xenochrony. Zappa provided further details in the liner notes of The Guitar World According to Frank Zappa, mentioning that his guitar and Roy Estrada's "drone bass" (not credited on the original album) were recorded at a dressing room in Long Island in a two-track recording that Zappa later combined with a drum track outtake from "The Ocean is the Ultimate Solution."

The album's sound is influenced by heavy metal music, particularly on the song "Ms. Pinky".

== CD releases ==
The first CD edition of Zoot Allures, released by Rykodisc in 1990, has different mixes and edits than the original vinyl LP. The vinyl contains a longer edit of "Disco Boy" including a count-off by a drum machine (the first three seconds) and a longer fade-out making the track's duration 5:27, instead of the original CD duration of 5:11. The 2012 remastered CD version from Universal Music uses the original vinyl mixes and edits, with improved sound quality over the original CD.

== Related posthumous releases ==
In 2002, the Zappa estate released a January 1976 concert from Australia as FZ:OZ, the first full release from the tour prior to Zoot Allures, followed in 2022 by another archival release titled Zappa '75: Zagreb/Ljubljana, edited from two concerts in Yugoslavia in November 1975 when alto saxophonist and vocalist Norma Bell was temporarily added to the band.

In 2009, the Zappa estate released Philly '76, an album from the fall 1976 tour recorded on the release day of Zoot Allures, with a band including the four musicians from the cover photo (Zappa, Bozzio, O'Hearn and Jobson) along with guitarist/vocalist Ray White and keyboardist/vocalist Bianca Odin.

A "Zoot Allures 50th Anniversary Deluxe Edition" was released in December 2026. It includes many previously unreleased recordings including the entire the "Night of the Iron Sausage" 2 LP set.

== Track listing ==
Standard edition

All tracks are written by Frank Zappa, except "Wonderful Wino", written by Zappa and Jeff Simmons.

Side one
| No. | Title | Length |
|---|---|---|
| 1. | "Wind Up Workin' in a Gas Station" | 2:35 |
| 2. | "Black Napkins" | 4:18 |
| 3. | "The Torture Never Stops" | 9:52 |
| 4. | "Ms. Pinky" | 3:49 |
| Total length: | | 20:59 |

Side two
| No. | Title | Length |
|---|---|---|
| 5. | "Find Her Finer" | 4:22 |
| 6. | "Friendly Little Finger" | 4:19 |
| 7. | "Wonderful Wino" | 3:41 |
| 8. | "Zoot Allures" | 4:15 |
| 9. | "Disco Boy" | 5:28 |
| Total length: | | 22:41 |

Original Night of the Iron Sausage 2 LP

| No. | Title | Length |
|---|---|---|
| 1. | "Disco Boy (Old Mix)" |
| 2. | "Friendly Little Finger" |
| 3. | "Wonderful Wino" |
| 4. | "Zoot Allures" (early title: "Night of the Iron Sausage") |
| 5. | "Sleep Dirt" |
| 6. | "The Ocean Is The Ultimate Solution" (early title: "Zoot Allures") |
| 7. | "Ms. Pinky (Alternate Mix)" |
| 8. | "Filthy Habits (Alternate Mix)" |
| 9. | "Find Her Finer" |
| 10. | "Black Napkins (Alternate Edit)" |
| 11. | "The Torture Never Stops (Old Mix)" |

== Personnel ==
=== Musicians ===
- Frank Zappa – guitar (all tracks), bass (1, 3–7, 9), lead vocals (1, 3–5, 7, 9), synthesizer (1, 4, 5, 9), keyboards (3, 5, 7, 9), director of recreational activities (3)
- Terry Bozzio – drums (all tracks), backing vocals (5, 9)

Also featuring

- Davey Moiré – lead vocals (1), backing vocals (1, 9), engineer
- Andre Lewis – organ (2), vocals (2), backing vocals (5, 9)
- Roy Estrada – bass (2), vocals (2), backing vocals (4, 5, 9), drone bass (6)
- Napoleon Murphy Brock – vocals (2)
- Ruth Underwood – synthesizer (4, 6, 7), marimba (6, 8)
- Captain Beefheart – harmonica (4, 5) (credited as "Donnie Vliet")
- Ruben Ladron de Guevara – backing vocals (5)
- Ian Underwood – saxophone (6, 7)
- Bruce Fowler – trombone (6, 7)
- Sal Marquez – trumpet (6, 7)
- Dave Parlato – bass (8)
- Lu Ann Neil – harp (8)
- Sparkie Parker (Note: Sparkie Parker's credit is replaced with "Sharkie Barker" on all releases from 1990 onwards.) – backing vocals (9)

=== Production staff ===
- Arnie Acosta – mastering
- Amy Bernstein – layout design
- Michael Braunstein – engineer
- Gary Heery – photography
- Cal Schenkel – design
- Bob Stone – digital remastering

== Release history ==
| Country | Date | Label | Format | Catalog |
|---|---|---|---|---|
| United States; Canada | October 20, 1976 | Warner Bros. | LP | BS 2970 |
| United Kingdom | December 1976 | Warner Bros. | LP | K 56298 |
| United States | May 1990 | Rykodisc | CD | RCD 10160 |
| United Kingdom | May 1990 | Zappa Records | CD | CDZAP22 |
| United States | May 2, 1995 | Rykodisc | CD | RCD 10523 |
| United States | August 28, 2012 | Universal Music | CD | ZR3855 |

== Charts ==
| Chart (1976) | Peak position |
|---|---|
| United States (Billboard 200) | 61 |
| Australia (Kent Music Report) | 82 |
