= Don't Eat the Yellow Snow =

1974 single by Frank Zappa

Single by Frank Zappa

from the album Apostrophe (')
- B-side: "Cosmik Debris"
- Released: August 1974
- Recorded: May & December 1973
- Genre: Progressive rock; blues rock
- Length: 3:26 (Single version); 10:53 (Original suite); 2:07 ("Don't Eat the Yellow Snow"); 4:38 ("Nanook Rubs It"); 1:50 ("St. Alfonzo's Pancake Breakfast"); 2:18 ("Father O'Blivion")
- Label: DiscReet
- Songwriter: Frank Zappa
- Producer: Frank Zappa

Frank Zappa singles chronology
"Cosmik Debris" (1974)	"Don't Eat the Yellow Snow" (1974)	"Du Bist Mein Sofa" (1975)

"Don't Eat the Yellow Snow" is a suite by the American musician Frank Zappa, made up of the first four tracks of his fifth solo album Apostrophe (') (1974): "Don't Eat the Yellow Snow", "Nanook Rubs It", "St. Alfonzo's Pancake Breakfast", and "Father O'Blivion". Each song in the suite is loosely connected, although the songs are not all connected by one overall story/theme. The suite was only played in full from 1973 to 1974 and 1978 to 1980. "Saint Alfonzo's Pancake Breakfast" features Zappa's percussionist Ruth Underwood on marimba, who added a very distinct sound to many of his songs in the early 1970s.

In keeping with the arctic theme of the song, after the first lyric "Dreamed I was an Eskimo" there is a musical quotation from the 1947 jazz tune "Midnight Sun".

== Story ==
"Don't Eat the Yellow Snow" is a song about a man who dreams that he was an Eskimo named Nanook. His mother warns him "Watch out where the huskies go, and don't you eat that yellow snow." The song directly transitions into "Nanook Rubs It". The song is about Nanook encountering a fur trapper "strictly from commercial" who is whipping Nanook's "favorite baby seal" with a "lead-filled snow shoe". Eventually Nanook gets so mad he rubs husky "wee wee" into the fur trapper's eyes, blinding him. According to the lyrics, this scene is destined to take the place of "The Mud Shark" (a song from the live album Fillmore East – June 1971) in Zappa mythology. Zappa then sings in the fur trapper's perspective, who laments over the fact that he has been blinded. The fur trapper then makes his way to the parish of St. Alfonzo, introducing the next song "St. Alfonzo's Pancake Breakfast".

From this point forward, the suite almost completely abandons the previous storyline (the fur trapper's blindness is never explicitly healed though an outtake of Nanook Rubs It reveals that there is a cure to his afflicted eye.) In this song a man attending St. Alfonzo's Pancake Breakfast engages in such appalling deportment as stealing margarine pats from the tables, urinating on the bingo cards, and instigating an affair with an attractive married female churchgoer whose husband is in the Marine Corps and who is into sadomasochism. The final song in the suite, "Father O'Blivion", is about a priest, Father Vivian O'Blivion, who makes the pancakes for the St. Alfonzo fund-raiser. The lyrics somewhat ambiguously describe his recent sexual encounter involving a leprechaun and a sock, after which the Father proclaims that St. Alfonzo would be proud of his achievement. Then he utters the Latin phrase "Dominus vobiscum, Et cum spiritu tuo (meaning "The Lord be with you, and with your spirit."). Won't you eat my sleazy pancakes just for Saintly Alfonzo." There are many possible reasons why the pancakes are "sleazy"; Zappa leaves them to the listener's interpretation. The suite can only loosely be said to follow a story and is treated as one piece only because of the musical transitions, the way each song introduces the next, and how later songs reference previous songs.

== "Rollo" ==
"Rollo" was a piece of music that went along with the original suite, but Zappa decided against putting the whole piece in the album. Instead, he decided to add the main theme of "Rollo" as the instrumental second half of "St. Alfonzo's Pancake Breakfast". The entire suite appears in full on the live album You Can't Do That on Stage Anymore, Vol. 1, recorded at Hammersmith Apollo (Hammersmith Odeon), in London, on February 18–19, 1979. The piece by itself also appears on the posthumous albums QuAUDIOPHILIAc and Imaginary Diseases. The piece itself was written during Zappa's recovery from injuries suffered in December 1971, when he was pushed from the stage at London's Rainbow Theatre by a deranged fan. The original piece had lyrics detailing the adventures of a "man and a dog" (the dog being named Rollo) who encounter a couple in some sort of act of lovemaking. The piece was performed with the vocals during much of Zappa's Grand Wazoo Orchestra tour in September 1972. Sometime after that tour, Zappa decided to drop the lyrics and play it strictly as an instrumental; eventually finding its way into the Yellow Snow suite. In 1978, Zappa resurrected and revised the lyrics (sung by keyboardist Tommy Mars) into the suite. "Rollo" was performed on October 21, 1978, during Zappa's appearance as host of Saturday Night Live. For the broadcast, Tommy Mars' vocals were modulated via a vocoder to avoid issues with network censors concerning the song's lyrical content.

== Single ==
A disc jockey in Pittsburgh edited the album versions of "Don't Eat the Yellow Snow" and "Nanook Rubs It" to play on his radio show. While Zappa toured Europe, he learned of this version's success, and decided to create his own edited version once he returned to the United States, and released it as a single. The version released as a single contains some of the album version of "Don't Eat the Yellow Snow", most of "Nanook Rubs It", and the intro to "St. Alfonzo's Pancake Breakfast." The single also appears on Frank Zappa's best-of, Strictly Commercial, which title is taken from the lyrics of the song "Nanook Rubs It".

The single was Zappa's first chart entry on the Billboard Hot 100, peaking at #86 in November 1974.

=== Track list ===
A."Don't Eat the Yellow Snow" – 3:26 (Contains "Don't Eat the Yellow Snow", "Nanook Rubs It" and the intro to "St. Alfonzo's Pancake Breakfast")
B."Cosmik Debris" – 4:10

=== Record Store Day reissue ===
On April 14, 2014, Zappa Records released a special limited edition re-issue of the single edit originally released in 1974. This edition contains an alternative version of the piece "Down in De Dew" (from Zappa's 1996 posthumous release Läther) as the B-Side. The record sleeve uses a previously rejected cover photo for Apostrophe (').
