= Daniel Lewis (conductor) =

American conductor (1925–2017)

Daniel George Lewis (May 10, 1925 – July 7, 2017) was an American orchestral conductor and University Professor Emeritus at the University of Southern California (USC).

== Education ==
Trained as a violinist, Lewis studied at the Claremont Graduate School (now Claremont Graduate University) and the Hochschule fuer Musik in Munich. He also spent time with the Bavarian Radio Symphony Orchestra.

== Academic positions ==
Daniel Lewis arrived at the USC Thornton School of Music in 1970. As director of conducting studies and head of the orchestral music program, he helped make the USC Symphony one of the most respected conservatory ensembles in the nation. He was head of the School of Music from 1976 to 1995. In 1984, he became the first faculty member of the School of Music to receive the title of University Professor. Some notable quotes regarding his teaching style:

- "He demands a kind of intensity with his orchestra. With Daniel Lewis, it was an event just to go to rehearsal. He has a genuine love for music and the ability to transfer those feelings in a way that inspires those who are making the sounds." (Cynthia Phelps, principal viola, New York Philharmonic)
- "He instills a discipline in his students. You're either ready or you're out" (Amy Sims, concertmaster, Omaha Symphony, former member of Southwest Chamber Music)
- "I'm not trying to create a battle or victory over them. I just want them to live up to what their potential is." (Daniel Lewis)

He has also held academic positions at the New England Conservatory of Music; University of California, San Diego; California State University, Fullerton; and the Colburn School. He taught at the Conductors' Institute (New York), the Aspen School of Music, and many of the American Symphony Orchestra League's conducting workshops.

In 1982, he served with Leonard Bernstein as artistic co-director of the first season of the Los Angeles Philharmonic Institute, and remained on the faculty for many seasons thereafter.

== Orchestral appointments and guest conducting ==
From 1971 to 1982, he was music director of the Pasadena Symphony. Under Lewis' leadership, the orchestra became fully professional, winning critical acclaim and five ASCAP (American Society of Composers, Authors and Publishers) awards for adventuresome programming.

He has twice served as music director of the Ojai Music Festival, music director of the Cabrillo Music Festival, and musical advisor to the Glendale Symphony. He was associate conductor of the San Diego Symphony under Robert Shaw

Lewis made his debut with the Los Angeles Philharmonic in 1974, and he has guest-conducted that orchestra in more than 30 concerts at the Dorothy Chandler Pavilion and the Hollywood Bowl. He has also been a guest conductor with the Los Angeles Chamber Orchestra, Minnesota Orchestra, Atlanta Symphony, Seattle Symphony, Louisville Symphony, as well as several other American and European ensembles.

== Personal life ==
Lewis married Oneta Gwendolyn Belsha during World War II. They met while attending Grossmont High School in El Cajon, California. They had six children, fifteen grandchildren, and twelve great-grandchildren.

Lewis enlisted in the US Navy during World War II and served in the Pacific. After the war, he completed his education at San Diego State College. Prior to accepting a position at Fullerton State College, Lewis taught music at Helix High School in La Mesa. Its band won many awards in various competitions under his leadership. In addition, he was the founding music director of the San Diego Civic Youth Orchestra, which rehearsed at the high school and provided an opportunity for very advanced high-school-aged musicians to perform with a group of their peers. He also taught at Grossmont College in El Cajon.

In order to provide a better life for his family in San Diego, Lewis worked extra jobs at night. He would perform at night in various orchestras, such as Starlight Opera and the San Diego ice show. From time to time, he also taught violin to private students. This enabled the family to maintain a 2-story home in San Diego with a yard and room for six children.

At one time, Lewis was Concertmaster of the San Diego Symphony.

In 1959 Lewis received a Fulbright Scholarship to study music in Munich, Germany, where he and his family lived for about 10 months.
