= Disco Boy (song) =

Single by Frank Zappa

from the album Zoot Allures
- B-side: "Ms. Pinky, Bird Walk"
- Released: 1976
- Recorded: 1976
- Genre: Hard rock; comedy rock
- Length: 5:11, 5:28
- Label: Warner Bros.
- Songwriters: Frank Zappa; Jeff Simmons
- Producer: Frank Zappa

Frank Zappa singles chronology
"Find Her Finer" (1976)	"Disco Boy" (1976)	"Dancin' Fool" (1979)

"Disco Boy" is a single composed by musician Frank Zappa from his 1976 album Zoot Allures. It was featured on Frank Zappa's best of album Strictly Commercial.

A sped-up version of the song appears in both the film Baby Snakes and its subsequent soundtrack, as well as best of album Son of Cheap Thrills.

== Structure and meaning ==
The song's structure is similar-sounding to previous work by Zappa. However, in this particular song, Zappa satirically added a more pop feel to it to go along with the theme of the song. The song addresses the stereotypes affiliated with the disco era. The vain tone of the song is set by the lyrics, "Leave his hair alone, but you can kiss his comb." The lyrics, "Disco boy, do the bump every night, 'til the disco girl who's really right, gonna fall for your line, and feed you a box full of Chicken Delight" indicate that the disco boy is not looking for love, but just a one-night stand. The lyric "but thank the lord that you still got hands, to help you do that jerkin' that'll blot out your disco sorrow" alludes to his lust for the disco girl and that when he loses her, he can always simply masturbate. Besides disco, this song is also a commentary on Zappa's dislike of men who find themselves irresistible to women.

Record World said that "Zappa is at his best with this sardonic send-up of the disco scene."

== Rykodisc CD release ==
When put onto Rykodisc, the vocal on "Disco Boy" was mixed differently and the three second drum machine intro was cut.

== Track listing ==
Version 1:

A."Disco Boy" - 5:28
B."Ms. Pinky" - 3:40

Version 2:

A."Disco Boy" - 5:28
B."Bird Man" (Herbie Mann) - 3:40
