= Michael Zearott =

American musician (1937–2019)

Michael Zearott (born August 22, 1937, in San Francisco, California, died July 21, 2019, in Clarkston, Washington), was an American conductor, composer, pianist and music educator. A First Prize, Gold Medal winner of the Dimitri Mitropoulos International Conducting Competition, he conducted the New York Philharmonic in Lincoln Center for the Performing Arts, and was also invited to conduct for the Los Angeles Philharmonic, Los Angeles Chamber Symphony, California Chamber Symphony, San Diego Symphony and others in the United States as well as Europe. Zearott was the first student to earn a Ph.D. in composition at University of California, Los Angeles (UCLA).

== Biography ==
Michael Zearott was born in San Francisco, and spent most of his early years in the Los Angeles area, graduating from Westchester High School in 1955. Zearott earned a Ph.D. in composition at UCLA, the first to do so. In 1969 he was awarded the Gold Medal (First Prize) of the Dimitri Mitropoulos International Conducting Competition by Leonard Bernstein at the Philharmonic Hall of Lincoln Center, which as a result saw him become associate conductor of the Orchestre National de Monte Carlo for two years, performing to the likes of Prince Rainier and Grace Kelly. He was selected as the Acting Artistic Director of the San Diego Symphony in 1970. In 1972, he served as musical director of the Ojai Music Festival, in Ojai, California. and guest conductor with the Glendale Symphony Orchestra. He conducted two of Frank Zappa's orchestral concerts at UCLA's Royce Hall in September 1975, which was released four years later on the Zappa album Orchestral Favorites.

During the 1980s, Michael Zearott served as music director for the Nova chamber music concerts in Southern California. In 1981 he declared that he was influenced by Vincent van Gogh, stating that he wants to do "music that jumps off the stage" and has soul, just like Van Gogh's work "jumps off the canvas". Zearott appeared on the 1986 Keith Clark album Copland: Appalachian Spring Suite as a pianist. In 1987, he appeared with the Los Angeles Master Chorale at the Beethoven Festival as a pianist, alongside Mary Rawcliffe and Thomas Wilcox. He also served as the conductor on a tour organized by Francis Ford Coppola in the early 1980s, and conducted many of the original Radio City performances of Abel Gance's Napoleon in 1997. Zearott was on the faculties of UCLA, CSULA, CSULB, Loyola Marymount, and Lewis-Clark State College, where he still was as of 2015).

Michael Zearott's compositions included Concerto Mariachi, which he wrote in 1990 for guitarist Pepe Romero.
