= Herb Cohen =

American music executive (1932-2010)

Herbert Cohen (December 30, 1932 – March 16, 2010) was an American personal manager, record company executive, and music publisher based in Los Angeles during the 1960 and 1970s. He was known as the manager of Alice Cooper, Linda Ronstadt, Frank Zappa, Tim Buckley, Odetta, Tom Waits, George Duke, and the Turtles featuring Flo & Eddie. He also managed the all-female band Fanny in the late 1960s and got them signed to Warner Bros. after a performance at the Troubadour.

== Life and career ==
Cohen was born in New York. After a period in the army in 1952, he moved to Los Angeles in the mid-1950s, and started to put on concerts with folk singers such as Pete Seeger and Odetta. He began running coffee bars and folk clubs, such as the Unicorn and Cosmo Alley, during the late 1950s and early 1960s. Cohen also managed singer Judy Henske and comedian Lenny Bruce.

He was best known as the manager of Frank Zappa and the Mothers of Invention from 1965, arranging their first club dates and, after encouraging record producer Tom Wilson to see them perform, securing their first record deal. He and Zappa went on to set up and jointly own the Straight, Bizarre, and Discreet record labels. After a ten-year association, he and Zappa parted company amid litigation in 1976. Zappa claimed that Cohen and his brother Martin "Mutt" Cohen, a music lawyer, were profiting unduly from his earnings, and Cohen counter-sued, claiming that Zappa had taken his album Zoot Allures directly to Warner Bros. contrary to a contract between them.

He also handled Montreux Jazz Festival tours of Japan and the US, and produced the US portion of the Nelson Mandela concert in Wembley Stadium upon Mandela's release. Cohen managed Tom Waits until 1982, and, after that time, his main management client was jazz musician George Duke. Cohen reactivated the Bizarre and Straight labels in 1988, calling it "Bizarre/Straight Records," which was distributed by Enigma Records, and, later, Rhino Records. Bizarre/Straight released early recordings of both Waits and Tim Buckley. Some of the Bizarre/Straight releases were later released by Manifesto Records, a label formed in 1995 and run by his nephew, Evan Cohen, who is also a music industry lawyer.

In 1989–91, Cohen managed the Russian rock group Autograph (who appeared at Live Aid for Africa) and oversaw the recording of their debut American album Tear Down the Border, produced by Robert Duffey and released in 1991 on the Bizarre/Straight label, distributed by Rhino Records.

In 2009, Cohen filed suit for libel against British journalist Barney Hoskyns and his publisher, Random House, Inc., with regard to statements in Hoskyns' book Lowside of the Road: A Life of Tom Waits.

== Death ==
Cohen died in 2010, in Napa, California, of complications from cancer. He was 77 years old.
