= DiscReet Records =

American record label

DiscReet Records, self-identified simply as DiscReet, was a record label founded by Frank Zappa and his then business partner and manager Herb Cohen. The name of the label was a pun derived from disc and the Compatible Discrete 4 process of encoding quadraphonic sound signals into phonograph records.

The label was launched in January 1973 when DiscReet arranged a distribution contract with the Warner Bros. Records group of labels. The previous Zappa/Cohen labels, Bizarre Records and Straight Records, were discontinued at the same time that DiscReet was created.

DiscReet issued many albums by Frank Zappa and The Mothers of Invention between 1973 and 1979. Another notable act on the label was Ted Nugent and the Amboy Dukes, who recorded their final two albums for DiscReet. Following this, Ted Nugent began his solo career. Cohen also brought to the label recordings by other artists such as Tim Buckley.

Zappa's original intention was to release all albums on the label in conventional 2-channel stereo and 4-channel quadraphonic sound simultaneously. DiscReet issued two albums specially remixed for quadraphonic during 1973. These were Over-Nite Sensation credited to Frank Zappa and the Mothers and Apostrophe (') credited to Zappa alone. But the quadraphonic policy had to be dropped after just two releases. Also advertised were quadraphonic versions of two other Zappa titles. These were the double live album from 1974, Roxy & Elsewhere, and the 1975 (mostly) studio album One Size Fits All. The four-channel master tapes for these albums may still exist in the Zappa archives, but the quadraphonic versions have never been issued.

In May 1976, Zappa's relationship with Cohen ended and the partners filed lawsuits against each other. Among their arguments was that Cohen had signed record deals with Kathy Dalton and Growl, two acts which Zappa did not approve.

At the same time, Zappa also had disagreements with Warner Bros. Records; the DiscReet label became inactive in 1979 following the decision by Warner Bros. to release four albums for which Zappa claimed Warner Bros. did not have proper authorization. The albums were Zappa in New York (a 2 LP set), Studio Tan, Sleep Dirt, and Orchestral Favorites. The later three of these disputed titles had no songwriting or production credits and used cover artwork by cartoonist Gary Panter, which was not approved by Zappa.

Warner Bros. reissued some of Zappa's DiscReet recordings on the Reprise Records subsidiary in the late 1970s and they were deleted in 1982. Zappa created Zappa Records in 1979 and Barking Pumpkin Records in 1981; these labels had no involvement with Cohen and were separate business entities from DiscReet.

In 1988 and 1989, DiscReet recordings by Tim Buckley and Ted Nugent and the Amboy Dukes were briefly re-issued on CD and cassette by the Enigma Retro label. From the late 1980s until 2012, Zappa's DiscReet catalog had been available on CD from Rykodisc. In 2012, the Zappa Family Trust regained the rights to Zappa's DiscReet catalog and signed a new distribution agreement with Universal Music Enterprises to reissue the recordings on the Zappa Records label.

== Notable artists ==
- Tim Buckley
- Keith
- Ted Nugent and the Amboy Dukes
- Frank Zappa and the Mothers of Invention
