= Does Humor Belong in Music? (video) =

1985 Frank Zappa concert video

DVD Cover

Does Humor Belong in Music? is a one-hour Frank Zappa concert video composed of live performances at The Pier in New York City (August 26, 1984) along with a few interview segments. It was released on VHS by MPI Home Video in 1985 and reissued on DVD in 2003 by EMI. The video has no recorded material in common with the album of the same name, but some of the tracks were released (in whole or in part) on Volumes One, Three and Six of the You Can't Do That on Stage Anymore series.

A laserdisc version was also released in Japan, complete with Japanese subtitles for all spoken and sung material and featuring a slightly different audio mix than the VHS and DVD versions. This laserdisc version was available as a bootleg DVD from both the "Digital Underground" label (no association with the rap group of the same name) and the "Room 101" bootleg label, released a year or so before the official EMI DVD.

== Track listing ==
1. "Zoot Allures"
2. "Tinsel Town Rebellion"
  - City of Tiny Lites (beginning) / interview segment
3. "Trouble Every Day"
4. "Hot Plate Heaven at the Green Hotel" (edited, and including more interview segments)
  - Goblin Girl (beginning) / interview segment
  - The Deathless Horsie (ending)
5. "The Dangerous Kitchen"
6. "He's So Gay"
7. "Bobby Brown Goes Down"
8. "Keep It Greasy"
9. "Honey, Don't You Want a Man Like Me?"
  - Carol, You Fool (beginning) / interview segment
10. "Dinah-Moe Humm"
11. "Cosmik Debris"
  - (Encore)
12. "Be in My Video"
13. "Dancin' Fool"
14. "Whippin' Post"

== Personnel ==
- Frank Zappa - guitar, vocals
- Ray White - guitar, vocals
- Ike Willis - guitar, vocals, duck call and other effects
- Bobby Martin - vocals, keyboards, French horn, sax
- Allan Zavod - keyboards
- Scott Thunes - bass
- Chad Wackerman - drums
