= Understanding America =

Compilation album by Frank Zappa
- Released: October 31, 2012
- Recorded: March 9, 1966 – February 26, 1988
- Genre: Rock, avant-garde
- Length: 142:13
- Label: Zappa; Catalog Number: ZR 3892
- Producer: Frank Zappa

Frank Zappa chronology
Road Tapes, Venue #1 (2012)	Understanding America (2012)	Finer Moments (2012)

Professional ratings
Review scores
Source	Rating
Allmusic	3/5 stars
Critics At Large	(very favourable)

Understanding America is a compilation album by Frank Zappa. It was compiled and mastered by Zappa before his death in 1993 and released posthumously in 2012. Despite being released after UMe/Zappa Records had issued most of the albums in remastered form, all of the tracks included are sourced from the original 1986-1992 digital masterings.

== Track listing ==
All tracks are written by Frank Zappa except as noted.

Disc one
No.	Title	Original release	Length
1.	"Hungry Freaks, Daddy"	Freak Out!	3:38
2.	"Plastic People"	Absolutely Free	3:42
3.	"Mom & Dad (Remix)"	We're Only in It for the Money	2:17
4.	"It Can't Happen Here"	Freak Out!	3:07
5.	"Who Are the Brain Police?"	Freak Out!	3:33
6.	"Who Needs the Peace Corps? (Remix)"	We're Only in It for the Money	2:35
7.	"Brown Shoes Don't Make It"	Absolutely Free	7:29
8.	"Concentration Moon (Remix)"	We're Only in It for the Money	2:17
9.	"Trouble Every Day"	Freak Out!	5:08
10.	"You're Probably Wondering Why I'm Here"	Freak Out!	3:36
11.	"We're Turning Again"	Frank Zappa Meets the Mothers of Prevention	4:55
12.	"Road Ladies"	Chunga's Revenge	4:08
13.	"What Kind of Girl Do You Think We Are?"	Fillmore East – June 1971	4:33
14.	"Camarillo Brillo"	Over-Nite Sensation	3:53
15.	"Find Her Finer"	Zoot Allures	3:34
16.	"Dinah-Moe Humm"	Over-Nite Sensation	6:02
17.	"Disco Boy"	Zoot Allures	4:19
18.	"200 Years Old (with Captain Beefheart)"	Bongo Fury	4:30

Disc two
No.	Title	Original release	Length
1.	"I'm the Slime"	Over-Nite Sensation	2:35
2.	"Be in My Video"	Them or Us	3:37
3.	"I Don't Even Care" (Zappa, Watson)	Frank Zappa Meets the Mothers of Prevention	3:48
4.	"Can't Afford No Shoes"	One Size Fits All	2:38
5.	"Heavenly Bank Account"	You Are What You Is	3:16
6.	"Cocaine Decisions"	The Man from Utopia	2:52
7.	"Dumb All Over"	You Are What You Is	4:03
8.	"Promiscuous"	Broadway the Hard Way	2:03
9.	"Thing-Fish Intro"	Thing-Fish (1984) under the title "Prologue"	2:56
10.	"The Central Scrutinizer"	Joe's Garage, Act I	2:50
11.	"Porn Wars Deluxe"	Previously Unreleased	25:51
12.	"Tinsel Town Rebellion"	Tinseltown Rebellion	3:43
13.	"Jesus Thinks You're a Jerk"	Broadway the Hard Way	9:18
