= Zappa '88: The Last U.S. Show =

Live album by Frank Zappa
- Released: June 18, 2021
- Recorded: March 25, 1988 (except "Stairway to Heaven" recorded March 23 and "Whipping Post" recorded March 16)
- Venues: Nassau Coliseum (Uniondale, New York), Towson Center (Towson, Maryland), Civic Center (Providence, Rhode Island)
- Genres: Comedy rock; progressive rock; experimental rock; jazz-fusion
- Length: 150:07
- Label: Zappa Records
- Producers: Frank Zappa, Ahmet Zappa & Joe Travers

Frank Zappa chronology
Zappa (2020)	Zappa '88: The Last U.S. Show (2021)	The Mothers 1971 (2022)

Zappa '88: The Last U.S. Show is a live album released June 18, 2021, by Frank Zappa. It contains mostly previously unreleased recordings of the last concert he would ever play in the US at the Nassau Coliseum in Uniondale, New York.

== Content ==
The album was released as a double CD and a quadruple LP. Besides Zappa originals it includes covers such as "Stairway to Heaven", "Whipping Post", and a medley of Beatles songs consisting of "Norwegian Wood (This Bird Has Flown)", "Lucy in the Sky with Diamonds", and "Strawberry Fields Forever" with changed lyrics to reflect a recent sex scandal involving Televangelist Jimmy Swaggart as well as a standalone cover of "I Am the Walrus". There were also two new songs written and recorded for the tour, "Jesus Thinks You’re A Jerk" and "When The Lie’s So Big", as well as pieces by Bartók and Stravinsky. In the opening track "We Are Doing Voter Registration Here" Zappa is heard encouraging audience members to register to vote in the forthcoming US election, and someone is heard registering on stage. The tracks "When The Lie's So Big" and the cover of "America The Beautiful" from this concert were previously released in the 2016 compilation album "Frank Zappa for President". While the majority of the album features the Nassau concert, "Stairway to Heaven" was taken from a performance in Towson, Maryland on March 23, 1988, while "Whipping Post" was recorded in Providence, Rhode Island on March 16, 1988.

== Track listing ==
Disc one
No.	Title	Length
1.	""We Are Doing Voter Registration Here""	7:00
2.	"The Black Page (New Age Version)"	7:12
3.	"I Ain’t Got No Heart"	1:59
4.	"Love of My Life"	2:14
5.	"Inca Roads"	8:44
6.	"Sharleena"	6:22
7.	"Who Needs the Peace Corps?"	2:29
8.	"I Left My Heart in San Francisco"	0:35
9.	"Dickie's Such an Asshole"	6:01
10.	"When the Lie's So Big"	3:38
11.	"Jesus Thinks You're a Jerk"	8:47
12.	"Sofa #1"	2:45
13.	"One Man, One Vote"	2:38
14.	"Happy Birthday, Chad!"	1:24
15.	"Packard Goose Pt. I"	2:56
16.	"Royal March from "L'Histoire Du Soldat""	1:17
17.	"Theme from the Bartok Piano Concerto #3"	1:20
18.	"Packard Goose Pt. II"	2:03
19.	"The Torture Never Stops Pt. I"	5:09
20.	"Theme from "Bonanza""	0:36

Disc two
No.	Title	Length
1.	"Lonesome Cowboy Burt"	4:59
2.	"The Torture Never Stops Pt. II"	7:29
3.	"City of Tiny Lites"	9:21
4.	"Pound for a Brown"	10:56
5.	"The Beatles Medley"	9:19
6.	"Peaches en Regalia"	3:36
7.	"Stairway to Heaven"	10:00
8.	"I Am the Walrus"	3:37
9.	"Whipping Post"	6:18
10.	"Bolero"	5:30
11.	"America the Beautiful"	3:58

== Personnel ==
- Frank Zappa – lead guitar, Synclavier, vocals
- Mike Keneally – guitar, synth, vocals
- Scott Thunes – electric bass, Minimoog
- Ike Willis – rhythm guitar, synth, vocals
- Chad Wackerman – drums, electronic percussion
- Ed Mann – vibraphone, marimba, electronic percussion
- Robert Martin – keyboards, vocals
- Walt Fowler – trumpet, flugelhorn, synth
- Bruce Fowler – trombone
- Paul Carman – soprano, alto & baritone saxophone
- Albert Wing – tenor saxophone
- Kurt McGettrick – baritone & bass saxophone

== Charts ==
Chart performance for Zappa '88: The Last U.S. Show
Chart (2021)	Peak position
Austrian Albums (Ö3 Austria)	19
Belgian Albums (Ultratop Flanders)	21
Belgian Albums (Ultratop Wallonia)	106
Dutch Albums (Album Top 100)	13
Finnish Albums (Suomen virallinen lista)	44
German Albums (Offizielle Top 100)	9
Italian Albums (FIMI)	82
Swiss Albums (Schweizer Hitparade)	8
