= You Can't Do That on Stage Anymore, Vol. 4 =

Live album by Frank Zappa
- Released: June 14, 1991
- Recorded: Various locations, 1969 – 1988
- Genre: Hard rock; progressive rock; art rock; comedy rock
- Length: 134:03
- Label: Rykodisc
- Producer: Frank Zappa

Frank Zappa chronology
Make a Jazz Noise Here (1991)	You Can't Do That on Stage Anymore, Vol. 4 (1991)	You Can't Do That on Stage Anymore, Vol. 5 (1992)

Professional ratings
Review scores
Source	Rating
AllMusic	4.5/5 stars

You Can't Do That on Stage Anymore, Vol. 4 is a two-CD set of live recordings by Frank Zappa, recorded between 1969 and 1988, and released in 1991.

== Track listing ==
All tracks are written by Frank Zappa, except where noted.

Disc one
No.	Title	Recording date and venue	Length
1.	"Little Rubber Girl" (Zappa, Denny Walley)	Bismarck Theater, November 23, 1984 (intro); The Palladium, October 31, 1978 (rest of song)	2:56
2.	"Stick Together"	Queen Elizabeth Theatre, December 18, 1984	2:04
3.	"My Guitar Wants to Kill Your Mama"	Universal Amphitheater, December 23, 1984	3:19
4.	"Willie the Pimp"	Universal Amphitheater, December 23, 1984	2:06
5.	"Montana"	The Roxy Theatre, December 9, 1973 (early show); Universal Amphitheater, December 23, 1984	5:46
6.	"Brown Moses"	Universal Amphitheater, December 23, 1984	2:37
7.	"The Evil Prince" (This is not the song "That Evil Prince" from Thing-Fish, but the "Somewhere over there..." segment from "The 'Torchum' Never Stops", on the same album.)	Queen Elizabeth Theatre, December 18, 1984; Hammersmith Odeon, September 24–26, 1984 (guitar solo)	7:11
8.	"Approximate"	Stadio Communale, July 8, 1982	1:49
9.	"Love of My Life" (Frank Zappa, Ray Collins)	Mudd Club, May 8, 1980	1:58
10.	"Let's Move to Cleveland – Solos (1984)" (featuring Archie Shepp)	Fine Arts Center Concert Hall, October 28, 1984; The Roxy, December 9, 1973 (early show) solos from 1984	7:10
11.	"You Call That Music?"	McMillin Theater, February 14, 1969	4:07
12.	"Pound for a Brown – Solos (1978)"	The Palladium, October 28, 1978	6:29
13.	"The Black Page (1984)"	Queen Elizabeth Theatre, December 18, 1984; The Pier, August 26, 1984 (guitar solo)	5:14
14.	"Take Me Out to the Ball Game" (Jack Norworth, Albert Von Tilzer)	Pabellón Municipal de Deportes La Casilla, Spain May 13, 1988	3:01
15.	"Filthy Habits"	Pabellón Municipal de Deportes La Casilla, May 13, 1988; Le Summum, May 19, 1988	5:39
16.	"The Torture Never Stops – Original Version" (vocal by Captain Beefheart)	Armadillo World Headquarters, May 21, 1975	9:14

Disc two
No.	Title	Recording date and venue	Length
1.	"Church Chat"	Parc des Expositions, France June 22, 1982	1:59
2.	"Stevie's Spanking"	Hammersmith Odeon, June 18–19, 1982; Ex Mattatorio do Testaccio, July 9, 1982	10:50
3.	"Outside Now"	Tower Theater, November 10, 1984	6:09
4.	"Disco Boy"	Olympiahalle, June 26, 1982	2:59
5.	"Teen-Age Wind"	Olympiahalle, June 26, 1982	1:54
6.	"Truck Driver Divorce"	Hammersmith Odeon, September 24–26, 1984; Paramount Theatre, December 17, 1984; Olympiahalle, June 26, 1982 (guitar solo)	4:46
7.	"Florentine Pogen"	Kulttuuritalo, September 22, 1974; Hammersmith Odeon, February 18, 1979	5:09
8.	"Tiny Sick Tears" (a parody of ? and the Mysterians song "96 Tears")	The Factory, February 13, 1969	4:29
9.	"Smell My Beard" (George Duke, Zappa)	Capitol Theatre, November 8, 1974	4:30
10.	"The Booger Man" (Duke, Napoleon Brock, Zappa)	Capitol Theatre, November 8, 1974	2:46
11.	"Carolina Hard-Core Ecstasy"	Paramount Theatre, December 17, 1984	6:27
12.	"Are You Upset?"	Fillmore East, February 21, 1969	1:29
13.	"Little Girl of Mine" (Morris Levy, Herbert Cox)	Royal Oak Music Theatre August 21, 1984 (late show)	1:40
14.	"The Closer You Are" (Earl Lewis, Morgan Robinson)	Bayfront Center Arena, December 1, 1984 (1st part); Detroit, Michigan August 24, 1984 (2nd part)	2:04
15.	"Johnny Darling" (Louis Statton, Johnny Statton)	Detroit, Michigan August 24, 1984	0:51
16.	"No, No Cherry" (L. Caesar, J. Gray)	Detroit, Michigan August 24, 1984	1:25
17.	"The Man from Utopia" (Donald Woods, Doris Woods)	Stadio Comunale, July 8, 1982	1:15
18.	"Mary Lou" (Obie Jessie)	Stadio Comunale, July 8, 1982	2:15

== Personnel ==
=== Musicians ===
- Frank Zappa – vocals on tracks 1–1, 1–2, 1–4 to 1–6, 1–8, 1–9, 2–4 to 2–7, 2–8 (sensitive vocal), 2–10 to 2–12, 2–16, and 2–18; lead guitar on tracks 1–4, 1–5, 1–7, 1–10 to 1–16, 2–1 (1st solo), 2–2, 2–3, 2–6, 2–07, 2–10, and 2–11
- Ray White – guitar on tracks 1–2, 1–4 to 1–9, 1–13, 2–1 to 2–6, 2–11, 2–16, and 2–18; vocals on tracks 1–2, 1–4 to 1–9, 2–1 to 2–6, 2–11, 2–16, and 2–18
- Ike Willis – guitar on tracks 1–2, 1–4 to 1–7, 1–9, 1–10, 1–13, 1–15, 2–3, 2–6, 2–11, and 2–16; vocals on tracks 1–2, 1–4 to 1–7, 1–9, 1–14, 2–3, 2–6, 2–7, 2–11, and 2–16
- Steve Vai – guitar on tracks 1–8, 2–1 (2nd solo), 2–2, 2–4, 2–5, and 2–18
- Lowell George – guitar on tracks 1–11, 2–8, and 2–12; vocals on tracks 2–8, and 2–12
- Mike Keneally – guitar on tracks 1–14, and 1–15
- Warren Cuccurullo – guitar on track 2–7
- Denny Walley – slide guitar on tracks 1–12, 1–16, and 2–7; vocals on tracks 1–1, and 2–7
- Bobby Martin – keyboards on tracks 1–2, 1–4 to 1–8, 1–10, 1–13 to 1–15, 2–1 to 2–6, 2–11, 2–16, and 2–18; saxophone on tracks 1–2, 1–4 to 1–8, 1–10, 1–13, 2–1 to 2–6, 2–11, 2–16, and 2–18; vocals on tracks 1–2, 1–4 to 1–8, 2–2 to 2–6, 2–11, 2–16, and 2–18
- Allan Zavod – keyboards on tracks 1–2, 1–4 to 1–7, 1–10, 1–13, 2–3, 2–6, 2–11, and 2–16
- Tommy Mars – keyboards on tracks 1–1, 1–8, 1–9, 1–12, 2–1, 2–2, 2–4, 2–5, 2–7, and 2–18; vocals on tracks 1–8, 1–12 (2nd solo), 2–1, 2–2, 2–4, 2–5, 2–7, and 2–18
- Don Preston – keyboards on tracks 1–11, 2–8, and 2–12
- George Duke – keyboards on tracks 1–5, 1–16, and 2–10; vocals on tracks 1–5, and 2–10
- Peter Wolf – keyboards on tracks 1–1, and Minimoog solo on track 1–12
- Mike Keneally – synthesizer on tracks 1–14, and 1–15
- Don Preston – synthesizer on tracks 2–8, and 2–12
- Scott Thunes – bass on tracks 1–2, 1–4 to 1–8, 1–10, 1–13 to 1–15, 2–1 to 2–6, 2–11, 2–16, and 2–18
- Arthur Barrow – bass on tracks 1–1, 1–9, 1–12, and 2–7
- Roy Estrada – bass on tracks 1–11, 2–8, and 2–12; vocals on tracks 1–11, 2–8, and 2–12; keyboards on track 1–9
- Tom Fowler – bass on tracks 1–5, 1–16, and 2–10
- Patrick O'Hearn – bass on tracks 1–1, and 1–12; vocals on track 1–1
- Chad Wackerman – drums on tracks 1–2, 1–4 to 1–8, 1–10, 1–13 to 1–15, 2–1 to 2–6, 2–11, 2–16, and 2–18
- Arthur Dyer Tripp III – drums on tracks 1–11, 2–8, and 2–12
- Vinnie Colaiuta – drums on tracks 1–1, 1–12, and 2–7
- Jimmy Carl Black – drums on tracks 1–11, 2–8, and 2–12
- Chester Thompson – drums on tracks 1–5, and 2–10
- Ralph Humphrey – drums on track 1–5
- David Logeman – drums on track 1–9
- Terry Bozzio – drums on track 1–16
- Captain Beefheart – harmonica and vocals on track 1–16
- Ian Underwood – alto saxophone on tracks 2–8, and 2–12; clarinet on track 1–11
- Paul Carman – alto saxophone on tracks 1–14, and 1–15
- Napoleon Murphy Brock – saxophone on tracks 1–5, 1–16, and 2–10; vocals on tracks 1–5, and 2–10
- Bunk Gardner – tenor saxophone on tracks 1–11, 2–8, and 2–12
- Albert Wing – tenor saxophone on tracks 1–14, and 1–15
- Archie Shepp – tenor saxophone solo on track 1–10
- Kurt McGettrick – baritone saxophone on tracks 1–14, and 1–15
- Motorhead Sherwood – baritone saxophone on tracks 1–11, 2–8, and 2–12
- Buzz Gardner – trumpet on tracks 1–11, 2–8, and 2–12
- Walt Fowler – trumpet on tracks 1–14, and 1–15; vocals on track 1–14
- Bruce Fowler – trombone on tracks 1–5, and 1–14 to 1–16
- Ed Mann – percussion on tracks 1–1, 1–8, 1–12, 1–14, 1–15, 2–1, 2–2, 2–4, 2–5, 2–7, and 2–18
- Ruth Underwood – percussion on tracks 1–5, and 2–10
- Dave Samuels – percussion soloist on vibes on track 1–11

=== Production ===
- Frank Zappa – producer, liner notes, editing
- Bob Stone – remix engineer, and engineering supervision
- Kathleen Philpott – package design
