= Make a Jazz Noise Here =

Live album by Frank Zappa
- Released: June 4, 1991
- Recorded: February 9 – June 7, 1988
- Genres: Jazz fusion; progressive rock; art rock
- Length: 137:00
- Label: Barking Pumpkin
- Producer: Frank Zappa

Frank Zappa chronology
The Best Band You Never Heard in Your Life (1991)	Make a Jazz Noise Here (1991)	You Can't Do That on Stage Anymore, Vol. 4 (1991)

Professional ratings
Review scores
Source	Rating
Allmusic	3.5/5 stars

Make a Jazz Noise Here is a live double album by Frank Zappa. It was first released in June 1991, and was the third Zappa album to be compiled from recordings from his 1988 world tour, following Broadway the Hard Way (1988) and The Best Band You Never Heard in Your Life (1991). The album's cover art was made by Larry Grossman.

== Album content ==
The album consists largely of instrumentals. Besides many of Zappa's own compositions, there are also some arrangements of Igor Stravinsky and Béla Bartók themes by his bassist, Scott Thunes. The album showcases Mike Keneally on guitar and keyboards. The drummer is Chad Wackerman, a highly regarded musician in the jazz world (he has frequently played with jazz guitarist Allan Holdsworth). A notable contribution to the mix is made by the brass section of the group: Walt Fowler (trumpet), Bruce Fowler (trombone), and saxophonists Paul Carman, Albert Wing and Kurt McGettrick. Ike Willis plays guitar and sings, along with singer/keyboardist Robert 'Bobby' Martin. Ed Mann provides all the percussion and various other sounds, complementing the addition of the Synclavier, which Zappa brought on tour for the first and only time (In the midst of the 1988 tour, Zappa fired the bulk of his band and cancelled the remaining tour primarily due to infighting between specific band members). In the liner notes, Zappa states that the album features no overdubs.

== Track listing ==
All tracks are written by Frank Zappa, except where noted.

Disc one
No.	Title	Recording venue(s) and date(s)	Length
1.	"Stink-Foot"	Orpheum Theater, February 20, 1988; Mid-Hudson Civic Center, February 23, 1988; The Ahoy, May 4, 1988	7:39
2.	"When Yuppies Go to Hell"	Sporthalle, May 28, 1988; Sporthalle, April 14, 1988; Stadthalle, April 24, 1988; Brighton Centre, April 16, 1988; Burlington Memorial Auditorium, March 12, 1988; Warner Theatre, February 9, 1988	13:28
3.	"Fire and Chains"	Warner Theatre, February 9, 1988	5:04
4.	"Let's Make the Water Turn Black"	The Ahoy, May 3, 1988	1:36
5.	"Harry, You're a Beast"	The Ahoy, May 3, 1988	0:47
6.	"The Orange County Lumber Truck"	The Ahoy, May 3, 1988	0:41
7.	"Oh No"	Wembley Arena, April 19, 1988; The Ahoy, May 3, 1988	4:43
8.	"Theme from Lumpy Gravy"	The Ahoy, May 3, 1988	1:11
9.	"Eat That Question"	PalaEur, June 7, 1988	1:54
10.	"Black Napkins"	Stadthalle, May 8, 1988	6:56
11.	"Big Swifty"	Rudi-Sedlmayer-Halle, May 9, 1988; Wembley Arena, April 18, 1988; The Ahoy, May 3, 1988	11:12
12.	"King Kong"	Rudi-Sedlmayer-Halle, May 9, 1988; Cleveland Music Hall, March 5, 1988; Royal Oak Music Theatre, February 26, 1988	13:04
13.	"Star Wars Won't Work"	Beethovensaal, May 24, 1988	3:40

Disc two
No.	Title	Recording venue(s) and date(s)	Length
1.	"The Black Page (new age version)"	Tower Theater, February 12, 1988; Le Summum, May 19, 1988; Palasport, June 5, 1988	6:45
2.	"T'Mershi Duween"	Beethovensaal, May 24, 1988	1:42
3.	"Dupree's Paradise"	Rosengarten/Mozartsaal, May 25, 1988; Beethovensaal, May 24, 1988; Palasport, June 5, 1988	8:34
4.	"City of Tiny Lights"	Palasport, June 5, 1988	8:01
5.	"Royal March from L'Histoire du Soldat" (Igor Stravinsky)	Syria Mosque, February 25, 1988	0:59
6.	"Theme from the Bartok Piano Concerto #3" (Béla Bartók)	Civic Center, March 13, 1988	0:43
7.	"Sinister Footwear 2nd mvt."	Rosengarten/Mozartsaal, May 25, 1988; The Ahoy, May 3, 1988; Allentown Memorial Hall, March 19, 1988; Warner Theatre, February 10, 1988	6:39
8.	"Stevie's Spanking"	Allentown Memorial Hall, March 19, 1988	4:25
9.	"Alien Orifice"	Rosengarten/Mozartsaal, May 25, 1988; Palasport, June 3, 1988	4:15
10.	"Cruisin' for Burgers"	The Ahoy, May 4, 1988; Olympen, April 26, 1988	8:27
11.	"Advance Romance"	Burlingon Memorial Auditorium, March 12, 1988; Pabellón Municipal de Deportes La Casilla, May 13, 1988; Palasport, June 6, 1988 (guitar solo)	7:43
12.	"Strictly Genteel"	Prado de San Sebastián, May 15, 1988	6:36

== Personnel ==
=== Musicians ===
- Frank Zappa – lead guitar, synth, vocal
- Ike Willis – rhythm guitar, synth, vocal
- Mike Keneally – rhythm guitar, synth, vocal
- Bobby Martin – keyboards, vocal
- Ed Mann – vibes, marimba, electronic percussion
- Walt Fowler – trumpet, flugel horn, synth
- Bruce Fowler – trombone
- Paul Carman – alto saxophone, soprano saxophone, baritone saxophone
- Albert Wing – tenor saxophone
- Kurt McGettrick – baritone saxophone, contrabass clarinet
- Scott Thunes – electric bass, Minimoog
- Chad Wackerman – drums, electronic percussion
- Sampled voices of Senator Hawkins, Senator Holings and Johnny "Guitar" Watson

=== Production ===
- Frank Zappa – producing, arranging, compilation, editing
- Bob Stone – engineering
