= The Best Band You Never Heard in Your Life =

Live album by Frank Zappa
- Released: April 16, 1991
- Recorded: February 14 – June 6, 1988, at Munich; Würzburg; Allentown, Pennsylvania; Rotterdam; Brighton; Strasbourg; Binghamton, New York; Grenoble; Linz; Modena; Philadelphia; London; Pittsburgh; Teaneck, New Jersey; Poughkeepsie, New York; Syracuse, New York; Detroit; Vienna; and Florence
- Genres: Hard rock; progressive rock; jazz fusion; experimental rock
- Length: 131:13
- Label: Barking Pumpkin
- Producer: Frank Zappa

Frank Zappa chronology
You Can't Do That on Stage Anymore, Vol. 3 (1989)	The Best Band You Never Heard in Your Life (1991)	Make a Jazz Noise Here (1991)

Professional ratings
Review scores
Source	Rating
Allmusic	4.5/5 stars

The Best Band You Never Heard in Your Life is a double-disc live album by American musician Frank Zappa, released in 1991. The album was one of four that were recorded during the 1988 world tour; the other three were Broadway the Hard Way (released in 1988), Make a Jazz Noise Here (released in 1991), and Zappa '88: The Last U.S. Show (posthumously released in 2021).

Each of the first three accounts of the 1988 tour has a different emphasis: Broadway the Hard Way mainly consists of new compositions; Make a Jazz Noise Here is a sampler of classic Zappa tunes, most of them instrumental; and The Best Band... devotes itself to cover songs. Some of these are unlikely, such as "Stairway to Heaven" by Led Zeppelin, while many are from Zappa's extensive back catalogue. His mid-1970s output is emphasized in the selection, but there is also some material from the Mothers of Invention's late 1960s recordings and one song ("Lonesome Cowboy Burt") from 200 Motels. It was re-issued in 1995 and 2012 along with his entire catalogue.

The album is also notable for its extended section of potshots against American Pentecostal televangelist Jimmy Swaggart, who had then just confessed to transgressions with a prostitute on live television; the speech was later dubbed his "I have sinned" speech. "Lonesome Cowboy Burt", "More Trouble Every Day" and "Penguin in Bondage" feature entirely rewritten lyrics to capitalize on and satirize the scandal.

== Cover artwork ==
The album cover with the photograph removed. Also used on the 2012 Zappa Records reissue.

The 1992 Japanese album cover by Cal Schenkel. Also used on the 1995 Rykodisc reissue.

The original album simply featured a photograph of Frank Zappa and his band against a black background with blue lettering, but upon discovering that the photograph had been used without the permission of the photographer, Bruce Malone, Zappa simply continued issuing the cover with the photograph replaced with an empty black space.

When the album was released in Japan by MSI (Music Scene International) in 1992, it featured artwork created by long-time Zappa artist Cal Schenkel. The Japanese kanji at the top of the sign on this version do not together form any meaningful sentence to a speaker of Japanese, but can be read with the on readings of fu-ran-ku-za-pa, an approximation of Frank Zappa in Japanese sounds.

Schenkel used characters from his artwork on the cover of Zappa's 1972 release The Grand Wazoo, such as Stu (AKA Uncle Meat) and a man playing a Mystery Horn. In addition, there is a red sofa, that while not an exact duplicate, is reminiscent of the red sofa from his art on Zappa's 1975 One Size Fits All. Schenkel's artwork was re-used when the album was remastered and reissued worldwide in 1995 by Rykodisc. In 2012, when the album was reissued for a second time, the cover was reverted to the version featuring a blank space in place of the photograph.

== Track listing ==
All tracks are written by Frank Zappa, except where noted.

Disc one
No.	Title	Recording venue and dates	Length
1.	"Heavy Duty Judy"	Carl-Diem-Halle, April 22, 1988; The Ahoy, May 3, 1988	6:04
2.	"Ring of Fire" (Merle Kilgore, June Carter)	Carl-Diem-Halle, April 22, 1988	2:00
3.	"Cosmik Debris"	Carl-Diem-Halle, April 22, 1988	4:32
4.	"Find Her Finer"	Rudi-Sedlmayer-Halle, May 9, 1988	2:42
5.	"Who Needs the Peace Corps?"	Carl-Diem-Halle, April 22, 1988	2:40
6.	"I Left My Heart in San Francisco" (George C. Cory Jr., Douglas Cross)	Carl-Diem-Halle, April 22, 1988	0:36
7.	"Zomby Woof"	Rudi-Sedlmayer-Halle, May 9, 1988; Muhlenberg College's Memorial Hall, March 19, 1988	5:41
8.	"Boléro" (Maurice Ravel)	The Ahoy, May 3, 1988	5:19
9.	"Zoot Allures"	Brighton Centre, April 16, 1988	7:07
10.	"Mr. Green Genes"	Hall Tivoli, May 23, 1988	3:40
11.	"Florentine Pogen"	Hall Tivoli, May 23, 1988; Palasport, June 6, 1988 (guitar solo)	7:11
12.	"Andy"	Stadthalle, May 26, 1988	5:51
13.	"Inca Roads"	Stadthalle, May 8, 1988; Carl-Diem-Halle, April 22, 1988	8:19
14.	"Sofa No. 1"	Beethovensaal, May 24, 1988	2:49

Disc two
No.	Title	Recording venue and dates	Length
1.	"Purple Haze" (Jimi Hendrix)	Sporthalle, May 28, 1988	2:27
2.	"Sunshine of Your Love" (Pete Brown, Jack Bruce, Eric Clapton)	Sporthalle, May 28, 1988	2:30
3.	"Let's Move to Cleveland"	Palasport, June 5, 1988; Le Zenith, May 18, 1988	5:51
4.	"When Irish Eyes Are Smiling" (Ernest Ball, George Graff, Chancellor Olcott)	Broome County Arena, March 17, 1988	0:46
5.	""Godfather Part II" Theme" (Nino Rota)	Broome County Arena, March 17, 1988	0:30
6.	"A Few Moments with Brother A. West" (Brother A. West, Zappa)	Tower Theater, February 14, 1988	4:00
7.	"The Torture Never Stops, Pt. 1"	Wembley Arena, April 19, 1988; Carl-Diem-Halle, April 22, 1988	5:19
8.	"Theme from "Bonanza"" (Ray Evans, Jay Livingston)	Wembley Arena, April 19, 1988	0:28
9.	"Lonesome Cowboy Burt" (Swaggart version)	Syria Mosque, February 25, 1988	4:54
10.	"The Torture Never Stops, Pt. 2"	Rothman Centre, March 20, 1988	10:47
11.	"More Trouble Every Day" (Swaggart version)	Mid Hudson Civic Centre, February 23, 1988	5:28
12.	"Penguin in Bondage" (Swaggart version)	Mid Hudson Civic Centre, February 23, 1988	5:05
13.	"The Eric Dolphy Memorial Barbecue"	Royal Oak Music Theatre, February 28, 1988; Landmark Theatre, March 21, 1988; Stadthalle, May 8, 1988	9:18
14.	"Stairway to Heaven" (Jimmy Page, Robert Plant)	Stadthalle, May 8, 1988; Palasport, June 6, 1988; Wembley Arena, April 18, 1988	9:19

The European re-releases of this album omit "Bolero" due to an objection from the rights-holders of the piece.

== Personnel ==
=== Musicians ===
- Frank Zappa – lead guitar, computer-synth, vocal
- Ike Willis – rhythm guitar, synth, vocal
- Mike Keneally – rhythm guitar, synth, vocal
- Bobby Martin – keyboards, vocal
- Ed Mann – vibes, marimba, electronic percussion
- Walt Fowler – trumpet, flugel horn, synth
- Bruce Fowler – trombone
- Paul Carman – alto sax, soprano sax, baritone sax
- Albert Wing – tenor saxophone
- Kurt McGettrick – baritone sax, bass sax, contrabass clarinet
- Scott Thunes – electric bass, Mini-moog
- Chad Wackerman – drums, electronic percussion

=== Production ===
- Frank Zappa – production, arranging, compilation, editing
- Bob Stone – engineering
