= Does Humor Belong in Music? (album) =

Live album

Live album by Frank Zappa
- Released: January 27, 1986
- Recorded: October 8 – December 23, 1984
- Genres: Hard rock; progressive rock; art rock; comedy rock
- Length: 61:41
- Label: EMI
- Producer: Frank Zappa

Frank Zappa chronology
Frank Zappa Meets the Mothers of Prevention (1985)	Does Humor Belong in Music? (1986)	The Old Masters Box II (1986)

Alternative cover
- Cover for the 1995 reissue, by Cal Schenkel.

Professional ratings
Review scores
Source	Rating
Allmusic	3/5 stars

Does Humor Belong in Music? is a live album by American musician Frank Zappa. The title comes from a question Zappa was asked while being interviewed by Dave Tarbert (The Man on Music) a reporter from television station WEWS in Cleveland, Ohio.

== Releases ==
The album features concert recordings from October–December 1984. It was the first album by Zappa to be released on CD only (although it was bootlegged on vinyl for listeners who did not own CD players). In 1995, it was reissued by Rykodisc in an extremely remixed form, with significantly improved dynamic range and new artwork. The 1995 edition includes an extra minute of percussion effects during "Let's Move to Cleveland" that had been excised from the EMI edition. In 2012 the (remixed) album was reissued as a part the Zappa Reissue Program. It was a part of "The 4th set of 12" released on October 30, 2012 and featured the original artwork without the white stain in the bottom left.

A home video (later reissued on DVD) of the same name was released. "Zoot Allures", "Tinsel Town Rebellion", "Trouble Every Day" and "Whipping Post" appear on both, but are different performances. Fragments of "Hot-Plate Heaven" also appear in the video (with only the verses of the song left intact). The cover art of the original CD release and video release, however, are the same.

== Track listing ==
All tracks are written by Frank Zappa, except where noted.

No.	Title	Recording venue(s) and date(s)	Length
1.	"Zoot Allures"	Hammersmith Odeon, September 25, 1984; Providence Civic Center, October 26, 1984 (guitar solo)	5:26
2.	"Tinsel-Town Rebellion"	Bismarck Theater, November 23, 1984; Queen Elizabeth Theater, December 18, 1984 (ending)	4:44
3.	"Trouble Every Day"	Bayfront Center Arena, December 1, 1984; Hammersmith Odeon, September 25, 1984 (solo)	5:31
4.	"Penguin in Bondage"	Bayfront Center Arena, December 1, 1984; Queen Elizabeth Theater, December 18, 1984 (solo)	6:45
5.	"Hot-Plate Heaven at the Green Hotel"	Queen Elizabeth Theater, December 18, 1984	6:43
6.	"What's New in Baltimore"	Universal Amphitheater, December 23, 1984; Tower Theater, November 10, 1984	4:48
7.	"Cock-Suckers' Ball" (Traditional, arranged by Frank Zappa)	Universal Amphitheater, December 23, 1984	1:05
8.	"WPLJ" (Ray Dobard)	Universal Amphitheater, December 23, 1984	1:31
9.	"Let's Move to Cleveland"	Universal Amphitheater, December 23, 1984 (Intro and out-chorus); Bayfront Center Arena, December 1, 1984 (Piano solo); Queen Elizabeth Theatre, December 18, 1984 (Drum solo); Fine Arts Center Concert Hall, October 28, 1984 (Guitar solo)	15:43
10.	"Whipping Post" (Gregg Allman)	Universal Amphitheater, December 23, 1984	8:23

== Personnel ==
- Frank Zappa – lead guitar, vocals
- Ray White – rhythm guitar, vocals
- Ike Willis – rhythm guitar, vocals
- Bobby Martin – keyboards, saxophone, vocal, french horn
- Allan Zavod – keyboards, solo on "Cleveland"
- Scott Thunes – bass guitar
- Chad Wackerman – drums, solo on "Cleveland"
- Dweezil Zappa – lead guitar on "Whipping Post"

=== Production ===
- Frank Zappa – producer, arranger
- Mark Pinske – recording engineer
- Thom Ehle – recording engineer
- Bob Stone – remix engineer
- Ebet Roberts – cover photography
- Mark Matsuno – design
- Cal Schenkel – cover art for 1995 CD
- Diva Zappa – photography for 2012 CD
