= Does Humor Belong in Music? =

Does Humor Belong in Music? may refer to:

- Does Humor Belong in Music? (album), a live album by Frank Zappa
- Does Humor Belong in Music? (video), a Frank Zappa concert video
