= Frank Zappa Meets the Mothers of Prevention =

Studio album with live elements by Frank Zappa
- Released: November 21, 1985
- Recorded: November 1981–September 1985
- Studio: UMRK (Los Angeles)
- Genres: Electronic; experimental; sound collage
- Length: 37:31
- Label: Barking Pumpkin
- Producer: Frank Zappa

Frank Zappa chronology
The Old Masters Box I (1985)	Frank Zappa Meets the Mothers of Prevention (1985)	Does Humor Belong in Music? (1986)

Professional ratings
Review scores
Source	Rating
AllMusic	3/5 stars

Frank Zappa Meets the Mothers of Prevention is the forty-fourth album by American musician Frank Zappa, released in 1985. It was originally released in two slightly different versions in the US and Europe.

The album's title is a reference to the lobby group, the Parents Music Resource Center (PMRC), who were campaigning to require record companies to put warning stickers on albums they considered offensive, and to Zappa's former band, the Mothers of Invention.

== Release ==
Following distribution problems with Zappa's previous album Thing-Fish (1984), which former Barking Pumpkin distributor MCA Records refused to distribute, Zappa made a deal with EMI Records, which would allow Them or Us and Thing-Fish (both 1984) to be distributed by Capitol Records in the United States.

Zappa wrote a "warning/guarantee" which appeared on the inner sleeves of these albums, as well as Frank Zappa Meets the Mothers of Prevention. It read:

WARNING/GUARANTEE:
This album contains material which a truly free society would neither fear nor suppress.
In some socially retarded areas, religious fanatics and ultra-conservative political organizations violate your First Amendment Rights by attempting to censor rock & roll albums. We feel that this is un-Constitutional and un-American.
As an alternative to these government-supported programs (designed to keep you docile and ignorant). Barking Pumpkin is pleased to provide stimulating digital audio entertainment for those of you who have outgrown the ordinary.
The language and concepts contained herein are GUARANTEED NOT TO CAUSE ETERNAL TORMENT IN THE PLACE WHERE THE GUY WITH THE HORNS AND POINTED STICK CONDUCTS HIS BUSINESS. This guarantee is as real as the threats of the video fundamentalists who use attacks on rock music in their attempt to transform America into a nation of check-mailing nincompoops (in the name of Jesus Christ).
If there is a hell, its fires wait for them, not us.

The liner notes also contained a quote from Senator Fritz Hollings, who testified during the PMRC hearings: "…if I could find some way constitutionally to do away with it [foul language in music], I would", as well as Zappa's oft-repeated liner notes request for his fans to register to vote.

The original US version of the album contains the track "Porn Wars" – a sound collage featuring excerpts from PMRC hearings. This track was omitted from non-US versions, and replaced with three other pieces: "I Don't Even Care", co-written by Zappa and Johnny "Guitar" Watson, and two instrumental tracks – "One Man, One Vote" (a Synclavier composition) and "H.R. 2911", which collates some of the backing music from "Porn Wars", without the PMRC hearing excerpts and other dialogue. The EMI CD (coupled with 1986's Jazz from Hell) only included the European Version. The original Rykodisc CDs added two of the three European tracks and shuffled around the running order. The 1995 Rykodisc remaster added the third European track after the same shuffled order.

== Track listing ==
=== US vinyl ===
All tracks are written by Frank Zappa, except where noted.

Side one
No.	Title	Length
1.	"We're Turning Again"	4:55
2.	"Alien Orifice"	4:03
3.	"Yo Cats" (Zappa, Tommy Mars)	3:31
4.	"What's New in Baltimore?"	5:21
Total length:		18:35

Side two
No.	Title	Length
5.	"Little Beige Sambo"	3:02
6.	"Porn Wars"	12:04
7.	"Aerobics in Bondage"	3:16
Total length:		18:56

=== UK vinyl ===
Side one
No.	Title	Length
1.	"We're Turning Again"	4:55
2.	"Alien Orifice"	4:03
3.	"Yo Cats" (Zappa, Tommy Mars)	3:31
4.	"What's New in Baltimore?"	5:21
Total length:		18:35

Side two
No.	Title	Length
5.	"I Don't Even Care" (Zappa, Johnny "Guitar" Watson)	4:39
6.	"One Man, One Vote"	2:35
7.	"H.R. 2911"	3:35
8.	"Little Beige Sambo"	3:02
9.	"Aerobics in Bondage"	3:16
Total length:		17:45

1995 CD reissue
No.	Title	Length
1.	"I Don't Even Care" (Zappa, Johnny "Guitar" Watson)	4:39
2.	"One Man, One Vote"	2:35
3.	"Little Beige Sambo"	3:02
4.	"Aerobics in Bondage"	3:16
5.	"We're Turning Again"	4:55
6.	"Alien Orifice"	4:10
7.	"Yo Cats" (Zappa, Tommy Mars)	3:33
8.	"What's New in Baltimore?"	5:20
9.	"Porn Wars"	12:03
10.	"H.R. 2911"	3:35
Total length:		47:17

== Personnel ==
- Frank Zappa – vocals, guitar, Synclavier, producer
- Johnny "Guitar" Watson – vocals, guitar on "I Don't Even Care"
- Ike Willis – vocals, guitar
- Ray White – vocals, guitar
- Bobby Martin – vocals, keyboards
- Steve Vai – guitar
- Tommy Mars – keyboards
- Scott Thunes – bass
- Chad Wackerman – drums
- Ed Mann – percussion
- Moon Zappa – vocals
- Dweezil Zappa – vocals
- John Danforth – voice excerpts on "Porn Wars"
- Fritz Hollings – voice excerpts on "Porn Wars"
- Slade Gorton – voice excerpts on "Porn Wars"
- Paul S. Trible, Jr. – voice excerpts on "Porn Wars"
- Paula Hawkins – voice excerpts on "Porn Wars"
- J. James Exon – voice excerpts on "Porn Wars"
- Al Gore – voice excerpts on "Porn Wars"
- Tipper Gore – voice excerpts on "Porn Wars"
- Bob Stone – engineer

== Charts ==
Album – Billboard (United States)

Year	Chart	Position
1986	Billboard 200	153
