= Guitar (Frank Zappa album) =

Live album by Frank Zappa
- Released: April 26, 1988
- Recorded: March 31, 1979 – December 18, 1984
- Genres: Instrumental rock; hard rock; jazz fusion; progressive rock
- Length: 83:39 (LP); 131:38 (CD)
- Labels: Barking Pumpkin (LP); Rykodisc (CD)
- Producer: Frank Zappa

Frank Zappa chronology
The Old Masters Box III (1987)	Guitar (1988)	You Can't Do That on Stage Anymore, Vol. 1 (1988)

Singles from Guitar
- 1. "Sexual Harassment in the Workplace" Released: 1988

Professional ratings
Review scores
Source	Rating
Allmusic	4/5 stars

Guitar is the fiftieth album by Frank Zappa, released in 1988. A live album, it is the follow-up to 1981's Shut Up 'n Play Yer Guitar; like that album it features Zappa's guitar solos excerpted from live performances, recorded between 1979 and 1984. It garnered Zappa his sixth Grammy nomination for "Best Rock Instrumental Performance".

== Background ==
Guitar was originally intended to be a 3-record box set like Shut Up 'n Play Yer Guitar, but Zappa decided, with this release, to start using compact discs as his primary distribution medium rather than records. As such, it was Zappa's first album to be released simultaneously on vinyl and CD. The double CD, released on Rykodisc in the US and Zappa Records in Europe, contained all 32 tracks for the intended 3-record box set, while the vinyl release was a double LP pared down to 19 tracks and released on Zappa's Barking Pumpkin label (US) and Zappa Records (EU).

Aside from "Watermelon in Easter Hay", "Sexual Harassment In The Workplace" and "Outside Now," all tracks were derived from performances of other songs, as on Shut Up 'n Play Your Guitar. Other solos were excerpted from "The Black Page", "Let's Move to Cleveland", "Drowning Witch", "Zoot Allures", "Whipping Post", "City of Tiny Lites", "Advance Romance", "Hot-Plate Heaven at the Green Hotel", "King Kong", "Easy Meat", "Ride My Face to Chicago", "Sharleena", "A Pound for a Brown on the Bus", and "Inca Roads".

Track names, though unrelated to the actual compositions, make many references to popular culture and world history. "Do Not Pass Go" refers to the Monopoly phrase that appears to prevent players from collecting a monetary bonus; "Jim & Tammy's Upper Room" recalls televangelists Jim Bakker and his wife Tammy Faye Messner; "Were We Ever Really Safe in San Antonio?", "Sunrise Redeemer" and "Hotel Atlanta Incidentals" are references to the locations of the venues in which the pieces were played; "Move It or Park It" is a colloquialism that could express frustration with an apprehensive driver of a motor vehicle; "Orrin Hatch on Skis" refers to Utah Republican Senator Orrin Hatch; "But Who Was Fulcanelli?" refers to an alias apparently used by a 19th-century French alchemist and author; "For Duane", one of Zappa's many readings of "Whipping Post", references Duane Allman; "GOA" is titled after the region of India; "Do Not Try This at Home" refers to the disclaimer often associated with dangerous or risky feats on television or video.

"Chalk Pie" was Zappa's planned title for a 1982 release of which the majority of its tracks eventually appeared on Ship Arriving Too Late to Save a Drowning Witch and The Man from Utopia.

"In-A-Gadda-Stravinsky" refers both to Iron Butterfly's "In-A-Gadda-Da-Vida" and 20th-century composer Igor Stravinsky, one of Zappa's influences. During the piece, bassist Scott Thunes plays the well-known motif from "In-A-Gadda-Da-Vida", while Zappa plays a line from Stravinsky's The Rite of Spring. "Taps" is also quoted by Thunes.

"Variations on Sinister #3", though derived from a version of "Easy Meat", gained its name from the interpolation of themes from "Theme from the 3rd Movement of Sinister Footwear" from You Are What You Is.

"Canadian Customs" almost certainly refers to the Canada Border Services Agency. Zappa is said to have experienced problems with the CBSA and created a routine around them with Napoleon Murphy Brock and Andre Lewis circa 1975.

"It Ain't Necessarily the Saint James Infirmary" is a portmanteau of "It Ain't Necessarily So", written by George and Ira Gershwin with libretto by DuBose Heyward for Porgy and Bess and "St. James Infirmary Blues", a composition with no officially recorded writer, famously recorded by Louis Armstrong and later by Cab Calloway. Guitar credits the latter to Joe Primrose, but the song's author is unverified. Both songs are quoted on the track.

The Real Frank Zappa Book, Zappa's autobiography, contains the following statement, which most likely accounts for the track name "Winos Do Not March":

I have a theory about beer: Consumption of it leads to pseudo-military behavior. Think about it-winos don't march.

Longer edits of "But Who Was Fulcanelli?" and "For Duane" and a shorter edit of "Things That Look Like Meat" appear on the 1987 compilation The Guitar World According to Frank Zappa. According to that album's liner notes, another of the tracks, "A Solo from Heidelberg", derived from "Yo' Mama", was originally intended to appear on Guitar.

Similar albums are Shut Up 'n Play Yer Guitar, Trance-Fusion, Frank Zappa Plays the Music of Frank Zappa: A Memorial Tribute, and The Guitar World According to Frank Zappa.

== Track listing ==
=== Original LP ===
All tracks are written by Frank Zappa.

Side one
No.	Title	Track source	Length
1.	"Sexual Harassment in the Workplace"	Fox Theatre, December 12, 1981	3:42
2.	"Republicans"	"Let's Move to Cleveland" - Tower Theater, November 10, 1984	5:08
3.	"Do Not Pass Go"	"Drowning Witch" - Hammersmith Odeon, June 19, 1982	3:37
4.	"That's Not Really Reggae"	"Whipping Post" - Hammersmith Odeon, September 25, 1984	3:17
5.	"When No One Was No One"	"Zoot Allures" - Sporthalle, May 21, 1982	4:41
Total length:			21:28

Side two
No.	Title	Track source	Length
6.	"Once Again, Without the Net"	"Let's Move to Cleveland" - Arlene Schnitzer Concert Hall, December 20, 1984	3:58
7.	"Outside Now (Original Solo)"	"City of Tiny Lites" - Rudi-Sedlmayer-Halle, March 31, 1979	5:29
8.	"Jim & Tammy's Upper Room"	"Advance Romance" - La Patinoire Municipale, June 1, 1982	3:11
9.	"Were We Ever Really Safe in San Antonio?"	"Drowning Witch" - Majestic Performing Arts Center, December 10, 1984	2:50
10.	"That Ol' G Minor Thing Again"	"City of Tiny Lites" - Hallenstadion, June 24, 1982	4:39
Total length:			20:42

Side three
No.	Title	Track source	Length
11.	"Move It or Park It"	"Black Page" - Alte Oper, June 11, 1982	5:43
12.	"Sunrise Redeemer"	"Let's Move to Cleveland" - Sunrise Musical Theatre, November 30, 1984	3:53
13.	"But Who Was Fulcanelli?"	"Drowning Witch" - Sporthalle, May 21, 1982	2:58
14.	"For Duane"	"Whipping Post" - Atlanta Civic Center, November 25, 1984	3:25
15.	"GOA"	"Let's Move to Cleveland" - Bismarck Theater, November 23, 1984	4:46
Total length:			21:13

Side four
No.	Title	Track source	Length
16.	"Winos Do Not March"	"Sharleena" - Memphis, TN, USA, December 4, 1984	3:14
17.	"Systems of Edges"	"Inca Roads" - Rhein-Main-Halle, March 27, 1979	5:32
18.	"Things That Look Like Meat"	"City of Tiny Lites" - Terrace Ballroom, December 7, 1981	6:55
19.	"Watermelon in Easter Hay"	Jones Beach Theater, August 16, 1984	4:00
Total length:			20:16

=== Compact Disc ===
Disc one
No.	Title	Track source	Length
1.	"Sexual Harassment in the Workplace"		3:42
2.	"Which One Is It?"	"Black Page" - Olympiahalle, June 26, 1982	3:04
3.	"Republicans"		5:07
4.	"Do Not Pass Go"		3:36
5.	"Chalk Pie"	"Zoot Allures" - Terrace Ballroom, December 7, 1981	4:51
6.	"In-A-Gadda-Stravinsky"	"Let's Move to Cleveland" - Atlanta Civic Center, November 25, 1984	2:50
7.	"That's Not Really Reggae"		3:17
8.	"When No One Was No One"		4:48
9.	"Once Again, Without the Net"		3:43
10.	"Outside Now (Original Solo)"		5:28
11.	"Jim & Tammy's Upper Room"		3:11
12.	"Were We Ever Really Safe in San Antonio?"		2:49
13.	"That Ol' G Minor Thing Again"		5:02
14.	"Hotel Atlanta Incidentals"	"Hot-Plate Heaven at the Green Hotel" - Atlanta Civic Center, November 25, 1984	2:44
15.	"That's Not Really a Shuffle"	"King Kong" - Brøndbyhallen, May 11, 1982	4:23
16.	"Move It or Park It"		5:43
17.	"Sunrise Redeemer"		3:58

Disc two
No.	Title	Track source	Length
1.	"Variations on Sinister #3"	"Easy Meat" - Oscar Mayer Theater, August 11, 1984	5:15
2.	"Orrin Hatch on Skis"	"Ride My Face to Chicago" - Sunrise Musical Theatre, November 30, 1984	2:12
3.	"But Who Was Fulcanelli?"		2:48
4.	"For Duane"		3:24
5.	"GOA"		4:51
6.	"Winos Do Not March"		3:14
7.	"Swans? What Swans?"	"Pound for a Brown" - Fox Theatre, December 12, 1981	4:23
8.	"Too Ugly for Show Business"	"King Kong" - Berkeley Community Theatre, December 10, 1981	4:20
9.	"Systems of Edges"		5:32
10.	"Do Not Try This at Home"	"Black Page" - Parco Redecesio, July 7, 1982	3:46
11.	"Things That Look Like Meat"		6:57
12.	"Watermelon in Easter Hay"		4:02
13.	"Canadian Customs"	"Let's Move to Cleveland" - Queen Elizabeth Theatre, December 18, 1984	3:34
14.	"Is That All There Is?"	"Let's Move to Cleveland" - Philipshalle, May 22, 1982	4:09
15.	"It Ain't Necessarily the Saint James Infirmary" (Gershwin, Gershwin, Heyward, Primrose)	"Pound for a Brown" - Stadio Communale, July 8, 1982	5:15
Total length:			131:38

== Personnel ==
- Frank Zappa - guitar (all tracks)
- Ray White - guitar (all tracks except 10, 26)
- Ike Willis - guitar (tracks 3, 6, 7, 9, 12, 14, 17–19, 21–23, 29, 30)
- Steve Vai - guitar (tracks 1, 2, 4, 5, 8, 11, 13, 15, 16, 20, 24, 25, 27, 28, 31, 32)
- Denny Walley - guitar (tracks 10, 26)
- Warren Cuccurullo - guitar (tracks 10, 26)
- Tommy Mars - keyboards (tracks 1, 2, 4, 5, 8, 10, 11, 13, 15, 16, 20, 24–27, 31, 32)
- Bobby Martin - keyboards (all tracks except 10, 26)
- Peter Wolf - keyboards (tracks 10, 26)
- Allan Zavod - keyboards (tracks 3, 6, 7, 9, 12, 14, 17–19, 21–23, 29, 30)
- Scott Thunes - bass guitar (all tracks except 10, 26)
- Arthur Barrow - bass guitar (tracks 10, 26)
- Ed Mann - percussion (tracks 1, 2, 4, 5, 8, 10, 11, 13, 15, 16, 20, 24–28, 31, 32)
- Chad Wackerman - drums (all tracks except 10, 26)
- Vinnie Colaiuta - drums (tracks 10, 26)
