= Advance Romance =

Song by Frank Zappa/Captain Beefheart/The Mothers

from the album Bongo Fury
- Released: October 2, 1975
- Recorded: May 1975
- Genre: Progressive rock, blues rock, experimental rock
- Length: 11:17
- Label: DiscReet
- Songwriter(s): Frank Zappa
- Producer(s): Frank Zappa

"Advance Romance" is a Frank Zappa song originally from his live album with Captain Beefheart, Bongo Fury. Other versions of the song can be found on You Can't Do That on Stage Anymore, Vol. 3, You Can't Do That On Stage Anymore, Vol. 5, and Make a Jazz Noise Here. It is a humorous parody of typical love songs and is sung by Napoleon Murphy Brock with George Duke. The song was played from 1975 to 1976 and from 1982 to 1988 making the song one of Zappa's most performed. Almost all of Zappa's lineups after its release on Bongo Fury played this song in concert.

== Lyric ==
The song describes a low-life world of poverty, heavy drinking ("No more credit from the liquor store"), promiscuity / prostitution, and theft. It features a girl who is very good at pleasing the singer in bed, though she takes advantage of his lust for her and takes all of his money. It is implied that she is promiscuous: "The way she do me boy, she might do you too." She takes advantage of the singer's friends as well, such as the mentioned "Potato head Bobby" (which references the main character in another Zappa song, "San Ber'dino") and George Duke with the lyrics "Took George's watch like they always do. (It was a Timex too!)"

== Solos ==
In the Bongo Fury version, Denny Walley's slide guitar solo is followed by Beefheart's sinuous harmonica licks and a lengthy Zappa guitar solo. The simple structure of the song allowed a lot of improvisation, so a solo from almost any instrument would fit in well. One solo was named "Jim and Tammy's Upper Room" and was put on Zappa's 1988 instrumental album Guitar.

== Original personnel ==
- Frank Zappa – guitar, backing vocals
- Captain Beefheart – harmonica, backing vocals, madness
- Napoleon Murphy Brock – vocals, saxophone
- George Duke – keyboards, vocals
- Denny Walley – slide guitar
- Tom Fowler – bass
- Terry Bozzio – drums
- Bruce Fowler – trombone
