= You Can't Do That on Stage Anymore, Vol. 3 =

Live album by Frank Zappa
- Released: November 13, 1989
- Recorded: Various recordings from December 10, 1971 – December 23, 1984
- Genres: Hard rock; progressive rock; art rock; comedy rock; experimental rock
- Length: 135:03
- Label: Rykodisc
- Producer: Frank Zappa

Frank Zappa chronology
Broadway the Hard Way (1988)	You Can't Do That on Stage Anymore, Vol. 3 (1989)	The Best Band You Never Heard in Your Life (1991)

Professional ratings
Review scores
Source	Rating
Allmusic	3.5/5 stars

You Can't Do That on Stage Anymore, Vol. 3 is a double disc live album by Frank Zappa, spanning from December 10, 1971, to December 23, 1984. It was released in 1989 (see 1989 in music).

"Sharleena" had been previously issued as a flexi disc in Guitar Player magazine. All the songs on disc one are by the 1984 band (except for brief segments of "Drowning Witch" edited in from the 1982 tour). Disc two includes performances from various years including a section of "King Kong" taken from the December 10, 1971, Rainbow Theatre concert, performed shortly before Zappa was pushed off the stage by an audience member who was jealous of his girlfriend's infatuation with Zappa. Zappa suffered serious fractures, head trauma and injuries to his back, leg, and neck, as well as a crushed larynx, which ultimately caused his voice to drop a third after healing. Zappa's liner notes state that after he played his solo the attack happened "moments later," but in his autobiography he wrote (consistent with the memories of other band members) that the incident took place after the band had finished its encore, a cover of the Beatles song "I Want to Hold Your Hand". Zappa claimed the tape ran out before the incident occurred. However, a full recording of the Rainbow concert would be released in 2022 both as part of The Mothers 1971 boxset and a standalone 3 LP set.

The album contains performances of "Cocaine Decisions" and "Nig Biz" from a concert in Palermo, Italy on July 14, 1982. During "Cocaine Decisions", an audience riot began and police shot tear gas into the auditorium. A canister can be heard triggering near the stage, and between songs, Zappa and roadie Massimo Bassoli are heard attempting to calm the crowd down. Zappa was later reported stating, "We played for an hour and a half with tear-gas in our face and everything else, and when it was all over we went off stage and we were trapped inside this place."

== Track listing ==
All tracks are written by Frank Zappa, except where noted.

Disc one
No.	Title	Recording venue(s) and date(s)	Length
1.	"Sharleena"	Universal Amphitheater, December 23, 1984	8:54
2.	"Bamboozled by Love" (Frank Zappa, Trevor Rabin, Trevor Horn, Jon Anderson, Chris Squire; includes the guitar riff from "Owner of a Lonely Heart")	Bismarck Theatre, November 23, 1984	6:06
3.	"Lucille Has Messed My Mind Up"	Bismarck Theatre, November 23, 1984	2:52
4.	"Advance Romance"	Bismarck Theatre, November 23, 1984; Queen Elizabeth Theatre, December 18, 1984	6:58
5.	"Bobby Brown Goes Down"	Paramount Theatre, December 17, 1984	2:44
6.	"Keep It Greasey"	The Pier, August 26, 1984; Paramount Theatre, December 17, 1984	3:30
7.	"Honey, Don't You Want a Man Like Me?"	The Pier, August 25–26, 1984	4:16
8.	"In France"	Bismarck Theatre, November 23, 1984	3:01
9.	"Drowning Witch"	Stadio Comunale, July 3, 1982; Bayfront Center Arena, December 1, 1984; Bismarck Theatre, November 23, 1984; Paramount Theatre, December 17, 1984	9:22
10.	"Ride My Face to Chicago"	Bismarck Theatre, November 23, 1984	4:22
11.	"Carol, You Fool"	Bismarck Theatre, November 23, 1984	4:06
12.	"Chana in de Bushwop" (Frank Zappa, Diva Zappa)	Bismarck Theatre, November 23, 1984	4:52
13.	"Joe's Garage"	Bismarck Theatre, November 23, 1984	2:20
14.	"Why Does It Hurt When I Pee?"	Bismarck Theatre, November 23, 1984; Paramount Theatre, December 17, 1984	3:07

Disc two
No.	Title	Recording venue(s) and date(s)	Length
1.	"Dickie's Such an Asshole"	The Roxy Theatre, December 10, 1973	10:08
2.	"Hands with a Hammer" (Terry Bozzio)	Kosei Nenkin Kaikan, February 3, 1976	3:18
3.	"Zoot Allures"	Kosei Nenkin Kaikan, February 3, 1976; Les Arenes, May 30, 1982 (guitar solo)	6:09
4.	"Society Pages"	The Palladium, October 31, 1981	2:32
5.	"I'm a Beautiful Guy"	The Palladium, October 31, 1981	1:54
6.	"Beauty Knows No Pain"	The Palladium, October 31, 1981	2:55
7.	"Charlie's Enormous Mouth"	The Palladium, October 31, 1981	3:39
8.	"Cocaine Decisions"	Bismarck Theatre, November 23, 1984; Stadio Comunale, July 14, 1982	3:14
9.	"Nig Biz"	Stadio Comunale, July 14, 1982	4:58
10.	"King Kong"	Parc Des Expositions, June 22, 1982; Rainbow Theatre, December 10, 1971; Hammersmith Odeon, June 19, 1982; Palais des Sports, June 3, 1982	24:32
11.	"Cosmik Debris"	Paramount Theatre, December 17, 1984; Arlene Schnitzer Concert Hall, December 20, 1984; The Pier, August 25–26, 1984 (ending)	5:14

== Personnel ==
- Frank Zappa – arranger, editing, keyboards, lyricist, vocals, producer, main performer, liner notes, guitar, compilation
- Mark Volman – vocals
- Howard Kaylan – vocals
- Steve Vai – guitar
- Dweezil Zappa – guitar
- Ike Willis – rhythm guitar, vocals
- Ray White – rhythm guitar, vocals
- Allan Zavod – keyboards
- Andre Lewis – keyboards
- Don Preston – keyboards, electronics
- George Duke – keyboards, vocals
- Tommy Mars – keyboards, vocals
- Bobby Martin – keyboards, vocals, saxophone
- Ian Underwood – alto saxophone, keyboards
- Jim Pons – bass guitar, vocals
- Scott Thunes – bass guitar, vocals, synthesizer
- Tom Fowler – bass guitar
- Chester Thompson – drums
- Chad Wackerman – drums, vocals
- Aynsley Dunbar – drums
- Terry Bozzio – drums, speech
- Ralph Humphrey – drums
- Ruth Underwood – percussion, keyboards
- Ed Mann – percussion
- Napoleon Murphy Brock – saxophone, vocals
- Bruce Fowler – trombone
- Diva Zappa – lyricist
- Mark Pinske – chief engineer
- Kerry McNabb – engineer
- Bob Stone – engineer, remixing, supervisor
