= Ed Mann =

American drummer (1955–2024)

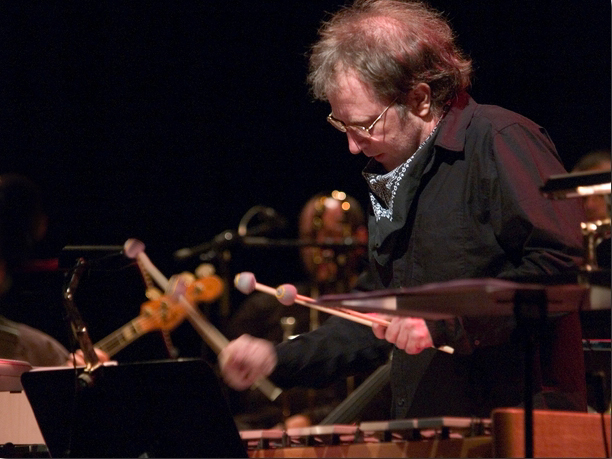
- Mann in 2007

Background information
- Born: Edward L. Mann; January 14, 1955; New Jersey, U.S.
- Died: May 31, 2024 (aged 69) Broomfield, Colorado, U.S.
- Occupations: Musician; composer; record producer
- Instruments: Mallet percussion; electronic keyboards
- Years active: 1975–2024

Edward L. Mann (January 14, 1955 – May 31, 2024) was an American musician best known for his mallet percussion performances onstage with Frank Zappa's ensemble from 1977 to 1988, and his appearances on over 30 of Zappa's albums, both studio recordings and with Zappa's band live. Mann also released a number of CDs as a bandleader and composer.

== Life and career ==
Mann described himself as "a drummer and piano dabbler since childhood." He formed a band with Tommy Mars in mid 1973; by the end of that year he was studying with John Bergamo at CalArts. In 1977, Frank Zappa asked Bergamo to do some overdubbing on the Zappa In New York album and Bergamo in turn recommended Mann.

A few months later Ruth Underwood told Mann that Zappa was looking for a second keyboard player. When Mann called to recommend Tommy Mars ("At midnight, the only time when you could reach Frank by phone"), Zappa invited him to come to his house. Mann went to the house, where Terry Bozzio, Patrick O'Hearn, and Adrian Belew were jamming with Zappa. By 2:00am Mann was in the band. He later commented: "It took a few days for that all to sink in."

Mann can be heard playing gongs on J21's Yellow Mind:Blue Mind album.

Until mid-2014, Mann was a member of The Band From Utopia which had featured many Zappa alumni such as Robert Martin, Chad Wackerman, Albert Wing, Tom Fowler, Ray White and Ralph Humphrey over the years. In 2008, he toured with Project Object and sat in with Agent Moosehead at the New York Harvest Festival and Freedom Rally. In 2013, Mann began performing on percussion and electronics with The Z3, an organ, guitar and drums trio that adapts Zappa music to the Hammond organ-centered jazz-funk tradition. Mann played on The White Album and gave a virtuoso performance on the song "Apple A Day". Mann played on two of David Arvedon's albums.

Mann joined Northeast blugrasstafarian jam band Desert Rain for their set at the Wormtown Music Festival in late 2015. From then on he joined the group at clubs throughout the northeastern United States.

In July 2016, Mann joined Mike Dillon for three dates of Dillon's northeast US tour.

Mann died on May 31, 2024, at the age of 69.

== Discography with Zappa ==
- Zappa in New York (Frank Zappa, 1978)
- Sheik Yerbouti (Frank Zappa, 1979)
- Joe's Garage Act I (Zappa, 1979)
- Joe's Garage Acts II & III (Zappa, 1979)
- Tinseltown Rebellion (Frank Zappa, 1981)
- Shut Up 'N Play Yer Guitar (Zappa, 1981)
- You Are What You Is (Zappa, 1981)
- Ship Arriving Too Late to Save a Drowning Witch (Zappa, 1982)
- The Man From Utopia (Zappa, 1983)
- Baby Snakes (Frank Zappa, 1983)
- London Symphony Orchestra, Vol. 1 (Zappa, 1983)
- Them or Us (Zappa, 1984)
- Thing-Fish (Zappa, 1984)
- Frank Zappa Meets the Mothers of Prevention (Frank Zappa, 1985)
- Jazz from Hell (Frank Zappa, 1986)
- London Symphony Orchestra, Vol. 2 (Zappa, 1987)
- Guitar (Frank Zappa, 1988)
- You Can't Do That on Stage Anymore, Vol. 1 (Zappa, 1988)
- Broadway the Hard Way (Frank Zappa)
- You Can't Do That on Stage Anymore, Vol. 3 (Zappa, 1989)
- The Best Band You Never Heard in Your Life (Frank Zappa, 1991)
- Make a Jazz Noise Here (Frank Zappa, 1991)
- You Can't Do That on Stage Anymore, Vol. 4 (Zappa, 1991)
- You Can't Do That on Stage Anymore, Vol. 5 (Zappa, 1992)
- You Can't Do That on Stage Anymore, Vol. 6 (Zappa, 1992)
- Frank Zappa Plays the Music of Frank Zappa: A Memorial Tribute (Frank Zappa, 1996)
- Halloween (Frank Zappa – Audio DVD, 2003)
- QuAUDIOPHILIAc (Zappa – kvadrofon Audio DVD, 2004)
- Trance-Fusion (Zappa Records 2006)
- The Dub Room Special (CD, Zappa Records, 2007)
- One Shot Deal (Zappa Records ZR 20006, 2008)
- Hammersmith Odeon (album) (Zappa, 2010)

Mann performances can be seen in the Zappa films Baby Snakes, Dub Room Special & Video From Hell.

== Solo discography ==
- Get Up (1988)
- Perfect World (1991)
- Global Warming (1994) with Brian Hand
- Have No Fear (1997)
- (((GONG))) Sound Of Being (1998)
