= Them or Us =

Studio album with live elements by Frank Zappa
- Released: October 18, 1984
- Recorded: November 1981 – June 1984 (elements of "Ya Hozna" and "Planet of My Dreams" were recorded between 1967 and 1976)
- Genres: Hard rock; progressive rock; comedy rock; doo-wop
- Length: 73:00
- Label: Barking Pumpkin
- Producer: Frank Zappa

Frank Zappa chronology
The Perfect Stranger (1984)	Them or Us (1984)	Thing-Fish (1984)

Singles from Them or Us
- 1. "Baby Take Your Teeth Out" Released: 1984; 2. "In France" Released: 1984

Professional ratings
Review scores
Source	Rating
AllMusic	3/5 stars

Them or Us is an album by American musician Frank Zappa, released in October 1984 by Barking Pumpkin Records.

"Now, the name of this album is Them or Us, and in America, as far as I'm concerned, it means US, the Pagans, versus THEM, those hideous Christians. And if they want to have a law in Congress that says you can't put anything backwards on a record, well, and how about a record that's got it all backwards?"

— Frank Zappa talks about "Ya Hozna", interviewed by Andy Batten-Foster, BBC Radio 1, UK, September 1984.

== Album content ==
Its opening and closing songs were not written by Zappa: "The Closer You Are", was written by Earl Lewis and Morgan Robinson and originally released by the Channels; and "Whipping Post", originally performed by the Allman Brothers Band.

"Ya Hozna" includes backward vocals taken from "Sofa No. 2" (from One Size Fits All, 1975), "Lonely Little Girl" (from We're Only in It for the Money, 1968) and unreleased outtakes of "Valley Girl" (vocals by Moon Zappa). "Planet of My Dreams" (featuring Bob Harris on vocals) is a 1981 studio recording taken from the score of Zappa's unrealized 1972 stage musical Hunchentoot (other titles from this show appear on the first-CD edition of the Sleep Dirt reissue from 1991). "Be in My Video", described as the best song on the album, pokes fun at the cliches in music videos, particularly David Bowie's 1983 hit single "Let's Dance".

As with other Zappa rock albums of this era, many of the tracks are sourced from live recordings. Later studio overdubs were liberally applied, although there is no mention of this on the album notes.

== Release ==
Following problems with the album Thing-Fish, which MCA Records refused to distribute, Zappa made a deal with EMI Records, which would allow Them or Us and Thing-Fish to be distributed by Capitol Records in the United States. Zappa wrote a "warning" printed on the inner sleeves of these albums, as well as Frank Zappa Meets the Mothers of Prevention (1985), stating that the albums contained content "which a truly free society would neither fear nor suppress", and a "guarantee" which stated that the lyrics would not "cause eternal torment in the place where the guy with the horns and pointed stick conducts his business."

== Track listing ==
All tracks are written by Frank Zappa, except where noted.

Side one
No.	Title	Length
1.	"The Closer You Are" (Earl Lewis, Morgan "Bobby" Robinson)	2:55
2.	"In France"	3:30
3.	"Ya Hozna"	6:26
4.	"Sharleena"	4:33
Total length:		18:01

Side two
No.	Title	Length
5.	"Sinister Footwear II"	8:39
6.	"Truck Driver Divorce"	8:59
Total length:		18:14

Side three
No.	Title	Length
7.	"Stevie's Spanking"	5:23
8.	"Baby, Take Your Teeth Out"	1:54
9.	"Marque-son's Chicken"	7:33
10.	"Planet of My Dreams"	1:37
Total length:		17:05

Side four
No.	Title	Length
11.	"Be in My Video"	3:39
12.	"Them or Us"	5:23
13.	"Frogs with Dirty Little Lips" (Frank Zappa, Ahmet Zappa)	2:42
14.	"Whipping Post" (Gregg Allman)	7:32
Total length:		19:40

== Personnel ==
=== Musicians ===
- Frank Zappa – guitar, vocals
- Ray White – guitar, vocals
- Steve Vai – guitar
- Dweezil Zappa – guitar
- Tommy Mars – keyboards
- Bobby Martin – keyboards, saxophone, vocals, harmonica
- George Duke – piano, vocals
- Brad Cole – piano
- Scott Thunes – bass, Minimoog
- Arthur Barrow – bass
- Patrick O'Hearn – bass
- Ed Mann – percussion
- Chad Wackerman – drums
- Ike Willis – vocals
- Napoleon Murphy Brock – vocals
- Roy Estrada – vocals
- Johnny "Guitar" Watson – vocals
- Moon Zappa – vocals
- Bob Harris – vocals
- Thana Harris – vocals

=== Production staff ===
- Mark Pinske – chief engineer
- John Matousek – mastering
- Gabrielle Raumberger – artwork, graphic design
- Steve Schapiro – photography
- Bob Stone – engineer
- Donald Roller Wilson – cover art
