= Road Tapes, Venue 1 =

Road Tapes, Venue #1

Live album by Frank Zappa
- Released: October 31, 2012
- Recorded: August 25, 1968
- Venue: Kerrisdale Arena (Vancouver, BC, Canada)
- Genre: Jazz rock, experimental rock, psychedelic rock
- Length: 88:21
- Label: Vaulternative Records; Catalog Number: VR 20122

Frank Zappa chronology
Carnegie Hall (2011)	Road Tapes, Venue #1 (2012)	Understanding America (2012)

Road Tapes, Venue #1 is a double live album by Frank Zappa, released posthumously on October 31, 2012, by the Zappa Family Trust on Vaulternative Records. It was recorded on August 25, 1968 at the Kerrisdale Cyclone Taylor Arena in Vancouver, British Columbia. It is the seventh installment on the Vaulternative Records label that is dedicated to the posthumous release of complete Zappa concerts, following the releases of FZ:OZ (2002), Buffalo (2007), Wazoo (2007), Philly '76 (2009), Hammersmith Odeon (2010) and Carnegie Hall (2011).

== Track listing ==
All music is composed by Frank Zappa, except "Octandre" by Edgard Varèse.

Disc one
No.	Title	Length
1.	"The Importance of an Earnest Attempt (By Hand)"	3:44
2.	"Help, I'm a Rock/Transylvania Boogie"	9:30
3.	"Flopsmash Musics"	4:50
4.	"Hungry Freaks, Daddy"	3:59
5.	"The Orange County Lumber Truck"	20:57
6.	"The Rewards of a Career in Music"	3:29

Disc two
No.	Title	Length
1.	"Trouble Every Day"	5:08
2.	"Shortly: Suite exists of Holiday in Berlin Full Blown"	9:29
3.	"Pound for a Brown"	3:13
4.	"Sleeping in a Jar"	3:23
5.	"Oh, in the Sky"	2:42
6.	"Octandre"	7:40
7.	"King Kong"	10:17

== Personnel ==
=== The Band ===
- Frank Zappa – guitar, vocals
- Motorhead Sherwood – baritone sax, tambourine, harmonica
- Roy Estrada – bass, vocals
- Don Preston – keyboards
- Ian Underwood – keyboards, woodwinds
- Bunk Gardner – woodwinds, voice
- Art Tripp III – drums, percussion
- Jimmy Carl Black – drums, vocals

=== Production ===
- Frank Zappa – composer, arranger, conductor; manuscript
- Gail Zappa – CD producer; concept, art direction & text
- Joe Travers – vaultmeisterment
- Joseph Carter – artwork
- Keith Lawler – layout & space time continuum for Vaulternative Records
- Diva Zappa – photography
