= Thing-Fish =

Studio album by Frank Zappa
- Released: November 21, 1984
- Recorded: 1976, 1980–1983
- Genres: Comedy rock; hard rock; rock opera
- Length: 90:58
- Label: Barking Pumpkin
- Producer: Frank Zappa

Frank Zappa chronology
Them or Us (1984)	Thing-Fish (1984)	Francesco Zappa (1984)

Thing-Fish is an album by American musician Frank Zappa, originally released as a triple album box set on Barking Pumpkin Records in 1984. It was billed as a cast recording for a proposed musical of the same name, which was ultimately not produced by Zappa, but later performed partially in 2003, ten years after his death.

The album's storyline is inspired by Broadway theatre, AIDS, eugenics, conspiracy theories, feminism, homosexuality and African American culture. It involves an evil, racist prince/theater critic who creates a disease intended to eradicate African Americans and homosexuals. The disease is tested on prisoners who are turned into "Mammy Nuns" led by the story's narrator, Thing-Fish. The story within a story is a satire of a White Anglo-Saxon Protestant couple, Harry and Rhonda (actually played by Italian-Americans), who attend a play performed by the "Mammy Nuns", and find themselves confronted with their pasts: Harry presented as a homosexual boy, Rhonda presented as a sex doll brought to life.

The story was constructed during the recording sessions, which included producing new overdubs for recordings which previously appeared on Zappa's albums Zoot Allures (1976), Tinsel Town Rebellion, You Are What You Is (both 1981) and Ship Arriving Too Late to Save a Drowning Witch (1982). The release of the album was delayed when Barking Pumpkin Records' previous distributor, MCA, refused to distribute the album. It was instead released by Capitol Records in the United States, accompanied by a "Warning/Guarantee" written by Zappa himself. Thing-Fish was initially received poorly by critics, who criticized the use of previously recorded material, but has since been reappraised for its highly satirical content.

== Background ==
Before leaving for London to record with the London Symphony Orchestra, Frank Zappa was home during Christmas season in 1982, and kept busy by writing, producing treatments for three films and a Broadway musical called Thing-Fish. Between 1981 and 1982, Broadway theatre had shifted from conservative musicals to experimental plays that were viewed as either being pretentious or vulgar. Thing-Fish satirized statements made by theater critics at the time, as well as arguing against the "dumbing down" of American culture. Previously, Zappa unsuccessfully attempted to stage two musicals on Broadway, Hunchentoot, which formed the basis for the compact disc reissue of Sleep Dirt, and a musical adaptation of William S. Burroughs' The Naked Lunch. Thing-Fish also drew conceptual themes from AIDS, feminism, gay chic, conspiracy theories and issues of class, greed and race.

The script was developed using existing songs; many of the songs in the projected musical were previously recorded for other albums, including Zoot Allures, Tinseltown Rebellion, You Are What You Is and Ship Arriving Too Late To Save A Drowning Witch. New vocals were combined with previously released tracks and new Synclavier music. In addition to the new songs, the previously recorded songs include new overdubs moving this storyline forward. As the recording process continued, Zappa brought in revised scripts and improved the work by editing or changing aspects with which he was dissatisfied.

Zappa attempted to stage Thing-Fish as a Broadway musical. In promotion of the planned musical, a photo sequence based upon the "Briefcase Boogie" scene was shot for the pornographic magazine Hustler, accompanied by plot excerpts from the scene. The sequence was 28 pages long. While the album was released, Zappa was unable to raise the $5 million budget required to stage the production, and shelved the project. Subsequently, Thing-Fish dialogue appeared on the album Frank Zappa Meets the Mothers of Prevention, during the piece "Porn Wars". The album was adapted for a limited stage production that took place in England in 2003. Many elaborate details were changed due to the small scale of the production.

== Style and influences ==
=== Lyrics and story themes ===
"The simple thought behind Thing-Fish is that somebody manufactured a disease called AIDS and they tested it. They were developing it as a weapon and they tested it on convicts, the same way as they used to do experiments on black inmates, using syphilis. That's documented. They used to do these experiments with syphilis on black inmates in US prisons. That's fact. So we take it one step further and they're concocting the special disease which is genetically specific to get rid of 'all highly rhythmic individuals and sissy boys.' So I postulate that they do this test in a prison and part of the test backfires and these mutants are created."
- Frank Zappa

The Thing-Fish characterization was performed by Ike Willis, who helped shape the dialogue himself using African American Vernacular English. According to Willis, "in my family, we sort of joke around with dialects, and what it sounded like to me was [the poet] Paul Laurence Dunbar. [...] I asked Frank if he had ever heard of this guy, and he said, 'No,' so I started giving him examples of Dunbar's work, and eventually, that ended up being a big influence on the Thing-Fish dialect."

Minstrel shows served as a source of satire within the storyline. The Thing-Fish characterization is also seen as satirizing Amos 'n' Andy, a successful radio series and controversial television series which drew protests from the NAACP, who regarded the dialect spoken by the main characters and supporting character Kingfish as being portrayed as being "too dumb to speak English." Additionally, Zappa satirized the Mammy archetype; the AIDS-like disease in the storyline turns prisoners into "Mammy Nuns" which are round and dress like Aunt Jemima. The Mammy archetype derives from the fictional character Mammy, as portrayed by Hattie McDaniel in the film Gone With The Wind.

Thing-Fish is delivered as a story within a story, concerning a spoiled White Anglo-Saxon Protestant couple, Harry and Rhonda, who attend a play that, at the beginning, is about and stars the Mammy Nuns. The story follows these characters through a series of ideological fads. It is revealed that Harry had become a homosexual as a result of the women's liberation movement, which caused him to lose all sexual desire for women; the younger versions of the characters are portrayed in the characters "Harry-As-A-Boy" and "Artificial Rhonda", with the young Rhonda being portrayed as a rubber sex doll, while her older counterpart becomes increasingly fascistic and feminist towards the end of the story.

=== Music and performance ===
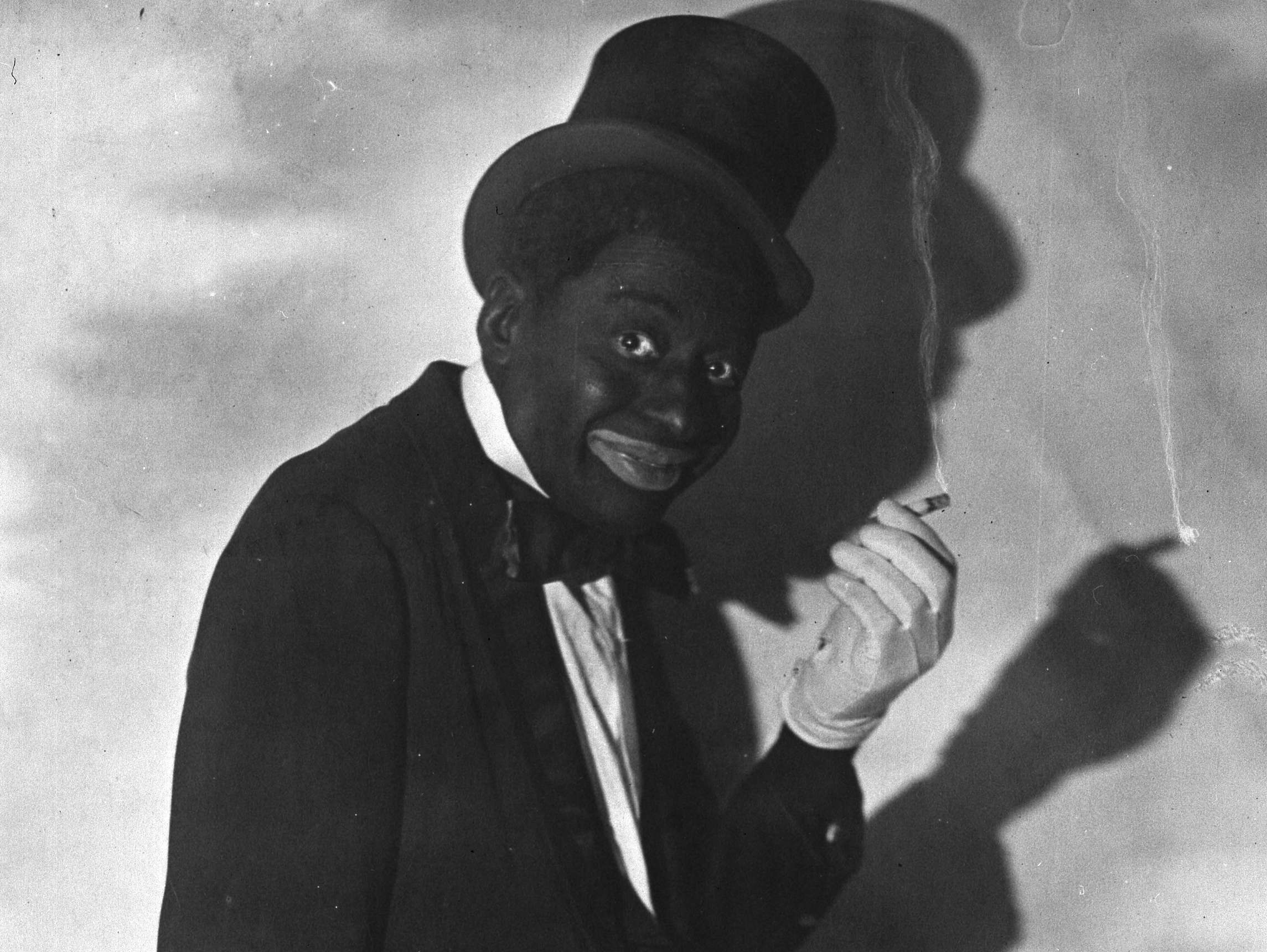
The concept of Thing-Fish satirized minstrel shows. "Mammy Nuns" resemble blackface performers.

The prologue is delivered as a spoken monologue over an instrumental piece with a heavy rock guitar riff. It is followed by the song "The Mammy Nuns", which originated as a hard rock instrumental, which appears in a live recording as "The Mammy Anthem" on You Can't Do That on Stage Anymore, Vol. 1, and opened performances in June and July 1982. "Galoot Up-Date" is an altered version of the recording "The Blue Light", which appeared on Zappa's album Tinseltown Rebellion. As Harry and Rhonda express admiration for the "performance" of the Evil Prince, an early version of Zappa's Synclavier composition "Amnerika" is heard. "Clowns on Velvet" was performed live as a "spirited, playful instrumental". A recording of the instrumental version featuring guitarist Al Di Meola was planned for release on the album Tinseltown Rebellion, but Di Meola refused its release.

Johnny "Guitar" Watson, appearing as the character Brown Moses, delivered running commentary in the song "He's So Gay", and sang the song "Brown Moses", which was influenced by soul and gospel music. The play's first act is concluded with "Artificial Rhonda", a rewrite of the song "Ms. Pinky", which appeared on Zoot Allures.

The next track begins with early Synclavier music by Zappa, and the computerized voice of "The Crab-Grass Baby". A portion of the "Baby's" monologue is taken directly from monologue Zappa recorded of Motorhead Sherwood's that was previously featured on Zappa's Lumpy Gravy LP. The next song features the Mammy Nuns singing "The White Boy Troubles". The Evil Prince, defeated at his own hands, delivers a soliloquy in the form of a Broadway piano ballad, "Wistful Wit a Fist-Full".

== Release ==
The Thing-Fish album was identified as an "original cast recording". Barking Pumpkin Records prepared to release the album with distribution by MCA Records. MCA produced a test pressing of the triple LP set, but withdrew their distribution after a woman in their quality control department became offended and upset by the album's content.

A deal was quickly made with EMI Records, which would allow Them Or Us and Thing-Fish to be distributed by Capitol Records in the United States. Zappa wrote a "warning" which appeared on the inner sleeves of these albums, as well as Frank Zappa Meets the Mothers of Prevention, which stated that the albums contained content "which a truly free society would neither fear nor suppress", and a "guarantee" which stated that the lyrics would not "cause eternal torment in the place where the guy with the horns and pointed stick conducts his business."

The original vinyl mix of Thing-Fish was only briefly available on CD via a 1987 EMI release in the United Kingdom. All other CD releases contain modifications, edits, re-equalization, and some minor remixing (the most significant difference—Johnny "Guitar" Watson's commentary during "He's So Gay"—was not implemented immediately). This new version was initially released on CD by Rykodisc, and along with most of Zappa's catalogue was reissued in 1995, also by Rykodisc.

In 2012, after the Zappa Family Trust had regained the rights to Zappa's catalogue, Zappa Records, along with Universal Music reissued the album (still in revised form) on CD.

== Critical reception ==
Professional ratings
Review scores
Source	Rating
AllMusic	3/5 stars

Thing-Fish was poorly received by critics upon initial release; a common thread of criticism was that many of the songs on this album derived from previously released recordings, and some detractors considered it to be nothing more than a compilation album. Barry Miles found it to be one of his "least substantive" works.

More recently the album has been reappraised, described by Kevin Courrier in Dangerous Kitchen: The Subversive World of Zappa as "a compendium of Zappa's most explicit attacks on political and sexual hypocrisy in American culture collected together in one huge volley." In Frank Zappa and musical theatre: ugly ugly o'phan Annie and really deep, intense, thought-provoking Broadway symbolism, Thing-Fish is described as "an extraordinary example of bricolage". As reviewed by François Couture for the website AllMusic, Couture described Thing-Fish as Zappa's "most controversial, misunderstood, overlooked album", stating that it was not a masterpiece, but "more than rehashed material".

== Track listing ==
Side one
No.	Title	Length
1.	"Prologue"	2:56
2.	"The Mammy Nuns"	3:50
3.	"Harry & Rhonda"	3:36
4.	"Galoot Up-Date"	5:29
Total length:		15:51

Side two
No.	Title	Length
1.	"The 'Torchum' Never Stops"	10:32
2.	"That Evil Prince"	1:17
3.	"You Are What You Is"	4:31
Total length:		16:20

Side three
No.	Title	Length
1.	"Mudd Club"	3:17
2.	"The Meek Shall Inherit Nothing"	3:14
3.	"Clowns on Velvet"	1:38
4.	"Harry-As-a-Boy"	2:51
5.	"He's So Gay"	2:48
Total length:		13:48

Side four
No.	Title	Length
1.	"The Massive Improve'lence"	5:07
2.	"Artificial Rhonda"	3:30
3.	"The Crab-Grass Baby"	3:48
4.	"The White Boy Troubles"	3:35
Total length:		16:00

Side five
No.	Title	Length
1.	"No Not Now"	5:50
2.	"Briefcase Boogie"	4:10
3.	"Brown Moses"	3:02
Total length:		13:02

Side six
No.	Title	Length
1.	"Wistful Wit a Fist-Full"	3:53
2.	"Drop Dead"	7:56
3.	"Won Ton On"	4:20
Total length:		16:09

- The 1995 CD release has sides one to three and side four tracks 1 & 2 on CD 1, and side four tracks 3 & 4 and sides five and six on CD 2.

== Personnel ==
Cast

- Ike Willis – Thing-Fish
- Terry Bozzio – Harry
- Dale Bozzio – Rhonda
- Napoleon Murphy Brock – The Evil Prince
- Bob Harris – Harry-As-A-Boy
- Johnny "Guitar" Watson – Brown Moses
- Ray White – Owl-Gonkwin-Jane Cowhoon

Credits

- Frank Zappa – Book & lyrics, music, arrangements, direction of characterizations and album production
- Mark Pinske & Bob Stone – Recording engineers
- Jene Omens – Thing-Fish & Sister Ob'dewlla 'X' prosthetics
- Robert Fletcher – Costumes
- Ladi Von Jansky – Cover photo

The musicians

- Frank Zappa – guitar, Synclavier
- Steve Vai – guitar
- Ray White – guitar
- Tommy Mars – keyboards
- Chuck Wild – broadway piano
- Arthur Barrow – bass
- Scott Thunes – bass
- Jay Anderson – string bass
- Ed Mann – percussion
- Chad Wackerman – drums
- Steve De Furia – Synclavier programmer
- David Ocker – Synclavier programmer

Uncredited musicians

- Bob Harris – keyboards and trumpet on "Galoot Up-Date", backing vocals on "No Not Now" and "Won Ton On"
- Motorhead Sherwood – saxophone on "Mudd Club"
- Denny Walley – slide guitar on "The Meek Shall Inherit Nothing"
- Bobby Martin – saxophone and keyboards on "Clowns on Velvet"
- Roy Estrada – backing vocals on "Artificial Rhonda", "No Not Now" and "Won Ton On"
- Captain Beefheart – harmonica on "Artificial Rhonda"
- Ruth Underwood – synthesizer on "Artificial Rhonda"
