= Ike Willis =

American vocalist and guitarist (1955–2026)

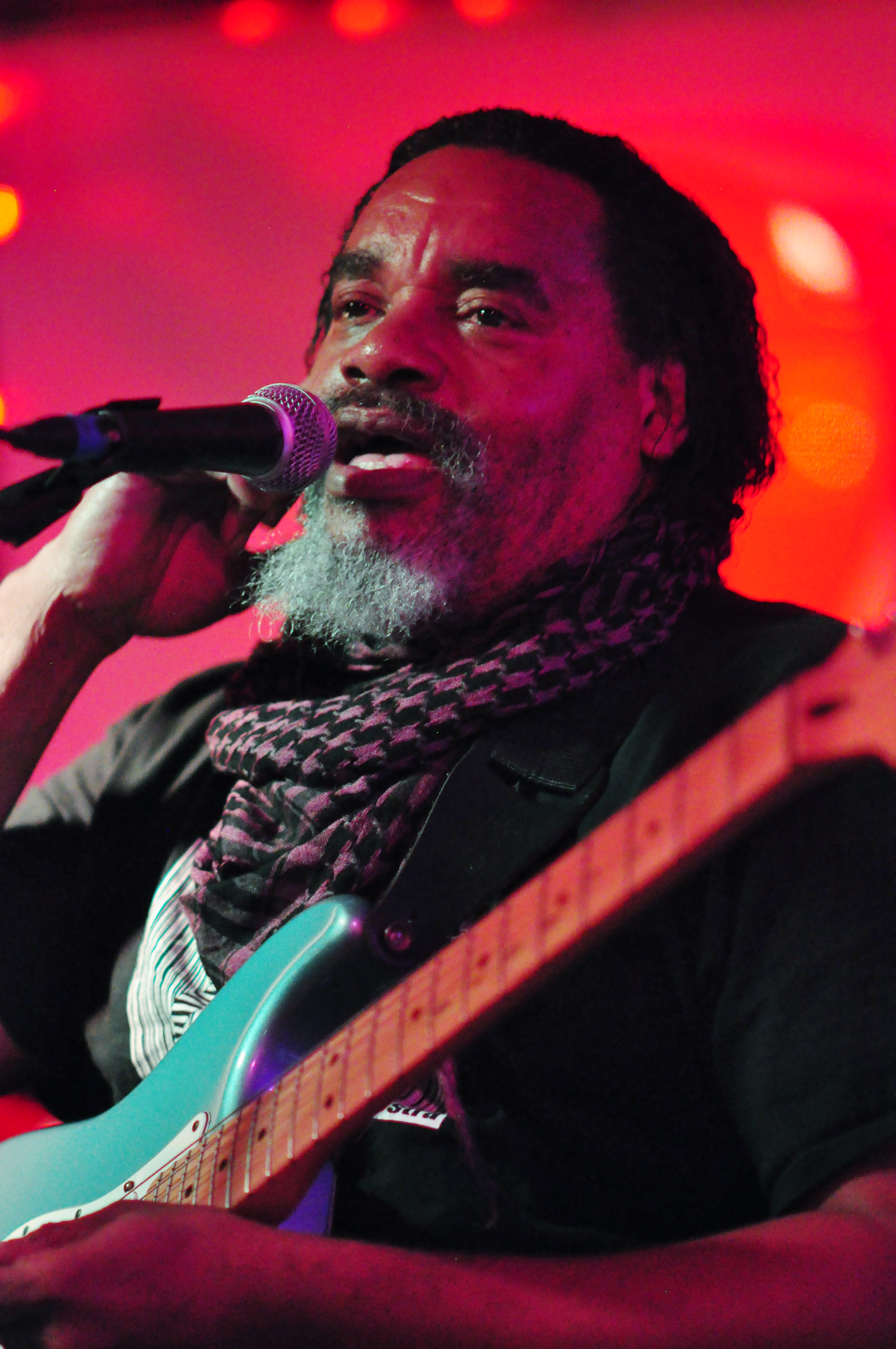
- Willis performing in 2015

Background information
- Also known as: Stucco Homes
- Born: Isaac Willis; November 12, 1955; St. Louis, Missouri, U.S.
- Died: May 16, 2026 (aged 70) North Las Vegas, Nevada, U.S.
- Genres: Progressive rock; classic rock; alternative rock; R&B
- Occupation: Musician
- Instruments: Vocals; guitar
- Years active: 1978–2026
- Labels: Zappa; Barking Pumpkin; Reprise; Enigma
- Website: ikewillis.com

Isaac Willis (November 12, 1955 – May 16, 2026) was an American vocalist and guitarist best known for being a regular member of Frank Zappa's studio and touring bands from 1978 until the last tour in 1988. He is most recognized for his involvement in Zappa records by playing Joe in Joe's Garage, providing vocals on Tinsel Town Rebellion, You Are What You Is, and The Man from Utopia, and as the title character and narrator in Zappa's off-Broadway-styled conceptual musical Thing-Fish, as well as singing and playing on the majority of Zappa's band-oriented studio and live recordings during the 1980s.

Willis regularly did studio voice work and wrote compositions for films. He also created solo music and led The Ike Willis Band. He released two solo studio albums under his own name and was working on another album prior to his death.

== Years with Frank Zappa ==
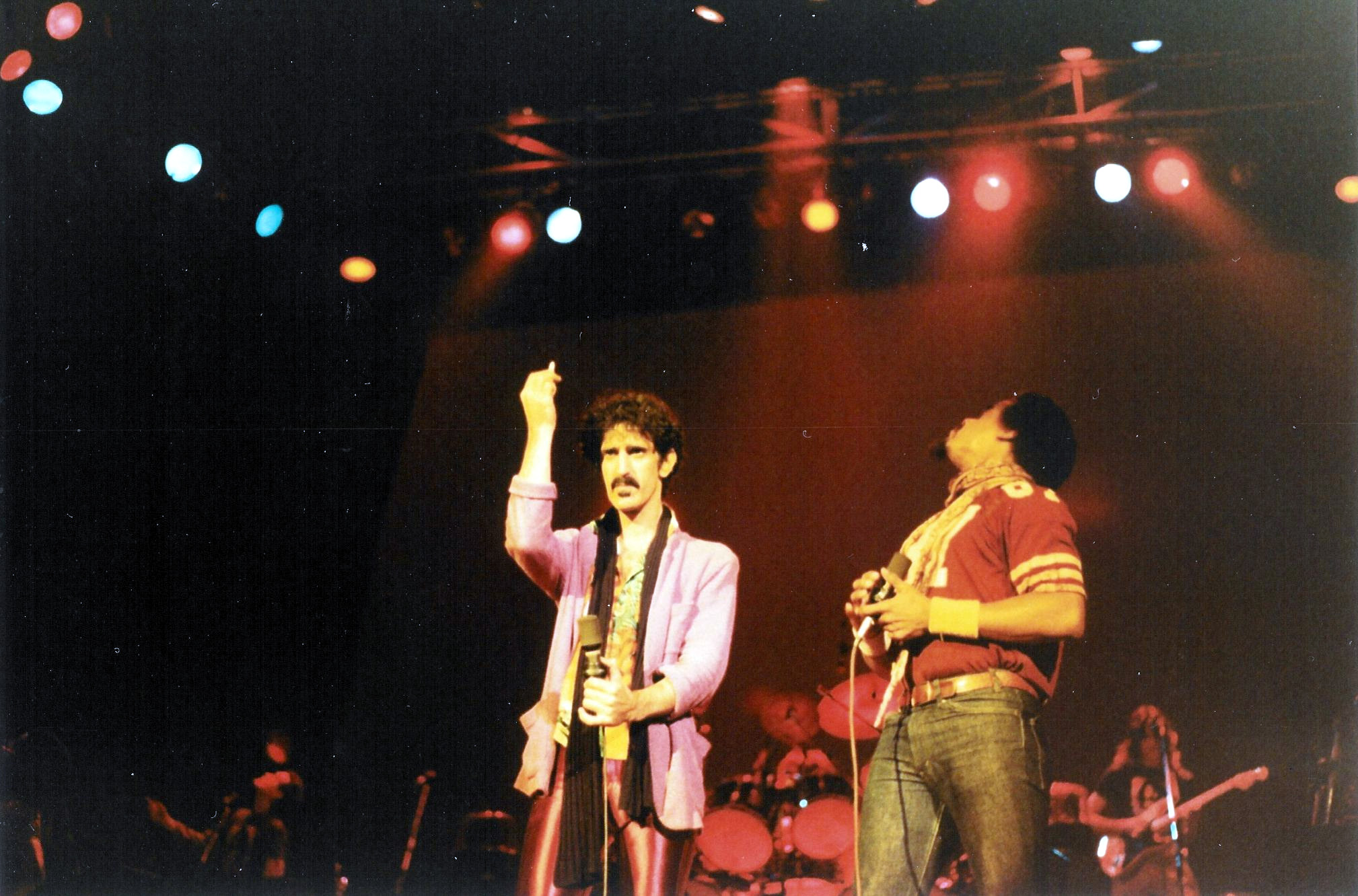
Willis and Zappa in 1980

A native of St Louis, Willis began playing guitar at the age of eight. As a teenager, he was part of a group of people mostly focussed on progressive rock and jazz fusion - "we were into Yes, Zappa, Mahavishnu Orchestra, Return to Forever... I was listening to... Genesis... The Beatles, you name it. So we’d all just sit up there smoking doobies and listen to our favourite stuff. [My friend and bandmate] Jeff [Hollie] brought me up to speed on all the latest Zappa stuff." "Black Napkins," a track from the 1976 Zappa album Zoot Allures, was one of the first Zappa songs to make a deep impression on Willis, although the latter had become a fan in 1974 after attending a Roxy And Elsewhere tour concert (he would later confess "from that point on, Nappy (Napoleon Murphy Brock) influenced everything that I did. As far as vocals and as a performer and being a frontman was concerned, especially with Zappa stuff. I learned a lot while watching him."

In 1977, Willis was studying political science at Washington University and simultaneously working on the concert committee and in-house technical crew. These activities won Willis a backstage pass, which he used to meet Zappa when the latter played a concert at the university. The two struck up conversation, after which Zappa "[took] me to his dressing room, hands me his guitar and says, 'Do you know any of my shit?' And I said, 'yeah', and he said, 'Well, play me something.'" Having done so, and jammed with the rest of the band backstage, Willis promptly volunteered his services as a singer, while Zappa also invited him to audition as a guitarist. Following his university graduation, he made a successful formal audition in California later in the year and "never left".

From 1978 onwards, Willis became a mainstay of the Zappa bands and studio work line-ups, surviving various purges and reshufflings for an entire decade. He claimed, "my job in Frank's band [was] to remember everything" and that "when Frank says be there, I'm there." Looking back in 2022, nearly thirty years after Zappa's death, he would observe "I'm very loyal to Frank. OK? If there is one thing you will notice about Ike Willis, and it's why I was with Frank longer than anybody else, it's that Ike Willis follows directions. The main reason that Frank kept me around for so long is that I did what he told me to do. That is how it has always worked for me.... I understood every time I listened to Frank, anything political or anything considered political: I knew exactly what he was talking about, politically... It was a privilege for me to be able to perform and to be a part of this person's orbit. I have always thought that Frank was the most intelligent human being I have ever met."

His first appearance on a Zappa record was on the 1979 triple album Joe's Garage, on which he featured as lead singer on many tracks, providing the voice of the character "Joe" in a rock opera about the danger of repressive political systems, and the suppression of freedom of speech and music (inspired in part by the Iranian Revolution that had made music illegal within its jurisdiction at the time) and about the "strange relationship Americans have with sex and sexual frankness". In addition to singing on Tinsel Town Rebellion, You Are What You Is, and The Man from Utopia, he also played the title character and narrator in Zappa's off-Broadway-styled conceptual musical Thing-Fish. Although Willis did not tour with Zappa in 1981 and 1982 (because he wanted to be at home for the birth of his two children), he returned for the final two Zappa tours in 1984 (which Zappa had intended at the time to be his final tour) and 1988.

Willis deeply regretted that Zappa died before he was able to include him in a band that would also have toured in 1996, the 25th anniversary of the release of Zappa's surrealistic musical pseudo-documentary 200 Motels. The band was also to have included Flo & Eddie and George Duke.

== After Zappa ==
Willis remained associated with Frank Zappa even when no longer playing on the latter's records and tours. He claimed to have been the last of Zappa's former band members to have seen Zappa alive, the week before the impresario's death, and that Zappa had told him to keep his music alive. Willis recalled "Frank told me before he passed away to play it like you learned it. Just like he taught me. It's got to be the way it was written and performed. Those were my only instructions from Frank. He said, 'don't change anything; don't ad-lib, don't try to get cute, don't try to spruce it up, don’t change the key that it was written in. Play the songs like I taught you.'"

Later in life, Willis toured with the Frank Zappa tribute bands The Muffin Men, Banned from Utopia, Bogus Pomp, Ossi Duri, Project/Object, Pojama People, Ugly Radio Rebellion, The Stinkfoot Orchestra, ZAPPATiKA, and with the Italian bands Ossi Duri and Elio e le Storie Tese. Additionally, he appeared multiple times at the annual Zappanale Festival in Bad Doberan, Germany.

== Illness and death ==
In 2021, Willis revealed that he had been diagnosed with prostate cancer, which had spread to other parts of his body.

Willis died in North Las Vegas on May 16, 2026, at the age of 70.

== Discography ==
=== With Frank Zappa ===
Year	Album	Label
1979	Joe's Garage Act I	Zappa Records
1979	Joe's Garage Acts II & III	ZR
1981	Tinseltown Rebellion	Barking Pumpkin Records
1981	Shut Up 'n Play Yer Guitar	BPR
1981	Shut Up 'n Play Yer Guitar Some More	BPR
1981	Return of the Son of Shut Up 'n Play Yer Guitar	BPR
1981	You Are What You Is	BPR
1982	Ship Arriving Too Late to Save a Drowning Witch	BPR
1983	The Man from Utopia	BPR
1984	Them or Us	BPR
1984	Thing-Fish	BPR
1985	Frank Zappa Meets the Mothers of Prevention	BPR
1986	Does Humor Belong in Music?	EMI
1988	Guitar	BPR
1988	You Can't Do That on Stage Anymore, Vol. 1	Rykodisc
1988	Broadway the Hard Way	BPR
1989	You Can't Do That on Stage Anymore, Vol. 3	Rykodisc
1991	The Best Band You Never Heard in Your Life	BPR
1991	Make a Jazz Noise Here	BPR
1991	You Can't Do That on Stage Anymore, Vol. 4	Rykodisc
1992	You Can't Do That on Stage Anymore, Vol. 6 1979-1988 "Dirty Love", "Magic Fingers", "The Madison Panty-Sniffing Festival", "Honey, Don't You Want A Man Like Me?", "I'm So Cute", "Ms. Pinky", "Make A Sex Noise", "Tracy Is A Snob", "Emperor Of Ohio", "Dinah-Moe Humm", "He's So Gay", "Camarillo Brillo", "Muffin Man", "The Illinois Enema Bandit", "We're Turning Again", "Catholic Girls", "Crew Slut", "Lisa's Life Story", "Lonesome Cowboy Nando"	Rykodisc

=== w/ Frank Zappa (posthumous) ===
- 1996 – The Lost Episodes ("I Don't Wanna Get Drafted")
- 1997 – Have I Offended Someone? 1973-1985 compilation
- 2006 – Trance-Fusion ("Good Lobna", "Butter Or Cannons", "Diplodocus", "For Giuseppe Franco", "Light Is All That Matters") Aug-Dec 1984
- 2007 – Buffalo (complete 10/25/1980 concert)
- 2008 – One Shot Deal ("Occam's Razor" 3/21/1979)
- 2012 – Understanding America compilation
- 2016 – Frank Zappa for President 1966-1993 compilation, vinyl releases 2024 ("When the Lie's So Big" & "America the Beautiful") 1988
- 2016 – Chicago '78 (complete 9/29/1978 late show)
- 2021 – Zappa '88 The Last U.S. Show (almost complete 3/25/1988 show+) 2CD/4LP
- 2023 – Zappa '80 Mudd Club/Munich (complete shows 5/8/1980 & 7/3/1980) 3CD/2-3LP

=== Other artists ===
Year	Album	Label
1990	Terry Robb with Ike Willis, Jelly Behind the Sun	House Records, H1003
1994/1995	The Muffin Men with Ike Willis "Mülm" (US & EU version)	Muffin Records Productions
1996	The Muffin Men with Ike Willis "Feel the Food"	Muffin Records Productions
2023	Dr Mumbai featuring Ike Willis, Hangar 63	Indi Release

=== Ike Willis Band ===
Year	Album	Label
1987	Should'a Gone Before I Left (Vinyl)	Enigma
1994	Should'a Gone Before I Left (CD)	Muffin Records Productions
1998	"Dirty Pictures" (CD)	Muffin Records Productions

== See also ==
- LaClede Town
