= You Can't Do That on Stage Anymore =

You Can't Do That on Stage Anymore is the collective title of several live albums by Frank Zappa, comprising:

- You Can't Do That on Stage Anymore, Vol. 1
- You Can't Do That on Stage Anymore, Vol. 2
- You Can't Do That on Stage Anymore, Vol. 3
- You Can't Do That on Stage Anymore, Vol. 4
- You Can't Do That on Stage Anymore, Vol. 5
- You Can't Do That on Stage Anymore, Vol. 6
