= Broadway the Hard Way =

Live album by Frank Zappa
- Released: October 14, 1988
- Recorded: February 9 – June 9, 1988
- Genre: Art rock; jazz fusion
- Length: 40:35 (LP); 71:03 (CD)
- Label: Barking Pumpkin
- Producer: Frank Zappa

Frank Zappa chronology
You Can't Do That on Stage Anymore, Vol. 2 (1988)	Broadway the Hard Way (1988)	You Can't Do That on Stage Anymore, Vol. 3 (1989)

Professional ratings
Review scores
Source	Rating
AllMusic	4/5 stars

Broadway the Hard Way is a live album by American musician Frank Zappa recorded at various performances along his 1988 world tour. It was first released as a 9-track vinyl album through Zappa's label Barking Pumpkin Records in October 1988, and subsequently as a 17-track CD through Rykodisc in 1989.

== Music and lyrics ==
This album was compiled from Zappa's last tour in 1988. Most of the songs are satirical of prominent contemporary figures, chiefly in the political sphere, and of current social and political trends. Zappa's individual targets include Richard Nixon and Ronald Reagan on "Dickie's Such an Asshole" (written in 1973), Jesse Jackson on "Rhymin' Man", Jim and Tammy Faye Bakker and Pat Robertson on "Jesus Thinks You're a Jerk", and Michael Jackson and his family on "Why Don't You Like Me?". In "Any Kind of Pain" (which Zappa's band had performed as an instrumental in 1976 and rehearsed in 1981, with slightly different melody and lyrics, but was not completed as a vocal work until 1988), he satirises the manner in which an imagined vapid model is exploited and despised by the men who employ her.

The album contains several covers, from the jazz standard "Stolen Moments" to the Police song "Murder by Numbers" (with a guest appearance by Sting). "Outside Now" is from Joe's Garage, and "Why Don't You Like Me" can be easily recognized as a remake of Zappa's 1970 title "Tell Me You Love Me." "Rhymin' Man" is filled with melodic quotes from evergreens such as "Happy Days Are Here Again", "Hava Nagila", "La Cucaracha" and "Frère Jacques". In "What Kind of Girl" there is a line from the Beatles' "Strawberry Fields Forever" and a segment from the "Battle Hymn of the Republic"; while "Jesus Thinks You're a Jerk" quotes "Louie Louie", "Rock of Ages" and Marius Constant's Theme from The Twilight Zone.

"Promiscuous", which takes aim at surgeon general C. Everett Koop, is delivered in rapped verse.

Despite the title, Zappa did not intend the material for a theatrical production, but the album received a Grammy nomination in 1990 for Best Musical Cast Show Album, losing to Jerome Robbins' Broadway.

== Track listing ==
Original LP

All tracks are written by Frank Zappa, except where noted.

Side one
No.	Title	Venue and date(s)	Length
1.	"Elvis Has Just Left the Building"	Palasport di Genova, June 9, 1988	2:24
2.	"Planet of the Baritone Women"	Music Hall, March 5, 1988; Warner Theatre, February 9, 1988; Tower Theater, February 12, 1988	2:48
3.	"Any Kind of Pain"	Music Hall, March 5, 1988; Warner Theatre, February 9, 1988; Tower Theater, February 12, 1988; Falkoner Teatret, April 25, 1988	5:42
4.	"Jesus Thinks You're a Jerk"	Tower Theater, February 13 and 14, 1988; Royal Oak Music Theatre, February 26, 1988; Cumberland County Civic Center, March 15, 1988; Rothman Center, March 20, 1988; Civic Center, March 16, 1988; Nassau Coliseum, March 25, 1988; Warner Theatre, February 9, 1988; Wembley Arena, April 19, 1988; Shea's Theater, March 9, 1988; War Memorial Auditorium, March 11, 1988	9:15
Total length:			20:45

Side two
No.	Title	Venue and date(s)	Length
5.	"Dickie's Such an Asshole"	Music Hall, March 5, 1988; Warner Theatre, February 9, 1988; Hall Tivoli, May 23, 1988; Broome County Arena, March 17, 1988; Olympen, April 26, 1988	6:37
6.	"When the Lie's So Big"	Music Hall, March 5, 1988; Warner Theatre, February 9, 1988	3:38
7.	"Rhymin' Man"	Rudi-Sedlmayer-Halle, May 9, 1988	3:51
8.	"Promiscuous"	Royal Oak Music Theatre, February 26, 1988	2:03
9.	"The Untouchables" (Nelson Riddle)	Civic Center, March 16, 1988	3:05
Total length:			19:50

CD version
No.	Title	Venue and date(s)	Length
1.	"Elvis Has Just Left the Building"	Palasport di Genova, June 9, 1988	2:24
2.	"Planet of the Baritone Women"	Music Hall, March 5, 1988; Warner Theatre, February 9, 1988; Tower Theater, February 12, 1988	2:48
3.	"Any Kind of Pain"	Music Hall, March 5, 1988; Warner Theatre, February 9, 1988; Tower Theater, February 12, 1988; Falkoner Teatret, April 25, 1988	5:42
4.	"Dickie's Such an Asshole"	Music Hall, March 5, 1988; Warner Theatre, February 9, 1988; Hall Tivoli, May 23, 1988; Broome County Arena, March 17, 1988; Olympen, April 26, 1988	5:45
5.	"When the Lie's So Big"	Music Hall, March 5, 1988; Warner Theatre, February 9, 1988	3:38
6.	"Rhymin' Man"	Rudi-Sedlmayer-Halle, May 9, 1988	3:50
7.	"Promiscuous"	Royal Oak Music Theatre, February 26, 1988	2:02
8.	"The Untouchables" (Riddle)	Civic Center, March 16, 1988	2:26
9.	"Why Don't You Like Me?"	Bushnell Memorial Hall, February 17, 1988; Syria Mosque, February 25, 1988; Tower Theater, February 13, 1988; Auditorium Theatre, March 3, 1988	2:57
10.	"Bacon Fat" (Andre Williams, Dorothy Brown, Zappa)	Frauenthal Auditorium, March 1, 1988	1:29
11.	"Stolen Moments" (Oliver Nelson)	Frauenthal Auditorium, March 1, 1988; Auditorium Theatre, March 3, 1988	2:57
12.	"Murder by Numbers" (Sting, Andy Summers)	Auditorium Theatre, March 3, 1988	5:37
13.	"Jezebel Boy"	Tower Theater, February 13, 1988	2:27
14.	"Outside Now"	Wembley Arena, April 19, 1988; Palasport di Genova, June 9, 1988	7:49
15.	"Hot Plate Heaven at the Green Hotel"	Wiener Stadthalle, May 8, 1988; Rudi-Sedlmayer-Halle, May 9, 1988	6:40
16.	"What Kind of Girl?"	Frauenthal Auditorium, March 1, 1988; Auditorium Theatre, March 4, 1988	3:17
17.	"Jesus Thinks You're a Jerk"	Tower Theater, February 13 & 14 1988; Royal Oak Music Theatre, February 26, 1988; Cumberland County Civic Center, March 15, 1988; Rothman Center, March 20, 1988; Civic Center, March 16, 1988; Nassau Coliseum, March 25, 1988; Warner Theatre, February 9, 1988; Wembley Arena, April 19, 1988; Shea's Theater, March 9, 1988; War Memorial Auditorium, March 11, 1988	9:15

== Personnel ==
- Frank Zappa – lead guitar, vocal
- Ike Willis – guitar, vocal
- Mike Keneally – guitar, synth, vocal
- Robert Martin – keyboards, vocal
- Ed Mann – percussion
- Walt Fowler – trumpet
- Bruce Fowler – trombone
- Paul Carman – alto saxophone
- Albert Wing – tenor saxophone
- Kurt McGettrick – baritone saxophone
- Scott Thunes – bass
- Chad Wackerman – drums
- Eric Buxton (an audience member) – spoken narrative during middle 8 on "Jesus Thinks You're A Jerk"
- Sting – lead vocal on "Murder by Numbers"
