= Who Needs the Peace Corps? =

Song by The Mothers of Invention

from the album We're Only in It for the Money
- Released: March 4, 1968
- Recorded: March 6, 1967; July–October 1967
- Genre: Psychedelic rock, satire, comedy rock, experimental rock
- Length: 2:34
- Label: Verve, Bizarre, Rykodisc
- Songwriter: Frank Zappa
- Producer: Frank Zappa

"Who Needs the Peace Corps?" is a rock and roll song written by American musician Frank Zappa and featured as the second track on the 1968 album We're Only in It for the Money by The Mothers of Invention.

The lyrics are a satire of the hippie and flower power movements of the era, narrated by an insincere young man who travels to San Francisco for the Summer of Love: "I will ask the Chamber Of Commerce how to get to Haight Street / And smoke an awful lot of dope".

The song quickly became dated when the hippie movement faded and was only performed live during the early years of the Mothers of Invention. It was briefly revived in 1988 however, as can be heard on the live album The Best Band You Never Heard in Your Life. On the performance selected for the album, Mike Keneally performs the monologue at the end of the song in a style reminiscent of Johnny Cash's, who was very unlike the hippie portrayed in the song.

The song is also part of the soundtrack of the 1969 film Medium Cool.

== Lyrics ==
The lyrics of "Who Needs the Peace Corps?" mock hippies and people who follow the hippie fashion (such as wearing beads, leather bands and long hair, or "smoking dope") without caring about the social reflections and political views of the concept. It includes a monologue of a stereotypical "phony hippie" who aspires to find a rock band and become their road manager in order to become part of the hippie movement.

In his 2016 book Rock, Counterculture and the Avant-Garde, 1966-1970, Doyle Greene says:

..."Peace Corps" is not necessarily referring to the U.S. government organization, but the "peace and love corps" of the hippie movement. It is a scathing critique of the counter-culture experience as migrating to San Francisco, dressing in hippie fashions, contracting sexually transmitted diseases, getting beat up by police, and high-tailing back home.
