= Olympen =

Music venue in Lund, Sweden

Olympen was a music venue located in Lund, Sweden. It had a capacity of 2,500 and hosted many famous artists from 1971 to 2009. A partial list of performers include Roxette, Iron Maiden, Alice Cooper, Steppenwolf, Queen, Faces, Paul McCartney and Wings, Kiss, ABBA, Neil Young, Black Sabbath, Bob Dylan, Depeche Mode, Frank Zappa, Santana, Metallica and Kraftwerk. The facility was remodeled into a gym in 2011.
