= Frank Zappa for President =

Compilation album by Frank Zappa
- Released: July 15, 2016
- Genre: Rock
- Length: 43:17
- Label: Zappa Records; Catalog Number: ZR 20021
- Producer: Ahmet Zappa, Joe Travers

Frank Zappa chronology
The Crux of the Biscuit (2016)	Frank Zappa for President (2016)	ZAPPAtite (2016)

Frank Zappa for President is a compilation album by American musician Frank Zappa, released in July 2016, consisting of unreleased compositions played on the Synclavier and unheard tracks relating to the uniting political thread that ties it all together. This compilation had a vinyl release in 2024, first for Record Store Day in April as a "Red, White & Blue splatter" with silk screened Side D (limited to 3,500), followed by a wider release through the Zappa store.

== Track listing ==
All tracks are written by Frank Zappa

No.	Title	Length
1.	"Overture To "Uncle Sam""	15:16
2.	"Brown Shoes Don't Make It (Remix)"	7:27
3.	"Amnerika (Vocal Version)"	3:10
4.	"If I Was President"	3:43
5.	"When The Lie's So Big"	3:38
6.	"Medieval Ensemble"	6:31
7.	"America The Beautiful"	3:27

== Personnel ==
- All titles performed/arranged/conducted by Frank Zappa
