= Scott Thunes =

American bass player (born 1960)

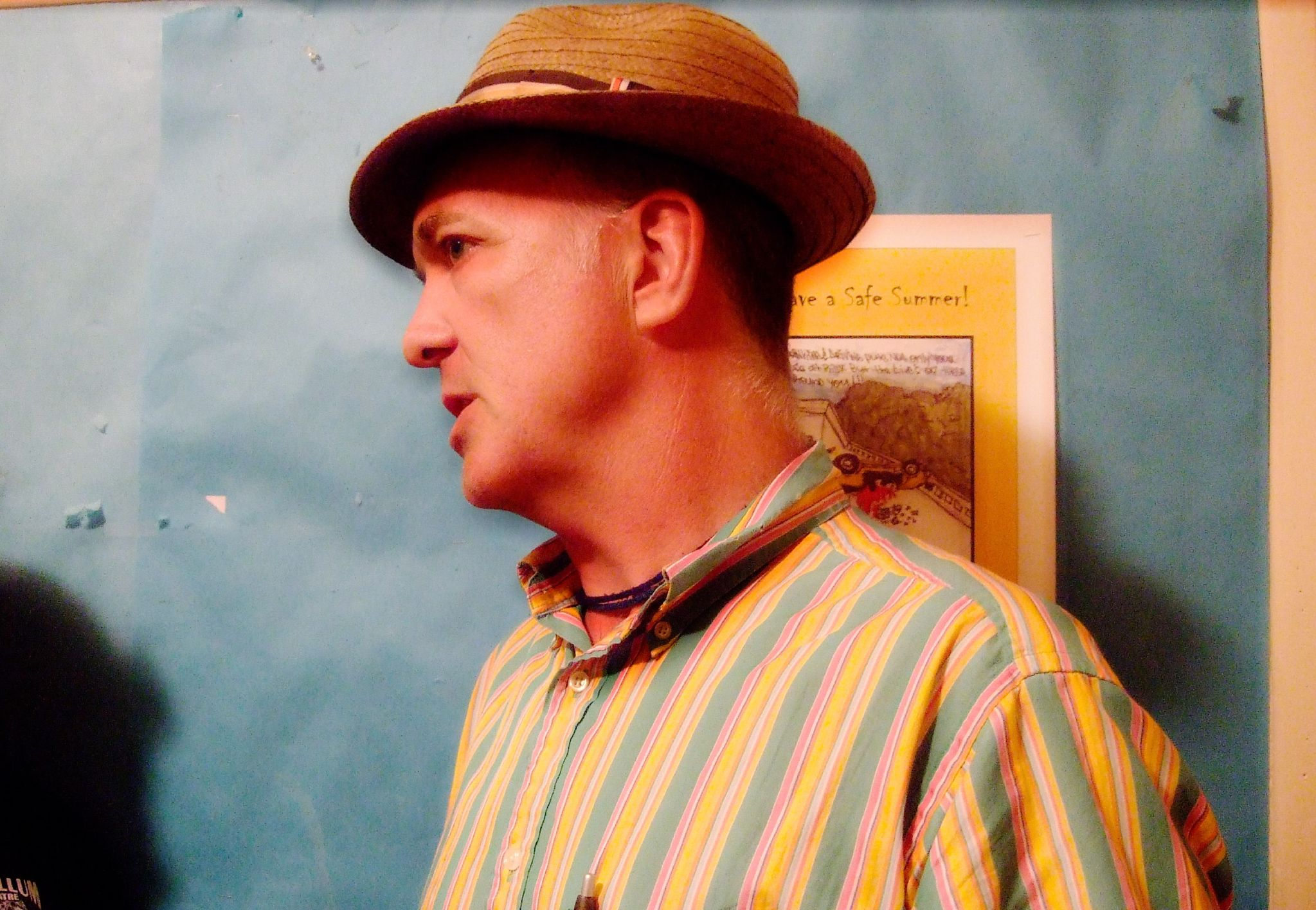

Background information
- Born: January 20, 1960 (age 66); Los Angeles, California, U.S.
- Occupation: Musician
- Instrument: Bass guitar
- Years active: 1981–present

Scott Thunes (/ˈtuːnɪs/ TOO-niss; born January 20, 1960) is a bass player, formerly with Frank Zappa, Wayne Kramer, Steve Vai, Andy Prieboy, Mike Keneally, Fear, The Waterboys, Big Bang Beat, and others.

== Early life ==
Thunes was raised in San Anselmo, California.

== Career ==
He played with Zappa's band from 1981 to 1988, joining at the age of 21, and plays on such albums as Ship Arriving Too Late to Save a Drowning Witch (1982), The Man from Utopia (1983), Them or Us (1984), Frank Zappa Meets the Mothers of Prevention (1985), Does Humor Belong In Music? (1986), Broadway the Hard Way (1988), You Can't Do That on Stage Anymore, The Best Band You Never Heard in Your Life, Make a Jazz Noise Here (both 1991), and Guitar (1988), a double-album compilation of Zappa's live guitar solos.

His most prominent bass performance can be heard on Frank Zappa's "Valley Girl", which peaked at No. 32 on the Billboard Hot 100.

He played bass on Frank Zappa's Jazz from Hell, which won a Grammy Award for Best Rock Instrumental Performance in 1988.

More recently, he is touring on bass as part of ongoing The Zappa Band tribute group, Banned from Utopia, made up of ex-Zappa band alumni Ray White (lead vocals, guitar), Mike Keneally (guitar, keys, vocals), Robert 'Bobby' Martin (keyboards, sax, vocals), and Zappa Plays Zappa alums Jamie Kime (guitar) and ZAPPA archivist Joe “Vaultmeister” Travers (drums, vocals). In 2021, The Zappa Band tribute group opened for King Crimson multiple times.

Thunes is a Teaching Artist, for the Rock Band program at Marin School of the Arts at Novato High School in Novato, California.
