= Trouble Every Day (song) =

Single by the Mothers of Invention

from the album Freak Out!
- A-side: "Who Are the Brain Police?"
- Released: 1966
- Recorded: March 9, 1966
- Genre: Blues rock; talking blues
- Length: 5:50
- Label: Verve
- Songwriter: Frank Zappa
- Producer: Tom Wilson

The Mothers of Invention singles chronology
"How Could I Be Such Fool?" (1966)	"Trouble Every Day" (1966)	"Big Leg Emma" (1967)

"Trouble Every Day" (labeled in early prints as "Trouble Comin' Every Day") is a song by the Mothers of Invention, released on their 1966 debut album Freak Out!

== Background and composition ==
Frank Zappa wrote the song in 1965 at 1819 Bellevue Avenue, Echo Park, Los Angeles, the residence of a methamphetamine chemist referred to by Zappa as "Wild Bill the Mannequin-Fucker" after watching news coverage of the Watts Riots. Originally dubbed "The Watts Riot Song", its primary lyrical themes are racial violence, social injustice, and sensationalist journalism. The musical style—featuring multiple guitar tracks and a harmonica—much more closely resembles blues than mainstream rock and roll.

Producer Tom Wilson of MGM Records signed the Mothers to a record deal on March 1, 1966, having heard only this song and believing them to be a "white blues band"." Together, they released "Trouble Every Day" as a single with "" A-side "Who Are the Brain Police?"

A re-arranged version appeared on the Mothers' 1974 live album Roxy & Elsewhere (and on the 1991 live album The Best Band You Never Heard in Your Life) as "More Trouble Every Day". These subsequent versions were more up-tempo and usually featured a strong horn intro and punctuation.

== Covers ==
The UK underground artist Mick Farren covered the song on his album Vampires Stole My Lunch Money (1978); a live version featuring Farren on vocals and Wayne Kramer on guitar, appears on the 1984 album Human Garbage by The Deviants. Australian stoner rock band Tumbleweed covered the song as a B-side on their 1993 single "Daddy Long Legs". George Thorogood and the Destroyers included a cover of the song on their 1997 album Rockin' My Life Away.

Louisa Roach of the British band She Drew The Gun rewrote some of the lyrics to reflect recent riots and demonstrations in the UK. The rewrite received the blessing of the Frank Zappa estate and the record was released in August 2019.

The Specials covered the song on their 2021 album Protest Songs 1924-2012.

== Other references ==
French film maker Claire Denis named her 2001 film Trouble Every Day after the song.

The Frank Zappa tribute band Trouble Every Day named itself after this song.

== Bibliography ==
- Greene, Doyle (2016). Rock, Counterculture and the Avant-Garde, 1966-1970: How the Beatles, Frank Zappa and the Velvet Underground Defined an Era. McFarland. ISBN 978-1-4766-6214-5.
- New Society. New Society Limited. 1968.
- Gilliland, John (1969). "Revolt of the Fat Angel: American musicians respond to the British invaders" (audio). Pop Chronicles. University of North Texas Libraries.
- Lowe, Kelly Fisher (2006). The words and music of Frank Zappa. Greenwood Publishing Group. ISBN 978-0-275-98779-4.
- Slaven, Neil [in German] (2003). Electric Don Quixote: The Definitive Story of Frank Zappa. Omnibus Press. ISBN 978-0-7119-9436-2.
- Strong, Charles Martin (2006). The Essential Rock Discography (Edition 8). Open City Books. ISBN 978-1-84195-860-6.
- Zappa, Frank (June 1968). "The Incredible History Of The Mothers". Hit Parader. Archived from the original on October 14, 2007.
- Zappa, Frank; Occiogrosso, Peter (1989). The Real Frank Zappa Book. Poseidon Press. ISBN 978-0-671-63870-2.
