= Ray White =

American musician and singer (born 1945)

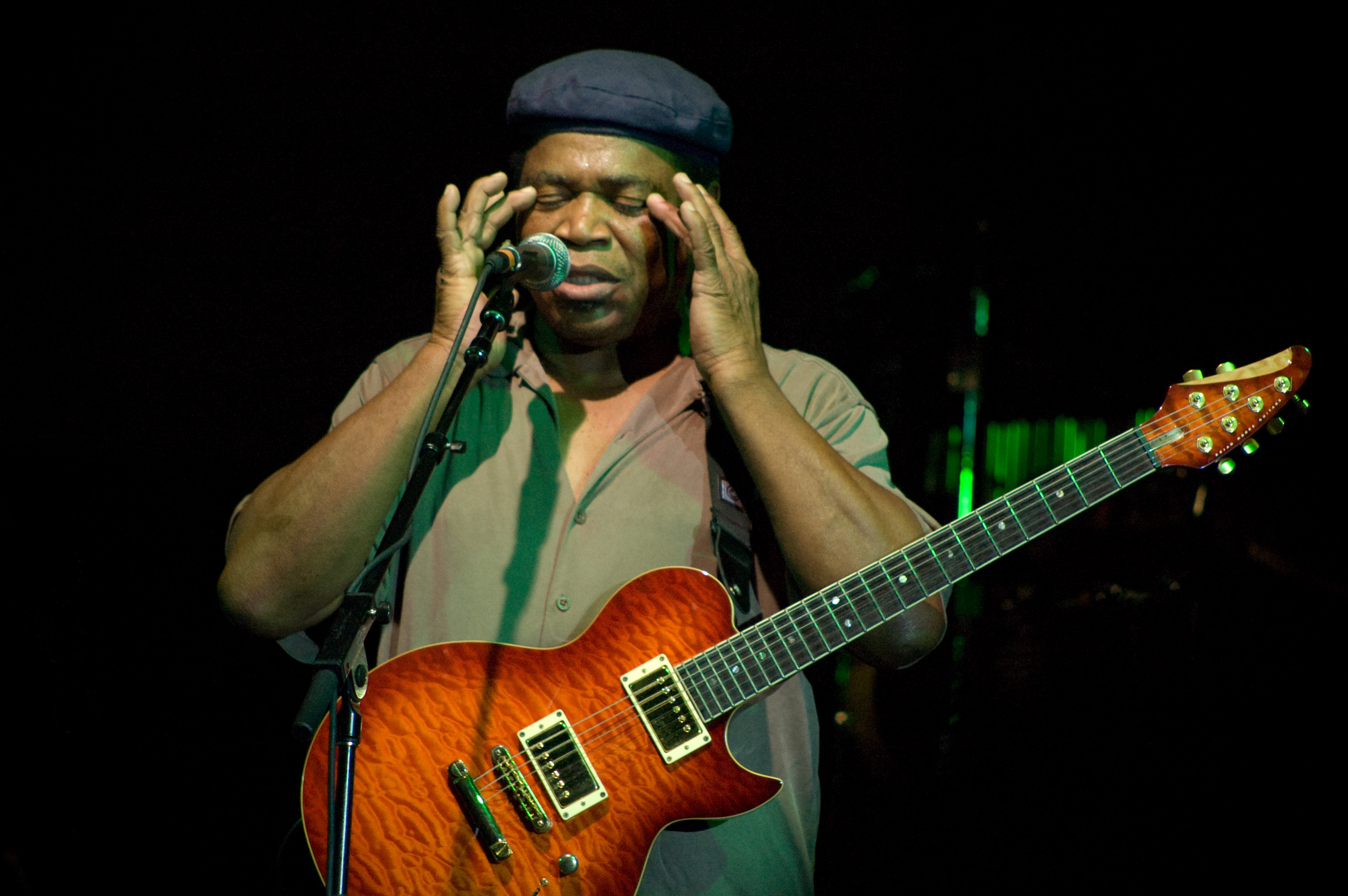
- Ray White with Zappa Plays Zappa, Copenhagen, 2007

Background information
- Born: July 11, 1945; Arkansas, U.S.
- Genres: Rock and roll, blues rock, soul
- Occupation: Musician
- Instruments: Vocals, guitar
- Labels: DiscReet Records, BlueSideDownStudios Recordings, Forecast Music
- Formerly of: KVHW

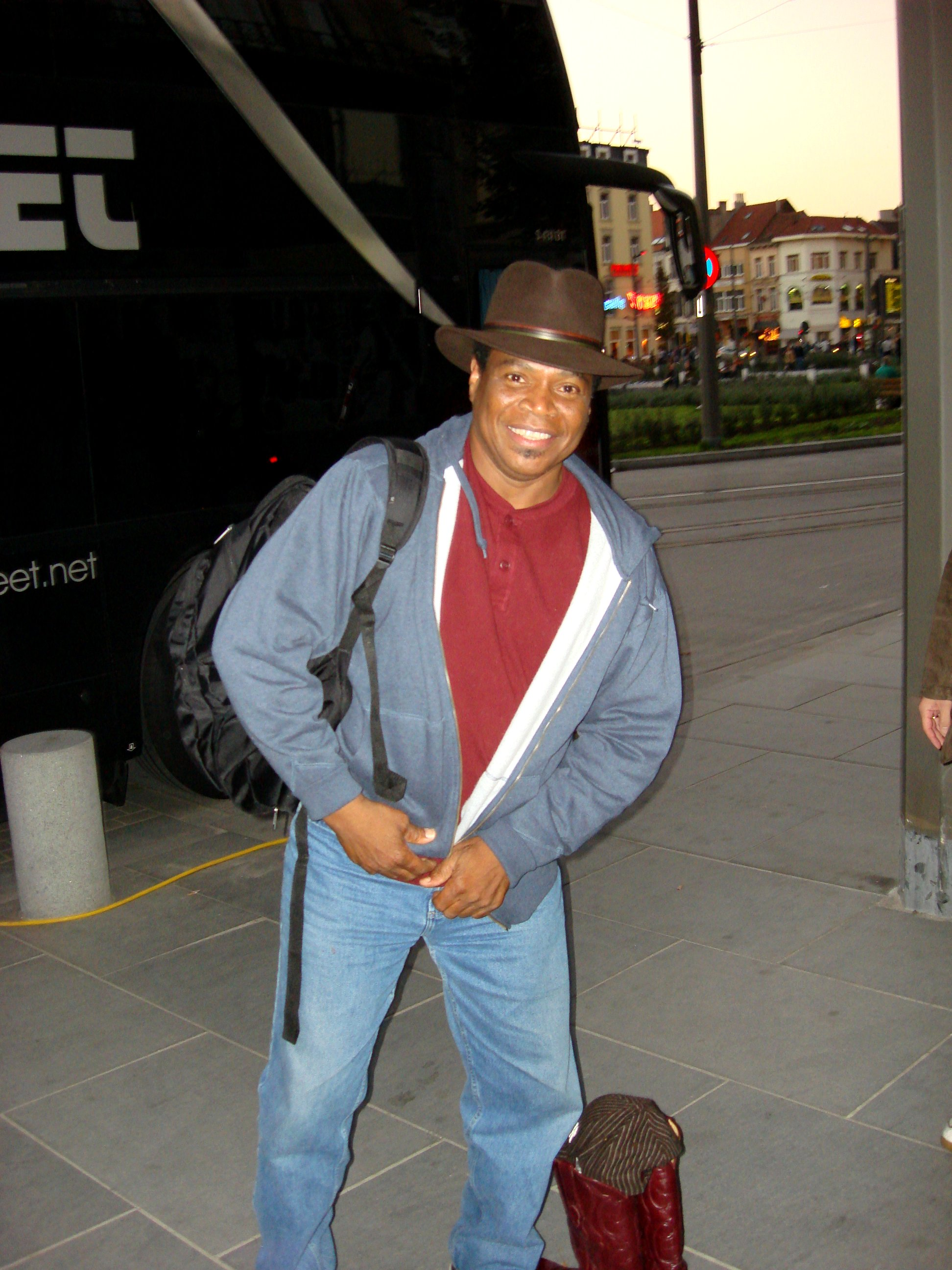
Ray White outside the Antwerp Zappa Plays Zappa concert

Ray Shirley White Sr. (born July 11, 1945) is an American musician and singer, best known as a member of Frank Zappa's touring ensembles. He was drafted into Zappa's band in late 1976, being featured on rhythm guitar and vocals, forming a vocal harmony partnership with Ike Willis on later tours in 1980 and 1984. White's vocals can be heard on Zappa in New York (March 1978) and You Are What You Is (September 1981) as well as others. White can also be found on a The Torture Never Stops and Does Humor Belong in Music?; the former is a DVD from Zappa's 1981 tour (without Ike Willis) and the latter filmed at the pier in New York in 1984; the video features White and Ike Willis' vocal harmonies. According to Zappa, White, who was deeply religious, was uncomfortable with the atheistic views of some of the other band members, which led to his departure.

White has also worked with jam-oriented groups like KVHW, Don't Push the Clown and Umphrey's McGee since his contributions to the Zappa band, and has worked with a variety of Michigan artists, including former Rare Earth drummer Bob Weaver, as well as members of the funk/fusion combo Generic Produce.

In 2007 Ray White joined Dweezil Zappa as a special guest for the Zappa Plays Zappa Tour. White is also a member of the group Band From Utopia (also called Banned from Utopia), formed by former members of different formations of Frank Zappa's band who wanted to pay tribute to his work.

White is also a member of the Zappa Band, an alumni band consisting of former Frank Zappa contributors keyboardist/guitarist Mike Keneally, multi-instrumentalist Robert Martin, bassist Scott Thunes, drummer Joe Travers, guitarist Jamie Kime and White on vocals and guitar.
