= Robert Martin (singer) =

American musician (born 1948)

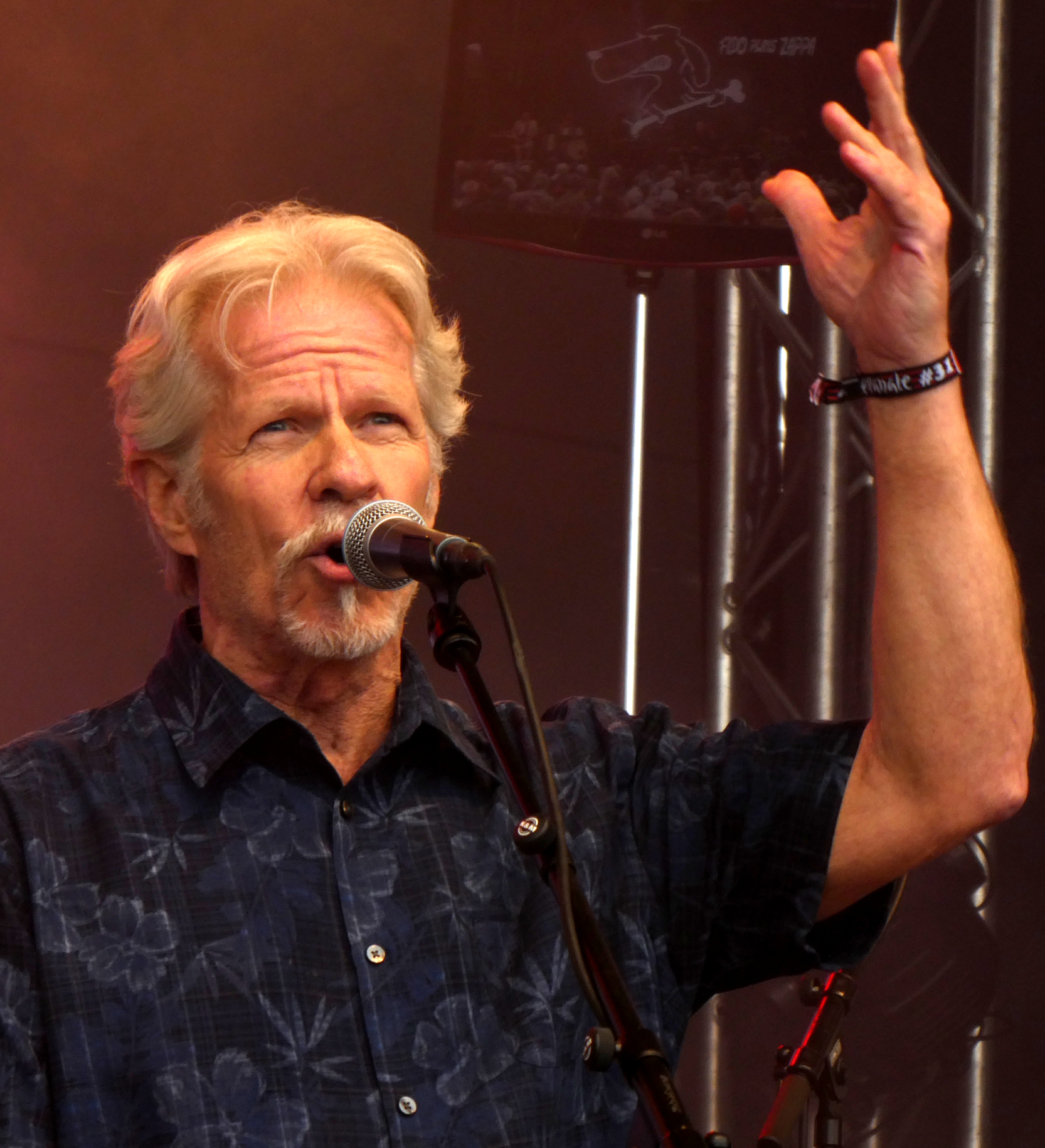
- Robert Martin on the stage with Zappawoman Trio (Zappanale 2022)

Background information
- Also known as: Bobby Martin
- Born: Robert Allen Martin; June 29, 1948 (age 78); Philadelphia, Pennsylvania
- Genres: Rock, R&B, jazz, classical
- Occupation: Musician
- Instruments: Vocals, saxophone, french horn, keyboards, flute, harmonica, Alphorn

Robert "Bobby" Martin (born June 29, 1948) is an American singer, songwriter and multi-instrumentalist born in Philadelphia, Pennsylvania. Martin sings and plays keyboards, horn, saxophones and other instruments. He is mainly known for collaborating in the 1980s with the musician Frank Zappa, although he is also a session musician, composer of music for cinema, theater, television and advertising, musical director and music teacher. He also directs music production company Think Method Production with Stephen Boyd. He recognizes as musical influences Ray Charles, Stravinsky, Coltrane, Rachmaninoff, Mose Allison, Cannonball Adderley, David "Fathead" Newman, Steely Dan, Frank Zappa and Etta James.

== Biography ==
=== Childhood ===
Martin was born in Philadelphia in June 1948, the son of opera singers. His grandmother worked at RCA in Trenton, New Jersey, giving Robert access to a variety of 78 RPM records. He was exposed to a broad spectrum of music from childhood. The Firebird by Igor Stravinsky made a powerful impression, and he also enjoyed Big Band jazz, rock music on American Bandstand, and later took an interest in avant-garde rock and Philadelphia soul.

At home his parents had a Lester Spinet piano, which Martin played informally and took lessons starting at age 8. After leading to read music, he studied mostly on his own. Martin learned to play horn in elementary school. A few years later he became passionate about the blues and wanted to play the saxophone after listening to saxophonist David "Fathead" Newman on Ray Charles records. Finally at age 13 he persuaded the head of the band to let him play the saxophone. After a few weeks he had learned the instrument well enough to become the main tenor of the band.

He is largely self-taught as a singer and instrumentalist, except the french horn which he studied at the Curtis Institute of Music. While he was an outstanding student at high school, a member of the National Honor Society, and an accomplished sportsman (a wrestling champion and excellent baseball player who considered playing professionally), he preferred to pursue music.

In 1969, Martin entered the Curtis Institute of Music where he undertook intensive classical studies. At Curtis, he studied under Mason Jones, the principal horn player of the Philadelphia Orchestra. Martin also performed the classical repertoire under conductors Eugene Ormandy, Claudio Abbado, Lorin Maazel and Seiji Ozawa.

=== Career ===
Martin began his professional career in his own city, before heading to the west coast. He performed as a session musician in recording studios at Sigma Sound Studios in Philadelphia. Between 1969 and 1974, Martin interpreted the french horn in a variety of successful songs of that time. At this stage he played on many records that helped to establish the Philadelphia soul sound, such as "Me and Mrs. Jones", "Back Stabbers", "Love Train", and "If You Don't Know Me by Now". He can be heard on records produced by the successful team of producers and songwriters Gamble and Huff of Philadelphia International Records. There he played horn on many sessions arranged by another well known Bobby Martin, the gifted TSOP arranger, producer and composer of the label.

Regarding his role as singer, Etta James was his great mentor, who encouraged him to sing with her in her live performances over a period of fifteen years.

In the 1970s he was part of Orleans, a group from Woodstock.

In 1978 he performed horn and saxophone on two Justin Hayward songs on the Moody Blues Octave album.

In 1981 Dave Robb, top technician on the road crew for Orleans in the 1970s, told Robert that Frank Zappa needed a musician for the 1981 tour. He was scheduled to audition the next day. In the audition Zappa put Martin to the test on keyboards, tenor saxophone and horn. He asked him to transpose keyboard parts to horn and saxophone, as well as follow polyrhythms and metric modulations. But it was Martin's vocal ability that secured his place in the band, especially his ability to sing melodies an octave higher than expected in natural voice, without the need of falsetto. He subsequently performed on all Zappa's tours and albums until the last tour in 1988.

Between tours with Zappa, he obtained the position of musical director for Cybill Shepherd and Bette Midler, and worked with Paul McCartney, Michael McDonald, Stevie Nicks, Boz Scaggs, Etta James (on tour with The Rolling Stones), Patti LaBelle, Bonnie Raitt, Kenny Loggins, and many others.

In 1985-86 he toured with Michael McDonald.

Since 1986, Martin has owned and operated his own studio and has diversified into programming, engineering, mixing, mastering and producing music for advertising, film and television.

In 1987 he performed on, arranged and co-produced the album American Soul Man for Wilson Pickett on Motown Records.

He composed the music for the CBS television program Cybill, and was the show's musical director. While working on the show he became the partner of its star, Cybill Shepherd. He also composed for Baywatch, Martial Law and three seasons of the Lifetime Television program Intimate Portrait. Regarding this aspect of his musical life Martin has stated that it served to "pay the bills".

Before departing Philadelphia, Robert contributed his horn playing to numerous hit records produced by the renowned songwriting team Gamble, Huff, and Bell. Although his recording career began with the French horn, Martin expanded to include keyboards, saxophone, and vocals. Multi-instrumentalism became a hallmark of his work as he toured and recorded with the Woodstock-based pop group Orleans.

Martin joined Frank Zappa's band in the summer of 1981, performing on all of Zappa's tours and live albums from that point forward. His vocals were highlighted during a staple show closer and encore for Zappa's tours from 1981 through 1988 - a cover of The Allman Brothers' 'Whipping Post'.

Over the past three decades, Martin has collaborated with former Frank Zappa bandmates such as Chad Wackerman, Ike Willis, Ray White, Tom Fowler, Scott Thunes, Albert Wing, Arthur Barrow, and Mike Keneally. He has also collaborated with Robbie "Seahag" Mangano, Mike Miller, Jamie Kime, Joe Travers, Joel Taylor, and Morgan Ågren, among many others.

Robert was also a featured performer at the annual Zappanale Festival in Bad Doberan, Germany, in the years 2009, 2010, 2011, 2012, 2022, 2023, and 2025, performing with Banned From Utopia and appearing as a special guest with Project/Object, Gargantua, Dead Dino Storage, Bogus Pomp, Treacherous Cretins, Sheik Yerbouti, Collectif LeBocal, The Central Scrutinizer Band, and the Zappawoman Trio.

In between touring with Zappa, he worked as musical director for Bette Midler. He has also worked with Paul McCartney, Michael McDonald, Stevie Nicks, Boz Scaggs, Etta James, Patti LaBelle, Bonnie Raitt, and Kenny Loggins, and many others.

He has performed at the Festival of Music and Dance in Bangkok with RGA Productions, under the direction of producer Rob Asselstine. Productions Robert has contributed to include WRSO, Return to Grace, Rock and Soul, Cruisin Classics, Country Classics, Frankenstein, and 6 Chicks.

He was with The Troubadour Theater Company in Burbank for four years, and was musical director for “Little Egypt” at The Matrix Theater in Hollywood and the New York Musical Theater Festival.

Beyond his performance career, Robert recorded a solo album for MCA Records and collaborated with a diverse array of legendary musicians such as Prince, The Moody Blues, Lyle Lovett, Gladys Knight, Glenn Frey, Bobby Caldwell, Michael Bolton, David Sanborn, The Stylistics, The O'Jays, Sheila E, and The Blues Brothers. He notably played keyboards, provided backing vocals, arranged, mixed, and co-produced Wilson Pickett's 1987 Grammy-nominated Motown album, American Soul Man.

Since 1986, Robert has owned and operated his own recording studio, venturing into programming, engineering, mixing, mastering, and producing music for advertising, film, and television. His compositions include the score for the Emmy and Golden Globe-winning CBS television show Cybill, as well as music for Baywatch, Martial Law, and three seasons of Lifetime Television's Intimate Portrait series.

Dedicated to education, Robert has conducted live Master Classes focusing on the advanced harmony and theory of Frank Zappa, integrating live performance, visual aids, and interactive Q&A sessions. His background—combining classical training with experience in contemporary music and close mentorship from Zappa—qualifies him to elucidate Frank Zappa's musical approach.

== Discography ==
- Discography on AllMusic
- Discography on United Mutations
