= Henry Oden =

American blues musician from California (born 1947)

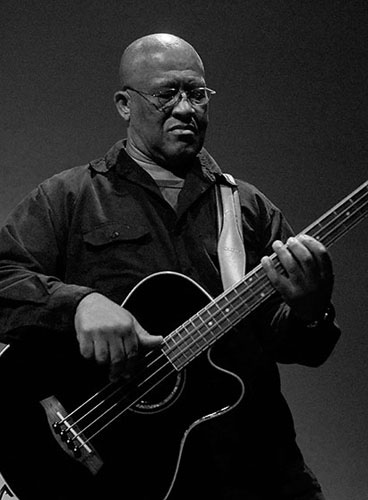
- Henry Oden playing bass with the Joe Lewis Walker band in 2010.

Background information
- Born: February 8, 1947 (age 78); Oakland, California, United States
- Genres: Blues

Henry Oden (born February 8, 1947) is an American blues musician from California.

== Biography ==
Born in Oakland, Oden grew up in Richmond. His parents had migrated from the south to work in the shipyards, and Oden's father bought him a guitar from a Montgomery Ward catalogue when he was 15 years old. He was taught to play by Robert Kelton, a guitarist for Jimmy McCracklin, and within a year he was sitting in on jam sessions around the local area; he would also play and sing in local churches. In the 1960s he was the bass player with Freddy & The Stone Souls, working with Freddie Stone Stewart, brother of Sly Stone, and backing many local acts such as Rodger Collins and Fillmore Slim. He was also a member of Loading Zone, and recorded behind the group's vocalist Linda Tillery when the group split up.

In the 1970s, Oden toured for a short while with Freddie King, and helped to develop the career of Lady Bianca. He returned to music in his own right in the early 1980s, working with Mark Naftalin's Blue Monday band, recording with Clifton Chenier, and touring internationally and recording with the San Francisco Blues Festival package. In the middle of the decade he teamed up with Joe Louis Walker, providing Walker with "Shade Tree Mechanic" (among other songs throughout the years). This relationship was spasmodic, and for a while Oden based himself in Canada, taking a degree in humanities. Over the years, Oden appeared with: Jimmy Reed, Pee Wee Crayton, Big Mama Thornton, Mike Bloomfield, Buddy Ace, Curtis Lawson, Bill Withers, Little Joe Blue, Chris Cain, Percy Mayfield, Craig Horton, J.J. Malone, Troyce Key, Cool Papa Sadler, Mississippi Johnny Waters, Big Bones, Sonny Rhodes, Earl King, Johnny Adams, Maria Muldaur and Boz Scaggs.

Oden has two releases under his own name, and he has appeared on numerous albums (his website discography lists 27). He appeared behind John Lee Hooker in the film Survivors, and he can be seen and heard on the Blue Monday videos, and with Percy Mayfield in Poet Laureate of the Blues.

== Discography ==
- Eclectic Blue (C.P.Time 001) (1990)
- Henry Oden (C.P. Time) (2006)
- You're Wrong For That (C.P. Time) (2010)
