= List of West Coast blues musicians =

The following is a list of West Coast blues musicians.

- Dave Alexander
- Charlie Baty
- Juke Boy Bonner
- Freddie Brooks
- Charles Brown
- Roy Brown
- William Clarke
- Pee Wee Crayton
- Sugar Pie DeSanto
- Floyd Dixon
- Jesse Fuller
- Johnny Fuller
- Lowell Fulson
- Cecil Gant
- Lloyd Glenn
- Peppermint Harris
- Roy Hawkins
- Johnny Heartsman
- Duke Henderson
- Ivory Joe Hunter
- Etta James
- Troyce Key
- Little Willie Littlefield
- Robert Lowery
- J.J. Malone
- Percy Mayfield
- Jimmy McCracklin
- Big Jay McNeely
- Amos Milburn
- Roy Milton
- Jimmy Nelson
- Johnny Otis
- Honey Piazza
- Rod Piazza
- Sonny Rhodes
- L. C. Robinson
- Haskell Sadler
- George "Harmonica" Smith
- Freddie Stone
- Lafayette Thomas
- Big Mama Thornton
- Luther Tucker
- Eddie Vinson
- Joe Louis Walker
- T-Bone Walker
- Johnny "Guitar" Watson
- Junior Watson
