= Zappa/Erie =

Box set by Frank Zappa
- Released: June 17, 2022
- Recorded: May 8, 1974 – November 13, 1976
- Genres: Jazz fusion; experimental rock; progressive rock
- Length: 417:49
- Label: Zappa Records
- Producers: Ahmet Zappa; Joe Travers

Frank Zappa chronology
The Mothers 1971 (2022)	Zappa/Erie (2022)	Zappa '75: Zagreb/Ljubljana (2022)

Zappa/Erie is a live album by Frank Zappa, released posthumously on June 17, 2022. The album is a six CD boxset consisting of several shows performed in the Erie, Pennsylvania area in 1974 and 1976. All the material is previously unreleased, except for roughly ten minutes of audio that appeared on Roxy & Elsewhere (1974) in an edited form.

== Background ==
The first two discs contain a full show from the "10 Years of Mothers" tour from the spring of 1974. The touring band had much of the same lineup as The Roxy performances of 1973, with members Walt Fowler, Don Preston, and Jeff Simmons, and without percussionist Ruth Underwood, who was busy elsewhere at the time. Recorded at Edinboro State College, Pennsylvania, the setlist contains many reworked versions of tracks from 1960s era Mothers of Invention, from albums Freak Out!, We're Only in It for the Money, and Weasels Ripped My Flesh, as well as songs that were performed throughout 1973 and 1974.

The third disc contains two tracks recorded four days later in South Bend, Indiana. The rest of the third disc and all of the fourth contain a full show performed at the Gannon Auditorium in Erie, on November 12, 1974. The six piece band toured throughout the summer and fall, and appear on other recordings from that era including the Helsinki Concert on You Can't Do That on Stage Anymore, Vol. 2 (1988), and A Token of His Extreme (2013).

The fifth and sixth discs mostly contain an Erie show recorded two years later, on November 12, 1976, at the Erie County Fieldhouse, with select tracks from the surrounding dates in Toledo, Ohio, and Montreal, Quebec. This band toured throughout the fall of 1976, and was the first tour to feature Patrick O'Hearn on bass and Ray White on vocals and guitar. The band also featured "Lady" Bianca Oden during her brief stint on vocals and keyboards before she had to leave the group, and appears on the Vaulternative Records release Philly '76 (2009).

== Track listing ==
CD 1: Live from Edinboro, PA - May 8, 1974
No.	Title	Length
1.	"Someone Has Just Asked Me..."	5:38
2.	"Cosmik Debris"	12:49
3.	"Pygmy Twylyte"	7:03
4.	"The Idiot Bastard Son"	2:16
5.	"Cheepnis"	5:14
6.	"Inca Roads"	14:34
7.	"Montana"	7:51
8.	"Dupree's Paradise (Intro)"	14:05
Total length:		69:35

CD 2: Live From Edinboro, PA - May 8, 1974 (cont'd)
No.	Title	Length
1.	"Dupree's Paradise"	22:25
2.	"It Can't Happen Here"	1:52
3.	"Hungry Freaks, Daddy"	2:40
4.	"You're Probably Wondering Why I'm Here"	2:37
5.	"How Could I Be Such a Fool?"	3:34
6.	"I Ain't Got No Heart"	2:29
7.	"I'm Not Satisfied"	2:16
8.	"Wowie Zowie"	2:53
9.	"Let's Make the Water Turn Black"	2:01
10.	"Harry, You're a Beast"	1:03
11.	"The Orange County Lumber Truck"	0:58
12.	"Oh No"	1:22
13.	"Son of Orange County"	11:05
14.	"More Trouble Every Day"	9:16
15.	"Camarillo Brillo"	5:22
Total length:		72:01

CD 3: Live from Erie, PA - November 12, 1974 (tracks 1–2 recorded South Bend, IN - May 12, 1974)
No.	Title	Length
1.	"Montana" (Bonus Track)	6:11
2.	"Get Down" (Bonus Track)	6:40
3.	"Tush Tush Tush (A Token of My Extreme)"	4:50
4.	"Stink-Foot"	7:38
5.	"RDNZL"	10:03
6.	"Village of the Sun"	4:39
7.	"Echidna's Arf (Of You)"	3:21
8.	"Don't You Ever Wash That Thing?"	6:37
9.	"Penguin in Bondage"	7:56
10.	"T'Mershi Duween"	3:19
11.	"The Dog Breath Variations"	1:37
12.	"Uncle Meat"	2:20
13.	"Building a Girl"	2:49
14.	"Dinah-Moe Humm"	7:37
Total length:		75:44

CD 4: Live from Erie, PA - November 12, 1974 (cont'd)
No.	Title	Length
1.	"I'm Not Satisfied"	3:41
2.	"Montana"	10:14
3.	"Dupree's Paradise (Intro)"	7:54
4.	"Dupree's Paradise"	17:46
5.	"Don't Eat the Yellow Snow"	13:25
6.	"Tush Tush Tush (End Vamp)"	2:04
7.	"Oh No"	1:28
8.	"Son of Orange County"	4:42
9.	"More Trouble Every Day"	6:37
Total length:		67:24

CD 5: Live from Erie, PA - November 12, 1976 (track 8 recorded Toledo, OH - November 13, 1976)
No.	Title	Length
1.	"The Purple Lagoon"	3:52
2.	"Stink-Foot"	6:12
3.	"The Poodle Lecture"	3:25
4.	"Dirty Love"	3:25
5.	"Wind Up Workin' in a Gas Station"	2:37
6.	"Tryin' To Grow a Chin"	3:56
7.	"The Torture Never Stops"	12:44
8.	"City of Tiny Lites"	7:54
9.	"Pound for a Brown"	6:18
10.	"You Didn't Try to Call Me"	6:20
11.	"Rudy Wants to Buy Yez a Drink"	2:13
12.	"Would You Go All the Way?"	2:05
Total length:		61:07

CD 6: Live from Erie, PA - November 12, 1976 (cont'd) [track 12 recorded Montreal, QC, Canada - November 10, 1976, tracks 13–14 recorded Toledo, OH - November 13, 1976]
No.	Title	Length
1.	"Black Napkins"	18:55
2.	"Terry's Erie '76 Solo"	2:56
3.	"Patrick's Erie '76 Solo"	2:43
4.	"Wonderful Wino"	4:52
5.	"The Purple Lagoon (Outro)"	0:58
6.	"Stranded in the Jungle"	3:49
7.	"Dinah-Moe Humm"	6:29
8.	"The Purple Lagoon (Outro)"	0:53
9.	"Camarillo Brillo"	3:42
10.	"Muffin Man"	4:17
11.	"The Purple Lagoon (Outro)"	0:47
12.	"You Didn't Try to Call Me" (Bonus Track)	6:04
13.	"Black Napkins" (Bonus Track)	13:43
14.	"The Purple Lagoon (Outro)" (Bonus Track)	0:42
Total length:		70:58

== Personnel ==
=== Spring 1974 band ===
- Frank Zappa – guitar, vocals, percussion
- Bruce Fowler – trombone (the golden instrument that goes in and out)
- Walt Fowler – trumpet
- Tom Fowler – Bass
- Napoleon Murphy Brock – tenor sax, lead vocals
- Don Preston – synthesizer
- Ralph Humphrey – drums
- Chester Thompson – drums
- Jeff Simmons – guitar, harmonica
- George Duke – keyboards

=== Fall 1974 band ===
- Frank Zappa – guitar, vocals, percussion
- Ruth Underwood – percussion
- Napoleon Murphy Brock – tenor sax, lead vocals
- Chester Thompson – drums
- Tom Fowler – bass
- George Duke – keyboards

=== Fall 1976 band ===
- Frank Zappa – lead guitar, vocals
- Ray White – guitar, vocals
- Patrick O'Hearn – bass
- Terry Bozzio – drums, vocals
- Eddie Jobson – keyboards, "mystery" violin
- Bianca Oden – keyboards, vocals
