= Leon Haywood =

American funk and soul singer, songwriter, and record producer (1942–2016)

- Born: Otha Leon Haywood; February 11, 1942; Houston, Texas, U.S.
- Died: April 5, 2016 (aged 74) Los Angeles, California, U.S.
- Genres: Soul, R&B, funk
- Occupations: Singer, songwriter, arranger, record producer
- Instrument: Keyboards
- Years active: 1963–2016
- Labels: Imperial, Decca, 20th Century, Columbia, MCA, Casablanca, Modern, Edge, Evejim

Otha Leon Haywood (February 11, 1942 – April 5, 2016) was an American funk and soul singer, songwriter, and record producer. He is best known for his 1975 hit single "I Want'a Do Something Freaky to You", which has been frequently sampled by musicians such as Dr. Dre (for his 1992 hit "Nuthin' but a 'G' Thang") among others.

== Career ==
Born in Houston, he listened to the blues as a child and started playing piano at the age of three. In his teens, he performed with a local group and worked as an accompanist to blues musician, Guitar Slim. In the early 1960s, he moved to Los Angeles, California, where he worked with saxophonist Big Jay McNeely. McNeely arranged for him to record his first single, "Without a Love", an instrumental on the small Swingin' record label. After that, he joined Sam Cooke's band as keyboardist until the singer's death. Haywood next recorded two singles for Fantasy Records, and subsequently moved to Imperial Records, where he recorded the single "She's with Her Other Love", which made the R&B charts in 1965.

Haywood was also part of two session bands organized by Los Angeles disc jockey Magnificent Montague which issued the instrumental hits "Hole in the Wall" (R&B, No. 5/Pop, No. 50, 1965) under the name of the Packers, and "Precious Memories" (R&B, No. 31, 1967) billed as the Romeos. In 1967, Haywood secured his first solo hit with "It's Got to Be Mellow" (R&B, No. 21 and Pop, No. 63) on Decca Records. He played on further recording sessions with the Packers and Dyke & the Blazers, then returned to recording under his own name. He also established in 1967 a production company, Evejim, named after his parents.

Haywood recorded, without too much success for the Fat Fish (Hollywood, Ca.) label in 1966 and 1967. Two singles from that source were given a UK release at the time on the Decca distributed Vocalion label but gathered few sales – "Skate a While" and "Ain't No Use".

He found only sporadic success as a singer, including with "It's Got to Be Mellow" and "Keep It in the Family". After recording for Columbia Records, he moved over to MCA Records. He emerged as a star in the 1970s by modifying his style to incorporate the emerging funk and disco idioms. Haywood joined 20th Century Records in 1974 and was immediately successful, notably with "I Want'a Do Something Freaky to You" (R&B, No. 7 and Pop No. 15, 1975), "Strokin' (Pt. II)" (R&B, No. 13, 1976) and "Party" (R&B, No. 24, 1978). In 1980, Haywood revived the shuffle beat of 1950s rock and roll with "Don't Push It Don't Force It" (R&B, No. 2 and Pop, No. 49). This single also reached No. 12 in the UK Singles Chart, where he is considered a one-hit wonder.

Haywood is credited with writing the 1981 hit "She's a Bad Mama Jama (She's Built, She's Stacked)" by Carl Carlton, which he produced in his own studio. In 1983, he released the album It's Me Again, which featured a couple minor R&B hits. His last R&B chart record was "Tenderoni" (No. 22) in 1984, but the accompanying album, Now and Then went unreleased (although the single was featured on a similarly-titled compilation album, Then & Now, which surfaced five years later). After a few more chart singles, for Casablanca Records and Modern Records, Haywood's output failed to excite the public's taste. In the late 1980s, he became associated in an executive/production capacity with the Los Angeles-based Edge Records. From the 1980s, he produced blues albums by Jimmy McCracklin, Clay Hammond, Ronnie Lovejoy, Buddy Ace and others on his own Evejim Records label.

He died in his sleep on April 5, 2016, aged 74.

== Discography ==
=== Albums ===
- The Mellow Mellow Leon Haywood (Galaxy, 1964)
- Soul Cargo (Fat Fish, 1966)
- It's Got to Be Mellow (Decca, 1967)
- Back to Stay (20th Century, 1973)
- Keep It in the Family (20th Century, 1974)
- Come and Get Yourself Some (20th Century, 1975)
- Intimate (Columbia, 1976)
- Hey! Mr BigBen (20th Century, 1976)
- Double My Pleasure (MCA, 1978)
- Energy (MCA, 1979)
- Naturally (20th Century, 1980)
- It's Me Again (Casablanca, 1983)
- Freaky Man (Evejim, 1994)
- The Legacy of Dr. Martin Luther King Jr. (There Ain't Enough Hate Around) (Evejim, 1996)

=== Singles ===
Year	Single	Chart Positions			Record label
Year	Single	US Pop	US R&B	UK	Record label
1965	"She's With Her Other Love"; Leon Hayward	92	13	—	Imperial
1967	"It's Got to Be Mellow"	63	21	—	Decca
1968	"Mellow Moonlight"	92	35	—	Decca
1974	"Keep It in the Family"	50	11	—	20th Century
1974	"Long As There's You (I Got Love)"	—	63	—	20th Century
1974	"Sugar Lump"	108	35	—	20th Century
1974	"Believe Half of What You See (And None of What You Hear)"	94	21	—	20th Century
1975	"Come an' Get Yourself Some"	83	19	—	20th Century
1975	"I Want'a Do Something Freaky to You"	15	7	—	20th Century
1976	"Just Your Fool"	102	26	—	20th Century
1976	"Strokin' (Pt. II)"	101	13	—	20th Century
1976	"The Streets Will Love You to Death - Part 1"	107	63	—	Columbia
1977	"Super Sexy"	—	54	—	MCA
1978	"Double My Pleasure"	—	91	—	MCA
1978	"Fine and Healthy Thing"	—	84	—	MCA
1978	"Party"	—	24	—	MCA
1980	"Don't Push It Don't Force It"	49	2	12	20th Century
1980	"If You're Lookin' for a Night of Fun (Look Past Me, I'm Not the One)"	—	67	—	20th Century
1983	"I'm Out to Catch"; Leon Haywood featuring Karen Roberts	—	27	—	Casablanca
1983	"T. V. Mama"	—	83	—	Casablanca
1984	"Tenderoni"	—	22	—	Modern
"—" denotes releases that did not chart or were not released in that territory.
