= Zappa '75: Zagreb/Ljubljana =

Live album by Frank Zappa
- Released: October 14, 2022
- Recorded: November 21–22, 1975
- Genre: Progressive rock
- Length: 145:56
- Label: Zappa Records
- Producers: Ahmet Zappa and Joe Travers

Frank Zappa chronology
Zappa/Erie (2022)	Zappa '75: Zagreb/Ljubljana (2022)	Waka/Wazoo (2022)

Zappa '75: Zagreb/Ljubljana is a live album by Frank Zappa, released posthumously on October 14, 2022. The album was recorded during the Yugoslavian leg of Zappa's fall, 1975 tour.

== Track listing ==
Disc one
No.	Title	Recorded	Length
1.	"Managua"	Zagreb, November 21, 1975	2:11
2.	"Stink-Foot"	Zagreb, November 21, 1975	8:44
3.	"The Poodle Lecture"	Zagreb, November 21, 1975	2:50
4.	"Dirty Love"	Zagreb, November 21, 1975	3:29
5.	"How Could I Be Such a Fool?"	Ljubljana, November 22, 1975	4:36
6.	"I Ain't Got No Heart"	Ljubljana, November 22, 1975	2:39
7.	"I'm Not Satisfied"	Ljubljana, November 22, 1975	1:58
8.	"Black Napkins"	Zagreb, November 21, 1975	9:33
9.	"Advance Romance"	Ljubljana, November 22, 1975	9:36
10.	"Honey, Don't You Want a Man Like Me?"	Ljubljana, November 22, 1975	3:43
11.	"The Illinois Enema Bandit"	Zagreb, November 21, 1975	8:12
12.	"Carolina Hardcore Ecstasy"	Zagreb, November 21, 1975	5:13
13.	"Lonely Little Girl"	Zagreb, November 21, 1975	2:39
14.	"Take Your Clothes Off When You Dance"	Ljubljana, November 22, 1975	2:04
15.	"What's the Ugliest Part of Your Body?"	Ljubljana, November 22, 1975	1:06
16.	"Chunga's Revenge (Part I)"	Zagreb, November 21, 1975	7:57
Total length:			76:30

Disc two
No.	Title	Recorded	Length
1.	"Chunga's Revenge (Part II)"	Zagreb, November 21, 1975	11:51
2.	"Terry's Zagreb Solo"	Zagreb, November 21, 1975	5:41
3.	"Zoot Allures"	Zagreb, November 21, 1975	7:32
4.	"Filthy Habits (Prototype)"	Zagreb, November 21, 1975	3:54
5.	"Camarillo Brillo"	Zagreb, November 21, 1975	3:38
6.	"Muffin Man"	Zagreb, November 21, 1975	5:29
7.	"I'm the Slime"	Ljubljana, November 22, 1975	6:08
8.	"San Ber'dino"	Ljubljana, November 22, 1975	6:40

Bonus Tracks
No.	Title	Recorded	Length
9.	"Wind Up Workin' in a Gas Station"	Ljubljana, November 22, 1975	5:05
10.	"Terry's Ljubljana Solo"	Ljubljana, November 22, 1975	6:23
11.	"Zoot Allures"	Ljubljana, November 22, 1975	7:05
Total length:			69:36

== Personnel ==
- Frank Zappa − guitar, vocals
- Terry Bozzio − drums
- Andre Lewis − keyboards
- Napoleon Murphy Brock − tenor saxophone, lead vocals
- Norma Bell − alto & soprano saxophone, vocals
- Roy Estrada − bass
