= Lafayette Thomas =

American blues singer and guitarist (1928–1977)

- Also known as: Lafayette "The Thing" Thomas; L. J. Thomas
- Born: June 13, 1928; Shreveport, Louisiana, U.S.
- Died: May 20, 1977 (aged 48) Brisbane, California, U.S.
- Genres: Blues
- Instruments: Vocals, guitar, piano
- Years active: 1947–1975

Lafayette Jerl Thomas (June 13, 1928 – May 20, 1977) was an American blues singer, and guitarist.

== Early life ==
Thomas was born on June 13, 1928, in Shreveport, Louisiana. He sang in a local church choir as a youth, and was first introduced to blues guitar by his uncle, musician Jesse "Babyface" Thomas.

== Career ==
Thomas began his music career in 1947 after a move to San Francisco, California, playing with Al Simmons’ Rhythm Rockers. The following year he joined Jimmy McCracklin's band, and continued to work and record with McCracklin for most of the rest of his life. He also frequently recorded on sessions with other singers, including Jimmy Wilson, from the late 1940s into the 1950s. As well as recording with McCracklin, Wilson and others, Thomas recorded a number of sessions of his own during the 1950s, appearing as L. J. Thomas and his Louisiana Playboys, or "Thing" Thomas, on Chess, as Jerry Thomas on Modern, and as Lafayette Thomas on a number of other labels.

He temporarily moved to New York City, where he worked with Sammy Price, Memphis Slim, and Little Brother Montgomery between 1958 and 1960 before returning to California.

In 1968 he recorded an album with Dave Alexander and L.C. ‘Good Rockin’’ Robinson for World Pacific Records. He remained active in the early 1970s, working with Sugar Pie DeSanto and others.

Thomas died on May 20, 1977, from a heart attack, in Brisbane, California, at the age of 48.

== Influences and reception ==
Nicknamed "The Thing" for his acrobatic playing style, Thomas was influenced by his uncle Jesse Thomas, and T-Bone Walker. Writing in Living Blues magazine in July 1977, Tom Mazzolini, director of the San Francisco Blues Festival said, "Unquestionably the finest guitarist to emerge from the San Francisco-Oakland blues scene, there is hardly a guitarist around here today who doesn't owe a little something to Lafayette Thomas".

== Discography ==
=== As leader ===
==== Singles ====
- "Baby Take A Chance With Me" / "Sam’s Drag" (Chess, 1952)
- "Don’t Have To Worry" / "Lost Mind" (Modern, 1954)
- "Weekly Blues" / "The Thing" (Trylite, 1955)
- "Cockroach Run" / "The Trial" (Jumping, 1957) B-side by 'The Jumping Judge and his Court'
- "Please Come Back To Me" / "Lafayette’s A-Coming" (Savoy, 1959)

==== Albums ====
With L. C. Robinson and Dave Alexander

- Oakland Blues (World Pacific, 1969)

=== As Sideman ===
With Little Brother Montgomery

- Tasty Blues (Bluesville, 1961)

With Memphis Slim

- Just Blues (Bluesville, 1961)
- No Strain (Bluesville, 1961)

With Jimmy McCracklin

- I Just Gotta Know (Imperial, 1963)

== See also ==
- West Coast blues
