= Philly '76 =

Live album by Frank Zappa
- Released: December 21, 2009
- Recorded: October 29, 1976
- Venue: Spectrum Theater (Philadelphia, Pennsylvania)
- Genre: Progressive rock, jazz fusion
- Length: 133:44
- Label: Vaulternative Records
- Producer: Gail Zappa & Joe Travers

Frank Zappa chronology
Lumpy Money Project/Object (2009)	Philly '76 (2009)	Greasy Love Songs (2010)

Professional ratings
Review scores
Source	Rating
Allmusic	3.5/5 stars
Prog Archives	4/5 stars

Philly '76 is a live album by Frank Zappa, recorded on October 29, 1976 at the Spectrum in Philadelphia, Pennsylvania, and released by the Zappa Family Trust on December 21, 2009 to commemorate Frank Zappa's 69th birthday. It is the fourth installment on the Vaulternative Records label that is dedicated to the posthumous release of complete Zappa concerts, following the releases of FZ:OZ (2002), Buffalo (2007) and Wazoo (2007).

== History ==
The live band featured on the recording included Bianca Odin on vocals and keyboards, who only toured with Zappa's band for a few weeks in the fall of 1976. One cut from this concert ("Wind Up Workin' in a Gas Station") was released on You Can't Do That on Stage Anymore, Vol. 6 in 1992. Prior to the release of Philly '76, no other recordings featuring Bianca Odin had been officially released.

Also appearing for the first time on the album are a performance of "Stranded in the Jungle" (originally recorded in 1956 by The Jay Hawks, later covered by The Cadets, Commander Cody and His Lost Planet Airmen and the New York Dolls, and included in the non-Zappa Family Trust release Frank Zappa's Jukebox) and a verse of lyrics in "Titties 'n Beer" not included in previously released versions of the song, which illuminates Zappa's original title for the song, "Chrissy Puked Twice".

== Critical reception ==
Critics regard Philly '76 as a unique entry in the Zappa discography, largely due to Lady Bianca. Michael Schell wrote "It's hard to overstate just how significant her presence is in mitigating the most troublesome effects of Zappa's lyrics. Simply having a woman singing the lead on a track like Dirty Love dramatically softens its impression compared to Zappa's own snide and rather sinister-sounding delivery on other albums…Black Napkins is special thanks to Bianca's wordless voice solo, distinguished by her rapid shifts from chest to head voice, and even a few multiphonics. It's the only Zappa track I can think of with this kind of prominent jazz-style solo from a female singer." Progarchives.com concluded "Bianca's gospel tinged vocals add much to songs like Dirty Love…The set is weighted toward Zappa's pop side, with the only true prog moments being The Purple Lagoon. While I wouldn't recommend this as a Zappa starting point, it is an excellent addition to a collection."

== Track listing ==
Disc one
No.	Title	Length
1.	"The Purple Lagoon"	3:35
2.	"Stink-Foot"	5:52
3.	"The Poodle Lecture"	3:48
4.	"Dirty Love"	3:36
5.	"Wind Up Workin' in a Gas Station"	2:32
6.	"Tryin' to Grow a Chin"	4:01
7.	"The Torture Never Stops"	13:31
8.	"City of Tiny Lights"	7:47
9.	"You Didn't Try to Call Me"	6:32
10.	"Manx Needs Women"	1:44
11.	"Chrissy Puked Twice"	6:48

Disc two
No.	Title	Length
1.	"Black Napkins"	18:57
2.	"Advance Romance"	13:56
3.	"Honey, Don't You Want a Man Like Me?"	4:09
4.	"Rudy Wants to Buy Yez a Drink"	2:20
5.	"Would You Go All the Way?"	2:04
6.	"Daddy, Daddy, Daddy"	2:05
7.	"What Kind of Girl Do You Think We Are?"	4:55
8.	"Dinah-Moe Humm"	8:09
9.	"Stranded in the Jungle" (James Johnson, Ernestine Smith)	3:10
10.	"Find Her Finer"	3:17
11.	"Camarillo Brillo"	4:03
12.	"Muffin Man"	6:53

== Musicians ==
- Frank Zappa – lead guitar, vocals
- Bianca Odin – vocals, keyboards
- Ray White – rhythm guitar, vocals
- Eddie Jobson – keyboards, violin
- Patrick O'Hearn – bass, vocals
- Terry Bozzio – drums, vocals
