= San Francisco Blues Festival =

American annual music festival

- San Francisco Blues Festival poster (2002)
- Genre: Blues
- Dates: Late September
- Locations: San Francisco, California, United States
- Years active: 1973 – 2008
- Founders: Tom Mazzolini
- Organizer: Tom Mazzolini

The San Francisco Blues Festival was active from 1973 until 2008, and was located in San Francisco, California. It was one of the longest running blues festival in the United States.

== History ==
In 2008, Mazzolini announced that after 37 consecutive years, the festival was forced to cease production due to economic reasons.

== Notable performers ==
=== The 1970s ===
==== 1973 ====
Jimmy McCracklin, Charlie Musselwhite, Dave Alexander, K. C. Douglas, Little Willie Littlefield, L. C. Robinson, Luther Tucker, Johnny Fuller, Gary Smith Blues Band, Mr. Boogie, The Hi Tide Harris Blues Band

==== 1974 ====
Little Joe Blue, Sugar Pie DeSanto, Mark St. Mary, Cool Papa, Robert Lowery, K. C. Douglas, L. C. Robinson, Boogie Jake, Dave Alexander

==== 1975 ====
Queen Ida, Sonny Rhodes, Floyd Dixon, Charlie Musselwhite, Charles Conley, Jimmy McCracklin, Big Roger Collins, Grace Loveberry, J.C. Burris, Dave Alexander

==== 1976 ====
Mike Bloomfield, Charles Brown, Arthur C. Robinson, Luther Tucker, Little Frankie Lee, Bernie Burns, Mike Henderson, Dottie Ivory, Hi Tide Harris, Gary Smith, Messaround Blues Allstars, Robert Lowery, Robert Kelton

==== 1977 ====
Albert Collins, Robert Cray, Phillip Walker, Sonny Rhodes, Johnny Fuller, Tom McFarland, Mississippi Charles Bevel, Chick Streetman, Johnny Waters, Boogie Jake, Willie Joe Duncan

==== 1978 ====
The Fabulous Thunderbirds, Harmonica George Smith, Louisiana Red, Lowell Fulson, Smokey Wilson, Isaac Scott, Phillip Walker, Queen Ida, Rod Piazza, Sugar Pie DeSanto, Guitar Curtis, Omar Hakim Khayam, Mark Naftalin, Ron Thompson, Mark Hummel, Charles Houff

==== 1979 ====
Stevie Ray Vaughan, Robert Cray Band, Big Mama Thornton, Jimmy Rogers, Roy Brown, Mel Brown, Paul deLay Band, Freddie Roulette, J.C. Burris, Hi Tide Harris and the Japanese Allstars, Luther Tucker, Blue Sax Allstars featuring Dr. Wild Willie Moore, Bobby Forte and Joe Conwright, Little Joe Blue, Ron Thompson Band with Mark Naftalin

=== The 1980s ===
==== 1980 ====
B.B. King, John Lee Hooker, Percy Mayfield, The Nighthawks, Pee Wee Crayton, Blind Joe Hill, The Cobras, Sooleman Rowgie, Margie Evans, J.J. Malone and Troyce Key, Buddy Ace, Little Frankie Lee, Little Charlie & the Nightcats, Mississippi Johnny Waters and the Blues Survivors, Gary Smith Blues Band, Sonny Rhodes

==== 1981 ====
Roomful of Blues, Koko Taylor, Little Milton, Earl King, Jimmy McCracklin, Carey Bell, Bob Hall, Deacon John Moore, George "Harmonica" Smith, Tom Courtney, Henry Ford Thompson, Miss Lu Lewis, Rod Piazza, Chicago Blues Power with Dallas Slim (Boz Scaggs), Eddie Ray w/Sonny Rhodes Band, Robert Kelton

==== 1982 ====
Clifton Chenier, Albert Collins, Robert Cray Band, John Hammond, Gatemouth Brown, Lloyd Glenn, Eddie Taylor, Johnny Littlejohn, Charles Ford Band, Melotones, Little Charlie & the Nightcats, Cool Papa, The Blues Survivors

==== 1983 ====
Albert King, Willie Dixon & the Chicago Blues Allstars, Clifton Chenier, Irma Thomas, Joe Liggins and the Honey Drippers, featuring Little Caesar and Diane Carlton, Brownie McGhee, Mark Hummel & The Blues Survivors, Duke Robillard, Anson Funderburgh & the Rockets, Beverly Stovall, Monica Dupont, Buddy Ace, Troyce Key Blues Band, Ron Thompson and the Resistors, Maurice McKinnies, J.C. Burris, Maxine Howard

==== 1984 ====
James Cotton, Little Milton, Dirty Dozen Brass Band, Golden Eagles, Marcia Ball, Clarence Garlow, Son Seals, Eddy Clearwater, The Nighthawks, Katie Webster, Toru Oki, Valerie Wellington, Mason Ruffner, Mighty Flyers, Bob Hall, Robert Lowery and J.C. Burris, Sonny Rhodes, Buckwheat Zydeco and The Ils Sont Partis Band

==== 1985 ====
Bonnie Raitt, Carlos Santana, Boz Scaggs, Robert Cray Band, Otis Rush, John Lee Hooker, Luther "Guitar Junior" Johnson, Katie Webster, Queen Ida, Roomful of Blues, Anson Funderburgh & the Rockets, Mitch Woods & his Rocket 88's, Ester Jones, Johnny Heartsman, Frankie Lee, Bobby Murray, Mississippi Johnnie Waters, Sam Myers

==== 1986 ====
Etta James, Albert King, Carlos Santana, Jessie Mae Hemphill, Buddy Miles, Roy Buchanan, Junior Wells & Buddy Guy, Johnny Adams, R. L. Burnside, Rockin' Dopsie, Big Daddy Kinsey & the Kinsey Report, Delbert McClinton, Joe Louis Walker & the Boss Talkers, Katie Webster, The Paladins

==== 1987 ====
Albert Collins, Joe Ely, Roomful of Blues, Buddy Guy, Lonnie Brooks Band, Jeannie & Jimmy Cheatham & the Sweet Baby Blues Band, Zachary Richard & his Zydeco Rockers, Roy Rogers & the Delta Rhythm Kings with Norton Buffalo, Lady Bianca

==== 1988 ====
Bobby "Blue" Bland, Koko Taylor, Albert Collins, Carla Thomas, John Lee Hooker, Johnny Copeland, Elvin Bishop, C.J. Chenier & His Red Hot Louisiana Band, Super Harps, featuring: Curtis Salgado, Chris Cain Band, Joe Louis Walker & the Boss Talkers, Big Daddy Kinsey & the Kinsey Report

==== 1989 ====
Ernestine Anderson, Albert King, Etta James & the Roots Band, Otis Rush, Duke Robillard & the Pleasure Kings, Terrance Simien & the Mallet Playboys, Dr. Hepcat, Saxophone Madness with Richie Cole & Big Jay McNeely, Ronnie Earl & the Broadcasters, Ron Hacker

=== The 1990s ===
==== 1990 ====
Ruth Brown, Koko Taylor & Her Blues Machine, Albert Collins & the Ice Breakers, Johnny Otis Show, Buckwheat Zydeco, Yank Rachell, Joe Louis Walker & the Boss Talkers, Katie Webster, The Paladins

==== 1991 ====
B.B. King, Etta James, Bobby McFerrin, Dirty Dozen Brass Band, Clarence 'Gatemouth' Brown, Rory Block, Snooky Pryor, John Hammond, Carey Bell & Tough Luck, Joanna Connor Band, Queen Ida & Her Zydeco Band, Alvin Youngblood Hart, Robert Cray, Boz Scaggs, Johnny Adams, Nick Gravenites

==== 1992 ====
Taj Mahal, Albert Collins, Marva Wright, Pops Staples and The Staples Singers, The Persuasions, Ann Peebles, Billy Boy Arnold, Jimmy Rogers, Mark Hummel & Blues Survivors, Kim Wilson, Antone's Women Texas Blues Revue, featuring Lou Ann Barton, Sue Foley and Angela Strehli, Nappy Brown, Chris Cain

==== 1993 ====
Robert Cray Band, Denise LaSalle, John Mayall Band, James Cotton Band, Linda Hopkins, Johnnie Johnson, Bobby Parker, Beau Jocque, Tommy Ridgley, Maria Muldaur, Rod Piazza & the Mighty Flyers, Street Sounds

==== 1994 ====
Buddy Guy, Solomon Burke, Robben Ford and the Blue Line, Kim Wilson & the Tigermen, Roomful of Blues, Asleep at the Wheel, Guitar Shorty, Charmaine Neville Band, Henry Butler, Tommy Castro Band, Charlie Musselwhite

==== 1995 ====
John Lee Hooker with Ry Cooder & Friends, Little Milton Review, Hank Ballard & The Midnighters, Sista Monica Parker, Junior Wells, Luther Allison, Joe Louis Walker & the Boss Talkers, Lavelle White, Debbie Davies, R. L. Burnside, Junior Kimbrough, Geno Delafose, Steve Freund, Soul Drivers with guest Angela Strehli, Detroit Junior

==== 1996 ====
A Tribute to Paul Butterfield, featuring Nick Gravenites, Mark Naftalin, Gary Smith and Mark Ford. Percy Sledge featuring Will Porter and the California All-Stars, John Hammond, Duke Robillard Band, Charles Brown, Tracy Nelson, Keb' Mo', Chris Cain Band, the Four Satins, Ron Thompson (blues guitarist) and the Blues Dusters Etta James and the Roots Band, Otis Rush, Magic Dick and J.Geils, Snooks Eaglin and George Porter Jr., Saffire – The Uppity Blues Women, Jimmy Thackery & the Drivers, Alvin Youngblood Hart, the Gospel Hummingbirds (These performers are listed on the 1996 event poster, but do not appear in any published reviews of the weekend: Homesick James, Harmonica Slim).

==== 1997 ====
Bobby "Blue" Bland, Ruth Brown, Joe Louis Walker, Ike Turner, Steve Cropper, Matt "Guitar" Murphy, Roomful of Blues, Coco Montoya, Charlie Musselwhite, Hubert Sumlin, John Brim, Syl Johnson Band, Sista Monica Parker, Lavay Smith and Her Red Hot Skillet Lickers, Steve Freund

==== 1998 ====
Taj Mahal, Irma Thomas, Sugar Pie DeSanto, Tracy Nelson, Marcia Ball, Mavis Staples, Huey Lewis, The Robert Cray Band, Magic Slim & the Teardrops, Roy Rogers & the Delta Rhythm Kings, Ramblin' Jack Elliott, Sonny Rhodes, Robert 'Bilbo' Walker, Barbara Dane, The Charmaine Neville Band

==== 1999 ====
John Lee Hooker & the Coast to Coast Blues Band, Deborah Coleman, Carlos Santana, Mark Hummel, Brenda Boykin & Jr Watson Revue, Dr. John, Lonnie Brooks, Jimmie Vaughan, Bobby Rush Show & Revue, Big Bill Morganfield, Pinetop Perkins & the Bob Margolin Blues Band, Rory Block, Carey Bell, Jerry Portnoy & Paul Oscher, The Kenny Neal Band, E.C. Scott

=== The 2000s ===
==== 2000 ====
Koko Taylor and Her Blues Machine, Johnny Otis Show, Barbara Morrison, Keb' Mo', Joe Louis Walker and the New Blues Allstars, Elvin Bishop, Boozoo Chavis and the Magic Sounds, Rosie Flores, Lavay Smith and Her Red Hot Skillet Lickers, Robert 'Bilbo' Walker, Super Chikan

==== 2001 ====
Los Lobos, with special guest Charlie Musselwhite, Ike Turner and the Kings of Rhythm, Little Milton with Trudy Lynn, Billy Preston & Barbara Lewis, Nappy Brown and the Playtones, Candye Kane, Maria Muldaur

==== 2002 ====
Steve Miller's Chicago Blues Reunion, featuring: Charlie Musselwhite, Elvin Bishop, Barry Goldberg, Harvey Mandel, Nick Gravenites and Marcy Levy, Otis Rush, James Cotton Blues Band, Toni Lynn Washington, Big Time Sarah, The Robert Cray Band, Robert Lockwood, Jr., Howard Tate, Otis Taylor, Steve Freund Blues Band

==== 2003 ====
Taj Mahal, Carla Thomas, Robben Ford, Al Kooper, Joe Louis Walker, Nick Gravenites, Chris Cain and the Ford Blues Band, Eddie Floyd, Tracy Nelson, Angela Strehli, Roomful of Blues, Bettye LaVette, Melvin Taylor and the Slack Band, Jackie Greene, Lazy Lester

==== 2004 ====
Carlos Santana, Buddy Guy, Keb' Mo', Charlie Musselwhite, Marcia Ball, Sugar Pie DeSanto, John Lee Hooker Jr.

==== 2005 ====
Huey Lewis and the News, Mavis Staples, James Cotton, plus Hubert Sumlin, Elvin Bishop, The Fabulous Thunderbirds, Howard Tate, Jimmy Dawkins Band, Angela Strehli, Steve Freund, Cafe R&B

==== 2006 ====
Little Richard, Ruth Brown, Irma Thomas, Kermit Ruffins, Betty Harris, Cyril Neville, Tab Benoit, Anders Osborne, Mz. Dee Rochon, Henry Butler, Sunpie Barnes and the Sunspots, Larry Taylor

==== 2007 ====
Allen Toussaint, Jimmy McCracklin, Sugar Pie DeSanto, Dave Alexander, Robert Randolph and the Family Band, John Hammond, Charlie Musselwhite Band, Joe Louis Walker, Eric Bibb, Tommy Castro Band

== See also ==
- List of blues festivals
