= J.J. Malone =

American blues musician

- Born: John Jacob Malone; August 20, 1935; Pete's Corner, Alabama, United States
- Died: February 20, 2004 (aged 68) Hawaii, United States
- Genres: West Coast blues, electric blues, soul blues
- Occupations: Guitarist, singer, keyboardist, songwriter
- Instruments: Vocals, guitar, keyboards
- Years active: Mid 1960s–2001
- Labels: Fedora, Blues Express

John Jacob (J.J.) Malone (August 20, 1935 – February 20, 2004) was an American West Coast blues, electric blues and soul blues guitarist, singer and keyboardist. His best-known recordings were "It's a Shame" and "Danger Zone". Malone was a member of the Rhythm Rockers, and he variously worked with other musicians, such as Troyce Key, Jill Baxter, Al Green, Joe Simon, Etta James, Scott McKenzie and Frankie Lee.

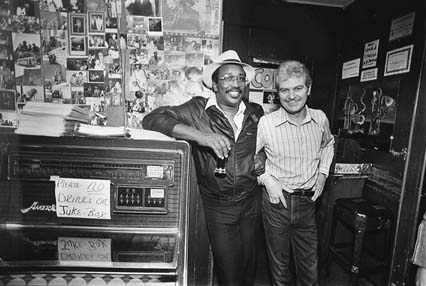
Malone and Troyce Key, Eli's Mile High Club, Oakland, California (photo by Mark Sarfati)

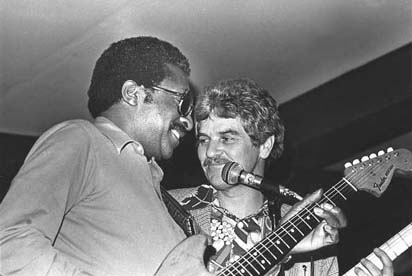
Troyce Key and Malone (photo by Mark Sarfati [osw.com])

== Biography ==
Malone was born in Pete's Corner, Alabama. His father, "Hard Rock" Charlie Malone, was an accomplished bottleneck guitarist, who played the Chitlin' Circuit from Chattanooga to Chicago in the 1930s. Malone sang in his local church and learned to play the harmonica, guitar and piano. After moving to California, he found more regular employment in the music industry and had local hit singles with "It's a Shame", "One Step Away", and "Danger Zone". Malone met the record producer Ray Shanklin and was subsequently employed as a record company executive at Fantasy Records (and its subsidiary Galaxy) in the late 1960s and early 1970s. At Galaxy, Malone worked alongside Little Johnny Taylor, Big Mama Thornton, Sonny Rhodes and Creedence Clearwater Revival. With the singer and guitarist Troyce Key, he bought Eli's Mile High Club, a nightclub in north Oakland, California. In the 1970s, Eli's Mile High acquired a reputation for supporting West Coast blues artists. In 1980s, the duo appeared at the San Francisco Blues Festival.

Malone appeared in conjunction with Key on the albums I've Gotta a New Car (1980, Red Lightnin' Records), and Younger Than Yesterday (1981, Red Lightnin'). Malone returned to performing as a solo artist in the 1980s, and continued to record until 2001. He released three solo albums, including Highway 99 (1997).

Malone died of cancer in Hawaii, in February 2004, at the age of 68. He was buried next to his father on March 2, 2004, at Ragland Cemetery in Limestone County, Alabama.

== Discography ==
1981	The Enemy called Hate	Cherry
1997	Highway 99	Fedora
1999	See Me Early in the Mornin'	Fedora
2001	And the Band Played On	Blues Express

== See also ==
- List of West Coast blues musicians
