= Johnny Fuller (musician) =

- Born: April 20, 1929; Edwards, Mississippi, United States
- Died: May 20, 1985 (aged 56) Oakland, California, United States
- Genres: West Coast blues, electric blues, rhythm and blues, gospel, rock and roll
- Occupations: Singer, guitarist
- Instruments: Vocals, guitar
- Years active: 1950s-1970s
- Label: Various

Johnny Fuller (April 20, 1929 – May 20, 1985) was an American West Coast and electric blues singer and guitarist. Fuller showed musical diversity, performing in several musical genres including rhythm and blues, gospel and rock and roll. His distinctive singing and guitar playing appeared on a number of 1950s San Francisco Bay Area recordings, although he ceased performing regularly by the late 1970s.

His best known recording, "Haunted House", was later covered with some success by Jumpin' Gene Simmons. His other better known tracks were "Crying Won't Make Me Stay", "All Night Long", "You Got Me Whistling" and "Johnny Ace's Last Letter."

== Biography ==
Fuller was born in Edwards, Mississippi. Although his origins were the Deep South, he spent most of his life in the San Francisco Bay Area. He relocated with his family to Vallejo, California, in 1945.

He later worked as an auto mechanic in a local garage from 1968 to 1983.

Fuller died of lung cancer in Oakland, California, in May 1985, at the age of 56.

== Music career ==
His musical styling was a mix of his Southern roots and West Coast upbringing. As such, he is usually classified as a West Coast bluesman, although he did not stick with one particular genre. Fuller recorded for a number of independent record labels, sometimes those associated with Bob Geddins. These included Heritage, Hollywood, Flair, Specialty, Aladdin, Imperial and Checker Records.

His debut recording was made in 1948 on the obscure Jaxyson record label, with a couple of gospel-based songs. In 1954, he began a regular recording career that lasted until 1962. While at Imperial, between 1953-62, Fuller recorded under Dave Bartholomew with the New Orleans rhythm and blues sound. Fuller produced, "Deep In My Soul", for Imperial written by Al Reed and Pearl King in 1956. He recorded twenty sides for Geddins in 1954 alone.

Fuller had local hits with the singles "All Night Long" and the original version of "Haunted House," the latter of which was written and produced by Geddins. With his ability to switch styles, Fuller performed in late-1950s rock-and-roll package tours, on the same bill as Paul Anka and Frankie Avalon. However, this same factor lost his black audience, and he was overlooked in the 1960s blues revival.

In 1974, Fuller issued his debut album, Fuller's Blues, which was well received but had little commercial success. Fuller played at the San Francisco Blues Festival in 1973 and 1977.

== Discography ==
=== Albums ===
Year	Title	Record label
1974	Fuller's Blues	Bluesmaker Records
1984	Fools Paradise (compilation)	Diving Duck

=== Singles ===
See "External links" for a full listing.

== See also ==
- List of West Coast blues musicians
