= Evejim Records =

Evejim Records was an American independent record label founded in the 1980s by Leon Haywood and based in Los Angeles, California. The label released various soul, blues, hip hop and electro recordings, as well as re-recordings of some of Leon Haywood's earlier work.

The company developed out of a record production business which Haywood had first set up in 1967, and which he named after his parents. The label became somewhat famous for recording older established blues and soul performers who had been previously inactive in recording for a period of time. These included:

- Little Joe Blue
- Buddy Ace
- Jimmy McCracklin
- Clay Hammond
- Vernon Garrett
- Ernest Lane
