= Cafe R&B =

American band

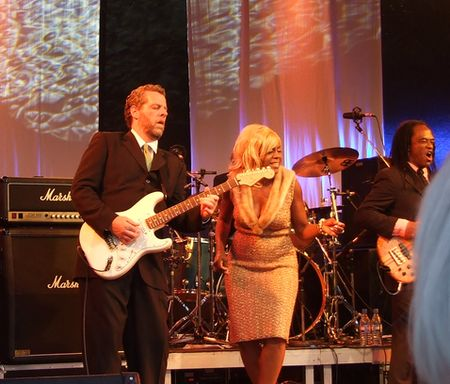

Background information
- Origin: Los Angeles, California
- Genres: Blues, soul
- Years active: 1990s–present
- Label: It Works Music
- Members: Roach; John "JT" Thomas; Steve Utstein; Bobby Pickett; Adam Gust; Don Swanson
- Past members: Ken Dooley; Chris Rhyne; Jonathan Clark; Paul Hefti; Steve Klong; Byl Carruthers
- Website: Cafe R&B

Cafe R&B is a five-piece American band from the Los Angeles area consisting of female singer Roach, guitarist Byl Carruthers, keyboardists John "JT" Thomas, Harry Cohen and Stevie Utstein, bassist Bobby Pickett, and drummers Don Swanson and Adam Gust.

Longtime music fans may remember lead singer "Roach" from her days fronting Los Angeles' "Roach and the White Boys" in the early 1980s. Critics in the U.S. and Europe have compared her hard-rocking vocals to the likes of Etta James, Tina Turner and Aretha Franklin. HITS Magazine declared: "Imagine Etta James riding a Harley out of an active volcano, and you'll have some vague inkling as to the vocal power..." Her producer/husband, Byl Carruthers, undertook guitar work and wrote the band's original material. When not producing music, he also produced and directed television shows – his credits include Oprah, Spy TV, and others.

Cafe R&B has passion for gritty, hard-hitting early blues and R&B. Cafe R&B has honed their live performance skills at venues and blues clubs throughout the U.S., such as the House of Blues and Buddy Guy's Legends, the San Francisco Blues Festival in 2005, Fire on the Mountain Blues Festival in 2005, 2006, and 2007, and the Long Beach Blues Festival, plus the Chicago Blues Festival in 2010. In Europe, they have performed at residences in London, Barcelona and Paris. In May 2010, they headlined the 19.Grolsch Blues Festival in Schoeppingen/Germany and the Jazz Festival in Cloppenburg/Germany. In October 2009, 2010 and 2012 they performed on the Legendary Rhythm & Blues Cruise. Byl Carruthers died in early May 2022.

== Selected discography ==
Year	Title	Genre	Label
1999	Black & White	Blues-rock	It Works Music
2002	Blues and all the Rest	Blues-rock	It Works Music
2005	Very Live	Blues	It Works/Redroom
