= Blue Diamond (album) =

Studio album by Sonny Rhodes
- Released: 1999
- Studio: King Snake
- Genre: Blues
- Label: Stony Plain
- Producer: Bob Greenlee

Sonny Rhodes chronology
Born to Be Blue (1997)	Blue Diamond (1999)	A Good Day to Play the Blues (2001)

Blue Diamond is an album by the American musician Sonny Rhodes, released in 1999. The album title refers to Rhodes's nickname. Blue Diamond is dedicated to Johnny Copeland. Rhodes supported the album, his first for Stony Plain Records, with a North American tour.

== Production ==
Produced by Bob Greenlee, the album was recorded at King Snake Studios, in Florida. Rhodes wrote or cowrote 10 of its songs; his writing was influenced primarily by Percy Mayfield. "Beside Myself" is an instrumental. "Too Much Trouble" is about juvenile gun violence. "Life's Rainbow" was written by Copeland. The album concludes with a 20-minute interview with Rhodes.

== Critical reception ==
Professional ratings
Review scores
Source	Rating
AllMusic	3/5 stars
Edmonton Journal	3.5/5 stars
The Gazette	8.5/10
The Penguin Guide to Blues Recordings	2.5/4 stars
The Province	3.5/5 stars
Winnipeg Sun	3.5/5 stars

The Gazette wrote that "Rhodes plays most of his leads on a lap steel guitar, an instrument much more common in country music... In his hands though, the lap steel is about as blue as B.B. King's Lucille." The Star Tribune said that "Rhodes can deliver a big, tender ballad just as well as a funky bar shuffle." The Edmonton Journal praised "the raspy, but at times tender, at times sneering, vocals of Rhodes, and his stinging and slicing lap steel guitar playing."

The Times Colonist opined that "it's the best work in the musician's long recording career, but it only hints at the power of Sonny Rhodes's live show." The Asbury Park Press listed Blue Diamond as the seventh best blues album of 1999, writing that Rhodes "showcases his masterful lyrical ideas and backs it up with blistering guitar playing and intricate lap steel treatments." The Province determined that Rhodes "knows how to put an album together but still sounds like a guy best seen live."

== Track listing ==
No.	Title	Length
1.	"Meet Me at the 10th Street Inn"
2.	"Shame on You"
3.	"Blues Is My Religion"
4.	"Blue Diamond"
5.	"Back Where You Come From"
6.	"Rainy Day"
7.	"What You're Looking For"
8.	"Beside Myself"
9.	"Too Much Trouble"
10.	"Love from a Stone"
11.	"Blues Walk"
12.	"Blues Man's Prayer"
13.	"Life's Rainbow"
14.	"Sonny Rhodes Interview"
