= Queen Ida =

American zydeco musician

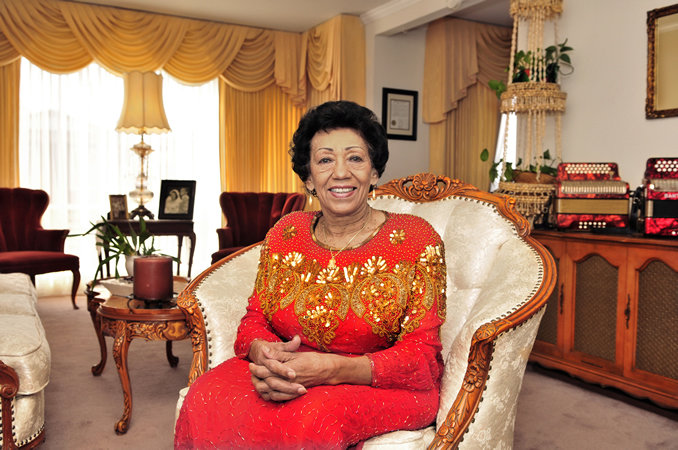
- Guillory in 2009

Background information
- Born: Ida Lee Lewis; January 15, 1929 (age 97); Lake Charles, Louisiana, U.S.
- Genres: Zydeco
- Occupations: Accordionist, record producer
- Instrument: Accordion
- Years active: 1975-2010
- Label: GNP Crescendo
- Website: Queen Ida

Ida Lewis "Queen Ida" Guillory (born January 15, 1929) is a Louisiana Creole accordionist. She was the first female accordion player to lead a zydeco band. Queen Ida's music is an eclectic mix of R&B, Caribbean, and Cajun, though the presence of her accordion always keeps it traditional.

== Biography ==
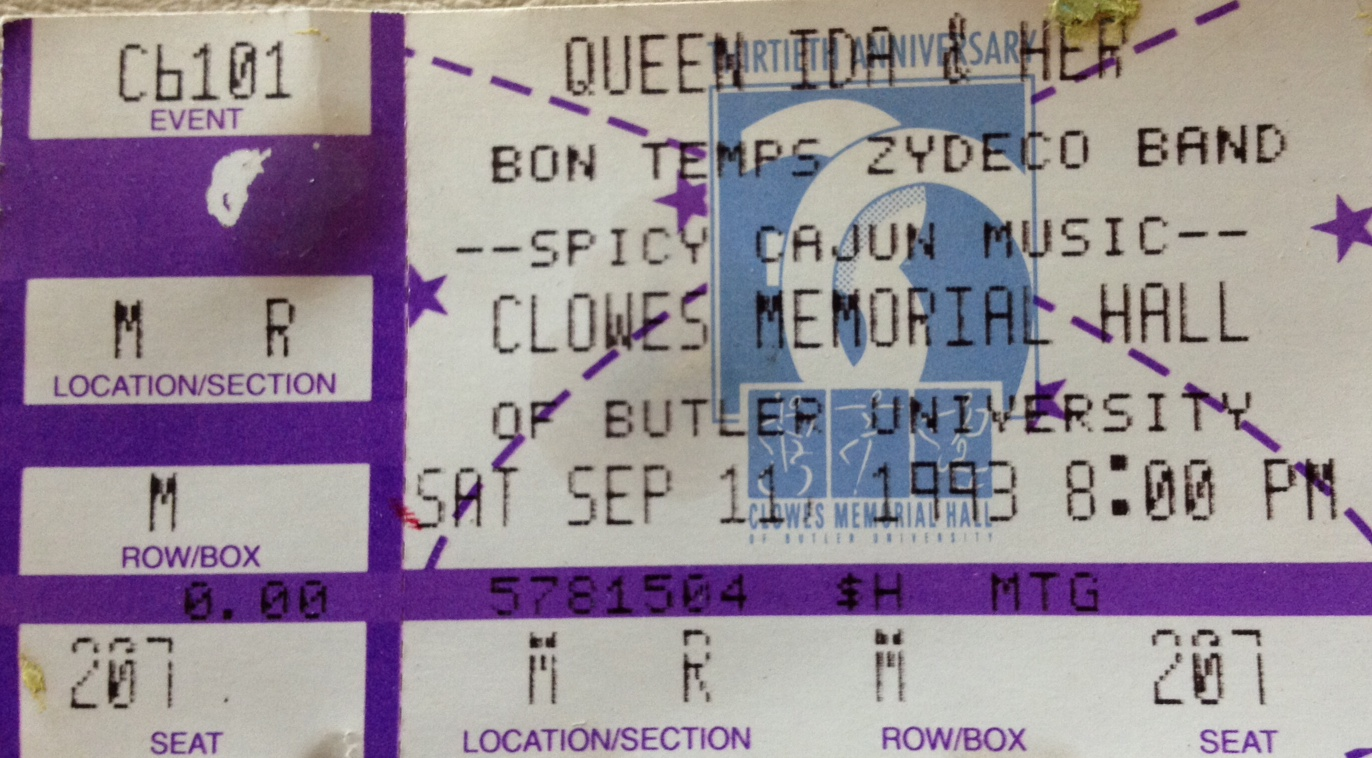
Queen Ida & her Bon Temps Zydeco Band concert ticket, 1993

Born Ida Lee Lewis to a musical family of rice farmers in Lake Charles, Louisiana, United States, her family were Louisiana Creole people and her first language is French. Her family moved to Beaumont, Texas, when she was ten and eight years later moved to San Francisco, California. Although her mother was an accordion player, women were not encouraged to play in public, and Queen Ida learned mostly from her brother Al Lewis, later known as Al Rapone. After marrying Raymond Guillory she raised their three children and worked as a bus driver but occasionally sat in with her brother's Zydeco band, also cooking Louisiana cuisine for the band members. She was dubbed "Queen Ida" after being chosen queen of a Mardi Gras celebration. A year after her first appearance on stage Queen Ida and the Bon Temps Band signed with the record label GNP/Crescendo, and her first record Play the Zydeco demonstrated her style combining Zydeco with a Tex Mex sound.

Queen Ida and her band played at the Monterey Jazz Festival in 1976 and 1988, and the San Francisco Blues Festival in 1975, 1978, and 1991. In 1988, Queen Ida toured Japan, becoming the first zydeco artist to do so. She toured Africa the following year and in 1990 went to Australia and New Zealand.

On the album Back on the Bayou (1999), Queen Ida got together on the bayou in Louisiana with her brother, Al Rapone, for a zydeco reunion. Rapone often wrote and produced for her and formed the Bon Temps Zydeco Band, which later became Queen Ida's backup group. Doubling up on accordions with her oldest son Myrick "Freeze" Guillory, they are joined by Terry Buddingh on bass, James Santiago on guitar, Bernard Anderson on saxophone, Erik Nielsen on drums, and her youngest daughter Ledra Guillory and son Ron "The Rock" Guillory on rub board and vocals. As "Queen Ida and the Bon Temps Zydeco Band," the ensemble was the musical guest on Saturday Night Live on November 23, 1985, with Paul Reubens as host.

Queen Ida also co-authored a cookbook, Cookin' with Queen Ida in 1990, which featured Creole recipes. A revised second edition of the cookbook was published in 1995.

Queen Ida continued to perform live through the 2000s, and though she did not release any albums during this period, she has joined her son Myrick and his band onstage. She officially retired from playing in 2010 and lives in the San Francisco Bay Area, where she enjoys cooking for her friends and family.

One of her accordions is among the artifacts exhibited at the National Museum of African American Music in Nashville, Tennessee, which opened in January 2021.

== Selected discography ==
Year	Title	Genre	Label
1999	Back on the Bayou (with Al Rapone)	Zydeco	GNP Crescendo - GNPD 2265
1995	On a Saturday Night	Zydeco	GNP Crescendo - GNPD 2172
1994	Mardi Gras	Zydeco	GNP Crescendo - GNPD 2227
1989	Cookin' with Queen Ida	Zydeco	GNP Crescendo - GNPD 2197
1985	Caught in the Act	Zydeco	GNP Crescendo - GNPD 2181
1983	In San Francisco	Zydeco	GNP Crescendo - GNPD 2158
1982	Queen Ida and the Bon Temps Zydeco Band on Tour	Zydeco	GNP Crescendo - GNPD 2147
1980	Queen Ida and the Bon Temps Zydeco Band in New Orleans	Zydeco	GNP Crescendo - GNPS 2131
1977	Uptown Zydeco	Zydeco	GNP Crescendo
1977	Zydeco a La Mode	Zydeco	GNP Crescendo - GNPS 2112
1976	Play the Zydeco	Zydeco	GNP Crescendo - GNPS 2101

== Awards and honors ==
She is a recipient of a 2009 National Heritage Fellowship awarded by the National Endowment for the Arts, which is the United States government's highest honor in the folk and traditional arts.

=== Grammy Awards ===
Won: 1
Nominations: 4

1980	Best Ethnic or Traditional Recording	Queen Ida and the Bon Temps Zydeco Band in New Orleans	Zydeco	Nominated
1982	Best Ethnic or Traditional Folk Recording	Queen Ida and the Bon Temps Zydeco Band on Tour	Zydeco	Won
1984	Best Ethnic or Traditional Folk Recording	On a Saturday Night	Zydeco	Nominated
1986	Best Traditional Folk Recording	Caught in the Act	Zydeco	Nominated

=== Blues Music Awards ===
Won: 2
Nominations: 4

Queen Ida Blues Music Awards History
Year	Category	Result
1983	Traditional Blues Female Artist	Nominated
1984	Traditional Blues Female Artist	Nominated
1988	Traditional Blues Female Artist	Nominated
1989	Traditional Blues Female Artist	Won
1990	Traditional Blues Female Artist	Won
1991	Traditional Blues Female Artist	Nominated
