= Freddie Brooks (musician) =

American singer-songwriter

Freddie Brooks is an American singer-songwriter and blues harmonica player. A native of Wichita, Kansas, he started performing on the Southern California blues scene in 1989. He played West Coast blues.

== Biography ==
Brooks began playing in Southern California in 1989. He played with Bernie Pearl in a few bands before releasing his first and only album, One Little Word in 1999. Brooks was a regular performer in Orange County, California.

Brooks also played with Jim Belushi.

A 2003 article in OC Weekly noted that Brooks had retired from music.

== Reception ==
Randy Lewis of The Los Angeles Times praised Brooks' 1999 album One Little Word, complimenting the range of emotions of the songs. Mike Boehm, also of the Los Angeles Times, noted Brooks' versatility on the album, and compared his backing band to Booker T. & the MGs backing Otis Redding. The OC Weekly ranked Brooks as No. 111 in the greatest Orange County bands of all time, calling One Little Word one of the best albums of the decade, citing its originality and energy.

== Discography ==
- One Little Word (1999)
