= Just Blues =

Studio album by Memphis Slim
- Released: 1961
- Recorded: November 15, 1960
- Studio: Van Gelder Studio, Englewood Cliffs, NJ
- Genre: Blues
- Length: 38:51
- Label: Bluesville

Memphis Slim chronology
Tribute to Big Bill Broonzy (1961)	Just Blues (1961)	No Strain (1961)

Just Blues is an album by the American blues pianist Memphis Slim which was recorded in 1960 and released on Bluesville, a sublabel of Prestige Records. It was reissued by Fantasy in 1972 as part of the double LP Raining the Blues, along with No Strain, another album from the same sessions.

== Reception ==
Professional ratings
Review scores
Source	Rating
AllMusic	4/5 stars

In his review for AllMusic, Stephen Cook wrote, "One of a handful of stellar albums Slim cut for Prestige's Bluesville label, the 12-track set offers a particularly pleasant way to check out the pianist's tasty keyboard work and wide-ranging topical bent."

== Track listing ==
All compositions by Peter Chatman except where noted.

1. "Beer Drinking Woman" – 3:27
2. "Teasing the Blues" (Slim-Marshall) – 3:41
3. "The I.C. Blues" – 2:52
4. "Baby Doll" – 2:08
5. "Just Blues" – 3:35
6. "Blue and Disgusted" – 2:30
7. "Blue Brew" – 4:25
8. "Rack 'Em Back Jack" – 2:30
9. "Motherless Child" – 3:04
10. "Brenda" – 3:46
11. "When Your Dought Roller Is Gone" – 2:39
12. "Hey Slim" – 4:14

== Personnel ==
- Memphis Slim – piano, vocals
- Lafayette Thomas – guitar
- Wendell Marshall – double bass
- Buster 'Harpie' Brown – harmonica
