= Crescent City Blues =

Song by Gordon Jenkins featuring Beverly Mahr

from the album Seven Dreams
- Language: English
- Released: 1953
- Recorded: 1953
- Genre: Big band, jazz, blues
- Length: 3:21
- Label: Decca
- Songwriter: Gordon Jenkins

"Crescent City Blues" is a song written by composer Gordon Jenkins and sung by Beverly Mahr, released on Jenkins' Seven Dreams album in 1953. It is a torch song about a lonely woman hoping to leave the Midwestern town of Crescent City. Its melody borrows heavily from the 1930s instrumental "Crescent City Blues" by Little Brother Montgomery. It was adapted by singer Johnny Cash as the "Folsom Prison Blues."

== History ==
Jenkins was a respected composer and arranger throughout the 1930s and 1940s. As musical director for Decca Records, Jenkins released an experimental concept album Seven Dreams consisting of seven radioplay-style musicals named for their protagonists. The album became a top-ten hit on the Billboard charts.

In Seven Dreams, the characters take a journey by train from New York to New Orleans. The "Second Dream" was called "The Conductor". In the last part of the dream, the title character steps off the train to smoke a cigarette. He hears a lonely woman in a shack sing of her troubles, in a song called "Crescent City Blues". The woman's song is sung by Beverly Mahr, Jenkins's wife.

Cash heard the song during a stint with the U.S. Air Force in Germany, and adapted it into "Folsom Prison Blues". Cash said in the 1990s, "At the time, I really had no idea I would be a professional recording artist; I wasn't trying to rip anybody off."

Nonetheless, Jenkins was not credited on the original record from Sun Records. According to Cash's manager Lou Robin, Cash acknowledged the debt to Jenkins's song, but was reassured by Sun founder Sam Phillips that he had no reason to fear a plagiarism suit. Fifteen years later, Jenkins sued for royalties. In the early 1970s, after the song became popular, Cash paid Jenkins a settlement around $75,000.

== Similarities and differences with "Folsom Prison Blues" ==
Unlike the fast-paced rock and roll style of "Folsom Prison Blues," "Crescent City Blues" is a slow, 16-bar blues torch song. The instrumentation is entirely orchestral, while the Cash song is an uptempo number with a heavy guitar riff from Luther Perkins.

Many of lyrics are exactly the same, except for the points where Cash changes the perspective of the narrator. For example, both begin, "I hear the train a comin'/It's rollin' 'round the bend." The Jenkins song follows that with "And I ain't been kissed lord/Since I don't know when," but Cash follows it with the darker "And I ain't seen the sunshine/Since I don't know when." All of the verses have this dichotomy, with an identical narrative path and stark differences in tone. Where Jenkins' narrator says "But I'm stuck in Crescent City/Just watching life mosey by," Cash has his protagonist sing the far darker "I'm stuck in Folsom Prison/Time keeps dragging on."
