= Tasty Blues =

Studio album by Little Brother Montgomery
- Released: 1961
- Recorded: July 1, 1960
- Studio: Van Gelder Studio, Englewood Cliffs, NJ
- Genre: Blues
- Length: 42:02
- Label: Bluesville; BVLP 1012

Little Brother Montgomery chronology
Little Brother (1960)	Tasty Blues (1961)	Blues (1961)

Tasty Blues is an album by blues musician Little Brother Montgomery recorded in 1960 and released on the Bluesville label early the following year.

== Reception ==
Professional ratings
Review scores
Source	Rating
AllMusic	4.5/5 stars
The Penguin Guide to Blues Recordings	4/4 stars

AllMusic reviewer Bill Dahl stated: "Here's a very attractive example of a pianist with roots dug deep in pre-war tradition updating his style just enough to sound contemporary for 1960. ... Montgomery swoops through his seminal "Vicksburg Blues" and "No Special Rider" with enthusiasm and élan". The Penguin Guide to Blues Recordings comments that Lafayette Thomas's presence on the album sets it apart from other records by Montgomery.

== Track listing ==
All compositions by Little Brother Montgomery except where noted

1. "Tasty Blues" – 4:40
2. "Santa Fe" – 2:36
3. "How Long, Brother?" – 3:36
4. "Pleading Blues" – 3:30
5. "No Special Rider Blues" – 2:22
6. "Brother's Boogie" – 2:54
7. "Sneaky Pete Blues" (Lafayette Thomas) – 4:20
8. "Something Keeps Worrying Me" – 4:02
9. "Cry Cry Baby" (Armand "Jump" Jackson) – 3:00
10. "Satellite Blues" – 3:54
11. "Deep Fried" – 3:55
12. "Vicksburg Blues" – 3:13

== Personnel ==
=== Performance ===
- Little Brother Montgomery – piano, vocals
- Lafayette Thomas – guitar (tracks 1–4 & 6–12)
- Julian Euell – bass (tracks 1–4 & 6–12)

=== Production ===
- Rudy Van Gelder – engineer
