= Troyce Key =

- Born: September 7, 1937; Jordon Plantation, Louisiana, United States
- Died: November 9, 1992 (aged 55) Oakland, California, United States
- Genres: West Coast blues, electric blues, soul blues
- Occupations: Singer, guitarist, songwriter
- Instruments: Vocals, guitar
- Years active: Late 1950s–1992

Troyce Key (September 7, 1937 – November 9, 1992) was an American West Coast blues, electric blues and soul blues singer, guitarist and songwriter, best known for his work with J.J. Malone.

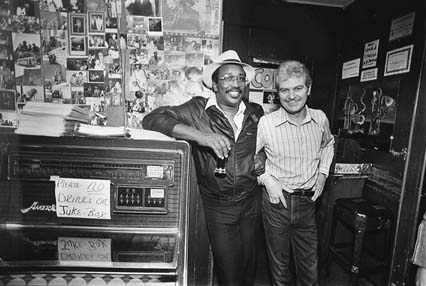
J.J. Malone and Troyce Key, Eli's Mile High Club, Oakland, CA - photo by Mark Sarfati for the East Bay Express, @1985

== Biography ==
Key was born in the Jordon Plantation, near to Monroe, Louisiana, United States, the offspring of two white sharecroppers, Verdell and Lula May Key. His father was employed by the railroad and during this period the family resided in a boxcar. In 1938, the family moved firstly to Bakersfield, California, earning a living picking either cotton or grapes. They later moved again near to Fresno, California, where Troyce was schooled. His father was musically inclined and Troyce learned to play the guitar in his early teenage years, and quickly developed an interest in the blues, after being inspired by a Lightnin' Hopkins record. After his schooling finished, he moved on his own to Mississippi hoping to learn from the local musicians from both that state and Texas. However while residing there Key contracted tuberculosis, which led to the removal of one of his lungs and several ribs. Key spent time in a santorium recovering from his ordeal and he was further influenced by Fats Domino, Johnny Otis, and Muddy Waters recordings, which the sanatorium employees played to their patients. He befriended a fellow patient, and upon discharge in 1956 from medical care, bought a guitar and the pairing tried to learn to play the songs they had heard. They progressed from local gigs to appearing on a local television program. By 1958, Key had joined a rock and roll band, the Campus Kings, and relocated to the Bay Area.

The same year, Key got a break when he was signed by Warner Bros. Records. He went on to have three single released, one in 1958 and a further two in 1959. None of them sold in any quantity and Key moved on again. In 1961, Key joined forces with J.J. Malone and they started playing together. They jointly bought Eli's Mile High Club, a nightclub in north Oakland, California. In the 1970s, Eli's Mile High acquired a reputation for supporting West Coast blues artists. In 1980s, the duo appeared at the San Francisco Blues Festival. They had some success the following year in the UK with the single, "I Gotta New Car (I Was Framed)".

Malone appeared in conjunction with Key on the albums I've Gotta a New Car (1980, Red Lightnin' Records), and Younger Than Yesterday (1982, Red Lightnin'). Malone returned to performing as a solo artist in the mid-1980s.

Key continued to own and perform at Eli's Mile High Club. He died on November 9, 1992, from leukaemia in Oakland, California, at the age of 55.

== Discography ==
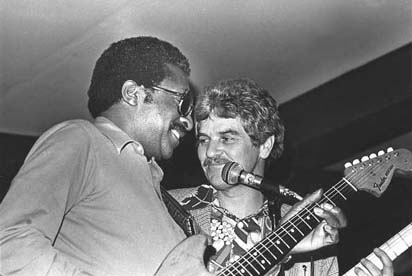
Malone and Key

=== Singles ===
Year	A-side	B-side	Record label	Billed as
1958	"Drown in My Tears"	"Baby Please Don't Go"	Warner Bros. Records	Troyce Key
1959	"Ain't I Cried Enough"	"Watch Your Mouth"	Warner Bros. Records	Troyce Key
1959	"She's Sumpin' Else"	"Most of All"	Warner Bros. Records	Troyce Key
1981	"I Gotta New Car (I Was Framed)"	"You're a Good Lookin' Woman"	Pinnacle Records	Troyce Key & J.J. Malone

=== Albums ===
Year	Title	Record label	Billed as
1980	I've Gotta New Car	Red Lightnin' Records	Troyce Key, J.J. Malone & The Rhythm Rockers
1982	Younger Than Yesterday	Red Lightnin' Records	Troyce Key, J.J. Malone & The Rhythm Rockers

== See also ==
- List of West Coast blues musicians
