= No Strain =

Studio album by Memphis Slim
- Released: 1961
- Recorded: April 26 & November 15, 1960
- Studio: Van Gelder Studio, Englewood Cliffs, NJ
- Genre: Blues
- Length: 36:34
- Label: Bluesville

Memphis Slim chronology
Just Blues (1961)	No Strain (1961)	Memphis Slim and Willie Dixon at the Village Gate (1962)

No Strain is an album by American blues pianist Memphis Slim which was recorded in 1960 and released on Bluesville, a sublabel of Prestige Records. It was reissued by Fantasy in 1972 as part of the double LP Raining the Blues, along with Just Blues, another album from the same sessions.

== Reception ==
Professional ratings
Review scores
Source	Rating
AllMusic	4/5 stars

In his review for AllMusic, Stephen Cook says "Both at the keyboard and the mic, alone or with company, Slim shows why he was one of the most urbane and original of blues giants."

== Track listing ==
All compositions by Peter Chatman except where noted.

1. "Darling, I Miss You So" – 3:11
2. "Lonesome Traveler" – 2:44
3. "No Strain" – 6:16
4. "Don't Think You're Smart" – 3:33
5. "Raining the Blues" – 3:46
6. "You're Gonna Need My Help One Day" – 3:14
7. "Angel Child" – 3:07
8. "Fast and Free" – 1:56
9. "My Baby Left Me" – 3:04
10. "Lucille" – 2:16
11. "Nice Stuff" (Chatman-Thomas) – 3:27

== Personnel ==
- Memphis Slim – piano, vocals
- Lafayette Thomas – guitar
- Wendell Marshall – double bass
- Buster 'Harpie' Brown – harmonica
