= You Can't Do That on Stage Anymore, Vol. 6 =

Live album by Frank Zappa
- Released: October 23, 1992
- Recorded: 1970–1988
- Genres: Hard rock; jazz fusion; rock and roll; experimental rock
- Length: 137:26
- Label: Rykodisc
- Producer: Frank Zappa

Frank Zappa chronology
You Can't Do That on Stage Anymore, Vol. 5 (1992)	You Can't Do That on Stage Anymore, Vol. 6 (1992)	Playground Psychotics (1992)

Professional ratings
Review scores
Source	Rating
Allmusic	4/5 stars

You Can't Do That on Stage Anymore, Vol. 6 is the last of six double-disc collection volumes of live performances by Frank Zappa recorded between 1970 and 1988. All of the material on disc one has a sexual theme. Zappa used the monologue in "Is That Guy Kidding or What?" to ridicule Peter Frampton's album I'm in You with its double entendre title and pop pretensions. Disc two includes performances from Zappa's shows between 1976 and 1981 at the Palladium in New York City, as well as material like "The Illinois Enema Bandit" and "Strictly Genteel" that he frequently used as closing songs at concerts. It was released on October 23, 1992, under the label Rykodisc.

== Track listing ==
All tracks are written by Frank Zappa.

Disc one (The Safe Sex Motif)
No.	Title	Recording venue and date	Length
1.	"The M.O.I. Anti-Smut Loyalty Oath"	Tully Gymnasium, October 9, 1970	3:01
2.	"The Poodle Lecture"	The Palladium October 30, 1977	5:02
3.	"Dirty Love"	Hammersmith Odeon, February 18, 1979	2:39
4.	"Magic Fingers"	Berkeley Community Theater, December 5, 1980	2:21
5.	"The Madison Panty-Sniffing Festival"	Dane County Coliseum, November 16, 1980	2:44
6.	"Honey, Don't You Want a Man Like Me?"	Towson Center, March 23, 1988	4:01
7.	"Father O'Blivion"	Hordern Pavilion, June 25, 1973	2:21
8.	"Is That Guy Kidding or What?"	The Palladium October 30, 1977	4:02
9.	"I'm So Cute"	Santa Monica Civic Auditorium, December 11, 1980	1:39
10.	"White Person"	Hemmerleinhalle, February 25, 1978	2:07
11.	"Lonely Person Devices"	Tivolis Koncertsal, March 3, 1976	3:13
12.	"Ms. Pinky"	Santa Monica Civic Auditorium, December 11, 1980	2:00
13.	"Shove It Right In" (comprising "She Painted Up Her Face", "Half a Dozen Provocative Squats" and "Shove It Right In")	Fillmore East, June 5–6, 1971	6:45
14.	"Wind Up Workin' in a Gas Station"	The Spectrum, October 29, 1976	2:32
15.	"Make a Sex Noise"	Broome County Arena, March 17, 1988	3:09
16.	"Tracy Is a Snob"	Salt Lake City, December 3, 1980	3:54
17.	"I Have Been in You"	The Palladium, October 29, 1978	5:04
18.	"Emperor of Ohio"	Salt Lake City, December 3, 1980	1:31
19.	"Dinah-Moe Humm"	Bismarck Theater, November 23, 1984; The Pier, August 26, 1984	3:16
20.	"He's So Gay"	The Pier, August 26, 1984	2:34
21.	"Camarillo Brillo"	Bismarck Theater, November 23, 1984	3:09
22.	"Muffin Man"	Bismarck Theater, November 23, 1984	2:25

Disc two (Halloween Concerts)
No.	Title	Recording venue and date	Length
1.	"NYC Halloween Audience"	The Palladium, October 31, 1981	0:46
2.	"The Illinois Enema Bandit"	Universal Amphitheater, December 23, 1984; Royal Oak Music Theatre, November 21, 1984; Paramount Theatre, December 17, 1984; Bismarck Theatre, November 23, 1984; Stadio Communale, July 8, 1982	8:04
3.	"Thirteen"	The Palladium, October 27–31, 1978	6:08
4.	"Lobster Girl"	The Palladium, October 29, 1978	2:20
5.	"Black Napkins"	The Palladium, December 26, 1976; Bismarck Theater, November 23, 1984 (guitar solo)	5:21
6.	"We're Turning Again"	Mannheimer Rosengarten, May 25, 1988	4:56
7.	"Alien Orifice"	The Palladium, October 31, 1981	4:16
8.	"Catholic Girls"	Tower Theater, February 12, 1988; Auditorium Theatre, March 3, 1988	4:04
9.	"Crew Slut"	Tower Theater, February 12, 1988; Auditorium Theatre, March 3, 1988	5:33
10.	"Tryin' to Grow a Chin"	The Palladium, October 31, 1977	3:33
11.	"Take Your Clothes Off When You Dance"	The Palladium, October 31, 1978	3:46
12.	"Lisa's Life Story"	Santa Monica Civic Auditorium, December 11, 1981	3:05
13.	"Lonesome Cowboy Nando"	Pauley Pavilion, August 7, 1971; Palasport, June 9, 1988	5:15
14.	"200 Motels Finale"	Pauley Pavilion, August 7, 1971	3:43
15.	"Strictly Genteel"	The Palladium, October 31, 1981	7:07

== Personnel ==
- Frank Zappa – conductor, main performer, guitar, vocals, synthesizer, producer
- Mark Volman – vocals
- Howard Kaylan – vocals
- Lisa Popeil – vocals
- Denny Walley – slide guitar, vocals
- Ike Willis – guitar, vocals
- Adrian Belew – guitar, vocals (tracks 2, 8, 10, 32)
- Ray White – guitar, vocals
- Warren Cuccurullo – guitar
- Steve Vai – guitar
- Mike Keneally – guitar, synthesizer, vocals
- Bobby Martin – keyboards, vocals
- Bob Harris – keyboards, vocals
- Peter Wolf – keyboards
- Allan Zavod – keyboards
- George Duke – keyboards
- Tommy Mars – keyboards
- Ian Underwood – keyboards, alto saxophone
- Lady Bianca – keyboards, vocals on "Wind up Workin' in a Gas Station"
- Patrick O'Hearn – bass guitar
- Jeff Simmons – bass guitar
- Arthur Barrow – bass guitar
- Scott Thunes – bass guitar
- Tom Fowler – bass guitar
- Ralph Humphrey – drums
- Vinnie Colaiuta – drums
- Aynsley Dunbar – drums
- Terry Bozzio – drums
- Chad Wackerman – drums, electronic percussion
- Ed Mann – electric percussion, percussion, backing vocals, marimba
- Paul Carman – soprano saxophone, alto saxophone, baritone saxophone
- Napoleon Murphy Brock – saxophone, vocals
- Albert Wing – tenor saxophone
- Michael Brecker – tenor saxophone on "Black Napkins"
- Kurt McGettrick – baritone saxophone, contrabass clarinet, bass saxophone
- Walt Fowler – flugelhorn, synthesizer, trumpet
- L. Shankar – violin
- Jean-Luc Ponty – violin
- George Douglas – engineer
- Bob Stone – engineer
