= Clay Hammond =

American R&B and soul singer and songwriter (1936–2011)

- Born: Clayton Hammond Jr. June 21, 1936; Groesbeck, Texas, United States
- Died: February 4, 2011 (aged 74) Houston, Texas, United States
- Genres: R&B, soul
- Occupations: Singer, songwriter
- Instrument: Vocals
- Years active: 1956–2011
- Labels: Tag, Galaxy, Duo-Disc, Liberty, Keyman, Kent, Ronn, Mercury, Raushan, Versepto, Evejim, Hit Parade, White Ent.

Clay Hammond Jr. (21 June 1936 – 4 February 2011) was an American R&B and soul singer and songwriter. As well as recording in his own right, he is most notable for writing "Part Time Love", a no. 1 R&B chart hit in 1963 for Little Johnny Taylor.

== Life and career ==
Clayton Hammond Jr. was born in Groesbeck, Texas. In 1956 he became a founding member of the gospel group The Mighty Clouds of Joy in Los Angeles, with Little Johnny Taylor and others. His younger brother, Walter Hammond, became a member of vocal group The Olympics. Clay Hammond made his first recording in 1959 for the Tag label, and then formed a trio, The Three Friends, who recorded for the Cal-Gold and Imperial labels in 1961, with little success. He also recorded with his brother Walter as the Hammond Brothers.

In 1963, his song "Part Time Love", recorded by Little Johnny Taylor, reached the top of the Billboard R&B chart and no.19 on the pop chart. He continued to write songs, but with much less success, as well as recording singles for a variety of small labels. He joined Kent Records in 1966, and his four singles for that label, including "I'll Make It Up To You", are among his most well-known; Richie Unterberger wrote that they "mixed Southern soul, gospel, and blues styles, yet also had a somewhat lighter and poppier production aura than much Southern soul, perhaps because they were recorded in Los Angeles." After leaving Kent in 1969 Hammond issued further singles, but in 1981 joined doo-wop group The Rivingtons as their lead vocalist, replacing Carl White. He also spent some time in a version of The Drifters.

He continued to record as a solo singer for various small labels up to the mid-1990s, and released several albums including Come Into These Arms Of Love (P-Vine, 1981), Streets Will Love You (Evejim, 1983), and Hard To Explain (White Ent., 1993). His recordings for the Kent label were reissued on CD. In 2000 he appeared at the Blues Estafette festival in the Netherlands, and in 2001 and 2010 he performed at the Sweet Soul Festival in Porretta, Italy.

He died in Houston, Texas in 2011 at the age of 74.
