= Robert Lowery (musician) =

American blues singer and guitarist

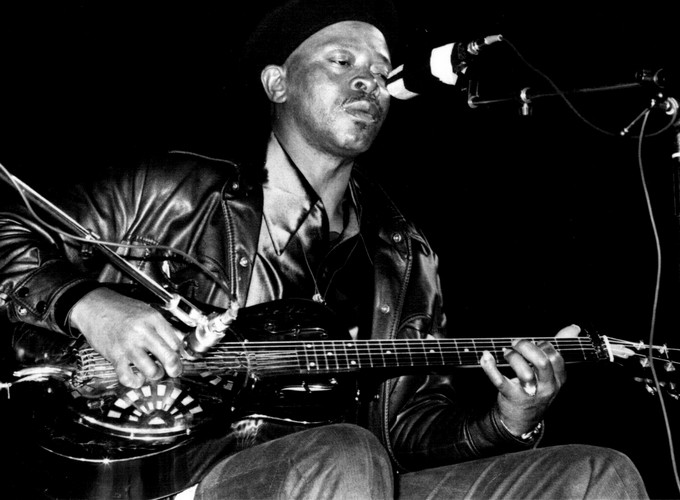
- Robert Lowery in 1980

Background information
- Born: April 8, 1931
- Origin: Shula, Arkansas, United States
- Died: October 25, 2016 (aged 85)
- Genres: Delta blues, country blues
- Occupation(s): Singer, guitarist
- Instrument: Guitar
- Years active: 1950s–2016

Robert Lee Lowery (April 8, 1931 – October 25, 2016) was an American blues singer and guitarist.

== Biography ==
As a teenager, he picked up blues tunes from records by Robert Johnson, Lightnin' Hopkins, Blind Boy Fuller, Arthur "Big Boy" Crudup, and others, eventually developing his own distinctive style. After moving to Santa Cruz, California in 1957, he backed up Big Mama Thornton.

Lowery made his first major concert appearance in 1974, at the San Francisco Blues Festival, and appeared there again in 1976 and 1984. Since then, he has traveled worldwide, and performed at many blues festivals and concerts, including a special appearance of fellow Arkansas native President Bill Clinton's 1993 inauguration. Lowery has released many recordings on diverse record labels, some of which are currently available.

More recently, Lowery's reputation as an authentic Delta blues musician has taken him far beyond California. He played the Monterey Jazz Festival in 2006, New Orleans Jazz and Heritage Festival in 2007, Philadelphia Blues Festival, Eureka Springs Festival in Arkansas, the San Remo Blues Festival in Italy and the North Sea Jazz Festival in the Netherlands. He recorded a television commercial for MCI Inc., singing about how his telephone bill was too high.

== Selected discography ==
=== Singles ===
- "Way Down Behind The Sun" / "Lowery Boogie", Delta Blues, Blues Connoisseur 1013

=== Albums ===
Year	Title	Style	Record label
1994	Earthquake Blues	Delta Blues, Country blues	Orleans
1995	A Good Man Is Hard to Find	Delta Blues, Country blues	Orleans
1999	Goin' Away Blues	Delta Blues, Country blues	Wolf Records
2000	Rainin' Down Blues	Delta Blues, Country blues	Wolf Records
2000	Playing out in the Street	Delta Blues, Country blues	The Orchard
2001	Playing out in the Street (re-release)	Delta Blues, Country blues	Freepott Records
