= Little Brother Montgomery =

American jazz, boogie-woogie and blues pianist and singer (1906–1985)

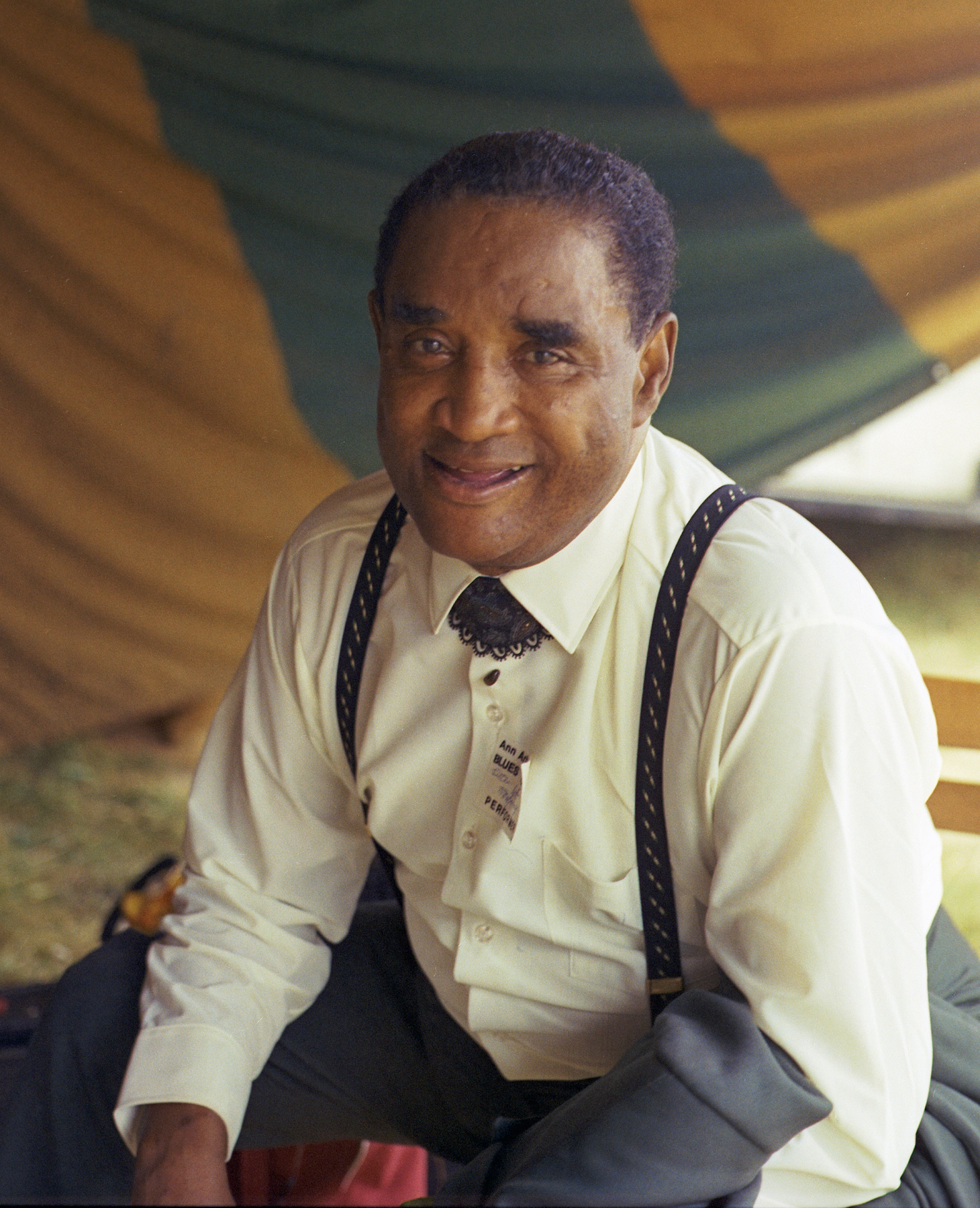
- Little Brother Montgomery at the 1970 Ann Arbor Blues Festival.

Background information
- Born: Eurreal Wilford Montgomery; April 18, 1906; Kentwood, Louisiana, United States
- Died: September 6, 1985 (aged 79) Chicago, Illinois, U.S.
- Genres: Jazz; blues; boogie-woogie
- Occupations: Pianist; vocalist
- Instruments: Vocals; piano
- Label: Earwig Music

Eurreal Wilford "Little Brother" Montgomery (April 18, 1906 – September 6, 1985) was an American jazz, boogie-woogie and blues pianist and singer.

Largely self-taught, Montgomery was an important blues pianist with an original style. He was also versatile, working in jazz bands, including larger ensembles that used written arrangements. He did not read music but learned band routines by ear.

== Career ==
Montgomery was born in Kentwood, Louisiana, United States, a sawmill town near the Mississippi border, across Lake Pontchartrain from New Orleans, where he spent much of his childhood. Both his parents were of African-American and Creek Indian ancestry. As a child he looked like his father, Harper Montgomery, and was called Little Brother Harper. The name evolved into Little Brother Montgomery, and the nickname stuck. He started playing piano at the age of four, and by age 11 he left home for four years and played at barrelhouses (Juke Joints) in Louisiana. His main musical influence was Jelly Roll Morton, who used to visit the Montgomery household.

Early in his career he performed at African-American lumber and turpentine camps in Louisiana, Arkansas, and Mississippi. He then played with the bands of Clarence Desdunes and Buddy Petit. He lived in Chicago from 1928 to 1931, regularly playing at rent parties, and Chicago was where he made his first recordings. From 1931 through 1938, he led a jazz ensemble, the Southland Troubadours, in Jackson, Mississippi.

In 1941, Montgomery moved back to Chicago, which would be his home for the rest of his life, and went on tours to other cities in the United States and Europe. He toured briefly with Otis Rush in 1956. In the late 1950s he was discovered by a wider white audience. His fame grew in the 1960s, and he continued to make many recordings, some of them on his own record label, FM Records, which he formed in 1969 (FM stood for Floberg Montgomery, Floberg being the maiden name of his wife).

Montgomery toured Europe several times in the 1960s and recorded some of his albums there. He appeared at many blues and folk festivals during the following decade and was considered a living legend, a link to the early days of blues in New Orleans.

Among his original compositions are "Shreveport Farewell", "Farrish Street Jive", and "Vicksburg Blues". His instrumental "Crescent City Blues" served as the basis for a song of the same name by Gordon Jenkins, which in turn was adapted by Johnny Cash as "Folsom Prison Blues."

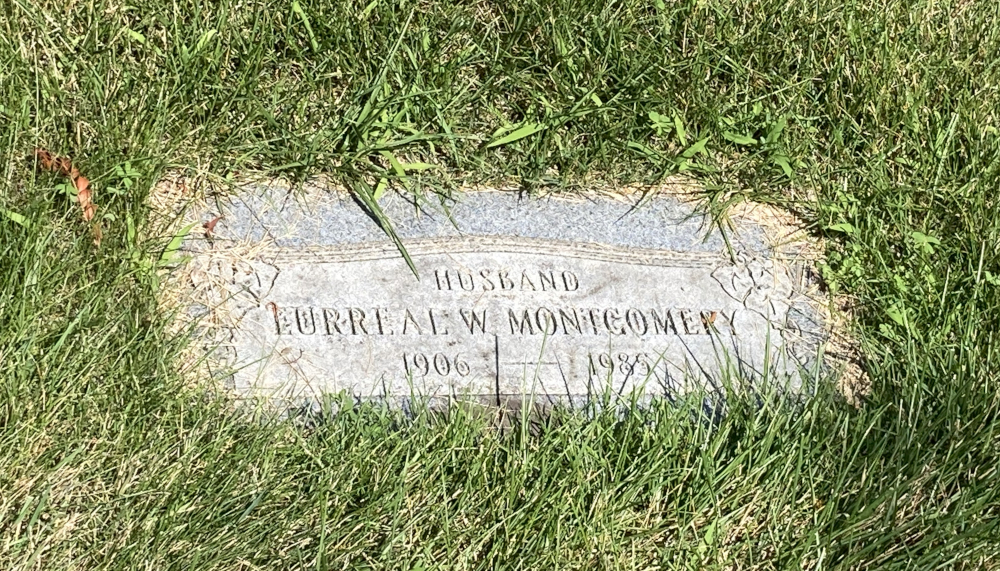
Montgomery's grave at Oak Woods Cemetery

In 1968, Montgomery contributed to two albums by Spanky and Our Gang, Like to Get to Know You and Anything You Choose b/w Without Rhyme or Reason.

Montgomery died on September 6, 1985, in Champaign, Illinois, and was interred in the Oak Woods Cemetery.

In 2013, Montgomery was posthumously inducted into the Blues Hall of Fame.

The R&B musician and producer Paul Gayten was Montgomery's nephew.

== Discography ==
Year of release	Album title	Label
1960	Tasty Blues	Bluesville
1961	Blues	Folkways
1962	Chicago: The Living Legends: Little Brother Montgomery	Riverside
1965	Music Down Home: An Introduction to Negro Folk Music: U.S.A.	Folkways
1966	Piano Blues	Folkways
1968	Farro Street Live	Folkways
1968	No Special Rider Here	Genes/Adelphi
1972	Blues Piano Orgy	Delmark
1975	Church Songs: Sung and Played on the Piano by Little Brother Montgomery	Folkways
2003	Classic Blues from Smithsonian Folkways	Smithsonian Folkways
2003	Classic Blues from Smithsonian Folkways, Vol. 2	Smithsonian Folkways
2008	Classic Piano Blues from Smithsonian Folkways	Smithsonian Folkways
2008	Classic African American Gospel from Smithsonian Folkways	Smithsonian Folkways

== See also ==
- Adelphi Records
- List of blues musicians
- List of Chicago blues musicians
- List of people from Louisiana
- 77 Records
