= Lady Bianca =

American singer and songwriter (born 1953)

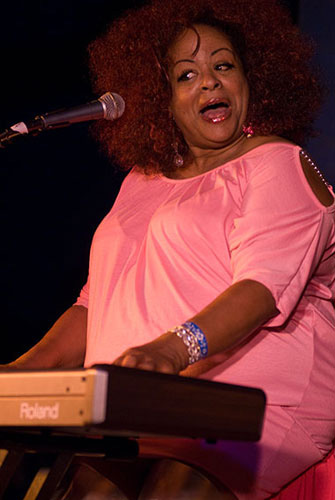
- Lady Bianca performing at the 2008 Monterey Blues Festival.

Background information
- Born: Bianca Thornton; August 8, 1953 (age 73); Kansas City, Missouri, United States
- Genre: Electric blues
- Occupations: Singer, songwriter, actress, arranger
- Instruments: Vocals, keyboards
- Years active: 1970–present
- Labels: Telarc, Rooster Blues, Magic-O
- Website: www.ladybianca.com

Lady Bianca (born August 8, 1953) is an American electric blues singer, songwriter, actress, and arranger. Lady Bianca has worked as a session singer, depicted Billie Holiday on stage, and since 1995 released six solo albums, three of which were nominated for a Grammy Award.

She is currently based in Oakland, California.

== Life and career ==
Lady Bianca was born Bianca Thornton, in Kansas City, Missouri, United States. She was the eldest child, with two sisters and one brother.

Her first exposure to music was through gospel, and she studied at the San Francisco Conservatory of Music. Her first professional gig was with Quinn Harris and the Masterminds, when she was aged 17. Harris dubbed her 'Lady Bianca', and the combination contributed two tracks to a compilation album released by Reynolds Records in 1970.

In 1972, she played the role of Billie Holiday in the San Francisco stage production of Jon Hendricks' Evolution of the Blues. In the mid 1970s, she worked in various clubs in the San Francisco Bay Area, where she met bass guitarist Henry Oden. They were subsequently married for 15 years. She then joined Sly and the Family Stone as backing vocalist and keyboard player, and appeared on their 1976 album, Heard Ya Missed Me, Well I'm Back.

Starting in October 1976, she toured with Frank Zappa in the United States and Canada. A recording of her singing "Wind Up Workin' in a Gas Station" appeared in 1992 on You Can't Do That on Stage Anymore, Vol. 6. The complete concert of 29 October 1976 in The Spectrum, Philadelphia (with Lady Bianca singing on several tracks) was published on two CDs by the Zappa Family Trust in 2009, entitled Philly '76, on which she is credited as Bianca Odin. The release included the previously released version of "Wind Up Workin' in a Gas Station," as well as "Dirty Love" and "You Didn't Try To Call Me." She is also heard employing the technique of multi-phonics with her voice on a wordless solo in "Black Napkins." After November 11, she left the band because of conflicts with Zappa.

When not touring, she performed locally in the recording studio, backing musicians such as Lee Oskar, Merle Haggard and Taj Mahal. In 1977, she co-founded the short-lived ensemble Vitamin E, and they released the commercially doomed Sharing album on Buddah Records. Lady Bianca then joined another group, Zingara, which was set up by Lamont Dozier in 1980. The trio included James Ingram, Wali Ali and Lady Bianca, but again, it did not have any lasting appeal. In 1979 and 1982, she voiced Sally Sashay, and Dolli Dimples for Pizza Time Theatre.

Between 1981 and 1986, Lady Bianca toured with and recorded backing vocals for Van Morrison, appearing on recordings such as Beautiful Vision (1982), Inarticulate Speech of the Heart (1983), Live at the Grand Opera House Belfast (1984), A Sense of Wonder (1985), and No Guru, No Method, No Teacher (1986). Lady Bianca also worked with John Lee Hooker and Willie Dixon. In 1984, she met Stanley Lippitt, a songwriter and her eventual husband. She continued to perform locally and undertook more low-key recording work.

After recording demos with Lippitt, she was noticed by Joe Louis Walker who helped arrange a recording contract. Her debut solo album, Best Kept Secret was released in 1995 on Telarc Distribution. Her backing vocals work continued in the 1990s, when she worked with Frankie Lee and Maria Muldaur. Lady Bianca's next solo effort was the critically acclaimed Rollin' (2001), which was released on the Rooster Blues label. In 2002, she was given the 'Keys to the City' in Oakland.

She formed her own record label, Magic-O Records, and with Lippitt have their own production and publishing company. Further albums were recorded and issued on Magic-O. These included All by Myself (2004), Let Love Have Its Way (2005), Through a Woman's Eyes (2007), and A Woman Never Forgets (2009).

In April 2007, at the Bay Area Black Music Awards, Lady Bianca was awarded as Best Blues Performer. In March 2008, she was voted into the West Coast Blues Society Hall of Fame. In 2009, she appeared with Van Morrison at the Royal Albert Hall in London.

Lady Bianca and the Magic-O Rhythm Band have appeared at many blues music festivals, including the San Francisco Blues Festival in 1987, the Sarasota Blues Fest in 1996., and the Monterey Bay Blues Festival in 2008.

Three of her albums have been nominated for a Grammy Award: Best Kept Secret, Rollin', and Through a Woman's Eyes.

== Discography ==
Year	Title	Record label
1995	Best Kept Secret	Telarc Distribution
2001	Rollin'	Rooster Blues
2004	All by Myself	Magic-O
2005	Let Love Have Its Way	Magic-O
2007	Through a Woman's Eyes	Magic-O
2009	A Woman Never Forgets	Magic-O
2012	Servin Notice	Magic-O
2014	Real People Music	Magic-O

== See also ==
- List of electric blues musicians
