= Little Joe Blue =

American singer and guitarist

- Born: Joseph Valery, Jr. September 23, 1934; Vicksburg, Mississippi, United States
- Died: April 22, 1990 (aged 55) Reno, Nevada, United States
- Genre: Electric blues
- Occupations: Guitarist, singer
- Instruments: Guitar, vocals
- Years active: Late 1950s–1990
- Labels: Kent, Jewel, Checker, Evejim and others

Little Joe Blue (September 23, 1934 – April 22, 1990) was an American electric blues singer and guitarist. His musical style was often compared to B. B. King.

His most notable track was "Dirty Work Going On", which was written by Ferdinand "Fats" Washington, and originally recorded by Little Joe Blue in 1966. It was released by Checker Records. The track peaked at No. 40 in the US Billboard R&B chart.

== Career ==
He was born Joseph Valery, Jr. in Vicksburg, Mississippi, United States. He was brought up in Tallulah, Louisiana, before he relocated in 1951 to Detroit, Michigan, to work in the automobile plants. He also spent over two years in Korea, having been drafted in the United States Army in 1954.

Returning to Detroit, he formed the band the Midnighters in the late 1950s. He moved to Los Angeles, California, where he cut some records for Kent, Jewel and Checker Records in the 1960s. His 1966 song, "Dirty Work Going On" (US Billboard R&B, No. 40), was covered by Magic Sam, and Shakey Jake Harris, and by Willie Kent & His Gents.

In 1975, he travelled to Europe to take part in the American Blues Legends tour and album recording, organised by the UK-based Big Bear Records.

Little Joe Blue recorded for various labels, including Evejim Records, throughout the 1980s. He played at the San Francisco Blues Festival in 1974, travelled to Europe in 1982, and appeared at the Chicago Blues Festival in 1986.

Little Joe Blue's Greatest Hits (1996), a two-album set available on CD via Evejim, included (among others) the tracks "Dirty Work Going On", "Encourage Me Baby", "Don't Start Me to Talkin'" and Little Milton's "How Could You Do It to Me".

He died in Reno, Nevada, United States, in April 1990 at the age of 55, from stomach cancer. He had two children: one son and one daughter.

== Discography ==
=== Studio albums ===
- Southern Country Boy (Jewel, 1972; Paula, 1997 [CD])
- Happy Here – Earthy Blues (Space, 1973)
- Blue & The Blues Are Back (Kris, 1978)
- Don't Tax Me In (Flyright Records, 1978)
- Just Like B. (Jewel, 1980)
- Best Of The Blues (Kris, 1981)
- It's My Turn Now (Empire Enterprise, 1984) - with Smokin' Joe Kubek
- Dirty Work Goin' On (Blues Reference) (Black & Blue, 1986 [1993]; 2005 [CD]) - with Melvin Taylor and Billy Branch
- Dirty Work Going On (Evejim, 1987)
- I'm Doing All Right Again (Evejim, 1989)

=== Collaborative albums ===
- American Blues Legends '75 (Big Bear, 1975)
- Chicago Blues Festival '86 (Black & Blue, 1993) - with Eddie Burns

=== Compilation albums ===
- Blue's Blues (Charly, 1987) - Jewel material
- Little Joe Blue's Greatest Hits (Evejim, 1996)
- The Very Best of Little Joe Blue (Collectables, 2006) - Space and Kris material
- The Very Best of Little Joe Blue, Expanded Edition (Fuel 2000, 2012) - Jewel material

== See also ==
- List of blues musicians
- List of electric blues musicians
