= Robert Kelton =

American musician (1908–1996)

Robert Kelton Jr. (January 1, 1908 – May 19, 1996) was an American blues guitarist and banjo player, influential in the development of jump blues and early rock and roll.

== Early life ==
Kelton was born in Kansas City, Kansas, and learned to play ukulele as a child, playing in cabarets in Turner by the mid-1920s. After becoming proficient on the banjo, he moved to Chicago in 1926 and the following year to St. Louis, Missouri, where he worked with Dewey Jackson's band on river boats. He next moved to Denver, Colorado, and then Phoenix, Arizona, where he married and played in George Morrison's band, before relocating to Los Angeles in 1932, and taking up the guitar.

== Career ==
Around 1935, he became one of the first to play electric guitar, in Boot Wiley's band at Riverside, California, where he influenced Charlie Christian. Over the next few years Kelton also played with Jack McVea, before playing in Happy Johnson's band in San Diego between 1939 and 1942. In 1943, he met Jimmy McCracklin, but then entered military service in the US Navy. In 1946 Kelton, McCracklin, and drummer Little Red formed the Blues Blasters, recording for the Cava-tone and Down Town labels with Kelton providing solos that "were highly unusual and most effective", on tracks such as "Blues Blasters Shuffle" (1948). He continued to perform with McCracklin over the following decade, leaving soon after Lafayette Thomas joined. Kelton also worked as a session musician, and recorded some tracks under his own name for Aladdin Records.

== Last days ==
He performed and recorded intermittently in the 1960s and 1970s, while also working in the post office in Richmond, California, and also wrote songs, some of which he sold to Don Robey. He recorded a single on the Rhodes-Way label in 1979, but his final recording session in 1981 was never completed. He died at home in Richmond in 1996, aged 88.
