= Sonny Rhodes =

American musician (1940–2021)

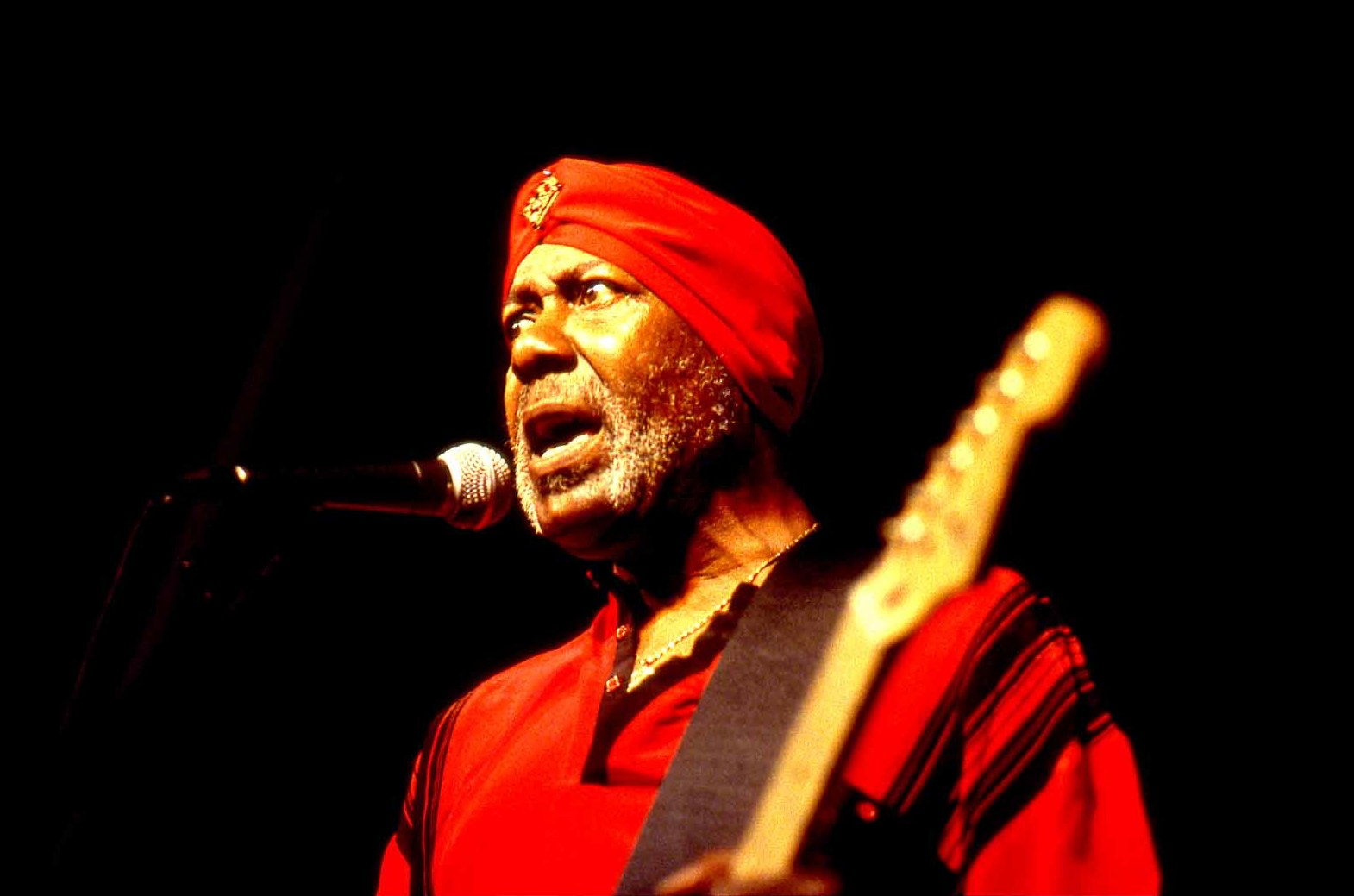
- Rhodes performing in 2000

Background information
- Also known as: Clarence Smith
- Born: Clarence Edward Mauldin; November 3, 1940; Smithville, Texas, U.S.
- Died: December 14, 2021 (aged 81)
- Genres: Blues
- Occupations: Singer, guitarist, songwriter
- Instruments: Lap steel guitar, electric guitar
- Years active: 1958–2021
- Labels: Evidence, Galaxy, Ichiban, Kingsnake, Rhodes-Way, Stony Plain, Greater Planet Entertainment, Need To Know Music

Clarence Smith (born Clarence Edward Mauldin; November 3, 1940 – December 14, 2021), known as Sonny Rhodes, was an American blues singer and lap steel guitar player. He recorded over two hundred songs. "I'm what you call a self-proclaimed Disciple of the Blues!" said Rhodes about his years playing and singing for fans of blues around the world. He was nominated 15 times for Blues Music Awards and won in the category 'Instrumentalist – Other' in 2011.

== Life and career ==
Rhodes was born in Smithville, Texas on November 3, 1940, as the son of Emma Mauldin. He was orphaned as a baby and was adopted by sharecroppers Leroy and Julia Smith. He received his first guitar at the age of eight as a Christmas present and became serious about playing the blues at age 12. He credited his uncle as his source of inspiration. Rhodes began performing around Smithville and nearby Austin in the late 1950s, while still in his teens. He listened a lot to T-Bone Walker when he was young. He acknowledged as influences the guitarists L.C. Robinson, Pee Wee Crayton and B.B. King and the singer Percy Mayfield. With his first band, Clarence Smith and the Daylighters, he played blues clubs in the Austin area until he joined the U.S. Navy after high school graduation.

In the Navy, he was stationed in California, where he worked for a while as a radio man and closed-circuit Navy ship disc jockey, telling off-color jokes in between the country and blues records he would spin for the entertainment of the sailors. Rhodes recorded a single, "I'll Never Let You Go When Something Is Wrong", for Domino Records in Austin in 1958. He also learned to play the bass guitar. He played bass accompanying the guitarists Freddie King and Albert Collins. After his stint in the Navy, in his mid-20s, Rhodes returned to California and lived in Fresno for a few years before signing a recording contract with Galaxy Records in Oakland. He recorded a single, "I Don't Love You No More", in 1966 and another single for Galaxy in 1967, changing his stage name from Clarence Smith to Sonny Rhodes at that time. Frustrated with the San Francisco Bay area record companies, he recorded "Cigarette Blues" on his own label, Rhodes-Way Records, in 1978.

Rhodes toured Europe in 1976 and released numerous recordings on European labels, including I Don't Want My Blues Colored Bright and the live album In Europe. In 1985, he released Just Blues on Rhodes-Way. In the late 1980s, he recorded Disciple of the Blues, released by Ichiban Records in 1991, and Living Too Close to the Edge, released in 1992. He later moved to Kingsnake Records, releasing several albums including The Blues Is My Best Friend (1994) and Out of Control (1995), and touring widely in the US, Canada and Europe. In 2008, he released I'm Back Again. His current release, The Essential Sonny Rhodes – Songs & Stories, on Need To Know Music is a retrospective of his career to date, featuring Rich Kirch, Barry Goldberg, Frank Howard Swart and Dawn Richardson. The record was produced by Brian Brinkerhoff and Swart.

He died on December 14, 2021, at the age of 81.

== Other work ==
=== Television ===
Rhodes recorded "The Ballad of Serenity", the theme music for the television series Firefly, which was written by series creator Joss Whedon.

=== Festivals ===
Rhodes played at the San Francisco Blues Festival six times. In 1993, Sonny was the best man in the onstage wedding of Mike and Laura Harrelson at the Sacramento Blues Festival. He also played at the Musicamdo Jazz and Blues Festival in Italy in 2005 and the Fresno Blues Festival in 2007.

== Selected discography ==
1977	I Don't Want My Blues Colored Bright	Texas blues	Blossom Studios
1991	Disciple Of The Blues	Texas blues	Ichiban Records
1992	Won't Rain in California	Contemporary blues	EPM Musique
1992	Livin' Too Close To The Edge	Texas blues	Ichiban Records
1995	Just Blues	Contemporary blues	Evidence
1994	The Blues Is My Best Friend	Texas blues	Kingsnake
1996	Out of Control	Delta blues	Kingsnake
1997	Born to Be Blue	Delta blues	Kingsnake
1999	Blue Diamond	Blues	Stony Plain Music
2001	A Good Day to Play the Blues	Traditional blues	Stony Plain Music
2003	Texas Fender Bender (Live)	Texas blues	Great Planet Entertainment
2008	I'm Back Again	Delta blues	EPM Musique
2016	Then & Now	Texas blues	Blues Express Records
2017	The Essential Sonny Rhodes – Songs & Stories	Traditional blues	Need To Know Music
