= Dave Alexander (blues musician) =

American Texas blues singer and pianist (1938–2012)

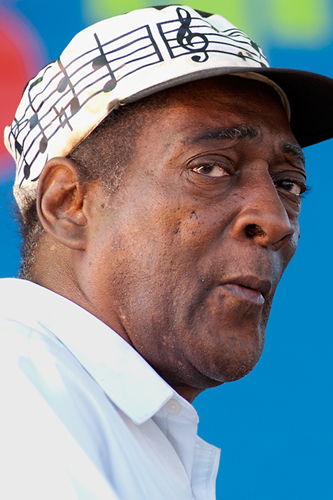
- Alexander performing at the 2007 San Francisco Blues Festival

Background information
- Also known as: Omar Sharriff; Omar Hakim Khayam; Omar the Magnificent
- Born: David Alexander Elam; March 10, 1938; Shreveport, Louisiana, United States
- Died: January 8, 2012 (aged 73) Marshall, Texas, United States
- Genres: Texas blues, jazz
- Occupations: Singer, pianist
- Instrument: Piano
- Years active: 1960s–2012
- Labels: Arhoolie, Have Mercy Records
- Website: Omar Shariff and Friends

Dave Alexander (born David Alexander Elam), also known as Omar Sharriff, Omar Shariff, Omar Hakim Khayam (March 10, 1938 – January 8, 2012), was an American West Coast blues singer and pianist.

== Biography ==
Alexander was born in Shreveport, Louisiana, in 1938, and grew up in Marshall, Texas. His father was a pianist, and his mother encouraged him to play in church. Alexander joined the United States Navy in 1955. He moved to Oakland, California, in 1957, and began a long history of working with various San Francisco Bay area musicians. A self-taught pianist, he played with Big Mama Thornton, Jimmy Witherspoon, Muddy Waters, Buddy Guy and Albert Collins. In 1968, he recorded his first songs for the compilation album Oakland Blues, released by World Pacific Records. He performed at the Ann Arbor Blues and Jazz Festival in 1970 and at the San Francisco Blues Festival many times from 1973 onward. He was the warm-up act at the Last Waltz, a concert staged by the Band at the Winterland Ballroom, on Thanksgiving Day, November 25, 1976. He also performed in Europe.

Alexander recorded two albums, The Rattler (1972) and The Dirt on the Ground (1973), for Arhoolie Records, containing the songs "The Hoodoo Man (The Voodoo Woman and the Witch Doctor)", "St. James Infirmary", "Blue Tumbleweed", "Sundown", "Sufferin' with the Lowdown Blues", "Strange Woman", "Cold Feelin", "Jimmy, Is That You?", "So You Wanna Be a Man" and "The Dirt on the Ground".

In 1976, he began to perform as Omar the Magnificent, having changed his name to Omar Khayam.

He was nominated for a W. C. Handy Award in 1993.

Have Mercy! Records, a small blues label, released his album Black Widow Spider in 1993, followed by the hit Baddass in 1995 and Anatomy of a Woman in 1998.

In the 2000s Alexander lived and performed mostly in the Sacramento area, where he recorded for Have Mercy! Records. He was an articulate writer, contributing several articles to Living Blues magazine, and an advocate for the blues and African-American music.

On Martin Luther King Day in 2011, the NPR Radio program All Things Considered broadcast a segment about Marshall, Texas, as the birthplace of the boogie-woogie style of piano playing. The broadcast described how Dr. John Tennison, a boogie-woogie musicologist in San Antonio, had shared his knowledge of the history of boogie-woogie with the citizens of Marshall and had located Alexander in Sacramento. Alexander had performed in Marshall in December 2010, to great acclaim. He relocated to Marshall in February 2011 and lived there until his death.

== Death ==
On January 8, 2012, Alexander was found dead of an apparently self-inflicted gunshot wound at his home in Marshall, Texas. He was 73 years old.

== Discography ==
Year	Title	Genre	Label	Recorded name
1972	The Rattler	Blues	Arhoolie	Dave Alexander
1972	The Raven	Blues, Jazz	Arhoolie	Omar Shariff; CD 1993
1973	The Dirt on the Ground	Blues	Arhoolie	Dave Alexander
1993	Black Widow Spider	Blues	Have Mercy!	Omar Sharriff
1995	Baddass	Blues	Have Mercy!	Omar Sharriff
1997	Omar the Magnificent	Blues	Arhoolie	Omar Shariff
1998	Anatomy of a Woman	Blues	Have Mercy!	Omar Sharriff
