= Camarillo Brillo =

Song by Frank Zappa and The Mothers

from the album Over-Nite Sensation
- Released: September 7, 1973
- Recorded: April 4, 1973
- Genre: Progressive rock, comedy rock
- Length: 3:59
- Label: DiscReet
- Songwriter(s): Frank Zappa
- Producer(s): Frank Zappa

"Camarillo Brillo" is a song by Frank Zappa and The Mothers and was first included on his 1973 LP Over-Nite Sensation. The song's lyrics include many colloquialisms and made-up words. The title itself is a pun; Zappa mispronounces Camarillo, the name of a city in California, to rhyme with brillo, "shining" or "brilliant" in Spanish (and the name of a brand of scouring pads).

The meaning of the song is open to different interpretations. The first two lines state "She had that Camarillo Brillo, flaming out along her head." The "Brillo" could simply refer to a woman's fuzzy or curly hair. It might also refer to hair resembling that of a patient who just underwent shock therapy. The latter would be consistent with the fact that Camarillo was once the site of the Camarillo State Mental Hospital, which operated from 1936 to 1997.

"Camarillo Brillo" is in the key of E major, though the key briefly changes to D major during the chorus. The arrangement includes liberal use of brass instruments and a wide range of percussion techniques. It ends with a short coda played on piano. There are two versions of this song, the first being in a slower tempo and the second being a much shorter up tempo version played later in Frank Zappa's career. The shorter version can be heard on You Can't Do That on Stage Anymore, Vol. 6. The reason for changing the song's pace was discussed in an interview with Zappa in which he states that the song was "boring" so they sped it up in future performances.

In 1975, "Muffin Man" was introduced to Zappa's live repertoire, and "Camarillo Brillo" was subsequently played as a medley with the former. Performances of this variety appear on several Zappa releases, including FZ:OZ, Halloween, You Can't Do That on Stage Anymore, Vol. 6, and the concert film Baby Snakes. This song also references quadrophonic speakers and the album on which it appeared; Over-Nite Sensation was recorded and released in quad on the Disc-Reet label.
