= Jimmy McCracklin =

American pianist, singer, and songwriter (1921–2012)

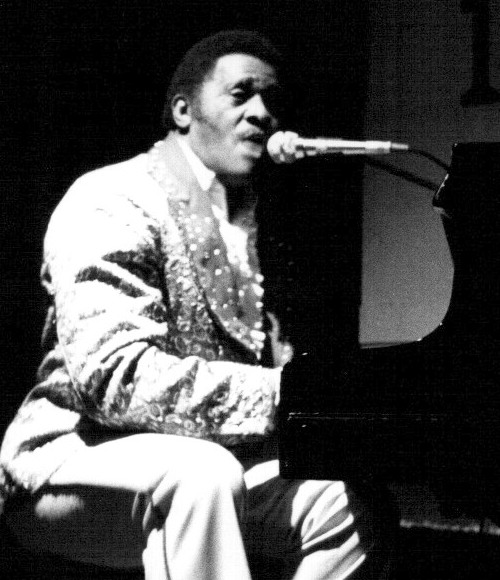
- McCracklin in 1981

Background information
- Born: James David Walker Jr. August 13, 1921; Elaine, Arkansas, U.S.
- Died: December 20, 2012 (aged 91) San Pablo, California, U.S.
- Genres: West Coast blues Jump blues R&B deep soul
- Occupations: Pianist, singer, songwriter, composer
- Years active: 1945–2012
- Labels: Globe Records, Swing Time, Checker Records, Imperial, Peacock, Trilon Records, Modern, Rounder, Classics Records, Bear Family, Ace, Stax, Minit; Hi Records

James David Walker Jr. (August 13, 1921 – December 20, 2012), better known by his stage name Jimmy McCracklin, was an American pianist, singer, and songwriter. His style contained West Coast blues, Jump blues, and R&B. Over a career that spanned seven decades, he said he had written almost a thousand songs and had recorded hundreds of them. McCracklin recorded over 30 albums, and earned four gold records. Tom Mazzolini of the San Francisco Blues Festival said of him, "He was probably the most important musician to come out of the Bay Area in the post-World War II years."

== Biography ==
McCracklin was born James David Walker Jr. on August 13, 1921. Sources differ as to whether he was born in Elaine, Arkansas or St. Louis, Missouri. He joined the United States Navy in 1938, later settled in Richmond, California, and began playing at the local Club Savoy owned by his sister-in-law Willie Mae "Granny" Johnson. The room-length bar served beer and wine, and Granny Johnson served home-cooked meals of greens, ribs, chicken, and other southern cuisine. A house band composed of Bay Area based musicians alternated with and frequently backed performers such as B. B. King, Charles Brown, and L. C. Robinson. Later in 1963 he would write and record a song "Club Savoy" on his I Just Gotta Know album.

Heavily influenced by legendary bluesman Walter Davis, McCracklin recorded a debut single for Globe Records, "Miss Mattie Left Me", in early 1945, and "Street Loafin' Woman" in 1946. He recorded for a number of labels in Los Angeles and Oakland, before joining Modern Records in 1949. He formed a group called Jimmy McCracklin and his Blues Blasters in 1946, with guitarist Robert Kelton, later replaced by Lafayette Thomas who remained with the group until the early 1960s.

His popularity increased after appearing on American Bandstand in support of his self-written single "The Walk" (1957), subsequently released by Checker Records in 1958. It went to No. 5 on the Billboard R&B chart and No. 7 on the pop chart, after more than 10 years of McCracklin selling records in the black community on a series of small labels. Jimmy McCracklin Sings, his first solo album, was released in 1962, in the West Coast blues style. In 1962, McCracklin recorded "Just Got to Know" for his own Art-Tone label in Oakland; the record made No. 2 on the R&B chart. For a brief period in the early 1970s McCracklin ran the Continental Club in Oakland. He booked blues acts such as T-Bone Walker, Irma Thomas, Big Joe Turner, Big Mama Thornton, and Etta James. In 1967, Otis Redding and Carla Thomas had success with "Tramp", a song credited to McCracklin and Lowell Fulson. Salt-n-Pepa made a hip-hop hit out of the song in 1987. Oakland Blues (1968) was an album arranged and directed by McCracklin, and produced by World Pacific. The California rock-n-roll "roots music" band The Blasters named themselves after McCracklin's backing band the Blues Blasters. Blasters' lead singer Phil Alvin explained the origin of the band's name: "I thought Joe Turner's backup band on Atlantic records – I had these 78s – I thought they were the Blues Blasters. It ends up it was Jimmy McCracklin's. I just took the 'Blues' off and Big Joe finally told me, that’s Jimmy McCracklin's name, but you tell 'em I gave you permission to steal it".

McCracklin continued to tour and produce new albums in the 1980s and 1990s. Bob Dylan has cited McCracklin as a favorite. He played at the San Francisco Blues Festival in 1973, 1977, 1980, 1981, 1984 and 2007. He was given a Pioneer Award by the Rhythm and Blues Foundation in 1990, and the Living Legend and Hall of Fame award at the Bay Area Black Music Awards, in 2007. McCracklin continued to write, record, and perform into the 21st century.

He died in San Pablo, California, in the San Francisco Bay Area, on December 20, 2012, after a long illness, aged 91.

== Selected discography ==
Year	Title	Genre	Label
2013	Blues Blasters Boogie: Selected Classic Sides 1945–1955 [4-CD]	West Coast blues	JSP
2007	The Chronological Jimmy McCracklin 1951–1954	West Coast blues	Classics (Blues & Rhythm series)
2004	The Chronological Jimmy McCracklin 1948–1951	West Coast blues	Classics (Blues & Rhythm series)
2004	I Had to Get With It: Best of the Imperial & Minit Years	West Coast blues	Stateside
2004	Blues Blastin' (The Modern Recordings, Volume 2)	West Coast blues	Ace
2003	The Chronological Jimmy McCracklin 1945–1948	West Coast blues	Classics (Blues & Rhythm series)
2003	Jumpin' Bay Area 1948–1955	West Coast blues	P-Vine [Japan]
1999	The Modern Recordings 1948–1950	West Coast blues	Ace
1999	Tell It to the Judge!	West Coast blues	Gunsmoke
1997	The Walk: Jimmy McCracklin at His Best (1956–1969)	West Coast blues, Soul-Blues	Razor & Tie
1994	A Taste of the Blues	West Coast blues	Bullseye Blues/Rounder
1992	The Mercury Recordings	West Coast blues, Soul-Blues	Bear Family
1991	My Story	West Coast blues	Bullseye Blues/Rounder
1988	Same Lovin'	West Coast blues	Evejim
1988	Everybody Rock! The Best of Jimmy McCracklin	West Coast blues	Charly R&B
1987	Blast 'Em Dead!	West Coast blues	Ace
1981	Jimmy McCracklin and His Blues Blasters (Volume One) [10" LP]	West Coast blues	Ace
1978	Rockin' Man	West Coast blues	Stax
1972	Yesterday Is Gone	West Coast blues	Stax
1971	High on the Blues	West Coast blues	Stax
1969	Stinger Man	Soul-Blues	Minit
1968	Let's Get Together	Soul-Blues	Minit
1966	New Soul of Jimmy McCracklin	West Coast blues	Imperial
1966	My Answer	West Coast blues	Imperial
1965	Think	West Coast blues	Imperial
1965	Every Night, Every Day	West Coast blues	Imperial
1963	I Just Gotta Know	West Coast blues	Imperial
1962	Jimmy McCracklin Sings	West Coast blues	Chess
1961	My Rockin' Soul [AKA Twist With Jimmy McCracklin]	West Coast blues	Crown; United

== Quotation ==
"I can watch a guy work, listen to how he pronounce his words," said McCracklin, "and I can tell just how to fit that guy with a song".
