= L. C. Robinson =

American blues musician

- Robinson in 1974.

Background information
- Birth name: Louis Charles Robinson
- Also known as: "Good Rockin'" Robinson
- Born: May 13, 1914; Brenham, Texas, United States
- Died: September 26, 1976 (aged 62); Berkeley, California, United States
- Genres: Blues
- Instrument(s): Vocals, steel guitar, guitar, violin
- Years active: 1930s–1976

L. C. "Good Rockin'" Robinson (born Louis Charles Robinson; May 13, 1914 – September 26, 1976) was an American blues singer, guitarist, and fiddle player. He played an electric steel guitar.

== Biography ==
Robinson was born in Brenham, Texas, United States. He learned to play guitar at nine years of age, and was supposedly mentored by gospel blues singer-guitarist Blind Willie Johnson in the bottleneck style. Later in his career, he was introduced to the steel guitar by Western swing musician Leon McAuliffe, and became a noted fiddle player, who instructed Sugarcane Harris. L. C. Robinson's brother, harmonica player A. C. Robinson, collaborated with him in Texas in the 1930s, and later the two performed and recorded together in a band in California in the 1940s.

Oakland Blues, a studio album Robinson, Lafayette Thomas and Dave Alexander, was released in 1968 by World Pacific Records. This was followed in 1971 by the album Ups and Downs on Arhoolie, on which Robinson was accompanied by the Muddy Waters band and Dave Alexander's trio. This material was later reissued, along with a previously unissued recording of a radio broadcast with his brother the Reverend A. C. Robinson, as Mojo in My Hand.

Robinson played at the San Francisco Blues Festival in both 1973 and 1974. He visited Sweden the following year, but his work was never widely known in Europe.

He died of a heart attack in Berkeley, California in 1976, aged 62.

== Selected discography ==
Year	Title	Genre	Label
1996	Mojo in My Hand (reissued)	R&B	Arhoolie Records
