= Chris Cain =

American blues and jazz guitarist

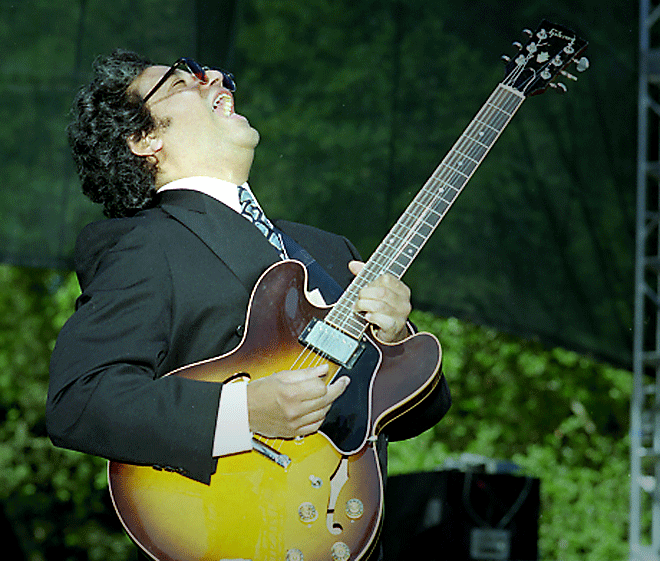
- Cain at the Santa Cruz Blues Festival in 1999

Background information
- Born: November 19, 1955 (age 69); San Jose, California, United States
- Genres: Blues, R&B, Jazz
- Occupation: Musician
- Instrument(s): Vocals, guitar, piano, saxophone
- Years active: 1987–present
- Labels: Various including Blind Pig and Alligator Records
- Website: chriscainmusic.com

Chris Cain (born November 19, 1955) is an American blues musician.

He began playing professionally as a teenager in local clubs, at festivals, and at private events. He attended Pomona College.

Cain received four Blues Music Award nominations in 1987 for his debut album, Late Night City Blues, including Guitarist of the Year. He signed to Blind Pig Records in 1990 and released his second album, Cuttin' Loose, then released Can't Buy A Break in 1992 and Somewhere Along the Way in 1995. 2018 brought more nominations, including Blues Music Awards Guitarist of the Year, Blues Blast Awards Best Males Blues Artist and Best Contemporary Blues Album for the 2017 release, Chris Cain.

== Discography ==
- 1987 - Late Night City Blues (Blue Rock-It Records)
- 1990 - Cuttin' Loose (Blind Pig Records)
- 1992 - Can't Buy a Break (Blind Pig)
- 1995 - Somewhere Along the Way (Blind Pig)
- 1997 - Unscheduled Flight (Blue Rock-It)
- 1998 - Live at the Rep (Chris Cain Records)
- 1999 - Christmas Cain: Blues for the Holidays (Chris Cain Records)
- 2001 - Cain Does King (Blue Rock-It)
- 2003 - Hall of Shame (Blue Rock-It)
- 2010 - So Many Miles (Blue Rock-It)
- 2016 - King of the Blues with Rodger Fox Big Band (T-Bones Records)
- 2017 - Chris Cain (Little Village Foundation)
- 2017 - Romaphonic Session with Nasta Super (Epsa Music)
- 2021 - Raisin' Cain (Alligator Records)
- 2024 - Good Intentions Gone Bad (Alligator Records)

== See also ==
- List of bass guitarists
- List of electric blues musicians
- List of Jazz blues musicians
