= Muffin Man (song) =

Song by Frank Zappa/Captain Beefheart/The Mothers

from the album Bongo Fury
- Released: October 2, 1975
- Recorded: January 1975 (intro), May 1975
- Genre: Progressive rock, hard rock
- Length: 5:33
- Label: DiscReet
- Songwriter: Frank Zappa
- Producer: Frank Zappa

Official audio
- "Muffin Man" on YouTube

"Muffin Man" is a song recorded live by Frank Zappa and the Mothers of Invention. It appears on his 1975 mostly live album Bongo Fury made with Captain Beefheart (Don Van Vliet).

== Background ==
The song begins with studio-recorded spoken word lyrics delivered by Zappa and is followed by the chorus. The song was inspired by the traditional nursery rhyme, "The Muffin Man". The song closes the album, as well as the 1995 compilation Strictly Commercial, and was also used as a finale in concerts for many years afterwards. The song's tone was compared to Jimi Hendrix's style.

An alternative live version of "Muffin Man" appears on disc one (track 22) of the 1992 compilation You Can't Do That on Stage Anymore, Vol. 6. This song also appears on the 2009 album released by the Zappa Family Trust Philly '76, the 2002 album FZ:OZ and the 2003 album Halloween.

Frank Zappa's son, Dweezil, along with his Zappa Plays Zappa (ZPZ) band, have featured "Muffin Man" on many concert tours. In 2010, they offered video footage of Frank Zappa playing "Muffin Man", along with isolated Frank Zappa guitar parts, so that Dweezil and ZPZ could accompany Frank Zappa and his extended guitar solo.

== Meaning ==
The meaning of the song was never fully explained by Frank Zappa. The "Muffin Man" of the song appears to be a new kind of food aficionado, one who has taken his love for muffins to a scientific and semi-religious level. There are some who have interpreted his loyalty to his favorite food as a parody of the repetitive bourgeois life that Zappa despised.

== Cover version ==
Czech alternative rock band Elektrobus made a cover version of this song in 1975, with Czech lyrics written by the band's drummer Vlastimil Marek. The January 1976 recording was released on the only Elektrobus album Nedefinitivní in 2001.
