= Sugar Pie DeSanto =

American R&B singer (1935–2024)

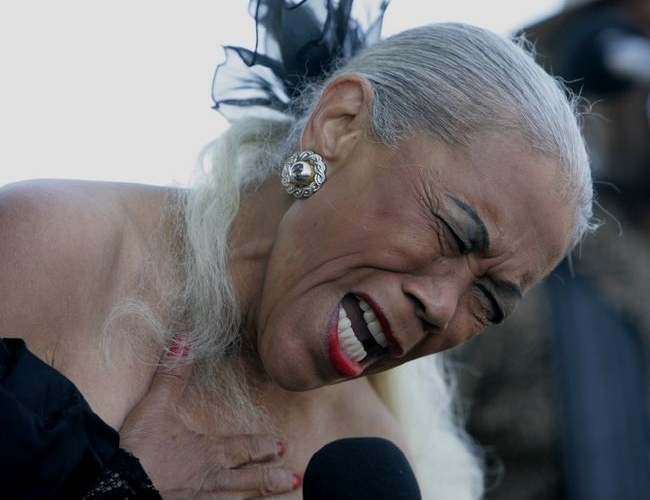
- DeSanto in 2006

Background information
- Born: Peylia Marsema Balinton; October 16, 1935; New York City, U.S.
- Origin: San Francisco, California, U.S.
- Died: December 20, 2024 (aged 89)
- Genres: R&B
- Occupations: Singer; songwriter; dancer; bandleader; record producer
- Years active: 1955–2024
- Website: sugarpiedesanto.com

Peylia Marsema Balinton (October 16, 1935 – December 20, 2024), known professionally as Sugar Pie DeSanto, was an American R&B singer and dancer, whose career in music flourished in the 1950s and 1960s.

== Early life ==
DeSanto was born on October 16, 1935, in New York City, to an African-American mother, who was a concert pianist, and a Filipino father. She spent most of her early life in San Francisco, California, where she moved with her family at the age of four. She stood 4 feet 11 inches (1.50 m). As a girl she was friends with Etta James, and they would later collaborate for two records on Argo Records and Cadet Records in 1966.

== Career ==
Johnny Otis discovered DeSanto in 1955, and she toured with the Johnny Otis Revue. Otis gave her the stage name Sugar Pie. In 1959 and 1960, she toured with the James Brown Revue.

In 1960, DeSanto rose to national prominence when her single "I Want to Know", reached number four on Billboard's Hot R&B chart. She recorded the song with her husband, Pee Wee Kingsley. Soon thereafter their marriage ended. DeSanto moved to Chicago and signed with Chess Records in 1962 as a recording artist and writer. Among her recordings for Chess were "Slip-in Mules" (an "answer song" to "Hi-Heel Sneakers"), "Use What You Got", "Soulful Dress" (her biggest hit for Chess), and "I Don't Wanna Fuss". DeSanto participated in the American Folk Blues Festival tour of Europe in 1964, and her lively performances, including wild dancing and standing back flips, were widely appreciated.

In 1965, DeSanto, under the name Peylia Parham, began a writing collaboration with Shena DeMell. They produced the song "Do I Make Myself Clear", which DeSanto sang as a duet with Etta James. It reached the top 10. It was followed by another DeSanto–James duet, "In the Basement", in 1966. DeSanto's next record, "Go Go Power", did not make the charts, and she and Chess parted ways.

DeSanto kept on writing songs and recorded for a few more labels without much success. She eventually moved back to the Bay Area, settling in Oakland.

DeSanto was given a Bay Area Music Award in 1999 for best female blues singer. In September 2008, she was given a Pioneer Award by the Rhythm and Blues Foundation. She received a lifetime achievement award from the Goldie Awards in November 2009.

DeSanto was honored on December 10, 2020 by the Arhoolie Foundation, a nonprofit that honors artists who preserve traditional music for future generations.

She was a 2024 inductee to the Blues Hall of Fame.

== Personal life and death ==
DeSanto was married to Pee Wee Kingsley in the 1950s. After that marriage ended, she was married to Jesse Earl Davis for 27 years. In October 2006, Davis died attempting to extinguish a fire that destroyed their apartment in Oakland, California.

DeSanto died on December 20, 2024, at the age of 89 in Oakland, California.

== Albums/CDs ==
- Sugar Pie (Checker LP-2979, 1961) − Veltone and Checker material
- Lovin' Touch (Diving Duck DD-4310, 1987) − 1959–1967 recordings
- Down In The Basement: The Chess Years (Chess/MCA CH-9275, 1989)
- Go Go Power: The Complete Chess Singles 1961–1966 (Kent CDKEND-317, 2009)
- A Little Bit of Soul 1957–1962 (Jasmine JASMCD-3081, 2017)

== Popular singles ==
Chart	Peak position
US Hot R&B/Hip-Hop Songs (Billboard) "I Want to Know", with the Pee Wee Kingsley Band, 1960	4
US Hot R&B/Hip-Hop Songs (Billboard) "Slip-In Mules (No High Heel Sneakers)", 1964	10
US Hot R&B/Hip-Hop Songs (Billboard) "Soulful Dress", 1964	19
US Hot R&B/Hip-Hop Songs (Billboard) "Use What You Got" (B-side), 1964	43
US Hot R&B/Hip-Hop Songs (Billboard) "Do I Make Myself Clear", with Etta James, 1965	96
US Hot R&B/Hip-Hop Songs (Billboard) "In the Basement – Part 1", with Etta James, 1966	37
