= Buddy Ace =

American blues singer (1936–1994)

- Born: Jimmie Lee Land; November 11, 1936; Jasper, Texas, U.S.
- Died: December 25, 1994 (aged 58) Waco, Texas, U.S.
- Genre: Texas blues
- Occupation: Singer
- Years active: Early 1950s–1994
- Label: Duke

Jimmie Lee Land (November 11, 1936 – December 25, 1994), better known as Buddy Ace, was an American Texas blues singer, billed as the "Silver Fox of the Blues".

== Biography ==
Born in Jasper, Texas, he was raised in Baytown near Houston, and began his career by singing gospel in a group that included Joe Tex. He joined up with other blues singers, Bobby "Blue" Bland and Junior Parker, before signing to Duke/Peacock Records in 1955 and agreeing to be credited as "Buddy Ace", a name previously used by the late Johnny Ace's brother, St. Clair Alexander.

He recorded a string of singles for the Duke label between 1956 and 1969. His hits included "Nothing in the World Can Hurt Me (Except You)", which reached number 25 on the Billboard R&B chart in 1966. His second and last hit in the R&B chart was in the following year, "Hold On (To This Old Fool)", which made number 33. His other well-known tracks included "Love of Mine", "Root Doctor" and "Pouring Water on a Drowning Man" (all from Don't Hurt No More).

In the late 1960s, he moved to California, living in Los Angeles, Oakland, and Sacramento, and continuing to perform live shows. He also continued to record, for Paula, Evejim, and several smaller labels. He billed himself as the "Silver Fox of the Blues" after his hair turned all white in his forties.

Buddy Ace died of a heart attack aged 58, while performing in Waco, Texas, early on Christmas Day, 1994.

== Discography ==
=== Singles ===
- "Back Home" / "What Can I Do" (Duke 155, Jul 1956)
- "I'm In The Mood" / "It Can't Be True" (Duke 176, Jul 1957)
- "Whooping And Hollering" / "Darling It's You" (Duke 183, Mar 1958)
- "Beyond The Rainbow" / "Angel Boy" (Duke 199, Oct 1958)
- "Someone Kind" / "Oh Why" (Specialty 669, Jun 1959)
- "From These Roots" / "Something New" (Fidelity 3011, Sep 1959)
- "This Little Love Of Mine" / "Won't You Reconsider" (Duke 325, Aug 1960)
- "What Can I Do" / "Screaming Please" (Duke 346, Mar 1962)
- "She Will Love" / "Good Lover" (Duke 361, Apr 1963)
- "It Makes You Want To Cry" / "You've Got My Love" (Duke 373, Dec 1963)
- "My Love" / "True Love, Money Can't Buy" (Duke 381, Aug 1964)
- "Inside Story" / "Just To Hold My Hand" (Duke 391, Apr 1965)
- "Who Can Tell" / "Baby Please Don't Go" (Duke 401, Mar 1966)
- "Nothing In The World Can Hurt Me (Except You)" / "It's Gonna Be Me" (Duke 397, Jul 1966)
- "Hold On (To This Old Fool)" / "Come On In This House" (Duke 414, Jan 1967)
- "Something For These Blues" / "I'm Counting On You" (Duke 419, May 1967)
- "Got To Get Myself Together" / "Darling Depend On Me" (Duke 428, Mar 1968)
- "(Sweet Little) Chocolate Child" / "Jump Up And Shout" (Duke 441, Feb 1969)
- "She's My Baby" / "Never Let Me Go" (Duke 452, Jun 1969)
- "Do What You Think Is Best" / "I Love Your Funki Sole [Funky Soul]" (Paula 336, Sep 1970)
- "Houston Town" / "Fingerprints" (Paula 343, Apr 1971)
- "Kicked The Habit" / "The Real Thing" (Paula 355, Oct 1971)
- "Pleasing You" / "I Wonder" (Paula 371, May 1972)
- "I'm Just A Beggar, Beggin' For Your Love" / "Beggin' For Your Love (Instrumental)" (A & B Records 121, 1972)
- "Color My Love" / "Two Steps From The Blues" (Mind Tripper 100, 1973)
- "Better Think Again" / "I Still Love You (Instrumental)" (Sunny 1001, 1983)
- "I'll Love You (If You Let Me)" / "It's All For You" (Tear Drop 3495, 1985)
- "Love Of Mine" / "Don't Hurt No More" (Blues-B-Us 2016, 1989; Evejim 89512, 1990)
- "Root Doctor" / "I Kicked The Habit" (Evejim 2020, 1989)
- "Fix It Man" / "Keep It In The Family" (Evejim 2039, 1993)

=== Albums ===
- Don't Hurt Me No More (Evejim 2018, 1990) Also released under the title Root Doctor
- The Silver Fox (Evejim 2040, 1992)
- From Me To You Bobby Bland (Evejim 2048, 1995)
- The Real Thing (Jewel 5054, 1996)
- Buddy Ace Meets The Explosive "Mr. Showman" Al 'TNT' Braggs (Jasmine 3167, 2020) Split album

== Bibliography ==
- Encyclopedia of The Blues. Edition 2006, Edward Komara. Routledge, ISBN 0-415-92700-5
