= Wind Up Workin' in a Gas Station =

Song by Frank Zappa

from the album Zoot Allures
- Recorded: May–June 1976
- Studio: Record Plant Studios, Los Angeles, California, U.S.
- Genre: Rock, hard rock, comedy rock
- Length: 2:29
- Label: Warner
- Songwriter(s): Frank Zappa
- Producer(s): Frank Zappa

Official audio
- "Wind Up Workin' in a Gas Station" on YouTube

"Wind Up Workin' in a Gas Station" is the opening song on Frank Zappa's 1976 album Zoot Allures. The song contains a fake German accent from Zappa as a result of Zappa's fascination with the German culture. In concert, the extensive repetition of the lines "Show me your thumb if you're really dumb" was given the response by the audience members putting both thumbs firmly in the air. Despite the lyrics being pessimistic, the song became a fan favorite. A live version, recorded in autumn 1976 with the female lead vocals of Lady Bianca, was published 1992 in You Can't Do That on Stage Anymore, Vol. 6.

== Meaning ==
The song attacks the American school system explaining that even with the highest education, many people will still end up with low pay jobs such as working at a gas station. The "show me your thumb" lines are believed to be a reference to a Gulf gasoline commercial from the 1960s, in which end a gas-station employee putting up his thumb in order to suggest that Gulf is good.

== Personnel ==
=== Musicians ===
- Frank Zappa – guitar, bass, lead vocals, synthesizer
- Terry Bozzio – drums
- Davey Moiré – lead vocals, backing vocals

=== Production staff ===
- Arnie Acosta – mastering
- Amy Bernstein – layout design
- Michael Braunstein – engineer
- Bob Stone – digital remastering
