= West Coast blues =

Style of blues music which incorporates elements of jazz and jump blues

- Stylistic origins: Blues; jazz blues; jump blues; Texas blues
- Cultural origins: 1940s, Texas, U.S.

West Coast blues is a type of blues music influenced by jazz and jump blues, with strong piano-dominated sounds and jazzy guitar solos, which originated from Texas blues players who relocated to California in the 1940s. West Coast blues also features smooth, honey-toned vocals, frequently crossing into rhythm and blues territory.

== Texas and the West Coast ==
Texans who played here included Pee Wee Crayton and T-Bone Walker.

Little Willie Littlefield was a R&B and boogie-woogie pianist and singer whose early recordings helped forge a vital link between boogie-woogie and rock and roll.

== See also ==
- List of West Coast blues musicians
