= The Roxy Performances =

Box set by Frank Zappa
- Released: February 2, 2018
- Recorded: December 8, 9, 10, 12, 1973
- Genre: Jazz fusion
- Length: 477:09
- Label: Zappa Records

Frank Zappa chronology
Halloween 77 (2017)	The Roxy Performances (2018)	Halloween 73 (2019)

The Roxy Performances is a box set by Frank Zappa. It was released as a 7-CD boxset on February 2, 2018. The collection contains four full shows, a rehearsal, a recording session at Bolic Sound, a sound check, and a previously unreleased version of "The Idiot Bastard Son" titled "That Arrogant Dick Nixon".

In addition to previously unreleased material, the box set contains material that was released, in different edits and/or mixes, on Roxy & Elsewhere (1974), Roxy by Proxy (2014), and Roxy – The Movie / Roxy the Soundtrack (2015).

== Track listing (digital version) ==
All tracks are written by Frank Zappa, except at noted.

12-9-73 - first show
No.	Title	Release notes	Length
1.	"Sunday Show 1 Start"	same performance on Roxy the Movie / Roxy the Soundtrack (2015)	4:59
2.	"Cosmik Debris"	same performance on Roxy the Movie / Roxy the Soundtrack (2015)	11:33
3.	""We're Makin' a Movie""	first part of dialog included in Roxy the Movie (2015)	3:16
4.	"Pygmy Twylyte"	previously unreleased	9:08
5.	"The Idiot Bastard Son"	previously unreleased; basic tracks used for "That Arrogant Dick Nixon"	2:19
6.	"Cheepnis"	previously unreleased	3:44
7.	"Hollywood Perverts"	previously unreleased	1:07
8.	"Penguin in Bondage"	same performance on Roxy by Proxy (2014) and Roxy the Movie / Roxy the Soundtrack (2015)	5:54
9.	"T'Mershi Duween"	same performance on Roxy by Proxy (2014) and Roxy the Movie / Roxy the Soundtrack (2015)	1:56
10.	"The Dog Breath Variations"	same performance on Roxy by Proxy (2014) and Roxy the Movie / Roxy the Soundtrack (2015)	1:44
11.	"Uncle Meat"	same performance on Roxy by Proxy (2014); parts of same performance on Roxy the Movie / Roxy the Soundtrack (2015)	2:29
12.	"RDNZL"	same performance on Roxy by Proxy (2014); parts of same performance on Roxy the Movie / Roxy the Soundtrack (2015)	5:14
13.	"Montana"	parts of same performance on You Can't Do That on Stage Anymore, Vol. 4 (1991)	7:49
14.	"Dupree's Paradise"	parts of same performance at beginning of "Let's Move to Cleveland – Solos (1984)" on You Can't Do That on Stage Anymore, Vol. 4 (1991); same performance on Roxy by Proxy (2014)	16:12
15.	"Dickie's Such an Asshole" (encore)	part of same performance on You Can't Do That on Stage Anymore Sampler (1988)	10:17
Total length:			87:42

12-9-73 - second show
No.	Title	Release notes	Length
1.	"Sunday Show 2 Start"	previously unreleased	4:08
2.	"Inca Roads"	same performance on Roxy by Proxy (2014) and Roxy the Movie (2015)	8:27
3.	"Village of the Sun"	same performance on Roxy & Elsewhere (1974), with overdubs recorded at Bolic Sound, Inglewood, CA, and Paramount Recording Studios, Los Angeles	4:19
4.	"Echidna's Arf (of You)"	same performance on Roxy by Proxy (2014) and Roxy the Movie / Roxy the Soundtrack (2015)	4:01
5.	"Don't You Ever Wash That Thing?"	parts of same performance on Roxy & Elsewhere (1974), Roxy by Proxy (2014), Roxy the Movie / Roxy the Soundtrack (2015)	13:22
6.	"Slime Intro"	previously unreleased	0:59
7.	"I'm the Slime"	same performance on You Can't Do That on Stage Anymore, Vol. 1 (1988) and Roxy the Movie (2015)	3:34
8.	"Big Swifty"	same performance on You Can't Do That on Stage Anymore, Vol. 1 (1988) and Roxy the Movie (2015)	9:01
9.	"Tango No. 1 Intro"	parts of the spoken intro on Roxy the Movie / Roxy the Soundtrack (2015)	4:14
10.	"Be-Bop Tango (of the Old Jazzmen's Church)"	previously unreleased	18:12
11.	"Medley: King Kong/Chunga's Revenge/Son of Mr. Green Genes" (encore)	same performance on Roxy by Proxy (2015)	9:46
Total length:			80:04

12-10-73 - first show
No.	Title	Release notes	Length
1.	"Monday Show 1 Start"	previously unreleased	5:31
2.	"Montana"	parts of the same performance on You Can't Do That on Stage Anymore, Vol. 4 (1991); same performance on "Montana" & "Dupree's Paradise" Roxy – Hollywood, CA 1973 video (zappa.com) (2007)	6:57
3.	"Dupree's Paradise"	first audio release; same performance on "Montana" & "Dupree's Paradise" Roxy – Hollywood, CA 1973 video (zappa.com) (2007)	21:26
4.	"Cosmik Intro"	previously unreleased	1:05
5.	"Cosmik Debris"	previously unreleased	8:05
6.	"Bondage Intro"	spoken intro of the same performance on Roxy & Elsewhere (1974); same performance on Roxy the Movie / Roxy the Soundtrack (2015)	1:45
7.	"Penguin in Bondage"	parts of same performance on Roxy the Movie / Roxy the Soundtrack (2015)	6:54
8.	"T'Mershi Duween"	same performance on Roxy by Proxy (2014) and Roxy the Movie / Roxy the Soundtrack (2015)	1:52
9.	"The Dog Breath Variations"	previously unreleased	1:48
10.	"Uncle Meat"	previously unreleased	2:29
11.	"RDNZL"	same performance on Roxy the Movie / Roxy the Soundtrack (2015)	4:59
12.	"Audience Participation – RDNZL"	same spoken performance (minus the "Pygmy Twylyte" intro at the end) on Roxy the Movie (2015)	3:08
13.	"Pygmy Twylyte"	previously unreleased	4:05
14.	"The Idiot Bastard Son"	previously unreleased	2:21
15.	"Cheepnis"	same performance (different mix) as Roxy by Proxy (2014)	4:49
16.	"Dickie's Such an Asshole" (encore)	part of same performance on You Can't Do That on Stage Anymore, Vol. 3 (1988); same performance (spoken intro edited) on Roxy the Movie (2015)	10:21
Total length:			87:36

12-10-73 - second show
No.	Title	Release notes	Length
1.	"Monday Show 2 Start"	previously unreleased	5:13
2.	"Penguin in Bondage"	parts of same performance on Roxy & Elsewhere (1974); parts of the same performance on Roxy the Movie / Roxy the Soundtrack (2015)	6:33
3.	"T'Mershi Duween"	same performance, in lower quality, on Beat the Boots! Piquantique (1991) and Beat the Boots! III (2009)	1:52
4.	"The Dog Breath Variations"	same performance, in lower quality, on Beat the Boots! III (2009)	1:46
5.	"Uncle Meat"	parts of same performance on Roxy the Movie / Roxy the Soundtrack (2015)	2:28
6.	"RDNZL"	previously unreleased	5:17
7.	"Village of the Sun"	same performance on Roxy & Elsewhere (1974), with overdubs recorded at Bolic Sound, Inglewood, CA, and Paramount Recording Studios, Los Angeles	3:59
8.	"Echidna's Arf (of You)"	same performance on Roxy & Elsewhere (1974); parts of the same performance on Roxy the Movie / Roxy the Soundtrack (2015)	3:54
9.	"Don't You Ever Wash That Thing?"	parts of same performance on Roxy & Elsewhere (1974), Roxy by Proxy (2014), Roxy the Movie / Roxy the Soundtrack (2015)	6:56
10.	"Cheepnis – Percussion"	same performance on Roxy by Proxy (2014) and Roxy the Movie / Roxy the Soundtrack (2015)	4:08
11.	""I Love Monster Movies""	same spoken performance on Roxy by Proxy (2014) and Roxy the Movie / Roxy the Soundtrack (2015)	2:10
12.	"Cheepnis"	parts of the same performance on Roxy & Elsewhere (1974); same performance on Roxy the Movie / Roxy the Soundtrack (2015)	3:35
13.	""Turn the Light Off"/Pamela's Intro"	previously unreleased	3:59
14.	"Pygmy Twylyte"	same performance as Roxy the Movie (2015)	7:23
15.	"The Idiot Bastard Son"	same performance as Roxy the Movie (2015)	2:22
16.	"Tango No. 2 Intro"	parts of same performance included on Roxy & Elsewhere (1974)	2:01
17.	"Be-Bop Tango (of the Old Jazzmen's Church)"	parts of the same performance on Roxy & Elsewhere (1974) and Roxy the Movie / Roxy the Soundtrack (2015)	22:31
18.	"Dickie's Such an Asshole" (encore)	parts of same performance on You Can't Do That on Stage Anymore, Vol. 3 (1988)	15:31
Total length:			101:39

First Bonus Section - 12-10-73 Roxy rehearsal; Unreleased track; 12-12-73 Bolic Studios recording session
No.	Title	Release notes	Length
1.	"Big Swifty – In Rehearsal"	previously unreleased	2:50
2.	"Village of the Sun"	previously unreleased	3:13
3.	"Farther O'Blivion – In Rehearsal"	previously unreleased	5:34
4.	"Pygmy Twylyte"	previously unreleased	6:17
5.	"That Arrogant Dick Nixon" (unreleased track)	previously unreleased	2:19
6.	"Kung-Fu – In Session"	previously unreleased	4:50
7.	"Kung-Fu – with guitar overdub"	same recording (different mix) on The Lost Episodes (1996)	1:17
8.	"Tuning and Studio Chatter"	previously unreleased	3:38
9.	"Echidna's Arf (of You) – In Session"	previously unreleased	1:22
10.	"Don't Eat the Yellow Snow – In Session"	last seconds on Apostrophe (') (1974) as basic track for the last seconds, minus overdubs from Paramount Studios, early 1974; parts of same recording on Roxy the Movie (2015) as part of "End Credits"	9:49
11.	"Nanook Rubs It – In Session"	parts of same basic track on Apostrophe (') (1974), minus overdubs from Paramount Studios, early 1974	5:41
12.	"St. Alfonzo's Pancake Breakfast – In Session"	same basic tracks on Apostrophe (') (1974), minus overdubs from Paramount Studios, early 1974	2:46
13.	"Father O'Blivion – In Session"	same basic tracks on Apostrophe (') (1974), minus overdubs from Paramount Studios, early 1974; parts of same recording on Roxy the Movie (2015) as part of "End Credits"	2:31
14.	"Rollo (Be-Bop Version)"	previously unreleased	2:36
Total length:			54:43

- Tracks 1–4: 12-10-73 Roxy rehearsal
- Track 5: basic tracks: 12-9-73 Show 1, overdubs at Paramount Studios
- Tracks 6–14: 12-12-73 Bolic Studios recording session

Second Bonus Section - 12-8-73 Sound Check/Film Shoot
No.	Title	Release notes	Length
1.	"Saturday Show Start"	previously unreleased	2:20
2.	"Pygmy Twylyte/Dummy Up" ("Dummy Up" by Zappa, Jeff Simmons, Napoleon Murphy Brock)	parts of same performance on Roxy & Elsewhere (1974); parts of the "Dummy Up" performance on The True Story of 200 Motels video (1989)	20:25
3.	"Pygmy Twylyte – Part II"	previously unreleased	14:25
4.	"Echidna's Arf (of You)"	previously unreleased	3:42
5.	"Don't You Ever Wash That Thing?"	previously unreleased	6:01
6.	"Orgy, Orgy" (based on "Louie, Louie" by Richard Berry)	previously unreleased	3:39
7.	"Penguin in Bondage"	parts of same performance on Roxy & Elsewhere (1974)	6:30
8.	"T'Mershi Duween"	previously unreleased	1:53
9.	"The Dog Breath Variations"	previously unreleased	1:45
10.	"Uncle Meat/Show End"	previously unreleased	4:01
Total length:			64:41

== Track listing (CD version) ==
Disc one

- Tracks 1–14: 12-9-73 Show 1 (tracks 1–14)
- Total length: 76:43

Disc two

- Track 1: 12-9-73 Show 1 (track 15)
- Tracks 2–9: 12-9-73 Show 2 (tracks 1–8)
- Total length: 58:25

Disc three

- Tracks 1–3: 12-9-73 Show 2 (tracks 9–11)
- Tracks 4–8: 12-10-73 Show 1 (tracks 1–4)
- Total length: 74:57

Disc four

- Tracks 1–11: 12-10-73 Show 1 (tracks 5–16)
- Tracks 12–17: 12-10-73 Show 2 (tracks 1–6)
- Total length: 67:50

Disc five

- Tracks 1–11 12-10-73 Show 2 (tracks 7–17)
- Total length: 62:46

Disc six

- Track 1: 12-10-73 Show 2 (track 18)
- Tracks 2–15: Bonus Section 1 (tracks 1–14)
- Total length: 70:31

Disc seven

- Tracks 1–10: Bonus Section 2: 12-8-73 Sound Check/Film Shoot (tracks 1–10)
- Total length: 64:41

== Personnel ==
=== Musicians ===
- Frank Zappa – lead guitar, vocals, percussion, original producer
- George Duke – keyboards, synthesizer, vocals
- Tom Fowler – bass
- Ruth Underwood – percussion
- Bruce Fowler – trombone, dancing (?)
- Napoleon Murphy Brock – tenor sax, flute, lead vocals
- Ralph Humphrey – drums, percussion
- Chester Thompson – drums, percussion

=== Also featuring ===
- Jeff Simmons – dialog on "Dummy Up"
- Pamela Des Barres – dancing
- Carl Franzoni – dancing
- Brenda – dancing

=== Technical personnel ===
- Kerry McNabb – recording engineer at The Roxy shows and "That Arrogant Dick Nixon"
- Bob Hughes – recording engineer at Bolic Studios
- Doug Graves – recording engineer at Bolic Studios
- Craig Parker Adams – audio restoration, re-mix, mastering
- Bob Stone – digital re-mix engineer (Bolic Studios)
- Ahmet Zappa – producer for release
- Joe Travers – producer for release, liner notes
- Jen Jewel Brown – liner notes
- Dave Alvin – liner notes
