= Halloween 73 =

Live album by Frank Zappa
- Released: October 25, 2019
- Recorded: October 31, 1973
- Venues: Auditorium Theater, Chicago, IL
- Genre: Progressive rock
- Length: 278:22
- Label: Zappa Records
- Producer: Melanie Starks

Frank Zappa chronology
The Roxy Performances (2018)	Halloween 73 (2019)	The Hot Rats Sessions (2019)

Professional ratings
Review scores
Source	Rating
AllMusic	3.5/5 stars

Halloween 73 is a live album by Frank Zappa, released in October 2019, consisting of recordings from the six Halloween shows in Chicago. It was released in a 4-CD boxed set and a different version of the album containing the highlights on a single CD.

== Track listing ==
Disc one (first show)
No.	Title	Length
1.	"Happy Halloween to Each and Every One of You"	4:36
2.	"Pygmy Twylyte"	3:25
3.	"The Idiot Bastard Son"	2:24
4.	"Cheepnis"	3:28
5.	"Another Assembly of Items"	1:29
6.	"The Eric Dolphy Memorial Barbecue"	1:02
7.	"Kung Fu"	1:32
8.	"Penguin in Bondage"	7:12
9.	"T’Mershi Duween"	1:46
10.	"The Dog Breath Variations"	1:47
11.	"Uncle Meat"	5:54
12.	"RDNZL"	5:54
13.	"Village of the Sun"	4:14
14.	"Echidna’s Arf (Of You)"	4:11
15.	"Don’t You Ever Wash That Thing?"	9:54
16.	"Montana"	6:55
Total length:		62:12

Disc two (first and second show)
No.	Title	Length
1.	"Dupree’s Paradise"	19:12
2.	"Almost Up to Date"	1:35
3.	"Dickie’s Such an Asshole"	10:04
4.	"That Greatest of American Holidays"	4:50
5.	"Cosmik Debris"	6:51
6.	"We’re Hurtin’ for Tunes"	1:04
7.	"Pygmy Twylyte"	3:40
8.	"The Idiot Bastard Son"	2:17
9.	"Cheepnis"	4:18
10.	"I'm the Slime"	4:29
11.	"Big Swifty"	9:37
Total length:		67:56

Note: Second show starts from track 4.

Disc three (second show)
No.	Title	Length
1.	"The History of the San Clemente Magnetic Deviation"	1:50
2.	"Dickie’s Such an Asshole"	9:59
3.	"Another New Event"	0:56
4.	"Farther O’Blivion – Part 1"	9:03
5.	"Farther O’Blivion – Part 2"	10:10
6.	"Pervert’s Special Holiday"	1:10
7.	"Penguin in Bondage"	7:27
8.	"T’Mershi Duween"	1:45
9.	"RDNZL"	6:06
10.	"Inca Roads"	10:55
11.	"Medley: Son of Mr. Green Genes/King Kong/Chunga’s Revenge"	16:23
Total length:		75:44

Disc four (Bonus Rehearsals)
No.	Title	Length
1.	"The Eric Dolphy Memorial Barbecue" (10-21-73)	1:05
2.	"Penguin in Bondage" (10-20-73)	6:45
3.	"T’Mershi Duween" (10-20-73)	1:46
4.	"Dog Breath" (10-20-73)	1:28
5.	"The Dog Breath Variations" (10-20-73)	1:20
6.	"Uncle Meat" (10-20-73)	2:18
7.	"RDNZL" (10-20-73)	5:10
8.	"Magic Fingers" (10-21-73)	4:47
9.	"Inca Roads" (10-20-73)	14:38
10.	"Farther O’Blivion" (10-21-73)	17:54
11.	"Cosmik Debris" (10-20-73)	10:36
12.	"Big Swifty" (10-21-73)	4:41
Total length:		72:28

Halloween 73 Highlights
No.	Title	Length
1.	"Happy Halloween to Each and Every One Of You" (Show 1)	4:36
2.	"Pygmy Twylyte" (Show 2)	3:40
3.	"The Idiot Bastard Son" (Show 2)	2:17
4.	"Cheepnis" (Show 2)	3:18
5.	"Another Assembly of Items" (Show 1)	1:29
6.	"The Eric Dolphy Memorial Barbecue" (Show 1)	1:02
7.	"Kung Fu" (Show 1)	1:32
8.	"Penguin in Bondage" (Show 1)	7:12
9.	"T'Mershi Duween" (Show 1)	1:46
10.	"The Dog Breath Variations" (Show 1)	1:47
11.	"Uncle Meat" (Show 1)	2:24
12.	"RDNZL" (Show 1)	5:50
13.	"I'm the Slime" (Show 2)	4:29
14.	"Big Swifty" (Show 2)	9:25
15.	"The History of the San Clemente Magnetic Deviation" (Show 2)	1:48
16.	"Dickie's Such an Asshole" (Show 2)	10:24
Total length:		63:02

== Personnel ==
Musicians

- Frank Zappa – guitar, vocals
- George Duke – keyboards, vocals
- Napoleon Murphy Brock – vocals, tenor sax, flute
- Tom Fowler – bass
- Ruth Underwood – percussion
- Bruce Fowler – trombone
- Ralph Humphrey – drums, cowbells
- Chester Thompson – drums
