= Roxy by Proxy =

Live album by Frank Zappa
- Released: March 15, 2014
- Recorded: December 9–10, 1973
- Venue: The Roxy Theatre (Hollywood, California)
- Genre: Jazz fusion; progressive rock; hard rock
- Length: 75:49
- Label: Zappa Records; Catalog Number: ZR 20017
- Producer: Frank Zappa

Frank Zappa chronology
Joe's Camouflage (2013)	Roxy by Proxy (2014)	Dance Me This (2015)

Roxy by Proxy is a live album by Frank Zappa, recorded in December 1973 at The Roxy Theatre in Hollywood, California and released posthumously in March 2014 by The Zappa Family Trust on Zappa Records.

== History ==
In September 1974, parts of the five shows on December 8, 9 & 10, 1973 (early and late shows on 9th and 10th) at The Roxy Theatre in West Hollywood, California were released on the double-LP set Roxy & Elsewhere, along with music recorded a few months later (on May 8, 1974, at the Edinboro State College, Edinboro, Pennsylvania and on May 11, 1974, at the Auditorium Theatre in Chicago, Illinois), with all of that material being overdubbed and remixed.

Roxy by Proxy consists of unreleased material recorded live from the four shows held on December 9 & 10, 1973 at The Roxy (early and late shows). The album uses a mix from March/April 1987 by Bob Stone at the Utility Muffin Research Kitchen. Roxy by Proxy presents the material without overdubs, closer to what the audiences heard live (some songs are combinations from different shows), and is different from material released on Roxy & Elsewhere in 1974.

Additional material from these shows was released on Roxy The Movie and Roxy the Soundtrack in 2015, with new mix by Bruce Botnick. All five shows were released in full on The Roxy Performances 7 CD box set in 2018, with audio restoration and 2016 mixes by Craig Parker Adams.

== Track listing ==
All tracks are written by Frank Zappa.

No.	Title	Source	Length
1.	"Carved in the Rock"	December 9 (late show)	3:30
2.	"Inca Roads"	December 9 (early show + late show)	8:21
3.	"Penguin in Bondage"	December 9 (early show)	5:52
4.	"T'Mershi Duween"	December 9 (early show)	1:55
5.	"The Dog Breath Variations / Uncle Meat"	December 9 (early show)	4:13
6.	"RDNZL"	December 9 (early show + late show)	5:27
7.	"Village of the Sun"	December 9 (late show)	3:21
8.	"Echidna's Arf (Of You)"	December 9 (late show)	4:00
9.	"Don't You Ever Wash That Thing?"	December 9 (late show) + December 10 (late show)	6:59
10.	"Cheepnis – Percussion"	December 10 (late show)	3:53
11.	"Cheepnis"	December 10 (early show)	3:35
12.	"Dupree's Paradise"	December 9 (early show)	15:12
13.	"King Kong / Chunga's Revenge / Mr. Green Genes"	December 9 (late show)	9:13

== Personnel ==
=== Musicians ===
- Frank Zappa – lead guitar, vocals
- George Duke – keyboards, synthesizer, vocals
- Tom Fowler – bass
- Ruth Underwood – percussion
- Bruce Fowler – trombone, dancing (?)
- Napoleon Murphy Brock – tenor sax, flute, vocals
- Ralph Humphrey – drums
- Chester Thompson – drums

== Mixing ==
- 1987 Digital Re-Mix Engineer – Bob Stone, UMRK March/April
- Source: 44.1K 16B 1630 Digital Masters
