= Road Tapes, Venue 2 =

Road Tapes, Venue #2

Live album by Frank Zappa
- Released: October 31, 2013
- Recorded: August 23–24, 1973 (3 shows)
- Venues: Finlandia Hall (Helsinki, Finland)
- Genre: Rock
- Length: 136:16
- Labels: Vaulternative Records; Catalog Number: VR 2013-1

Frank Zappa chronology
AAAFNRAA Baby Snakes: The Compleat Soundtrack (2012)	Road Tapes, Venue #2 (2013)	A Token of His Extreme Soundtrack (2013)

Road Tapes, Venue #2 is a posthumous album of Frank Zappa, released in October 2013, consisting of songs from three concerts held in August 1973 at the Finlandia Hall, Helsinki, Finland: the August 23 early & late shows and the August 24 show. With a duration of more than two hours, this collection gives the experience of a full concert. It is the eighth installment on the Vaulternative Records label that is dedicated to the posthumous release of complete Zappa concerts, following the releases of FZ:OZ (2002), Buffalo (2007), Wazoo (2007), Philly '76 (2009), Hammersmith Odeon (2010), Carnegie Hall (2011) and Road Tapes, Venue #1 (2012).

== Track listing ==
All tracks are written by Frank Zappa.

Disc one
No.	Title	Recorded	Length
1.	"Introcious"	August 24, 1973	5:18
2.	"The Eric Dolphy Memorial Barbecue"	August 24, 1973	1:08
3.	"Kung Fu"	August 24, 1973	1:11
4.	"Penguin in Bondage"	August 24, 1973	4:07
5.	"Exercise #4"	August 23, 1973 (early show)	1:58
6.	"Dog Breath"	August 23, 1973 (early show)	1:36
7.	"The Dog Breath Variations"	August 23, 1973 (early show)	1:30
8.	"Uncle Meat"	August 23, 1973 (early show)	2:27
9.	"RDNZL"	August 23, 1973 (early show)	6:17
10.	"Montana"	August 24, 1973	7:02
11.	"Your Teeth and Your Shoulders and sometimes your foot goes like this...../Pojama Prelude"	August 24, 1973	10:14
12.	"Dupree's Paradise"	August 24, 1973	15:55
13.	"All Skate/Dun-Dun-Dun (The Finnish Hit Single)"	August 23, 1973 (early show)	14:10
Total length:			72:53

Disc two
No.	Title	Recorded	Length
1.	"Village of the Sun"	August 24, 1973	5:40
2.	"Echidna's Arf (Of You)"	August 24, 1973	4:22
3.	"Don't You Ever Wash That Thing?"	August 24, 1973	9:56
4.	"Big Swifty"	August 23, 1973 (late show)	12:58
5.	"Farther O'Blivion"	August 23, 1973 (late show) & August 24, 1973	22:54
6.	"Brown Shoes Don't Make It"	August 23, 1973 (early show)	7:33
Total length:			63:23

== Personnel ==
- Frank Zappa – lead vocals, guitar
- Ruth Underwood – percussion
- Ralph Humphrey – drums, cowbells
- George Duke – keyboards, vocals
- Tom Fowler – electric bass
- Jean-Luc Ponty – violin
- Bruce Fowler – trombone
- Ian Underwood – bass clarinet, synthesizer
