= One Size Fits All (Frank Zappa album) =

Studio album with live elements by Frank Zappa and the Mothers of Invention
- Released: June 25, 1975
- Recorded: August 27, 1974– April 1975
- Studios: Record Plant Studios, Los Angeles, California; Caribou Ranch, Nederland, Colorado; and Paramount Studios, Los Angeles, California
- Genres: Jazz fusion; progressive rock
- Length: 43:55
- Label: DiscReet
- Producer: Frank Zappa

Frank Zappa and the Mothers of Invention chronology
Roxy & Elsewhere (1974)	One Size Fits All (1975)	Bongo Fury (1975)

Singles from One Size Fits All
- 1. "Du Bist Mein Sofa" Released: 1975

Professional ratings
Review scores
Source	Rating
AllMusic	4/5 stars
Christgau's Record Guide	C+
Kerrang!	3/5 stars

One Size Fits All is the twentieth album by Frank Zappa and the fourteenth and final studio album by the Mothers of Invention. It was released in June 1975 on Zappa's own DiscReet label. The album peaked at number 26 on the Billboard Top LPs & Tape chart in the United States in August 1975.

The album features the summer/fall 1974 lineup of the Mothers, with keyboardist/vocalist George Duke, drummer Chester Thompson, percussionist Ruth Underwood, bass guitarist Tom Fowler and saxophonist/vocalist Napoleon Murphy Brock. “Can’t Afford No Shoes” features bassist James Youmans, who temporarily joined when Fowler broke his hand while on tour.

Zappa was very proud of this album and he complained about the lack of promotion given to it by the distributor Warner Bros. Records.

== Music ==
The album features one of Zappa's most complex compositions, "Inca Roads". The basic tracks of this piece originated from a performance at KCET TV studios in Los Angeles on August 27, 1974, while the guitar solo came from a concert in Helsinki on September 22 or 23, 1974. The basic tracks for "Florentine Pogen" were also from the KCET performance. Studio overdubs were later added to both songs for release on the album. The KCET performances were also used as a source for Zappa's video releases A Token of His Extreme and The Dub Room Special. In 1988 Zappa released You Can't Do That on Stage Anymore, Vol. 2 from the Helsinki concerts, including the unedited "Inca Roads" solo.

Johnny "Guitar" Watson, one of Zappa's musical heroes, guests on two tracks ("flambé" vocals on the out-choruses of "San Ber'dino" and "Andy"). Captain Beefheart also appears under the pseudonym "Bloodshot Rolling Red," playing harmonica "when present".

Zappa stated that this album was recorded simultaneously with his "next studio album" however, this next album would be replaced by Bongo Fury, consisting mostly of live recordings with Beefheart from May 1975. From comments Zappa made in radio interviews in April 1975, it seems likely that the unreleased next album would have included "Greggery Peccary," which first appeared three years later on Studio Tan.

== Artwork ==
According to François Couture of AllMusic: "The album artwork features a big maroon sofa, a conceptual continuity clue arching back to a then-undocumented live suite (from which "Sofa" was salvaged) and a sky map with dozens of bogus stars and constellations labeled with inside jokes in place of names."

== Release history ==
Early U.S. LP pressings of One Size Fits All have the catalog number "BS 2879" inscribed - and crossed out - in the runoff matrix, indicating that at one point One Size Fits All was planned for release on the Warner Bros. label. An April 1975 interview with Zappa confirms this. The Warner subsidiary Reprise Records distributed Zappa's DiscReet Records label. The album was ultimately released on DiscReet with a catalog number in Reprise's sequence, DS 2216. Warner Bros. did not reassign the number BS 2879 to another album.

In addition to the usual stereo version, a four-channel quadraphonic version of this album was also advertised but never released. The quadraphonic version was assigned catalog number BS4-2879 for release on LP in the Compatible Discrete 4 format and L9B-2879 Quadraphonic 8-track tape format.

One Size Fits All was first released on CD by Rykodisc in 1988. It was reissued by Rykodisc in 1995 with restored cover art, but with identical sound quality. In 1996 a 24-karat gold Au20 edition was released with significantly improved sound quality. In 2012 it was remastered and reissued yet again by the Universal Music Group under the Zappa Records imprint.

In 2025 the 50th Anniversary Edition was released on five discs (four CDs and one Blu-Ray) and streaming, including 5.1 mix, studio outtakes and live performances from Rotterdam (9/28/74) and Gothenburg (9/25/74) shows. Also included is a 1975 four-channel mix of "Sofa #1" from the unreleased quadraphonic album.

== Critical reception and legacy ==
Village Voice critic Robert Christgau wrote in his review: "Zappa's music has gotten a little slicker rhythmically—which is what happens when you consort with jazz guys—but basically it's unchanged. And his satire has neither improved nor deteriorated—if his contempt would be beneath an overbright high school junior, there's also a brief lieder parody that I'd love to jam onto WQXR." ("Evelyn, A Modified Dog" or "Sofa No.2" is the "lieder parody" Christgau had in mind.)

François Couture of AllMusic gave One Size Fits All four stars out of five, and said that it was "an essential third-period Zappa album."

== Track listing ==
All tracks are written by Frank Zappa.

Side one
No.	Title	Length
1.	"Inca Roads"	8:45
2.	"Can't Afford No Shoes"	2:38
3.	"Sofa No. 1"	2:39
4.	"Po-Jama People"	7:39
Total length:		22:15

Side two
No.	Title	Length
5.	"Florentine Pogen"	5:27
6.	"Evelyn, A Modified Dog"	1:04
7.	"San Ber'dino"	5:57
8.	"Andy"	6:04
9.	"Sofa No. 2"	2:42
Total length:		21:40

=== 50th Anniversary Edition ===
Disc one - Full album and Outtakes
No.	Title	Length
10.	"Inca Roads" (Rough Mix)	8:54
11.	"Ralph Stuffs His Shoes" (“Token” Outtake)	2:30
12.	"Ralph Stuffs His Shoes" (Basic Tracks, Take 5)	5:15
13.	"Ralph Stuffs His Shoes" (Instrumental Mix, Master Take)	4:48
14.	"Can’t Afford No Shoes" (Rough Mix)	4:43
15.	"Sofa No. 1" (Basic Tracks, Take 6)	2:44
16.	"Sofa No. 1" (Master Take, Early Mix)	2:42

Disc two - Outtakes
No.	Title	Length
1.	"Po-Jama People" (Old Mix)	8:18
2.	"Florentine Pogen" (Rough Mix)	9:07
3.	"Florentine Pogen" (Alternate Solo)	3:15
4.	"Evelyn, A Modified Dog" (Session Outtakes)	3:15
5.	"Bitch, Bitch, Bitch" (In Rehearsal)	9:28
6.	"Bitch, Bitch, Bitch" (Basic Tracks, Take 1)	5:20
7.	"San Ber’dino" (Rough Mix I)	7:37
8.	"San Ber’dino" (Rough Mix II)	8:13
9.	"San Ber’dino" (Rough Mix III)	6:41
10.	"Something/Anything" (Rough Mix)	6:18
11.	"Andy" (Rough Mix)	6:00
12.	"Sofa No. 2" (Rough Mix)	2:38

Disc three - Live in Rotterdam, Netherlands 9/28/1974
No.	Title	Length
1.	"Tush Tush Tush (A Token of My Extreme)"	3:20
2.	"Stink-Foot"	5:24
3.	"Inca Roads"	12:27
4.	"Approximate"	6:59
5.	"Cosmik Debris"	12:54
6.	"Florentine Pogen"	9:42
7.	"Montana"	12:51
8.	"RDNZL"	11:23

Disc four - Live in Rotterdam, Netherlands 9/28/1974 continued + bonus live tracks
No.	Title	Length
1.	"Dupree’s Paradise Intro"	7:35
2.	"Blind Mice Blues"	4:51
3.	"Dupree’s Paradise" (Part 1)	9:25
4.	"Dupree’s Paradise" (Part 2)	18:05
5.	"Pygmy Twylyte"	11:24
6.	"Room Service"	6:12
7.	"Tush Tush Tush (End Vamp)"	0:58
8.	"Ralph Stuffs His Shoes" (Live in Gothenburg, Sweden, 9/25/1974)	6:03
9.	"Po-Jama People" (Live in Gothenburg, Sweden, 9/25/1974)	7:16

== Personnel ==
=== Musicians ===
- Frank Zappa – guitar, lead (4, 6, 9) and backing vocals
- George Duke – keyboards, lead (1, 8, 9) and backing vocals, synthesizer
- Napoleon Murphy Brock – flute, lead (5, 8) and backing vocals, tenor saxophone
- Ruth Underwood – marimba, vibraphone, percussion
- Chester Thompson – drums, sound effects, voices
- Tom Fowler – bass guitar (all but 2)
- James "Bird Legs" Youmans – bass guitar (2)
- Johnny "Guitar" Watson – vocals (7, 8)
- Captain Beefheart (credited as "Bloodshot Rollin' Red") – harmonica (7)

=== Production ===
- Kerry McNabb – engineer, remixing
- Cal Schenkel – design, illustrations, paintings
- Mike D. Stone of the Record Plant – engineer
- Michael Braunstein – engineer
- Unity – assistant engineer
- Dick Barber – assistant engineer, assistant
- Gary O. – engineer
- Ferenc Dobronyi – design
- J.E. Tully – design
- Coy Featherstone – assistant engineer
- Paul Hof – assistant engineer, assistant
- Matti Laipio – voices, assistant engineer
- Bill Romero – voices, assistant engineer
- Richard "Tex" Abel – assistant engineer, assistant
- Jukka – engineer

== Charts ==
Chart (1975)	Peak position
Australia (Kent Music Report)	81
US Top LPs & Tape (Billboard)	26
