= Zappa Plays Zappa =

American tribute band

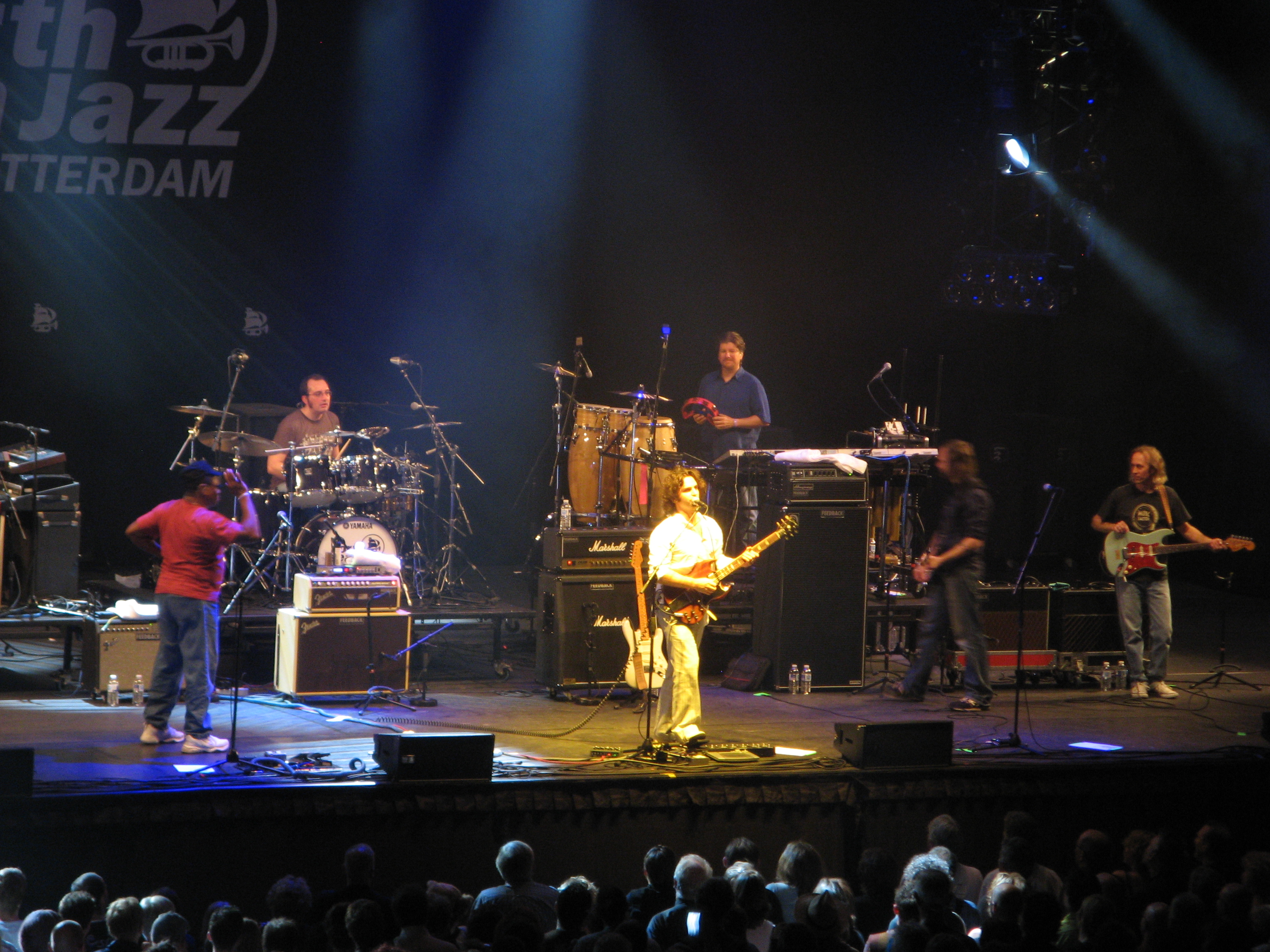
- Zappa Plays Zappa, North Sea Jazz Festival, Ahoy, Rotterdam, 2008.

Background information
- Also known as: Dweezil Zappa Plays Frank Zappa (2016)
- Origin: Los Angeles, California, United States
- Genres: Rock, experimental rock, jazz-rock
- Years active: 2006–present
- Label: Razor & Tie
- Members: Dweezil Zappa; Scheila Gonzalez; Ryan Brown; Kurt Morgan; Zach Tabori; Bobby Victor
- Past members: Aaron Arntz; Pete Griffin; Billy Hulting; Jamie Kime; Joe Travers; Ben Thomas; David Luther; Cian Coey; Chris Norton; Adam Minkoff; Kevin Bents

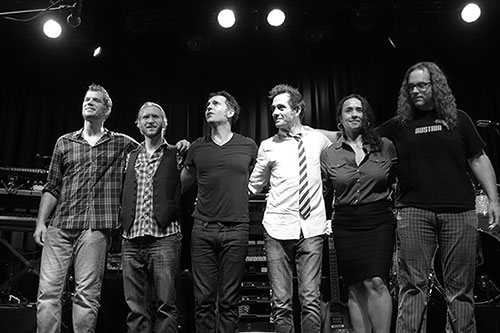
Zappa Plays Zappa in Aarhus, Denmark, 2015

Zappa Plays Zappa is an American tribute act led by Dweezil Zappa, the elder son of late American composer and musician Frank Zappa, devoted to performing the music of Frank Zappa.

== History ==
The band debuted in 2006 with shows in Europe, Canada, and the United States during May and June (the tour was also known as Zappa Plays Zappa: Tour de Frank'). The shows presented a collection of Frank Zappa's rock-oriented compositions from the 1960s to the late 1970s. Apart from Dweezil Zappa on lead guitar, many of the band members previously played with Frank Zappa. Among those, Napoleon Murphy Brock (sax, flute, and vocals) was an integral part of the band, while drummer/vocalist Terry Bozzio and guitarist Steve Vai performed as guests in parts of the shows. At several shows the live band played along with audio and video recordings of Frank Zappa himself, notably portions of "Chunga's Revenge", "Dumb All Over", "Cosmik Debris", and "Muffin Man".

After a break, the band played again in the U.S. during the fall of 2006, including a show in New York on October 31. That revived Frank Zappa's tradition of playing Halloween shows in New York. A DVD documenting the 2006 tour was released in early 2008.

In July and August 2007, the band played a North American tour, with a core lineup similar to that of the 2006 band. The band then played in Europe during September and October before returning to the US, starting with another Halloween show in New York. Special guest on the tour was vocalist and guitarist Ray White, a Zappa stalwart performer in the 1970s and early 1980s. They ended the 2007 tour in Australia in early December before doing a handful of shows in Japan in January 2008. Steve Vai returned as a guest on those shows. A brief tour of U.S. and Canadian dates was then scheduled for the Summer of 2008 with the same lineup as the 2007 tour.

At the 51st Grammy Awards in February 2009, Zappa Plays Zappa won Best Rock Instrumental Performance for their performance of the Frank Zappa instrumental classic "Peaches en Regalia".

Frank Zappa's bands underwent many changes of members, and Zappa Plays Zappa has done the same. The first changes came in 2009–2010, starting with the departure of Aaron Arntz from the keyboard chair, followed quickly by the replacement of guest vocalist Ray White with the hiring of full-time singer/multi-instrumentalist Ben Thomas. Shortly thereafter, keyboardist/singer Chris Norton was added to the lineup.

After the first few tours an additional event was added to the touring cycle. A music bootcamp created by Dweezil, aptly named Dweezilla, afforded the band the opportunity to teach students in a totally immersive environment. Dweezilla also created the opportunity for certain alumni to participate in a performance.

In 2012, the band line up changed again. Original core band bassist Pete Griffin was let go. He was quickly replaced by Zappa alumni bassist Scott Thunes, who also used to be in Dweezil's band Z. He stood in while a permanent replacement was found. The next transformation of the band was complete when bassist Kurt Morgan joined.

Just as Frank Zappa's bands changed size year after year, Zappa Plays Zappa once again followed suit, reducing its membership to six rather than eight musicians. Original core band members Jamie Kime and Billy Hulting went on to other projects at that time.

The 2014 Zappa Plays Zappa tour was a tribute to the classic 1974 album Roxy and Elsewhere. ZPZ performed the material from Roxy in its entirety, in the same order as the original album.

The 2015 tour was also a tribute, this time to the album One Size Fits All and like the Roxy tour it celebrates its 40th anniversary. The show starts with a full performance of the album in its entirety, in the original order. The main set includes songs by the original lineup of The Mothers of Invention including "Who Needs the Peace Corps?" and "What's the Ugliest Part of Your Body?"

=== Trademark disputes ===
In April 2016, Dweezil Zappa announced that he would be changing the name of the band to Dweezil Zappa Plays Frank Zappa, in response to a cease-and-desist order by the Zappa Family Trust, which represents Zappa's estate. Following the October 2015 death of Gail Zappa, control of the trust was taken over by his siblings Ahmet and Diva Zappa, with Ahmet handling day-to-day operations. The trust holds a trademark on the name "Zappa Plays Zappa", which Dweezil had already licensed from Gail. Despite that, the Trust ordered Dweezil to cease using the trademark. The Trust also argued that his shows were a "dramatic work", thus ineligible for the blanket compulsory license for live performance venues as specified in section 115 of United States copyright law, and requiring Dweezil to negotiate "grand rights" directly from the trust or be liable for copyright infringement. Ahmet argued that he was not trying to inhibit his ability to tour under his father's name, but wanted to ensure that Zappa Plays Zappa would be "in accordance with the family trust". A lawyer interviewed by The New York Times disagreed with that theory, arguing that the concept of grand rights is intended primarily for works such as stage musicals, and that a concert by a cover band was not a "dramatic work".

A lawyer representing the Trust later told Dweezil that "Dweezil Zappa Plays Frank Zappa" infringed on the Trust's trademarks for "Zappa" and "Frank Zappa". In June 2016, Dweezil announced that he would hold a tour to celebrate the 50th anniversary of the release of Zappa's first album, Freak Out!. In reference to the dispute, it was titled 50 Years of Frank: Dweezil Zappa Plays Whatever the F@%k He Wants – The Cease and Desist Tour.

Dweezil Zappa announced a reconcililiation in May 2018. However, in an in-depth feature about the family that appeared in August 2024 in The Washington Post, Dweezil declined to participate in meetings with the family and his wife texted to the author, "Dweezil isn’t interested in spending any time in the presence of his brother. Ever.”

== Albums ==
In 2012, ZPZ (consisting of Dweezil and an eight-piece band) released a double live album, F. O. H.—the abbreviation of "front of house", the technical term for the sound as it is mixed and amplified for the audience at a live venue. The tracks were recorded directly in two tracks, and no dubbing took place. Dweezil Zappa explained, though, that Universal Audio software was used to make individual compositions sound as if they were recorded with the equipment that his father used for those compositions.

== Musicians ==
Current Touring Group:

- Dweezil Zappa – lead guitar, vocals (2006–)
- Scheila Gonzalez – saxophone, flute, keyboards, harmonica, vocals (2006–)
- Kurt Morgan – bass, vocals (2012–)
- Ryan Brown – drums, percussion, vocals (2013–)
- Bobby Victor- keyboards, vocals (2024-)

Former members:

- Aaron Arntz – keyboards, trumpet, vocals (2006–2009)
- Pete Griffin – bass (2006–2011)
- Joe Travers – drums, vocals (2006–2013)
- Billy Hulting – marimba, mallets, percussions (2006–2013)
- Jamie Kime – rhythm guitar, vocals (2006–2013)
- Ben Thomas – lead vocals, trumpet, trombone, rhythm guitar (2009–2016)
- Chris Norton – keyboards, violin, percussion, vocals (2009–2016)
- Scott Thunes – bass, vocals (2012)
- Mikki Hommel – vocals (2016)
- Cian Coey – vocals (2016–2019)
- David Luther – vocals, saxophone, guitar, keyboards (2016–2017)
- Adam Minkoff – vocals, guitar, keyboards, percussion, flute, recorder, mandolin (2017-2020)
- Kevin Bents – keyboards, vocals (2020)
- Zach Tabori - guitar, vocals, drums, percussion (2024-2025)

Guests on most 2006 shows:

- Napoleon Murphy Brock – vocals, saxophone, flute
- Terry Bozzio – drums, vocals
- Steve Vai – guitar

Guest on 2007, 2008 and some 2009 shows:

- Ray White – vocals, guitar

Guests on some 2010 shows:

- George Duke – vocals, keyboard
- Scott Thunes – bass
- Jeff Simmons – bass, vocals
- Moon Zappa – vocals

Guests on some 2011 shows:

- Mark Volman – vocals
- Howard Kaylan – vocals
- Jean-Luc Ponty – violin
- Chick Corea – keyboards
- Frank Gambale – guitar
- Guthrie Govan – guitar

Guest on some 2012 shows:

- Allan Holdsworth – guitar
- Chester Thompson – drums
- Sioned Eleri Roberts – clarinet

Guest on some 2015 shows

- Rachel Flowers – keyboards, guitar, vocals
- Vinnie Colaiuta – drums
- Tal Wilkenfeld – bass

Guest on some 2017 shows

- Ike Willis – vocals
- Vinnie Colaiuta – drums

== Discography ==
=== Live albums ===
Titles	Label	Year	Guests
Zappa Plays Zappa	Razor & Tie, Strobosonic	2008	Steve Vai, Terry Bozzio and Napoleon Murphy Brock
Dweezil Zappa With Zappa Plays Zappa - 10/17/08 Chicago, IL	Nugs.net	2008	none
Live - 'In The Moment' (Released as Dweezil Zappa)	Fantom Records	2011	Chick Corea
F.O.H. (Released as Dweezil Zappa)	Fantom Records	2012	none
F.O.H. 3 Out Of Obscurity (Released as Dweezil Zappa)	Fantom Records	2012	none
Live In The Moment II (Released as Dweezil Zappa)	Fantom Records	2018	none

=== Videos ===
Titles	Label	Year
Zappa Plays Zappa	DVD Music Media Ltd	2007
Zappa Plays Zappa	Eagle Rock Entertainment	2015
