= Roxy — The Soundtrack =

Soundtrack album by Frank Zappa
- Released: October 31, 2015
- Recorded: December 8–10, 1973
- Venue: Roxy, Hollywood
- Genre: Rock
- Label: Eagle Vision; Catalog Number: EVB335219
- Producer: Frank Filipetti & Gail Zappa

Frank Zappa chronology
200 Motels: The Suites (2015)	Roxy — The Soundtrack (2015)	Road Tapes, Venue #3 (2016)

Professional ratings
Review scores
Source	Rating

Roxy — The Soundtrack is the CD soundtrack released in the Roxy — The Movie, DVD/CD and Blu-ray/CD sets. The CD soundtrack is not sold separately.

== Background ==
The film used to produce the movie was shot in 1973 using four cameras at five live shows performed on December 8, 9 and 10 (early and late shows on the 9th and 10th). What wasn't known at the time was due to a malfunction the audio and video were recorded out of sync. As John Albanian discusses in the liner notes, the problem was such that not until today's technology could the issue be painstakingly resolved.

This is the third time around for the music from the Roxy shows. In 1974 Roxy & Elsewhere released some of the tracks from these shows and a few others. Then the 2014 Roxy by Proxy release made available more tracks exclusively from the December dates and all different from any on the previous release. This release represents those used in the movie, except tracks 8, 13, 14 & 16.

== Track listing ==
All music is composed by Frank Zappa.

Disc one - Roxy — The Movie (DVD or Blu-ray)
No.	Title	Source	Length
1.	"'Something Terrible Has Happened'"/"Cosmik Debris"	December 9 (early show)	11:18
2.	"Penguin in Bondage"	December 10 (early + late shows)	7:57
3.	"T'Mershi Duween"	December 9 (early show)	1:57
4.	"Dog/Meat (The Dog Breath Variations/Uncle Meat)"	December 9 (early show) / December 10 (late show)	4:14
5.	"RDNZL"	December 9 (early show) + December 10 (early show)	5:03
6.	"Audience Participation – RDNZL"	December 10 (early show)	1:44
7.	"Inca Roads"	December 9 (late show)	8:11
8.	"Echidna's Arf (of You)"	December 9 (late show) + December 10 (late show)	3:55
9.	"Don't You Ever Wash That Thing?"	December 9 (late show) + December 10 (late show)	7:02
10.	"Cheepnis – Percussion"	December 10 (late show)	4:09
11.	"Cheepnis"	December 10 (late show)	5:45
12.	"I'm the Slime"	December 9 (late show)	4:03
13.	"Big Swifty"	December 9 (late show)	8:57
14.	"Be-Bop Tango (of the Old Jazzmen's Church)"	December 9 (late show) + December 10 (late show)	17:32
15.	"End Credits: Don't Eat the Yellow Snow / Father O'Blivion"		3:32
Total length:			95:19

Yes & But Also — More Tracks
No.	Title	Source	Length
1.	"Pygmy Twylyte"	December 10 (late show)	8:35
2.	"The Idiot Bastard Son"	December 10 (late show)	2:27
3.	"Dickie's Such an Asshole"	December 10 (late show)	9:45
Total length:			20:48

Disc two - Roxy — The Soundtrack (CD)
No.	Title	Length
1.	"'Something Terrible Has Happened'"	1:20
2.	"Cosmik Debris"	9:55
3.	"Penguin in Bondage"	8:23
4.	"T'Mershi Duween"	1:57
5.	"Dog/Meat (The Dog Breath Variations/Uncle Meat)"	4:14
6.	"RDNZL"	4:52
7.	"Echidna's Arf (of You)"	3:55
8.	"Don't You Ever Wash That Thing?"	7:03
9.	"Cheepnis - Percussion"	4:08
10.	"Cheepnis"	5:41
11.	"Be-Bop Tango (of the Old Jazzmen's Church)"	17:32
Total length:		68:52

== Personnel ==
- Frank Zappa - lead guitar, vocals, percussion
- Ruth Underwood - percussion
- Ralph Humphrey - drums, percussion
- George Duke - keyboards, synthesizer, vocals
- Tom Fowler - bass
- Bruce Fowler - trombone, dancing (?)
- Napoleon Murphy Brock - tenor sax, flute, lead vocals
- Chester Thompson - drums

== Sources ==
- A little over 21 hours of picture and sound shot in December 1973
