= Bongo Fury =

1975 live and studio album

Live album with studio elements by Frank Zappa and the Mothers with Captain Beefheart
- Released: October 2, 1975
- Recorded: May 20 & 21, 1975 (mostly live) & January 1975 (studio)
- Venues: Armadillo World Headquarters, Austin, Texas, U.S.
- Genres: Blues rock; jazz fusion
- Length: 42:15
- Label: DiscReet
- Producer: Frank Zappa

Frank Zappa chronology
One Size Fits All (1975)	Bongo Fury (1975)	Zoot Allures (1976)
Halloween 78 (2025)	Bongo Fury 50th Anniversary Edition (2026)	Zappa '66 Vol. 1: Live at TTG Studios (2026)

The Mothers of Invention chronology
One Size Fits All (1975)	Bongo Fury (1975)	Playground Psychotics (1992)

Captain Beefheart chronology
Bluejeans & Moonbeams (1974)	Bongo Fury (1975)	Shiny Beast (Bat Chain Puller) (1978)

Professional ratings
Review scores
Source	Rating
AllMusic	3.5/5 stars
Christgau's Record Guide	B
Rolling Stone	(unfavorable)

Bongo Fury is a collaborative album by American experimental rock musicians Frank Zappa, Captain Beefheart, and Zappa's band the Mothers, released in October 1975. It contains material recorded live in concert and in the studio.

The album was the first collaboration between Zappa and Beefheart in about five years due to creative and personal tensions, and was their final major collaboration.

== History ==
Zappa and Beefheart (born Don Van Vliet) met as teenagers in the Antelope Valley region of southern California, and found they shared a love for blues and R&B music and eclectic sensibilities. They had collaborated in the past, notably with Zappa producing Beefheart's album Trout Mask Replica and Beefheart performing the lead vocal on "Willie The Pimp" from Zappa's album Hot Rats (both 1969). They were estranged for a period, but by the mid '70s tensions had cooled enough for them to join forces and tour.

In April 1975, Zappa had a one-sided demo acetate disc cut at Kendun Recorders in Burbank, California. This unreleased disc contains "Revised Music for Guitar and Low-Budget Orchestra", "200 Years Old" and "Regyptian Strut". Zappa's liner notes in the June 1975 album One Size Fits All mention a planned studio follow-up album, which never appeared. Zappa released Bongo Fury instead. The album contains a four minute version of "200 Years Old" which was edited from the one on the April 1975 acetate.

== Overview ==
The album is a notable entry in Zappa's discography, because it was the last to feature a majority of his early 1970s band, which appeared on Over-Nite Sensation (1973), Apostrophe (') (1974), Roxy & Elsewhere (1974), and One Size Fits All (1975). It's also the last album to be released with the Mothers of Invention, which wouldn't release anything else until the 1992 archival album, Playground Psychotics.

Napoleon Murphy Brock's vocals are featured both on the sprawling "Advance Romance" as well as on the three-part harmonies of "Carolina Hard-Core Ecstasy". Captain Beefheart, in his only tour with Zappa's band, delivers vocals and harmonica on several tracks, including his two short prose readings "Sam with the Showing Scalp Flat Top" and "Man with the Woman Head". Bongo Fury also marks the first appearance of Terry Bozzio, who would become Zappa's featured drummer between 1975 and 1978.

The live portions were recorded on May 20 and 21, 1975, at the Armadillo World Headquarters in Austin, Texas. Tracks 5, 6 and the introduction to 9 were recorded in January 1975 during the sessions which produced One Size Fits All and much of Studio Tan.

== Critical reception ==
Reviewing in Christgau's Record Guide: Rock Albums of the Seventies (1981), Robert Christgau wrote: "This sentimental reunion album, recorded (where else?) in Austin with (what else?) additional L.A. studio work, is dismissed by Zappaphiles and 'Fhearthearts alike, but what were they expecting? Perhaps because there's a blues avatar up top, the jazzy music has a soulful integrity, and though it's embarrassing to hear the Captain deliver Frankie's latest pervo exploitations, the rest of the songs are funnier because he's singing them."

A retrospective review from Lindsay Planner of Allmusic ranked Bongo Fury at 3.5 stars out of 5 stars, saying "Most Zappa enthusiasts either love or hate Bongo Fury," with some fans disapproving of Beefheart's vocals or disliking the stylistic shift away from Zappa's jazz-oriented albums of recent years. Nonetheless, Planner stated the album "had something for everyone" with good performances from all contributors.

== Track listing ==
All tracks are written by Frank Zappa, except "Sam with the Showing Scalp Flat Top" and "Man with the Woman Head" by Don Van Vliet.

Side one
No.	Title	Length
1.	"Debra Kadabra"	3:54
2.	"Carolina Hard-Core Ecstasy"	5:59
3.	"Sam with the Showing Scalp Flat Top"	2:51
4.	"Poofter's Froth Wyoming Plans Ahead"	3:03
5.	"200 Years Old"	4:32
Total length:		20:55

Side two
No.	Title	Length
6.	"Cucamonga"	2:24
7.	"Advance Romance"	11:17
8.	"Man with the Woman Head"	1:28
9.	"Muffin Man"	5:34
Total length:		21:20

=== 50th Anniversary Edition ===
Disc one - Original Album
No.	Title	Length

Disc one - Bonus Fury
No.	Title	Length
10.	"Carolina Hard-Core Ecstasy" (Long Version)	8:35
11.	"Man with the Woman Head" (Isolated Vocal)	1:30
12.	"Muffin Man / A Little Green Rosetta" (Alternate Take)	3:37
13.	"200 Years Old" (Long Version)	7:59
14.	"Born to Suck" (Vocal Session Snoop)	9:34
15.	"Born to Suck"	3:44

Disc two - Armadillo World Headquarters – Live in Austin, TX, 20 May, 1975
No.	Title	Length
1.	"5-20-75 Show Start"	3:11
2.	"Put a Shirt on Man"	5:23
3.	"Apostrophe'"	5:57
4.	"Stink-Foot"	6:20
5.	"I'm Not Satisfied"	2:05
6.	"Debra Kadabra"	3:57
7.	"Carolina Hard-Core Ecstasy"	8:27
8.	"The Velvet Sunrise"	6:17
9.	"Pound for a Brown – Part I"	12:48
10.	"Pound for a Brown – Part II"	7:18
11.	"Sleeping in a Jar"	2:22

Disc three - 20 May, 1975 (Continued)
No.	Title	Length
1.	"Enjoy the Steambath"	1:50
2.	"The Torture Never Stops" (Original Version)	11:48
3.	"Camarillo Brillo"	3:54
4.	"Muffin Man"	3:18
5.	"Advance Romance"	12:36
6.	"Montana"	7:31
7.	"Duke's Things"	7:54
8.	"Sam with the Showing Scalp Flat Top"	3:39
9.	"Poofter's Froth Wyoming Plans Ahead"	2:40
10.	"Echidna's Arf (Of You) / Terry's Solo"	2:57
11.	"The Ampeg Mini-Moog Controller Guitar Experiment"	5:26
12.	"Willie the Pimp"	11:06

Disc four - Armadillo World Headquarters, Austin, TX - 21 May, 1975
No.	Title	Length
1.	"Good Evening, Ladies and Gentlemen"	3:58
2.	"Apostrophe'"	4:32
3.	"Stink-Foot"	7:50
4.	"I'm Not Satisfied"	2:02
5.	"Debra Kadabra"	3:59
6.	"Carolina Hard-Core Ecstasy"	9:08
7.	"The Velvet Sunrise"	6:23
8.	"Pound for a Brown – Part I"	11:23
9.	"We've Had a Bomb Threat"	3:13
10.	"Pound for a Brown – Part II"	15:32

Disc five - 21 May, 1975 (Continued)
No.	Title	Length
1.	"Advance Romance"	14:24
2.	"Florentine Pogen"	10:23
3.	"Montana"	8:43
4.	"Camarillo Brillo"	4:02
5.	"Muffin Man"	6:33
6.	"Willie the Pimp"	9:07

Disc five - Afternoon Rehearsal, Bridges Auditorium, Pamona College, Claremont, CA - 10 April 1975
No.	Title	Length
7.	"Claremont Rehearsal"	1:21
8.	"Poofter's Froth Wyoming Plans Ahead"	2:42
9.	"Portuguese Lunar Landing"	9:24

== Personnel ==
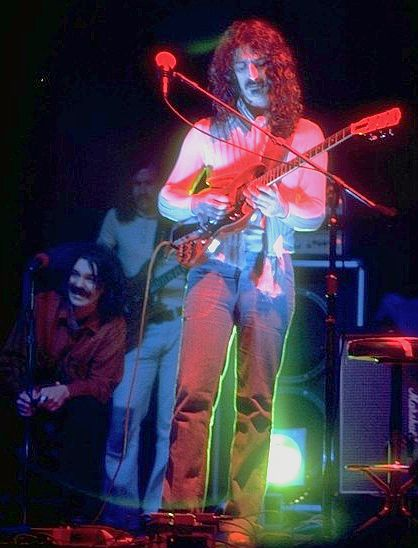
Frank Zappa and Captain Beefheart on stage in New Haven, Connecticut, in 1975

Musicians

- Frank Zappa – lead guitar, lead (2, 5, 6, 9) and backing vocals
- Captain Beefheart – harmonica, lead (1, 3–5, 8, 9) and backing vocals, soprano saxophone, shopping bags
- George Duke – keyboards, lead (2, 7) and backing vocals
- Napoleon Murphy Brock – tenor saxophone, lead (2, 7) and backing vocals
- Bruce Fowler – trombone, fantastic dancing
- Tom Fowler – bass guitar, also dancing
- Denny Walley – slide guitar, backing vocals
- Terry Bozzio – drums, moisture
- Chester Thompson – drums (5, 6)
- Robert "Frog" Camarena – backing vocals on "Debra Kadabra" (uncredited)

Production

- Michael Braunstein – engineer
- Frank Hubach – engineer
- Kelly Kotera – engineer
- Kerry McNabb – engineer
- Davey Moire – engineer
- Cal Schenkel – design
- John Williams – photography, cover photo
- Bob Stone – engineer
- Mike D. Stone of the Record Plant – engineer
- Mark Linett – tour mix engineer
- Paul Hof – tour production manager
- Coy Featherstone – tour lighting designer
- Unity – tour lighting designer

== Charts ==
Chart (1975)	Peak position
Dutch Albums (Album Top 100)	16
Norwegian Albums (VG-lista)	11
Swedish Albums (Sverigetopplistan)	37
US Billboard 200	66

Chart performance for Bongo Fury (50th anniversary edition)
Chart (2026)	Peak position
Austrian Albums (Ö3 Austria)	12
Belgian Albums (Ultratop Flanders)	8
Belgian Albums (Ultratop Wallonia)	53
German Albums (Offizielle Top 100)	8
German Rock & Metal Albums (Offizielle Top 100)	3
Japanese Rock Albums (Oricon)	18
Japanese Western Albums (Oricon)	14
Norwegian Physical Albums (IFPI Norge)	3
Scottish Albums (Official Charts)	11
UK Albums Sales (OCC)	11
UK Rock & Metal Albums (Official Charts)	2
US Top Album Sales (Billboard)	18
