= Joe's Camouflage =

Compilation album by Frank Zappa
- Released: January 30, 2014
- Genre: Progressive rock; hard rock
- Length: 47:54
- Label: VAULTernative Records; Catalog Number: VR 20132
- Producer: Frank Zappa

Frank Zappa chronology
A Token of His Extreme (Soundtrack) (2013)	Joe's Camouflage (2014)	Roxy by Proxy (2014)

Professional ratings
Review scores
Source	Rating

Joe's Camouflage is a compilation album by Frank Zappa, released posthumously in January 2014 by The Zappa Family Trust on Zappa Records. It represents the first official release of material by a band Zappa assembled for rehearsals in the summer of 1975 but which never toured or recorded material in the studio.

== History ==
According to the liner notes, the work comprises cassettes of rehearsals (recorded by Denny Walley) and the analog 4 tracks which Joe Travers transferred and mixed.

== Track listing ==
No.	Title	Length
1.	"Phyniox (Take 1)"	2:29
2.	"T'Mershi Duween"	2:28
3.	"Reeny Ra"	4:13
4.	"Who Do You Think You Are"	1:39
5.	"Slack 'Em All Down"	1:26
6.	"Honey, Don't You Want a Man Like Me?"	4:16
7.	"The Illinois Enema Bandit"	6:27
8.	"Sleep Dirt – In Rehearsal"	1:08
9.	"Black Napkins"	8:12
10.	"Take Your Clothes Off When You Dance"	1:56
11.	"Denny & Froggy Relate"	0:31
12.	"Choose Your Foot"	1:20
13.	"Any Downers?"	6:11
14.	"Phyniox (Take 2)"	4:18
15.	"I Heard a Note"	1:20

== Personnel ==
=== Musicians ===
- Frank Zappa – guitar, vocals
- Denny Walley – guitars, vocals
- Robert "Frog" Camarena – vocals, guitar
- Novi Novog – viola, keyboards, vocals
- Napoleon Murphy Brock – tenor sax, vocals
- Roy Estrada – bass, vocals
- Terry Bozzio – drums

Special mention:

- Andre Lewis – keyboards, vocals

=== Vaultmeisterment ===
- Joe Travers for UMRK
