= Jeff Simmons (musician) =

American rock musician (born 1949)

- Born: Jeffrey Lael Simmons
- Instruments: Bass, guitar, vocals, harmonica, piano

Jeffrey Lael Simmons is an American rock musician, best known as a former member of Frank Zappa's Mothers of Invention.

== Career ==
Simmons provided bass, guitar, vocals and harmonica for The Mothers of Invention during 1970 and 1971. He left the Mothers in early 1971 just prior to the filming of 200 Motels (where he was replaced by Ringo Starr's chauffeur Martin Lickert). Simmons later returned to the Mothers occasionally during the period of 1972 to 1974. Zappa and Mothers albums he appeared on include Chunga's Revenge (1970), Waka/Jawaka (1972) and Roxy & Elsewhere (1974).

In later years Zappa released a number of archival recordings that feature Simmons including You Can't Do That on Stage Anymore, Vol. 1 (1988), You Can't Do That on Stage Anymore, Vol. 6 (1992), Playground Psychotics (1992), and Cheaper Than Cheep (2025). Simmons also appears in the Zappa movies The True Story of Frank Zappa's 200 Motels (1989) and Cheaper Than Cheep: The Movie (2025). Numerous Zappa bootleg recordings from the same era also feature Simmons.

Simmons's music career began in Seattle. In 1967 he became a member of the local group Blues Interchange which soon changed its name to Easy Chair. The group self-financed their only recording, released by the regional Vanco label in 1968. The 12" one-sided, three-song album sold well in the independent record shops along University Way NE (known locally as The Ave) in Seattle's University District. Only about 1000 copies of locally produced Easy Chair record were pressed. It is now a highly valued collectible.

Easy Chair was then booked as the opening act for an August 24, 1968, concert by The Mothers of Invention at the Seattle Center Arena (renamed in 1995 to Mercer Arena). During the sound check Easy Chair was discovered by Zappa, who recognized that the group's style was compatible with his own. The group followed Zappa back to Los Angeles.

In December 1968, Easy Chair was a supporting act for Zappa and The Mothers for two concerts at the Shrine Auditorium. The concerts were organized to showcase Zappa's two new record labels, Bizarre and Straight. Other artists appearing at the shows included Alice Cooper, The GTOs and Wild Man Fischer. But Easy Chair never had the opportunity to make a record in Los Angeles. After disagreements and unexpected delays the group broke up before any recordings were made.

Simmons stayed in Los Angeles and completed two solo albums for Straight in 1969. These were the soundtrack for the Roger Corman biker film Naked Angels and the album Lucille Has Messed My Mind Up. The recording engineer and de facto producer was Chris Huston, formerly with the British band The Undertakers. Also featured were guitarist Craig Tarwater of The Daily Flash and drummer Ron Woods from The Dynamics.

Lucille was recorded at Huston's Mystic Studios at Selma and Vine in Hollywood and finished at Whitney Studios in Burbank. Zappa contributed the title track and co-wrote another while also playing guitar. It was voted the best album on Straight by Mojo Magazine. Both albums were re-issued on CD and vinyl in 2007 by World In Sound Records.

Simmons is one of only a handful of musicians to share songwriting credits with Zappa. The collaboration "Wonderful Wino" appears on Lucille Has Messed My Mind Up, and also on Zappa's 1976 album Zoot Allures. Simmons is also listed as co-writer (with Zappa and Napoleon Murphy Brock) on "Dummy Up" from Zappa's 1974 album Roxy & Elsewhere.

During a 1982 guest DJ spot on UK's BBC Radio 1, Zappa played some of his favorite recordings including Simmons' song "I'm In The Music Business".

Simmons continued to play music with various groups in the Seattle area during the 1970s and 1980s. He appeared in the 1988 movie Rock and Roll Mobster Girls which was produced on video tape in Seattle during the very early stages of the grunge music scene. His most recent work is Blue Universe (2004). It showcases his days and nights in Vancouver B.C., post Hollywood.

== Discography ==
=== Solo ===
- The Original Soundtrack from Naked Angels (1969)
- Lucille Has Messed My Mind Up (1969)
- Blue Universe (2004)

=== with Frank Zappa and The Mothers of Invention ===
- Chunga's Revenge (1970)
- Waka/Jawaka (1972)
- Roxy & Elsewhere (1974)
- You Can't Do That on Stage Anymore, Sampler (1988)
- You Can't Do That on Stage Anymore, Vol. 1 (1988)
- Beat the Boots! (1991)
- You Can't Do That on Stage Anymore, Vol. 6 (1992)
- Playground Psychotics (1992)
- Understanding America (2012)
- Road Tapes, Venue 3 (2016)
- The Roxy Performances (2018)
- The Mothers 1970 (2020)
- Waka/Wazoo (2022)
- Zappa/Erie (2022)
- Over-Nite Sensation (50th Anniversary) (2023)
- 200 Motels - 50th Anniversary (2023)
- Apostrophe - 50th Anniversary (2024)
- Cheaper Than Cheep (2025)
