= You Can't Do That on Stage Anymore, Vol. 2 =

Live album by Frank Zappa
- Released: October 25, 1988
- Recorded: September 22–23, 1974
- Venues: Kulttuuritalo (Helsinki, Finland)
- Genres: Jazz fusion; progressive rock; art rock; comedy rock
- Length: 116:42
- Label: Rykodisc
- Producer: Frank Zappa

Frank Zappa chronology
You Can't Do That on Stage Anymore, Vol. 1 (1988)	You Can't Do That on Stage Anymore, Vol. 2 (1988)	Broadway the Hard Way (1988)

Professional ratings
Review scores
Source	Rating
Allmusic	4.5/5 stars

You Can't Do That on Stage Anymore, Vol. 2 is a live album by Frank Zappa. Despite the subtitle 'The Helsinki Concert', the album is not one complete concert, but was, in fact, assembled from two (and possibly three) different concerts performed in Helsinki in 1974. The working title for this album was The Helsinki Tapes.

Five of the 19 songs are also on Roxy & Elsewhere (1974), which was recorded around the same time, so has some of the same core band personnel. The performance includes a double-speed version of "Village of the Sun", sandwiched between a later version of "RDNZL", the first being recorded in 1972, and "Echidna's Arf (Of You)", and "Montana (Whipping Floss)", in which Zappa alters the lyrics of "Montana" in response to a request from an audience member for the Allman Brothers song "Whipping Post". (Zappa would later add "Whipping Post" to his band's repertoire in response to this request.)

== Track listing ==
=== Compact disc ===
All tracks are written by Frank Zappa, except "Satumaa (Finnish Tango)" by Unto Mononen.

Disc one
No.	Title	Length
1.	"Tush Tush Tush (A Token of My Extreme)"	2:48
2.	"Stinkfoot"	4:18
3.	"Inca Roads"	10:54
4.	"RDNZL"	8:43
5.	"Village of the Sun"	4:33
6.	"Echidna's Arf (Of You)"	3:30
7.	"Don't You Ever Wash That Thing?"	4:56
8.	"Pygmy Twylyte"	8:22
9.	"Room Service"	6:22
10.	"The Idiot Bastard Son"	2:39
11.	"Cheepnis"	4:29

Disc two
No.	Title	Length
1.	"Approximate"	8:11
2.	"Dupree's Paradise"	23:59
3.	"Satumaa (Finnish Tango)"	3:51
4.	"T'Mershi Duween"	1:31
5.	"The Dog Breath Variations"	1:38
6.	"Uncle Meat"	2:28
7.	"Building a Girl"	1:00
8.	"Montana (Whipping Floss)"	10:15
9.	"Big Swifty"	2:17

=== Vinyl ===
Side one
No.	Title	Length
1.	"Tush Tush Tush (A Token of My Extreme)"	2:48
2.	"Stinkfoot"	4:18
3.	"Inca Roads"	10:54
Total length:		18:46

Side two
No.	Title	Length
4.	"RDNZL"	8:43
5.	"Village of the Sun"	4:33
6.	"Echidna's Arf (Of You)"	3:30
7.	"Don't You Ever Wash That Thing?"	4:56
Total length:		22:19

Side three
No.	Title	Length
8.	"Pygmy Twylyte"	8:22
9.	"Room Service"	6:22
10.	"The Idiot Bastard Son"	2:39
11.	"Cheepnis"	4:29
Total length:		22:56

Side four
No.	Title	Length
12.	"Approximate"	8:11
13.	"Dupree's Paradise (Part 1)"	9:57
Total length:		18:39

Side five
No.	Title	Length
14.	"Dupree's Paradise (Part 2)"	14:37
15.	"Satumaa (Finnish Tango)"	3:51
Total length:		18:56

Side six
No.	Title	Length
16.	"T'Mershi Duween"	1:31
17.	"The Dog Breath Variations"	1:38
18.	"Uncle Meat"	2:28
19.	"Building a Girl"	1:00
20.	"Montana (Whipping Floss)"	10:15
21.	"Big Swifty"	2:17
Total length:		20:06

== Personnel ==
=== Musicians ===
- Frank Zappa – lead guitar, vocals
- Napoleon Murphy Brock – saxophone, vocals
- George Duke – keyboards, vocals
- Ruth Underwood – percussion
- Tom Fowler – bass
- Chester Thompson – drums

=== Production ===
- Jukka Teittinen (credited as "unknown") – recording engineer
- Bob Stone – remix engineer; engineering supervision
- Coy Featherstone – lighting director
- "Several hard-core fanatics" – You Can't Do That on Stage Anymore, Vol. 1 and Guitar liner note corrections
- Frank Zappa – arranger, producer, compiler, editor; liner notes
- Art Hotel, Inc. – package design
