= Road Tapes, Venue 3 =

Road Tapes, Venue #3

Live album by Frank Zappa
- Released: May 27, 2016
- Recorded: July 5, 1970 (two shows)
- Venue: Tyrone Guthrie Theater, Minneapolis, MN
- Genre: Rock
- Length: 144:09
- Label: Vaulternative Records; Catalog Number: VR 2016-1
- Producer: Ahmet Zappa, Joe Travers

Frank Zappa chronology
Roxy The Soundtrack (2016)	Road Tapes, Venue #3 (2016)	The Crux Of The Biscuit (2016)

Road Tapes, Venue #3 is a posthumous album of Frank Zappa, released in May 2016, consisting of the recording of the two (early & late) shows on July 5, 1970, at Tyrone Guthrie Theater, Minneapolis, MN. The album was recorded as one of the first shows with the (then) newly formed Mothers of Invention featuring Flo & Eddie, Aynsley Dunbar, George Duke, Jeff Simmons and returning member Ian Underwood. This release is notable for being one of the few tapes in the Zappa Vault from this time period, and line up. It is the ninth installment on the Vaulternative Records label that is dedicated to the posthumous release of complete Zappa concerts, following the releases of FZ:OZ (2002), Buffalo (2007), Wazoo (2007), Philly '76 (2009), Hammersmith Odeon (2010), Carnegie Hall (2011), Road Tapes, Venue #1 (2012) and Road Tapes, Venue #2 (2013).

== Overview ==
The track "Nancy & Mary Music" off the album Chunga's Revenge was made up from the tracks "King Kong/Igor's Boogie" and "The Clap (Chunga's Revenge)". Disc 1, tracks 1–14 make up the 1st show and tracks 15, 16 and all of disc 2 make up the 2nd show.

== Track listing ==
All tracks are written by Frank Zappa, except where noted.

Disc one
No.	Title	Songwriter	Length
1.	"Tyrone Start The Tape"		1:59
2.	"King Kong"		3:37
3.	"Wonderful Wino"	Frank Zappa, Jeff Simmons	4:47
4.	"Concentration Moon"		4:07
5.	"Mom & Dad"		3:25
6.	"The Air"		3:46
7.	"Dog Breath"		2:01
8.	"Mother People"		2:06
9.	"You Didn't Try to Call Me"		4:10
10.	"Agon – Interlude"	Igor Stravinsky	0:36
11.	"Call Any Vegetable"		7:59
12.	"King Kong/Igor's Boogie"		20:25
13.	"It Can't Happen Here"		3:05
14.	"Sharleena"		4:59
15.	"The 23rd "Mondellos""		3:13
16.	"Justine"	Don Harris, Dewey Steven Terry	1:46
Total length:			72:01

Disc two
No.	Title	Length
1.	"Pound for a Brown"	5:07
2.	"Sleeping in a Jar"	3:37
3.	"Sharleena"	5:49
4.	""A Piece of Contemporary Music"" (includes an excerpt of "Caravan" (Duke Ellington, Irving Mills, Juan Tizol))	7:03
5.	"The Return of the Hunchback Duke" (including "The Little House I Used to Live In", "Holiday in Berlin")	10:00
6.	"Cruising for Burgers"	3:44
7.	"Let's Make the Water Turn Black"	1:42
8.	"Harry, You're a Beast"	1:29
9.	"Oh No/Orange County Lumber Truck" (includes an excerpt of "Lucy Lu" (Ray Sharpe))	11:01
10.	"Call Any Vegetable"	11:29
11.	"Mondello's Revenge"	1:46
12.	"The Clap (Chunga's Revenge)"	13:01
Total length:		75:48

== Personnel ==
=== Musicians ===
- Frank Zappa – guitar, vocals
- Howard Kaylan – vocals
- Mark Volman – vocals, tambourine
- Ian Underwood – alto sax, electric piano, organ
- George Duke – electric piano, organ, vocal drum irritations
- Jeff Simmons – bass guitar, vocals
- Aynsley Dunbar – drums

=== Production ===
- Ahmet Zappa – produced for release
- Joe Travers – produced for release, vaultmeisterment & audio transfers
- John Polito – mastering, 2016
- Keith Lawler – layout
- Diva Zappa – photography
- Joseph Carter – original art
