= Zappa's Universe =

1993 Frank Zappa tribute album

Zappa’s Universe

Studio album by various artists
- Released: September 14, 1993
- Recorded: November 7–8, 1991
- Venue: The Ritz, NYC
- Genre: Rock, jazz
- Length: 67:59
- Label: Verve

Zappa's Universe is a 1993 Frank Zappa tribute album featuring alumni from many of Zappa's bands. The music was compiled from a series of concerts from four consecutive nights of concerts at The Ritz in New York City, and filmed for a concert video of the same name. Steve Vai’s cover of the song "Sofa" from the album won a Grammy Award for Best Rock Instrumental Performance in 1994.

== Exposing Zappa’s illness ==
When the Zappa’s Universe project was first underway Frank Zappa was supposed to be part of the project, but by the time of the shows he had become too ill to attend, with his absence leading to speculation about his health in the press. This led Zappa's children, Moon and Dweezil, to publicly confirm their father's prostate cancer for the first time, during a press conference in the fall of 1991. His cancer had been first diagnosed in the spring of 1990.

== Track listing ==
All Songs were written by Frank Zappa

1. "Elvis Has Just Left the Building" – 2:48
2. "Brown Shoes Don’t Make It" – 7:26
3. "The Jazz Discharge Party Hats" – 4:48
4. "Inca Roads" – 9:38
5. "Mōggio" – 2:46
6. "Nite School" – 5:00
7. "Echidna’s Arf (Of You)" – 3:53
8. "Hungry Freaks, Daddy" – 3:28
9. "Heavenly Bank Account" – 4:12
10. "The Meek Shall Inherit Nothing" – 2:54
11. "Waka/Jawaka" – 3:28
12. "Sofa" – 3:51
13. "Dirty Love" – 7:03
14. "Hot Plate Heaven at the Green Hotel" – 6:28

== Personnel ==
=== Musicians ===
- Joel Thome – conductor
- Sal Scarpa – assistant conductor
- The Persuasions – choir
- Rockapella – choir
- Dweezil Zappa – guitar (track 13)
- Steve Vai – guitar (tracks 12, 13)
- Mike Keneally – guitar, keyboards, vocals
- Scott Thunes – bass, vocals
- Dale Bozzio – vocals (track 14)
- Mats Öberg – keyboards, piano, vocals
- Marc Ziegenhagen – keyboards
- Morgan Ågren – drums
- Abe Appleman – violin
- Alvin Rogers – violin
- Joyce Hammann – violin
- Ming Yeh – violin
- Peter Vanderwater – violin
- Sandra Billingstea – violin
- Sanford Allen – violin
- Sheila Reinhold – violin
- Stan Hunte – violin
- Al Brown – viola
- John Dexter – viola
- Richard Spencer – viola
- Bruce Wang – cello
- Fred Zlotkin – cello
- John Beal – double bass
- Cynthia Otis – harp
- Marvin Stamm – trumpet, flugelhorn
- Ron Sell – horn
- Jim Pugh – trombone
- Dave Taylor – bass trombone, tuba
- Virgil Blackwell – clarinet, bass clarinet
- Dave Tofani – flute, piccolo, soprano saxophone
- Robert Magnuson – oboe, alto saxophone
- John Campo – bassoon, tenor saxophone
- Roger Rosenberg – baritone saxophone
- Jonathan Haas – percussion

==== The Persuasions ====
- Jay Otis Washington
- Jerry Lawson
- Jimmy Hayes
- Joe Russell

==== Rockapella ====
- Barry Carl
- Elliot Kerman
- Scott Leonard
- Sean Altman

=== Production staff ===
- Virgil Blackwell – music coordinator
- Walt Taylor – production manager
- James Badrak – stage manager
- Mitch Keller – lighting
- Dave "Pops" Clements – guitar tech

=== Record production ===
- Produced (sort of) by Davitt Sigerson
- Executive producer and album compilation by Guy Eckstine
- Recorded by David Hewitt
- Mixed by Carl Beatty
