= A Token of His Extreme =

A Token of His Extreme (Soundtrack)

Live album by Frank Zappa
- Released: November 25, 2013
- Recorded: August 27, 1974
- Venues: KCET (Los Angeles, CA)
- Genres: Progressive rock, hard rock
- Length: 77:23
- Labels: Zappa Records; Catalog Number: ZR 20015
- Producer: Frank Zappa

Frank Zappa chronology
Road Tapes, Venue #2 (2013)	A Token of His Extreme (Soundtrack) (2013)	Joe's Camouflage (2014)

A Token of His Extreme (Soundtrack) is a live album by American musician Frank Zappa, recorded on August 27, 1974, at the KCET TV studios in Los Angeles, California. It is the audio portion of Zappa's TV special of the same name. The TV program was only rarely seen during its original 1974 broadcasts. The entire video program was later released posthumously on DVD in 2013.

The CD soundtrack recording was also released in November 2013 by the Zappa Family Trust on Zappa Records. The CD appeared five months after the DVD.

== Track listing ==
No.	Title	Length
1.	"The Dog Breath Variations / Uncle Meat"	4:02
2.	"Montana"	6:44
3.	"Earl of Duke"	5:49
4.	"Florentine Pogen"	11:08
5.	"Stinkfoot"	3:58
6.	"Pygmy Twylyte"	7:47
7.	"Room Service"	12:12
8.	"Inca Roads"	9:51
9.	"Oh No / Son of Orange County"	7:10
10.	"More Trouble Every Day"	7:17
11.	"A Token of My Extreme"	1:25

== Personnel ==
=== Musicians ===
- Frank Zappa – guitar, vocals, percussion
- Napoleon Murphy Brock – tenor saxophone, flute, vocals
- George Duke – keyboards, vocals
- Tom Fowler – bass guitar
- Chester Thompson – drums
- Ruth Underwood – marimba, vibraphone, percussion

=== Sources ===
- 1974 Stereo Analog Master
