= Sofa (Frank Zappa song) =

"Du Bist Mein Sofa"

Single by Frank Zappa and The Mothers of Invention

from the album One Size Fits All
- B-side: "Stink-Foot"
- Released: August 8th, 1975
- Recorded: December 1974
- Genre: Progressive rock, experimental rock, jazz fusion
- Length: 2:38
- Label: Warner Bros.
- Songwriter: Frank Zappa
- Producer: Frank Zappa

Frank Zappa singles chronology
"Don't Eat The Yellow Snow" (1974)	"Du Bist Mein Sofa" (1975)	"Find Her Finer" (1976)

"Sofa" is a composition by American musician Frank Zappa, first released in 1975 on the album One Size Fits All. It is one of the most popular and frequently referenced Zappa songs.

The song lyrics combine lines in both German and English. "Sofa" was, in part, a result of Zappa's fascination with the German people as he toured in Europe.

In 1993, the year of Zappa's death, Steve Vai played "Sofa" for Zappa's tribute album Zappa's Universe. The recording won a Grammy Award for Best Rock Instrumental Performance in 1994. This was the first of Vai's three Grammy Awards.

== Appearances ==
"Sofa" was originally played in concert on Zappa's 1971 tour with Flo and Eddie. It formed part of a longer suite of songs which included a storyline where singer Mark Volman pretends to be a sofa. The suite was also referred to as "Divan" on the album Playground Psychotics, recorded in 1970-1971 and released in 1992.

The song is represented by a drawing of a sofa on the cover of the 1975 studio album One Size Fits All. The album's initials, "OSFA", can be re-arranged to spell "SOFA". The song appeared in an instrumental version ("Sofa No. 1") and a vocal version ("Sofa No. 2"). In the same year, "Sofa No. 2" was released as a single in Germany with the title "Du bist mein Sofa". The arrangements on this album prominently feature George Duke on piano and vocals.

A new arrangement of the instrumental "Sofa No. 1", now titled simply "Sofa", was recorded in 1976 and featured on the live album Zappa in New York. This version features Michael Brecker on saxophone.

Zappa's 1988 album You Can't Do That on Stage Anymore, Vol. 1, contains live 1971 and 1982 recordings of the song and the titles are switched. On this release "Sofa #1" is a vocal version and "Sofa #2" is the instrumental.

== Lyrics and meaning ==
The vocal versions of "Sofa" contain bilingual lyrics. According to critics, because it contains German it stood out the most on the album. The English lyrics sing about being various parts of nature (the heavens, the water, the clouds), while the lyrics in German explain how they are "the sofa's chrome dinette" and "all days and all nights".

== Ya Hozna ==
"Ya Hozna", from the 1984 album Them or Us, includes vocal parts from "Sofa No.2" played backwards. It also contains parts of "Lonely Little Girl" (from We're Only in It for the Money) and unused material from "Valley Girl" (from Ship Arriving Too Late to Save a Drowning Witch) played backwards.

== Single track list ==
7"

A. "Du bist mein Sofa" - 2:38
B. "Stink-Foot" - 4:25
