= Jamie Kime =

American guitarist

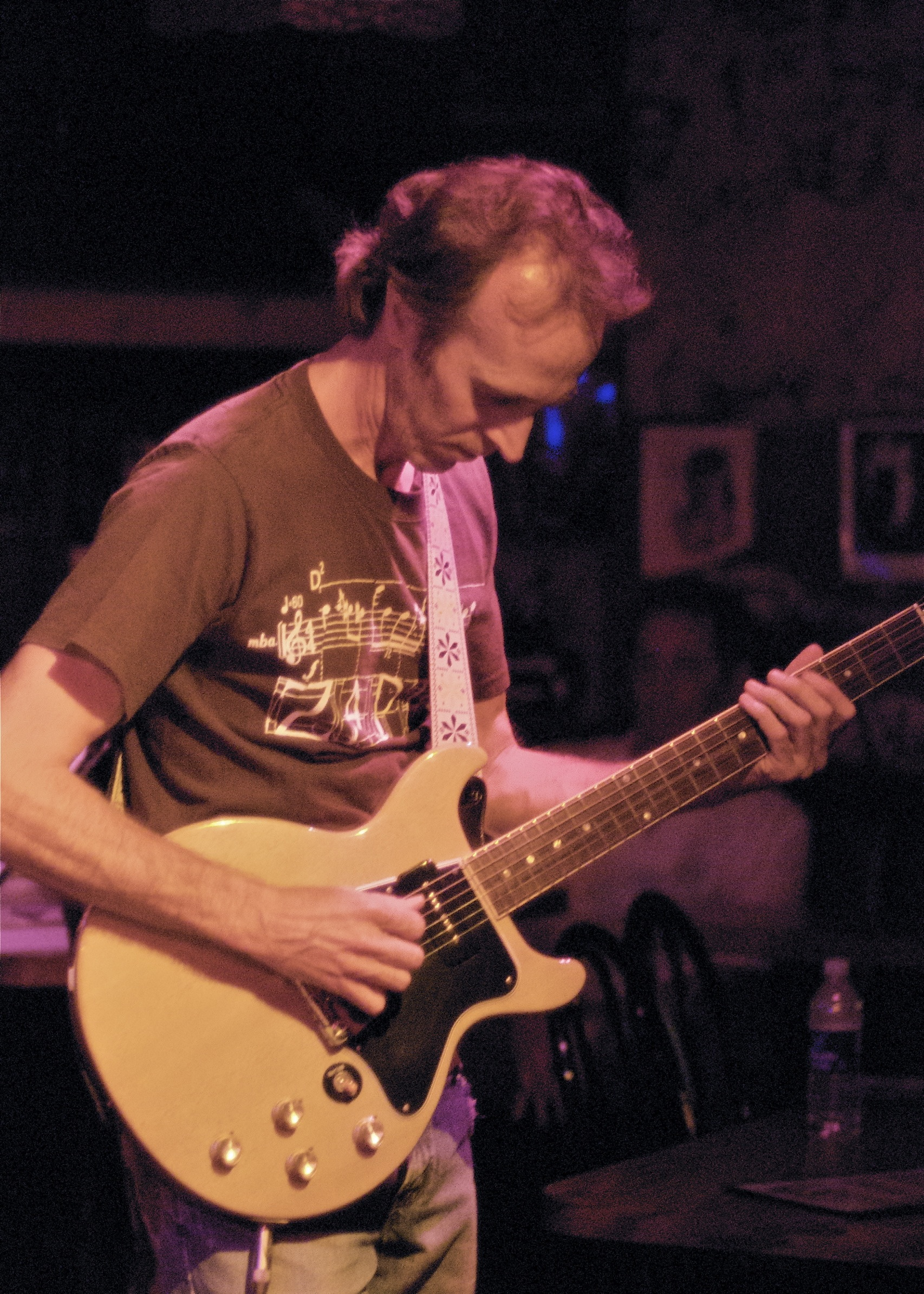
- Jamie Kime performing at the Baked Potato

Background information
- Occupation: Musician
- Instrument: Guitar

Jamie Kime is an American guitarist who has worked with Michelle Branch, Jewel, and as a member of the Zappa Plays Zappa world tour.

Kime attended the Musicians Institute in Hollywood, California, training under guitarists such as Peter Sprague and Ted Greene. He then began a performance and recording career that culminated in his rhythm guitar duties on the Zappa Plays Zappa tour. Concert reviewers have noted Kime's positive addition to songs on the tour. As a member of the Zappa Plays Zappa ensemble, Kime won a 2009 Best Rock Instrumental Performance Grammy Award for the group's recording of "Peaches en Regalia".

Kime is also a members of The Zappa Band, an alumni band consisting of former Frank Zappa contributors, vocalist/guitarist Ray White, keyboardist/guitarist/vocalist Mike Keneally, multi-instrumentalist Robert Martin, bassist Scott Thunes and drummer Joe Travers.
