= Air Pocket (band) =

Air Pocket was a jazz fusion band founded by the Fowler brothers.

Their debut album was arranged by Oliver Nelson. It was released on LP in 1976 and CD in 2002, both by East Wind.

== Discography ==
- 1976: Fly On (East Wind)
- 1985: Hunter
- 1988: Breakfast for Dinosaurs

== Personnel ==
- Walt Fowler - trumpet, miraphon
- Bruce Fowler - trombone
- Steve Fowler - alto saxophone, flute
- Albert Wing - soprano saxophone, tenor saxophone
- Mike Miller - guitar
- Stu Goldberg - piano, electric piano, mini-moog, clavinet
- Ed Fowler - electric bass
- Tom Fowler - electric bass
- Chester Thompson - drums
