= Ruth Underwood =

American xylophone, marimba and vibraphone player (born 1946)

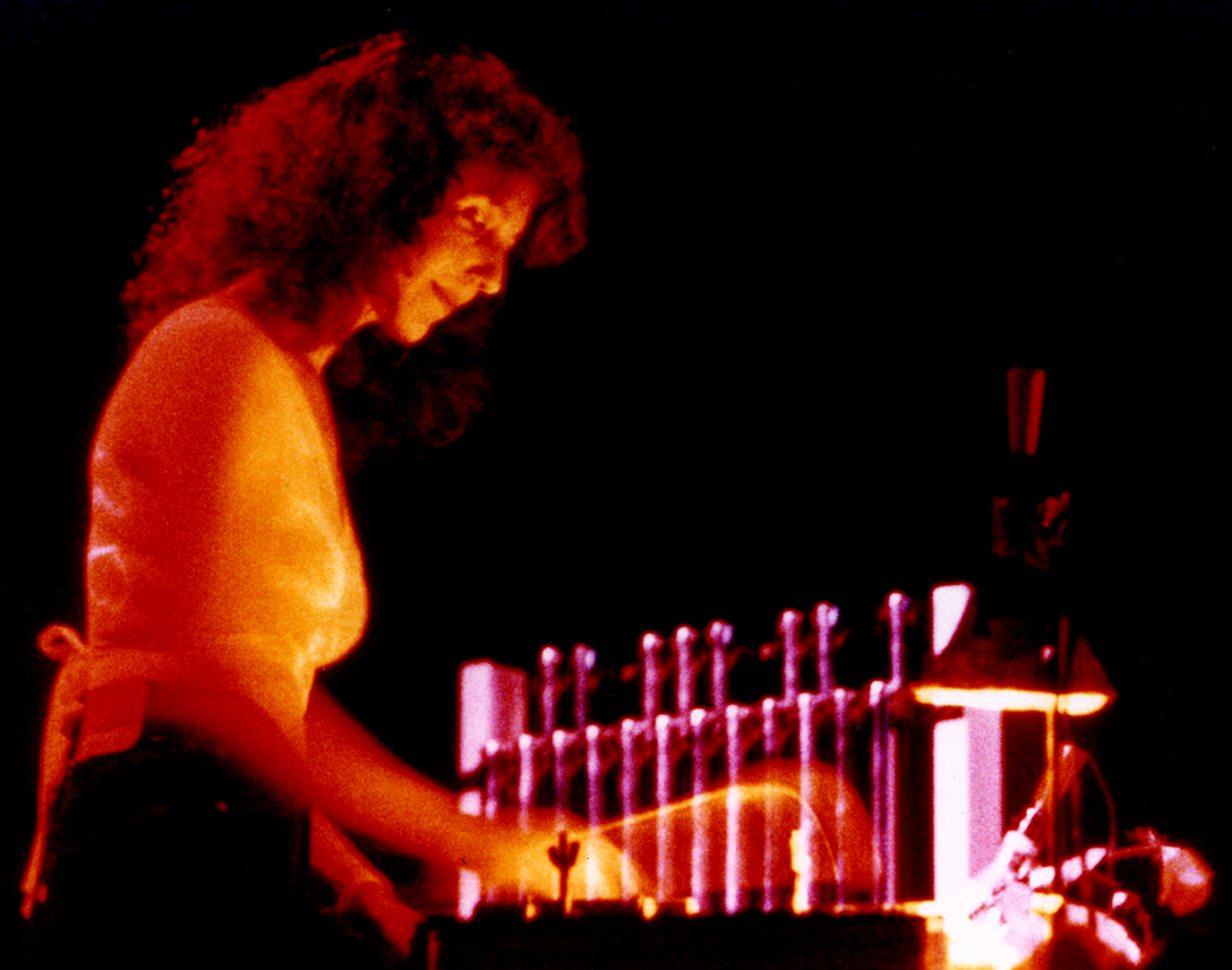
- Underwood playing at a Frank Zappa concert, c. 1975

Background information
- Born: Ruth Komanoff; 23 May 1946 (age 80)
- Genre: Jazz-rock/rock
- Occupations: Musician, composer
- Instruments: Xylophone, marimba, vibraphone, piano, synthesizer
- Years active: 1967–1982
- Labels: Philips Records, Bell Records, DiscReet Records
- Formerly of: The Mothers of Invention

Ruth Underwood (née Komanoff; May 23, 1946) is an American musician best known for playing xylophone, marimba, vibraphone, and other percussion instruments for Frank Zappa and his band The Mothers of Invention. She played for Zappa from 1968 until the mid-1970s, and again briefly before Zappa's death in 1993. She married fellow Zappa musician Ian Underwood.

== Background ==
Underwood began her music training in the classical tradition, studying both at Ithaca College under Warren Benson and at Juilliard under Saul Goodman (timpani) and Morris Goldenberg (percussion). Throughout 1967, she kept a regular attendance at the Garrick Theater in New York City when Frank Zappa and The Mothers of Invention were the resident band. This resulted in her association with Zappa, beginning in December 1967.

Oh, I was probably one of those rather stiff people from the suburbs – I think some of us did understand, and we kept coming back for more, and more, and more. I remember being very upset when they finally finished their stint at the Garrick Theatre and went back to L.A. I felt as if the real heart had gone out of New York City, and I had to get back on with my conservatory music training life, which seemed very dull after this.

In May 1969 she married keyboardist/saxophonist Ian Underwood, a fellow Zappa musician. They divorced in 1986. Professionally she used both her birth name, Ruth Komanoff, and her married name.

== Career ==
=== Hamilton Face Band ===
Underwood was the drummer with a rock group named the Hamilton Face Band during 1969, appearing on their recordings released by Philips Records and Bell Records. The first album, The Hamilton Face Band was produced by Anne Tansey. The group felt that they were rushed and weren't happy with it. However, the second one that was produced by Johanan Vigoda brought them some chart success.

=== Further activities ===
Underwood performed in more than 30 recordings with Zappa or Mothers. Examples of her virtuosity can be heard on tracks including the "Rollo Interior interlude" from "St. Alfonzo's Pancake Breakfast" on the Apostrophe (') album (1974). Other work is documented on Roxy & Elsewhere (1974) and on "Inca Roads", the opening track on One Size Fits All (1975). Underwood can be heard (though not seen) in the soundtrack of the Zappa movie 200 Motels (1971), and the Dub Room Special DVD (1982), which includes performances from the KCET Special A Token Of His Extreme. She also features in the film of the Roxy performances (2015).

During the 1970s, Underwood collaborated in recording sessions for a small number of other performers, most notably with the band Ambrosia, composer Jasun Martz, and jazz keyboardist George Duke, the last also a veteran of Zappa's bands.

In an interview Underwood revealed that she played on one final session for Zappa shortly before his death from cancer in December 1993. Zappa was then composing mostly with the electronic Synclavier system, though he used recordings of live musicians which were later manipulated and arranged with the Synclavier. She recalled:

A couple of years ago, when I heard that Frank was ill, I called him up. For 14 years we had no contact at all. He invited me to the house and we enjoyed some really nice visits with each other. Last June ('93) he called and asked if he could sample some of my stuff. I was shocked because I hadn't touched a pair of mallets since March of '77. I ended up practicing for 14 hours, which was all the time I could get together in the context of my life now. I spent four days at Frank's house sampling. This was really a miracle for me – that I could be reunited with him and still have something to offer.

In 2008, she commissioned Gordon Stout to write a work for the percussion ensemble Nexus.

She also features in the DVD - DC Collection: Vol. 1 - The Drummers Of Frank Zappa (2009) with Terry Bozzio, Ralph Humphrey, Chester Thompson and Chad Wackerman.

Underwood is the mother of two children, both musicians. She resides in Los Angeles.

== Selected discography ==
=== Frank Zappa ===
- Uncle Meat (1969)
- 200 Motels (1971)
- Over-Nite Sensation (1973)
- Apostrophe (') (1974)
- Roxy & Elsewhere (1974)
- One Size Fits All (1975)
- Zoot Allures (1976)
- Zappa in New York (1978)
- Studio Tan (1978)
- Sleep Dirt (1979)
- Thing-Fish (1984)
- You Can't Do That on Stage Anymore Sampler (1988)
- You Can't Do That on Stage Anymore, Vol. 1 (1988)
- You Can't Do That on Stage Anymore, Vol. 2 (1988)
- You Can't Do That on Stage Anymore, Vol. 3 (1989)
- You Can't Do That on Stage Anymore, Vol. 4 (1991)
- You Can't Do That on Stage Anymore, Vol. 6 (1992)
- The Lost Episodes (1996)
- Läther (1996)
- Frank Zappa Plays the Music of Frank Zappa: A Memorial Tribute (1996)
- Have I Offended Someone? (1997)
- The Dub Room Special (2007)
- Wazoo (2007)
- One Shot Deal (2008)
- Understanding America (2012)
- Road Tapes, Venue #2 (2013)
- A Token of His Extreme Soundtrack (2013)
- Roxy by Proxy (2014)
- Roxy the Soundtrack (2015)
- The Crux of the Biscuit (2016)
- Meat Light (2016)
- The Roxy Performances (2018)
- Halloween 73 (2019)
- Zappa (2020)

=== The Hamilton Face Band ===
- The Hamilton Face Band (1969)
- Ain't Got No Time (1970)

=== Jasun Martz and the Neoteric Orchestra ===
- The Pillory (1978)

=== George Duke ===
- I Love The Blues She Heard My Cry (1975)
- Liberated Fantasies (1976)
- My Soul: The Complete MPS Fusion Recordings (2008)

=== Billy Cobham ===
- Inner Conflicts (1978)

=== Ambrosia ===
- Somewhere I've Never Travelled (1976)

=== Alphonso Johnson ===
- Yesterday's Dreams (1976)

=== Eye to Eye ===
- Eye to Eye (1982)

=== Jasun Martz/The Neoteric Orchestra ===
- The Pillory (1981)

=== Malcolm McNab ===
- Exquisite (2006)

== Movie appearances ==
- Zappa
- Roxy: The Movie
- 200 Motels
- Baby Snakes
- The Dub Room Special
- The Amazing Mr. Bickford
- Video From Hell
- The True Story of Frank Zappa's 200 Motels
- A Token of His Extreme
- Cheaper Than Cheep
