= You Can't Do That on Stage Anymore, Vol. 1 =

Live album by Frank Zappa
- Released: May 16, 1988
- Recorded: 1969–1984
- Genres: Hard rock; progressive rock; art rock; comedy rock
- Length: 137:23
- Label: Rykodisc
- Producer: Frank Zappa

Frank Zappa chronology
Guitar (1988)	You Can't Do That on Stage Anymore, Vol. 1 (1988)	You Can't Do That on Stage Anymore, Vol. 2 (1988)

Singles from You Can't Do That on Stage Anymore, Vol. 1
- 1. "Zomby Woof" Released: 1988

Professional ratings
Review scores
Source	Rating
AllMusic	4.5/5 stars

You Can't Do That on Stage Anymore, Vol. 1 is a double disc live album by Frank Zappa released in 1988 (see 1988 in music) on the Rykodisc label. It was the first of a series of six double CDs of live performances spanning Zappa's career.

Shortly before the CD release, Zappa released You Can't Do That on Stage Anymore, Sampler, a double LP with almost identical artwork to the Vol. 1 CD, the only difference being the word "Sampler" in place of "Vol. 1", and featuring select tracks from the series. The liner notes to the second volume included some corrections to the date information of the first volume that Zappa received from fans, and further corrections and additions have come since then using available recordings.

== Track listing ==
All tracks are written by Frank Zappa, except where noted.

Disc one
No.	Title	Recording date and venue	Length
1.	"The Florida Airport Tape" (Kaylan, Volman, Zappa)	An airport in Florida, June 1970	1:03
2.	"Once Upon a Time"	Rainbow Theatre, December 10, 1971	4:37
3.	"Sofa #1"	Rainbow Theatre, December 10, 1971	2:53
4.	"The Mammy Anthem"	La Patinoire des Vernets, July 1, 1982; Stadio Communale, July 14, 1982	5:41
5.	"You Didn't Try to Call Me"	Olympiahalle, July 3, 1980	3:39
6.	"Diseases of the Band"	Hammersmith Odeon, February 19, 1979	2:22
7.	"Tryin' to Grow a Chin"	Hammersmith Odeon, February 18, 1979, 2nd show	3:44
8.	"Let's Make the Water Turn Black/Harry, You're a Beast/The Orange County Lumber Truck"	The Ballroom, February 16, 1969	3:27
9.	"The Groupie Routine"	Pauley Pavilion, August 7, 1971	5:41
10.	"Ruthie-Ruthie" (Berry, Brock)	Capitol Theatre, November 8, 1974	2:57
11.	"Babbette"	Capitol Theatre, November 8, 1974	3:35
12.	"I'm the Slime"	The Roxy, December 8–10, 1973	3:13
13.	"Big Swifty"	The Roxy, December 8–10, 1973	8:46
14.	"Don't Eat the Yellow Snow/Nanook Rubs It/St. Alphonzo's Pancake Breakfast/Father O'Blivion/Rollo"	Hammersmith Odeon, February 18, 1979, 2nd show	20:16
Total length:			71:54

Disc two
No.	Title	Recording date and venue	Length
15.	"Plastic People" (Berry, Zappa)	The Factory, February 13, 1969	4:38
16.	"The Torture Never Stops"	Hemmerleinhalle, February 25, 1978	15:48
17.	"Fine Girl"	Parco Redecesio, July 7, 1982	2:55
18.	"Zomby Woof"	Parco Redecesio, July 7, 1982; Hammersmith Odeon, London, UK June 19, 1982; late show (guitar solo)	5:39
19.	"Sweet Leilani" (Owens)	The Ballroom, February 16, 1969	2:39
20.	"Oh No"	The Ballroom, February 16, 1969	4:34
21.	"Be in My Video"	The Pier, August 26, 1984	3:29
22.	"The Deathless Horsie"	The Pier, August 26, 1984	5:29
23.	"The Dangerous Kitchen"	The Pier, August 26, 1984	1:49
24.	"Dumb All Over"	The Palladium, October 31, 1981; early show	4:20
25.	"Heavenly Bank Account"	The Palladium, October 31, 1981; early show	4:05
26.	"Suicide Chump"	The Palladium, October 31, 1981; early show	4:55
27.	"Tell Me You Love Me"	Stadio Comunale, July 8, 1982	2:09
28.	"Sofa #2"	Stadio Comunale, July 8, 1982	3:00
Total length:			65:29

== Personnel ==
- Frank Zappa – engineer, keyboards, vocals, producer, main performer, guitar
- Mark Volman – vocals (tracks 1—3, 9)
- Howard Kaylan – vocals (tracks 1—3, 9)
- Chad Wackerman – drums, vocals (tracks 4, 17, 18, 21—28)
- Ike Willis – guitar, vocals (tracks 5—7, 14, 21—23)
- Lowell George – guitar, vocals (tracks 8, 15, 19, 20)
- Ray White – guitar, vocals (tracks 4, 5, 17, 18, 21—28)
- Adrian Belew – guitar, vocals (track 16)
- Warren Cuccurullo – guitar, organ (tracks 6, 7, 14)
- Ian Underwood – wind, keyboards (tracks 8, 15, 19, 20)
- Steve Vai – guitar (tracks 4, 17, 18, 24—28)
- Dweezil Zappa – guitar
- Denny Walley – slide guitar, vocals (tracks 6, 7, 14)
- Scott Thunes – bass guitar, synthesizer, vocals (tracks 4, 17, 18, 21—28)
- Jim Pons – bass guitar, vocals (tracks 1—3, 9)
- Roy Estrada – bass guitar, vocals (tracks 8, 15, 19, 20)
- Jeff Simmons – bass guitar
- Tom Fowler – bass guitar (tracks 10—13)
- Patrick O'Hearn – wind, bass guitar (track 16)
- Arthur Barrow – keyboards, bass guitar (tracks 5—7, 14)
- Peter Wolf – keyboards (tracks 6, 7, 14, 16)
- Allan Zavod – keyboards (tracks 21—23)
- Don Preston – keyboards (tracks 8, 15, 19, 20)
- Ruth Underwood – percussion (tracks 10—13)
- Bobby Martin – keyboards, vocals, saxophone (tracks 4, 17, 18, 21—28)
- Tommy Mars – keyboards, vocals (tracks 4—7, 14, 16—18, 24—28)
- George Duke – keyboards, vocals (tracks 10—13)
- Motorhead Sherwood – baritone saxophone (tracks 8, 15, 19, 20)
- Napoleon Murphy Brock – saxophone, vocals (tracks 10—13)
- Bunk Gardner – tenor saxophone, trumpet (tracks 8, 15, 19, 20)
- Bruce Fowler – trombone (tracks 12, 13)
- Vinnie Colaiuta – drums (tracks 6, 7, 14)
- Ralph Humphrey – drums (tracks 12, 13)
- Art Tripp – drums (tracks 8, 15, 19, 20)
- David Logerman – drums (track 5)
- Aynsley Dunbar – drums (tracks 2, 3, 9)
- Terry Bozzio – drums (track 16)
- Chester Thompson – drums (tracks 10—13)
- Jimmy Carl Black – drums, percussion (tracks 8, 15, 19, 20)
- Ed Mann – percussion (tracks 4, 6, 7, 14, 16—18, 24—28)
