= Roxy & Elsewhere =

Live album by Frank Zappa / The Mothers
- Released: September 10, 1974
- Recorded: December 8, 9 & 10, 1973; May 8 & 11, 1974
- Venue: The Roxy Theatre (Hollywood, California); Edinboro State College (Edinboro, Pennsylvania); Auditorium Theatre (Chicago, Illinois)
- Genre: Jazz fusion; progressive rock; hard rock
- Length: 70:17
- Label: DiscReet
- Producer: Frank Zappa

Frank Zappa chronology
Apostrophe(') (1974)	Roxy & Elsewhere (1974)	One Size Fits All (1975)

The Mothers of Invention chronology
Over-Nite Sensation (1973)	Roxy & Elsewhere (1974)	One Size Fits All (1975)

Professional ratings
Review scores
Source	Rating
Allmusic	4/5 stars
Christgau's Record Guide	C+
Rolling Stone	(unfavorable)
DownBeat	3.5/5 stars

Roxy & Elsewhere is a double live album by Frank Zappa and The Mothers, released on September 10, 1974. Most of the songs were recorded on December 8, 9 and 10, 1973 at The Roxy Theatre in Hollywood, California.

== Overview ==
The material taken from the Roxy concerts was later amended with some overdubs in the studio, while the "Elsewhere" tracks ("Son of Orange County" and "More Trouble Every Day") were recorded on May 8, 1974, at the Edinboro State College, Edinboro, Pennsylvania (and parts of "Son of Orange County" on May 11, 1974, at the Auditorium Theatre in Chicago, Illinois [late show]) and do not contain overdubbed material.

== History ==
=== Album ===
The album primarily comprised recordings from three shows at the Roxy Theater in Hollywood, and featured tracks never before or thereafter released on any Zappa/Mothers album.

The opening track, "Penguin in Bondage", is edited together from performances at the Roxy and the Chicago date with the guitar solo derived from the 12-8-73 sound check / film shoot. The guitar solo on "Son of Orange County" is one of the few Zappa guitar solos edited together from more than one concert, in this case the Edinboro and Chicago dates.

Some of the unused tracks from the Roxy shows circulate as bootlegs, as well as the entirety of the Edinboro show. Other tracks were released on Volumes One, Three and Four of the You Can't Do That on Stage Anymore series. On a side note, Zappa can be heard, on the released and unreleased Roxy tapes, speaking of the making of a 'film' that could potentially be "broadcast on television", as well as reminding the audience not to be "uncomfortable around the intimidatingly large 16 mm cameras."

A four-channel quadraphonic version of the album was mixed by Zappa and advertised, but the quad version has never been released.

The 2014 CD Roxy by Proxy includes other material from the Roxy shows, including alternate versions of some songs from Roxy & Elsewhere, with no overdubs.

In the documentary Genesis: Together and Apart, Phil Collins states that the twin drum solos in "Don't You Ever Wash That Thing?" is what inspired him to ask Chester Thompson to become Genesis' touring drummer in late 1976. Collins and Thompson also used the drum fill from the chorus of "More Trouble Every Day" in the coda of live versions of the Genesis song "Afterglow."

On February 2, 2018, Zappa Records/UMe released The Roxy Performances, a definitive set that collects all four public shows from December 9–10, 1973, and the December 8th film shoot and soundcheck, each presented in their entirety without overdubs, along with bonus content featuring rarities from a rehearsal, unreleased tracks and highlights from the recording session at Bolic Sound.

On June 17, 2022, Zappa Records/UMe released Zappa/Erie, a six CD box set including the complete May 8, 1974 concert from Edinboro that had been one of the sources of "Son of Orange County" and "More Trouble Every Day" from Roxy & Elsewhere.

=== Film ===
There was a three-minute trailer released in the new millennium advertising a Roxy DVD, which could potentially contain the footage from all three nights. The trailer was later included on the Baby Snakes DVD as a bonus feature.

Joe Travers has stated that "It's sitting in the vault. Waiting for a budget to do it properly. Basically the film footage, the negatives were transferred by Frank in the '80s using '80s technology. What we want to do is go back to the original negatives and do it in High Definition and then create a 5.1 mix from the original masters so that we have surround sound as well as Frank's 2 channel stereo mix. Once we get all that together, then we need to cut the program. Edit the program together, camera angles, what shows, what we are going to include from what shows or include all the shows. I have no idea what Dweezil and Gail want to do. It's great stuff, but the process of just getting to that point is going to cost a lot of money and take a lot of time." Two songs from the unreleased film ("Montana" and "Dupree's Paradise") were used as opener for the Zappa Plays Zappa concerts in 2006.

On April 1, 2007, Zappa.com unveiled a redesigned website, which included the 30-minute segment from the Roxy performances, which had been used at the Zappa Plays Zappa concerts, on its new videos page.

The clip for "Montana" was included as a bonus feature of the Classic Albums: Apostrophe(')/Over-Nite Sensation DVD, which was released on May 1, 2007.

The Blu-ray Roxy: The Movie was released in October 2015. It includes some of the takes released on Roxy & Elsewhere and others from Roxy by Proxy, revealing some editing that went into those releases. (For instance, the second half of Zappa's "Be-Bop Tango" intro mostly matches Roxy & Elsewhere while the first half is different.)

== Track listing ==
All tracks are written by Frank Zappa; "Dummy Up" co-written with Napoleon Murphy Brock and Jeff Simmons. Original LP editions separated Zappa's vocal introductions at the start of each side; these were each listed as "Preamble". When the album was reissued on CD, these were combined as the first tracks on each side, as displayed below.

Side one
No.	Title	Recording venue and date	Length
1.	"Penguin in Bondage"	The Roxy, Dec 8 and Dec 10, 1973 (early & late shows); Auditorium Theater, May 11, 1974 (early & late shows)	6:48
2.	"Pygmy Twylyte"	The Roxy, Dec 8, 1973	2:13
3.	"Dummy Up"	The Roxy, Dec 8, 1973	6:02
Total length:			15:03

Side two
No.	Title	Recording venue and date	Length
4.	"Village of the Sun"	The Roxy, Dec 9 (late show) and Dec 10, 1973 (late show)	4:17
5.	"Echidna's Arf (of You)"	The Roxy, Dec 10, 1973 (late show)	3:52
6.	"Don't You Ever Wash That Thing?"	The Roxy, Dec 9 (late show) and Dec 10, 1973 (late show)	9:40
Total length:			18:22

Side three
No.	Title	Recording venue and date	Length
7.	"Cheepnis"	The Roxy, Dec 10, 1973 (late show) and Bolic Sound Studio, Dec 12, 1973	6:33
8.	"Son of Orange County"	Edinboro State College, May 8, 1974; Auditorium Theater, May 11, 1974	5:53
9.	"More Trouble Every Day"	Edinboro State College, May 8, 1974	6:00
Total length:			18:26

Side four
No.	Title	Recording venue and date	Length
10.	"Be-Bop Tango (Of the Old Jazzmen's Church)"	The Roxy, Dec 10, 1973	16:41
Total length:			70:17

== Personnel ==
=== Musicians ===
- Frank Zappa – lead guitar, vocals
- George Duke – keyboards, synthesizer, vocals
- Tom Fowler – bass
- Ruth Underwood – percussion
- Jeff Simmons – rhythm guitar, vocals
- Don Preston – synthesizer
- Bruce Fowler – trombone, dancing (?)
- Walt Fowler – trumpet
- Napoleon Murphy Brock – tenor sax, flute, lead vocals
- Ralph Humphrey – drums
- Chester Thompson – drums
- Additional back-up vocals on "Cheepnis" by Debbie Wilson, Linda "Lynn" Sims, Ruben Ladron de Guevara, George Duke & Robert "Frog" Camarena

=== Production ===
- Frank Zappa – producer
- Cal Schenkel – design & graphics
- Sherwin Tilton - cover photography, liner photography
- Coy Featherston – liner photography
- Steve Magedoff – liner photography
- Herb Cohen – DiscReetion
- Wally Heider – Roxy remote recording
- Kerry McNabb – Roxy remote recording engineer, remixing
- Bill Hennigh – road tapes engineer
- Stephen Marcussen – digital remastering, 1990

== Charts ==
Chart (1974)	Peak position
US Top LPs & Tape (Billboard)	27
