= Montana (Frank Zappa song) =

Song by Frank Zappa and The Mothers

from the album Over-Nite Sensation
- Recorded: March 20 and May 26, 1973
- Length: 6:35
- Songwriter(s): Frank Zappa

"Montana" is a song composed by Frank Zappa for his 1973 LP Over-Nite Sensation. The last track on the album is one of Zappa's most famous and renowned compositions. It features backing vocals by Tina Turner and the Ikettes throughout the entire track, notably on the middle and ending sections.

The single version of this track was released as the B-side of "I'm the Slime" in 1973. Both songs are different mixes and edits than the album versions. The single version of "Montana" later appeared on the compilation Strictly Commercial.

== Song structure ==
The structure of "Montana" is intro–verses–chorus–solo–middle section–verses–outro. The lyrics, sung by Zappa in a humorous manner, talk about a person who decides to go to Montana to grow "a crop of dental floss," mounting a pony named "Mighty Little". He dreams of becoming a dental floss tycoon, by commercializing it. The verses are filled with pseudo-ranch pronunciation and are intended to be very lighthearted.

At 1:55, right after the chorus, Zappa plays a long guitar solo. A middle section with vocals by Tina Turner & The Ikettes follows. Zappa follows singing the last verses and finally there's the coda, where the line from the chorus ("Moving to Montana soon...," sung by Tina Turner and the Ikettes) is repeated constantly and answered by a high-pitched "Yippy-Aye-O-Ty-Ay" (sung by Kin Vassy). This goes on until it fades out towards the six-and-a-half minute mark.

Of the Ikettes' harmonies, Zappa later said:

”It was so difficult, that one part in the middle of the song "Montana", that the three girls rehearsed it for a couple of days. Just that one section. You know the part that goes "I'm pluckin' the ol' dennil floss..."? Right in the middle there. And one of the harmony singers got it first. She came out and sang her part and the other girls had to follow her track. Tina was so pleased that she was able to sing this that she went into the next studio where Ike [Turner] was working and dragged him into the studio to hear the result of her labor. He listened to the tape and he goes, ‘What is this shit?’ and walked out".

== Personnel ==
- Frank Zappa – lead vocals, electric guitar
- Tina Turner & the Ikettes – backing vocals
- Kin Vassy – backing vocals
- Ian Underwood – alto saxophone
- Bruce Fowler – trombone
- Sal Marquez – trumpet
- George Duke – electric piano, clavinet
- Tom Fowler – bass guitar
- Ruth Underwood – marimba
- Ralph Humphrey – drums

== Live ==
"Montana" quickly became a fan favorite and was often performed, especially during the 1973–1975, 1982, 1984 and 1988 tours. On stage, Zappa often altered the lyrics of the song and sometimes even the structure, to great extent. The version featured on You Can't Do That on Stage Anymore, Vol. 2, ("Whipping Floss") is an example of when he did this. Before the song starts, a fan asks them to play The Allman Brothers Band's song "Whipping Post." Frank jokes with the audience that they do not know the tune, Frank (after playing a couple of jokes on the guy and the audience) chooses to play "Montana" instead, yet he alters the lyrics, which later forces George Duke and Napoleon Murphy Brock to pay attention with the vocal backing (and they do fumble at one part). Meanwhile, at the beginning of the song, the band starts playing very fast, which causes Ruth Underwood and Chester Thompson to stumble at the drum fill, leading to more jokes from the rest of the band. The end of the song is a very long guitar solo, that around 9:55 turns into some kind of funk jam, and finally segues into a short version of "Big Swifty."
