= The True Story of Frank Zappa's 200 Motels =

1989 film by Frank Zappa

- Directed by: Frank Zappa
- Written by: Frank Zappa
- Produced by: Jill Silverthorn
- Starring: Frank Zappa
- Music by: Frank Zappa
- Release date: 1987
- Running time: 59 minutes
- Country: United States
- Language: English

The True Story of Frank Zappa's 200 Motels is a documentary film made and released by Frank Zappa in 1987, detailing the making of Zappa's 1971 film 200 Motels. It was released direct-to-video (VHS only, no Betamax was made available).

== Cast ==
Appearing as themselves:

- Theodore Bikel
- Jimmy Carl Black
- George Duke
- Aynsley Dunbar
- Janet Ferguson
- Howard Kaylan
- Martin Lickert
- Lucy Offerall
- Don Preston
- Euclid James 'Motorhead' Sherwood
- Ringo Starr
- Ian Underwood
- Mark Volman
- Sarina-Marie Volman
- Frank Zappa
