= Inca Roads (song) =

Song by Frank Zappa and The Mothers of Invention

from the album One Size Fits All
- Released: 1975
- Recorded: August 27 & September 22 or 23, 1974
- Genre: Progressive rock; jazz fusion; art rock
- Length: 8:45
- Label: DiscReet
- Songwriter: Frank Zappa
- Producer: Frank Zappa

"Inca Roads" is the opening track of the Frank Zappa and the Mothers of Invention 1975 album, One Size Fits All. The song features unusual time signatures, lyrics and vocals. The marimba-playing of Zappa's percussionist Ruth Underwood is featured prominently. The song was played in concert from 1970 to 1976, and in 1979 and 1988.

== Themes ==
Inca Roads is based on Erich von Däniken’s book Chariots of the Gods?, published in 1968 in which he proposes the theory that the Nazca Lines, in Peru, were used as a landing strip for aliens, In the spoken introduction to Inca Roads (separately tracked as “Carved in the Rock”), performed on 9 December 1973 and released on the album Roxy by Proxy in 2014, Zappa states:

“Now, some of you might have read a book called Chariots of the Gods?, by Erich Von Däniken, and there's a little thing in there, it's a picture of this area in the Andes called the plains of Nazca, ladies and gentlemen. And, uh, there's these carvings on the top of the rock that you don't know what they're supposed to be for. It doesn't look like it would have been a road, because it doesn't go anywhere, and there's a bunch of 'em, and some people think, well maybe it was a landing field. But the carvings are very, very old and they're very, very big, you know, indicating that the people who made them were highly, uh, well, they were, heh heh . . . They really had their shit together for the things that carved in the rock. And it's possible that if they were landing fields, that the things that landed on them were NOT OF THIS EARTH. And so we have a song, which features the lovely voice of Mr. George Duke, and the name of this song is "Inca Roads." Take it away, George”

"Inca Roads" for the most part explores the stereotypes of aliens encountering the Incan civilization. These themes, like the album cover of One Size Fits All seem to parody the spirituality of many progressive rock albums around the same era. The lyrics "Did a vehicle come from somewhere out there, just to land in the Andes? Was it round and did it have a motor or was it something different?" imply that a UFO is landing in the Andes Mountains. As the song progresses, the lyrics become sillier and seem to mock the beginning of the song. An example of this is "...or did someone build a place or leave a space for Chester's thing to land (Chester's thing... on Ruth). Did a booger-bear come from somewhere out there..." The non-serious nature of these lyrics and even the music itself seem to be mocking other progressive rock bands and their possibly forced divine depth.

== Song structure ==
"Inca Roads" uses mixed meter. The time signatures include 2/4, 3/4, 4/4, 5/4, 6/4, 3/8, 7/8, 3/16, 5/16, 7/16, 11/16, and possibly others.

The song starts with dominant vocals, drums, and marimba, but soon features a guitar solo performed by Zappa in late September 1974 at a live performance in Helsinki, Finland. An edited version of this solo recording (and part of the bass and drums accompaniment) was "grafted" onto a performance of the song from August 27, 1974 at KCET in Los Angeles. This combination of performances forms the backbone of the album version from One Size Fits All. Later, George Duke plays an equally complex solo in 7/16. In the video of the KCET performance, entitled A Token of His Extreme, Zappa is seen smiling gleefully as Duke plays his solo, as he plays the backup chords. After a short marimba solo, "Inca Roads" reprises its snappy intro. The song ends with the lyrics "On Ruth, on Ruth, that's Ruth!", acknowledging Underwood for her leading on the marimba.

In an interview vocalist and keyboard player George Duke said that Zappa pushed for him to sing on "Inca Roads" and that beforehand Duke had no intentions of singing professionally and was only there to play keyboards. He went on to explain how Zappa had bought him a synthesizer (an instrument which Duke had disliked) and told him he could play around with it if he wanted. This led to Duke playing the synth part on "Inca Roads" as well.

== Legacy ==
In 2018, Prog magazine named "Inca Roads" at hundredth position in their list "The 100 Greatest Prog Songs Of All Time."

== Personnel ==
- Frank Zappa – guitar, backing vocals
- George Duke – lead vocals, keyboards, synthesizer
- Napoleon Murphy Brock – flute, tenor saxophone, backing vocals
- Tom Fowler – bass
- Chester Thompson – drums
- Ruth Underwood – vibes, marimba, percussion
