= Bruce Fowler =

American trombonist and composer

- Born: Bruce Lambourne Fowler; July 10, 1947 (age 78)
- Genres: Rock, jazz, classical, experimental
- Occupations: Musician, composer, conductor
- Instrument: Trombone
- Years active: 1973–present

Bruce Lambourne Fowler (born July 10, 1947) is an American trombonist and composer. He is known for his work on numerous recordings by Frank Zappa, as well as performances with Captain Beefheart and the Fowler Brothers Band. In addition to his performing career, Fowler has composed, arranged, and conducted music for film, contributing to a wide range of popular movies.

Bruce Fowler is the son of jazz educator Dr. William L. Fowler and Beatrice Fowler. He is one of five brothers, all musicians: Walt Fowler, a multi-instrumentalist; Steve Fowler, a flutist, saxophonist and composer (deceased), Tom Fowler, a bassist; and Ed Fowler, a multi-instrumentalist and composer.

Fowler has performed with the Band from Utopia, the Mar Vista Philharmonic, and Strange News from Mars, a project led by Norwegian musician Jon Larsen that features former Zappa collaborators Tommy Mars and Arthur Barrow. He also recorded albums as a member of Air Pocket, a jazz fusion band that included all five Fowler brothers.

Fowler is the recipient of the 2007 Film & TV Music Awards for Best Score Conductor and Best Orchestrator.

== Discography ==
=== With Frank Zappa/The Mothers of Invention ===
- Over-Nite Sensation – 1973
- Apostrophe (') – 1974
- Roxy & Elsewhere – 1974
- Bongo Fury – 1975 (Captain Beefheart appears on this album as well)
- Zoot Allures – 1976
- Studio Tan – 1978
- Sleep Dirt – 1979
- Orchestral Favorites – 1979
- You Can't Do That on Stage Anymore, Vol. 1 – 1988
- Broadway the Hard Way – 1989
- The Best Band You Never Heard in Your Life – 1991
- You Can't Do That on Stage Anymore, Vol. 4 – 1991
- Make a Jazz Noise Here – 1991
- Beat the Boots – 1992
  - Unmitigated Audacity (rec. 1974)
  - Piquantique (rec. 1973)
- You Can't Do That on Stage Anymore, Vol. 6 – 1992
- Strictly Commercial – 1995
- The Lost Episodes – 1996
- Läther – 1996
- Have I Offended Someone? – 1997
- Cheap Thrills – 1998
- Son of Cheap Thrills – 1999
- Imaginary Diseases – 2006
- Trance-Fusion – 2006
- Wazoo – 2007
- One Shot Deal – 2008
- Road Tapes, Venue #2 – 2013
- Roxy By Proxy – 2014
- Roxy the Soundtrack – 2015
- The Crux of the Biscuit – 2016
- The Roxy Performances – 2018
- Halloween 73 – 2019
- Zappa - Original Motion Picture Soundtrack – 2020
- Zappa '88: The Last US Show – 2021

=== With Air Pocket/The Fowler Brothers ===
- 1976: Fly On (East Wind)
- 1985: Hunter
- 1988: Breakfast for Dinosaurs

=== With Captain Beefheart ===
- Shiny Beast (Bat Chain Puller) – 1978
- Doc at the Radar Station – 1980
- I'm Going to Do What I Wanna Do: Live at My Father's Place 1978 – 2000

=== With The Toshiko Akiyoshi - Lew Tabackin Big Band ===
- Farewell – 1980
- From Toshiko With Love also released as Tanuki's Night Out – 1981
- European Memoirs – 1982

=== Solo works ===
- Ants Can Count – 1990
- Entropy – 1993
- Synthetic Division (with Phil Teele) – 1994
- The Good Shepherd Soundtrack (with Marcelo Zarvos – 2006
- Inception – 2010

=== With Oingo Boingo ===
- Boingo Alive – 1988
- Dark at the End of the Tunnel – 1990

=== With Randy Newman ===
- Bad Love – 1999
- Harps & Angels – 2008

=== With other artists ===
- Stan Ridgway, The Big Heat – 1986
- Ed Mann, Perfect World – 1990
- Ray Charles, Genius Loves Company - 2004
- J.J. Cale and Eric Clapton, The Road to Escondido – 2006
- Avenged Sevenfold, Avenged Sevenfold – 2007
- Jon Larsen, Strange News From Mars – 2007
- Stu Nevitt, The Marion Kind – 2007
