= Cheepnis =

Song by Frank Zappa and The Mothers

from the album Roxy & Elsewhere
- Released: 1974
- Genre: Progressive rock, experimental
- Length: 6:33
- Songwriter(s): Frank Zappa

"Cheepnis" is a song by Frank Zappa and The Mothers, which is a tribute to low-budget monster movies. The song first appeared on Zappa's 1974 live album Roxy & Elsewhere.

On the Roxy recording Zappa introduces the song with a spoken monologue about his love of the 1956 film It Conquered The World and horror movies in general. Zappa also says that "cheapness, in the case of a monster movie, has nothing to do with the budget of the film, although it helps".

== Description ==
The lyrics describe a monster, named "Frunobulax", a very large poodle dog. The poodle is a recurring theme in Zappa songs and is an example of "conceptual continuity" in his work. In The Real Frank Zappa Book, Zappa reveals that Frunobulax was inspired by his pet sheepdog Fruney.

Cheepnis was also a part of Zappa's unreleased "Hunchentoot" stage musical written in 1972. This show also included tracks later released on The Grand Wazoo (1972) and Sleep Dirt (1979). Another live version of Cheepnis was released on You Can't Do That On Stage Anymore Vol. 2.

The song is mentioned in the Book of the SubGenius.
