= Tom Fowler (bassist) =

American bassist (1951–2024)

- Born: Thomas William Fowler; June 10, 1951; Salt Lake City, Utah, U.S.
- Died: July 2, 2024 (aged 73)
- Genres: Rock, jazz, R&B, experimental
- Occupations: Musician
- Instruments: Bass
- Years active: 1971–2024
- Formerly of: It's a Beautiful Day, Air Pocket, The Mothers Of Invention, Banned From Utopia

Thomas William Fowler (June 10, 1951 – July 2, 2024) was an American bass guitarist. Born in Salt Lake City, Utah, he started playing the violin at age six, before picking up the upright bass, and finally electric bass at age 16. He played with It's a Beautiful Day, Frank Zappa, The Mothers of Invention, Jean-Luc Ponty, Ray Charles, Steve Hackett, and many others. He had four brothers, including trombonist Bruce and trumpeter Walt Fowler.

Fowler also recorded albums with Air Pocket, a band including his siblings among others. Fowler died following complications from an aneurysm on July 2, 2024, at the age of 73.

== Discography ==
=== With It's A Beautiful Day ===
- Choice Quality Stuff/Anytime – 1971
- At Carnegie Hall – 1972

=== With Frank Zappa/The Mothers Of Invention ===
- Over-Nite Sensation – 1973
- Apostrophe (') – 1974
- Roxy & Elsewhere – 1974
- One Size Fits All – 1975
- Bongo Fury – 1975
- Studio Tan – 1978
- The Old Masters Box III – 1987
- You Can't Do That on Stage Anymore, Vol. 2 – 1988
- The Lost Episodes – 1996
- Läther – 1996
- Frank Zappa Plays The Music Of Frank Zappa: A Memorial Tribute – 1996
- Have I Offended Someone? – 1997
- Quadiophiliac – 2004
- One Shot Deal – 2008
- Understanding America – 2012
- Road Tapes, Venue 2 – 2013
- A Token of His Extreme – 2013
- Roxy by Proxy – 2014
- Roxy the Soundtrack – 2015
- The Crux of the Biscuit – 2016
- The Roxy Performances – 2018
- Zappa / Erie – 2022

=== With Air Pocket/The Fowler Brothers ===
- Fly On – 1975
- Hunter – 1985
- Breakfast For Dinosaurs – 1988

=== With George Duke ===
- I Love the Blues, She Heard My Cry – 1975

=== With Jean-Luc Ponty ===
- Aurora – 1976
- Imaginary Voyage – 1976

=== With Steve Hackett ===
- Please Don't Touch! – 1978

=== With Bruce Fowler ===
- Ants Can Count – 1990
- “Entropy” - 1993

=== With Steve Fowler ===
- Last Blue Sky – 1991

=== With Don Preston ===
- Vial Foamy Ectoplasm – 1993

=== With Ray Charles ===
- Ray Charles At The Olympia – 2004
- Ray – 2004
- Genius Loves Company – 2004

=== With Tom Fowler Interface ===
- Let's Start Over – 2011
