= Napoleon Murphy Brock =

American singer, saxophonist and flautist (born 1943)

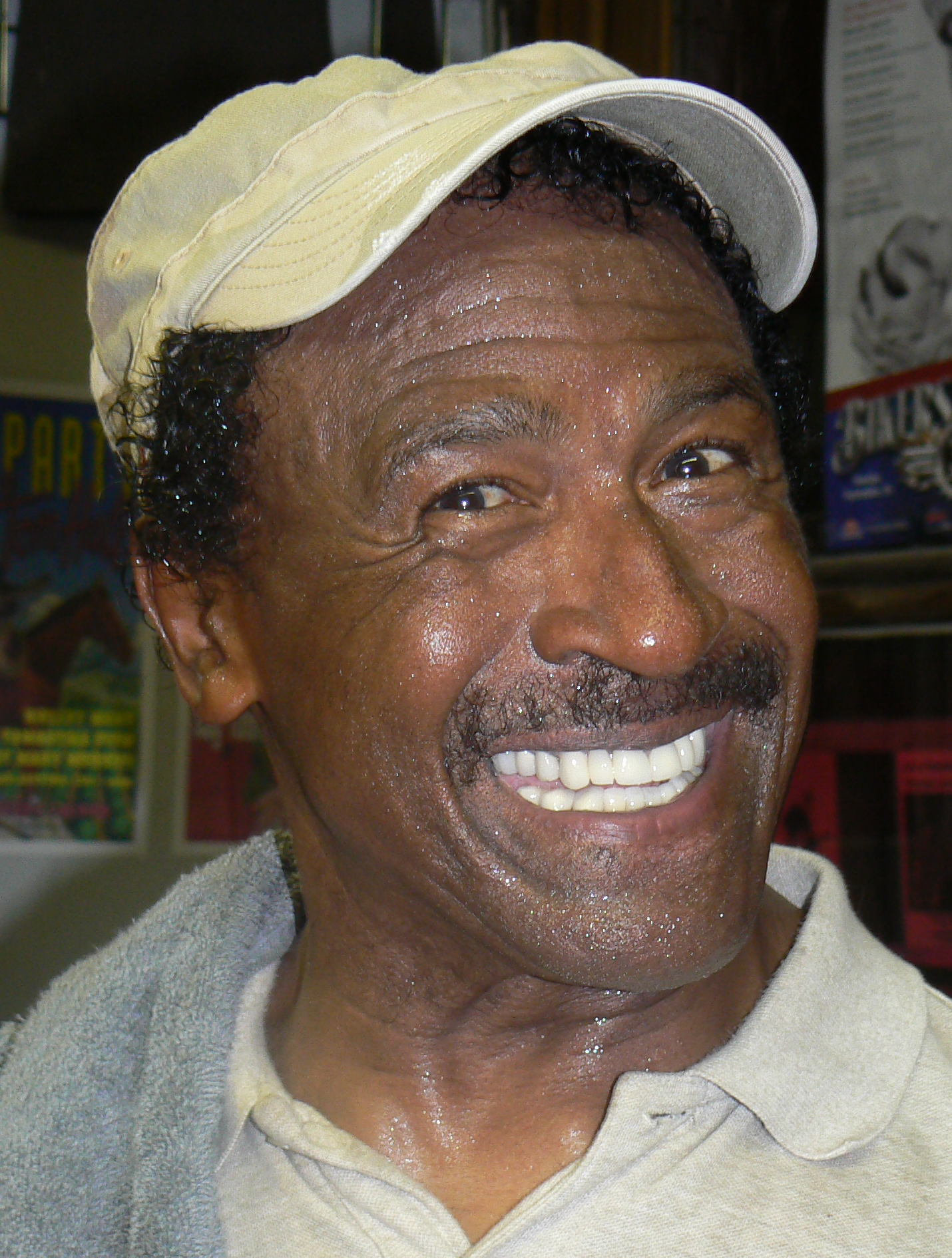
- Brock at Knuckleheads Saloon in Kansas City, Missouri in 2012

Background information
- Born: Napoleon Murphy Brock; April 23, 1943 (age 83); San Jose, California, U.S.
- Genres: Experimental music, rock, R&B, jazz, pop
- Occupations: Musician, songwriter, record producer
- Instruments: Vocals, saxophone, flute, clarinet, guitar, synthesizer bass, Fender Rhodes

Napoleon Murphy Brock (born April 23, 1943) is an American singer, saxophonist and flute player who is best known for his work with Frank Zappa in the 1970s, including the albums Apostrophe ('), Roxy & Elsewhere, One Size Fits All, and Bongo Fury. He contributed notable vocal performances to the Zappa songs "Village of the Sun," "Cheepnis," and "Florentine Pogen."

== Career ==
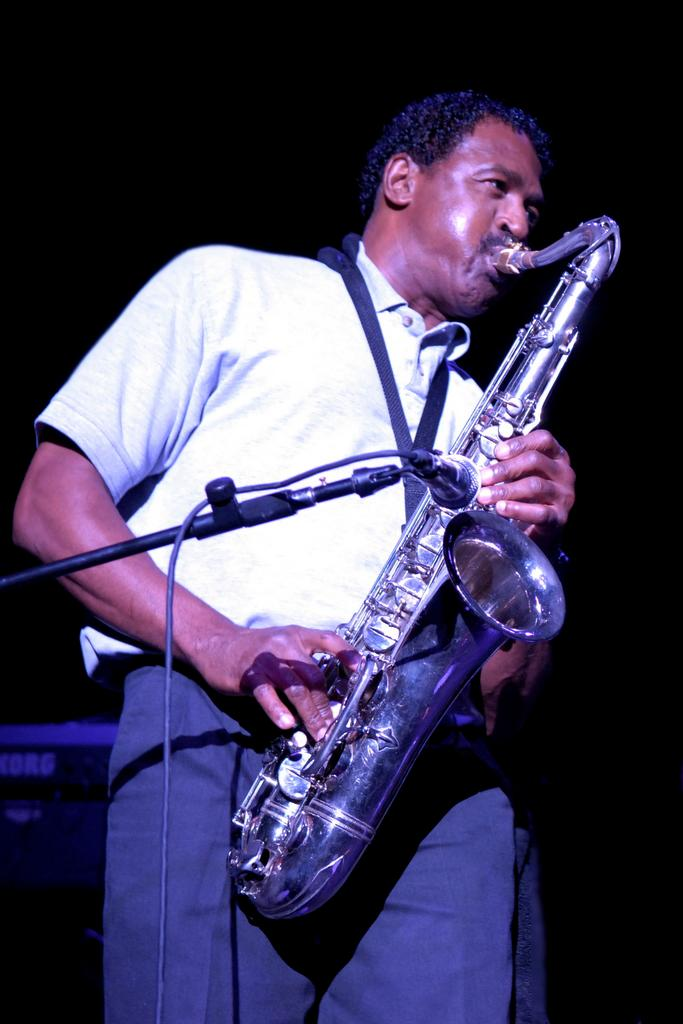
2006 Zappa Plays Zappa concert

Brock's musical career began in the San Francisco South Bay Area in the late 1960s with a seven and eight piece band he had organized named "Communication Plus". He was the lead singer, songwriter, and arranger of the band's strongly R&B-influenced rock performances. He also played the saxophone and flute. He played in a variety of local clubs including The Brass Rail, The Mecca, and Gary R. Schmidt's, The Odyssey Room. He was discovered playing for a dance band in Hawaii in the early 1970s by Zappa's road manager. The participation of George Duke and Jean-Luc Ponty convinced Brock to join the band as lead singer.

Brock's numerous performances with Zappa include the role of the "Evil Prince" on the Thing-Fish album. He has also performed with George Duke, Captain Beefheart and more recently with Neonfire and . He remains a regular performer at Zappanale.

Brock appeared in the 2005 film Rock School, a documentary about The Paul Green School of Rock Music, an extracurricular music program that he and Project/Object have closely supported for several years.

In 2006, he toured with Frank Zappa's son Dweezil on the latter's Zappa Plays Zappa shows. He also regularly tours with fellow Zappa alumnus Ike Willis and others with Andre Cholmondeley's Project/Object. Other Zappa related projects in which he has been involved include the Tampa, Florida based band Bogus Pomp, and the 16 piece Ed Palermo Big Band from New York City.

== Grammy Award ==
At the 51st Grammy Awards on February 8, 2009, Napoleon won a Grammy for his performance of the song "Peaches en Regalia" with the band Zappa Plays Zappa, which also featured Steve Vai and Dweezil Zappa. The song originally appeared on Frank Zappa's 1969 Hot Rats LP.

== Film ==
Brock has appeared in several Zappa documentaries and movies. They include:

- Baby Snakes (background)
- The Dub Room Special
- A Token of His Extreme
- The Amazing Mr. Bickford (on a television screen in the background)
- The True Story of Frank Zappa's 200 Motels (background)
- Roxy the Movie [DVD, 2015]
- Cheaper Than Cheep [2025]

== Discography ==
=== Solo albums ===
Year	Album	Credit
2002	Balls	Flute, piano, keyboards, alto sax, tenor sax, vocals, whistle (human), producer, harmony vocals, Fender Rhodes, synthesizer bass, screams

=== Appearances on Zappa albums ===
Year	Album	Credit
1974	Apostrophe (')	Saxophone, vocals
1974	Roxy & Elsewhere	Tenor sax, flute, lead vocals, co-writer of Dummy Up
1975	One Size Fits All	Flute and tenor sax, lead vocals on Florentine Pogen and Andy, background vocals on other tunes, flute on Inca Roads
1975	Bongo Fury	Saxophone, vocals
1976	Zoot Allures	Saxophone, vocals
1979	Sleep Dirt	Saxophone
1979	Sheik Yerbouti	Saxophone, vocals, background vocals
1984	Them or Us	Guitar, saxophone, vocals, harmony vocals
1984	Thing-Fish	Saxophone, vocals, cast
1988	You Can't Do That on Stage Anymore, Vol. 1	Saxophone, vocals
1988	You Can't Do That on Stage Anymore, Vol. 2	Saxophone, vocals
1989	You Can't Do That on Stage Anymore, Vol. 3	Saxophone, vocals
1991	You Can't Do That on Stage Anymore, Vol. 4	Saxophone, vocals
1991	You Can't Do That on Stage Anymore, Vol. 6	Saxophone, vocals
1996	Frank Zappa Plays the Music of Frank Zappa: A Memorial Tribute	
1997	Have I Offended Someone?	
2002	FZ:OZ	Tenor saxophone, vocals

=== Appearances on George Duke albums ===
Year	Album	Credit
1976	Liberated Fantasies	Vocals
1978	Don't Let Go	Vocals
1979	Follow the Rainbow	Vocals
1979	Master of the Game	Vocals
