= The Frank Zappa AAAFNRAA Birthday Bundle =

Compilation album by Frank Zappa
- Released: December 15, 2006
- Genre: Rock

Frank Zappa chronology
Joe's Xmasage (2006)	The Frank Zappa AAAFNRAA Birthday Bundle (2006)	The Frank Zappa aaafnraaa Birthday Bundle (2008)

The Frank Zappa AAAFNRAA Birthday Bundle was released as a digital download on iTunes on December 15, 2006. It consists of five previously unreleased tracks performed by Frank Zappa, and six new tracks featuring the Zappa family. (AAAFNRAA stands for "Anything Anytime Anywhere for No Reason At All", Zappa's motto of sorts.)

== Track listing ==
1. "Tryin' to Grow a Chin" (Live '76) by Frank Zappa (4:50) - Sydney, Australia 1-20-76
2. "Dead Girls of London" (Live '79) by Frank Zappa (2:22) - Odeon Hammersmith, London 2-79
  - Words by Frank Zappa/Music by L. Shankar.
3. "You Are What You Is" (Live '80) (4:14) by Frank Zappa - 12-11-80, Santa Monica Civic Auditorium
4. "Bamboozled by Love" (Live '88) (5:41) by Frank Zappa - 5-8-88, Wien, Austria
5. "Fine Girl" (Remix) (3:33) by Frank Zappa - 8-20-86 UMRK Remix by FZ with Bob Stone
6. "Girlie Woman" by Diva Zappa (2:31)
  - Lyrics by Diva & Dweezil Zappa/Music by Dweezil Zappa.
7. "When the Ball Drops" by Diva Zappa (3:53)
  - Lyrics by Diva Zappa/Music by Diva & Dweezil Zappa.
8. "Bring It Back" by Ahmet Zappa (5:21)
  - Co-written by Ahmet Zappa & Jason Nesmith.
9. "Feel How I Need You" by Ahmet Zappa (2:54)
  - Co-written by Ahmet Zappa & Jason Nesmith.
10. "Rhythmatist" by Dweezil Zappa (4:13)
11. "Everyone is Going Mad" by Moon Zappa & Jellybird (4:07)
  - Written by Paul Doucette & Moon Zappa.
