= You Are What You Is =

Studio album by Frank Zappa
- Released: September 23, 1981
- Recorded: July 18 – September 11, 1980
- Studio: UMRK (Los Angeles)
- Length: 71:24
- Label: Barking Pumpkin
- Producer: Frank Zappa

Frank Zappa chronology
Shut Up 'n Play Yer Guitar (1981)	You Are What You Is (1981)	Ship Arriving Too Late to Save a Drowning Witch (1982)

Singles from You Are What You Is
- 1. "Harder Than Your Husband" Released: 1981; 2. "You Are What You Is" Released: 1981; 3. "Goblin Girl" Released: 1981

You Are What You Is is a double album by American rock musician Frank Zappa, released on September 23, 1981, by Barking Pumpkin Records. His 34th album, it consists of three musical suites which encompass pop, doo-wop, jazz, hard rock, reggae, soul, blues, new wave and country. The album's lyrics satirize a number of topics, including hippies, socialites, fashion, narcotics use, cultural appropriation, religion, televangelists and the military draft.

== Production ==
After the release of Joe's Garage (1979), Frank Zappa set up his home studio, the Utility Muffin Research Kitchen, and planned to release a triple LP live album called Warts and All. As Warts and All reached completion, Zappa found the project to be "unwieldy" due to its length, and scrapped it, later conceiving Crush All Boxes. Crush All Boxes would have been a single LP containing the studio recordings "Doreen", "Fine Girl", "Easy Meat" (a live recording with studio overdubs) and "Goblin Girl" on the first side, with the second side being occupied by a suite consisting of the songs "Society Pages", "I'm a Beautiful Guy", "Beauty Knows No Pain", "Charlie's Enormous Mouth", "Any Downers?" and "Conehead".

During the production of Crush All Boxes, Zappa decided to scrap the album and conceive a set of releases drawing from both Warts and All and Crush All Boxes, which would emphasize different aspects of his multiple talents, re-formatting the two albums into You Are What You Is (9/1981), Tinsel Town Rebellion (5/1981) and Shut Up 'n Play Yer Guitar (5/1981). All the tracks intended for Crush All Boxes were released across these albums, as were several Warts and All tracks, with others later appearing as parts of You Can't Do That on Stage Anymore.

Zappa had performed most of the material from You Are What You Is on a tour running from March to July 1980 with a band including Ike Willis and Ray White on guitar and vocals, Tommy Mars on keyboards, Arthur Barrow on bass and keyboards and David Logeman on drums. In 2023, Zappa Records/UMe released the live album Zappa '80: Mudd Club/Munich including the band's performance at the Mudd Club on May 8, 1980, as well as the tour's final show in Munich on July 3, 1980.

This band recorded the basic tracks of the album in the summer of 1980 after finishing the tour, with guitarist Steve Vai and vocalist Bob Harris adding overdubs and joining the group for Zappa's fall 1980 tour. However, You Are What You Is was not released until after Tinsel Town Rebellion and Shut Up 'n Play Yer Guitar, although the latter two albums included material from the fall tour.

The album also included guest appearances from former band members Jimmy Carl Black and Motorhead Sherwood, from the original 1960s incarnation of Zappa's former band the Mothers of Invention, as well as the first recorded solo vocals of Zappa's children Moon and Ahmet.

== Music and lyrics ==
You Are What You Is was described by uDiscoverMusic writer Jamie Atkins as "a thrilling ride through 20th-century pop music. Doo-wop, jazz, hard rock, reggae, soul, blues, new wave, and country are all negotiated with aplomb over a series of three sharply edited suites, rammed with witty musical phrases, call-backs, and reference points." The album is made up of three suites. The first two suites are single sides of the vinyl edition's first record, while the third suite is spread across both sides of the second record. "Harder than Your Husband" is a country rock song, while Atkins classifies "Doreen" as "power doo-wop". The reggae song "Goblin Girl" includes musical quotations from "Doreen". "Theme from the 3rd Movement of Sinister Footwear" is a jazz fusion instrumental which took guitarist Steve Vai between one and two weeks to learn, due to its complexity. It closes the album's first suite. "Mudd Club" combines barbershop quartet-style vocals and "malevolent monologues" with a "slow reggae skank".

The album's lyrics satirize a number of topics, including hippies ("Teen-age Wind"), socialites, fashion and narcotics use (the entirety of the suite that takes up side two of the album's vinyl release's first record), cultural appropriation ("You Are What You Is"), religion ("Dumb All Over"), televangelists ("Heavenly Bank Account") and the military draft ("Drafted Again").

== Release and reception ==
Professional ratings
Review scores
Source	Rating
AllMusic	4/5 stars
The Rolling Stone Album Guide	3.5/5 stars

The title song was the only song of Zappa's career to have a music video. The video contained a sequence in which a man resembling President Ronald Reagan was electrocuted in an electric chair. MTV banned the video from airing on its network. In 1981, the album charted at No. 93 on the Billboard 200.

In a retrospective review, AllMusic's Steve Huey wrote that while "'Jumbo Go Away' is perhaps the most offensive song in Zappa's huge canon of potentially offensive songs, [You Are What You Is] is quite ambitious in scope and in general one of Zappa's most accessible later-period efforts; it's a showcase for his songwriting skills and his often acute satirical perspective, with less of the smutty humor that some listeners find off-putting." The Rolling Stone Album Guide noted that the album found Zappa "reclaiming the stand-up stage."

== Track listing ==
All tracks are written by Frank Zappa.

Side one
No.	Title	Length
1.	"Teen-Age Wind"	3:01
2.	"Harder Than Your Husband"	2:29
3.	"Doreen"	4:43
4.	"Goblin Girl"	4:07
5.	"Theme from the 3rd Movement of Sinister Footwear"	3:34
Total length:		18:21

Side two
No.	Title	Length
6.	"Society Pages"	2:27
7.	"I'm a Beautiful Guy"	1:56
8.	"Beauty Knows No Pain"	3:01
9.	"Charlie's Enormous Mouth"	3:36
10.	"Any Downers?"	2:09
11.	"Conehead"	4:20
Total length:		17:58

Side three
No.	Title	Length
12.	"You Are What You Is"	4:22
13.	"Mudd Club"	3:11
14.	"The Meek Shall Inherit Nothing"	3:10
15.	"Dumb All Over"	5:50
Total length:		17:04

Side four
No.	Title	Length
16.	"Heavenly Bank Account"	4:03
17.	"Suicide Chump"	2:50
18.	"Jumbo Go Away"	3:42
19.	"If Only She Woulda"	3:47
20.	"Drafted Again"	3:05
Total length:		18:01

== Personnel ==
=== Musicians ===
- Frank Zappa – lead guitar, vocals
- Ike Willis – rhythm guitar, vocals
- Ray White – rhythm guitar, vocals
- Bob Harris – boy soprano, trumpet
- Steve Vai – Fender Stratocaster
- Tommy Mars – keyboards
- Arthur Barrow – bass guitar
- Ed Mann – percussion
- David Ocker – clarinet, bass clarinet
- Motorhead Sherwood – tenor saxophone, vocals
- Denny Walley – slide guitar, vocals
- David Logeman – drums
- Craig "Twister" Stewart – harmonica
- Jimmy Carl Black – vocals
- Ahmet Zappa – vocals
- Moon Unit Zappa – vocals
- Mark Pinske – vocals

=== Production staff ===
- Frank Zappa – producer
- Mark Pinske – engineer
- Alan Sides – engineer
- Bob Stone – remix engineer
- George Douglas – engineering assistant
- David Gray – engineering assistant
- Amy Bernstein – artwork
- Jo Hansch – mastering
- John Livzey – photography, cover photo
- Thomas Nordegg – Frank's personnel assistant
- Santi Rubio – Studio Secretary
- Dennis Sager – digital engineer
- John Vince – artwork, graphic design

== Charts ==
Album – Billboard (United States)

Year	Chart	Position
1981	Billboard 200	93
