= Ship Arriving Too Late to Save a Drowning Witch =

Studio album / Live album by Frank Zappa
- Released: May 3, 1982
- Recorded: September 1981 – April 1982
- Studio: UMRK (Los Angeles) (studio tracks)
- Genre: Hard rock; comedy rock; progressive rock; art rock
- Length: 35:15
- Label: Barking Pumpkin
- Producer: Frank Zappa

Frank Zappa chronology
You Are What You Is (1981)	Ship Arriving Too Late to Save a Drowning Witch (1982)	The Man from Utopia (1983)

Singles from Ship Arriving Too Late to Save a Drowning Witch
- 1. "Valley Girl" Released: 1982

Professional ratings
Review scores
Source	Rating
AllMusic	3/5 stars
Sounds	2/5 stars

Ship Arriving Too Late to Save a Drowning Witch is the 35th album by American musician Frank Zappa, released on May 3, 1982 and digitally remastered in 1991. It features five tracks composed by Zappa, and one song, "Valley Girl", co-written with his then-14 year old daughter Moon Zappa, who provided the spoken monologue mocking valley girls, including phrases like "Gag me with a spoon!".

The album's first half consists of studio recordings, while the second half consists of live recordings.

== Production ==
Side one was recorded at Zappa's Utility Muffin Research Kitchen studio at his home in Los Angeles; while side two consisted of live performances from Zappa's fall 1981 U.S. tour with studio overdubs. The live material was originally intended for a double album tentatively titled either Chalk Pie or Crush All Boxes II, which was scrapped after Zappa's record distributor requested a single album instead.

The cover art for the album (from which it gets its name) shows the classic Droodle, by Roger Price. The shapes in the cover art also suggest the letters "ZA" (and "P", sideways), as in "Zappa". At the time of the album's production, Price was living nearby to Zappa.

The phrase "Ebzen Sauce" in "No Not Now" is derived from "Epsom Salt", an alternative name for magnesium sulfate. This was apparently one of John Smothers's (Zappa's bodyguard) many malapropisms, which are also referred to in the song "Dong Work for Yuda" from Joe's Garage (1979). In the February 1983 issue of Guitar Player magazine, the song was said to have an "extremely distinctive bass line", which Zappa liked "because for people who don't understand what's going on in the rest of the song, there's always the bass line".

"Valley Girl" – the second song on the album, and the song that would eventually become the album's single – was a combination of a guitar riff that Frank had composed, and a desire from his daughter, Moon, to work with her father. Musically, it is one of the most atypical Zappa tunes because of how relatively "normal" it is compared to other compositions, and is played entirely in 4/4 with the exception of the 7/4 groove at the very end. Tom Mulhern observed in Guitar Player that the "red-hot" guitar riff had actually been mixed "back in the mix", which Zappa explained was "because it conflict[ed] with the vocal part. And that red-hot-sounding guitar was just me and the drummer jamming at three o'clock in the morning. That track was the basis for the song. It was a riff that started off at a soundcheck about a year before, and I had been piddling with it for a long time. One night, we finally did it, saved the tape, and little by little we added all of this other stuff to it, and we got 'Valley Girl'." Scott Thunes's bass line was spontaneous and played through a Vox amp, and was the final addition to the song, which originally "didn't even have a bass part; it was [originally] just guitar and drums".

The pseudo-title track, "Drowning Witch", begins with lyrics based around the theme of the cover art, and segues into an instrumental section of typical (for Zappa) complexity and intricacy, featuring musical quotations from The Rite of Spring by Stravinsky and the Dragnet TV theme composed by Walter Schumann and Miklós Rózsa. In Guitar Player, Zappa commented that the album version included 15 edits between live performances from different cities.

"Envelopes" was originally written in 1968 – with a prototype recording made that Zappa later recalled as being made the same year, but was in fact recorded in 1970 and eventually included in the posthumous CD box set The Mothers 1970 (2020) – and is constructed around a harmony based on seven and eight note chords that "generate their own counterpoint as an automatic result of the voice leading".

Zappa's band for the fall 1981 and summer 1982 tours, which he would continue to feature on the next few albums and the You Can't Do That on Stage Anymore series, included Ray White on rhythm guitar and vocals, Steve Vai on guitar, Tommy Mars on keyboards, Bobby Martin on keyboards, saxophone and vocals, Ed Mann on percussion, Scott Thunes on bass and Chad Wackerman on drums. For studio sessions, he also used past band members including vocalists Ike Willis, Bob Harris and Roy Estrada and bassists Arthur Barrow and Patrick O'Hearn.

The album "was mixed on JBL 4311 speakers" with MicMix Dynaflanger and Aphex compressors, consequently giving a "played up" prominence to its songs' bass lines.

== Release history ==
The original LP release contained a note that reads "This album has been engineered to sound correct on JBL 4311 speakers or an equivalent. Best results will be achieved if you set your pre-amp tone controls to the flat position with the loudness control in the off position. Before adding any treble or bass to the sound of the album, it would be advisable to check it out this way first. F.Z."

The LP also featured a "letter from FZ" advertising the Shut Up 'n Play Yer Guitar box set, which had previously only been made available separately in the United States and, at the time Ship Arriving Too Late to Save a Drowning Witch was released, was being made available for the first time in Europe. To promote the release of the UK box set, the first pressing of the UK edition of this album contained a 4-song 7-inch EP with A: "Shut Up & Play Yer Guitar" B1: "Variations on the Carlos Santana Secret Chord Progression" B2: "Why Johnny Can't Read?".

In some countries outside of the US, Track B1 is entitled on the label as: "Ship Arriving Too Late to Save a Drowning Witch".

It was issued on CD by EMI with The Man from Utopia (1983) on the same disc, and separately by Barking Pumpkin, and later Rykodisc.

It also had a release on 8-track tape.

== Track listing ==
All tracks are written by Frank Zappa.

Side one
No.	Title	Writer(s)	Length
1.	"No Not Now"		5:50
2.	"Valley Girl"	Frank Zappa; Moon Zappa	4:50
3.	"I Come from Nowhere"		6:13
Total length:			17:19

Side two
No.	Title	Length
1.	"Drowning Witch"	12:03
2.	"Envelopes"	2:46
3.	"Teen-Age Prostitute"	2:43
Total length:		17:56

== Personnel ==
Musicians

- Frank Zappa – lead guitar, vocals
- Steve Vai – guitar (credited as "Impossible Guitar Parts")
- Ray White – rhythm guitar, vocals
- Tommy Mars – keyboards
- Bobby Martin – keyboards, saxophone, vocals
- Ed Mann – percussion
- Scott Thunes – bass on "Drowning Witch", "Envelopes", "Teen-Age Prostitute", and "Valley Girl"
- Arthur Barrow – bass on "No Not Now" and the first part of "I Come from Nowhere"
- Patrick O'Hearn – bass on the guitar solo in "I Come from Nowhere"
- Chad Wackerman – drums
- Roy Estrada – falsetto vocals on "No Not Now"; vocals on "I Come from Nowhere"
- Ike Willis – vocals
- Bob Harris – vocals
- Lisa Popeil – vocals on "Teen-Age Prostitute"
- Moon Zappa – vocal on "Valley Girl"

== Charts ==
=== Album ===
Billboard (United States)

Year	Chart	Position
1982	Billboard 200	23

=== Singles ===
Song	Chart	Peak position
"Valley Girl"	Mainstream Rock	12
"Valley Girl"	Pop Singles	32
