= Valley Girl (song) =

Single by Frank and Moon Zappa

from the album Ship Arriving Too Late to Save a Drowning Witch
- B-side: "You Are What You Is"
- Released: June 1982
- Recorded: 1982
- Studio: UMRK (Los Angeles)
- Genre: Comedy rock; new wave; pop rock; art rock; novelty; satire
- Length: 4:59 (album version); 3:47 (single version)
- Label: Barking Pumpkin; CBS
- Songwriters: Frank Zappa; Moon Zappa
- Producer: Frank Zappa

Frank Zappa singles chronology
"Goblin Girl" (1981)	"Valley Girl" (1982)	"The Man from Utopia Meets Mary Lou" (1983)

Official audio
- "Valley Girl" on YouTube

"Valley Girl" is a song by American musician Frank Zappa, released as the sole single from his 35th album Ship Arriving Too Late to Save a Drowning Witch (1982), and featuring his then-14-year-old daughter Moon. Though Zappa intended it to mockingly satirize San Fernando Valley teen culture, the song's success inadvertently popularized the "valley girl" stereotype and its associated mannerisms. It peaked at number 32 on the U.S. Billboard Hot 100. The song was also nominated for the Grammy Award for Best Rock Performance by a Duo or Group with Vocal at the 25th Annual Grammy Awards.

== Background ==
The track resulted from the combination of a guitar riff that Frank had composed and Moon's desire to work with her father. According to Zappa biographer Kelly Fisher Lowe, Frank woke Moon in the middle of the night and took her to a studio to recreate conversations that she had had with friends. The lyrics were a deliberate attack on the slang and behavior of stereotypical valley girls. Zappa stressed that it was not a happy song, and that he hated the San Fernando Valley, calling it "a most depressing place." Moon supplied Frank with much of the content, speaking typical "valley girl" or "valleyspeak" phrases she heard at "parties, bar mitzvahs, and the [Sherman Oaks] Galleria."

Musically, the song is atypical for Zappa because of its conventional structure compared to his other compositions, and is played entirely in 4/4 time signature with the exception of the 7/4 groove at the very end.

== Commercial release ==
"Valley Girl" was picked up by KROQ-FM, who obtained an acetate disc before release. Zappa praised the station's original programming but feared it would lead to others copying it, adding, "I would hate for it to become another service, freeze-dried to other stations." Moon was a regular KROQ listener and persuaded the station to play the track during an interview. There was an immediate response from the public, and the song began receiving regular airplay.

The song was Zappa's only Top 40 single in North America, peaking at #32 on the U.S. Billboard Hot 100 chart and at #18 on the Canadian RPM Top Singles chart in September 1982, although he had charted hits in other parts of the world. The song was also included on the compilation album Strictly Commercial (1995).

In the U.S. the B-side was "You Are What You Is", but in other territories it was "Teen-Age Prostitute." Promotional copies contained the album and single versions of the song.

=== Terry "Motor Mouth" Young's suspension ===
In July 1982, "Valley Girl" was stunted over Philadelphia's "Hot Hits" formatted station WCAU-FM for a short period of time during Terry "Motor Mouth" Young's evening shift on the station (7:00–8:00 PM Eastern). Young was the most popular radio disc jockey (DJ) in all of the Philadelphia radio market at the time. The song was played around ten consecutive times without any commercial interruptions, despite a weather forecast being simulated by Terry himself before sneakily playing the song again. Apparently drowsy after the final play, Terry drunkenly commented on the wrong song ("Abracadabra" by the Steve Miller Band) before the station manager entered the studio and angrily intervened, telling Young to "get out and stay out" before shutting the door on him.

Young received a brief suspension from the station, but returned to the studio soon afterward and stayed for four more years until 1986.

== Cultural response ==
Though intended as a parody, the single popularized the valley girl stereotype nationwide. Following the single's release, there was a significant increase in "valleyspeak" slang usage, whether ironically spoken or not. In particular, the film Valley Girl (1983) capitalized on this cultural curiosity.

Zappa expressed concern that, despite his rich body of music, he was seen as a "novelty" artist because of songs like "Valley Girl" and "Don't Eat the Yellow Snow". At the time of the single's release, Moon said, "I am not a valley girl, but I guess that is my claim to fame."

Mimi Pond created a comic book about the song, The Valley Girl's Guide to Life, which launched her career.

A parody entitled "Valley Dudes" was recorded in 1982 by The Straight A's.

On September 16, 2022 (3 months after the single's 40th anniversary), Universal Music Group (who acquired the Zappa catalogue in June of the same year) released an animated music video for the song.

== Charts ==
Chart (1982)	Peak position
Canada RPM Top Singles	18
US Billboard Hot 100	32
US Billboard Top Rock Tracks	12
