= Sherman Oaks Galleria =

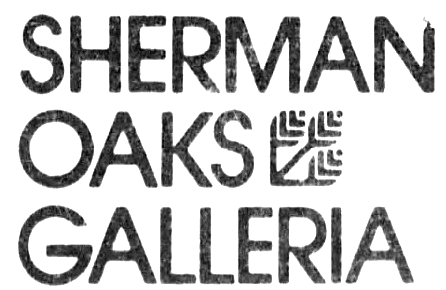

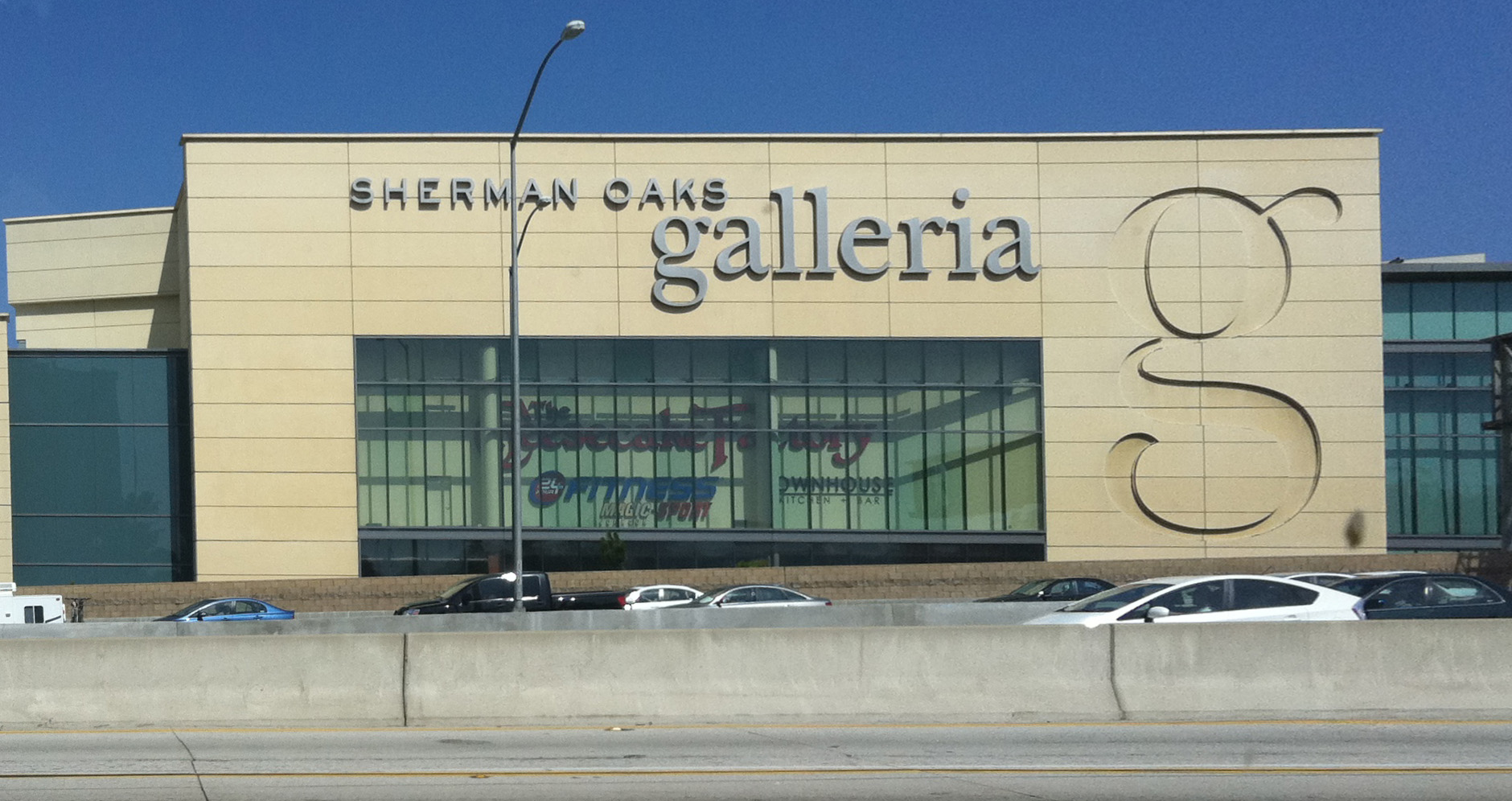
- The Galleria, seen from I-405 in August 2010
- Location: Sherman Oaks, Los Angeles, California, U.S.
- Coordinates: 34°9′15″N 118°28′0″W
- Opened: October 30, 1980; 46 years ago (as former indoor mall); 2002; 24 years ago (as current business, entertainment and lifestyle center)
- Closed: 1999 (original mall)
- Developer: Douglas Emmett, Inc
- Manager: Douglas Emmett Management, LLC
- Owner: Douglas Emmett 2016, LLC
- Num. of stores: 36
- Num. of anchor tenants: 2
- Floor area: 250,000 sq ft retail/entertainment 760,000 sq ft office
- Floors: 3 * With the exception of the Garden Office Building being 5 floors, and the Comerica Bank Building within Galleria complex is 16 floors*
- Parking: 3,500 spaces Valet service
- Website: shermanoaksgalleria.com

Sherman Oaks Galleria is an open-air shopping mall and business center located in the Sherman Oaks neighborhood of Los Angeles, California, United States, at the corner of Ventura and Sepulveda Boulevards in the San Fernando Valley.

The teenage mall culture which formed around it and nearby malls formed the basis of the 1982 satirical song "Valley Girl" by Frank Zappa and daughter Moon Zappa, which mentions the Galleria by name, though it misattributes its location as Encino, which it abuts. The mall has been a shooting location for many films, most notably the 1982 film Fast Times at Ridgemont High as well as the 1983 film Valley Girl, both of which focused on the early 1980s San Fernando Valley youth culture.

== History ==
The three-level mall was built on the site of Moses Sherman's original 1911 thousand-acre investment in the area, at the present-day intersection of Ventura and Sepulveda boulevards. It opened on October 30, 1980 with two department stores. Robinsons anchored the south, May Company anchored the north. Pacific Theatres' Pacific 4 opened in December 1980, and occupied the uppermost level of the mall. The mall became famous in the early 1980s as being the center of the teenage mall culture and a well-known teenage hangout.

The Galleria formed the basis of the Frank Zappa/Moon Unit Zappa 1982 satirical single "Valley Girl" from Zappa's album Ship Arriving Too Late To Save A Drowning Witch. Following on the popularity of the song, the TV show Real People hosted an Ultimate Valley Girl competition (referred to as "a nightmare" by contest judge Moon Zappa), at the Galleria. In 1993, Robinsons and May Company merged, forming Robinsons-May. Both stores in the mall were converted to Robinsons-May, the north store becoming a Men's and Home store, and the south store becoming a Women's and Children's store.

The 1990s saw business at the Galleria decline. In January 1994, the mall closed for 11 days for repairs following the Northridge earthquake. Although the mall reopened quickly, Robinsons-May didn't re-open its south wing store for four years following the earthquake, and many smaller stores on that floor closed. During that closure, the mall suffered due to having only one main anchor store. Mall management sued to evict Robinsons-May in 1998, alleging that the delay was a lease violation and caused the store closures. R-M countersued, claiming that poor mall promotion and management were the cause. Closures continued through the 1990s until a gift and jewelry shop was one of the few remaining stores in 1999.

The mall closed in April 1999 for a major renovation and reopened in 2002 as an open-air center which was quite different from its previous incarnation. The new layout was termed "mixed-use". The only remnant of the original mall is the court where the Pacific 16 Theatres is located, which are on the uppermost of what was previously the southern Robinsons-May store. The majority of the remaining mall was turned into offices.

Warner Bros. set up offices in what was once one of the mall entrances. Several mortgage companies and financial services providers are headquartered within the center. Additional tenants include 24 Hour Fitness, Burke Williams Day Spa, DSW Shoe Warehouse, DeVry University, Paul Mitchell, as well as several major restaurant chains, including Cheesecake Factory, P. F. Chang's China Bistro, Buffalo Wild Wings, Starbucks & Frida Mexican Cuisine. The remodeling and new construction were designed by Gensler and built by Peck/Jones Construction, which in 2005 filed Chapter 7 bankruptcy.

In June 2007, the Pacific Galleria 16 Theaters changed into an ArcLight Cinemas, as Pacific Theaters own the ArcLight brand. The transformation began gradually, with re-branding at the start, and renovation throughout the summer of 2007. The theater was closed for three months to complete the process. In April 2021, Pacific Theatres & ArcLight Cinema declared they would not reopen any of their 18 locations following the COVID-19 pandemic.

On June 18, 2021, the same day Pacific Theatres filed for Chapter 7 Bankruptcy, John Khamneipur, General Manager for owners Douglas Emmett, announced their lease with Regal Cinemas, the first of the former ArcLight/Pacific Theatres to announce such news. The theater reopened in July 2021 as part of the Regal Cinemas chain with a $10M added IMAX, Regal RPX, ScreenX, & 4DX.

In January 2023, Regal Cinemas announced that the theater would close on February 15 of that year unless the lease was renegotiated. In May 2023, Regal reached a new lease agreement with the galleria to continue operating the theater. In May 2025, Regal announced that an IMAX would be added to the theater.

In September 2022, it was announced that Hertz Investment Group would move its headquarters to the Galleria.

== Use in films ==
The Galleria was featured in scenes in several films. Fast Times at Ridgemont High, Valley Girl(aerial, exterior shots), Night of the Comet, Commando, Terminator 2: Judgment Day, Albert Brooks' Mother, Phantom of the Mall: Eric's Revenge, Walk Like a Man (1987), Innerspace and Chopping Mall were filmed at the Galleria, as were scenes for the 2011 release Crazy, Stupid, Love.
