= I Don't Wanna Get Drafted =

Single by Frank Zappa
- B-side: "Ancient Armaments"
- Released: 1980
- Recorded: 1980
- Genre: Rock, comedy rock
- Length: 3:10
- Label: Zappa Records
- Songwriter: Frank Zappa
- Producer: Frank Zappa

Frank Zappa singles chronology
"Stick It Out" (1979)	"I Don't Wanna Get Drafted" (1980)	"Love of My Life" (1981)

"I Don't Wanna Get Drafted" is a 1980 single by American musician Frank Zappa. The song peaked at #103 US Billboard Bubbling Under Hot 100 and #68 on the Cash Box charts, but more successfully reached #3 in Sweden. The original single version has never been reissued on LP or CD.

A slightly different version of the single recording was later included in the 1996 posthumous Zappa album The Lost Episodes.

The song was later completely rerecorded at a faster tempo for the 1981 album You Are What You Is and released under the title "Drafted Again".

The B-side of the single "Ancient Armaments" is an edited live instrumental from the New York City Palladium on October 31, 1978. A more complete recording of this track was included in a different mix on the 2003 album Halloween.

== History ==
Zappa and his label Zappa Records had signed a distribution agreement with Phonogram in 1977 for releases in the United States and Canada.

Though Phonogram did release the single in Canada they declined to do so in the US. According to Zappa, this was because a Phonogram executive who had served in the US military objected to the lyrics. Phonogram president Robert Sherwood disputed Zappa's version of the story, insisting that it was a marketing decision. Sherwood claimed that the distributor did not want to release a single without the support of a full-length album.

Zappa later released the single in the US independently. Outside the US and Canada the single was distributed by CBS. Zappa later created another record company, Barking Pumpkin, distributed by CBS, after ending his agreement with Phonogram.

The song was written in response to the re-introduction of mandatory draft registration during the Carter administration. The issue of including women in the draft is alluded to in the lyrics, and this was also a subject of much popular discussion at the time.

"I Don't Wanna Get Drafted" was recorded in February 1980 at Ocean Way Recording on Sunset Boulevard in Los Angeles. The picture sleeve for the single was one of the first places Zappa was seen publicly with short hair. He had kept his hair long since the mid-1960s, but his wife Gail cut it short around August 1979.

"Drafted Again" was recorded at Zappa's UMRK home studio. It has lines sung by Ahmet Zappa and Moon Zappa which were sung by Frank in the original. This version also has spoken references from the TV game show The Price Is Right: "LaCelia Jackson! Come on down! Nancy Butterworth! Come on down! You're the next contestants on SOOOOO WHAT! And, but, also. A new car! But that's not all..."

== Reception ==
Record World called it "zany, funky, topical, rebellious and pure Zappa" and praised the keyboard playing and vocal performances.

== Track listing ==
A: "I Don't Wanna Get Drafted" – 3:10
B: "Ancient Armaments" – 4:10

== Line up ==
=== Single version ===
Frank Zappa — vocals, guitar
Dale Bozzio — vocals
Terry Bozzio — vocals
Mark Pinske — vocals
Ike Willis — vocals, guitar
Ray White — vocals guitar
Arthur Barrow — bass
Tommy Mars — keyboards, vocals
Vinnie Colaiuta — drums

=== Album version ===
Frank Zappa – vocals, guitar
Ike Willis – rhythm guitar, vocals
Ray White – rhythm guitar, vocals
Steve Vai – guitars
Ahmet Zappa – vocals
Moon Zappa – vocals
Mark Pinske — vocals
Arthur Barrow – bass guitar
Bob Harris – trumpet
Tommy Mars – keyboards
David Logeman – drums

== See also ==
- List of anti-war songs
