= My Guitar Wants to Kill Your Mama (album) =

Studio album by Dweezil Zappa
- Released: 1988
- Recorded: July 21, 1987; September 28, 1987
- Genre: Hard rock
- Length: 41:20
- Label: Chrysalis Records
- Producer: Beau Hill

Dweezil Zappa chronology
Havin' a Bad Day (1986)	My Guitar Wants to Kill Your Mama (1988)	Confessions (1991)

Professional ratings
Review scores
Source	Rating
Allmusic	3.5/5 stars
Metal Hammer	6/7
Ultimate Metal Reviews	4.5/10 stars

My Guitar Wants To Kill Your Mama is an album by Dweezil Zappa. It was released in 1988 by Chrysalis Records.

== Reception ==
Spin wrote, "blustering Ratt-like production [and] stupefying collection of guitar licks nicked from Eddie Van Halen by way of Steve Vai. Unlike Ratt, Dweezil sings not of screwing women but of inane and obvious 'positive force' ideals like 'Stay away from drugs or they'll take you to your grave'."

In the June 1988 issue of Circus magazine, music critic Paul Gallotta noted that the sophomore release represented a significant artistic advancement compared to the prior year's debut effort, Having a Bad Day (1986). The reviewer commended the intricate yet dynamic guitar work, describing it as both subtle and technically impressive without falling into genre clichés. While Gallotta argued that the vocal performance remained only average, the publication ultimately concluded that the musician successfully delivered several strong compositions. Specifically, the review singled out tracks such as "Her Eyes Don't Follow Me," "Before I Get Old," and "Nasty Bizness" as the definitive highlights of the record.

Reviewing the album for the German edition of Metal Hammer, music journalist Oliver Klemm praised the release as "pure groove 'n' roll for connoisseurs." Klemm noted the artistic continuity between Dweezil Zappa and his father, Frank Zappa, observing that the elder Zappa had left his "trademark stamp" on his son's sophomore solo effort. Commenting on the title track—a cover of Frank Zappa's 1969 composition—Klemm remarked that the title itself "could only have originated in the old man's sick brain," a connection further corroborated by the album's inner sleeve credits. While highlighting the album's guest contributions—including production by Beau Hill and performances by Bobby Blotzer (Ratt), Steve Smith (Journey), and Fiona—Klemm credited them with elevating the record into a mature, established hard rock release. Ultimately, he favorably contrasted the album's musical standard with the contemporary work of Ted Nugent, noting that Nugent had been "vainly trying to chase after an album of this caliber for years."

== Track listing ==
All songs written by Dweezil Zappa, except where noted.

1. "Her Eyes Don't Follow Me" - 3:51
2. "The Coolest Guy in the World" - 4:32
3. "My Guitar Wants to Kill Your Mama" (Frank Zappa) - 4:11
4. "Comfort of Strangers" - 4:11
5. "Bang Your Groove Thang" - 3:35
6. "Your Money or Your Life" - 4:14
7. "Shameless" - 3:11
8. "Before I Get Old" - 3:57
9. "When You're Near Me" - 3:10
10. "Nasty Bizness" - 3:04
11. "You Don't Know When to Love Me" - 3:23

== Personnel ==
=== Musicians ===
- Dweezil Zappa – guitar, keyboards, vocals
- Scott Thunes – bass
- Bobby Blotzer – drums (5)
- Terry Bozzio – drums (2, 4, 10)
- Steve Smith – drums (1, 3, 6–8)
- Fiona – vocals (4)
- Ahmet Zappa – vocals (2)
- Nate Winger – background vocals
- Paul Winger – background vocals
- Beau Hill – background vocals

=== Production ===
- Beau Hill – producer, engineer
- Annie Leibovitz – photography
- John Williams – art direction
