= Tinsel Town Rebellion =

Live album with studio elements by Frank Zappa
- Released: May 17, 1981
- Recorded: October 1978 – December 1980
- Venues: Berkeley Community Theatre; in Carbondale, Illinois; at the NYC Palladium; Santa Monica Civic Auditorium and Odeon Hammersmith, London
- Genres: Progressive rock; comedy rock
- Length: 70:52
- Label: Barking Pumpkin
- Producer: Frank Zappa

Frank Zappa chronology
Joe's Garage (1979)	Tinsel Town Rebellion (1981)	Shut Up 'n Play Yer Guitar (1981)

Singles from Tinsel Town Rebellion
- 1. "Love of My Life" Released: 1981

Tinsel Town Rebellion is the thirtieth album by Frank Zappa, a double live album released in May 1981. The album was conceived by Zappa after he scrapped the planned albums Warts and All and Crush All Boxes, and contains tracks that were intended for those albums.

== Overview ==
The lyrical themes varyingly focus on human sexuality, popular culture and other topics. The title track is a satire of the punk rock scene, describing a band that adopts the punk style to get a record deal. The album also contains reworked recordings of older Zappa songs, including "Love of My Life", "I Ain't Got No Heart", "Tell Me You Love Me", "Brown Shoes Don't Make It" and the third release of "Peaches en Regalia" (appropriately titled "Peaches III").

== Production ==
Tinsel Town Rebellion was formed out of two albums - Warts and All and Crush All Boxes - that Zappa originally planned to release following the establishment of his home studio, the Utility Muffin Research Kitchen. Warts and All was intended to be a triple disc live album, while Crush All Boxes would have been a single disc part live/part studio album. As Warts and All reached completion, Zappa found the project to be "unwieldy" due to its length, and scrapped it. He then conceived and began to assemble Crush All Boxes. During the final stages of Crush All Boxes, Zappa decided to abandon that album as well. He then reconfigured the materiel from both scrapped albums into three album projects: Tinsel Town Rebellion (5/1981), Shut Up 'n Play Yer Guitar (5/1981) and You Are What You Is (9/1981). All the tracks intended for Crush All Boxes were released across these albums, as were several of the Warts and All tracks, with others appearing later in the You Can't Do That on Stage Anymore series.

The opening track, "Fine Girl", is a studio recording intended for Crush All Boxes, as was an early mix of the live track "Easy Meat". The Tinsel Town Rebellion version of "Easy Meat" featured much heavier studio overdubs than the version prepared for Crush All Boxes. Zappa wrote "Easy Meat" in 1970 and the song was a concert staple of the early 1970s Mothers of Invention line-up featuring ex-members of The Turtles: Mark Volman and Howard Kaylan on lead vocals.

The front cover art for Tinsel Town Rebellion retains the Crush All Boxes title, with the new album title spray painted over it. The sleeve and interior was designed by Cal Schenkel, and contains a collage of still images from various 1920s, 1930s and 1940s Hollywood films, including Freaks, directed by Tod Browning.

The majority of Tinsel Town Rebellion consists of overdub-free live recordings from the 1979 and late-1980 concert tours. This album marks the first appearance of three new band members from the 1980 tours: drummer David Logeman, who appeared on the spring and summer tours, and guitarist Steve Vai and vocalist/keyboardist/trumpet player Bob Harris (not to be confused with the musician of the same name who appeared on Fillmore East – June 1971), who joined for the fall tour.

== Release history ==
The album was reissued on a single CD by Rykodisc in 1990. (An unauthorized CD had been previously issued by EMI in the UK in 1987). Complaints regarding the significantly inferior sound quality (the album was mastered by Bob Stone) led to a remaster by Spencer Chrislu in 1998. Universal Music Group released a new remaster in 2012.

The 1990 release omitted the applause that Zappa had edited onto the endings of "For the Young Sophisticate" and "Pick Me I'm Clean" to end the album sides. The 1998 release restored the applause and included crossfades from the concluding songs of each side to the songs beginning the following side. The 2012 CD release includes the full applause endings with fadeouts as they had occurred on the original vinyl LP.

== Reception ==
Professional ratings
Review scores
Source	Rating
AllMusic	3/5 stars

AllMusic writer Steve Huey praised the album's instrumental work and the reworked versions of older songs, but described the sexually themed lyrics as "problematic".

== Track listing ==
All tracks are written by Frank Zappa.

Side one
No.	Title	Recording location and date	Length
1.	"Fine Girl"	UMRK, July–September, 1980	3:31
2.	"Easy Meat"	Tower Theater, April 29, 1980 (1st half); Royce Hall, September 18, 1975 (Orchestra); Santa Monica Civic Auditorium, December 11, 1980 (Guitar solo and out-chorus)	9:19
3.	"For the Young Sophisticate"	Hammersmith Odeon, February 18, 1979	2:48
Total length:			16:36

Side two
No.	Title	Recording location and date	Length
4.	"Love of My Life"	Berkeley Community Theater, December 5, 1980	2:15
5.	"I Ain't Got No Heart"	Berkeley Community Theater, December 5, 1980	1:59
6.	"Panty Rap"	Berkeley Community Theater, December 5, 1980	4:35
7.	"Tell Me You Love Me"	Berkeley Community Theater, December 5, 1980	2:07
8.	"Now You See It - Now You Don't"	Southern Illinois University, November 15, 1980	4:54
Total length:			16:33

Side three
No.	Title	Recording location and date	Length
9.	"Dance Contest"	Palladium, October 27, 1978	2:58
10.	"The Blue Light"	Berkeley Community Theater, December 5, 1980; Santa Monica Civic Auditorium, December 11, 1980	5:27
11.	"Tinsel Town Rebellion"	Berkeley Community Theater, December 5, 1980	4:35
12.	"Pick Me, I'm Clean"	Berkeley Community Theater, December 5, 1980; Dallas Convention Center, October 17, 1980	5:07
Total length:			16:33

Side four
No.	Title	Recording location and date	Length
13.	"Bamboozled by Love"	Hammersmith Odeon, February 19, 1979	5:46
14.	"Brown Shoes Don't Make It"	Hammersmith Odeon, February 17–19, 1979	7:14
15.	"Peaches III"	Hammersmith Odeon, February 17–19, 1979	5:01
Total length:			18:28

== Personnel ==
=== Musicians ===
- Frank Zappa – lead guitar, vocals
- Arthur Barrow – bass & vocals
- Vinnie Colaiuta – drums
- Warren Cuccurullo – rhythm guitar & vocals
- Bob Harris – keyboards, trumpet & high vocals
- Roy Poper – trumpet
- David Logeman – drums on "Fine Girl" and first half of "Easy Meat"
- Ed Mann – percussion
- Tommy Mars – keyboards & vocals
- Patrick O'Hearn – bass on "Dance Contest"
- Steve Vai – rhythm guitar & vocals
- Denny Walley – slide guitar & vocals
- Ray White – rhythm guitar & vocals
- Ike Willis – rhythm guitar & vocals
- Peter Wolf – keyboards

=== Production staff ===
- Frank Zappa – arranger, producer
- Joe Chiccarelli – engineer
- George Douglas – engineer
- Tommy Fly – engineer
- Jo Hansch – mastering
- Thomas Nordegg – everything remote
- Mark Pinske – chief engineer
- Cal Schenkel – cover art
- Allen Sides – engineer
- Bob Stone – remixing, remastering, digital remastering (1990 edition)
- Spencer Chrislu – digital remastering (1998 edition)
- John Williams – graphics

== Charts ==
Album - Billboard (United States)

Year	Chart	Position
1981	Billboard 200	66
