= Anarchy TV =

- VHS cover
- Directed by: Jonathan Blank
- Written by: Jonathan Blank; Philip Craft; Jonah Loeb
- Produced by: Jonathan Blank
- Starring: Alan Thicke; Jessica Hecht; Jonathan Penner; Ahmet Zappa; Dweezil Zappa; Moon Unit Zappa; Diva Zappa
- Cinematography: Robert Bennett; Rudy M. Fenenga Jr.
- Edited by: Kevin Borque; Clayton Halsey
- Music by: Philip Foxman; Mark Sterling / Primitive Puppet. Ken Goldfeder & Mark Scaramucci
- Distributed by: The Asylum
- Release date: January 31, 1998
- Running time: 87 min.
- Country: United States
- Language: English

Anarchy TV is a 1998 low budget, independent comedy film directed by Jonathan Blank. It stars Alan Thicke, Jessica Hecht, Jonathan Penner, Tamayo Otsuki, George Wendt, Mink Stole, and Ahmet, Dweezil, Diva and Moon Unit Zappa. Blank was nominated for the Maverick Spirit Award at the Cinequest San Jose Film Festival for Anarchy TV.

The plot involves a group of young people who run an uncensored public-access television cable TV. They are ejected from their show when the station is purchased by a televangelist, who considers their show pornographic. In response, the performers hijack the station and begin broadcasting a 24-hour all nude show in order to gain sympathy for their cause.
