= WebRIOT =

American game show

webRIOT is a game show that debuted on MTV on November 29, 1999. It was hosted by Ahmet Zappa and Masasa served as the announcer. The gameplay consisted of contestants answering multiple-choice music trivia questions while accompanying music videos played. After the question was read, four choices appeared and incorrect choices slowly disappeared as the score clock decreased. Contestants could lock in their choice at any time, though faster choices garnered more points (the score left on their clock would be credited to them). Incorrect choices deducted points from a player's score, at half the value left on their clock. The game started with four contestants and consisted of three rounds. In round 1, the value of the question started at 250 points, and doubled to 500 points in round 2. After each of the first two rounds, one contestant was eliminated. The final round was a two-minute "speed" round between the two remaining contestants with all questions being toss-ups. A right answer was worth 1,000 points, while a wrong answer cost 500 points and gave the opponent a chance to respond, if they had not already. Videos here would be added effects to make them less visible. The winner received a prize such as a trip.

The show was notable for its use of interaction with home viewers via the Internet. By downloading the webRIOT software that was developed by Spiderdance, users could compete with the contestants and chat with other players. The first 25,000 online users to go online before each weekday's 5:00 p.m. EST showing (there was a separate 5:00 p.m. PST showing for the west coast) were allowed to play. Viewers watched the show on television for the question and submitted their answers through their computers. Home viewers were allowed to play along during the first two rounds. The top ten players had their screen names shown on television and were eligible to win prizes or be invited to be a contestant on the show.

The show's set and presentation was made to fit in with its theme of interactivity. The studio contestants were acknowledged only by their screen names while Zappa only appeared to the contestants via a video wall.
