= My Mother Is a Space Cadet =

Single by Dweezil Zappa
- B-side: "Crunchy Water"
- Released: 12/13/1982
- Genre: Rock
- Length: 2:37
- Label: Barking Pumpkin
- Songwriters: Dweezil Zappa, Moon Zappa and Steve Vai
- Producers: The Vards (Edward Van Halen and Donn Landee)

"My Mother Is a Space Cadet" is the first single by Dweezil Zappa, released in 1982. The song was co-written by sister Moon Zappa and Steve Vai. Dweezil was 12 years old at the time of the recording, sister Moon Zappa was 14. The back of the single features a picture of the band, which included Greg Kurstin who would go on to become a successful producer and songwriter. The track was co-produced by Eddie Van Halen and Donn Landee, credited as "The Vards", a pun on Van Halen's mother's pronunciation of his first name Edward). Van Halen also plays the (uncredited) slide guitar that opens the song.

== Track listing ==
1. "My Mother Is a Space Cadet" (D. Zappa, M. Zappa, S. Vai)
2. "Crunchy Water" (D. Zappa, G. Kurstin)
