= Gail Zappa =

Trustee of the Zappa Family Trust (1945–2015)

- Born: Adelaide Gail Sloatman; January 1, 1945; Philadelphia, Pennsylvania, U.S.
- Died: October 7, 2015 (aged 70); Los Angeles, California, U.S.
- Occupation: Trustee of Zappa Family Trust (2002–2015)
- Spouse: Frank Zappa (m. 1967; died 1993)
- Children: Moon; Dweezil; Ahmet; Diva

Adelaide Gail Zappa (née Sloatman; January 1, 1945 – October 7, 2015) was the wife of musician and composer Frank Zappa and the trustee of the Zappa Family Trust. They met in Los Angeles in 1966 and married while she was pregnant with their first child, Moon, followed by Dweezil, Ahmet and Diva.

In 2002, Gail Zappa founded the Zappa Family Trust, a holder of the title and copyright to Frank Zappa's musical and artistic products, as well as his commercial image. In 2015, the Trust was given to her son Ahmet shortly before she died of lung cancer.

== Early life ==
Adelaide Gail Sloatman was born in Philadelphia to John Klein Sloatman Jr. (1915–1967), a second-generation German-American who was a nuclear physicist with the United States Navy, and Laura Freitas (born 1921), who was born in Honolulu of Portuguese ancestry. She had seven siblings, including one half-sibling from her father's previous marriage to Joan Lou Gatt. She was named after her maternal grandmother, Adelaide Silva. She grew up in Hollywood, and lived with her family in London, where her father was posted in 1959, and attended Marymount International School. She also modeled for photographer Terence Donovan.

She worked at the Office of Naval Research and Development, and then moved to New York, where she studied at the Fashion Institute of Technology in the mid-1960s. After returning to Los Angeles, she met producer Kim Fowley, and recorded a spoken word single with him as "Bunny and Bear". The record is a satire of Sonny and Cher.

Gail Zappa made a very brief appearance with her then boyfriend, musician Bobby Jameson, in the documentary film Mondo Hollywood, filmed in 1966. She met Vito Paulekas and Carl Franzoni, the leaders of what became known as the "freak scene" in Los Angeles, and by her own account became something of a groupie.

== Marriage and children ==
Sloatman met her future husband Frank Zappa in 1966 when she was working as a secretary at the Whisky a Go Go nightclub on the Sunset Strip in Los Angeles. They married in a civil ceremony in New York on September 21, 1967, late in her pregnancy with Moon Zappa, born a week later. The marriage also produced children Dweezil, Ahmet and Diva Zappa. Gail had a fraught relationship with her oldest daughter, Moon, which seemed to have been repaired at the end of Gail's life. But, upon her death, it was revealed that the Zappa estate would not be divided equally among the four Zappa children, leaving Moon and Dweezil in a weaker financial position. "It's complicated enough to be grieving the loss of a mean mom", Moon Zappa told the Los Angeles Times in 2016, "and then to find out she was meaner than I could have possibly comprehended ... It's comical, the level of betrayal". Ahmet Zappa insisted his mother was misunderstood. "She demanded respect and got the respect", he said, "and that's really unusual". An interview with Gail was featured in the 1987 book Rock Wives, written by Victoria Balfour.

== In Frank Zappa's work ==
Gail can be seen behind Frank Zappa on the sleeve of his album Absolutely Free (1967) and on the original, parody cover of his We're Only In It For The Money album (1968). Frank Zappa also named Barking Pumpkin Records after his wife's chronic obstructive pulmonary disease, or smoker's cough. After Frank Zappa parted ways with manager Bennett Glotzer in 1984, Gail co-managed with Frank, acted as business secretary, and supervised the record labels and mail order business.

== Zappa Family Trust ==
At the time of his death in 1993, Frank urged Gail to withdraw from the music business, but never clarified what was to be done with his publishing catalog. In 2002, Gail founded the Zappa Family Trust, intended to oversee the release of his recordings, including multiple previously unavailable works. The trust holds title and copyright to Frank Zappa's musical and artistic products, as well as his commercial image.

After Frank's death Gail authorized the release of the album Läther. Frank had intended to release this in October 1977 but due to legal problems he was forced to shelve the album. Upon release in 1996 Gail said "As originally conceived by Frank, Läther was always a four-record box set." Despite this, Frank had already submitted a group of four individual albums (five full-length LPs) to Warner Bros. Records in March 1977. The four individual albums and the Läther package have much of the same music, but each also has unique content. In any case, Warner breached the contract by failing to pay Frank upon delivery of the recordings. Gail also claimed that Warner had broken up the Läther recordings into individual albums. However, this is directly contradicted in multiple interviews. In 1978 Frank said "Läther was made out of four albums. Warners has released two of them already and they have two more that they're probably gonna release."

In July 2015, it was announced that Ahmet Zappa would take over operation of the trust. Ahmet's siblings Dweezil and Moon publicly expressed frustration with his appointment to that role.

Described as "a strong-willed and savvy business woman", Gail Zappa "frequently squared off against the music industry's major players ...". She sent a note ending "Fuck you" to Steve Jobs over the creation of the iTunes Store. She criticized tribute bands playing Zappa's music, saying: "It is absolutely identity theft because from my point of view, Frank Zappa’s audience deserves to hear the music—if it’s for the first time, especially—presented in a way that is in the best possible light of what the composer intended."

=== Lawsuit ===
In 2008, the Zappa Family Trust sued the organizers of the Zappanale Festival, held outside Bad Doberan, Germany, demanding they change the name of the festival, remove their promotional posters (which contained an allegedly trademarked moustache similar to Frank Zappa's) and remove the bust of him that has stood in the city center since 2002. In January 2009, the court found in Zappanale's favor after their defense argued that as the Zappa Family Trust only sells products on the Internet and accepts only U.S. dollars, it had not effectively exercised its trademarks in Germany for more than five years. The court also ruled that the use of the moustache was sufficiently different in Zappanale's merchandise so as not to cause confusion between the two.

== Death ==
Gail Zappa died in Los Angeles on October 7, 2015. Rolling Stone and TMZ reported that she died following "a long battle with lung cancer". She was 70.
