= But Can They Sing? =

- Logo
- Genre: Reality Television
- Directed by: Alan Carter; Steve Paley
- Presented by: James Curreri; Ahmet Zappa
- Country of origin: United States
- Original language: English

Production
- Executive producers: Jay Karas; Andee Kuroda; Paul Jackson; Curt Northrup; Jeff Olde; Lee Rolontz; Claire McCabe
- Running time: 60 minutes
- Production companies: Granada America; VH1

Original release
- Network: VH1
- Release: October 30 – December 4, 2005

But Can They Sing? is an American reality television series that premiered on October 30, 2005 on VH1 as part of its celebreality programming. Hosted by Ahmet Zappa, the series was partially based on NBC's announced but abandoned project I'm a Celebrity but I Wanna Be a Pop Star (originally entitled Celebrity Pop Superstar). Like its network predecessor, it was produced by Granada America. In January 2006 VH1 announced that the show would not return for a second season.

== Premise ==
Nine celebrities set out to prove their singing prowess in an American Idol-style competition, while viewers voted online on their favorite performers. The celebrities were aided in their quest by movement/dance instructor Tony Michaels and vocal coaches Jackie Simley-Stevens and Rachel Riggs. The winner's favorite charity received $50,000.

== Contestants ==
Singing Cast

- Joe Pantoliano
  - I Get a Kick Out of You (Frank Sinatra) (week one)
  - Volare* (week two)
- Michael Copon
  - I Don't Wanna Be (Gavin DeGraw, 2004) (week one)
  - American Woman (The Guess Who) (week two)
  - You Give Love a Bad Name (Bon Jovi, 1986) and Don't Go Breakin' My Heart (Elton John & Kiki Dee) duet w/Larry Holmes (week three)
  - This Is How We Do It (Montell Jordan, 1995) (week four)
  - Hot in Herre (Nelly, 2002) and Walking on Sunshine (Katrina and the Waves, 1985) duet w/Morgan Fairchild (week five)
  - Blowin' Me Up (With Her Love) (JC Chasez, 2002) (week six)
- Larry Holmes
  - I Got You (I Feel Good) (James Brown) (week one)
  - Let's Get it On (Marvin Gaye) (week two)
  - Brick House (The Commodores, 1977)* and Don't Go Breakin' My Heart duet w/Michael Copon (week three)
- Morgan Fairchild
  - These Boots Are Made for Walkin' (Nancy Sinatra) (week one)
  - I Will Survive (Gloria Gaynor, 1979) (week two)
  - You're So Vain (Carly Simon, 1972) and (I've Had) The Time of My Life (Bill Medley & Jennifer Warnes, 1987) duet w/Antonio Sabato, Jr. (week three)
  - Believe (Cher, 1999) (week four)
  - Son of a Preacher Man (Dusty Springfield) and Walking On Sunshine duet w/Michael Copon (week five)
  - Heartbreaker (Pat Benatar, 1979) (week six)
- Bai Ling
  - Like a Virgin (Madonna, 1984) (week one)
  - Call Me (Blondie, 1980) (week two)
  - Girls Just Wanna Have Fun (Cyndi Lauper, 1984) and Summer Nights duet w/Carmine Gotti Agnello (week three)
  - I Wanna Be Sedated (The Ramones) (week four)
  - Volare and Rock and Roll All Nite (KISS) duet/Carmine Gotti Agnello* (week five)
  - Special Performance: I Touch Myself (Divinyls, 1991) (week six)
- Antonio Sabato Jr.
  - Every Breath You Take (The Police, 1983) (week one)
  - I Want You to Want Me (Cheap Trick, 1978) (week two)
  - Addicted to Love (Robert Palmer, 1986) and I Had the Time of My Life duet w/Morgan Fairchild (week three)
  - Nothin' But a Good Time (Poison, 1988)* (week four)
- Myrka Dellanos
  - Don't Know Why (Norah Jones, 2002) (week one)
  - It's My Life (No Doubt, 2003)* (week two)

During Week 6, all nine contestants (except Joe Pantoliano) returned to perform Bohemian Rhapsody (Queen, 1975).

- Not aired (*)

=== Eliminated ===
- Week 2: Myrka Dellanos, Kim Alexis, Joe Pantoliano
- Week 3: Larry Holmes
- Week 4: Antonio Sabato Jr.
- Week 5: Bai Ling
- Week 6: Morgan Fairchild, Carmine Gotti-Agnello

=== Winner ===
- Michael Copon performed This Is How We Do It with the other contestants (except Joe Pantoliano) singing back-up to close out the week 6 show. Copon's charity, Shaken Baby Alliance, received $50,000 from his win.
