= Shut Up 'n Play Yer Guitar =

1981 triple album by Frank Zappa

- Box set cover

Live album by Frank Zappa
- Released: May 11, 1981
- Recorded: July 1972; February 1976; February 1977 – December 11, 1980
- Genres: Hard rock; instrumental rock; jazz fusion; progressive rock; free improvisation
- Length: 106:52
- Label: Barking Pumpkin
- Producer: Frank Zappa

Frank Zappa chronology
Tinsel Town Rebellion (1981)	Shut Up 'n Play Yer Guitar (1981)	You Are What You Is (1981)

Shut Up 'n Play Yer Guitar is a series of three albums – Shut Up 'n Play Yer Guitar, Shut Up 'n Play Yer Guitar Some More, and Return of the Son of Shut Up 'n Play Yer Guitar – released by American musician Frank Zappa in 1981. The albums consist solely of electric guitar instrumentals and improvised solos (mostly) played live by Zappa and featuring a wide variety of backing musicians.

The music was well received by critics, and Zappa subsequently produced additional albums focusing solely on guitar-oriented instrumental music.

The albums were initially released as individual LPs in May 1981 on Barking Pumpkin Records and sold only through mail order in the United States. The recordings were subsequently reissued as a triple album box set in 1982 and distributed by CBS Records in Europe. The complete package later appeared as a two-CD set in 1986 on Rykodisc, then as a three-CD box set in 1995, also on Rykodisc, and again as a two-CD set in 2012 on Zappa Records.

== Background ==
After the release of Joe's Garage, Frank Zappa set up his home studio, the Utility Muffin Research Kitchen, and planned to release a triple LP live album called Warts and All. As this project neared completion, Zappa found it to be "unwieldy" due to its length. Zappa later conceived the Shut Up 'N Play Yer Guitar series, which contained two tracks originally prepared for Warts and All.

== Content ==
The music is entirely instrumental but interspersed with brief bits of comic dialogue from Zappa band members. More of these bits appear on other Zappa albums such as Läther.

Most solos come from live performances. The three title tracks are all derived from the song "Inca Roads"; various other solos were taken from "Conehead", "Easy Meat", "The Illinois Enema Bandit", "City of Tiny Lites", "Black Napkins", "The Torture Never Stops", "Chunga's Revenge", and "A Pound for a Brown on the Bus". "Ship Ahoy" was the coda from a performance of "Zoot Allures" the first part of which appears on You Can't Do That on Stage Anymore, Vol. 3.

The final track, "Canard du Jour", is a duet with Frank Zappa on electric bouzouki and Jean-Luc Ponty on baritone violin dating from a 1972 studio session.

Some of the solos from these albums are featured in written form in The Frank Zappa Guitar Book.

== Reception ==
Professional ratings
Review scores
Source	Rating
AllMusic (2 CD)	4/5 stars
AllMusic (Shut Up 'n Play Yer Guitar Some More)	4/5 stars
AllMusic (Return of the Son of Shut Up 'n Play Yer Guitar)	4/5 stars

Reviewing the album's double CD incarnation in a retrospective assessment for AllMusic, Sean Westergaard wrote, "Frank Zappa [...] was one of the finest and most under appreciated guitarists around. [...] This is an album that should be heard by anyone who's into guitar playing." Another writer for the website, Lindsay Planer, similarly appraised the individual releases Shut Up 'n Play Yer Guitar Some More and Return of the Son of Shut Up 'n Play Yer Guitar, writing of Some More, "it is certainly a wonderful place for interested parties to commence their discovery of the (dare say) many moods Zappa imbued in carefully constructed yet thoroughly improvised compositions such as the seven found here." In regard to Return of the Son, Planer wrote that Zappa "saved some of his best offerings [...] Zappa pours his expansive ideas onto the soundscape with a certainty and purpose that is simply unmatched in terms of passion and inspiration."

== Legacy ==
In 1988 Zappa released Guitar, intended as a successor/companion to Shut Up 'n Play Yer Guitar. He also assembled a further album of live guitar solos, Trance-Fusion, shortly before his death in 1992. This album was released posthumously in 2006. Additionally, Zappa assembled the compilation The Guitar World According to Frank Zappa for Guitar World magazine in 1987. In 1997, Dweezil Zappa assembled another compilation of Zappa's guitar-based songs and solos, Frank Zappa Plays the Music of Frank Zappa: A Memorial Tribute.

== Track listing ==
Sleeve for Shut Up 'n Play Yer Guitar in the 1995 Rykodisc CD box set.

=== Shut Up 'n Play Yer Guitar ===
All music is composed by Frank Zappa.

Side one
No.	Title	Track source	Length
1.	"five-five-FIVE"	"Conehead" – Hammersmith Odeon, February 19, 1979	2:35
2.	"Hog Heaven"	"Easy Meat" – Brady Theater, October 18, 1980	2:46
3.	"Shut Up 'n Play Yer Guitar"	"Inca Roads" – Hammersmith Odeon, February 17, 1979	5:35
4.	"While You Were Out"	UMRK, Autumn 1979	6:09
Total length:			17:19

Side two
No.	Title	Track source	Length
5.	"Treacherous Cretins"	Hammersmith Odeon, February 17, 1979	5:29
6.	"Heavy Duty Judy"	Berkeley Community Theatre, December 5, 1980	4:39
7.	"Soup 'n Old Clothes"	"The Legend of the Illinois Enema Bandit" – Santa Monica Civic Auditorium, December 11, 1980	7:53
Total length:			18:11

Sleeve for Shut Up 'n Play Yer Guitar Some More in the 1995 Rykodisc CD box set.

=== Shut Up 'n Play Yer Guitar Some More ===
All music is composed by Frank Zappa.

Side one
No.	Title	Track source	Length
1.	"Variations on the Carlos Santana Secret Chord Progression"	"City of Tiny Lites" – Santa Monica Civic Auditorium, December 11, 1980	3:56
2.	"Gee, I Like Your Pants"	"Inca Roads" – Hammersmith Odeon, February 18, 1979	2:32
3.	"Canarsie"	Hammersmith Odeon, February 19, 1979	6:06
4.	"Ship Ahoy"	"Zoot Allures" – Kosei Nenkin Kaikan, February 3, 1976	5:26
Total length:			18:02

Side two
No.	Title	Track source	Length
5.	"The Deathless Horsie"	Hammersmith Odeon, February 19, 1979	6:18
6.	"Shut Up 'n Play Yer Guitar Some More"	"Inca Roads" – Hammersmith Odeon, February 18, 1979	6:52
7.	"Pink Napkins"	"Black Napkins" – Hammersmith Odeon, February 17, 1977	4:41
Total length:			17:58

Sleeve for Return of the Son of Shut Up 'n Play Yer Guitar in the 1995 Rykodisc CD box set.

=== Return of the Son of Shut Up 'n Play Yer Guitar ===
All music is composed by Frank Zappa, except for "Canard du Jour" which was a joint improvisation by Zappa and Jean-Luc Ponty.

Side one
No.	Title	Track source	Length
1.	"Beat It with Your Fist"	"The Torture Never Stops" – The Palladium, October 30, 1980	1:59
2.	"Return of the Son of Shut Up 'n Play Yer Guitar"	"Inca Roads" – Hammersmith Odeon, February 19, 1979	8:45
3.	"Pinocchio's Furniture"	"Chunga's Revenge" – Berkeley Community Theatre, December 5, 1980	2:04
4.	"Why Johnny Can't Read"	"Pound for a Brown" – Hammersmith Odeon, February 17, 1979	4:04
Total length:			17:10

Side two
No.	Title	Track source	Length
5.	"Stucco Homes"	UMRK, Autumn 1979	8:56
6.	"Canard du Jour"	Paramount Recording Studios, July 1972	10:12
Total length:			19:38

- Reissues on 2 CDs contain both sides of Shut Up 'n Play Yer Guitar and side one of Shut Up 'n Play Yer Guitar Some More on disc 1, and side two of Shut Up 'n Play Yer Guitar Some More and both sides of Return of the Son of Shut Up 'n Play Yer Guitar on disc 2.
- The 1995 Rykodisc CD reissue is a box set containing separate discs for all 3 albums.

== Personnel ==
- Frank Zappa – lead guitar (all tracks except 20), bouzouki (track 20)
- Denny Walley – rhythm guitar (tracks 1, 3, 5, 9, 12, 13, 16, 18)
- Ray White – rhythm guitar (tracks 2, 6–8, 14, 15, 17)
- Ike Willis – rhythm guitar (tracks 1–3, 5–9, 12, 13, 15–19)
- Steve Vai – rhythm guitar (tracks 2, 6–8, 15, 17)
- Warren Cuccurullo – rhythm guitar (tracks 1, 3, 4, 9, 12, 13, 16, 18, 19), electric sitar (tracks 5, 10)
- Jean-Luc Ponty – baritone violin (track 20)
- Tommy Mars – keyboards (tracks 1–3, 5–9, 12, 13, 15–18)
- Bob Harris – keyboards (tracks 2, 6–8, 15, 16)
- Peter Wolf – keyboards (tracks 1, 3, 5, 9, 12, 13, 16, 18)
- Andre Lewis – keyboards (track 11)
- Eddie Jobson – keyboards (track 14)
- Patrick O'Hearn – bass (tracks 10, 14,), dialogue
- Arthur Barrow – bass (tracks 1–3, 5–9, 12, 13, 15–18)
- Roy Estrada – bass (track 11)
- Vinnie Colaiuta – drums (all tracks except 11, 14, 20)
- Terry Bozzio – drums (tracks 11, 14), dialogue
- Ed Mann – percussion (tracks 1, 3, 5, 9, 12, 13, 16, 18)

=== Production ===
- Frank Zappa – arranger, composer, conductor, producer
- Kerry McNabb – engineer
- Steve Nye – engineer
- Jo Hansch – mastering
- John Swenson – liner notes
- John Livzey – photography
- John Vince – graphic design
- Bob Stone – remixing
- Joe Chiccarelli – engineer, mixing (Berkley Theatre)
- George Douglas – live recording engineer, UMRK Mobile
- Tom Flye – engineer
- Mick Glossop – engineer
