= Jack Frost (1998 film) =

1998 Christmas fantasy drama film by Troy Miller

- Theatrical release poster
- Directed by: Troy Miller
- Screenplay by: Mark Steven Johnson; Steve Bloom; Jonathan Roberts; Jeff Cesario
- Story by: Mark Steven Johnson
- Produced by: Mark Canton; Irving Azoff
- Starring: Michael Keaton; Kelly Preston; Mark Addy; Joseph Cross
- Cinematography: László Kovács
- Edited by: Lawrence Jordan
- Music by: Trevor Rabin
- Production companies: Azoff Entertainment; The Canton Company
- Distributed by: Warner Bros.
- Release dates: December 10, 1998 (Australia); December 11, 1998 (United States)
- Running time: 101 minutes
- Country: United States
- Language: English
- Budget: $40–85 million
- Box office: $34.6 million

Jack Frost is a 1998 American Christmas fantasy comedy drama film directed by Troy Miller (in his directorial debut) and starring Michael Keaton and Kelly Preston. Keaton plays the title character, a father and musician killed in a car accident, only to be brought back to life in the form of a snowman via a magical harmonica. Jack Frost was released by Warner Bros. on December 10, 1998 in Australia and December 11, 1998 in the United States. It received negative critical reviews and became a box-office bomb, grossing just $34.6 million against a budget of $40–85 million.

Three of Frank Zappa's four children, Dweezil Zappa, Ahmet Zappa, and Moon Unit Zappa, appear in the film.

== Plot ==
Jack Frost is the lead singer in a rock band based in the fictional town of Medford, Colorado. He focuses on his music and hopes that the band will sign a record deal leading him to spend less time with his family, including his 11-year-old son Charlie.

Charlie and Jack build a snowman together, and Jack gives Charlie his best harmonica, which he bought the day Charlie was born. He jokingly tells Charlie that it is magical and that Jack will be able to hear it wherever he is. Jack promises his wife Gabby that he will attend Charlie's hockey game, but misses it in favor of recording a new hit song. To make up for it, Jack then promises to take his family on a Christmas trip to the mountains but is then called in on a gig that could make or break his career. While traveling to the gig, Jack realizes his mistake and borrows his best friend and bandmate Mac's car to take the family to the mountains. However, Jack crashes the car in a snowstorm, and is killed.

A year later, Charlie has fallen into depression over his father's death. One night, he makes another snowman that bears as much resemblance to Jack as he can remember and plays Jack's harmonica just before going to sleep. The harmonica turns out to be magical after all, as it revives Jack, transferring his spirit into the snowman. Jack attempts to greet Charlie, but initially terrifies him instead. The next day, Jack finds himself helping Charlie escape a group of bullies chasing after him, and Charlie realizes that the snowman is his father after Jack uses his nickname "Charlie boy". Jack reconnects with Charlie and teaches him the values that he never got when he was alive, eventually convincing Charlie to rejoin his hockey team instead of continuing to grieve over his death. Meanwhile, Mac continues to be a friend of the family, while also becoming a father figure to Charlie.

On a warm Christmas Eve, Jack begins melting and struggles to get to Charlie's hockey game, but ultimately makes it at the same time Charlie wins the game for his team. Afterward, Charlie decides to take Jack to the mountains where it is colder, but has a difficult time convincing Gabby. Charlie then attempts to convince his main bully Rory to help him, and after learning about Jack's identity as a snowman, Rory agrees to help, sympathizing with Charlie over not having a father. With Rory's help, Jack and Charlie arrive at the isolated cabin that the family was going to stay at for Christmas before Jack's death. Jack calls Gabby, nonchalantly asking her to come to the cabin to pick up Charlie; Gabby is shocked, but recognizes his voice and obliges. Jack tells a disheartened Charlie that he must leave. When Gabby arrives, the snowman shell dissipates, revealing a human Jack in an ethereal form. Jack tells Charlie he will always hear him and, after bidding his wife and son farewell, returns to the afterlife.

At the final scene, it's seen that Mac has started to live with Charlie, and the latter playing hockey with his friends.

== Cast ==
- Michael Keaton as Jack Frost, Charlie's father, the vocalist and harmonica player of The Jack Frost Band who ends up dying in a car accident, trying to get home to spend time with his family. He is later resurrected as a snowman in his son's front yard, thanks to his magic harmonica.
  - His snowman form was puppeteered by Denise Cheshire-Pearlman, Bruce Lanoil, Tom Fisher and Allan Trautman
- Kelly Preston as Gabby Frost, Jack's wife and widow; Charlie's mother
- Joseph Cross as Charlie Frost, Gabby and Jack's son
- Mark Addy as Mac MacArthur, Jack's keyboard player and best friend.
- Henry Rollins as Sid Gronic, ice hockey coach
- Mika Boorem as Natalie Goodwin, Charlie's friend
- Andrew Lawrence as Tuck Gronic, Charlie's friend, Sid's son
- Eli Marienthal as Spencer Jordan, Charlie's friend
- Will Rothhaar as Dennis Andreen, Charlie's friend
- Taylor Handley as Rory Buck, a school bully who picks on Charlie, but later befriends and sympathizes with Charlie as they bond over not having their fathers; Rory's father deserted his family, whereas Charlie's father died.
- Ahmet Zappa as Snowplow Driver
- Paul F. Tompkins as Audience Member
- Dweezil Zappa as John Kaplan, music agent
- Jay Johnston as TV Weatherman
- Jeff Cesario as Radio Announcer
- Scott Kraft as Mr. Goodwin, Natalie's Dad
- Benjamin Brock as Alexander, Natalie's younger brother
- Ajai Sanders as TV Interviewer
- John Ennis as Truck Driver
- Wayne Federman as Dave, policeman
- Pat Crawford Brown as Ice Hockey Scorekeeper
- Trevor Rabin as Trevor, The Jack Frost Band Lead Guitarist
- Lili Haydn as Lili, The Jack Frost Band Violinist
- Lou Molino III as Lou, The Jack Frost Band Drummer
- Scott Colomby as Scott, The Jack Frost Band Bass Player
- Moon Unit Zappa as School Teacher (uncredited)
- Mike Butters as Devil's Coach (uncredited)
- Stevie Ray Vaughan as himself

== Production ==
The costume for Jack Frost's snowman form was created by Jim Henson's Creature Shop. George Clooney was originally set to star as Jack Frost and Jim Henson's Creature Shop made the character look like Clooney before Clooney left the project. Sam Raimi was originally attached to direct the film but when Clooney dropped out he dropped out as well. When Raimi was first attached, the film was envisioned as a more direct adaptation of Frosty the Snowman including originally being developed under that title.

John Travolta was also considered for the lead role and Billy Bob Thornton was in talks for the role of Mac MacArthur.

=== Release ===
Jack Frost was released in Australia on December 10, 1998, a day prior to its American release.

== Music ==
Featured on the CD release, released by Mercury Records:

No.	Title	Performers	Length
1.	"Gimme Some Lovin'"	Hanson
2.	"Frosty the Snowman"	The Jack Frost Band
3.	"How"	Lisa Loeb
4.	"Father's Love"	Bob Carlisle
5.	"Hey Now Now"	Swirl 360
6.	"Sleigh Ride"	Spice Girls
7.	"Good Lovin'"	Hanson
8.	"Five Candles"	Jars of Clay
9.	"Can't Let Go"	Lucinda Williams
10.	"Leavin' Again"	Steve Poltz
11.	"Have a Little Faith"	The Jack Frost Band
12.	"Merry Christmas Baby"	Hanson
13.	"Wait for You"	Fighting Gravity
14.	"Frostbite"	Trevor Rabin

The film features additional tracks not featured on the CD:

- "Roll with the Changes" – REO Speedwagon
- "Everytime We Say Goodbye" – Cole Porter
- "Rock and Roll (Part 2)" – Gary Glitter
- "Don't Lose Your Faith" – The Jack Frost Band
- "Couldn't Stand the Weather" – Stevie Ray Vaughan
- "Landslide" – Fleetwood Mac
- "Free Ride" – The Edgar Winter Group
- "Final Fire" – Hans Zimmer
- "Hot in the City" – Billy Idol
- "Slow Ride" – Foghat

== Reception ==
=== Box office ===
Produced on an $85 million budget, Jack Frost took in $7 million on its opening weekend, ranking in third place behind Star Trek: Insurrection and A Bug's Life. It went on to gross less than $34.6 million in North America, becoming a box office flop.

=== Critical response ===
On review aggregator Rotten Tomatoes, Jack Frost holds an approval rating of 19% based on 58 reviews, with an average score of 3.90/10. The website's critical consensus reads, "Sentimental schmaltz and uninspired storytelling sink this film." On Metacritic, the film received a score of 40 based on 25 reviews, indicating "mixed or average" reviews. Audiences surveyed by CinemaScore gave the film a grade B+ on a scale of A to F.

Roger Ebert gave the film one out of four stars, writing, "The snowman gave me the creeps." "Never have I disliked a movie character more." "They say state-of-the-art special effects can create the illusion of anything on the screen, and now we have proof: It's possible for the Jim Henson folks and Industrial Light and Magic to put their heads together and come up with the most repulsive single creature in the history of special effects, and I am not forgetting the Chucky doll or the desert intestine from Star Wars." Ben Falk of Empire gave the film a three out of five stars, saying, "Despite an astoundingly dodgy-looking central character, this is a children's flick that doesn't apologise for being so and in an environment where even cartoons are stuffed full of gags purely for the grown-ups, that's remarkably refreshing." Janet Maslin of The New York Times gave the film a sardonically positive review, saying: "As one more Hollywood effort to look on the sunny side of fatality, Jack Frost is so sugarcoated that it makes other recent efforts in this genre look blisteringly honest. On the other hand, it's just cheerful and bogus enough to keep children reasonably entertained."

== See also ==
- List of Christmas films
