= Normal Life (TV series) =

- Genre: Sitcom
- Created by: Ian Gurvitz
- Starring: Dweezil Zappa; Moon Unit Zappa; Josh Williams; Bess Meyer; Jim Staahl; Max Gail; Cindy Williams
- Country of origin: United States
- Original language: English
- No. of seasons: 1
- No. of episodes: 13

Production
- Camera setup: Multi-camera
- Running time: 30 minutes
- Production company: Brillstein-Grey Entertainment

Original release
- Network: CBS
- Release: March 21 – July 18, 1990

Normal Life is an American sitcom television series that aired from March 21 until July 18, 1990.

== Premise ==
This series was based on the real unconventional home life of the Zappa children and their rocker dad Frank Zappa.

== Cast ==
- Dweezil Zappa as Jake Harlow
- Moon Unit Zappa as Tess Harlow
- Max Gail as Max Harlow
- Cindy Williams as Anne Harlow
- Josh Williams as Simon Harlow
- Bess Meyer as Prima
- Jim Staahl as Dr. Bob

== Episodes ==
No.	Title	Directed by	Written by	Original release date
1	"The Big Game"	Don Mischer	Unknown	March 21, 1990
Simon tries to beat Jake's legendary basketball game. Tess decides to join the neighborhood watch.
2	"Please Releash Me"	Don Mischer	Unknown	March 28, 1990
Max is ticked off when Simon brings home a stray dog.
3	"Two Timin'"	Greg Antonacci	Unknown	April 4, 1990
Tess and Prima suspect that they are dating the same man.
4	"Losing Isn't Everything"	Greg Antonacci	Steve Stoliar	April 11, 1990
Simon goes up against the school bully. Anne and Tess help each other with a diet.
5	"It's Only Rock 'N Roll"	Greg Antonacci	Ian Gurvitz	April 18, 1990
Jake decides to play with his band instead of going to college.
6	"P.O.V."	Greg Antonacci	Unknown	April 25, 1990
Anne's father, a gambler, shows up at their doorstep.
7	"Birth of a Notion"	Gerry Cohen	Phill Lewis	May 30, 1990
Anne decides to run for the school board.
8	"Facial Attraction"	Greg Antonacci	Unknown	June 6, 1990
Simon dates two girls at once.
9	"Prom?"	Greg Antonacci	Unknown	June 20, 1990
Tess considers dating a high school student. Anne wants the police to find the one who bent her fender.
10	"And Baby Makes..."	Gary Shimokawa	Unknown	June 27, 1990
Jake's girlfriend leaves her baby in his care.
11	"Freefall"	Greg Antonacci	Unknown	July 4, 1990
Jake has to give Prima some bad news. Max decides to go sky diving.
12	"Transition"	Don Mischer	Unknown	July 11, 1990
Tess decides to leave the nest. Simon comes up with a moneymaking plot at school.
13	"Critique"	Don Mischer	Unknown	July 18, 1990
Tess wants Max and Anne to review her short story.
