= You Are What You Is (song) =

Single by Frank Zappa

from the album You Are What You Is
- B-side: "Pink Napkins"; "Harder Than Your Husband"; "Soup 'N Old Clothes"
- Released: 1981
- Recorded: c. July 8–10, 1980; August 11 – September 10, 1980 (overdubs)
- Length: 4:23
- Label: Barking Pumpkin
- Songwriter: Frank Zappa
- Producer: Frank Zappa

Frank Zappa singles chronology
"Harder Than Your Husband" (1980)	"You Are What You Is" (1981)	"Goblin Girl" (1981)

"You Are What You Is" is a single which Frank Zappa released from his 1981 album of the same title. The song is known for going out of its way to use improper English, basically mocking the rest of its context. It was the B-side for 1982 single "Valley Girl". This song was also remixed for the 1984 album Thing-Fish.

== Meaning ==
The lyrics, which essentially tell the listener to be themselves and embrace their culture, tell the stories of two young men, both of whom Zappa describes as "foolish". The first is a middle-class Caucasian man who pretends to come from hardship and sings the blues to be manly. He develops a taste for chitlins and begins to talk like the character Kingfish from the radio show Amos 'n' Andy, a heavily stereotypical Black character. The second man, who is African American, devotes his life to becoming culturally white. He changes his lifestyle, such as by quitting eating collard greens and learning to play golf, to fit in with the culture he is looking to join. The first man's story is a commentary on people who appropriate a minority persona to be "cool", while the second man's story comments on African Americans who are not proud of their heritage and feel following White American culture would bring them more acceptance. These themes overall relate to Zappa's dislike of poseurs. Eventually the song goes into a frenzy of racially stereotyped one-liners, including a loose story about working at the post office and referencing lyrics in the next song that serves as a segue until it transitions into the next song, "Mudd Club".

== Music video ==
In 1981, Zappa released a music video. Although the film clip used advanced color graphics on normal dance and singing type footage, its circulation was restricted due to parts of it where an actor, who was made to look like Ronald Reagan, was sitting in what looked like an electric chair whilst applying hair pomade. It is also notable for being the only conventional music video that Zappa ever made. The lyrics also contain the sentence "I ain't no nigger no more", which likely also had an effect on its broadcast. The video was banned from ever being aired on MTV. This didn't prevent it from being featured on "Canoe", a 1993 episode of the American television show Beavis and Butt-Head, also aired on MTV (though the show abruptly switches to "The Animal Song" by The Europeans early on, then returns to Zappa for the tail end of "You Are What You Is", to which Butt-Head replies, "This is still on? That pisses me off!").

== References to other songs ==
"You Are What You Is" contains references to other songs throughout his career and on the album itself, commonly referred as Zappa's "Conceptual Continuity". References include "Gimme a five dollar bill and an overcoat too" from "Wonderful Wino" on Zoot Allures, "Lonesome Cowboy Burt" from "200 Motels"', with the lyric "Where's my waitress?", and the song "Harder Than Your Husband", which is the 2nd song on the album. Another reference is "Robbie, take me to Greek Town", more prominent in "Jumbo Go Away", and "I'm goin' down 'n' work the wall 'n' work the floor" from "Mudd Club".

== Covers ==
The a cappella group The Persuasions covered "You Are What You Is" on their album Frankly a Cappella.

== Track listing ==
7"

A. "You Are What You Is" – 4:22
B. "Pink Napkins" – 4:32

12"

A1. "You Are What You Is" – 4:22
A2. "Pink Napkins" – 4:32
B1. "Harder Than Your Husband" – 2:29
B2. "Soup 'N Old Clothes" – 7:50
