= Havin' a Bad Day =

Studio album by Dweezil Zappa
- Released: August 22, 1986 (LP); August 10, 1987 (CD)
- Genres: Glam metal, hard rock
- Length: 36:07
- Label: Barking Pumpkin Records
- Producers: Frank Zappa & Bob Stone

Dweezil Zappa chronology
Havin' a Bad Day (1986)	My Guitar Wants to Kill Your Mama (1988)

Professional ratings
Review scores
Source	Rating
AllMusic	3/5 stars
Kerrang!	3/5 stars

Havin' a Bad Day is the first album by Dweezil Zappa, released in 1986.

== Track listing ==
- All songs written by Dweezil Zappa, except where noted.
1. "Havin' a Bad Day" (Zappa, Scott Thunes) 4:09
2. "Blonde Hair, Brown Nose" (Zappa, Thunes) 3:45
3. "You Can't Ruin Me" 5:25
4. "The Pirate Song" 3:51
5. "You Can't Imagine" 3:14
6. "Let's Talk About It" 4:05
7. "Electric Hoedown" 3:24
8. "I Want a Yacht" (Zappa, Thunes, Gail Zappa) 3:40
9. "I Feel Like I Wanna Cry" 4:28
