= Diva Zappa =

American artist and actress (born 1979)

- Born: July 30, 1979 (age 47)
- Occupations: Artist; businessperson; actress; musician
- Parent(s): Frank Zappa; Gail Zappa
- Relatives: Moon Unit Zappa (sister); Dweezil Zappa (brother); Ahmet Zappa (brother)

Diva Zappa (born July 30, 1979) is an American artist and actress who has also recorded a one-off comedy single. She is the youngest child of musician Frank Zappa and wife Gail Zappa.

== Personal life ==
Born July 30, 1979, Diva Zappa has three older siblings: sister Moon and brothers Dweezil and Ahmet.

According to Frank, she was given the name Diva "because of the loud quality of her voice. She's audible at 300 yards." Zappa won an award at age 12 in a poster contest to raise awareness about child abuse and neglect.

Zappa's father, Frank, died in 1993. Following the death of her mother, Gail, in October 2015, Zappa and her brother Ahmet were awarded control of the Zappa Family Trust with shares of 30% each, while Moon and Dweezil were given smaller shares of 20% each. As beneficiaries only, Moon and Dweezil will not receive distributions from the trust until it is profitable per the trust agreement; in 2016, it was still in debt and they must seek permission from Ahmet, the trustee, to earn money with their father's music or from merchandise bearing his name. The uneven divide of the trust has resulted in several conflicts between Frank Zappa's children, including a feud between Dweezil and Ahmet over Dweezil's use of his father's music in live performances. In a 2016 interview with the Los Angeles Times, Zappa said her primary role in the trust is to be present when her father's work is highlighted.

== Career ==
In 1999, Zappa released a comedy single called "When the Ball Drops" about her "hunt for someone to make out with on the Millennium". Tipper Gore played drums on the recording and Kristin Gore sang backup vocals.

Since 2002, Zappa has run her own website/business called "Hand Made Beauty" where she sells her own self-designed and made clothing. The clothing is primarily knitted or crocheted, and consists of hats, ponchos and skirts. A percentage of all sales are donated to the Creative Visions Foundation. She was initially taught how to knit by actress Laurie Metcalf. She does not plan her work, preferring instead to work in a spontaneous manner. In 2011, Zappa had her first UK show of "contemporary knitwear art and couture canvases" with an exhibition titled "Bruce" at the Maison Bertaux Gallery in Soho. The exhibition featured an embroidered photograph of her brother Dweezil playing guitar.

A full-length dress Zappa knitted was worn to the 2009 Grammy Awards by Chloé Trujillo, the wife of Metallica bassist Robert Trujillo. She also made a cape for Diablo Cody.

On October 29, 2013, Diva appeared in the UK premiere of her late father's orchestral work 200 Motels at the Royal Festival Hall, London; she played the role of Groupie 2 (Lucy).

== Filmography ==
=== Film ===
Year	Title	Role	Notes
2015	Fun Size Horror: Volume One	Christie	Segment: "Voice"
2022	Next Exit	Karma	

=== Television ===
Year	Title	Role	Notes
1998	Anarchy TV	Courtney	
1999	Felicity	Student #2	
2007	Brothers & Sisters	Classmate #2	
2007	The Mighty Boosh	Astrid	
2009	Make It or Break It	Girl #2	
2016	Roadies	Harvest	
2017	Better Things	TBA	
2019	Good Girls	Harvest	
