= Dweezil Zappa =

American rock guitarist and actor (born 1969)

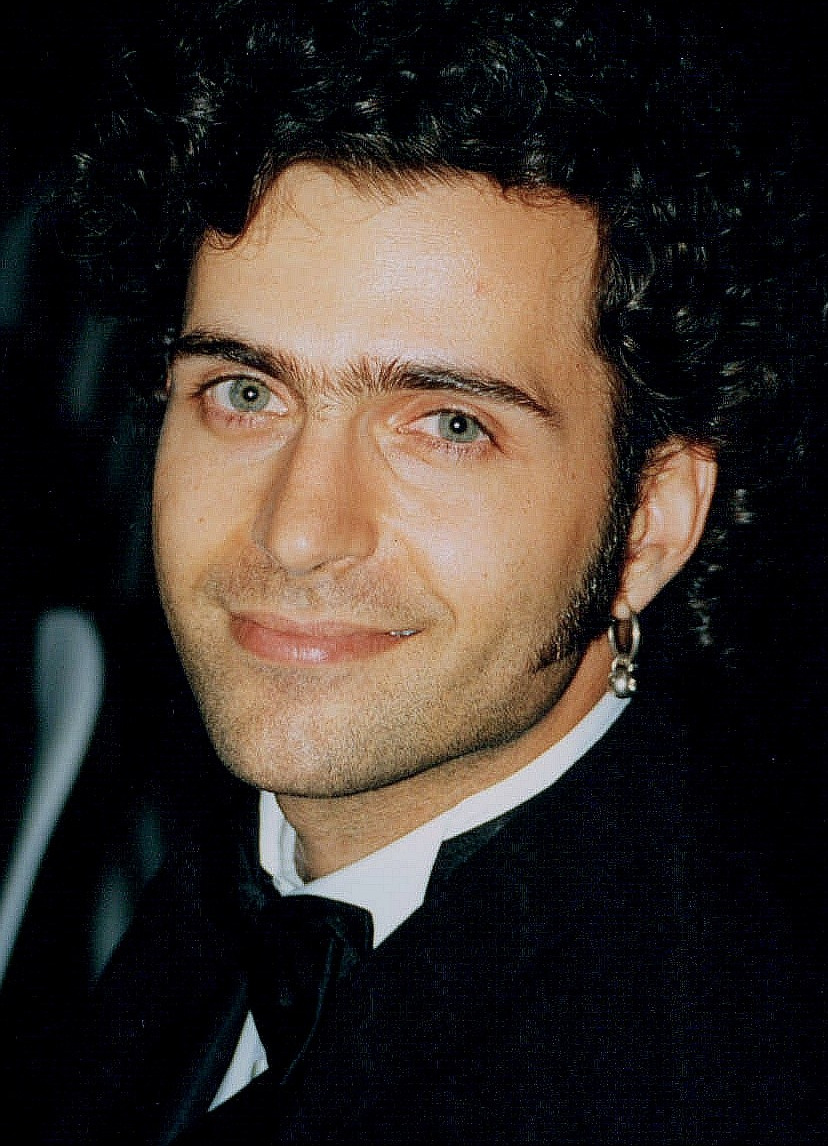
- Zappa in 1996

Background information
- Born: Ian Donald Calvin Euclid Zappa; September 5, 1969 (age 57); Los Angeles, California, U.S.
- Genres: Rock; hard rock; heavy metal; instrumental rock
- Instruments: Guitar; vocals
- Years active: 1986–present
- Labels: Zappa; Favored Nations; Barking Pumpkin; Chrysalis
- Member of: Zappa Plays Zappa
- Spouse: Lauren Knudsen (m. 2005; div. 2010)
- Partner: Lisa Loeb (1998–2004)
- Website: dweezilzappa.com

Dweezil Zappa (born Ian Donald Calvin Euclid Zappa, September 5, 1969) is an American rock guitarist and occasional actor. He is the son of musical composer and performer Frank Zappa. Exposed to the music industry from an early age, Zappa developed a strong affinity for playing the guitar and producing music. Able to learn directly from guitarists such as Steve Vai and Eddie Van Halen, Zappa released his first single (produced by Eddie Van Halen) at the age of 12.

In addition to writing and recording his own music, Zappa has carried on the legacy of his father's music by touring with the group Zappa Plays Zappa. The band features renditions of Zappa's original material and the lineup has often included Zappa alumni such as Napoleon Murphy Brock, Steve Vai, Terry Bozzio and others.

== Early life ==
Dweezil Zappa was born on September 5, 1969, in Los Angeles, California, to Frank Zappa and Gail Zappa. He is the second of four siblings: his older sister, Moon, younger sister Diva and younger brother Ahmet, and is the cousin of actress Lala Sloatman. Zappa's father was of Sicilian, Greek, Arab, and French descent, and his mother was of German and Portuguese ancestry.

Dweezil's registered birth name was Ian Donald Calvin Euclid Zappa. The nurse at the hospital at which he was born refused to register him under the name Dweezil, to the point of arguing with Gail in the delivery room about it. Rattled at this turn of events, Frank rapidly listed the names of several musician friends, and the nurse added all of them to the birth certificate. "Dweezil" was a nickname coined by Frank for a funny-looking pinky toe of Gail's. At the age of five years, Dweezil learned that his legal name was different, and he insisted on having his nickname become his legal name. Gail and Frank hired an attorney and soon the name Dweezil was official.

== Career ==
In the 1980s, Zappa worked as an MTV VJ and was promptly fired after making derogatory remarks about MTV on The Howard Stern Show. He also recorded some solo albums, as well as playing for other artists. Zappa can be heard playing lead guitar on the Fat Boys' "Wipe Out" (1987) and can be seen in the music video for Don Johnson's top 40 song, "Heartbeat". He also played co-lead guitar (along with Reb Beach) on Winger's cover of Jimi Hendrix's "Purple Haze". He also had a minor part in the futuristic Arnold Schwarzenegger film The Running Man as Stevie ("Don't touch that dial!"), and gave his most famous cameo role in John Hughes's Brat Pack film, Pretty in Pink, as Andie's friend, Simon.

Since the 1990s, Zappa has been working on a piece of music named "What the Hell Was I Thinking?", a 75-minute piece featuring guitar solos by dozens of famous guitar players. The project has suffered from numerous difficulties and has been reworked several times since the '90s. Zappa said in September 2004: "I started recording it on analog tape almost 13 years ago... There are probably about 35 guest guitar players on it, everybody from Brian May to Eddie Van Halen, Eric Johnson, Angus and Malcolm Young—it's quite a crazy project. I'm still waiting and hoping to record Jeff Beck and Jimmy Page as some of my final guests on there."

For his 1991 album Confessions, Zappa recorded a cover of the Bee Gees' "Stayin' Alive" which featured vocals by Ozzy Osbourne. However, due to Osbourne's label refusing to allow the feature, the vocals were re-recorded by Donny Osmond, who was signed to the same label as Zappa. The version with Osbourne's vocals later appeared on Osbourne's box set Prince of Darkness.

In the mid-1990s, Zappa voiced the character Ajax Duckman on the animated series Duckman. He also briefly appeared in the television sitcom Normal Life with sister Moon Unit Zappa and former Laverne & Shirley star Cindy Williams. He composed and performed the theme music for The Ben Stiller Show (the solo from Spinal Tap's "Break Like the Wind"). In 1998, Zappa played music agent John Kaplan in the Warner Bros. family comedy Jack Frost. In 1999, Dweezil, alongside his brother, Ahmet Zappa, starred in a show featuring celebrities, bands and dance troupe called Happy Hour which debuted April 3, 1999, on the USA Network. The show lasted for one season despite its success due to a copyright dispute over the title of the show. To promote the show, he and Ahmet appeared briefly on the World Wrestling Federation's Rage Party, held the night prior to WrestleMania XV.

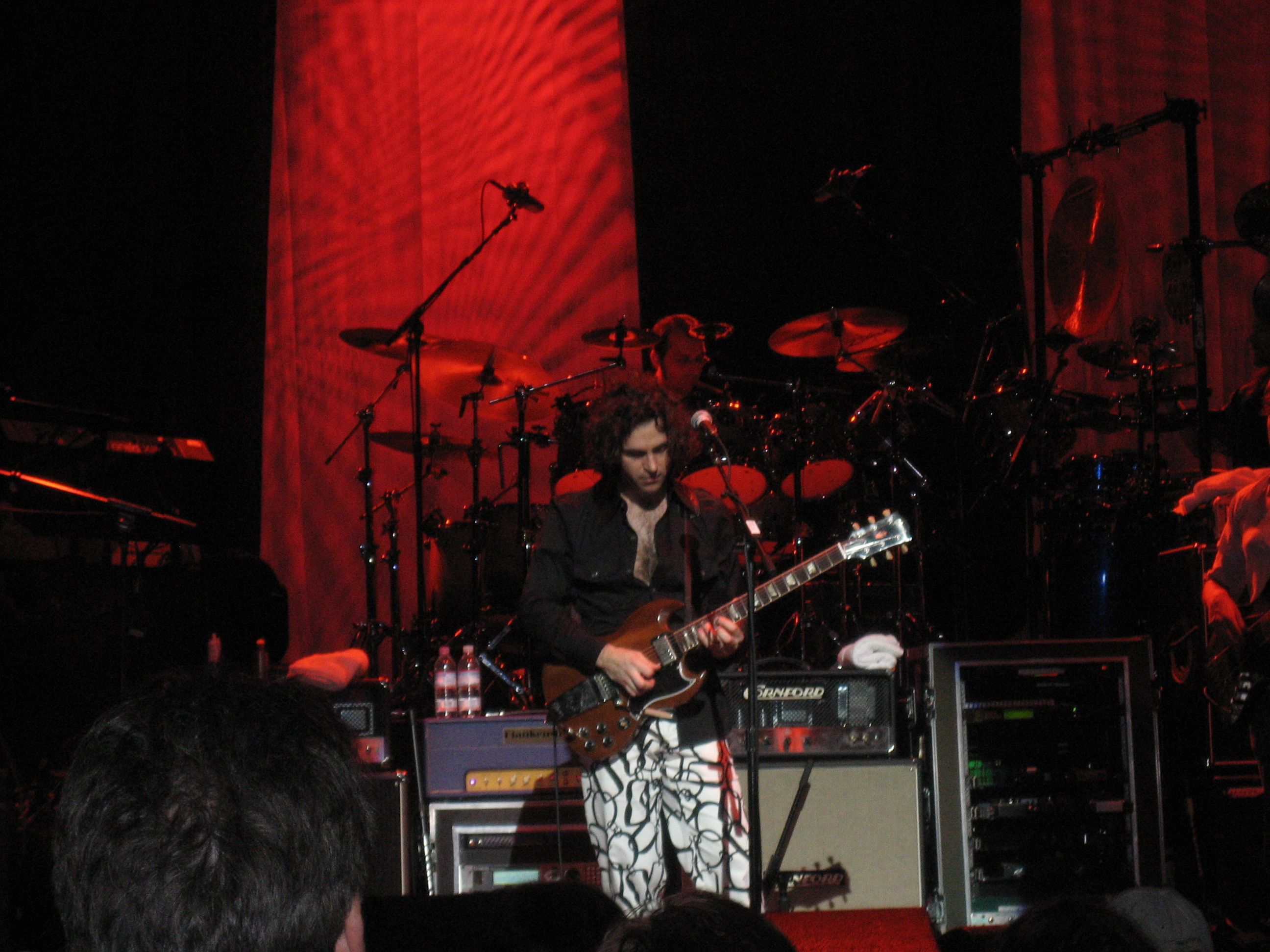
Dweezil Zappa performing on the "Zappa Plays Zappa" tour in 2006

In "Weird Al" Yankovic's 2003 eleventh studio album Poodle Hat, Zappa performs the opening guitar solo and sings on the track, "Genius in France". In 2006, Zappa organized the "Zappa Plays Zappa" tour. He assembled a band of young musicians with a view to bringing the music of Frank Zappa to a younger audience. The tour also featured guest appearances by Steve Vai, Napoleon Murphy Brock and Terry Bozzio. The tour began in Europe in May with dates in the U.S. from June. After a break it continued in the U.S. on October 18, 2006. The 2007 version of the tour ran from July, finishing in Australia in early December, and featured Ray White as special guest. The shows ended with the promise: "There are so many songs we want to learn to play ... see y'all next year ...", and further tours have followed each year since 2007. In 2009, Ray White left Zappa Plays Zappa for an undisclosed reason.

Zappa lent his voice to one of the characters in one episode of Metalocalypse on Adult Swim.

In 2016, Zappa went on tour to celebrate the 50th anniversary of the release of Frank Zappa's album Freak Out! The tour was titled "50 Years of Frank: Dweezil Zappa Plays Whatever the F@%k He Wants – The Cease and Desist Tour". The tour title was inspired by Zappa's feud with his brother Ahmet over the use of the "Zappa Plays Zappa" moniker, which resulted in Ahmet sending Zappa a cease-and-desist letter through the family trust.

== Personal life ==
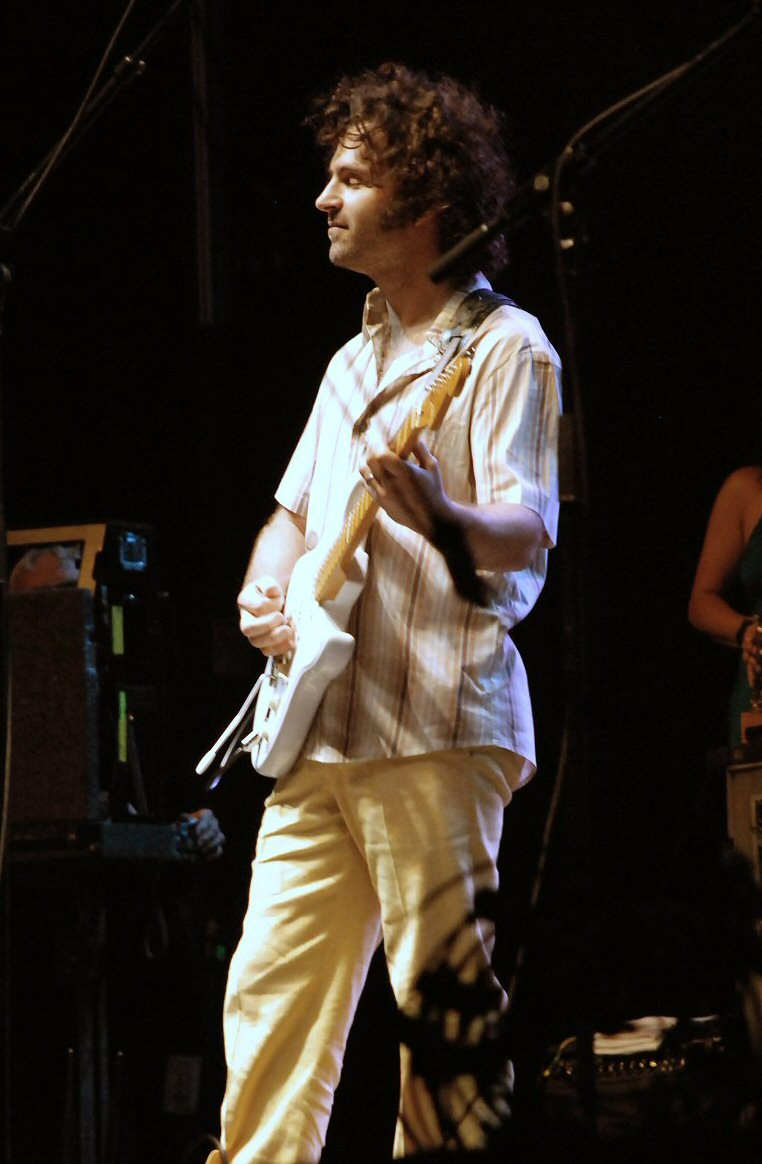
Dweezil Zappa at Bluesfest 2008 in Ottawa, Ontario

In the 1980s, Zappa dated actresses Molly Ringwald and Demi Moore, and journalist Katie Wagner.

From 1998 to 2004, Zappa dated musician Lisa Loeb. Zappa and Loeb wrote and performed music together, and Zappa toured with Loeb's band. The couple co-hosted the cooking show Dweezil & Lisa on Food Network in 2004.

Zappa married fashion stylist Lauren Knudsen on September 3, 2005, in Los Angeles. They have two daughters: Zola Frank Zappa (b. 2006) and Ceylon Indira Zappa (b. 2008). In March 2010 Knudsen filed for divorce in L.A. County Superior Court. According to the documents, she applied to share legal custody of their two daughters. In March 2012, with the divorce case still unresolved, Zappa's former lawyer made a public issue of his unpaid legal bills.

Following the death of Zappa's mother, Gail, in October 2015, it was revealed that his siblings Ahmet and Diva were given control of the Zappa Family Trust with shares of 30% each, while Dweezil and his sister Moon were given smaller shares of 20% each. As beneficiaries only, Moon and Dweezil will not receive any distributions from the trust until it is profitable—in 2016 it was "millions of dollars in debt"—and must seek permission from Ahmet, the trustee, to make money off of their father's music or merchandise bearing his name. Dweezil received a cease and desist letter from the trust after he announced that he was being forced to perform his upcoming tour as "Dweezil Zappa Plays Frank Zappa" instead of using "Zappa Plays Zappa". In response to the trust's action, he renamed his performance series "50 Years of Frank: Dweezil Zappa Plays Whatever the F@%k He Wants—the Cease and Desist Tour".

In May 2018, the four siblings announced that they had reconciled. But as of August 2024, Dweezil was no longer speaking with his siblings.

== Musical equipment ==
=== Guitars ===
- Gibson SG – made of walnut, the main guitar on the F. O. H. album of Zappa Plays Zappa
- Gibson Les Paul – 1958 reissue, wired like Jimmy Page's. Dweezil currently owns & plays the Les Paul Custom his father played between 1980-1982 and was featured on the cover of Shut Up n' Play Yer Guitar.
- Gibson Roxy SG – a replica of a guitar played by Frank Zappa on tour and in the studio during the '60s and '70s, the original Roxy SG can be seen depicted on the Roxy and Elsewhere album cover. Gibson produced a limited run of 400 Roxy SGs, featuring custom electronics and Maestro vibrola tail piece. Zappa has used his own Roxy during Zappa Plays Zappa tours. Dweezil also owns & uses the original Roxy SG.
- Fender Stratocaster - On previous Zappa Plays Zappa tours, Dweezil used stock Fender Eric Johnson Signature Stratocasters. At one point, Dweezil owned a Strat previously used by Jimi Hendrix and given to Frank
- Shabat Lynx DZ - Th Lynx DZ is Dweezil’s heavily modded Shabat Lynx model, including his body-mounted HSS configuration with a push/pull phase shift on the middle pickup, simplified single-knob layout, custom-cut 3-ply parchment/gold pickguard, and fitted with a Vega-Trem VT1 tremolo. The Shabat Lynx DZ was regularly used on his 2024 "Rox(Postroph)Y Return of the Son of..." tour.

=== Amplifiers ===
- Fractal Audio Axe-FX 2
- Fractal Audio Axe-FX III

== Discography ==
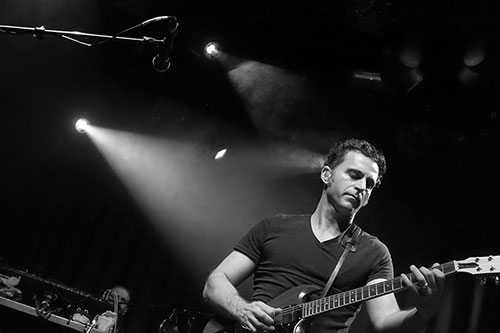
Dweezil Zappa (2015) in Aarhus, Denmark

=== Solo ===
- 1982 – "My Mother Is a Space Cadet"/"Crunchy Water", 12" single
- 1986 – Havin' a Bad Day
- 1988 – My Guitar Wants to Kill Your Mama
- 1991 – Confessions
- 2000 – Automatic
- 2006 – Go with What You Know
- 2015 – Via Zammata'
- 2024 - Double Nickels

=== With Ahmet Zappa ===
- 1993 – Shampoohorn
- 1996 – Music for Pets

=== With Zappa Plays Zappa ===
- 2008 – Zappa Plays Zappa
- 2010 – Return of the Son of...
- 2011 – In the Moment
- 2012 – F.O.H.
- 2012 – F.O.H. III: Out of Obscurity
- 2017 – Live In The Moment II

=== Guest appearances ===
- 1984 – Guitar solos "Sharleena" and "Stevie's Spanking" on Frank Zappa's Them or Us
- 1984 – Guitar on Frank Zappa's You Can't Do That on Stage Anymore, Vol. 3 (album) on "Sharleena"
- 1985 – Vocals on Frank Zappa's Frank Zappa Meets the Mothers of Prevention
- 1986 – Guitar solo on "Whipping Post" on Frank Zappa's Does Humor Belong in Music?
- 1986 – Guitar solo on Don Johnson's song "The Last Sound Love Makes" and appearance in the video for "Heartbeat"
- 1988 – Winger on "Seventeen" and "Purple Haze"
- 1989 – With sister Moon Unit, contributed the track "(In Love) With You Gumby" to the novelty album Gumby
- 1990 – Opening and outro solos on Extreme's Pornograffitti on the song "He-Man Woman Hater"
- 1992 – Lead guitar on "Diva Fever" on Spinal Tap's Break Like the Wind
- 1993 – Lead guitar on "Dirty Love" and "Chunga's Revenge" on Zappa's Universe tribute
- 1994 – Co-lead guitar on "Chewing on Crayons"" on Blues Saraceno's Hairpick
- 1994 – Barks on the track "Waffenspiel" on Frank Zappa's Civilization Phaze III
- 1997 – Guitar solo on Pat Boone's cover of "Smoke on the Water" (the No More Mr. Nice Guy album)
- 1997 – Guitar on the song "Quando M'en Vo" from Giacomo Puccini, in the musical project "Angelica"
- 2000 – Guitar on Dixie Dregs's California Screamin CD performing "Peaches en Regalia"
- 2001 – Guitar on Kip Winger's solo album Songs from the Ocean Floor
- 2001 – Bumblefoot's album 9.11, on "Top of the World"
- 2003 – "Weird Al" Yankovic's Poodle Hat album, on "Genius in France"
- 2004 – Lead guitar on "Time Heals" on Todd Rundgren's "Hello, It's Me And My Friends"
- 2005 – Guitar on "Surf Punks" on the soundtrack to the game "Conker: Live & Reloaded"
- 2006 – Lead guitar on "Chunga's Revenge" and "Bavarian Sunset" on Frank Zappa's Trance-Fusion
- 2011 – Electric guitar on "Gypsy Flee" from "A Kiss Before You Go" album By Norwegian band Katzenjammer
- 2011 – Solo guitar on "Release the Memes" from Centrifugal Satz Clock: Morning, by Steve Kusaba
- 2013 – Solo guitar on "Mind Your Step" from Freak Guitar: The Smorgasbord, by Mattias IA Eklundh
- 2023 – Guitar on "Is My Dick Enough (feat. Dweezil Zappa)" by Steel Panther
