= Moon Zappa =

American actress and author (born 1967)

- Born: Moon Unit Zappa; September 28, 1967 (age 59); New York City, U.S.
- Occupations: Actress; author
- Years active: 1982–present
- Spouse: Paul Doucette (m. 2002; div. 2014)
- Children: 1
- Parent(s): Frank Zappa; Gail Zappa
- Relatives: Dweezil Zappa (brother); Ahmet Zappa (brother); Diva Zappa (sister)

Moon Unit Zappa (born September 28, 1967) is an American actress, singer, and author. She is a daughter of musician Frank Zappa.

== Early life ==
Moon Zappa was born in New York City, the eldest child of Gail (née Sloatman) and musician Frank Zappa. She has three younger siblings: Dweezil, Ahmet, and Diva. Zappa's father was of Sicilian, Greek-Arab, and French ancestry, and her mother was of German and Portuguese descent. Zappa attended Oakwood School in North Hollywood, California.

== Career ==
Zappa first came to public attention in 1982 at the age of 14, when she appeared on her father's hit single "Valley Girl". The song featured Moon's monologue in "valleyspeak", slang terms popular with teenage girls in the San Fernando Valley, Los Angeles. "Valley Girl" was Frank Zappa's biggest hit in the United States, and popularized phrases from the lyric such as "grody to the max" (extremely gross, coming from grotty) and "gag me with a spoon" (strong disgust, coming from forced throwing up). The song appeared on her father's 1982 album Ship Arriving Too Late to Save a Drowning Witch.

In the mid-1980s, Zappa and her brother Dweezil were frequent guest VJs on MTV.

She sang on Dweezil's songs "My Mother Is a Space Cadet" b/w "Crunchy Water" in 1982 and "Let's Talk About It" from the album Havin' a Bad Day in 1986.

As a teenager, Zappa acted in the television series CHiPs, The Facts of Life, and the film Nightmares. While still 18, she was a technical consultant and appeared in several episodes of Fast Times. As an adult, she has worked as a stand-up comic, magazine writer, and actress, appearing in the films National Lampoon's European Vacation and Spirit of '76, the television sitcom Normal Life, and The Super Mario Bros. Super Show.

Zappa appeared as a niqab-clad Muslim woman in an episode of Curb Your Enthusiasm, as Ted Mosby's cousin Stacy in an episode of How I Met Your Mother, and on an episode ("Pampered to a Pulp") of Roseanne. In 2013, Zappa was the voice of Mrs. Lamber on FOX Broadcasting's Animation Domination High-Def series High School USA!.

In 2000, Zappa appeared as guest vocalist on Kip Winger's third solo album Songs from the Ocean Floor. She is the author of the novel America, the Beautiful, published in 2001. She has also written for The New York Times. In a 2016 interview with the Los Angeles Times, Zappa said she was working on a book about growing up in her "crazy house".

Zappa's memoir, Earth to Moon, was released in August 2024.

== Personal life ==
Zappa married Paul Doucette, drummer and rhythm guitarist for American pop group Matchbox Twenty, in June 2002. They have one child, Mathilda Plum Doucette. They divorced in 2014.

Following the death of Zappa's mother, Gail, in October 2015, it was revealed that her siblings Ahmet and Diva were given control of the Zappa family trust with shares of 30% each, while Moon and her brother Dweezil were given smaller shares of 20% each. Speaking to the Los Angeles Times in 2016, Zappa called it "the most hideous shock of [her] life." As beneficiaries only, Moon and Dweezil will reportedly not receive any distributions from the trust until it is profitable—as of 2016, it was millions of dollars in debt—and must seek permission from Ahmet, the trustee, to make money from their father's music or merchandise bearing his name.

In 2018, the Zappa siblings were reported to have legally reconciled their differences, with Dweezil noting "It may be a bumpy road at times—we are a passionate Italian family—but we have decided to work toward privately discussing issues rather than using public forums and lawyers."

== Filmography ==
=== Film ===
Year	Title	Role	Notes
1983	Nightmares	Pamela	
1985	National Lampoon's European Vacation	Rusty's California Girl	
1985	The Boys Next Door	Nancy	
1987	Heartbeat	Band Performer	Direct-to-video
1989	Listen to Me	Longnecker	
1989	Heartstopper	Lenora Clayton	
1990	The Spirit of '76	Cheryl Dickman	
1992	Little Sister	Venus	
1994	Dark Side of Genius	Carrie	
1996	Love Always	Mary Ellen	
1997	The Girl Gets Moe	Hostess Jillian	
1997	Pterodactyl Woman from Beverly Hills	Susie	
1998	Anarchy TV	Katie	
1998	Jack Frost	School Teacher	Uncredited
2000	Brutal Truth	Alex	
2000	Behind the Seams	Astric	
2010	Love & Distrust	Donna	Direct-to-video
2011	Last Will	Belinda DeNovi	

=== Television ===
Year	Title	Role	Notes
1982	CHiPs	Tami	Episode: "Speedway Fever"
1985	The Facts of Life	Sondra	Episode: "The Last Drive-In"
1986	Fast Times	Barbara	6 episodes
1987	Student Exchange	Murphy the Biker	Television film
1989	The Super Mario Bros. Super Show!	Marilyn	Episode: "Wild Thing"
1990	Normal Life	Tess Harlow	13 episodes
1991	The Trials of Rosie O'Neill	Janet Franey	Episode: "Wolf Pack"
1993	Wild Palms	Judy	Episode: "Hungry Ghosts"
1996	Murder One	Chris	Episode: "Chapter Seventeen"
1996	Clueless	Taki	Episode: "Do We with Bad Haircuts Not Feel?"
1996	Roseanne	Carol	Episode: "Pampered to a Pulp"
1997	Party of Five	Merika	Episode: "Adjustments"
2000	Tenacious D	Art Gallery Visitor	Episode: "The Fan"
2003	The Complete Master Works	Art Gallery Visitor	Video documentary
2004	Curb Your Enthusiasm	Haboos	Episode: "The Blind Date"
2006	How I Met Your Mother	Stacy	Episode: "How Lily Stole Christmas"
2007	Private Practice	Jenny	Episode: "In Which We Meet Addison, a Nice Girl from Somewhere Else"
2010	Grey's Anatomy	Kelly	Episode: "Push"
2013	High School USA!	Tracey Lamber (voice)	5 episodes
