= Barking Pumpkin Records =

Record label

Barking Pumpkin Records is an American record label founded by Frank Zappa in 1981. Zappa named the label after his wife's smoker's cough when she tried to quit the habit. Barking Pumpkin was initially distributed by CBS Records.

== History ==
Zappa had founded the Zappa Records label in 1977, and formed a deal with Phonogram Inc., to distribute the label in the United States and Canada. Its first releases were the (mostly) live album Sheik Yerbouti, followed by the dystopian rock opera Joe's Garage. Phonogram refused to distribute the single I Don't Wanna Get Drafted in the US, though they did distribute it in Canada. The song's lyrics criticized president Jimmy Carter's reintroduction of the military draft. Zappa later released the single independently in the US in early 1980.

After spending most of 1980 on the road, Zappa founded Barking Pumpkin and released the album Tinsel Town Rebellion in 1981. Also in 1981 the label released three individual volumes in the Shut Up 'n Play Yer Guitar series which were initially sold only in the United States by mail order.

In 1984 Zappa intended to move Barking Pumpkin distribution to MCA Records. Thing-Fish was produced as a test pressing by MCA. However, MCA cancelled the contract after a woman in the quality control department became offended by the album's content. A deal was then made with EMI, which allowed Them or Us and Thing-Fish to be distributed by Capitol Records in the United States.

In response to the conflict with MCA, Zappa created a sarcastic "Warning/Guarantee" notice which appeared on these albums, as well as Frank Zappa Meets the Mothers of Prevention. The warning said that the album "contains content which a truly free society would neither fear nor suppress", and the guarantee claimed that the lyrics would "not cause eternal torment in the place where the guy with the horns and pointed stick conducts his business".

Dweezil Zappa released his debut album Havin' a Bad Day on Barking Pumpkin in 1986. After an album on another label, he released Confessions on Barking Pumpkin in 1991, and formed the group Z, with Ahmet Zappa, releasing Shampoohorn on Barking Pumpkin.

Two more albums, Frank Zappa Plays the Music of Frank Zappa: A Memorial Tribute and Quaudiophiliac, were released posthumously by Barking Pumpkin in 1996 and 2004, along with the previously unreleased album Everything Is Healing Nicely in 1999.

In 2012, the Zappa Family Trust regained control of Frank Zappa's recorded music catalog and made a distribution arrangement with Universal Music Enterprises to reissue the Zappa catalog on the Zappa and Barking Pumpkin labels.

== Artists ==
Former

Artist	Year(s) signed	Albums released on Barking Pumpkin	Notes
Frank Zappa	—	21	Died December 4, 1993 (aged 52), due to prostate cancer.
Dweezil Zappa	1986–1988; 1991–1994	2	Son of Frank Zappa. Has since released albums on Chrysalis, Favored Nations and Zappa Records.
Z	1994	1	Consists of Dweezil and Ahmet Zappa, sons of Frank Zappa. Released one more album on Zappa Records.
