= Utility Muffin Research Kitchen =

Recording studio in California

Coordinates: 34.12267°N 118.36818°W

The Utility Muffin Research Kitchen (UMRK) is a recording studio built in 1979 by musician, composer, songwriter, and bandleader Frank Zappa at his home in Los Angeles, California. The home was later owned by Lady Gaga and by Elizabeth Jagger.

== History ==
Frank Zappa built the studio in his 6,759-square-foot home in Laurel Canyon, completing it on September 1, 1979. The studio was custom designed and constructed by Rudi Breuer with input from Zappa and his technical staff. The estimated construction costs ranged between $1.5 and $3.5 million. The name of the studio came from a location in one of Zappa's songs; "Muffin Man" from the album Bongo Fury. The concept of a "Utility Muffin Research Kitchen" also appeared in Zappa's rock opera, Joe's Garage, with the plot ending with the protagonist, Joe, giving in to conformity and getting a job at the Utility Muffin Research Kitchen, where he decorates muffins with icing rosettes; the narration describing his job there is nearly identical to the opening narration from "Muffin Man".

Soon after the studio was completed, Ken Scott engineered the four-song debut EP by Missing Persons at UMRK. In 1982 two tracks from the EP were re-issued on the band's debut studio album, Spring Session M.

In July, 1980, Zappa began recording at the UMRK several songs that were eventually released on the album You Are What You Is. Zappa would use the studio regularly until his death in 1993.

In 2016, Lady Gaga purchased the Zappa home, including the Utility Muffin Research Kitchen. It is one of the studios she used for the recording of her sixth album, Chromatica. In 2021 the house was sold to Elizabeth Jagger.

== UMRK Mobile ==
The UMRK Mobile Studio was a remote recording bus purchased from Mike Love of the Beach Boys. The studio bus needed extensive repairs and upgrades after years of sitting idle at Love's home. The mobile studio was used in the first cable TV / FM "Simulcast" for Zappa's Halloween show on October 31, 1981. The show was broadcast live on MTV from the Palladium in New York City, with the audio-only portion broadcast over FM's new "Starfleet Radio" network. The broadcast was engineered from the UMRK bus by Zappa's longtime audio engineer Mark G. Pinske.
