= Ahmet Zappa =

American musician and writer (born 1974)

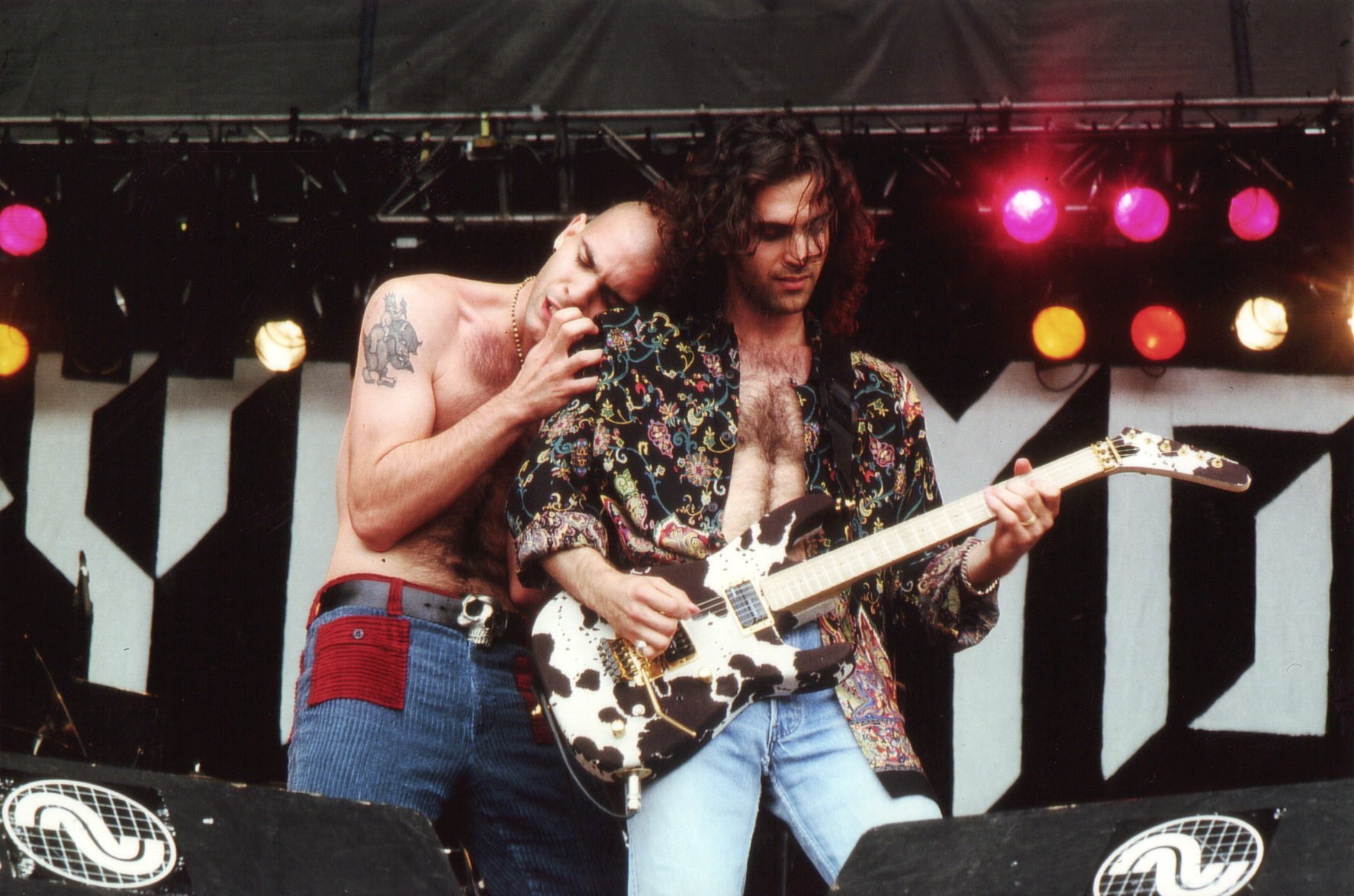
- Ahmet and Dweezil Zappa in 1993

Background information
- Born: Ahmet Emuukha Rodan Zappa; May 15, 1974 (age 52); Los Angeles, California, U.S.
- Occupations: Musician; actor; writer; producer; publisher

Ahmet Emuukha Rodan Zappa (born May 15, 1974) is an American musician, writer, actor and trustee of the Zappa Family Trust.

== Early life ==
Ahmet Zappa was born in Los Angeles, California, the third of four children born to musician Frank Zappa and businesswoman Gail Zappa. His father was of Sicilian, Greek, Arab, and French descent, and his mother was of German and Portuguese ancestry. He is said to be named after music executive Ahmet Ertegun (co-founder and president of Atlantic Records), whom his father greatly admired. This is contradicted by Neil Slaven in Electric Don Quixote: The Definitive Story Of Frank Zappa, who notes:

His first name was that of an imaginary person we always had hanging around back when we had no one on our payroll," Gail told Victoria Balfour. "We'd snap our fingers and say, 'Ahmet? Dishes. Coffee, please.' He was also named Rodan after a giant pterodactyl that would have ravaged the world if the Japanese film director Ishiro Honda hadn't destroyed it in 1957.

His older brother and sister are Dweezil Zappa and Moon Zappa, and his younger sister is Diva Zappa.

== Career ==
Ahmet Zappa has released several albums with his brother Dweezil, and wrote the song "Frogs with Dirty Little Lips" with his father.

He has appeared in several feature films and television programs. In the late 1990s, he appeared on Channel 4 UK's The Adam and Joe Show, in a regular segment called "Vinyl Justice", in which hosts Adam Buxton and Joe Cornish, dressed as policemen, examined his vinyl collection for "criminal records". In 2000, he appeared in the film Ready to Rumble. With his brother Dweezil, he performed a cover of Britney Spears' song "...Baby One More Time" for the film's soundtrack. Other appearances include hosting the TV shows Robotica and But Can They Sing?

In July 2006, Zappa saw the release of his debut novel, entitled The Monstrous Memoirs of a Mighty McFearless, aimed at younger readers. The rights to a movie were purchased by Bruckheimer Films and Disney. The movie is in production with screenwriter Tim Firth assisting; no release date has been announced.

On October 19, 2006, The Jim Henson Company announced it had hired Zappa to write a treatment for a feature film version of the hit 1980s television show Fraggle Rock. He is also writing a sequel to The Monstrous Memoirs of a Mighty McFearless, which had also been optioned to adapt to a screenplay. Zappa proposed to Disney's studio head Bob Iger that the company form a graphic novel-to-film division; the result was "Disney's Kingdom Comics." Zappa was also given a first-look deal at Walt Disney Studios for motion picture productions. His company is called Monsterfoot Productions. His first film, The Odd Life of Timothy Green, was released in 2012 by Walt Disney Pictures, and starred Jennifer Garner and Joel Edgerton.

Following the death of Zappa's mother, Gail, in October 2015, it was revealed that Ahmet and his sister Diva were given control of the Zappa Family Trust with shares of 30% each, while his siblings Moon and Dweezil were given smaller shares of 20% each. As beneficiaries only, Moon and Dweezil will not see any money from the trust until it is profitable—in 2016, it was "millions of dollars in debt"—and must seek permission from Ahmet, the trustee, to make money from their father's music or merchandise bearing his name. The uneven divide of the trust has resulted in several conflicts between Zappa's children, including a feud between Dweezil and Ahmet over Dweezil's use of his father's music in live performances.

Under Ahmet's direction, the trust proposed a trademark on the name Zappa, which would prevent Dweezil from using the name for commercial purposes without authorization. Since 2006, Dweezil toured with an act called Zappa Plays Zappa, playing his father's music. The trust sought to collect a fee from Dweezil for continued use of the name, as well as proceeds from merchandise sold at Zappa Plays Zappa concerts. In response to the trust's action, Dweezil renamed his performance series "50 Years of Frank: Dweezil Zappa Plays Whatever the F@%k He Wants—the Cease and Desist Tour." In more recent times, the Zappa siblings have legally reconciled their differences with Dweezil noting "It may be a bumpy road at times – we are a passionate Italian family – but we have decided to work toward privately discussing issues rather than using public forums and lawyers."

== Personal life ==
Zappa married actress Selma Blair on January 24, 2004, at Carrie Fisher's mansion in Beverly Hills, California. Blair filed for divorce at the Los Angeles Superior Court on June 21, 2006, citing irreconcilable differences.

Zappa is married to Shana Muldoon, sister of TV actor Patrick Muldoon. Together they have one daughter and one son.

== Discography ==
- Confessions (1991)
- Shampoohorn (1994)
- Music for Pets (1996)

== Filmography ==
- Pump Up the Volume (1990) – Jaime
- Anarchy TV (1998) - Officer Sweitzer
- Jack Frost (1998) – Snow plow driver
- Children of the Corn V: Fields of Terror (1998) – Laszlo
- Roseanne (1998) -- Waiter/Past Lives Assistant
- Ready to Rumble (2000) – Cashier
- Gen^{13} (2000) – Additional Voices (voice)
- The Odd Life of Timothy Green (2012) – story by and producer
- Cheaper Than Cheap (2025) – producer

== Television ==
- 2 Hip 4 Tv – Host (1988)
- Roseanne (1994)
- webRIOT – host (1999)
- Happy Hour – host (1999)
- Robotica – host for three seasons (2001–2002)
- But Can They Sing? – host (2005)
- Head Case Ep No. 105 (Parental Guidance Required) – Starz Channel Original Series – self (2008)
