= Meat Light =

Meat Light: The Uncle Meat Project/Object Audio Documentary

Compilation album by Frank Zappa
- Released: November 4, 2016
- Recorded: October 1967 – February 1968 (liner notes go into great equipment detail)
- Genre: Rock
- Length: 207:36
- Label: Zappa Records; Catalog Number: ZR20024
- Producer: Gail Zappa, Joe Travers

Frank Zappa chronology
ZAPPAtite (2016)	Meat Light: The Uncle Meat Project/Object Audio Documentary (2016)	Chicago '78 (2016)

Meat Light: The Uncle Meat Project/Object Audio Documentary is a 3CD compilation of Frank Zappa's Uncle Meat recordings. It is project/object #5 in a series of 40th Anniversary FZ Audio Documentaries, following MOFO (2006), Lumpy Money (2009), Greasy Love Songs (2010) and The Crux of the Biscuit (2016).

The album includes the original 1969 vinyl mix of Uncle Meat (without the film excerpts and "Tengo na minchia tanta" which were added to the CD release in 1987), followed by the originally planned sequence of the tracks (which includes different edits and a longer version of the track "Cops & Buns" from The Lost Episodes) and outtakes.

== Track listing ==
Disc one: Original 1969 Vinyl Mix
No.	Title	Length
1.	"Uncle Meat: Main Title Theme"	1:56
2.	"The Voice of Cheese"	0:26
3.	"Nine Types of Industrial Pollution"	6:02
4.	"Zolar Czackl"	0:54
5.	"Dog Breath, in the Year of the Plague"	3:59
6.	"The Legend of the Golden Arches"	3:27
7.	"Louie Louie (At the Royal Albert Hall in London)"	2:18
8.	"The Dog Breath Variations"	1:50
9.	"Sleeping in a Jar"	0:50
10.	"Our Bizarre Relationship"	1:05
11.	"The Uncle Meat Variations"	4:46
12.	"Electric Aunt Jemima"	1:46
13.	"Prelude to King Kong"	3:39
14.	"God Bless America (Live at the Whisky A Go Go)"	1:10
15.	"A Pound for a Brown on the Bus"	1:29
16.	"Ian Underwood Whips It Out (Live on stage in Copenhagen)"	5:09
17.	"Mr. Green Genes"	3:13
18.	"We Can Shoot You"	2:03
19.	"“If We’d All Been Living in California...”"	1:14
20.	"The Air"	2:57
21.	"Project X"	4:49
22.	"Cruising for Burgers"	2:18
23.	"King Kong Itself (as played by the Mothers in a studio)"	0:51
24.	"King Kong (its magnificence as interpreted by Dom DeWild)"	1:19
25.	"King Kong (as Motorhead explains it)"	1:45
26.	"King Kong (the Gardner Varieties)"	6:14
27.	"King Kong (as played by 3 deranged Good Humor Trucks)"	0:37
28.	"King Kong (live on a flat bed diesel in the middle of a race track at a Miami Pop Festival... the Underwood ramifications)"	7:24

Disc two: Original Sequence
No.	Title	Length
1.	"Dog Breath, In The Year Of The Plague"	2:55
2.	"The Legend Of The Golden Arches"	3:16
3.	"The Voice Of Cheese"	0:26
4.	"Whiskey Wah"	1:34
5.	"Nine Types Of Industrial Pollution"	6:03
6.	"Louie Louie (Live at the Royal Albert Hall in London)"	2:27
7.	"The Dog Breath Variations"	1:51
8.	"Shoot You Percussion Item"	1:28
9.	"The Whip"	5:03
10.	"The Uncle Meat Variations"	4:47
11.	"King Kong"	10:46
12.	"Project X Minus .5"	1:47
13.	"A Pound For A Brown On The Bus"	1:29
14.	"Electric Aunt Jemima"	1:46
15.	"Prelude To King Kong"	3:39
16.	"God Bless America (Live at the Whiskey A Go Go)"	1:11
17.	"Sleeping In A Jar"	0:51
18.	"Cops & Buns"	5:56
19.	"Zolar Czakl"	0:47

Disc three: Original Sequence (continued)
No.	Title	Length
1.	"We Can Not Shoot You"	1:16
2.	"Mr. Green Genes"	3:13
3.	"“PooYeahrg”"	0:32
4.	"Uncle Meat: Main Title Theme"	1:27
5.	"Our Bizarre Relationship"	1:10
6.	"“Later We Can Shoot You”"	0:15
7.	"“If We’d All Been Living In California…”"	1:19
8.	"‘Ere Ian Whips It/JCB Spits It/Motorhead Rips It"	2:30
9.	"The Air"	2:58
10.	"Project X .5"	2:38
11.	"Cruising For Burgers"	2:23

From the Vault
No.	Title	Length
12.	"“A Bunch Of Stuff”"	1:40
13.	"Dog Breath (Single Version - Stereo)"	2:55
14.	"Tango"	0:24
15.	"The String Quartet*"	3:06
16.	"Electric Aunt Jemima (Mix Outtake)"	1:40
17.	"Exercise 4 Variant"	4:32
18.	"Zolar Czackl (Mix Outtake)"	0:45
19.	"“More Beer!”"	0:17
20.	"Green Genes Snoop"	1:13
21.	"Mr. Green Genes (Mix Outtake)"	3:11
22.	"Echo Pie"	2:16
23.	"1/4 Tone Unit"	1:06
24.	"Sakuji’s March"	0:35
25.	"No. 4*"	1:52
26.	"Prelude To King Kong (Extended Version)*"	5:24
27.	"Blood Unit*"	1:22
28.	"My Guitar (Proto I- Excerpt)*"	2:12
29.	"Nine Types Of Industrial Pollution (Guitar track, normal speed)"	9:53
30.	"Uncle Meat (Live at Columbia University 1969)"	4:44
31.	"Dog Breath (Instrumental)*"	2:50
32.	"The Dog Breath Variations (Mix Outtake)"	1:46

- * indicates track is mono

== Personnel ==
- Frank Zappa — guitar, vocals, percussion
- Ray Collins — vocals
- Jimmy Carl Black — drums
- Roy Estrada — electric bass, falsetto
- Don Preston — electric piano
- Billy Mundi — drums on some pieces
- Bunk Gardner — piccolo, flute, clarinet, bass clarinet, soprano sax, alto sax, tenor sax, bassoon
- Ian Underwood — electric organ, piano, harpsichord, celeste, flute, clarinet, alto sax, baritone sax
- Art Tripp — drums, timpani, vibes, marimba, xylophone, wood blocks, bells, small chimes
- Euclid James Sherwood — tenor sax, tambourine
- Ruth Komanoff — marimba, vibes
- Nelcy Walker — vocals on "Dog Breath" and "The Uncle Meat Variations"
- Theodore Holdt — Cover and interior art on CDs and book.
