= Zappa '66 Vol. 1: Live at TTG Studios =

Live album by Frank Zappa
- Released: May 15, 2026
- Recorded: October 1966; September 1966 (interviews)
- Studios: TTG Studios, Los Angeles, CA
- Length: 78:33
- Label: Vaulternative Records
- Producers: Frank Zappa (original recordings); Joe Travers (for release)

Frank Zappa chronology
Bongo Fury 50th Anniversary Edition (2026)	Zappa '66 Vol. 1: Live at TTG Studios (2026)	Freak Out! 60th Anniversary Edition (2026)

Zappa '66 Vol. 1: Live at TTG Studios is a live album by Frank Zappa with the Mothers of Invention, produced by Joe Travers, released on CD and double LP on May 15, 2026, by Vaulternative Records (the first release on the label since Chicago '78 in 2016). It was recorded in October 1966 at TTG Studios in Los Angeles, California. The album also includes interview segments taken from "Santa Barbara Interview Put-On", recorded circa September 1966. The album "showcases the only known recording of guitarist Del Casher’s short-lived stint in The Mothers, as well as the earliest recorded appearances of percussionist Billy Mundi and keyboardist Don Preston, both newly added to the lineup at the time."

== Track listing ==
All tracks are written by Frank Zappa except "Story Untold" by Leroy Griffin.

No.	Title	Length
1.	"'Hello There'"	0:36
2.	"Freak Chouflee'"	14:07
3.	"Move On"	3:45
4.	"FZ & the United Mutations"	2:06
5.	"'Tommy, Come Back!'"	3:23
6.	"FZ Directs the Freaks"	1:38
7.	"Pomp and Circumstance Sequence"	1:31
8.	"Legalize Abortion"	3:17
9.	"Twistin' Again"	1:33
10.	"The Electric Banana"	5:59
11.	"I Could Be a Slave / Story Untold"	7:20
12.	"'We Keep Changing Personnel Though'"	4:16
13.	"A2 Jam"	4:13
14.	"Khaki Sack - Prototype"	9:29
15.	"Duke of Prunes (Edited)"	3:27
16.	"Victory Through Vegetables"	10:19
17.	"'We're Havin' a Freak Out!'"	1:33
Total length:		78:33

== Personnel ==
=== Players ===
- Frank Zappa – guitar, vocals
- Ray Collins – vocals, tambourine
- Del Casher – guitar
- Don Preston – keyboards, percussion
- Roy Estrada – bass
- Jimmy Carl Black – drums, percussion
- Billy Mundi – drums, percussion

=== Additional musicians ===
- The United Mutations – special guests
- Mike Cole – interviewer

=== Production ===
- Joe Travers – Vaultmeister, liner notes, digital transfers, sequence and editing
- John Polito – mastering
- Michael Mesker – package design
- Earl Leaf – photography
- Michael Ochs – photography
- Barry Feinstein – film stills
- Holland Greco – A&R
- Maria McKenna – production manager
- Ashley Slater – product manager
- Tim Plumley – UMe PR
