= Ahead of Their Time =

Live album by The Mothers of Invention
- Released: March 23, 1993
- Recorded: October 25, 1968
- Genres: Jazz fusion; progressive rock; art rock; experimental rock
- Length: 67:39
- Label: Barking Pumpkin
- Producer: Frank Zappa

Frank Zappa chronology
| Playground Psychotics (1992) | Ahead of Their Time (1993) | The Yellow Shark (1993) |

The Mothers of Invention chronology
| Playground Psychotics (1992) | Ahead of Their Time (1993) | Carnegie Hall (2011) |

Professional ratings
Review scores
| Source | Rating |
|---|---|
| AllMusic | 3/5 stars |

Ahead of Their Time is a live album by The Mothers of Invention. It was recorded at the Royal Festival Hall, London, England, on October 25, 1968, and released in 1993 on CD by Barking Pumpkin. It was reissued on Rykodisc in 1995.

== Performances ==
The first part of the set is a one-off performance of a musical play retrospectively entitled Progress?, and featuring members of the BBC Symphony Orchestra. Portions of this performance originally found their way on to the second Mystery Disc (released in 1986 as part of the box set The Old Masters Box Two and issued as an individual album in 1998) and the Honker Home Video release of Uncle Meat (1989). Much of the humour and storyline of the play is lost to the casual listener due to primitive recording techniques and the visual nature of some of the performance, necessitating extensive liner notes by Zappa.

According to Zappa's liner notes, the remainder of the set is "A fair – not outstanding – 1968 Mothers of Invention rock concert performance". Different edits of snatches from the second part of the performance ("The Orange County Lumber Truck" and "Prelude to the Afternoon of a Sexually Aroused Gas Mask") were originally released on Weasels Ripped My Flesh (1970).

== Track listing ==
All music is composed by Frank Zappa. All words are written by Frank Zappa except where noted.

"Progress?"
| No. | Title | Writer(s) | Length |
|---|---|---|---|
| 1. | "Prologue" (Bogus Pomp) | | 3:07 |
| 2. | "Progress?" | Preston, Underwood, Gardner, Tripp, Sherwood & FZ | 4:44 |
| 3. | "Like It or Not" | | 2:21 |
| 4. | "The Jimmy Carl Black Philosophy Lesson" | Black & FZ | 2:01 |
| 5. | "Holding the Group Back" | Estrada, Underwood & FZ | 2:00 |
| 6. | "Holiday in Berlin" | | 0:56 |
| 7. | "The Rejected Mexican Pope Leaves the Stage" | | 2:55 |
| 8. | "Undaunted, the Band Plays On" | | 4:34 |
| 9. | "Agency Man" | | 3:17 |
| 10. | "Epilogue" | | 1:52 |

1968 performance
| No. | Title | Original album | Length |
|---|---|---|---|
| 11. | "King Kong" | Uncle Meat | 8:13 |
| 12. | "Help, I'm a Rock" | Freak Out! | 1:38 |
| 13. | "Transylvania Boogie" | Chunga's Revenge | 3:07 |
| 14. | "Pound for a Brown" | Uncle Meat | 6:50 |
| 15. | "Sleeping in a Jar" | Uncle Meat | 2:24 |
| 16. | "Let's Make the Water Turn Black" | We're Only in It for the Money | 1:51 |
| 17. | "Harry, You're a Beast" | We're Only in It for the Money | 0:53 |
| 18. | "The Orange County Lumber Truck (Part I)" | Weasels Ripped My Flesh | 0:46 |
| 19. | "Oh No" | Lumpy Gravy | 3:22 |
| 20. | "The Orange County Lumber Truck (Part II)" | Weasels Ripped My Flesh | 10:36 |

== Personnel ==
=== The Musicians ===
- Frank Zappa – guitar & vocals
- Ian Underwood – alto sax & piano
- Bunk Gardner – tenor sax & clarinet
- Euclid James Motorhead Sherwood – baritone sax & tambourine
- Roy Estrada – bass & vocals
- Don Preston – electric piano & odd noises; home-made oscillator boxes
- Arthur Dyer Tripp III – drums & percussion
- Jimmy Carl Black – drums
- Assisted by members of the BBC Symphony Orchestra

=== Production ===
- Frank Zappa – producer, arranger; writer; liner notes
- Bob Stone – re-mix engineer
- Cal Schenkel – cover art
