= Uncle Meat (film) =

1987 film by Frank Zappa

- Directed by: Frank Zappa
- Written by: Frank Zappa
- Cinematography: Ed Seeman; Haskell Wexler
- Music by: Frank Zappa
- Release date: 1987
- Running time: 100 minutes
- Country: United States
- Language: English

Uncle Meat is a 1987 film written and directed by Frank Zappa, released on home video (VHS only, no Betamax was made available). It was conceived in 1968 as a vehicle for the Mothers of Invention, but remained unfinished until 20 years after the production began.

== Plot ==
The film has been described as an unfinished "non-movie", consisting of three distinct plots, the first of which has been described as "Zappa filming Zappa filming". In the second plotline, a musician named Biff Debris (Don Preston) becomes obsessed with trying to produce a hit single, ultimately failing to achieve his objective before he gets old (and is now played by Stumuk, replacing Preston). The third plot is a love story between Phyllis Altenhaus and Debris as Phyllis works as an operator who falls in love with Debris while watching a video of a 1968 music performance by Debris. Years after, they meet and live happily ever after.

== Cast ==
- Phyllis Smith Altenhaus as herself and also sometimes as Sheba Flieschman (as Phyllis Altenhaus)
- Don Preston as himself (a.k.a. Dom DeWilde) and also sometimes as Biff Debris but most frequently as Uncle Meat
- Frank Zappa as himself/The Imaginary Director
- Carl Zappa as Young Minnesota Tishman
- Aynsley Dunbar as himself/Biff Junior
- Ray Collins as himself/Bill Yards
- Meredith Monk as Red Face Girl
- Massimo Bassoli as Adult Minnesota Tishman
- C. Mercedes Lewis as Girl Who Was A Sofa
- Francesca Fisher as The Countess
- Billy Mundi as Rollo
- Stumuk as Elderly Biff Debris
- Dick Barber as himself
- Rodney Bingenheimer as himself
- Jimmy Carl Black as himself
- Roy Estrada as himself
- Bunk Gardner as himself
- Buzz Gardner as himself
- Lowell George as himself
- Dick Kunc as himself
- Manfred Lerch as himself
- Sal Lombardo as himself
- Janet Neville-Ferguson as herself
- Fritz Rau as himself
- Linda Ronstadt as herself
- Cal Schenkel as himself
- Euclid James 'Motorhead' Sherwood as himself
- Arthur Dyer Tripp III as himself
- Ian Underwood as himself
- Haskell Wexler as himself
- Tom Wilson as himself
- Annie Zannas as herself

== Production ==
In 1968 Zappa decided to make a film featuring the original incarnation of the Mothers of Invention. Haskell Wexler, who had used two of Zappa's songs in his film Medium Cool, offered five days of his services as a cinematographer for free to Zappa. The film remained unfinished at the time that the Uncle Meat album was released in April 1969. Financial issues led to the production stopping and Zappa moved on to other projects.

Zappa said in 1983 that he was finally able to resume work on the film for the first time in several years. This was because it had been tied up in a lawsuit. The film had been locked up in a storage vault controlled by "another person", which Zappa did not name. The unnamed person was presumably his former manager Herb Cohen.

A version of the Uncle Meat film was released direct-to-video in 1987. Principal photography having never been completed, the VHS videocassette release is a "making of" documentary showing rehearsals and background footage from 1968 and interviews with people involved with the uncompleted production.

=== Style ===
Uncle Meat juxtaposes concert footage from the Festival Hall in London with a fictional narrative that combines elements of science fiction and road stories inspired by the band's sexual escapades. The second plotline serves as a criticism of the music industry, portraying the efforts of a musician to gain commercial success; this plotline is a political thriller. The film utilizes footage from 1968, 1970 and 1982, as well as studio and live recordings from different concerts and years, which allowed Zappa to complete the film, which reflects on the existence and validity of his music over the course of time.

As in Zappa's previous film, 200 Motels, Uncle Meat explores the separation between documentary and fiction, encouraging the viewer to question whether they are watching real or recreated events. Zappa explores the difficulty of maintaining a career in film as an independent artist outside of the studio system. Having taken 20 years to complete the film, the screenplay had changed from what Zappa had initially planned, due to him adding footage to the project throughout the 20 year production. The character of Biff Debris serves as an allegory for the tensions faced by an artist trying to have his work released. While the dialogue of 200 Motels emphasizes that the film is Zappa's, Uncle Meat is more distinctively the Mothers of Invention's film.

== Media ==
The April 26, 1969 Billboard review of the Uncle Meat album described it as a soundtrack to a film. The double vinyl was expanded on compact disc to include 41 minutes of audio from the film and the song "Tengo na minchia tanta", programmed before side 4 of the original album on the second CD (sides 1-3 are on the first CD). Author Ben Watson said that the additional tracks were a detraction from the album's original structure.
