= The **** of the Mothers =

Album by The Mothers of Invention

The **** (Best) of the Mothers

Greatest hits album by The Mothers of Invention
- Released: October 1969
- Recorded: 1966–1968
- Genre: Progressive rock
- Length: 33:47
- Label: Verve; MGM
- Producer: Tom Wilson

The **** (Best) of the Mothers is an out-of-print compilation album of early works by The Mothers of Invention, an American rock band. The album features a gatefold featuring some of the contemporary band members such as Ian Underwood, Art Tripp, and Motorhead Sherwood. This was the first of numerous repackaged "Best Of" LPs put out by MGM that were not authorized by Frank Zappa; Mothermania is the only one that Zappa worked on and approved.

== Track listing ==
Side One
No.	Title	Length
1.	"Status Back Baby"	2:52
2.	"Wowie Zowie"	2:45
3.	"You Didn't Try to Call Me"	3:17
4.	"Invocation & Ritual Dance of the Young Pumpkin"	6:57
5.	"Soft-Sell Conclusions"	1:40

Side Two
No.	Title	Length
1.	"Bow-Tie Daddy"	1:22
2.	"Uncle Bernie's Farm"	2:09
3.	"Concentration Moon"	2:32
4.	"Go Cry on Somebody Else's Shoulder"	3:31
5.	"Flower Punk"	3:57
6.	"Motherly Love"	2:45

== Credits ==
- Frank Zappa – guitar, conductor, vocals
- Jimmy Carl Black – percussion, drums, vocals
- Ray Collins – harmonica, cymbals, sound effects, tambourine, vocals, finger cymbals
- Elliot Ingber – alternate lead and rhythm guitar
- Roy Estrada – bass, vocals, guitarron, soprano vocals
- Gene Estes – percussion
- Eugene Di Novi – piano
- Neil LeVang – guitar
- John Rotella – clarinet, sax
- Kurt Reher – cello
- Raymond Kelley – cello
- Paul Bergstrom – cello
- Emmet Sargeant – cello
- Joseph Saxon – cello
- Edwin V. Beach – cello
- Arthur Maebe – French horn, tuba
- George Price – French horn
- John Johnson – tuba
- Carol Kaye – 12-string guitar
- Virgil Evans – trumpet
- David Wells – trombone
- Kenneth Watson – percussion
- Plas Johnson – sax, flute
- Roy Caton – copyist
- Carl Franzoni – freak
- Vito – freak
- Kim Fowley – (featured on hypophone)
- Benjamin Barrett – contractor
- David Anderle
- Motorhead Sherwood – noises
- Mac Rebennack – piano
- Paul Butterfield
- Les McCann – piano

=== Production ===
- Producer: Tom Wilson
- Arranged and conducted by Frank Zappa
- Art direction: Sid Maurer
- Cover art: Abe Gurvin
