= Mothermania =

Greatest hits album by the Mothers of Invention
- Released: March 24, 1969
- Recorded: March 9, 1966 – October 1967
- Genre: Rock; experimental; avant-garde; doo-wop
- Length: 40:34
- Label: Bizarre/Verve
- Producer: Frank Zappa

Frank Zappa and the Mothers of Invention chronology
Cruising with Ruben & the Jets (1968)	Mothermania (1969)	Uncle Meat (1969)

Mothermania (1969), subtitled The Best of the Mothers, is a compilation album by the Mothers of Invention. While the songs were previously released on Freak Out!, Absolutely Free and We're Only in It for the Money, it contains unique mixes or edits made specifically for this compilation.

== Background ==
After the Mothers of Invention's contract with MGM and Verve Records expired, Frank Zappa and Herb Cohen negotiated to form a semi-independent record label Bizarre Records, with Verve releasing three Bizarre releases with distribution by MGM: a new Mothers of Invention album, Cruising with Ruben & the Jets, the compilation Mothermania, and an album by Sandy Hurvitz, Sandy's Album is Here at Last. Mothermania was prepared in order to recoup money which Verve felt it lost funding the Mothers of Invention albums Freak Out!, Absolutely Free and We're Only in It for the Money. Frank Zappa prepared the masters for the release, remixing and sequencing the track listing, as well as overseeing its packaging. The compilation was notable for featuring unique mixes or edits of the songs compiled for its release, including an uncensored version of "Mother People", which previously appeared on We're Only in It for the Money in a censored version, and a radically different mix of "The Idiot Bastard Son".

== Release, reception and aftermath ==
Professional ratings
Review scores
Source	Rating
Allmusic	3/5 stars

Mothermania was released shortly before the release of the Mothers of Invention's fifth studio album, Uncle Meat, a releasing tactic that Frank Zappa felt was intentional on the behalf of Verve. Zappa subsequently disowned the compilation following its release. Allmusic reviewer William Ruhlmann described the compilation as being "redundant", giving it three out of five stars. Verve would go on to produce further compilations, beginning with The **** of the Mothers which was released in the fall of 1969, without Zappa's involvement.

The album was out of print for a long time, but has since been officially reissued as a digital download in 2009, a CD in 2012, and an LP in 2019.

== Track listing ==
All tracks are written by Frank Zappa.

Side one
No.	Title	Original album	Length
1.	"Brown Shoes Don't Make It"	Absolutely Free	7:26
2.	"Mother People"	We're Only in It for the Money	1:41
3.	"Duke of Prunes"	Absolutely Free	5:09
4.	"Call Any Vegetable"	Absolutely Free	4:31
5.	"The Idiot Bastard Son"	We're Only in It for the Money	2:26

Side two
No.	Title	Original album	Length
6.	"It Can't Happen Here"	Freak Out!	3:13
7.	"You're Probably Wondering Why I'm Here"	Freak Out!	3:37
8.	"Who Are the Brain Police?"	Freak Out!	3:22
9.	"Plastic People"	Absolutely Free	3:40
10.	"Hungry Freaks, Daddy"	Freak Out!	3:27
11.	"America Drinks & Goes Home"	Absolutely Free	2:43
Total length:			40:34

== Personnel ==
- Frank Zappa
- Jimmy Carl Black
- Roy Estrada
- Ray Collins
- Elliot Ingber
- Billy Mundi
- Don Preston
- Bunk Gardner
- Jim Fielder
- Ian Underwood
- Euclid James "Motorhead" Sherwood

Art Tripp appears in the album cover but he didn't play on any of the songs (Freak Out!, Absolutely Free and We're Only in it for the Money were recorded before he joined the band).

== Production ==
- Producers: Frank Zappa, Tom Wilson
- Director of engineering: Val Valentin
- Engineer: Ami Hadani, Tom Hidley, Gary Kelgren and Dick Kunc.
- Arranger: Frank Zappa
- Cover design: Cal Schenkel

== Charts ==
Chart (1969)	Peak position
US Billboard 200	151
