= Cruising with Ruben & the Jets =

Studio album by the Mothers of Invention
- Released: December 2, 1968
- Recorded: July 1967 – February 1968
- Studio: Apostolic (New York)
- Genre: Doo-wop
- Length: 40:34
- Label: Bizarre/Verve
- Producer: Frank Zappa

Frank Zappa and the Mothers of Invention chronology
Lumpy Gravy (1968)	Cruising with Ruben & the Jets (1968)	Mothermania (1969)

Ruben and the Jets chronology
Cruising with Ruben & the Jets (1968)	For Real! (1973)

Singles from Cruising with Ruben & the Jets
- 1. "Deseri" Released: 1968; 2. "Anyway the Wind Blows" Released: 1968

Cruising with Ruben & the Jets is the fourth album by the Mothers of Invention, and fifth overall by Frank Zappa, released under the alias Ruben and the Jets. Released on December 2, 1968 on Bizarre and Verve Records with distribution by MGM Records, it is a concept album, influenced by 1950s doo-wop and rock and roll. The album's concept deals with a fictitious Chicano doo-wop band called Ruben & the Jets, represented in the cover illustration by Cal Schenkel, which depicts the Mothers of Invention as anthropomorphic dogs. It was conceived as part of a project called No Commercial Potential, which produced three other albums: Lumpy Gravy, We're Only in It for the Money and Uncle Meat.

The album and its singles received some radio success, due to its doo-wop sound. Subsequently, the name Ruben and the Jets continued with a different lineup, led by musician Rubén Guevara Jr., who recorded the albums For Real! (1973) and Con Safos (1974). Zappa produced the former album.

== Background ==
During a previous recording session, engineer Richard Kunc and the Mothers of Invention discussed their high school days and love for doo-wop songs. Ray Collins and some of the other members of the band started singing and performing the songs, and Zappa suggested that they record an album of doo-wop music. Zappa described the album as an homage to the 1950s vocal music that he was "crazy" about. Collins later left the Mothers of Invention, and Zappa began working on a project entitled No Commercial Potential, which included sessions that produced Cruising with Ruben & the Jets, as well as We're Only in It for the Money, a revised version of Lumpy Gravy, and Uncle Meat. After the Mothers of Invention's contract with MGM and Verve Records expired, Zappa and Herb Cohen negotiated to form Bizarre Productions, with Verve releasing three Bizarre releases with distribution by MGM: a new Mothers of Invention album, Cruising with Ruben & the Jets, the compilation Mothermania, and an album by Sandy Hurvitz, Sandy's Album is Here at Last.

Zappa stated, regarding the releases Lumpy Gravy, We're Only in It for the Money, Cruising with Ruben & the Jets and Uncle Meat, "It's all one album. All the material in the albums is organically related and if I had all the master tapes and I could take a razor blade and cut them apart and put it together again in a different order it still would make one piece of music you can listen to. Then I could take that razor blade and cut it apart and reassemble it a different way, and it still would make sense. I could do this twenty ways. The material is definitely related."

== Recording ==
Ray Collins rejoined the Mothers of Invention for the doo-wop recording sessions of No Commercial Potential, as his high falsetto was suited for the recordings. According to Collins, "I brought the style of being raised in Pomona, California, being raised on the Four Aces, the Four Freshmen, Frankie Laine, Frank Sinatra and Jesse Baldwin. The early influences of R&B came into the Southern California area when I was probably in the tenth grade in high school. And I remember Peter Potter's show, and I think I recall the first R&B tune on there was 'Oop-Shoop'. Frank actually had more influences from the 'real blues', you know, like Muddy Waters, those kind of people. But I wasn't into that in my early life. I was more of the pop culture, pop radio things, and it's always been more of a favourite of mine than the early blues stuff - even though I love John Lee Hooker and all those people."

According to Bunk Gardner, "Cruising with Ruben & the Jets was an easy album to record. We were recording it at the same time as Uncle Meat because the songs were easy and very simple and didn't require a lot of time for arrangements and technical overdubbing. It was the beginning of the end for Ray Collins because all the new material Frank was writing was a little too far out and away from Ray's roots - which was Ruben-era material. Motorhead too was in his glory during the recording of this album. He loved Ruben and that was really his kind of music to get nostalgic over - on stage and doing the dance steps and playing that music [...] I really enjoyed playing a solo on Ray's tune 'Anything'. I remember Frank, Ray and Roy standing in the control booth while I recorded my solo. Frank was telling me after the first take to keep it simple. So I nailed it on the second take and everyone was happy!"

The doo-wop recordings were reconstituted as the concept album Cruising with Ruben and the Jets; the album included four rerecordings of songs that were on the Mothers' first album Freak Out!: "How Could I Be Such a Fool"; "You Didn't Try to Call Me"; "Anyway the Wind Blows"; and "I'm Not Satisfied". Their arrangements were altered to fit within the album's concept.

=== Concept ===
Within the concept of the album, Ruben Sano was the leader of the fictitious Chicano band "the Jets". The back cover depicted Ruben with an early high school photograph of Zappa. According to artist Cal Schenkel, "I started working on the story of Ruben and the Jets that is connected with the Uncle Meat story, which is this old guy turns this teenage band into these dog snout people [...] We started that before it actually became Ruben and the Jets. That came out of my love for comics and that style, the anthropomorphic animals, but also it was part of a running story line."

Zappa stated regarding the album's lyrics, "I detest 'love lyrics'." He intentionally wrote lyrics he described as "sub-Mongoloid" to satirize the genre. The music of Cruising with Ruben & the Jets was the most straightforward genre work the Mothers of Invention had performed yet, attempting to faithfully reproduce the sound of 1950s doo-wop and rock and roll. However, the arrangements included quotes from Igor Stravinsky pieces and unusual chord changes and tempos.

== Release and legacy ==
Professional ratings
Review scores
Source	Rating
Allmusic (Cruising with Ruben & the Jets 1984 Remix)	3/5 stars
Allmusic (Greasy Love Songs)	4/5 stars
Rolling Stone	(positive)

The album was popular with radio stations, as they believed it to be an unearthed doo-wop album by an unknown band called Ruben & the Jets. A single was issued ("Deseri" b/w a remixed version of "Jelly Roll Gum Drop") credited to "Ruben and the Jets", with no mention of the Mothers of Invention; according to Zappa, later pressings, which credited the Mothers of Invention, did not receive as much airplay as the original "Ruben" pressings. The album's cover has a word balloon stating "Is this the Mothers of Invention recording under a different name in a last ditch attempt to get their cruddy music on the radio?" Zappa later dismissed claims that he had "fooled people" with this album as "nonsense".

Music critic Simon Reynolds has written numerous times about the album. He originally remarked that Cruising with Ruben & the Jets was one of the earliest forerunners to the '50s rock and roll revival, stating: "He [Zappa] was very on it early. It really becomes – – a lot of glam and glitter music was based around 50s rock and roll imagery. There was a whole lot of songs wistfully looking back to the idea that the early days of rock and roll was innocent and more wild." In his 2011 book Retromania, he cites the record as one of the first postmodern albums. In 2016, while writing for Pitchfork, he stated: "Cruising with Ruben & the Jets is a curiosity in the Zappa discography, not just because it's a whole album based around pastiche, but because it's genuinely and wistfully affectionate towards the caricatured genre in question, doo-wop."

Subsequently, Zappa stated that the Mothers of Invention would record a second doo-wop album under the alias Ruben & the Jets. Later, the band Ruben and the Jets continued with a different lineup, led by musician Rubén Guevara Jr., who recorded the albums For Real! (1973) and Con Safos (1974). Zappa produced the former.

=== Reissues ===
In 2010, the original mix of Cruising with Ruben & the Jets was reissued under the title Greasy Love Songs.

In July of 1983, Zappa recorded new bass and drum parts for the album, using bassist Arthur Barrow and drummer Chad Wackerman, who were members of Zappa's then-current backing band. In a 2007 interview, Wackerman told Andrew Greenaway that in addition to Barrow being involved in the overdubs, "on Ruben & The Jets, Jay Anderson overdubbed acoustic bass after I had done the drum tracks." The new parts were recorded as part of the preparation for a remix of Cruising with Ruben & the Jets that was used for its 1985 compact disc reissue and for the vinyl box set The Old Masters I, also released in 1985. Wackerman and Barrow likewise recorded new drum and bass parts for the CD remix of We're Only in It for the Money. Zappa stated "The master tapes for Ruben and the Jets were in better shape, but since I liked the results on We're Only in it For the Money, I decided to do it on Ruben too. But those are the only two albums on which the original performances were replaced. I thought the important thing was the material itself." Wackerman, Anderson and Barrow were not credited in the liner notes for the CD reissue of Cruising with Ruben & the Jets.

In January, 1985, a $13 million lawsuit was filed against Zappa by Jimmy Carl Black, Bunk Gardner and Don Preston, who were later joined by Ray Collins, Art Tripp and Motorhead Sherwood, increasing the claim to $16.4 million, stating that they had received no royalties from Zappa since 1969. Among the recordings that the former members of the Mothers of Invention were suing over was Cruising with Ruben & the Jets.

In 2010, the original mix of the album was released as part of a compilation titled Greasy Love Songs. Allmusic's François Couture gave the album's 1984 remix 3 out of 5 stars. Another writer for the site, Sean Westergaard, gave Greasy Love Songs 4 out of 5 stars.

== Track listing ==
All tracks are written by Frank Zappa except as noted.

Side one
No.	Title	Writer(s)	Length
1.	"Cheap Thrills"		2:23
2.	"Love of My Life"		3:10
3.	"How Could I Be Such a Fool"		3:35
4.	"Deseri"	Ray Collins, Paul Buff	2:07
5.	"I'm Not Satisfied"		4:03
6.	"Jelly Roll Gum Drop"		2:20
7.	"Anything"	Collins	3:04
Total length:			21:23

Side two
No.	Title	Writer(s)	Length
8.	"Later That Night"		3:06
9.	"You Didn't Try to Call Me"		3:57
10.	"Fountain of Love"	Zappa, Collins	3:01
11.	"No. No. No."		2:29
12.	"Anyway the Wind Blows"		2:58
13.	"Stuff Up the Cracks"		4:35
Total length:			20:37

== Personnel ==
Musicians

- Ray Collins – lead vocals
- Frank Zappa – low grumbles, oo-wah and lead guitar (also drums, piano, bass)
- Roy Estrada – high weazlings, dwaedy-doop and electric bass
- Jimmy Carl Black and/or Arthur Dyre Tripp III – lewd pulsating rhythm
- Ian Underwood or Don Preston – redundant piano triplets
- Motorhead Sherwood – baritone sax & tambourine
- Bunk Gardner & Ian Underwood – tenor and alto saxes

1984 remix

- Jay Anderson – string bass
- Arthur Barrow – electric bass
- Chad Wackerman – drums

Production

- Frank Zappa – producer for Bizarre Productions
- Dick Kunc – engineer
- Cal Schenkel – cover
- Dick Barber and Cal Schenkel – liner photo

== Charts ==
Chart (1969)	Peak position
US Billboard 200	110

== Bibliography ==
- Reynolds, Simon (2011). Retromania: Pop Culture's Addiction to Its Own Past. London: Macmillan + ORM. ISBN 978-1-4299-6858-4.
