= For Real! (Ruben and the Jets album) =

Studio album by Ruben and the Jets
- Released: March 1973
- Genre: Rock and roll; R&B; blues
- Length: 43:41
- Label: Mercury
- Producer: Frank Zappa

Ruben and the Jets chronology
Cruising with Ruben & the Jets (1968)	For Real! (1973)	Con Safos (1974)

Professional ratings
Review scores
Source	Rating
Allmusic	4/5 stars

For Real! is an album by Ruben and the Jets, and the debut of musician Rubén Guevara Jr.'s new lineup, after the group name had previously been used as an alias of The Mothers of Invention in 1968. Released in 1973, For Real! was produced by Frank Zappa, who wrote the first track and played guitar on the second track. The album consists of blues, rhythm and blues and rock and roll music.

== Background ==
During a recording session, engineer Richard Kunc and the Mothers of Invention discussed their high school days and love for doo-wop songs. Ray Collins and some of the other members of the band started singing and performing the songs, and Frank Zappa suggested that they record an album of doo wop music. Collins later left the Mothers of Invention, and Zappa began working on a project entitled No Commercial Potential, which included doo-wop and experimental pop songs which were later reconstituted into a concept album called Cruising with Ruben & the Jets (1968). Zappa described the songs in the doo-wop sessions as an homage to the 1950s vocal music that he was "crazy" about. Collins rejoined the Mothers of Invention for the doo-wop sessions, as his high falsetto was suited for the recordings. Although the recordings generally tried faithfully to reproduce the sound of 1950s doo wop and rock and roll, the arrangements included quotes from Igor Stravinsky pieces and unusual chord changes and tempos. For the album's release, the Mothers of Invention adopted the alias Ruben & the Jets. The album was popular with radio stations, as they believed it to be an unearthed doo wop album by an unknown 1950s band. A single was issued ("Deseri" b/w "Jelly Roll Gum Drop") credited to "Ruben and the Jets", with no mention of the Mothers of Invention. Subsequently, Zappa stated that the Mothers of Invention would record a second Ruben & the Jets album.

Musician Rubén Guevera Jr. met Frank Zappa and heard the Cruising with Ruben & the Jets album at a record listening party at Zappa's Laurel Canyon home, where Zappa suggested that Guevera Jr. continue Ruben and the Jets, and Guevara Jr formed his own lineup. Guevara Jr.'s Ruben and the Jets toured alongside the Mothers of Invention in 1972. Euclid James "Motorhead" Sherwood was the only musician to play with both the Zappa-led and Guevara-led lineups of Ruben and the Jets, after Sherwood joined in 1973. Zappa agreed to produce their debut album, For Real!, which was released in 1973 on Mercury Records, wrote the album's opening song, "If I Could Only Be Your Love Again", and played guitar on the second track, "Dedicated to the One I Love".

== Track listing ==
Side one

1. "If I Could Only Be Your Love Again" – 3:34 (Frank Zappa)
2. "Dedicated to the One I Love" – 5:45 (Lowman Pauling, Ralph Bass)
3. "Show Me the Way to Your Heart" – 5:04 (Tony Duran, Leonard Duran)
4. "Sparkie" – 4:30 (Tony Duran, Ruben Guevara)
5. "Wedding Bells" – 2:58 (Robert "Frog" Camarena)

Side two

1. "Almost Grown" – 2:20 (Chuck Berry)
2. "Charlena" – 5:54 (Manuel Chavez, H. Chaney)
3. "Mah Man Flash" – 2:38 (Ruben Guevara)
4. "Santa Kari" – 4:29 (Ruben Guevara)
5. "Spider Woman" – 3:58 (Paul Hof, Lonnie Scott, Tony Duran, Ruben Guevara)
6. "All Night Long" – 2:22 (John Gray)

== Personnel ==
Personnel adapted from AllMusic.

Ruben and the Jets

- Rubén Guevara Jr. – vocals, tambourine, keyboards
- Tony Duran – guitar, keyboards, vocals
- Robert "Frog" Camarena – rhythm guitar, vocals
- John Martinez – vocals, Hammond organ
- Robert "Buffalo" Roberts – tenor saxophone
- Bill Wild – bass guitar, tenor vocals
- Bob Zamora – drums
- Jim Sherwood – baritone saxophone, tambourine

Additional personnel

- Frank Zappa – producer, guitar on "Dedicated to the One I Love"
