= Ruben and the Jets =

American rock and roll band

- Also known as: The Mothers of Invention (1968)
- Origin: Los Angeles, California, United States
- Genres: Doo-wop; experimental pop; rock and roll; R&B
- Years active: 1968-1974
- Labels: Mercury
- Spinoff of: The Mothers of Invention
- Past members: Rubén Guevara Jr. Tony Duran; Robert "Frog" Camarena; John Martinez; Robert "Buffalo" Roberts; Bill Wild; Bob Zamora; Jim Sherwood; Ray Collins; Frank Zappa; Roy Estrada; Jimmy Carl Black; Arthur Dyer Tripp III; Ian Underwood; Don Preston; Bunk Gardner

Ruben and the Jets was an American rock and roll band from Los Angeles, California. The band originated as an alias for The Mothers of Invention, Frank Zappa's band, to release Cruising with Ruben & the Jets (1968). Later, musician Rubén Guevara Jr. continued the band with his own lineup. Guevara's "Jets" recorded two albums, For Real! (1973) and Con Safos (1974).

== History ==
=== Genesis (1967-68) ===
During a recording session, engineer Richard Kunc and the Mothers of Invention discussed their high school days and love for doo-wop songs. Ray Collins and some of the other members of the band started singing and performing the songs, and Frank Zappa suggested that they record an album of doo-wop music. Collins later left the Mothers of Invention, and Zappa began working on a project entitled No Commercial Potential, which included songs inspired by 1950s vocal groups, which were later reconstituted into a concept album called Cruising with Ruben & the Jets (1968). Zappa described the songs in the doo-wop sessions as an homage to the 1950s vocal music that he was "crazy" about. Collins rejoined the Mothers of Invention for the doo-wop sessions, as his high falsetto was suited for the recordings. For the album's release, the Mothers of Invention adopted the alias Ruben & the Jets, and the album's backstory presented Ruben & the Jets as a 1950s Chicano group. The album was popular with radio stations, as they believed it to be an unearthed doo-wop album by an unknown 1950s band. A single was issued ("Deseri" b/w "Jelly Roll Gum Drop") credited to "Ruben and the Jets", with no mention of the Mothers of Invention; according to Zappa, later pressings, which credited the Mothers of Invention, did not receive as much airplay as the original "Ruben" pressings. Subsequently, Zappa stated that the Mothers of Invention would record a second Ruben & the Jets album.

=== Rubén Guevara Jr.-led lineup (1972-74) ===
Rubén Guevara Jr. grew up in Santa Monica in the 1940s and 1950s. His father, Rubén Guevara Sr., was a member of a Mexican vocal group, Trio Los Porteños, and Guevera Jr. learned how to sing boleros from his father, but later became more interested in the blues and swing music of Louis Prima, and the rock and roll of Ritchie Valens. Guevara Jr. formed a doo-wop group called The Apollo Brothers, but due to creative differences, the group split up. In 1965, Guevera Jr. was booked on ABC's variety show Shindig! as a solo artist, but was asked to adopt a more "Anglo" name, so he performed under the name Jay P. Mobey. According to Guevera Jr.'s son, Rubén Guevara III, Guevera Jr. considered changing his name for this television appearance to be "one of the biggest missteps of his career".

In 1971, Guevera Jr. staged an avant-garde play, Who Are the People?, which fused spoken word, theater, music, and dance to present a criticism of the Vietnam War from a Latino perspective. Later, Guevera Jr. met Frank Zappa and heard the Cruising with Ruben & the Jets album at a record listening party at Zappa's Laurel Canyon home, where Zappa suggested that Guevera Jr. continue Ruben and the Jets, and Guevara Jr. formed his own lineup. Guevara Jr.'s Ruben and the Jets toured alongside the Mothers of Invention in 1972. Euclid James "Motorhead" Sherwood was the only musician to play with both the Zappa-led and Guevara Jr.-led lineups of Ruben and the Jets, after Sherwood joined in 1973.

Zappa took on the duty of producer for the first Ruben and the Jets album with the new lineup, For Real! (1973), released by Mercury Records. Zappa also wrote one of the album's songs, "If I Could Only Be Your Love Again," and played guitar on another track from the album, "Dedicated to the One I Love." During the band's 1973 tour, Ruben and the Jets were booked alongside Three Dog Night and West, Bruce and Laing, and played alongside Tower of Power, Azteca, and Cheech & Chong.

Ruben and the Jets released a second album led by Guevara Jr., Con Safos (1974) [With Respect]. The title of the album was a graffiti tag used by Mexican-American [Chicano] graffiti artists to discourage other graffiti artists from painting over or altering their graffiti, sometimes painted as "c/s". Ruben and the Jets dissolved in the mid-1970s, though some members played another performance later, backed by a future Guevera Jr. band, Con Safos.

== Style and influences ==
As an alias of The Mothers of Invention, Ruben and the Jets played doo-wop and experimental pop songs. Although the Mothers of Invention's "Jets" recordings generally tried faithfully reproduce the sound of 1950s doo-wop and rock and roll, the arrangements included quotes from Igor Stravinsky pieces and unusual chord changes and tempos. Zappa has noted that the album was conceived in the way Stravinsky's compositions were in his neo-classical period: "If he could take the forms and clichés of the classical era and pervert them, why not do the same ... to doo-wop in the fifties?"

The Rubén Guevara Jr.-led lineup of "the Jets" played rock and roll music which incorporated elements of blues, rhythm and blues and progressive rock music and drug humor influenced by Cheech & Chong. Guevara Jr. described Ruben and the Jets' performance style as "Chicano rock theater".

== Legacy ==
After the disillusion of Ruben and the Jets, Guevera Jr. went back to Los Angeles City College, where he studied Chicano Studies. After a transformative visit to Mexico, Guevera Jr. began to produce solo performance art and spoken word poetry which addressed Chicano identity.

The band is referenced during the final scene of Up in Smoke, in which Cheech Marin's character, Pedro De Pacas, says that Alice Bowie, the band that he and Tommy Chong's Anthony "Man" Stoner character led in the film, will be "bigger than Ruben and the Jets." Guevara Jr. appeared in the film as Tom, a trumpet player for the band. Guevara Jr. also appeared in the film Nice Dreams and was credited as the "East L.A. Cultural Attaché" for the film Born in East L.A., for which Guevera Jr. advised East Los Angeles shooting locations, produced some of the film's music and had a cameo in the film as a bar bouncer.

Guevera Jr. founded a record label, Zyanya, which distributed compilations of Latino and Spanish singing bands, and continued to stage experimental plays, including La Quemada and Aztlan and Babylon, Rhythm & Blues (both 1990), which discussed Mexican and Latino history. In 2018, Guevera Jr. released the autobiographical book Confessions of a Radical Chicano Doo-Wop Singer. As of 2021, Guevera Jr. performs with the band The Eastside Lovers. A documentary on Guevera Jr., Con Safos, aired on KCET's Artbound in 2021.

Ruben and the Jets member Tony Duran died on December 19, 2011, from prostate cancer. Sherwood died on December 25, 2011, aged 69. According to a post from his daughter on his Facebook page, Robert "Frog" Camarena died on March 8, 2018, after a long illness following a liver transplant.

== Personnel ==
Personnels adapted from AllMusic.

1968 lineup (alias for The Mothers of Invention)

- Ray Collins – lead vocals
- Frank Zappa – vocals, lead guitar, drums, piano and bass guitar
- Roy Estrada – vocals and bass guitar
- Jimmy Carl Black – drums
- Arthur Dyer Tripp III – drums
- Ian Underwood – piano and saxophone
- Don Preston – piano
- Jim Sherwood – baritone sax and tambourine
- Bunk Gardner – saxophone

Rubén Guevara Jr.-led lineup

- Rubén Guevara Jr. – vocals, tambourine, keyboards
- Tony Duran – guitar, keyboards, vocals
- Robert "Frog" Camarena – rhythm guitar, vocals
- John Martinez - Vocals, Hammond Organ
- Robert "Buffalo" Roberts – tenor saxophone
- Bill Wild – bass guitar, tenor vocals
- Bob Zamora – drums
- Jim Sherwood – baritone saxophone, tambourine

== Discography ==
As an alias for The Mothers of Invention

- Cruising with Ruben & the Jets (1968)

Rubén Guevara Jr.-led lineup

- For Real! (1973)
- Con Safos (1974)
