= Tony Duran =

Tony Duran may refer to:

- Tony Duran (photographer)
- Tony Duran (musician), guitar player associated with the band Ruben and the Jets
