= Greasy Love Songs =

Compilation album by Frank Zappa
- Released: April 4, 2010
- Recorded: April 1963 – February 21, 1969
- Genre: Doo-wop
- Length: 68:26
- Label: Zappa
- Producer: Frank Zappa

Frank Zappa chronology
Philly '76 (2009)	Greasy Love Songs (2010)	Congress Shall Make No Law... (2010)

Professional ratings
Review scores
Source	Rating
AllMusic	4/5 stars

Greasy Love Songs is a compilation album by Frank Zappa, released in 2010. The album consists of the original vinyl mix of Cruising with Ruben & the Jets (1968), with bonus material, including previously unreleased tracks from the original sessions, the single version of "Jelly Roll Gum Drop", and "audio documentary" material. The album is designated as a "Project/Object Audio Documentary". It is project/object #3 in a series of 40th Anniversary FZ Audio Documentaries, following MOFO (2006) and Lumpy Money (2009).

== Track listing ==
All tracks are written by Frank Zappa except as noted.

No.	Title	Writer(s)	Length
1.	"Cheap Thrills"		2:23
2.	"Love of My Life"	Zappa, Ray Collins	3:10
3.	"How Could I Be Such a Fool"		3:35
4.	"Deseri"	Collins, Paul Buff	2:07
5.	"I’m Not Satisfied"		4:03
6.	"Jelly Roll Gum Drop"		2:20
7.	"Anything"	Collins	3:04
8.	"Later That Night"		3:06
9.	"You Didn’t Try to Call Me"		3:57
10.	"Fountain of Love"	Zappa, Collins	3:01
11.	"No. No. No."		2:29
12.	"Anyway the Wind Blows"		2:58
13.	"Stuff Up the Cracks"		4:35
14.	"Jelly Roll Gum Drop" (Alternative Mono Mix)		2:18
15.	"No. No. No." (Long Version)		3:06
16.	"Stuff Up the Cracks" (Mayfair Studios Mix)		6:05
17.	"Serious Fan Mail" (Excerpts from FZ Lecture, The New School, Feb 21, 1969 and WMEX interview, Jan 31, 1969)		5:11
18.	"Valerie" (Unreleased 1967 version)	Clarence Lewis, Bobby Robinson	3:03
19.	"Jelly Roll Gum Drop" (Single Version - B-side of "Deseri")		2:24
20.	"Secret Greasing" (The Story of Ruben & the Jets told by FZ on KPPC, Nov 27, 1968)		3:36
21.	"Love of My Life" ("Cuca Impossible Recordings" 1963 Version)		2:06
