= Uncle Meat =

Studio album with live elements by the Mothers of Invention
- Released: April 21, 1969 (Original LP); October 1987 (CD version)
- Recorded: October 1967 – February 1968 (studio tracks); September 23, 1967 – July 23, 1968, July 14, 1982 (live elements); 1970 and 1982 (film excerpts)
- Venues: Royal Albert Hall, London, England; Whisky a Go Go, Los Angeles, California; Falkoner Theatre, Copenhagen, Denmark; Stadio Communale la Favorita, Palermo, Italy; Miami Pop Festival, Hallandale, Florida
- Studios: Apostolic (New York); Sunset (Los Angeles); UMRK (Los Angeles)
- Length: 74:53 (Original LP); 120:45 (CD version)
- Labels: Bizarre/Reprise (Original LP); Rykodisc (CD version)
- Producer: Frank Zappa

Frank Zappa chronology
Mothermania (1969)	Uncle Meat (1969)	Hot Rats (1969)

The Mothers of Invention chronology
Mothermania (1969)	Uncle Meat (1969)	Burnt Weeny Sandwich (1970)

Uncle Meat is the sixth album by the Mothers of Invention, and seventh overall by Frank Zappa, released as a double album in 1969. Uncle Meat was originally developed as a part of No Commercial Potential, a project which spawned three other albums sharing a conceptual connection: We're Only in It for the Money, Lumpy Gravy and Cruising with Ruben & the Jets.

The album also served as a soundtrack album to the film of the same name, which Zappa eventually finished and released direct-to-video in 1987.

The music is diverse in style, drawing from orchestral, jazz, blues and rock music. The Uncle Meat album was a commercial success upon release, and has been highly acclaimed for its innovative recording and editing techniques, including experiments in manipulation of tape speed and overdubbing, and its diverse sound.

== Background ==
Frank Zappa, who had been interested in film since high school, decided to develop a film vehicle for the Mothers of Invention, titled Uncle Meat. The film would combine elements of science fiction and road stories inspired by the band's sexual escapades. Subsequently, Zappa began working on a project called No Commercial Potential, which eventually became the albums We're Only in It for the Money, Lumpy Gravy, Cruising with Ruben & the Jets and Uncle Meat. Zappa stated, "It's all one album. All the material in the albums is organically related and if I had all the master tapes and I could take a razor blade and cut them apart and put it together again in a different order it still would make one piece of music you can listen to. Then I could take that razor blade and cut it apart and reassemble it a different way, and it still would make sense. I could do this twenty ways. The material is definitely related."

According to artist Cal Schenkel, who worked extensively with Zappa, "I started working on the story of Ruben and the Jets that is connected with the Uncle Meat story, which is this old guy turns this teenage band into these dog snout people ... We started that before it actually became Ruben and the Jets. That came out of my love for comics and that style, the anthropomorphic animals, but also it was part of a running story line."

== Recording ==
For the recording sessions, Zappa worked at Apostolic Studios in Manhattan employing an unusual and innovative 12-track machine built by Scully. Zappa included a large number of overdubs, playing unconventional instruments through studio effects, and speeding up or slowing down recordings for artistic effect. Zappa wanted to make an album that would challenge the complacency of contemporary music fans, as he felt that his fanbase was "accustomed to accepting everything that was handed to them ... politically, musically, socially – everything. Somebody would just hand it to them and they wouldn't question it. It was my campaign in those days to do things that would shake people out of that complacency, or that ignorance and make them question things."

By the time the album was released, Lowell George had joined the band, and has his name listed in the inside cover despite joining after the album was recorded. George and bassist Roy Estrada would go on to form the band Little Feat in late 1969.

=== Music and lyrics ===
Uncle Meat featured a variety of music styles, including orchestral symphonies, free jazz, blues, doo wop and rock and roll. The album also contains spoken word segments featuring Suzy Creamcheese, and features a stronger focus on percussion instrumentation than previous works by Zappa, as well as emphasizing his strengths as a composer and arranger.

"Nine Types of Industrial Pollution" is melodically formless, rooted in percussion instrumentation, and features a guitar solo that was sped up in post production. "Dog Breath, in the Year of the Plague" is delivered as a rock and roll song, with the same theme being repeated as an instrumental later in the album, performed by keyboards, percussion and acoustic guitar. The rock and roll version features three verses with the first chorus being delivered by opera singer Nelcy Walker, and the second chorus featuring sped up vocals. After the third verse, the song becomes an avant-garde orchestral piece performed by percussion, keyboards and instruments; the album liner notes "The weird middle section of DOG BREATH (after the line "Ready to attack") has forty tracks built into it. Things that sound like trumpets are actually clarinets played through an electric device made by Maestro with a setting labeled Oboe D'Amore and sped up a minor third with a V.S.O. (variable speed oscillator). Other peculiar sounds were make[sic] on a Kalamazoo electric organ. The only equipment at our disposal for the modification of these primary sounds was a pair of Pultec Filters, two [Lang Equalizers], and three Melchor Compressors built into the mixing console. The board itself is exceptionally quiet and efficient (the only thing that allowed us to pile up so many tracks) and is the product of Mr. Lou Lindauer's imagination & workmanship."

In addition to the studio recordings, Uncle Meat featured live recordings made at the Royal Albert Hall, including a recording of Don Preston playing "Louie Louie" on the Albert Hall pipe organ, at the end of which Zappa announces it as having been performed by the "London Philharmonic Orchestra". The doo wop-influenced "Electric Aunt Jemima" refers to Zappa's guitar amplifier, equating it with the advertising character Aunt Jemima. Zappa explained, "I get kind of a laugh out of the fact that other people are going to try to interpret that stuff and come up with some grotesque interpretations of it. It gives me a certain amount of satisfaction."

The album concludes with "King Kong", a piece in 3/8, although the instrumental's prelude, a free jazz improvisation over a rhythm section playing in a 5/8 time signature, occurs much earlier in the album. Six variations of the melody appear as the album's finale, with the first establishing its simple melody, the second being a Fender Rhodes Electric Piano solo by Preston, the third showcasing a saxophone solo by Motorhead Sherwood, and the fourth featuring Bunk Gardner playing a soprano saxophone through various electronic effects that emulate the sound of a contrabassoon doubling his solo lines. Two more variations conclude the piece, which include a live recorded performance featuring a saxophone solo by Ian Underwood and then finally ending with a version with sped up gongs, overblown saxophones and other instruments.

== Release and reception ==
Uncle Meat was released as a double album by Bizarre and Reprise Records, subtitled, "Most of the music from the Mothers' movie of the same name which we haven't got enough money to finish yet." Despite the album's experimental nature, it peaked at No. 43 on the Billboard charts.

=== Critical reception ===
Professional ratings
Review scores
Source	Rating
Allmusic	4.5/5 stars
Encyclopedia of Popular Music	5/5 stars
Louder Sound	4/5 stars
The Great Rock Bible	8/10
MusicHound Rock	5/5 stars
OndaRock	9/10
Sputnikmusic	4.5/5
Rolling Stone Album Guide	5/5 stars

Retrospective reviews of the album are "kind", seeing it as an important album in Zappa's discography. In The New Rolling Stone Album Guide (2004) the album is described as an "inspired monstrosity ... [an] assault of glorious noise". AllMusic writer Steve Huey writes, "despite the absence of a conceptual framework, the unfocused sprawl of Uncle Meat is actually a big part of its appeal. It's exciting to hear one of the most creatively fertile minds in rock pushing restlessly into new territory, even if he isn't always quite sure where he's going."

=== Legacy ===
The Uncle Meat film was finally completed and released on home video in 1987. The Uncle Meat album was reissued as a double CD on Rykodisc that year. This release included a song recorded in 1982, "Tengo na minchia tanta", sung in Sicilian and Italian by Massimo Bassoli, who identifies the song as being translated as "I've Got a Big Bunch of Dick". Also added to the 1987 CD is over 40 minutes of sounds and dialogue from the film. The track listing programs the new tracks at the beginning of the second disc, placing the material between the album's original third and fourth sides. The original 1969 vinyl mix was reissued in 2016 as the first disc of Meat Light: The Uncle Meat Project/Object Audio Documentary.

== Track listing ==
=== Original LP ===
All tracks are written by Frank Zappa, except where noted.

Side one
No.	Title	Writer(s)	Length
1.	"Uncle Meat: Main Title Theme"		1:54
2.	"The Voice of Cheese"		0:27
3.	"Nine Types of Industrial Pollution" (listed as "400 Days of the Year" on the label of the original vinyl release)		5:56
4.	"Zolar Czakl"		0:57
5.	"Dog Breath, in the Year of the Plague"		5:51
6.	"The Legend of the Golden Arches"		1:24
7.	"Louie Louie" (At the Royal Albert Hall in London)	Richard Berry	2:28
8.	"The Dog Breath Variations"		1:36
Total length:			20:33

Side two
No.	Title	Writer(s)	Length
1.	"Sleeping in a Jar"		0:49
2.	"Our Bizarre Relationship"		1:05
3.	"The Uncle Meat Variations"		4:40
4.	"Electric Aunt Jemima"		1:53
5.	"Prelude to King Kong"		3:24
6.	"God Bless America" (Live at the Whisky a Go Go)	Irving Berlin	1:22
7.	"A Pound for a Brown on the Bus"		1:29
8.	"Ian Underwood Whips It Out" (Live on stage in Copenhagen)		5:08
Total length:			19:50

Side three
No.	Title	Length
1.	"Mr. Green Genes"	3:10
2.	"We Can Shoot You"	1:48
3.	"'If We'd All Been Living in California...'"	1:29
4.	"The Air"	2:57
5.	"Project X"	4:47
6.	"Cruising for Burgers"	2:19
Total length:		16:30

Side four
No.	Title	Length
1.	"King Kong Itself (As Played by the Mothers in a Studio)"	0:53
2.	"King Kong (Its Magnificence as Interpreted by Dom DeWild)"	1:15
3.	"King Kong (As Motorhead Explains It)"	1:44
4.	"King Kong (The Gardner Varieties)"	6:17
5.	"King Kong (As Played by 3 Deranged Good Humor Trucks)"	0:29
6.	"King Kong (Live on a Flat Bed Diesel in the Middle of a Race Track at a Miami Pop Festival...The Underwood Ramifications)"	7:22
Total length:		18:00

=== CD version ===
Disc one
No.	Title	Writer(s)	Length
1.	"Uncle Meat: Main Title Theme"		1:55
2.	"The Voice of Cheese"		0:26
3.	"Nine Types of Industrial Pollution"		6:00
4.	"Zolar Czakl"		0:54
5.	"Dog Breath, in the Year of the Plague"		3:58
6.	"The Legend of the Golden Arches"		3:27
7.	"Louie Louie (At the Royal Albert Hall in London)"	Richard Berry	2:19
8.	"The Dog Breath Variations"		1:48
9.	"Sleeping in a Jar"		0:50
10.	"Our Bizarre Relationship"		1:05
11.	"The Uncle Meat Variations"		4:45
12.	"Electric Aunt Jemima"		1:46
13.	"Prelude to King Kong"		3:38
14.	"God Bless America (Live at the Whisky a Go Go)"	Irving Berlin	1:10
15.	"A Pound for a Brown on the Bus"		1:29
16.	"Ian Underwood Whips It Out (Live on stage in Copenhagen)"		5:05
17.	"Mr. Green Genes" (remixed)		3:14
18.	"We Can Shoot You"		2:03
19.	"'If We'd All Been Living in California...'"		1:13
20.	"The Air"		2:56
21.	"Project X"		4:48
22.	"Cruising for Burgers"		2:17
Total length:			57:21

Disc two
No.	Title	Writer(s)	Length
1.	"Uncle Meat Film Excerpt Part I"		37:34
2.	"Tengo na minchia tanta"	Bassoli/Zappa	3:46
3.	"Uncle Meat Film Excerpt Part II"		3:51
4.	"King Kong Itself (as played by the Mothers in a studio)"		0:49
5.	"King Kong II (its magnificence as interpreted by Dom DeWild)"		1:21
6.	"King Kong III (as Motorhead explains it)"		1:44
7.	"King Kong IV (the Gardner Varieties)"		6:17
8.	"King Kong V (as played by 3 deranged Good Humor Trucks)"		0:34
9.	"King Kong VI (live on a flat bed diesel in the middle of a race track at a Miami Pop Festival...the Underwood ramifications)"		7:23
Total length:			63:24 120:45

== Personnel ==
=== Musicians ===
The Mothers – at the time of this recording were:

- Frank Zappa – guitar, low grade vocals, percussion
- Ray Collins – swell vocals
- Jimmy Carl Black – drums, droll humor, poverty
- Roy Estrada – electric bass, cheeseburgers, Pachuco falsetto
- Don (Dom De Wild) Preston – electric piano, pipe organ, tarot cards, brown rice
- Billy (The Oozer) Mundi – drums on some pieces before he quit to join RHINOCEROS
- Bunk (Sweetpants) Gardner – piccolo, flute, clarinet, bass clarinet, soprano sax, alto sax, tenor sax, bassoon (all of these electric and/or non-electric depending)
- Ian Underwood – electric organ, piano, harpsichord, celeste, flute, clarinet, alto sax, baritone sax, special assistance, copyist, industrial relations & teen appeal
- Artie (With the Green Mustache) Tripp – drums, timpani, vibes, marimba, xylophone, wood blocks, bells, small chimes, cheerful outlook & specific inquiries
- Euclid James (Motorhead/Motorishi) Sherwood – pop star, frenetic tenor sax stylings, tambourine, choreography, obstinance & equipment setter-upper when he's not hustling local groupies

Special thanks to:

- Ruth Komanoff – who plays marimba and vibes with Artie on many of the tracks, and
- Nelcy Walker – the soprano voice with Ray & Roy on "Dog Breath" & "The Uncle Meat Variations".

Uncredited:

- Pamela Zarubica as Suzy Creamcheese
- Buzz Gardner – trumpet and flugel horn (name appears on back cover along with Lowell George).

Only on the CD version, also uncredited:

- Phyllis Altenhaus, Rodney Bingenheimer, Aynsley Dunbar, Francesca Fisher, Lucy Offerall, Meredith Monk, Janet Neville-Ferguson, Linda Ronstadt, Stumuk, Haskell Wexler, Carl Zappa, guys from Alabama – dialogue on the film excerpts
- Frank Zappa – Synclavier on "Uncle Meat Film Excerpt Part I"
- Massimo Bassoli – vocals on "Tengo na minchia tanta"
- Tommy Mars – keyboards on "Tengo na minchia tanta"
- Scott Thunes – bass on "Tengo na minchia tanta"
- Chad Wackerman – drums on "Tengo na minchia tanta"

=== Production ===
- Frank Zappa – producer
- Cal Schenkel – package design
- Herb Cohen – business production
- Lou Lindauer – equipment
- Richard Kunc – engineer
- Jerry Hansen – engineer
- Mike – tapes

== Charts ==
Chart (1969)	Peak position
US Billboard 200	43
