= Jim Sherwood =

American rock saxophonist and vocalist (1942-2011)

Jim "Motorhead" Sherwood
- Born: Euclid James Sherwood; May 8, 1942; Arkansas City, Kansas, United States
- Origin: Los Angeles, California, United States
- Died: December 25, 2011 (aged 69)
- Genres: Experimental rock; art rock; jazz fusion; doo-wop
- Instruments: Baritone saxophone; soprano saxophone; tenor saxophone; tambourine; vocals; guitar
- Years active: 1957–2011
- Labels: Verve; Bizarre; Rykodisc; Barking Pumpkin

Euclid James "Motorhead" Sherwood (May 8, 1942 – December 25, 2011) was an American rock musician notable for being a member of the original version of Frank Zappa's band the Mothers of Invention, providing soprano, tenor and baritone saxophone, tambourine, vocals and vocal sound effects. He appeared on all the albums of the original Mothers line-up and the 'posthumous' releases Burnt Weeny Sandwich and Weasels Ripped My Flesh, as well as certain subsequent Zappa albums. He also appeared in the films 200 Motels, Video from Hell and Uncle Meat.

== Biography ==
Sherwood was born in Arkansas City, Kansas. He and Zappa met in high school in 1956. Sherwood was in a class with Zappa's brother Bobby, who introduced the two after learning that Sherwood was a collector of blues records. Sherwood sat in with Zappa's first band, R&B group The Black-Outs, at various performances, where he was often a highlight.

Sherwood and Zappa subsequently played together in the Ontario, California rock'n'roll/R&B group The Omens. Sherwood also played with the Blackouts in 1957-1962 and The Village Inn Band in 1965. After Zappa's first marriage began to break up in 1964, he bought local producer Paul Buff's Pal Recording Studio, renaming it "Studio Z", and he and Sherwood lived in the studio for a time. Sherwood first joined The Mothers of Invention as a roadie and equipment manager, also contributing sound effects (using both his voice and saxophone) to their first album, 1966's Freak Out! He became a full member around the time of the group's experimental residence at the Garrick Theater in 1967, of which future bandmate Ruth Underwood, then an audience member, recalls that "there were some nights that you just heard pure music, and other nights, Motorhead'd be talking about fixing his car, with Jim Black's drum beat in the background".

Zappa disbanded the original Mothers line-up in 1969. Sherwood was one of several members that would play for him again in subsequent years, appearing on 1981's You Are What You Is, the Läther box set, and the last album Zappa completed before his death, Civilization Phaze III. In 1971, Sherwood appeared in the movie 200 Motels, starring as Larry Fanoga. In 1973, Sherwood played on For Real!, the first album of Los Angeles doo-wop group Ruben and the Jets, who Zappa had granted permission to use the name of his fictional group, also producing the record and contributing arrangements and the song "If I Could Only Be Your Love Again". Allmusic's Bruce Eder notes the record's "beautifully crafted breaks on sax" by Sherwood and Robert "Buffalo" Roberts. Ruben and the Jets toured in support of Zappa on the West Coast in 1972 and produced one other album, but split after lead singer Rubén Guevara was offered a solo recording contract in the mid-1970s. There were also financial difficulties, Sherwood noting that the group played "too many benefits and not enough paying gigs." Between 1975 and 1979 not much is known of Sherwood. Zappa said he'd “got into scientology for a while, but then he recovered." He returned to the music industry in 1980 reuniting with former members of the Mothers of Invention to form the Grandmothers. He also worked as a plumber during this time.

The nickname "Motorhead" was coined by fellow Mothers member Ray Collins, who observed that Sherwood always seemed to be working on repairing cars, trucks or motorcycles, and joked that "it sounds like you've got a little motor in your head". Sherwood was also occasionally credited as his alter ego "Larry Fanoga".

In later years, Sherwood contributed to various projects alongside his fellow Mothers alumni, including records by The Grandmothers, Mothers keyboardist Don Preston, Ant-Bee and Sandro Oliva.

== Death ==
Sherwood died December 25, 2011. He is reported to have been suffering from an inoperable brain tumor and to have died in his sleep with no pain.

== Discography ==
=== With the Mothers of Invention ===
- Freak Out! (Verve, 1966) (guest musician)
- We're Only in It for the Money (Verve, 1968)
- Cruising with Ruben & the Jets (Verve, 1968)
- Uncle Meat (Bizarre, 1969)
- Burnt Weeny Sandwich (Bizarre, 1970)
- Weasels Ripped My Flesh (Bizarre, 1970)
- Ahead of Their Time (Rykodisc, 1993)

=== With Frank Zappa ===
- Lumpy Gravy (Verve, 1967)
- You Are What You Is (Barking Pumpkin, 1981)
- You Can't Do That on Stage Anymore (sampler) (Rykodisc, 1988)
- You Can't Do That on Stage Anymore, Vol. 1 (Rykodisc, 1988)
- You Can't Do That on Stage Anymore, Vol. 4 (Rykodisc, 1991)
- You Can't Do That on Stage Anymore, Vol. 5 (Rykodisc, 1992)
- Civilization Phaze III (Barking Pumpkin, 1994)
- Läther (Rykodisc, 1996)
- Mystery Disc (Rykodisc, 1998)
- The MOFO Project/Object (Zappa, 2006)

=== With Ruben and the Jets ===
- For Real! (Mercury, 1973)
- Con Safos (Mercury, 1974)

=== With The Grandmothers ===
- Grandmothers (Line, 1980)
- Fan Club Talk (Panda, 1981)
- Lookin' Up Granny's Dress (Rhino, 1982)
- A Mother of an Anthology (One Way, 1993)

=== With Ant-Bee ===
- Snorks & Wheezes (K7, 1993)
- The @x!#*% of.... (K7, 1993)
- With My Favorite "Vegetables" & Other Bizarre Muzik (Divine, 1994)
- Lunar Muzik (Divine Records, 1997)
- Electronic Church Muzik (Barking Moondog, 2011)

=== With Don Preston ===
- Vile Foamy Ectoplasm (Muffin, 1993)

=== With Sandro Oliva ===
- Who the Fuck Is Sandro Oliva?!? (Muffin, 1995)

== Filmography ==
- 200 Motels (1971)
- Video from Hell (1985)
- Uncle Meat (1987)
- The True Story of Frank Zappa's 200 Motels (1989)
