= Tony Duran (musician) =

American singer

- Born: Anthony Phillip Duran; 14 October 1945; Los Angeles, California, USA
- Died: 19 December 2011 (aged 66) Bruceville, Texas, USA
- Occupation: Musician
- Instruments: Guitar, piano, vocals
- Formerly of: Frank Zappa, Ruben and the Jets

Anthony Phillip "Tony" Duran (14 October 1945, Los Angeles, California, US − 19 December 2011, Bruceville, Texas, US) was an American slide guitarist and singer. From 1972 he was member of Frank Zappa's backing band and he was also member of Ruben and the Jets. In 1963 he graduated in Garfield High School.

Tony Duran died on December 19, 2011, at his home in Bruceville, Texas, after a two year battle with prostate cancer.

== Discography ==
This section isn't complete.

=== With Frank Zappa ===
- Waka/Jawaka (1972)
- The Grand Wazoo (1972)
- Apostrophe (') (1974)
- Joe's Domage (2004)
- Imaginary Diseases (2006) − live album
- Zappa Wazoo (2007) − live album
- One Shot Deal (2008) − live album
- Little Dots (2016) - live album

=== With Ruben and the Jets ===
- For Real! (1973)
- Con Safos (1974)
