= The MOFO Project/Object =

Compilation album by Frank Zappa
- Released: December 5, 2006 (2-CD version); December 12, 2006 (4-CD limited edition)
- Recorded: March 9–12, 1966
- Genre: Experimental rock; avant-garde; progressive rock; rock and roll
- Length: 243:56 (4-CD version) ZR 20004; 115:51 (2-CD version) ZR 20005
- Label: Zappa
- Producer: Gail Zappa; Joe Travers

Frank Zappa chronology
Imaginary Diseases (2006)	The MOFO Project/Object (2006)	Trance-Fusion (2006)

Professional ratings
Review scores
Source	Rating
Allmusic	4.5/5 stars

The MOFO Project/Object is a Frank Zappa album, released by the Zappa Family Trust in 2006, in commemoration of the 40th anniversary of Zappa's first album, Freak Out! It documents the making of the album, while also featuring previously unreleased material. It was sold as a "uniquely packaged" 4-CD set. It is project/object #1 in a series of 40th Anniversary FZ Audio Documentaries.

A more affordable 2-CD set, subtitled (fazedooh), was also released. CD2 tracks 2, 5, 11, 12, 13, 15 & 16 are unique to this 2-CD-set release, as they do not appear on the 4-CD box set. All the other tracks are available on the 4-CD set.

The first CD of each of those sets includes the original 1966 vinyl mix of Freak Out!, with a shorter kazoo outro on "Who Are The Brain Police?"

== Track listing ==
=== 4-CD version ===
Disc one - Original 1966 Stereo LP Mix of Freak Out!
No.	Title	Length

None of these tracks have previously appeared in any format outside the Vault other than the configuration offered herein.

Disc two
No.	Title	Length
1.	"Hungry Freaks, Daddy - Vocal Overdub Take 1"	3:47
2.	"Any Way the Wind Blows - Vocal Overdub"	2:53
3.	"Go Cry On Somebody Else's Shoulder - Vocal Overdub Take 2"	3:48
4.	"I Ain't Got No Heart - Vocal Overdub Master Take"	2:27
5.	"Motherly Love - Vocal Overdub Master Takes"	3:09
6.	"I'm Not Satisfied - 2nd Vocal Overdub Master, Take 2 (Rough Mix)"	2:38
7.	"You're Probably Wondering Why I'm Here - Vocal Overdub Take 1 (Incomplete)/Take 2 (Incomplete)"	1:58
8.	"You're Probably Wondering Why I'm Here - Basic Tracks"	3:40
9.	"Who Are the Brain Police? - Basic Tracks"	3:42
10.	"How Could I Be Such a Fool? - Basic Tracks"	2:24
11.	"Any Way the Wind Blows - Basic Tracks"	2:48
12.	"Go Cry On Somebody Else's Shoulder - Basic Tracks"	3:43
13.	"I Ain't Got No Heart - Basic Tracks"	2:36
14.	"You Didn't Try to Call Me - Basic Tracks"	3:01
15.	"Trouble Every Day - Basic Tracks"	7:11
16.	"Help, I'm a Rock - FZ Edit"	5:48
17.	"Who Are the Brain Police? (Section B) - Alternate Take"	1:15
18.	"Groupie Bang Bang"	3:51
19.	"Hold On to Your Small Tiny Horsies..."	2:08

Disc three
No.	Title	Length
1.	"Objects"	4:32
2.	"Freak Trim (Kim Outs a Big Idea)"	5:14
3.	"Percussion Insert Session Snoop"	3:18
4.	"Freak Out Drum Track" (w/ Timp. & Lion)	4:04
5.	"Percussion Object 1 & 2 (FZ Edit)"	6:01
6.	"Lion Roar & Drums From Freak Out!"	5:36
7.	"Vito Rocks the Floor (Greek Out!)"	6:09
8.	"Low Budget Rock & Roll Band"	2:14
9.	"Suzy Creamcheese (What's Got Into You?)"	5:47
10.	"Motherly Love (Live)"	3:12
11.	"You Didn't Try to Call Me (Live)"	4:06
12.	"I'm Not Satisfied (Live)"	2:53
13.	"Hungry Freaks, Daddy (Live)"	3:37
14.	"Go Cry On Somebody Else's Shoulder (Live)"	2:32

Disc four
No.	Title	Length
1.	"Wowie Zowie"	3:02
2.	"Who Are the Brain Police? (Section A, C, B)"	4:31
3.	"Hungry Freaks, Daddy"	3:37
4.	"Cream Cheese (Work Part)"	7:57
5.	"Trouble Every Day (Single Edit)"	2:39
6.	"It Can't Happen Here (Mothermania version)"	3:19
7.	"Psychedelic Music"	2:34
8.	"MGM"	1:54
9.	"Dope Fiend Music"	2:06
10.	"How We Made It Sound That Way"	5:08
11.	"Poop Rock"	0:46
12.	"Machinery"	1:00
13.	"Psychedelic Upholstery"	1:44
14.	"Psychedelic Money"	1:20
15.	"Who Are the Brain Police?"	3:39
16.	"Any Way the Wind Blows"	2:58
17.	"Hungry Freaks, Daddy"	3:33
18.	"The 'Original' Group"	1:29
19.	"Necessity"	1:18
20.	"Union Scale"	1:46
21.	"25 Hundred Signing Fee"	1:12
22.	"Tom Wilson"	0:33
23.	"My Pet Theory"	2:18
24.	"There is No Need"	0:43

=== 2-CD version ===
Disc one - Original 1966 Stereo LP Mix of Freak Out!
No.	Title	Length

Disc two
No.	Title	Length
1.	"Trouble Every Day (Basic Tracks)"	7:10
2.	"Who Are the Brain Police?" (mono single mix)	3:26
3.	"I Ain't Got No Heart (Basic Tracks)"	2:36
4.	"You Didn't Try to Call Me (Basic Tracks)"	3:00
5.	"How Could I Be Such a Fool?" (mono single mix)	2:13
6.	"Any Way the Wind Blows - 1987 FZ Remix"	2:51
7.	"Go Cry on Somebody Else's Shoulder (Vocal Overdub Take 2)"	3:46
8.	"Motherly Love (Vocal Overdub Master Takes)"	3:09
9.	""Tom Wilson""	0:33
10.	""My Pet Theory""	2:17
11.	"Hungry Freaks, Daddy (Basic Tracks)"	3:28
12.	"Help, I'm a Rock - 1970 FZ Remix"	4:43
13.	"It Can't Happen Here - 1970 FZ Remix"	3:58
14.	"Freak Out Drum Track" (w/ Timp. & Lion)	4:03
15.	"Watts Riot Demo/Fillmore Sequence"	2:07
16.	"Freak Out Zilofone"	3:00
17.	"Low Budget Rock & Roll Band"	2:42

== Credits ==
• Arthur Maebe
• Benjamin Barrett
• Bob Stone - Remixing
• Carl Franzoni
• Carol Kaye
• Chris Riess - Liner Notes
• Dave Wells
• David Anderle
• David Fricke - Liner Notes
• Doug Sax - Remastering
• Edgard Varèse - Author
• Elliot Ingber - Guitar, Guitar (Rhythm)
• Emmet Sargeant
• Eugene Dinovi
• Frank Zappa - Arranger, Art Direction, Author, Conductor, Executive Producer, Orchestration, Percussion, Producer, Remixing, Text
• Gail Zappa - Producer
• Gene Estes - Percussion
• George Price
• Jack Anesh - Cover Design
• Jim Black - Drums, Percussion, Vocals
• Joe Travers - Producer, Vault Research
• John "Snakehips" Johnson
• John Polito - Audio Restoration, Mastering
• John Rotella
• Joseph Saxon
• Ken Watson - Percussion
• Kim Fowley
• Kurt Reher
• Melanie Starks - Production Coordination
• Mothers Auxiliary
• Neil Levang
• Paul Bergstrom
• Plas Johnson
• Ray Collins - Finger Cymbals, Hair Stylist, Harmonica, Tambourine, Vocals
• Ray Leong - Cover Photo
• Raymond Kelley (cello)
• Roy Caton
• Roy Estrada - Bass, Guitarron, Soprano (Vocal)
• Sangwook "Sunny" Nam - Remastering
• Stan Agol - Remixing
• Terry Gilliam
• Tom Wilson - Producer
• Tracy Veal - Art Direction, Layout Design
• Val Valentine - Engineering Director
• Virgil Evans
