= Con Safos =

Studio album by Ruben and the Jets
- Released: 1974
- Genres: Rock and roll; R&B
- Length: 36:31
- Label: Mercury
- Producer: Denny Randell

Ruben and the Jets chronology
For Real! (1973)	Con Safos (1974)

Professional ratings
Review scores
Source	Rating
Allmusic	3.5/5 stars

Con Safos (With Respect) is an album by Ruben and the Jets. The title of the album is a graffiti tag used by Mexican-American graffiti artists to discourage other graffiti artists from painting over or altering their graffiti, sometimes painted as "c/s".

Released in 1974, the album is the second and final release to feature the lineup led by musician Rubén Guevara Jr. The album's eclectic sound draws from genres such as blues, rhythm and blues, progressive rock and rock and roll.

== Track listing ==
Side one

1. "Cruisin' Down Broadway" - 3:20
2. "To Be Loved" - 3:07
3. "Stronger" (preview) - 0:32
4. "Speedoo" - 3:31 (Esther Navarro)
5. "Honky Tonk" - 3:45
6. "Low Ridin' Cruiser" - 3:27

Side two

1. "Stronger" - 3:35
2. "Earth to Buffalo" - 1:09
3. "I Wanna Know" - 3:08
4. "Honky Tonk" (replay) - 0:49
5. "Dust My Blues" - 2:47 (Robert Johnson, credited to Elmore James)
6. "A Thousand Miles Away/You Send Me" - 3:01
7. "Durango" - 4:16

== Personnel ==
Personnel adapted from AllMusic.

Ruben and the Jets

- Rubén Guevara Jr. – vocals, tambourine, keyboards
- Tony Duran – guitar, keyboards, vocals
- Robert "Frog" Camarena – rhythm guitar, vocals
- Robert "Buffalo" Roberts – tenor saxophone
- Bill Wild – bass guitar, tenor vocals
- Bob Zamora – drums
- Jim Sherwood – baritone saxophone, tambourine
