= The Mothers of Invention =

American rock band

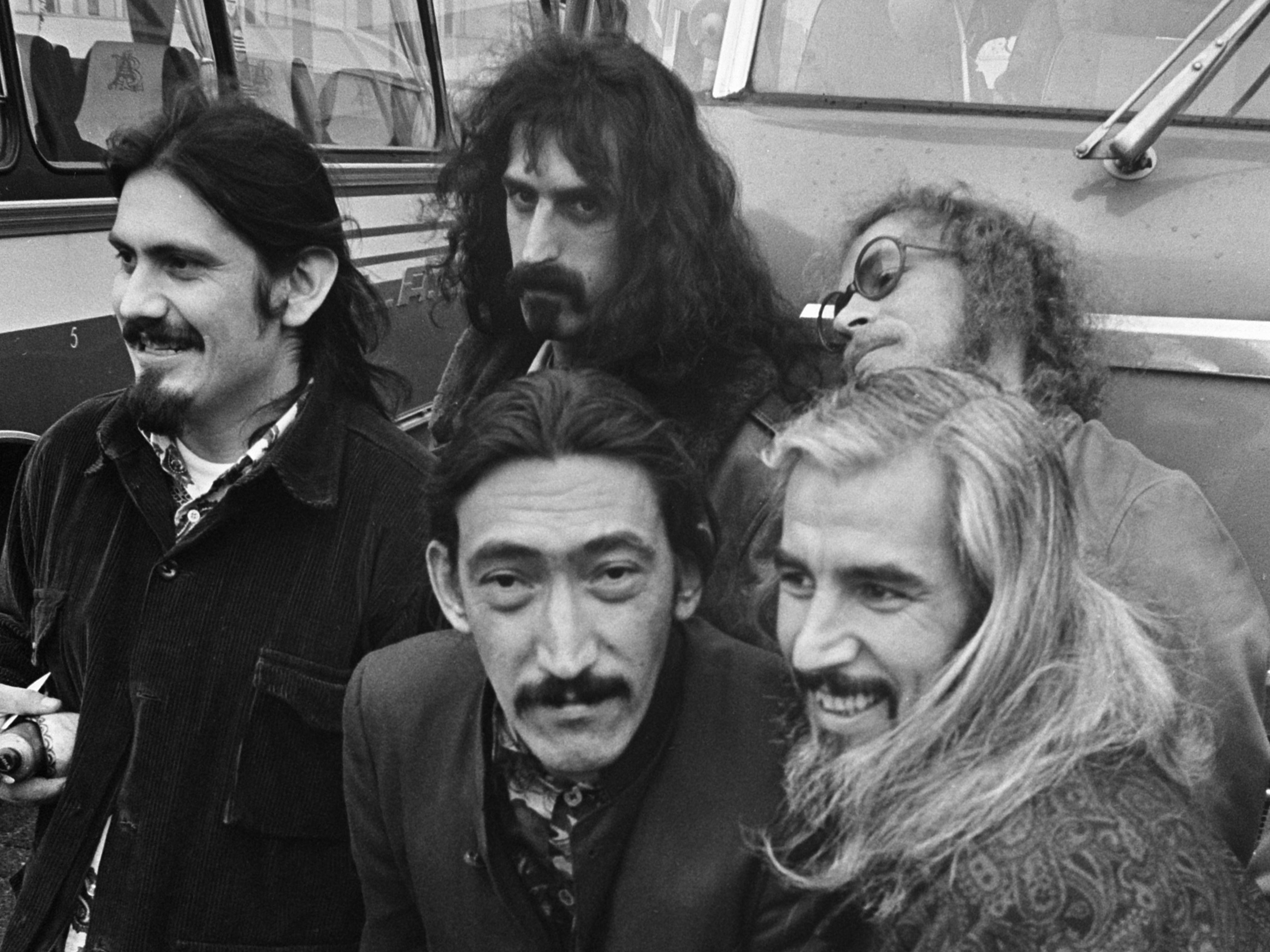
- The Mothers of Invention touring Europe, 1968. Back row: Roy Estrada, Frank Zappa, Don Preston. Front row: Jimmy Carl Black, Bunk Gardner.

Background information
- Also known as: The Soul Giants; The Mothers; Ruben and the Jets (1968); Frank Zappa and the Mothers
- Origin: Pomona, California, U.S.
- Genres: Jazz rock; experimental rock; progressive rock; comedy rock; blues rock; avant-garde; doo-wop; art rock
- Years active: 1965–1969; 1970–1975
- Labels: Verve; Reprise; Bizarre; DiscReet
- Spinoffs: Canned Heat; Little Feat; Ruben and the Jets; Flo & Eddie
- Past members: Frank Zappa; (See other band members)

The Mothers of Invention (also known as the Mothers) was an American rock band from California. Formed on May 9, 1965, their work is marked by the use of sonic experimentation, innovative album art, and elaborate live shows. Originally an R&B band called the Soul Giants, the band's first lineup comprised Ray Collins, David Coronado, Ray Hunt, Roy Estrada, and Jimmy Carl Black. Frank Zappa was asked to take over as the guitarist when a fight between Collins and Hunt led to the latter's being fired. Zappa insisted they perform his original material—a decision that resulted in Coronado's leaving because he did not agree to the change—and on Mother's Day in 1965 the band changed its name to the Mothers. Record executives demanded the name be changed again, and so, "out of necessity", Zappa later said, "We became the Mothers of Invention", referring to the proverb "Necessity is the mother of invention".

After early struggles, the Mothers enjoyed substantial popular commercial success. The band first became popular playing in California's underground music scene in the late 1960s. With Zappa at the helm, it was signed to jazz label Verve Records as part of the label's diversification plans. Verve released the Mothers of Invention's debut double album Freak Out! in 1966, recorded by Zappa, Collins, Black, Estrada and Elliot Ingber. During its original run, the band's ever-changing lineup also included Don Preston, Bunk Gardner, Billy Mundi, Jim Fielder, Ian Underwood, Jim "Motorhead" Sherwood, Art Tripp, Buzz Gardner, and Lowell George. The Mothers released a series of critically acclaimed albums, including Absolutely Free, We're Only in It for the Money, and Uncle Meat, before being disbanded by Zappa in 1969. In 1970, he formed a new version of the Mothers that included Ian Underwood, Jeff Simmons, George Duke, Aynsley Dunbar and singers Mark Volman and Howard Kaylan (formerly of the Turtles, but who for contractual reasons were credited in this band as the Phlorescent Leech & Eddie or Flo & Eddie for short). Later replacing Simmons with another ex-Turtle, bassist Jim Pons, this second incarnation of the Mothers endured through December 1971, when Zappa was seriously injured and almost killed by an audience member during a concert appearance in London.

Zappa focused on big-band and orchestral music while recovering from his injuries, and in 1973 formed the Mothers' final lineup, which included Ian Underwood, George Duke, Ralph Humphrey, Sal Marquez, Bruce Fowler, Tom Fowler, and Ruth Underwood. Napoleon Murphy Brock and Chester Thompson also joined the band later that year. The final non-archival album using the Mothers (of Invention) name, Bongo Fury (1975), featured Captain Beefheart, as well as guitarist Denny Walley and drummer Terry Bozzio, both of whom continued to play for Zappa on subsequent non-Mothers releases.

== History ==
=== Early years (1964–1965) ===
The Soul Giants were formed in 1964. In early 1965, Frank Zappa was approached by Ray Collins who asked him to take over as the guitarist following a fight between Collins and the group's original guitarist. Zappa accepted, and convinced the other members that they should play his music to increase the chances of getting a record contract. Original leader David Coronado did not think that the band would be employable if they played original material, and left the band. Zappa soon assumed leadership and the role as co-lead singer, even though he never considered himself a singer.

The band was renamed the Mothers on May 9, 1965, coincidentally Mother's Day. The group increased their bookings after beginning an association with manager Herb Cohen, while they gradually gained attention on the burgeoning Los Angeles underground music scene. In early 1966, they were spotted by leading record producer Tom Wilson when playing Zappa's "Trouble Every Day", a song about the Watts Riots. Wilson had earned acclaim as the producer for singer-songwriter Bob Dylan and the folk-rock act Simon & Garfunkel, and was notable as one of the few African Americans working as a major label pop music producer at this time.

Wilson signed the Mothers to the Verve Records division of MGM Records, which had built up a strong reputation in the music industry for its releases of modern jazz recordings in the 1940s and 1950s, but was attempting to diversify into pop and rock audiences. Verve insisted that the band officially rename themselves because "Mother" in slang terminology was short for "motherfucker"—a term that apart from its profanity, in a jazz context connoted a very skilled musical instrumentalist. The label suggested the name "The Mothers Auxiliary", which prompted Zappa to come up with the name "The Mothers of Invention".

=== Debut album: Freak Out! (1966) ===
"Hungry Freaks Daddy"
The opening track on Freak Out! The album has "consistently been voted as one of top 100 greatest albums ever made".

A handbill of "Freak Out" concert on September 17, 1966, presented by Dallas producer Pat Morgan at the Shrine Exposition Hall in Los Angeles

With Wilson credited as producer, the Mothers of Invention, augmented by a studio orchestra, recorded the groundbreaking Freak Out! (1966). It mixed R&B, doo-wop, musique concrète, and experimental sound collages that captured the "freak" subculture of Los Angeles at that time. Although he was dissatisfied with the final product—in a late 1960s radio interview (included in the posthumous MOFO Project/Object compilation) Zappa recounted that the side-long closing track "Return of the Son of Monster Magnet" was intended to be the basic track for a much more complex work which Verve did not allow him to complete—Freak Out immediately established Zappa as a "radical new voice" in rock music, providing an antidote to the "relentless consumer culture of America". The record was later regarded as an early example of a rock concept album as it was loosely based around the local Los Angeles freak scene and inspired the Beatles' Sgt. Pepper's Lonely Hearts Club Band. While recording in the studio, some of the additional session musicians were shocked that they were expected to read the notes on sheet music from charts with Zappa conducting them, which was not standard when recording rock music. The lyrics praised non-conformity, disparaged authorities, and had dadaist elements. Yet, there was a place for seemingly conventional love songs. Most compositions are Zappa's, which set a precedent for the rest of his recording career. He had full control over the arrangements and musical decisions and did most overdubs. Wilson provided the industry clout and connections to get the group the financial resources needed.

=== Absolutely Free (1966–1967) ===
Wilson nominally produced the Mothers' second album Absolutely Free (1967), which was recorded in November 1966, and later mixed in New York, although by this time Zappa was in de facto control of most facets of the production. It featured extended playing by the Mothers of Invention and focused on songs that defined Zappa's compositional style of introducing abrupt, rhythmical changes into songs that were built from diverse elements. Examples are "Plastic People" and "Brown Shoes Don't Make It", which contained lyrics critical of the hypocrisy and conformity of American society, but also of the counterculture of the 1960s. As Zappa put it, "[W]e're satirists, and we are out to satirize everything."

=== New York period (1967–1968) ===
The Mothers of Invention played in New York in late 1966 and were offered a contract at the Garrick Theater during Easter 1967. This proved successful and Herb Cohen extended the booking, which eventually lasted half a year. As a result, Zappa and his wife, along with the Mothers of Invention, moved to New York. Their shows became a combination of improvised acts showcasing individual talents of the band as well as tight performances of Zappa's music. Guest performers and audience participation became a regular part of the Garrick Theater shows. One evening, Zappa managed to entice some U.S. Marines from the audience onto the stage, where they proceeded to dismember a big baby doll, having been told by Zappa to pretend that it was a "gook baby".

Situated in New York, and only interrupted by the band's first European tour, the Mothers of Invention recorded the album widely regarded as the peak of the group's late 1960s work, We're Only in It for the Money (released 1968). It was produced by Zappa, with Wilson credited as executive producer. From then on, Zappa produced all albums released by the Mothers of Invention and as a solo artist. We're Only in It for the Money featured some of the most creative audio editing and production yet heard in pop music, and the songs ruthlessly satirized the hippie and flower power phenomena. The cover photo parodied that of the Beatles' Sgt Pepper's Lonely Hearts Club Band, its art provided by Cal Schenkel whom Zappa had met in New York. This initiated a lifelong collaboration in which Schenkel designed covers for numerous Zappa and Mothers albums.

Reflecting Zappa's eclectic approach to music, the next album, Cruising with Ruben & the Jets (1968), was very different. It represented a collection of doo-wop songs; listeners and critics were not sure whether the album was a satire or a tribute. Zappa has noted that the album was conceived in the way Stravinsky's compositions were in his neo-classical period: "If he could take the forms and clichés of the classical era and pervert them, why not do the same ... to doo-wop in the fifties?" A theme from Stravinsky's The Rite of Spring is heard during one song. The album and a single consisting of the songs "Deseri" and "Jelly Roll Gum Drop" were released under the alias Ruben and the Jets.

=== Return to Los Angeles and break up (1968–1969) ===
Zappa and the Mothers of Invention returned to Los Angeles in the summer of 1968. Despite being a success with fans in Europe, the Mothers of Invention were not faring well financially. Their first records were vocally oriented, but Zappa wrote more instrumental jazz and classical oriented music for the band's concerts, which confused audiences. Zappa felt that audiences failed to appreciate his "electrical chamber music". Recorded from September 1967 to September 1968 and released in early 1969, Uncle Meat, the final release by the original Mothers, was a double album of varied music, intended as a soundtrack for a proposed film of the same name.

In November 1968, after Collins had left for the final time, Zappa recruited future Little Feat guitarist Lowell George to replace him.

In 1969, there were nine band members and Zappa was supporting the group himself from his publishing royalties, whether they played or not. 1969 was also the year Zappa, fed up with the label's interference, left MGM Records for Warner Bros.' Reprise subsidiary, where Zappa/Mothers recordings would bear the Bizarre Records imprint.

In late 1969, Zappa broke up the band. He often cited the financial strain as the main reason, but also commented on the band members' lack of sufficient effort. Many band members were bitter about Zappa's decision, and some took it as a sign of Zappa's concern for perfection at the expense of human feeling. Others were irritated by "his autocratic ways", exemplified by Zappa's never staying at the same hotel as the band members. Several members would, however, play for Zappa in years to come. Zappa began recruiting new band members at this time, even asking Micky Dolenz from The Monkees to join. Zappa had appeared on the series and in the movie Head. Remaining recordings with the band from this period were collected on Burnt Weeny Sandwich and Weasels Ripped My Flesh (both released in 1970).

George and Estrada formed Little Feat with Richie Hayward and Bill Payne after the Mothers disbanded.

=== Rebirth of the Mothers and filmmaking (1970) ===
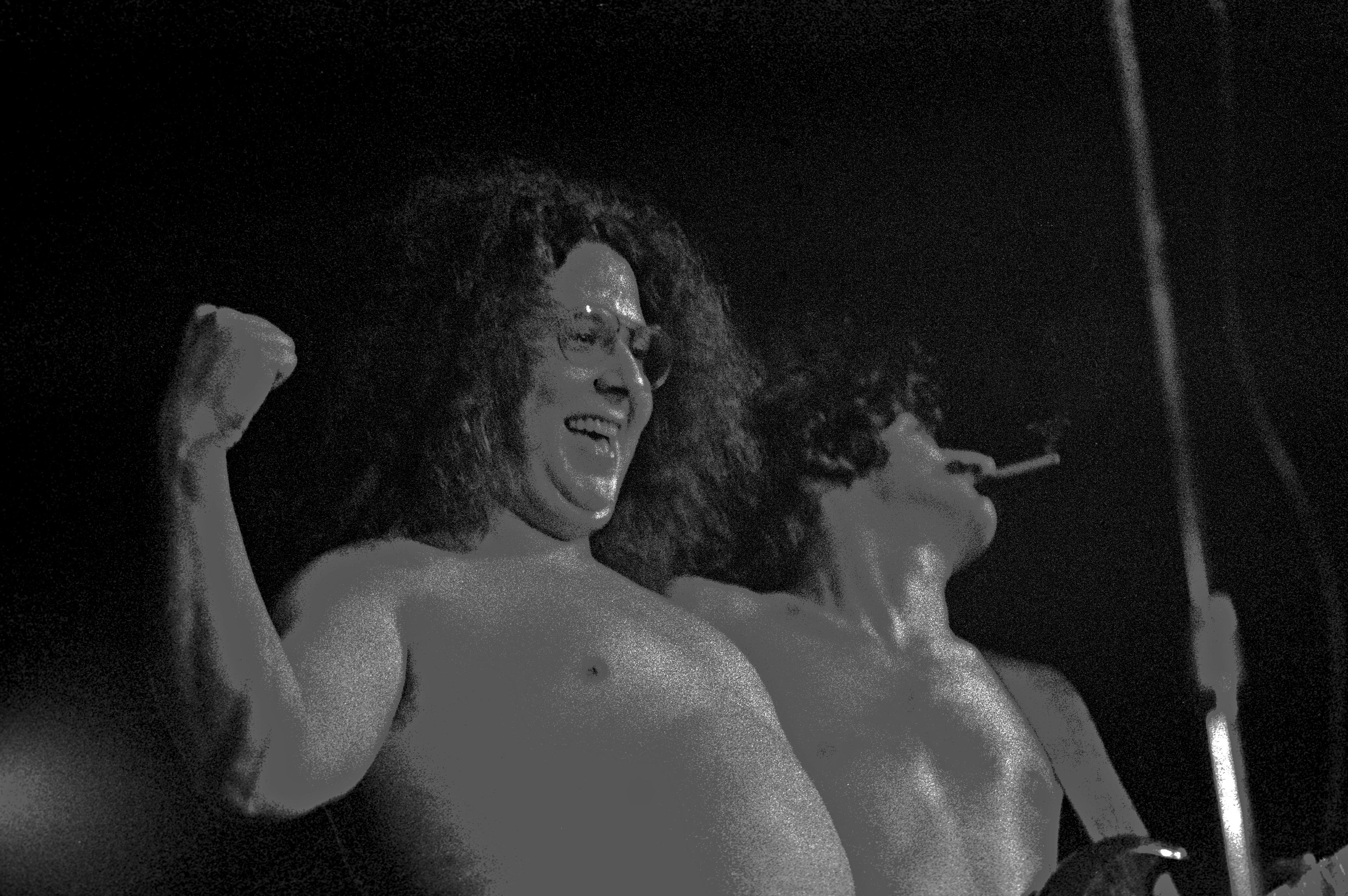
Mark Volman performing with the Mothers in 1971.

Later in 1970, Zappa formed a new version of the Mothers (from then on, he mostly dropped the "of Invention"). It included British drummer Aynsley Dunbar, jazz keyboardist George Duke, Ian Underwood, Jeff Simmons (bass, rhythm guitar), and three members of the Turtles: bass player Jim Pons, and singers Mark Volman and Howard Kaylan, who, due to persistent legal and contractual problems, adopted the stage name "The Phlorescent Leech and Eddie", or "Flo & Eddie".

This version of the Mothers debuted on Zappa's next solo album Chunga's Revenge (1970), which was followed by the double-album soundtrack to the movie 200 Motels (1971), featuring the Mothers, the Royal Philharmonic Orchestra, Ringo Starr, Theodore Bikel, Keith Moon and former members Jimmy Carl Black and Euclid James "Motorhead" Sherwood. Co-directed by Zappa and Tony Palmer, it was filmed in a week at Pinewood Studios outside London. Tensions between Zappa and several cast and crew members arose before and during shooting. The film deals loosely with life on the road as a rock musician. It was the first feature film photographed on videotape and transferred to 35 mm film, a process which allowed for novel visual effects. It was released to mixed reviews. The score relied extensively on orchestral music, and Zappa's dissatisfaction with the classical music world intensified when a concert scheduled at the Royal Albert Hall after filming was canceled because a representative of the venue found some of the lyrics obscene. In 1975, he lost a lawsuit against the Royal Albert Hall for breach of contract.

After 200 Motels, the band went on tour, which resulted in two live albums, Fillmore East – June 1971 and Just Another Band from L.A.; the latter included the 20-minute track "Billy the Mountain", Zappa's satire on rock opera set in Southern California. This track was representative of the band's theatrical performances in which songs were used to build up sketches based on 200 Motels scenes as well as new situations often portraying the band members' sexual encounters on the road.

=== Accident, attack and their aftermath (1971–1972) ===
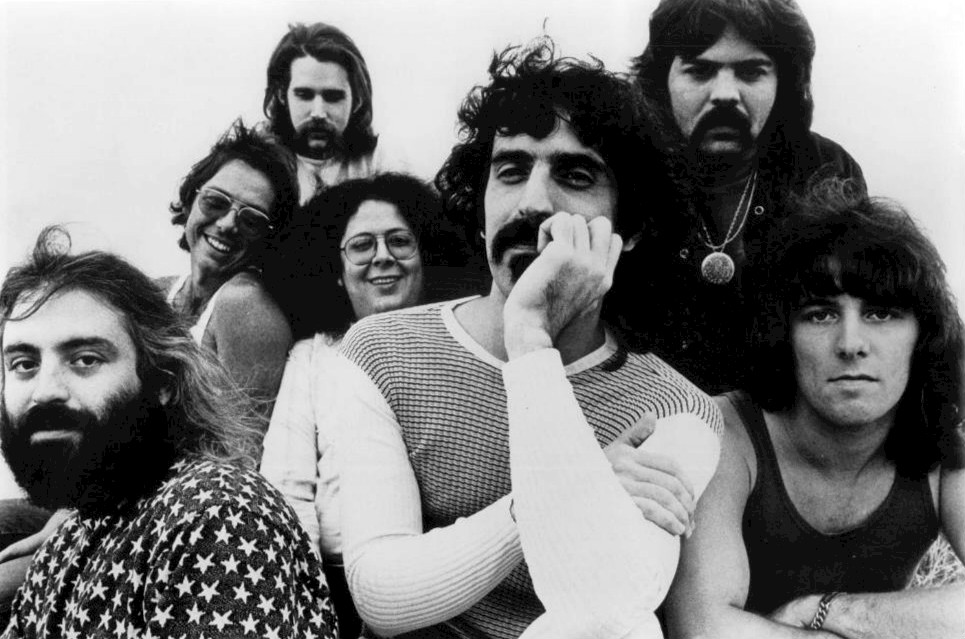
The Mothers of Invention in 1971. Left to right: Howard Kaylan, Jim Pons, Ian Underwood, Mark Volman, Frank Zappa, Bob Harris, Aynsley Dunbar.

In December 1971, there were two serious setbacks. While performing at Casino de Montreux in Switzerland, the Mothers' equipment was destroyed when a flare set off by an audience member started a fire that burned down the casino. Immortalized in Deep Purple's song "Smoke on the Water", the event and immediate aftermath can be heard on the bootleg album Swiss Cheese/Fire!, released legally as part of Zappa's Beat the Boots II compilation. After a week's break, the Mothers played at the Rainbow Theatre, London, with rented gear. During the encore, an audience member pushed Zappa off the stage and into the concrete-floored orchestra pit. The band thought Zappa had been killed—he had suffered serious fractures, head trauma and injuries to his back, leg, and neck, as well as a crushed larynx, which ultimately caused his voice to drop a third after healing. This accident resulted in him using a wheelchair for an extended period, forcing him off the road for over half a year. Upon his return to the stage in September 1972, he was still wearing a leg brace, had a noticeable limp and could not stand for very long while on stage. Zappa noted that one leg healed "shorter than the other" (a reference later found in the lyrics of songs "Zomby Woof" and "Dancin' Fool"), resulting in chronic back pain. Meanwhile, the Mothers were left in limbo and eventually formed the core of Flo and Eddie's band as they set out on their own.

=== Top 10 album (1973–1975) ===
After releasing a solo jazz-oriented album Waka/Jawaka, and following it up with a Mothers album, The Grand Wazoo, with large bands, Zappa formed and toured with smaller groups that variously included Ian Underwood (reeds, keyboards), Ruth Underwood (vibes, marimba), Sal Marquez (trumpet, vocals), Napoleon Murphy Brock (sax, flute and vocals), Bruce Fowler (trombone), Tom Fowler (bass), Chester Thompson (drums), Ralph Humphrey (drums), George Duke (keyboards, vocals), and Jean-Luc Ponty (violin).

Zappa continued a high rate of production through the first half of the 1970s, including the solo album Apostrophe (') (1974), which reached a career-high No. 10 on the Billboard pop album charts helped by the chart single "Don't Eat the Yellow Snow". Other albums from the period are Over-Nite Sensation (1973), which contained several future concert favorites, such as "Dinah-Moe Humm" and "Montana", and the albums Roxy & Elsewhere (1974) and One Size Fits All (1975) which feature ever-changing versions of a band still called the Mothers, and are notable for the tight renditions of highly difficult jazz fusion songs in such pieces as "Inca Roads", "Echidna's Arf (Of You)" and "Be-Bop Tango (Of the Old Jazzmen's Church)". A live recording from 1974, You Can't Do That on Stage Anymore, Vol. 2 (1988), captures "the full spirit and excellence of the 1973–75 band".

Zappa released Bongo Fury in 1975, which featured live recordings from a tour that same year which had reunited him with Captain Beefheart for a brief period. They later became estranged for a period of years, but were in contact at the end of Zappa's life. Bongo Fury was the last new album to be credited to the Mothers.

In 1993, Zappa released Ahead of Their Time, an album of a 1968 live performance by the original Mothers of Invention lineup.

== Personnel ==
Image	Name	Years active	Instruments	Release contributions
	Frank Zappa	April 1965–August 1969; May 1970–December 1971; February 1973–March 1976 (died 1993)	guitars; vocals; percussion	all releases
	Roy Estrada	1964–August 1969; September 1975–March 1976 (died 2025)	bass; guitarrón; vocals	all releases from Freak Out! (1966) to Weasels Ripped My Flesh (1970); Ahead of Their Time (1993, recorded 1968)
	Jimmy Carl Black	1964–August 1969 (died 2008)	drums; percussion; vocals	all releases from Freak Out! (1966) to Weasels Ripped My Flesh (1970); Ahead of Their Time (1993, recorded 1968)
	Ray Collins	1964–July 1967; September 1967–August 1968; May 1970 (died 2012)	lead vocals; percussion; harmonica	Freak Out! (1966); Absolutely Free (1967); Cruising with Ruben & the Jets (1968); Mothermania (1969); Uncle Meat (1969); Weasels Ripped My Flesh (1970)
	David Coronado	1964–May 1965	saxophone	none
	Ray Hunt	1964–April 1965	guitar	none
	Steve Mann	Summer 1965 (died 2009)	guitar	none
	Alice Stuart	Summer 1965 (died 2023)	guitar	none
	Henry Vestine	November 1965–February 1966 (died 1997)	guitar	none
	Jim Guercio	February 1966	guitar	none
	Elliot Ingber	March–September 1966 (died 2025)	guitar	Freak Out! (1966); Mothermania (1969)
	Denny Bruce	August 1966	drums	none
	Billy Mundi	August 1966–February 1968; May 1970 (died 2014)	drums	all releases from Absolutely Free (1967) to Burnt Weeny Sandwich (1970)
	Van Dyke Parks	September 1966	keyboards	none
	Del Kacher	September–October 1966	rhythm guitar	none
	Jim Fielder	October 1966–February 1967	rhythm guitar; piano	Absolutely Free (1967); Mothermania (1969)
	Don Preston	November 1966–August 1969; May 1970; June–December 1971; April–May 1974	keyboards	all releases from Absolutely Free (1967) to Just Another Band from L.A. (1972); Roxy & Elsewhere (1974); Ahead of Their Time (1993, recorded 1968); Carnegie Hall (2011, recorded 1971)
	John Leon "Bunk" Gardner	November 1966–August 1969	flutes; clarinets; saxophones; bassoon	all releases from Absolutely Free (1967) to Weasels Ripped My Flesh (1970); Ahead of Their Time (1993, recorded 1968)
	Sandy Hurvitz	Summer 1967 (exact time unknown) (died 2023)	vocals; keyboards	none
	Ian Underwood	July 1967–August 1969; May 1970–December 1971; February–September 1973	keyboards; flute; clarinets; saxophones; rhythm guitar	all releases from We're Only in It for the Money (1968) to Just Another Band from L.A. (1972); Over-Nite Sensation (1973); Playground Psychotics (1992, recorded 1970–1971); Ahead of Their Time (1993, recorded 1968); Carnegie Hall (2011, recorded 1971); The Mothers 1970 (2020, recorded 1970); The Mothers 1971 (2022, recorded 1971)
	Euclid James "Motorhead" Sherwood	September 1967–August 1969; May 1970 (died 2011)	saxophones; tambourine	all releases from Freak Out! (1966) to Weasels Ripped My Flesh (1970); Ahead of Their Time (1993, recorded 1968)
	Art Tripp	March 1968–August 1969	drums; timpani; vibraphone; marimba; xylophone; wood blocks; bells; small chimes	Cruising with Ruben & the Jets (1968); Uncle Meat (1969); Burnt Weeny Sandwich (1970); Weasels Ripped My Flesh (1970); Ahead of Their Time (1993, recorded 1968)
	Buzz Gardner	November 1968–August 1969 (died 2004)	trumpet; flugelhorn	Uncle Meat (1969); Burnt Weeny Sandwich (1970); Weasels Ripped My Flesh (1970)
	Lowell George	November 1968 – May 1969 (died 1979)	rhythm guitar; vocals	Burnt Weeny Sandwich (1970); Weasels Ripped My Flesh (1970)
	Aynsley Dunbar	May 1970–December 1971	drums	Fillmore East – June 1971 (1971); 200 Motels (1971); Just Another Band from L.A. (1972); The Grand Wazoo (1972); Playground Psychotics (1992, recorded 1970–1971); Carnegie Hall (2011, recorded 1971); The Mothers 1970 (2020, recorded 1970); The Mothers 1971 (2022, recorded 1971)
	Jeff Simmons	May 1970–January 1971; December 1973–July 1974	bass; rhythm guitar; vocals	Roxy & Elsewhere (1974); The Mothers 1970 (2020, recorded 1970)
	Mark Volman ("Flo", "The Phlorescent Leach")	June 1970–December 1971 (died 2025)	vocals	Fillmore East – June 1971 (1971); 200 Motels (1971); Just Another Band from L.A. (1972); Playground Psychotics (1992, recorded 1970–1971); Carnegie Hall (2011, recorded 1971); The Mothers 1970 (2020, recorded 1970); The Mothers 1971 (2022, recorded 1971)
	Howard Kaylan ("Eddie")	June 1970–December 1971	vocals	Fillmore East – June 1971 (1971); 200 Motels (1971); Just Another Band from L.A. (1972); Playground Psychotics (1992, recorded 1970–1971); Carnegie Hall (2011, recorded 1971); The Mothers 1970 (2020, recorded 1970); The Mothers 1971 (2022, recorded 1971)
	George Duke	June 1970–December 1970; February 1973–December 1974; April–May 1975 (died 2013)	keyboards; vocals; trombone	200 Motels (1971); Over-Nite Sensation (1973); Roxy & Elsewhere (1974); One Size Fits All (1975); Bongo Fury (1975); The Mothers 1970 (2020, recorded 1970)
	Martin Lickert	January–February 1971	bass	200 Motels (1971)
	Jim Pons	February–December 1971	bass; vocals	Fillmore East – June 1971 (1971); 200 Motels (1971); Just Another Band from L.A. (1972); Playground Psychotics (1992, recorded 1970–1971); Carnegie Hall (2011, recorded 1971); The Mothers 1971 (2022, recorded 1971)
	Bob Harris	May–August 1971 (died 2001)	keyboards; vocals	Fillmore East – June 1971 (1971); Playground Psychotics (1992, recorded 1970–1971); The Mothers 1971 (2022, recorded 1971)
	Ralph Humphrey	February 1973–May 1974 (died 2023)	drums	Over-Nite Sensation (1973); Roxy & Elsewhere (1974)
	Jean-Luc Ponty	February–August 1973	violin	Over-Nite Sensation (1973)
	Tom Fowler	February 1973–November 1974; December 1974–May 1975; (died 2024)	bass	all releases from Over-Nite Sensation (1973) to Bongo Fury (1975)
	Ruth Underwood	February 1973–December 1975	marimba; vibraphone; percussion	Uncle Meat (1969); 200 Motels (1971); Over-Nite Sensation (1973); Roxy & Elsewhere (1974)
	Bruce Fowler	February 1973–May 1974; April–May 1975	trombone	Over-Nite Sensation (1973); Roxy & Elsewhere (1974); Bongo Fury (1975)
	Sal Marquez	March 1973–July 1973	trumpet; vocals	Over-Nite Sensation (1973)
	Kin Vassy	April–May 1973	vocals	Over-Nite Sensation (1973)
	Napoleon Murphy Brock	October 1973–May 1975	flute; tenor saxophone; vocals	Roxy & Elsewhere (1974); One Size Fits All (1975); Bongo Fury (1975)
	Chester Thompson	October 1973–December 1974	drums	Roxy & Elsewhere (1974); One Size Fits All (1975); Bongo Fury (1975)
	James Youmans	November–December 1974	bass	none
	Terry Bozzio	April 1975–March 1976	drums	Bongo Fury (1975)
	Denny Walley	April 1975–March 1976	slide guitar; backing vocals	Bongo Fury (1975)
	Captain Beefheart	April–May 1975 (died 2010)	vocals	Bongo Fury (1975)
	Andre Lewis	September 1975–March 1976 (died 2012)	keyboards; vocals	none
	Novi Novog	September–October 1975	viola	none
	Robert "Frog" Camarena	September–October 1975	vocals	Roxy & Elsewhere (1974); Bongo Fury (1975)
	Norma Jean Bell	November–December 1975	saxophone; vocals	none
	Darryl Dybka	December 1975	keyboards	none

== Discography ==
- Freak Out! (1966)
- Absolutely Free (1967)
- We're Only in It for the Money (1968)
- Cruising with Ruben & the Jets (1968)
- Mothermania (1969, compilation)
- Uncle Meat (1969)
- The **** of the Mothers (1969, compilation)
- Burnt Weeny Sandwich (1970)
- Weasels Ripped My Flesh (1970)
- Fillmore East – June 1971 (1971, live)
- 200 Motels (1971)
- Just Another Band from L.A. (1972, live)
- The Grand Wazoo (1972)
- Over-Nite Sensation (1973)
- Roxy & Elsewhere (1974, live)
- One Size Fits All (1975)
- Bongo Fury (1975, live)
- Playground Psychotics (1992, recorded 1970–71)
- Ahead of Their Time (1993, recorded 1968)
- Carnegie Hall (2011, recorded 1971)
- The Mothers 1970 (2020, recorded 1970)
- The Mothers 1971 (2022, recorded 1971)
- Whisky a Go Go 1968 (2024, recorded 1968)

== Sources ==
- Bashe, Patricia Romanowski; George-Warren, Holly; Pareles, Jon (1995). The New Rolling Stone Encyclopedia of Rock & Roll (2nd ed.). New York: Fireside/Simon & Schuster. ISBN 9780684810447. OCLC 987950913.
- Lowe, Kelly (2006). The words and music of Frank Zappa. Westport, Conn: Praeger. ISBN 9780313054570. OCLC 231671209.
- Miles, Barry (2004). Zappa. New York: Grove Press. ISBN 9780802142153. OCLC 852013692.
- Slaven, Neil (2009). Electric Don Quixote. London: Music Sales. ISBN 9780857120434. OCLC 1028956730.
- Starks, Michael (1982). Cocaine Fiends and Reefer Madness : An Illustrated History of Drugs in the Movies. New York: Cornwall Books. ISBN 9780845345047. OCLC 7247337.
- Walley, David (1980). No commercial potential : the saga of Frank Zappa, then and now. New York: E.P. Dutton. ISBN 9780525931539. OCLC 7067436.
- Watson, Ben (1995). Frank Zappa : The Negative Dialectics of Poodle Play. New York: St. Martin's Press. ISBN 9780312119188. OCLC 1035086199.
- Watson, Ben (2005). Frank Zappa : the complete guide to his music. London: Omnibus. ISBN 9780857127389. OCLC 934706705.
- Zappa, Frank; Occhiogrosso, Peter (1989). The real Frank Zappa book. New York: Poseidon Press. ISBN 9780671638702. OCLC 910366907.
