= Billy Mundi =

American drummer (1942–2014)

Billy Mundi (born Antonio Salas; September 25, 1942 in San Francisco–March 29, 2014) was an American drummer best known as a member of the original version of Frank Zappa's band The Mothers of Invention, as well as the band Rhinoceros. He also worked as a session musician. He sometimes used the name Tony Schnasse.

A former Hells Angel, his career dates back to the late 1950s, when he majored in music at UCLA. After graduation, Mundi worked for three months as a timpanist in the Los Angeles Philharmonic before moving into studio work and a succession of local bands. In the early 1960s, he played in Skip Battin's group, Skip and The Flips, and worked as a session musician on Tim Buckley's debut album among others. Mundi was briefly a member of The Lamp of Childhood in mid-1966.

In 1966, he joined The Mothers of Invention during the recording of the album Freak Out!, and later provided drums for several subsequent Mothers albums. He also featured in the movie Uncle Meat. He was enticed away from the Mothers by Jac Holzman at Elektra Records to form a supergroup, Rhinoceros. According to Frank Zappa, Holzman "offered Billy Mundi a huge amount of money, a place to live, the whole package — we'll make you a star, you'll work with these top-grade musicians instead of those comedy guys... But I don't blame Billy for taking the job, because at that time we were so poor he was living in the Albert Hotel and he couldn't get enough to eat — he used to come in and tell us how he'd quell his appetite by drinking the hot water in the shower...".

Around 1970, Mundi moved to Woodstock, New York, where he worked with Geoff Muldaur and Maria Muldaur and as a session musician. He lived in California with his wife of 31 years, Patty.

Billy died on March 29, 2014, due to complications from diabetes.
