= Ray Collins (musician) =

American singer (1936–2012)

- Born: November 19, 1936; Pomona, California, U.S.
- Died: December 24, 2012 (aged 76) Claremont, California, U.S.
- Genres: Rock; rock and roll; doo-wop; experimental rock
- Occupation: Musician
- Instruments: Vocals; harmonica; tambourine
- Years active: 1957–1970
- Formerly of: Frank Zappa; Mothers of Invention

Ray Collins (November 19, 1936 – December 24, 2012) was an American musician. He is best known for being an original member of the Mothers of Invention and the primary lead vocalist on their earliest albums.

== Early life ==
Collins grew up in Pomona, California singing in his school choir, the son of a local police officer. He dropped out of high school just before graduation to marry his girlfriend, who became pregnant.

== Career ==
Collins started his musical career singing falsetto backup vocals for various doo-wop groups in the Los Angeles area in the late 1950s and early 1960s, including Little Julian Herrera and the Tigers. In 1963 Collins co-wrote "Memories of El Monte" with Frank Zappa. In 1964, Collins formed the Soul Giants with drummer Jimmy Carl Black, bassist Roy Estrada, saxophonist Dave Coronado, and guitarist Ray Hunt.

Hunt was eventually replaced by Zappa, and the group evolved into the Mothers of Invention. Ray was the lead vocalist on most songs for their early albums, including Freak Out!, Absolutely Free, Cruising with Ruben & the Jets and Uncle Meat. He additionally provided harmonica on Freak Out!. In 1968 Ray quit The Mothers of Invention because of tension in the group, citing that the band was "too much comedy and making fun of stuff" and was replaced by Lowell George, but continued to contribute to other Zappa projects through the mid-1970s. Collins later said in 2009 that he "wanted to make beautiful music. I was raised on Johnny Mathis and Nat King Cole."

Collins's performances appeared on a few archival and live recordings released after he dropped out of music.

== Personal life ==
Collins got married in 1953. He had a daughter who died in a plane crash at a young age.

After quitting the Mothers of Invention and leaving behind his music career, Collins worked as a taxi driver for a few years, and later worked as a dishwasher in Hawaii. He moved to Claremont, California in 1991, where he remained until his death. He moved into a small Airstream trailer in local potter Peter Scott’s back yard in Claremont, until Scott sold the property and Ray began living in a van that he purchased. His only income reportedly came from songwriting royalties and Social Security.

== Death ==
Collins suffered a heart attack in the van while it was parked in front of the Claremont Post Office and was not found for several hours. After being hospitalized in Pomona and never regaining consciousness, he died on December 24, 2012, aged 76.

== Discography ==
With Little Julian Herrera And The Tigers

- "I Remember Linda" / "True Fine Mama" (1957, 7", Starla Records, USA) - feat. Ray Collins on high falsetto backing

With Frank Zappa and The Mothers of Invention

- Freak Out! (1966)
- Absolutely Free (1967)
- Cruising with Ruben & the Jets (1968)
- Uncle Meat (1969)
- Burnt Weeny Sandwich (1970)
- Weasels Ripped My Flesh (1970)
- Apostrophe (')
- 'Tis The Season To Be Jelly
- You Can't Do That on Stage Anymore, Vol. 5
- The Lost Episodes
- Mystery Disc
- Joe's Corsage
