= Roy Estrada =

American musician (1943–2025)

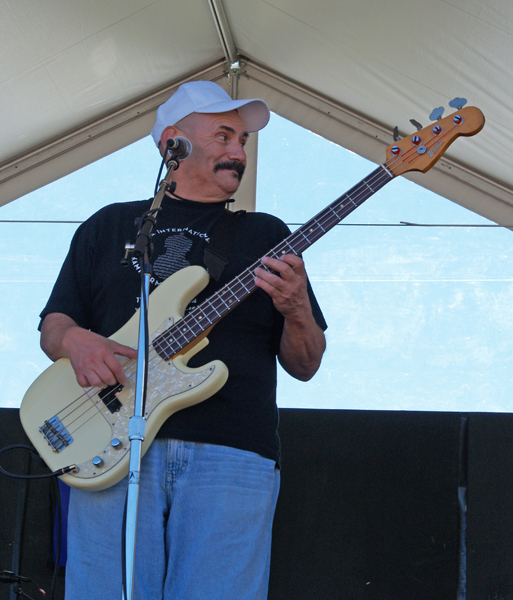
- Estrada performing in 2006

Background information
- Also known as: Roy Ralph Moleman Guacamole Guadalupe Hidalgo Estrada and Orejón
- Born: April 17, 1943; Santa Ana, California, U.S.
- Died: August 14, 2025 (aged 82) Conroe, Texas, U.S.
- Genres: Rock; boogie rock; roots rock; avant-garde; experimental rock; jazz fusion; Southern rock
- Occupation: Musician
- Instruments: Bass guitar; vocals; guitarrón
- Years active: 1964–1994; 2000–2012
- Formerly of: The Mothers of Invention; Little Feat; Captain Beefheart; The Magic Band

Roy Ralph Estrada (April 17, 1943 – August 14, 2025) was an American musician, also known as Roy Ralph Moleman Guacamole Guadalupe Hidalgo Estrada and Orejón. He is best known for being the original bassist of both the Mothers of Invention and Little Feat. He was also later a member of Captain Beefheart's the Magic Band and occasionally still worked with Frank Zappa in Zappa's solo career following the Mothers' split.

Estrada was incarcerated in the Texas State Prison System. He was convicted for sex offenses on at least three occasions between 1977 and 2012. He would not have been eligible for release until 2037, at which time he would have been between 93 and 94 years old.

== Career ==
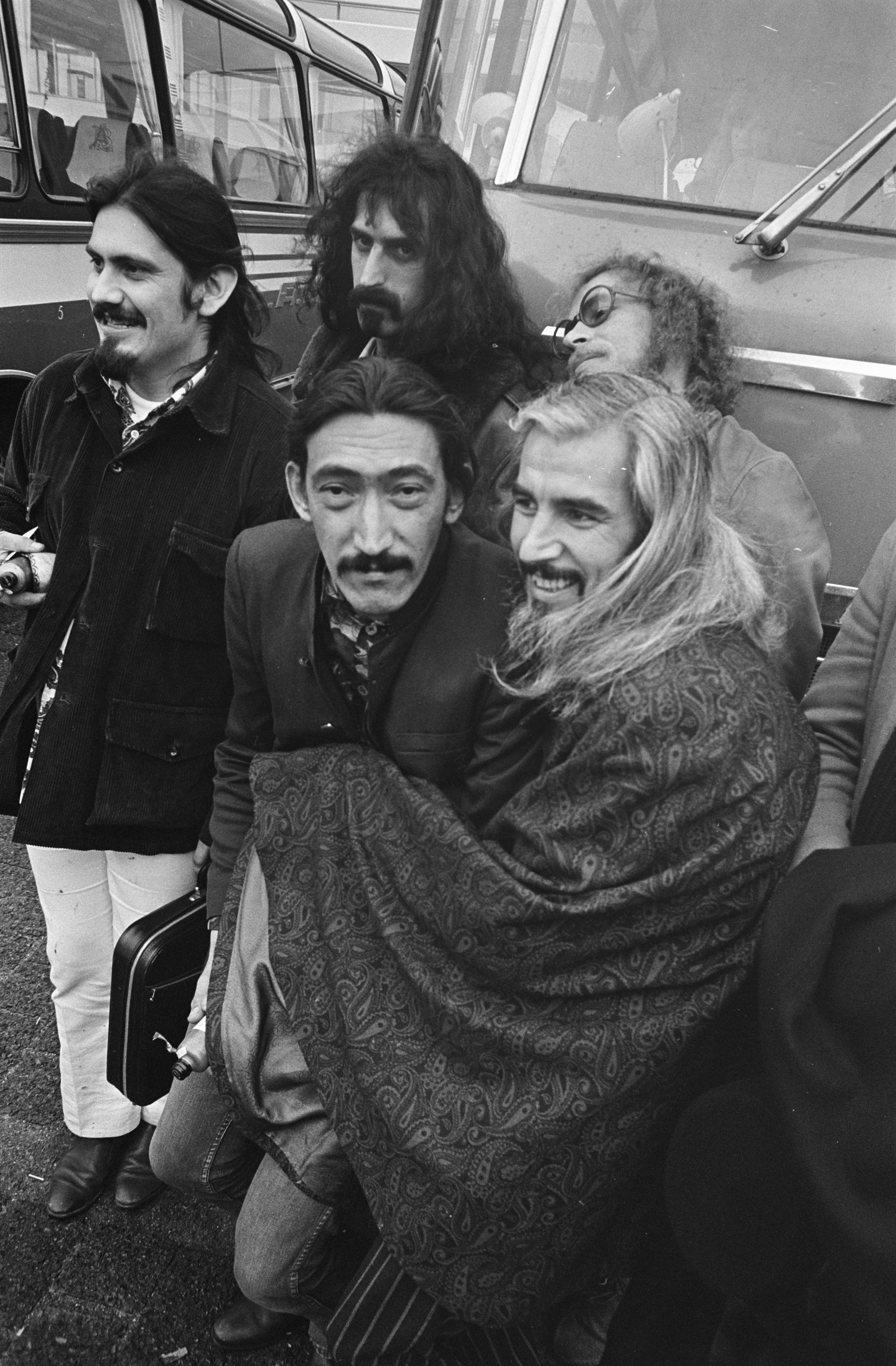
Roy Estrada (left) with Frank Zappa and The Mothers of Invention (1968)

With drummer Jimmy Carl Black and vocalist Ray Collins, Estrada was an original member of Frank Zappa's Mothers of Invention. Previously, Estrada had been a founding member of the Soul Giants, the band from which the Mothers of Invention was formed. In addition to playing bass guitar, Estrada sang vocals—often in a falsetto in Zappa's arrangement of doo-wop harmonies. On the 1969 album studio Uncle Meat, for example, he was credited with bass guitar and "Pachuco falsetto."

Prior to the Soul Giants, Estrada fronted a band called Roy Estrada and the Rocketeers. The group released at least one single on the King label, "Jungle Dreams (Part 1)" backed with "Jungle Dreams (Part 2)".

In addition to his work with Zappa, Estrada formed Little Feat with Lowell George, Richie Hayward and Bill Payne in 1969, playing bass and singing backing vocals on their first two studio albums before quitting in 1972 to join Captain Beefheart's Magic Band. Beefheart gave him the nickname "Orejón" ('big ears'). Estrada returned to Zappa's band for a tour that ran from September 1975 to March 1976. The posthumous Zappa archival release Joe's Camouflage featured pre-tour rehearsal recordings, while recordings from the tour appeared on the archival releases FZ:OZ, Joe's Menage and Zappa ’75: Zagreb/Ljubljana. Zappa's 1976 studio album Zoot Allures included one track from the tour as well as studio recordings with Estrada on backing vocals. Estrada later provided vocals and acting for Zappa's 1979 film Baby Snakes, and vocal work for the 1980s Zappa studio albums Ship Arriving Too Late to Save a Drowning Witch, The Man from Utopia and Them or Us.

== Session work ==
Estrada had also done session work by playing bass for a diverse range of artists, including Ry Cooder on his eponymous debut studio album, Ivan Ulz, Leo Kottke, Van Dyke Parks and Howdy Moon.

== Grande Mothers ==
In 2002, two years after his release from jail, Estrada joined forces with fellow former Mothers Don Preston and Napoleon Murphy Brock, along with guitarist Ken Rosser and drummer and percussionist Christopher Garcia, to form "The Grande Mothers". They performed at numerous concerts and festivals throughout the United States, Canada and Europe, including Austria, Belgium, Croatia, Czech Republic, Denmark, the UK, Germany, the Netherlands, Italy, Norway and Switzerland. In 2005, guitarist Miroslav Tadić replaced Ken Rosser in the line-up. Robbie "Seahag" Mangano was the guitarist for all of the European Grande Mothers' tours from 2009-2012. Mike Miller and Max Kutner played guitar for the band following.

In 2003 Estrada was featured on the album Hamburger Midnight (taking its title from a George/Estrada co-composition on the first Little Feat studio album) on the record label Inkanish Records, on which he collaborated once again with Jimmy Carl Black.

== Sex offender status and death ==
Estrada was convicted in Colorado on October 27, 1977, of sexual assault on a child, according to the Texas Department of Public Safety's Public Sex Offender website. On December 9, 1994, he was convicted in California of lewd or lascivious acts with a child under 14 and served six years in prison in Orange County, California. In January 2012, he pleaded guilty to a charge of continuous sexual abuse of a female family member younger than 14, which happened in March 2008. In the plea bargain agreement, he was sentenced to 25 years in prison and was not eligible for parole.

Estrada died on August 14, 2025, while hospitalized in Conroe, Texas, at the age of 82. He had been incarcerated at the W.J. Estelle Unit in Huntsville, having been transferred there only four months prior on April 14.

== See also ==
- Roots rock
- Blues rock
- Roots music
