= My Guitar Wants to Kill Your Mama =

Song written by Frank Zappa

"My Guitar"

Single by The Mothers of Invention

from the album Weasels Ripped My Flesh
- B-side: "Dog Breath"
- Released: September 1969
- Recorded: February 1969; August or September 1969
- Studio: Criteria Studios, Miami; TTG Studios, Los Angeles; Whitney Recording Studios, Glendale
- Genre: Hard rock, comedy rock, experimental rock
- Length: 3:07 (Single version); 3:35 (Weasels Ripped My Flesh version)
- Label: Bizarre, Reprise
- Songwriter(s): Frank Zappa
- Producer(s): Frank Zappa

Frank Zappa singles chronology
| "Anyway the Wind Blows" (1969) | "My Guitar" (1969) | "WPLJ" (1970) |

"My Guitar Wants to Kill Your Mama" is a song written by Frank Zappa and originally recorded by The Mothers of Invention in February 1969 at Criteria Studios (Miami), with overdubs recorded sometime between August and September 1969 at TTG Studios (Los Angeles) and Whitney Studios (Glendale, California). This version was included on their 1970 album Weasels Ripped My Flesh, an LP that included various recordings by the band from 1967 to 1969. A second version was released as a single on the Bizarre and Reprise labels as "My Guitar." Despite the more conventional naming, "My Guitar" did not chart.

The single version of the song, recorded in June 1969 at A & R Recording Studios in New York City, differs from the album version, includes a longer break before the second verse is reprised, and is roughly half a minute longer. A shorter edit of the single version has been released on You Can't Do That on Stage Anymore, Vol. 5.

His son Dweezil Zappa's 1988 solo album is named after the song and contains a cover of it, both as a tribute to his father. An a cappella version of the song is included on The Persuasions' 2000 Frank Zappa tribute album, "Frankly A Capella: The Persuasions Sing Zappa." The song was also covered by Joe Satriani, Steve Vai, and Eric Johnson on the 1996 G3 tour, and again by Satriani, Vai and Steve Lukather on the 2012 G3 tour.

The song was used in the show Daria, on the season two episode "That Was Then, This Is Dumb."

== The Central Scrutinizer ==
"The Central Scrutinizer"

Song by Frank Zappa

from the album Joe's Garage Act I
- Released: September 3, 1979
- Genre: Comedy rock
- Length: 3:28
- Label: Zappa
- Songwriter(s): Frank Zappa
- Producer(s): Frank Zappa

"The Central Scrutinizer," the spoken-word track that opens Act I of Joe's Garage, began as an updated version of "My Guitar Wants to Kill Your Mama." The two songs' chord progressions are identical.

== Track list ==
1. "My Guitar Wants To Kill Your Mama" – 3:07
2. "Dog Breath" – 2:56

== Personnel ==
"My Guitar Wants To Kill Your Mama", 1969 single version:

- Frank Zappa - lead vocal, guitar
- Roy Estrada - bass
- Don Preston - keyboards
- Ian Underwood - alto saxophone
- Bunk Gardner - tenor saxophone
- Motorhead Sherwood - baritone saxophone
- Jimmy Carl Black - drums
- Art Tripp - drums

"My Guitar Wants To Kill Your Mama", Weasels Ripped My Flesh album version:

- Frank Zappa - lead vocal, guitar
- Lowell George - guitar
- Don Preston - keyboards
- Ian Underwood - alto saxophone
- Bunk Gardner - tenor saxophone
- Motorhead Sherwood - baritone saxophone
- Buzz Gardner - trumpet, flugelhorn
- Roy Estrada - bass
- Jimmy Carl Black - drums
- Art Tripp - drums

"The Central Scrutinizer", 1979 version:

- Frank Zappa - vocals
- Warren Cuccurullo - guitar
- Denny Walley - guitar
- Peter Wolf - keyboards
- Arthur Barrow - bass
- Ed Mann - percussion
- Vinnie Colaiuta - drums
