= Muffin Men =

English rock band

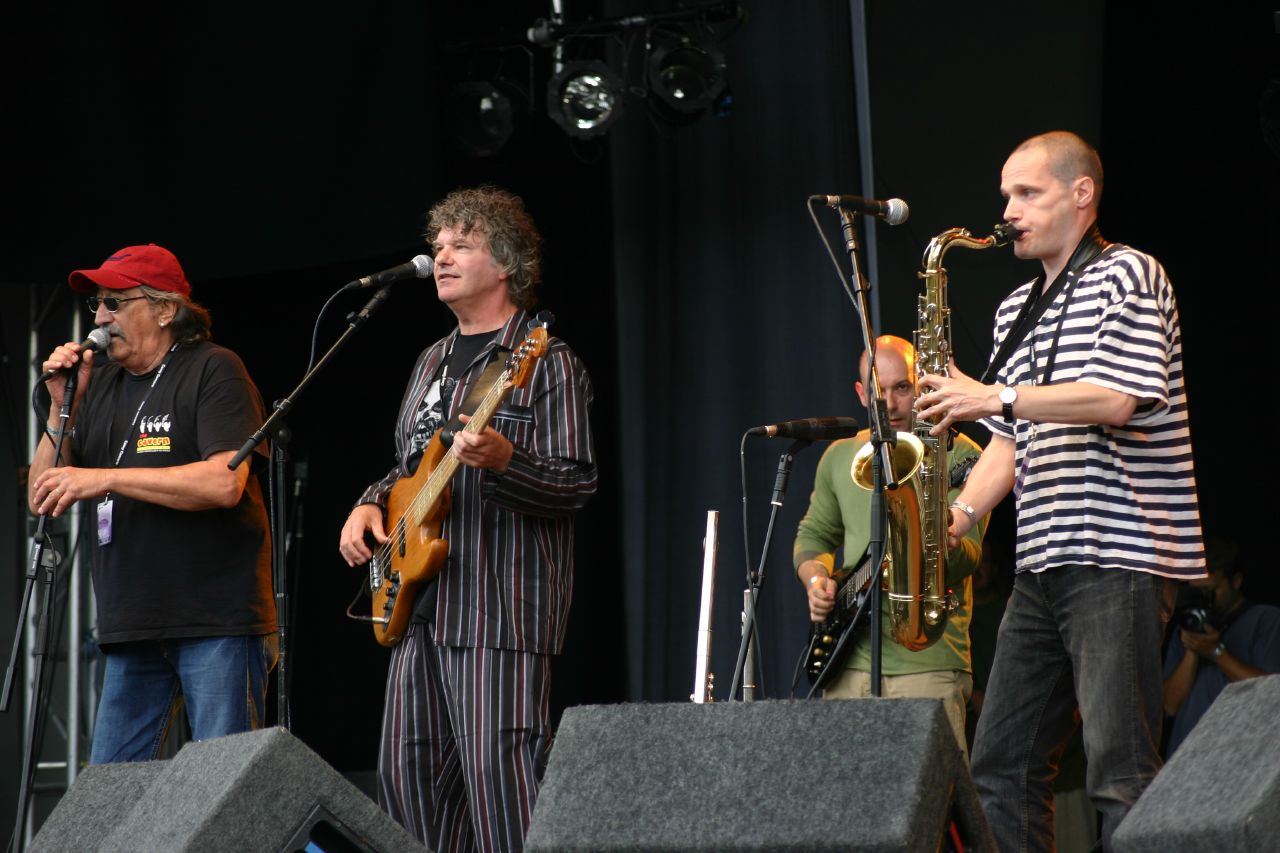
- The Muffin Men with Jimmy Carl Black (left); 12 August 2005

Background information
- Origin: Liverpool, England
- Genres: Alternative rock, jazz
- Years active: 1990–present
- Members: Ian Jump; Phil Hearn; Paul Ryan; Phil Oakes; Mike Kidson
- Past members: (Original lineup 1990); Ian (Bammo) Bamford; Paul (Rhino) Ryan; Mike Kidson; Andy (Waco) Jacobson; Roddie Gilliard; Naraish Nathaniel; Ian Jump; Roy Stringer (1956-2001); Later members: Steve Belger (1956-2020) (drums); Andy Frizell (bass, trombone flute etc.); Stefano Baldasseroni (drums); Dave Dominey (bass); Martin Smith (trumpet); Carl Bowry (guitar); Tilo Pirnbaum (drums); Mike Smith (keyboards, saxophone); Tony Whittaker (piano)

The Muffin Men are a British musical group founded in 1990 and based in Liverpool, England, which primarily plays the music of Frank Zappa and The Mothers of Invention.

Rather than play pieces note-for-note as originally written by Zappa, the band play their own interpretations of Zappa's material. They intend to cater to strengths of the current line-up, often giving the music a different slant from the original versions.

The group formed in 1990, originally to play a one-off concert to celebrate Zappa's fiftieth birthday. They are named after Zappa's 1975 song "Muffin Man". Prior to the COVID-19 pandemic the band toured for thirty unbroken years around the UK, Europe and Scandinavia, performing Zappa's music as a tribute band, along with some of their own compositions.

Until his death in 2008, the band often featured guest vocals and percussion Jimmy Carl Black, who performed with Zappa in the Mothers of Invention. With Black, they also performed material by Captain Beefheart.

In 1994 The Muffin Men played a nine-week European tour with guest vocalist/guitarist Ike Willis, and again teamed up with Willis in 2003 for a special Zappanale festival show, which also featured Napoleon Murphy Brock.

Mike Keneally has also appeared with the band, along with Ray White and Robert Martin.

Denny Walley toured and recorded with the band from 2010 to 2018.

The band's 25th anniversary gigs (2015) featured a core line-up of three original members – Rhino, Jumpy and Roddie, with Phil Hearn on keys. Past members from the previous lineups made guest appearances at a special show at The Cavern Club in Liverpool.

== Original lineup ==
- Ian (Bammo) Bamford – lead guitar and vocals
- Paul (Rhino) Ryan – drums and vocals
- Mike Kidson – saxophones, trousers and vocals
- Andy (Waco) Jacobson – keyboards and vocals
- Roddie Gilliard – guitar and vocals
- Naraish Nathaniel – bass and vocals
- Ian Jump – lead guitar and vocals
- Roy Stringer (1956–2001) – Apple Macintosh, samples, vocals and noises

The Muffin Men have played with many Zappa alumni. Special guests have included:

- Jimmy Carl Black (1938–2008) – drums
- Denny Walley – guitar
- Ike Willis – guitar and vocals
- Mike Keneally – guitar
- Ray White – guitar and vocals
- Robert Martin – vocals, keyboards, horn, saxophone
- Ed Mann – percussion
- Bunk Gardner – saxophone
- Don Preston – keyboards
- Napoleon Murphy Brock – saxophone
- Arthur Brown
- Eugene Chadbourne – guitar
- Ben Watson

== Discography ==
- 1992 – Let's Move To Cleveland/I'm the Slime (7-inch, 33 rpm vinyl single)
- 1992 – The Muffin Men (4-Track CD-Single)
- 1993 – Say Cheese And Thank You
- 1994 – Mülm (with Ike Willis)
- 1996 – Feel The Food
- 1996 – Frankincense (feat Jimmy Carl Black)
- 1998 – MufFinZ. (feat Jimmy Carl Black)
- 1999 – God Shave The Queen (feat Jimmy Carl Black)
- 2001 – More Songs From The Campfire. (feat Jimmy Carl Black)
- 2002 – Live @ The Cavern (feat Jimmy Carl Black)
- 2003 – Baker's Dozen (feat Jimmy Carl Black)
- 2003 – When Worlds Collide (with Ensemble 10:10)
- 2008 – Live in the Kitchen of Love (with Ike Willis) (limited fan release)
- 2008 – Looks Like Noodles To Me (with Ike Willis) (limited fan release)
- 2011 – Just Another Band from L4 (Limited Fan Release) – feat. Denny Walley, Robert Martin, Ben Watson
- 2015 – Sorry We're a Trifle... (Fan Release, limited to 25 copies, to commemorate 25 years in operation) USB card with a selection of live and studio recordings.
- 2019 – (It's All) Smoke and Mirrors – Live in the UK (limited fan release) – feat Denny Walley

The Muffin Men Videography:

- 1990–1997 – Muffin Movies Vol.1. (feat Jimmy Carl Black & Ike Willis)
- 1998–2003 – Muffin Movies Vol.2
- 2003 – Live at Zappanale 14 (with Ike Willis & Napoleon Murphy Brock)
- 2004–2005 – Muffin Movies Vol.3
- 2012 – Powdered Water. Cd/Promo DVD (Limited Fan Release) – Compositions of Frank Zappa & Don van Vliet feat. Denny Walley
