= Guarnera =

Guarnera is a surname. Notable people with the surname include:

- Charles Guarnera, also known as Buzz Gardner (1930–2004), American trumpet and flugelhorn player
- John Leon Guarnera, also known as Bunk Gardner (born 1933), American musician
