= Don Preston =

American jazz and rock keyboardist (born 1932)

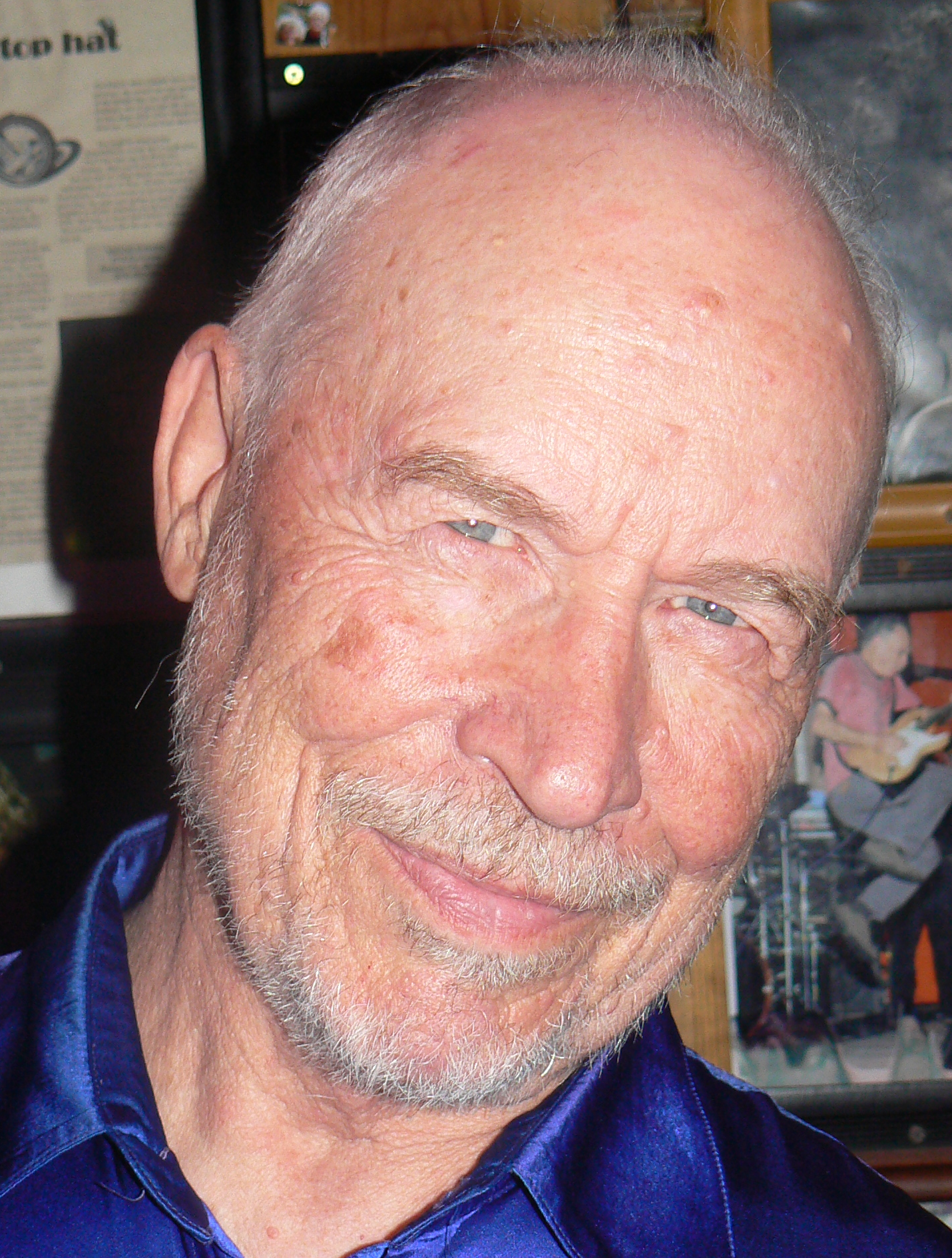
- Preston in 2012

Background information
- Born: Donald Ward Preston; September 21, 1932 (age 94); Flint, Michigan, U.S.
- Genres: Rock; jazz; electronic; experimental
- Occupation: Musician
- Instruments: Keyboards, Bass guitar
- Years active: 1950–present
- Formerly of: The Mothers of Invention

Donald Ward Preston (born September 21, 1932) is an American jazz and rock keyboardist. He is best known for being a member of the original version of Frank Zappa's band The Mothers of Invention during the late 1960s. He continued to work with Zappa during the early 1970s following the band's split.

== Early life ==
Preston was born into a family of musicians in Detroit and began studying music at an early age. His father played saxophone and trumpet, and had been offered the lead trumpet chair in the Tommy Dorsey Orchestra. Upon moving the family to Detroit, Don's father became the staff arranger for NBC, and was the composer-in-residence for the Detroit Symphony Orchestra. Don took sporadic lessons on the piano from the age of about five.

In 1950, Preston began a stint in the Army. He served in Trieste, Italy and played in the Army band (initially piano, bass drum and glockenspiel) alongside Herbie Mann. In Trieste he shared a barracks with fellow recruit Buzz Gardner, who introduced him to contemporary classical composers such as Béla Bartók, Anton Webern, Alban Berg and Arnold Schoenberg. Preston took up the bass while in the 98th Army band.

== Career ==
=== Early career ===
Upon his return to Detroit in 1953, Preston started playing bass with pianist Tommy Flanagan. He also sat in with Elvin Jones and others at the city's West End Cafe where Yusef Lateef conducted twice-a-week jam sessions with Milt Jackson's brother, bassist Alvin Jackson. Moving to Los Angeles in 1957, Preston played with the Hal McIntyre Orchestra and toured Canada backing Nat King Cole. Between 1958 and 1965, Preston played with a number of jazz artists, including Shorty Rogers, Charlie Haden, Paul Bley, Emil Richards and Paul Beaver.

=== Frank Zappa–related work ===
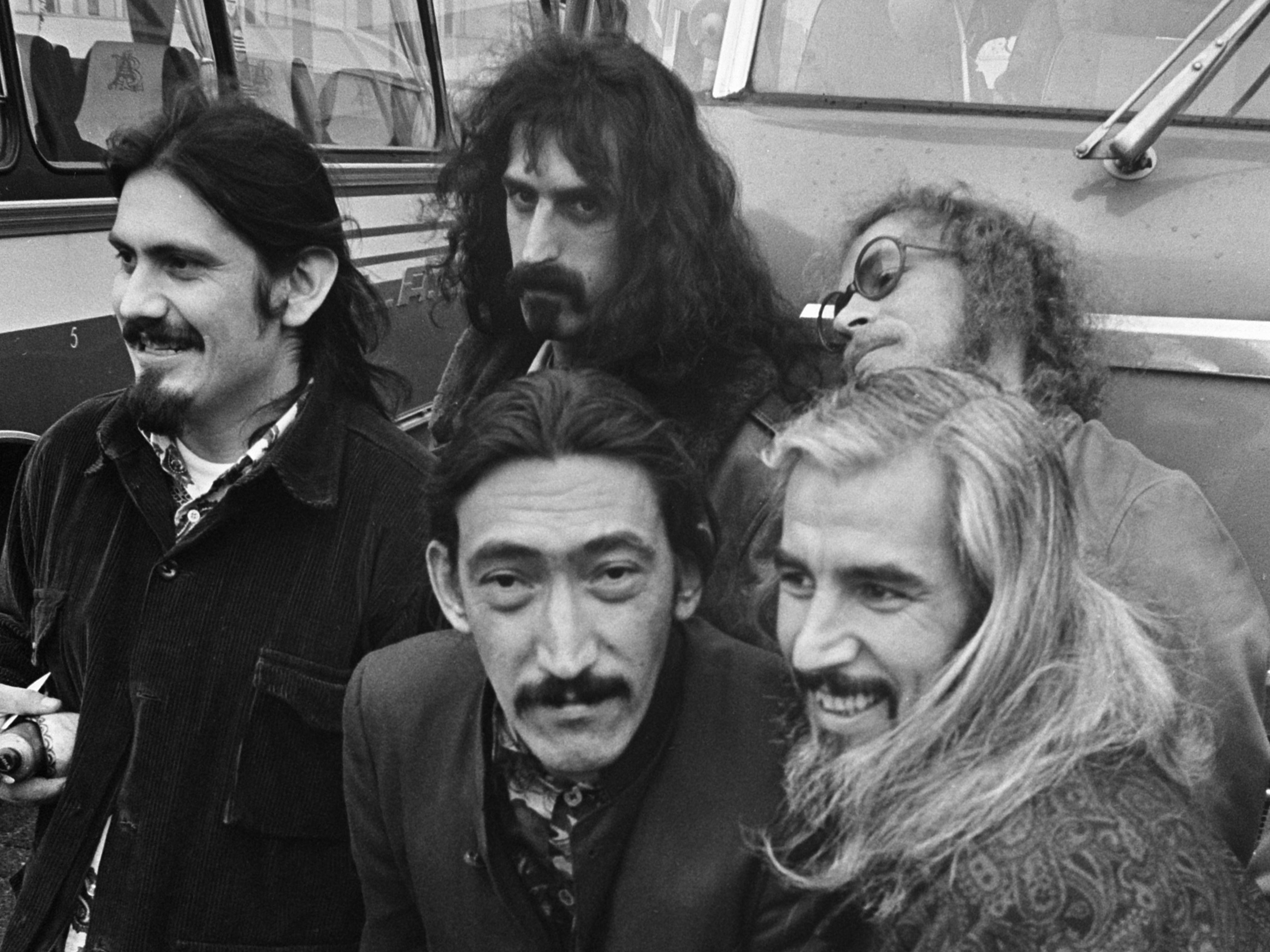
Don Preston (back row, right) with Frank Zappa & The Mothers (1968)

Preston first met Frank Zappa in 1961. Zappa would sometimes sit in with Preston's band he had at the time, which Preston described as "kind of an experimental band", and at one point was asked by Zappa to join a trio he was forming with an unknown drummer, who unsuccessfully auditioned at The Bank Club in Santa Ana.

In 1966, Preston began a long collaboration with Zappa as the keyboardist of the original Mothers of Invention, although originally his main instrument was a gong. Preston performed and recorded with Zappa until 1974. During that time he was music director for Meredith Monk (with whom he had previously shared a house) and started recording and performing electronic music.

He is a co-founder of the Grandmothers and toured with them from 2000 through 2016.

Preston also appeared on-stage as a guest keyboardist with the Zappa tribute band Project/Object (featuring Zappa alumni Ike Willis and Napoleon Murphy Brock) for several shows in 2001, 2002 and 2016.

In 2002, Don Preston joined forces with Frank Zappa alumni along with guitarist Ken Rosser, and drummer/percussionist Christopher Garcia to form the Grande Mothers Re:Invented. They performed at numerous concerts and festivals throughout America, Canada and Europe, including Austria, Belgium, Croatia, Czech Republic, Denmark, England, Germany, Holland, Italy, Norway and Switzerland. In 2005, guitarist, Miroslav Tadic replaced Ken Rosser in the lineup. Guitarist/bassist Robbie "Seahag" Mangano filled in for Miroslav Tadic on Grande Mothers tours in 2009 and 2010.

When speaking about if he looks upon the music of Frank Zappa differently when performing it in more modern times, Preston said: "Yeah, in many respects. Because performing it now is different than it was then. Then, you were under Zappa’s scrutiny, and there was always the fear of getting him mad if you fucked up. That doesn’t exist any more. Basically, we’re just having a lot of fun playing his music; the music is brilliant. We try not to screw it up; we think of Zappa looking down upon us while we play. We do our best. And most of the time that’s pretty good."

=== Other work ===
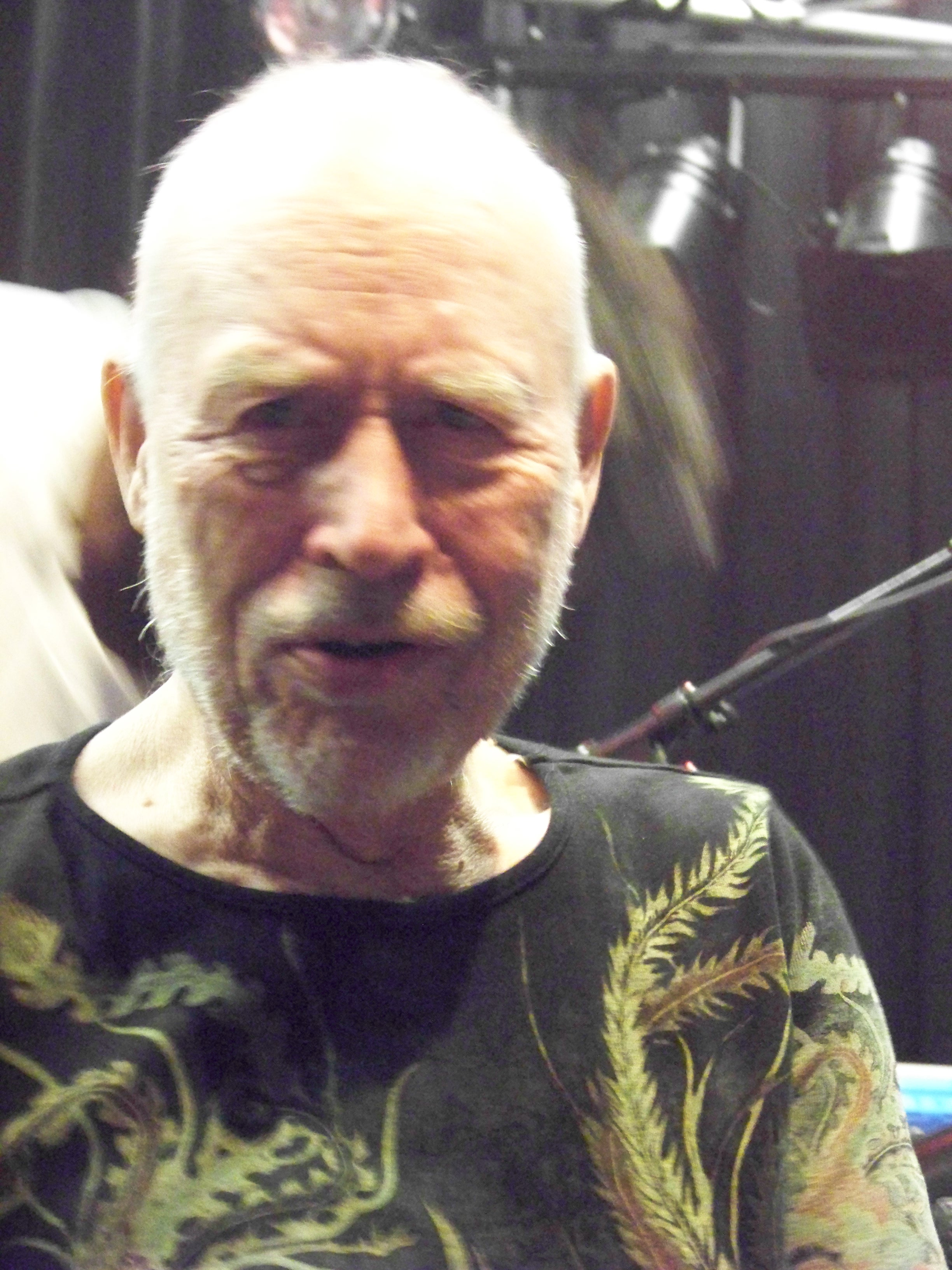
Don Preston 2009

Preston has played and recorded with the likes of John Lennon, Peter Erskine and Robby Krieger of The Doors. He has also scored more than 20 feature films and 14 plays.

Don has performed with many other artists, including: Lou Rawls, Al Jarreau, Billy Daniels, Johnnie Ray, Vaughn Monroe, Connie Francis, Art Davis, Carla Bley, Joe Beck, Leo Sayer, Charles Lloyd, Nelson Riddle, J.R. Monterose, Flo & Eddie (Howard Kaylan & Mark Volman of The Turtles), Don Ellis, Bobby Bradford, Michael Mantler and Yoko Ono.

Preston has lectured at Cornell, Harvard and Yale Universities, Sarah Lawrence College, University of Arizona and Queen’s University Belfast, where he usually talks about his musical career.

In 2010, Preston, together with his lifelong friend Bunk Gardner, started a collaboration with guitar player/composer Jon Larsen and Zonic Entertainment. The first recordings were an audio-autobiographical production, The Don Preston Story, followed by the electronic music, contemporary space drama Colliding Galaxies. Preston released his own book entitled "Listen".

Also around 2010, Preston and Bunk Gardner began touring as the Don & Bunk Show and twice toured the eastern part of the US. They later toured as a trio with Chris Garcia as The Grandmothers Of Invention.

Preston wrote the music for the film Dancing With Were-wolves, which was released in July 2016.

== Personal life ==
Don Preston is no relation to the Don Preston who played lead guitar for Joe Cocker and Leon Russell in the 1970s. However, the former has admitted to accidentally receiving (and unwittingly cashing) a royalty check intended for the latter some years ago.

== Awards and recognition ==
Preston is the winner of numerous awards, and has performed with the Los Angeles Philharmonic and London Philharmonic. Known to jazz and keyboard aficionados for his pioneering contributions in the use of synthesizers, legendary clarinetist and composer John Carter dubbed Don Preston the "father of modern synthesis."

From his Cryptogramophone Records biography: "Often compared to Cecil Taylor for his style of attacking the keys with intense passion, Preston’s solos also reflect intellect, technical skills and a storyteller's way with a line. His playing, like his compositions, ranges across panoramas of mood and emotion, all colored with the freedom that comes from possessing remarkable facility.

== Discography ==
- 1992: Dom De Wilde Speaks
- 1993: Vile Foamy Ectoplasm
- 1997: Hear Me Out
- 2001: Io Landscapes
- 2001: Corpus Transfixum
- 2001: Music from Blood Diner & Other Films
- 2002: Transcendence
- 2004: Aysymetrical Construct with Bobby Bradford and Elliot Levine
- 2007: Vile Foamy Ectoplasm (expanded from 1993)
- 2009: 26 Pieces for Piano & Violin with Harry Scorzo
- 2010: Colliding Galaxys (Zonic Entertainment)
- 2011: Escape from 2012 with percussionist Andrea Centazzo
- 2012: The Don Preston Story with Jon Larsen, interview
- 2012: Filters, Oscillators & Envelopes 1967–1982

As Don Preston Trio (with Joel Hamilton and Alex Cline)

- 2001: Transformation

As Don Preston's Akashic Ensemble

- 2003: Inner Realities of Evolution
- 2005: Tetragrammaton

As The Don & Bunk Show (with Bunk Gardner)

- 2000: Necessity Is...
- 2002: Joined at the Hip
- 2014: The Don and Bunk Show

With Frank Zappa/The Mothers of Invention/The Mothers

- 1967: Absolutely Free
- 1968: We're Only in It for the Money
- 1968: Cruising with Ruben & the Jets
- 1969: Mothermania
- 1969: Uncle Meat
- 1970: Burnt Weeny Sandwich
- 1970: Weasels Ripped My Flesh
- 1971: Fillmore East – June 1971
- 1972: Just Another Band from L.A.
- 1972: Waka/Jawaka
- 1972: The Grand Wazoo
- 1974: Roxy & Elsewhere
- 1985: The Old Masters Box One Mystery Disc
- 1986: The Old Masters Box Two Mystery Disc
- 1988: You Can't Do That on Stage Anymore, Vol. 1
- 1989: You Can't Do That on Stage Anymore, Vol. 3
- 1991: You Can't Do That on Stage Anymore, Vol. 4
- 1992: You Can't Do That on Stage Anymore, Vol. 5
- 1992: You Can't Do That on Stage Anymore, Vol. 6
- 1992: Playground Psychotics
- 1993: Ahead of Their Time
- 1996: The Lost Episodes
- 2004: Quaudiophiliac
- 1991: Beat the Boots: The Ark
- 1991: Beat the Boots: Unmitigated Audacity
- 1991: Beat the Boots: 'Tis the Season to Be Jelly
- 1992: Beat the Boots II: Electric Aunt Jemima
- 1992: Beat the Boots II: Swiss Cheese/Fire!
- 1992: Beat the Boots II: Our Man in Nirvana
- 2010: Greasy Love Songs

With The Grandmothers

- 1981: The Grandmothers
- 1982: Looking Up Granny's Dress
- 1983: Fan Club Talk LP
- 1994: Who Could Imagine
- 2001: Eating the Astoria
- 2001: 20 Year Anthology of the Grandmothers
- 2001: The Eternal Question
- 2003: A Grandmothers Night at The Gewandhaus
- 2014: Live in Bremen
- 2018: Free Energy

=== As a guest ===
With Ant-Bee

- 1993: The *#!%%? of Ant-Bee – Rarities Vol. 3
- 1993: Snorks and Wheezes
- 1994: The Bizarre German E.P.
- 1994: With My Favorite "Vegetables" & Other Bizarre Muzik
- 1997: Lunar Muzik
- 2011: Electronic Church Muzik

With John Carter

- 1987: Dance of the Love Ghost
- 1988: Shadows on a Wall
- 1989: Comin' On
- 1990: Fields

With Eugene Chadbourne

- 1993: 10 Most Wanted
- 1994: Locked in a Dutch Coffeeshop with Jimmy Carl Black

With Robby Krieger

- 1982: Versions
- 1985: Robby Krieger

With Michael Mantler

- 1985: Alien
- 1987: Live
- 1996: The School of Understanding

With Sandro Oliva

- 1995: Who the Fuck Is Sandro Oliva
- 2004: Heavy Lightning

With Sixstep

- 2013: "I'm Not an Atheist (Yet)" (single)
- 2013: "Hear No Evil"

With others

- 1969: Trout Mask Replica - Captain Beefheart & His Magic Band
- 1969: Permanent Damage - The GTOs
- 1971: The Visit - Bob Smith
- 1971: Escalator over the Hill - Carla Bley/Paul Haines
- 1972: Some Time in New York City - John Lennon
- 1972: The Phlorescent Leech & Eddie - Flo & Eddie
- 1972: Geronimo Black - Geronimo Black
- 1974: Satin Doll - Bobbi Humphrey
- 1979: Eskimo - The Residents
- 1979: Apocalypse Now - Soundtrack
- 1989: Ivo - John Patitucci/Peter Erskine/Airto/Ivo Perelman
- 1989: Where Flamingos Fly - Gil Evans
- 1989: Aurora - Peter Erskine/Buell Neidlinger
- 1992: Jefferson Airplane Loves You - Jefferson Airplane
- 1999: God Shave the Queen - Muffin Men
- 2003: On Time - Arthur Barrow
- 2011: Beyond the Holographic Veil - J21

== Film scores ==
- Android (1982)
- The Being (1983)
- Night Patrol (1984)
- Eye of the Tiger (1986)
- Blood Diner (1987)
- The Underachievers (1987)
- Pucker Up and Bark Like a Dog (1989)
- Believe in Eve (1991)
