= With My Favorite "Vegetables" & Other Bizarre Muzik =

Studio album by Ant-Bee
- Released: 1994
- Recorded: 1990–1992 at DH Studio, North Hollywood, California
- Genre: Psychedelic rock
- Length: 53:58
- Label: Divine
- Producer: Billy James

Ant-Bee chronology
Pure Electric Honey (1990)	With My Favorite "Vegetables" & Other Bizarre Muzik (1994)	Lunar Muzik (1997)

Professional ratings
Review scores
Source	Rating
Allmusic	4/5 stars

With My Favorite "Vegetables" & Other Bizarre Muzik is the second album by Ant-Bee, released in 1994 through Divine Records.

== Track listing ==
No.	Title	Writer(s)	Length
1.	"Lunar Egg-Clips Runs Amuck"	Ant-Bee	3:52
2.	"The Girl With the Stars in Her Hair"	Ant-Bee	6:36
3.	"Motorhead Snorks/Motorhead Speaks"	Jim Sherwood	1:08
4.	"The Live Jam" (Once the Clothes Are Off/Stringbeans, Greenbeans + Other Assorted Vegetables/Moonpie – Cooked)	Ant-Bee	14:11
5.	"Jimmy Carl Black Speakin' at Ya"	Jimmy Carl Black	1:41
6.	"In a Star"	Ant-Bee	3:14
7.	"Do You Like Worms?"	Van Dyke Parks, Brian Wilson	4:51
8.	"Bunk Speaks"	Bunk Gardner	2:51
9.	"Another Garden Variation"	Bunk Gardner	1:18
10.	"Pachuco Falsetto Laughs"	Roy Estrada	0:14
11.	"Here We Go Round the Lemon Tree" (The Fungus/Lunar Egg-Clips Walks with the Fungus)	Roy Wood	3:05
12.	"Who Slew the Beast"	Ant-Bee	6:15
13.	"Dom Dewild Speaks"	Don Preston	2:27
14.	"Dom Dewild Tranzforms [sic] (Before Your Very Ears)"	Don Preston	1:11
15.	"Dom Dewild Speaks Again"	Don Preston	1:04

== Personnel ==
Musicians

- Greg Brosius (Lunar Egg-Clips) – keyboards, freaky laughter
- Bunk Gardner – saxophone, snorks, wheezes, assorted screams
- Billy James (The Ant-Bee) – vocals, drums, percussion, keyboards, mellotron, tape manipulations, production, illustration
- Paul Lamb (Mr. Lambchop) – bass guitar, French horn
- Rod Martin (Mod Martion) – guitar
- Marc Ray Oxendine (The Tragic Sunbeam) – bass guitar, psaltery
- Don Preston (Dom DeWilde) – keyboards, vegetables, assorted transformations
- Scott Renfroe (Reoccurring Schizms) – tape manipulations

Production and additional personnel

- Jimmy Carl Black (The Indian of the Group) – spoken word, assorted munchkinisms
- John Criss (Mr. Crisp) – piano on "Moonpie"
- Roy Estrada (Pachuco Falsetto) – bizarre laughter
- Roy Herman (Herman Monster) – guitar on "Moonpie," "Lunar Egg-Clips Run Amuck," "The Girl With The Stars In Her Hair," "The Live Jam," "Here We Go Round The Lemon Tree," and slide and electric guitar on, "Do You Like Worms."
- Scott Kolden (Nedlok Tocs) – engineering, recording
- Alan McBrayer – illustrations
- Jim Sherwood (Euclid James Sherwood) – snorks, spoken word
- Dan Simon – engineering
- Rick Snyder (Purple Plastic Pengui) – bass guitar on "Worms"
