= Electronic Church Muzik =

Studio album by Ant-Bee
- Released: February 28, 2011
- Genre: Psychedelic rock
- Length: 64:05
- Label: Barking Moondog
- Producer: Billy James

Ant-Bee chronology
Lunar Muzik (1997)	Electronic Church Muzik (2011)

Electronic Church Muzik is the fourth studio album by Ant-Bee, released on February 28, 2011, by Barking Moondog Records. Recorded over the course of several years, it features musical contributions from members of The Alice Cooper Group, Flash, Focus, Gong, The Magic Band, The Mothers of Invention and Utopia.

== Track listing ==
No.	Title	Writer(s)	Length
1.	"Birth"	Billy James, Gilli Smyth	2:10
2.	"Living"	Michael Bruce, Glen Buxton, Alice Cooper, Dennis Dunaway, Neal Smith	3:55
3.	"The Language of the Body"	Billy James, Daevid Allen	5:15
4.	"Eye of Agamoto"	Don Preston	4:47
5.	"The Guff (Hall of Souls)"	Peter Banks, Billy James, Gilli Smyth	1:17
6.	"Mallard Flies Towards Heaven"	Bill Harkleroad	3:09
7.	"Ant-Bee's Sunday Supper"		0:28
8.	"Flutter-Bye, Butter-Flye"	Michael Bruce, Billy James	3:32
9.	"Endless Journey"	Peter Banks	6:02
10.	"The Light"	Billy James, Alessandro Pizzin	1:26
11.	"Mannah"	Jan Akkerman	5:35
12.	"Psalm 23"		1:10
13.	"Hallelujah"	Peter Frohmader, Billy James	2:57
14.	"The Wrath – Part One (The Flood)"	Billy James	2:59
15.	"Secrets of the Dead"	Bruce Cameron, Billy James	3:47
16.	"Pennies From Heaven"	Johnny Burke, Arthur Johnston	0:48
17.	"The Wrath – Part Two (Baptism Through Fire)"	Billy James	3:11
18.	"The Lords Prayer"		1:04
19.	"Angels"		0:25
20.	"Don't You Ever Learn?"	Todd Rundgren	4:37
21.	"Re-Birth"	Billy James, Gilli Smyth	4:51
22.	"Final Benediction – Lord We Thank You"		0:27

== Personnel ==
Adapted from Electronic Church Muzik liner notes.

- Billy James (as The Ant-Bee) – vocals (2, 8, 15), tape (3, 4, 10, 11, 13–15, 17, 20), percussion (1–6, 8, 9, 13, 15, 20, 21), Mellotron (8, 11, 14, 20), vibraphone (4, 13, 14, 20), guitar (1, 21), keyboards (2, 14), harp (6, 14), cuíca (4), washboard (6), violin (8), choir (12), production

Musician

- Jan Akkerman – guitar (11)
- Daevid Allen – vocals (3, 21)
- Artemiy Artemiev – keyboards (12)
- Peter Banks – guitar (5, 9)
- Jimmy Carl Black – spoken word (4)
- Mark Boston (as Rockette Morton) – bass guitar (6)
- Michael Bruce – guitar (2, 8), bass guitar (2, 8), sitar (2), vocals (7), keyboards (8)
- Napoleon Murphy Brock – vocals (20)
- Bruce Cameron – guitar (15), bass guitar (15), sitar (15)
- Jack Dougherty – pedal steel guitar (20)
- Peter Frohmader – keyboards (13), electronics (13)

Musician (cont.)

- Bunk Gardner – saxophone (2, 3, 4, 20), flute (1)
- Buzz Gardner – trumpet (3)
- Cor Gout – vocals (10)
- Moogy Klingman – keyboards (20)
- Bill Harkleroad (Zoot Horn Rollo) – guitar (6)
- Mike Logiovino – bass guitar (9)
- Rod Martin – trumpet (2, 3)
- Groucho Marx – vocals (16)
- Zad McGough – background vocals (20)
- Alessandro Pizzin – keyboards (10)
- Don Preston – Moog synthesizer (3, 20), keyboards (3, 4), electronics (3)
- George Scala – recorder (8)
- Jim Sherwood (as Motorhead) – snorks (4)
- Gilli Smyth – vocals (1, 5, 21), spoken word (17)

== Release history ==
Region	Date	Label	Format	Catalog
United States	2011	Barking Moondog	CD	0026132246
