= WPLJ =

K-Love radio station in New York City

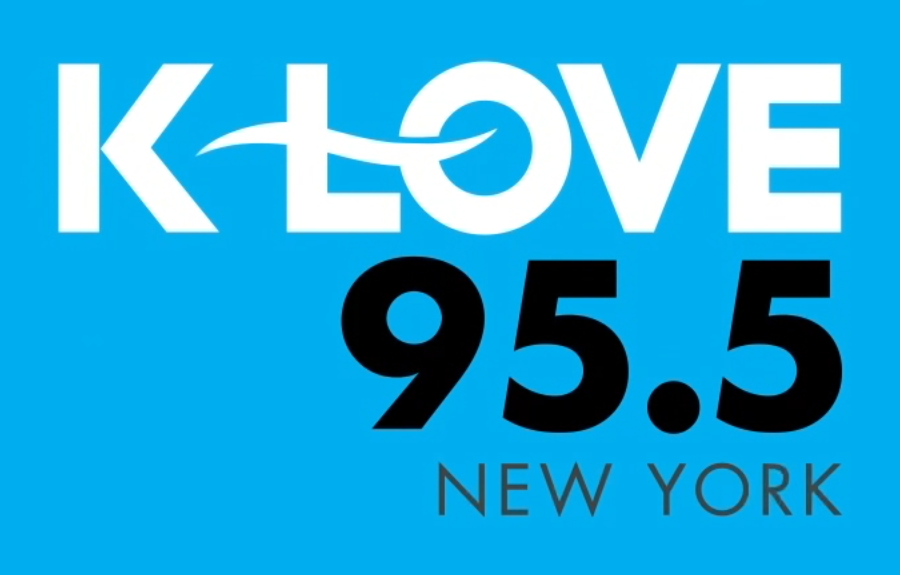
- New York, New York; United States
- Broadcast area: New York metropolitan area
- Frequency: 95.5 MHz (HD Radio)
- Branding: K-Love

Programming
- Language: English
- Format: Christian adult contemporary
- Subchannels: HD2: Air1; HD3: Simulcast of WRDR (Christian radio); HD4: Radio Nueva Vida (Spanish Christian)
- Network: K-Love

Ownership
- Owner: Educational Media Foundation; (K-LOVE Inc.)
- Sister stations: WARW; WPLF

History
- First air date: May 4, 1948
- Former call signs: WJZ-FM (1948–1953); WABC-FM (1953–1971); WPLJ (1971–1987); WWPR (1987–1988)
- Call sign meaning: named after the Four Deuces song "W-P-L-J" (artifact of former format)

Technical information
- Licensing authority: FCC
- Facility ID: 73887
- Class: B
- ERP: 6,700 watts
- HAAT: 408 meters (1,339 ft)
- Transmitter coordinates: 40.748°N 73.986°W
- Translators: ( HD4: 94.3 MHz) W232AL (Pomona); (94.9 MHz) W235BB (Hauppauge); (104.5 MHz) W283BA (Selden)
- Repeater: (103.3 MHz) WPLF (Shelter Island)

Links
- Public license information: Public file; LMS
- Website: www.klove.com

WPLJ (95.5 FM) is a non-commercial, listener-supported radio station, licensed to New York, New York. Owned by the Educational Media Foundation (EMF), based in Franklin, Tennessee, it broadcasts EMF's Christian adult contemporary formatted programming service, "K-Love".

WPLJ is a Class B FM station, with an effective radiated power (ERP) of 6,700 watts, transmitting from atop the Empire State Building in Midtown Manhattan. WPLJ broadcasts on several HD Radio digital subchannels in addition to its analog transmission. It is also heard on three FM translators around the New York metropolitan area: 94.3 MHz in Pomona, 94.9 in Hauppauge and 104.5 in Selden.

== History ==
=== As WABC-FM ===
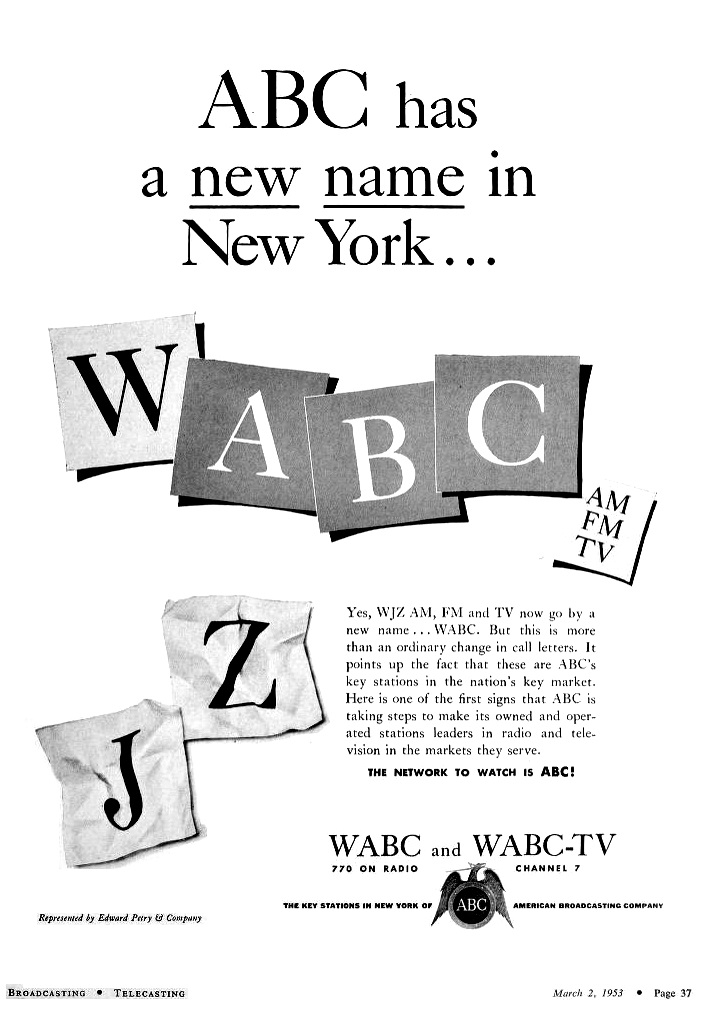
1953 advertisement announcing the call letter change from WJZ-FM to WABC-FM.

The station went on the air on May 4, 1948, under the call sign WJZ-FM. In March 1953, the station's call letters were changed to WABC-FM following the merger of the American Broadcasting Company (ABC) with United Paramount Theatres. As most FM stations did during the medium's formative years, 95.5 FM simulcast the programming of its AM sister station, WJZ/WABC (770 AM).

In the early 1960s, however, WABC-FM began to program itself separately from WABC (AM). During the 1962–63 New York City newspaper strike, the station programmed news for 17 hours daily. Two-and-a-half years before WINS launched its own around-the-clock, all-news format in April 1965, it was the first such attempt in the New York market. This was followed by stints with Broadway show tunes and general freeform programming, including broadcasts of New York Mets baseball games. WABC's AM personalities, such as Dan Ingram, Chuck Leonard, and Bob Lewis, hosted programs on the FM side which were the total opposites of the contemporary hit radio–powered sound for which they were better known on AM. WABC-FM continued to simulcast its AM sister station during Herb Oscar Anderson's morning drive program.

At the start of 1968, ABC split its radio network into four distinct components, one of which was dedicated to FM radio. The following year, WABC-FM and its sister stations—KABC-FM in Los Angeles; WLS-FM in Chicago; KGO-FM in San Francisco; WXYZ-FM in Detroit; KQV-FM in Pittsburgh; and newly acquired KXYZ-FM in Houston—began carrying an automated, youth-oriented, progressive rock format known as Love.

=== As WPLJ ===
==== Album rock era (1971–1983) ====
WPLJ's logo from the early 1970s. All of ABC's FM stations adopted this same logo style at this time; a version of this is still in use today by former sister station KLOS, which broadcasts on the same frequency.

In late 1970, Allen Shaw, the then-president of ABC's FM station group, announced two big changes to take place in early 1971: ABC dropped Love and installed completely live-and-local, freeform rock formats. The network also applied for call letter changes for the seven stations. The New York outlet was slated to be renamed WRIF, but a clerical error on the part of the Federal Communications Commission (FCC) resulted in those calls being awarded to the former WXYZ-FM in Detroit—whose own request for WDAI ("Detroit Auto Industry") was itself given mistakenly to WLS-FM in Chicago—leaving WABC-FM to start from scratch for its own rebranding. On February 13, at midnight, the station's call letters changed to WPLJ, chosen after Allen Shaw noticed the letter combination as the name of a song on the 1970 Mothers of Invention record, Burnt Weeny Sandwich. The song, "W-P-L-J", was originally performed by the Four Deuces in 1955, and stood for "White Port and Lemon Juice". On the air, the station hired John Zacherle, Alex Bennett, Vin Scelsa, Jimmy Fink, and Michael Cuscuna (from WMMR and WXPN in Philadelphia) as personalities. All seven ABC-owned FM stations also adopted a shared logo styling with the callsign and frequency within a multi-colored oval; WRIF and KLOS (the former KABC-FM) continue to use a form of this logo to the present day.

In September 1971, Allen Shaw and ABC programming executive Bob Henaberry designed and pioneered the very first album-oriented rock (AOR) format on WPLJ, playing only the best cuts from the best-selling rock albums with a minimum of disc jockey talk. Using the slogan "Rock 'N Stereo", the station played artists such as Led Zeppelin, The Beatles, Aerosmith, Jimi Hendrix, Cream, The Doobie Brothers, Steely Dan, Elton John, Deep Purple, Billy Joel, Rod Stewart, David Bowie, and The Allman Brothers. The station also played pop songs from artists such as James Taylor, Stevie Wonder, and Carly Simon, distinguishing itself from top 40 stations (such as co-owned WABC) by playing more tracks from their albums. The station's Arbitron ratings shot up dramatically, and WPLJ became New York's most listened-to FM rock station for most of the 1970s.

In 1973, ABC transferred Willard Lochridge, the general manager of WRIF in Detroit, to New York to manage WPLJ. The following year, Lochridge brought his Detroit program director, Larry Berger to WPLJ, and adopted a new slogan: "New York's Best Rock". Some of the personalities on the station during this period included Jim Kerr, Pat St. John, Jimmy Fink, Carol Miller, Tony Pigg, John Zacherle, Alex Bennett, Bob Marrone, and Dave Charity. Berger himself hosted a Sunday night call-in show, in which he discussed seemingly any topic with listeners—except the specifics of the playlist. During these call-in segments, some callers suggested that the station sped up (or "pitched up") the music so that they could fit in more commercials while still being able to claim that they played a large number of songs per hour. Berger repeatedly denied that this practice was in use at WPLJ. In the September 20, 1999, episode of Crap from the Past, host Ron "Boogiemonster" Gerber suggested that music was sped up on WPLJ to make the same music sound less dynamic on other stations.

Another Sunday night show began in 1973, then-Father Bill Ayres' long-running show, at first called On This Rock and later (after Ayres left the priesthood in the 1980s) titled The Bill Ayres Show. Known on-air as Father Bill Ayres, the show mixed spirituality and social consciousness together with the music of Harry Chapin, Bob Seger, and others. The show also aired on its sister station WABC on Sunday mornings within the last years of its contemporary hit radio music format. Ayres continued to host the show until the transfer of control of WPLJ to Educational Media Foundation in May 2019.

By the late 1970s, WPLJ tended to emphasize harder rock artists such as Led Zeppelin (there was a nightly "Get the Led Out" segment), Kansas, Boston, and Queen, which all happened to get less airplay than on competing station WNEW-FM. At this point, the station reduced its play of softer pop songs, and their ratings remained competitive. Mark Goodman came to WPLJ from Philadelphia in 1980 and was on the air as word broke out of John Lennon's murder the evening of December 8. Goodman departed the station a few months later to become one of the original VJs for the MTV cable channel. In 1981, Berger hired Marc Coppola, a rock-oriented disc jockey from suburban rival WBAB on Long Island, to do the 10 p.m.–2 a.m. shift Monday through Saturday.

During its AOR phase, the station was noted for its promotional montages consisting of snippets of classic rock songs spliced together by St. John, emphasizing a subject or theme, such as gasoline (during the gas shortages of the 1970s). From the time of Berger's arrival, WPLJ beat main rock rival WNEW-FM in virtually every Arbitron ratings period.

In 1982, WPLJ received a direct competitor in WAPP, which adopted a near-identical AOR format to WPLJ (WAPP launched its rock format commercial-free and remained so for the summer of 1982). WAPP beat WPLJ in the ratings in the fall of 1982, and WPLJ reacted by adding more new wave such as A Flock of Seagulls, Dexy's Midnight Runners, The Go-Go's, Elvis Costello, Men at Work, and Soft Cell, mixed in with the usual AOR fare. WPLJ's ratings ended up besting those of WAPP after the latter started playing commercials in the fall of 1982. In early 1983, the station added "Billie Jean" by Michael Jackson, playing it several times a day (many AOR stations, including WNEW-FM, added that song and it charted on the rock tracks chart). In March 1983, WPLJ added Jackson's other hit "Beat It", which received very positive reaction. While Jackson was not a typical AOR artist, that cut was played by many AOR stations due to Eddie Van Halen's role in the song. The station also dropped most 1960s songs by May and was cutting back on AOR artists while playing more contemporary rockers.

==== Top 40 era (1983–1992) ====
In early 1983, the station began a transition from AOR to contemporary hit radio. With word that a top 40 format was coming to WVNJ-FM (100.3 FM), WPLJ moved further in a CHR direction. Though the station began playing artists like Lionel Richie and Michael Jackson, Larry Berger stated that he did not make the decision to move to a CHR format until the last week of June; WPLJ adopted a rock-leaning CHR format on June 30, 1983. At that point, the station played predominantly AOR and new wave rock cuts, and mixed in two or three rhythmic pop cuts like "Flashdance... What a Feeling" by Irene Cara, "Time (Clock of the Heart)" by Culture Club, "She Works Hard for the Money" by Donna Summer, and others. The station maintained its "New York's Best Rock" slogan, even though the station moved away from playing predominantly rock songs. Berger discussed the changes on his call-in show in July 1983, to the disapproving reaction from the rock audience. (Competitor WNBC had been a de facto AM top-40 station while WYNY had been the de facto FM hits station throughout the early 1980s, playing many current songs as part of its hot adult contemporary format). WPLJ's airstaff, which stayed on during the early transition months, gradually changed, as WNEW-FM picked up some of the station's best-known disc jockeys such as Carol Miller and Pat St. John. (Jim Kerr and sidekick Shelli Sonstein remained with the station through the end of the decade.) Jimmy Fink, Tony Pigg, and Marc Coppola eventually moved to Infinity Broadcasting's WXRK when it debuted a couple of years later.

In August 1983, at the same time WVNJ had been re-christened as WHTZ ("Z100"), WPLJ became known as "The Home of the Hits", and in October, added top 40-style jingles. In a way, it was "New York's Hit Music Station" just before WHTZ went on the air. The following spring, WPLJ identified itself very briefly as "The New Musicradio PLJ" before segueing to "Hitradio 95" just a short time later. In early 1985, the station became known on-air as "Power 95". Ratings went up after switching to CHR, though they were still just behind Z100 most of the time.

On December 17, 1987, the station changed its call letters to WWPR (to complement its "Power 95" branding). (Rival WHTZ joked that the "PR" in the calls stood for "Puerto Rican" and that the station planned to flip to a Spanish-language format.) The WPLJ call-sign returned the following year, on December 21, 1988, when research indicated that listeners still identified the station as WPLJ. Berger departed in 1988, replaced immediately by his music director Jessica Ettinger, who was named acting program director. In 1989, general manager Dana Horner hired Gary Bryan from KUBE in Seattle as program director. Bryan also served as morning show host beginning that July, ousting 15-year WPLJ morning host veteran Jim Kerr, and creating an audience outcry.

WPLJ continued to be successful until 1990, when ratings started to decline. With significant pop competition—WQHT ("Hot 97") playing dance and Urban contemporary and WHTZ playing mainstream pop music—WPLJ dropped the "Power 95" branding and returned to identify by its call letters; musically, the station began leaning toward more pop-rock hits. In May, Bryan left the station to host rival WHTZ's morning zoo program beginning that August. ABC brass then replaced Horner with Mitch Dolan as general manager and president of programming, while Tom Cuddy was named vice president of programming, and Rocky Allen was named as the station's new morning host in August.

WPLJ began to regain some momentum; however, in early 1991, Cuddy and Dolan hired Scott Shannon, who had just left his rock hits project, KQLZ ("Pirate Radio") in Los Angeles. Shannon, who was responsible for WHTZ's early success and served as that station's first morning zoo host, took over as WPLJ's program director and morning show host (replacing Rocky Allen) in April 1991. The station then immediately rebranded as "Mojo Radio" on April 2 (Shannon's first show was on April 11), and the station began playing mainstream pop music, with ratings improving slightly. After Shannon had a series of morning show co-hosts over the summer, Todd Pettengill joined as his permanent co-host on August 19, 1991, forming Scott & Todd in the Morning. Also, WPLJ began dayparting its programming by leaning towards adult top 40 with more gold and recurrents being played during the daytime hours, while still playing some rhythmic material during the evening hours.

==== Hot AC era (1992–2019) ====
By February 1992, the station shifted to what was becoming a popular format: hot adult contemporary (hot AC), at about the same time a slightly different version was being pioneered in Houston at KHMX. In an attempt to differentiate itself from its competitors, WPLJ adopted the slogan "No Rap, No Hard Stuff, No Sleepy Elevator Music, Just the Best Songs on the Radio". In addition, the "Mojo Radio" moniker was dropped and the station began using the moniker "95-5 PLJ" (with the "W" typically omitted except for legal station identification).

The station playlist featured many songs familiar only to New Yorkers and obscure oldies that would not have been typical for the format in other markets. (In a bit of irony, WPLJ may have helped pioneer many of the concepts made popular by the diverse-playlist, music-intensive adult hits format of 2005.) Initially, WPLJ leaned towards 1970s hits, as well as mixing in liberal doses of disco, and did regular theme weekends featuring one-hit wonders and number-one songs, among others. Eventually, it also dedicated Monday-Saturday nights to playing nothing but 1970s music, hosted by former WKTU disc jockey Al Bandiero, a practice that continued for the next few years.

In January 1993, Rocky Allen returned to WPLJ, this time to do afternoon drive for several years, until moving to WABC for the morning drive slot in January 1999. (Allen returned again to WPLJ in late 2005.) A year after Allen's return, WPLJ hired John "Kato" Machay from KUBE Seattle to serve as the station's executive morning show producer and air talent, leading to the station winning Billboard's Morning Show of the Year award for five straight years. In 1995, WPLJ signed an agreement with Usen Group of Tokyo, a 500-channel audio cable system, to carry the station live in real-time throughout Japan. Also, from August 7 to 13 of that year, WPLJ was simulcast on Heart 106.2 in London as part of testing transmissions before it signed on September 5 with a hot AC format. In mid-1996, WPLJ began syndicating Scott & Todd to WMTX in Tampa, Florida (where Scott had launched the "morning zoo" concept into nationwide success), and WKLI-FM in Albany, New York (where Todd would get his first big-market break), with a nationwide syndication deal launching in May 1997. The syndication attempt ended October 16, 1998, as management desired to refocus the show to a local audience.

On February 5, 1999, WPLJ abruptly moved to a modern adult contemporary format, a variation of the hot AC format. The station eliminated all 1970s music from the playlist and changed its slogan to "New York's Hit Music Station Without the Rap" in an attempt to distance itself from competitors that played rap music. In addition, many on-air personalities exited, including Kristie McIntyre, Danny & Onions, WPLJ veteran Fast Jimi Roberts and, a short time later, Kato Machay. However, modern AC had peaked in 1997-98, and the station transitioned back to a hot AC format, with its playlist consisting of songs from the 1980s, 1990s, and the present.

==== 2000s ====
In 2005, with ratings in decline, WPLJ once again started to play more music from the 1970s and 1980s. Given its heritage as both a rock station in the 1970s and a pioneering hot AC in the early and mid-1990s, many people in the radio business saw this move as a precursor to the station switching to an adult hits format. However, they were beaten by WCBS-FM, which abruptly switched from oldies to the Jack FM format on June 3, 2005 (WCBS-FM would return to the oldies/classic hits format two years later). WPLJ returned to playing music of the late 1980s, 1990s, and 2000s.

While not an overall ratings success, WPLJ had for years been among the more financially successful stations in the New York City market, billing in excess of $40 million per year. WPLJ did extremely well with adult women in the lucrative nine northern New Jersey counties adjacent to New York City.

During its top 40 years, WPLJ used jingles from JAM Creative Productions, some of which were packages previously used on sister station WABC during its top 40 days; since becoming a hot AC station, WPLJ had used jingles from TM Studios.

WPLJ and WABC were included in the sale of ABC Radio and the ABC Radio Networks by The Walt Disney Company to Citadel, announced in February 2006 and finalized on June 12, 2007.

In late February 2008, the Rocky Allen Showgram featuring Rocky Allen and Blain Ensley was dropped as part of a company-wide series of staff cutbacks at Citadel. On February 16, 2009, WPLJ started airing the syndicated program The Billy Bush Show in the evenings. He was later replaced by local host Ralphie Aversa.

In April 2009, WPLJ adopted a new slogan, "Scott and Todd in the Morning and Today's Best Music". A new logo was introduced that July.

==== 2010s ====
On July 25, 2011, Scott and Todd, with the new addition of Cooper Lawrence, were part of a six-week summer test of 20th Television's nightly entertainment news magazine Dish Nation. In January 2012, 20th announced the return of Dish Nation for a full 52-week season with Scott and Todd as members of its four-city roundtable.

Citadel merged with Cumulus Media on September 16, 2011. By October 2011, adult contemporary rival WWFS (owned by CBS Radio) shifted to hot AC; this gave New York City two hot adult contemporary stations for the first time since 1998, when WBIX dropped it for a rhythmic oldies format.

On February 7, 2014, Scott Shannon announced his retirement from WPLJ after 22 years. Co-host Todd Pettengill immediately took control of the morning show, which re-branded as The Todd Show on February 24.

On January 5, 2015, The Todd Show was re-branded to Todd & Jayde in the Morning, with Jayde Donovan (Patricia Sweet) joining Pettengill as a co-host. With the change, co-hosts Cooper Lawrence, Fitz, and Meatballs (Richard Deaver Jr.) were all released. Monk (Joe Pardavila), Annie (Anne Marie Leamy), and Johnny on the Street (John Mingione, formerly 'John Online' of WBLI on Long Island) were the other cast members of Todd & Jayde in the Morning. During this time, due to increased competition, WPLJ re-added 1980s and 1990s songs to its playlist, as well as adding more rhythmic material. By November 2015, the station removed most of the 1980s music from its playlist.

=== Sale and transition to K-Love ===
"May the 48-year run of this radio station prove to be a testament to the power and the love of terrestrial radio. And may the mere thought of the letters P-L-J bring a smile to your face, a warmth to your heart, and a tingle to your ears.

"Here's to those who have walked these halls and breathed life into these microphones. It is with peace, love, and joy that we toast the white port lemon juice. Here's to 'PLJ!

"And for one final time–from high above Madison Square Garden–this is the world-famous WPLJ, New York."

— Race Taylor, from his "farewell toast" to WPLJ

On February 13, 2019, WPLJ and five other Cumulus Media stations were sold to the Rocklin, California-based nonprofit broadcaster, Educational Media Foundation (EMF) for $103.5 million. This transaction would allow Cumulus to generate "substantial cash for debt repayment and investment in other business opportunities," according to its President and CEO Mary Berner. After the sale received final approval by the FCC, EMF announced that WPLJ and the other Cumulus stations acquired would all begin broadcasting its primary programming service, K-Love, on June 1 at midnight local time; this was later moved up to May 31 at 7:00 pm, five hours earlier than originally planned.

Current and surviving former WPLJ air personalities and staffers gathered together for a farewell celebration, held at The Cutting Room on May 23. It was the first event in what would be a week-long celebration of the station's 48-year run, which continued through the Memorial Day weekend with the station "clearing out the library" by playing songs from each year between 1971 and the present, along with vintage jingles and sweepers. The penultimate broadcast day on May 30 was filled with guest appearances from WPLJ alumni, including an on-air reunion of Todd Pettengill and his former morning co-host, Scott Shannon. The current airstaff began their goodbyes as well and that continued into May 31, with the final air shift handled by afternoon personality Race Taylor.

The last songs heard on WPLJ were "Imagine" by John Lennon—the final song played by WABC before their format switch from Top 40 to talk in May 1982—followed by a cover version of "W-P-L-J" by Hall & Oates, recorded live during a visit by the group to the station several years earlier. Taylor then played the closing lyrics of "The End" by the Beatles, before offering WPLJ a final toast, completing the closedown at 7:02 pm. Following just over a minute of silence, EMF began operating WPLJ as the new New York City outlet of K-Love; K-Love programming had previously been heard in the New York area since May 2011 over Port Chester, New York-licensed WKLV-FM (96.7 FM). EMF changed WKLV-FM's call letters to WARW and its format to secondary service Air1 on July 19, 2019.

In addition to converting the 95.5 FM license to noncommercial educational status, EMF also acquired the WPLJ call letters from Cumulus.

== HD Radio ==
WPLJ signed on digital operations in late 2005. WPLJ-HD1 carries a digital simulcast of the analog signal. The WPLJ-HD2 subchannel originally broadcast all-70s hits, and then programming from Scott Shannon's True Oldies Channel that was distributed by ABC Radio. On July 4, 2014, WPLJ-HD2 flipped to an adult contemporary format known as "FAS" (referring to former sister station WFAS-FM, which flipped from AC to urban AC), due to the discontinuation of The True Oldies Channel's distribution. (The "FAS" programming was also relayed on translator W232AL (94.3 FM), located in White Plains, New York). The FAS programming moved to WPLJ-HD3 (which had previously aired a simulcast of WABC) in autumn 2017, with the Russian-language "Russkaya Reklama" programming moving from WNEW-FM-HD4 to WPLJ-HD2. On May 1, 2019, the FAS programming on WPLJ-HD3 and W232AL ceased operations.

After EMF acquired the station on May 31, 2019, WPLJ-HD2 adopted a simulcast of the Christian-formatted "Bridge Radio" fed by WRDR in Freehold Township, New Jersey (this would later be moved to WPLJ-HD4, with the K-Love Classics service being installed on the HD2). Also in 2019, WPLJ-HD3 adopted a simulcast of the Christian-formatted "Air1".

== Logo history ==
WPLJ logo used from 2005 to 2009

WPLJ logo used from February 24, 2014 to October 30, 2014.

WPLJ logo from October 30, 2014 to May 31, 2019.
