= Bullwhip (disambiguation) =

A bullwhip is a single-tailed whip, usually made of leather and originally used with livestock.

Bullwhip may also refer to:

- Bullwhip effect, an observed phenomenon in forecast-driven distribution channels
- Bullwhip (film), a 1958 film starring Rhonda Fleming
- "Bullwhip", a song by Geronimo Black from their self-titled album
