= Lunar Muzik =

Studio album by Ant-Bee
- Released: 1997
- Genre: Psychedelic rock
- Length: 49:39
- Label: Divine
- Producer: Billy James

Ant-Bee chronology
With My Favorite "Vegetables" & Other Bizarre Muzik (1994)	Lunar Muzik (1997)	Electronic Church Muzik (2011)

Professional ratings
Review scores
Source	Rating
Allmusic	4/5 stars

Lunar Muzik is the third studio album by Ant-Bee, released in 1997 by Divine Records.

== Track listing ==
No.	Title	Writer(s)	Length
1.	"Snorks & Wheezes"	Black, Estrada, Gardner, Preston, Sherwood	5:39
2.	"Child of the Moon"	Jagger/Richards	3:20
3.	"Blew a Banana Thru the Sun"	James	1:39
4.	"One Who Is Gold"	James	3:06
5.	"Silicone Hump"	Preston	1:36
6.	"Love Is Only Sleeping"	Mann, Weil	3:23
7.	"By-and-By I Touch the Sky" (Main Theme/The Swan & The Horseshoe Excerpts/The Platinum God Excerpts/Main Theme Revisited)	Bainbridge	9:57
8.	"Diva Gliss (Are You Sirius?)"	Allen, Williamson	6:47
9.	"Tears That Fall Unto the Sky"	James	3:27
10.	"Return of the Titanic Overture"	Bruce	4:29
11.	"Son of Snorks & Wheezes"	Black, Estrada, Gardner, Preston, Sherwood	6:16

== Personnel ==
Adapted from Lunar Muzik liner notes.

Musicians

- Daevid Allen (Father Gong) – guitar, engineering
- Harvey Bainbridge (Hawklord) – synthesizer, engineering
- Michael Owen Bruce (Mr. Nice Guy) – guitar, bass guitar, sitar, keyboards
- Paul Bruce (Little Joe) – keyboards
- Glen Buxton (Zillion Dollar Guitarist) – guitar
- Dennis Dunaway – bass guitar
- Bunk Gardner – saxophone, clarinet, spoken word, vegetables
- Billy James (The Ant-Bee) – vocals, guitar, bass guitar, drums, percussion, keyboards, tape manipulations, production
- Steve Kale (Brainyak) – guitar, harmonica
- J.K. Lofton (Mix Doctor) – guitar synthesizer, bass guitar, engineering
- Rod Martin (Mod Martion) – guitar, bass guitar
- Lan Nichols (Kapri-Korn) – bass guitar
- Don Preston (Dom DeWilde) – keyboards, spoken word, assorted transformations, engineering
- Scott Renfroe (Reoccurring Schizms) – guitar, bass guitar, tape manipulations
- Harry Williamson (Professor Drone) – synthesizer

Musicians (cont.)

- Jimmy Carl Black (The Indian of the Group) – spoken word, chanting
- The Bizarre Vocal Ensemble (Mike Rowell, Jeff Marden, Rod Martin, Alan McBrayer, Suzanne McBrayer) – vocals (1)
- Roy Estrada (Pachuco Falsetto) – bizarre laughter, spoken word, wheezing
- Bob Harris (Millet Pancake) – Great nostalgic chihuahua impersonations
- Roy Herman (Herman Monster) – additional guitar
- Mike McManimen (Monk) – additional keyboards
- Peter Radloff (James Bond) – additional guitar
- George Scala (Sonraw) – Master of the Recorder
- Jim Sherwood (Motorhead) – snorks
- Neal Smith (The Platinum God) – additional drums

Production and additional personnel

- Syd Barrett – illustrations
- Patrick Ogelvie – engineering
- Scott Renfroe – engineering

== Release history ==
Region	Date	Label	Format	Catalog
United States	1997	Divine	CD	20
