= Geronimo Black =

Geronimo Black was a short-lived hard rock band founded in 1972 by drummer Jimmy Carl Black. He named the group for his youngest son Geronimo.

The performers included members of other bands, principally from Frank Zappa's Mothers of Invention:

- Jimmy Carl Black, drummer, from The Mothers of Invention
- Andy Cahan, keyboards, previously worked with Dr. John
- Tjay Cantrelli (John Barberis), saxophone, previously from the band Love
- Bunk Gardner (John Leon Guarnera), horns, from The Mothers of Invention
- Buzz Gardner (Charles Guarnera), horns, from The Mothers of Invention
- Tom Leavey, bass
- Denny Walley, guitar, member of Captain Beefheart's Magic Band and also worked with Frank Zappa (1975-1979)

The group recorded an album for the Uni Records label at Sound City Studios in Los Angeles in 1972. The record producer was Keith Olsen who later went on to produce Fleetwood Mac's Rumors album.

After their manager Russ Regan stopped working with the group, according to guitarist Denny Walley,

no one... really knew what to do with the band in the company or how to promote us and they were really afraid of us. We were rowdy, drank a lot, did everything a lot. We were pretty uncontrollable and they wound up banning us from even coming onto the lot and that was the end of the record deal.'

After the band broke up, they briefly reformed to record a later album entitled Welcome Back, Geronimo Black for the Helios label. This album included ex-Magic Band guitarist Gerry McGee.

A later version of the group also recorded the album by "Geronimo Black Two", formed in 2003 by Jimmy's sons, Geronimo and James D. Black, which released a CD under their father's Inkanish Records label.

In 2019, Munster Records released Freak Out Phantasia, a collection of unreleased live and studio recordings.

== Discography ==
- Geronimo Black (1972, Uni)
1. Low Ridin' Man (Black, Cantrelli)
2. Siesta (Cahan, Contrelli, Gardner)
3. Other Man (Leavy, Walley)
4. L.A. County Jail '59 C/S (Cantrelli)
5. Let Us Live (Cahan)
6. Bullwhip (Cantrelli)
7. Quakers Earthquake (Cahan)
8. Gone (Walley, Leavy)
9. An American National Anthem (Moreno, Black)
10. '59 Chevy (single B-side - bonus track on CD re-issue)
- Welcome Back Geronimo Black (1980, Helios)
- Freak Out Phantasia (2019, Munster)
