= Four Deuces =

Rhythm and blues vocal quartet

The Four Deuces were an American rhythm and blues vocal quartet, formed in the mid-1950s in Salinas, California. The band was started by lead singer Luther McDaniel, and recorded several songs before they broke up around 1957. While active, the Four Deuces had moderate but short-lived popularity, mainly along the West Coast, mostly due to the frequent radio airplay of their hit song, "W-P-L-J".

== History ==
The band was formed when Luther McDaniel and a group of army friends from Fort Ord got together and began to sing gospel songs. They soon moved to rhythm and blues, and began to look for a record deal.

Moving to San Francisco, the band came into contact with Ray Dobard and his company, Music City Records. Once in the studio, they recorded "W-P-L-J", and a B-side called "Here Lies My Love." This record was released in February 1956 (see 1956 in music), and received wide radio airplay across the US. Besides in their home territory of San Francisco, the Four Deuces were especially popular in Philadelphia.

The Four Deuces returned to the studio later in the year and released another record, which featured "Down it Went" and "The Goose is Gone", but these were not as popular. The group broke up shortly after.

This group is not to be confused with the group that recorded "Polly/Yella Shoes" on Everest Records. That group was a white pop group, probably from New York.

== W-P-L-J ==
The Four Deuces were best known for their song "W-P-L-J", which stands for white port and lemon juice. This later became the jingle for wine producer Italian Swiss Colony.

=== The Mothers of Invention version ===
"WPLJ"

Single by The Mothers of Invention

from the album Burnt Weeny Sandwich
- B-side: "My Guitar Wants to Kill Your Mama"
- Released: February 1970
- Recorded: July 24, 1969
- Studio: TTG Studios, Hollywood
- Genre: Doo-wop
- Length: 3:02
- Label: Bizarre
- Songwriters: Ray Dobard, Luther McDaniel
- Producer: Frank Zappa

Frank Zappa singles chronology
| "My Guitar Wants to Kill Your Mama" (1969) | "WPLJ" (1970) | "Tell Me You Love Me" (1970) |

Frank Zappa and The Mothers of Invention covered the song in 1969, releasing it in 1970 on the album Burnt Weeny Sandwich. This version was both a satire of and a homage to the original, and Zappa has conceded admiringly that he could not have written a song any more absurd, stating during a concert in Toronto that the titular drink made him vomit.

The song prompted a rock radio station in New York then known as WABC-FM to change its call letters to WPLJ on February 14, 1971; it still uses the callsign to this day. A cover of the song by Hall and Oates was the last song played by the station as a commercial outlet on May 31, 2019.

== Discography ==
- "W-P-L-J" / "Here Lies My Love" (1956)
- "Down it Went" / "The Goose is Gone" (1956)

== See also ==
- Doo-Wop
