= WRDR =

Christian radio station in Freehold Township, New Jersey, United States

- Freehold Township, New Jersey; United States
- Broadcast area: New York metropolitan area
- Frequency: 89.7 MHz
- Branding: Bridge FM

Programming
- Language: English
- Format: Religious

Ownership
- Owner: Bridgelight, LLC

History
- First air date: June 27, 2003

Technical information
- Licensing authority: FCC
- Facility ID: 20485
- Class: A
- ERP: 1 watt horizontal; 1,600 watts vertical
- HAAT: 100.0 meters (328.1 ft)
- Transmitter coordinates: 40°7′49.4″N 74°07′17.4″W
- Translator: See § Translators
- Repeater: See § Simulcasts

Links
- Public license information: Public file; LMS
- Webcast: Listen live
- Website: www.bridgeradio.org

WRDR (89.7 FM, "Bridge FM") is a radio station broadcasting a Christian radio format. Licensed to Freehold Township, New Jersey, it serves the New York metropolitan area. The station is owned by Bridgelight, LLC. Bridgelight, LLC was created as a counterpart to Christian denomination Calvary Chapel Old Bridge.

The station simulcasts on WPLJ 95.5-HD3 in New York City and on several FM translators, as well as on WJUX (99.7 FM) in South Fallsburg, New York, formerly known as "Jukebox Radio".

== History ==
=== WRDR ===
Calvary Chapel Old Bridge's board approved providing the funding, and along with Cornerstone Calvary Chapel's help were able to form Bridgelight Media LLC and purchase WRDR in Howell, New Jersey. The station, renamed "The Bridge", went on the air for the first time on June 27, 2003. Shortly before sign-on, they were able to purchase the financially and legally troubled easy listening music outlet WJUX, which added another full power radio station on 99.7 FM and two translators on 103.1 and 94.3, increasing the potential coverage to over 6.5 million people, and enabling them to reach a good part of New York City.

Bridge FM holds "BridgeFest", an annual two-day music festival every summer in Ocean Grove, New Jersey, which features headline acts from notable Contemporary Christian music acts, as well as teachings, vendors, crafts, as well as surfing clinics and events.

=== WJUX ===
WJUX 103.1 from 1993 to 2004 was known as "Jukebox Radio" and originally played traditional big band music in 1993 before evolving to more of an adult standards format by 1995. By then, WJUX (99.7 FM) in Monticello, New York, began simulcasting "Jukebox Radio" and it began commercial operation.

Originally licensed as a non-commercial educational station, "Jukebox Radio" hit the air on March 5, 1993, on low power station W276AQ (103.1 FM) with DJs Lee Martin (morning and afternoon drive), Matthew Borzi (mid-days) and Larry Hopper (Evenings). The station was owned by Gerry Turro. Gerry Turro was the chief engineer of WNEW (1130 AM) New York City from the 1980s until 1992. That station also had a big band/adult standards format from 1981 to 1992. Jerry purchased WNEW's music library at the end of 1992 for use on Jukebox Radio.

Jukebox Radio's music was originally a blend of traditional adult standards and big bands from the 1930s, 1940s and early 1950s. Core artists originally included Frank Sinatra, Tommy Dorsey, Mills Brothers, Peggy Lee, Ella Fitzgerald, Louis Armstrong, Andrews Sisters, Artie Shaw, Bing Crosby, Duke Ellington, and others. The station, initially, only played a handful of songs newer than 1955 and sounded similar to the 1981 version of WNEW.

In 1994, more easy listening artists such as Nat King Cole, Tony Bennett, Ray Charles, Lettermen, Perry Como, Jerry Vale, pre-1970 Barbra Streisand, and others were added and Jukebox began playing more of the 1960s non rock songs but no baby boomer pop just yet. Jukebox Radio was commercial free originally but each hour was underwritten by various sponsors. In 1995, WJUX was able to become a commercial station when buying commercial license 99.7 FM in Monticello, New York, which was nearly 100 miles (160 km) away, becoming WJUX. W276AQ in Bergen County became a translator station for WJUX. What was unusual was that the station's studios and offices and announcers were all based in Bergen County. The station transmitted from the 103.1 frequency and sent the signal through fiber optic cable to WJUX in Monticello which rebroadcast the signal to the north-western section of The Hudson Valley. At this point, Jukebox Radio became a commercial station.

In 1995, Jukebox Radio began mixing in baby boomer pop artists like Elvis Presley, Beatles, Neil Diamond, Carpenters, James Taylor, and others. Initially the songs were softer and heard a few times an hour. By 1996, more soft AC artists as well as oldies artists from the 1950s and 1960s were mixed in. This included Elton John, Four Tops, Chicago, Billy Joel, Temptations, Stevie Wonder, and others. The station had cut out Big Bands altogether and began cutting back on standards artists as well. The station was about half standards, and half oldies and soft AC gold. In 1997, most standards artists and songs were dropped and the station shifted to oldies from 1955 to about 1989. The station remained an oldies outlet throughout 1998 and 1999.

In June 2000, with an announcement several weeks before, Jukebox Radio flipped back to adult standards from oldies. This standards format would focus on the Sinatra type artists but would also mix in a lot of softer songs by rock and roll oldies artists and some soft AC cuts. The station was about half baby boomer pop and half traditional standards. The station played few big bands at this point. The station would stay with this format until its sale in 2004.

In 2002, WVNJ lost its legal battle and later appealed to have Jukebox Radio taken off the air. Gerry Turro decided that Jukebox Radio would be worth more if it were sold. The translator was eventually sold for $2.2 million.

== Current programming ==
Bridge FM broadcasts a wide variety of programming including Contemporary Rhythmic Praise and Worship Music, preaching and teaching, brief Christian features, instructional Christian programming, Church services, and Children's programs. Programs include Somebody Loves You with Raul Ries, A New Beginning with Greg Laurie, The Word for Today with Chuck Smith, In Touch with Charles Stanley, among other programs.

== Simulcasts ==
Call sign	Frequency	City of license	State	Facility ID	Class	ERP W	Height m (ft)	Transmitter coordinates
WJUX	99.7 FM	South Fallsburg	New York	43653	A	1,400	208 m (682 ft)	41°48′4.20″N 74°47′3.50″W
WPLJ-HD3	95.5 FM–HD3	New York City	New York	73887	B	6,700	408 m (1,339 ft)	40.748°N 73.986°W

=== Translators ===
Call sign	Frequency (MHz)	City of license	State	Facility ID	Class	ERP (W)	Height (m (ft))	Transmitter coordinates	Rebroadcasts
W276AQ	103.1	Fort Lee	New Jersey	46437	D	35	133 m (436 ft)	40°51′15.4″N 73°58′58.5″W	WRDR
W220AA	91.9	Parlin, Etc.	New Jersey	40054	D	10	87 m (285 ft)	40°27′19.4″N 74°17′42.5″W	WRDR
W236CH	95.1	Fort Greene	New York	139395	D	27	268 m (879 ft)	40°45′9.2″N 73°58′4.5″W	WRDR
W295BK	106.9	Poughkeepsie	New York	155824	D	7	215.8 m (708 ft)	41°41′58.3″N 74°0′9.5″W	WJUX
