= Pure Electric Honey =

Studio album by Ant-Bee
- Released: 1990
- Recorded: 1989
- Genre: Psychedelic rock, psychedelic pop, musique concrète
- Length: 36:44
- Label: VOXX
- Producer: Billy James, Scott Kolden

Ant-Bee chronology
Pure Electric Honey (1990)	With My Favorite "Vegetables" & Other Bizarre Muzik (1994)

Pure Electric Honey is the debut studio album by Ant-Bee, released in 1990 by VOXX Records.

== Release ==
Originally, the album was made available only on vinyl. In 2005, it was remastered and released on CD for the first time, accompanied by the 1988 Through the Window Pain demo. Pure Electric Honey, along with Ant-Bee's other works, is currently issued under and can be purchased through Barking Moondog Records' online store.

== Track listing ==
All tracks are written by Ant-Bee.

Side one
No.	Title	Length
1.	"Intro"	0:11
2.	"Eating Chocolate Cake (In the Bath)"	2:37
3.	"My Cat"	4:53
4.	"Black & White Cat, Black & White Cake"	3:49
5.	"Silly Fat Fingers"	2:58
6.	"The Wrong at Once (Has Gone)"	3:52

Side two
No.	Title	Length
1.	"Say Ahhh!"	0:55
2.	"The Green Gin"	4:34
3.	"Evolution #7" (Parts I-IV)	11:45
4.	"Outro"	1:06

CD bonus tracks
No.	Title	Length
11.	"Pre-Cake"	1:18
12.	"Eating Chocolate Cake in the Bath"	3:13
13.	"Silent Mantroid Volume 1"	3:32
14.	"Silent Mantroid Volume 2"	2:11
15.	"Post-Cake"	0:18

== Personnel ==
Adapted from Pure Electric Honey liner notes.

- Billy James (as The Ant-Bee) – vocals, drums, percussion, tablas, guitar, keyboards, tape, production, illustration

Musicians

- Timmy Cannon (as Ymmit) – bagpipes
- Charlotte (as Fuzzy Martin) – backwards violin
- Bob & Thana Harris (as Rantin' & Ravin') – rantin' & ravin'
- Roy Herman (as Herman Monster) – electric guitar, acoustic guitar, slide guitar, beast guitars
- Scott Kolden (as Nedlok Tocs) – guitar, production, engineering

Musicians (cont.)

- Greg Lamastro (as Mr. Green Beans) – sitar
- Jeff Marden (as Om Shanti) – flute
- Rod Martin (as Mod Martin) – slide guitar
- Todd Rogers (as The Spiral Staircase) – keyboards
- Rick Snyder (as Purple Plastic Penguin) – bass guitar
- Jeff Wolfe (as The Colonel) – harmonica
- Gouda & the Potato: meows

== Release history ==
Region	Date	Label	Format	Catalog
United States	1990	VOXX	LP	VXS 200.056
United States	2005	Barking Moondog	CD	
