= Jukebox Radio =

Radio station in New Jersey (1993–2004)

Coordinates: 40.406988°N 74.318416°W

Jukebox Radio was a network of FM radio stations based in Dumont, New Jersey from 1993 to 2003 with the callsign W276AQ on 103.1 FM. In addition, "Jukebox radio" was heard on a full–power class A FM station, WJUX-FM 99.7 from Monticello, New York from 1995 until 2004. These two stations simulcast during that time period. In addition, 94.3 FM also simulcast Jukebox Radio from Rockland County, New York from 1996 to 2003. "Jukebox Radio" originally played Traditional Big Band Music in 1993, then evolved to more of an adult standards format by 1995. "Jukebox Radio" changed to oldies in 1997, then switched back to Adult Standards, but emphasizing more baby boomer pop in 2000. Due to legal issues, Jukebox Radio was forced to sell the stations in 2002. Today, a Christian teaching/preaching/praise & worship music format called "The Bridge" (WRDR) occupies the frequencies.

== History ==
The station was owned by Gerry Turro. It was licensed as a non-commercial station, and Turro designed an unorthodox arrangement to run multiple stations under the "Jukebox Radio" brand. The complex setup led to a protracted legal battle between Turro and the FCC, which was resolved in 2000 and deemed an acceptable use.

The station hit the air on March 5, 1993 on FM translator 103.1 FM with DJs Lee Martin (morning and afternoon drive), Matthew Borzi (mid-days) and Larry Hopper (evenings). Gerry Turro was the chief engineer of 1130 WNEW New York City from the 1980s until 1992 when WNEW folded. That station also had a big band/adult standards format from 1981 to 1992. Gerry purchased WNEW's music library at the end of 1992 for use on Jukebox Radio.

Jukebox radio's music was originally a blend of traditional adult standards and big bands from the 1930s, 1940s and early 1950s. Core artists originally included Frank Sinatra, Tommy Dorsey, Mills Brothers, Peggy Lee, Ella Fitzgerald, Louis Armstrong, Andrews Sisters, Artie Shaw, Bing Crosby, Duke Ellington, and others. The station, initially, only played a handful of songs newer than 1955 and sounded similar to the 1981 version of 1130 WNEW.

In 1994, more easy listening artists such as Nat King Cole, Tony Bennett, Ray Charles, The Lettermen, Perry Como, Jerry Vale, pre-1970 Barbra Streisand, and others were added and Jukebox began playing more of the 1960s non rock songs but no baby boomer pop, except for a couple Ray Charles and Connie Francis songs, just yet. Jukebox Radio was non-commercial originally, each hour was underwritten by various sponsors. In 1995, WJUX was able to become a commercial station when leasing commercial airtime on 99.7 FM in Monticello, New York, which was nearly 100 miles away, becoming WJUX-FM. FM translator W276AQ, Fort Lee 103.1 in Bergen County became a translator station for WJUX. But what was unusual was that the station's studios and offices and announcers were all based in Bergen County. The station transmitted from the 103.1 frequency and sent the signal through digital phone circuits to WJUX-FM in Monticello which rebroadcast the signal to the north-western section of The Hudson Valley. At this point, Jukebox Radio became a commercial station.

In the middle of 1995, Jukebox Radio began adding baby boomer pop to the format, playing about 4 or 5 per hour. Artists like Neil Diamond, Kenny Rogers, Dionne Warwick, Elvis Presley, Barry Manilow, Neil Sedaka, Brenda Lee, soft Beatles songs, Tony Orlando, Everly Brothers, and others. The station still continued to emphasise the Sinatra type artists and continued to feature some big band music as well.

=== Legal challenge ===
Miriam Warshaw and her husband Howard, owners of AM stand-alone station 1160 WVNJ filed a lawsuit in federal court claiming that Jukebox Radio's signal was illegal because the low power station was run as the main station while the full power station was a translator. Also since the signals had little if any overlap. WJUX 99.7 Monticello was receiving the signal from the Jukebox Radio studios through phone lines. The suit also claimed that 99.7 was designated to serve the Northwestern Hudson Valley and the southern Catskills and not Bergen County, but all its programming aimed at Bergen County and most of its advertisers were based out of Bergen County. WVNJ had an R&B oldies format at the time WJUX went commercial in 1995, but switched to Adult Standards early in 1996 due to low ratings. Also, WJUX had an advantage being on FM, taking potential advertisers away from WVNJ.

Jukebox Radio won the first round of proceedings, but WVNJ appealed the decision to the Federal appellate court. WVNJ lost their appeal.

=== Format ===
Over the years, people such as Chuck Leonard, Jimmy Howes, Marty Wilson, Max Kinkel, Lee Arnold, Matthew Borzi, Peter Vann, Bill Owen, Stan Martin, Mike Egan, Nick Straka, Bob Bober Harlin Jeffries, Bobby Ryan, and John Paul Morris, Dennis Aase, and Steve Hards worked at the Jukebox. John's weeknight program was broadcast live from 7 P.M. to 1:00 A.M. and a taped replay of each program was re-run until 6:00 A.M. In terms of selling advertising, Jukebox was very successful, doing over 1 million a year in billing. The oldies format did fairly well for the station. Chuck Leonard is now in the Radio Hall of Fame and was the first African American DJ breaking the color barrier in New York City, working at 77-WABC Radio 1965-1979.

Local News on Jukebox Radio was delivered by Mike Prelee (WNEW/1130) and David Matthau (son of Walter Matthau).

Throughout 1997, Jukebox Radio began emphasising more baby boomer pop music. Big Band artists like Tommy Dorsey and old time crooners like Bing Crosby were gone. Artists like Frank Sinatra, The Lettermen, and Johnny Mathis would remain but now shared substantial airtime with songs by more baby boomer artists like Dion, Fats Domino, James Taylor, Paul Anka, Commodores, Kenny Loggins, The Association, Motown artists, and many others. By 1998 classic rockers like The Rolling Stones, The Doors, Billy Joel, Doobie Brothers and others were mixed in. Most of the pop standards staples were eliminated. Also, more Motown artists like Stevie Wonder, Four Tops, The Miracles, The Supremes, The Temptations, and others were added. By the spring of 1998, Jukebox Radio was a broad based oldies outlet focusing on the music of 1964 to 1979 with a sprinkling of big hits from the 1980s and the 1955-1963 era.

In 2000, however, it was decided that Jukebox Radio would go back to adult standards but more of a hybrid of oldies and easy listening (sort of an MOR format...the way AC stations sounded in 1976). They would be more contemporary than their archrival WVNJ (which by then was not selling much advertising and now experiencing financial problems), but softer than an oldies station. Core artists included Sinatra, Bennett, Elvis, Neil Diamond, Simon & Garfunkel, The Lettermen, Tom Jones, Carly Simon, Andy Williams, and many others.

=== Legal conclusion ===
Due to the excessive legal fees forced upon Jukebox Radio, financial problems also began to occur. A compromise was reached that the station could stay on the air until it was sold to a non-commercial broadcaster. Since non-commercial broadcasters have more lenient rules regarding translators, such a broadcaster could continue to run the license. As a result, Jukebox Radio was forced to sell the facilities to a non-commercial broadcaster due to these lawsuits and being buried with debt. In the last year, the station cut music time down to about 6 hours a day. The rest of the time was filled by infomercials. The station on 99.7 and the 103.1 translator was sold to a religious broadcaster. In November 2004, Jukebox Radio signed off for the last time and a religious format consisting of Praise & Worship Music, Christian Charismatic Preaching, Teaching, and features replaced Jukebox Radio. The station is known as "The Bridge" today.
