= Weasels Ripped My Flesh =

Studio album with live elements by The Mothers of Invention
- Released: August 10, 1970
- Recorded: December 1967 – August 1969 at various locations
- Genres: Jazz fusion; avant-rock; progressive rock; free jazz
- Length: 39:48
- Labels: Bizarre, Reprise
- Producer: Frank Zappa

Frank Zappa chronology
Burnt Weeny Sandwich (1970)	Weasels Ripped My Flesh (1970)	Chunga's Revenge (1970)

The Mothers of Invention chronology
Burnt Weeny Sandwich (1970)	Weasels Ripped My Flesh (1970)	Fillmore East – June 1971 (1971)

Alternative covers
- German cover

2 Originals of the Mothers of Invention

Professional ratings
Review scores
Source	Rating
AllMusic	4.5/5 stars
Christgau's Record Guide	B+

Weasels Ripped My Flesh is the eighth album by the American rock group the Mothers of Invention, and the tenth overall by Frank Zappa, released in 1970. Following the Mothers' late 1969 split, Zappa assembled two albums – Burnt Weeny Sandwich and Weasels Ripped My Flesh – from unreleased studio and live recordings by the band, as well as some tracks recorded during the sessions for his 1969 solo album Hot Rats. While Burnt Weeny Sandwich focuses mostly on studio recordings and tightly arranged compositions, Weasels Ripped My Flesh focuses mostly on live recordings and loose/improvisational pieces.

== Album information ==
Whereas all but one of the pieces on Burnt Weeny Sandwich have a more planned feel captured by quality studio equipment, five tracks from Weasels Ripped My Flesh capture the Mothers on stage, where they employ frenetic and chaotic improvisation characteristic of avant-garde jazz and free jazz. This is particularly evident on "The Eric Dolphy Memorial Barbecue", a tribute to the multi-instrumentalist Eric Dolphy who died in 1964 and is cited as a musical influence in the liner notes to the band's Freak Out! album. The song opens with a complex melody over a 3/4 rhythm, breaking into howls and laughter at the three-minute mark, then the theme is repeated and elaborated; after a brief rave-up section, the number concludes in stop-start fashion. This song is a feature of the annual Dolphy Day celebration at Le Moyne College, New York.

Zappa's classical influences are reflected in characteristically satirical fashion on "Prelude to the Afternoon of a Sexually Aroused Gas Mask", a play on Claude Debussy's Prélude à l'après-midi d'un faune (Prelude to the Afternoon of a Faun). "Oh No" is a vocal version of a theme that originally appeared on Zappa's Lumpy Gravy album, as well as a pointed barb aimed at the Beatles' "All You Need Is Love". "The Orange County Lumber Truck" incorporates the "Riddler's Theme" from the Batman TV show. The album's closer and title track consists of every player on stage producing as much noise and feedback as they can for about one and a half minutes. An audience member is heard yelling for more at its conclusion. The All-Music Guide concludes that the track is "perfectly logical in the album's context."

In contrast to the experimental tracks, the album also contains a straightforward interpretation of Little Richard's R&B single "Directly From My Heart to You", featuring violin and lead vocal from Don "Sugarcane" Harris. The first part of the jazz instrumental "Toads of the Short Forrest" was earlier titled "Arabesque". Both of these tracks were recorded during the sessions for Zappa's solo album Hot Rats and appear here under the Mothers name even though Zappa broke up the group at about the time these recordings were made.

The album also documents the brief tenure of Lowell George (guitar and vocals), who went on to found the band Little Feat with Mothers bassist Roy Estrada. On "Didja Get Any Onya?", George affects a German accent to relate a story of being a small boy in Germany and seeing "a lot of people stand around on the corners asking questions, 'Why are you standing on the corner, acting the way you act, looking the way you look, why do you look that way?'"

The Rykodisc CD reissue of the album features different versions of "Didja Get Any Onya?" and "Prelude to the Afternoon of a Sexually Aroused Gas Mask", which featured music edited out of the LP versions. The extended version of "Didja Get Any Onya?" features a live performance of the composition "Charles Ives", a studio recording of which had previously been released as the backing track for "The Blimp" on the Captain Beefheart album Trout Mask Replica, produced by Frank Zappa. The 2012 Universal Music reissue reverts to the original LP versions.

== Album cover ==
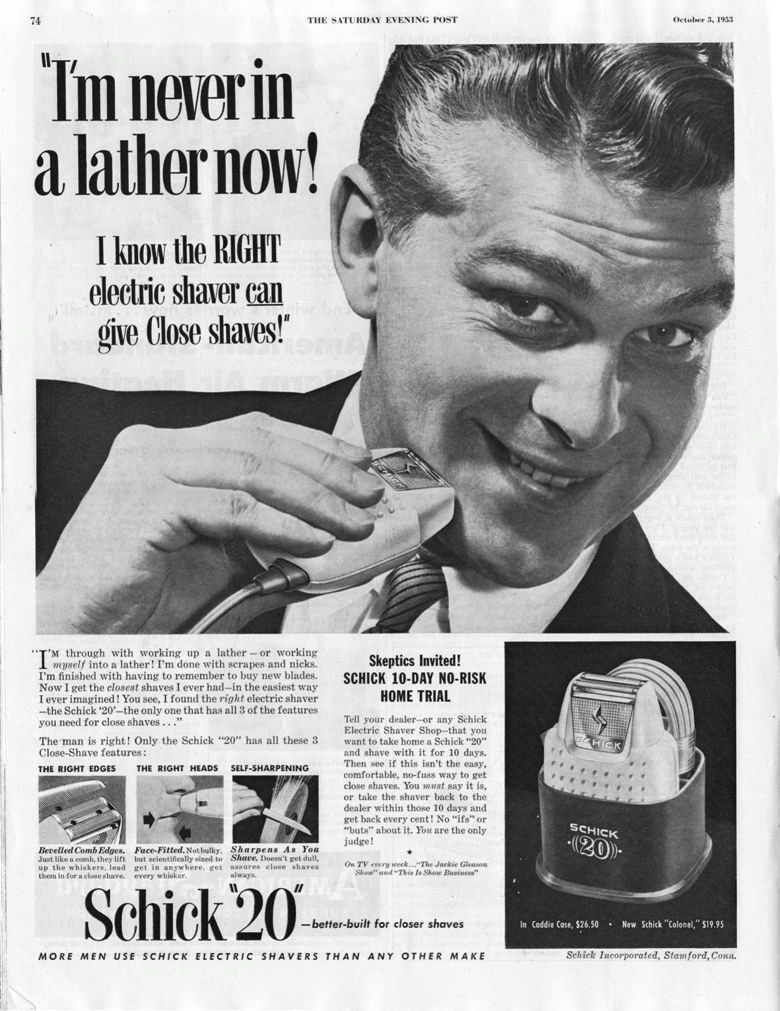
The two images that inspired the cover art by Neon Park: the September 1956 cover to Man's Life magazine (left) and a 1953 Schick electric shaver ad (right).

Frank Zappa recruited artist Neon Park to create a subversive image based on a cover story from the September 1956 issue of Man's Life, a men's adventure magazine. The magazine's cover story depicts a shirtless man being attacked by numerous weasels, above the caption "Weasels Ripped My Flesh". After showing Neon a copy of the magazine, Zappa inquired, "This is it. What can you do that's worse than this?" Neon's answer was to craft a parody of an advertisement for Schick brand electric razor based on the "Weasels Ripped My Flesh" theme. The record company released the album despite its reservations about the album cover.

German releases of the album featured a cover showing a metal baby caught in a rat trap. This cover was not approved by Zappa.

In 1975, Burnt Weeny Sandwich and Weasels Ripped My Flesh were reissued together as 2 Originals of the Mothers of Invention, with the original covers used as the left and right sides of the inner spread, and the outer gatefold cover depicting a revolver shooting toothpaste onto a toothbrush.

== Reception ==
Contemporary reviews of the record called it "far-out" (Billboard, August 29, 1970) and a "random collection of editing room snippets recorded at the Mothers' concerts" (Rolling Stone, October 1, 1970). Now placed in its historical context, modern reviewers tend to appreciate it more favorably. A typical example of such appreciation is Christgau's Record Guide (from 1981), which grades the album a B+. In a retrospective review, AllMusic gave it 4.5 stars out of 5, calling it a "fascinating collection", and stating that "Zappa's anything-goes approach and the distance between his extremes are what make Weasels Ripped My Flesh ultimately invigorating". In his book Viva Zappa!, Dominique Chevalier wrote that the album is "one of Zappa's most aggressively bizarre works, full of cross-references to free jazz and modern classical musicians such as Luciano Berio". He also said that the best piece was undoubtedly "Eric Dolphy Memorial Barbecue", calling it "the cleverest tribute that could have been paid to him".

== Track listing ==
All tracks are written by Frank Zappa except "Directly from My Heart to You" by Richard Wayne Penniman.

Side one
No.	Title	Recorded	Length
1.	"Didja Get Any Onya?"	March 2, 1969, Philadelphia Arena, Philadelphia	3:44
2.	"Directly from My Heart to You"	July 1969, TTG Recording Studios, Hollywood	5:17
3.	"Prelude to the Afternoon of a Sexually Aroused Gas Mask"	October 25, 1968, Royal Festival Hall, London	3:35
4.	"Toads of the Short Forest"	August 1969, Whitney Studios, Glendale and February 7–8, 1969, Thee Image, Miami	4:48
5.	"Get a Little"	February 13, 1969, The Factory, The Bronx	2:35
Total length:			20:41

Side two
No.	Title	Recorded	Length
6.	"The Eric Dolphy Memorial Barbecue" (instrumental)	June 1969, A&R Studios, New York City	6:53
7.	"Dwarf Nebula Processional March & Dwarf Nebula" (instrumental)	December 1967-February 1968, Apostolic Studios, New York City	2:12
8.	"My Guitar Wants to Kill Your Mama"	February 1969, Criteria Studios, Miami and August–September 1969, T.T.G. Studios, Hollywood	3:35
9.	"Oh No"	December 1967-February 1968, Apostolic Studios, New York City	1:46
10.	"The Orange County Lumber Truck" (instrumental)	October 25, 1968, Royal Festival Hall, London	3:18
11.	"Weasels Ripped My Flesh"	May 30, 1969, Town Hall, Birmingham	2:05
Total length:			20:37

== Personnel ==
=== Players ===
- Frank Zappa – lead guitar, vocals on "My Guitar Wants to Kill Your Mama"
- Ian Underwood – alto saxophone
- Bunk Gardner – tenor saxophone
- Motorhead Sherwood – baritone saxophone and snorks
- Buzz Gardner – trumpet and flugel horn
- Roy Estrada – bass, vocals on "Prelude to the Afternoon of a Sexually Aroused Gas Mask"
- Jimmy Carl Black – drums
- Art Tripp – drums
- Don Preston – piano, organ and electronic effects
- Ray Collins – vocals on "Oh No"
- Don "Sugarcane" Harris – electric violin, vocals on "Directly from My Heart to You"
- Lowell George – rhythm guitar, vocals on "Didja Get Any Onya?"

=== Production ===
- Frank Zappa – producer (also credited for text & direction on 2012 CD)
- Herb Cohen – Bizarre business (credited on original LP only)
- Neon Park – cover art
- Bob Stone – digital art (remastering, 1989)
- John Williams – photography, art direction (credited from 1990 onwards)
- Christian Rose – tray photo (1995 and 2012 CDs)
- Joe Travers – vaultmeisterment and analog transfers, March 2012
- Bob Ludwig – mastering, 2012

== Charts ==
Album – Billboard (United States)

Year	Chart	Position
1970	Billboard 200	189
