= Jimmy Carl Black =

American drummer and vocalist (1938–2008)

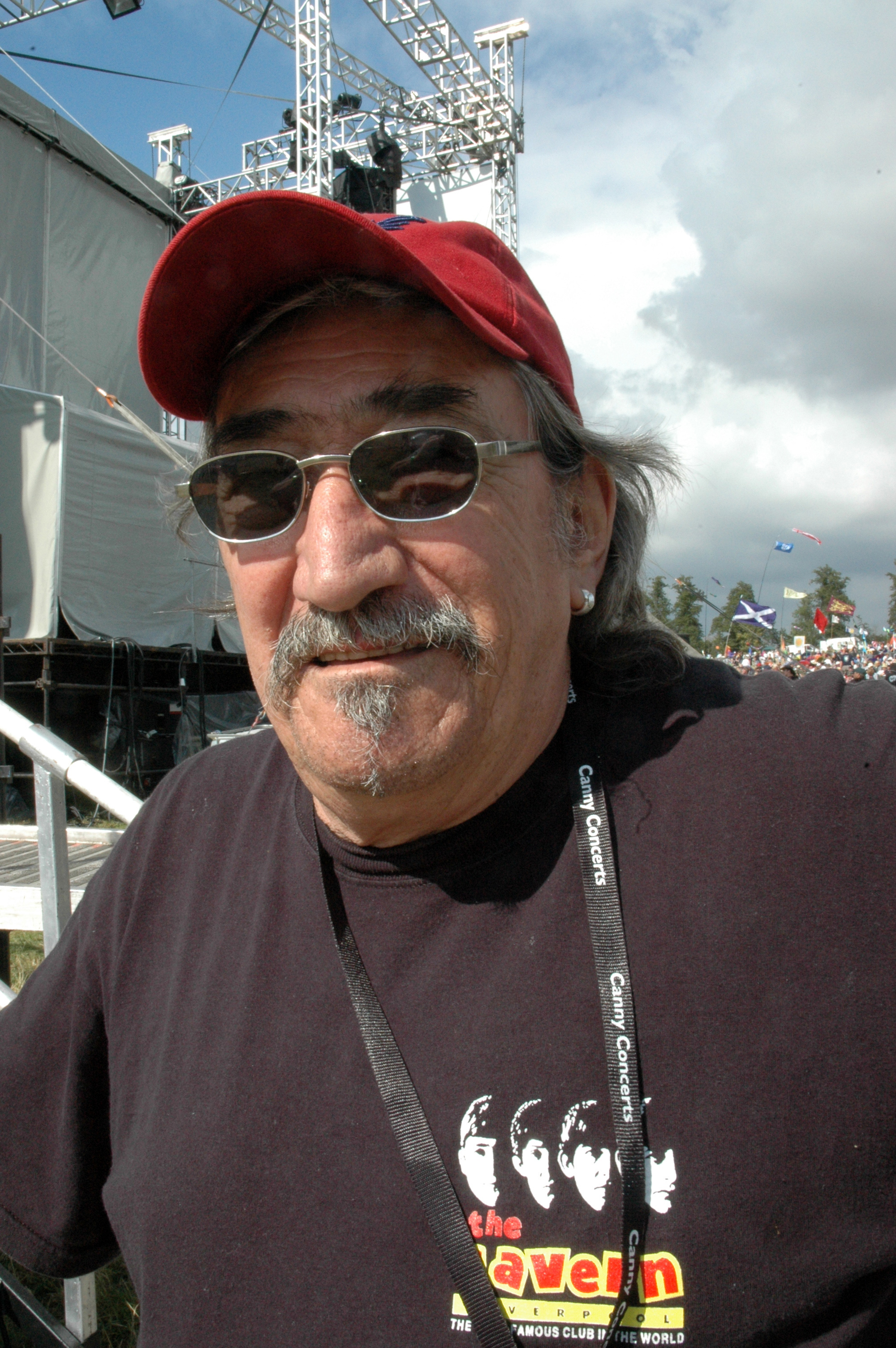
- Black in 2005

Background information
- Also known as: Indian Ink; The Indian of the Group
- Born: James Inkanish Jr. February 1, 1938; El Paso, Texas, U.S.
- Died: November 1, 2008 (aged 70) Siegsdorf, Germany
- Genres: Rock; rhythm and blues
- Occupations: Musician; songwriter; record producer
- Instruments: Drums; percussion; vocals
- Years active: Late 1950s – 2008

James Inkanish, Jr. (February 1, 1938 – November 1, 2008), known professionally as Jimmy Carl Black, was an original member of the Mothers of Invention, providing drums and vocals. He is known for introducing the songs "Are You Hung Up?" and "Concentration Moon" from the Mothers' album We're Only in It for the Money (1968) saying "Hi boys and girls, I'm Jimmy Carl Black and I'm the Indian of the group."

== Background and early career: 1960s–1990s ==
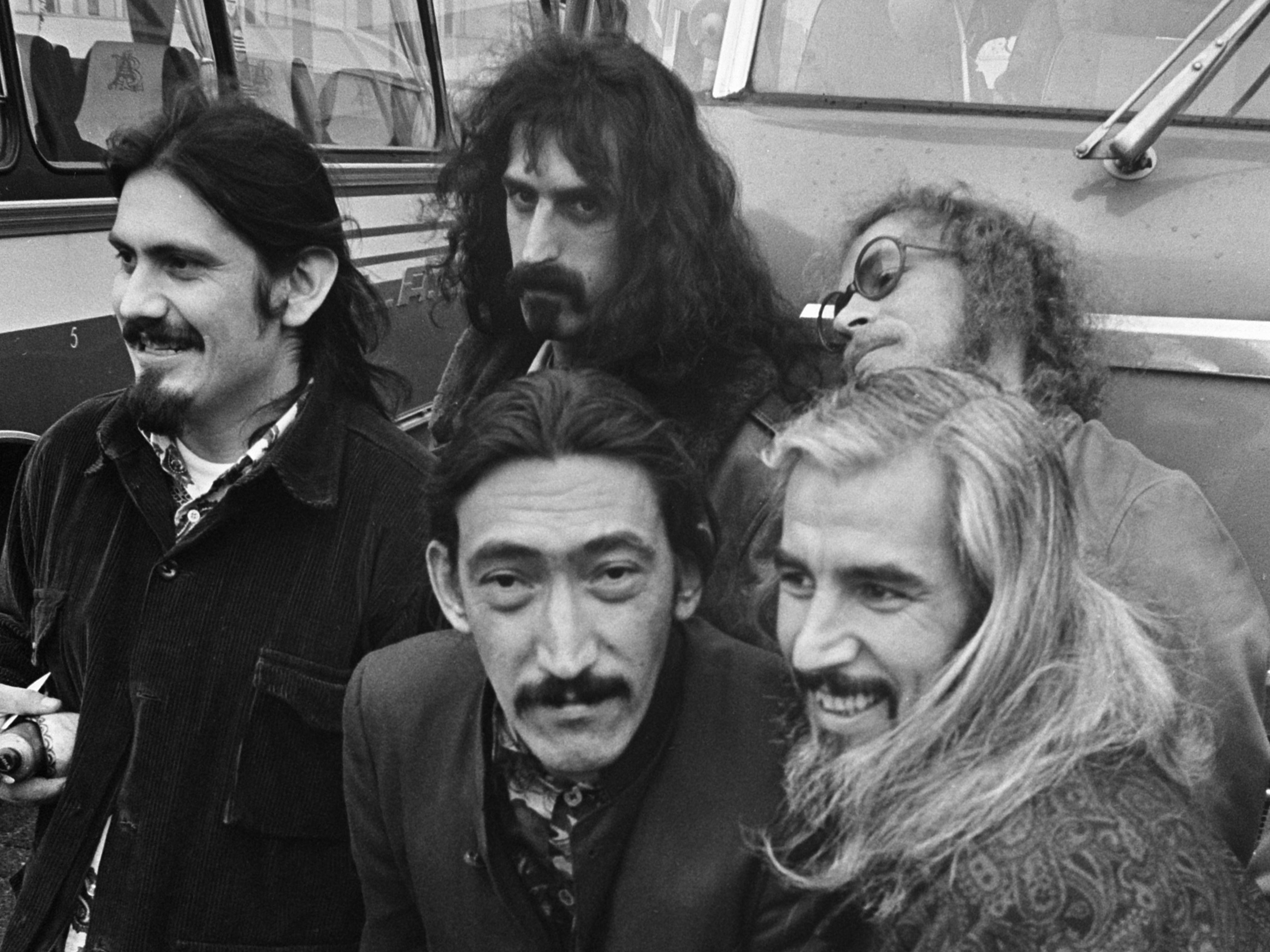
Jimmy Carl Black (front row) with Frank Zappa & The Mothers of Invention (1968)

Born in El Paso, Texas, Black was Cheyenne; both his father James Inkanish Sr. and his mother Jennie Inkanish (née Dorris) were citizens of the Cheyenne and Arapaho Tribes. His trademark line was "Hi boys and girls, I'm Jimmy Carl Black, and I'm the Indian of the group." The line can be heard several times on The Mothers of Invention's album We're Only in It for the Money (for example, on the tracks "Are You Hung Up?" and "Concentration Moon"). The line can also be heard in Haskell Wexler's 1969 movie Medium Cool, which uses several songs by Zappa and the Mothers. Black was also addressed as such by Theodore Bikel in the film 200 Motels. He is credited on some Mothers albums with "drums, vocals, and poverty".

Black appeared in the movie directed by Frank Zappa, 200 Motels, and sings the song "Lonesome Cowboy Burt". Black made a few more appearances with Zappa in 1975 and 1980, and appeared as guest vocalist on "Harder Than Your Husband" on the Zappa album You Are What You Is (1981). Also in 1981, he performed the same song at the discothèque Aladdin, Oasen, Bergen, Norway, as part of The Grandmothers, after their release Grandmothers (1980), an anthology of previously unreleased recordings by ex-members of The Mothers of Invention.

Jimmy Carl Black on Frank Zappa:

I would have told him that I appreciated his friendship through the years and that I had learned a lot from him. I really loved Frank like you do a brother.

In 1972, Black played with Geronimo Black, the band he founded with Mothers wind player Bunk Gardner. In the summer of 1975 he played drums for Captain Beefheart & the Magic Band under the stage name Indian Ink, notably at the band's appearance at the Knebworth Festival.

In the eighties, Black, Gardner, Don Preston, and several other ex-Zappa musicians performed under the name The Grandmothers, but the band soon broke up. Black then moved to Austin, Texas, where he met English singer Arthur Brown. The duo recorded an album of classic R&B songs, Black, Brown and Blue, and performed live together.

Black moved to Italy in 1992 and to Germany in 1995, where he re-formed The Grandmothers with original members Preston and Gardner and with Dutch bass player Ener Bladezipper (stage name of René Mesritz) and Italian guitar player Sandro Oliva.

== 1990s–2008 ==
Black performed as a guest vocalist with the Muffin Men, a Frank Zappa tribute band based in Liverpool, England, and with Jon Larsen, on the surrealistic Strange News From Mars project, featuring several other Zappa alumni, such as Tommy Mars, Bruce Fowler, and Arthur Barrow. Black toured Europe with the Muffin Men between 1993 and 2007 playing hundreds of gigs, and appearing on many of the band's CDs and DVDs.

Black and Eugene Chadbourne played as the Jack and Jim Show around Europe and the US between 1992 and 2003. They performed many Zappa and Beefheart compositions alongside other material. At Steely Dan's 2001 Rock and Roll Hall of Fame induction, Walter Becker asked the assembled if they remembered who the original Mothers of Invention drummer was. Becker unsuccessfully lobbied the Rock and Roll Hall of Fame for Black's inclusion as a founding member of The Mothers of Invention. An autobiographical audio production with Jimmy Carl Black was recorded in 2007, called The Jimmy Carl Black Story, produced by Jon Larsen.

Black was diagnosed with lung cancer in August 2008, and died on November 1, 2008, in Siegsdorf, Germany, at the age of 70. Benefits were held on November 9, 2008, at the Bridgehouse II in London and December 7, 2008, in Crown Valley, California. He is survived by his wife, Monika Black, by three sons and two daughters from his first marriage and by a daughter born out of wedlock. In 2013, the documentary Where's the Beer and When Do We Get Paid? about Black began running in Germany.

Black's autobiography For Mother's Sake was published by Monika Black on November 1, 2013, to mark the fifth anniversary of his death. The incomplete manuscript was rounded out using material from the synoptic web-bio Black published on his website, and extracts from various interviews Black gave. The main body of text was transcribed from tapes recorded by Roddie Gilliard in the Muffin Men tour bus during 1995-1998.

== Band chronology ==
- Them 3 Guys (1959–60)
- The Keys (1960–62)
- The Squires (1963–64)
- Soul Giants (1964–65)
- The Mothers of Invention (with Frank Zappa, 1965–69)
- Geronimo Black (1969–70, 1971–73)
- Mesilla Valley Lo boys (1974–77), Captain Beefheart & the Magic Band (1975)
- Big Sonny & The Lo Boys (1977–79)
- The Grandmothers (1980–82)
- Captain Glasspack & his Magic Mufflers (1982–83)
- Pound for Pound, Junior Franklin & The Golden Echoes, Rhythm Rats (1983–85)
- Jimmy Carl Black and the Mannish Boys (1985–88)
- (Austin) Grandmothers (1988–92)
- The Jack & Jim Show (with Eugene Chadbourne, 1993–95, 2001–08)
- Grandmothers (1993-94, 1998, 2000)
- The Farrell and Black Band (1995–2006)
- Muffin Men (1993, 1995–2008)
- Sandro Oliva & the Blue Pampurio's, X-Tra Combo, Behind The Mirror, Boogie Stuff, Cosmik Debris, Mick Pini Band, Jimmy Carl Black Band, Tempest Quartet, Happy Metal Band, etc. (1996–2008)

== Discography ==
=== Solo ===
- Albuquerque Bound b/w Thank You, Mr. Bill (1980) 45 on Helios Records
- Clearly Classic (1981)
- A Lil' Dab'l Do Ya (1987) − as Jimmy Carl Black & Mannish Boys
- Brown, Black & Blue (1988) − as Arthur Brown and Jimmy Carl Black
- When Do We Get Paid? (1998)
- Drummin' the Blues (2001)
- Is Singin' the Blues (2002)
- Hamburger Midnight (2002) − as BEP (Jimmy Carl Black, Roy Estrada and Mike Pini)
- Mercedes Benz (2003) − as Jimmy Carl Black & the X-Tra Combo
- Indian Rock Songs from Jimmy Carl Black (2005) − live album
- How Blue Can You Get? (2006)
- Where's the $%&#@ Beer? (2008)
- I Just Got in from Texas (2008) − as Chris Holzhaus, Jimmy Carl Black & Louis Terrazas
- Can I Borrow a Couple of Bucks Until the end of the Week? (2008)
- I'm Not Living Very Extravagantly, I'll Tell You for Sure... (2008)
- Where's My Waitress? (2008)
- If We'd All Been Living in California... (2008)
- Freedom Jazz Dance (2008) – as Jimmy Carl Black, Valentina Black, Bruno Marini, Daniele D'Agaro, Cristina Mazza
- Black/Brown/Stone (2009) − as Jimmy Carl Black, Steven De Bruyn & Jos Steen
- Live All-Stars (2009) − live album − as Jimmy Carl Black & the Route 66 All-Star Blues Band
- More Rockin' Blues (2009) − as Jimmy Carl Black & the Route 66 All-Star Blues Band
- Live in Steinbach (2009) − live album − as Jimmy Carl Black, Mick Pini & Uwe Jesdinsky

=== The Mothers of Invention ===
- Freak Out! (1966)
- Absolutely Free (1967)
- We're Only in It for the Money (1967)
- Cruising with Ruben & the Jets (1968)
- Uncle Meat (1969)
- Mothermania (1969) − compilation
- Burnt Weeny Sandwich (1969)
- Weasels Ripped My Flesh (1970)
- Ahead of Their Time (1993)

=== Frank Zappa ===
- Lumpy Gravy (1967)
- 200 Motels (1971)
- Confidential (1974) − live album
- Remington Electric Razor (1980) − live album
- You Are What You Is (1981)
- The Supplement Tape (1990) − compilation
- Tis the Season to Be Jelly (1991) − live album
- The Ark (1991) − live album
- Our Man in Nirvana (1992) − live album
- Electric Aunt Jemima (1992) − live album
- Lost Episodes (1996) − compilation
- Cheap Thrills (1998) − compilation

=== Others ===
- Permanent Damage (The GTOs, 1969)
- Geronimo Black (Geronimo Black, 1972)
- Grandmothers (The Grandmothers, 1980) – an anthology of previously unreleased recordings by ex-members of The Mothers of Invention (Rhino Records)
- In Heat (Big Sonny and the Lo Boys, 1979)
- Welcome Back (Geronimo Black, 1980)
- The Highway Cafe of the Damned (Austin Lounge Lizards, 1988)
- Locked in a Dutch Coffeeshop (Eugene Chadbourne, 1993)
- Dreams on Long Play (The Grandmothers, 1993)
- With My Favorite "Vegetables" & Other Bizarre Muzik (Ant-Bee, 1994)
- Vile Foamy Ectoplasm (Don Preston, 1994)
- Who Could Imagine? (The Grandmothers, 1994)
- Who The F**k Is Sandro Oliva??!? (Sandro Oliva, 1994)
- A Mother of an Anthology (The Grandmothers, 1995)
- Pachuco Cadaver (Eugene Chadbourne, 1995)
- Jesse Helms Busted with Pornography (Eugene Chadbourne, 1996)
- Uncle Jimmy's Master Plan (Eugene Chadbourne, 1996)
- Chadbourne Barber Shop (Eugene Chadbourne, 1996)
- Frankincense: The Muffin Men Play Frank Zappa (the Muffin Men, 1998)
- Lunar Muzik (Ant-Bee, 1998)
- Eating the Astoria (The Grandmothers, 2000)
- Communication Is Overrated (Eugene Chadbourne, 2000)
- 2001: A Spaced Odyssey (Eugene Chadbourne, 2001)
- The Taste of the Leftovers (Eugene Chadbourne, 2001)
- The Perfect C&W Duo's Tribute to Jesse Helms (Eugene Chadbourne, 2001)
- The Early Years (Eugene Chadbourne, 2001)
- The Jack & Jim Show- 2001: A Spaced Odyssey (Eugene Chadbourne, 2001)
- The Eternal Question (The Grandmothers, 2001)
- Roland Kirk Memorial Barbecue (Blind Riders on Mad Horses, 2004)
- The First Album (Ella Guru, 2004) (sings on the last two tracks)
- Heavy Lightining (Sandro Oliva, 2005)
- Strange News From Mars (Jon Larsen, 2007)
- The Jimmy Carl Black Story (Jon Larsen, 2008)
- People with Purpose (Wizards of Twiddly, 2010)
- Electronic Church Muzik (Ant-Bee, 2011)
