= Burnt Weeny Sandwich =

Studio album with live elements by The Mothers of Invention
- Released: February 9, 1970
- Recorded: August 1967 – July 1969
- Genre: Jazz fusion
- Length: 41:27
- Label: Bizarre/Reprise
- Producer: Frank Zappa

Frank Zappa chronology
Hot Rats (1969)	Burnt Weeny Sandwich (1970)	Weasels Ripped My Flesh (1970)

The Mothers of Invention chronology
Uncle Meat (1969)	Burnt Weeny Sandwich (1970)	Weasels Ripped My Flesh (1970)

Singles from Burnt Weeny Sandwich
- 1. "WPLJ" Released: February 1970

2 Originals of the Mothers of Invention

Professional ratings
Review scores
Source	Rating
AllMusic	4.5/5 stars
The Rolling Stone Album Guide	4/5 stars

Burnt Weeny Sandwich, released in 1970, is the seventh album by the American rock band the Mothers of Invention, and the ninth overall by Frank Zappa. It consists of both studio and live recordings.

The LP included a large triple-folded black and white poster saying "The Mothers of Invention Sincerely Regret to Inform You" under multiple images of the band.

== Title ==
The album's unusual title, Zappa would later say in an interview, comes from an actual snack that he enjoyed eating, consisting of a burnt Hebrew National hot dog in a sandwich with mustard.

In 1975, Burnt Weeny Sandwich and Weasels Ripped My Flesh were reissued together as 2 Originals of the Mothers of Invention, with the original covers used as the left and right sides of the inner spread, and the outer gatefold cover depicting a revolver shooting toothpaste onto a toothbrush.

== Album information ==
The album was essentially a 'posthumous' Mothers release, having been issued after Frank Zappa dissolved the original band.

Ian Underwood's contributions are significant here. Like its 1970 counterpart Weasels Ripped My Flesh, this album comprises tracks from the Mothers vault that were not previously released. Whereas Weasels mostly showcases the Mothers in a live setting, much of Burnt Weeny Sandwich features studio work and structured Zappa compositions.

The guitar solo portion of the "Theme from Burnt Weeny Sandwich" is an outtake from an unused extended version of "Lonely Little Girl" from the 1967 sessions for the We're Only in It for the Money LP. Zappa and Art Tripp later added multiple percussion overdubs for the released version (The source recordings for the percussion overdubs were issued in 2012 on the posthumous Zappa release Finer Moments under the title "Enigmas 1–5").

"Igor's Boogie", which appears in two parts or "phases", is a reference to a major Zappa influence, composer Igor Stravinsky.

On side two, the centerpiece of the album, "Little House I Used to Live In" is a composite of several distinct sections recorded in different locations. It employs compound meters such as 11/8 with overlaid melodies in 6/8 and 4/4. The ending of this song features an organ solo played by Zappa with the band at Whitney Studios in Glendale, California. This is immediately followed by Zappa speaking to the audience at a concert in London, England, and gives the impression that the entire ending section is a live recording.

Cal Schenkel has noted that his unique cover art for Burnt Weeny Sandwich was originally commissioned for the cover of an Eric Dolphy release.

The piano introduction of "Little House I Used to Live in" appears in Yvar Mikhashoff's four CD set "Yvar Mikhashoff's Panorama of American Piano Music".

== Track listing ==
All tracks are written by Frank Zappa except where noted.

Side one
No.	Title	Length
1.	"WPLJ" (Ray Dobard, Luther McDaniel)	3:02
2.	"Igor's Boogie, Phase One"	0:40
3.	"Overture to a Holiday in Berlin"	1:29
4.	"Theme from Burnt Weeny Sandwich"	4:35
5.	"Igor's Boogie, Phase Two"	0:35
6.	"Holiday in Berlin, Full Blown"	6:27
7.	"Aybe Sea"	2:45
Total length:		19:54

Side two
No.	Title	Length
8.	"Little House I Used to Live in"	18:42
9.	"Valarie" (Clarence Lewis, Bobby Robinson)	3:14
Total length:		21:56

== Personnel ==
- Frank Zappa – guitar, organ, vocals
- Jimmy Carl Black – percussion, drums
- Roy Estrada – bass, backing vocals, Pachuco rap on "WPLJ"
- Janet Ferguson – backing vocals on "WPLJ"
- Bunk Gardner – woodwinds
- Buzz Gardner – trumpet
- Billy Mundi – drums (uncredited, left group in December 1967, pictured on gatefold cover and possibly played on "Theme from Burnt Weeny Sandwich")
- Lowell George – guitar, vocals
- Don "Sugarcane" Harris – violin on "Little House I Used to Live In"
- Don Preston – piano, keyboards
- Jim Sherwood – woodwinds
- Art Tripp – drums, percussion
- Ian Underwood – piano, keyboards, woodwinds, saxophones
- John Balkin – bass on "WPLJ", string bass on "Overture to a Holiday in Berlin"

=== Production ===
- Producer: Frank Zappa
- Engineer: Dick Kunc
- Arranger: Frank Zappa
- Design: John Williams
- Cover art: Cal Schenkel
- CD package design: Ferenc Dobronyl
- CD art adaptation: Cal Schenkel

== Charts ==
Album - Billboard (United States)

Year	Chart	Position
1970	Billboard 200	94
