= Buzz Gardner =

American trumpet and flugelhorn player

Charles "Buzz" Guarnera (March 23, 1930 – February 1, 2004) was an American trumpet and flugelhorn player. Under the name Buzz Gardner, he was a member of the original version of Frank Zappa's band the Mothers of Invention during the 1960s alongside his brother Bunk Gardner.

== Early life and education ==
Born March 23, 1930 in Cleveland, Ohio, Guarnera started playing music at a very young age. He was influenced into Big Band and jazz music. At the age of 16, Guarnera started his music career touring with Midwest and Jack Wilson. By then moved to New York City, study at Mannes School of Music. By 1951 he served in the military being based in Trieste, Italy. He played in a military band with which included flautist Herbie Mann. Along the way he shared a room with Don Preston who later played with him in Frank Zappa and The Mothers of Invention. In 1953 Guarnera called it quits and left the military service, and moved to Paris, France. While in Paris he played with René Thomas and André Hodeir, recording a couple of albums with them. In 1955 Gardner moved back to New York to study at the Manhattan School of Music. By 1959 he graduated from Manhattan School of Music with a BA degree in music. After graduating from Manhattan School of Music, he moved to Los Angeles and played with his brother Bunk. The brothers played in Latin and jazz groups together.

== Career ==
In 1962 Buzz met up with Don Preston again, playing in Don Preston's Unnamed Experimental Project. By 1968, Buzz changed his style of genre playing in avant-garde/jazz fusion music background. In November 1968 Buzz joined Frank Zappa's band the Mothers of Invention playing the trumpet, also reuniting with his brother Bunk. Buzz only appeared in two of the Mothers of Invention's albums, Burnt Weeny Sandwich and Weasels Ripped My Flesh. In August 1969, Zappa disbanded the Mothers. Buzz and Bunk went to play with John Balkin, performing as Menage A Trois from 1969 to 1972.

The brothers appeared on Tim Buckley's 1970 Starsailor and Domenic Troiano's 1972 self-titled debut album. In 1980, Buzz reunited with some of the Mothers of Invention group members, with Bunk, Jimmy Carl Black, Jim Sherwood, and Don Preston. The group was called the Grandmothers. The group recorded a few albums and reunited in 2002.

Buzz died on February 1, 2004, at the age of 73.

== Discography ==
- René Thomas quintet: rené thomas et son quintette 1954
- Bobby Jaspar: bobby jaspar's new jazz vol.2 1954
- Andre Hodeir et le jazz groupe de paris: essais 1955

=== With Frank Zappa and the Mothers of Invention ===
- Uncle Meat (1969)
- Burnt Weeny Sandwich (1970)
- Weasels Ripped My Flesh (1970)
- You Can't Do That On Stage Anymore Sampler (1988)
- You Can't Do That On Stage Anymore Vol. 1 (1988)
- You Can't Do That On Stage Anymore Vol. 4 (1991)
- You Can't Do That On Stage Anymore Vol. 5 (1992)
- BTB I: The Ark (1991)
- BTB II: Our Man In Nirvana (1992)

=== With Captain Beefheart & his Magic Band ===
- Trout Mask Replica (1969)

=== Geronimo Black ===
- Geronimo Black (1972)

=== Tim Buckley ===
- Starsailor (1970)

=== Domenic Troiano ===
- Domenic Troiano (1972)

=== with Grandmothers ===
- The Grandmothers (1981)
- Fan Club Talk (1981)
- Lookin Up Granny's Dress (1983)
- A Mother of Anthology (1993)

=== with Ant-Bee ===
- Electronic Church Muzik (2011)
