= Denny Walley =

American guitarist (born 1943)

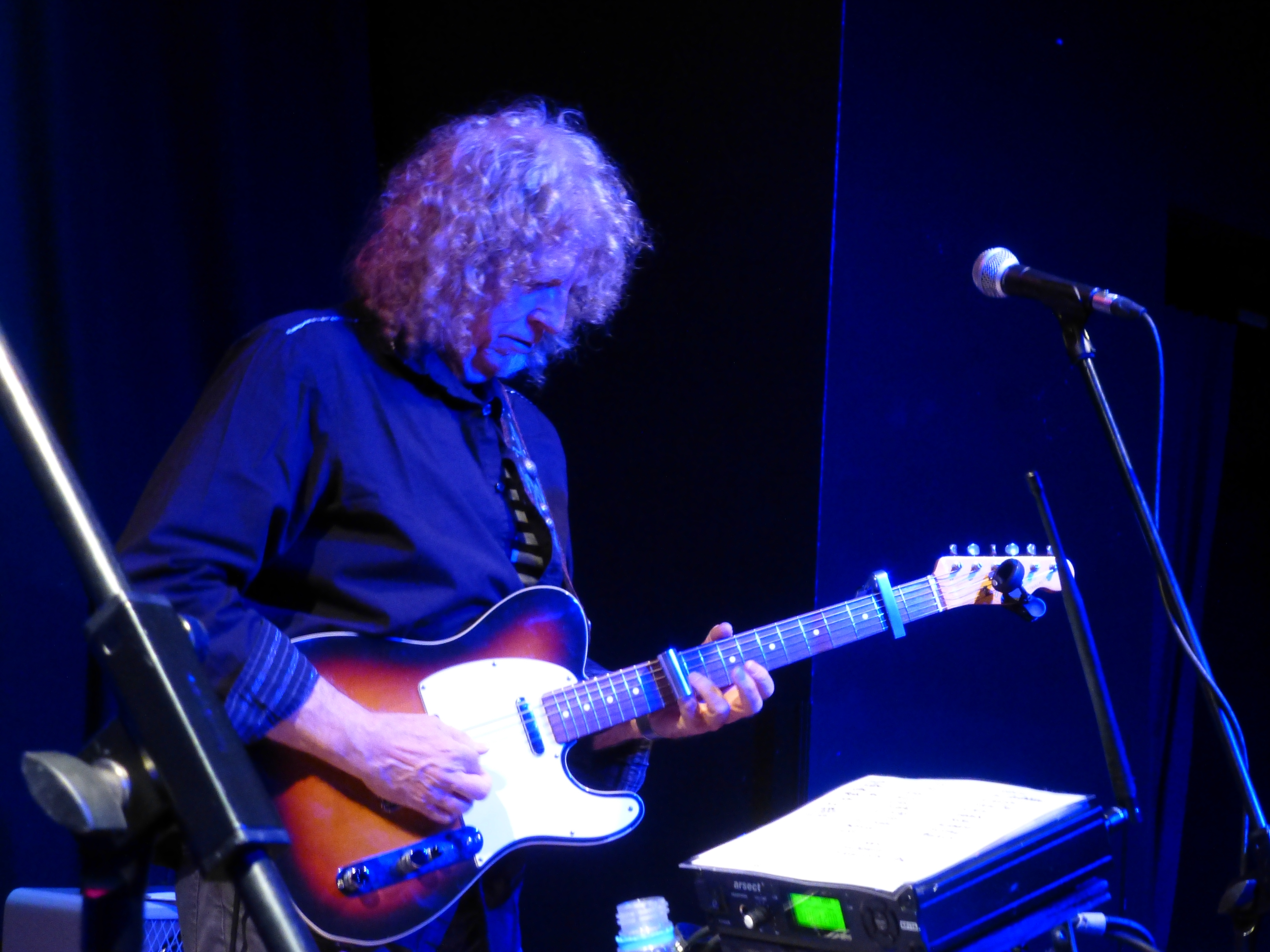
Denny Walley AKA Feelers Rebo on stage with The Magic Band at Band On The Wall in Manchester 29/5/2014

Denny Walley (born February 4, 1943) is an American guitarist. He is known for working with Frank Zappa in the 1970s and '80s.

== Career ==
Walley was born in Pennsylvania. He spent much of his childhood in New York City before his family moved to Lancaster, California, in 1955 where he met Frank Zappa.

Denny Walley has played with many bands over the years and is best known for his work with Frank Zappa's Mothers of Invention and Captain Beefheart's Magic Band. He also played briefly with Geronimo Black in 1972.

Captain Beefheart gave him the nickname Feelers Rebo.

From 2003 to 2014, he toured regularly with the reformed Magic Band.

== Recording history ==
=== Frank Zappa ===
Walley played guitar, slide guitar and also provided vocals for the following Frank Zappa albums:

- Bongo Fury
- Joe's Garage Act I
- Joe's Garage Acts II & III
- Tinseltown Rebellion
- Shut Up 'N Play Yer Guitar
- You Are What You Is
- Thing-Fish
- Guitar
- You Can't Do That on Stage Anymore, Vol. 1
- You Can't Do That on Stage Anymore, Vol. 4
- You Can't Do That on Stage Anymore, Vol. 6
- Anyway the Wind Blows
- At The Circus
- Halloween
- Trance-Fusion

=== Captain Beefheart ===
On the original Bat Chain Puller album (recorded in 1976, but released only in 2012 due to legal ownership problems) he played accordion on the track "Harry Irene", as well as guitar and slide guitar on all the tracks.

=== The Magic Band ===
- Back To The Front
- 21st Century Mirror Men
- Performing The Music Of Captain Beefheart - 1: Oxford, U.K. June 6, 2005
- The Magic Band Plays The Music Of Captain Beefheart - Live In London 2013
