= Ant-Bee =

American experimental musician and writer

Billy James
- Also known as: Ant-Bee
- Born: Billy James; November 11, 1960 (age 65); Charlotte, North Carolina, United States
- Died: March 15, 2025
- Genres: Rock, jazz, experimental
- Occupations: Musician, writer, publicist
- Instruments: drums, percussion, vocals
- Years active: 1977–2025

Billy James (November 11, 1960 - March 15, 2025), better known by his stage name Ant-Bee, was an American experimental musician and writer. In his musical work, he focused on a revival of 1960s style psychedelic rock, working with members of The Mothers of Invention; the original members of the Alice Cooper group, and Captain Beefheart's Magic Band.

Founder of Glass Onyon PR, he represented music artists including King Crimson, Jon Anderson, Michael Bruce, Greg Lake, Mitch Mitchell, John Wetton, and others. As a recording artist with the name ANT-BEE, he was a multi-instrumentalist who has recorded and performed with musicians including members of the original Alice Cooper group Michael Bruce, Dennis Dunaway, and Neal Smith; the original Mothers of Invention; Bruce Cameron, and others; and produced his four solo albums.

As a writer, he has co-authored and authored biographies of musicians including Michael Bruce, Todd Rundgren, and others.

In the 1990s James performed and recorded with musicians including Michael Bruce, whose autobiography James co-authored, "No More Mr Nice Guy: The Inside Story of the Alice Cooper Group", first published in 1996.

== Producer ==
Billy James helped to gather together an array of guest artists on the album Midnight Daydream from Bruce Cameron.

He died of pancreatic cancer.

== Author ==
James' rock biographies, such as the book Lunar Notes - Zoot Horn Rollo's Captain Beefheart Experience written with Bill Harkleroad (Zoot Horn Rollo) have been reprinted after being out of print for years by GONZO MultiMedia UK.

== Other ==
Interviews with Billy are featured in the DVD documentaries From Straight To Bizarre - Zappa, Beefheart, Alice Cooper and LA's Lunatic Fringe and Frank Zappa and the Mothers of Invention - In The 1960s.

== Discography ==
- Pure Electric Honey (1990)
- With My Favorite "Vegetables" & Other Bizarre Muzik (1994)
- Lunar Muzik (1997)
- Electronic Church Muzik (2011)
