= Bunk Gardner =

American musician (born 1933)

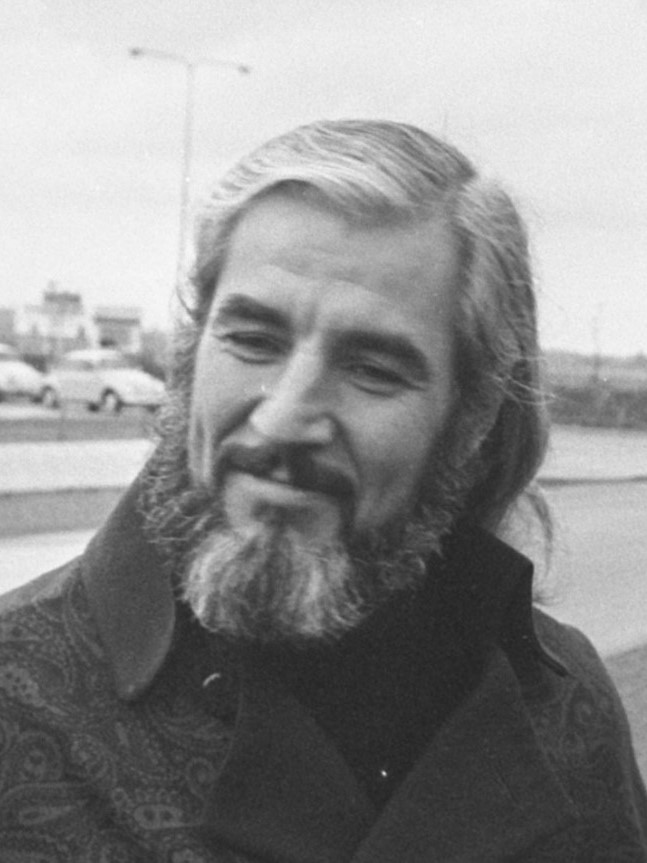
- Gardner in Amsterdam Airport Schiphol, The Netherlands, c. October 1968
- Born: John Leon Guarnera; May 2, 1933 (age 93); Cleveland, Ohio, U.S.
- Occupations: Multi-instrumentalist; performance artist

Bunk Gardner (born John Leon Guarnera; May 2, 1933 in Cleveland, Ohio) is an American musician who most notably played for the original version of Frank Zappa's Mothers of Invention until the group disbanded in 1969. He plays woodwinds and tenor sax. His older brother, Buzz, was also in the Mothers of Invention.

== Career ==
Gardner joined the Cleveland Philharmonic as a bassoonist in 1950. Bunk played on his first record in 1954, playing sax and flute on a record covering popular Western tv show themes, released by Roulette Records. He moved to California in 1960 and met Jimmy Carl Black. Bunk recorded and toured with Eartha Kitt, Tim Buckley, Little Richard and Van Morrison. Gardner joined The Mothers of Invention in November 1966 as a woodwinds player for three years until 1969 and played on four albums: We're Only in It for the Money (1968), Lumpy Gravy (1968), Cruising With Ruben & The Jets (1968), and Uncle Meat (1969); he is also credited on the albums Burnt Weeny Sandwich (1970) and Weasels Ripped My Flesh (1970), which were released after he left the band.

When he left the group, he and his brother formed Menage A Trois with John Balkin. From 2003 to 2009, Gardner was a member of the Los Feliz Woodwind Ensemble with founder Kalman Bloch and Michele Zukovsky. He and former Mothers of Invention member Don Preston toured as the duo The Don and Bunk Show from 2001 until at least 2014, playing music by the Mothers of Invention with the intention of wanting fans "to come and hear how Zappa's music was performed by the originals".

== Personal life ==
Gardner was born John Leon Guarnera in Cleveland, Ohio to Charles and Thelma Guarnera. His father changed the family's surname to "Gardner". His older brother, Charles Guarnera (Buzz Gardner) played in a big band. Bunk started playing piano at age seven, taking lessons from Elmira Snodgrass for 50 cents a lesson. Gardner then learned how to play the sax at age twelve. Gardner met his wife Bonnie in 1968 and married in 1977; the couple have two daughters. Gardner previously battled Prostate cancer.

== Discography ==
=== With Frank Zappa and the Mothers of Invention ===
- Absolutely Free (1967)
- We're Only in It for the Money (1968)
- Lumpy Gravy (1968)
- Cruising With Ruben & The Jets (1968)
- Uncle Meat (1969)
- Burnt Weeny Sandwich (1970)
- Weasels Ripped My Flesh (1970)
- Electric Aunt Jemima (1986)
- You Can't Do That on Stage Anymore, Vol. 1 (1988)
- You Can't Do That on Stage Anymore, Vol. 4 (1991)
- The Ark (1991)
- You Can't Do That on Stage Anymore, Vol. 5 (1992)
- Our Man in Nirvana (1992)
- Ahead of Their Time (1993)
- Mystery Disc (1998)
- Finer Moments (2012)
- Road Tapes, Venue 1 (2012)

=== With The Grandmothers ===
- The Grandmothers (1981)
- Fan Club Talk (1981)
- Lookin Up Granny's Dress (1983)
- A Mother of Anthology (1993)
- Who Could Imagine? (1994)
- Eating The Astoria (2000)

=== With Geronimo Black ===
- Geronimo Black – Uni – 1972
- Welcome Back Geronimo Black – Helios – 1980.

=== Bunk Gardner solo releases ===
- It's All Bunk – Crossfire Productions 2007
- The Bunk Gardner Story – part one - Zonic Entertainment 2011
- The Bunk Gardner Story – part two - Zonic Entertainment 2011
