= The Mothers 1971 =

Box set by Frank Zappa
- Released: March 18, 2022
- Recorded: June 1 – December 10, 1971
- Genre: Experimental rock; Hard rock; Progressive rock; Jazz fusion
- Length: 592:27 (8CD); 94:03 (Rainbow Theatre 3LP)
- Label: Zappa
- Producer: Ahmet Zappa; Joe Travers

Frank Zappa chronology
Zappa '88: The Last U.S. Show (2021)	The Mothers 1971 (2022)	Zappa/Erie (2022)

The Mothers 1971 is a box set by Frank Zappa, released posthumously on March 18, 2022. It is a compilation of live music mainly consisting of several shows recorded at the Fillmore East which were originally intended for album Fillmore East – June 1971, including an encore with guest musicians John Lennon and Yoko Ono, which had been previously released on the CD Playground Psychotics. The box set also includes a 'hybrid show' recorded in Harrisburg and Scranton, Pennsylvania, on June 3, and June 1, respectively, as well as a homemade radio spot, a single version of the song "Tears Began To Fall" (along with its B-Side), and lastly, a recording from the Rainbow Theatre in London, England, on December 10. This would be the final show the band would play in 1971, as it concluded with Frank Zappa being pushed off the stage by an audience member, causing life-altering injuries, a months-long hiatus from performing live, and thus putting an end to the tour and this era of Zappa's career.

== Track listing ==
CD 1: Fillmore East, New York City, NY, June 5, 1971 - Show 1
No.	Title	Length
1.	"Peaches En Regalia"	4:18
2.	"Tears Began To Fall"	2:45
3.	"Shove It Right In"	7:28
4.	"Status Back Baby"	2:28
5.	"Concentration Moon, Pt. 1"	1:26
6.	"The Sanzini Brothers (Sodomy Trick)"	1:30
7.	"Concentration Moon, Pt. 2"	2:11
8.	"Mom & Dad"	4:12
9.	"Intro To Music For Low Budget Orchestra"	1:38
10.	"Billy the Mountain"	30:28
11.	"King Kong"	20:37
Total length:		79:00

CD2: Fillmore East, New York City, NY, June 5, 1971 - Show 2
No.	Title	Length
1.	"Peaches En Regalia"	4:32
2.	"Tears Began To Fall"	2:47
3.	"Shove It Right In"	7:18
4.	"Intro To Music For Low Budget Orchestra"	1:41
5.	"Billy the Mountain"	34:41
6.	"Little House I Used To Live In"	4:43
7.	"The Mud Shark"	3:22
8.	"What Kind Of Girl Do You Think We Are?"	5:04
9.	"Bwana Dik"	1:58
10.	"Latex Solar Beef"	4:23
11.	"Willie the Pimp"	3:45
Total length:		74:13

CD 3: Fillmore East, New York City, NY, June 5, 1971 - Show 2 (cont'd)
No.	Title	Length
1.	"Do You Like My New Car?"	7:46
2.	"Happy Together"	3:21
3.	""Any Chord Of Your Choice""	1:44
4.	"King Kong, Pt. 1"	4:22
5.	"Lonesome Electric Turkey"	2:34
6.	"King Kong, Pt. 2"	19:37

Fillmore East, New York City, NY, June 6, 1971 - Show 1
No.	Title	Length
7.	"Filmore Improvisation"	3:38
8.	"Peaches en Regalia"	3:31
9.	"Tears Began To Fall"	2:50
10.	"Shove It Right In"	9:26
11.	"Status Back Baby"	2:34
12.	"Concentration Moon, Pt. 1"	1:29
13.	"The Sanzini Brothers (Sodomy Trick)"	1:37
14.	"Concentration Moon, Pt. 2"	2:17
15.	"Mom & Dad"	3:59
Total length:		70:44

CD 4: Fillmore East, New York City, NY, June 6, 1971 - Show 1 (cont'd)
No.	Title	Length
1.	"The Story of Billy the Mountain"	3:43
2.	"Intro To Music For Low Budget Orchestra"	1:39
3.	"Billy the Mountain"	35:59
4.	"Chunga's Revenge"	14:07

Fillmore East, New York City, NY, June 6, 1971 - Show 2
No.	Title	Length
5.	""Herd Of Cattle""	2:10
6.	"Peaches En Regalia"	3:42
7.	"Tears Began To Fall"	2:41
8.	"Shove It Right In"	6:47
Total length:		70:48

CD 5: Fillmore East, New York City, NY, June 6, 1971 - Show 2 (cont'd)
No.	Title	Length
1.	"The Story Of Billy The Mountain"	2:54
2.	"Intro To Music For Low Budget Orchestra"	1:38
3.	"Billy the Mountain"	33:10
4.	""Conglomerate Assembly""	1:13
5.	"Little House I Used To Live In"	4:50
6.	"The Mud Shark"	5:12
7.	"What Kind Of Girl Do You Think We Are?"	4:41
8.	"Bwana Dik"	1:55
9.	"Latex Solar Beef"	3:57
10.	"Willie the Pimp"	4:22
11.	"Do You Like My New Car?"	7:04
12.	"Happy Together"	3:42
Total length:		74:39

CD 6: Fillmore East, New York City, NY, June 6, 1971 - Show 2 (cont'd) - John & Yoko Encore Set
No.	Title	Length
1.	"Well"	9:03
2.	"Say Please"	1:31
3.	"King Kong"	1:09
4.	"Aaawk"	3:10
5.	"Scumbag"	5:52
6.	"A Small Eternity With Yoko Ono"	6:28

Radio Spot, Single Version, B-Side & Outtakes
No.	Title	Length
7.	"Homemade Radio Spot"	2:17
8.	"Tears Began To Fall - Single Version"	2:49
9.	"Junier Mintz Boogie - Single B-Side"	2:54
10.	"Homemade Radio Spot Outtakes"	6:35

Bonus Hybrid Concert: Harrisburg/Scranton, PA 1971 State Farm Show Arena, Harrisburg, PA, June 3, 1971 (tracks 11–20)
No.	Title	Length
11.	"Peaches en Regalia"	3:45
12.	"Tears Began To Fall"	2:46
13.	"Shove It Right In"	7:34
14.	"Status Back Baby"	2:27
15.	"Concentration Moon, Pt. 1"	1:27
16.	"The Sanzini Brothers (Burning Hoop Trick)"	2:28
17.	"Concentration Moon, Pt. 2"	2:11
18.	"Mom & Dad"	2:14
19.	"My Boyfriend's Back"	1:25
20.	"Tiny Sick Tears"	1:12
Total length:		70:19

CD 7: Bonus Hybrid Concert: Harrisburg/Scranton, PA 1971 State Farm Show Arena, Harrisburg, PA, June 3, 1971 (tracks 1–3, parts of track 4), Watres Armory, Scranton, PA, June 1, 1971 (parts of track 4, tracks 5–6)
No.	Title	Length
1.	"Call Any Vegetable"	8:32
2.	"The Story Of Billy The Mountain"	1:14
3.	"Intro To Music For Low Budget Orchestra"	1:30
4.	"Billy the Mountain"	36:31
5.	"Willie the Pimp"	9:40
6.	"King Kong (Outro)"	1:19

Rainbow Theatre, London, England, December 10, 1971
No.	Title	Length
7.	"Zanti Serenade"	12:39
8.	"Peaches en Regalia"	3:20
9.	"Tears Began To Fall"	2:40
Total length:		77:25

CD 8: Rainbow Theatre, London, England, December 10, 1971 (cont'd)
No.	Title	Length
1.	"Shove It Right In"	6:54
2.	""Pain In The Ass""	2:25
3.	"Divan: Once Upon A Time"	4:36
4.	"Divan: Sofa #1"	2:56
5.	"Pound For A Brown, Pt. 1"	5:40
6.	"Super Grease"	3:01
7.	"Pound For A Brown, Pt. 2"	7:50
8.	"Sleeping In A Jar"	2:24
9.	"Wonderful Wino"	4:51
10.	"Sharleena"	4:38
11.	"Cruising For Burgers"	3:39
12.	""That's Your Tough Luck""	2:08
13.	"King Kong"	21:44
14.	"I Want to Hold Your Hand"	2:32
Total length:		75:19

=== Rainbow Theatre (3LP) ===
Side A
No.	Title	Length
1.	"Zanti Serenade"	12:39
2.	"Peaches en Regalia"	3:20
3.	"Tears Began To Fall"	2:41
Total length:		18:40

Side B
No.	Title	Length
1.	"Shove It Right In"	6:55
2.	""Pain In The Ass""	2:25
3.	"Divan: Once Upon A Time"	4:36
4.	"Divan: Sofa #1"	2:56
Total length:		16:52

Side C
No.	Title	Length
1.	"Pound For A Brown, Pt. 1"	5:40
2.	"Super Grease"	3:02
3.	"Pound For A Brown, Pt. 2"	7:50
4.	"Sleeping In A Jar"	2:26
Total length:		18:58

Side D
No.	Title	Length
1.	"Wonderful Wino"	4:51
2.	"Sharleena"	4:38
3.	"Cruising For Burgers"	3:39
Total length:		13:08

Side E
No.	Title	Length
1.	""That's Your Tough Luck""	2:08
2.	"King Kong - Part I"	11:42
Total length:		13:50

Side F
No.	Title	Length
1.	"King Kong - Part II"	10:02
2.	"I Want to Hold Your Hand"	2:33
Total length:		12:35

== Personnel ==
=== Musicians ===
- Frank Zappa – guitar, vocals
- Ian Underwood – winds, keyboards
- Aynsley Dunbar – drums
- Jim Pons – bass, vocals, dialogue
- Bob Harris – keyboards, vocals
- Howard Kaylan (AKA Eddie) – vocals, dialogue
- Mark Volman (AKA Flo) – vocals, dialogue
- John Lennon – guitar, vocals
- Yoko Ono – vocals

== Charts ==
Chart performance for The Mothers 1971
Chart (2023)	Peak position
Belgian Albums (Ultratop Flanders)	139
Belgian Albums (Ultratop Wallonia)	65
Dutch Albums (Album Top 100)	67
German Albums (Offizielle Top 100)	18
Swiss Albums (Schweizer Hitparade)	41
