= Fillmore East – June 1971 =

Live album by The Mothers
- Released: August 2, 1971
- Recorded: June 5–6, 1971
- Venue: Fillmore East (New York City)
- Genres: Comedy rock; jazz rock
- Length: 44:17
- Label: Bizarre/Reprise
- Producer: Frank Zappa

Frank Zappa chronology
Chunga's Revenge (1970)	Fillmore East – June 1971 (1971)	200 Motels (1971)

The Mothers of Invention chronology
Weasels Ripped My Flesh (1970)	Fillmore East – June 1971 (1971)	Just Another Band from L.A. (1972)

Fillmore East – June 1971 is a live album by The Mothers, released in 1971. It is the twelfth album in Frank Zappa's discography, and was produced by Zappa and mixed by Toby Foster.

== History ==
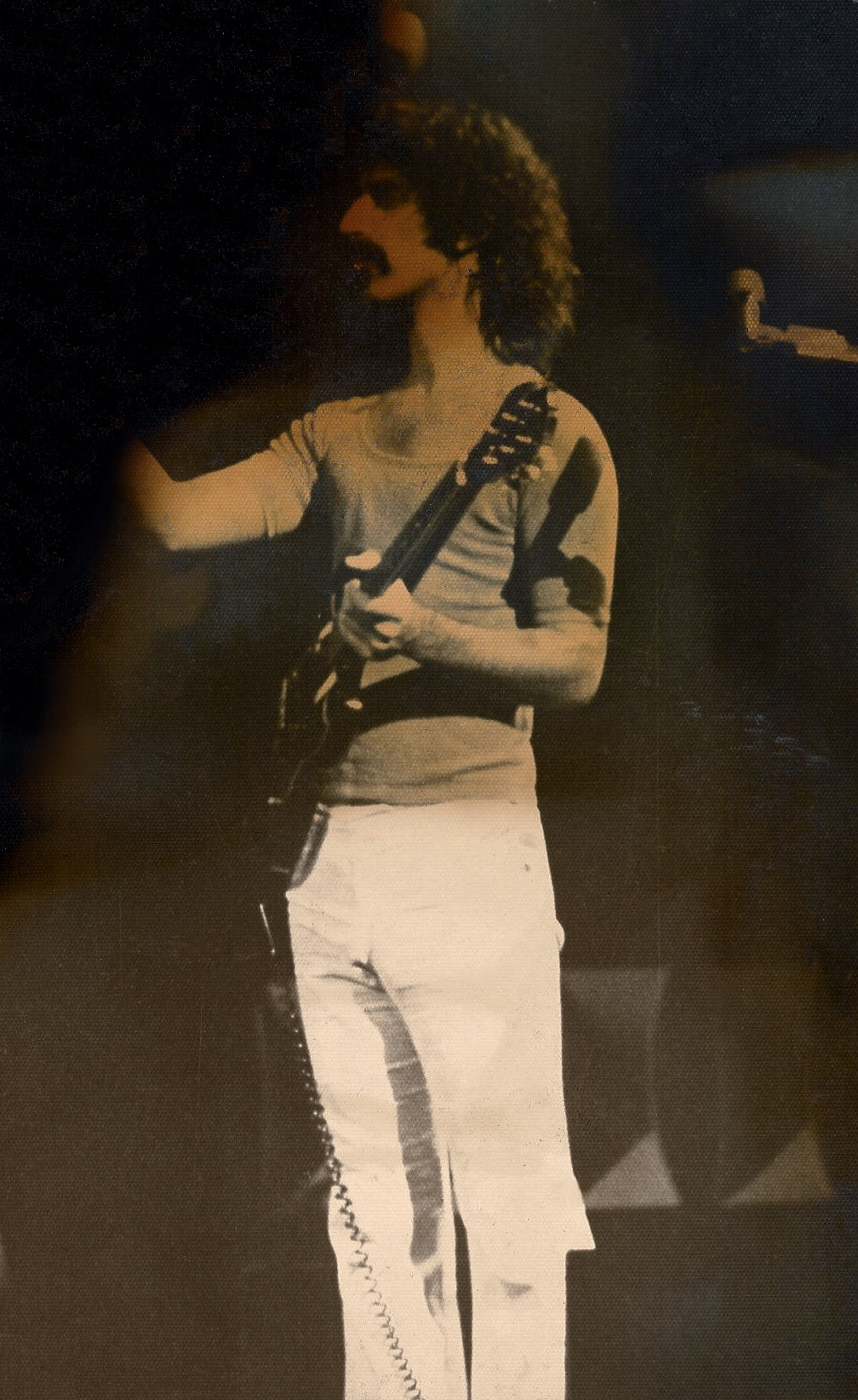
Frank Zappa at the Fillmore East during the album's recording on June 5, 1971

Fillmore East – June 1971 is a live thematic album. It portrays a comedic fantasy life of a rock band on the road as narrated by Frank Zappa, and contains elements that, because of time and budget constraints, couldn't be included in the movie 200 Motels. "The Mud Shark" section is a story about a hotel, Seattle's Edgewater Inn, where guests could fish from their rooms. In the tale, a mud shark is caught by a member of the pop group Vanilla Fudge or its crew and, when combined with a groupie and a movie camera, depravity ensues. The story is related to an infamous 1969 incident involving members of Led Zeppelin and Vanilla Fudge.

The band then portray stereotypically egotistical members of a rock band "negotiating" for sex with a groupie and her girlfriends. The girls are insulted that the band thinks they are groupies and that they would sleep with the band just because they are musicians. They have standards; they will only have sex with a guy in a group with a "big, hit single in the charts – with a bullet!" and a "dick that's a monster." In "Bwana Dik", singer Howard Kaylan assures the girls that he is endowed beyond their "wildest Clearasil-spattered fantasies." And, not to be put off by the standards of these groupies, the band sings the Turtles' hit "Happy Together" - Kaylan, Mark Volman, and Jim Pons having been members of the Turtles - to the girls to give them their "bullet". The album ends with an encore excerpt including both Zappa's familiar "Peaches en Regalia" and a pastiche of early-rock and roll, "Tears Began to Fall" (also issued as a single).

When this album was first reissued on compact disc by Rykodisc, "Willie the Pimp, Pt. 2" was omitted from the track line-up. It was included on the 2012 reissue of the album. Also, in the CD edition, the last minute of "Latex Solar Beef" was placed at the beginning of "Willie the Pimp Part One", making it longer. It is unclear if this was intentional or not.

== John & Yoko and the Mothers ==
Professional ratings
Review scores
Source	Rating
Allmusic	3/5 stars
Christgau's Record Guide	C−
Uncut	6/10
The Village Voice	D+

As an encore on one of the two nights of this Fillmore East appearance John Lennon and Yoko Ono emerged from the wings to play a half hour set with the band. This part of the show was released under Lennon's name on a disc called Live Jam, which was included as a bonus disc with Lennon's album Some Time in New York City. It can also be heard on Zappa's 1992 release Playground Psychotics. It also appears in its complete unedited version, along with the "original" version of "Billy the Mountain", on the expanded triple-LP reissue of Fillmore East and the anniversary set The Mothers 1971, released simultaneously on March 18, 2022.

Lennon used a copy of the cover of the Zappa album (adding his own red-inked credits to the album's black-ink handwritten ones) to provide liner notes for Live Jam.

== Track listing ==
All tracks are written by Frank Zappa, except where noted.

Side one
No.	Title	Length
1.	"Little House I Used to Live In" (June 5)	4:58
2.	"The Mud Shark" (mostly June 6, with intro recorded on June 5)	5:16
3.	"What Kind of Girl Do You Think We Are?" (June 5 & June 6)	4:51
4.	"Bwana Dik" (June 5)	2:27
5.	"Latex Solar Beef" (June 5)	4:22
6.	"Willie the Pimp, Part One" (June 5)	2:50
Total length:		23:33

Side two
No.	Title	Writer(s)	Length
7.	"Willie the Pimp, Part Two" (June 6)		1:54
8.	"Do You Like My New Car?" (June 5 & June 6)		7:08
9.	"Happy Together" (June 6)	Garry Bonner, Alan Gordon	2:57
10.	"Lonesome Electric Turkey (encore excerpt featuring Don Preston on Minimoog)" (June 5)		2:34
11.	"Peaches en Regalia" (June 5, 2nd show)		3:22
12.	"Tears Began to Fall" (June 6, 2nd show)		2:46
Total length:			20:44

On 1990s CD editions, "Willie the Pimp Part Two" was removed. The track was restored on the 2012 CD reissue.

=== Bonus tracks (2022) ===
The following tracks appear on this album's anniversary expanded edition, released on March 18, 2022.

All tracks are written by Frank Zappa, except where noted.

Side three (featuring John Lennon and Yoko Ono; June 6)
No.	Title	Writer(s)	Length
13.	"Well"	Walter Ward	5:29
14.	"Say Please"	Zappa, Lennon, Ono	1:00
15.	"Aaawk"	Zappa, Lennon, Ono	2:59
16.	"Scumbag"	Zappa, Howard Kaylan, Lennon, Ono	5:54
17.	"A Small Eternity With Yoko Ono"	Lennon, Ono	6:10

Side four
No.	Title	Length
18.	"King Kong Solos" (June 5)	18:49

Side five
No.	Title	Length
19.	"Billy the Mountain": "Phase One of 'The Plot'"; "Phase Two & Newscast"; "The Legendary Low Budget Hero"; "The Flies"	19:47

Side six
No.	Title	Writer(s)	Length
20.	"Billy the Mountain (Continued)": "Studebacher Hoch"; "The Conclusion"		9:59
21.	"Homemade Radio Spot"		2:16
22.	"Tears Began to Fall (Single Version)" (June 6)		2:48
23.	"Junier Mintz Boogie" (Detroit, May 25)	Billy Dexter	2:56

== Personnel ==
- Frank Zappa – guitar, dialogue, vocals
- Ian Underwood – woodwinds, keyboards, vocals
- Aynsley Dunbar – drums
- Howard Kaylan – lead vocals, dialogue
- Mark Volman – lead vocals, dialogue
- Jim Pons – bass, vocals, dialogue
- Bob Harris – keyboards, vocals

Guests

- Don Preston – Minimoog (on 10)
- John Lennon – guitar & vocals (on 13-17)
- Yoko Ono – vocals (on 13-17)

== Production ==
- Producer: Frank Zappa
- Engineer: Barry Keene
- Mixing: Toby Foster
- Mastering: Toby Foster
- Digital remastering: Bob Stone
- Cover design: Cal Schenkel
- Artwork: Cal Schenkel
- Repackaging: Ferenc Dobronyi

== Charts ==
Chart (1971/72)	Peak position
United States (Billboard 200)	38
Australia (Kent Music Report)	24
