= Willie the Pimp =

Song by Frank Zappa

from the album Hot Rats
- Released: October 10, 1969
- Recorded: July–August 1969
- Genre: Blues rock; hard rock
- Length: 9:25
- Label: Bizarre/Rykodisc
- Songwriter: Frank Zappa
- Producer: Frank Zappa

"Willie the Pimp" is a song from Frank Zappa's 1969 album Hot Rats. It features an idiosyncratic Captain Beefheart vocal and one of Zappa's classic guitar solos. It is the only track that is not instrumental on the album, though the track features a long guitar solo.

== Background ==
The song also appeared as an instrumental on Zappa's Fillmore East – June 1971, originally split as the last track on side one (2:50) and continued on the first track on side two (1:54) of the LP. Another short version from the 1984 tour appeared on You Can't Do That on Stage Anymore, Vol. 4 as a 2'06" segue between "My Guitar Wants to Kill Your Mama" and "Montana".

The album title Hot Rats comes from the lyric of Willie the Pimp. The origin of the song was explained in a conversation Zappa recorded in 1969. This interview recording was later released as "The Story of Willie the Pimp" on the Zappa album Mystery Disc.

== Musicians ==
=== Hot Rats version ===
- Frank Zappa – guitar, percussion
- Ian Underwood – keyboards
- Captain Beefheart – vocal
- Sugarcane Harris – violin
- John Guerin – drums
- Max Bennett – bass

=== Fillmore East ===
- Frank Zappa – guitar, dialogue
- Mark Volman – lead vocals, dialogue
- Howard Kaylan – lead vocals, dialogue
- Ian Underwood – winds, keyboard, vocals
- Aynsley Dunbar – drums
- Jim Pons – bass, vocals, dialogue
- Bob Harris – 2nd keyboard, vocals

=== You Can't Do That on Stage Anymore, Vol. 4 ===
- Frank Zappa – lead guitar, vocal
- Ike Willis – guitar, vocal
- Ray White – guitar, vocal
- Bobby Martin – keyboards, sax, vocal
- Allan Zavod – keyboards
- Scott Thunes – bass
- Chad Wackerman – drums

== Cover versions ==
- Juicy Lucy covered "Willie the Pimp" on their 1970 release Lie Back and Enjoy It, their version was included in Andy Votel's compilation Vertigo Mixed, released in 2005.
- Aynsley Dunbar recorded a 14:55 version with his band Blue Whale in 1971. Dunbar was the drummer for Frank Zappa and the Mothers of Invention at the time the album was released.
- Stack Waddy on their 1972 album Bugger Off!.

== Reception ==
The song was ranked number 75 on the list of "The 100 Greatest Guitar Songs of All Time" of Rolling Stone.
