= Chunga's Revenge =

Album by Frank Zappa

- original issue cover

Studio album with live elements by Frank Zappa
- Released: October 23, 1970
- Recorded: July 5, 1969 – August 29, 1970 at TTG Studios, Los Angeles; Trident Studios, London; The Record Plant, Los Angeles; Whitney Recording Studios, Glendale, California; The Guthrie Theatre, Minneapolis
- Genre: Jazz fusion
- Length: 40:22
- Label: Bizarre/Reprise
- Producer: Frank Zappa

Frank Zappa chronology
Weasels Ripped My Flesh (1970)	Chunga's Revenge (1970)	Fillmore East – June 1971 (1971)

Frank Zappa (solo) chronology
Hot Rats (1969)	Chunga's Revenge (1970)	Waka/Jawaka (1972)

Singles from Chunga's Revenge
- 1. "Tell Me You Love Me" Released: 1970

Chunga's Revenge is a 1970 album by Frank Zappa, released on October 23 by Zappa's own label Bizarre, and distributed by Reprise Records. The album is the first appearance of former Turtles members Mark Volman and Howard Kaylan - nicknamed Flo & Eddie - on a Zappa record. The album was recorded between July 5, 1969 and August 29, 1970 at various studios in the US and London, UK. It is Zappa's third solo album, and eleventh album including those credited to The Mothers of Invention.

== Recording ==
The material presented on Chunga's Revenge is eclectic: side one includes a guitar jam ("Transylvania Boogie"), a bluesy amble ("Road Ladies"), a jazz interlude ("Twenty Small Cigars") and an avant garde live improvisation ("The Nancy and Mary Music") drawn from "King Kong" from a July 1970 Mothers performance, released officially on Road Tapes, Venue 3. Several poppy numbers ("Tell Me You Love Me", "Would You Go All the Way?", "Rudy Wants to Buy Yez a Drink", "Sharleena") appear on the second side along with the improvisational title track and a percussion-only track ("The Clap").

"Twenty Small Cigars" was drawn from the Hot Rats sessions from summer 1969. "Transylvania Boogie" and "Chunga's Revenge" come from the early 1970 period where Zappa performed with a band informally known as "Hot Rats," including Ian Underwood, Don "Sugarcane" Harris, Max Bennett and Aynsley Dunbar. Also from this period is "The Clap," a short multitracked percussion piece with Zappa as the only musician. The vocal tracks all deal with the subject of sex and/or groupie encounters and as Zappa notes on the sleeve of both the vinyl and CD, are a preview of the then forthcoming 200 Motels film/album, and date from the summer of 1970 after the formation of the new Mothers of Invention lineup.

The original early 1970 version of "Sharleena" later appeared on The Lost Episodes. In June 2023, Zappa Record/Ume released Funky Nothingness, an archival release drawn almost entirely from the early 1970 sessions, which also included this version of "Sharleena" as well as the unreleased instrumental "Twinkle Tits" that had appeared in a live concert recording from this era, and unedited takes of "Chunga's Revenge," "Transylvania Boogie" and "The Clap."

Another "lost" track from this era, "Bognor Regis," was recorded in summer 1969 and intended to be released as a B-side of "Sharleena", but the single was never released, and the track was leaked to the public on an acetate disc copy which made its way to the collector's market. "Bognor Regis" was later included along with "Twenty Small Cigars" in the archival release The Hot Rats Sessions.

The title track was later recorded by Argentinian/Parisian tango revival group Gotan Project for their 2001 debut album La Revancha del Tango.

The guitar melody in "Tell Me You Love Me" is extremely similar to the one used in "Bwana Dik" and "Daddy, Daddy, Daddy", during the "if his dick is a monster" section, from Fillmore East - June 1971, and 200 Motels, respectively. Zappa would include a 1980 live version of the song on Tinsel Town Rebellion, while a 1988 version with revised lyrics titled "Why Don't You Like Me" appeared on Broadway the Hard Way. (A similar version from 1984, known as "Don't Be a Lawyer," has never been officially released.) Zappa would also include an 80's recording of "Sharleena" on Them or Us, while a 1988 version of "Chunga's Revenge" where Zappa played alongside his son Dweezil was the opening track of the album Trance-Fusion which Zappa compiled in the 90's (although it would not be released until 2006).

== Critical reception ==
Professional ratings
Review scores
Source	Rating
AllMusic	3/5 stars
Christgau's Record Guide	C+
Rolling Stone	(unfavorable)

In a contemporary review in the leading French music magazine, Rock & Folk, Paul Alessandrini praises the album: "The richness, the musical intelligence of Zappa confirm once more his distinctive sound which is a 'chemical' synthesis of different styles. In the centre are the blues but also the rock'n roll of the fifties, always with satirical lyrics. This album is maybe less demanding that the last one, the utterly unique Weasels Ripped My Flesh, but Zappa confirms himself now as solid, mature and aware of his creative skills. Supported by the multi-instrumentalist Ian Underwood, he shows himself an all-round guitarist, versatile at all kinds of tempos and inventive with the wah-wah pedal."

In his 1994 book on Zappa, Ben Watson elaborates this point: " 'Transsylvanian Boogie' provides a vampire vamp for some of Zappa's most Eastern-sounding guitar. The title referred to the homeland of (...) Béla Bartók. (...) Bartok provides a crucial model for composers seeking to break out of the limitations of the Western tradition. The complex time-signature and Dunbar's shimmering cymbals are exotically bohemian, though there is a distinctly sci-fi flavour to Zappa's wah-wah guitar sound. The mid-section has him plucking irrational runs with some of Conlon Nancarrow's delirium: he builds to a peak note and then moves to an irresistible boogie, Underwood's organ grooving behind him, Dunbar contributing a new fluency."

However, this development was not to the liking of more tradition-orientated commentators. Reviewing Chunga's Revenge in Christgau's Record Guide: Rock Albums of the Seventies (1981), Robert Christgau wrote: "Like Bobby Sherman, Zappa is a selfish exploiter of popular taste. That Bobby Sherman wants to make money while Zappa wants to make money and emulate Varese is beside the point—if anything, Zappa's aestheticism intensifies his contempt for rock and its audience. Even Hot Rats, his compositional peak, played as much with the moods and usages of Muzak as with those of rock and roll. This is definitely not his peak. Zappa plays a lot of guitar, just as his admirers always hope he will, but the overall effect is more Martin Denny than Varese. Also featured are a number of 'dirty' jokes."

== Track listing ==
All tracks are written by Frank Zappa.

Side one
No.	Title	Length
1.	"Transylvania Boogie" (instrumental)	5:01
2.	"Road Ladies"	4:10
3.	"Twenty Small Cigars" (instrumental)	2:17
4.	"The Nancy & Mary Music"	9:27
Total length:		20:55

Side two
No.	Title	Length
1.	"Tell Me You Love Me"	2:33
2.	"Would You Go All the Way?"	2:29
3.	"Chunga's Revenge" (instrumental)	6:15
4.	"The Clap" (instrumental)	1:23
5.	"Rudy Wants to Buy Yez a Drink"	2:44
6.	"Sharleena"	4:04
Total length:		19:28

== Personnel ==
- Frank Zappa – guitar (except 8), vocals (2, 6, 9, 10), harpsichord (3), Condor (5), drums and percussions (8)
- Ian Underwood – organ (1), rhythm guitar (2, 5), piano (3), electric piano (4, 6, 9), alto saxophone (4), pipe organ (5), electric alto saxophone with wah-wah pedal (7), tenor saxophone and grand piano (10)
- Aynsley Dunbar – drums (except 3, 8), tambourine (9)
- John Guerin – drums (3)
- Max Bennett – bass (1, 3, 7)
- Jeff Simmons – bass (2, 4—6, 9, 10), vocals (2, 4, 9, 10)
- George Duke – organ (2, 10), electric piano (4, 5), vocal sound effects (4), trombone (6, 9)
- Howard Kaylan – vocals (2, 4—6, 9, 10)
- Mark Volman – vocals (2, 4—6, 9, 10), rhythm guitar (9)
- Don "Sugarcane" Harris – organ (7)

== Production ==
- Producer: Frank Zappa
- Engineers: Stan Agol, Roy Baker, Dick Kunc, Bruce Margolis
- Production assistant: Dick Barber
- Arranger: Frank Zappa
- Cover design: Cal Schenkel
- Illustrations: Cal Schenkel
- Photography: Phil Franks (front cover) and John Williams

== Charts ==
=== Weekly charts ===
Weekly chart performance for Chunga's Revenge
Chart (1970–1971)	Peak position
Australian Albums (Kent Music Report)	24
Canada (RPM)	69
Dutch Albums (Album Top 100)	3
UK Albums (Official Charts)	43
US Billboard 200	119

=== Year-end charts ===
Year-end chart performance for Chunga's Revenge
Chart (1971)	Position
Dutch Albums (Album Top 100)	48
