= Son of Cheep Thrills =

Compilation album by Frank Zappa
- Released: April 27th, 1999
- Genres: Experimental rock, progressive rock
- Length: 44:52
- Label: Rykodisc
- Producer: F.Z.

Frank Zappa chronology
Mystery Disc (1998)	Son of Cheep Thrills (1999)	Joe's Corsage (2004)

Professional ratings
Review scores
Source	Rating
Allmusic	2.5/5 stars
PopMatters	(6/10)

Son of Cheep Thrills is a compilation album by Frank Zappa, with material from previously released albums.

== Track listing ==
All tracks by Frank Zappa, except as noted.

1. "WPLJ" (The Four Deuces) – 2:52 (from Burnt Weeny Sandwich, 1970)
2. "Twenty Small Cigars" – 2:17 (from Chunga's Revenge, 1970)
3. "The Legend of the Golden Arches" – 3:27 (from Uncle Meat, 1969)
4. "Ya Hozna" – 6:26 (from Them or Us, 1984)
5. "It Just Might Be a One-Shot Deal" – 4:16 (from Waka/Jawaka, 1972)
6. "Love of My Life" (live version) – 2:15 (from Tinsel Town Rebellion, 1981)
7. "Disco Boy" (live soundtrack version) – 3:51 (from Baby Snakes, 1983)
8. "Night School" – 4:47 (from Jazz from Hell, 1986)
9. "Sinister Footwear 2nd Mvt." (live version) – 6:26 (from Make a Jazz Noise Here, 1991)
10. "The Idiot Bastard Son" (live version) – 2:39 (from You Can't Do That on Stage Anymore, Vol. 2, 1988)
11. "What's New in Baltimore?" – 5:20 (from Frank Zappa Meets the Mothers of Prevention, 1985)

== Personnel ==
- Compiled by the original Joe Black
- Intramural sports by David Greenberg
- Mastered by Toby Mountain, Northeastern Digital Recording
- Artwerks by Cal Schenkel
- Pre-taping audience warm-up by David Baker
