= Duodenum (song) =

1968 song by Frank Zappa

Song by Frank Zappa

from the album Lumpy Gravy
- Released: May 13, 1968
- Genre: Surf
- Length: 1:32
- Label: Verve
- Songwriter: Frank Zappa
- Producers: Nick Venet, Frank Zappa

"Bwana Dik"

Song by The Mothers

from the album Fillmore East - June 1971
- Released: August 2, 1971
- Genre: Comedy rock
- Length: 2:21
- Label: Bizarre, Reprise
- Songwriter: Frank Zappa
- Producer: Frank Zappa

"Duodenum" is a song by Frank Zappa that first appeared as part of "Lumpy Gravy Part One" on the Verve Records edition of Lumpy Gravy. A surf music instrumental (although it contains vocals on the 1984 Lumpy Gravy remix), it runs for approximately 1:32 and is the second identifiable track on the album, preceded by "The Way I See It, Barry" and followed by "Oh No". Documentation purports that this piece was likely produced and recorded by Zappa sometime between 1963 and 1965.

The duodenum, in anatomy, is part of the digestive system and connects the stomach to the small intestine.

Fillmore East - June 1971, released in 1971, contains a performance of "Duodenum" with added lyrics under the name "Bwana Dik". The song was used as part of a routine during which the band member most considerably endowed or popular with groupies was given the moniker "Bwana Dik".

"Duodenum" also appears in its instrumental form on the 1991 live double album Make a Jazz Noise Here as "Theme from Lumpy Gravy."

The Persuasions, the classic doo-wop a cappella group that Frank Zappa signed to his Bizarre label in the 1960s, covered "Duodenum" as their album opener on their 2000 Zappa tribute, "Frankly A Cappella: The Persuasions Sing Zappa."

The Spotnicks released a cover of the track under the name "Lumpy Gravy" as the B-side to a cover of Diamonds (instrumental) by Jet Harris.

The Tokyo Ska Paradise Orchestra covered the track as "Theme from Lumpy Gravy" on their 2010 album "Goldfingers."
