= 200 Motels (soundtrack) =

Soundtrack album by Frank Zappa
- Released: October 4, 1971
- Recorded: January 28 – February 5, 1971; April 1971
- Studio: Pinewood Studios (Iver Heath); Whitney Studios (Glendale, CA)
- Genre: Avant-garde; comedy rock; experimental
- Length: 86:41; 434:25 (50th Anniversary 6CD)
- Label: United Artists
- Producer: Frank Zappa

Frank Zappa chronology
| Fillmore East – June 1971 (1971) | 200 Motels (1971) | Just Another Band from L.A. (1972) |

Singles from 200 Motels
- 1. "Magic Fingers" Released: 1971; 2. "What Will This Evening Bring Me This Morning" Released: 1971

200 Motels, the soundtrack album to Frank Zappa's film of the same name, was released by United Artists Records in 1971. The original vinyl release was a two-record set, largely containing alternating tracks of rock music performed by the Mothers of Invention and symphonic music performed by the Royal Philharmonic Orchestra conducted by Elgar Howarth, all composed and orchestrated by Zappa. The album peaked at No. 59 on the Billboard 200, though reviewers deemed it a peripheral part of Zappa's catalog. Like the film, the album involves the theme of a rock band on tour and a loose satirical storyline about The Mothers of Invention going crazy in the small town of Centerville and bassist Jeff quitting the group, as did his real life counterpart, Jeff Simmons, who left the group before the film began shooting and was replaced by actor Martin Lickert for the film.

== Music and lyrics ==
The rock and comedy songs "Mystery Roach", "Lonesome Cowboy Burt", "Daddy, Daddy, Daddy", "What Will This Evening Bring Me This Morning" and "Magic Fingers", and the finale "Strictly Genteel", which mixes orchestral and rock elements, were noted as highlights of the album by reviewer Richie Unterberger. François Couture, a reviewer for Allmusic, said that "Mystery Roach" contains multiple meanings, all of which have a connection to lyrical subject matter in Zappa's discography. These include the freshwater fish, as the Mothers of Invention live album Fillmore East - June 1971 contained a song referring to the mud shark, a cannabis cigarette butt, which causes the character Jeff to go crazy within the context of the film's storyline, and a combed roll hairstyle, which connects the song lyrically to "Jelly Roll Gumdrop", a song from Cruising with Ruben & the Jets. The version on the album is different from the version in the film, as it is missing small electric guitar solos by Zappa, and was not scripted as part of the film in its electric arrangement, having originally been written in three separate, unused acoustic blues-oriented arrangements. The song was not performed live.

"Dance of the Rock & Roll Interviewers" is an orchestral piece originally intended to be paired with "Touring Can Make You Crazy" as part of an early scene in which the band arrives in Centerville and is greeted by music journalists, but only part of the sequence, depicting a mannequin of Zappa being torn apart by the journalists, appeared in the final film, due to timing and budget restraints, and the "Touring Can Make You Crazy" sequence was not shot and does not appear in the film. Regarding "Touring", Couture writes that "The long double-bass notes and the overall dark atmosphere and slow tempo suggest a tiring trip."

The album features five segments which form the suite "This Town Is A Sealed Tuna Sandwich": a prologue, the "Tuna Fish Promenade", "Dance of the Just Plain Folks", a reprise of the main melody, and the conclusion "The Sealed Tuna Bolero". Only the final bolero was featured in the film. The "Tuna Sandwich" suite was scripted as being proceeded by the sequence and composition "Centerville". "Would You Like A Snack?" is a vocal version of Zappa's composition "Holiday in Berlin", which reappears throughout the album and film in different arrangements, including the "Semi-Fraudulent/Direct-From-Hollywood Overture". The lyrics of "Would You Like A Snack?" are similar to the theater piece on Zappa's live album Ahead of Their Time. Zappa earlier recorded an unrelated song of the same name, which features members of the Mothers of Invention and Jefferson Airplane singer Grace Slick.

"Redneck Eats" begins and ends with spoken dialogue featuring the character Lonesome Cowboy Burt (played by Jimmy Carl Black) heckling the orchestra, which is performing an Igor Stravinsky and Edgard Varese-influenced composition. "Janet's Big Dance Number" is about one of the film's two groupie characters and features "Slow piano chords [...] played over sustained contrabass notes. The choir enters late in the piece, picking up the Stravinskian melody sketched by the chords." "Lucy's Seduction of a Bored Violinist", follows the other groupie character, and features "a soft melody, followed by a rhythm break and a tympany roll" and a faster reprise of the "Janet" melody. The album pairs "Lucy" with the film's "Postlude", which appears during the ending credits, and is played on a harpsichord.

The second half of the album begins with the suite "Dental Hygiene Dilemma", which begins with "I'm Stealing The Towels", for which the corresponding film sequence was scripted and partially shot, before it was determined that the footage was unusable, and the sequence was cut. The main part of the suite, "Dental Hygiene Dilemma", appeared in the film as an animated cartoon by Charles Swenson, who later directed the film Down and Dirty Duck with Mothers of Invention band members and 200 Motels stars Mark Volman and Howard Kaylan.

The main part of the suite, "Dental Hygiene Dilemma" incorporates a rock band, the orchestra, and spoken dialogue, and depicts Jeff smoking a marijuana cigarette which had been dipped in Don Preston's "foamy liquids" and imagining Donovan appearing to him on a wall-mounted television as his "good conscience" and asking him not to steal the towels, while Studebacher Hoch appears to him as his evil conscience, "dressed as Jim Pons", and persuades Jeff to quit the Mothers of Invention, start his own hard rock band and play music like Grand Funk Railroad or Black Sabbath. In real life, Simmons started his own blues rock band after leaving Zappa's band, and released the album Lucille Has Messed My Mind Up for Straight Records, which Zappa produced. In "Dilemma", Volman exclaims "We got to get him back to normal before Zappa finds out and steals it and makes him do it in the movie!"

"A Nun Suit Painted on Some Old Boxes" is the first part of a suite for soprano voice, chorus, and orchestra called "I Have Seen the Pleated Gazelle". The suite criticizes organized religion and references dental floss, connecting the suite to Zappa's later song "Montana", appearing on the album Over-Nite Sensation. In the film, "A Nun Suit" precedes the "Dental Hygiene Dilemma" cartoon, but is placed before the rock song "Magic Fingers" on this album, removing the context of the line "Want to watch a dental hygiene movie?" The "Gazelle" suite continues with "Motorhead's Midnight Ranch", "Dew on the Newts We Got" and "The Lad Searches the Night for His Newts", for which the corresponding film sequence was only partially shot.

== Release and reception ==
Professional ratings
Review scores
| Source | Rating |
|---|---|
| Allmusic | 4/5 stars |
| Entertainment Weekly | (B) |

200 Motels charted at No. 59 on the Billboard 200. The album was released on compact disc for the first time in 1997 at the same time as a theatrical reissue of the film. The CD edition contained extensive liner notes and artwork, a small poster for the film, and bonus tracks consisting of radio promos for the film and the single edit of the song "Magic Fingers". The album was reissued in 2021 in two editions: the original album on 2 CDs and an extended version on 6 CDs (again including a facsimile of the original film poster).

The album was deemed to be a peripheral album in Zappa's catalog by music critics. Allmusic's Richie Unterberger critiqued what he referred to as the "growing tendency to deploy the smutty, cheap humor that would soon dominate much of Zappa's work" but said that "Those who like his late-'60s/early-'70s work [...] will probably like this fine".

== Track listing ==
All tracks are written by Frank Zappa.

Side one
| No. | Title | Length |
|---|---|---|
| 1. | "Semi-Fraudulent/Direct-From-Hollywood Overture" | 2:01 |
| 2. | "Mystery Roach" | 2:32 |
| 3. | "Dance of the Rock & Roll Interviewers" | 0:48 |
| 4. | "This Town Is a Sealed Tuna Sandwich" (Prologue) | 0:55 |
| 5. | "Tuna Fish Promenade" | 2:29 |
| 6. | "Dance of the Just Plain Folks" | 4:40 |
| 7. | "This Town Is a Sealed Tuna Sandwich" (Reprise) | 0:58 |
| 8. | "The Sealed Tuna Bolero" | 1:40 |
| 9. | "Lonesome Cowboy Burt" | 3:54 |
| Total length: | | 19:57 |

Side two
| No. | Title | Length |
|---|---|---|
| 1. | "Touring Can Make You Crazy" | 2:54 |
| 2. | "Would You Like a Snack?" | 1:23 |
| 3. | "Redneck Eats" | 3:02 |
| 4. | "Centerville" | 2:31 |
| 5. | "She Painted up Her Face" | 1:41 |
| 6. | "Janet's Big Dance Number" | 1:18 |
| 7. | "Half a Dozen Provocative Squats" | 1:57 |
| 8. | "Mysterioso" | 0:48 |
| 9. | "Shove It Right In" | 2:32 |
| 10. | "Lucy's Seduction of a Bored Violinist & Postlude" | 4:01 |
| Total length: | | 23:03 |

Side three
| No. | Title | Length |
|---|---|---|
| 1. | "I'm Stealing the Towels" | 2:15 |
| 2. | "Dental Hygiene Dilemma" | 5:11 |
| 3. | "Does This Kind of Life Look Interesting to You?" | 2:59 |
| 4. | "Daddy, Daddy, Daddy" | 3:11 |
| 5. | "Penis Dimension" | 4:37 |
| 6. | "What Will This Evening Bring Me This Morning" | 3:29 |
| Total length: | | 21:42 |

Side four
| No. | Title | Length |
|---|---|---|
| 1. | "A Nun Suit Painted on Some Old Boxes" | 1:08 |
| 2. | "Magic Fingers" | 3:53 |
| 3. | "Motorhead's Midnight Ranch" | 1:28 |
| 4. | "Dew on the Newts We Got" | 1:09 |
| 5. | "The Lad Searches the Night for His Newts" | 0:41 |
| 6. | "The Girl Wants to Fix Him Some Broth" | 1:10 |
| 7. | "The Girl's Dream" | 0:54 |
| 8. | "Little Green Scratchy Sweaters & Corduroy Ponce" | 1:00 |
| 9. | "Strictly Genteel (The Finale)" | 11:08 |
| Total length: | | 22:31 |

First Rykodisc CD edition bonus tracks
| No. | Title | Length |
|---|---|---|
| 1. | "Coming Soon!" (Cut 1) | 0:56 |
| 2. | "The Wide Screen" (Cut 2) | 0:57 |
| 3. | "Coming Soon!" (Cut 3) | 0:31 |
| 4. | "Frank Zappa's 200 Motels" (Cut 4) | 0:11 |
| 5. | "Magic Fingers" (Single Edit) | 2:57 |
| 6. | "Original Theatrical Trailer" (ENHANCED TRACK) | 3:28 |

=== 50th Anniversary 6CD ===
CD1 contains sides one, two, and three of the vinyl album

CD2 contains side four of the vinyl album, then continues:

200 Motels Demos, 2nd Movement - Rock Music
| No. | Title | Length |
|---|---|---|
| 10. | "Road Ladies" (Alternate Mix) | 4:10 |
| 11. | "What Will This Morning Bring Me This Evening" | 2:44 |
| 12. | "What Kind Of Girl Do You Think We Are?" | 4:53 |
| 13. | "Bwana Dik" | 3:06 |
| 14. | "Daddy, Daddy, Daddy" | 3:02 |
| 15. | "Do You Like My New Car?" | 3:11 |
| 16. | "Magic Fingers" | 2:46 |
| 17. | "Phyllis & Aynsley" | 1:54 |
| 18. | "What Will This Evening Bring Me This Morning" (Alternate Mix) | 4:04 |

200 Motels Demo Session Outtakes
| No. | Title | Length |
|---|---|---|
| 19. | "Tell Me You Love Me (Mix Outtake)" | 3:07 |
| 20. | "Road Ladies (Alternate Take)" | 4:30 |
| 21. | "What Will This Morning Bring Me This Evening (Studio Outtakes)" | 2:29 |
| 22. | "What Will This Morning Bring Me This Evening (Alternate Take, Incomplete)" | 2:50 |
| 23. | ""Aynsley Dunbar, Ladies & Gentlemen"" | 0:46 |
| 24. | "Magic Fingers (Version B, Mix Outtake)" | 2:54 |
| 25. | "What Will This Evening Bring Me This Morning (Mix Outtake)" | 3:04 |
| 26. | "Tell Me You Love Me (Alternate Take)" | 3:35 |
| Total length: | | 76:01 |

CD3: 200 Motels – Dialog Protection Reels
| No. | Title | Length |
|---|---|---|
| 1. | "Scene 1-2: Semi-Fraudulent/Direct-From-Hollywood Overture" | 2:02 |
| 2. | "Scene 3: "What's The Deal?"" | 2:00 |
| 3. | "Mystery Roach" | 3:32 |
| 4. | "Scene 32: "It's A Good Thing We Get Paid To Do This…"" | 2:16 |
| 5. | "Scene 14: What's The Name Of Your Group? I" | 0:58 |
| 6. | "Scene 32: "We Haven't Formed The Group Yet"" | 1:27 |
| 7. | "Scene 15: What's The Name Of Your Group? II" | 1:42 |
| 8. | "Scene 17: "When Do We Get Paid?"" | 5:13 |
| 9. | "Scene 18: Went On The Road" | 1:42 |
| 10. | "Scene 19-20: "Special Delivery"" | 3:12 |
| 11. | "Scene 21: Centerville" | 2:09 |
| 12. | "Scene 21: Janet & Lucy" | 0:45 |
| 13. | "Scene 22: This Town Is A Sealed Tuna Sandwich" | 0:56 |
| 14. | "Scene 23-24: Tuna Fish Promenade" | 2:30 |
| 15. | "Scene 28: The Sealed Tuna Bolero" | 1:42 |
| 16. | "Scene 29: Lonesome Cowboy Burt" | 3:51 |
| 17. | "Scene 30: JCB & Rance" | 2:29 |
| 18. | "Scene 21: Larry The Dwarf" | 2:12 |
| 19. | "Scene 81: Magic Fingers" | 3:54 |
| 20. | "Scene 47: Larry The Dwarf In The Hotel Room" | 2:31 |
| 21. | "Scene 33: The Lad Searches The Night For His Newts" | 0:32 |
| 22. | "Scene 40-41: The Girl Wants To Fix Him Some Broth" | 2:05 |
| 23. | "Scene 42: Little Green Scratchy Sweaters & Courduroy Ponce" | 1:01 |
| 24. | "Scene 45: A Nun Suit Painted On Some Old Boxes" | 1:08 |
| 25. | "Scene 57: The Perverted Nun" | 3:27 |
| 26. | "Scene 87: "Penis!"" | 3:01 |
| 27. | "Scene 58: She Painted Up Her Face" | 1:44 |
| 28. | "Scene 60: Janet's Big Dance Number" | 1:14 |
| 29. | "Scene 61: Half A Dozen Provocative Squats" | 1:55 |
| 30. | "Scene 62: Lucy's Seduction Of A Bored Violinist" | 1:21 |
| 31. | "Scene 63: Shove It Right In" | 2:32 |
| 32. | "Scene 67: "I Am Bwana Dik!"" | 1:47 |
| 33. | "Scene 68-69: What Will This Morning Bring Me This Evening" | 2:39 |
| 34. | "Scene 77: Daddy, Daddy, Daddy" | 3:19 |
| Total length: | | 74:48 |

CD4: 200 Motels – Dialog Protection Reels (cont'd)
| No. | Title | Length |
|---|---|---|
| 1. | "Scene 90: Biff Debris & Jeff" | 4:39 |
| 2. | "Scene 84-85: Penis Dimension" | 4:39 |
| 3. | "Scene 32: Mystery Roach (Acoustic) / "Yeah? Well Fine!"" | 1:21 |
| 4. | "Scene 71: What Will The Evening Bring Me This Morning" | 1:40 |
| 5. | "Scene 92: Jeff Flips Out / I'm Stealing The Room" | 2:56 |
| 6. | "Scene 100: Strictly Genteel" | 5:02 |
| 7. | "Scene 100: 200 Motels Finale" | 10:12 |

Bonus Swill, Part 1
| No. | Title | Length |
|---|---|---|
| 8. | ""I Was Gonna Make A Movie One Time…"" | 0:20 |
| 9. | "200 Motels Movie Ad #1" | 0:25 |
| 10. | "What's The Name Of Your Group? (FZ Edit)" | 2:59 |
| 11. | "200 Motels Movie Ad #2" | 0:57 |
| 12. | "FZ on Ringo Starr" | 0:15 |
| 13. | "Ringo Starr on 200 Motels" | 2:59 |
| 14. | "200 Motels Movie Ad #3" | 0:54 |
| 15. | "Motorhead's Midnight Ranch (Mix Outtake)" | 1:31 |
| 16. | "Looking For Newts" | 3:21 |
| 17. | ""They Are Only In It For The Money"" | 1:09 |
| 18. | "200 Motels Movie Ad #4" | 0:27 |
| 19. | "200 Motels Commercial Session Outtakes" | 10:42 |
| 20. | "Does This Kind Of Life Look Interesting To You? (Mix Outtake)" | 2:26 |
| 21. | ""I Shall Ruin All The Tapes"" | 0:25 |
| 22. | "Janet's Big Dance Number (Basic Tracks)" | 1:20 |
| 23. | "Martin Lickert Voice-Over" | 0:22 |
| 24. | "Touring Can Make You Crazy (Mix Outtake)" | 2:53 |
| 25. | "Penis Dimension (Instrumental Alternate Take)" | 2:13 |
| 26. | "Centerville (Mix Outtake)" | 2:51 |
| 27. | "Mystery Roach (Alternate Master)" | 3:26 |
| 28. | "Magic Fingers (Mix Outtake)" | 2:58 |
| 29. | "200 Motels Movie Ad #5" | 0:55 |
| Total length: | | 73:18 |

CD5: 200 Motels – Vault Alternates and Outtakes
| No. | Title | Length |
|---|---|---|
| 1. | "What Is 200 Motels?" | 2:59 |
| 2. | "Theodore Bikel Voice-Over (Alternate Take)" | 0:32 |
| 3. | "Semi-Fraudulent/Direct-From-Hollywood Overture (Mix Outtake)" | 2:10 |
| 4. | "What's The Name Of Your Group? (Complete Sequence, Part I)" | 3:43 |
| 5. | "What's The Name Of Your Group? (Complete Sequence, Part II)" | 2:45 |
| 6. | "What's The Name Of Your Group? (Complete Sequence, Part III)" | 2:13 |
| 7. | "Can I Help You With This Dummy?" | 2:05 |
| 8. | "Pianos For The Pleated Gazelle" | 1:16 |
| 9. | "Synth Tracks I" | 1:29 |
| 10. | "Would You Like A Snack? (Alternate Take)" | 2:11 |
| 11. | "Howard Kaylan/Mark Volman Voice-Over" | 0:16 |
| 12. | "Centerville (Rough Mix)" | 2:53 |
| 13. | "This Town Is A Sealed Tuna Sandwich (Prologue, Mix Outtake)" | 0:56 |
| 14. | "Tuna Fish Promenade (Mix Outtake)" | 2:31 |
| 15. | "The Sealed Tuna Bolero (Alternate Take)" | 1:41 |
| 16. | "Lonesome Cowboy Burt (Mix Outtake)" | 3:52 |
| 17. | "Naval Aviation In Art?" | 2:17 |
| 18. | "Redneck Eats/The Restaurant Scene (Basic Tracks)" | 3:50 |
| 19. | "Mystery Roach (Basic Tracks)" | 4:06 |
| 20. | "I Have Seen The Pleated Gazelle" | 6:16 |
| 21. | "Dew On The Newts We Got (Rough Mix)" | 1:12 |
| 22. | "The Lad Searches The Night For His Newts (Rough Mix)" | 0:52 |
| 23. | "Motorhead's Midnight Ranch (Rough Mix)" | 2:04 |
| 24. | "The Girl Wants To Fix Him Some Broth (Rough Mix, Alternate Ending)" | 1:12 |
| 25. | "The Girl's Dream (Rough Mix)" | 0:56 |
| 26. | "Little Green Scratchy Sweaters And Courduroy Ponce" | 1:15 |
| 27. | "Scene 43: A Cardboard Box" | 0:39 |
| 28. | "Scene 44" | 0:50 |
| 29. | "A Nun Suit Painted On Some Old Boxes (Rough Mix)" | 1:10 |
| 30. | "She Painted Up Her Face (Compressed Mix)" | 1:42 |
| 31. | "The Secret Stare" | 3:25 |
| 32. | "Half A Dozen Provocative Squats (Compressed Mix)" | 1:56 |
| 33. | "Lucy's Seduction Of A Bored Violinist (Basic Tracks)" | 1:32 |
| 34. | "Shove It Right In (Compressed Mix)" | 2:33 |
| 35. | "Postlude (Basic Tracks)" | 3:08 |
| 36. | "What Will This Evening Bring Me This Morning (Mix Outtake)" | 4:07 |
| Total length: | | 78:35 |

CD6: 200 Motels – Vault Alternates and Outtakes
| No. | Title | Length |
|---|---|---|
| 1. | "Daddy, Daddy, Daddy" (Alternate Take) | 3:16 |
| 2. | "Magic Fingers" (Alternate Take) | 3:41 |
| 3. | "Penis Dimension" (Basic Tracks) | 4:40 |
| 4. | "Scene 86" | 1:28 |
| 5. | "Scene 87" (Alternate Take) | 3:16 |
| 6. | "Synth Tracks II" | 1:58 |
| 7. | "I'm Stealing The Towels" (Basic Tracks, Alternate Take) | 2:15 |
| 8. | "Scene 94: "He's Always Watching Me"" | 0:34 |
| 9. | "Dental Hygiene Dilemma (Part I, Basic Tracks)" | 6:21 |
| 10. | "Does This Kind Of Life Look Interesting To You?" (Mix Outtake) | 0:53 |
| 11. | "Dental Hygiene Dilemma (Part II, Basic Tracks)" | 2:44 |
| 12. | "Strictly Genteel" (Basic Tracks) | 8:05 |
| 13. | "200 Motels Finale" (Alternate Take) | 3:17 |
| 14. | "200 Motels Finale" (Basic Tracks, Unedited Ending) | 5:59 |

Bonus Swill, Part 2
| No. | Title | Length |
|---|---|---|
| 15. | "Movie Theater Skit (Commercial Session Outtake)" | 1:29 |
| 16. | "200 Motels Album Ad #1" | 1:01 |
| 17. | "Script Rehearsal Trim" | 2:50 |
| 18. | "Lonesome Cowboy Burt (In Rehearsal 1969)" | 2:56 |
| 19. | "Lonesome Cowboy Burt (In Rehearsal 1970)" | 3:38 |
| 20. | "200 Motels Album Ad #2" | 0:31 |
| 21. | "Penis Dimension Jingle Music" | 0:18 |
| 22. | "TV Hype (Commercial Session Outtake)" | 6:36 |
| 23. | "200 Motels Movie Ad # 6" | 0:11 |
| Total length: | | 67:57 |

== Personnel ==
- Frank Zappa – bass guitar, guitar, drums, producer, orchestration
- George Duke – trombone, keyboards
- Ian Underwood – keyboards, woodwinds
- Big Jim Sullivan – guitar, orchestration
- Martin Lickert – bass guitar
- Aynsley Dunbar – drums
- Ruth Underwood – percussion
- Jimmy Carl Black – vocals
- Howard Kaylan – vocals
- Jim Pons – voices
- Mark Volman – vocals, photography
- Theodore Bikel – narrator
- Royal Philharmonic Orchestra conducted by Elgar Howarth
- Top Score Singers conducted by David Van Asch
- Classical Guitar Ensemble supervised by John Williams

Production

- Bob Auger – engineer
- David McMacken – design, illustrations
- Cal Schenkel – design
- Barry Keene – overdubs, remixing
- Patrick Pending – liner notes

== Charts ==
=== Weekly charts ===
Initial weekly chart performance for 200 Motels
| Chart (1971–1972) | Peak position |
|---|---|
| Australian Albums (ARIA) | 48 |
| Dutch Albums (Album Top 100) | 7 |
| US Billboard 200 | 59 |

2021 weekly chart performance for 200 Motels
| Chart (2021) | Peak position |
|---|---|
| Belgian Albums (Ultratop Flanders) | 107 |
| Dutch Albums (Album Top 100) | 79 |
| German Albums (Offizielle Top 100) | 44 |
| Swiss Albums (Schweizer Hitparade) | 41 |
| UK Albums (OCC) | 89 |

=== Year-end charts ===
Year-end chart performance for 200 Motels
| Chart (1971) | Position |
|---|---|
| Dutch Albums (Album Top 100) | 49 |
