= Hot Rats =

American rock album

Studio album by Frank Zappa
- Released: October 10, 1969
- Recorded: July 18 – August 30, 1969; T.T.G., Los Angeles; Sunset Sound, Los Angeles; Whitney Studios, Glendale using 16-track
- Genres: Jazz fusion; blues rock; instrumental rock
- Length: 43:11
- Label: Bizarre/Reprise
- Producer: Frank Zappa

Frank Zappa chronology
Uncle Meat (1969)	Hot Rats (1969)	Burnt Weeny Sandwich (1970)

Frank Zappa (solo) chronology
Lumpy Gravy (1968)	Hot Rats (1969)	Chunga's Revenge (1970)

Singles from Hot Rats
- 1. "Peaches en Regalia" Released: 1970

Hot Rats is the second solo album and eighth overall album by Frank Zappa, released in October 1969. It was Zappa's first recording project after the dissolution of the original lineup of the Mothers of Invention. Five of the six songs are instrumental, while "Willie the Pimp" features vocals by Captain Beefheart. In his original sleeve notes, Zappa described the album as "a movie for your ears".

Zappa dedicated the album to his newborn son, Dweezil. In February 2009, Dweezil's tribute band to his father, Zappa Plays Zappa, won a Grammy for Best Rock Instrumental Performance for their rendition of "Peaches en Regalia".

== Background ==
After the release of Uncle Meat in April 1969, The Mothers of Invention embarked on a short UK tour, followed by extensive touring of the US and Canada from June through August. It was during this period that the financial strain of supporting a ten-piece band (each of whom was paid $200 a week) began to weigh on Zappa, who considered splitting up the group. One indication that he would do so was the start of work on his second solo album, which began in mid-July. Besides Zappa, multi-instrumentalist Ian Underwood was the only member of the current Mothers lineup to appear on the album, with Underwood also acting as Zappa's primary musical collaborator. Other featured musicians were bassists Max Bennett and Shuggie Otis (who was 15 years old at the time of the session); drummers John Guerin, Paul Humphrey and Ron Selico; and electric violinists Don "Sugarcane" Harris and Jean-Luc Ponty. Just after the sessions were finished in late August, Zappa formally disbanded the original Mothers of Invention.

== Recording ==
The album was recorded on what Zappa described as a "homemade 16-track" recorder; the machine was custom built by engineers at TTG Studios in Hollywood in late 1968. Additional tracks made it possible for Zappa to add multiple horn, percussion and keyboard overdubs. For the first time on a rock album, 16-track recording made it possible to create a stereo drum sound, with four of the 16 tracks assigned to the drum kit alone. With this technology, only a few musicians were required to create an especially rich instrumental texture, which mimics the sound of a large group. It was this use of advanced overdubbing that was the main motivation for Zappa, who hated playing in a studio. Because Hot Rats largely consists of instrumental jazz-influenced compositions with extensive soloing, the music sounds very different from earlier Zappa albums, which had featured satirical vocal performances along with extensive use of musique concrète and editing.

Sessions began on July 18, 1969 at T.T.G. Studios with Ian Underwood playing two piano compositions. A part of the first, "Piano Music (Section 1)", would be included in "The Little House I Used to Live In" on the following album Burnt Weeny Sandwich while an excerpt of "Piano Music (Section 3)" became "Aybe Sea" on the same album. When sessions resumed on July 28, 18 takes of section one of "Peaches en Regalia" were attempted, with take 18 providing the master. This was followed by two "Peaches Jam" takes, which was meant to comprise the middle portion of the song but edited out of the final version. Finally, 10 takes of section three (with take 10 being the master) were taped. In addition, 12 takes of "Arabesque" (which would later be used as the first part of "Toads of the Short Forest" on Weasels Ripped My Flesh) and three takes of "Dame Margret's Son to Be a Bride" (which would be retitled "Lemme Take You to the Beach" on Studio Tan) were recorded.

On July 29, 9 takes of "It Must Be a Camel" (with take 9 providing the master), 4 takes of "Natasha" (renamed "Little Umbrellas"), one take of the unreleased jam "Bognor Regis", one 15-minute master take of "Willie the Pimp" along with various guitar overdubs, 14 takes of "Transition" (an excerpt of which was titled "Twenty Small Cigars" on 1970's Chunga's Revenge) and one take of the unreleased jam "Lil' Clanton Shuffle" were all cut. On July 30, one take of "Directly from My Heart to You" (edited for inclusion on Weasels Ripped My Flesh), one take of the 28-minute jam "Another Waltz" (a large part of which was included in "The Little House I Used to Live In"), a remake of "Dame Margret's Son to Be a Bride", three takes of "Son of Mr. Green Genes" and two takes of "Big Legs" (to be edited and renamed "Gumbo Variations") were completed.

The sessions then moved to Sunset Sound Recorders and Whitney Studios between August 25-30 for overdubs, including guitars, bass, keyboards, woodwinds and percussion all played by Zappa and Underwood, in addition to Jean-Luc Ponty's violin on "It Must Be a Camel."

== Artwork ==
The colorful, psychedelic aura of the late sixties is apparent in the graphic design and photography of Hot Rats. Cal Schenkel, who did much of the album artwork for Zappa at the time, was credited with the album's cover design. The front and back cover photos by Andee Nathanson use infrared photography and reflect Zappa's taste for striking visual images, combined with the absurdly humorous. The woman pictured on the cover is Christine Frka, alias Miss Christine of The GTOs. For years these cover photos were incorrectly credited to Ed Caraeff. The inside of the original gatefold LP cover features a collage of color pictures, many of which were taken during the recording sessions.

== Release history ==
The LP was released on the blue Bizarre label in the United States in 1969. In 1973 the album was re-issued by Reprise Records. This version was deleted in 1981 when Zappa's contract with record distributor Warner Bros. Records ended.

In 1987 Zappa remixed Hot Rats for re-issue on CD by Rykodisc. On this edition many of the gatefold photos were removed, and the few that were included were printed in black and white. "Willie the Pimp" is edited differently during the introduction and guitar solo. "The Gumbo Variations" is four minutes longer; it includes an introduction and guitar and saxophone solo sections which were left out of the LP version. On "Little Umbrellas", the piano and flute are more prominent than on the LP. Other differences include significant changes to the overall ambiance and dynamic range. The 1995 CD reissue restored the full gatefold artwork.

A 2008 remaster of the original mix was used for a 2009 limited edition audiophile LP by Classic Records and for the 2012 Universal Music CD reissue. Zappa Records reissued the album in a 180 gram LP in 2016, remastered by Bernie Grundman. On 20 December 2019, Zappa Records released The Hot Rats Sessions, a 50th anniversary 6 CD box set of music recorded during the sessions for the album which included the no longer available 1987 mix and many previously unissued takes and mixes.

== Reception ==
Professional ratings
Review scores
Source	Rating
AllMusic	4.5/5 stars
Encyclopedia of Popular Music	5/5 stars
The Great Rock Bible	9/10
MusicHound Rock: The Essential Album Guide	4/5 stars
OndaRock	8/10
Record Collector	5/5 stars
The Rolling Stone Album Guide	4/5 stars
Tom Hull	B+
Uncut	9/10
The Village Voice	C

While it only climbed to number 173 on the Billboard 200, the album was a top ten hit in Britain and the Netherlands. Zappa later wrote that "for our beloved friends in the British Isles, it stands out as the only 'good' Zappa album ever released..."

Critical reception at the time was mixed. Lester Bangs of Rolling Stone wrote "This recording brings together a set of mostly little-known talents that whale the tar out of every other informal "jam" album released in rock and roll for the past two years. If Hot Rats is any indication of where Zappa is headed on his own, we are in for some fiendish rides indeed." Robert Christgau, by contrast, gave the album a "C" grade and stated "Doo-doo to you, Frank--when I want movie music I'll listen to Wonderwall." Chris Welch of Melody Maker, in an article titled "Hot Rats is Hot Stuff!", opined "Rats is a superb set of arrangements that feature the melodic writing of Zappa and the cream of contemporary rock musicianship."

Retrospectively, Steve Huey at AllMusic called it a "classic of the genre" and concludes that "Hot Rats still sizzles; few albums originating on the rock side of jazz-rock fusion flowed so freely between both sides of the equation, or achieved such unwavering excitement and energy." Uncut magazine similarly states that the album "is the ideal way-in for Zappa newcomers. An instantly likeable jazz-rock album, warm and uplifting..."

In the Q & Mojo Classic Special Edition Pink Floyd & The Story of Prog Rock, the album was number 13 in its list of "40 Cosmic Rock Albums". It was also included in the book 1001 Albums You Must Hear Before You Die. In 2000 it was voted number 123 in Colin Larkin's All Time Top 1000 Albums. Additionally, "Willie the Pimp" made number 75 on the Rolling Stone "100 Greatest Guitar Songs of All Time."

== Track listing ==
All tracks are written by Frank Zappa.

Side one
No.	Title	Length
1.	"Peaches en Regalia"	3:38
2.	"Willie the Pimp"	9:21
3.	"Son of Mr. Green Genes"	8:58
Total length:		21:57

Side two
No.	Title	Length
4.	"Little Umbrellas"	3:06
5.	"The Gumbo Variations"	12:53
6.	"It Must Be a Camel"	5:15
Total length:		21:14

1987 remixed CD version
No.	Title	Length
1.	"Peaches en Regalia"	3:37
2.	"Willie the Pimp"	9:16
3.	"Son of Mr. Green Genes"	8:58
4.	"Little Umbrellas"	3:04
5.	"The Gumbo Variations"	16:55
6.	"It Must Be a Camel"	5:15
Total length:		47:05

== Personnel ==
Credits are adapted from Hot Rats liner notes.

- Frank Zappa – guitar, octave bass, percussion
- Ian Underwood – piano, organus maximus, flute, all clarinets, all saxes

Also featuring

- Captain Beefheart – vocals on "Willie the Pimp"
- Max Bennett – bass on all tracks except "Peaches en Regalia"
- Shuggie Otis – bass on "Peaches en Regalia"
- John Guerin – drums on "Willie the Pimp", "Little Umbrellas" and "It Must Be a Camel"
- Paul Humphrey – drums on "Son of Mr. Green Genes" and "The Gumbo Variations"
- Ron Selico – drums on "Peaches en Regalia"
- Don "Sugarcane" Harris – violin on "Willie the Pimp" and "The Gumbo Variations"
- Jean-Luc Ponty – violin on "It Must Be a Camel"
- Lowell George – rhythm guitar (uncredited)

=== Production ===
- Frank Zappa – producer, arranger
- Dick Kunc – director of engineering
- Cliff Goldstein – engineer
- Jack Hunt – engineer
- Brian Ingoldsby – engineer
- Cal Schenkel – cover design, design
- John Williams – design

== Charts ==
Chart (1969–70)	Peak position
Australian Albums (Kent Music Report)	19
Dutch Albums (Album Top 100)	6
UK Albums (Official Charts)	9
US Billboard 200	173

Chart (2019–20)	Peak position
German Albums (Offizielle Top 100)	45
UK Rock & Metal Albums (Official Charts)	2
