= Cal Schenkel =

American artist

- Born: Calvin Schenkel; 27 January 1947 (age 79); Willow Grove, Pennsylvania, U.S.
- Known for: Graphic designer, illustrator, advertising illustrator, album cover designer, comics artist, animator for Frank Zappa.

Calvin "Cal" Schenkel (born January 27, 1947) is an American illustrator, graphic designer, animator and comics artist, specializing in album cover design.

He was the main graphic arts collaborator for rock musician Frank Zappa and was responsible for the design of many Zappa album covers. Schenkel's work is iconic and distinctive in style, a forerunner of punk art and the new wave era.

== Early life and education ==
Schenkel was born in Willow Grove, Pennsylvania, on January 27, 1947, and grew up in Oreland, Pennsylvania. He attended the Philadelphia College of Art, but withdrew after one semester and set out to build a career.

== Career ==
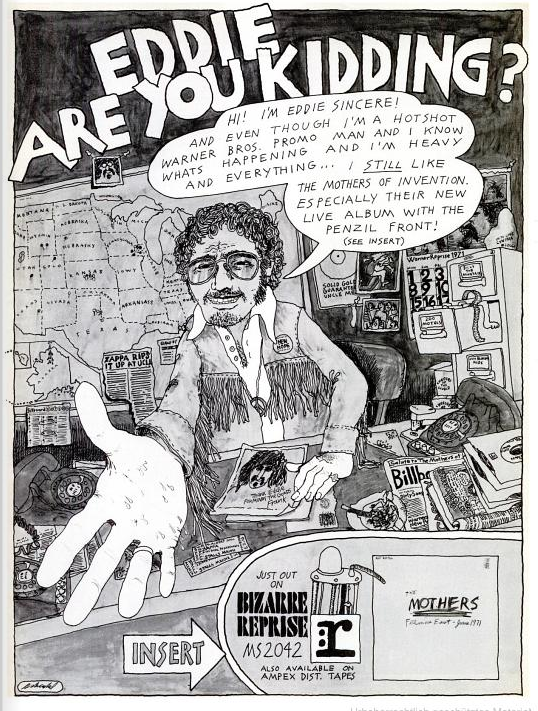
An advertisement for Fillmore East – June 1971, a live album by The Mothers of Invention, including Frank Zappa

In 1967, Schenkel relocated to New York City, where he was an unemployed artist. He was introduced to Frank Zappa by his then girlfriend, singer Sandy Hurvitz, later known as Essra Mohawk.

Schenkel's artwork, influenced at first by the comic strip Krazy Kat and by Mad magazine, developed its own "primitive" "ragged" surrealist style.

In 1976, Schenkel held an exhibition of his artwork in Greenfields Gallery at The Evergreen State College in Olympia, Washington. The exhibition also featured artwork by musician Don Van Vliet, better known as Captain Beefheart. Matt Groening, creator of The Simpsons, was an Evergreen student at the time and saw the exhibition.

Schenkel started working for Frank Zappa in 1967. Schenkel recalled:

"When I first met him [Zappa] in New York, the art studio was in his apartment — but that was only for a brief period. I didn't actually live there [as widely reported], but I would commute to work at his place. When we moved to LA . . . he had rented the log cabin, I had a wing of it. It was my living quarters and art studio, which I rented separately from them."

For over a decade, Schenkel, working in either an annex of the Zappa household or in his own studio, attempted to give visual form to Zappa's music while developing his own, distinctive style. "I love naïve and folk art, art that has an unfinished look. I don't like the polished for the most part. Now what that means or where it comes from I'm not sure. But I was probably influenced graphically by artists I saw in school. And of course there's the comic book look — like Krazy Kat. A part of it was just lack of skill, trying to take advantage of my own naivety. I'd really only had a semester of art school, so I hadn't evolved my style when I was doing all of this. It just comes natural, too."

The first large Zappa project he worked on was the cover for We're Only in It for the Money, a parody of the Beatles' album Sgt Pepper's Lonely Hearts Club Band. Schenkel built plaster figures, helped set up the staging for the photo (at Zappa's direction), and put together the collage of people in the background. Schenkel also made advertising comics published in comics magazines, which promoted Zappa's latest releases. Some of these comics have been made available in Michel Choquette's compilation book The Someday Funnies.

Schenkel worked on album covers for Straight Records, a label owned by Zappa and manager Herb Cohen. The records were by Lenny Bruce, Tom Waits, Tim Buckley and Captain Beefheart. For Trout Mask Replica Schenkel went to a local fish market to buy the carp head that he wanted to use on the album cover. He hollowed out the head leaving just the face, like a carnival mask.

Beefheart instinctively picked it up and held it to his face and sat for over two hours while Schenkel took photographs. Inside the mask the smell was choking and intense but the Captain was good-natured about the whole process. At one point Beefheart picked up a saxophone and started to play something "raw" through the mouth of the stinking fish. Schenkel has film of the carp playing sax. The artwork for Zappa's Burnt Weeny Sandwich was originally intended for an Eric Dolphy album.

Schenkel provided vocals for Zappa's album Lumpy Gravy and was production designer for the film 200 Motels. He created animations accompanying the song Dental Hygiene Dilemma/Does This Life Look Interesting To You? in the film. He can be seen in the Zappa movies Uncle Meat and Video From Hell. The inspiration and title for the track "For Calvin (And His Next Two Hitch-Hikers)" (from The Grand Wazoo) was from an incident as related by Schenkel to Zappa. When Zappa came to register his son Dweezil's name, the hospital refused the unusual name. Zappa instead used a list of friends' names that came to mind: Ian Donald Calvin (after Schenkel) Euclid.

By 1976, Zappa's output had slowed while he was in dispute with Cohen and Warner Bros. Records. Schenkel returned to Willow Grove hoping to jump-start an art career separate from Zappa and the record industry. There he began his own "mail order" art business. In the 1980s Schenkel resumed occasional work on Zappa projects.

In 2012, Schenkel appeared on the television program History Detectives. He was asked to comment on a re-discovered collage, made in the early 1960s. With the help of Schenkel and others, the piece was authenticated as an early Zappa artwork. Schenkel illustrated the cover to Howard Kaylan's autobiography My Life with the Turtles, Flo and Eddie, and Frank Zappa, etc..

== Covers designed by Schenkel ==
Frank Zappa and/or The Mothers Of Invention:

- Lumpy Gravy
- We're Only In It For The Money
- Cruising with Ruben & the Jets
- Uncle Meat
- Hot Rats
- Burnt Weeny Sandwich
- Fillmore East - June 1971
- Just Another Band from L.A.
- The Grand Wazoo
- One Size Fits All
- Tinseltown Rebellion
- Does Humor Belong in Music? (1995 re-issue)
- The Best Band You Never Heard in Your Life (1995 re-issue)
- Playground Psychotics
- Ahead of Their Time
- Cheap Thrills
- Mystery Disc
- Son of Cheep Thrills
- Threesome No. 1 and Threesome No. 2 (slipcase art)

Captain Beefheart:

- Trout Mask Replica

Fugs:

- Golden Filth

Tom Waits:

- Closing Time
- The Heart Of Saturday Night
- Nighthawks At The Diner

Sandy Hurvitz (Essra Mohawk):

- Sandy’s Album Is Here At Last
