= The Aynsley Dunbar Retaliation (album) =

Studio album by The Aynsley Dunbar Retaliation
- Released: July 1968
- Recorded: 1968
- Genre: Blues rock
- Length: 37:53
- Label: Liberty
- Producer: Ian Samwell

The Aynsley Dunbar Retaliation chronology
| The Aynsley Dunbar Retaliation (1968) | Doctor Dunbar's Prescription (1968) |

The Aynsley Dunbar Retaliation is the 1968 debut album by The Aynsley Dunbar Retaliation, a band assembled by drummer Aynsley Dunbar following stints in John Mayall & the Bluesbreakers and The Jeff Beck Group, for which he had attained acclaim and name recognition in hard rock and British blues. The album was released in 1968 in Canada, France, Sweden, the UK, and the US with a limited re-release the following year. The cover art was designed by Hipgnosis.

== Track listing ==
All titles published by Lupus Music except 'See See Baby' (Leeds Music) and 'Memory of Pain' (MCPS).

Side one
| No. | Title | Writer(s) | Length |
|---|---|---|---|
| 1. | "Watch 'n' Chain" | Victor Brox, Alex Dmochowski, Aynsley Dunbar, John Morshead | 2:38 |
| 2. | "My Whiskey Head Woman" | Victor Brox, Alex Dmochowski, Aynsley Dunbar, John Morshead | 4:26 |
| 3. | "Trouble No More" | Victor Brox, Alex Dmochowski, John Morshead | 2:57 |
| 4. | "Double Lovin'" | Victor Brox, John Morshead | 3:54 |
| 5. | "See See Baby" | Freddie King, Sonny Thompson | 2:23 |
| 6. | "Roamin' and Ramblin'" | Victor Brox | 3:02 |
| Total length: | | | 19:20 |

Side two
| No. | Title | Writer(s) | Length |
|---|---|---|---|
| 1. | "Sage of Sidney Street" | Aynsley Dunbar | 5:00 |
| 2. | "Memory of Pain" | Percy Mayfield | 6:08 |
| 3. | "Mutiny" | Aynsley Dunbar, John Morshead | 7:25 |
| Total length: | | | 18:33 |

== Personnel ==
The Aynsley Dunbar Retaliation

- Victor Brox - vocals, guitar, keyboard, horns
- John Morshead - lead guitar, vocals
- Alex Dmochowski - bass
- Aynsley Dunbar - drums

Technical

- Victor Gamm - engineer
