= Bob Harris (musician) =

American jazz musician (1943–2001)

- Born: Robert Maurice Harris; September 27, 1943; Los Angeles, California, U.S.
- Died: August 11, 2001 (aged 57)
- Occupation: Musician
- Spouse: Judee Sill

Robert Maurice Harris (September 27, 1943 – August 11, 2001) was an American jazz pianist, keyboardist, and arranger.

== Early life ==
Harris was born in September 1943 in Los Angeles, California, the son of Maurice Harris and Martha Pilar Arcos Harris. His father was a trumpet player in The Tonight Show Band led by Doc Severinsen. His maternal grandmother, Pilar Arcos, was a Cuban-born singer and actress from a family of performers.

== Career ==
Harris worked as a jazz pianist in clubs in the Los Angeles area. He wrote orchestral arrangements with Don Bagley for Judee Sill's debut album in 1971. He also played as a pianist for The Turtles. Harris later wrote arrangements for recordings by The Friends of Distinction and Jack Jones.

Harris joined jazz guitarist Gábor Szabó in 1970 and was a member of Frank Zappa's band The Mothers for a short time in 1971. He appeared on the Zappa album Fillmore East – June 1971. Recordings from the same concerts also appeared on The John Lennon / Yoko Ono album Sometime in New York City. He also appeared on the Zappa album Playground Psychotics where he was a soloist on the Wurlitzer electronic piano on the song Billy the Mountain.

At the end of the 1970s, Harris toured with Ray Charles.

== Personal life ==
In 1966 he married singer-songwriter Judee Sill. They divorced in 1972. Harris died in 2001 from the effects of a drug overdose, at age 57.

This Bob Harris should not be confused with the unrelated keyboard player, trumpeter, and singer Bob Harris who worked with Frank Zappa in 1980.

== Discography ==
- Friends of Distinction: Whatever 1970
- Judee Sill: Judee Sill 1971

With Frank Zappa and the Mothers of Invention

- Fillmore East - June 1971 (1971)
- You Can't Do That on Stage Anymore, Vol. 6 (1992)
- Playground Psychotics (1992)
- Finer Moments (2012)

With Plastic Ono Band

- Some Time in New York City (1972)
