= Playground Psychotics =

Live album by Frank Zappa/The Mothers of Invention
- Released: October 27, 1992
- Recorded: September 1970 – December 10, 1971
- Venue: Various locations, including: Fillmore East, New York City; Pauley Pavilion, UCLA; Rainbow Theater, London
- Genre: Progressive rock; art rock; comedy rock
- Length: 132:35
- Label: Barking Pumpkin
- Producer: Frank Zappa

Frank Zappa chronology
You Can't Do That on Stage Anymore, Vol. 6 (1992)	Playground Psychotics (1992)	Ahead of Their Time (1993)

The Mothers of Invention chronology
Bongo Fury (1975)	Playground Psychotics (1992)	Ahead of Their Time (1993)

Professional ratings
Review scores
Source	Rating
Allmusic	3/5 stars

Playground Psychotics is a two-CD live album by Frank Zappa and the Mothers of Invention. It was originally released in 1992 through his mail order label, Barking Pumpkin, and was re-released in 1995 through Rykodisc. The album features recordings of Zappa and his band, the Mothers of Invention, around the time of the film 200 Motels. The live material on Playground Psychotics is interspersed with excerpts from taped conversations among band members whilst on tour, and the release includes three conceptual sections: A Typical Day on the Road, Part 1, a collage of dialogue which opens the first disc; A Typical Day on the Road, Part 2, which opens the second disc and The True Story of 200 Motels, which appears at the end of disc two. The album also includes a live session with John Lennon and Yoko Ono, an alternate mix of which appears on Lennon and Ono's Some Time in New York City (1972).

== Track listing ==
All words & music are written by Frank Zappa, except where noted.

=== Disc one ===
A Typical Day on the Road, Part 1
No.	Title	Writer(s)	Length
1.	"'Here Comes the Gear, Lads'"	The Mothers of Invention	1:00
2.	"The Living Garbage Truck"	M.O.I.	1:20
3.	"A Typical Sound Check"	M.O.I.	1:19
4.	"'This Is Neat'"	M.O.I.	0:23
5.	"The Motel Lobby"	M.O.I.	1:21
6.	"Getting Stewed"	M.O.I.	0:55
7.	"The Motel Room"	M.O.I.	0:29
8.	"'Don't Take Me Down'"	M.O.I.	1:11
9.	"The Dressing Room"	M.O.I.	0:24
10.	"Learning "Penis Dimension""	M.O.I.	2:02
11.	"'You There, with the Hard On!'"	M.O.I.	0:25

No.	Title	Writer(s)	Length
12.	"Zanti Serenade"	music: Ian Underwood, Don Preston, Zappa	2:40
13.	"Divan"		1:46
14.	"Sleeping in a Jar"		1:30
15.	"'Don't Eat There'"		2:26
16.	"Brixton Still Life"		2:59
17.	"Super Grease"	words: M.O.I., music: Zappa	1:39
18.	"Wonderful Wino"	Jeff Simmons, Zappa	4:52
19.	"Sharleena"		4:23
20.	"Cruisin' for Burgers"		2:53
21.	"Diphtheria Blues"	M.O.I.	6:19
22.	"Well"	Walter Ward	4:43
23.	"Say Please"	John Lennon, Yoko Ono, Zappa	0:57
24.	"Aaawk"	Lennon, Ono, Zappa	2:59
25.	"Scum Bag"	Lennon, Ono, Howard Kaylan, Zappa	5:53
26.	"A Small Eternity with Yoko Ono"	Lennon, Ono	6:07

- An alternate mix of tracks 22 through 26, at times with different titles, appears on the John Lennon and Yoko Ono album Sometime in New York City.

=== Disc two ===
A Typical Day on the Road, Part 2
No.	Title	Writer(s)	Length
1.	"Beer Shampoo"	The Mothers of Invention	1:39
2.	"Champagne Lecture"	M.O.I.	4:29
3.	"Childish Perversions"	M.O.I.	1:31
4.	"Playground Psychotics"	M.O.I.	1:08
5.	"The Mudshark Interview"	M.O.I.	2:39
6.	"'There's No Lust in Jazz'"	M.O.I.	0:55
7.	"Botulism on the Hoof"	M.O.I.	0:47
8.	"You Got Your Armies"	M.O.I.	0:10
9.	"The Spew King"	M.O.I.	0:24
10.	"I'm Doomed"	M.O.I.	0:25

No.	Title	Writer(s)	Length
11.	"Status Back Baby"		2:49
12.	"The London Cab Tape"	words: M.O.I.	1:24
13.	"Concentration Moon, Part One"		1:20
14.	"The Sanzini Brothers"	Underwood, Mark Volman, Kaylan	1:33
15.	"'It's a Good Thing We Get Paid to Do This'"		2:45
16.	"Concentration Moon, Part Two"		2:04
17.	"Mom & Dad"		3:16
18.	"Intro to Music for Low Budget Orchestra"		1:32
19.	"Billy the Mountain"		30:25

The True Story of 200 Motels
No.	Title	Length
20.	"'He's Watching Us'"	1:21
21.	"If You're Not a Professional Actor"	0:23
22.	"He's Right"	0:14
23.	"Going for the Money"	0:12
24.	"Jeff Quits"	1:33
25.	"A Bunch of Adventures"	0:56
26.	"Martin Lickert's Story"	0:39
27.	"A Great Guy"	0:30
28.	"Bad Acting"	0:10
29.	"The Worst Reviews"	0:20
30.	"A Version of Himself"	1:02
31.	"I Could Be a Star Now"	0:36
Total length:		132:35

== Personnel ==
=== Musicians ===
Heard on the dialog portions

- Frank Zappa
- Mark Volman
- Howard Kaylan
- Jeff Simmons
- George Duke
- Ian Underwood
- Aynsley Dunbar
- Martin Lickert

Performing on the Pauley Pavilion & Rainbow Theater cuts

- Frank Zappa – lead guitar, vocal
- Mark Volman – vocal
- Howard Kaylan – vocal
- Jim Pons – bass, vocal
- Don Preston – keyboards, electronics
- Ian Underwood – keyboards, alto sax
- Aynsley Dunbar – drums

Performing on the Fillmore East cuts

- Frank Zappa – lead guitar, vocal
- Mark Volman – vocal
- Howard Kaylan – vocal
- Jim Pons – bass, vocal
- Bob Harris – Wurlitzer
- Ian Underwood – keyboards, alto sax
- Aynsley Dunbar – drums

Mentioned in the liner notes

- Bruce Bissell ("an industrious Reprise Records promo man") – arrangement for group photo ("The Living Garbage Truck")
- Dick Barber and Howard Kaylan – conversation ("The Motel Lobby")
- Aynsley Dunbar – keeping time on a bottle of Scotch whisky and a wooden table ("Diptheria Blues")
- Howard Kaylan – vocals ("Diptheria Blues")
- Martin Tickman ("the front office manager") – interviewee ("The Mudshark Interview")
- Mark Volman – cassette recording ("The London Cab Tape"), pieces of tape ("'It's a Good Thing We Get Paid to Do This'", "'He's Watching Us'", "He's Right", "Jeff Quits"), Uher
- Howard Kaylan, Jeff Simmons, Ian Underwood – planning for confrontation ("The London Cab Tape")
- Frank Zappa – Uher ("The London Cab Tape")

Uncredited

- John Lennon – vocals, guitar ("Well" through "A Small Eternity with Yoko Ono")
- Yoko Ono – vocals, bag ("Well" through "A Small Eternity with Yoko Ono")
- Roelof Kiers – heard on the dialog portions ("Martin Lickert's Story", "A Version of Himself")

=== Production ===
- Frank Zappa – most of the dialog recordings, producer, liner notes
- Spence Chrislu – remix engineer
- Cal Schenkel – art

Uncredited

- Mark Pinske – remix engineer
- Barry Keene – Fillmore East, Pauley Pavilion and Rainbow Theater recording engineer
- Bob Auger – Rainbow Theater recording engineer
