= Jim Pons =

American musician (born 1943)

- Pons in 1966

Background information
- Born: March 14, 1943 (age 83); Santa Monica, California, United States
- Origin: Los Angeles, California, United States
- Genres: Rock
- Occupation: Musician
- Instruments: Bass, vocals
- Years active: 1964–1973, 2000s–present
- Member of: Lonesome Ride
- Formerly of: The Leaves; The Turtles; The Mothers of Invention; Flo and Eddie
- Website: www.jimpons.com

Jim Pons (born March 14, 1943) is an American bassist, author, singer, and video director who most notably played for the Leaves (1964–1967), the Turtles (1967–1970), and the Mothers of Invention (1970–1971), and Flo & Eddie (1971–1973).

After leaving the music scene in 1973, he worked as a video director for the New York Jets, and briefly the Jacksonville Jaguars. Pons designed the Jets team logo that was used from 1978 to 1997.

== Early life ==
Pons was born in Santa Monica, California.

== The Leaves ==
In 1964, Pons formed the garage rock band The Leaves. The band was founded by Pons and guitarist Robert Lee Reiner, who were Fraternity students at Cal State Northridge (then known as San Fernando Valley State College).

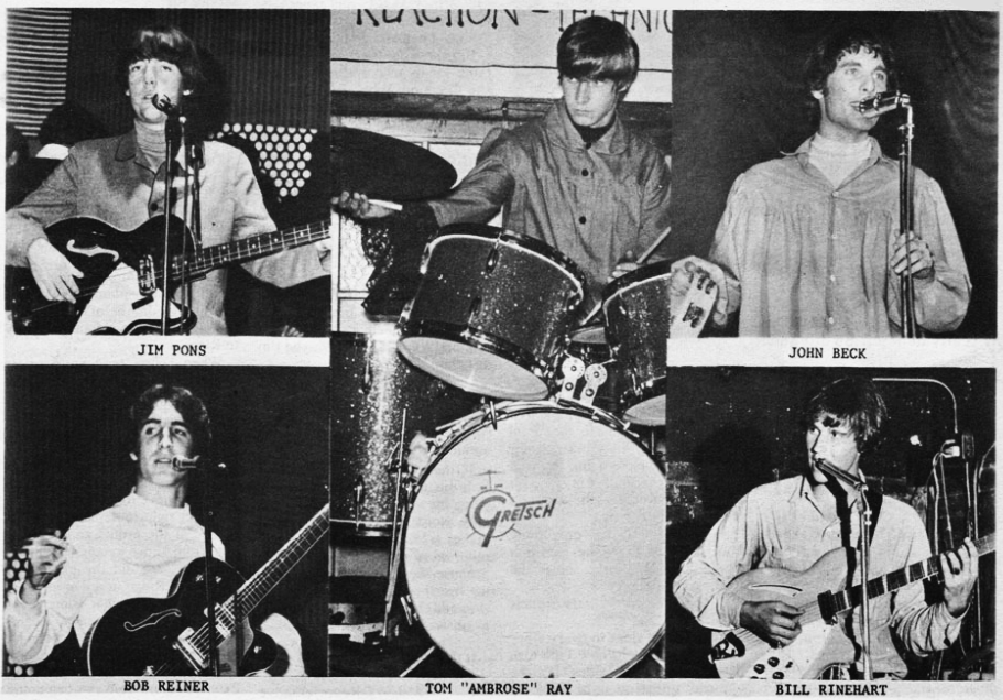
The Leaves in 1966. (Pons top left)

They were originally called The Rockwells, prior to changing their names to The Leaves. They acquired the name Leaves when one of the members greeted another by saying “What’s happening?”, and the other responding with “The Leaves are happening”.

The Leaves eventually secured a regular gig replacing the Byrds as the house band at the nightclub Ciro's on the Sunset Strip. They signed with Mira Records after being heard by Pat Boone, who got them the position.

The Leaves are noted for recording an early version of the song "Hey Joe", which they recorded along with their debut album in 1966. Their version of Hey Joe was #1 on the Los Angeles stations and peaked at #31 on the Billboard pop charts in May 1966. Pons stayed in the Leaves until 1967.

== The Turtles ==
Pons joined The Turtles shortly after the Leaves. He played bass on their hit songs She'd Rather Be With Me, Elenore, She's My Girl, and You Showed Me. As a member of the Turtles, he appeared on television on both of their appearances on The Ed Sullivan Show, The Smothers Brothers Comedy Hour, and American Bandstand. Pons continued to tour with the Turtles until they split in 1970.

Since the 2010s, he has occasionally guest-starred with The Turtles alongside Flo & Eddie.

== The Mothers Of Invention ==
Pons' Laurel Canyon neighbor was Frank Zappa.

"I had known Frank previous to my joining his band, so there was no formal audition. I was almost kind of like a friend of the family by then. I had known Gail Zappa before they were married."

Pons was a member of Frank Zappa’s Mothers of Invention (1970-1971). He played bass on their albums Fillmore East – June 1971, Just Another Band From L.A., and Playground Psychotics. Pons portrayed himself in Zappa's 1971 surrealist film 200 Motels, starring the members of the Mothers Of Invention.

== Plastic Ono Band ==
Pons performed with Plastic Ono Band with the Mothers of Invention on 6 June 1971 for the concert at the Fillmore East, later released as:

- for Plastic Ono Band on Some Time in New York City (1972) as Live Jam
- for Mothers of Invention on Playground Psychotics, and The Mothers 1971

== Video directing ==
In 1973, after a Flo and Eddie tour, Pons moved to New York, where he received a call from John Beck, formerly of The Leaves which led to Jim becoming the film and video director for the New York Jets football team. Pons designed the team's 1978–97 team logo. He held this position until around the year 2000.

Pons and his family moved to Jacksonville, Florida in 2005, where he did game day video for the Jacksonville Jaguars until he retired.

== Personal life ==
Pons plays a U-bass in a bluegrass band called Lonesome Ride in Jacksonville.

== Book ==
In 2017, Pons wrote an autobiography titled Hard Core Love: Sex, Football and Rock and Roll in the Kingdom of God which won the 2017 Florida Writers Association Book of the Year award. The book describes his spiritual journey during his careers in the music and sports industries.

== Discography ==
=== With The Leaves ===
==== Albums ====
- Hey Joe (1966)
- All The Good That's Happening (1967)
- The Leaves 1966 (1982)

==== Singles ====
- "Love Minus Zero" / "Too Many People"
- "Hey Joe, Where You Gonna Go" / "Be with You"
- "You Better Move On" / "A Different Story"
- "Be with You" / "Funny Little Word"
- "Hey Joe" / "Girl from the East"
- "Hey Joe" / "Funny Little World"
- "Too Many People" / "Girl from the East"
- "Get Out of My Life Woman" / "Girl from the East"
- "Be with You" / "You Better Move On"
- "Lemmon Princess" / "Twilight Sanctuary"

=== With The Turtles ===
==== Studio albums ====
Year	Album	Label
1968	The Turtles Present the Battle of the Bands	White Whale
1969	Turtle Soup	White Whale

==== Singles ====
Year	Title (A-side / B-side) Both sides from same album except where indicated	Album	Label
1967	"She'd Rather Be with Me" / "The Walking Song"	Happy Together	White Whale
1967	"Guide for the Married Man" / "Think I'll Run Away"	Happy Together	White Whale
1967	"You Know What I Mean" / "Rugs of Woods & Flowers" (from Happy Together)	Golden Hits	White Whale
1967	"She's My Girl" / "Chicken Little Was Right" (Non-LP track. A re-recording of this song later appeared on The Turtles Present the Battle of the Bands)	More Golden Hits	White Whale
1968	"Sound Asleep" / "Umbassa the Dragon" (Non-LP track)	More Golden Hits	White Whale
1968	"The Story of Rock and Roll" / "Can You Hear the Cows" (Non-LP track)	More Golden Hits	White Whale
1968	"Elenore" / "Surfer Dan"	The Turtles Present the Battle of the Bands	White Whale
1969	"You Showed Me" / "Buzzsaw"	The Turtles Present the Battle of the Bands	White Whale
1969	"House on the Hill" / "Come Over"	Turtle Soup	White Whale
1969	"You Don't Have to Walk in the Rain" / "Come Over"	Turtle Soup	White Whale
1969	"Love in the City" / "Bachelor Mother"	Turtle Soup	White Whale
1969	"Lady-O" / "Somewhere Friday Night" (From "Turtle Soup")	More Golden Hits	White Whale
1970	"Teardrops" / "Gas Money"	Non-LP track (released under the alias: "The Dedications")	White Whale
1970	"Who Would Ever Think That I Would Marry Margaret?" / "We Ain't Gonna Party No More"	More Golden Hits	White Whale
1970	"Is It Any Wonder?" / "Wanderin' Kind" (from Wooden Head)	Golden Hits	White Whale
1970	"Eve of Destruction" / "Wanderin' Kind" (from Wooden Head)	It Ain't Me, Babe	White Whale
1970	"Me About You" / "Think I'll Run Away"	Happy Together	White Whale

=== With The Mothers of Invention ===
==== Studio albums ====
Title	Year
Fillmore East – June 1971 (with The Mothers of Invention)	1971
200 Motels (with The Mothers of Invention)	1971
Just Another Band From L.A. (with The Mothers of Invention)	1972

==== Singles ====
Single (A-side, B-side) Both sides from same album except where indicated	Album	Year
"Tears Began to Fall" (single mix and edit) b/w "Junier Mintz Boogie" (non-album track)	Fillmore East – June 1971	1971

== Filmography ==
- 200 Motels (1971) — himself (uncredited)

== Bibliography ==
- Hard Core Love: Sex, Football and Rock and Roll in the Kingdom of God (2017)
