= The Hot Rats Sessions =

Box set by Frank Zappa
- Released: December 20, 2019
- Recorded: 1961–1964; 1969
- Genres: Jazz-fusion; progressive rock; instrumental rock
- Length: 438:55
- Label: Zappa Records

Frank Zappa chronology
Halloween 73 (2019)	The Hot Rats Sessions (2019)	The Mothers 1970 (2020)

The Hot Rats Sessions is a 6-CD box set celebrating the 50th anniversary of the Frank Zappa album Hot Rats. It was released on December 20, 2019.

== Content ==
The first four discs contain recordings from during the making of the album. Disc five contains the 1987 digital remix of the album, which was the only version available on CD before the 2012 re-release. The album also contains extended versions of many tracks from this period, such as "The Gumbo Variations" (here titled "Big Legs"), a section of "Little House I Used to Live in" (here titled "Another Waltz"), and the first half of "Toads of the Short Forest" (here titled "Arabesque"). The rest of disc five and disc six consist of extras such as outtakes, radio ads, and track mixes. It also features an excerpt of an interview explaining the origin of the album title and further excerpts from an interview of Zappa explaining the character of Willie the Pimp: a part of this interview was featured on the posthumous album Mystery Disc.

== Reception ==
Professional ratings
Review scores
Source	Rating
Mojo	4/5 stars
Rolling Stone	4/5 stars

Writing for Rolling Stone, Kory Grow enjoyed the album but thought that it was flawed, stating that while it was a very interesting listen for those curious about the making of the album, it could feel like overkill at certain times.

== Track listing ==
Disc one
No.	Title	Length
1.	"Piano Music (Section 1)"	2:13
2.	"Piano Music (Section 3)"	5:42
3.	"Peaches en Regalia (Prototype)"	5:57
4.	"Peaches en Regalia (Section 1, In session)"	10:49
5.	"Peaches en Regalia (Section 1, Master Take)"	2:05
6.	"Peaches Jam - Part 1"	6:28
7.	"Peaches Jam - Part 2"	10:30
8.	"Peaches en Regalia (Section 3, In Session)"	6:57
9.	"Peaches en Regalia (Section 3, Master Take)"	2:07
10.	"Arabesque (In Session)"	7:01
11.	"Arabesque (Master Take)"	6:57
12.	"Dame Margret's Son to Be a Bride (In Session)"	4:30

Disc two
No.	Title	Length
1.	"It Must Be a Camel (Part 1, In Session)"	8:22
2.	"It Must Be a Camel (Part 1, Master Take)"	2:17
3.	"It Must Be a Camel (Intercut, In Session)"	3:53
4.	"It Must Be a Camel (Intercut, Master Take)"	4:02
5.	"Natasha (In Session)"	4:04
6.	"Natasha (Master Take)"	3:12
7.	"Bognor Regis (Unedited Master)"	10:59
8.	"Willie the Pimp (In Session)"	2:20
9.	"Willie the Pimp (Unedited Master Take)"	15:14
10.	"Willie the Pimp (Guitar OD 1)"	14:46
11.	"Willie the Pimp (Guitar OD 2)"	6:18

Disc three
No.	Title	Length
1.	"Transition (Section 1, In Session)"	6:17
2.	"Transition (Section 1, Master Take)"	2:25
3.	"Transition (Section 2, Intercut, In Session)"	1:50
4.	"Transition (Section 2, Intercut, Master Take)"	2:43
5.	"Transition (Section 3, Intercut, In Session)"	2:29
6.	"Transition (Section 3, Intercut, Master Take)"	2:13
7.	"Lil' Clanton Shuffle (Unedited Master)"	12:46
8.	"Directly from My Heart to You (Unedited Master)"	10:18
9.	"Another Waltz (Unedited Master)"	27:56

Disc four
No.	Title	Length
1.	"Dame Margaret's Son to Be a Bride (Remake)"	3:54
2.	"Son of Mr. Green Genes (Take 1)"	8:16
3.	"Son of Mr. Green Genes (Master Take)"	10:47
4.	"Big Legs (Unedited Master Take)"	32:42
5.	"It Must Be a Camel (Percussion Tracks)"	1:48
6.	"Arabesque (Guitar OD Mix)"	6:57
7.	"Transition (Full Version)"	6:22
8.	"Piano Music (Section 3, OD Version)"	5:41

Disc five
No.	Title	Length
1.	"Peaches en Regalia (1987 Digital Re-Mix)"	3:39
2.	"Willie the Pimp (1987 Digital Re-Mix) (23751)"	9:17
3.	"Son of Mr. Green Genes (1987 Digital Re-Mix)"	9:00
4.	"Little Umbrellas (1987 Digital Re-Mix)"	3:04
5.	"The Gumbo Variations (1987 Digital Re-Mix)"	16:57
6.	"It Must Be a Camel (1987 Digital Re-Mix)"	5:15
7.	"The Origin of Hot Rats"	0:35
8.	"Hot Rats Vintage Promotion Ad #1"	1:02
9.	"Peaches en Regalia (1969 Mono Single Master)"	3:52
10.	"Hot Rats Vintage Promotion Ad #2"	1:01
11.	"Little Umbrellas (1969 Mono Single Master)"	3:05
12.	"Lil' Clanton Shuffle (1972 Whitney Studios Mix)"	12:42

Disc six
No.	Title	Length
1.	"Little Umbrellas (Cucamonga Version)"	2:00
2.	"Little Umbrellas (1969 Mix Outtake)"	3:10
3.	"It Must Be a Camel (1969 Mix Outtake)"	5:23
4.	"Son of Mr. Green Genes (1969 Mix Outtake)"	10:39
5.	"More of the Story of Willie the Pimp"	1:24
6.	"Willie the Pimp (Vocal Tracks)"	2:07
7.	"Willie the Pimp (1969 Quick Mix)"	14:29
8.	"Dame Margaret's Son to Be a Bride (1969 Quick Mix)"	3:46
9.	"Hot Rats Vintage Promotion Ad #3"	0:52
10.	"Bognor Regis (1970 Record Plant Mix)"	8:11
11.	"Peaches en Regalia (1969 Rhythm Track Mix)"	4:24
12.	"Son of Mr. Green Genes (1969 Rhythm Track Mix)"	10:40
13.	"Little Umbrellas (1969 Rhythm Track Mix)"	3:11
14.	"Arabesque (Guitar Tracks)"	6:57
15.	"Hot Rats Vintage Promotion Ad #4"	0:59
