= Just Another Band from L.A. =

- original issue cover

Live album by The Mothers of Invention
- Released: March 26, 1972
- Recorded: August 7, 1971
- Venue: Pauley Pavilion at UCLA (Los Angeles, CA)
- Genre: Comedy rock; progressive rock
- Length: 45:18
- Label: Bizarre/Reprise
- Producer: Frank Zappa

Frank Zappa chronology
200 Motels (1971)	Just Another Band from L.A. (1972)	Waka/Jawaka (1972)

The Mothers of Invention chronology
Fillmore East – June 1971 (1971)	Just Another Band from L.A. (1972)	The Grand Wazoo (1972)

Just Another Band from L.A. is a live album by The Mothers, released in 1972. It was recorded live on August 7, 1971, in Pauley Pavilion on the campus of UCLA in Los Angeles. Included on the album is "Billy the Mountain", Frank Zappa's long, narrative parody of rock operas.

Originally planned for release as a double LP with solos from "Studebaker Hoch" and "The Subcutaneous Peril" taking up most of the second LP in addition to parts of "Billy the Mountain". The song "Eddie, Are You Kidding?" refers to Edward Nalbandian, while album outtake "The Subcutaneous Peril" later appeared in edited form on Finer Moments (2012).

The album was reissued on CD with badly flawed mastering and no composition credits by Rykodisc in 1990 and repackaged with the same audio but with the composition credits restored in 1995. In 2012 Universal/UMe issued a properly remastered edition on CD.

== Reception ==
Professional ratings
Review scores
Source	Rating
Allmusic	3/5 stars
Christgau's Record Guide	C

== Track listing ==
All tracks are written by Frank Zappa.

Side one
No.	Title	Length
1.	"Billy the Mountain" (Interpolates sections of "Johnny's Theme" by Paul Anka and Johnny Carson, and of "Suite: Judy Blue Eyes" by Stephen Stills.)	24:47
Total length:		24:47

Side two
No.	Title	Length
2.	"Call Any Vegetable"	7:22
3.	"Eddie, Are You Kidding?" (John Seiter, Mark Volman, Howard Kaylan, Zappa)	3:10
4.	"Magdalena" (Kaylan, Zappa)	6:24
5.	"Dog Breath"	3:39
Total length:		20:46

== Personnel ==
- Frank Zappa – guitar, vocals
- Don Preston – keyboards, Minimoog
- Ian Underwood – woodwinds, keyboards, vocals
- Aynsley Dunbar – drums
- Howard Kaylan – lead vocals
- Mark Volman – lead vocals
- Jim Pons – bass guitar, vocals

== Charts ==
Chart (1972)	Peak position
Australia (Kent Music Report)	41
Billboard 200	85
