= Bizarre Records =

American record label formed by Frank Zappa and Herb Cohen

- Founded: 1967
- Founder: Frank Zappa

Bizarre Records, self-identified simply as Bizarre, was a production company and record label formed for artists discovered by rock musician Frank Zappa and his business partner/manager Herb Cohen.

== History ==
Bizarre was originally formed as a production company. In 1967 Zappa's label, Verve Records, missed the deadline to renew their option on Zappa's recording contract after his second album, Absolutely Free, recorded with his group the Mothers of Invention. This gave Zappa and Cohen the upper hand in negotiating their own production deal with Verve. The purpose of forming his own production company was to give Zappa complete creative control over his work and the works he planned to produce for others.

The first albums associated with Bizarre were released in early 1968. These included We're Only in It for the Money by the Mothers of Invention and Lumpy Gravy, Zappa's first solo album. Other Zappa-related releases were Cruising with Ruben & the Jets (1968) and the compilation album Mothermania (1969). The company also produced the late 1968 release Sandy's Album Is Here at Last by singer-songwriter Sandra Hurvitz, now better known as Essra Mohawk. These albums were all released by Verve Records with the Bizarre logo added to the label.

In early 1969 Bizarre was established as a record label distributed by the Warner Bros. Records family of labels, which also included Reprise Records. The Bizarre label was formed at the same time as a companion label, Straight Records, also distributed by Warner Bros. When the Bizarre and Straight labels were created, Zappa's intention was to release albums by avant-garde artists on Bizarre, and recordings by more mainstream artists on Straight. The first release in this series was a double album, The Berkeley Concert, by Lenny Bruce. Early US pressings on Bizarre used a distinctive blue label design. Bizarre also released the double album debut of Wild Man Fischer, titled An Evening with Wild Man Fischer, in early 1969.

However, the original Bizarre concept failed to work out as expected due to issues with distribution and management. This led to some very unusual albums on the Straight label especially those by Captain Beefheart, Alice Cooper and the GTOs. Zappa and the Mothers of Invention were the only artists who stayed with Bizarre. Zappa released eight of his own albums with and without the Mothers of Invention on Bizarre from 1969 to 1972. The only Zappa project not on Bizarre during this period was the 200 Motels film soundtrack album, released by United Artists Records in 1971.

By 1973 the original Bizarre and Straight distribution contracts with Warner ended. Many Bizarre and Straight recordings were re-issued by Warner and/or Reprise. Re-issues in the 1970s featured an orange Reprise Records label sometimes with a Bizarre logo. The same year Zappa and Cohen chose to launch a new company, DiscReet Records, once again distributed by Warner Bros. The Zappa/Mothers titles on Bizarre were available on Reprise until 1981. The back catalog was remastered (some remixed and expanded) by Zappa and leased to Rykodisc for reissue between 1987 and 1993. After Zappa's death in 1993, his widow Gail Zappa's relationship with Ryko soured and she eventually struck a deal with Universal Music Enterprises in 2012 to yet again re-issue the entire back-catalog the following year.

In 1988, Cohen licensed (from Warner Bros.) several of the albums that had been released on Bizarre and Straight and released them through Enigma Retro, including albums by Tim Buckley, Alice Cooper, and Beefheart, and called the label "Bizarre/Straight Records". Bizarre/Straight also released Lenny Bruce's The Berkeley Concert on CD and cassette. After Enigma went out of business in 1991, the label moved to Rhino Records for several years. Several of the albums that had been released on Bizarre/Straight eventually were re-released on Manifesto Records, established in 1995 and run by Evan Cohen, who is Herb Cohen's nephew. An Evening with Wild Man Fischer was finally released on CD in March 2016.

On April 1, 2018, Frank Zappa's official Facebook presence announced an impending reissue of Captain Beefheart and his Magic Band's Trout Mask Replica (originally a Straight release), in a deluxe package released by Third Man Records. The press release also mentioned the impending relaunch of the Bizarre imprint, but no further information is currently available on said relaunch.

== Discography ==
=== Albums ===
- Sandy Hurvitz – Sandy's Album Is Here at Last - December 9, 1968 - V6-5064
- Lenny Bruce – The Berkeley Concert - February 17, 1969 - 2XS-6329(1)
- The Mothers of Invention – Mothermania: The Best of The Mothers - March 24, 1969 - V6-5068
- The Mothers of Invention – Uncle Meat - April 21, 1969 - 2MS-2024(2)
- Wild Man Fischer – An Evening with Wild Man Fischer - April 28, 1969 - 2XS-6332(1)
- Frank Zappa – Hot Rats - October 15, 1969 - RS-6356(1)
- Various – Zappéd - November 10, 1969; February 3, 1970 - PRO368
- The Mothers of Invention – Burnt Weeny Sandwich - February 9, 1970 - RS-6370(1)
- The Mothers of Invention – Weasels Ripped My Flesh - August 10, 1970 - MS-2028(2)
- Frank Zappa – Chunga's Revenge - October 23, 1970 - MS-2030(2)
- The Mothers of Invention – Fillmore East – June 1971 - August 2, 1971 - MS-2042(2)
- The Mothers of Invention – Just Another Band from L.A. - March 26, 1972 - MS-2075(2)
- Frank Zappa – Waka/Jawaka - July 5, 1972 - MS-2094(2)
- The Mothers – The Grand Wazoo - November 27, 1972 - MS-2093(2)

(1): Reprise Records 2000 Series Numbering

(2): Reprise Records 6000 Series Numbering

=== Singles ===
- Wild Man Fischer – The Circle/Merry-Go-Round (7" single) - September 10, 1968 - 0781
- The Mothers of Invention – My Guitar/Dog Breath (7" single) - September 1, 1969 - 0840
- The Mothers of Invention – WPLJ/My Guitar (7" single) - February 23, 1970 - 0892
- Frank Zappa – Tell Me You Love Me/Will You Go All The Way for the U.S.A.? (7" single) - November 9, 1970 - 0967
- The Mothers – Tears Began To Fall/Junier Mintz Boogie (7" single) - October 20, 1971 - 1052
- The Mothers – Cletus Awreetus-Awrightus/Eat That Question (7" single) - November 6, 1972 - REP1127

== List of Bizarre Records artists ==
- Frank Zappa
- The Mothers of Invention
- Wild Man Fischer
- Lenny Bruce
- Sandy Hurvitz

== See also ==
- List of record labels
