= 200 Motels =

1971 American-British musical surrealist film

- Promotional release poster
- Directed by: Frank Zappa; Tony Palmer
- Written by: Frank Zappa; Tony Palmer
- Produced by: Herb Cohen; Jerry D. Good
- Starring: The Mothers of Invention; Theodore Bikel; Ringo Starr; Keith Moon
- Music by: Frank Zappa
- Production companies: Murakami-Wolf-Swenson; Bizarre Productions
- Distributed by: United Artists
- Release date: October 29, 1971 (Beverly Hills)
- Running time: 98 minutes
- Countries: United States; United Kingdom
- Language: English
- Budget: $679,000
- Box office: Under $1 million

200 Motels is a 1971 surrealist musical film written and directed by Frank Zappa and Tony Palmer, and featuring music by Zappa. An international co-production of United States and the United Kingdom, the film stars the Mothers of Invention, Theodore Bikel, Keith Moon and Ringo Starr.

A soundtrack album was released in the same year, with a slightly different selection of music.

== Plot ==
The film attempts to portray the craziness of life on the road as a rock musician, and as such consists of a series of unconnected nonsense vignettes interspersed with concert footage of the Mothers of Invention. Ostensibly, while on tour The Mothers of Invention go crazy in the small fictional town of Centerville ("a real nice place to raise your kids up"), wander around, and get beaten up in "Redneck Eats", a cowboy bar. In an animated interlude passed off as a "dental hygiene movie", bassist "Jeff", tired of playing what he refers to as "Zappa's comedy music", is persuaded by his bad conscience to quit the group, as did his real-life counterpart Jeff Simmons. Simmons was replaced by Martin Lickert (who was Starr's chauffeur) for the film. Almost every scene is drenched with video special effects (double and triple exposures, solarisation, false color, speed changes, etc.) which were innovative in 1971. The film has been dubbed a "surrealistic documentary".

== Cast ==
- Frank Zappa as himself
- The Mothers of Invention as themselves
- Theodore Bikel as Rance Muhammitz, the narrator/Master of Ceremonies (possibly the devil himself (or herself), he "is known by many names")
- Ringo Starr as Larry the Dwarf, dressed as Frank Zappa
- Keith Moon as the hot nun
- Howard Kaylan as himself
- Mark Volman as himself
- Ian Underwood as himself
- Ruth Underwood as herself
- Don Preston as himself
- Jimmy Carl Black as Lonesome Cowboy Burt
- Euclid James 'Motorhead' Sherwood as himself (uncredited)
- Aynsley Dunbar as himself
- George Duke as himself
- Jim Pons as himself (uncredited)
- Pamela Des Barres as the interviewer
- Martin Lickert as Jeff
- Janet Neville-Ferguson as Groupie #1
- Lucy Offerall as Groupie #2
- Dick Barber as Chunga – The Vacuum Cleaner
- Judy Gridley as the chorus leader
- Royal Philharmonic Orchestra as the bewildered orchestra

== Production ==
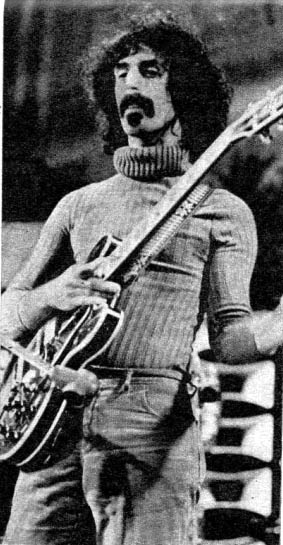
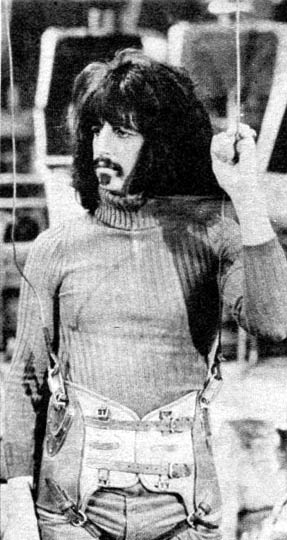
Frank Zappa (left) and Ringo Starr in the movie

Principal scenes of 200 Motels, including the Royal Philharmonic Orchestra, were filmed in a week at Pinewood Studios outside London, and featured The Mothers of Invention, The Royal Philharmonic Orchestra, Ringo Starr, Theodore Bikel, and Keith Moon. Tensions between Zappa and several cast and crew members arose before and during shooting. However, director Tony Palmer (on his 2009 reissue of 200 Motels) claims that all elements of the script derived from Zappa's trunk's worth of material were completed during production. It was the first feature film photographed on videotape and transferred to 35 mm film, a process that allowed for novel visual effects.

== Release and reception ==
United Artists' press kit for the film stated "For the audience that already knows and appreciates THE MOTHERS, [it] will provide a logical extension of our concerts and recordings." The film premiere was shown at Doheny Plaza Theater in Hollywood, California to mixed reviews. 200 Motels currently holds a 50% rating on Rotten Tomatoes based on eight reviews. Roger Ebert gave the film three stars out of four, saying that the film; "is a joyous, fanatic, slightly weird experiment in the uses of the color videotape process", and also stating; "It assaults the mind with everything on hand".

== Soundtrack ==
The soundtrack to 200 Motels was released by United Artists Records on October 4, 1971, and features a combination of rock and jazz songs, orchestral music and comedic spoken dialogue. The rock and comedy songs "Mystery Roach", "Lonesome Cowboy Burt", "Daddy, Daddy, Daddy", "What Will This Evening Bring Me This Morning" and "Magic Fingers", and the finale "Strictly Genteel", which mixes orchestral and rock elements, were noted as highlights of the album by reviewer Richie Unterberger.

The score relied extensively on orchestral music, and Zappa's dissatisfaction with the classical music world intensified when a concert, scheduled at the Royal Albert Hall after filming, was canceled because a representative of the venue found some of the lyrics obscene. In 1975, he lost a lawsuit against the Royal Albert Hall for breach of contract. When "Penis Dimension" was played to the judge, Mr Justice Mocatta, he responded "Have I got to listen to this?" The UK première was not until 29 October 2013, almost 20 years after Zappa's death.

The album was not released on compact disc until 1997, as a result of a licensing deal between Rykodisc (at the time the licensee for all of Zappa's other albums from the Zappa Family Trust (ZFT), numbering over 60 titles) and MGM allowing them to re-release numerous rare movie-musical soundtracks on CD. With the addition of this title, Ryko was finally able to offer the complete catalog of official Zappa recordings, as numerous legal proceedings both during Zappa's lifetime and afterwards failed to cede ownership of the rights and tapes to ZFT. That 2-CD edition, now out of print, contained extensive liner notes and artwork as well as a small poster for the film, as well as bonus tracks consisting of radio promos for the film and the single edit of the song "Magic Fingers".

Though many Zappa fans consider this album a key recording of the period, it was deemed by some music critics to be a peripheral album. AllMusic's Richie Unterberger critiqued what he referred to as the "growing tendency to deploy the smutty, cheap humor that would soon dominate much of Zappa's work", but said that "Those who like his late-'60s/early-'70s work [...] will probably like this fine".

== Legacy ==
After 200 Motels, the band went on tour; the live album Just Another Band From L.A. included the 20-minute track "Billy the Mountain", Zappa's satire on rock opera set in Southern California. This track was representative of the band's theatrical performances in which songs were used to build up sketches based on 200 Motels scenes as well as new situations often portraying the band members' sexual encounters on the road.

A show was produced in 2018 in France (Festival Musica Strasbourg and Philharmonie de Paris), staged by Antoine Gindt and conducted by Léo Warynski. This production was revivaled in Opéra de Nice in December 2023.

== See also ==
- List of American films of 1971
- List of films featuring hallucinogens
