= Aynsley Dunbar =

English drummer (born 1946)

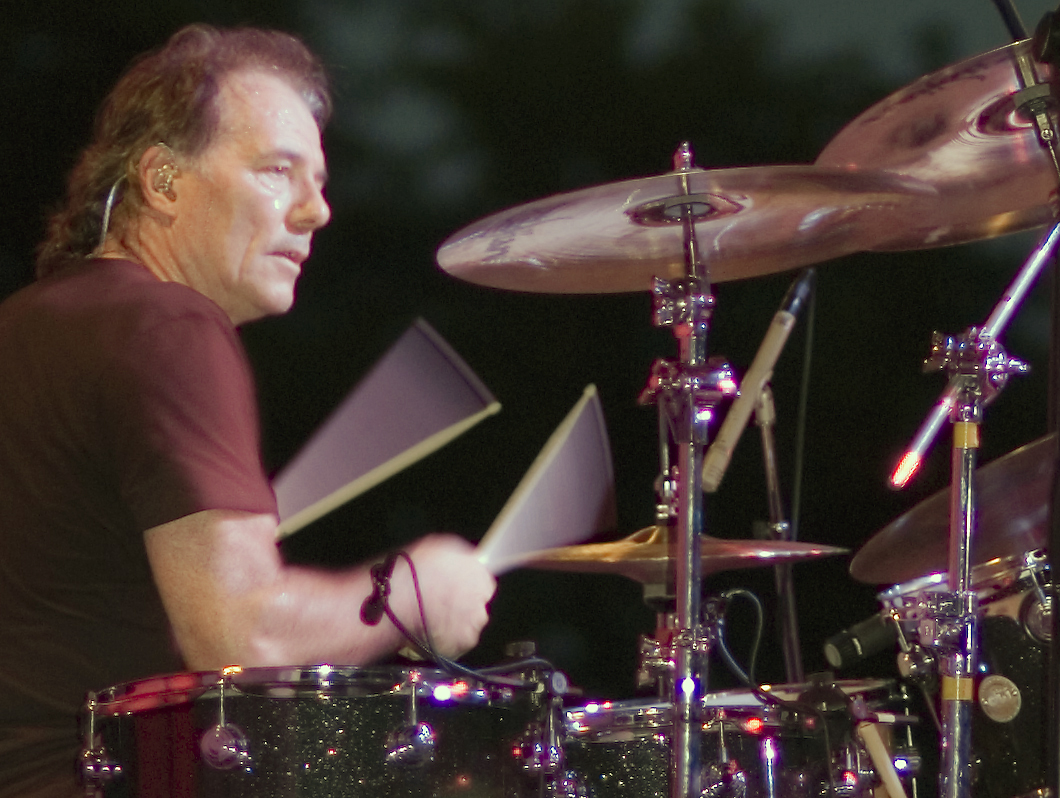
- Dunbar performing in 2007

Background information
- Born: Aynsley Thomas Dunbar; 10 January 1946 (age 80); Liverpool, England
- Genres: Rock; jazz; blues; heavy metal; glam metal; AOR
- Occupations: Drummer
- Years active: 1963–present
- Member of: World Classic Rockers
- Formerly of: The Jeff Beck Group; David Bowie band; Frank Zappa band; the Mothers of Invention; UFO; Whitesnake; Journey; Jefferson Starship; John Mayall & the Bluesbreakers; The Mojos

Aynsley Thomas Dunbar (born 10 January 1946) is an English drummer. Throughout his career, he worked with numerous major rock musicians and bands. Dunbar was inducted into the Rock and Roll Hall of Fame as a member of Journey in 2017.

== Career ==
Aynsley Thomas Dunbar was born in Liverpool, England. He started his professional career in Derry Wilkie and the Pressmen in 1963. In 1964, he joined the Excheckers. Then in December 1964, he joined the Merseybeat group the Mojos, who were renamed Stu James & the Mojos, with original members vocalist Stu James, guitarist Nick Crouch, and bass player Lewis Collins (later an actor in The Professionals). This line-up continued until 1966. Dunbar then auditioned for the Jimi Hendrix Experience, losing to Mitch Mitchell on a coin toss. Dunbar then joined John Mayall's Bluesbreakers replacing Hughie Flint. He stayed with Mayall until the spring of 1967 (playing on the A Hard Road album), and was replaced by Mick Fleetwood.

After a short stint in the Jeff Beck Group, Dunbar founded the Aynsley Dunbar Retaliation, so named to chide Mayall, who had fired him. They issued four albums during their existence. Dunbar co-wrote the song "Warning" (later recorded by Black Sabbath on their first album). The Dunbar single version was recorded in 1967 for the Blue Horizon label, prior to his band's first album release The Aynsley Dunbar Retaliation (1968).

Subsequently, Dunbar founded a short-lived progressive rock band called Blue Whale, which debuted with a tour of Scandinavia in January 1970. Following the recent collapse of the original lineup of King Crimson, Dunbar unsuccessfully tried to recruit Robert Fripp as Blue Whale's guitarist. Fripp, in turn, unsuccessfully tried to recruit Dunbar as King Crimson's new drummer. Blue Whale recorded one album, which featured Paul Williams (vocals), Ivan Zagni (guitar), Roger Sutton (guitar), Tommy Eyre (from Retaliation, keys) and Peter Friedberg (bass). Dunbar was subsequently the drummer for Frank Zappa, playing on the solo albums Apostrophe (') and Waka/Jawaka, and the Mothers' albums The Grand Wazoo, Fillmore East – June 1971, and Just Another Band from L.A., as well as the film 200 Motels. He filled in for Flo and Eddie when they left the Zappa group after an irate British "fan" pushed Zappa off the Rainbow stage in 1971. In 1974 he played on the soundtrack of Dirty Duck, an adult animated film directed by Charles Swenson. In the mid-1970s Dunbar played drums for former Grin leader Nils Lofgren, before joining the newly formed Journey on February 1, 1974. He remained a member until the end of the Infinity Tour on September 2, 1978, in Oakland, a period that encompassed Journey’s first four studio albums. Soon after, he joined Jefferson Starship for three albums. On 28 December 1978, he played at Winterland in San Francisco with the Tubes. Dunbar joined Whitesnake in 1985 and performed on their 1987 album Whitesnake. He also spent some time working with Pat Travers, Eric Burdon, UFO, Michael Schenker, Mogg/Way and the Animals.

He has been the drummer for the World Classic Rockers since 2003. In 2005, he drummed on Jake E. Lee's solo Retraced album.

In 2008, Dunbar recorded an album of material for Direct Music with Mickey Thomas of Starship, and musicians such as Jake E. Lee, former guitarist for Ozzy Osbourne. The complete recordings of Dunbar's drumming with Frank Zappa at Carnegie Hall in October 1971 were released exactly 40 years after the event in a four-CD set.

In 2009, the blues album The Bluesmasters featuring Mickey Thomas was released, featuring Dunbar on drums along with Tim Tucker on guitar and Danny Miranda on bass, as well as guest stars such as Magic Slim on guitar and vocals.

Drummerworld recognized Dunbar as the only drummer to have played with such a robust variety of successful bands and musicians. In 2017 Aynsley was inducted into the Rock and Roll Hall of Fame as a member of Journey. Dunbar was ranked by Rolling Stone as 27th greatest drummer of all time.

== Personal life ==
Dunbar's youngest son Dash was diagnosed with cancer in June 1999 and died on 9 May 2000.

== Discography ==
=== With John Mayall & the Bluesbreakers ===
- A Hard Road (1967)
- Looking Back (1969)
- So Many Roads (1969)
- Thru the Years (1971)

=== With Eddie Boyd ===
- Eddie Boyd and His Blues Band Featuring Peter Green (1967)

=== With Michael Chapman ===
- Rainmaker (1969)

=== The Aynsley Dunbar Retaliation ===
- The Aynsley Dunbar Retaliation (July 1968)
- Doctor Dunbar's Prescription (December 1968)
- To Mum, From Aynsley & The Boys (October 1969)
- Remains to Be Heard (May 1970)

=== With Blue Whale ===
- Blue Whale (1971)

=== With Frank Zappa and the Mothers ===
- Chunga's Revenge (1970)
- Fillmore East - June 1971 (1971)
- 200 Motels (1971)
- Just Another Band from L.A. (1972)
- Waka/Jawaka (1972)
- The Grand Wazoo (1972)
- Apostrophe (') (1974)
- You Can't Do That on Stage Anymore, Vol. 1 (1988)
- You Can't Do That on Stage Anymore, Vol. 3 (1989)
- You Can't Do That on Stage Anymore, Vol. 6 (1992)
- Playground Psychotics (1992)
- The Lost Episodes (1996)
- Quaudiophiliac (2004)
- Carnegie Hall (2011)
- Finer Moments (2012)
- Road Tapes, Venue 3 (2016)
- The Mothers 1970 (2020)
- Zappa - Original Motion Picture Soundtrack (2021)
- Funky Nothingness (2023)

=== With Shuggie Otis ===
- Freedom Flight (1971)

=== With Flo & Eddie ===
- The Phlorescent Leech & Eddie (1972)
- Flo & Eddie (1973)

=== With David Bowie ===
- Pin Ups (1973)
- Diamond Dogs (1974)

=== With Lou Reed ===
- Berlin (1973)

=== With Herbie Mann ===
- London Underground (Atlantic, 1973)

=== With Ava Cherry and the Astronettes ===
- People from Bad Homes (1973)

=== With Kathi McDonald ===
- Insane Asylum (1974)

=== With Mick Ronson ===
- Slaughter on 10th Avenue (1974)
- Play Don't Worry (1975)

=== With Nils Lofgren ===
- Nils Lofgren (1975)
- Cry Tough (1976)

=== With Ian Hunter ===
- All American Alien Boy (1976)

=== With Journey ===
- Journey (1975)
- Look into the Future (1976)
- Next (1977)
- Infinity (1978)

=== With Sammy Hagar ===
- Nine on a Ten Scale (1976)

=== With Jefferson Starship ===
- Freedom at Point Zero (1979)
- Modern Times (1981)
- Winds of Change (1982)

=== With Paul Kantner ===
- Planet Earth Rock and Roll Orchestra (1983)

=== With Whitesnake ===
- Whitesnake (1987)
- 1987 Versions (1987)

=== With Ronnie Montrose ===
- The Diva Station (1990)

=== With Pat Travers ===
- Just a Touch (1992)
- Blues Magnet (1994)
- P.T. Power Trio (2003)

=== With Mogg/Way ===
- Edge of the World (1997)

=== With Mother's Army ===
- Fire on the Moon (1998)

=== With Eric Burdon ===
- The Official Live Bootleg #2 (1998)
- The Official Live Bootleg 2000 (2000)

=== With Michael Schenker ===
- Adventures of the Imagination (2000)

=== With UFO ===
- Covenant (2000)
- Sharks (2002)

=== With Leslie West ===
- Blues to Die For (2003)

=== With Jake E. Lee ===
- Retraced (2005)

=== With Keith Emerson ===
- Best Revenge (1985)
- Off the Shelf (2006)

=== Aynsley Dunbar ===
- Mutiny (2008)

== Bibliography ==
- Bob Brunning (1986) Blues: The British Connection, London: Helter Skelter, 2002, ISBN 1-900924-41-2
- Dick Heckstall-Smith (2004) The Safest Place in the World: A Personal History of British Rhythm and blues, Clear Books, ISBN 0-7043-2696-5 – First Edition : Blowing The Blues – Fifty Years Playing The British Blues
- Christopher Hjort Strange Brew: Eric Clapton and the British Blues Boom, 1965–1970, foreword by John Mayall, Jawbone (2007) ISBN 1-906002002
- Paul Myers: Long John Baldry and the Birth of the British Blues, Vancouver 2007 – GreyStone Books
- Harry Shapiro Alexis Korner: The Biography, Bloomsbury Publishing PLC, London 1997, Discography by Mark Troster
