= Ian Underwood =

American woodwind and keyboards player (born 1939)

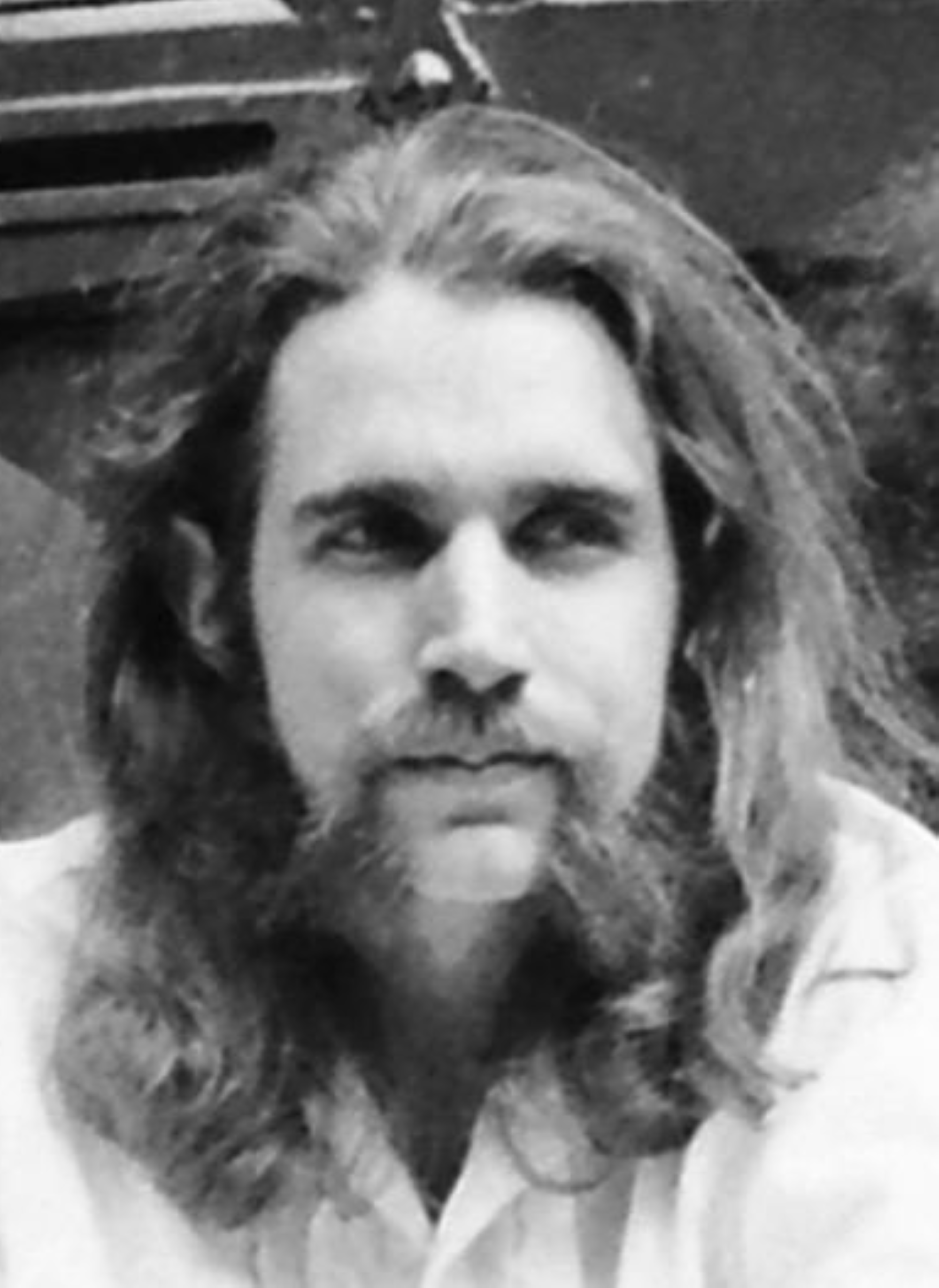
- Ian Underwood of the Mothers of Invention, early 1970s

Background information
- Born: May 22, 1939 (age 87); New York City, New York, United States
- Genres: Jazz; avant garde; experimental rock; jazz fusion; doo-wop; comedy rock
- Occupations: Musician, songwriter
- Instruments: Keyboards, saxophone, clarinet, flute, guitar, vocals
- Years active: 1959–present
- Formerly of: The Mothers of Invention

Ian Robertson Underwood (born May 22, 1939) is an American woodwind and keyboard player, who was a member of the original version of Frank Zappa's band the Mothers of Invention. Following the original band's split in late 1969, Underwood continued to work with Zappa extensively during the 1970s.

== Biography ==
Underwood graduated from The Choate School in 1957 and Yale University with a bachelor's degree in composition in 1961 and a master's degree in composition at UC Berkeley in 1966. He began his career by playing San Francisco Bay Area coffeehouses and bars with his improvisational group, the Jazz Mice, in the mid-1960s before he became a member of Frank Zappa and the Mothers of Invention in 1967 for their third studio album, We're Only in It for the Money. He speaks on Uncle Meat; on the track "Ian Underwood Whips It Out" he relates how he first met Zappa and demonstrated his capabilities on the saxophone at Zappa's invitation. Underwood later worked with Frank Zappa on his solo recordings, including 1969's Hot Rats. He married Ruth Komanoff (Underwood), marimbist/percussionist from the Mothers of Invention in May 1969. Underwood left the Mothers of Invention in September 1973. He and Ruth divorced in 1986.

After his association with Frank Zappa, he pursued a career as a session keyboardist. Underwood has made extensive use of the Minimoog synthesizer, mostly in film. He has been credited in recordings for Quincy Jones, Barbra Streisand, Ronee Blakley, Hugh Cornwell, Freddie Hubbard, Jean-Luc Ponty, Herb Alpert, Hugh Masekela, Peggy Lee, Dolly Parton, Chicago, Janet Jackson, Dave Grusin, Jefferson Airplane, Frankie Valli, the Carpenters, James Ingram, and Barry Manilow. Underwood was also one of the musicians who played the main title theme for the 1980s hit series Knight Rider. Underwood was the uncredited producer of the debut album by Alice Cooper, Pretties For You, in 1969.

Underwood contributed synthesizers and programming to the historic recording of the Michael Jackson/Lionel Richie single "We Are the World" (produced by Quincy Jones in 1985); he has also been a featured performer (mostly on keyboard) with James Horner on numerous James Horner film scores including Titanic (1997) and Sneakers (1992).

== Discography ==
Lenox School of Jazz Concert, 1959 w/ Ornette Coleman, Herb Pomeroy

With Frank Zappa/The Mothers of Invention

- We're Only in It for the Money (1968)
- Cruising with Ruben & the Jets (1968)
- Uncle Meat (1969)
- Hot Rats (1969)
- Burnt Weeny Sandwich (1970)
- Weasels Ripped My Flesh (1970)
- Chunga's Revenge (1970)
- Fillmore East - June 1971 (1971)
- 200 Motels (1971)
- Just Another Band from L.A. (1971)
- Over-Nite Sensation (1973)
- Apostrophe (1974)
- Zoot Allures (1976)
- Orchestral Favorites (1979)

With Sandy Hurvitz

- Sandy's Album Is Here At Last! (Bizarre, 1968)

With Captain Beefheart

- Trout Mask Replica (Straight, 1969)

With Alice Cooper

- Pretties for You (Straight, 1969)

With Jean-Luc Ponty

- King Kong: Jean-Luc Ponty Plays the Music of Frank Zappa (World Pacific/Liberty, 1970)

With Freddie Hubbard

- High Energy (Columbia, 1974)
- Liquid Love (Columbia, 1975)

With Quincy Jones

- Mellow Madness (A&M, 1975)
- Roots (A&M, 1977)
- The Dude (A&M, 1981)
- Back on the Block (Qwest/Warner Bros, 1989)

With Gábor Szabó

- Macho (Salvation, 1975)

With Alphonse Mouzon

- The Man Incognito (Blue Note, 1975)

With Porter Wagoner and Dolly Parton

- Say Forever You'll Be Mine (RCA Victor, 1975)

With Flo & Eddie

- Illegal, Immoral and Fattening (Columbia, 1975)
- Moving Targets (Columbia, 1976)

With Spirit

- Farther Along (Mercury, 1976)

With Carmen McRae

- Can't Hide Love (Blue Note, 1976)

With Seawind

- Seawind (CTI, 1976)

With Alphonso Johnson

- Moonshadows (1976)
- Yesterday's Dreams (1976)

With Chunky, Novi & Ernie

- Chunky, Novi, & Ernie (Warner Bros, 1977)

With Ambrosia

- Somewhere I've Never Travelled (20th Century Fox, 1978)

With Lalo Schifrin

- Gypsies (Tabu, 1978)
- No One Home (Tabu, 1979)

With Herb Alpert

- Herb Alpert / Hugh Masekela (Horizon, 1978)

With Barbra Streisand

- Songbird (Columbia, 1978)

With Peggy Lee

- Close Enough for Love (1979)

With Chicago

- Chicago XIV (Columbia, 1980)

With Janet Jackson

- Janet Jackson (A&M, 1982)

Jefferson Airplane

- Jefferson Airplane Loves You (1992)

Some of his work on film scores

- 2010 The Karate Kid (synthesizer programmer)
- 2009 Avatar (synthesizer programmer)
- 2008 The Boy in the Striped Pyjamas (synthesizer programmer)
- 2008 The Spiderwick Chronicles (music score programmer)
- 2007 The Life Before Her Eyes (music score programmer)
- 2006 Apocalypto (synthesizer programming)
- 2006 All the King's Men (synthesizer programmer)
- 2005 The New World (synthesizer programmer)
- 2004 Bobby Jones: Stroke of Genius (synthesizer programmer)
- 2001 I Iris (synthesizer programmer)
- 1998 Mighty Joe Young (musician)
- 1997 Titanic (musician: instrumental solo)
- 1995 Braveheart (instrumental soloist: synth programming, London Symphony Orchestra)
- 1993 Bopha! (musician)
- 1993 House of Cards (featured musician)
- 1993 Jack the Bear (musician)
- 1992 Sneakers (musician)
- 1991 Class Action (musician)
- 1991 My Heroes Have Always Been Cowboys (musician: instrumental solo)
- 1989 Field of Dreams (musician: instrumental solo)
- 1989 Honey, I Shrunk the Kids (synthesizer programming and performance)
- 1989 Winter People (musician: keyboards)
- 1988 Red Heat (musician)
- 1988 Willow (musician: Fairlight synthesizer)
- 1987 No Way Out (musician – as Ian R. Underwood)
- 1986 The Mosquito Coast (musician: synthesizers)
- 1986 The Name of the Rose (synthesizer programmer)
- 1986 Aliens (synthesizer effects)
- 1983 Krull (synthesizer effects)
- 1983 Brainstorm (synthesizer effects)
- 1982 Blade Runner (musician: synthesizer - New American Orchestra soundtrack)
- 1982 Tootsie (musician: synthesizer)
- 1979 The Warriors (musician: synthesizer)
- 1977 Demon Seed (electronic performances)
- 1976 Marathon Man (musician: keyboards – uncredited)
- 1971 200 Motels (music performer: Mothers of Invention)
