= Billy the Mountain =

Song by the Mothers

from the album Just Another Band from L.A.
- Released: March 26, 1972
- Recorded: August 7, 1971
- Genre: Comedy rock, progressive rock
- Length: 24:47 (Original); 30:25 (Playground Psychotics); 47:41 (Carnegie Hall)
- Label: Bizarre/Reprise
- Songwriter: Frank Zappa
- Producer: Frank Zappa

"Billy the Mountain" is a Frank Zappa piece first made available on the album Just Another Band from L.A. in 1972. The original recording, which took more than a half-hour to perform, was from a live tour performance on August 7, 1971, in Los Angeles, performed by Zappa with his band the Mothers and prominently featured the musical duo Flo & Eddie. The album recording had to be edited in order to fit on one side of the record. An alternate version of the song was featured on the 1992 album Playground Psychotics, and a third version of the song was posthumously released in 2011 by the Zappa Family Trust on the album Carnegie Hall.

The song is an intricate and absurd story in a parody of the song/story style of works such as "Peter and the Wolf" about a talking mountain named Billy and his "lovely wife" Ethel, "a tree growing off of his shoulder." The lyrics are a satirical myriad of monoculture imagery, the city of Los Angeles, the demise of urban America, and overall absurd juxtapositions of situations. While many of the details were improvised as the song was performed from town to town, the general structure of the song remained the same.

In 2009 Dweezil Zappa and his Zappa Plays Zappa ensemble performed "Billy the Mountain" as part of its "You Can't Fit on Stage Anymore" tour of small venues in the US.
