= Beat the Boots! III =

- Cover art for disc one

Live album / compilation album by Frank Zappa
- Released: January 25, 2009 (discs one and two); January 31, 2009 (discs three and four); February 1, 2009 (disc five); February 2, 2009 (disc six)
- Recorded: November 1961 to March 13, 1988
- Genres: Experimental rock 20th-century classical
- Length: Disc one: 54:46; Disc two: 59:22; Disc three: 57:09; Disc four: 52:17; Disc five: 67:35; Disc six: 67:49
- Label: Zappa

Beat the Boots! III is a series of compilation albums by Frank Zappa, released as MP3 downloads in 2009 by Zappa Records, following 1991's Beat the Boots! and 1992's Beat the Boots! #2. The series consists of six separate "discs" containing material from various bootleg albums and box sets that were originally distributed illegally prior to this series of official releases.

== Track listing ==
All music is composed by Frank Zappa, except where noted.

Disc one
| No. | Title | Recording location and date | Length |
|---|---|---|---|
| 1. | "VPRO Intro" | Frank Zappa, VPRO documentary, 1971 | 0:25 |
| 2. | "Status Back Baby" | Pal Recording Studio, Cucamonga, CA, Fall 1963 | 1:19 |
| 3. | "Ned the Mumbler" | Studio Z, Cucamonga, CA, c. 1964 | 1:46 |
| 4. | "Toads of the Short Forest" | Studio Z, Cucamonga, CA, c. 1964 | 1:49 |
| 5. | "In Memoriam, Hieronymus Bosch" | The Bitter End, October 15, 1967 | 5:02 |
| 6. | "Oh, In the Sky" | Colour Me Pop, October 23, 1968 | 2:27 |
| 7. | "Directly from My Heart to You" (Richard Penniman) | Grand Olympic Auditorium, LA, March 7, 1970 | 5:46 |
| 8. | "Twinkle Tits" | Grand Olympic Auditorium, LA, March 7, 1970 | 10:09 |
| 9. | "T'Mershi Duween" | Vancouver, BC, Canada, October 1, 1975 | 2:19 |
| 10. | "Black Napkins" | The Mike Douglas Show, October 28, 1976 | 4:31 |
| 11. | "Dong Work for Yuda" | unknown location, February, 1977 | 2:55 |
| 12. | "Mo's Vacation" | Poughkeepsie, NY, September 21, 1978 | 4:09 |
| 13. | "The Black Page #2" | Poughkeepsie, NY, September 21, 1978 | 2:59 |
| 14. | "Suicide Chump" | Stony Brook, NY, October 15, 1978 | 9:12 |
| Total length: | | | 54:46 |

Disc two
| No. | Title | Recording location and date | Length |
|---|---|---|---|
| 1. | "Heavy Duty Judy" | Pittsburgh, PA, November 13, 1980 | 4:41 |
| 2. | "Pick Me, I'm Clean" | studio rehearsal, c. July–August, 1980 | 3:31 |
| 3. | "Teen-age Wind" | studio rehearsal, c. July–August, 1980 | 3:07 |
| 4. | "Harder Than Yer Husband" | studio rehearsal, c. July–August, 1980 | 2:32 |
| 5. | "Bamboozled by Love" | studio rehearsal, c. July–August, 1980 | 3:07 |
| 6. | "Falling in Love Is a Stupid Habit" | home demo, June 1, 1981 | 1:46 |
| 7. | "This Is My Story" | The Ritz, NYC, November 17, 1981 | 1:21 |
| 8. | "Whipping Post" (Gregg Allman) | The Ritz, NYC, November 17, 1981 | 6:26 |
| 9. | "Clownz on Velvet" | The Ritz, NYC, November 17, 1981 | 5:55 |
| 10. | "In France" | Los Angeles, CA, July 22, 1984 | 3:54 |
| 11. | "Broken Hearts Are for Assholes" | Santa Monica, CA, December 11, 1981 | 5:47 |
| 12. | "I Am the Walrus" (Lennon–McCartney) | Springfield, MA, March 13, 1988 | 3:41 |
| 13. | "America the Beautiful" (Katherine Lee Bates, Samuel Augustus Ward) | Burlington, VT, March 12, 1988 | 3:15 |
| 14. | "America Drinks & Goes Home" | Whisky a Go Go, West Hollywood, California, July 23, 1968 | 0:51 |
| 15. | "Studebacher Hoch" (from "Billy the Mountain") | unknown location, 1971 | 6:07 |
| 16. | "Don't Fuck Around" (from "Billy the Mountain") | unknown location, 1971 | 1:32 |
| 17. | "Two on the Town" | unknown date and location | 0:22 |
| 18. | "Truck Driver Divorce" | unknown location, 1982 | 1:26 |
| Total length: | | | 59:22 |

Disc three
| No. | Title | Recording location and date | Length |
|---|---|---|---|
| 1. | "The World's Greatest Sinner" | Chaffey College Little Theater, Rancho Cucamonga, California, November–December, 1961 | 11:58 |
| 2. | "Spontaneous Minimalist Composition" | A Zappa Affair, Berkeley, CA, June 16, 1984 | 2:01 |
| 3. | "Sinister Footwear" | A Zappa Affair, Berkeley, CA, June 16, 1984 | 26:08 |
| 4. | "The Black Page" | UMRK, 1987 | 2:05 |
| 5. | "Pedro's Dowry" | A Zappa Affair, Berkeley, CA, June 16, 1984 | 8:28 |
| 6. | "None of the Above" | Los Angeles, CA, April 19, 1985 | 6:29 |
| Total length: | | | 57:09 |

Disc four
| No. | Title | Recording location and date | Length |
|---|---|---|---|
| 1. | "The Eric Dolphy Memorial Barbeque" | Appleton, WI, May 23, 1969 | 10:15 |
| 2. | "Hungry Freaks, Daddy" | Appleton, WI, May 23, 1969 | 3:40 |
| 3. | "The Wild Man Fischer Story" (Wild Man Fischer) | Fullerton, CA, November 8, 1968 | 3:40 |
| 4. | "I'm the Meany" (Wild Man Fischer) | Fullerton, CA, November 8, 1968 | 1:36 |
| 5. | "Bacon Fat" (Andre Williams, Dorothy Brown) | Fullerton, CA, November 8, 1968 | 3:51 |
| 6. | "King Kong" | Fullerton, CA, November 8, 1968 | 29:16 |
| Total length: | | | 52:17 |

Disc five
| No. | Title | Recording location and date | Length |
|---|---|---|---|
| 1. | "The Return of the Hunchback Duke" | Appleton, WI, May 23, 1969 | 8:39 |
| 2. | "Help, I'm a Rock" | Appleton, WI, May 23, 1969 | 5:21 |
| 3. | "What It Was" | Appleton, WI, May 23, 1969 | 10:10 |
| 4. | "Medley: Son of Mr. Green Genes / King Kong / Chunga's Revenge" | Arlington, TX, March 11, 1973 | 21:26 |
| 5. | "Watts" | Gothenburg, Sweden, September 25, 1974 | 5:19 |
| 6. | "Penguin in Bondage" | Roxy Theatre, West Hollywood, California, December 10, 1973, late show | 5:12 |
| 7. | "T'Mershi Duween" | Roxy Theatre, West Hollywood, California, December 10, 1973, late show | 1:53 |
| 8. | "The Dog Breath Variations" | Roxy Theatre, West Hollywood, California, December 10, 1973, late show | 1:47 |
| 9. | "Uncle Meat" | Roxy Theatre, West Hollywood, California, December 10, 1973, late show | 2:35 |
| 10. | "Rondo Hatton on Guitar" | Passaic, NJ, November 8, 1974 | 5:14 |
| Total length: | | | 67:35 |

Disc six
| No. | Title | Recording location and date | Length |
|---|---|---|---|
| 1. | "Ride My Face to Chicago" | unknown location, 1984 | 3:16 |
| 2. | "I'm the Slime" | unknown location, 1984 | 4:26 |
| 3. | "Be in My Video" | unknown location, 1984 | 3:23 |
| 4. | "He's So Gay" | unknown location, 1984 | 2:27 |
| 5. | "Cocksucker's Ball" | unknown location, 1984 | 1:03 |
| 6. | "WPLJ" (Luther McDaniels, Ray Dobard) | unknown location, 1984 | 1:37 |
| 7. | "What's New in Baltimore?" | unknown location, 1984 | 2:49 |
| 8. | "Hot Plate Heaven at the Green Hotel" | unknown location, 1984 | 3:22 |
| 9. | "Carol, You Fool" | unknown location, 1984 | 3:58 |
| 10. | "Chana in the Bushwap" | unknown location, 1984 | 3:58 |
| 11. | "Kreega Bundola" | unknown location, 1984 | 15:15 |
| 12. | "I'm the Slime" | Saturday Night Live, December 11, 1976 | 3:13 |
| 13. | "The Purple Lagoon" | Saturday Night Live, December 11, 1976 | 3:52 |
| 14. | "Peaches en Regalia" | Saturday Night Live, December 11, 1976 | 3:23 |
| 15. | "Dancin' Fool" | Saturday Night Live, October 21, 1978 | 3:56 |
| 16. | "The Meek Shall Inherit Nothing" | Saturday Night Live, October 21, 1978 | 3:33 |
| 17. | "St. Alphonzo's Pancake Breakfast / Rollo" | Saturday Night Live, October 21, 1978 | 4:17 |
| Total length: | | | 67:49 |

Original bootleg appearances:

- Disc one: tracks 1-14 from Apocrypha. Tracks 2-4 also from I Was a Teenage Maltshop, and tracks 9-10 also from Zut Alors.
- Disc two: tracks 1-13 from Apocrypha, tracks 14-18 from Randomonium.
- Disc three: tracks 1-4 from Apocrypha, track 5 from Return of the Son of Serious Music, track 6 from Randomonium.
- Disc four: tracks 1-6 from Pigs & Repugnant. Tracks 3-6 also from Our Man in Nirvana.
- Disc five: tracks 1-3 from Son of Pigs & Repugnant, tracks 4-5 from Zut Alors, tracks 6-10 from The Rondo Hatton Band. Tracks 6-9 also from Around the World.
- Disc six: tracks 1-11 from Big Mother Is Watching You, tracks 12-17 from Chalk Pie.
