= Finer Moments =

2012 posthumous album by Frank Zappa

Compilation album by Frank Zappa
- Released: December 18, 2012
- Recorded: 1967–1972
- Genres: Rock, avant-garde
- Length: 82:40
- Label: Zappa
- Producer: Frank Zappa

Frank Zappa chronology
Understanding America (2012)	Finer Moments (2012)	AAAFNRAA Baby Snakes: The Compleat Soundtrack (2012)

Professional ratings
Review scores
Source	Rating
AllMusic	3/5 stars

Finer Moments is a compilation album by Frank Zappa. It was compiled and mastered by Zappa in 1972 and released posthumously in 2012.

== Overview ==
Some of the tracks from this album have appeared (most of them under another title) on various other releases including 1991's You Can't Do That on Stage Anymore, Vol. 4, 1992's You Can't Do That on Stage Anymore, Vol. 5, 1998's Mystery Disc, 1996's The Lost Episodes, and 2011's Carnegie Hall.

== Track listing ==
All tracks are written by Frank Zappa.

Disc one
No.	Title	Source	Length
1.	"Intro"	Royal Albert Hall, June 6 1969	1:19
2.	"Sleazette"	Royal Albert Hall, June 6 1969	3:32
3.	"Mozart Piano Sonata in B♭"	You Can't Do That on Stage Anymore, Vol. 5	6:20
4.	"The Walking Zombie Music"	Royal Albert Hall, June 6 1969	3:22
5.	"The Old Curiosity Shoppe"	Chicago Auditorium Theatre, May 21 1971	7:08
6.	"You Never Know Who Your Friends Are"	Mystery Disc (Harmonica solo only)	2:19
7.	"Uncle Rhebus"	You Can't Do That on Stage Anymore, Vol. 5 (as "Baked Bean Boogie")	17:43

Disc two
No.	Title	Source	Length
1.	"Music from "The Big Squeeze""	The Lost Episodes	0:41
2.	"Enigmas 1 Thru 5"	Sunset Sound Recorders, September 1968	8:14
3.	"Pumped and Waxed"	Home recording 1971	4:18
4.	"There Is No Heaven from Where Slogans Go to Die"	You Can't Do That on Stage Anymore, Vol. 4 (as "You Call This Music?")	4:36
5.	"Squeeze It, Squeeze It, Squeeze It"	You Can't Do That on Stage Anymore, Vol. 5 (as "Right There")	3:20
6.	"The Subcutaneous Peril"	Carnegie Hall	19:38

== Personnel ==
Musicians

- Frank Zappa – guitar, vocals
- Don Preston – keyboards, Minimoog
- Ian Underwood – clarinet, keyboards, piano, alto sax, woodwind
- Bunk Gardner – tenor sax, woodwind
- Motorhead Sherwood – baritone sax
- Buzz Gardner – trumpet
- Roy Estrada – bass, vocals
- Jimmy Carl Black – drums
- Art Tripp – drums, percussion
- Lowell George – guitar (on "There Is No Heaven from Where Slogans Go to Die" and "Squeeze It, Squeeze It, Squeeze It")
- Dave Samuels – guest artist, vibraphone (on "There Is No Heaven from Where Slogans Go to Die")

on "The Old Curiosity Shoppe" :

- Frank Zappa – guitar
- Ian Underwood – alto sax
- Bob Harris – keyboards
- Jim Pons – bass
- Aynsley Dunbar – drums
- Howard Kaylan – cowbell, tambourine
- Mark Volman – cowbell, tambourine

on "The Subcutaneous Peril" :

- Frank Zappa – guitar
- Don Preston – keyboards, Minimoog
- Ian Underwood – keyboards
- Jim Pons – bass
- Aynsley Dunbar – drums

Production credits

- Ed Caraeff – photography
- Jerry Hansen – engineer
- Dick Kunc – engineer
- Stephen Marcussen – mastering
- Kerry McNabb – engineer
- Michael Mesker – layout, photography
- Bill Miller – cover art, liner notes
- Melanie Starks – production manager
- Joe Travers – transfers
- John Williams – photography

== Overlaps with other albums ==
- Burnt Weeny Sandwich
  - "Enigmas 1 Thru 5" contains parts from "Theme From Burnt Weeny Sandwich" in a sped-up version
- The Ark from Beat the Boots
  - "Uncle Rhebus" contains a shorter edit of "Uncle Meat/King Kong" (only the secondary theme of "King Kong")
- You Can't Do That on Stage Anymore, Vol. 4
  - "There Is No Heaven from Where Slogans Go to Die" is a slightly longer version of "You Call That Music?"
- You Can't Do That on Stage Anymore, Vol. 5
  - "Mozart Piano Sonata in B♭" is a different edit
  - "Uncle Rhebus" contains "Baked Bean Boogie" and "Piano/drum duet"
  - The final segment of "Squeeze It, Squeeze It, Squeeze It" (2:54–3:20) is also heard in "Right There"
- The Lost Episodes
  - "The Big Squeeze" is the same version
- Mystery Disc
  - "You Never Know Who Your Friends Are" is a longer version of "Harmonica Fun"
  - "Squeeze It, Squeeze It, Squeeze It" is a different edit of "Skweezit Skweezit Skweezit"
- Carnegie Hall
  - "The Subcutaneous Peril" is edited from "Pound for a Brown" and "King Kong"
