= Mystery Disc =

Compilation album by Frank Zappa
- Released: September 14, 1998
- Recorded: 1962–1969, 1972
- Genre: Rock
- Length: 77:44
- Label: Rykodisc
- Producer: Frank Zappa

Frank Zappa chronology
Have I Offended Someone? (1997)	Mystery Disc (1998)	EIHN (Everything Is Healing Nicely) (1999)

Professional ratings
Review scores
Source	Rating
AllMusic	3/5 stars

Mystery Disc is a compilation album by Frank Zappa. It was released on CD in 1998, compiling tracks that were originally released on two separate vinyl records and included in the mail order Old Masters box sets, which were released in three volumes between 1985 and 1987. (These box sets, issued on Barking Pumpkin, contained repressings of Zappa's albums from Freak Out! (1966) to Zoot Allures (1976), along with a 'Mystery Disc' in boxes one and two.) The CD omits the last two tracks from the 1985 LP, "Why Don'tcha Do Me Right?" and "Big Leg Emma", both of which are included on CD reissues of Absolutely Free (1967).

The recordings featured on Mystery Disc cover the early stages of Zappa's career, and were made between 1962 and 1969 (with the exception of "The Story of Willie the Pimp", a 1972 'field recording'). The material overlaps in places with that of You Can't Do That on Stage Anymore, Vol. 5 (1992), Ahead of Their Time (1993), The Lost Episodes (1996) and Finer Moments (2013). A number of the earlier tracks—"I Was a Teen-Age Malt Shop", "The Birth of Captain Beefheart" and "Metal Man Has Won His Wings", all likely recorded in 1964—feature Captain Beefheart on vocals. These are three light-hearted collaborations; "Metal Man Has Won His Wings" has Beefheart reading the lyrics directly from an advert for a comic book.

== Track listing ==
All tracks are written by Frank Zappa, except where noted.

No.	Title	Writer(s)	Recording details	Length
1.	"Theme from Run Home, Slow" (Alternate take on The Lost Episodes)		Original Sound, c. 1964	1:23
2.	"Original Duke of Prunes"		Original Sound, c. 1964	1:17
3.	"Opening Night at "Studio Z" (Collage)"		Studio Z, August 1, 1964	1:34
4.	"The Village Inn"		The Village Inn & Barbecue, Early 1965	1:17
5.	"Steal Away"	Jimmy Hughes	The Village Inn & Barbecue, Early 1965	3:43
6.	"I Was a Teen-Age Malt Shop"		Studio Z, Late 1964	1:10
7.	"The Birth of Captain Beefheart"		Studio Z, Late 1964	0:18
8.	"Metal Man Has Won His Wings"		Studio Z, Late 1964	3:06
9.	"Power Trio from The Saints 'n Sinners"		The Sinners And Saints Tavern, c. 1964	0:34
10.	"Bossa Nova Pervertamento"		Studio Z, March 25, 1965	2:15
11.	"Excerpt from The Uncle Frankie Show"		Studio Z, c. Halloween, 1964	0:40
12.	"Charva" (Also on The Lost Episodes)		Studio Z, 1964	2:01
13.	"Speed-Freak Boogie"		Studio Z, c. 1963	4:14
14.	"Original Mothers at The Broadside (Pomona)"		The Broadside, c. May 1965	0:55
15.	"Party Scene from Mondo Hollywood"		Mondo Hollywood	1:54
16.	"Original Mothers Rehearsal"		Seward St. Studio, Early 1966	0:22
17.	"How Could I Be Such a Fool?"		Seward St. Studio, Early 1966	1:49
18.	"Band introductions at The Fillmore West"		Fillmore Auditorium, June 24-25, 1966	1:10
19.	"Plastic People"	Richard Berry, Zappa	Fillmore Auditorium, June 24-25, 1966	1:58
20.	"Original Mothers at Fillmore East"		Royal Festival Hall, October 25, 1968 (early show)	0:50
21.	"Harry, You're a Beast" (From Ahead of Their Time)		Royal Festival Hall, October 25, 1968	0:30
22.	"Don Interrupts" (From Ahead of Their Time)		Royal Festival Hall, October 25, 1968	4:39
23.	"Piece One" (From Ahead of Their Time)		Royal Festival Hall, October 25, 1968	2:26
24.	"Jim/Roy" (From Ahead of Their Time)		Royal Festival Hall, October 25, 1968	4:04
25.	"Piece Two" (From Ahead of Their Time)		Royal Festival Hall, October 25, 1968	6:59
26.	"Agency Man" (From Ahead of Their Time)		Royal Festival Hall, October 25, 1968	3:25
27.	"Agency Man (Studio Version)"		Apostolic Recording Studio, 1968	3:27
28.	"Lecture from Festival Hall Show"		Royal Festival Hall, October 25, 1968	0:21
29.	"Wedding Dress Song/The Handsome Cabin Boy" (Also on The Lost Episodes)	Traditional; arranged by Zappa	Apostolic Recording Studio, 1968	2:36
30.	"Skweezit Skweezit Skweezit"		The Ballroom, February 16, 1969	2:57
31.	"The Story of Willie the Pimp"		Hot Rats sessions NYC c. August 1969	1:33
32.	"Black Beauty" (Also on You Can't Do That on Stage Anymore, Vol. 5)		Thee Image Club, February 7-9, 1969	5:23
33.	"Chucha"		Criteria Studios, c. February 1-7, 1969	2:47
34.	"Mothers at KPFK"		KPFK Studios, Early 1968	3:26
35.	"Harmonica Fun" (Full version on Finer Moments as "You Never Know Who Your Friends Are")		Criteria Studios, c. February 1-7, 1969	0:41

The tracks were separated across the original 'mystery discs' thus:

- Mystery Disc #1: tracks 1–20, plus "Why Don'tcha Do Me Right?" and "Big Leg Emma"
- Mystery Disc #2: tracks 21–35

== Overlaps with other albums ==
- You Can't Do That on Stage Anymore, Vol. 5
  - "Black Beauty" is an unedited version of "Underground Freak-Out Music"
- Ahead of Their Time:
  - "Original Mothers at Fillmore East" and "Lecture from Festival Hall Show": these tracks are from the same concert as the one of Ahead of Their Time but are not included on the latter album.
  - "Harry You're a Beast" is a shorter edit
  - "Don Interrupts" is a different edit than "Progress"
  - "Piece One" is a different edit than "Like It or Not"
  - "Jim/Roy" is a different edit than the same material on the tracks "The Jimmy Carl Black Philosophy Lesson", "Holding the Group Back" and "Holiday in Berlin"
  - "Piece Two" is a shorter edit of "The Rejected Mexican Pope Leaves the Stage" and "Undaunted, the Band Plays On"
  - "Agency Man" is a shorted edit
- The Lost Episodes
  - "Run Home Slow" is in mono and probably a different take
  - "Charva" is the stereo mix version
  - "Wedding Dress Song / Handsome Cabin Boy" is the same recording as the separate tracks on The Lost Episodes
- Finer Moments: see album page for more information
