= Leland Sklar =

American bassist (born 1947)

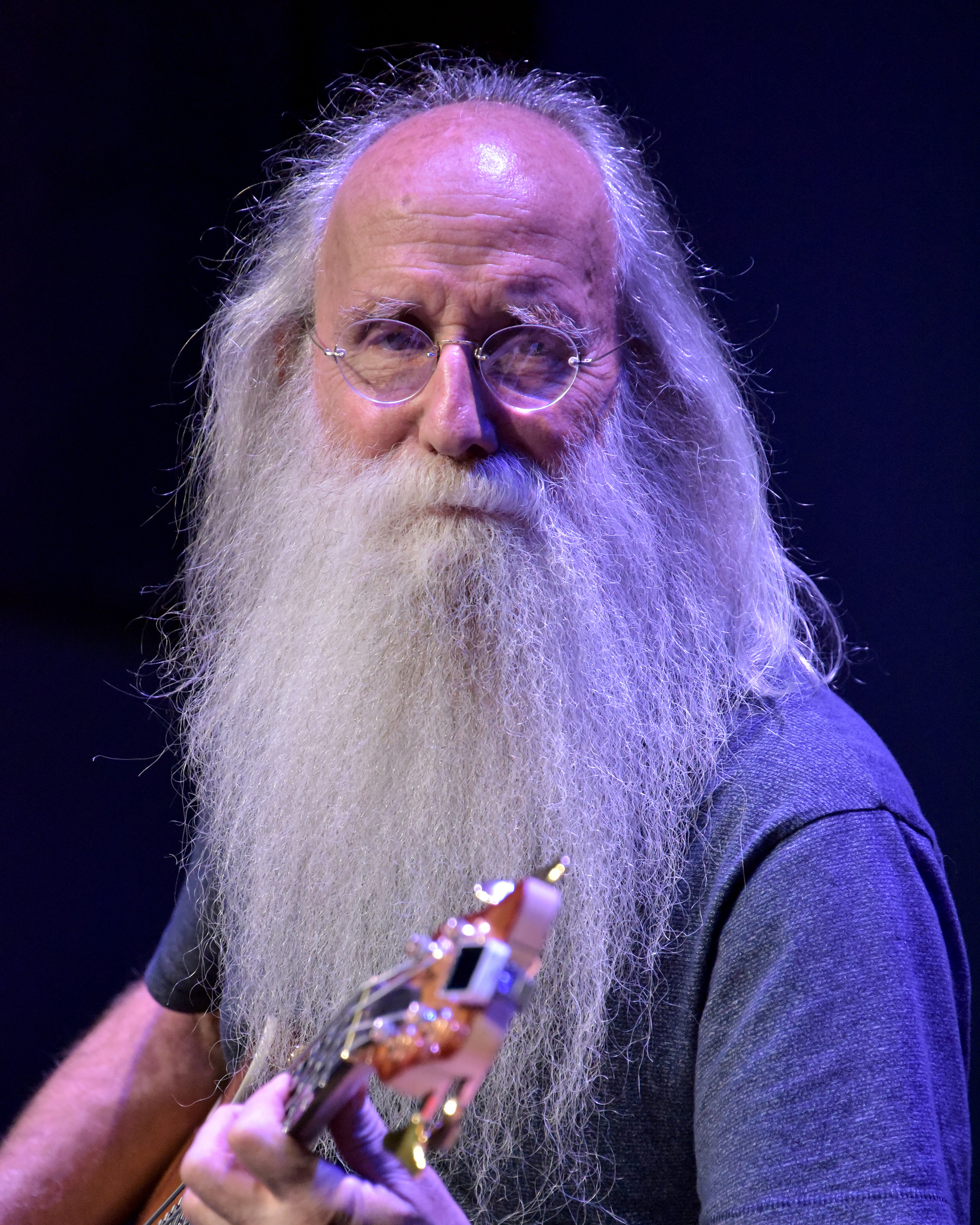
- Sklar performing live in 2017

Background information
- Born: Leland Bruce Sklar; May 28, 1947 (age 79); Milwaukee, Wisconsin, U.S.
- Origin: Southern California, U.S.
- Genres: Rock; pop; country; folk rock; jazz fusion; Christian contemporary
- Instruments: Bass guitar
- Years active: 1962–present
- Member of: The Immediate Family
- Formerly of: The Section; Jackson Browne; Warren Zevon; James Taylor; Phil Collins; Toto; Era
- Spouse: Maureen McGillan (m. 1970)
- Website: lelandsklarsbeard.com

Leland Bruce Sklar (born May 28, 1947) is an American bassist and session musician. He rose to prominence as a member of James Taylor's backing band, which coalesced into a group in its own right, The Section, which supported so many of Asylum Records' artists that they became known as Asylum's de facto house band, as those artists became iconic singer-songwriters of the 1970s.

Sklar has recorded and toured with artists including James Taylor, Jackson Browne, Carole King, Linda Ronstadt, Phil Collins, Toto, The Doors, Suzy Bogguss and Lyle Lovett. As a group member, session player, or touring musician, Sklar has appeared on over 2,000 albums, and contributed to many motion picture and television show soundtracks. Since 2018, he has been the bassist for The Immediate Family, a group reuniting lifelong friends and most of his former bandmates from The Section.

== Early life ==
Leland Bruce Sklar was born May 28, 1947, in Milwaukee, Wisconsin. His mother's family was from Duluth, Minnesota. His father's family was from Milwaukee. Originally, the paternal side of the family came from Odesa, Ukraine. Sklar is of Jewish heritage and his Ukrainian surname means glazier, a person whose profession is fitting glass into windows and doors.

When Leland was four, his family and he moved to Van Nuys, California, a central San Fernando Valley neighborhood in the northwest section of metropolitan Los Angeles.

At five, Sklar was inspired to take up classical piano from watching Liberace on TV. Sklar's mother already had a baby grand piano in the home. The Liberace Show completely captivated young Leland, Liberace's style and panache, the candelabra and his older brother George on the violin. Sklar started studying piano just after turning five years old. His natural talent and passion for the instrument saw him excel. By the time he was seven he had won awards from the Hollywood Bowl Association as the most accomplished young pianist in Los Angeles for his age group. By the time he was twelve, though, he was completely burned out. He had a piano teacher who he believes was living out her lack of a career through him.

He entered junior high at Birmingham High School, a combined high school of grades 7–12, and was diverted from the crowded field of pianists by his orchestra teacher, Ted Lynn, to an old blonde Kay upright bass. Sklar took to it immediately and began playing string bass in the orchestra and dance band. In high school, Sklar was in the marching band and played bass drum for the first year. He then sought other options. Being a bass player, he was given three choices: the bass drum, Sousaphone or drum major. Sklar chose to become one of the dual drum majors. He was sent to Redlands University for a summer course in being a drum major and designing half time shows. He still has his baton. Sklar graduated from Birmingham High School in 1965 and stopped shaving, the beginning of his iconic beard.

After The Beatles hit, things changed dramatically. As soon as the guitar players and piano players got amplifiers, Sklar's upright bass couldn't compete with their volume. Across the street from the American Federation of Musicians Local 47 building in Hollywood is now a music store called Stein on Vine. It used to be under the Musicians Union when it was just the Stein Music Co. Sklar and his father went there and his father bought him a Melody bass and a St. George amp. The whole setup probably cost $80 at the time. Soon after that, Sklar was only getting calls for electric bass work.

Between 1965 and 1970, Sklar attended San Fernando Valley State College. He began as a music major, but became disillusioned in the music department after two years when he realized the curriculum was geared more toward producing music teachers than towards performance. He went to the administration building and took a battery of aptitude tests and found his highest aptitudes were in art and science. As a result, he changed to co-majors in art and science with the thought of becoming a medical or technical illustrator.

While at San Fernando Valley State, Sklar played in the orchestra. For the first two years, Sklar played in the string bass section, which consisted of himself and Daryl Dragon, who would later become the Captain of the Captain & Tennille. Also during this period, Sklar was in a band called Little John Farm with singer/guitarist Denny "Steve" Aaberg, Dennis Dragon on drums, and Doug Dragon on B3 organ. Dennis and Doug Dragon were Daryl's two brothers. Other classmates while attending San Fernando Valley State were saxophonist Tom Scott and actor/comedian Cheech Marin.

Sklar spent five years at San Fernando Valley State, but never graduated, because his own music career would intervene.

== Career ==
In the 1960s, Sklar was in numerous bands, including Mike and the Mad Men, The Percolators, The Comfortable Charos, The Brimstones, and The El Dorados. Sometimes he was in five bands at one time, doing all kinds of music, trying to find himself. The Brimstones (1966) are of note because Sklar played together with guitarist Dan Dugmore, his oldest friend in the music business. Sklar has commented that the music business is based on networking. He tried to meet as many people as possible, worked really hard, and hoped for the best. Two other bands from this period were important to his career: Group Therapy (1967) and Wolfgang (1969).

In 1967, Group Therapy had been signed to the Canterbury label and went into United Studios in Hollywood to record. However, the young musicians were so inexperienced they weren't allowed to play their instruments. The band at the time consisted of David Finer (vocals and rhythm guitar) and Jeff Finer (vocals), Greg Wood (vocals), Lee Sklar (bass and vocals), and Ira Ingber (lead guitar - brother of Elliot Ingber, a founding member of The Mothers Of Invention and Fraternity of Man). The group did do their own vocals, but the music was recorded by the legendary Wrecking Crew. Carol Kaye and Bobby West were on bass, Hal Blaine was on drums, and Jim Gordon was the percussionist. Mike (Michel) Rubini, Mike Melvoin, and Larry Knechtel were the keyboard players. Mike Deasy, Dennis Budimir, Al Casey and Tommy Tedesco were on guitars. Sklar said he was intimidated by the skill of these players and didn't believe he could do what they did, but three and a half years later he was working with them every day. At least four tracks were cut, "Magic in the Air," "Bad News," "Little Bird," and "Million Dollar Movie". Test pressings were made of the latter two songs, but never released. A single of "Magic in the Air" as the A-side and "Bad News" as the B-side was released and broke into the Billboard Hot 100, affording Group Therapy the opportunity to open for The Byrds and Canned Heat at the Anaheim Convention Center and for The Seeds at Cal State Northridge. The tracks were produced by Mike Post. It was through this connection that Sklar would later work with Post on every one of his TV shows: The Rockford Files, Magnum, P.I., Hill Street Blues, The A-Team, to name a few.

In 1969, Sklar was the bass player for a hard rock band managed by Bill Graham called Wolfgang, consisting of Bryn Haworth, Ricky Lancelotti, Kevin Kelley, Randy Zacuto and Warren 'Bugs' Pemberton. They opened for Led Zeppelin, but their only recordings were unreleased demo tracks. It was during this time Sklar met James Taylor. A friend of Wolfgang's drummer Bugs Pemberton, John Fischbach, co-owner of Crystal Sound on Vine Street in Hollywood, brought his friend James Taylor around to Wolfgang's rehearsal house in Sunland. Taylor spent a couple of days with the band. Later, Taylor was offered an appearance at the Troubadour and, remembering Sklar, asked his manager Peter Asher to invite Sklar to play bass at that show. Both musicians thought the work would be short-term, but Taylor's career took off soon thereafter with his first hit record, Sweet Baby James. Sklar became part of Taylor's backing band, along with Danny Kortchmar, Russ Kunkel, and Carole King, all joining Taylor in his rise to fame. Soon, with that exposure, Sklar was being asked to record with many other artists.

Sklar has attributed the meteoric rise in his career, from an obscure local musician to a noted in-demand player, to producer/musician Peter Asher's insistence on crediting the musicians on the albums he produced. From his first recording with James Taylor on Mud Slide Slim and the Blue Horizon in 1971, Sklar has said that many of the burgeoning singer/songwriters looked to the musicians who helped propel Taylor to fame as worth engaging for their own efforts. Asher's crediting practice also marked a profound transition from the relative obscurity of members of The Wrecking Crew era to the next generation of high profile, named performers.

In the 1970s, Sklar worked together so frequently with drummer Russ Kunkel, guitarist Danny Kortchmar, and keyboardist Craig Doerge, who replaced King after her own rise to stardom, that they became "The Section," a distinction Taylor had bestowed upon them as his rhythm section. They backed other artists, such as Jackson Browne. The Section recorded three rock fusion albums of their own under that name, in 1972, 1973 and 1977. With little label support, however, The Section disbanded in 1978, in favor of more lucrative individual endeavors.

In the 1980s, Sklar focused on session work in Los Angeles, Nashville, and Europe. However, with the advent of CDs and digital copying, album revenue dropped and session budgets shrank. Live performances and touring became more important to the music industry.

Sklar worked on the Phil Collins album No Jacket Required and toured as part of Collins' band on The No Jacket Required World Tour from February through July 1985. Sklar worked again with Collins on the album ...But Seriously in 1989 and toured with the Seriously, Live! World Tour, which ran between February and October 1990, covering 121 dates. Sklar toured again with Collins on The First Final Farewell Tour (2004–2005) and the Not Dead Yet Tour (2017–2019).

In 1993 while recording at The Site in Marin County on what would become Linda Ronstadt's album Winter Light, Sklar got a phone call from Michael Frondelli, who ran Capitol Records Studios and was producing a band, the Barefoot Servants. They were looking for a bass player and asked if he was interested. Frondelli sent Sklar a demo cassette and, after three notes, Sklar said "count me in". Sklar had never met the three other seasoned musicians before: Jon Butcher (guitar, vocals), Ben Schultz (guitar, mandolin, slide guitar), and Ray Brinker (drums, percussion). The foursome rehearsed and cut the first, self-titled album, Barefoot Servants, live in the studio. The band followed by going on The Southern Spirit Tour in 1994 with The Marshall Tucker Band, 38 Special, The Fabulous Thunderbirds, and the Outlaws. They called it Bubbapolooza. Over time, the Barefoot Servants became a cult band; the label (Epic) offered little support. Eleven years after their first album, the Barefoot Servants recorded a second album at Ben Schultz's home studio, this time with Neal Wilkinson on drums. They called it Barefoot Servants 2, reminiscent of the line from the Bob Dylan song All Along the Watchtower. (Jon Butcher is a great admirer of Jimi Hendrix.) The album was released in August 2005 on the Atom Records label.

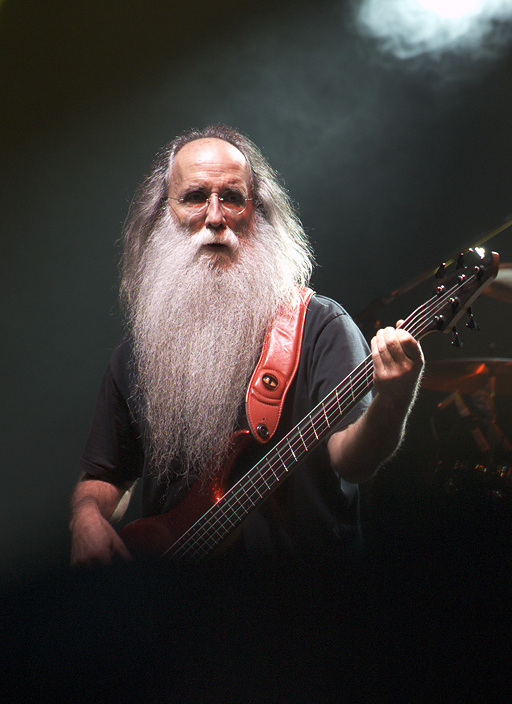
Sklar in 2007

Sklar performed again with James Taylor, Carole King, Danny Kortchmar and Russ Kunkel in a series of six shows at the Troubadour on November 28–30, 2007 for the 50th Anniversary of the club. They all teamed up again for the Troubadour Reunion Tour in 2010.

Sklar did the Falling In Between Tour with Toto in 2007–2008, filling in for his friend Mike Porcaro, who was stricken with ALS. Sklar united again with Toto in 2016–2017 on the Toto XIV Tour.

Sklar has also toured with Lyle Lovett, Peter Asher, Véronique Sanson, Tracy Chapman, Van Dyke Parks, and Judith Owen, among others.

In 2018, reuniting several members of The Section, a new group was formed, The Immediate Family, with Leland Sklar on bass, Russ Kunkel on drums, Danny Kortchmar and Waddy Wachtel on guitars and vocals, and musician/producer Steve Postell on vocals and guitar. The group has toured Japan and released a number of recordings. Their first, eponymously titled, U.S. album, The Immediate Family, was released in 2021. A brief tour of select cities in the U.S. was conducted in November 2021.

In 2020, while idled by the COVID pandemic, Sklar started a YouTube channel, initially to demonstrate the bass parts to a few of the songs he'd played on tour with Phil Collins, but which grew exponentially into a journey of music appreciation and an exploration of his expansive career. Sklar also created a coffee table book, Everybody Loves Me, of approximately 6000 photos from a collection of over 12,000 images of celebrities and common folk giving him "the finger," which has become his signature gesture. A website to service his book, art prints, T-shirts and other merchandise was developed. He created a web presence for social interaction called Lee's Clubhouse. Sklar has also explored the NFT market with another web site.

On May 6, 2020, Sklar created a Top Ten list of his favorite songs of all time for Spotify. They were With A Little Help From My Friends performed by Joe Cocker, Back in the High Life Again by Steve Winwood, Millworker by James Taylor, The Lark Ascending by Ralph Vaughan Williams, The Rubberband Man by The Spinners, the title track from the album No Other by Gene Clark, Knock On Wood by Eddie Floyd, Behind The Lines - 2015 Remastered by Phil Collins, Um, Um, Um, Um, Um, Um by Major Lance, and Harlem Shuffle by Bob & Earl.

Sklar has stated that his favorite bassist was Rinat Ibragimov, formerly of the London Symphony Orchestra.

Sklar has also been a part of the annual bands assembled in support of the "We Write The Songs" event sponsored by ASCAP at the Library of Congress in Washington, D.C., and the pre-show for the Grammy Awards.

On January 2, 2022, Sklar was seen performing in concert with James Taylor and Carole King in the CNN documentary "Just Call Out My Name."

On April 28 2026 Leland Sklar was inducted into the Musicians Hall of Fame in Nashville, along with a number of other musicians such as Keith Urban, Dolly Parton and George Thorogood & The Destroyers.

== Equipment ==
=== Basses ===
==== Peace/Love ====
When Sklar gained notice in 1970, he was playing a 1962 Fender Jazz Bass, his first professional bass, which he carved up with the artistic flair of the time. He calls it his Peace/Love bass. He played the bass on James Taylor's One Man Dog, on the early Section albums, and on Billy Cobham's Spectrum. He played it exclusively until 1974.

==== Frankenstein ====
Sklar's favorite instrument came next, an electric bass constructed by John Carruthers, the repairman at Westwood Music, in 1973. It was customized from various bass parts, consisting of a 1962 Fender Precision Bass neck, reshaped to the profile of Sklar's 1962 Fender Jazz Bass neck and fitted with mandolin fret wire, the smallest available (and on all of his subsequent basses), an alder Charvel P-Bass body with two sets of first-generation EMG Precision Bass pickups in reversed orientation, routed into J-Bass positions, and power by a 9 volt battery each, a Badass II bridge, and a prototype Hipshot detuner. He refers to it as "Frankenstein". The bass has been used on roughly 85 percent of his recordings.

==== Dingwall ====
In 2004, Sklar began playing a signature model five-string bass made by Dingwall Guitars. This was his main bass on tour and was also used in various recordings. The bass uses fanned frets, which result in longer low strings and shorter high strings.

==== Warwick ====
In 2010, Sklar began playing the Warwick Star Bass II, which has since become his main bass in the studio.

In 2013, after years of having been a Warwick Star Bass II player, he became an endorser of that instrument.

At the 2016 NAMM Show, Warwick announced their Lee Sklar signature bass, based on the Star Bass but with an offset body shape and a forearm contour.

==== Others ====
Previously, Sklar also had signature instruments from Gibson and Valley Arts Guitar.

Sklar owns a Washburn AB45 five string acoustic bass which he was not pleased with until he removed the frets, making it a fretless bass. He said, then, "It came alive." He uses black nylon tape wound strings on the Washburn. In his work, he uses fretless sparingly.

Sklar owns a Höfner bass he uses only as the song demands.

Sklar had an Alembic bass which he sold to John Entwistle of The Who.

Sklar also used various Yamaha basses, such as the BB series, most noticeably around the time of James Taylor's JT album.

=== Strings ===
Sklar uses GHS Super Steel medium light strings: .040, .058, .080, and .102 inches in diameter. He likes a .040 G-string for its flexibility, facilitating expressive playing. His Dingwall bass has Dingwall strings, with a GHS .040 G-string. On his five string basses, he use GHS Super Steels: .040, .058, .080, .100 and .130 gauge. He uses nylon taped strings on the Washburn.

On the recording sessions for the album Framed by Dave Lambert (of the Strawbs) in 1979, Sklar shared bass duties on the project with John Entwistle of The Who. At one point, the men tried out each other's basses and found they were nearly unable to play the other's instrument: Sklar set his action very high and Entwistle set his very low.

=== Amplification ===
Sklar keeps his amplification implementations simple and adaptable. He has three basic Euphonic Audio amp set ups for three specific applications: studio, intimate settings, and larger stage situations. Sklar has been using EA amplification roughly since 2003.

==== Studio set up ====
Sklar's studio rig is a Euphonic Audio iAMP 800 combo (all-in-one) amp.

==== Intimate set up ====
For intimate settings, Sklar uses a Euphonic Audio Doubler amp with an EA cabinet with a single 10" speaker in it (Euphonic Audio Wizzy-110). This is the rig he has used when playing with Judith Owen.

==== Stage set up ====
For larger stage venues, Sklar uses an EA iAMP Classic and an EA iAMP Pro for redundancy with a four 10" speaker bottom (Euphonic Audio NL-410W) and optionally attached to that is a Euphonic single 12" speaker cabinet (Euphonic Audio NL-112) with a Yamaha Subkick placed 1/2" in front of it. He blends the signal from a DI (direct input) and the Subkick. This is the rig he used when playing with Phil Collins, James Taylor and Carole King, Toto, and with The Immediate Family. When playing with Lyle Lovett, the 12" cabinet and Subkick were omitted.

=== Accessories ===
Sklar has Moog Taurus pedals and Fast Forward Designs Midi Step pedals which he used on the Phil Collins song In the Air Tonight.

Sklar uses Cordial cables, a Tube Works DI (direct input) box, and a Boss OC-2 Octave divider. He is known to have used a Petersen tuner, as well as a TC Electronics "polytune" which he has said is incredibly accurate and unobtrusive.

== Selected film appearances ==
- Rhinestone (Actor: Rhinestone House Band, as Lee Sklar) — (1984)
- Ticker (Actor: Blues Band Bass) — (2001)
