= Run Home, Slow =

1965 western film

- Directed by: Ted Brenner
- Written by: Don Cerveris
- Produced by: Eugene Frenke
- Starring: Mercedes McCambridge; Linda Gaye Scott; Allen Richards; Gary Kent; Jim Logan; Brian Casey; Leah Cooper
- Cinematography: Lew Guinn
- Edited by: John Winfield
- Music by: Frank Zappa
- Release date: 1965
- Running time: 75 minutes
- Country: United States
- Language: English

Run Home, Slow is a 1965 American Western film starring Mercedes McCambridge, Linda Gaye Scott, and Gary Kent, directed by Ted Brenner and written by Don Cerveris.

== Plot ==
After her father is murdered by hanging, Nell Hagen (McCambridge) sets out with her brothers Ritt (Kent) and Kirby (Richards), and cousin Julie Ann (Scott), to seek revenge. The residents of Pebble Springs have revolted, hanging Judd Hagen, their self-anointed ruler, in the middle of the night. The powerful Judd Hagen, who ruled their valley with an iron fist, was hanged by locals, who viewed him as a vicious man who thought he was God. They also thought he was crazy, a trait he seems to have passed on to his children, who vow vengeance. The family includes tough ranch lady cowgirl Nell Hagen, who idolized her father. The hate-filled leader Nell says a lot of swear words and insults like "Hellnation!.."; then there's her cowboy brother Ritt Hagen; Kirby, their cartoonish, hunchbacked, and apparently simple-minded handyman brother; and pretty, sensuous, but equally apparently simple-minded nymphomaniac Julie Ann, who was recruited to marry Ritt so they could keep the Hagen bloodline alive. The giggling blonde bride carries a pink parasol with her. The family then robs the Pebble Springs bank, killing 2 tellers. Then they visit the home of old man Gately, who helped prod the lynch mob into action. Nell and the clan kill Gately, who had their dad lynched, and then they kill his son on Nell's order, but their horses are killed too, and Ritt is wounded and spends most of the rest of the film laid up. They head into the desert, dodging the sheriff's posse, planning to possibly go to Mexico, but they may have to make that trek to Mexico without horses, without guns, without food, and without water. But they do have a burro, the bags full of money, and Julie Ann's pretty pink parasol. Julie Ann starts whining that she wants to give up, but she's bolstered by the bag of bank money.

After a despairing desert ride home, they find an abandoned farmhouse and bury the money, and Nell tries to heal Ritt. Time passes, and fickle Julie Ann seduces Kirby near the rotting corpse of the mule, which he had to kill for dinner, since Nell has banished them to the barn. Nell is suspicious, but she needs Julie Ann to bear children since they are the last of the Hagens. But Julie Ann gets bored and longs for excitement and glamour, and tries to get wishy-washy Kirby to run away with her. When he isn't sure, Nell catches her digging up her share of the money, and Julie Ann defiantly says she's leaving. Nell doesn't stop her, but sends sobbing sap Kirby after her with an axe. Ritt gets on his feet and calls Nell evil, and says she just wants to preserve the Hagen name. Nell replies that Ritt and Kirby have done all the killing. Ritt sends her to stop Kirby, but it's too late. Kirby finds Julie Ann, and she desperately tries to sweet-talk him into sparing her. Kirby is unable to axe her at first, but when he realizes she is a two-faced, selfish liar, he strangles her to death and carries her back. Nell goes to tell Ritt and sees he's hung himself, and she goes outside in despair and finds Kirby dead next to Julie Ann's body. Apparently he's killed himself too, or Ritt killed him before hanging himself. Nell can't move the tree bark to get the money, so she staggers off into the desert half-crazed, the last of the Hagens, despite her best efforts.

== Music ==
Cerveris had previously taught English at Antelope Valley High School in California, where Frank Zappa had been one of his pupils. After leaving the job to move to a career in screenwriting, he and Zappa had remained in touch, and in 1959 he persuaded Tim Sullivan, the producer of Run Home, Slow, to commission Zappa to compose and conduct the score for the film.

One of the themes Zappa composed, And Very True, became the basis for the track Duke of Prunes on the Mothers of Invention's 1967 album Absolutely Free. Studio performances of the film's main theme later featured in Zappa's posthumous compilation albums The Lost Episodes, as a stereo mix, and Mystery Disc, as a mono mix with an additional Zappa guitar solo. A live performance of the theme is included in You Can't Do That on Stage Anymore, Vol. 5.
