= Plastic People =

Song by the Mothers of Invention

from the album Absolutely Free
- Released: May 26, 1967
- Recorded: November 15, 1966
- Genre: Experimental rock, Protest song
- Length: 3:42
- Label: Verve
- Composer: Frank Zappa
- Producers: Frank Zappa, Tom Wilson

"Plastic People" is the first track of the Mothers of Invention's 1967 album Absolutely Free. A live version from 1969 is featured on You Can't Do That on Stage Anymore, Vol. 1, released in 1988, as track 1 on disc 2, along with a "Louie, Louie/Plastic People"-like version titled "Ruthie-Ruthie" from 1974 as Track 10 on disc 1. It was also featured on the 1998 Mystery Disc release.

The title was the inspiration for the name of the Czech band Plastic People of the Universe. The tune is loosely based on Richard Berry's 1957 classic "Louie Louie". The song is a manifesto against conformity and materialistic culture, with Frank Zappa finally asking, "Go home/and check yourself/you think we're singing 'bout someone else?"

It is sampled throughout the GZA single "Cold World" from the Liquid Swords album.
