= Timothy Carey =

American actor (1929–1994)

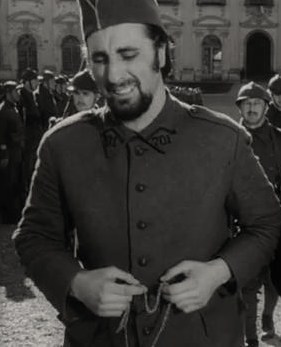
- Carey in Paths of Glory (1957)
- Born: Timothy Agoglia Carey; March 11, 1929; Brooklyn, New York, U.S.
- Died: May 11, 1994 (aged 65); Los Angeles, California, U.S.
- Occupations: Actor, film director
- Years active: 1951–1990
- Spouse: Doris Carey
- Children: 6

Timothy Agoglia Carey (March 11, 1929 – May 11, 1994) was an American film and television character actor who was typically cast as manic or violent characters who are driven to extremes. He is particularly known for his collaborations with Stanley Kubrick in the films The Killing (1956) and Paths of Glory (1957), and for appearing in the two John Cassavetes directed films Minnie and Moskowitz (1971) and The Killing of a Chinese Bookie (1976). Other notable film credits include Crime Wave (1954), East of Eden (1955), One-Eyed Jacks (1961), Beach Blanket Bingo (1965), Head (1968) and The Outfit (1973).

Carey was also a writer and director, with the low budget independent film The World's Greatest Sinner (1962) being his most noteworthy project.

== Early life and career ==
Carey enlisted in the U.S. Marine Corps during World War II at age 15, an experience he despised. He made his screen debut with a minor role in Billy Wilder's 1951 movie Ace in the Hole (alternately titled The Big Carnival). One of Carey's most recognized early roles is in the 1956 Stanley Kubrick film The Killing, in which he portrays a gunman hired to shoot a racehorse as a diversion from a racetrack robbery. Kubrick then cast him in his next film, the World War I drama Paths of Glory (1957), as one of three soldiers accused of cowardice.

During the filming of Paths of Glory, Carey was reportedly disruptive and tried to draw more attention to his character. Due to this behavior, a scene in which Carey and the other actors were served a duck dinner as a final meal before execution, took 57 takes to complete. Carey then faked his own kidnapping to generate personal publicity, which prompted Kubrick and producer James B. Harris to fire him. As a result, the film does not depict the three condemned soldiers during the battle scene, and a double was used during a scene in which a priest hears Carey's character's confession. The scene was filmed with the double's back to the camera.

The 1957 film Bayou (later retitled Poor White Trash) features one of Carey's few leading roles, as a demented Cajun shopkeeper named Ulysses. Carey also has roles in East of Eden, The Wild One, One-Eyed Jacks, The Boy and the Pirates, Bikini Beach, Beach Blanket Bingo and the John Cassavetes–directed films Minnie and Moskowitz and The Killing of a Chinese Bookie.

Francis Ford Coppola was eager to cast Carey as Luca Brasi in The Godfather, but Carey turned down the part so he could film a television pilot called "Tweet’s Ladies of Pasadena", which was never sold or broadcast. The proposed TV show starred Carey as a character named Tweet Twig, who could bring animals back from the dead.

He plays a minor role as the Angel of Death in the comedy film D.C. Cab, and appears in the Monkees self-parody musical comedy Head. His final appearance is in the 1986 movie Echo Park.

According to director Quentin Tarantino, Carey auditioned for the role of Joe Cabot in Tarantino's Reservoir Dogs. Although Carey did not get the role, the screenplay is dedicated to him, among others.

Carey also did a select amount of acting on television from the 1950s through the 1980s. Carey first appeared on Gunsmoke in 1958, playing “Tiller Evans”, a wild, abusive & jealous cowboy in the episode “The Gentleman”, alongside Jack Cassidy (S3E39). He later portrayed the character Charles Buster Rilla, a deranged gunman, in the 1966 episode “Quaker Girl” (S12E12). He has a minor role as Bert in "Ransom for a Dead Man", a pilot for the series Columbo, which guest-stars Lee Grant and originally aired on March 1, 1971. Carey reprised that role in the Columbo episode "Dead Weight", which guest-stars Eddie Albert and Suzanne Pleshette and was first broadcast on October 27, 1971.

Carey's face (from the movie The Killing) is positioned behind George Harrison on the cover of the Beatles album Sgt. Pepper's Lonely Hearts Club Band. Although Carey's image does not appear on the commercially released version of the cover, it can be seen on outtake photos from the Sgt. Pepper session.

=== The World's Greatest Sinner ===
Carey wrote, produced, directed, and starred in the 1962 feature The World's Greatest Sinner, whose music soundtrack was scored by a young, pre-Mothers of Invention Frank Zappa. Although it did not have wide commercial release, the film achieved cult status through repeated screenings at the "midnight movies" in Los Angeles in the 1960s. During a 1963 appearance on The Steve Allen Show during which he generated musical sounds on bicycles, Zappa talked about scoring the soundtrack for The World's Greatest Sinner, which he called "the world's worst movie."

The movie was featured as a midnight show at the Turner Classic Movies Festival in Hollywood in April 2018. His son, Romeo Carey, a journalism instructor, now retired, for Beverly Hills High School's KBEV Channel 6 TV, introduced the film.

== Personal life ==
Carey was born in Bay Ridge, Brooklyn, to a family of Italian and Irish descent.

Carey and his wife Doris had six children: Romeo, Mario, Velencia, Silvana, Dagmar, and Germain.

Carey died of a stroke in 1994 at the age of 65 in Los Angeles. His body is interred at Rose Hills Memorial Park in Whittier, California.

== Partial filmography ==
- Ace in the Hole (a.k.a. The Big Carnival) (1951) - Construction Worker (uncredited)
- Across the Wide Missouri (1951) – Baptiste DuNord (uncredited)
- Hellgate (1952) – Wyand (uncredited)
- Bloodhounds of Broadway (1952) – Crockett Pace (uncredited)
- White Witch Doctor (1953) – Jarrett
- Crime Wave (1953) – Johnny Haslett (uncredited)
- The Wild One (1953) – Chino's Boy #1 (uncredited)
- Alaska Seas (1954) – Wycoff
- East of Eden (1955) – Joe (uncredited)
- Finger Man (1955) – Lou Terpe
- Francis in the Navy (1955) – Auctioneer's Helper (uncredited)
- I'll Cry Tomorrow (1955) – Derelict (uncredited)
- The Killing (1956) – Nikki Arcane
- Francis in the Haunted House (1956) – Hugo
- The Last Wagon (1956) – Cole Harper (uncredited)
- Flight to Hong Kong (1956) – Lagarto
- Rumble on the Docks (1956) – Frank Mangus
- Bayou (a.k.a. Poor White Trash) (1957) – Ulysses
- House of Numbers (1957) – Frenchy – Arnie's Cell Mate (uncredited)
- Paths of Glory (1957) – Private Maurice Ferol
- Unwed Mother (1958) – Doctor
- Revolt in the Big House (1958) – Ed 'Bugsy' Kyle
- The Gunfight at Dodge City (1959) – Forbes, Regan's Deputy (uncredited)
- The Boy and the Pirates (1960) – Morgan
- One-Eyed Jacks (1961) – Howard Tetley
- The Second Time Around (1961) – Bonner
- The World's Greatest Sinner (1962) – Clarence Hilliard
- Mermaids of Tiburon (1962) – Milo Sangster
- Convicts 4 (1962) – Nick
- Shock Treatment (1964) – Hulking Patient (uncredited)
- Bikini Beach (1964) – South Dakota Slim
- Rio Conchos (1964) – Chico (uncredited)
- Beach Blanket Bingo (1965) – South Dakota Slim
- Duel at Diablo (1966) – Deputy Clem (uncredited)
- A Time for Killing (1967) – Billy Cat
- Waterhole No. 3 (1967) – Hilb
- Head (1968) – Lord High 'n Low
- Change of Habit (1969) – Ajax Market Manager (uncredited)
- Tweet's Ladies of Pasadena (1970) – Tweet Twig
- What's the Matter with Helen? (1971) – The Tramp
- Minnie and Moskowitz (1971) – Morgan Morgan
- Get to Know Your Rabbit (1972) – Policeman (uncredited)
- The Outfit (1973) – Jake Menner
- Peeper (1976) – Sid
- The Killing of a Chinese Bookie (1976) – Flo
- Chesty Anderson, USN (1976) – Vincent
- Speedtrap (1977) – Loomis
- Tarzana (1978) – Old War Buddy Benny
- Hard Knocks (1979)
- Fast-Walking (1982) – Bullet
- D.C. Cab (1983) – Angel Of Death
- Echo Park (1985) – Vinnie
