= Elliot Ingber =

American musician (1941–2025)

- Also known as: Winged Eel Fingerling
- Born: August 24, 1941
- Died: January 21, 2025 (aged 83)
- Occupation: Guitarist
- Instrument: Guitar
- Formerly of: The Gamblers; Fraternity of Man; The Magic Band; The Mothers of Invention

Elliot Ingber (August 24, 1941 – January 21, 2025) was an American guitarist, best known as a member of Frank Zappa's Mothers of Invention (1965-66), founder of the Fraternity of Man (1968-69), and then a member of Captain Beefheart's Magic Band in 1972-73.

== Biography ==
Ingber grew up in Los Angeles, where he attended Fairfax High School alongside such musicians and later music business figures as Phil Spector, Lou Adler, Bruce Johnston and Sandy Nelson. He played guitar in local bands including Kip Tyler and the Flips, and The Gamblers.

In 1966, he joined Frank Zappa's band the Mothers of Invention and appeared on their debut album Freak Out!. He was fired from the band by Zappa following an incident onstage (according to drummer Jimmy Carl Black) when he tripped on LSD and was unaware that his amplifier was not switched on. After that he co-founded Fraternity of Man, which released two albums. With singer Lawrence "Stash" Wagner, Ingber wrote the track "Don't Bogart Me", later used (as "Don't Bogart That Joint") on the soundtrack of Easy Rider.

He then joined Captain Beefheart's Magic Band under the stage name Winged Eel Fingerling, given to him by Beefheart. In the sleeve notes to The Spotlight Kid (1972), Beefheart likens Ingber to "a chrome black eyebrow / rolled out real long" and also "a paper brow magnifying glass / fried brown, edge scorched, yoked / like a squeak from a speaker / behind forehead of the time." In 1995, Ingber reformed Fraternity of Man with Lawrence "Stash" Wagner, the original vocalist and co-author of "Don't Bogart that Joint", to record and release a third album released under the Malibu Records label.

Ingber later abandoned music and worked as a postman in Los Angeles. He died on January 21, 2025, at the age of 83.

== Discography ==
Year	Artist	Release title	Label
1960	The Gamblers	"Moon Dawg"	World Pacific
1962	Hollywood Gamblers	"Moon Katt"	Don Records
1963	Dee D. Hope	"California Surfer"	Jolum
1963	Bobby James (a/k/a Bobby Jameson)	"Let's Surf" b/w "Take This Lollipop"	Jolum
1966	The Mothers of Invention	Freak Out!	Verve
1968	Fraternity of Man	Fraternity of Man	ABC Records
1969	Michele	Saturn Rings	ABC Records
1969	Fraternity of Man	Get it On!	DOT Records
1969	Canned Heat	Hallelujah	
1969	The Mothers of Invention	Mothermania	Verve
1972	Shakey Jake Harris	The Devil's Harmonica	Polydor
1972	Captain Beefheart	The Spotlight Kid	Reprise
1978	Juicy Groove	First Taste	Payola Records
1978	The Grandmothers	Grandmothers	Rhino Records
1981	Little Feat	"Teenage Nervous Breakdown" on Hoy-Hoy!	Warner Brothers
1982	The Grandmothers	Lookin' Up Granny's Dress	Rhino
1983	The Grandmothers	Fan Club Talk	Panda
1992	Frank Zappa	You Can't Do That on Stage Anymore, Vol. 5	Ryko
1993	Lowell George & The Factory	Lightning-rod Man	Edsel Records
1993	The Grandmothers	A Mother of an Anthology	One Way Records
1995	Fraternity of Man	X	San Francisco Sound
1996	Various Artists	Cowabunga! The Surf Box	Rhino
1996	Frank Zappa	The Lost Episodes	Ryko
1998	Frank Zappa	Mystery Disc	Ryko
1999	Captain Beefheart & His Magic Band	Grow Fins	Revenant Records
2000	Little Feat	"Juliet" on Hotcakes & Outtakes	
2001	Elliot Ingber	The The The The	Dreamsville Records
2006	Frank Zappa	The MOFO Project/Object	Zappa Records
