= America Drinks & Goes Home =

Song by the Mothers of Invention

from the album Absolutely Free
- Released: 1967
- Length: 2:45
- Label: Verve
- Songwriter: Frank Zappa

"America Drinks & Goes Home" is a song written by Frank Zappa and recorded in November 1966 and released in 1967 on the Mothers of Invention album Absolutely Free.

The song appears in two different versions on the album at the beginning of side 2 under the title "America Drinks" and finishing at the end of side 2 under the title "America Drinks & Goes Home".

In between these songs is a sequence containing "Status Back Baby", "Uncle Bernie's Farm", "Son of Suzy Creamcheese" and "Brown Shoes Don't Make It". Zappa's title for the entire piece was "Suite No. 2: The M.O.I. American Pageant (2nd in a Series of Underground Oratorios)". The piece was performed many times during the Mothers of Invention residency at the Garrick Cinema in Greenwich Village in New York City during 1967.
