= Ricky Lancelotti =

American singer

Ricky Lancelotti (August 25, 1944 – April 7, 1980), also known as Rick Lancelot, was a singer best known for his work with Frank Zappa in 1973. Frank Zappa songs featuring Lancelotti's vocals can be found on the albums Over-Nite Sensation, The Lost Episodes and Läther.

== Background ==
Under the stage name of "Rick Lancelot", Lancelotti released several unsuccessful singles for RCA Records in 1965 and 1966. Simultaneously, Lancelotti occasionally appeared on the ABC-TV music series Shindig as the show's "in-house" singer (usually spotlighting the heavier R&B hits of the day).

Lancelotti was featured as one of several uncredited lead vocalists on Hanna-Barbera's 1968–1970 children's program The Banana Splits. His vocal performances also appeared on the Splits' lone album We're the Banana Splits, released by Decca Records in 1968. He also sang with the group Sky Oats, whose music was included in the 1970 surfing documentary Pacific Vibrations.

== Career ==
In 1964, the single " Sick Chick" / "Ain't That Soul" was released by Rick Lancelot and the Peppermint Sticks. Rick Lancelot was Ricky Lancelotti. The single was composed by himself and Lolly Vegas.

He was briefly the lead singer of the band Wolfgang, which featured Leland Sklar as their bass player. However they only ever recorded unreleased demo tracks.

== Death ==
Lancelotti died of an overdose on April 7, 1980, at 35 years old.
