= The World's Greatest Sinner =

1962 film by Timothy Carey

- Ad for initial Los Angeles engagement at the Vista Theatre
- Directed by: Timothy Carey
- Written by: Timothy Carey
- Produced by: Timothy Carey
- Starring: Timothy Carey; Gil Barretto; Betty Rowland; James Farley; Gail Griffin
- Cinematography: Frank Grande; Robert Shelfow; Raymond Steckler; Ove H. Sehested
- Edited by: Carl Mahakian
- Music by: Frank Zappa
- Production company: Frenzy Productions
- Distributed by: Timothy Carey (original release); Absolute Films (re-release)
- Release date: June 1962
- Running time: 82 minutes
- Country: United States
- Language: English

The World's Greatest Sinner is a 1962 American drama film written, directed, and produced by, and starring Timothy Carey. Narrated by voice actor Paul Frees, the film focuses on a frustrated atheist named Clarence Hilliard (later God Hilliard) who rises from insurance salesman to powerful figure, but faces consequences from the real God of the Bible; he alienates his family and friends with his increasing egomania and dictator-like presence.

== Plot ==
The World's Greatest Sinner introduces a frustrated insurance salesman, Clarence, and his family: wife Edna, daughter Betty Hilliard and their son, as well as Clarence's friend, Alonzo.

Clarence Hilliard is dismissed by the manager in an insurance company due to Clarence's disregard for the 'scrape and screw' policy. Clarence confesses to Edna that he wants to become more than 'Clarence' and start a political career, but Edna falls asleep as he is talking. Later, Clarence tells his horse and Alonzo about his ambitions to make humans immortal, and a plan that will make Clarence 'God'. After witnessing an ecstatic crowd at a rockabilly concert, Clarence decides to learn to play the guitar. With the encouragement of Alonzo, Clarence attracts the audiences with his new ideology: that an ordinary person who is now a superhuman being will live forever and become God. Gradually gaining his followers, Clarence proclaims himself 'God Hilliard' and creates a religious cult known as the Eternal Man's Party. In a meeting, the followers consider a few minorities as potential targets for their hatred, but God Hilliard proposes a new way of thinking on "a non-discriminatory basis". Eventually, one of the followers warns God Hilliard that nobody should exert too much power, or one will become a dictator.

God Hilliard finances the cult by seducing elderly widows out of their life savings. Meanwhile, Alonzo builds an image of God Hilliard by using false facial hair, trimmed to a soul patch. God Hilliard forms a band at the venue and performs a rockabilly song, with a spoken motif, 'take my hand', and his outrageous stripping. As he relaxes with a snake after his performance, his followers rebel against a man who berates them and threatens to call the police. The followers gather together, shouting "We want God". The followers later cause a riot, which includes destroying objects such as cars and buildings. God Hilliard meets an ex-follower who experiences a mental breakdown since he alienated his family in favour of following God Hilliard. Hilliard has little sympathy for the ex-follower's disconnection with his family, giving the ex-follower a gun and instructing him to commit suicide.

A bicyclist boy meets Betty and informs her that her father is in trouble, but she is in denial. In a discussion between Edna and God Hilliard, he demands that nobody should be on the top but himself, which alienates Edna. When Betty returns home, she is warned by God Hilliard that she should not tell anyone about his "business" if a guest comes in. God Hilliard's mother arrives to his house for a visit, and questions what he has been doing for the past few days. God Hilliard tells her that he called himself "God", and his mother condemns this practice, which she views as sacrilege.

As the film progresses, God Hilliard sets up a concert tour in the same vein of his first concert appearance and attracts the attention of a political manager, who tells God Hilliard to give up the rockabilly career in favour of being a 'political threat' by smashing his guitar. With the help of the manager, God Hilliard seeks out the nomination for President of the United States, leading a political party named after his cult. Hilliard holds a press conference, but he is not satisfied with the reporters. The film cuts to scenes of God Hilliard seducing and kissing several women, including a 14-year-old minor, and his meeting with the followers of the Eternal Man's Party. God Hilliard tours nationwide in the United States. Despite his proposal that every human being will live forever, God Hilliard learns about his own mother's death during the tour. This death in the family disillusions him. Nonetheless, Alonzo and the members prepare God Hilliard's political speeches, and assure to God Hilliard that he and the party will win the presidency. Later, Alonzo tells God Hilliard that Edna wants to see him, but God Hilliard declines, citing his preoccupation with political matters. His followers inform him that the public is calling him an atheist, and he has to convince the public that he is not one. He leaves the duty of convincing the American public about his religious faith to Alonzo and the members of the cult, who instead tell the publicists that God Hilliard "is the only living creature that you can call a God".

Meanwhile, God Hilliard refuses to let Edna and their children attend a church and accuses Edna of indoctrinating their children. Betty hands God Hilliard the Bible, and he slaps her in retaliation. The incident causes God Hilliard's family to escape from him, and Hilliard enters a period of emotional crisis. His followers discover him crying on his desk. He apologizes to the followers and is left alone, as he strikes a piano note. God Hilliard then voices a challenge to God Almighty; if he is 'mightier than man', he will 'give up everything' for God Almighty. At a church, God Hilliard attends in disguise, but waits until every attendant has left the church. He then steals a piece of sacramental bread from the church. At his house, God Hilliard uncovers his stolen item and wonders what happens if the bread can or cannot bleed. God Hilliard proceeds to pierce the bread, but he joyfully discovers that the bread does not bleed. He then returns to the Eternal Man's Party building. A slime trail appears, which God Hilliard follows. While on the run, God Hilliard comes back to his house and slowly walks to his room. Affected by God Almighty's power, as he enters his room, God Hilliard is therefore defeated in a challenge.

== Cast ==
- Timothy Carey as Clarence "God" Hilliard
- Gil Barretto as Alonzo, Clarence's 'faithful friend' and gardener
- Betty Rowland as Edna Hilliard, Clarence's wife
- James Farley as The Devil
- Gail Griffin as Betty Hilliard, Clarence's daughter
- Grace de Carolis as Clarence's mother
- Victor Floming as The Insurance Boss
- Ann Josephs as Secretary
- Jenny Sanches as The Old Lady in Church
- Paul Frees as The Snake (voice) / Narrator

== Release and reception ==
The World's Greatest Sinner debuted at the Vista Continental Theater in East Hollywood on January 30, 1963. Director Martin Scorsese is one of the film's supporters, having named it as one of his favorite rock and roll films. Musician Will Oldham has also championed the film, and selected it when invited to present a favorite film at the 2001 Maryland Film Festival.

== Production ==
According to Frank Zappa, The World's Greatest Sinner was shot in El Monte, California.

== Soundtrack ==
The film features a score composed by a young, pre-Mothers of Invention Frank Zappa. During a 1963 appearance on The Steve Allen Show, on which he generated musical sounds on bicycles, Zappa talked about scoring the soundtrack for The World's Greatest Sinner, which he called "the world's worst movie," even though the general public would not have the opportunity to see the film he was talking about for another 50 years. During the course of this same interview with Steve Allen, Zappa discusses how he recorded the soundtrack for this film in the Little Theatre, located at Chaffey College in Alta Loma, California, along with the plethora of instruments used.

Excerpts of The World's Greatest Sinner's soundtrack were popular among certain bootleggers, and, subsequently, in 2009 were officially made available by Zappa Records on disc three of Beat the Boots! III.

The film's title track and theme music, however, was eventually released by Donna Records as the B-side to the Baby Ray & The Ferns single "How's Your Bird?" in April 1963, with both songs being in turn later included on the compilation albums Rare Meat: The Early Works of Frank Zappa (1983) and Cucamonga (1998).

=== Legacy ===
The influence of The World's Greatest Sinner on certain compositions in various later works, Mothers and non-Mothers, by Zappa can be felt in the reutilization of certain motifs from its soundtrack in such compositions as "Oh No" from Lumpy Gravy (1967) and Weasels Ripped My Flesh (1970), the second part of "Dog Breath" on Uncle Meat (1969), the Meat Light (2016) track "Blood Unit", and the Burnt Weeny Sandwich (1970) instrumentals "Overture To A Holiday In Berlin" and "Holiday In Berlin, Full-Blown". In turn, starting with its One Size Fits All (1975) incarnation, "Inca Roads" would borrow certain The World's Greatest Sinner motifs via the two "Holiday In Berlin" tracks to provide a transition from the guitar solo into the middle verse, motifs that are also quoted in "Strictly Genteel" from the film 200 Motels (1971).
