= Bill Miller (artist) =

American artist

Bill Miller is an American artist best known for his work with discarded linoleum as his medium. He was born in Cleveland in 1962. Both his grandfather, a coal miner, and his father, a factory worker, died in work-related accidents when he was young. He attended the Art Institute of Pittsburgh, where he focused on graphic design. He currently resides in Pittsburgh.

== Career ==
=== Early career ===
Early in his career, Miller worked in more traditional media, primarily oil painting, acrylic painting and printmaking. In the early 1990s, while working as the art director for In Pittsburgh Newsweekly, he co-founded the Industrial Arts Co-op. The activist collective experimented with trash or junk art, a subset of found object art made from objects and materials that have been thrown away. The group broke into abandoned buildings, mostly steel mills, where they exhibited art made from scavenged materials.

During his participation with the collective, Miller began salvaging discarded linoleum flooring from dumpsters on Pittsburgh's South Side. He created framed portraits, landscapes and other works by cutting and trimming the linoleum and fashioning collages.

=== Linoleum art ===
Finer Moments album cover

Miller's initial showings at exhibits in Pittsburgh and elsewhere generated Interest in his linoleum works. In 1997, he relocated to New York, where he was art director of the weekly Long Island Voice and, after it folded, a designer at The Village Voice. He continued to work in linoleum during this time, and by 2002 was concentrating fulltime on producing art from discarded linoleum. Miller has cited Vincent van Gogh and Salvador Dalí as among his influences. His early themes were often dark, influenced by deaths in his family and the decline of the industrial cities in which Miller lived. As his work evolved, he branched out thematically. He produced landscapes, still-life studies, religious themed art, portraits of rock stars (notably The Beatles and Frank Zappa) and depictions of major events such as the sinking of the Titanic and the attack on the Twin Towers in New York. His portraits of Mothers of Invention founder Frank Zappa attracted the attention of Zappa’s wife, Gail Zappa, resulting in the commissioning of two album covers by Miller, Congress Shall Make No Law..., and Finer Moments. He created the poster image for the 2012 Woodstock Film Festival.

=== Exhibitions ===
Miller's linoleum art has appeared in exhibits in Columbus, OH, New York, Los Angeles, Philadelphia, Seattle, and New Orleans. A retrospective of his work was held in Pittsburgh in 2007. The New York city gallery dieFirma, an artist-run platform and gallery anchored in New York’s Cooper Square, has held several exhibitions of his works, including a one-artist show in the fourth quarter of 2026. Internationally, it has been shown in London, U.K. and at the annual Drap Art exhibit in Barcelona, Spain. He is represented by the Lindsay Gallery in Columbus, Ohio.
