= Linda Gaye Scott =

American actress

- Occupation: Actress
- Years active: 1963–1983

Linda Gaye Scott is a retired American actress.

== Music career ==
In 1963, Linda Gaye Scott appeared on the cover of Jan and Dean's second album "Jan and Dean Take Linda Surfin'." Another photo from the same session was used for their "Surf City" 45 picture sleeve. The following year she made her own record, "Joey's Last Big Game" b/w "The Spark that Flamed The Fire" for Apogee Records. (The single did not chart.)

== Discography ==
=== Singles ===
- 1964: "Joey's Last Big Game" b/w "The Spark that Flamed The Fire" (Apogee Records A-1-2) mono

== Television career ==
In 1965 Linda was cast as the voluptuous Patty Cromwell, Gidget's nemesis on "The War Between Men, Women and Gidget" episode of Gidget.

She was cast as a beautifully charming model, Buffy Baker, in a Bewitched episode entitled, "Three Wishes", that aired on February 9, 1967.

From then on Linda became a fixture on television throughout the 1960s and 1970s, appearing in numerous TV series, including Batman; The Green Hornet; Bonanza; The Man from U.N.C.L.E.; Lost in Space; Love, American Style; Columbo; and others.

== Filmography ==
=== Cinema ===
- 1965: Run Home, Slow (by Ted Brenner) as Julie Ann Hagen
- 1968: The Party (by Blake Edwards) as Starlet
- 1968: Psych-Out (by Richard Rush) as Lynn
- 1970: Little Fauss and Big Halsy (by Sidney J. Furie) as Moneth
- 1972: Hammersmith Is Out (by Peter Ustinov) as Miss Quim
- 1973: Westworld (by Michael Crichton) as Arlette

=== Television ===
==== Television series ====
- 1965: My Living Doll: The Lie (Season 1 Episode 19): Monica Bird
- 1965: My Favorite Martian: Bottled Martian (Season 3 Episode 8): Nadja
- 1965: Ben Casey: The Importance of Being 65937 (Season 5 Episode 10): Dora McFadden
- 1965: Gidget: The War Between Men, Women and Gidget (season 1 episode 13): Patty Cromwell
- 1965: The Donna Reed Show: How to Handle a Woman (season 8 episode 16): Deborah
- 1965: The Man from U.N.C.L.E: The Very Important Zombie Affair (Season 2 Episode 15): Suzy
- 1966: Mister Roberts: The World's Greatest Lover (Season 1 Episode 19)
- 1966: Batman: The Ring of Wax (season 1 episode 23): Moth
- 1966: Batman: The Torture Chamber: Give 'Em the Axe (season 1 episode 24): Moth
- 1966: Occasional Wife: Occasional Trouble (Season 1 Episode 2): Miss Wilson
- 1966: Occasional Wife: Peter by Moonlight (season 1 episode 15): Miss Wilson
- 1967: Occasional Wife: Alias Peter Patterson (season 1 episode 16): Miss Wilson
- 1967: Bewitched: Greeting Trap (Three Wishes) (Season 3 episode 22): Buffy
- 1967: The Green Hornet: Invasion from Outer Space - Part 1 (Season 1 Episode 25): Vama
- 1967: The Green Hornet: Invasion from Outer Space - Part 2 (Season 1 Episode 26): Vama
- 1967: Hey, Landlord: Who Came to Dinner The Man (Season 1 Episode 30): Julie
- 1967: Lost in Space: Collision of the Planets (Season 3 Episode 9): Alien Girl
- 1971: Bonanza: Another Ben (A Deck Of Aces) (Season 12 Episode 18): Dixie Wells
- 1972: Love, American Style: Love and the Woman in White (Season 4 Episode 11): Veronica La Rue
- 1975: Columbo: Forgotten Lady (Season 5 Episode 1): Alma
- 1985: Archie Bunker's Place: The Boys' Night Out (Season 4 Episode 18): Woman #3
- 2022: Reanimation Team: voice of Galactic Angel

==== TV Movies ====
- 1972: Rolling Man by Peter Hyams, as Crystal
- 1973: Old Faithful by Jørn Winther: Councilman Herbert Zucker
