= The Lost Episodes =

- Cover art designed by Gábor Csupó

Compilation album by Frank Zappa
- Released: February 27, 1996
- Recorded: 1958–1992
- Genre: Rock
- Length: 71:14
- Label: Rykodisc
- Producer: Frank Zappa

Frank Zappa chronology
| Civilization Phaze III (1994) | The Lost Episodes (1996) | Läther (1996) |

Professional ratings
Review scores
| Source | Rating |
|---|---|
| AllMusic | 4/5 stars |
| The Guardian | 4/5 stars |
| Entertainment Weekly | (B+) |

The Lost Episodes is a 1996 posthumous album by Frank Zappa which compiles (with the exception of "I Don't Want to Get Drafted" and "Any Way the Wind Blows") previously unreleased material. Much of the material covered dates from early in his career, and as early as 1958, into the mid-1970s. Zappa had been working on these tracks in the years before his death in 1993.

== Album content ==
The album has five tracks which feature Captain Beefheart (known in early recordings by his birth name, Don Vliet, and later Don Van Vliet): "Lost in a Whirlpool", a blues parody from around 1958–59 in which Beefheart sings of being flushed down the toilet; "Tiger Roach", a rhythm and blues track from around three years later; "I'm a Band Leader" from 1969, a spoken word piece written by Zappa and read by Beefheart; "Alley Cat", a blues number in which Zappa plays guitar with two members of Beefheart's Magic Band, and "The Grand Wazoo", a spoken word piece recorded in 1969, to which Zappa added a Synclavier track in 1992 . Dan Glaister, writing in The Guardian, judged the first to be "a passable Bessie Smith cover", adding, "while "Alley Cat" could be a missing track from Clear Spot."

Elsewhere on the disc are included a number of alternate, earlier versions of compositions which were later released on Zappa's studio albums. The Lost Episodes' version of "Any Way the Wind Blows", for instance, was recorded in Cucamonga in around 1963—three years before its appearance on Freak Out! (1966). And the version of "Fountain of Love" here was recorded around the same time, but not released until Cruising with Ruben & the Jets (1968). Several outtakes include the original versions of: "Inca Roads" and "RDNZL", along with a version of "Wino Man" featuring Ricky Lancelotti on lead vocals. The final track is the original version of "Sharleena" from the aborted 2nd Hot Rats LP recordings in 1970; featuring Sugarcane Harris on lead vocal. "I Don't Want to Get Drafted" appears on this album in a slightly different version than the one released on the original single from 1980.

"The Big Squeeze" was recorded in 1967 for a Luden's cough drops television commercial. Zappa's music was matched with animation by filmmaker Ed Seeman and the advertisement won a Clio Award for "Best Use of Sound". The version on this album lacks the narration later added by Seeman.

Some of the tracks had been previously released on the Mystery Discs, which were originally part of the first two Old Masters box set and were released together on a single CD in 1998. "Run Home Slow" is heard in stereo on The Lost Episodes but in mono on Mystery Disc (and probably a different take). "Charva" is heard in mono on The Lost Episodes but in stereo on Mystery Disc. "Wedding Dress Song" and Handsome Cabin Boy" are the same versions as on Mystery Disc but on the latter album the two songs feature as one track.

== Track listing ==
All tracks are written by Frank Zappa, except where noted.

| No. | Title | Recording details | Length |
|---|---|---|---|
| 1. | "The Blackouts" | c. 1958 | 0:22 |
| 2. | "Lost in a Whirlpool" (Don Van Vliet, Zappa) | Antelope Valley College, c. 1958 | 2:46 |
| 3. | "Ronnie Sings?" | Home recording, c. 1961-1962 | 1:05 |
| 4. | "Kenny's Booger Story" | Home recording, c. 1961-1962 | 0:33 |
| 5. | "Ronnie's Booger Story" | Home recording, c. 1961-1962 | 1:16 |
| 6. | "Mount St. Mary's Concert Excerpt" | Mount St. Mary's College, May 19, 1963 | 2:28 |
| 7. | "Take Your Clothes Off When You Dance" | Pal Recording Studio, January 1961 | 3:51 |
| 8. | "Tiger Roach" (Van Vliet, Zappa) | Pal Recording Studio, c. late 1964 | 2:20 |
| 9. | "Run Home, Slow Theme" | Original Sound, c. 1964 | 1:25 |
| 10. | "Fountain of Love" (Zappa, Ray Collins) | Pal Recording Studio, March 1963 | 2:08 |
| 11. | "Run Home Cues, #2" | Original Sound, c. 1964 | 0:28 |
| 12. | "Any Way the Wind Blows" | Pal Recording Studio, March 1963 | 2:14 |
| 13. | "Run Home Cues, #3" | Original Sound, c. 1964 | 0:11 |
| 14. | "Charva" (Previously on Mystery Disc in mono) | Original Sound, c. 1964 | 1:59 |
| 15. | "The Dick Kunc Story" | We're Only In It For The Money outtake, Apostolic Recording Studio, 1967-1968 | 0:46 |
| 16. | "Wedding Dress Song" (Trad., arr. Zappa) | Apostolic Recording Studio, 1968 | 1:14 |
| 17. | "Handsome Cabin Boy" (Trad., arr. Zappa) | Apostolic Recording Studio, 1968 | 1:21 |
| 18. | "Cops & Buns" (Extended version later released on Meat Light) | Apostolic Recording Studio, 1968 | 2:36 |
| 19. | "The Big Squeeze" (Later released on Finer Moments) | Mayfair Studios, July-September 1967 | 0:43 |
| 20. | "I'm a Band Leader" | Unknown location, 1969 | 1:14 |
| 21. | "Alley Cat" (Van Vliet, Zappa) | Basement recording, 1969 | 2:47 |
| 22. | "The Grand Wazoo" | 1969 (vocals), 1992 (synclavier) | 2:12 |
| 23. | "Wonderful Wino" (Zappa, Jeff Simmons) | Over-Nite Sensation outtake Bolic Sound, May 30 & June 1, 1973 | 2:47 |
| 24. | "Kung Fu" | Bolic Sound, December 12, 1973 | 1:06 |
| 25. | "RDNZL" | Over-Nite Sensation outtake Bolic Sound, March 20, 1973; Whitney Studios, April 4, 1973 | 3:49 |
| 26. | "Basement Music #1" | Basement recording, c. 1978 | 3:46 |
| 27. | "Inca Roads" | Over-Nite Sensation outtake Bolic Sound, March 20, 1973; Whitney Studios, April 3, 1973 | 3:42 |
| 28. | "Lil' Clanton Shuffle" (Later released on The Hot Rats Sessions) | T.T.G. Studios, July 29, 1969 (basic track); Whitney Studios, 1972 (overdub) | 4:47 |
| 29. | "I Don't Wanna Get Drafted" (Re-recorded for You Are What You Is as "Drafted Again") | Non-album single, 1980 | 3:24 |
| 30. | "Sharleena" (Other takes on Funky Nothingness) | The Record Plant, March 4 & 11, 1970 | 11:54 |

== Personnel ==
- Frank Zappa – synthesizer, guitar, percussion, piano, celeste, drums, bass guitar, kazoo, vocals, background vocals, synclavier
- Dale Bozzio – vocals
- Terry Bozzio – vocals
- Captain Beefheart (Don Van Vliet) – vocals
- Ray Collins – vocals
- Ricky Lancelotti – vocals
- Ray White – vocals
- Kenny Williams – vocals
- Ronnie Williams – vocals
- Ronny Williams – vocals
- Ike Willis – vocals
- Elliot Ingber – slide guitar
- Elwood Madeo Jr. – guitar
- Bobby Zappa – guitar, rhythm guitar
- George Duke – keyboards
- Tommy Mars – keyboards, vocals
- Don Preston – keyboards
- Danny Helferin – piano
- Terry Wimberly – piano
- Arthur Barrow – bass, bass guitar
- Max Bennett – bass, bass guitar
- Erroneous (aka Alex Dmochowski) – bass, bass guitar
- Roy Estrada – bass, bass guitar
- Tom Fowler – bass guitar
- Jimmy Carl Black – drums
- Vinnie Colaiuta – drums
- Aynsley Dunbar – drums
- John French – drums
- John Guerin – drums
- Ralph Humphrey – drums
- Chester Thompson – drums
- Tony Rodriguez – alto sax
- Chuck Foster – trumpet
- Sal Marquez – trumpet
- Bruce Fowler – trombone
- Don "Sugarcane" Harris – violin, vocals, electric violin
- Jean-Luc Ponty – violin
- Art Tripp – marimba, background vocals, vibraphone
- Ian Underwood – percussion, keyboards, saxophone, woodwind, fender rhodes
- Ruth Underwood – percussion

== Production ==
- Frank Zappa – arranger, producer, engineer
- Paul Buff – engineer
- Gary Kellgren – engineer
- Kerry McNabb – engineer
- Bob Stone – engineer, remixing
- Spencer Chrislu – remixing
- Gábor Csupó – artwork
- Steven Jurgensmeyer – design
- Hal Wilson – photography
- Rip Rense – liner notes
