= Tweet's Ladies of Pasadena =

- Directed by: Timothy Carey
- Written by: Timothy Carey
- Produced by: Timothy Carey; Romeo Carey
- Starring: Timothy Carey; Jenny Jackson; Frank Buchanan; Romeo Carey
- Cinematography: Russ Kingston
- Release date: 1979
- Running time: 70 minutes
- Country: United States
- Language: English

Tweet's Ladies of Pasadena is a 1979 cult film written, produced, directed and starring Timothy Carey.

The film was originally shot as a pilot for a potential television series.

== Premise ==
A man, Tweet, is a member of a roller skating knitting club for old ladies.
