= Carnegie Hall (Frank Zappa album) =

2011 live album by Frank Zappa and the Mothers of Invention

Live album by Frank Zappa and The Mothers of Invention
- Released: October 31, 2011
- Recorded: October 11, 1971
- Venue: Carnegie Hall (New York City)
- Genre: Rock
- Length: 215:42
- Label: Vaulternative Records; Catalog Number: VR 2011-1

Frank Zappa and The Mothers of Invention chronology
Feeding the Monkies at Ma Maison (2011)	Carnegie Hall (2011)	Road Tapes, Venue #1 (2012)

Carnegie Hall is a quadruple live album by Frank Zappa and The Mothers of Invention, released posthumously on October 31, 2011, by the Zappa Family Trust on Vaulternative Records. It is a mono recording of the two shows given on October 11, 1971 at Carnegie Hall in New York City and the sixth installment on the Vaulternative Records label that is dedicated to the posthumous release of complete Zappa concerts, following the releases of FZ:OZ (2002), Buffalo (2007), Wazoo (2007), Philly '76 (2009) and Hammersmith Odeon (2010).

The album was re-released on April 3, 2020, as a 3-CD set, omitting the performance of the support act, The Persuasions, which was originally included on the 2011 4-CD version.

== History ==
This is the official release of the live recording of Frank Zappa & the Mothers of Invention's debut (and only two) performances at the titular New York City's Carnegie Hall on October 11, 1971.

== Track listing ==
All tracks are written by Frank Zappa, except where noted.

Disc one The Persuasions (support act) Show 1
No.	Title	Writer(s)	Length
1.	"I Just Can't Work No Longer"	Curtis Mayfield, Jerry Butler	2:32
2.	"Working All the Live Long Day/Chain Gang"	Trad./Sam Cooke	2:20
3.	"Medley No. 1"	(*)	7:28
4.	"Pieces of a Man"	Jerry Galen Foster, Wilburn Rice	2:53
5.	"Buffalo Soldier"	David Barnes, Margaret Ann Lewis, Mira Ann Smith	4:33
6.	"Medley No. 2"	(*)	2:36
7.	"Medley No. 3"	(*)	3:14
Total length:			25:36

FZ Show 1
No.	Title	Writer(s)	Length
8.	"Hello (To FOH)/Ready?! (To the Band)"		1:03
9.	"Call Any Vegetable"		10:36
10.	"Any Way the Wind Blows"		4:00
11.	"Magdalena"	Frank Zappa/Howard Kaylan	6:08
12.	"Dog Breath"		5:41
Total length:			27:28

Disc two FZ Show 1 (continued)
No.	Title	Length
1.	"Peaches en Regalia"	4:24
2.	"Tears Began to Fall"	2:32
3.	"She Painted Up Her Face/Half a Dozen Provocative Squats/Shove It Right In"	6:32
4.	"King Kong"	30:25
5.	"200 Motels Finale"	3:41
6.	"Who Are the Brain Police?"	7:08
Total length:		54:41

Disc three FZ Show 2
No.	Title	Writer(s)	Length
1.	"Auspicious Occasion"		2:45
2.	"Divan: Once Upon a Time"		5:40
3.	"Divan: Sofa #1"		3:11
4.	"Divan: Magic Pig"		1:43
5.	"Divan: Stick It Out"		4:54
6.	"Divan: Divan Ends Here"		4:17
7.	"Pound for a Brown"		6:03
8.	"Sleeping in a Jar"		2:46
9.	"Wonderful Wino"	Frank Zappa/Jeff Simmons	5:46
10.	"Sharleena"		4:52
11.	"Cruising for Burgers"		3:17
Total length:			45:13

Disc four FZ Show 2 (continued)
No.	Title	Length
1.	"Billy the Mountain – Part 1"	28:33
2.	"Billy the Mountain – The Carnegie Solos"	13:31
3.	"Billy the Mountain – Part 2"	5:37
4.	"The $600 Mud Shark Prelude"	1:27
5.	"The Mud Shark"	13:35
Total length:		62:42

For the 2020 3CD release, CD 1 is Disc 1–8 to 2–4 (total length: 70:31), and CD 2 is Disc 2–5 to 3–11 (56:57). On this version, "Dog Breath" is 5:54, "Peaches en Regalia" is 4:04, "King Kong" is 29:43 and "200 Motels Finale" is 4:36.

== Credits ==
Produced/Performed/Conducted by Frank Zappa

(*)

- Medley #1: "Sunday Kind of Love" (Barbara Belle, Anita Nye, Louis Prima, Stanley Rhodes) / "Sincerely" (Harvey Fuqua, Alan Freed) / "A Thousand Miles Away" (William Henry Miller, James Sheppard) / "The Vow" (Zeke Carey, George Motola, Horace Webb) / "Why Don't You Write Me?" (Laura Grace Hollins) / "Goodnight Sweetheart, Goodnight" (Calvin Carter, James Hudson) / "Woo Woo Train" (Richard Barrett) / "I Only Have Eyes for You" (Al Dubin, Harry Warren) / "Creation of Love" (Richard Barrett, Stuart Wiener) / "Tears on My Pillow" (Al Lewis, Sylvester Bradford) / "The Great Pretender" (Buck Ram)
- Medley #2: "Don't Look Back" (William Robinson, Ronald A. White) / "Runaway Child, Running Wild" (Barrett Strong, Norman Whitfield) / "Cloud Nine" (Barrett Strong, Norman Whitfield)
- Medley #3: "He Ain't Heavy, He's My Brother" (Sidney Keith Russell, Robert William Scott) / "You've Got a Friend" (Carole King) / "Reach Out and Touch Somebody's Hand" (Nickolas Ashford, Valerie Simpson)

== Personnel ==
- Frank Zappa – lead guitar, vocals
- Mark Volman – vocals, percussion
- Howard Kaylan – vocals
- Ian Underwood – keyboards, alto sax
- Don Preston – keyboards, gong
- Jim Pons – bass, vocals
- Aynsley Dunbar – drums

== Overlaps with other albums ==
- Finer Moments
  - Longer versions of "Pound For A Brown" and "King Kong" are included on the track "The Subcutaneous Peril"
