= Peaches en Regalia =

1969 composition by Frank Zappa

Single by Frank Zappa

from the album Hot Rats
- B-side: "I'm Not Satisfied"; "Lucille Has Messed My Mind Up"
- Released: August 2, 1987
- Recorded: July 28, 1969; August 26, 1969
- Genre: Jazz fusion, instrumental rock, progressive rock
- Length: 3:37
- Label: Rykodisc
- Songwriter: Frank Zappa
- Producer: Frank Zappa

Frank Zappa singles chronology
"The Girl in the Magnesium Dress" (1984)	"Peaches en Regalia" (1987)	"Sexual Harassment in the Workplace" (1988)

Official Audio
- "Peaches en Regalia" on YouTube

"Peaches en Regalia" is an instrumental jazz fusion composition by Frank Zappa. It was initially released on Zappa's album Hot Rats in 1969 and has been recorded many times since.

== Other versions ==
Years later, in 1987, the piece was released as a CD single to promote Rykodisc's Zappa CD reissue campaign. Zappa used the piece on many of his tours, often as either the opening or the encore of a show.

"Peaches en Regalia" has been included in the "underground" version of The Real Book, despite being compositionally more complicated than typical jam session tunes. Having a song included in the book has been described as "the ultimate insider credential for a jazz composer".

The tune is used as instrumental background music on the BBC London radio programme presented by Danny Baker, as well as the Elis James and John Robins show on BBC Radio 5 Live. It was also the theme tune for the early 1970s BBC2 show One Man's Week.

A recording of the piece by Zappa Plays Zappa (including Zappa's son Dweezil and Zappa alumni Steve Vai and Napoleon Murphy Brock), won a Grammy Award for Best Rock Instrumental Performance in February 2009.

== Personnel ==
- Frank Zappa – octave bass, guitar, percussion
- Ian Underwood – keyboards, flute, saxophone, clarinet
- Shuggie Otis – bass
- Ron Selico – drums

== Renditions ==
=== By Zappa ===
Year	Album	Notes
1969	Hot Rats	
1971	Fillmore East – June 1971	Live (as "Peaces En Regalia" on original vinyl album art)
1981	Tinsel Town Rebellion	Live as "Peaches III"
1991	Anyway the Wind Blows	Recorded live in 1979, released as part of the Beat the Boots series.
1992	Swiss Cheese/Fire!	Recorded live in 1971, released as part of the Beat the Boots II series.
2010	Hammersmith Odeon	Recorded live in 1978 at the famous London venue.
2011	Carnegie Hall	Recorded live in 1971.
2022	The Mothers 1971	Recorded live in 1971, in 6 versions

=== On tribute albums ===
Year	Performer	Album
1994	The Muffin Men	Say Cheese & Thank You
1994	Riccardo Fassi Tankio	Plays the Music of Frank Zappa
1995	Harmonia	Harmonia Meets Zappa
1996	Omnibus Wind Ensemble	Music by Frank Zappa
1997	Ed Palermo	Ed Palermo Big Band Plays the Music of Frank Zappa
1999	The Dangerous Kitchen	Pays Tribute to Frank Zappa
2004	Ensemble Modern	Ensemble Modern Plays Frank Zappa
2004	The Muffin Men	Bakers Dozen
2004	Pollo Del Mar	Lemme Take You to the Beach (Various artists)
2005	Colin Towns	Frank Zappa's Hot Licks
2013	The Norwegian Wind Ensemble	The Brass From Utopia

=== Other versions ===
Year	Performer	Album
1994	Jon Poole	What's the Ugliest Part of Your Body?
1995	Meridian Arts Ensemble	Prime Meridian
2000	Dixie Dregs	California Screamin'
2000	The Grandmothers	Eating the Astoria
2006	Dweezil Zappa	Go with What You Know
2006	Daniele Sepe	Suonarne 1 per educarne 100
2007	Phish	Vegas 96
2009	Les cris de Paris (a cappella)	Encores (alpha)
2011	Phish	2011/07/01 I Super Ball IX, NY
2015	Dr. Zilog	Apothecary
2022	Orchestra of the Swan, Philip Sheppard (conductor), David Le Page (solo violin)	Echoes

== Legacy ==
Don Miguel Vilanova (aka Botafogo), an Argentine blues musician, had a band in the late 1980s, inspired by the blues and specifically Zappa's song "Peaches en Regalia", the name of which was translated literally into the Spanish as "Durazno de Gala".
