= Pal Recording Studio =

1950s/1960s California, U.S. recording studio

Coordinates: 34.0685°N 117.5932°W

Pal Recording Studio (1957–1964) was an independent recording studio that operated in Cucamonga, California, an unincorporated community in San Bernardino County that later merged with the communities of Alta Loma, and Etiwanda to form Rancho Cucamonga. The studio was started by engineer/innovator Paul Buff. It was known for its instrumental Surf music recordings such as "Wipe Out" and the original demo recording of "Pipeline". It was located first at 8020 North Archibald Avenue and later moved a few doors down to 8040.

Pal was also the training ground for a young Frank Zappa who worked at the studio starting in 1961. Zappa learned basic recording techniques at Pal. He recorded his first rock n' roll record, "Breaktime", by the Masters, which consisted of himself, Paul Buff, and Ronnie Williams. In 1964, Zappa bought the studio and renamed it Studio Z. Zappa lived at the studio building for a few months before it was closed in 1965. The building had to be torn down in order to widen North Archibald Avenue.

Zappa made many other recordings at the studio. Some were released by small Los Angeles record companies, such as Original Sound. Other recordings were kept in his vault and released on albums such as Lumpy Gravy (1968), Mystery Disc (1985), The Lost Episodes (1996), Cucamonga (1998) and Joe's Xmasage (2005).

Paul Buff engineered the original demo recording of "Pipeline" by the Chantays and "Wipe Out" by the Surfaris using his unique custom built recording machine, which recorded 5 tracks on 1/2 inch recording tape. Buff went on to invent the Kepex, an acronym for KEyable Program EXpander (the opposite of an audio compressor). Paul Buff's Allison Research studio processors became common on pop recordings (Alan Parsons would use a Kepexed drum sound to create the 'heartbeat' heard on Pink Floyd's The Dark Side of the Moon.)

In 2012, Crossfire Productions (in partnership with Buff) released a five CD collection containing 156 of Buff's PAL recordings entitled 'Paul Buff Presents: Highlights From the Pal And Original Sound Studio Archives'. The collection featured 58 Zappa-involved recordings including an early version of Why Don't You Do Me Right? (which later appeared in 1967 as the A-side of a Mothers Of Invention single) and the previously unreleased Zappa novelty song, "Masked Grandma".

Other notable musicians/bands that recorded at Pal Recording Studio:

- The Tornadoes
- Dino Dupree and the Pharaohs
- Conrad and the Hurricane Strings

Notable songs:

- "Wipe Out" - The Surfaris
- "Pipeline" - The Chantays (Demo)
- "Tijuana Surf" - The Hollywood Persuaders (a Zappa production, which was a hit record in Mexico)
- "Grunion Run" - The Hollywood Persuaders (another Zappa production)
