= You Can't Do That on Stage Anymore, Vol. 5 =

Live album by Frank Zappa
- Released: July 10, 1992
- Recorded: June 1966–July 1969 (Disc one); May 30–July 14, 1982 (Disc two)
- Genres: Hard rock; jazz fusion; rock and roll; experimental rock
- Length: 140:45
- Label: Rykodisc
- Producer: Frank Zappa

Frank Zappa chronology
You Can't Do That on Stage Anymore, Vol. 4 (1991)	You Can't Do That on Stage Anymore, Vol. 5 (1992)	You Can't Do That on Stage Anymore, Vol. 6 (1992)

Professional ratings
Review scores
Source	Rating
AllMusic	4/5 stars

You Can't Do That on Stage Anymore, Vol. 5 is a double compact disc collection of live recordings (except for "German Lunch" and "My Guitar" which are studio recordings) by Frank Zappa. Disc one comprises performances by the original Mothers of Invention, spanning the period from 1965 to 1969. "My Guitar" had been previously released as a single in 1969. Disc two comprises performances from the summer 1982 tour of Europe. It was released in 1992 (see 1992 in music) under the label Rykodisc. The last track on this collection ends with Zappa's anger at some audience members tossing cigarettes on stage; after a warning to stop was not obeyed, the disc ends with Zappa stating, "Houselights! The concert's over!"

== Track listing ==
All tracks are written by Frank Zappa, except where noted.

Disc one
No.	Title	Recording date and venue	Length
1.	"The Downtown Talent Scout"	Fillmore Auditorium, June 24–25, 1966	4:01
2.	"Charles Ives"	McMillin Theater, February 14, 1969	4:37
3.	"Here Lies Love" (Martin, Dobard)	McMillin Theater, February 14, 1969	2:44
4.	"Piano/Drum Duet"	The Ark, July 8, 1969	1:57
5.	"Mozart Ballet" (Zappa, Wolfgang Amadeus Mozart)	Royal Albert Hall, June 6, 1969	4:05
6.	"Chocolate Halvah" (Lowell George, Roy Estrada, Zappa)	Thee Image, February 7–9, 1969	3:25
7.	"JCB & Kansas on the Bus #1" (Kanzus, Jimmy Carl Black, Kunc, Barber)	Greyhound Tour Bus Interior, 1969	1:03
8.	"Run Home, Slow: Main Title Theme"	McMillin Theater, February 14, 1969	1:16
9.	"The Little March"	McMillin Theater, February 14, 1969	1:20
10.	"Right There" (Estrada, Zappa)	Thee Image, February 7–9, 1969; Criteria Studios, February, 1969	5:10
11.	"Where Is Johnny Velvet?"	The Factory, February 28, 1969	0:48
12.	"Return of the Hunch-Back Duke"	The Factory, February 28, 1969	1:44
13.	"Trouble Every Day"	The Factory, February 28, 1969	4:06
14.	"Proto-Minimalism"	McMillin Theater, February 14, 1969	1:41
15.	"JCB & Kansas on the Bus #2" (Kanzus, Black, Kunc, Barber)	Greyhound Tour Bus Interior, 1969	1:06
16.	"My Head?" (Mothers of Invention)	Sunset Sound Studios, September 10, 1968 (Art Tripp's birthday)	1:22
17.	"Meow"	Whisky à Go-Go, July 23, 1968	1:23
18.	"Baked-Bean Boogie"	The Ark, July 8, 1969	3:26
19.	"Where's Our Equipment?"	Falkoner Theatret, October 1, 1967	2:29
20.	"FZ/JCB Drum Duet" (Black, Zappa)	Fillmore East, February 21, 1969	4:26
21.	"No Waiting for the Peanuts to Dissolve"	Thee Image, February 7–9, 1969	4:45
22.	"A Game of Cards" (Zappa, Motorhead Sherwood, Art Tripp, Ian Underwood)	Dressing Room, Providence, Rhode Island, July 5, 1969	0:44
23.	"Underground Freak-Out Music"	Thee Image, February 7–9, 1969	3:51
24.	"German Lunch" (Mothers of Invention)	Criteria Studios, February, 1969	6:43
25.	"My Guitar Wants to Kill Your Mama"	A & R Studios, June, 1969	2:11

Disc two
No.	Title	Recording date and venue	Length
1.	"Easy Meat"	Les Arenes, May 29, 1982; Patinoire des Vernets, July 1, 1982; Stadio Luigi Ferraris, July 5, 1982	7:38
2.	"The Dead Girls of London" (Zappa, L. Shankar)	Patinoire des Vernets, July 1, 1982	2:29
3.	"Shall We Take Ourselves Seriously?"	Patinoire des Vernets, July 1, 1982	1:44
4.	"What's New in Baltimore?"	Patinoire des Vernets, July 1, 1982; Stadio Luigi Ferraris, July 5, 1982	5:03
5.	"Moggio"	Patinoire des Vernets, July 1, 1982	2:29
6.	"Dancin' Fool"	Patinoire des Vernets, July 1, 1982	3:12
7.	"RDNZL"	Patinoire des Vernets, July 1, 1982; Stadio Comunale La Favorita, July 14, 1982; Ex Mattatoio di Testaccio, July 9, 1982	7:58
8.	"Advance Romance"	La Patinoire, June 1, 1982	7:01
9.	"City of Tiny Lites"	Hammersmith Odeon, June 19, 1982; Les Arenes, May 30, 1982; Grugahalle, June 10, 1982; Stadio Comunale, July 3, 1982	10:38
10.	"A Pound for a Brown on the Bus"	Stadio Comunale, July 3, 1982	8:38
11.	"Doreen"	Alte Oper, June 11, 1982; Olympiahalle, June 26, 1982	1:58
12.	"Black Page, No. 2"	Olympiahalle, June 26, 1982	9:56
13.	"Geneva Farewell"	Patinoire des Vernets, July 1, 1982	1:38

== Personnel ==
- Frank Zappa – conductor, guitar, lyricist, remixing, producer, main performer, liner notes, vocals
- Dick Kunc – vocals, voices, engineer
- Kanzus J. Kanzus – vocals, voices
- Dick Barber – vocals, voices, sound effects
- Lowell George – guitar, vocals
- Ray White – guitar, vocals
- Steve Vai – guitar
- Elliot Ingber – guitar
- Tommy Mars – keyboards, vocals
- Don Preston – electronics, keyboards
- Roy Estrada – bass guitar, vocals
- Scott Thunes – bass guitar
- Billy Mundi – drums
- Art Tripp – drums
- Chad Wackerman – drums
- Jimmy Carl Black – drums, vocals, voices
- Ed Mann – percussion
- Ray Collins – tambourine
- Ian Underwood – clarinet, alto saxophone, electric piano, piano
- Bobby Martin – saxophone, vocals, keyboards
- Bunk Gardner – tenor saxophone, trumpet
- Motorhead Sherwood – baritone saxophone, vocals
- Noel Redding – dancer
- John Judnich – engineer
- Bob Stone – remixing
