= Absolutely Free =

Album by The Mothers of Invention

Studio album by the Mothers of Invention
- Released: May 26, 1967
- Recorded: November 15–18, 1966; March 6, 1967
- Studios: TTG, Los Angeles
- Genres: Experimental rock; avant-pop; proto-prog
- Length: 39:51
- Label: Verve
- Producer: Tom Wilson

Frank Zappa chronology
Freak Out! (1966)	Absolutely Free (1967)	Lumpy Gravy (1967)

The Mothers of Invention chronology
Freak Out! (1966)	Absolutely Free (1967)	We're Only in It for the Money (1968)

Singles from Absolutely Free
- 1. "Son of Suzy Creamcheese" Released: 1967

Absolutely Free is the second album by the American rock band the Mothers of Invention, released on May 26, 1967, by Verve Records. Much like their 1966 debut Freak Out!, the album blends complex musical composition with political and social satire. The album presents two oratorios (with librettos available by mail), blending rock music with jazz, classical, and avant-garde idioms, and is seen as an important and influential precursor to progressive rock and rock operas. The band had been augmented since Freak Out! by the addition of woodwinds player Bunk Gardner, keyboardist Don Preston, rhythm guitarist Jim Fielder, and drummer Billy Mundi; Fielder quit the group before the album was released, and his name was removed from the album credits.

== Background and recording ==
Freak Out! cost Verve $20,000 to make, more than double the cost of a typical album at the time. When it struggled to sell, the record company only allowed a budget of $11,000 for the follow up, which was recorded on four-track over just four days from November 15–18, 1966 at TTG studios in Los Angeles, with additional mixing and editing at MGM in New York City a week later. Tom Wilson again sat in the producer's chair, although it is generally agreed that he took a hands-off approach and let Frank Zappa have full creative control. Unlike Freak Out!, which used extensive orchestration, the budget this time only allowed for orchestral additions to "Brown Shoes Don't Make It", with the band playing virtually live in the studio for most tracks. Since many of the songs were complex multi-sectional pieces, the group would do up to 30 takes of each specific section of a track, which were then strung together in editing. According to Zappa, the group had "one day with 15 minutes per tune to do all the vocals on that album. That's right. It's called 'sing or get off the pot'."

== Songs ==
The album presented two oratorios, with all the songs continually linked, narratively, and musically, which at the time of recording predated the release of the Who's "A Quick One While He's Away" and the Beatles' Sgt. Pepper's Lonely Hearts Club Band. The first suite, entitled "Absolutely Free", is essentially a send-up of a romantic love story with fruits and vegetables acting as a metaphor for people; the second suite, "The M.O.I. American Pageant", is a trenchant social commentary on American life including aspects of social status and mobility, consumerism, alcoholism, greed, and political corruption.

=== "Plastic People" ===
"Plastic People" evolved from the group's cover of "Louie Louie", with new lyrics. It opens with an announcement of the President of the United States, who is ill and needs chicken soup, before going on to critique the "plastic" hippies who hung out at nightclubs like Pandora's Box, the epicenter of the Sunset Strip Riots happening at the time of the album's recording. "Son of Suzy Creamcheese" later in the album goes further into the subject, which presages the themes of the Mothers' next album, We're Only In It For The Money.

=== "The Duke of Prunes" ===
The primary subject of the suite, food, appears on this mock-AOR love ballad with comedic lyrics improvised by Ray Collins, who, as the Duke of Prunes, attempts to pick up a woman at the supermarket by using food references that are meant as euphemisms for sex. The track was based on an original piece called "And Very True", which Zappa had composed for the score of a Western called Run Home, Slow.

=== "Amnesia Vivace" ===
According to the album's libretto, the Duke attempts to pick up two cheerleaders in a parking lot when they bash him in the face with a rock, giving him amnesia. This is portrayed musically as a one minute free jazz freak out which eventually quotes Igor Stravinsky's The Firebird.

=== "The Duke Regains His Chops" ===
The Duke suddenly recovers his memory as a reprise of "Duke of Prunes" appears in a faster tempo before the Duke attempts his final pick-up by singing a Supremes-like tune reminiscent of "Baby Love".

=== "Call Any Vegetable" ===
The food imagery continues in this frantic rock song, although Zappa claimed "vegetables" referred to people who are inactive in society but who might be "woken up" if moved sufficiently and stirred from their apathy.

=== "Invocation and Ritual Dance of the Young Pumpkin" ===
This seven-minute instrumental opens with a quote from Gustav Holst's The Planets before morphing into a wild, proto-jazz fusion group jam in which Zappa displays his improvisational guitar skills for the first time on record.

=== "Soft-Cell Conclusion" ===
A reprise of "Call Any Vegetable", somewhat slower and bluesier with harmonica accompaniment, in which Zappa instructs his listeners how to call to vegetables. The speed then increases to a very fast tempo before ending on a series of sexual pants.

=== "America Drinks" ===
The second suite opens with this send-up of a lounge ballad, sung deliberately off-tempo as if the singer is very drunk, to illustrate the emptiness and falseness of American culture. This is followed by quotes from Fucik's "Entrance of the Gladiators" and the overture to Nikolai Rimsky-Korsakov's The Tsar's Bride, to give a cartoonish circus feel.

=== "Status Back Baby" ===
One of Zappa's doo-wop parodies, although there are oblique insertions of quotes from Stravinsky and Debussy. The lyrical content skewers high school social cliques, as a self-absorbed jock finds he's losing status with the pom-pom girls.

=== "Uncle Bernie's Farm" ===
This relatively straightforward, fast-paced rocker critiques the makers of violent children's toys and compares them to the child's equally plastic parents. It closes with several overlapping voices attempting to sell the listener toy bombs, rockets, intestines, brass knuckles, and other grotesque products.

=== "Son of Suzy Creamcheese" ===
The character of Suzy Creamcheese, a groupie, was first introduced on Freak Out! Here we learn more about her desire to be "in" as she drops acid, stays out all night on Sunset Strip, steals her boyfriend's stash of drugs and attends a protest march in Berkeley. Zappa admitted that the rocker was one of the most difficult songs for The Mothers to learn to play due to its dizzying change of time signatures, moving between 4/4, 8/8, 9/8, 4/8, 5/8, 6/8 and back to 4/4.

=== "Brown Shoes Don't Make It" ===
Described by François Couture of AllMusic as a "condensed two-hour musical", the album's longest song, at over seven minutes, moves through 22 distinct sections covering psychedelia, chamber music, Sprechstimme, garage rock, classical, music hall, doo-wop, the Beach Boys, electronics, and more. It is the only track on the album to feature outside orchestration, which climaxes the piece. There is also a homemade synthesizer played by Don Preston, one of the earliest appearances of such an instrument on a rock record. The song's primary subject is corruption in politics, as a city hall official fantasizes sleeping with a thirteen-year-old girl in graphic detail. The line "I'd like to make her do a nasty on the White House lawn" apparently held up the album's release, as an MGM exec protested its inclusion and wanted to change the line to "I'd like to make her do a crossword puzzle on the back of TV Guide."

=== "America Drinks and Goes Home" ===
A reprise of "America Drinks" set at the "Pompadour-a-Go-Go", this is a similar piano-based lounge ballad Zappa penned in 1964 over which sounds of drinking, gambling, and slot machines get louder until the song fades and only the sounds of drunk partygoers' grotesque laughs and screams remain, meant to illustrate the casual disrespect such audiences have for the performers. There is a stylistic similarity between this number and the later Beatles B-side "You Know My Name (Look Up the Number)" as well as the Rolling Stones' "On with the Show".

== Album cover and libretto ==
The album was planned for release in January 1967 but ran into trouble when Verve objected to Zappa's idea of printing the lyrics on the back cover, as well as to the phrase "war means work for all" on a billboard included in the illustrated collage which had also been constructed by Zappa. Months passed before a compromise was reached: the lyrics would not be printed on the album, but it was allowed for an ad to be placed in the gatefold for listeners to send one dollar [$9.95 in 2026 dollars] for a complete libretto booklet containing lyrics and plot explanations.

Professional ratings
Review scores
Source	Rating
AllMusic	4.5/5 stars
Encyclopedia of Popular Music	5/5 stars
The Great Rock Bible	8/10
Kerrang!	1/5 stars
MusicHound Rock: The Essential Album Guide	4/5 stars
OndaRock	9/10
The Rolling Stone Album Guide	4.5/5 stars
Sputnikmusic	5/5
Uncut	8/10
The Village Voice	B−

== Release and reception ==
The album was released on May 26, 1967. This was the same day as the UK release of Sgt. Pepper's Lonely Hearts Club Band, which also had printed lyrics and no gaps between its songs; had Absolutely Free's release not been significantly delayed by issues over its cover art and lyrics, it would have predated the Beatles in these innovations. The album fared much better overall than Freak Out!, charting at #41 on Billboard and becoming a favorite of the underground.

In a contemporary review, Billboard magazine wondered whether the band were putting their audience on, but concluded that the album would rack up huge sales. Retrospectively, the album has received high praise as an early peak for Zappa's lyrical and compositional innovation, which had evolved considerably since Freak Out!. AllMusic calls it a "fabulously inventive record, bursting at the seams with ideas" while The New Rolling Stone Album Guide awarded four-and-a-half stars. Robert Christgau of The Village Voice was somewhat less charitable, claiming that "as rock and roll it's a moderately amusing novelty record, much too obvious in its satire."

In the book Necessity Is..., former Mothers of Invention band member Ray Collins said that Absolutely Free is probably his favorite of the classic Mothers albums.

== Versions ==
The UK-67 release (Verve VLP/SVLP 9174) came in a laminated flip-back cover, with a Mike Raven poem at the reverse that was not on any other issue.

The CD reissue adds, between sides one and two, two songs that were featured on a rare Verve single of the time. The songs from the single, "Why Dontcha Do Me Right?" (titled "Why Don't You Do Me Right" on the 45) and "Big Leg Emma", were both described as "an attempt to make dumb music to appeal to dumb teenagers".

== Track listing ==
All tracks are written by Frank Zappa.

Side one: "Absolutely Free" (#1 in a Series of Underground Oratorios)
No.	Title	Length
1.	"Plastic People"	3:40
2.	"The Duke of Prunes"	2:12
3.	"Amnesia Vivace"	1:01
4.	"The Duke Regains His Chops"	1:45
5.	"Call Any Vegetable"	2:19
6.	"Invocation & Ritual Dance of the Young Pumpkin" (instrumental)	6:57
7.	"Soft-Sell Conclusion"	1:40
Total length:		20:28

Side two: "The M.O.I. American Pageant" (#2 in a Series of Underground Oratorios)
No.	Title	Length
1.	"America Drinks"	1:52
2.	"Status Back Baby"	2:52
3.	"Uncle Bernie's Farm"	2:09
4.	"Son of Suzy Creamcheese"	1:33
5.	"Brown Shoes Don't Make It"	7:26
6.	"America Drinks & Goes Home"	2:43
Total length:		19:23

2017 Reissue Bonus Record
No.	Title	Length
1.	"Absolutely Free Radio Ad #1"	1:01
2.	"Why Don'tcha Do Me Right?"	2:39
3.	"Big Leg Emma"	2:32
4.	"Absolutely Free Radio Ad #2"	1:01
5.	"Glutton for Punishment..."	0:24
6.	"America Drinks (1969 Re-Mix)"	1:55
7.	"Brown Shoes Don't Make It (1969 Re-Mix)"	7:27
8.	"America Drinks & Go Home (1969 Re-Mix)"	2:42
Total length:		18:41

CD Reissue
No.	Title	Length
1.	"Plastic People"	3:42
2.	"The Duke of Prunes"	2:13
3.	"Amnesia Vivace"	1:01
4.	"The Duke Regains His Chops"	1:52
5.	"Call Any Vegetable"	2:15
6.	"Invocation & Ritual Dance of the Young Pumpkin"	7:00
7.	"Soft-Sell Conclusion"	1:40
8.	"Big Leg Emma"	2:31
9.	"Why Don'tcha Do Me Right?"	2:37
10.	"America Drinks"	1:53
11.	"Status Back Baby"	2:54
12.	"Uncle Bernie's Farm"	2:10
13.	"Son of Suzy Creamcheese"	1:34
14.	"Brown Shoes Don't Make It"	7:30
15.	"America Drinks & Goes Home"	2:45

== Personnel ==
The Mothers of Invention

- Frank Zappa – guitar, conductor, vocals
- Jimmy Carl Black – drums, vocals
- Ray Collins – vocals, tambourine, harmonica
- Roy Estrada – bass, vocals
- Billy Mundi – drums, percussion
- Don Preston – keyboards
- Jim Fielder (Note: Uncredited) – guitar, piano
- Bunk Gardner – woodwinds

Additional musicians

- Suzy Creamcheese (Lisa Cohen) – vocals on "Brown Shoes Don't Make It"
- John Balkin – bass on "Invocation & Ritual Dance of the Young Pumpkin" and "America Drinks"
- Jim Getzoff – violin on "Brown Shoes Don't Make It"
- Marshall Sosson – violin on "Brown Shoes Don't Make It"
- Alvin Dinkin – viola on "Brown Shoes Don't Make It"
- Armand Kaproff – cello on "Brown Shoes Don't Make It"
- Don Ellis – trumpet on "Brown Shoes Don't Make It"
- John Rotella – contrabass clarinet on "Brown Shoes Don't Make It"
- Herb Cohen – cash register machine sounds on "America Drinks & Goes Home"
- Terry Gilliam, girlfriend and others – voices in "America Drinks & Goes Home"

Note

(Jim Sherwood was credited as a member of The Mothers on the album's original release, but he actually joined the band during the recording of We're Only in It for the Money, and he isn't featured on this album.)

Production

- Frank Zappa – producer, arranger, layout design, cover art, collage, liner notes
- Tom Wilson – producer
- Val Valentin – director of engineering
- Ami Hadani – engineer
- David Greene – remixing
- Doug Sax – mastering
- Ferenc Dobronyi – cover design
- Cal Schenkel – cover design
- Alice Ochs – cover photo, artwork
- Jerry Deiter – photography

== Charts ==
Chart (1967)	Peak position
US Billboard 200	41
