= Beat the Boots! 2 =

Beat the Boots! #2

Box set by Frank Zappa
- Released: June 16, 1992
- Recorded: Various locations May 3, 1968–September 8, 1978
- Genre: Rock
- Length: 415:39
- Label: Rhino

Frank Zappa chronology
| Beat the Boots! (1991) | Beat the Boots! #2 (1992) | The MOFO Project/Object (2006) |

Beat the Boots! #2 is a box set by Frank Zappa and a follow-up to the 1991 box set of the same name. Released in 1992 through Rhino Entertainment, the set contains legal reissues of seven bootleg recordings made between 1968 and 1978 and originally distributed illegally prior to this official release. As with the previous box set, no alterations were made to the audio contents or covers of the original bootlegs, reproducing the exact contents and packaging of the bootleg albums.

== Contents ==
The set, packaged in what was designed to look like a low budget cardboard box, also contained a beret, a badge and a memorabilia scrapbook. Electric Aunt Jemima was sourced from three different performances from 1968. Our Man in Nirvana features performances by Don Cherry and Wild Man Fischer. Swiss Cheese/Fire! documents a famous 1971 concert at a casino in Montreux where the venue burned down, inspiring the lyrics of Deep Purple's "Smoke on the Water". Conceptual Continuity is an audience recording. At the Circus is predominantly sourced from a 1978 television broadcast, but two tracks are sourced from a 1970 performance.

== Reception ==
Professional ratings
Review scores
| Source | Rating |
|---|---|
| Allmusic | 4/5 stars |

AllMusic gave the box set a rating of 4 out of 5.

== Track listing ==
All tracks by Frank Zappa, except where noted.

=== Disconnected Synapses ===
Recorded at Palais Gaumont in Paris December 15, 1970.

1. "Penis Dimension" – 11:15
2. "The Air" – 3:54
3. "The Dog Breath/Mother People" – 4:22
4. "You Didn't Try to Call Me" – 3:34
5. "King Kong" – 31:38
6. "Who Are the Brain Police?" – 6:30

=== Tengo Na Minchia Tanta ===
Tengo Na Minchia Tanta (Sicilian for "I've Got a Big Bunch of Dick") was recorded at the Fillmore East in New York City November 14, 1970. Tracks 11–14 are duplicated from the "Freaks & Motherfuckers" disc from box I.

1. "Does This Kind of Life Look Interesting to You?" – 0:49
2. "A Pound for a Brown (On the Bus)" – 7:26
3. "Sleeping in a Jar (with extensions)" – 4:34
4. "Sharleena" – 4:31
5. "The Sanzini Brothers" – 0:32
6. "What Will This Morning Bring Me This Evening?" – 4:35
7. "What Kind of Girl Do You Think We Are?" – 5:00
8. "Bwana Dik" – 1:45
9. "Latex Solar Beef" – 1:00
10. "Daddy, Daddy, Daddy" – 2:46
11. "Little House I Used to Live In" – 4:04
12. "Holiday in Berlin" – 4:36
13. "Inca Roads/Easy Meat" – 7:16
14. "Cruisin' for Burgers" – 2:45

=== Electric Aunt Jemima ===
Electric Aunt Jemima incorporates material from various dates: tracks 1, 2, 5 and 7 are from a show at The Dog in Denver, Colorado, May 3, 1968; tracks 3 and 6 are from Concertgebouw in Amsterdam October 20, 1968; and track 4 was recorded at Grugahalle in Essen, Germany, September 28, 1968.

1. "Little House I Used to Live In/Dog Breath Variations/Blue Danube Waltz/Hungry Freaks, Daddy" – 14:30
2. "w̃hät" – 3:53 ("Khaki Sack")
3. "Dog Breath" – 2:10
4. "King Kong" – 16:30
5. "More Trouble Every Day" – 5:59
6. "A Pound for a Brown (On the Bus)" – 8:36
7. "English Tea Dancing Interludes/Plastic People/King Kong/America Drinks/Wipe Out" – 12:00 [the first ingredient in this medley is Zappa's arrangement of a motif from Edgard Varèse's "Octandre"]

=== At the Circus ===
All tracks were recorded at Circus Krone in Munich on September 8, 1978, except tracks 6 and 7, recorded for VPRO TV, Uddel, Netherlands June 18, 1970.

1. "A Pound for a Brown (On the Bus)" – 2:15
2. "Baby Snakes" – 2:05
3. "Dancin' Fool" – 3:15
4. "Easy Meat" – 4:39
5. "Honey, Don't You Want a Man Like Me?" – 4:32
6. "Mother People" – 2:40
7. "Wonderful Wino" – 5:41
8. "Why Does It Hurt When I Pee?" – 2:21
9. "Seal Call Fusion Music" – 3:12
10. "Bobby Brown Goes Down" – 2:53
11. "I'm On Duty" – 1:52
12. "Conehead" – 5:31

=== Swiss Cheese/Fire! ===
Swiss Cheese and Fire! were initially produced as two separate bootlegs by the same bootleggers. Both were recorded at the same show at Casino in Montreux in Switzerland on December 4, 1971, that inspired Deep Purple's song "Smoke on the Water". Swiss Cheese comprises tracks 1 to 5 and Fire! tracks 6 to 11.

Disc one: Swiss Cheese

1. "Zanti Serenade" – 14:21
2. "Peaches En Regalia" – 3:27
3. "Tears Began to Fall/She Painted Up Her Face/Half-a-Dozen Provocative Squats" – 5:59
4. "Call Any Vegetable" – 9:55
5. "Any Way the Wind Blows" – 3:44

Disc Two: Fire!

1. "Magdalena/Dog Breath" – 9:49
2. "Sofa" – 18:06
3. "A Pound for a Brown (On the Bus)" – 7:07
4. "Wonderful Wino/Sharleena/Cruisin' for Burgers" – 12:37
5. "King Kong" – 1:24
6. "Fire!" – 1:55

=== Our Man in Nirvana ===
Recorded at Titan Gymnasium, California State College, Fullerton, California, on March 15, 1969, with Larry “Wild Man” Fischer performing guest vocals on tracks 5 and 6. Although Frank Zappa’s official website lists California State University, Fullerton, and November 8, 1968, contemporary reports in The Titan dated March 14 and 18, 1969, together with Charles Ulrich’s corrections to The Big Note, support the March 15, 1969 date, while an original pre-concert handbill identifies the venue as Titan Gymnasium.

1. "Feet Light Up" – 1:16
2. "Bacon Fat" (Andre Williams) – 4:58
3. "A Pound for a Brown (On the Bus)" – 8:26
4. "Sleeping in a Jar" – 17:16
5. "The Wild Man Fischer Story" (Larry Fischer) – 3:28
6. "I'm the Meany" (Fischer) – 2:02
7. "Valarie" (Clarence Lewis, Bobby Robinson) – 2:17
8. "King Kong" – 30:59

=== Conceptual Continuity ===
Recorded at Cobo Hall in Detroit November 19, 1976.

1. "Stink-Foot/Dirty Love/Wind Up Workin' in a Gas Station" – 17:58
2. "The Torture Never Stops/City of Tiny Lites" – 21:09
