= Beat the Boots! =

Box set by Frank Zappa
- Released: July 7, 1991
- Recorded: Various locations September 30, 1967 – May 21, 1982
- Genre: Rock; jazz-funk
- Length: 420:05
- Label: Rhino

Frank Zappa chronology
The Old Masters (1987)	Beat the Boots! (1991)	Beat the Boots! #2 (1992)

Beat the Boots! is a box set by Frank Zappa. Released in 1991 through Rhino Entertainment, the set contains legal reissues of eight bootleg recordings made between 1967 and 1982 and originally distributed illegally prior to this official release. A second box set of bootleg recordings, Beat the Boots! II, was released through Rhino in June 1992.

== Contents ==
Beat the Boots! was released so that Zappa could reclaim financial and legal ownership of the recordings. By reproducing the contents and artwork of bootleg albums, Zappa could claim any further reproduction of the recordings as a counterfeit, which would make further unauthorized distribution of his music easier to prosecute. The box set was released in limited vinyl record and cassette tape runs, and the titles were also released as individual compact discs by Rhino Entertainment.

Tis the Season to Be Jelly is a recording of a radio broadcast. The Ark had been produced from a soundboard recording that had been stolen from Zappa's studio. The same tapes also produced the bootleg Twenty Years Ago...Again, distributed by bootlegger Evil Records, which contains a significantly longer version of the song "My Guitar Wants to Kill Your Mama", which is three minutes shorter on The Ark. Piquantique contains audio from a TV broadcast highlighting a jazz-funk incarnation of Zappa's band. Unmitigated Audacity is an audience recording. As An Am contains an excerpt from a radio interview in which Zappa criticized bootleggers and bootleg recordings.

== Reception ==
Professional ratings
Review scores
Source	Rating
Allmusic	4/5 stars

AllMusic gave the box set a rating of 4 out of 5.

== Track listing ==
All tracks by Frank Zappa, except where noted.

=== As an Am ===
Recordings are from three separate shows. Track 1 is from May 19, 1981, at Rockline, KLOS-FM, Los Angeles; tracks 2 and 3 are from May 21, 1982, at Sporthalle in Cologne, Germany, and tracks 4–6 are from October 31, 1981, at the Palladium in New York City.

1. "That Makes Me Mad" – 0:51
2. "Young & Monde" ("Let's Move To Cleveland") – 11:24
3. "Sharleena" – 9:09
4. "Black Napkins" – 3:58
5. "Black Page #2" – 7:12
6. "The Torture Never Stops" – 11:03

=== The Ark ===
Recorded at The Ark in Boston on July 8, 1969 (mislabeled as 1968).

1. "Intro" – 0:56
2. "Big Leg Emma" – 3:42
3. "Some Ballet Music" – 7:16
4. "Status Back Baby" – 5:48
5. "Valarie" (Clarence Lewis, Bobby Robinson) – 3:30
6. "My Guitar" – 6:46
7. "Uncle Meat/King Kong (Medley)" – 23:49

=== Freaks & Motherfu*#@%! ===
Recorded at Fillmore East in New York City on November 14, 1970. The original bootleg version was called Freaks and Motherfuckers.

1. "Happy Together" (Gary Bonner, Alan Gordon) – 1:25
2. "Wonderful Wino-with Dr. John Routine" (Zappa, Jeff Simmons) – 7:44
3. "Concentration Moon" – 1:18
4. "Pallidan Routine" – 1:14
5. "Call Any Vegetable" – 8:56
6. "Little House I Used to Live In" – 4:26
7. "Mudshark Variations" – 1:10
8. "Holiday in Berlin" – 3:33
9. "Sleeping in a Jar" – 7:23
10. "Cruisin' for Burgers" – 2:52

=== Unmitigated Audacity ===
Recorded at University of Notre Dame on May 12, 1974.

1. "Dupree's Paradise/It Can't Happen Here" – 3:12
2. "Hungry Freaks, Daddy" – 2:46
3. "You're Probably Wondering Why I'm Here" – 2:44
4. "How Could I Be Such a Fool?" – 3:42
5. "I Ain't Got No Heart" – 2:20
6. "I'm Not Satisfied" – 2:18
7. "Wowie Zowie" – 3:18
8. "Let's Make the Water Turn Black" – 2:23
9. "Harry, You're a Beast" – 0:53
10. "Oh No" – 8:14
11. "More Trouble Every Day" – 7:53
12. "Louie Louie" – 1:55
13. "Camarillo Brillo" – 5:07

=== Anyway the Wind Blows ===
Recorded at Nouvel Hippodrome in Paris on February 24, 1979.

==== Disc one ====
1. "Watermelon in Easter Hay" – 4:27
2. "Dead Girls of London" – 2:38
3. "I Ain't Got No Heart" – 2:11
4. "Brown Shoes Don't Make It" – 7:29
5. "Cosmik Debris" – 4:11
6. "Tryin' to Grow a Chin" – 3:34
7. "City of Tiny Lites" – 9:25
8. "Dancin' Fool" – 3:31
9. "Easy Meat" – 6:40

==== Disc two ====
1. "Jumbo Go Away" – 3:44
2. "Andy" – 5:21
3. "Inca Roads" – 5:42
4. "Florentine Pogen" – 5:26
5. "Honey, Don't You Want a Man Like Me?" – 4:33
6. "Keep It Greasey" – 3:31
7. "The Meek Shall Inherit Nothing" – 3:24
8. "Another Cheap Aroma" – 2:38 (Correct title: "For the Young Sophisticate")
9. "Wet T-Shirt Night" – 2:29
10. "Why Does It Hurt When I Pee?" – 2:38
11. "Peaches en Regalia" – 3:40

=== 'Tis the Season to Be Jelly ===
Recorded at Konserthuset in Stockholm on September 30, 1967.

1. "You Didn't Try to Call Me" – 3:12
2. "Petroushka" (Igor Stravinsky) – 0:52 (for copyright reasons not on the European CD version)
3. "Bristol Stomp" (Kal Mann, Dave Appell) – 0:45
4. "Baby Love" – 0:47
5. "Big Leg Emma" – 2:09
6. "No Matter What You Do (Tchaikovsky's 6th)" – 2:41
7. "Blue Suede Shoes" (Carl Perkins) – 0:53
8. "Hound Dog" (Jerry Leiber, Mike Stoller) – 0:14
9. "Gee" (William Davis, Viola Watkins) – 1:52
10. "King Kong" – 14:18
11. "It Can't Happen Here" – 9:18

=== Saarbrücken 1978 ===
Recorded at Ludwigsparkstadion in Saarbrücken, Germany, on September 3, 1978.

1. "Dancin' Fool" – 3:42
2. "Easy Meat" – 5:05
3. "Honey, Don't You Want a Man Like Me?" – 4:15
4. "Keep It Greasey" – 3:31
5. "Village of the Sun" – 6:20
6. "The Meek Shall Inherit Nothing" – 3:45
7. "City of Tiny Lites" – 6:43
8. "Pound for a Brown" – 6:36
9. "Bobby Brown Goes Down" – 2:56
10. "Conehead" – 3:33
11. "Flakes" – 5:01
12. "Magic Fingers" – 2:30
13. "Don't Eat the Yellow Snow" – 3:52
14. "Nanook Rubs It" – 1:47
15. "St. Alfonzo's Pancake Breakfast" – 6:42
  - comprising:
    - "Father O'Blivion"
    - "Rollo"
16. "Bamboozled by Love" – 6:45

=== Piquantique ===
Recorded at Solliden in Skansen, Sweden, on August 21, 1973, with the exception of track 4, which is taken from a concert at the Roxy, December 1973.

1. "Kung Fu" – 2:12 (includes the opening theme from "The Eric Dolphy Memorial Barbecue")
2. "RDNZL" – 4:26
3. "Dupree's Paradise" – 11:25
4. "T'Mershi Duween" – 1:55
5. "Father O'Blivion" – 20:41 (including themes from the "Steno Pool" section of "The Adventures of Greggery Peccary", "The Be-Bop Tango" and a fast instrumental arrangement of "Cucamonga".)
