= Brown Shoes Don't Make It =

Song by The Mothers of Invention

from the album Absolutely Free
- Released: May 26, 1967
- Recorded: November 18, 1966
- Studio: TTG Studios, Los Angeles
- Genre: Progressive rock; experimental rock; comedy rock
- Length: 7:30
- Label: Verve
- Songwriter: Frank Zappa
- Producers: Frank Zappa, Tom Wilson

"Brown Shoes Don't Make It" is a song by The Mothers of Invention, written by band leader Frank Zappa. It is the penultimate song on the second album Absolutely Free. The song is one of his most widely renowned works, described by AllMusic as "Zappa's first real masterpiece".

== History ==
The title was inspired by an event covered by Time magazine reporter Hugh Sidey in 1966. The reporter correctly guessed that something was amiss when the fastidiously dressed President Lyndon B. Johnson made the sartorial faux pas of wearing brown shoes with a gray suit. Johnson flew to Vietnam for a surprise public relations visit later that day.

Live versions of this song are featured on the albums Tinsel Town Rebellion and Road Tapes, Venue 2.

== Music and lyrics ==
The song was written in April 1966 during a trip to Honolulu, where The Mothers played for a week at a club called "Da Swamp". It starts as a general attack on suburban American society: TV, greed and conformity are all mocked openly. The story then moves to a city hall official fantasizing about having sex with a thirteen-year-old girl.

The music makes several stylistic shifts, covering blues rock, modernist classical music, psychedelic rock, vaudeville, and jazz. It is cited by AllMusic as being a "condensed two-hour musical". Zappa said the opening music section was inspired by Lightnin' Slim's "Have Your Way".

== Reception ==
In a positive review of the album, Dominique Chevalier said "there are snatches of dodecaphonic scales, ballads, rock, R&B, Beach Boys, soap opera and more... and ensures that this is no piece of easy listening". As well as giving its parent album 4.5 stars, AllMusic gave a very positive review of the song. It is also included in The Rock and Roll Hall of Fame's 500 Songs that Shaped Rock and Roll.

== Personnel ==
- Ray Collins – vocals, tambourine
- Frank Zappa – electric guitar, vocals
- Jim Fielder – electric guitar, piano
- Don Preston – keyboards
- Roy Estrada – bass guitar, vocals
- Jimmy Carl Black – drums, vocals
- Billy Mundi – drums, percussion
- Bunk Gardner – woodwinds

with:

- Suzy Creamcheese (Lisa Cohen) – vocals
- Jim Getzoff – violin
- Marshall Sosson – violin
- Alvin Dinkin – viola
- Armand Kaproff – cello
- Don Ellis – trumpet
- John Rotella – contrabass clarinet
