= Thee Image Club =

Coordinates: 25.8532°N 80.1206°W

Thee Image was a short-lived music venue located at 18330 Collins Avenue in Miami Beach, Florida. Owned and operated by Marshall Brevetz, the club opened on March 15, 1968. The site of the venue had been previously occupied by a 32 lane bowling alley known as the Sunny Isles Bowling Center. The club consisted of a big open ballroom floor with three stages, a meditation room, and black lights. Tampa-based Blues Image were chosen to be the house band for the club. Several famous rock bands and musicians performed at the club in the late 1960s, including The Mothers of Invention, The Lovin' Spoonful, Cream, The Grateful Dead, NRBQ, Led Zeppelin, Fantasy, The Jeff Beck Group, Canned Heat, and Steppenwolf. The Doors were set to play at Thee Image, but promoters at the venue instead decided they would perform at the Dinner Key Auditorium, partly due to the limited space in the club. Led Zeppelin played two shows on February 14th and 15th, 1969. Tiny Tim also performed there at the height of his popularity. The building was only in operation as a music club for a few years before being closed and demolished. The site is now occupied by a Publix.
